= Brabham Grand Prix results =

Formula One constructor results

The table below details the complete World Championship Grand Prix results of the Formula One constructor Brabham between 1962 and 1992. It includes results from the works team as well as privately entered cars. Since the Constructors' Championship points were awarded to chassis-engine combinations rather than entrants, the table is sorted first by engine manufacturer then by entrant.

== Complete Formula One World Championship results ==
(key)

Year	Entrant	Chassis	Engine	Tyres	Driver	1	2	3	4	5	6	7	8	9	10	11	12	13	14	15	16	17	Constructor	Points	WCC
1962	Brabham Racing Organisation	Lotus 24	Climax FWMV 1.5 V8	D		NED	MON	BEL	FRA	GBR	GER	ITA	USA	RSA									Lotus-Climax	—N/a (Note: Entrant only)	
1962	Brabham Racing Organisation	Lotus 24	Climax FWMV 1.5 V8	D	(Australia) Jack Brabham	Ret	8	4	Ret	5													Lotus-Climax	—N/a	
1962	Brabham Racing Organisation	BT3	Climax FWMV 1.5 V8	D	(Australia) Jack Brabham						Ret		4	4									Brabham-Climax	6	7th
1963	Brabham Racing Organisation	Lotus 25	Climax FWMV 1.5 V8	D		MON	BEL	NED	FRA	GBR	GER	ITA	USA	MEX	RSA								Lotus-Climax	—N/a	
1963	Brabham Racing Organisation	Lotus 25	Climax FWMV 1.5 V8	D	(Australia) Jack Brabham	9																	Lotus-Climax	—N/a	
1963	Brabham Racing Organisation	BT3; BT7	Climax FWMV 1.5 V8	D	(Australia) Jack Brabham	PO (Note: Jack Brabham only used the Brabham BT3 in practice. He drove a spare works Lotus 25 for the rest of the weekend after the engine in his Brabham BT3 failed.)	Ret	Ret	4	Ret	7	5	4	2	13								Brabham-Climax	28 (30)	3rd
1963	Brabham Racing Organisation	BT3; BT7	Climax FWMV 1.5 V8	D	(United States) Dan Gurney	Ret	3	2	5	Ret	Ret	14	Ret	6	2^{F}								Brabham-Climax	28 (30)	3rd
1963	David Prophet	BT6	Ford 109E 1.5 L4	D	(United Kingdom) David Prophet										Ret								Brabham-Ford	0	NC
1964	Brabham Racing Organisation	BT7; BT11	Climax FWMV 1.5 V8	D		MON	NED	BEL	FRA	GBR	GER	AUT	ITA	USA	MEX								Brabham-Climax	30	4th
1964	Brabham Racing Organisation	BT7; BT11	Climax FWMV 1.5 V8	D	(Australia) Jack Brabham	Ret	Ret	3	3^{F}	4	12	9	14	Ret	Ret								Brabham-Climax	30	4th
1964	Brabham Racing Organisation	BT7; BT11	Climax FWMV 1.5 V8	D	(United States) Dan Gurney	Ret	Ret^{P}	6^{P}^{F}	1	13	10	Ret^{F}	10	Ret	1								Brabham-Climax	30	4th
1964	DW Racing Enterprises	BT11	Climax FWMV 1.5 V8	D	(United Kingdom) Bob Anderson	7	6	DNS	12	7	Ret	3	11										Brabham-Climax	30	4th
1964	R.R.C. Walker Racing Team	BT7	Climax FWMV 1.5 V8	D	(Sweden) Jo Bonnier							6	12	Ret	Ret								Brabham-Climax	30	4th
1964	Siffert Racing Team	BT11	BRM P56 1.5 V8	D	(Switzerland) Jo Siffert		13	Ret	Ret	11	4	Ret	7										Brabham-BRM	7	6th
1964	R.R.C. Walker Racing Team	BT11	BRM P56 1.5 V8	D	(Sweden) Jo Bonnier		9	Ret		Ret	Ret												Brabham-BRM	7	6th
1964	R.R.C. Walker Racing Team	BT11	BRM P56 1.5 V8	D	(Austria) Jochen Rindt							Ret											Brabham-BRM	7	6th
1964	R.R.C. Walker Racing Team	BT11	BRM P56 1.5 V8	D	(Italy) Geki								DNQ										Brabham-BRM	7	6th
1964	R.R.C. Walker Racing Team	BT11	BRM P56 1.5 V8	D	(Switzerland) Jo Siffert									3	Ret								Brabham-BRM	7	6th
1964	R.R.C. Walker Racing Team	BT11	BRM P56 1.5 V8	D	(United States) Hap Sharp									NC	13								Brabham-BRM	7	6th
1964	Ian Raby Racing	BT3	BRM P56 1.5 V8	D	(United Kingdom) Ian Raby					Ret			DNQ										Brabham-BRM	7	6th
1964	John Willment Automobiles	BT10	Ford 109E 1.5 L4	D	(Australia) Frank Gardner					Ret													Brabham-Ford	0	NC
1965	Brabham Racing Organisation	BT7; BT11	Climax FWMV 1.5 V8	G		RSA	MON	BEL	FRA	GBR	NED	GER	ITA	USA	MEX								Brabham-Climax	27 (31)	3rd
1965	Brabham Racing Organisation	BT7; BT11	Climax FWMV 1.5 V8	G	(Australia) Jack Brabham	8	Ret	4		DNS		5		3	Ret								Brabham-Climax	27 (31)	3rd
1965	Brabham Racing Organisation	BT7; BT11	Climax FWMV 1.5 V8	G	(United States) Dan Gurney	Ret		10	Ret	6	3	3	3	2	2^{F}								Brabham-Climax	27 (31)	3rd
1965	Brabham Racing Organisation	BT7; BT11	Climax FWMV 1.5 V8	G	(New Zealand) Denny Hulme		8		4	Ret	5	Ret	Ret										Brabham-Climax	27 (31)	3rd
1965	Brabham Racing Organisation	BT7; BT11	Climax FWMV 1.5 V8	G	(Italy) Giancarlo Baghetti								Ret										Brabham-Climax	27 (31)	3rd
1965	R.R.C. Walker Racing Team	BT7	Climax FWMV 1.5 V8	D	(Sweden) Jo Bonnier	Ret	7	Ret	Ret	7	Ret	7	7	8	Ret								Brabham-Climax	27 (31)	3rd
1965	DW Racing Enterprises	BT11	Climax FWMV 1.5 V8	D	(United Kingdom) Bob Anderson	NC	9	DNS	9	Ret	Ret	DNS											Brabham-Climax	27 (31)	3rd
1965	R.R.C. Walker Racing Team	BT11	BRM P56 1.5 V8	D	(Switzerland) Jo Siffert	7	6	8	6	9	13	Ret	Ret	11	4								Brabham-BRM	5	7th
1965	John Willment Automobiles	BT11	BRM P56 1.5 V8	D	(Australia) Frank Gardner	12	Ret	Ret		8	11	Ret	Ret										Brabham-BRM	5	7th
1965	Ian Raby Racing	BT3	BRM P56 1.5 V8	D	(United Kingdom) Ian Raby					11		DNQ											Brabham-BRM	5	7th
1965	Ian Raby Racing	BT3	BRM P56 1.5 V8	D	(New Zealand) Chris Amon					DNS													Brabham-BRM	5	7th
1965	John Willment Automobiles	BT10	Ford 109E 1.5 L4	D	(Australia) Paul Hawkins	9																	Brabham-Ford	0	NC
1965	David Prophet	BT10	Ford 109E 1.5 L4	D	(United Kingdom) David Prophet	14																	Brabham-Ford	0	NC
1966	Brabham Racing Organisation	BT19; BT20	Repco 620 3.0 V8	G		MON	BEL	FRA	GBR	NED	GER	ITA	USA	MEX									Brabham-Repco	42 (49)	1st
1966	Brabham Racing Organisation	BT19; BT20	Repco 620 3.0 V8	G	(Australia) Jack Brabham	Ret	4	1	1^{P}^{F}	1^{P}	1	Ret	Ret^{P}	2									Brabham-Repco	42 (49)	1st
1966	Brabham Racing Organisation	BT19; BT20	Repco 620 3.0 V8	G	(New Zealand) Denny Hulme			3	2	Ret^{F}	Ret	3	Ret	3									Brabham-Repco	42 (49)	1st
1966	DW Racing Enterprises	BT11	Climax FPF 2.8 L4	F	(United Kingdom) Bob Anderson	Ret		7	NC	Ret	Ret	6											Brabham-Climax	1	10th
1966	Brabham Racing Organisation	BT22	Climax FPF 2.8 L4	G	(New Zealand) Denny Hulme	Ret	Ret																Brabham-Climax	1	10th
1966	Brabham Racing Organisation	BT22	Climax FPF 2.8 L4	G	(United Kingdom) Chris Irwin				7														Brabham-Climax	1	10th
1966	Anglo-Suisse Racing Team	BT22	Climax FPF 2.8 L4	F	(Sweden) Jo Bonnier			NC															Brabham-Climax	1	10th
1966	Anglo-Suisse Racing Team	BT7	Climax FWMV 1.5 V8	F	(Sweden) Jo Bonnier				Ret														Brabham-Climax	1	10th
1966	R.R.C. Walker Racing Team	BT11	BRM P60 2.0 V8	D	(Switzerland) Jo Siffert	Ret																	Brabham-BRM	1	11th
1966	David Bridges	BT11	BRM P60 2.0 V8	G	(United Kingdom) John Taylor			6	8	8	Ret												Brabham-BRM	1	11th
1966	Chris Amon Racing	BT11	BRM P60 1.9 V8	D	(New Zealand) Chris Amon							DNQ											Brabham-BRM	1	11th
1966	Roy Winkelmann Racing	BT18	Ford Cosworth SCA 1.0 L4	D	(Germany) Hans Herrmann						11												Brabham-Ford	—N/a (Note: Formula Two entry)	
1966	Roy Winkelmann Racing	BT18	Ford Cosworth SCA 1.0 L4	D	(United Kingdom) Alan Rees						Ret												Brabham-Ford	—N/a	
1966	Caltex Racing Team	BT18	Ford Cosworth SCA 1.0 L4	D	(Germany) Kurt Ahrens Jr.						Ret												Brabham-Ford	—N/a	
1966	Silvio Moser	BT16	Ford Cosworth SCA 1.0 L4	D	(Switzerland) Silvio Moser						DNS												Brabham-Ford	—N/a	
1967	Brabham Racing Organisation	BT20; BT19; BT24	Repco 740 3.0 V8	G		RSA	MON	NED	BEL	FRA	GBR	GER	CAN	ITA	USA	MEX							Brabham-Repco	63 (67)	1st
1967	Brabham Racing Organisation	BT20; BT19; BT24	Repco 740 3.0 V8	G	(Australia) Jack Brabham	6^{P}	Ret^{P}	2	Ret	1	4	2	1	2	5	2							Brabham-Repco	63 (67)	1st
1967	Brabham Racing Organisation	BT20; BT19; BT24	Repco 740 3.0 V8	G	(New Zealand) Denny Hulme	4^{F}	1	3	Ret	2	2^{F}	1	2	Ret	3	3							Brabham-Repco	63 (67)	1st
1967	Guy Ligier	BT20	Repco 620 3.0 V8	F	(France) Guy Ligier						10	8 (Note: Guy Ligier finished 8th in the 1967 German Grand Prix, but was awarded the point for 6th place as the two F2 drivers who finished ahead of him were ineligible to score points.)		Ret	Ret	11							Brabham-Repco	63 (67)	1st
1967	DW Racing Enterprises	BT11	Climax FPF 2.8 L4	F	(United Kingdom) Bob Anderson	5	DNQ	9	8		Ret												Brabham-Climax	2	11th
1967	DW Racing Enterprises	BT11	Climax FPF 2.8 L4	D	(United Kingdom) Bob Anderson					Ret													Brabham-Climax	2	11th
1967	Scuderia Scribante	BT11	Climax FPF 2.8 L4	F	(South Africa) Dave Charlton	NC																	Brabham-Climax	2	11th
1967	Luki Botha	BT11	Climax FPF 2.8 L4	F	(South Africa) Luki Botha	NC																	Brabham-Climax	2	11th
1967	Roy Winkelmann Racing	BT23	Ford Cosworth FVA 1.6 L4	D	(United Kingdom) Alan Rees							7											Brabham-Ford	—N/a	
1967	Gerhard Mitter	BT23	Ford Cosworth FVA 1.6 L4	D	(Germany) Gerhard Mitter							Ret											Brabham-Ford	—N/a	
1968	Brabham Racing Organisation	BT24; BT26	Repco 740 3.0 V8; Repco 860 3.0 V8	G		RSA	ESP	MON	BEL	NED	FRA	GBR	GER	ITA	CAN	USA	MEX						Brabham-Repco	10	8th
1968	Brabham Racing Organisation	BT24; BT26	Repco 740 3.0 V8; Repco 860 3.0 V8	G	(Australia) Jack Brabham	Ret	DNS	Ret	Ret	Ret	Ret	Ret	5	Ret	Ret	Ret	10						Brabham-Repco	10	8th
1968	Brabham Racing Organisation	BT24; BT26	Repco 740 3.0 V8; Repco 860 3.0 V8	G	(Austria) Jochen Rindt	3	Ret	Ret	Ret	Ret	Ret^{P}	Ret	3	Ret	Ret^{P}	Ret	Ret						Brabham-Repco	10	8th
1968	Brabham Racing Organisation	BT24; BT26	Repco 740 3.0 V8; Repco 860 3.0 V8	G	(United States) Dan Gurney					Ret													Brabham-Repco	10	8th
1968	Team Gunston	BT20	Repco 620 3.0 V8	F	(Rhodesia) John Love	9																	Brabham-Repco	10	8th
1968	Scuderia Scribante	BT11	Repco 620 3.0 V8	F	(South Africa) Dave Charlton	Ret																	Brabham-Repco	10	8th
1968	Charles Vögele Racing	BT20	Repco 620 3.0 V8	G	(Switzerland) Silvio Moser			DNQ		5		NC	DNS	DNQ									Brabham-Repco	10	8th
1968	Caltex Racing Team	BT24	Repco 740 3.0 V8	D	(Germany) Kurt Ahrens Jr.								12										Brabham-Repco	10	8th
1968	Team Pretoria	BT11	Climax FPF 2.8 L4	F	(South Africa) Jackie Pretorius	NC																	Brabham-Climax	0	NC
1969	Motor Racing Developments Ltd	BT26A	Ford Cosworth DFV 3.0 V8	G		RSA	ESP	MON	NED	FRA	GBR	GER	ITA	CAN	USA	MEX							Brabham-Ford	49 (51)	2nd
1969	Motor Racing Developments Ltd	BT26A	Ford Cosworth DFV 3.0 V8	G	(Australia) Jack Brabham	Ret^{P}	Ret	Ret	6				Ret	2^{F}	4	3^{P}							Brabham-Ford	49 (51)	2nd
1969	Motor Racing Developments Ltd	BT26A	Ford Cosworth DFV 3.0 V8	G	(Belgium) Jacky Ickx	Ret	6	Ret	5	3	2	1^{P}^{F}	10	1^{P}^{F}	Ret	2^{F}							Brabham-Ford	49 (51)	2nd
1969	Frank Williams Racing Cars	BT26A	Ford Cosworth DFV 3.0 V8	D	(United Kingdom) Piers Courage		Ret	2	Ret	Ret	5	Ret	5	Ret	2	10							Brabham-Ford	49 (51)	2nd
1969	Silvio Moser Racing Team	BT24	Ford Cosworth DFV 3.0 V8	G	(Switzerland) Silvio Moser			Ret	Ret	7			Ret	Ret	6	11							Brabham-Ford	49 (51)	2nd
1969	Frank Williams Racing Cars	BT30	Ford Cosworth FVA 1.6 L4	D	(United Kingdom) Richard Attwood							6											Brabham-Ford	49 (51)	2nd
1969	Ahrens Racing Team	BT30	Ford Cosworth FVA 1.6 L4	D	(Germany) Kurt Ahrens Jr.							7											Brabham-Ford	49 (51)	2nd
1969	Felday Engineering Ltd	BT30	Ford Cosworth FVA 1.6 L4	F	(United Kingdom) Peter Westbury							9											Brabham-Ford	49 (51)	2nd
1969	Squadra Tartaruga	BT23C	Ford Cosworth FVA 1.6 L4	F	(Switzerland) Xavier Perrot							10											Brabham-Ford	49 (51)	2nd
1969	Team Gunston	BT24	Repco 620 3.0 V8	F	(Rhodesia) Sam Tingle	8																	Brabham-Repco	0	NC
1969	Jack Holme	BT20	Repco 620 3.0 V8	G	(South Africa) Peter de Klerk	NC																	Brabham-Repco	0	NC
1969	Paul Seitz	BT23B	Climax FPF 2.8 L4	D	(Canada) John Cordts									Ret									Brabham-Climax	0	NC
1970	Motor Racing Developments Ltd; Auto Motor Und Sport	BT33	Ford Cosworth DFV 3.0 V8	G		RSA	ESP	MON	BEL	NED	FRA	GBR	GER	AUT	ITA	CAN	USA	MEX					Brabham-Ford	35	4th
1970	Motor Racing Developments Ltd; Auto Motor Und Sport	BT33	Ford Cosworth DFV 3.0 V8	G	(Australia) Jack Brabham	1^{F}	Ret^{P}^{F}	2	Ret	11	3^{F}	2^{F}	Ret	13	Ret	Ret	10	Ret					Brabham-Ford	35	4th
1970	Motor Racing Developments Ltd; Auto Motor Und Sport	BT33	Ford Cosworth DFV 3.0 V8	G	(Germany) Rolf Stommelen	Ret	Ret	DNQ	5	DNQ	7	DNS	5	3	5	Ret	12	Ret					Brabham-Ford	35	4th
1970	Team Gunston	BT26A	Ford Cosworth DFV 3.0 V8	G	(South Africa) Peter de Klerk	11																	Brabham-Ford	35	4th
1970	Tom Wheatcroft Racing	BT26A	Ford Cosworth DFV 3.0 V8	G	(United Kingdom) Derek Bell				Ret														Brabham-Ford	35	4th
1970	Gus Hutchison	BT26A	Ford Cosworth DFV 3.0 V8	G	(United States) Gus Hutchison												Ret						Brabham-Ford	35	4th
1971	Motor Racing Developments Ltd	BT33; BT34	Ford Cosworth DFV 3.0 V8	G		RSA	ESP	MON	NED	FRA	GBR	GER	AUT	ITA	CAN	USA							Brabham-Ford	5	9th
1971	Motor Racing Developments Ltd	BT33; BT34	Ford Cosworth DFV 3.0 V8	G	(United Kingdom) Graham Hill	9	Ret	Ret	10	Ret	Ret	9	5	Ret	Ret	7							Brabham-Ford	5	9th
1971	Motor Racing Developments Ltd	BT33; BT34	Ford Cosworth DFV 3.0 V8	G	(Australia) Tim Schenken		9	10	Ret	12	12	6	3	Ret	Ret	Ret							Brabham-Ford	5	9th
1971	Scribante Lucky Strike Racing	BT33	Ford Cosworth DFV 3.0 V8	G	(South Africa) Dave Charlton	Ret																	Brabham-Ford	5	9th
1971	Team Gunston	BT26A	Ford Cosworth DFV 3.0 V8	G	(South Africa) Jackie Pretorius	Ret																	Brabham-Ford	5	9th
1971	Ecurie Evergreen	BT33	Ford Cosworth DFV 3.0 V8	G	(United Kingdom) Chris Craft										DNQ	Ret							Brabham-Ford	5	9th
1972	Motor Racing Developments	BT33; BT34; BT37	Ford Cosworth DFV 3.0 V8	G		ARG	RSA	ESP	MON	BEL	FRA	GBR	GER	AUT	ITA	CAN	USA						Brabham-Ford	7	9th
1972	Motor Racing Developments	BT33; BT34; BT37	Ford Cosworth DFV 3.0 V8	G	(United Kingdom) Graham Hill	Ret	6	10	12	Ret	10	Ret	6	Ret	5	8	11						Brabham-Ford	7	9th
1972	Motor Racing Developments	BT33; BT34; BT37	Ford Cosworth DFV 3.0 V8	G	(Argentina) Carlos Reutemann	7^{P}	Ret			13	12	8	Ret	Ret	Ret	4	Ret						Brabham-Ford	7	9th
1972	Motor Racing Developments	BT33; BT34; BT37	Ford Cosworth DFV 3.0 V8	G	(Brazil) Wilson Fittipaldi			7	9	Ret	8	12	7	Ret	Ret	Ret	Ret						Brabham-Ford	7	9th
1972	Team Gunston	BT33	Ford Cosworth DFV 3.0 V8	F	(South Africa) Willie Ferguson		DNS																Brabham-Ford	7	9th
1973	Motor Racing Developments; Ceramica Pagnossin Team MRD	BT37; BT42	Ford Cosworth DFV 3.0 V8	G		ARG	BRA	RSA	ESP	BEL	MON	SWE	FRA	GBR	NED	GER	AUT	ITA	CAN	USA			Brabham-Ford	22	4th
1973	Motor Racing Developments; Ceramica Pagnossin Team MRD	BT37; BT42	Ford Cosworth DFV 3.0 V8	G	(Argentina) Carlos Reutemann	Ret	11	7	Ret	Ret	Ret	4	3	6	Ret	Ret	4	6	8	3			Brabham-Ford	22	4th
1973	Motor Racing Developments; Ceramica Pagnossin Team MRD	BT37; BT42	Ford Cosworth DFV 3.0 V8	G	(Brazil) Wilson Fittipaldi	6	Ret	Ret	10	Ret	11	Ret	16	Ret	Ret	5	Ret	Ret	11	NC			Brabham-Ford	22	4th
1973	Motor Racing Developments; Ceramica Pagnossin Team MRD	BT37; BT42	Ford Cosworth DFV 3.0 V8	G	(Italy) Andrea de Adamich				Ret	4	7		Ret	Ret									Brabham-Ford	22	4th
1973	Motor Racing Developments; Ceramica Pagnossin Team MRD	BT37; BT42	Ford Cosworth DFV 3.0 V8	G	(United Kingdom) John Watson									Ret						Ret			Brabham-Ford	22	4th
1973	Motor Racing Developments; Ceramica Pagnossin Team MRD	BT37; BT42	Ford Cosworth DFV 3.0 V8	G	(Germany) Rolf Stommelen											11	Ret	12	12				Brabham-Ford	22	4th
1974	Motor Racing Developments	BT42; BT44	Ford Cosworth DFV 3.0 V8	G		ARG	BRA	RSA	ESP	BEL	MON	SWE	NED	FRA	GBR	GER	AUT	ITA	CAN	USA			Brabham-Ford	35	5th
1974	Motor Racing Developments	BT42; BT44	Ford Cosworth DFV 3.0 V8	G	(Argentina) Carlos Reutemann	7	7	1^{F}	Ret	Ret	Ret	Ret	12	Ret	6	3	1	Ret	9	1^{P}			Brabham-Ford	35	5th
1974	Motor Racing Developments	BT42; BT44	Ford Cosworth DFV 3.0 V8	G	(United Kingdom) Richard Robarts	Ret	15	17															Brabham-Ford	35	5th
1974	Motor Racing Developments	BT42; BT44	Ford Cosworth DFV 3.0 V8	G	(Liechtenstein) Rikky von Opel				Ret	Ret	DNQ	9	9	DNQ									Brabham-Ford	35	5th
1974	Motor Racing Developments	BT42; BT44	Ford Cosworth DFV 3.0 V8	G	(Brazil) Carlos Pace										9	12	Ret	5^{F}	8	2^{F}			Brabham-Ford	35	5th
1974	Motor Racing Developments	BT42; BT44	Ford Cosworth DFV 3.0 V8	G	(Belgium) Teddy Pilette					17													Brabham-Ford	35	5th
1974	John Goldie Racing with Hexagon	BT42; BT44	Ford Cosworth DFV 3.0 V8	F	(United Kingdom) John Watson	12	Ret	Ret	11	11	6	11	7	16	11	Ret	4	7	Ret	5			Brabham-Ford	35	5th
1974	John Goldie Racing with Hexagon	BT42; BT44	Ford Cosworth DFV 3.0 V8	F	(Brazil) Carlos Pace									DNQ									Brabham-Ford	35	5th
1974	Scuderia Finotto	BT42	Ford Cosworth DFV 3.0 V8	F	(France) Gérard Larrousse					Ret				DNQ									Brabham-Ford	35	5th
1974	Scuderia Finotto	BT42	Ford Cosworth DFV 3.0 V8	F	(Austria) Helmut Koinigg												DNQ						Brabham-Ford	35	5th
1974	Scuderia Finotto	BT42	Ford Cosworth DFV 3.0 V8	F	(Italy) Carlo Facetti													DNQ					Brabham-Ford	35	5th
1974	Allied Polymer Group	BT42	Ford Cosworth DFV 3.0 V8	G	(Italy) Lella Lombardi										DNQ								Brabham-Ford	35	5th
1974	The Chequered Flag	BT42	Ford Cosworth DFV 3.0 V8	G	(United Kingdom) Ian Ashley														DNQ	DNQ			Brabham-Ford	35	5th
1974	Team Canada F1 Racing	BT42	Ford Cosworth DFV 3.0 V8	G	(Canada) Eppie Wietzes														Ret				Brabham-Ford	35	5th
1975	Martini Racing	BT44B	Ford Cosworth DFV 3.0 V8	G		ARG	BRA	RSA	ESP	MON	BEL	SWE	NED	FRA	GBR	GER	AUT	ITA	USA				Brabham-Ford	54 (56)	2nd
1975	Martini Racing	BT44B	Ford Cosworth DFV 3.0 V8	G	(Argentina) Carlos Reutemann	3	8	2	3	9	3	2	4	14	Ret	1	14	4	Ret				Brabham-Ford	54 (56)	2nd
1975	Martini Racing	BT44B	Ford Cosworth DFV 3.0 V8	G	(Brazil) Carlos Pace	Ret	1	4^{P}^{F}	Ret	3	8	Ret	5	Ret	2	Ret	Ret	Ret	Ret				Brabham-Ford	54 (56)	2nd
1976	Martini Racing	BT45	Alfa Romeo 115-12 3.0 F12	G		BRA	RSA	USW	ESP	BEL	MON	SWE	FRA	GBR	GER	AUT	NED	ITA	CAN	USA	JPN		Brabham-Alfa Romeo	9	9th
1976	Martini Racing	BT45	Alfa Romeo 115-12 3.0 F12	G	(Brazil) Carlos Pace	10	Ret	9	6	Ret	9	8	4	8	4	Ret	Ret	Ret	7	Ret	Ret		Brabham-Alfa Romeo	9	9th
1976	Martini Racing	BT45	Alfa Romeo 115-12 3.0 F12	G	(Argentina) Carlos Reutemann	12	Ret	Ret	4	Ret	Ret	Ret	11	Ret	Ret	Ret	Ret						Brabham-Alfa Romeo	9	9th
1976	Martini Racing	BT45	Alfa Romeo 115-12 3.0 F12	G	(Germany) Rolf Stommelen										6			Ret					Brabham-Alfa Romeo	9	9th
1976	Martini Racing	BT45	Alfa Romeo 115-12 3.0 F12	G	(Australia) Larry Perkins														17	Ret	Ret		Brabham-Alfa Romeo	9	9th
1976	RAM Racing	BT44B	Ford Cosworth DFV 3.0 V8	G	(Switzerland) Loris Kessel				DNQ	12		Ret	DNQ			NC							Brabham-Ford	0	NC
1976	RAM Racing	BT44B	Ford Cosworth DFV 3.0 V8	G	(Spain) Emilio de Villota				DNQ														Brabham-Ford	0	NC
1976	RAM Racing	BT44B	Ford Cosworth DFV 3.0 V8	G	(Belgium) Patrick Nève					Ret													Brabham-Ford	0	NC
1976	RAM Racing	BT44B	Ford Cosworth DFV 3.0 V8	G	(Denmark) Jac Nellemann							DNQ											Brabham-Ford	0	NC
1976	RAM Racing	BT44B	Ford Cosworth DFV 3.0 V8	G	(United Kingdom) Damien Magee								DNQ										Brabham-Ford	0	NC
1976	RAM Racing	BT44B	Ford Cosworth DFV 3.0 V8	G	(United Kingdom) Bob Evans									Ret									Brabham-Ford	0	NC
1976	RAM Racing	BT44B	Ford Cosworth DFV 3.0 V8	G	(Italy) Lella Lombardi									DNQ	DNQ	12							Brabham-Ford	0	NC
1976	RAM Racing	BT44B	Ford Cosworth DFV 3.0 V8	G	(Germany) Rolf Stommelen										DNS								Brabham-Ford	0	NC
1977	Martini Racing	BT45; BT45B	Alfa Romeo 115-12 3.0 F12	G		ARG	BRA	RSA	USW	ESP	MON	BEL	SWE	FRA	GBR	GER	AUT	NED	ITA	USA	CAN	JPN	Brabham-Alfa Romeo	27	5th
1977	Martini Racing	BT45; BT45B	Alfa Romeo 115-12 3.0 F12	G	(United Kingdom) John Watson	Ret	Ret	6^{F}	DSQ	Ret	Ret^{P}	Ret	5	2	Ret	Ret	8^{F}	Ret	Ret	12	Ret	Ret	Brabham-Alfa Romeo	27	5th
1977	Martini Racing	BT45; BT45B	Alfa Romeo 115-12 3.0 F12	G	(Brazil) Carlos Pace	2	Ret	13															Brabham-Alfa Romeo	27	5th
1977	Martini Racing	BT45; BT45B	Alfa Romeo 115-12 3.0 F12	G	(Germany) Hans-Joachim Stuck				Ret	6	Ret	6	10	Ret	5	3	3	7	Ret	Ret	Ret	7	Brabham-Alfa Romeo	27	5th
1977	Martini Racing	BT45; BT45B	Alfa Romeo 115-12 3.0 F12	G	(Italy) Giorgio Francia														DNQ				Brabham-Alfa Romeo	27	5th
1978	Parmalat Racing Team	BT45C; BT46; BT46B; BT46C	Alfa Romeo 115-12 3.0 F12	G		ARG	BRA	RSA	USW	MON	BEL	ESP	SWE	FRA	GBR	GER	AUT	NED	ITA	USA	CAN		Brabham-Alfa Romeo	53	3rd
1978	Parmalat Racing Team	BT45C; BT46; BT46B; BT46C	Alfa Romeo 115-12 3.0 F12	G	(Austria) Niki Lauda	2	3	Ret^{P}	Ret	2^{F}	Ret	Ret	1^{F}	Ret	2^{F}	Ret	Ret	3^{F}	1	Ret	Ret		Brabham-Alfa Romeo	53	3rd
1978	Parmalat Racing Team	BT45C; BT46; BT46B; BT46C	Alfa Romeo 115-12 3.0 F12	G	(United Kingdom) John Watson	Ret	8	3	Ret	4	Ret	5	Ret	4^{P}	3	7	7	4	2	Ret	Ret		Brabham-Alfa Romeo	53	3rd
1978	Parmalat Racing Team	BT45C; BT46; BT46B; BT46C	Alfa Romeo 115-12 3.0 F12	G	(Brazil) Nelson Piquet																11		Brabham-Alfa Romeo	53	3rd
1979	Parmalat Racing Team	BT46; BT48	Alfa Romeo 115-12 3.0 F12; Alfa Romeo 1260 3.0 V12	G		ARG	BRA	RSA	USW	ESP	BEL	MON	FRA	GBR	GER	AUT	NED	ITA	CAN	USA			Brabham-Alfa Romeo	7	8th
1979	Parmalat Racing Team	BT46; BT48	Alfa Romeo 115-12 3.0 F12; Alfa Romeo 1260 3.0 V12	G	(Austria) Niki Lauda	Ret	Ret	6	Ret	Ret	Ret	Ret	Ret	Ret	Ret	Ret	Ret	4					Brabham-Alfa Romeo	7	8th
1979	Parmalat Racing Team	BT46; BT48	Alfa Romeo 115-12 3.0 F12; Alfa Romeo 1260 3.0 V12	G	(Brazil) Nelson Piquet	Ret	Ret	7	8	Ret	Ret	Ret	Ret	Ret	12	Ret	4	Ret					Brabham-Alfa Romeo	7	8th
1979	Parmalat Racing Team	BT49	Ford Cosworth DFV 3.0 V8	G	(Argentina) Ricardo Zunino														7	Ret			Brabham-Ford	0	NC
1979	Parmalat Racing Team	BT49	Ford Cosworth DFV 3.0 V8	G	(Brazil) Nelson Piquet														Ret	Ret^{F}			Brabham-Ford	0	NC
1980	Parmalat Racing Team	BT49	Ford Cosworth DFV 3.0 V8	G		ARG	BRA	RSA	USW	BEL	MON	FRA	GBR	GER	AUT	NED	ITA	CAN	USA				Brabham-Ford	55	3rd
1980	Parmalat Racing Team	BT49	Ford Cosworth DFV 3.0 V8	G	(Brazil) Nelson Piquet	2	Ret	4	1^{P}^{F}	Ret	3	4	2	4	5	1	1	Ret^{P}	Ret				Brabham-Ford	55	3rd
1980	Parmalat Racing Team	BT49	Ford Cosworth DFV 3.0 V8	G	(Argentina) Ricardo Zunino	7	8	10	Ret	Ret	DNQ	Ret											Brabham-Ford	55	3rd
1980	Parmalat Racing Team	BT49	Ford Cosworth DFV 3.0 V8	G	(Mexico) Héctor Rebaque								7	Ret	10	Ret	Ret	6	Ret				Brabham-Ford	55	3rd
1981	Parmalat Racing Team	BT49C	Ford Cosworth DFV 3.0 V8	MI; G		USW	BRA	ARG	SMR	BEL	MON	ESP	FRA	GBR	GER	AUT	NED	ITA	CAN	CPL			Brabham-Ford	61	2nd
1981	Parmalat Racing Team	BT49C	Ford Cosworth DFV 3.0 V8	MI; G	(Brazil) Nelson Piquet	3	12^{P}	1^{P}^{F}	1	Ret	Ret^{P}	Ret	3	Ret	1	3	2	6	5^{P}	5			Brabham-Ford	61	2nd
1981	Parmalat Racing Team	BT49C	Ford Cosworth DFV 3.0 V8	MI; G	(Mexico) Héctor Rebaque	Ret	Ret	Ret	4	Ret	DNQ	Ret	9	5	4	Ret	4	Ret	Ret	Ret			Brabham-Ford	61	2nd
1982	Parmalat Racing Team	BT50	BMW M12/13 1.5 L4t	G		RSA	BRA	USW	SMR	BEL	MON	DET	CAN	NED	GBR	FRA	GER	AUT	SUI	ITA	CPL		Brabham-BMW	22	7th
1982	Parmalat Racing Team	BT50	BMW M12/13 1.5 L4t	G	(Brazil) Nelson Piquet	Ret				5	Ret	DNQ	1	2	Ret	Ret	Ret^{F}	Ret^{P}^{F}	4	Ret	Ret		Brabham-BMW	22	7th
1982	Parmalat Racing Team	BT50	BMW M12/13 1.5 L4t	G	(Italy) Riccardo Patrese	Ret				Ret				15	Ret	Ret^{F}	Ret	Ret	5	Ret	Ret		Brabham-BMW	22	7th
1982	Parmalat Racing Team	BT49C; BT49D	Ford Cosworth DFV 3.0 V8	G	(Brazil) Nelson Piquet		DSQ	Ret															Brabham-Ford	19	9th
1982	Parmalat Racing Team	BT49C; BT49D	Ford Cosworth DFV 3.0 V8	G	(Italy) Riccardo Patrese		Ret	3			1^{F}	Ret	2										Brabham-Ford	19	9th
1983	Fila Sport	BT52; BT52B	BMW M12/13 1.5 L4t	MI		BRA	USW	FRA	SMR	MON	BEL	DET	CAN	GBR	GER	AUT	NED	ITA	EUR	RSA			Brabham-BMW	72	3rd
1983	Fila Sport	BT52; BT52B	BMW M12/13 1.5 L4t	MI	(Brazil) Nelson Piquet	1^{F}	Ret	2	Ret	2^{F}	4	4	Ret	2	13	3	Ret^{P}	1^{F}	1	3^{F}			Brabham-BMW	72	3rd
1983	Fila Sport	BT52; BT52B	BMW M12/13 1.5 L4t	MI	(Italy) Riccardo Patrese	Ret	10	Ret	Ret^{F}	Ret	Ret	Ret	Ret	Ret	3	Ret	9	Ret^{P}	7	1			Brabham-BMW	72	3rd
1984	MRD International	BT53	BMW M12/13 1.5 L4t	MI		BRA	RSA	BEL	SMR	FRA	MON	CAN	DET	DAL	GBR	GER	AUT	NED	ITA	EUR	POR		Brabham-BMW	38	4th
1984	MRD International	BT53	BMW M12/13 1.5 L4t	MI	(Brazil) Nelson Piquet	Ret	Ret^{P}	9	Ret^{P}^{F}	Ret	Ret	1^{P}^{F}	1^{P}	Ret	7^{P}	Ret	2^{P}	Ret	Ret^{P}	3^{P}^{F}	6^{P}		Brabham-BMW	38	4th
1984	MRD International	BT53	BMW M12/13 1.5 L4t	MI	(Italy) Teo Fabi	Ret	Ret	Ret	Ret	9			3		Ret	Ret	4	5	Ret	Ret			Brabham-BMW	38	4th
1984	MRD International	BT53	BMW M12/13 1.5 L4t	MI	(Italy) Corrado Fabi						Ret	Ret		7									Brabham-BMW	38	4th
1984	MRD International	BT53	BMW M12/13 1.5 L4t	MI	(Germany) Manfred Winkelhock																10		Brabham-BMW	38	4th
1985	Motor Racing Developments	BT54	BMW M12/13 1.5 L4t	P		BRA	POR	SMR	MON	CAN	DET	FRA	GBR	GER	AUT	NED	ITA	BEL	EUR	RSA	AUS		Brabham-BMW	26	5th
1985	Motor Racing Developments	BT54	BMW M12/13 1.5 L4t	P	(Brazil) Nelson Piquet	Ret	Ret	8	Ret	Ret	6	1	4	Ret	Ret	8^{P}	2	5	Ret	Ret	Ret		Brabham-BMW	26	5th
1985	Motor Racing Developments	BT54	BMW M12/13 1.5 L4t	P	(France) François Hesnault	Ret	Ret	Ret	DNQ														Brabham-BMW	26	5th
1985	Motor Racing Developments	BT54	BMW M12/13 1.5 L4t	P	(Switzerland) Marc Surer					15	8	8	6	Ret	6	10	4	8	Ret	Ret	Ret		Brabham-BMW	26	5th
1986	Motor Racing Developments	BT55; BT54	BMW M12/13/1 1.5 L4t	P		BRA	ESP	SMR	MON	BEL	CAN	DET	FRA	GBR	GER	HUN	AUT	ITA	POR	MEX	AUS		Brabham-BMW	2	9th
1986	Motor Racing Developments	BT55; BT54	BMW M12/13/1 1.5 L4t	P	(Italy) Riccardo Patrese	Ret	Ret	6	Ret	8	Ret	6	7	Ret	Ret	Ret	Ret	Ret	Ret	13	Ret		Brabham-BMW	2	9th
1986	Motor Racing Developments	BT55; BT54	BMW M12/13/1 1.5 L4t	P	(Italy) Elio de Angelis	8	Ret	Ret	Ret														Brabham-BMW	2	9th
1986	Motor Racing Developments	BT55; BT54	BMW M12/13/1 1.5 L4t	P	(United Kingdom) Derek Warwick						Ret	10	9	8	7	Ret	DNS	Ret	Ret	Ret	Ret		Brabham-BMW	2	9th
1987	Motor Racing Developments	BT56	BMW M12/13 1.5 L4t	G		BRA	SMR	BEL	MON	DET	FRA	GBR	GER	HUN	AUT	ITA	POR	ESP	MEX	JPN	AUS		Brabham-BMW	10	8th
1987	Motor Racing Developments	BT56	BMW M12/13 1.5 L4t	G	(Italy) Riccardo Patrese	Ret	9	Ret	Ret	9	Ret	Ret	Ret	5	Ret	Ret	Ret	13	3	11			Brabham-BMW	10	8th
1987	Motor Racing Developments	BT56	BMW M12/13 1.5 L4t	G	(Italy) Stefano Modena																Ret		Brabham-BMW	10	8th
1987	Motor Racing Developments	BT56	BMW M12/13 1.5 L4t	G	(Italy) Andrea de Cesaris	Ret	Ret	3	Ret	Ret	Ret	Ret	Ret	Ret	Ret	Ret	Ret	Ret	Ret	Ret	8		Brabham-BMW	10	8th
1989	Motor Racing Developments	BT58	Judd EV 3.5 V8	P		BRA	SMR	MON	MEX	USA	CAN	FRA	GBR	GER	HUN	BEL	ITA	POR	ESP	JPN	AUS		Brabham-Judd	8	8th
1989	Motor Racing Developments	BT58	Judd EV 3.5 V8	P	(United Kingdom) Martin Brundle	Ret	Ret	6	9	Ret	DNPQ	DNPQ	Ret	8	12	Ret	6	8	Ret	5	Ret		Brabham-Judd	8	8th
1989	Motor Racing Developments	BT58	Judd EV 3.5 V8	P	(Italy) Stefano Modena	Ret	Ret	3	10	Ret	Ret	Ret	Ret	Ret	11	Ret	EX	14	Ret	Ret	8		Brabham-Judd	8	8th
1990	Motor Racing Developments	BT58; BT59	Judd EV 3.5 V8	P		USA	BRA	SMR	MON	CAN	MEX	FRA	GBR	GER	HUN	BEL	ITA	POR	ESP	JPN	AUS		Brabham-Judd	2	9th
1990	Motor Racing Developments	BT58; BT59	Judd EV 3.5 V8	P	(Switzerland) Gregor Foitek	Ret	Ret																Brabham-Judd	2	9th
1990	Motor Racing Developments	BT58; BT59	Judd EV 3.5 V8	P	(Australia) David Brabham			DNQ	Ret	DNQ	Ret	15	DNQ	Ret	DNQ	Ret	DNQ	Ret	DNQ	Ret	Ret		Brabham-Judd	2	9th
1990	Motor Racing Developments	BT58; BT59	Judd EV 3.5 V8	P	(Italy) Stefano Modena	5	Ret	Ret	Ret	7	11	13	9	Ret	Ret	17	Ret	Ret	Ret	Ret	12		Brabham-Judd	2	9th
1991	Motor Racing Developments	BT59Y; BT60Y	Yamaha OX99 3.5 V12	P		USA	BRA	SMR	MON	CAN	MEX	FRA	GBR	GER	HUN	BEL	ITA	POR	ESP	JPN	AUS		Brabham-Yamaha	3	9th
1991	Motor Racing Developments	BT59Y; BT60Y	Yamaha OX99 3.5 V12	P	(United Kingdom) Martin Brundle	11	12	11	EX	Ret	Ret	Ret	Ret	11	Ret	9	13	12	10	5	DNQ		Brabham-Yamaha	3	9th
1991	Motor Racing Developments	BT59Y; BT60Y	Yamaha OX99 3.5 V12	P	(United Kingdom) Mark Blundell	Ret	Ret	8	Ret	DNQ	Ret	Ret	Ret	12	Ret	6	12	Ret	Ret	DNPQ	17		Brabham-Yamaha	3	9th
1992	Motor Racing Developments	BT60B	Judd GV 3.5 V10	G		RSA	MEX	BRA	ESP	SMR	MON	CAN	FRA	GBR	GER	HUN	BEL	ITA	POR	JPN	AUS		Brabham-Judd	0	NC
1992	Motor Racing Developments	BT60B	Judd GV 3.5 V10	G	(Belgium) Eric van de Poele	13	DNQ	DNQ	DNQ	DNQ	DNQ	DNQ	DNQ	DNQ	DNQ								Brabham-Judd	0	NC
1992	Motor Racing Developments	BT60B	Judd GV 3.5 V10	G	(Italy) Giovanna Amati	DNQ	DNQ	DNQ															Brabham-Judd	0	NC
1992	Motor Racing Developments	BT60B	Judd GV 3.5 V10	G	(United Kingdom) Damon Hill				DNQ	DNQ	DNQ	DNQ	DNQ	16	DNQ	11							Brabham-Judd	0	NC
