= 1984 United States Grand Prix =

1984 United States Grand Prix may refer to:

- 1984 Dallas Grand Prix
- 1984 Detroit Grand Prix
