= Brabham BT53 =

Formula One race car

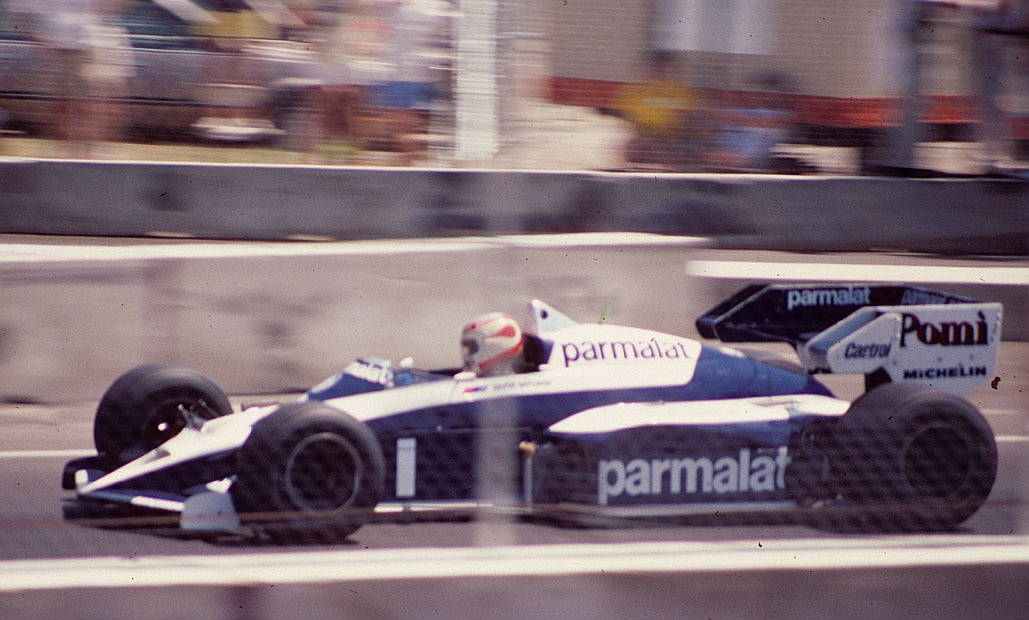
- Nelson Piquet driving a BT53 at the 1984 Dallas Grand Prix
- Category: Formula One
- Constructor: Brabham
- Designers: Gordon Murray (Technical Director); David North (Chief Designer); Paul Rosche (Chief Engine Designer (BMW))
- Predecessor: Brabham BT52B
- Successor: Brabham BT54

Technical specifications
- Chassis: Aluminium and carbon fibre monocoque
- Suspension (front): Double wishbones, push-rod operated coil springs over dampers
- Suspension (rear): Double wishbones, push-rod operated coil springs over dampers
- Axle track: Front: 1,702 mm (67.0 in); Rear: 1,626 mm (64.0 in)
- Wheelbase: 2,946 mm (116.0 in)
- Engine: BMW M12/13, 1,499 cc (91.5 cu in), Straight 4, turbo, mid-engine, longitudinally mounted
- Transmission: Brabham / Hewland 5-speed manual
- Weight: 545 kg (1,201.5 lb)
- Fuel: Castrol
- Tyres: Michelin

Competition history
- Notable entrants: MRD International
- Notable drivers: 1. (Brazil) Nelson Piquet; 2. (Italy) Teo Fabi; 2. (Italy) Corrado Fabi; 2. (West Germany) Manfred Winkelhock
- Debut: 1984 Brazilian Grand Prix
Races	Wins	Poles	F/Laps
16	2	9	3
- Constructors' Championships: 0
- Drivers' Championships: 0

The Brabham BT53 was a Formula One car designed by Gordon Murray for the Brabham team for the 1984 Formula One season and was a development of the BT52 which had carried the team's lead driver Nelson Piquet to the 1983 championship.

== Design ==
The car was almost identical to the final development version of the 1983 car, the BT52B, but featured larger sidepods for improved cooling, and the turbochargers and intercoolers were repositioned for better fuel efficiency as refuelling stops were now banned, leading to the car having to carry an enlarged (220 litre) fuel tank. The turbocharged BMW M12 engine now produced around 900 bhp (671 kW; 912 PS) in qualifying trim, de-tuned to 800 bhp (597 kW; 811 PS) for the races, making it the most powerful car ever seen in F1 at the time. This power allowed Piquet to record the fastest speed trap of the 1984 season when he clocked 325 km/h (202 mph) on the one km long straight at the old Kyalami circuit during qualifying for Round 2 of the championship in South Africa.

Like all other cars in Formula One in 1984, the rear wings featured smaller winglets on each side of the end plates for extra downforce pioneered by Ferrari in 1983.

== Drivers ==
The car was driven by reigning world champion Piquet who was joined at Brabham by the Fabi brothers Teo and Corrado in a shared drive allowing older brother Teo to honor commitments in the North American–based Champ Car World Series for Forsythe Racing (Teo Fabi had started racing Champ Car for Forsythe in 1983 and sat on the pole for the 1983 Indianapolis 500, being only the second rookie in 500 history to do so). Corrado replaced Teo three times in 1984, the first being Monaco when Teo was racing in Milwaukee. The other two were in North America as Teo missed both the Canadian and Dallas Grands Prix while racing at Portland and Cleveland respectively. Teo Fabi also missed the season ending Portuguese Grand Prix when he was racing the Champ Car race at Laguna Seca. Fabi was replaced in Portugal by Manfred Winkelhock who had raced the first 13 races of the season for the ATS team.

The reason Brabham ended up with the Fabi brothers sharing the drive was reportedly due to the team's major sponsor, Italian dairy company Parmalat, wanting to maintain an Italian driver alongside Piquet as Riccardo Patrese had left the team for Alfa Romeo. Team boss Bernie Ecclestone settled on Teo Fabi as the best Italian available, but due to his commitments in Champ Car, the arrangement was made to employ the brothers (Corrado had driven for Osella in 1983). It was rumoured that, on Piquet's suggestion, young Brazilian driver Roberto Moreno was to be Piquet's team mate before Parmalat stepped in with their demands while John Watson also confirmed that he had been close to signing with the team after being dumped by McLaren who had signed Alain Prost.

== Season summary ==
Although Piquet won twice (in Canada and Detroit), and scored several podium places in the second half of the season, the straight-4cyl BMW engine, or more specifically the turbochargers rather than the engine itself, were now becoming unreliable. The team suffered turbo failures repeatedly in both qualifying and races despite efforts by Gordon Murray and BMW engineers to improve the car and engine, and Piquet did not score his first points of the season until his win in Round 7 in Canada. The John Barnard designed McLaren MP4/2 with its Porsche built TAG V6 turbo was dominant, with drivers Niki Lauda (the 1984 World Champion), and Alain Prost (2nd to Lauda by only ½ a point), winning 12 of the season's 16 races between them, and saw to it that Piquet could not retain his championship. He scored another win at the grueling Detroit Grand Prix a week after his Canadian triumph, but Piquet would not win again that year.

Reliability was found in the second half of the season, which allowed Piquet to eventually finish fifth in the title hunt. The saddest aspect was that the BT53 was, in Piquet and Teo Fabi's hands, regularly faster than the McLarens, as Piquet's nine pole positions throughout the season attested (Prost was the only McLaren driver to qualify on pole during 1984, doing so three times). The car was very quick in qualifying on light fuel loads, but its race pace was negatively affected particularly on full fuel loads. More reliability from the BMW turbo might have given Piquet a realistic chance of defending his championship. Indeed, in the first seven races before scoring his win in Canada, Piquet retired with engine, electrical (as in Monaco) or turbo failure. Often early in the season when he retired, Piquet had either leading the race or was in a position to challenge for the lead.

The BT53 was replaced by the BT54 for 1985.

== Complete Formula One results ==
(key) (Races in bold indicate pole position; races in italics indicate fastest lap)

Year	Entrant	Engine	Tyres	Drivers	1	2	3	4	5	6	7	8	9	10	11	12	13	14	15	16	Points	WCC
1984	MRD International	BMW M12/13; S4 tc	**M**		BRA	RSA	BEL	SMR	FRA	MON	CAN	DET	DAL	GBR	GER	AUT	NED	ITA	EUR	POR	38	4th
1984	MRD International	BMW M12/13; S4 tc	**M**	Nelson Piquet	Ret	**Ret**	9	**Ret**	Ret	Ret	**1**	**1**	Ret	**7**	Ret	**2**	Ret	**Ret**	**3**	**6**	38	4th
1984	MRD International	BMW M12/13; S4 tc	**M**	Teo Fabi	Ret	Ret	Ret	Ret	9			3		Ret	Ret	4	5	Ret	Ret		38	4th
1984	MRD International	BMW M12/13; S4 tc	**M**	Corrado Fabi						Ret	Ret		7								38	4th
1984	MRD International	BMW M12/13; S4 tc	**M**	Manfred Winkelhock																10	38	4th
