= BMW M12 =

4-cylinder turbocharged Formula One engine, based on the standard BMW M10

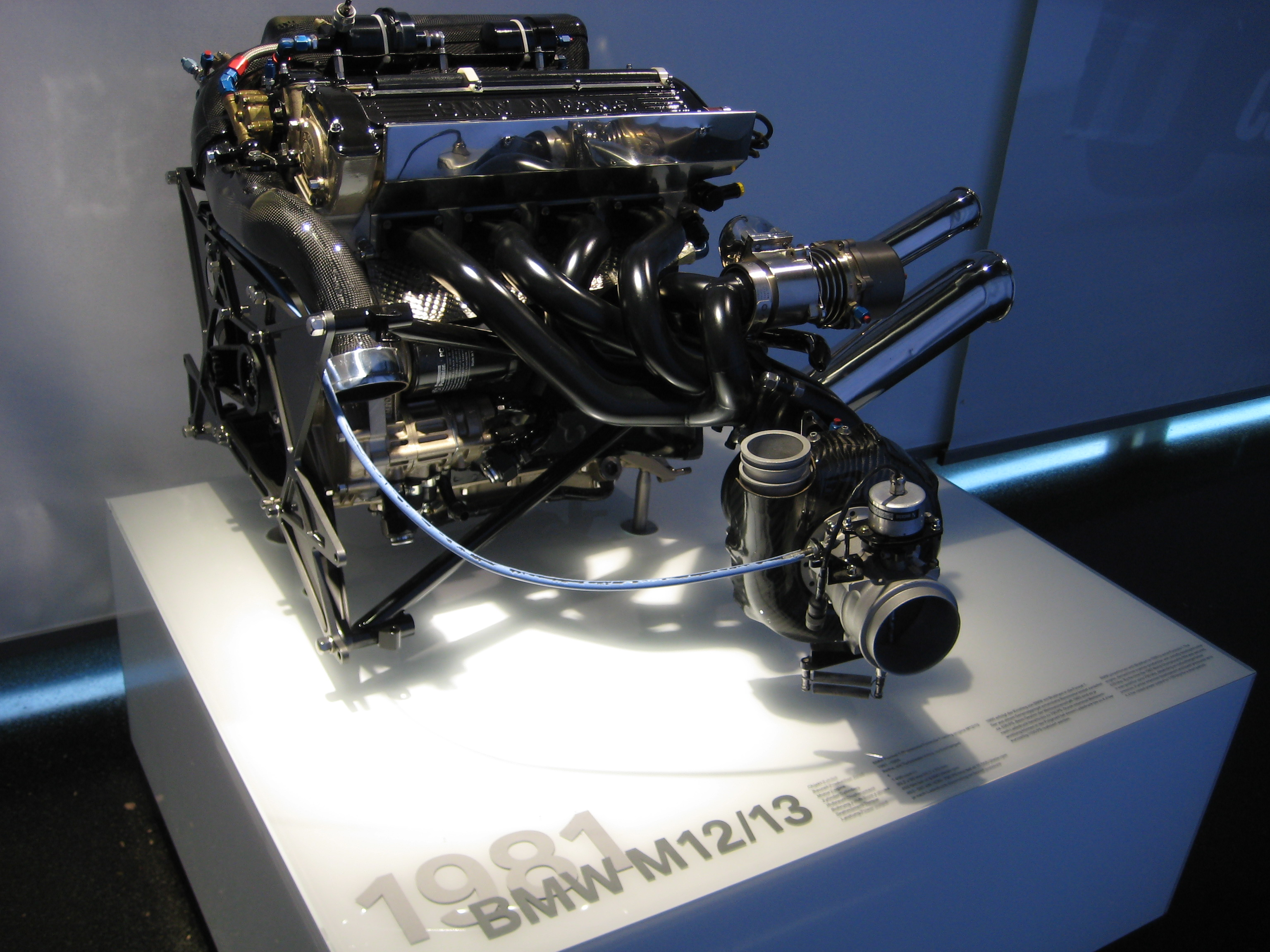
- BMW M12/13 engine

Overview
- Manufacturer: BMW
- Production: 1982–1987

Layout
- Configuration: 180° I-4
- Displacement: 1.5 L (1,499.8 cc)
- Cylinder bore: 89.2 mm (3.5 in)
- Piston stroke: 60 mm (2.4 in)
- Compression ratio: 7.5:1

Combustion
- Turbocharger: KKK
- Fuel system: Electronic fuel injection
- Fuel type: Gasoline
- Cooling system: Water-cooled

Output
- Power output: 300–1,400 PS (221–1,030 kW; 296–1,381 bhp)
- Torque output: 237–1,532 N⋅m (175–1,130 lb⋅ft)

Dimensions
- Dry weight: 45–70 kg (99.2–154.3 lb)

Chronology
- Successor: BMW E41 / P80 engine

The BMW M12/13 turbo was a 1,499.8 cc four-cylinder turbocharged Formula One engine, based on the standard BMW M10 engine introduced in 1961, and powered the F1 cars of Brabham, Arrows and Benetton. Nelson Piquet won the FIA Formula One Drivers' Championship in 1983 driving a Brabham powered by the BMW M12/13 turbo. It was the first Drivers' Championship to be won using a turbocharged engine. The engine also powered the BMW GTP and in the 2.0-litre naturally-aspirated form, the successful March Engineering Formula Two cars. BMW engineers estimated the engine produced around 1,400 hp at maximum boost, however the BMW engine dynamometer could not go beyond 1,280 bhp.

== History ==
=== Formula 2 ===
As BMW M12/7, this engine design became one of the most successful in racing since being presented in the late 1960s. Starting with the European Touring Car Championship, it was also used in Formula 2, expanded to two-litre and fitted with four-valve heads, producing over 300 PS (221 kW). In the Deutsche Rennsport Meisterschaft, a 1,400 cc variant (with a 1.4 handicap factor making it about equal to 2,000 cc) was turbocharged by Paul Rosche according to FIA Group 5 rules. At well over 350 PS (257 kW) from the beginning, it rendered the normally-aspirated engines in the two-litre category useless. After some development, power, driveability, and reliability improved, especially in the IMSA car, and BMW began to think about entering F1, where a handicap factor of 2.0 required 1,500 cc engines.

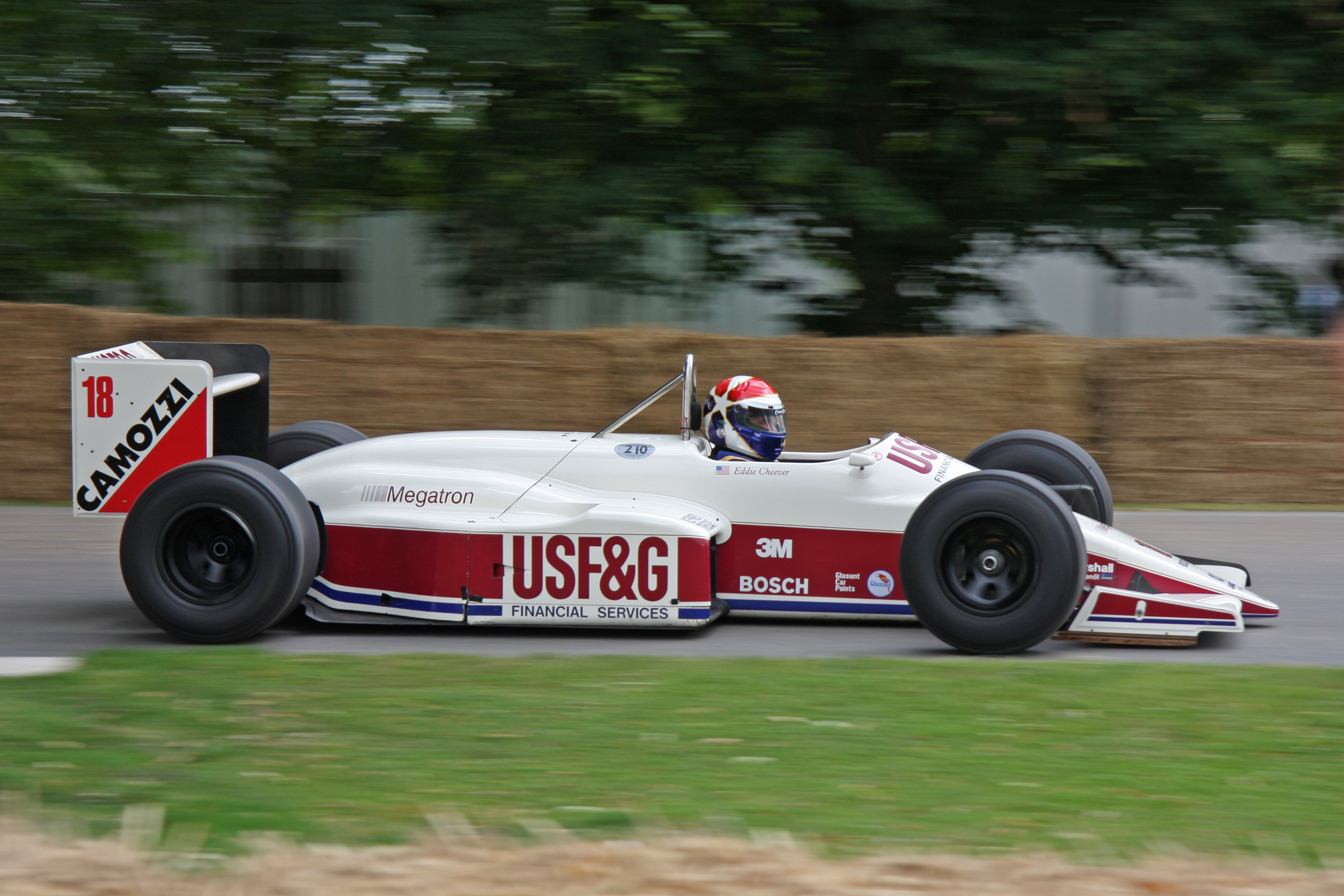
With the BMW badged as Megatron in this A10B chassis, drivers Eddie Cheever (pictured at the 2008 Goodwood Festival of Speed) and Derek Warwick ensured that 1988 was Arrows' most successful year in Formula One, thanks to frequent points finishes.

=== Formula One ===
During the 1982 season, the Brabham team, then owned by future F1 boss Bernie Ecclestone, used both the older Cosworth DFV V8 engine as well as the turbocharged BMW M12 in selected races in a development program. The BMW proved to be fast in its first year in Formula One, though its reliability, with turbocharging still in its infancy, was lacking. Reigning World Champion Nelson Piquet recorded the first win for the engine in F1 when he led home Brabham teammate Riccardo Patrese (in the Cosworth-powered car) at the 1982 Canadian Grand Prix.

In 1983, Brazilian driver Piquet won his second Formula One World Championship driving a Brabham BT52 powered exclusively by the M12, which by that year was producing approximately 850 bhp (630 kW) in qualifying trim and 640 bhp (480 kW) for the races. Piquet, who won the Brazilian, Italian and European Grands Prix that year, won the championship by just two points, ahead of Renault's Alain Prost (Renault had pioneered turbocharging in F1 in 1977, but would never win the World Championship in the original turbo era (1977-1988)). Piquet was the first driver to win a World Championship in a turbo-powered car.

The main advantage of the inline-four M12 over its V6 Ferrari and Renault opposition was that, with one fewer turbo, two fewer cylinders, and eight fewer valves, the BMW engine had lower frictional losses and, therefore, produced less waste heat. This allowed Brahbam's lead designer Gordon Murray the luxury of designing the BT52 with smaller radiators, which meant better aerodynamic efficiency and thus better straight-line speed. The BT52 was notable for its very skinny, short sidepods, especially compared to the Renault, giving it better penetration through the air on circuits with long straights.

1984 and 1985, by contrast, were lean years for the M12. The engine was generally regarded as the most powerful in F1 at the time, producing approximately 1,100 hp (820 kW) in qualifying trim by 1985, and Piquet took nine pole positions in 1984 alone. However, the engine's mechanical reliability and durability under full workload suffered severely, with engine blow-ups and turbo failures becoming common occurrences. Furthermore, with FISA imposing a maximum fuel limit of 220 litres per race (refuelling was allowed in 1982 and 1983), the four-cylinder BMW suffered from high fuel consumption which often led to drivers running out of fuel, and continued to suffer from poor reliability. Consequently, Piquet scored only three wins - the 1984 Canadian and Detroit races, and the 1985 French Grand Prix. These proved to be Brabham's final wins in Formula 1.

For 1986, the M12 was upgraded into the M12/13/1. (Bore 89.2 mm X Stroke 60 mm) 374.95 cc and 350 PS per cylinder 933.46 PS/litre. This version was claimed to have produced a maximum output of 1,400 hp (1,044 kW) at 11,000 rpm, and about 850–930 lb⋅ft (1,152–1,261 N⋅m) of torque in qualifying trim, which would make it the most powerful engine ever to race in Formula 1, turbocharged or otherwise. At the time, there was no way to accurately measure horsepower figures over 1,000, and so claimed output figures were generally accepted from the engineers' theoretical calculations; for example, 0.1 bar of turbo boost was rated to be worth approximately 20 hp (15 kW)). During the 1986 Italian Grand Prix at Monza, Gerhard Berger's BMW-powered Benetton B186 recorded the highest straight line speed by a turbocharged Formula One car when he was timed at 352.22 km/h (219 mph). In fact, the top five cars through the speed trap at Monza (Berger and teammate Teo Fabi, Brabham's Derek Warwick and Riccardo Patrese, and the Arrows of Thierry Boutsen) were all powered by the BMW M12.

Brabham tilted the upgraded engine sideways by 72° for use in the extremely low BT55, but the concept proved unsuccessful, most likely due to cooling issues in the tight compartment. Instead, Benetton, with the more conventional B186, were the leading BMW users in 1986, with Berger scoring his and the team's first (and the BMW engine's last until the 2001 San Marino Grand Prix) win at the Mexican Grand Prix.

At the 1986 French Grand Prix at the Paul Ricard Circuit, BMW announced their withdrawal from F1 at the end of 1986, but that they would continue to honour their contract and supply, Brabham, with their tilted M12s for 1987. Arrows team boss Jackie Oliver, with support from the team's primary sponsor USF&G, brokered a deal to continue the use of the upright BMW engines under the name of its subsidiary Megatron, Inc., founded by long-time F1 aficionado John J. Schmidt. The engines were serviced from Switzerland by Arrows' long time engine guru Heini Mader, a former mechanic of Jo Siffert.

==== Megatron ====
Megatron as a Formula One engine manufacturer
- Base: Switzerland
- Founder(s): John J. Schmidt
- Notable staff: Heini Mader

Formula One World Championship career
- First entry: 1987 Brazilian Grand Prix
- Last entry: 1988 Australian Grand Prix
- Races entered: 32
- Chassis: Arrows, Ligier
- Constructors' Championships: 0
- Drivers' Championships: 0
- Race victories: 0
- Podiums: 1
- Points: 35
- Pole positions: 0
- Fastest laps: 0

Rebadged as Megatron, the BMW engines were used by the Arrows team for the 1987 and 1988 seasons, as well as Ligier in 1987. By 1988, Arrows were one of only six teams still running turbocharged engines, and the Megatron was the oldest turbo engine still in use in Formula One, Ferrari having introduced a brand-new turbo engine the previous year.

The Megatron programme ended after 1988 as a result of rule changes that banned turbocharged engines from 1989 onwards, with Eddie Cheever scoring the old BMW engine's last podium finish with third place in the 1988 Italian Grand Prix at Monza. This race was also significant as it marked the first time Heini Mader had solved the problems caused by the FIA's boost limit valve, which limited turbo boost pressure to 4.0 bar in 1987 and 2.5 bar in 1988. By moving the valve closer to the engine, the problem of the turbo not delivering enough boost had been solved, and the Arrows A10B was among the fastest cars on the long Monza straights, faster even than the all-conquering McLaren MP4/4's Honda engines into which designer Steve Nichols had effectively incorporated elements of Gordon Murray's low-line Brabham design as well as featuring a more powerful V6 engine.

With turbos banned from the 1989 season, the Arrows team reverted to using 3,499 cc (213.5 cu in), naturally aspirated Ford DFR V8 power plants.

The M12's major shortcoming as a Formula One engine was its lack of throttle response due to turbo lag. Unlike the V6 and V8 turbocharged engines which ran with twin turbos (one for each bank of cylinders), the inline-4 BMW engine, like the other four-cylinder turbo engines used in F1 such as the Hart 415T and the Zakspeed 1500/4, only used a single turbocharger. The twin-turbo setups of the "V" engines eliminated much of the turbo lag. However, with only a single turbo, the BMW M12 suffered from approximately 2 seconds of turbo lag, meaning drivers often had to start accelerating through the apex of a corner. The power from the turbo was described by many (including Piquet and Berger) as coming on like a light switch which often induced sudden oversteer. Consequently, the BMW was usually seen at its most competitive at power circuits such as Kyalami, Imola, Paul Ricard, Silverstone, Hockenheim, the Österreichring, and Monza. On tighter tracks such as street circuits like Monaco and Detroit which required greater acceleration and less top speed, the BMW-powered cars often lagged behind their major rivals.

=== Formula One record ===
World Championships: 1 (Nelson Piquet in a Brabham in 1983)
Wins: 9 (Piquet 7, Riccardo Patrese 1, Gerhard Berger 1)
Pole positions: 15 (Piquet 12, Teo Fabi 2, Patrese 1)
Fastest laps: 14 (Piquet 9, Patrese 2, Berger 2, Fabi 1)

=== Complete Formula One Championship results ===
(key) (Results in bold indicate pole position; results in italics indicate fastest lap)

Year	Entrant	Chassis	Engine	Tyres	Drivers	1	2	3	4	5	6	7	8	9	10	11	12	13	14	15	16	Points	WCC
1968	Bayerische Motoren Werke	Lola T102	BMW M12/1 1.6 L4	D		RSA	ESP	MON	BEL	NED	FRA	GBR	GER	ITA	CAN	USA	MEX					**0**	**NC**
1968	Bayerische Motoren Werke	Lola T102	BMW M12/1 1.6 L4	D	(West Germany) Hubert Hahne								10									**0**	**NC**
1969	Bayerische Motoren Werke	BMW 269 (F2)	BMW M12/1 1.6 L4	D		RSA	ESP	MON	NED	FRA	GBR	GER	ITA	CAN	USA	MEX						—N/a*	
1969	Bayerische Motoren Werke	BMW 269 (F2)	BMW M12/1 1.6 L4	D	(West Germany) Hubert Hahne							DNS										—N/a*	
1969	Bayerische Motoren Werke	BMW 269 (F2)	BMW M12/1 1.6 L4	D	(West Germany) Gerhard Mitter							DNS										—N/a*	
1969	Bayerische Motoren Werke	BMW 269 (F2)	BMW M12/1 1.6 L4	D	(Austria) Dieter Quester							DNS										—N/a*	
1970–1980: Did not compete
1981	Parmalat Racing Team	Brabham BT50	BMW M12/13 1.5 L4 t	G		USW	BRA	ARG	SMR	BEL	MON	ESP	FRA	GBR	GER	AUT	NED	ITA	CAN	CPL		0	NC
1981	Parmalat Racing Team	Brabham BT50	BMW M12/13 1.5 L4 t	G	(Brazil) Nelson Piquet									PO								0	NC
1982	Parmalat Racing Team	Brabham BT50	BMW M12/13 1.5 L4 t	G		RSA	BRA	USW	SMR	BEL	MON	DET	CAN	NED	GBR	FRA	GER	AUT	SUI	ITA	CPL	22	7th
1982	Parmalat Racing Team	Brabham BT50	BMW M12/13 1.5 L4 t	G	(Brazil) Nelson Piquet	Ret				5	Ret	DNQ	1	2	Ret	Ret	Ret^{F}	Ret^{P}^{F}	4	Ret	Ret	22	7th
1982	Parmalat Racing Team	Brabham BT50	BMW M12/13 1.5 L4 t	G	(Italy) Riccardo Patrese	Ret				Ret				15	Ret	Ret^{F}	Ret	Ret	5	Ret	Ret	22	7th
1983	Fila Sport	Brabham BT52	BMW M12/13 1.5 L4 t	M		BRA	USW	FRA	SMR	MON	BEL	DET	CAN	GBR	GER	AUT	NED	ITA	EUR	RSA		**72**	**3rd**
1983	Fila Sport	Brabham BT52	BMW M12/13 1.5 L4 t	M	(Brazil) Nelson Piquet	1^{F}	Ret	2	Ret	2^{F}	4	4	Ret	2	13	3	Ret^{P}	1^{F}	1	3^{F}		**72**	**3rd**
1983	Fila Sport	Brabham BT52	BMW M12/13 1.5 L4 t	M	(Italy) Riccardo Patrese	Ret	10	Ret	Ret^{F}	Ret	Ret	Ret	Ret	Ret	3	Ret	9	Ret^{P}	7	1		**72**	**3rd**
1983	Team ATS	ATS D6	BMW M12/13 1.5 L4 t	G	(West Germany) Manfred Winkelhock	16	Ret	Ret	11	Ret	Ret	Ret	9	Ret	DNQ	Ret	DSQ	Ret	8	Ret		0	NC
1984	MRD International	Brabham BT53	BMW M12/13 1.5 L4 t	M		BRA	RSA	BEL	SMR	FRA	MON	CAN	DET	DAL	GBR	GER	AUT	NED	ITA	EUR	POR	38	4th
1984	MRD International	Brabham BT53	BMW M12/13 1.5 L4 t	M	(Brazil) Nelson Piquet	Ret	Ret^{P}	9	Ret^{P}^{F}	Ret	Ret	1^{P}^{F}	1^{P}	Ret	7^{P}	Ret	2^{P}	Ret	Ret^{P}	3^{P}^{F}	6^{P}	38	4th
1984	MRD International	Brabham BT53	BMW M12/13 1.5 L4 t	M	(Italy) Teo Fabi	Ret	Ret	Ret	Ret	9			3		Ret	Ret	4	5	Ret	Ret		38	4th
1984	MRD International	Brabham BT53	BMW M12/13 1.5 L4 t	M	(Italy) Corrado Fabi						Ret	Ret		7								38	4th
1984	MRD International	Brabham BT53	BMW M12/13 1.5 L4 t	M	(West Germany) Manfred Winkelhock																10	38	4th
1984	Team ATS	ATS D7	BMW M12/13 1.5 L4 t	P	(West Germany) Manfred Winkelhock	EX	Ret	Ret	Ret	Ret	Ret	8	Ret	8	Ret	Ret	DNS	Ret	DNS			0	NC
1984	Team ATS	ATS D7	BMW M12/13 1.5 L4 t	P	(Austria) Gerhard Berger												12		6*	Ret	13	0	NC
1984	Barclay Nordica Arrows BMW	Arrows A7	BMW M12/13 1.5 L4 t	G	(Switzerland) Marc Surer				Ret					Ret	11	Ret	6	Ret	Ret	Ret	Ret	3	9th
1984	Barclay Nordica Arrows BMW	Arrows A7	BMW M12/13 1.5 L4 t	G	(Belgium) Thierry Boutsen			Ret		11	DNQ	Ret	Ret	Ret	Ret	Ret	5	Ret	10	9	Ret	3	9th
1985	Motor Racing Developments	Brabham BT54	BMW M12/13 1.5 L4 t	P		BRA	POR	SMR	MON	CAN	DET	FRA	GBR	GER	AUT	NED	ITA	BEL	EUR	RSA	AUS	26	5th
1985	Motor Racing Developments	Brabham BT54	BMW M12/13 1.5 L4 t	P	(Brazil) Nelson Piquet	Ret	Ret	8	Ret	Ret	6	1	4	Ret	Ret	8^{P}	2	5	Ret	Ret	Ret	26	5th
1985	Motor Racing Developments	Brabham BT54	BMW M12/13 1.5 L4 t	P	(France) François Hesnault	Ret	Ret	Ret	DNQ													26	5th
1985	Motor Racing Developments	Brabham BT54	BMW M12/13 1.5 L4 t	P	(Switzerland) Marc Surer					15	8	8	6	Ret	6	10	4	8	Ret	Ret	Ret	26	5th
1985	Barclay Arrows BMW	Arrows A8	BMW M12/13 1.5 L4 t	G	(Austria) Gerhard Berger	Ret	Ret	Ret	Ret	13	11	Ret	8	7	Ret	9	Ret	7	10	5	6	14	8th
1985	Barclay Arrows BMW	Arrows A8	BMW M12/13 1.5 L4 t	G	(Belgium) Thierry Boutsen	11	Ret	2	9	9	7	9	Ret	4	8	Ret	9	10	6	6	Ret	14	8th
1986	Motor Racing Developments	Brabham BT54; Brabham BT55	BMW M12/13/1 1.5 L4 t	P		BRA	ESP	SMR	MON	BEL	CAN	DET	FRA	GBR	GER	HUN	AUT	ITA	POR	MEX	AUS	2	9th
1986	Motor Racing Developments	Brabham BT54; Brabham BT55	BMW M12/13/1 1.5 L4 t	P	(Italy) Riccardo Patrese	Ret	Ret	6	Ret	8	Ret	6	7	Ret	Ret	Ret	Ret	Ret	Ret	13	Ret	2	9th
1986	Motor Racing Developments	Brabham BT54; Brabham BT55	BMW M12/13/1 1.5 L4 t	P	(Italy) Elio de Angelis	8	Ret	Ret	Ret													2	9th
1986	Motor Racing Developments	Brabham BT54; Brabham BT55	BMW M12/13/1 1.5 L4 t	P	(United Kingdom) Derek Warwick						Ret	10	9	8	7	Ret	DNS	Ret	Ret	Ret	Ret	2	9th
1986	Barclay Arrows BMW	Arrows A8; Arrows A9	BMW M12/13 1.5 L4 t	G	(Switzerland) Marc Surer	Ret	Ret	9	9	9												1	10th
1986	Barclay Arrows BMW	Arrows A8; Arrows A9	BMW M12/13 1.5 L4 t	G	(West Germany) Christian Danner							Ret	11	DNS	Ret	Ret	6	8	11	9	Ret	1	10th
1986	Barclay Arrows BMW	Arrows A8; Arrows A9	BMW M12/13 1.5 L4 t	G	(Belgium) Thierry Boutsen	Ret	7	7	8	Ret	Ret	Ret	NC	NC	Ret	Ret	Ret	7	10	7	Ret	1	10th
1986	Benetton Formula Ltd	Benetton B186	BMW M12/13 1.5 L4 t	P	(Italy) Teo Fabi	10	5	Ret	Ret	7	Ret	Ret	Ret	Ret	Ret	Ret	Ret^{P}	Ret^{P}^{F}	8	Ret	10	19	6th
1986	Benetton Formula Ltd	Benetton B186	BMW M12/13 1.5 L4 t	P	(Austria) Gerhard Berger	6	6	3	Ret	10	Ret	Ret	Ret	Ret	10^{F}	Ret	7^{F}	5	Ret	1	Ret	19	6th
1987	Motor Racing Developments	Brabham BT56	BMW M12/13/1 1.5 L4 t	G		BRA	SMR	BEL	MON	DET	FRA	GBR	GER	HUN	AUT	ITA	POR	ESP	MEX	JPN	AUS	10	8th
1987	Motor Racing Developments	Brabham BT56	BMW M12/13/1 1.5 L4 t	G	(Italy) Riccardo Patrese	Ret	9	Ret	Ret	9	Ret	Ret	Ret	5	Ret	Ret	Ret	13	3	11		10	8th
1987	Motor Racing Developments	Brabham BT56	BMW M12/13/1 1.5 L4 t	G	(Italy) Stefano Modena																Ret	10	8th
1987	Motor Racing Developments	Brabham BT56	BMW M12/13/1 1.5 L4 t	G	(Italy) Andrea de Cesaris	Ret	Ret	3	Ret	Ret	Ret	Ret	Ret	Ret	Ret	Ret	Ret	Ret	Ret	Ret	8	10	8th
1987	USF&G Arrows Megatron	Arrows A10	Megatron M12/13 1.5 L4 t	G	(United Kingdom) Derek Warwick	Ret	11	Ret	Ret	Ret	Ret	5	Ret	6	Ret	Ret	13	10	Ret	10	Ret	11	7th
1987	USF&G Arrows Megatron	Arrows A10	Megatron M12/13 1.5 L4 t	G	(United States) Eddie Cheever	Ret	Ret	4	Ret	6	Ret	Ret	Ret	8	Ret	Ret	6	8	4	9	Ret	11	7th
1987	Ligier Loto	Ligier JS29B; Ligier JS29C	Megatron M12/13 1.5 L4 t	G	(France) René Arnoux		DNS	6	11	10	Ret	Ret	Ret	Ret	10	10	Ret	Ret	Ret	Ret	Ret	1	11th
1987	Ligier Loto	Ligier JS29B; Ligier JS29C	Megatron M12/13 1.5 L4 t	G	(Italy) Piercarlo Ghinzani		Ret	7	12	NC	Ret	EX	Ret	12	8	8	Ret	Ret	Ret	13	Ret	1	11th
1988	USF&G Arrows Megatron	Arrows A10B	Megatron M12/13 1.5 L4 t	G		BRA	SMR	MON	MEX	CAN	DET	FRA	GBR	GER	HUN	BEL	ITA	POR	ESP	JPN	AUS	23	5th
1988	USF&G Arrows Megatron	Arrows A10B	Megatron M12/13 1.5 L4 t	G	(United Kingdom) Derek Warwick	4	9	4	5	7	Ret	Ret	6	7	Ret	5	4	4	Ret	Ret	Ret	23	5th
1988	USF&G Arrows Megatron	Arrows A10B	Megatron M12/13 1.5 L4 t	G	(United States) Eddie Cheever	8	7	Ret	6	Ret	Ret	11	7	10	Ret	6	3	Ret	Ret	Ret	Ret	23	5th

* Ineligible for points.
