= Brabham BT54 =

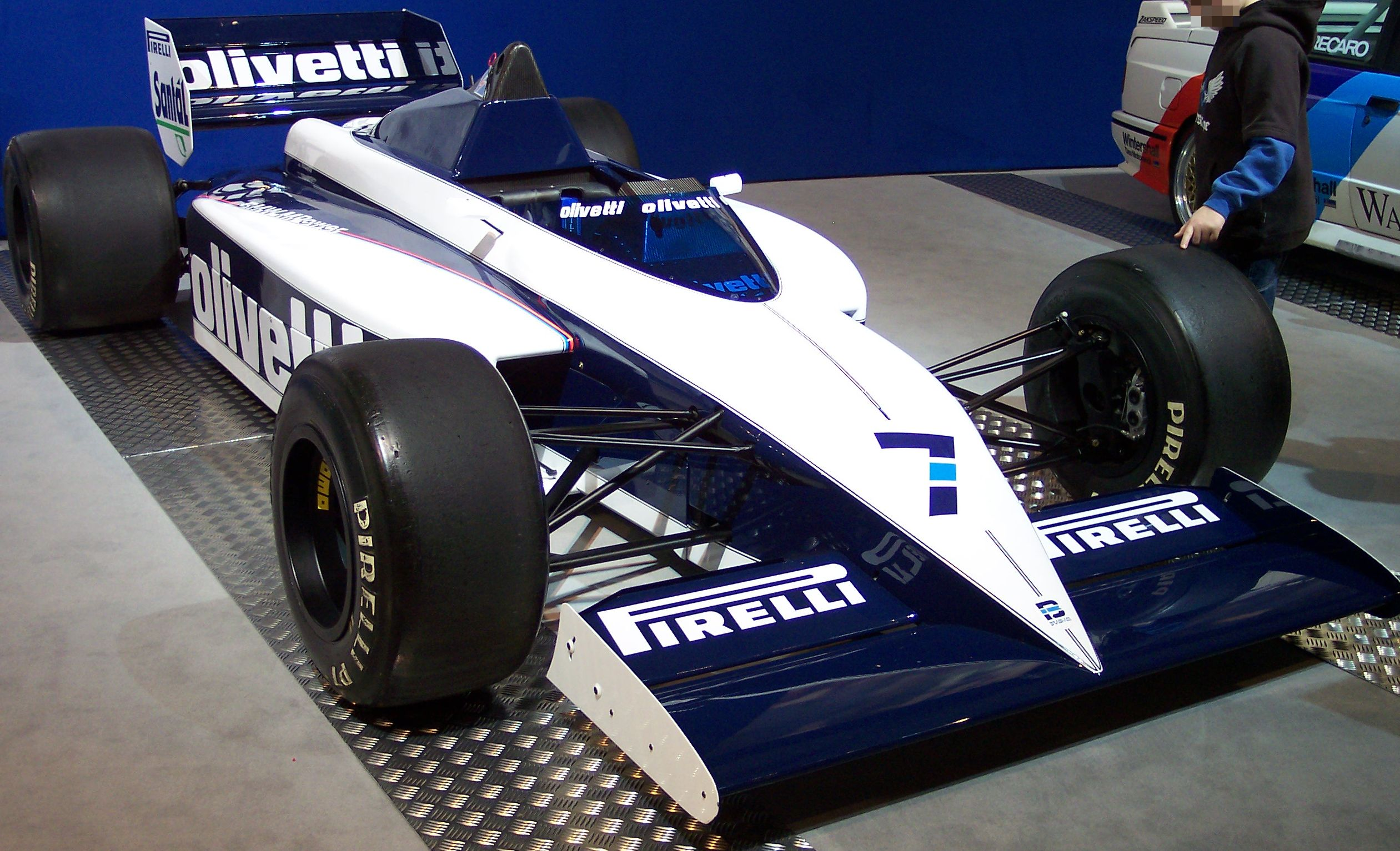
- Category: Formula One
- Constructor: Brabham
- Designers: Gordon Murray (Technical Director); David North (Chief Designer); Paul Rosche (Chief Engine Designer (BMW))
- Predecessor: BT53
- Successor: BT55

Technical specifications
- Chassis: Carbon fibre monocoque
- Suspension (front): Double wishbones, push-rod operated coil springs over dampers
- Suspension (rear): Double wishbones, push-rod operated coil springs over dampers
- Axle track: Front: 1,682 mm (66 in); Rear: 1,606 mm (63 in)
- Wheelbase: 2,962 mm (117 in)
- Engine: BMW M12/13, 1,499 cc (91.5 cu in), Straight 4, turbocharger, mid-engine, longitudinally mounted
- Transmission: Brabham / Hewland 6-speed manual
- Weight: 540 kg (1,190 lb)
- Fuel: Castrol
- Tyres: Pirelli

Competition history
- Notable entrants: Motor Racing Developments
- Notable drivers: 7. (Brazil) Nelson Piquet; 8. (France) François Hesnault; 8. (Switzerland) Marc Surer
- Debut: 1985 Brazilian Grand Prix
Races	Wins	Poles	F/Laps
17	1	1	0
- Constructors' Championships: 0
- Drivers' Championships: 0

The Brabham BT54 was a Formula One racing car designed by Gordon Murray for the Brabham team for the 1985 Formula One season. The car was powered by the BMW M12 4cyl turbo engine (generally agreed to be the most powerful engine in Formula One at the time) and used Pirelli tyres.

== Design and testing ==
Like its immediate predecessors, the BT54 had most of its weight towards the rear of the car to help improve traction. With FISA's ban on the 'winglets' on the rear wings that had been pioneered by Ferrari in 1983, Murray chose instead to put the small wings on the outside rear edges of the cars sidepods (Lotus designer Gérard Ducarouge had done the same with their 97T).

Like most of its rivals, Brabham had used Michelin tyres in 1984. However, when the French company pulled out of Grand Prix racing at the end of that season, team owner Bernie Ecclestone took a gamble and instead of signing with Goodyear for their proven rubber, signed with the Italian company Pirelli instead.

The car proved to be competitive, but somewhat unsuccessful even in the hands of two time world champion Nelson Piquet. The reason for this turned out to be the Pirelli tyres which proved to be nowhere near as good as the Goodyear tyres used by rivals McLaren, Lotus, Ferrari and Williams. Part of the BT54's problem was that unlike the other teams who had tested their cars during the European winter, Piquet had spent a southern hemisphere summer testing the car and the Pirelli tyres at the Kyalami circuit in South Africa and at the Jacarepagua circuit in Brazil (it was reported that he had completed the equivalent of 75 full races in testing). The testing was completed in hot conditions which suited the Pirellis as it allowed them to quickly get up to working temperature which masked their major flaw - in cooler temperatures, the Pirelli tyres just could not get up to working temperature as quickly as the Goodyear tyres. Unfortunately, once the European races started the problem surfaced of the front tyres taking a long time to reach working temperature (much longer than the Goodyears) which caused severe understeer, a situation was not helped by the unseasonably cool European summer or the lack of weight at the front of the car.

== Season summary ==
The only track and conditions on the 1985 calendar that suited the tyres was the Paul Ricard Circuit used for the French Grand Prix, run in very hot weather that year and, combined with the BMW engine that was very effective on the Ricard circuit's long Mistral straight Piquet used these factors to his full advantage. He qualified 5th and won his only Grand Prix of 1985. The team's second driver Marc Surer recorded the season's fastest speed trap time during qualifying at Paul Ricard when the turbocharged BMW engine pushed the BT54 to 335 km/h (208 mph) on the 1.8 km (1.1 mi) long Mistral Straight. This speed was almost emulated at Kyalami for the South African Grand Prix when both Piquet and Surer were trapped at 332 km/h (206 mph) on the circuit's 1.65 km (1 mi) long front straight.

The car's aerodynamics, paired with its potent BMW engine, saw that the BT54 did well on high-speed circuits and was often the fastest car down the straights, and Piquet often qualified higher up the grid at circuits like Paul Ricard, Silverstone, the Österreichring, Zandvoort, Spa-Francorchamps and Kyalami. However, the car was not as competitive on slow circuits, with Piquet never qualifying higher than 10th or finishing higher than 5th at any of the 3 street circuits (Monaco, Detroit, Adelaide) used in 1985. Other than the Dutch Grand Prix at Zandvoort, where Piquet got his only pole position for the season (compared to his 9 poles in 1984), the BT54 was generally off the pace of the front runners leaving Piquet little chance of regaining the World Drivers' Championship. Piquet's pole in the Netherlands came to nothing when he stalled at the start and by the time he was push started, he was already two-thirds of a lap behind.

At the European Grand Prix at Brands Hatch, Piquet qualified a strong 2nd, but on lap 7 drove into Keke Rosberg who had spun his Williams while challenging Ayrton Senna's Lotus for the lead at Surtees (with nowhere to go and no time to react, Piquet hit the Williams, taking off the BT54's nose cone and badly damaging the front left wheel and suspension). Marc Surer managed to get his BT54 up to 2nd before retiring with a fiery engine failure 13 laps from home.

Piquet, François Hesnault and Marc Surer, who replaced Hesnault from the Canadian Grand Prix for the rest of the season, could only score 26 points to finish 5th in the Constructors' Championship.

== Aftermath ==
The BT54 was replaced for the 1986 season by the Brabham BT55, although the team did use the BT54 for the 1986 British Grand Prix at Brands Hatch after the lack of results from the radical lowline BT55.

After seven seasons, 2 World Drivers' Championships and 12 wins, the BT54 was the last car Nelson Piquet drove for the Brabham team. With Brabham's declining competitiveness becoming apparent (giving Piquet just three wins in the two years since his 1983 championship, during which time McLaren drivers Niki Lauda and Alain Prost had won 18 races between them and each respective World Championship), the Brazilian signed to drive for Williams-Honda in 1986. The move to Williams proved to be fruitful for Nelson, winning seven races in two seasons as well as the 1987 World Championship.

== Gallery ==
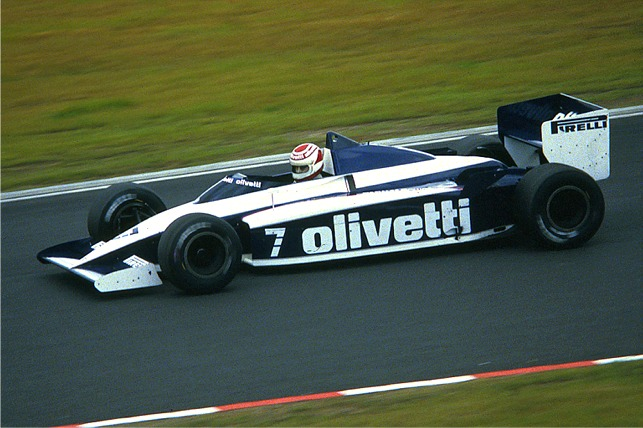
Nelson Piquet driving the BT54 at the 1985 German Grand Prix at the Nürburgring

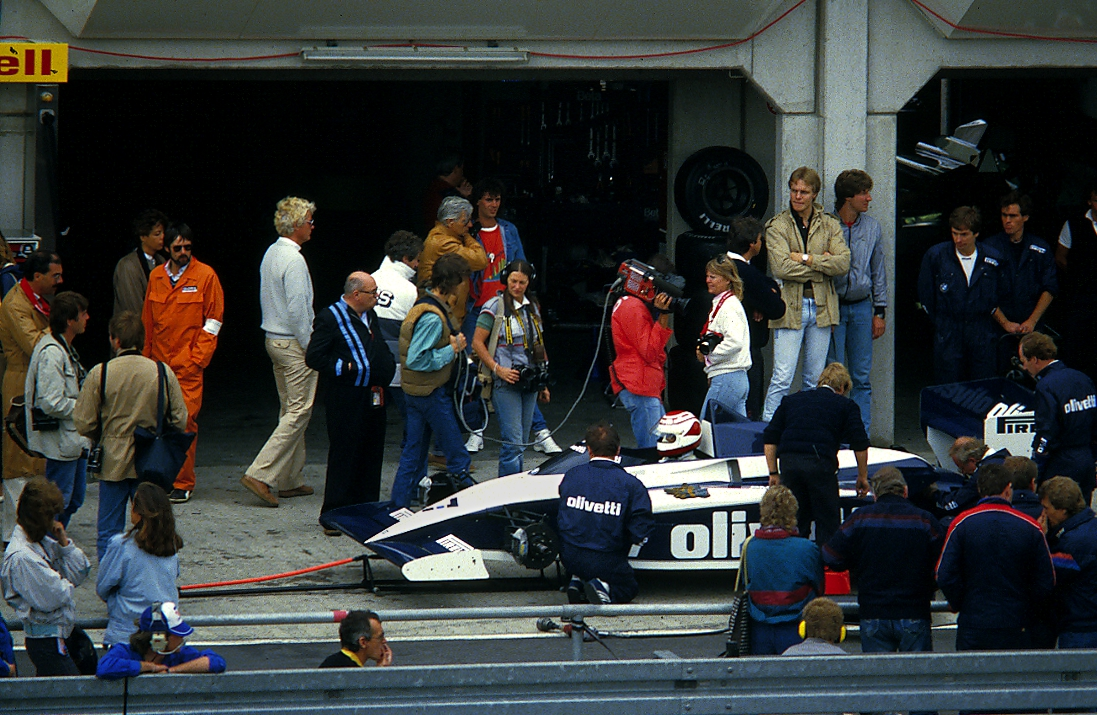
Nelson Piquet 1985 at Nürburgring in the pits

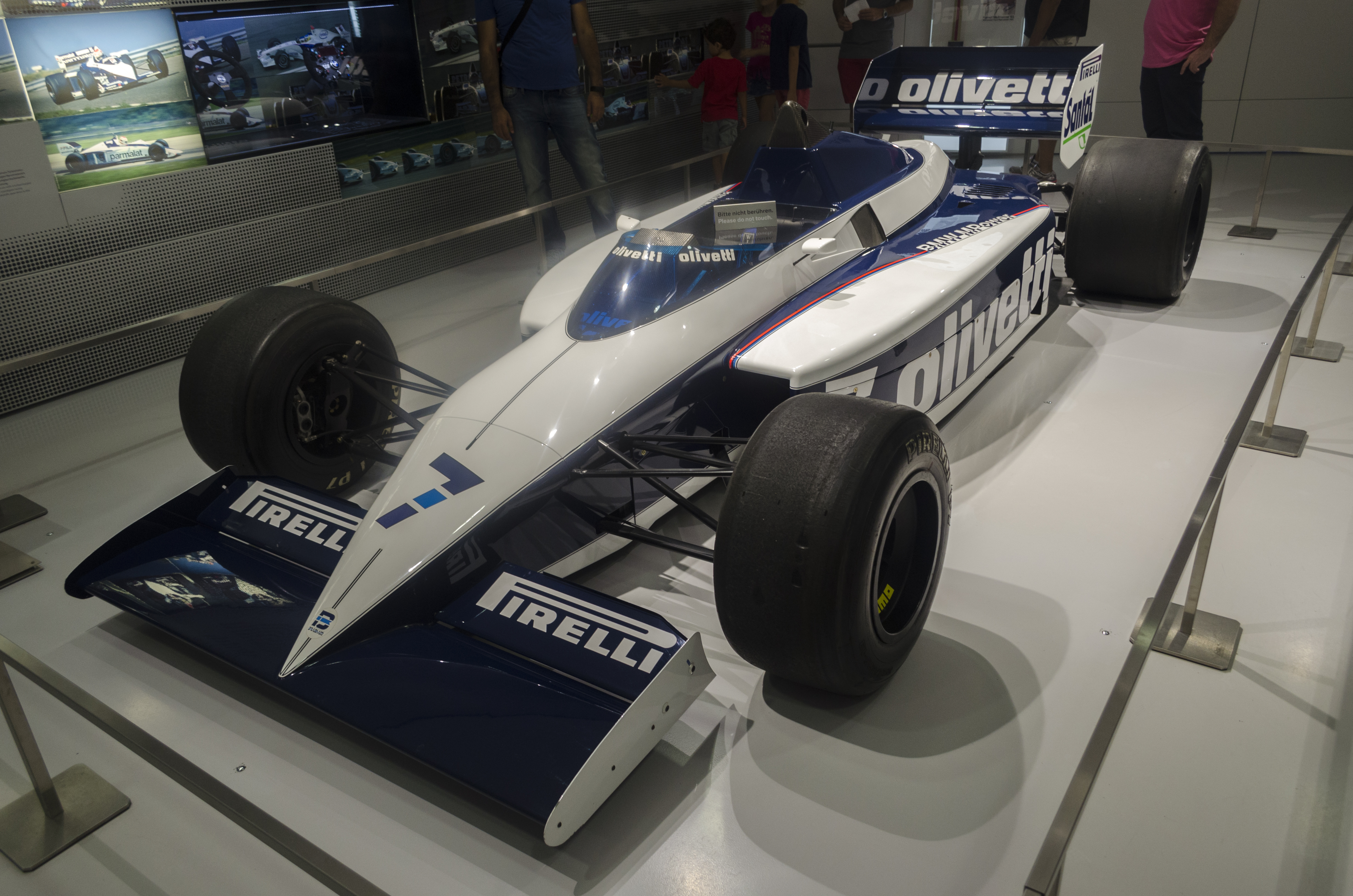
BT54 on display at the BMW Museum in Munich (Germany), July 2017

== Complete Formula One results ==
(key) (results in bold indicate pole position)

Year	Entrant	Engine	Tyres	Drivers	1	2	3	4	5	6	7	8	9	10	11	12	13	14	15	16	Points	WCC
1985	Motor Racing Developments	BMW M12/13; S4 tc	P		BRA	POR	SMR	MON	CAN	DET	FRA	GBR	GER	AUT	NED	ITA	BEL	EUR	RSA	AUS	26	5th
1985	Motor Racing Developments	BMW M12/13; S4 tc	P	Nelson Piquet	Ret	Ret	8	Ret	Ret	6	1	4	Ret	Ret	**8**	2	5	Ret	Ret	Ret	26	5th
1985	Motor Racing Developments	BMW M12/13; S4 tc	P	François Hesnault	Ret	Ret	Ret	DNQ													26	5th
1985	Motor Racing Developments	BMW M12/13; S4 tc	P	Marc Surer					15	8	8	6	Ret	6	10	4	8	Ret	Ret	Ret	26	5th
1986	Motor Racing Developments	BMW M12/13; S4 tc	P		BRA	ESP	SMR	MON	BEL	CAN	DET	FRA	GBR	GER	HUN	AUT	ITA	POR	MEX	AUS	2	9th
1986	Motor Racing Developments	BMW M12/13; S4 tc	P	Riccardo Patrese									Ret								2	9th
