= Brabham BT52 =

Formula One racing car

Brabham BT52 Brabham BT52B
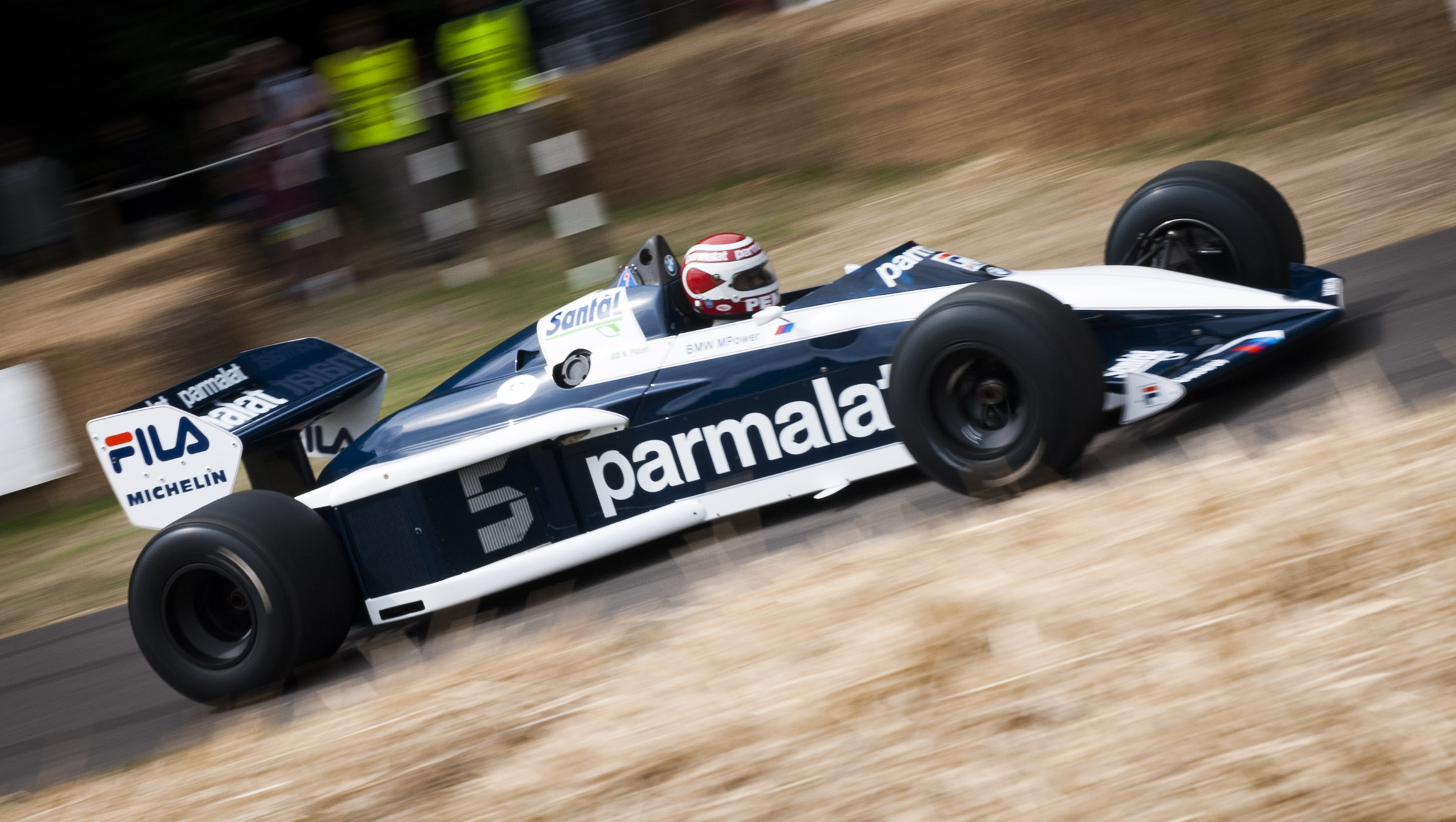
- Nelson Piquet driving the BT52 at the 2013 Goodwood Festival of Speed.
- Category: Formula One
- Constructor: Brabham
- Designer(s): Gordon Murray (Technical Director); David North (Chief Designer); Paul Rosche (Chief Engine Designer (BMW))
- Predecessor: BT50
- Successor: BT53

Technical specifications
- Chassis: Carbon fibre monocoque with rear subframe
- Suspension (front): Double wishbones, push-rod operated coil springs over dampers
- Suspension (rear): Double wishbones, push-rod operated coil springs over dampers
- Axle track: BT52: Front: 1,778 mm (70.0 in); Rear: 1,657 mm (65.2 in); BT52B: Front: 1,753 mm (69.0 in); Rear: 1,651 mm (65.0 in)
- Wheelbase: BT52: 2,860 mm (113 in); BT52B: 2,845 mm (112.0 in)
- Engine: BMW M12/13, 1,499 cc (91.5 cu in), Straight 4, turbo, mid-engine, longitudinally mounted
- Transmission: Brabham/Hewland 5/6-speed manual Weismann Differential
- Weight: 540 kg (1,190 lb)
- Fuel: Castrol
- Tyres: Michelin

Competition history
- Notable entrants: Fila Sport Brabham BMW
- Notable drivers: 5. (Brazil) Nelson Piquet; 6. (Italy) Riccardo Patrese
- Debut: 1983 Brazilian Grand Prix
Races	Wins	Poles	F/Laps
15	4	2	4
- Constructors' Championships: 0
- Drivers' Championships: 1 (1983, Nelson Piquet)

The Brabham BT52 was a Formula One car designed for the Brabham team by longtime Brabham designer Gordon Murray for the 1983 season. The car ran on Michelin tyres and was powered by the BMW M12/13 four-cylinder turbocharged engine, which in 1983 produced a maximum power of approximately 850 bhp (630 kW) in qualifying trim, detuned to around 650 bhp (480 kW) for the proper races. Its drivers were 1981 World Champion Nelson Piquet and Riccardo Patrese.

== History ==
After the ground effect cars were banned at the end of the previous season, the FIA mandated that all F1 cars be designed with flat undersides for safety reasons. With just six weeks until the opening race in Brazil, this left Brabham with three fully built BT51s ready to go that were now useless, so Murray started from scratch and he designed the BT52. The previously crucial sidepods were now generating lift rather than suction and so the BT52 had short, angular sidepods to keep lift at a minimum. Murray also took a gamble and moved approximately 70% of the car's weight to the rear in an effort to obtain more traction. The car featured a distinctive dart-shaped profile and oversized rear wing in an effort to claw back as much downforce as possible, while the monocoque was built from aluminium and carbon fibre composite to keep weight as low as possible. The 1983 season saw refuelling stops reintroduced after successful experiments in 1982 so the BT52's fuel system was designed with this in mind and had a small fuel tank positioned high up behind the driver.

The car was easy to drive and Piquet used it to good effect that season. Fighting with Alain Prost in the Renault and René Arnoux of Ferrari, it seemed he would lose out on the title after a run of mid season bad luck. After German company Wintershall developed a special batch of fuel and further development to the car was done, he became the first driver to win the world championship with a turbo engine after winning three races, Brazil (Round 1), Italy (Round 13) and European (Round 14), and scoring consistently with three 2nd and two 3rd places. Patrese on the other hand seemed to corner the market on Brabham's bad luck and while often as quick or quicker than Piquet (including leading the San Marino Grand Prix before crashing out with only six laps remaining, and grabbing pole at Monza) he didn't score a point until his third place finish in Round 10 at the German Grand Prix. His only other points finish being his win at the season ending South African Grand Prix at Kyalami.

With Piquet winning his second World Drivers' Championship with 59 points, and Patrese finishing ninth on 13 points, Brabham finished third in the Constructors' Championship with 72 points, 7 behind second placed Renault and 17 behind winners Ferrari. The BT52 was updated after the Canadian Grand Prix to the BT52B and proceeded to win three of the remaining seven races of the season. The two variants of the chassis can easily be distinguished as the colour scheme was also reversed at the same time. A further update came later in the season when Brabham adopted the Ferrari style winglets on the rear wing in order to generate more downforce. The BT52 was replaced for the 1984 Formula One season by the Brabham BT53.

== Gallery ==
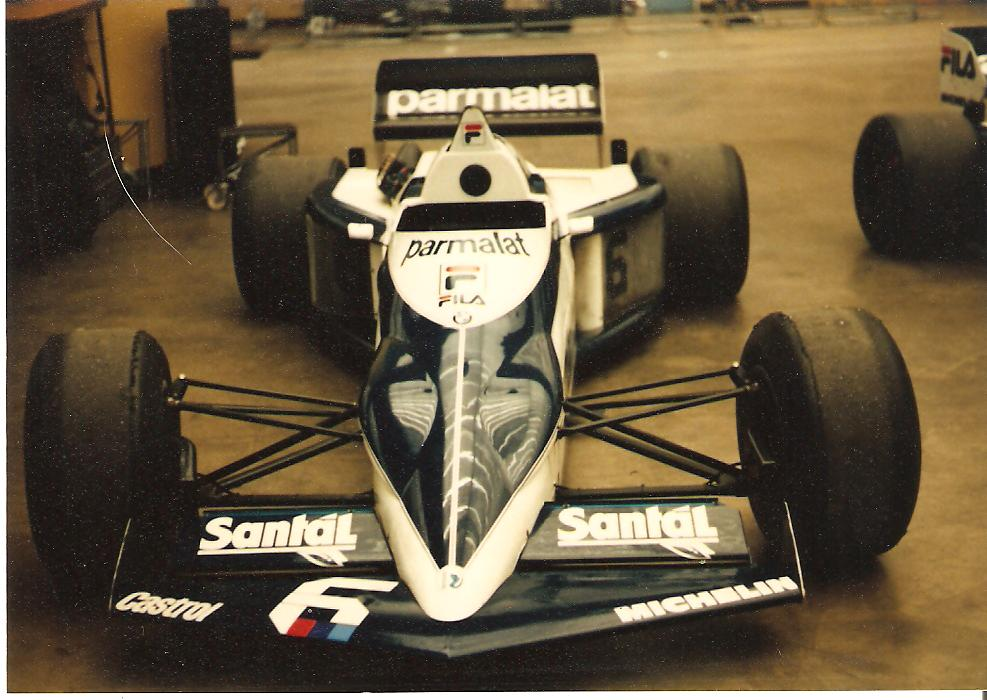
Brabham BT52 in the garages at the 1983 Detroit Grand Prix

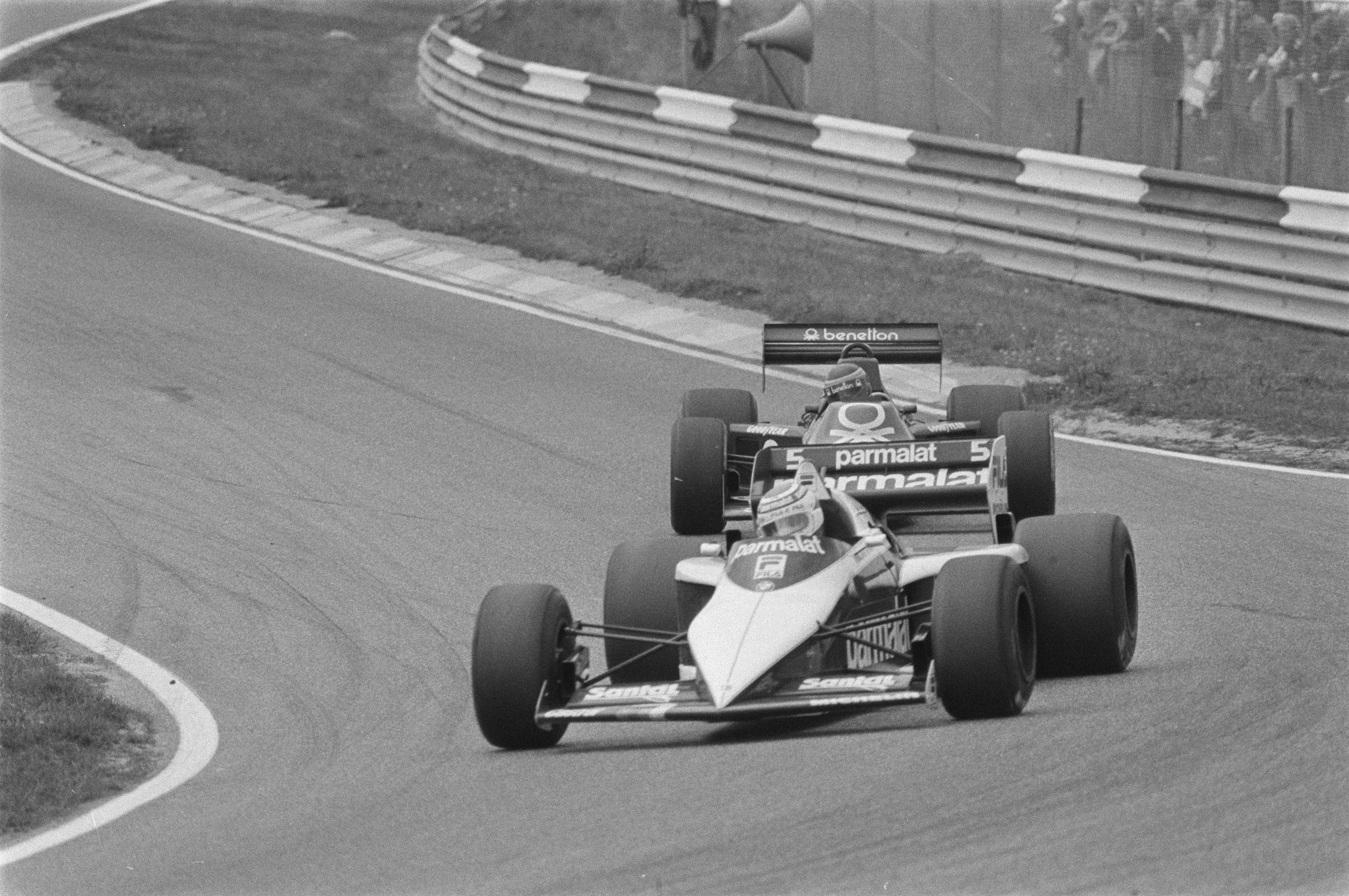
Piquet leading Michele Alboreto at the 1983 Dutch Grand Prix

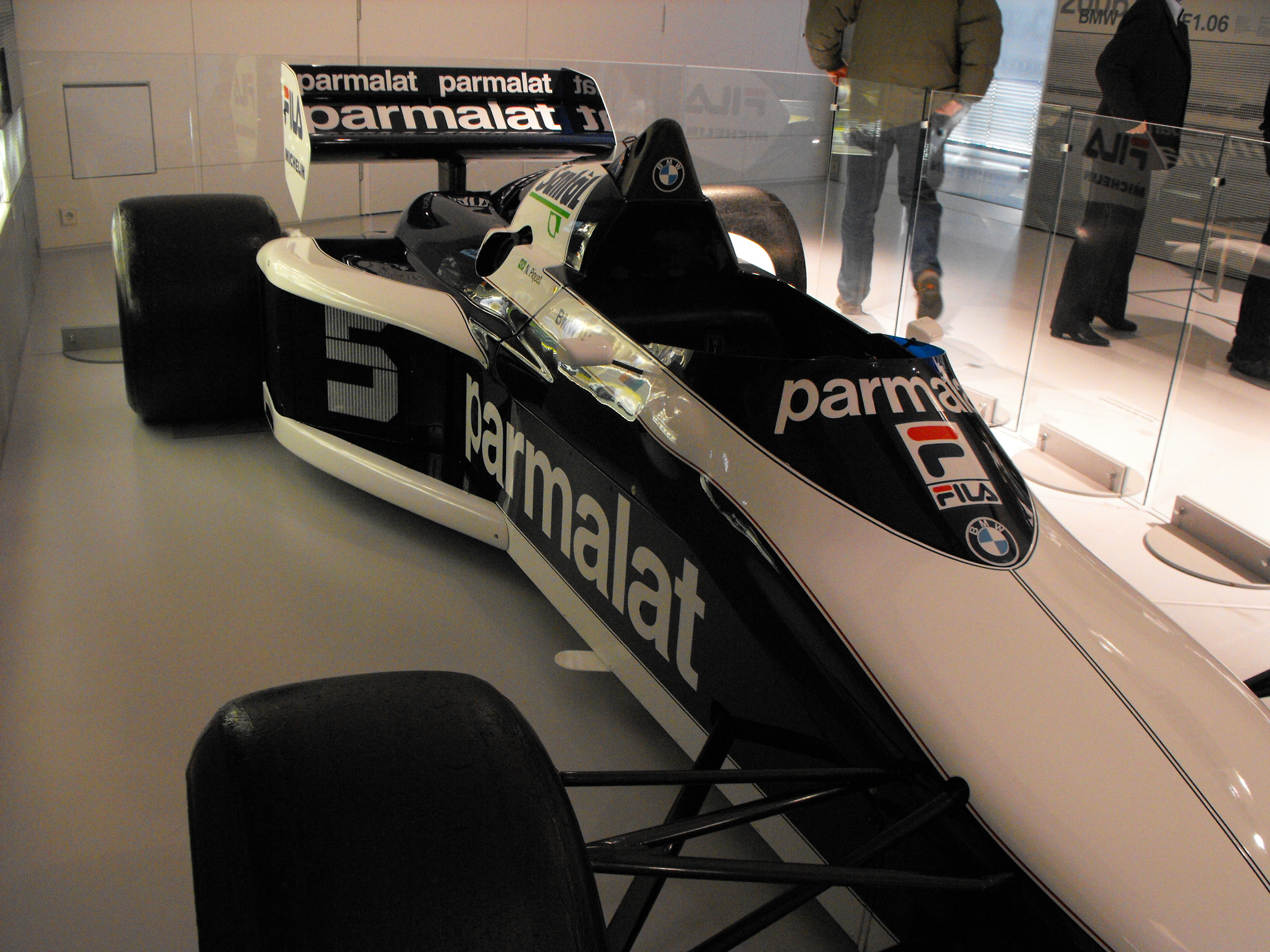
Brabham BT52, BMW Museum, Munich, Germany.

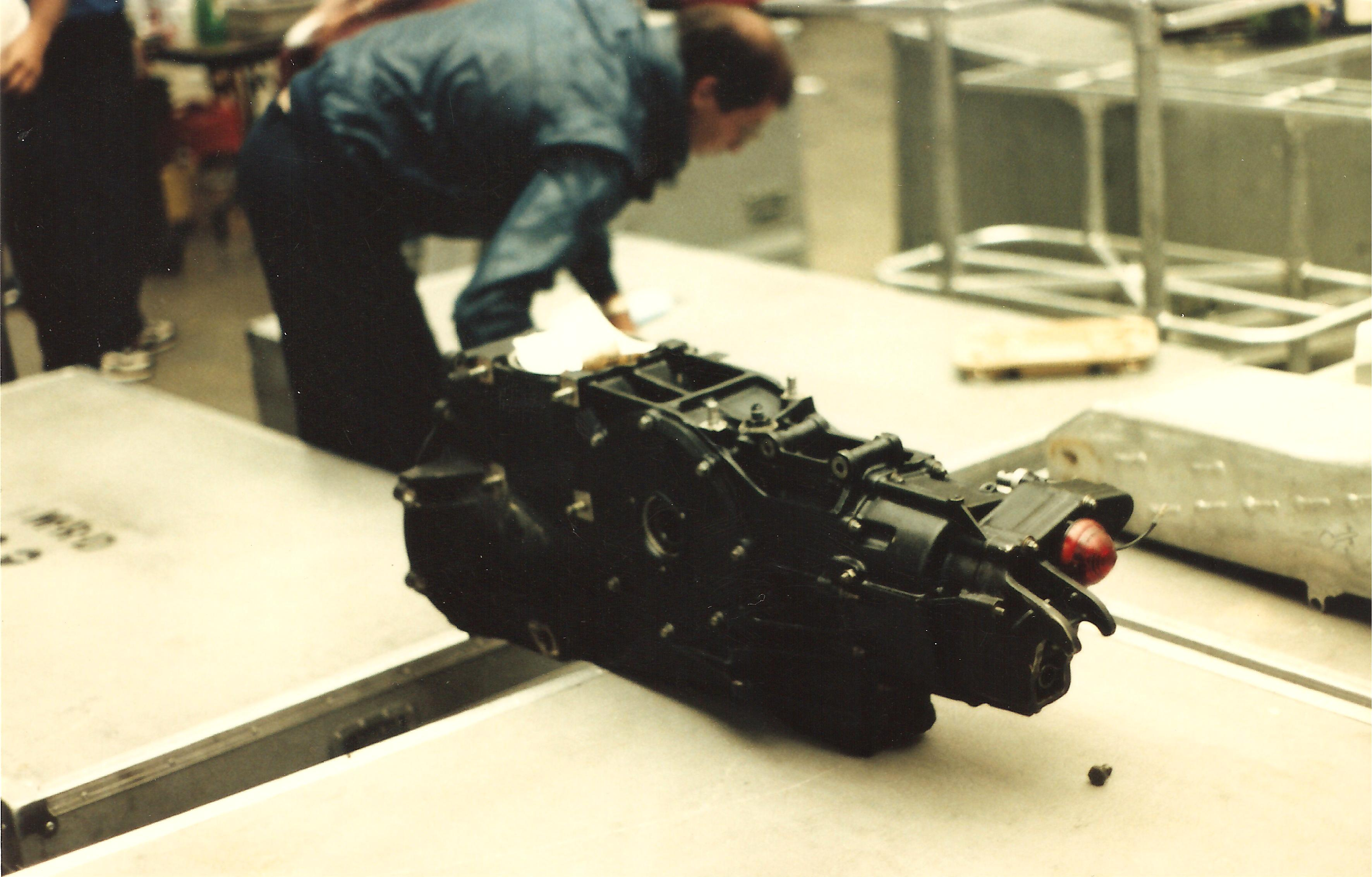
BT52 gearbox

== Complete Formula One World Championship results ==
(key) (Races in bold indicate pole position; races in italics indicate fastest lap)

Year	Entrant	Chassis	Engine	Drivers	1	2	3	4	5	6	7	8	9	10	11	12	13	14	15	Pts	WCC
1983	Fila Sport Brabham BMW		BMW M12/13; S4 tc		BRA	USW	FRA	SMR	MON	BEL	DET	CAN	GBR	GER	AUT	NED	ITA	EUR	RSA	**72**	**3rd**
1983	Fila Sport Brabham BMW	BT52	BMW M12/13; S4 tc	Nelson Piquet	1	Ret	2	Ret	2	4	4	Ret								**72**	**3rd**
1983	Fila Sport Brabham BMW	BT52B	BMW M12/13; S4 tc	Nelson Piquet									2	13†	3	**Ret**	1	1	3	**72**	**3rd**
1983	Fila Sport Brabham BMW	BT52	BMW M12/13; S4 tc	Riccardo Patrese	Ret	10	Ret	Ret	Ret	Ret	Ret	Ret								**72**	**3rd**
1983	Fila Sport Brabham BMW	BT52B	BMW M12/13; S4 tc	Riccardo Patrese									Ret	3	Ret	9	**Ret**	7	1	**72**	**3rd**

† Did not finish, but was classified as he had completed more than 90% of the race distance.

Awards
Preceded by Porsche 956	Autosport; Racing Car Of The Year; 1983	Succeeded by McLaren MP4/2
