= 1984 Canadian Grand Prix =

- Race 7 of 16 in the 1984 Formula One World Championship
- Circuit Gilles Villeneuve

Race details
- Date: 17 June 1984
- Official name: XXIII Grand Prix Labatt du Canada
- Location: Circuit Gilles Villeneuve; Montreal, Quebec, Canada
- Course: Temporary street circuit
- Course length: 4.410 km (2.740 miles)
- Distance: 70 laps, 308.700 km (191.817 miles)
- Weather: Dry with temperatures approaching 26 °C (79 °F); wind speeds up to 12.9 kilometres per hour (8.0 mph)

Pole position
Driver	(Brazil) Nelson Piquet	Brabham-BMW
- Time: 1:25.442

Fastest lap
Driver	(Brazil) Nelson Piquet	Brabham-BMW
- Time: 1:28.763 on lap 55

Podium
First	(Brazil) Nelson Piquet	Brabham-BMW
Second	(Austria) Niki Lauda	McLaren-TAG
Third	(France) Alain Prost	McLaren-TAG

The 1984 Canadian Grand Prix was a Formula One motor race held at Circuit Gilles Villeneuve, Montreal on 17 June 1984. It was the seventh race of the 1984 Formula One World Championship.

The 70-lap race was won by Brazilian Nelson Piquet, driving a Brabham-BMW. Piquet took pole position, led all 70 laps and set the fastest race lap, finishing 2.6 seconds ahead of Austrian Niki Lauda in the McLaren-TAG. Lauda's French teammate, Alain Prost, finished third.

Prost actually won the start from Piquet, but exiting the Epingle de l'ile hairpin halfway around the first lap his TAG turbo went flat under acceleration and the Brabham was past in a flash never to be headed again. The TAG turbo would have intermittent electrical issues for Prost which helped Lauda take 2nd from his teammate before the end.

The top six was completed by Elio de Angelis in the Lotus-Renault, René Arnoux in the Ferrari, and Nigel Mansell in the other Lotus-Renault.

After the race, Piquet climbed out of his car and collapsed on the ground, due to a badly burned right foot caused by the extreme heat from his Brabham's new nose-mounted oil cooler which had actually burned a hole in his driving boot. In the next race at Detroit, he had a special tray of ice for easing the blisters on his foot.

== Classification ==
=== Qualifying ===
Pos	No	Driver	Constructor	Q1	Q2	Gap
1	1	(Brazil) Nelson Piquet	Brabham-BMW	1:27.154	1:25.442	—
2	7	(France) Alain Prost	McLaren-TAG	1:26.477	1:26.198	+0.756
3	11	(Italy) Elio de Angelis	Lotus-Renault	1:27.139	1:26.306	+0.864
4	16	(United Kingdom) Derek Warwick	Renault	1:29.682	1:26.420	+0.978
5	28	(France) René Arnoux	Ferrari	1:27.917	1:26.549	+1.107
6	27	(Italy) Michele Alboreto	Ferrari	1:28.604	1:26.764	+1.322
7	12	(United Kingdom) Nigel Mansell	Lotus-Renault	1:28.277	1:27.246	+1.804
8	8	(Austria) Niki Lauda	McLaren-TAG	1:28.548	1:27.392	+1.950
9	19	(Brazil) Ayrton Senna	Toleman-Hart	1:29.282	1:27.448	+2.006
10	26	(Italy) Andrea de Cesaris	Ligier-Renault	1:29.618	1:27.922	+2.480
11	23	(United States) Eddie Cheever	Alfa Romeo	1:29.418	1:28.032	+2.590
12	14	(West Germany) Manfred Winkelhock	ATS-BMW	1:32.311	1:28.909	+3.467
13	25	(France) François Hesnault	Ligier-Renault	1:31.146	1:29.187	+3.745
14	22	(Italy) Riccardo Patrese	Alfa Romeo	1:29.205	1:30.064	+3.763
15	6	(Finland) Keke Rosberg	Williams-Honda	1:29.423	1:29.284	+3.842
16	2	(Italy) Corrado Fabi	Brabham-BMW	1:30.831	1:29.764	+4.322
17	5	(France) Jacques Laffite	Williams-Honda	1:30.115	1:29.915	+4.473
18	18	(Belgium) Thierry Boutsen	Arrows-BMW	1:30.887	1:30.073	+4.631
19	24	(Italy) Piercarlo Ghinzani	Osella-Alfa Romeo	1:32.189	1:30.918	+5.476
20	20	(Venezuela) Johnny Cecotto	Toleman-Hart	1:34.731	1:31.459	+6.017
21	3	(United Kingdom) Martin Brundle	Tyrrell-Ford	1:33.945	1:31.785	+6.343
22	4	(West Germany) Stefan Bellof	Tyrrell-Ford	1:34.309	1:31.797	+6.355
23	17	(Switzerland) Marc Surer	Arrows-Ford	1:33.014	1:32.756	+7.314
24	21	(Netherlands) Huub Rothengatter	Spirit-Hart	1:35.217	1:32.920	+7.478
25	10	(New Zealand) Mike Thackwell	RAM-Hart	1:34.921	1:33.750	+8.288
26	9	(France) Philippe Alliot	RAM-Hart	1:35.286	1:36.900	+9.844
WD	15	(France) Patrick Tambay	Renault			

=== Race ===
Pos	No	Driver	Constructor	Laps	Time/Retired	Grid	Points
1	1	(Brazil) Nelson Piquet	Brabham-BMW	70	1:46:23.748	1	9
2	8	(Austria) Niki Lauda	McLaren-TAG	70	+ 2.612	8	6
3	7	(France) Alain Prost	McLaren-TAG	70	+ 1:28.032	2	4
4	11	(Italy) Elio de Angelis	Lotus-Renault	69	+ 1 Lap	3	3
5	28	(France) René Arnoux	Ferrari	68	+ 2 Laps	5	2
6	12	(United Kingdom) Nigel Mansell	Lotus-Renault	68	+ 2 Laps	7	1
7	19	(Brazil) Ayrton Senna	Toleman-Hart	68	+ 2 Laps	9	
8	14	(West Germany) Manfred Winkelhock	ATS-BMW	68	+ 2 Laps	12	
9	20	(Venezuela) Johnny Cecotto	Toleman-Hart	68	+ 2 Laps	20	
10	9	(France) Philippe Alliot	RAM-Hart	65	+ 5 Laps	26	
11	23	(United States) Eddie Cheever	Alfa Romeo	63	Out of Fuel	11	
DSQ	3	(United Kingdom) Martin Brundle	Tyrrell-Ford	68	Disqualified	21	
Ret	17	(Switzerland) Marc Surer	Arrows-Ford	59	Engine	23	
Ret	16	(United Kingdom) Derek Warwick	Renault	57	Chassis	4	
NC	21	(Netherlands) Huub Rothengatter	Spirit-Hart	56	+ 14 Laps	24	
DSQ	4	(West Germany) Stefan Bellof	Tyrrell-Ford	52	Disqualified	22	
Ret	26	(Italy) Andrea de Cesaris	Ligier-Renault	40	Brakes	10	
Ret	2	(Italy) Corrado Fabi	Brabham-BMW	39	Turbo	16	
Ret	18	(Belgium) Thierry Boutsen	Arrows-BMW	38	Engine	18	
Ret	22	(Italy) Riccardo Patrese	Alfa Romeo	37	Accident	14	
Ret	6	(Finland) Keke Rosberg	Williams-Honda	32	Fuel System	15	
Ret	5	(France) Jacques Laffite	Williams-Honda	31	Turbo	17	
Ret	10	(New Zealand) Mike Thackwell	RAM-Hart	29	Turbo	25	
Ret	24	(Italy) Piercarlo Ghinzani	Osella-Alfa Romeo	11	Gearbox	19	
Ret	27	(Italy) Michele Alboreto	Ferrari	10	Engine	6	
Ret	25	(France) François Hesnault	Ligier-Renault	7	Turbo	13	
WD	15	(France) Patrick Tambay	Renault		Driver Injured		

== Championship standings after the race ==
Drivers' Championship standings

Pos	Driver	Points
1	(France) Alain Prost	32.5
2	(Austria) Niki Lauda	24
3	(France) René Arnoux	16.5
4	(Italy) Elio de Angelis	15.5
5	(United Kingdom) Derek Warwick	13

Constructors' Championship standings

Pos	Constructor	Points
1	(United Kingdom) McLaren-TAG	56.5
2	(Italy) Ferrari	25.5
3	(United Kingdom) Lotus-Renault	20.5
4	(France) Renault	20
5	(United Kingdom) Williams-Honda	11

- Note: Only the top five positions are included for both sets of standings. Points accurate at final declaration of results. Tyrrell and its drivers were subsequently disqualified and their points reallocated.

Previous race: 1984 Monaco Grand Prix	FIA Formula One World Championship; 1984 season	Next race: 1984 Detroit Grand Prix
Previous race: 1983 Canadian Grand Prix	Canadian Grand Prix	Next race: 1985 Canadian Grand Prix
