= Paul Rosche =

German engineer (1934–2016)

- Born: 1 April 1934; Munich, German Reich
- Died: 15 November 2016 (aged 82); Munich, Germany
- Occupations: Engineer; Technical director
- Years active: 1957–1999
- Employer: BMW
- Known for: Design and development of BMW engines.
- Notable work: BMW M31, M12, S14, M88 and S70/2 engines.

Paul Rosche (1 April 1934 – 15 November 2016) was a German engineer known for his work while at BMW. He is notable for designing the engines of a number of BMW's high-performance models including the M31 found in the BMW 2002 Turbo, the S14 for the E30 M3, the M12 for the 320i Turbo and the Brabham BT52, the M88 in the M1, and the S70/2 in the V12 LMR and the McLaren F1.

Rosche joined BMW after going to college and became very skilled at calculating camshafts. He soon became a specialist with camshafts, earning the nickname "Nocken-Paul" (Camshaft Paul). He later became a technical director of the BMW M racing program.

Throughout Rosche's career, engines which he personally designed or under his stewardship have achieved a total of 150 European Formula Two Championship and Formula One World Championship wins, as well as two victories in the 24 Hours of Le Mans.

== Biography ==
Paul Rosche joined BMW immediately after he graduated from college in November 1957 at 23. He started working in the six-person research and development team, under the supervision of Alexander von Falkenhausen, who quickly promoted Rosche after realizing that he was extremely talented. The first project Rosche worked on was the camshaft of the BMW 502 and 507. As a result of his high level of skill in calculating camshafts, Rosche quickly began to specialize in this task and was given the nickname "Nocken-Paul" (Camshaft Paul). One of Rosche's first significant projects was the design of the 80 BHP four-cylinder M10 for the 1500. The development later became the 1800TI/SA, with its twin Solex carburettors, generating 130 BHP.

In the mid-1960s, Rosche specialized in motorsports after von Falkenhausen encouraged the management of BMW to use the M10 for motorsports. Rosche designed the 2002TIK, a turbocharged engine which won the 1969 European Touring Car Championship; it was later developed into the 2002 Turbo. BMW's racing program was halted in 1970 by its sales and marketing director, Paul G. Hahnemann, after his position came under threat from the company's board. Some believed it was a result of Gerhard Mitter's fatal accident at the Nürburgring in the previous year, as well as budget cuts. Rosche and von Falkenhausen led the development group discreetly until BMW was encouraged to make a comeback in the business of racing in 1972. Shortly afterwards, they collaborated with the Formula Two project organized by March Engineering's factory team. Here, Rosche played a very significant role, leading to a string of successes in the European Championship as well as in touring car racing. In 1973, he became the head of the main advanced development and racing engine development division. After Von Falkenhausen's retirement in 1975, Rosche became the technical head of BMW M Motorsport, overseeing the development and production of racing engines for the M1. He later became technical director and held the post from 1978 until 1996.

With the help of Jochen Neerpasch, Rosche tried to encourage BMW to enter Formula One using the M12 turbocharged engine, which was based on the M10 engine. When this bid failed, Neerpasch resigned and was replaced by Dieter Stappert, who persuaded the board to attempt the project again in 1980. The engine was tested at the end of the year and made its debut in 1982, winning its first race soon after with Nelson Piquet at the Canadian Grand Prix. The engine achieved another eight wins in F1 and Piquet won his second World Championship title in 1983 with it. The BMW engine later produced the biggest power output in F1 history (a peak speculated at 1500 bhp and confirmed at 1300bhp).

BMW withdrew from F1 at the end of 1986 and sold their engines to Megatron. Rosche built prototype engines thereafter, but the company refused to return to F1. About the same time, he also developed the S14 for the E30 M3, which became the most successful car in Group A racing. Gordon Murray, who had previously worked with Rosche during their time at Brabham in the early 1980s, met Rosche after the 1990 German Grand Prix. When Murray's plans to develop an engine with Honda fell through, he turned to BMW Motorsport for their services leading to Rosche being tasked with the development of an engine for the McLaren F1. The goal originally demanded by Murray was a 4.5-litre V10 or V12 producing 550 bhp, with a maximum 600mm block length and 250 kg, including all the ancillaries, the exhaust, and silencer.

The development of the engine started with a completely new design, taking a few components from the M70; the eventual result was the S70/2. This engine exceeded its goal at 627 bhp, however, it exceeded the maximum weight by 16 kg. In the version used for racing, the F1 GTR, the engine won the 1995 24 Hours of Le Mans; later, it also won that title in 1999 with the V12 LMR.

Rosche's final project before retiring at the age of 65 was the E41 for the Williams FW22. Werner Laurenz took over the position of technical director at BMW Motorsport after Rosche's retirement. Even though he had retired, Rosche was one of the team of 30 mechanics who helped to restore the Brabham BT52 which had won the 1983 Formula One season in preparation for the Goodwood Festival of Speed in 2013. Rosche died on 15 November 2016.
