= 1984 Detroit Grand Prix =

- Race 8 of 16 in the 1984 Formula One World Championship

Race details
- Date: June 24, 1984
- Official name: 3rd Detroit Grand Prix
- Location: Detroit Street Circuit, Detroit, Michigan
- Course: Temporary street course
- Course length: 4.120 km (2.56 miles)
- Distance: 63 laps, 259.56 km (161.28 miles)
- Weather: Sunny and warm with temperatures reaching up to 77.9 °F (25.5 °C); wind speeds up to 11.3 miles per hour (18.2 km/h)

Pole position
Driver	(Brazil) Nelson Piquet	Brabham-BMW
- Time: 1:40.980

Fastest lap
Driver	(United Kingdom) Derek Warwick	Renault
- Time: 1:46.221 on lap 32

Podium
First	(Brazil) Nelson Piquet	Brabham-BMW
Second	(Italy) Elio de Angelis	Lotus-Renault
Third	(Italy) Teo Fabi	Brabham-BMW

The 1984 Detroit Grand Prix was a Formula One motor race held on June 24, 1984 in Detroit, Michigan. It was the eighth race of the 1984 Formula One World Championship.

The 63-lap race was won from pole position by Brazilian driver Nelson Piquet, driving a Brabham-BMW. Englishman Martin Brundle finished second in a Tyrrell-Ford, less than a second behind Piquet, before the Tyrrell team were disqualified from the championship for various alleged rule infringements. Italian Elio de Angelis was thus promoted to second in his Lotus-Renault with another Italian, Teo Fabi, third in the other Brabham-BMW.

== Pre-race ==
After breaking his leg at the Monaco Grand Prix three weeks before, and subsequently withdrawing from the next race in Canada, Patrick Tambay was back driving for the works Renault team. Mario Andretti, who had been called in as a possible replacement for Tambay in the race, was satisfied to spend the weekend as a spectator, watching his two sons run in the support races. Elsewhere, a lack of Hart turbo engines meant that the Spirit team were forced to modify their car to accommodate a naturally-aspirated Ford Cosworth DFV for this race.

== Qualifying report ==
Qualifying saw Nelson Piquet take pole position in his Brabham-BMW, his second in succession and fourth of the season, by over 0.6 seconds from Alain Prost's McLaren-TAG. Nigel Mansell, having set the fastest time in the Friday session in his Lotus-Renault, was third, a further 0.5 seconds behind, with Michele Alboreto fourth in the Ferrari. On the third row of the grid were Mansell's teammate Elio de Angelis and Derek Warwick in the factory Renault, and on the fourth row were Ayrton Senna's Toleman-Hart and Eddie Cheever's Alfa Romeo. Completing the top ten were the second factory Renault of Patrick Tambay and the second McLaren-TAG of Niki Lauda. Piquet's teammate Teo Fabi could only manage 23rd, while Huub Rothengatter came 27th and last in the Spirit-Ford and thus failed to qualify.

=== Qualifying classification ===
Pos	No	Driver	Constructor	Q1	Q2	Gap
1	1	(Brazil) Nelson Piquet	Brabham-BMW	1:45.407	1:40.980	
2	7	(France) Alain Prost	McLaren-TAG	1:45.717	1:41.640	+0.660
3	12	(United Kingdom) Nigel Mansell	Lotus-Renault	1:45.130	1:42.172	+1.192
4	27	(Italy) Michele Alboreto	Ferrari	1:47.719	1:42.246	+1.266
5	11	(Italy) Elio de Angelis	Lotus-Renault	1:47.316	1:42.434	+1.454
6	16	(United Kingdom) Derek Warwick	Renault	1:47.341	1:42.637	+1.657
7	19	(Brazil) Ayrton Senna	Toleman-Hart	1:47.188	1:42.651	+1.671
8	23	(United States) Eddie Cheever	Alfa Romeo	1:47.347	1:43.065	+2.085
9	15	(France) Patrick Tambay	Renault	1:46.426	1:43.289	+2.309
10	8	(Austria) Niki Lauda	McLaren-TAG	no time	1:43.484	+2.480
11	3	(United Kingdom) Martin Brundle	Tyrrell-Ford	1:48.966	1:43.754	+2.774
12	26	(Italy) Andrea de Cesaris	Ligier-Renault	1:46.834	1:43.998	+3.018
13	18	(Belgium) Thierry Boutsen	Arrows-BMW	1:47.866	1:44.063	+3.083
14	14	(West Germany) Manfred Winkelhock	ATS-BMW	1:47.303	1:44.228	+3.248
15	28	(France) René Arnoux	Ferrari	1:46.805	1:44.748	+3.768
16	4	(West Germany) Stefan Bellof	Tyrrell-Ford	1:48.177	1:44.940	+3.960
17	20	(Venezuela) Johnny Cecotto	Toleman-Hart	1:49.644	1:45.231	+4.251
18	25	(France) François Hesnault	Ligier-Renault	1:49.597	1:45.419	+4.439
19	5	(France) Jacques Laffite	Williams-Honda	1:47.610	1:46.225	+5.245
20	9	(France) Philippe Alliot	RAM-Hart	1:51.031	1:46.333	+5.353
21	6	(Finland) Keke Rosberg	Williams-Honda	1:47.919	1:46.495	+5.515
22	17	(Switzerland) Marc Surer	Arrows-Ford	6:22.502	1:46.626	+5.646
23	2	(Italy) Teo Fabi	Brabham-BMW	1:51.165	1:47.335	+6.355
24	10	(United Kingdom) Jonathan Palmer	RAM-Hart	1:51.493	1:47.743	+6.673
25	22	(Italy) Riccardo Patrese	Alfa Romeo	1:47.974	1:48.230	+6.994
26	24	(Italy) Piercarlo Ghinzani	Osella-Alfa Romeo	1:49.141	1:48.865	+7.885
DNQ	21	(Netherlands) Huub Rothengatter	Spirit-Ford	1:53.625	1:49.995	+8.975

== Race report ==
Warm and sunny weather returned on Sunday after an overnight storm had washed the track clean, but at the green light, there was immediate chaos. Nigel Mansell had decided that he could get by Nelson Piquet off the grid and aimed his Lotus for the space between Piquet's Brabham and Alain Prost's McLaren. He struck the back of Prost and bounced into the side of Piquet, sending the Brabham sliding to the outside wall of the track and into Michele Alboreto's Ferrari. The Brabham's right rear wheel was launched into the air and landed on the front of Ayrton Senna's Toleman, breaking the suspension. At the same time, Marc Surer suddenly found his charge from the back of the grid blocked by Piquet's stricken car, and drove his Arrows into the Brabham's left front wheel. Taking no chances, the organizers stopped the race and made preparations for a restart.

Piquet, Alboreto and Senna took to their spare cars, but the Arrows team had none to offer Surer, so the Swiss driver was absent when the field reassembled on the grid. The second start came off without a hitch, as Piquet led from Prost and Mansell. At the end of the first lap, these three were followed by Alboreto, Eddie Cheever who had already gained three places, Derek Warwick, Elio de Angelis, Niki Lauda, Patrick Tambay and Ayrton Senna. Prost followed closely behind Piquet for the first few laps, then dropped back when his rear tires began to lose grip. As a result, Mansell closed up on the Frenchman and overtook him on lap 10, with Piquet five seconds ahead.

Immediately, Mansell fought hard to catch the leading Brabham, taking over a second per lap off his lead. Piquet, it seemed, was driving just fast enough to stay in front, however, and Mansell was unable to get within striking distance. On lap 17, the Lotus slowed noticeably while entering the Atwater Tunnel, as he had lost second gear. Meanwhile, not only Prost, but the Renaults of Warwick and Tambay, and then Lauda were forced to stop for new tires, while Piquet was having no trouble at all with the abrasive surface. Within moments of each other on lap 22, Senna's right rear wheel came off in 5th gear on the main straight and he spun into the tire barrier in Turn one while under pressure from Keke Rosberg, and Cheever retired from third place with a cracked inter-cooler. Mansell finally gave up the struggle with his disintegrating gearbox on lap 28, handing second place to Alboreto, 15 seconds behind Piquet. Elio de Angelis was a close third in the second Lotus, then a long gap back to Rosberg and the stunning Tyrrell rookies, Martin Brundle and Stefan Bellof.

The Tyrrell team, which continued to use the naturally aspirated Cosworth-Ford V8 engine, was generally not expected to be competitive against turbocharged rivals during the season. However, the team had already scored points in four of the first seven races. On tighter circuits, their lower weight and reduced power contributed to improved tire wear. At Detroit, this enabled them to use a softer Goodyear tire compound, while most competitors opted for a harder compound. The cars’ relatively compact design also provided an advantage on the narrow street circuit, particularly through the chicane leading onto the pit straight. Additionally, drivers Martin Brundle and Stefan Bellof delivered strong performances in their debut season. As the race developed and conditions became more challenging around mid-distance, Brundle played a key role in sustaining the team’s competitiveness.

Bellof, however, suddenly ground to a halt on lap 34 when he struck the wall exiting the chicane before the pits. Then, just as Brundle was pitting for water ballast, Warwick set the fastest lap of the race and passed Rosberg and de Angelis on consecutive laps to take third place. About to set off after Alboreto, Warwick's Renault suddenly lost fifth gear, allowing de Angelis and Rosberg to repass him on lap 37. His gearbox completely expired on lap 41, and he became the eighteenth retirement of the day, leaving only eight cars still running. Rosberg succumbed next with a broken turbocharger, and when Alboreto blew his engine on lap 50, Piquet led by more than 30 seconds.

Brundle now found himself in third place and gaining on de Angelis, who was driving without second gear in his Lotus as teammate Mansell had done before retiring. By lap 56, Brundle had erased the ten seconds between him and the Lotus, and he passed by as they approached the chicane to take second place. With seven laps to go, Piquet was 20 seconds ahead and winding down his boost as he allowed Prost to unlap himself. Brundle continued to charge, however, taking almost five seconds per lap off the Champion's lead. Even as Brundle pulled within a second on their last entrance to the Tunnel, Piquet remained cool and took his second victory in eight days by just a few car lengths. The only remaining finishers were de Angelis, thirty seconds back; the second Brabham of Teo Fabi (scoring his first points); Prost and the Williams of Jacques Laffite.

Soon after the podium ceremony, word arrived that the officials had found impurities in the water injection system on Brundle's Tyrrell and lead balls in the rubber bag containing the water. Samples of the water were shipped to France and Texas for analysis and were found to contain significant levels of hydrocarbons, though this finding was later overturned on retesting. Ken Tyrrell was called to a meeting of the FISA Executive Committee on July 18 and, based on the impurities in the water, which had been topped up during a pit stop, was accused of refueling the car during the race. (Refueling had been banned prior to the 1984 season and remained illegal until 1994.) The team was banned from the remainder of the World Championship and lost the 13 points they had already gained, though they continued to race, unable to score points. That was weeks later, however, and the organizers in Detroit were grateful for the stirring drive by the English rookie that was the highlight of their event. With his disqualification, however, only 5 drivers were given points, so it wasn't a sixth classified as Alboreto, the last retiree, didn't complete the 90% of the race distance.

=== Race classification ===
Pos	No	Driver	Constructor	Laps	Time/Retired	Grid	Points
1	1	(Brazil) Nelson Piquet	Brabham-BMW	63	1:55:41.842	1	9
2	11	(Italy) Elio de Angelis	Lotus-Renault	63	+ 32.638	5	6
3	2	(Italy) Teo Fabi	Brabham-BMW	63	+ 1:26.528	23	4
4	7	(France) Alain Prost	McLaren-TAG	63	+ 1:55.258	2	3
5	5	(France) Jacques Laffite	Williams-Honda	62	+ 1 Lap	19	2
DSQ	3	(United Kingdom) Martin Brundle	Tyrrell-Ford	63	Underweight car	11	
Ret	27	(Italy) Michele Alboreto	Ferrari	49	Engine	4	
Ret	6	(Finland) Keke Rosberg	Williams-Honda	47	Turbo	21	
Ret	16	(United Kingdom) Derek Warwick	Renault	40	Gearbox	6	
DSQ	4	(West Germany) Stefan Bellof	Tyrrell-Ford	33	Illegal fuel and ballast	16	
Ret	15	(France) Patrick Tambay	Renault	33	Transmission	9	
Ret	9	(France) Philippe Alliot	RAM-Hart	33	Brakes	20	
Ret	8	(Austria) Niki Lauda	McLaren-TAG	33	Electrical	10	
Ret	12	(United Kingdom) Nigel Mansell	Lotus-Renault	27	Gearbox	3	
Ret	18	(Belgium) Thierry Boutsen	Arrows-BMW	27	Engine	13	
Ret	26	(Italy) Andrea de Cesaris	Ligier-Renault	24	Overheating	12	
Ret	20	(Venezuela) Johnny Cecotto	Toleman-Hart	23	Clutch	17	
Ret	23	(United States) Eddie Cheever	Alfa Romeo	21	Engine	8	
Ret	19	(Brazil) Ayrton Senna	Toleman-Hart	21	Accident	7	
Ret	22	(Italy) Riccardo Patrese	Alfa Romeo	20	Spun off	25	
Ret	25	(France) François Hesnault	Ligier-Renault	3	Accident	18	
Ret	24	(Italy) Piercarlo Ghinzani	Osella-Alfa Romeo	3	Accident	26	
Ret	28	(France) René Arnoux	Ferrari	2	Accident	15	
Ret	10	(United Kingdom) Jonathan Palmer	RAM-Hart	2	Tyre	24	
Ret	14	(West Germany) Manfred Winkelhock	ATS-BMW	0	Engine	14	
Ret	17	(Switzerland) Marc Surer	Arrows-Ford	0	Accident	22	

== Championship standings after the race ==
Drivers' Championship standings

Pos	Driver	Points
1	(France) Alain Prost	34.5
2	(Austria) Niki Lauda	24
3	(Italy) Elio de Angelis	19.5
4	(Brazil) Nelson Piquet	18
5	(France) René Arnoux	16.5

Constructors' Championship standings

Pos	Constructor	Points
1	(United Kingdom) McLaren-TAG	58.5
2	(Italy) Ferrari	25.5
3	(United Kingdom) Lotus-Renault	24.5
4	(United Kingdom) Brabham-BMW	21
5	(France) Renault	20

- Note: Only the top five positions are included for both sets of standings. Points accurate at final declaration of results. Tyrrell and its drivers were subsequently disqualified and their points reallocated.

Previous race: 1984 Canadian Grand Prix	FIA Formula One World Championship; 1984 season	Next race: 1984 Dallas Grand Prix
Previous race: 1983 Detroit Grand Prix	Detroit Grand Prix	Next race: 1985 Detroit Grand Prix
Awards
Preceded by 1983 Italian Grand Prix	Formula One Promotional Trophy for Race Promoter; 1984	Succeeded by 1985 Australian Grand Prix
