= Ligier JS17 =

Ligier JS17 Ligier JS17B
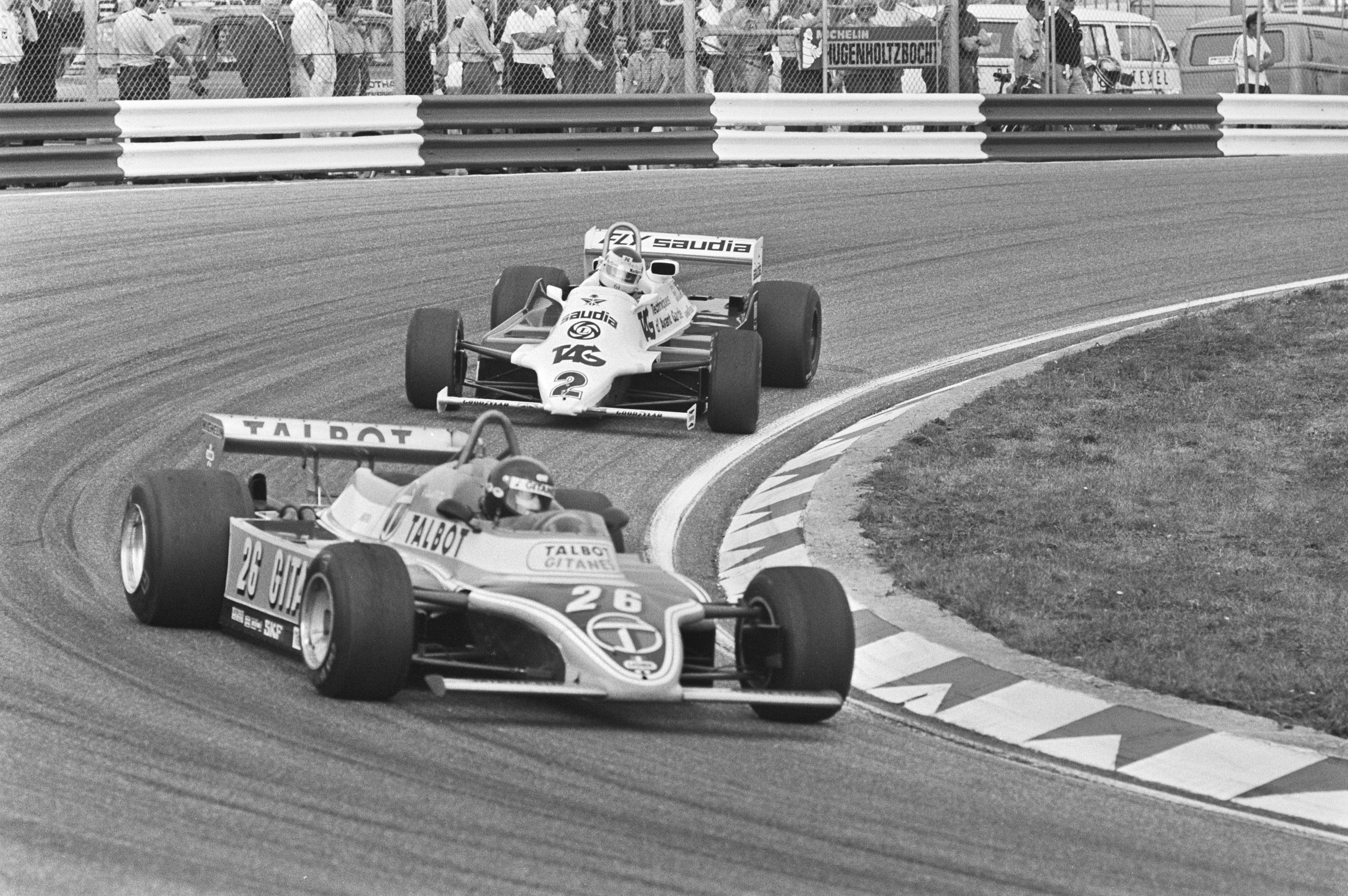
- Jacques Laffite in the JS17 leading Carlos Reutemann at the 1981 Dutch Grand Prix
- Category: Formula One
- Constructor: Ligier
- Designers: Gérard Ducarouge (Technical Director); Michel Beaujon (Chief Designer)
- Predecessor: JS11/15
- Successor: JS19

Technical specifications
- Chassis: Aluminium monocoque
- Axle track: Front: 1,710 mm (67 in); Rear: 1,678 mm (66.1 in)
- Wheelbase: 2,780 mm (109 in)
- Engine: Matra MS81, 2,993 cc (182.6 cu in), 60° V12, NA, mid-engine, longitudinally mounted
- Transmission: Hewland FGB 400, 5-speed manual
- Weight: 580 kg (1,280 lb)
- Fuel: Elf
- Tyres: Michelin

Competition history
- Notable entrants: Equipe Talbot Gitanes
- Notable drivers: (France) Jacques Laffite (France) Jean-Pierre Jabouille (France) Patrick Tambay (United States) Eddie Cheever
- Debut: 1981 United States Grand Prix West
- First win: 1981 Austrian Grand Prix
- Last win: 1981 Canadian Grand Prix
- Last event: 1982 British Grand Prix
Races	Wins	Poles	F/Laps
23	2	1	1
- Constructors' Championships: 0
- Drivers' Championships: 0

The Ligier JS17 was a Formula One car designed by Gérard Ducarouge and Michel Beaujon for use by the Ligier team during the 1981 season. Powered by a Talbot-badged Matra V12, the JS17 was driven to two Grand Prix wins by Jacques Laffite. It was updated to JS17B specification for the 1982 season until it was replaced later that year by the JS19.

== Design and development ==
The JS17 was designed by Gérard Ducarouge and Michel Beaujon and initially carried conventional suspension. Later on in the season, the team adopted a hydro-pneumatic system to lower the car on track but this did not work effectively until the Belgium race. After two years of using the Cosworth DFV, for the 1981 season, team owner Guy Ligier had arranged a supply of Talbot-badged Matra V12 engines. The V12 engine, designated the MS81 and newly developed by Georges Martin, initially generated an average of 510 bhp at 12,500 rpm. This was gradually improved by Martin, and by the end of the year the MS81 was revving at 13,000 rpm. A total of six JS17s were built throughout the year, the last of these being introduced at the Italian Grand Prix.

The JS17 continued service into 1982 as an updated JS17B. Matra had hoped to introduce a turbocharged V6 but this never eventuated and the team continued with the MS81. All four of the surviving chassis from the previous year were rebuilt and stiffened. The JS17B was one of the heavier cars on the grid for 1982.

== Racing history ==
=== 1981 season ===
Regular Ligier driver Jacques Laffite was joined by Jean-Pierre Jabouille, a race winner for Renault, for 1981. However, the latter had not yet recovered from injuries sustained in a crash the previous year and so Jean-Pierre Jarier was contracted for the first race of the year in the United States. Both drivers qualified in mid-field, Jarier ahead of Laffite, but failed to finish the race itself. Jabouille tried to drive at the following race in Brazil but was still unfit and Jarier had to stand in again. He finished seventh behind Laffite, who scored the car's first points finish with sixth place.

Jabouille had recovered for the third race of the year in Argentina but failed to qualify. Laffite in the meantime qualified comfortably for the race but retired with handling problems. He also retired from the following race while Jabouille finally got to race the JS17 in anger, after qualifying in 18th. Although his car was running at the finish, he was several laps down and thus unclassified. By the Belgian Grand Prix, the team had gotten its hydropneumatic suspension working properly and this saw an improved performance with Jabouille making the grid in 16th while Laffite was ninth. While Jabouille retired from the race, Laffite finished second. He followed this up with third in Monaco and another second, from pole position, at the Spanish Grand Prix.

In contrast, Jabouille failed to qualify for the Monaco race and, after making 19th on the grid in Spain, retired with brake problems. Recognising his racing performance was compromised, Jabouille stepped down from driving duties for the team after the Spanish Grand Prix and was now providing technical direction. To take over the vacant seat, Patrick Tambay was brought in from the Theodore Racing team. Although he performed better in qualifying than Jabouille, regularly qualifying in midfield with a best of seventh at Las Vegas, he was unable to provide any contribution to the team's points tally, retiring from all his races.

In the meantime, Laffite, finished third in successive races in Britain and Germany. Thanks to the assistance of Jabouille in tyre selection, Laffite won in Austria from fourth on the grid, taking fastest lap along the way. He retired from the next two races but was atop of the podium again in Canada, placing him in contention for the Driver's Championship with just one race to go. At the season finale, in Las Vegas, he qualified 12th but had worked his way into second place during the race when he had to make a pitstop for tyres and ultimately finished sixth.

Laffite's performance during the year saw him finish in fourth in the Driver's Championship with 44 points. With none of his teammates able to contribute any points finishes for the team, Ligier also placed fourth in the Constructor's Championship.

=== 1982 season ===
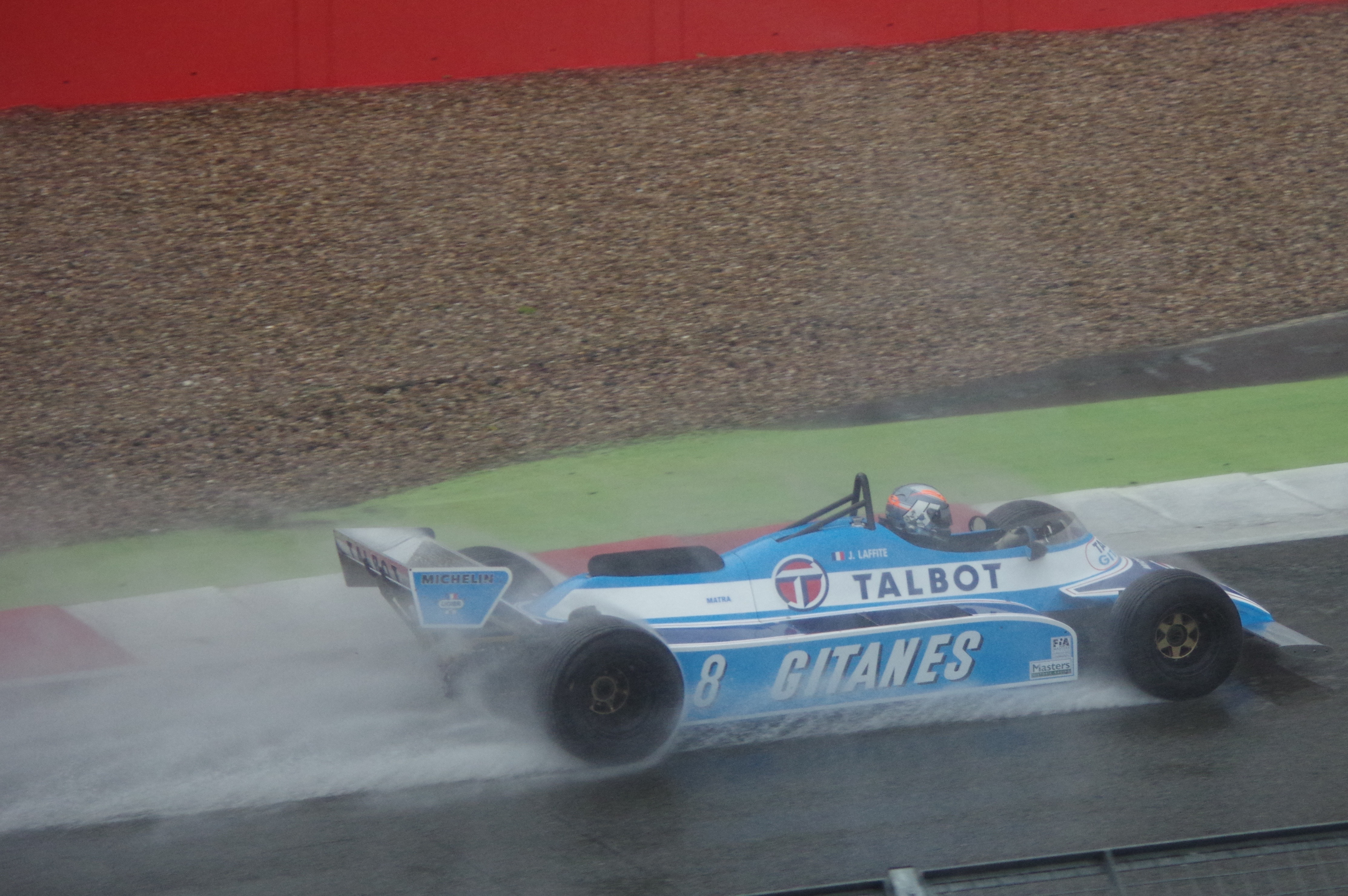
A JS17 being driven in the rain at Silverstone in 2015.

The American Eddie Cheever joined Laffite in the team for 1982. Racing updated JS17Bs, neither driver finished the first three races of the season. After boycotting the San Marino Grand Prix, Cheever finished third at Zolder with Laffite in ninth place.

The team introduced its new car, the JS19, at the following race at Monaco but it performed poorly. The team reverted to the JS17B for the next few races while the JS19 was developed further. Cheever placed second at Detroit from ninth on the grid while Laffite qualified 13th and finished sixth. Both drivers retired from the next race in Canada, the last occasion at which both drivers used the JS17B. Cheever switched to the JS19 for the Dutch race, leaving Laffite with the old car; he qualified in 21st and retired from the race with handling problems. Laffite took over the JS19 and Cheever reverted to the JS17B for its final race in Britain. Here he qualified in 24th place but was unsuccessful in the race, retiring with an oil leak.

Ligier finished eighth in the 1982 Constructors with 20 points; Cheever's two podium finishes and Laffite's sixth place with the JS17B contributing 11 points to the team's total.

== Complete Formula One World Championship results ==
(key) (Results in bold indicate pole position; results in italics indicate fastest lap)

Year	Entrant	Chassis	Engine	Tyres	Drivers	1	2	3	4	5	6	7	8	9	10	11	12	13	14	15	16	Points	WCC
1981	Equipe Talbot Gitanes	JS17	Matra V12	MI		USW	BRA	ARG	SMR	BEL	MON	ESP	FRA	GBR	GER	AUT	NED	ITA	CAN	CPL		**44**	4th
1981	Equipe Talbot Gitanes	JS17	Matra V12	MI	Jean-Pierre Jarier	Ret	7															**44**	4th
1981	Equipe Talbot Gitanes	JS17	Matra V12	MI	Jean-Pierre Jabouille		DNA	DNQ	NC	Ret	DNQ	Ret										**44**	4th
1981	Equipe Talbot Gitanes	JS17	Matra V12	MI	Patrick Tambay								Ret	Ret	Ret	Ret	Ret	Ret	Ret	Ret		**44**	4th
1981	Equipe Talbot Gitanes	JS17	Matra V12	MI	Jacques Laffite	Ret	6	Ret	Ret	2	3	**2**	Ret	3	3	1	Ret	Ret	1	6		**44**	4th
1982	Equipe Talbot Gitanes	JS17B	Matra V12	MI		RSA	BRA	USW	SMR	BEL	MON	DET	CAN	NED	GBR	FRA	GER	AUT	SUI	ITA	CPL	**20***	8th
1982	Equipe Talbot Gitanes	JS17B	Matra V12	MI	Eddie Cheever	Ret	Ret	Ret		3		2	Ret		Ret							**20***	8th
1982	Equipe Talbot Gitanes	JS17B	Matra V12	MI	Jacques Laffite	Ret	Ret	Ret		9		6	Ret	Ret								**20***	8th

* 11 points scored with the JS19
