= Jacques Villeneuve (racing driver, born 1953) =

Canadian racing driver (born 1953)

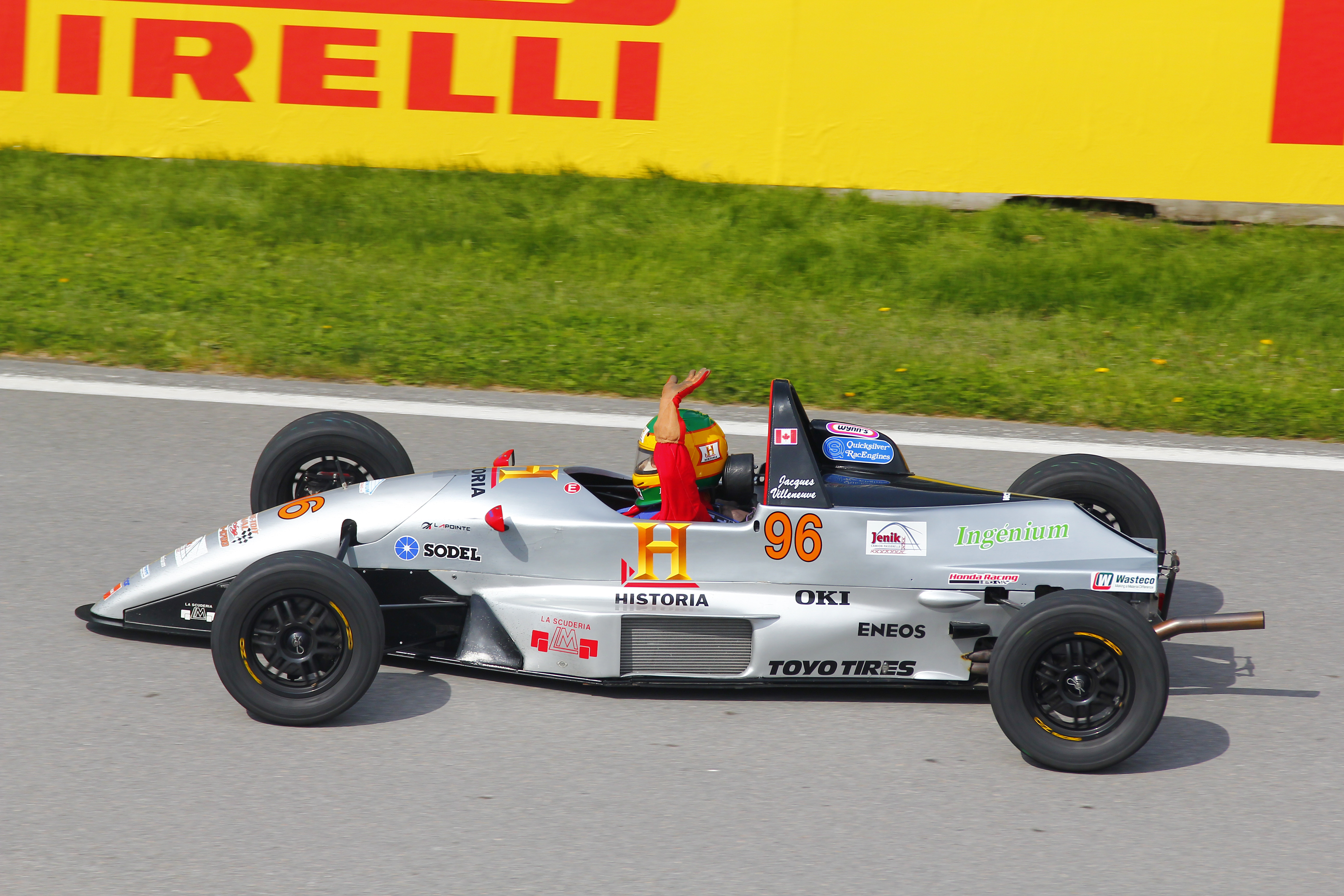
- Villeneuve taking part in a Formula 1600 race supporting the 2015 Canadian Grand Prix
- Born: Jacques-Joseph Villeneuve; 4 November 1953 (age 73); Berthierville, Quebec, Canada
- Relatives: Gilles Villeneuve (brother); Jacques Villeneuve (nephew)

Championship titles
- SCCA/CASC Formula Atlantic (1980–1981); SCCA/CASC Can-Am (1983)

Champ Car career
- 36 races run over 5 years
- Best finish: 8th (1985)
- First race: 1982 Miller High Life 150 (Phoenix)
- Last race: 1992 Texaco/Havoline 200 (Road America)
- First win: 1985 Provimi Veal 200 (Road America)
- Last win: 1985 Provimi Veal 200 (Road America)
Wins	Podiums	Poles
1	2	1

Formula One World Championship career
- Active years: 1981, 1983
- Team(s): Arrows, RAM
- Entries: 3 (0 starts)
- Championships: 0
- Wins: 0
- Podiums: 0
- Career points: 0
- Pole positions: 0
- Fastest laps: 0
- First entry: 1981 Canadian Grand Prix
- Last entry: 1983 Canadian Grand Prix
- 1983 position: NC (0 points)

24 Hours of Le Mans career
- Years: 1983
- Teams: Brun Motorsport
- Best finish: DNF (1983)
- Class wins: 0

Jacques-Joseph Villeneuve (born November 4, 1953) is a Canadian racing driver. He is the younger brother of the late Gilles Villeneuve, and uncle to Jacques Villeneuve, the 1997 Formula One World Champion. He is sometimes called "Uncle Jacques" (L'oncle Jacques in French) to differentiate him from his nephew, and is also known by the nickname "Jacquo". Villeneuve had a varied motorsport career, taking in Formula Atlantic, CART, Can-Am, snowmobile racing and Formula One, and remains a revered figure in Canadian motorsport circles. Villeneuve was the first three-time winner of the World Championship Snowmobile Derby.

== Career ==
Villeneuve started out racing snowmobiles and he has continued to race in snowmobile events throughout his career. He moved into saloon racing in Canada, winning a Honda Civic series and many races from 1976 to 1978. He then stepped up to the open-wheeler Formula Ford category, and then Formula Atlantic, where he took Rookie of the Year in 1979, then consecutive titles in 1980 and 1981. He also won the World Championship Snowmobile Derby in 1980. At the end of 1981, he took a pair of drives for the Arrows Formula One team, but failed to qualify for the Canadian Grand Prix, or the Caesars Palace Grand Prix.

In 1979, Villeneuve competed in the Cannonball Baker Sea-to-Shining-Sea Memorial Trophy Dash in a Porsche 928 co-piloted by John Lane (Gilles Villeneuve's sponsor and friend).

1982 started out with Villeneuve winning the World Championship Snowmobile Derby. The track was exceptionally hard caused by bitter cold, and his team set up his sled for the conditions. He took home $11,300 for his win, with cash and prizes totaling over $50,000. The rest of 1982 was difficult, after his brother Gilles died in May. Jacques spent most of the year in Can-Am, though he would take a one-off drive in CART. 1983 saw him take the Can-Am title, as well as another Formula One drive (narrowly failing to qualify a RAM for the 1983 Canadian Grand Prix). During this period, he also kept up his snowmobiling exploits, winning a number of prestigious races, and had a one-off Sportscar drive at the 1983 24 Hours of Le Mans.

1984 saw a return to CART, with Villeneuve ranking 15th overall, having taken pole position at the Phoenix round. The following year, he became the first Canadian to win a CART race, taking victory in the wet/dry race at Road America on his way to eighth overall in the standings. He became the only person to win a third World Championship Snowmobile Derby in 1986. After spending the season of CART and his only appearance in the Indianapolis 500, Villeneuve scaled back his motor racing activities, though he has regularly returned for occasional drives to CART, Formula Atlantic (winning some of these guest races) and IMSA.

Villeneuve also remained highly active and successful in snowmobiling, also, branching out to powerboat racing. On January 18, 2008, Villeneuve was seriously injured in an accident during the World Championship Snowmobile race. He suffered multiple leg and pelvic fractures as a result, in addition to a spinal injury. It was estimated that it would take Villeneuve seven to nine months to recover from his injuries. On February 16, 2013, having recovered and returned to racing, Villeneuve suffered another serious accident whilst competing in Valcourt, sustaining a leg injury. He left hospital ten days later.

"Uncle" Jacques Villeneuve was inducted into the Canadian Motorsport Hall of Fame in 2001.

== Racing record ==
=== Complete Formula One results ===
(key)

Year	Entrant	Chassis	Engine	1	2	3	4	5	6	7	8	9	10	11	12	13	14	15	WDC	Points
1981	Arrows Racing Team	Arrows A3	Cosworth V8	USW	BRA	ARG	SMR	BEL	MON	ESP	FRA	GBR	GER	AUT	NED	ITA	CAN; DNQ	CPL; DNQ	NC	0
1983	RAM Automotive Team March	RAM March 01	Cosworth V8	BRA	USW	FRA	SMR	MON	BEL	DET	CAN; DNQ	GBR	GER	AUT	NED	ITA	EUR	RSA	NC	0

=== American open–wheel racing results ===
(key)

==== CART ====
Year	Team	No.	1	2	3	4	5	6	7	8	9	10	11	12	13	14	15	16	17	Rank	Points	Ref
1982	Jamieson Racing	47	PHX1	ATL	MIL	CLE	MIS1	MIL	POC	RIV	ROA	MIS2	PHX2; 14							45th	1	
1984	Canadian Tire Racing	76	LBH; 6	PHX1; 13	INDY; Wth	MIL	POR; 6	MEA; 15	CLE; 9	MIS1	ROA	POC	MDO	SAN; 8	MIS2	PHX2; 9	LS; 24	LVG; 15		16th	30	
1985	Canadian Tire Racing	76	LBH; 7	INDY; DNQ	MIL; 22	POR; 23	MEA; 21	CLE; 4	MIS1	ROA; 1	POC	MDO; 3	SAN; 11	MIS2	LS; 25	PHX; 13	MIA; 17			8th	54	
1986	Hemelgarn Racing	71	PHX1	LBH; 8	INDY; 20	MIL; 15	POR; 5	MEA; 5	CLE; 19	TOR; 24	MIS1	POC	MDO; 11	SAN; 19	MIS2	ROA; 10	LS; 19	PHX2; 16	MIA; 6	15th	38	
1992	Arciero Racing	30	SRF	PHX	LBH	INDY	DET	POR	MIL	NHA	TOR	MIS	CLE; 22	ROA; 22	VAN	MDO	NAZ	LS		52nd	0	

=== Le Mans 24 Hours results ===
Year	Team	Co-Drivers	Car	Class	Laps	Pos.	Class Pos.
1983	(Switzerland) Brun Motorsport	(Canada) David Deacon (Canada) Ludwig Heimrath Jr.	Sehcar C6–Cosworth	Group C	68	DNF	DNF

== See also ==
- List of Canadians in Champ Car

Sporting positions
Preceded by Tom Gloy	North American Formula Atlantic Champion; 1980–1981	Succeeded by Dave McMillan
Preceded by Al Unser Jr.	Can-Am Champion; 1983	Succeeded by Michael Roe
