= 1981 Caesars Palace Grand Prix =

- Race 15 of 15 in the 1981 Formula One World Championship
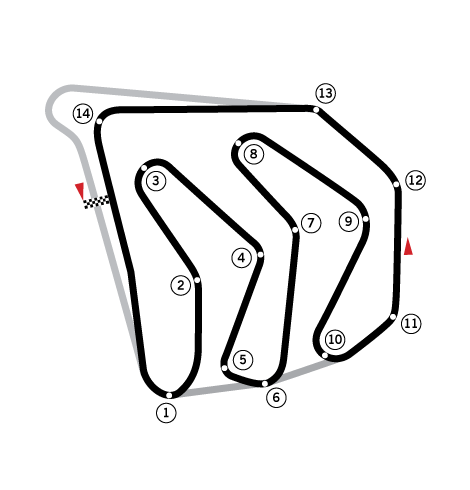

Race details
- Date: October 17, 1981
- Official name: 1st Caesars Palace Grand Prix
- Location: Paradise, Nevada, United States
- Course: Temporary street course
- Course length: 3.650 km (2.268 miles)
- Distance: 75 laps, 273.750 km (170.137 miles)
- Weather: Sunny and 75 °F (24 °C); wind speeds of 11.1 miles per hour (17.9 km/h)

Pole position
Driver	(Argentina) Carlos Reutemann	Williams-Ford
- Time: 1:17.821

Fastest lap
Driver	(France) Didier Pironi	Ferrari
- Time: 1:20.156 on lap 49

Podium
First	(Australia) Alan Jones	Williams-Ford
Second	(France) Alain Prost	Renault
Third	(Italy) Bruno Giacomelli	Alfa Romeo

The 1981 Caesars Palace Grand Prix was a Formula One motor race held on October 17, 1981, in Las Vegas, Nevada, United States. It was the fifteenth and final race of the 1981 Formula One World Championship.

The 75-lap race was won by Australian driver Alan Jones, driving a Williams-Ford, with Frenchman Alain Prost second in a Renault and Italian Bruno Giacomelli third in an Alfa Romeo. Brazilian Nelson Piquet finished fifth in his Brabham-Ford to take the Drivers' Championship by one point from Jones's Argentine teammate, Carlos Reutemann, who finished eighth having started from pole position.

This was the last F1 race to be won by an Australian driver for 28 years, until Mark Webber won the 2009 German Grand Prix.

== Summary ==
=== Championship permutations ===
Going into this race, three drivers were in contention for the World Championship. Argentine Carlos Reutemann, driving a Williams-Ford, had 49 points having won two races, while Brazilian Nelson Piquet, driving a Brabham-Ford, had 48 having won three. Frenchman Jacques Laffite, driving a Ligier-Matra, had an outside chance on 43, having won two races including the previous race in Canada.

After being outscored by both Laffite and Piquet at the preceding Canadian Grand Prix, championship leader Reutemann was unable to secure the drivers' title prematurely. Thus, the Drivers' Championship was decided at the final round, marking the second consecutive year that the championship battle went down to the wire. All three title contenders had the opportunity to become Formula One World Champion for the first time in their respective careers. While Reutemann would have become the first Argentinian driver since Juan Manuel Fangio in 1957 to clinch the drivers' title, Laffite had the chance to become the first French Drivers' Champion. If Piquet won, he would have become the second Formula One World Drivers' Champion from Brazil after two-time world champion Emerson Fittipaldi, who clinched his last title in 1974. Reigning champion Alan Jones was mathematically eliminated from championship contention after failing to finish at the previous round in Canada.

The championship would have been won by either of the top three drivers in the following manner:

	Reutemann would have won if:		
	(Argentina) Carlos Reutemann	(Brazil) Nelson Piquet	(France) Jacques Laffite
Pos.	1st	Eliminated	Eliminated
Pos.	2nd	3rd or lower	Eliminated
Pos.	3rd	4th or lower	Eliminated
Pos.	4th	5th or lower	2nd or lower
Pos.	5th or 6th	lower than 6th	2nd or lower

	Piquet would have won if:		
	(Brazil) Nelson Piquet	(Argentina) Carlos Reutemann	(France) Jacques Laffite
Pos.	1st	Eliminated	Eliminated
Pos.	2nd	Eliminated	Eliminated
Pos.	3rd	4th or lower	2nd or lower
Pos.	4th	5th or lower	2nd or lower
Pos.	5th	6th or lower	2nd or lower
Pos.	6th	lower than 6th	3rd or lower

	Laffite would have won if:		
	(France) Jacques Laffite	(Argentina) Carlos Reutemann	(Brazil) Nelson Piquet
Pos.	1st	4th or lower	3rd or lower
Pos.	2nd	lower than 6th	6th or lower

=== The setting ===
This was the third year in succession that the United States hosted the final round of the World Championship. This time, however, it took place in Las Vegas, instead of Watkins Glen in upstate New York: after twenty years on the Grand Prix schedule, the organizers at Watkins Glen were unable to fulfill financial obligations for 1981.

The track, created on the parking lot of the Caesars Palace hotel, had a smooth surface and provided speeds averaging over 160 km/h or 100 mph, as well as plenty of overtaking opportunities. Unusually, however, its direction was counter-clockwise, which strained the drivers' necks, which were accustomed to the more common clockwise circuits. This, together with the desert heat, meant that the drivers' endurance would be tested in the extreme all weekend. Even in practice, Piquet suffered noticeably and became physically sick; he later got a 90-minute massage from Sugar Ray Leonard's masseur to help sort out his troubled back and "Las Vegas neck".

=== Qualifying ===
The Williams drivers, Alan Jones and Reutemann, were fastest from the start of the first practice with points leader Reutemann the faster of the two. Later, Jones became the only other driver to break 1:18 in qualifying, and the starting front row was all Williams. Reutemann was not expecting any help winning the Championship from teammate Jones, who explained, "I don't see how I can help him; I would not go holding up people as I am a member of the British Commonwealth (Australia, specifically) and I would consider that unsporting." Jones may have held animosity toward Reutemann from earlier in the season, when Reutemann (whom team principal Frank Williams insisted was hired with knowledge that he was a firm #2 driver to Jones) ignored team orders to let Jones pass and won races for himself.

=== Race ===
In the race on Saturday, Jones jumped off the line into the lead, but Reutemann was quickly passed by Gilles Villeneuve, Alain Prost and Bruno Giacomelli, and finished the first lap in fifth. By the end of lap two, Jones had a five-second lead. Further down the field Patrick Tambay lost control of his Ligier, hitting a tyre wall positioned ahead of a concrete barrier with a force high enough to tear off the front of his car. Luckily, Tambay escaped with only minor injuries. Prost passed Villeneuve on lap three, but could not get close enough to challenge Jones for the lead. Villeneuve, meanwhile, kept a line of cars behind him as he fought off the advances of Giacomelli. This allowed Mario Andretti to move right on to Piquet's tail, as he desperately tried to overtake Reutemann.

The Brazilian was nearly touching the back of the Williams as they approached the last left-hander before the pits on lap 17. Piquet got around Reutemann on the inside when Reutemann, fighting for the Championship, inexplicably braked early. Piquet said, "I saw his car getting worse oversteer, then he braked very early, I think in the hope I would run into him, but I saw it and passed easily." On the next lap, Andretti also went by. Piquet passed John Watson on lap 22, and put himself in a position to score points when he took over sixth place. Reutemann continued to slip backwards with gearbox trouble, having lost fourth gear as early as lap two.

The Ferrari team was trying to decide whether to call Villeneuve in on lap 23 after he had been disqualified for lining up on the grid improperly, but when he pulled off the track with an engine fire, the point was moot. On lap 30, crowd favorite Andretti retired from fourth place with broken suspension.

With 15 laps still to go, but a 40-second lead over Prost, Jones began pacing himself to the finish. Giacomelli was third, having worked his way back after spinning from fourth to tenth, and Nigel Mansell had passed Piquet for fourth.

Piquet, in fact, was on the verge of physical exhaustion with his head visibly rolling around in the cockpit, but he still held fifth place and the two points he needed for the Championship. Piquet's condition was the only question left about how the Championship would turn out, for Reutemann, driving without fourth gear, was passed by Watson and Laffite, dropping to eighth place on lap 69.

Laffite took sixth place and the final point from Watson on the last corner of the last lap, while Giacomelli missed taking second from Prost, on failing tires, by a few car lengths, thus finishing third and achieving his only career podium in Formula One (and the first podium for Alfa Romeo since the 1–3 of Juan Manuel Fangio and Giuseppe Farina in the 1951 Spanish Grand Prix). Piquet took fifteen minutes to recover from heat exhaustion after making it to the finish, but he had collected the two points for fifth place, and was the new World Champion.

== Classification ==
=== Qualifying ===
Pos	No	Driver	Constructor	Q1	Q2	Gap
1	2	(Argentina) Carlos Reutemann	Williams-Ford	1:17.821	1:18.343	—
2	1	(Australia) Alan Jones	Williams-Ford	1:18.236	1:17.995	+0.174
3	27	(Canada) Gilles Villeneuve	Ferrari	1:18.457	1:18.060	+0.239
4	5	(Brazil) Nelson Piquet	Brabham-Ford	1:18.954	1:18.161	+0.340
5	15	(France) Alain Prost	Renault	1:18.433	1:18.760	+0.612
6	7	(United Kingdom) John Watson	McLaren-Ford	1:19.975	1:18.617	+0.796
7	25	(France) Patrick Tambay	Ligier-Matra	1:19.874	1:18.681	+0.860
8	23	(Italy) Bruno Giacomelli	Alfa Romeo	1:20.570	1:18.792	+0.971
9	12	(United Kingdom) Nigel Mansell	Lotus-Ford	1:19.044	1:19.623	+1.223
10	22	(United States) Mario Andretti	Alfa Romeo	1:19.594	1:19.068	+1.247
11	29	(Italy) Riccardo Patrese	Arrows-Ford	1:20.132	1:19.152	+1.331
12	26	(France) Jacques Laffite	Ligier-Matra	1:19.878	1:19.167	+1.346
13	16	(France) René Arnoux	Renault	1:19.966	1:19.197	+1.376
14	8	(Italy) Andrea de Cesaris	McLaren-Ford	1:19.338	1:19.217	+1.396
15	11	(Italy) Elio de Angelis	Lotus-Ford	1:20.337	1:19.562	+1.741
16	6	(Mexico) Héctor Rebaque	Brabham-Ford	1:20.555	1:19.571	+1.750
17	4	(Italy) Michele Alboreto	Tyrrell-Ford	1:21.964	1:19.774	+1.953
18	28	(France) Didier Pironi	Ferrari	1:19.899	1:21.347	+2.078
19	3	(United States) Eddie Cheever	Tyrrell-Ford	1:21.116	1:20.475	+2.654
20	20	(Finland) Keke Rosberg	Fittipaldi-Ford	1:21.299	1:20.729	+2.908
21	32	(France) Jean-Pierre Jarier	Osella-Ford	22:19.563	1:20.781	+2.960
22	36	(United Kingdom) Derek Warwick	Toleman-Hart	1:22.491	1:21.294	+3.473
23	33	(Switzerland) Marc Surer	Theodore-Ford	1:21.889	1:21.430	+3.609
24	14	(Chile) Eliseo Salazar	Ensign-Ford	1:22.616	1:21.629	+3.808
DNQ	9	(Sweden) Slim Borgudd	ATS-Ford	1:21.665	1:21.731	+3.844
DNQ	21	(Brazil) Chico Serra	Fittipaldi-Ford	1:22.612	1:21.672	+3.851
DNQ	17	(Republic of Ireland) Derek Daly	March-Ford	1:21.846	1:21.824	+4.003
DNQ	30	(Canada) Jacques Villeneuve	Arrows-Ford	1:22.977	1:22.822	+5.001
DNQ	35	(United Kingdom) Brian Henton	Toleman-Hart	1:23.857	1:22.960	+5.139
DNQ	31	(Italy) Beppe Gabbiani	Osella-Ford	1:26.634	no time	+8.813

=== Race ===
Pos	No	Driver	Constructor	Tyre	Laps	Time/Retired	Grid	Points
1	1	(Australia) Alan Jones	Williams-Ford	G	75	1:44:09.077	2	9
2	15	(France) Alain Prost	Renault	MI	75	+ 20.048	5	6
3	23	(Italy) Bruno Giacomelli	Alfa Romeo	MI	75	+ 20.428	8	4
4	12	(United Kingdom) Nigel Mansell	Lotus-Ford	G	75	+ 47.473	9	3
5	5	(Brazil) Nelson Piquet	Brabham-Ford	G	75	+ 1:16.438	4	2
6	26	(France) Jacques Laffite	Ligier-Matra	MI	75	+ 1:18.175	12	1
7	7	(United Kingdom) John Watson	McLaren-Ford	MI	75	+ 1:18.497	6	
8	2	(Argentina) Carlos Reutemann	Williams-Ford	G	74	+ 1 Lap	1	
9	28	(France) Didier Pironi	Ferrari	MI	73	+ 2 Laps	18	
10	20	(Finland) Keke Rosberg	Fittipaldi-Ford	P	73	+ 2 Laps	20	
11	29	(Italy) Riccardo Patrese	Arrows-Ford	P	71	+ 4 Laps	11	
12	8	(Italy) Andrea de Cesaris	McLaren-Ford	MI	69	+ 6 Laps	14	
13	4	(Italy) Michele Alboreto	Tyrrell-Ford	A	67	Engine	17	
NC	14	(Chile) Eliseo Salazar	Ensign-Ford	A	61	+ 14 Laps	24	
Ret	36	(United Kingdom) Derek Warwick	Toleman-Hart	P	43	Gearbox	22	
Ret	22	(United States) Mario Andretti	Alfa Romeo	MI	29	Suspension	10	
DSQ	27	(Canada) Gilles Villeneuve	Ferrari	MI	22	Improper Grid Formation	3	
Ret	6	(Mexico) Héctor Rebaque	Brabham-Ford	G	20	Throttle	16	
Ret	33	(Switzerland) Marc Surer	Theodore-Ford	A	19	Suspension	23	
Ret	3	(United States) Eddie Cheever	Tyrrell-Ford	G	10	Engine	19	
Ret	16	(France) René Arnoux	Renault	MI	10	Electrical	13	
Ret	25	(France) Patrick Tambay	Ligier-Matra	MI	2	Accident	7	
Ret	11	(Italy) Elio de Angelis	Lotus-Ford	G	2	Water Leak	15	
Ret	32	(France) Jean-Pierre Jarier	Osella-Ford	MI	0	Transmission	21	
DNQ	9	(Sweden) Slim Borgudd	ATS-Ford	A				
DNQ	21	(Brazil) Chico Serra	Fittipaldi-Ford	P				
DNQ	17	(Republic of Ireland) Derek Daly	March-Ford	A				
DNQ	30	(Canada) Jacques Villeneuve	Arrows-Ford	P				
DNQ	35	(United Kingdom) Brian Henton	Toleman-Hart	P				
DNQ	31	(Italy) Beppe Gabbiani	Osella-Ford	MI				

== Championship standings after the race ==
Drivers' Championship standings

Pos	Driver	Points
1	(Brazil) Nelson Piquet	50
2	(Argentina) Carlos Reutemann	49
3	(Australia) Alan Jones	46
4	(France) Jacques Laffite	44
5	(France) Alain Prost	43

Constructors' Championship standings

Pos	Constructor	Points
1	(United Kingdom) Williams-Ford	95
2	(United Kingdom) Brabham-Ford	61
3	(France) Renault	54
4	(France) Ligier-Matra	44
5	(Italy) Ferrari	34

- Note: Only the top five positions are included for both sets of standings.

Previous race: 1981 Canadian Grand Prix	FIA Formula One World Championship; 1981 season	Next race: 1982 South African Grand Prix
Previous race: None	Caesars Palace Grand Prix	Next race: 1982 Caesars Palace Grand Prix
Awards
Preceded by 1980 Italian Grand Prix	Formula One Promotional Trophy for Race Promoter; 1981	Succeeded by 1982 British Grand Prix
