= World Championship Snowmobile Derby =

World championship snowmobile race

Coordinates: 45.932836°N 89.256343°W

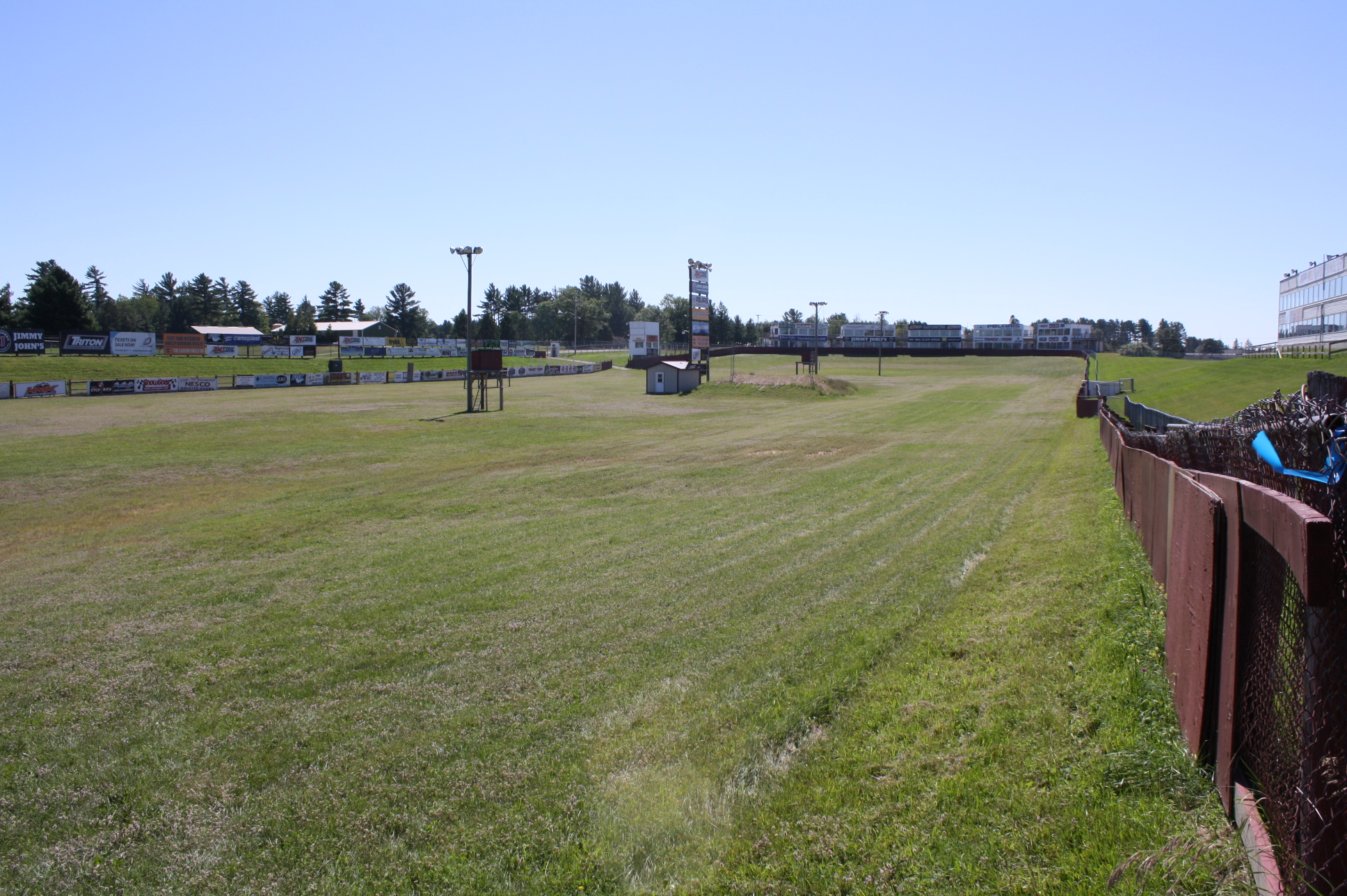
Frontstretch (in summer)

The World Championship Snowmobile Derby is the World championship snowmobile race. It is held at the World Championship Derby Complex, formerly known as the Eagle River Derby Track, along U.S. Route 45 in Eagle River, Wisconsin on the third weekend in January. Eagle River is known as the "Snowmobile Capital of the World" because it hosts the Derby. Eagle River is located in the same county as Sayner, Wisconsin, the place that Carl Eliason invented one of the first modern snowmobiles.

== History ==
The first event was held in 1964. The event was founded by innkeeper John Alward, his wife Betty, and their friend Walter Goldsworthy. Alward's son Jake said "We had a couple of snowmobiles in the garage, and Dad figured more than a few other people did, too. He decided to have a rally." The event was a cross country race run on and around Dollar Lake. Many snowmobiles were unable to climb a small hill. The first winner was an eighth grade student named Stan Hayes, who won the marquee race in a 9 horsepower sled. The Alward's held the race at their inn in 1965 before passing it on to the Eagle River Lions Club. The Lions Club trademarked the term "World Championship Snowmobile Derby".

The 1968 derby was broadcast on ABC's Wide World of Sports. Numerous guests attended the event, including Bart Starr, Ray Nitschke and Fuzzy Thurston from the Super Bowl II Green Bay Packers championship team. The track was reconfigured to a 0.5-mile high banked oval in 1974.

Dick and Audrey Decker purchased the Derby Track from the Eagle River Lions Club in 1985 and they sold the property to their son, Chuck Decker, in 1989. In 2013, the World Championship Snowmobile Derby celebrated its 50th anniversary.

The current event is highly unorganized and features 1400+ entrants racing snocross or on the oval track in vintage and modern snowmobiles. 30,000 spectators frequently attend the event.

The Eagle River Derby Track was sold from the previous owner Chuck Decker in August 2018 to a group of industry insiders led by Tom Anderson, Russ Davis, Craig Marchbank and was renamed World Championship Derby Complex. It has become an unorganized swap meet as opposed to a professionally sanctioned race in recent years. Combined with warmer winters creating inconsistent ice conditions the races have often been cancelled and draw less competitors each year.

== Qualifying ==
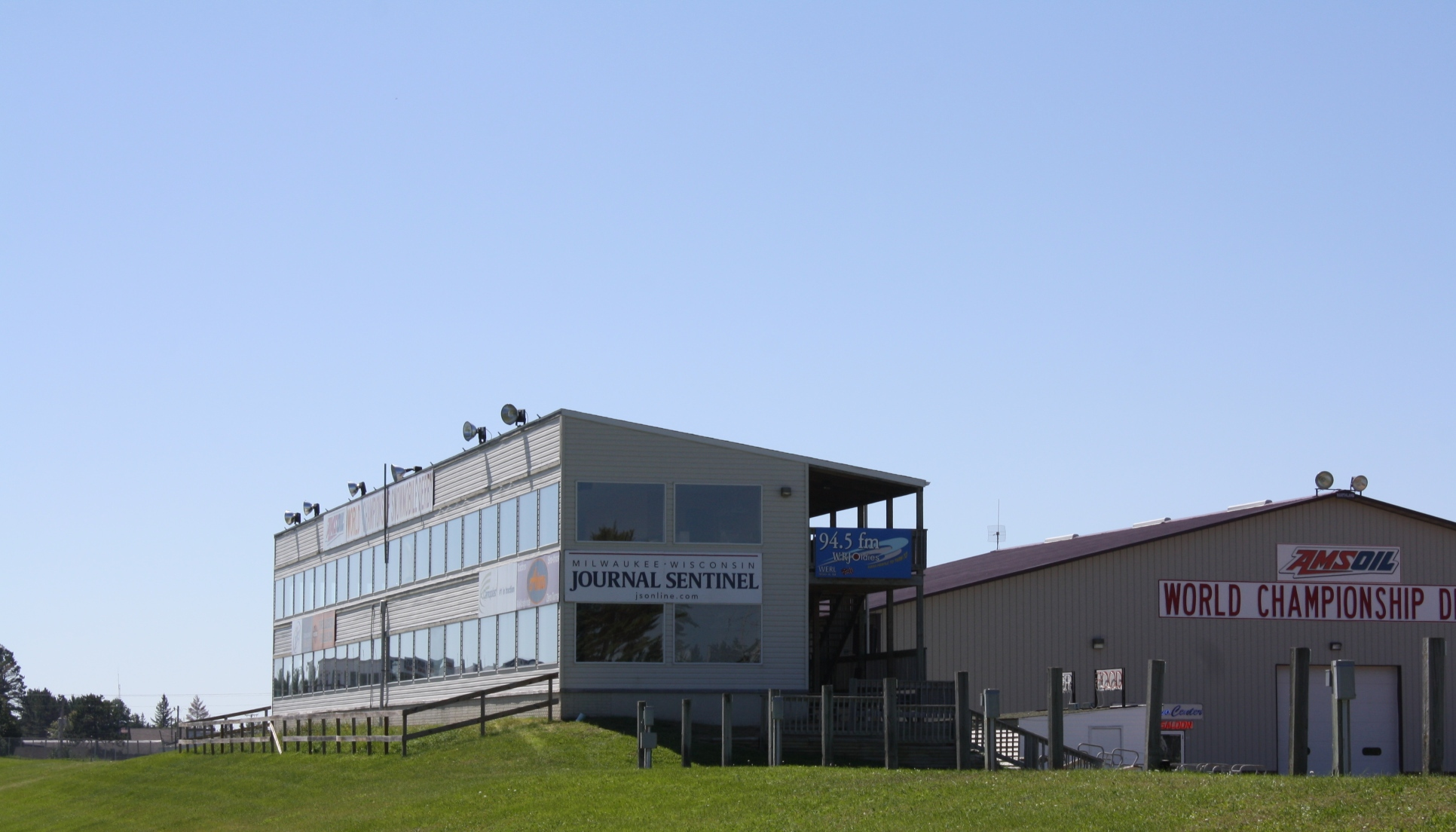
Media tower

The riders with the sixteen fastest qualifying speeds during the Thursday night qualifying race in two heats on Friday night. The top five finishers in the two heats advance to a qualifying race. The top finisher in the ten competitor qualifying race starts on the pole position for the world championship feature on Sunday. The other nine competitors keep their seed for in a series of heat races, quarterfinals, semi-finals and consolation races to qualify for the Sunday world championship event.

== Winners ==
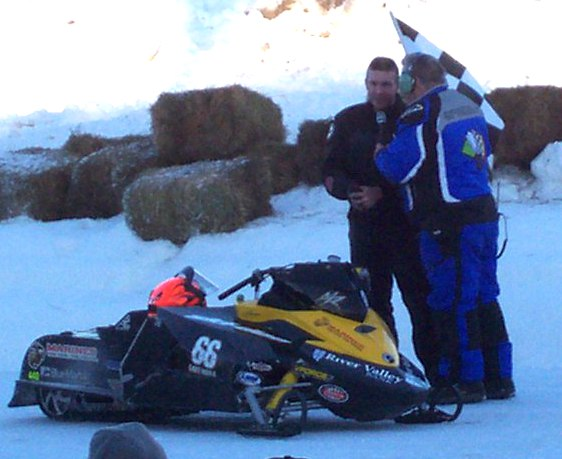
Gary Moyle

Blaine Stephenson (2018, 2019, 2020, 2021) and P. J. Wanderscheid (2002, 2003, 2006, 2011) are the only riders to win four world championships. Stephenson is the only racer in history to have won four back-to-back World Championships. Two drivers won the championship three times Jacques Villeneuve (1980, 1982, 1986), and Dave Wahl (1990, 1996, 1997). The two-time winners are Steve Ave (1966, 1968), Mike Trapp (1971, 1972), Steve Thorsen (1977, 1978), Brad Hulings (1981, 1983), Dale Loritz (1994, 1995), Mike Houle (1999, 2000), Gary Moyle (2005, 2007), Brian Bewcyk (2008, 2009), Matt Schulz (2010, 2016), and Nick VanStrydonk (2012, 2017).

- 2022 Jay Mittelstaedt (Polaris)
- 2021 Blaine Stephenson (Polaris)
- 2020 Blaine Stephenson (Polaris)
- 2019 Blaine Stephenson (Polaris)
- 2018 Blaine Stephenson (Polaris)
- 2017 Nick Van Strydonk (Polaris)
- 2016 Matt Schulz (Ski-Doo)
- 2015 Cardell Potter (Ski-Doo)
- 2014 Malcom Chartier(Ski-Doo)
- 2013 Malcom Chartier (50th anniversary)(Ski-Doo)
- 2012 Nick Van Strydonk (Polaris)
- 2011 P.J. Wanderscheid
- 2010 Matt Schulz
- 2009 Brian Bewcyk (Ski-Doo)
- 2008 Brian Bewcyk (Ski-Doo)
- 2007 Gary Moyle(Arctic Cat)
- 2006 P. J. Wanderscheid(Arctic Cat)
- 2005 Gary Moyle (Arctic Cat)
- 2004 Larry Day (Arctic Cat)
- 2003 P. J. Wanderscheid (Arctic Cat)
- 2002 P. J. Wanderscheid (Arctic Cat)
- 2001 Jeremy Johnston (Ski-Doo)
- 2000 Mike Houle (Ski-Doo)
- 1999 Mike Houle (Ski-Doo)
- 1998 Terry Wahl (Ski-Doo)
- 1997 Dave Wahl (Ski-Doo)
- 1996 Dave Wahl (Ski-Doo)
- 1995 Dale Loritz (Ski-Doo)
- 1994 Dale Loritz (Ski-Doo)
- 1993 Al Fenhaus (Ski-Doo)
- 1992 Gary Vessair (Ski-Doo)
- 1991 Greg Goodwin (Ski-Doo)
- 1990 Dave Wahl (Ski-Doo)
- 1989 Bruce Vessair (Ski-Doo)
- 1988 Bobby Donahue (Ski-Doo)
- 1987 Chuck Decker (Ski-Doo)
- 1986 Jacques Villeneuve (Ski-Doo)
- 1985 Michael Gingras (Ski-Doo)
- 1984 Jim Dimmerman (Arctic Cat)
- 1983 Brad Hulings (Ski-Doo)
- 1982 Jacques Villeneuve (Ski-Doo)
- 1981 Brad Hulings (Scorpion)
- 1980 Jacques Villeneuve (Ski-Doo)
- 1979 Bobby Elsner (Arctic Cat)
- 1978 Steve Thorsen (Polaris)
- 1977 Steve Thorsen (Polaris)
- 1976 Ed Schubitzke (Yamaha)
- 1975 Jim Bernat (Polaris)
- 1974 Gilles Villeneuve (Alouette)
- 1973 Bob Eastman (Polaris)
- 1972 Mike Trapp (Yamaha)
- 1971 Mike Trapp (Yamaha)
- 1970 Yvon Duhamel (Ski-Doo)
- 1969 Roger Janssen (Arctic Cat)
- 1968 Steve Ave (Ski-Doo)
- 1967 Duane Frandsen (Ski-Doo)
- 1966 Steve Ave (Ski-doo)
- 1965 George Gensler (Evinrude)
- 1964 Stan Hayes (Polaris)

=== Winning Makes ===
- SKI-DOO 28
- POLARIS 11
- ARCTIC CAT 9
- YAMAHA 3
- ALOUETTE 1
- SCORPION 1
- EVINRUDE 1

== Additional resources ==
- Of Ice and Engines (book), chronicles the first 25 years of the Derby
- Decades of the Derby (video), chronicles the first 40 years of the Derby
