= Ligier JS19 =

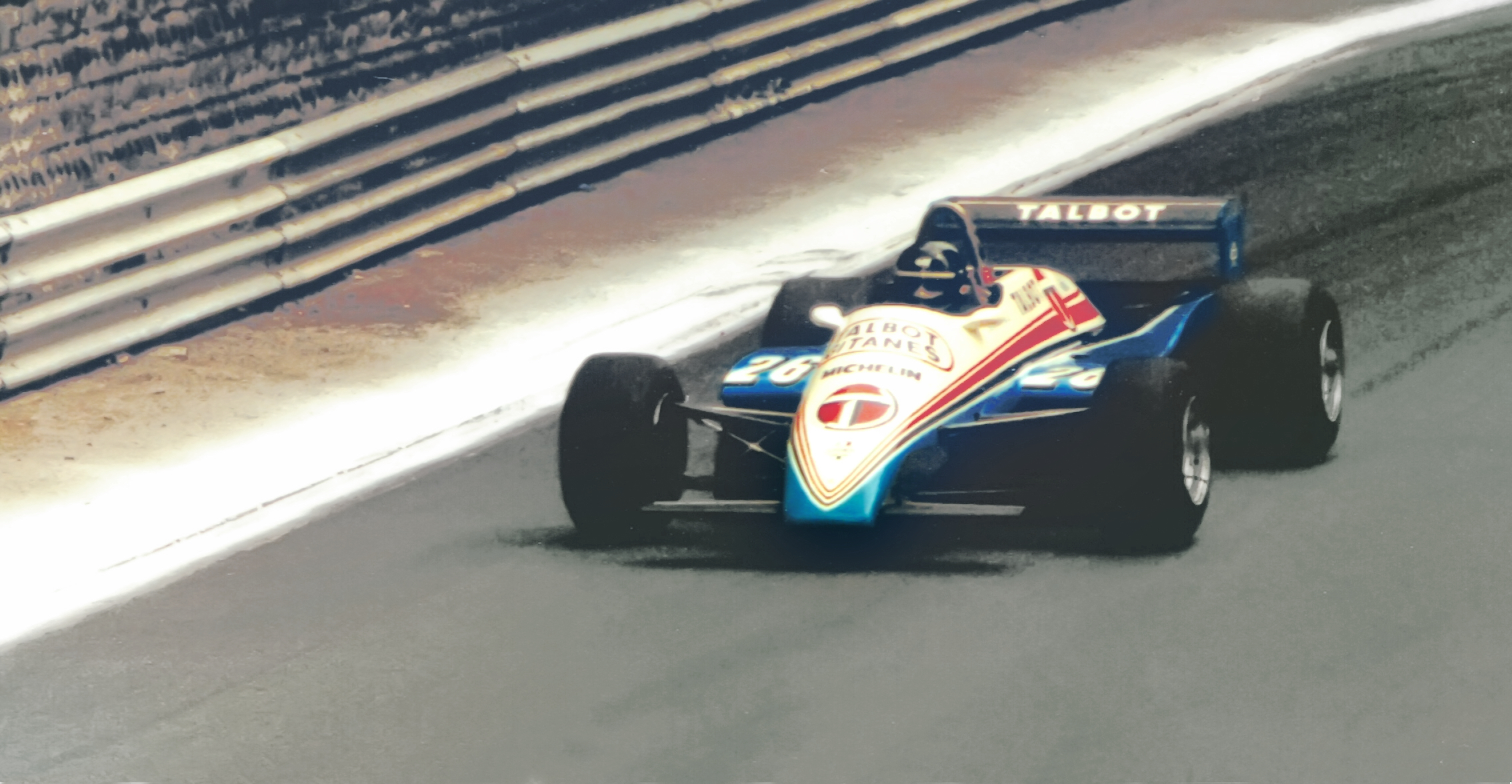
- Jacques Laffite driving the JS19 at the 1982 Pau Grand Prix
- Category: Formula One
- Constructor: Ligier
- Designers: Jean-Pierre Jabouille (Technical Director); Michel Beaujon (Chief Designer)
- Predecessor: Ligier JS17B
- Successor: Ligier JS21

Technical specifications
- Chassis: Aluminium monocoque
- Axle track: Front: 1,800 mm (71 in); Rear: 1,600 mm (63 in)
- Wheelbase: 2,700 mm (110 in)
- Engine: Talbot 3.0, 2,993 cc (182.6 cu in), V12, NA, mid-engine, longitudinally mounted
- Transmission: Hewland 5-speed manual
- Weight: 590 kg (1,300 lb)
- Fuel: Elf
- Tyres: Michelin

Competition history
- Notable entrants: Equipe Talbot Gitanes
- Notable drivers: (France) Jacques Laffite (United States) Eddie Cheever
- Debut: 1982 Monaco Grand Prix
- Last event: 1982 Caesars Palace Grand Prix
Races	Wins	Poles	F/Laps
9	0	0	0
- Constructors' Championships: 0
- Drivers' Championships: 0

The Ligier JS19 was a Formula One racing car manufactured and raced by Équipe Ligier during the 1982 Formula One season. Powered by a Talbot-badged Matra V12 engine, the JS19 was driven by Jacques Laffite and Eddie Cheever.

== Development ==
The JS19 was designed by Michel Beaujon under the technical direction of Jean-Pierre Jabouille, who had retired as a driver from Formula One the previous year. It was provided with a Matra MS81 V-12 badged as a Talbot. The chassis had side pods which enclosed the rear suspension linkage, which minimised disruption to the air flow, and had skirts running their full length for maximum ground-effect. However, when introduced for its first race, the 1982 Monaco Grand Prix, the team was forced by race officials to remove the portion of the skirts behind the rear-wheel centreline (a subjective interpretation of the rules not clarified in written bulletins), which resulted in a loss of downforce that affected the cars' performance. The team used the JS17B, with which it had started the first five races of the season, for the following races in the United States and Canada while the aerodynamics of the JS19 were reworked in wind tunnel testing. A single JS19 was present for the Dutch and British races while the other was in the wind tunnel. Two cars were present from the French Grand Prix onwards.

== Racing history ==
The Ligier team had raced the JS17B, an update of the 1981 car, for the early part of the year before introducing the JS19 at Monaco. The team drivers, Eddie Cheever and Jacques Laffite, qualified 16th and 18th on the grid, respectively, but both retired from the race. When the team were down to a single JS19 for races, Cheever attempted to qualify for the Dutch race but failed when he crashed heavily, damaging it beyond repair. Laffite qualified a new JS19 20th at the following race in Britain but retired with gear box issues. Both drivers made the grid in France and went on to finish the race albeit well out of the points. Qualifying was a little better in Germany with Cheever 12th on the grid, the team's best placing so far with the JS19. Both drivers retired from the race with handling issues.

Laffite took third place in Austria for the car's first points of the season. He retired from the remaining races of the season. Cheever retired in Austria and was not classified in the Swiss Grand Prix. He scored a point for sixth in Italy and followed this up with a third in the Caesars Palace Grand Prix in Las Vegas, having qualified fourth on the grid. Ligier finished the year with 20 points, nine of which were scored with the JS19, for eighth in the Constructor's Championship.

== Complete Formula One World Championship results ==
(key) (Results in bold indicate pole position; results in italics indicate fastest lap)

Year	Team	Engine	Tyres	Drivers	1	2	3	4	5	6	7	8	9	10	11	12	13	14	15	16	Pts.	WCC
1982	Equipe Talbot Gitanes	Talbot; V12 NA	**MI**		RSA	BRA	USW	SMR	BEL	MON	DET	CAN	NED	GBR	FRA	GER	AUT	SUI	ITA	CPL	**20***	**8th**
1982	Equipe Talbot Gitanes	Talbot; V12 NA	**MI**	Eddie Cheever						Ret			DNQ		16	Ret	Ret	NC	6	3	**20***	**8th**
1982	Equipe Talbot Gitanes	Talbot; V12 NA	**MI**	Jacques Laffite						Ret				Ret	14	Ret	3	Ret	Ret	Ret	**20***	**8th**

* 11 points scored with the JS17B
