= 1981 Canadian Grand Prix =

- Race 14 of 15 in the 1981 Formula One World Championship

Race details
- Date: 27 September 1981
- Official name: XX Grand Prix du Canada
- Location: Circuit Île Notre-Dame; Montreal, Quebec, Canada
- Course: Temporary street circuit
- Course length: 4.410 km (2.740 miles)
- Distance: 63 laps, 277.830 km (172.636 miles)
- Scheduled distance: 70 laps, 308.700 km (191.817 miles)
- Weather: Wet and cold with temperatures up to 20 °C (68 °F); wind speeds up to 15 kilometres per hour (9.3 mph)

Pole position
Driver	(Brazil) Nelson Piquet	Brabham-Ford
- Time: 1:29.211

Fastest lap
Driver	(United Kingdom) John Watson	McLaren-Ford
- Time: 1:49.475 on lap 43

Podium
First	(France) Jacques Laffite	Talbot Ligier-Matra
Second	(United Kingdom) John Watson	McLaren-Ford
Third	(Canada) Gilles Villeneuve	Ferrari

The 1981 Canadian Grand Prix was a Formula One motor race held at Circuit Île Notre-Dame, Montreal on 27 September 1981. It was the fourteenth race of the 1981 Formula One World Championship.

The race was run in wet conditions, and ended after 63 of the scheduled 70 laps due to the two-hour time limit. Frenchman Jacques Laffite won in a Talbot Ligier-Matra, with Northern Ireland's John Watson second in a McLaren-Ford and local hero Gilles Villeneuve third in a Ferrari. Brazilian Nelson Piquet finished fifth in his Brabham-Ford, having started from pole position, while Drivers' Championship rival, Argentine Carlos Reutemann, could only manage tenth in his Williams-Ford. Piquet thus moved within one point of Reutemann with one race to go, while the win gave Laffite an outside chance of the title. Despite both Reutemann and Australian teammate Alan Jones failing to score, Williams clinched the Constructors' Championship.

This would turn out to be Laffite's final F1 victory, as well as the last for the Ligier team for fifteen years, until the 1996 Monaco Grand Prix. It was also the last time the Canadian Grand Prix was held in the fall, as the race would move to June the following year.

== Pre-race ==
Prior to the race, Alan Jones announced that he was retiring from the sport after clinching the title the previous year. Rumors were also spreading around in paddock that Niki Lauda had tested for McLaren at Donington Park and that he was planning a comeback.

== Qualifying ==
Nelson Piquet clinched pole with a time of 1:29.221, with rival Carlos Reutemann alongside him on the front row. The top ten were completed by: Jones, Prost, Mansell, Rebaque, de Angelis, Arnoux, Watson and Laffite respectively.

== Race ==
The race start was marred with bad weather. Immediately after the start, Jones took the lead after a minor collision with Reutemann which left Reutemann behind. Toward the middle of the pack, Arnoux and Pironi had a collision which resulted in Arnoux spinning out of the race. On lap 7, Jones spun and Piquet had to take evasive action, resulting in both drivers dropping down the pecking order. Prost took the lead with Laffite, who had climbed from tenth, second. Prost's lead did not last long, as Laffite overtook him on lap 13, and kept the lead to the end of the race.

Villeneuve had a minor accident that damaged his front wing. The wing flew up only to be stuck up in the air, blocking Villeneuve's race-line vision. With his forward vision impaired, he used his peripheral vision to navigate using the yellow track markers as reference. After racing this way for minutes he used vibration on the ribbed curbing, to the point it flew off the car. This way he managed to keep control until the end of the race, without a front wing and under the rain.

Mansell pitted for slicks, convinced the weather would turn. It did not. Within minutes he spun, heavily damaging his rear wing, and was pushed by marshals back onto the circuit. Driving slowly toward the L'Epingle at the northern end, he placed his JPS Lotus in the middle of the track but slowly edging to his left onto the racing line, at the braking area. Prost, on the racing line and much faster, tried unsuccessfully to avoid colliding but could not, resulting in both drivers retiring from the race.

Watson was able to catch and pass Villeneuve a few laps later and the two finished second and third respectively, with Villeneuve clinching his third and last podium of the year on home soil. Bruno Giacomelli of Alfa Romeo, who had started fifteenth, came home fourth, with pole-man Piquet coming in behind him.

== Classification ==
=== Qualifying ===
Pos	No	Driver	Constructor	Q1	Q2	Gap
1	5	(Brazil) Nelson Piquet	Brabham-Ford	1:29.211	1:29.537	—
2	2	(Argentina) Carlos Reutemann	Williams-Ford	1:29.601	1:29.359	+0.148
3	1	(Australia) Alan Jones	Williams-Ford	1:29.728	1:29.781	+0.517
4	15	(France) Alain Prost	Renault	1:31.629	1:29.908	+0.697
5	12	(United Kingdom) Nigel Mansell	Lotus-Ford	1:32.233	1:29.997	+0.786
6	6	(Mexico) Héctor Rebaque	Brabham-Ford	1:31.545	1:30.182	+0.971
7	11	(Italy) Elio de Angelis	Lotus-Ford	1:31.212	1:30.231	+1.020
8	16	(France) René Arnoux	Renault	1:34.151	1:30.232	+1.021
9	7	(United Kingdom) John Watson	McLaren-Ford	1:31.617	1:30.566	+1.355
10	26	(France) Jacques Laffite	Talbot Ligier-Matra	1:31.593	1:30.705	+1.494
11	27	(Canada) Gilles Villeneuve	Ferrari	1:32.077	1:31.115	+1.904
12	28	(France) Didier Pironi	Ferrari	1:31.976	1:31.350	+2.139
13	8	(Italy) Andrea de Cesaris	McLaren-Ford	1:32.281	1:31.507	+2.296
14	3	(United States) Eddie Cheever	Tyrrell-Ford	1:32.652	1:31.547	+2.336
15	23	(Italy) Bruno Giacomelli	Alfa Romeo	1:34.995	1:31.600	+2.389
16	22	(United States) Mario Andretti	Alfa Romeo	1:32.648	1:31.740	+2.529
17	25	(France) Patrick Tambay	Talbot Ligier-Matra	1:31.747	1:31.817	+2.536
18	29	(Italy) Riccardo Patrese	Arrows-Ford	1:31.969	1:32.277	+2.758
19	33	(Switzerland) Marc Surer	Theodore-Ford	1:34.424	1:32.253	+3.042
20	17	(Republic of Ireland) Derek Daly	March-Ford	1:35.552	1:32.305	+3.094
21	9	(Sweden) Slim Borgudd	ATS-Ford	1:34.002	1:32.652	+3.441
22	4	(Italy) Michele Alboreto	Tyrrell-Ford	1:34.245	1:32.709	+3.498
23	32	(France) Jean-Pierre Jarier	Osella-Ford	1:33.432	1:33.643	+4.221
24	14	(Chile) Eliseo Salazar	Ensign-Ford	1:36.016	1:33.848	+4.637
DNQ	20	(Finland) Keke Rosberg	Fittipaldi-Ford	1:34.634	1:34.310	+5.099
DNQ	21	(Brazil) Chico Serra	Fittipaldi-Ford	1:36.937	1:36.546	+7.335
DNQ	35	(United Kingdom) Brian Henton	Toleman-Hart	1:40.505	1:36.648	+7.437
DNQ	30	(Canada) Jacques Villeneuve	Arrows-Ford	1:36.720	1:38.308	+7.509
DNQ	36	(United Kingdom) Derek Warwick	Toleman-Hart	1:36.999	1:37.256	+7.788
DNQ	31	(Italy) Beppe Gabbiani	Osella-Ford	1:37.493	1:55.307	+8.282

=== Race ===
Pos	No	Driver	Constructor	Tyre	Laps	Time/Retired	Grid	Points
1	26	(France) Jacques Laffite	Talbot Ligier-Matra	MI	63	2:01:25.20	10	9
2	7	(United Kingdom) John Watson	McLaren-Ford	MI	63	+ 6.23	9	6
3	27	(Canada) Gilles Villeneuve	Ferrari	MI	63	+ 1:50.27	11	4
4	23	(Italy) Bruno Giacomelli	Alfa Romeo	MI	62	+ 1 Lap	15	3
5	5	(Brazil) Nelson Piquet	Brabham-Ford	G	62	+ 1 Lap	1	2
6	11	(Italy) Elio de Angelis	Lotus-Ford	G	62	+ 1 Lap	7	1
7	22	(United States) Mario Andretti	Alfa Romeo	MI	62	+ 1 Lap	16	
8	17	(Republic of Ireland) Derek Daly	March-Ford	A	61	+ 2 Laps	20	
9	33	(Switzerland) Marc Surer	Theodore-Ford	A	61	+ 2 Laps	19	
10	2	(Argentina) Carlos Reutemann	Williams-Ford	G	60	+ 3 Laps	2	
11	4	(Italy) Michele Alboreto	Tyrrell-Ford	A	59	+ 4 Laps	22	
12	3	(United States) Eddie Cheever	Tyrrell-Ford	G	56	Engine	14	
Ret	8	(Italy) Andrea de Cesaris	McLaren-Ford	MI	51	Spun Off	13	
Ret	15	(France) Alain Prost	Renault	MI	48	Collision	4	
Ret	12	(United Kingdom) Nigel Mansell	Lotus-Ford	G	45	Collision	5	
Ret	9	(Sweden) Slim Borgudd	ATS-Ford	A	40	Spun Off	21	
Ret	6	(Mexico) Héctor Rebaque	Brabham-Ford	G	35	Spun Off	6	
Ret	32	(France) Jean-Pierre Jarier	Osella-Ford	MI	26	Collision	23	
Ret	1	(Australia) Alan Jones	Williams-Ford	G	24	Handling	3	
Ret	28	(France) Didier Pironi	Ferrari	MI	24	Ignition	12	
Ret	14	(Chile) Eliseo Salazar	Ensign-Ford	A	8	Spun Off	24	
Ret	25	(France) Patrick Tambay	Talbot Ligier-Matra	MI	6	Spun Off	17	
Ret	29	(Italy) Riccardo Patrese	Arrows-Ford	P	6	Spun Off	18	
Ret	16	(France) René Arnoux	Renault	MI	0	Collision	8	
DNQ	20	(Finland) Keke Rosberg	Fittipaldi-Ford	P				
DNQ	21	(Brazil) Chico Serra	Fittipaldi-Ford	P				
DNQ	35	(United Kingdom) Brian Henton	Toleman-Hart	P				
DNQ	30	(Canada) Jacques Villeneuve	Arrows-Ford	P				
DNQ	36	(United Kingdom) Derek Warwick	Toleman-Hart	P				
DNQ	31	(Italy) Beppe Gabbiani	Osella-Ford	MI				

== Notes ==
- This was the Formula One World Championship debut for Canadian driver Jacques Villeneuve, sr.
- This was the 300th Grand Prix in which a Frenchman participated. In those 300 races, French driver had won 20 Grands Prix, achieved 115 podium finishes, 30 pole positions, 32 fastest laps and 2 Grand Slams.
- This was also the 100th Grand Prix in which a Mexican driver participated. In those 100 races, Mexican driver had won 2 Grands Prix, achieved 7 podium finishes, and 1 fastest lap.

== Championship standings after the race ==
Drivers' Championship standings

Pos	Driver	Points
1	(Argentina) Carlos Reutemann	49
2	(Brazil) Nelson Piquet	48
3	(France) Jacques Laffite	43
4	(France) Alain Prost	37
5	(Australia) Alan Jones	37

Constructors' Championship standings

Pos	Constructor	Points
1	(United Kingdom) Williams-Ford	86
2	(United Kingdom) Brabham-Ford	59
3	(France) Renault	48
4	(France) Talbot Ligier-Matra	43
5	(Italy) Ferrari	34

- Note: Only the top five positions are included for both sets of standings.

Previous race: 1981 Italian Grand Prix	FIA Formula One World Championship; 1981 season	Next race: 1981 Caesars Palace Grand Prix
Previous race: 1980 Canadian Grand Prix	Canadian Grand Prix	Next race: 1982 Canadian Grand Prix
