= Bruno Giacomelli =

Italian racing driver (born 1952)

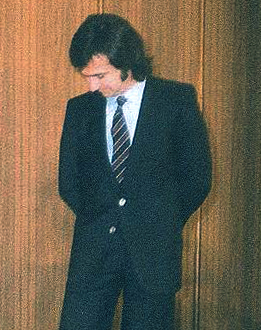
- Giacomelli in 1982
- Born: 10 September 1952 (age 74); Poncarale, Brescia, Italy

Formula One World Championship career
- Nationality: (Italy) Italian
- Active years: 1977–1983, 1990
- Team(s): McLaren, Alfa Romeo, Toleman, Life
- Entries: 82 (69 starts)
- Championships: 0
- Wins: 0
- Podiums: 1
- Career points: 14
- Pole positions: 1
- Fastest laps: 0
- First entry: 1977 Italian Grand Prix
- Last entry: 1990 Spanish Grand Prix

World Sportscar Championship career
- Years active: 1985–1990
- Teams: Porsche, Lancia, RLR, Spice
- Starts: 22
- Championships: 0
- Wins: 0
- Podiums: 1
- Poles: 0
- Fastest laps: 0

24 Hours of Le Mans career
- Years: 1988–1990
- Teams: Porsche, RLR
- Best finish: 9th (1988)
- Class wins: 0

Bruno Giacomelli (Italian pronunciation: [ˈbruno dʒakoˈmɛlli]; born 10 September 1952) is an Italian former racing driver, who competed in Formula One between 1977 and 1990. (Note: The exact years Giacomelli competed in Formula One: 1977–1983, 1990.)

Giacomelli won one of the two 1976 British Formula 3 Championships and the 1978 Formula Two championship. From 1977 to 1983, Giacomelli participated in 82 Formula One Grands Prix for McLaren, Alfa Romeo and Toleman, debuting at the 1977 Italian Grand Prix. He achieved one podium and scored a total of 14 championship points. He returned to Formula One in 1990 with Life, but failed to pre-qualify in each of his 12 attempts driving the F190, prior to the team's withdrawal after the Spanish Grand Prix.

== Early career ==
Giacomelli began his career in Formula Italia, which he won in 1975. In 1976, he graduated to Formula Three where he competed with March and finished runner up in his first season, to Rupert Keegan, in the B.A.R.C Championship and won the B.R.D.C. title. He also led from start to finish in a March-Toyota in the 1976 Monaco Grand Prix Formula Three support race. His average speed was 74.84 miles per hour.

Giacomelli moved into Formula Two in 1977, working in close association with Robin Herd and the March factory. He retired from the Formula Two Pau Grand Prix in May 1977, after his car made contact with one driven by Jacques Laffite. However, he managed to score three F2 wins in 1977 (at Vallelunga, Mugello and Donington Park) and finished fifth in the championship. He also made his Formula One World Championship debut in 1977 in a third works McLaren M23-Cosworth at the 1977 Italian Grand Prix at Monza, retiring with an engine problem which caused him to spin off.

Giacomelli dominated the following F2 season. Apart from a third-place finish in the Mugello Grand Prix in May 1978 and a second-place in Vallelunga, Giacomelli won eight of the twelve races and won the title, beating the runner up Marc Surer by 29 points. Giacomelli became the first Italian to win the European Formula Two Championship.

== Formula One ==
After his sole F1 race in 1977, Giacomelli entered five races in 1978 for McLaren, when his Formula Two commitments allowed. He achieved his best finish, of seventh place, in the 1978 British Grand Prix. After winning the European F2 title, he switched to Alfa Romeo for their return to building F1 cars in 1979. Alfa only entered their 177 and 179 cars in a handful of events that year, and Giacomelli could only achieve a best of 17th place in the 1979 French Grand Prix.

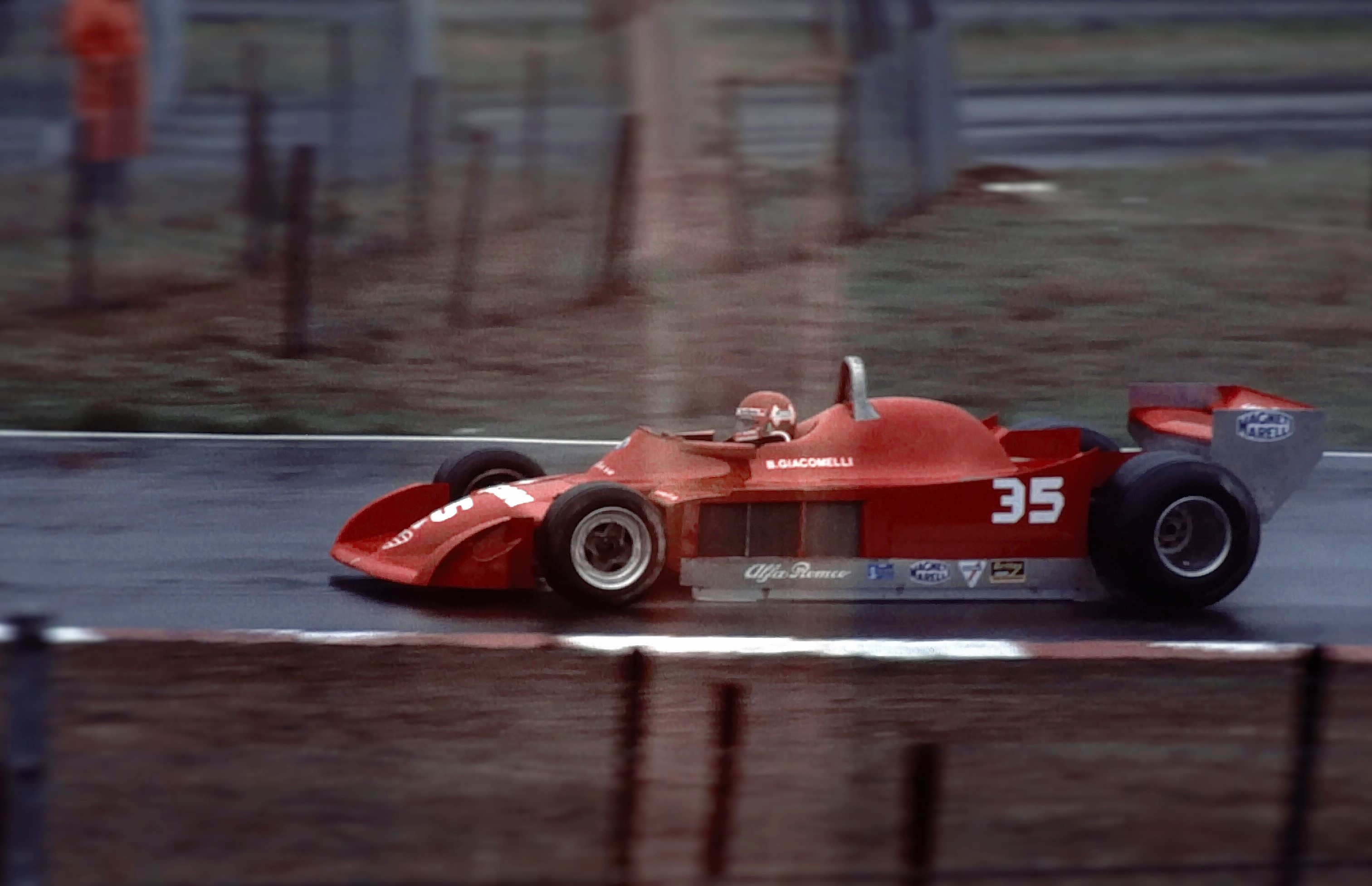
Giacomelli driving for Alfa Romeo at the 1979 Belgian Grand Prix.

However, in the following year, the team looked more promising. Giacomelli earned a surprise 6th place qualifying position for Alfa Romeo at Brands Hatch for the 1980 British Grand Prix. Giacomelli posted a third-place qualifying time for the 1980 Italian Grand Prix at Imola. Three of his six mechanics sustained injuries on the Friday before the race, when their helicopter crashed en route to the track. He won the pole position for the 1980 United States Grand Prix at Watkins Glen, New York in his Alfa Romeo. Giacomelli improved on his opening day time by 1.25 seconds, with a time of 1 minute 33.29 seconds over the 3.37-mile track. However, despite these flashes of speed Giacomelli only managed to finish three of the season's fourteen races due to crashes or mechanical breakdowns; although two of his finishes were fifth places at the season-opening 1980 Argentine Grand Prix and the 1980 German Grand Prix, thus netting him four points and placing him 16th in the Drivers' Championship.

In 1981, the car was somewhat more reliable, with Giacomelli being a classified finisher in eight of the season's 15 races - however he struggled to achieve good results until the end of the year, with a fourth and a third in the season-ending Canadian and Caesars Palace Grands Prix respectively - the latter was Giacomelli's only podium finish in F1, and he achieved his best-ever championship finish by ending up 15th in the drivers' standings.

For 1982, Alfa introduced their new Alfa Romeo 182 to replace the ageing 179; however, the new chassis proved to be unreliable in the first half of the season. In the second half, it was reliable enough to allow Giacomelli to finish all but two of the races; however, the year only yielded one points finish for him, with a fifth in Germany. Giacomelli was eliminated at the start of the 1982 Belgian Grand Prix at Zolder when his Alfa Romeo collided with the two ATS cars of Eliseo Salazar and Manfred Winkelhock. Alfa recruited Mauro Baldi to partner Andrea de Cesaris for the 1983 Formula One season and Giacomelli joined Toleman. Giacomelli was outperformed by his teammate Derek Warwick, though he did manage to pick up a final F1 point at the 1983 European Grand Prix at Brands Hatch.

Giacomelli was the test driver for the Leyton House March team in 1988 and 1989, as well as in 1990 in its Leyton House incarnation. He was offered a test driver position with McLaren for 1990 but turned it down.

In 1990, Giacomelli returned to F1 with the Life outfit, taking over from Gary Brabham (who left the team two races into the season). The car, saddled with an ineffectual and fragile W12 engine, struggled to get within 20 seconds of the pole time at many circuits, and Giacomelli failed to even get out of pre-qualifying at any of the 12 Grands Prix he contested with the team. At the Portuguese Grand Prix, the team reverted to a more conventional Judd V8 engine, but the car had not been adapted for the new engine and the team were unable to properly fit the engine cover, leading to them pulling out of the event without completing a single lap. When Giacomelli was able to drive the Judd-powered car in Spain, he found himself 18 seconds off the pace despite the new engine. With money in short supply and few hopes of improving their desperately noncompetitive package, the team folded before the final two races of the season, ending Giacomelli's F1 career.

== CART ==
Giacomelli made 11 starts in CART in 1984 and 1985, ten of which were for Patrick Racing. His best finish was a fifth place on the Meadowlands street course in 1985. He attempted but failed to qualify for the 1984 Indianapolis 500.

== Racing record ==
=== Career summary ===
| Season | Series | Team | Races | Wins | Poles | F/Laps | Podiums | Points | Position |
|---|---|---|---|---|---|---|---|---|---|
| 1974 | Formula Italia | | ? | 1 | ? | ? | ? | 0 | NC |
| 1975 | Formula Italia | Cevenini | ? | 5 | ? | ? | ? | 45 | **1st** |
| 1976 | BARC BP Super Visco British Formula Three | March Engineering | 12 | 5 | 5 | 4 | 9 | 71 | **2nd** |
| 1976 | BRDC Shellsport British Formula Three | March Engineering | 5 | 2 | 5 | ? | 5 | 79 | **1st** |
| 1976 | FIA European Formula 3 Championship | March Engineering | 1 | 0 | 0 | 0 | 0 | 0 | NC |
| 1977 | European Formula Two | AFMP Euroracing / March Engineering | 13 | 3 | 3 | 3 | 3 | 32 | 4th |
| 1977 | CASC Formula Atlantic | Ecurie Canada | 1 | 0 | 0 | 0 | 0 | 0 | NC |
| 1977 | Formula One | Marlboro Team McLaren | 1 | 0 | 0 | 0 | 0 | 0 | NC |
| 1978 | European Formula Two | Polifac BMW Junior Team | 12 | 8 | 8 | 6 | 10 | 78 | **1st** |
| 1978 | Formula One | Marlboro Team McLaren | 5 | 0 | 0 | 0 | 0 | 0 | NC |
| 1978 | Japanese Formula Two | | 1 | 0 | 1 | 1 | 0 | 0 | NC |
| 1979 | BMW M1 Procar Championship | Osella Squadra Corse | 8 | 0 | 0 | 0 | 1 | 6 | 19th |
| 1979 | Formula One | Autodelta | 4 | 0 | 0 | 0 | 0 | 0 | NC |
| 1980 | Formula One | Marlboro Team Alfa Romeo | 14 | 0 | 1 | 0 | 0 | 4 | 16th |
| 1981 | Formula One | Marlboro Team Alfa Romeo | 15 | 0 | 0 | 0 | 1 | 7 | 15th |
| 1982 | Formula One | Marlboro Team Alfa Romeo | 16 | 0 | 0 | 0 | 0 | 2 | 22nd |
| 1983 | Formula One | Candy Toleman Motorsport | 14 | 0 | 0 | 0 | 0 | 1 | 19th |
| 1984 | CART PPG Indy Car World Series | Theodore Racing | 1 | 0 | 0 | 0 | 0 | 5 | 32nd |
| 1984 | CART PPG Indy Car World Series | Patrick Racing | 1 | 0 | 0 | 0 | 0 | 5 | 32nd |
| 1985 | CART PPG Indy Car World Series | Patrick Racing | 9 | 0 | 0 | 0 | 0 | 32 | 19th |
| 1985 | World Sportscar Championship | Porsche Kremer Racing | 1 | 0 | 0 | 0 | 0 | 0 | NC‡ |
| 1986 | World Sportscar Championship | Sponsor Guest Team | 2 | 0 | 0 | 0 | 0 | 10 | 44th |
| 1986 | World Sportscar Championship | Porsche Kremer Racing | 2 | 0 | 0 | 0 | 0 | 10 | 44th |
| 1987 | World Touring Car Championship | Pro Team Italia/Imberti | 5 | 0 | 0 | 0 | 0 | 42 | 31st |
| 1987 | World Sportscar Championship | Britten – Lloyd Racing | 1 | 0 | 0 | 0 | 0 | 0 | NC |
| 1987 | World Sportscar Championship | Mussato Action Car | 1 | 0 | 0 | 0 | 0 | 0 | NC |
| 1988 | World Sportscar Championship | Porsche Kremer Racing | 4 | 0 | 0 | 0 | 0 | 20 | 37th |
| 1988 | All-Japan Sports Prototype Championship | Leyton House Racing | 2 | 1 | 0 | 0 | 1 | 30 | 10th |
| 1988 | 24 Hours of Le Mans | Kenwood Kremer Racing | 1 | 0 | 0 | 0 | 0 | N/A | 9th |
| 1989 | World Sportscar Championship | Mussato Action Car | 4 | 0 | 0 | 0 | 0 | 0 | NC |
| 1989 | World Sportscar Championship | Porsche Kremer Racing | 2 | 0 | 0 | 0 | 0 | 0 | NC |
| 1989 | 24 Hours of Le Mans | Porsche Kremer Racing | 1 | 0 | 0 | 0 | 0 | N/A | DNF |
| 1990 | World Sportscar Championship | Spice Engineering | 3 | 0 | 0 | 0 | 1 | 6 | 17th |
| 1990 | 24 Hours of Le Mans | Richard Lloyd Racing | 1 | 0 | 0 | 0 | 0 | N/A | 11th |
| 1990 | All-Japan Sports Prototype Championship | Davey Racing | 1 | 0 | 0 | 0 | 0 | 0 | NC |
| 1990 | Formula One | Life Racing Engines | 0 | 0 | 0 | 0 | 0 | 0 | NC |
| 1995 | BPR Global GT Series | Freisinger Motorsport | 3 | 0 | 0 | 0 | 0 | 15 | 115th |

^{‡} Not eligible for Championship points.

=== Complete European Formula Two Championship results ===
(key) (Races in bold indicate pole position; races in italics indicate fastest lap)

| Year | Entrant | Chassis | Engine | 1 | 2 | 3 | 4 | 5 | 6 | 7 | 8 | 9 | 10 | 11 | 12 | 13 | Pos. | Pts |
|---|---|---|---|---|---|---|---|---|---|---|---|---|---|---|---|---|---|---|
| 1977 | AFMP Euroracing | March 772 | Hart | SIL; Ret | THR; Ret | HOC; Ret | NÜR; 6 | | | | | | | | | | 4th | 32 |
| 1977 | March Engineering | March 772P | BMW | | | | | **VLL**; 1 | PAU; Ret | MUG; 1 | ROU; Ret | NOG; 4 | PER; 7 | **MIS**; 10 | EST; 14 | | 4th | 32 |
| 1977 | March Engineering | March 782 | BMW | | | | | | | | | | | | | **DON**; 1 | 4th | 32 |
| 1978 | Polifac BMW Junior Team | March 782 | BMW | **THR**; 1 | **HOC**; 1 | **NÜR**; Ret | PAU; 1 | **MUG**; 3 | **VLL**; 2 | **ROU**; 1 | **DON**; Ret | **NOG**; 1 | PER; 1 | MIS; 1 | HOC; 1 | | **1st** | **78** |

=== Complete Formula One results ===
(key) (Races in bold indicate pole position)

| Year | Entrant | Chassis | Engine | 1 | 2 | 3 | 4 | 5 | 6 | 7 | 8 | 9 | 10 | 11 | 12 | 13 | 14 | 15 | 16 | 17 | WDC | Pts |
|---|---|---|---|---|---|---|---|---|---|---|---|---|---|---|---|---|---|---|---|---|---|---|
| 1977 | Marlboro Team McLaren | McLaren M23E | Ford Cosworth DFV 3.0 V8 | ARG | BRA | RSA | USW | ESP | MON | BEL | SWE | FRA | GBR | GER | AUT | NED | ITA; Ret | USA | CAN | JPN | NC | 0 |
| 1978 | Marlboro Team McLaren | McLaren M26 | Ford Cosworth DFV 3.0 V8 | ARG | BRA | RSA | USW | MON | BEL; 8 | ESP | SWE | FRA; Ret | GBR; 7 | GER | AUT | NED; Ret | ITA; 14 | USA | CAN | | NC | 0 |
| 1979 | Autodelta | Alfa Romeo 177 | Alfa Romeo 115-12 3.0 F12 | ARG | BRA | RSA | USW | ESP | BEL; Ret | MON | FRA; 17 | GBR | GER | AUT | NED | | | | | | NC | 0 |
| 1979 | Autodelta | Alfa Romeo 179 | Alfa Romeo 1260 3.0 V12 | | | | | | | | | | | | | ITA; Ret | CAN | USA; Ret | | | NC | 0 |
| 1980 | Marlboro Team Alfa Romeo | Alfa Romeo 179 | Alfa Romeo 1260 3.0 V12 | ARG; 5 | BRA; 13 | RSA; Ret | USW; Ret | BEL; Ret | MON; Ret | FRA; Ret | GBR; Ret | GER; 5 | AUT; Ret | NED; Ret | ITA; Ret | CAN; Ret | **USA**; Ret | | | | 16th | 4 |
| 1981 | Marlboro Team Alfa Romeo | Alfa Romeo 179C | Alfa Romeo 1260 3.0 V12 | USW; Ret | BRA; NC | ARG; 10 | SMR; Ret | BEL; 9 | MON; Ret | ESP; 10 | | | | | | ITA; 8 | CAN; 4 | CPL; 3 | | | 15th | 7 |
| 1981 | Marlboro Team Alfa Romeo | Alfa Romeo 179B | Alfa Romeo 1260 3.0 V12 | | | | | | | | FRA; 15 | GBR; Ret | GER; 15 | AUT; Ret | NED; Ret | | | | | | 15th | 7 |
| 1982 | Marlboro Team Alfa Romeo | Alfa Romeo 179D | Alfa Romeo 1260 3.0 V12 | RSA; 11 | | | | | | | | | | | | | | | | | 22nd | 2 |
| 1982 | Marlboro Team Alfa Romeo | Alfa Romeo 182 | Alfa Romeo 1260 3.0 V12 | | BRA; Ret | USW; Ret | SMR; Ret | BEL; Ret | MON; Ret | DET; Ret | CAN; Ret | NED; 11 | GBR; 7 | FRA; 9 | GER; 5 | AUT; Ret | SUI; 12 | ITA; Ret | CPL; 10 | | 22nd | 2 |
| 1983 | Candy Toleman Motorsport | Toleman TG183B | Hart 415T 1.5 L4t | BRA; Ret | USW; Ret | FRA; 13 | SMR; Ret | MON; DNQ | BEL; 8 | DET; 9 | CAN; Ret | GBR; Ret | GER; Ret | AUT; Ret | NED; 13 | ITA; 7 | EUR; 6 | RSA; Ret | | | 19th | 1 |
| 1990 | Life Racing Engines | Life F190 | Life F35 3.5 W12 | USA | BRA | SMR; DNPQ | MON; DNPQ | CAN; DNPQ | MEX; DNPQ | FRA; DNPQ | GBR; DNPQ | GER; DNPQ | HUN; DNPQ | BEL; DNPQ | ITA; DNPQ | | | | | | NC | 0 |
| 1990 | Life Racing Engines | Life F190 | Judd CV 3.5 V8 | | | | | | | | | | | | | POR; DNPQ | ESP; DNPQ | JPN | AUS | | NC | 0 |

=== Complete BMW M1 Procar results ===
(key)

| Year | Entrant | Car | 1 | 2 | 3 | 4 | 5 | 6 | 7 | 8 | Pos. | Pts |
|---|---|---|---|---|---|---|---|---|---|---|---|---|
| 1979 | Osella Squadra Corse | BMW M1 | ZOL; Ret | MON; Ret | DIJ; 10 | SIL; Ret | HOC; 8 | ÖST; 9 | ZAN | MNZ; Ret | 19th | 6 |

=== American Open-Wheel racing ===
(key) (Races in bold indicate pole position)

==== CART PPG Indy Car World Series ====
| Year | Team | No. | Chassis | Engine | 1 | 2 | 3 | 4 | 5 | 6 | 7 | 8 | 9 | 10 | 11 | 12 | 13 | 14 | 15 | 16 | Pos. | Pts | Ref |
|---|---|---|---|---|---|---|---|---|---|---|---|---|---|---|---|---|---|---|---|---|---|---|---|
| 1984 | Theodore Racing | 44 | Theodore T83 | Cosworth DFX V8t | LBH; 27 | PHX; DNS | | | | | | | | | | | | | | | 32nd | 5 | |
| 1984 | Theodore Racing | 44 | Theodore T84 | Cosworth DFX V8t | | | INDY; DNQ | MIL | POR | MEA | CLE | MCH | ROA | POC | MDO | SAN | MCH | PHX | | | 32nd | 5 | |
| 1984 | Patrick Racing | 40 | March 84C | Cosworth DFX V8t | | | | | | | | | | | | | | | LAG; 8 | CPL | 32nd | 5 | |
| 1985 | Patrick Racing | 20 | March 85C | Cosworth DFX V8t | LBH; 18 | INDY | MIL | POR; 10 | MEA; 5 | CLE; 10 | MCH | ROA; 22 | POC | MDO; 6 | SAN; 16 | MCH | LAG; 6 | PHX | MIA; 14 | | 19th | 32 | |

=== Complete World Endurance/World Sports Prototype Championship results ===
(key) (Races in bold indicate pole position) (Races in italics indicate fastest lap)

| Year | Entrant | Class | Car | 1 | 2 | 3 | 4 | 5 | 6 | 7 | 8 | 9 | 10 | 11 | Pos. | Pts |
|---|---|---|---|---|---|---|---|---|---|---|---|---|---|---|---|---|
| 1985 | Porsche Kremer Racing | C1 | Porsche 956B | MUG | MNZ; 8 | SIL | LMS | HOC | MOS | SPA | BRH | FUJ | SHA | | NC | 0^{‡} |
| 1986 | Sponsor Guest Team | C1 | Lancia LC2 | MNZ | SIL | LMS | NOR; Ret | BRH; Ret | JER | NÜR | | | | | 44th | 10 |
| 1986 | Porsche Kremer Racing | C1 | Porsche 962C | | | | | | | | SPA; 12 | FUJ; 4 | | | 44th | 10 |
| 1987 | Britten – Lloyd Racing | C1 | Porsche 962C GTi | JAR | JER | MNZ; Ret | SIL | LMS | | | | | | | NC | 0 |
| 1987 | Mussato Action Car | C1 | Lancia LC2 | | | | | | NOR; DSQ | BRH | NÜR | SPA | FUJ | | NC | 0 |
| 1988 | Porsche Kremer Racing | C1 | Porsche 962C | JER | JAR | MNZ; 6 | SIL | | | | | | | | 37th | 20 |
| 1988 | Porsche Kremer Racing | C1 | Porsche 962-CK6 | | | | | LMS; 9 | BRN | BRH | NÜR; 10 | SPA | FUJ; 16 | SAN | 37th | 20 |
| 1989 | Porsche Kremer Racing | C1 | Porsche 962-CK6 | SUZ; Ret | DIJ; 18 | JAR | | | | | | | | | NC | 0 |
| 1989 | Mussato Action Car | C1 | Lancia LC2 | | | | BRH; Ret | NÜR; NC | DON; Ret | SPA; DSQ | MEX; Ret | | | | NC | 0 |
| 1990 | Spice Engineering | C | Spice SE90C | SUZ; Ret | | SIL; 3 | SPA | DIJ | NÜR | DON; 5 | CGV | MEX | | | 17th | 6 |
| 1990 | Team Lee-Davey | C | Porsche 962C | | MNZ; DSQ | | | | | | | | | | 17th | 6 |

^{‡} Not eligible for Championship points

=== 24 Hours of Le Mans results ===
| Year | Team | Co-Drivers | Car | Class | Laps | Pos. | Class Pos. |
|---|---|---|---|---|---|---|---|
| 1988 | (Germany) Kenwood Kremer Racing | (Japan) Kunimitsu Takahashi (Japan) Hideki Okada | Porsche 962CK6 | C1 | 370 | 9th | 9th |
| 1989 | (Germany) Porsche Kremer Racing | (Japan) Kunimitsu Takahashi (Italy) Giovanni Lavaggi | Porsche 962C | C1 | 303 | DNF | DNF |
| 1990 | (United Kingdom) Richard Lloyd Racing | (United Kingdom) John Watson (Canada) Allen Berg | Porsche 962C | C1 | 335 | 11th | 11th |

=== Complete World Touring Car Championship results ===
(key) (Races in bold indicate pole position; races in italics indicate fastest lap)

| Year | Entrant | Car | 1 | 2 | 3 | 4 | 5 | 6 | 7 | 8 | 9 | 10 | 11 | Pos. | Pts |
|---|---|---|---|---|---|---|---|---|---|---|---|---|---|---|---|
| 1987 | Pro Team Italia | Maserati Biturbo | MNZ; 17 | JAR; DNS | DIJ; Ret | NÜR; Ret | SPA | BRN; 24 | SIL | BAT | CLD | WEL | FUJ | 31st | 43 |

== Notes ==
Sporting positions
| Preceded by Renzo Zorzi | Monaco Formula Three; Race Winner; 1976 | Succeeded by Didier Pironi |
| Preceded by None | British Formula 3 Championship; BRDC Series Champion; 1976 | Succeeded by Stephen South |
| Preceded by René Arnoux | European Formula Two; Champion; 1978 | Succeeded by Marc Surer |
