= 1982 Caesars Palace Grand Prix =

- Race 16 of 16 in the 1982 Formula One World Championship
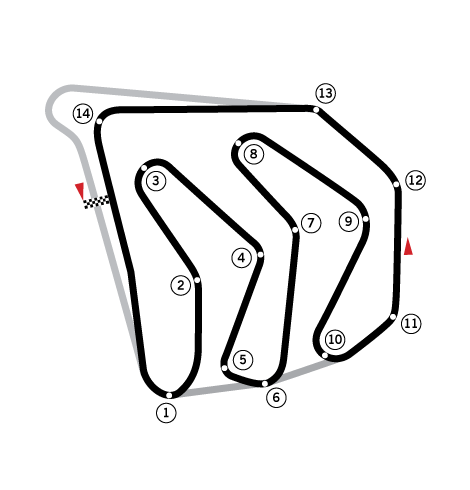

Race details
- Date: September 25, 1982
- Official name: 2nd Caesars Palace Grand Prix
- Location: Las Vegas Strip
- Course: Temporary street course
- Course length: 3.650 km (2.268 miles)
- Distance: 75 laps, 273.75 km (170.10 miles)
- Weather: Sunny with temperatures reaching up to 98.8 °F (37.1 °C); wind speeds approaching 18.1 miles per hour (29.1 km/h)

Pole position
Driver	(France) Alain Prost	Renault
- Time: 1:16.356

Fastest lap
Driver	(Italy) Michele Alboreto	Tyrrell-Ford
- Time: 1:19.639 on lap 59

Podium
First	(Italy) Michele Alboreto	Tyrrell-Ford
Second	(United Kingdom) John Watson	McLaren-Ford
Third	(United States) Eddie Cheever	Ligier-Matra

The 1982 Caesars Palace Grand Prix was a Formula One motor race held on September 25, 1982, in Las Vegas, Nevada. It was the sixteenth and final race of the 1982 Formula One World Championship, the second F1 race in Las Vegas, and the last F1 race to be held at Caesars Palace.

The 75-lap race was won by Michele Alboreto, driving a Tyrrell-Ford. Alboreto scored Tyrrell's first victory since the 1978 Monaco Grand Prix, becoming the eleventh different winning driver of 1982 while Tyrrell became the seventh different winning constructor. John Watson finished second in a McLaren-Ford, with Eddie Cheever third in a Ligier-Matra. Keke Rosberg finished fifth in his Williams-Ford to secure the Drivers' Championship, with Ferrari taking the Constructors' Championship despite neither car finishing in the top six.

This was the last F1 race for 1978 World Champion Mario Andretti and for Colin Chapman, the creator and manager of Lotus (who died of a heart attack at his home, later in December). It was also the last race for the Ensign and Fittipaldi teams, the last for March until 1987, and the last for Matra as an engine supplier. This would be last Grand Prix held in Las Vegas for just over 41 years until the 2023 Las Vegas Grand Prix held on a new circuit utilising the Las Vegas Strip.

== Background ==
When the 1982 Formula One schedule was first released in October 1981, the Caesars Palace Grand Prix was scheduled for Saturday, October 16, 1982.

In anticipation of the second year in Las Vegas, race organizers attempted to make the weekend even larger by also scheduling a CART Indy car race. The weekend would consist of a Can-Am race on Friday, the Formula One Grand Prix on Saturday, then the track would be converted to an oval for Indy cars on Sunday.

Shortly after CART announced their 1982 schedule confirming the Las Vegas race twin bill, the Fédération Internationale du Sport Automobile (FISA) announced the Caesars Palace Grand Prix would be moved to September 25. Jean-Marie Balestre, head of FISA, explained this was done to shorten the one-month wait between the Italian Grand Prix and the Caesars Palace Grand Prix. It was also done so the American television broadcaster, NBC, would not have a conflict with their coverage of the 1982 World Series being held the same weekend. This new date, however, was in conflict with CART's previously scheduled race at Michigan International Speedway. Furthermore, FISA prevented any future F1-IndyCar combination weekends by instituting a rule that banned two open-wheel series with engines over two liters from competing at the same venue on the same weekend.

In response, CART president John Frasco said, "I don't know all the politics, but it's pretty obvious FISA doesn't want to race with us... I didn't think we were competing against each other because we would be racing on track's different configurations. Caesars Palace thought the doubleheader concept was fascinating, so did Bernie Ecclestone, and so did we. But obviously, other people involved didn't feel that way."

== Qualifying report ==
For the first time since the World Championship began in 1950, a country hosted three rounds in the same season in 1982. The final race of the year, and the third in the US, would once again decide the Championship. Keke Rosberg of Williams had 42 points, to 33 for McLaren's John Watson, and needed to finish sixth or better to secure the title. Meanwhile, the race was former world champion Mario Andretti's final grand prix.

The course's tight turns and short straights allowed the non-turbo cars to be more competitive than usual, with Michele Alboreto's Tyrrell and Eddie Cheever's Talbot Ligier fastest among them. The turbocharged Renaults of Alain Prost and René Arnoux took first and second positions in qualifying, more than eight-tenths clear of Alboreto. The two Championship contenders, Rosberg and Watson, meanwhile, were in sixth and ninth places respectively, separated by the Ferraris of Mario Andretti and Patrick Tambay.

== Championship permutations ==
Rosberg and Watson both entered this race with a chance of winning the Drivers' Championship.

- Rosberg (42 points) needed either
  - 6th or higher
  - Watson 2nd or lower
- Watson (33 points) needed to win the race, with Rosberg 7th or lower. Had this happened, both drivers would have finished with 42 points, and Watson would have been champion by virtue of having three wins to Rosberg's one.
- The injured Didier Pironi exited championship contention before the race on the grounds of being absent from the event.

For the first time since 1964, three teams entered the final race with a chance of winning the Constructors' Championship.

- Ferrari (74 points) needed either
  - 2nd (or 4th and 5th) or better
  - 4th (or 5th and 6th) or better, with the McLarens 1st and 3rd or lower
  - 5th or better, with the McLarens 1st and 4th or lower
  - 6th or better, with the McLarens 1st and 5th or lower
  - the McLarens scoring fewer than 11 points, with the Renaults 1st and 3rd or lower
- McLaren-Ford (63 points) needed 1st and either
  - 2nd with the Ferraris scoring fewer than 5 points
  - 3rd with the Ferraris scoring fewer than 3 points
  - 4th with the Ferraris 6th or lower
  - 5th with the Ferraris 7th or lower
- Renault (59 points) needed 1st and 2nd, with the Ferraris 7th or lower. Had this happened, both teams would have finished with 74 points, with Renault then winning by virtue of having five wins to Ferrari's three.

== Race report ==
At the green light for the race on Saturday, Prost led from the pole, followed by teammate Arnoux. Cheever, from the fourth spot on the grid, was determined to get around the outside of Alboreto on the first left-hander. They touched wheels, but both continued with Alboreto still in front, Cheever's Ligier sporting a vibrating front wheel and the Tyrrell of Alboreto bearing a tire mark on the right sidepod.

For the first ten laps, the Renaults steadily pulled away from Alboreto, with Arnoux now leading Prost. The Tyrrell began to match Arnoux's times, however, and then to close on him, as Prost took back the lead on lap 15. Speculation of a problem with Arnoux's car proved true, as the Renault was faltering, and he retired on lap 21.

Watson, meanwhile, had dropped to twelfth in the opening laps, but passed Piquet on lap 12, then Rosberg, Andretti and Cheever on successive laps, eventually reaching third place, with a thirty-second gap to the two leaders. However, when Andretti, hoping to help clinch the Constructors' title for Ferrari, slid off directly in front of Rosberg on lap 27 with a broken rear suspension link, Rosberg took over the fifth place he sought.

Among the leaders, Alboreto began inching closer to Prost again, and Watson continued to close on both of them. Niki Lauda's McLaren retired on lap 54, while Alboreto had eliminated the gap to Prost, and gotten by him to take the lead in a Grand Prix for the first time. Prost's tires were picking up rubber and had developed a vibration. In four more laps, Watson had also caught and passed him, but he was having the same problem as Prost, and so could make no progress on Alboreto.

Alboreto cruised to a comfortable victory, his first ever and the first for Tyrrell in four years. Alboreto was the 11th different victor that year. Cheever was also able to overtake the ailing Prost for third, nine laps from the end. Less than three seconds behind Prost, and the last car on the lead lap, was Rosberg, who therefore won the world title. Ferrari won the Constructors' Championship despite not finishing in the points.

This race also was marked the end of the engine's 14-year dominance of Ford Cosworth engine (of normal combustion), since the 1968 with Lotus and Graham Hill, being increasingly superseded by the turbocharged engines of the time.

== Classification ==
=== Qualifying ===
Pos	No	Driver	Constructor	Q1	Q2	Gap
1	15	(France) Alain Prost	Renault	1:18.922	1:16.356	
2	16	(France) René Arnoux	Renault	1:17.868	1:16.786	+0.430
3	3	(Italy) Michele Alboreto	Tyrrell-Ford	1:18.756	1:17.646	+1.290
4	25	(United States) Eddie Cheever	Ligier-Matra	1:18.842	1:17.683	+1.327
5	2	(Italy) Riccardo Patrese	Brabham-BMW	1:20.386	1:17.772	+1.416
6	6	(Finland) Keke Rosberg	Williams-Ford	1:19.162	1:17.886	+1.530
7	28	(United States) Mario Andretti	Ferrari	1:19.246	1:17.921	+1.565
8	27	(France) Patrick Tambay	Ferrari	1:21.067	1:17.958	+1.602
9	7	(United Kingdom) John Watson	McLaren-Ford	1:19.320	1:17.986	+1.630
10	35	(United Kingdom) Derek Warwick	Toleman-Hart	1:20.181	1:18.012	+1.656
11	26	(France) Jacques Laffite	Ligier-Matra	1:19.635	1:18.056	+1.700
12	1	(Brazil) Nelson Piquet	Brabham-BMW	1:19.210	1:18.275	+1.919
13	8	(Austria) Niki Lauda	McLaren-Ford	1:19.171	1:18.333	+1.977
14	5	(Republic of Ireland) Derek Daly	Williams-Ford	1:19.808	1:18.418	+2.062
15	14	(Colombia) Roberto Guerrero	Ensign-Ford	1:20.516	1:18.496	+2.140
16	23	(Italy) Bruno Giacomelli	Alfa Romeo	1:20.065	1:18.622	+2.266
17	29	(Switzerland) Marc Surer	Arrows-Ford	1:19.764	1:18.734	+2.378
18	22	(Italy) Andrea de Cesaris	Alfa Romeo	1:19.728	1:18.761	+2.405
19	4	(United Kingdom) Brian Henton	Tyrrell-Ford	1:21.038	1:18.765	+2.409
20	31	(France) Jean-Pierre Jarier	Osella-Ford	1:19.222	no time	+2.866
21	11	(Italy) Elio de Angelis	Lotus-Ford	1:19.564	1:19.302	+2.946
22	12	(United Kingdom) Nigel Mansell	Lotus-Ford	1:20.986	1:19.439	+3.083
23	9	(West Germany) Manfred Winkelhock	ATS-Ford	1:21.563	1:19.767	+3.411
24	30	(Italy) Mauro Baldi	Arrows-Ford	1:20.271	1:20.824	+3.915
25	18	(Brazil) Raul Boesel	March-Ford	1:20.766	1:21.215	+4.410
26	17	(United Kingdom) Rupert Keegan	March-Ford	1:26.048	1:21.180	+4.824
27	33	(Republic of Ireland) Tommy Byrne	Theodore-Ford	1:24.208	1:21.555	+5.199
28	36	(Italy) Teo Fabi	Toleman-Hart	1:22.324	1:21.569	+5.213
29	10	(Chile) Eliseo Salazar	ATS-Ford	1:23.148	1:21.583	+5.227
30	20	(Brazil) Chico Serra	Fittipaldi-Ford	1:23.100	1:22.387	+6.031

=== Race ===
Pos	No	Driver	Constructor	Tyre	Laps	Time/Retired	Grid	Points
1	3	(Italy) Michele Alboreto	Tyrrell-Ford	G	75	1:41:56.888	3	9
2	7	(United Kingdom) John Watson	McLaren-Ford	MI	75	+ 27.292	9	6
3	25	(United States) Eddie Cheever	Ligier-Matra	MI	75	+ 56.450	4	4
4	15	(France) Alain Prost	Renault	MI	75	+ 1:08.648	1	3
5	6	(Finland) Keke Rosberg	Williams-Ford	G	75	+ 1:11.375	6	2
6	5	(Republic of Ireland) Derek Daly	Williams-Ford	G	74	+ 1 Lap	14	1
7	29	(Switzerland) Marc Surer	Arrows-Ford	P	74	+ 1 Lap	17	
8	4	(United Kingdom) Brian Henton	Tyrrell-Ford	G	74	+ 1 Lap	19	
9	22	(Italy) Andrea de Cesaris	Alfa Romeo	MI	73	+ 2 Laps	18	
10	23	(Italy) Bruno Giacomelli	Alfa Romeo	MI	73	+ 2 Laps	16	
11	30	(Italy) Mauro Baldi	Arrows-Ford	P	73	+ 2 Laps	23	
12	17	(United Kingdom) Rupert Keegan	March-Ford	MI	73	+ 2 Laps	25	
13	18	(Brazil) Raul Boesel	March-Ford	MI	69	+ 6 Laps	24	
NC	9	(West Germany) Manfred Winkelhock	ATS-Ford	MI	62	+ 13 Laps	22	
Ret	8	(Austria) Niki Lauda	McLaren-Ford	MI	53	Engine	13	
Ret	33	(Republic of Ireland) Tommy Byrne	Theodore-Ford	G	39	Spun Off	26	
Ret	35	(United Kingdom) Derek Warwick	Toleman-Hart	P	32	Spark Plugs	10	
Ret	11	(Italy) Elio de Angelis	Lotus-Ford	G	28	Engine	20	
Ret	28	(United States) Mario Andretti	Ferrari	G	26	Suspension	7	
Ret	1	(Brazil) Nelson Piquet	Brabham-BMW	G	26	Spark Plugs	12	
Ret	16	(France) René Arnoux	Renault	MI	20	Engine	2	
Ret	2	(Italy) Riccardo Patrese	Brabham-BMW	G	17	Clutch	5	
Ret	12	(United Kingdom) Nigel Mansell	Lotus-Ford	G	8	Collision	21	
Ret	26	(France) Jacques Laffite	Ligier-Matra	MI	5	Ignition	11	
DNS	27	(France) Patrick Tambay	Ferrari	G	0	Driver Unfit	8	
DNS	14	(Colombia) Roberto Guerrero	Ensign-Ford	MI	0	Engine	15	
DNS	31	(France) Jean-Pierre Jarier	Osella-Ford	P				
DNQ	36	(Italy) Teo Fabi	Toleman-Hart	P				
DNQ	10	(Chile) Eliseo Salazar	ATS-Ford	MI				
DNQ	20	(Brazil) Chico Serra	Fittipaldi-Ford	P				

== Notes ==
- This was the 50th Grand Prix start for an Irish driver.

== Final championship standings after the race ==
Drivers' Championship standings

Pos	Driver	Points
1	(Finland) Keke Rosberg	44
2	(France) Didier Pironi	39
3	(United Kingdom) John Watson	39
4	(France) Alain Prost	34
5	(Austria) Niki Lauda	30

Constructors' Championship standings

Pos	Constructor	Points
1	(Italy) Ferrari	74
2	(United Kingdom) McLaren-Ford	69
3	(France) Renault	62
4	(United Kingdom) Williams-Ford	58
5	(United Kingdom) Lotus-Ford	30

- Note: Only the top five positions are included for both sets of standings.

Previous race: 1982 Italian Grand Prix	FIA Formula One World Championship; 1982 season	Next race: 1983 Brazilian Grand Prix
Previous race: 1981 Caesars Palace Grand Prix	Caesars Palace Grand Prix	Next race: 1983 Caesars Palace Grand Prix (CART); Next F1 race in Las Vegas: 2023 Las Vegas Grand Prix
