= 1981 Austrian Grand Prix =

- Race 11 of 15 in the 1981 Formula One World Championship
- The Österreichring Circuit (1977-1987)

Race details
- Date: 16 August 1981
- Official name: XIX Großer Preis von Osterreich
- Location: Österreichring; Spielberg, Styria, Austria
- Course: Permanent racing facility
- Course length: 5.942 km (3.692 miles)
- Distance: 53 laps, 314.926 km (195.686 miles)
- Weather: Mild, Dry

Pole position
Driver	(France) René Arnoux	Renault
- Time: 1:32.018

Fastest lap
Driver	(France) Jacques Laffite	Talbot Ligier-Matra
- Time: 1:37.62 on lap 47

Podium
First	(France) Jacques Laffite	Talbot Ligier-Matra
Second	(France) René Arnoux	Renault
Third	(Brazil) Nelson Piquet	Brabham-Ford

The 1981 Austrian Grand Prix was a Formula One motor race held at Österreichring on 16 August 1981. It was the eleventh race of the 1981 Formula One World Championship.

The 53-lap race was won by Frenchman Jacques Laffite, driving a Talbot Ligier-Matra. Compatriot René Arnoux finished second in a Renault, having started from pole position, with Brazilian Nelson Piquet third in a Brabham-Ford. Piquet moved to within six points of Drivers' Championship leader, Argentine Carlos Reutemann, who finished fifth in his Williams-Ford.

== Report ==
=== Qualifying ===
In qualifying, just like the previous year, it was an all-French front row; René Arnoux planted his turbocharged Renault on pole, alongside his teammate Alain Prost. Next was Gilles Villeneuve in his turbocharged Ferrari, Jacques Laffite in the Talbot Ligier, Carlos Reutemann and Alan Jones in the Williams cars were 5th and 6th, then Nelson Piquet in a Brabham and then Didier Pironi in the other turbocharged Ferrari.

The Fittipaldi team was not present because they did not have enough engines.

=== Race ===
At the start, Villeneuve got the jump on the two Renaults and led into the Hella-Licht chicane. On the next lap, Prost passed Villeneuve into the Hella-Licht; Villeneuve tried to outbrake Prost but he locked up solid and went into some runoff area; as did Reutemann. Both the Canadian and Argentine drivers were able to rejoin, but with time lost.

At the high-speed Österreichring, a power advantage paid dividends. Prost and Arnoux were able to pull away from the rest of the field. Around lap 4, Pironi (who had made a lightning start from 8th on the grid) was running 3rd, and Laffite, Piquet, Jones and eventually Reutemann had caught up to Pironi. None of them could find a way past, and were held up by Pironi for a number of laps. In a similar situation to the Spanish Grand Prix earlier in the year, the Ferrari had more power than any of the cars behind it did, but its handling was way worse; so they were able to stay with the Ferrari. The 5 drivers battled it out, with Piquet, Laffite, Jones and Reutemann keeping with and desperately trying to find a way past Pironi, but not being able to because of the Ferrari's power pulling away on the straights; made more difficult by the fact that the scenic Österreichring was made up almost entirely of long corners and straights.

Villeneuve crashed heavily at the Bosch-Kurve on lap 12, and finally, Laffite, having already passed Piquet, managed to outbrake Pironi into the first of the Texaco bends, and then the rest of the three drivers got by as well. Prost retired from the lead with damaged suspension, and Laffite then charged after Arnoux, passing him at the second of the 2 Texaco Bends. Laffite was to hold the lead until the end, and the poor performance of the Ferrari in relation to other cars meant that Pironi managed to hold up more cars.

Laffite crossed the line, followed by Arnoux, Piquet, Jones, Reutemann (who coasted over the finish line with a dead engine) and John Watson in the carbon-fibre McLaren.

== Classification ==
=== Qualifying ===
Pos	No	Driver	Constructor	Q1	Q2	Gap
1	16	(France) René Arnoux	Renault	1:32.682	1:32.018	—
2	15	(France) Alain Prost	Renault	1:32.798	1:32.321	+0.303
3	27	(Canada) Gilles Villeneuve	Ferrari	1:33.334	1:35.150	+1.316
4	26	(France) Jacques Laffite	Talbot Ligier-Matra	1:35.002	1:34.398	+2.380
5	2	(Argentina) Carlos Reutemann	Williams-Ford	1:34.531	1:35.633	+2.513
6	1	(Australia) Alan Jones	Williams-Ford	1:34.654	1:34.999	+2.636
7	5	(Brazil) Nelson Piquet	Brabham-Ford	1:34.871	1:35.519	+2.853
8	28	(France) Didier Pironi	Ferrari	1:35.346	1:35.037	+3.019
9	11	(Italy) Elio de Angelis	Lotus-Ford	1:35.294	1:35.858	+3.276
10	29	(Italy) Riccardo Patrese	Arrows-Ford	1:35.912	1:35.442	+3.424
11	12	(United Kingdom) Nigel Mansell	Lotus-Ford	1:36.688	1:35.569	+3.551
12	7	(United Kingdom) John Watson	McLaren-Ford	1:36.007	1:35.977	+3.959
13	22	(United States) Mario Andretti	Alfa Romeo	1:36.560	1:36.079	+4.061
14	32	(France) Jean-Pierre Jarier	Osella-Ford	1:38.004	1:36.117	+4.099
15	6	(Mexico) Héctor Rebaque	Brabham-Ford	1:36.511	1:36.150	+4.132
16	23	(Italy) Bruno Giacomelli	Alfa Romeo	1:37.637	1:36.216	+4.198
17	25	(France) Patrick Tambay	Talbot Ligier-Matra	1:36.233	1:36.443	+4.215
18	8	(Italy) Andrea de Cesaris	McLaren-Ford	1:36.657	no time	+4.639
19	17	(Republic of Ireland) Derek Daly	March-Ford	1:37.777	1:37.230	+5.212
20	14	(Chile) Eliseo Salazar	Ensign-Ford	1:38.273	1:37.631	+5.613
21	9	(Sweden) Slim Borgudd	ATS-Ford	1:38.529	1:37.709	+5.691
22	4	(Italy) Michele Alboreto	Tyrrell-Ford	1:39.674	1:38.084	+6.066
23	33	(Switzerland) Marc Surer	Theodore-Ford	1:38.522	1:44.262	+6.504
24	30	(Italy) Siegfried Stohr	Arrows-Ford	1:38.616	1:38.546	+6.528
25	3	(United States) Eddie Cheever	Tyrrell-Ford	1:38.583	1:39.351	+6.565
26	36	(United Kingdom) Derek Warwick	Toleman-Hart	1:40.391	1:38.593	+6.575
27	35	(United Kingdom) Brian Henton	Toleman-Hart	1:39.987	1:38.691	+6.673
28	31	(Italy) Beppe Gabbiani	Osella-Ford	1:41.198	1:46.079	+9.180
WD	20	(Finland) Keke Rosberg	Fittipaldi-Ford	—	—	—
WD	21	(Brazil) Chico Serra	Fittipaldi-Ford	—	—	—

=== Race ===
Pos	No	Driver	Constructor	Tyre	Laps	Time/Retired	Grid	Points
1	26	(France) Jacques Laffite	Talbot Ligier-Matra	MI	53	1:27:36.47	4	9
2	16	(France) René Arnoux	Renault	MI	53	+ 5.17	1	6
3	5	(Brazil) Nelson Piquet	Brabham-Ford	G	53	+ 7.34	7	4
4	1	(Australia) Alan Jones	Williams-Ford	G	53	+ 12.04	6	3
5	2	(Argentina) Carlos Reutemann	Williams-Ford	G	53	+ 31.85	5	2
6	7	(United Kingdom) John Watson	McLaren-Ford	MI	53	+ 1:31.14	12	1
7	11	(Italy) Elio de Angelis	Lotus-Ford	G	52	+ 1 Lap	9	
8	8	(Italy) Andrea de Cesaris	McLaren-Ford	MI	52	+ 1 Lap	18	
9	28	(France) Didier Pironi	Ferrari	MI	52	+ 1 Lap	8	
10	32	(France) Jean-Pierre Jarier	Osella-Ford	MI	51	+ 2 Laps	14	
11	17	(Republic of Ireland) Derek Daly	March-Ford	A	47	+ 6 Laps	19	
Ret	22	(United States) Mario Andretti	Alfa Romeo	MI	46	Engine	13	
Ret	9	(Sweden) Slim Borgudd	ATS-Ford	A	44	Brakes	21	
Ret	29	(Italy) Riccardo Patrese	Arrows-Ford	P	43	Engine	10	
Ret	14	(Chile) Eliseo Salazar	Ensign-Ford	A	43	Oil Pressure	20	
Ret	4	(Italy) Michele Alboreto	Tyrrell-Ford	A	40	Gearbox	22	
Ret	23	(Italy) Bruno Giacomelli	Alfa Romeo	MI	35	Fire	16	
Ret	6	(Mexico) Héctor Rebaque	Brabham-Ford	G	32	Clutch	15	
Ret	30	(Italy) Siegfried Stohr	Arrows-Ford	P	27	Overheating	24	
Ret	15	(France) Alain Prost	Renault	MI	26	Suspension	2	
Ret	25	(France) Patrick Tambay	Talbot Ligier-Matra	MI	26	Engine	17	
Ret	12	(United Kingdom) Nigel Mansell	Lotus-Ford	G	23	Engine	11	
Ret	27	(Canada) Gilles Villeneuve	Ferrari	MI	11	Accident	3	
Ret	33	(Switzerland) Marc Surer	Theodore-Ford	MI	0	Distributor	23	
DNQ	3	(United States) Eddie Cheever	Tyrrell-Ford	G				
DNQ	36	(United Kingdom) Derek Warwick	Toleman-Hart	P				
DNQ	35	(United Kingdom) Brian Henton	Toleman-Hart	P				
DNQ	31	(Italy) Beppe Gabbiani	Osella-Ford	MI				

== Notes ==
- This was the 5th Grand Prix start for a Chilean driver.

== Championship standings after the race ==
Drivers' Championship standings

Pos	Driver	Points
1	(Argentina) Carlos Reutemann	45
2	(Brazil) Nelson Piquet	39
3	(France) Jacques Laffite	34
4	(Australia) Alan Jones	27
5	(Canada) Gilles Villeneuve	21

Constructors' Championship standings

Pos	Constructor	Points
1	(United Kingdom) Williams-Ford	72
2	(United Kingdom) Brabham-Ford	47
3	(France) Talbot Ligier-Matra	34
4	(France) Renault	30
5	(Italy) Ferrari	28

- Note: Only the top five positions are included for both sets of standings.

Previous race: 1981 German Grand Prix	FIA Formula One World Championship; 1981 season	Next race: 1981 Dutch Grand Prix
Previous race: 1980 Austrian Grand Prix	Austrian Grand Prix	Next race: 1982 Austrian Grand Prix
