= 1982 Austrian Grand Prix =

- Race 13 of 16 in the 1982 Formula One World Championship
- The Österreichring (last modified in 1977)

Race details
- Date: 15 August 1982
- Official name: XX Holiday Großer Preis von Österreich
- Location: Österreichring, Spielberg, Styria, Austria
- Course: Permanent racing facility
- Course length: 5.942 km (3.692 miles)
- Distance: 53 laps, 314.926 km (195.686 miles)
- Weather: Sunny, hot

Pole position
Driver	(Brazil) Nelson Piquet	Brabham-BMW
- Time: 1:27.612

Fastest lap
Driver	(Brazil) Nelson Piquet	Brabham-BMW
- Time: 1:33.699 on lap 5

Podium
First	(Italy) Elio de Angelis	Lotus-Ford
Second	(Finland) Keke Rosberg	Williams-Ford
Third	(France) Jacques Laffite	Ligier-Matra

The 1982 Austrian Grand Prix was a Formula One motor race held at Österreichring on 15 August 1982. It was the thirteenth race of the 1982 Formula One World Championship.

The 53-lap race was won by Italian driver Elio de Angelis, driving a Lotus-Ford. De Angelis held off Finland's Keke Rosberg in the Williams-Ford to win by just 0.05 seconds, or less than half a car length, claiming the first victory for Lotus since the 1978 Dutch Grand Prix and the last in the lifetime of team founder Colin Chapman, who died at the end of 1982. Frenchman Jacques Laffite finished third in a Ligier-Matra, one lap behind.

== Report ==
A chicane had been added at the entrance to the pits earlier in the year. Nelson Piquet's Brabham led into the first corner from pole position, while Renault's Alain Prost passed Piquet's team-mate Riccardo Patrese for second. Further back, there was a collision which eliminated the two Alfa Romeos of Andrea de Cesaris and Bruno Giacomelli, as well as the Williams of Derek Daly. Prost's advantage over Patrese lasted only a few corners before the Italian re-passed him. On lap 2, Patrick Tambay punctured the right rear tyre on his Ferrari, Michele Alboreto crashed his Tyrrell at the Bosch Kurve, Patrese took the lead from Piquet and the two Brabhams immediately began to pull away on their half-full tanks.

Shortly before half distance, Piquet made the first planned mid-race fuel and tyre pit stop in modern F1 history. He rejoined in fourth place, behind Prost and Elio de Angelis, and just ahead of Keke Rosberg. Shortly afterwards, Patrese made his stop, having built up a sufficient lead to rejoin the race still in first place. However, the Italian suffered an engine failure three laps later, leaving Prost to inherit a comfortable lead from de Angelis.

Piquet was back up to third but was now in trouble, unable to make any inroads into the leaders and struggling to stay ahead of Rosberg. On lap 32, the Brazilian retired with an electrical failure. Free of the Brabham, Rosberg began closing in on de Angelis, who at this point was ten seconds ahead.

Prost was leading by half a minute when on lap 49, five from the end, his Renault suffered a mechanical failure. This left de Angelis and Rosberg – neither of whom had won a Grand Prix before – battling for the lead. At the start of the last lap de Angelis was 1.6 seconds ahead. Rosberg closed rapidly on the final tour and was right on the Lotus's gearbox heading into the final corner, the Rindt Kurve. De Angelis calmly defended the inside line, but slid wide on the exit of the corner. Rosberg dived inside on the home straight, only to come up short by 0.050 seconds, or less than half a car length.

De Angelis joyfully celebrated his maiden win, while Rosberg had nonetheless boosted his Driver's Championship chances, moving into second place ahead of John Watson, who had suffered an engine failure. Ligier's Jacques Laffite completed the podium, coming home a lap down, while Patrick Tambay was fourth in the sole Ferrari, having recovered from a puncture early in the race. Watson's McLaren team-mate Niki Lauda was fifth, with Mauro Baldi taking the final point in his Arrows.

This was the 150th World Championship race victory for the Cosworth DFV engine. However, it was also to be the last hailed by Colin Chapman's famous act of throwing his cloth cap into the air after a Lotus victory, as Chapman would die four months later. It was also the last win by a Chapman-built Lotus, and the team's last win until the 1985 Portuguese Grand Prix.

== Classification ==
=== Qualifying ===
Pos	No	Driver	Constructor	Q1	Q2	Gap
1	1	(Brazil) Nelson Piquet	Brabham-BMW	1:27.612	1:28.398	—
2	2	(Italy) Riccardo Patrese	Brabham-BMW	1:27.971	1:28.296	+0.359
3	15	(France) Alain Prost	Renault	1:29.867	1:28.864	+1.252
4	27	(France) Patrick Tambay	Ferrari	1:29.522	1:29.856	+1.910
5	16	(France) René Arnoux	Renault	no time	1:30.261	+2.649
6	6	(Finland) Keke Rosberg	Williams-Ford	1:31.108	1:30.300	+2.688
7	11	(Italy) Elio de Angelis	Lotus-Ford	1:32.686	1:31.626	+4.014
8	3	(Italy) Michele Alboreto	Tyrrell-Ford	1:31.814	1:34.534	+4.202
9	5	(Republic of Ireland) Derek Daly	Williams-Ford	1:34.114	1:32.062	+4.450
10	8	(Austria) Niki Lauda	McLaren-Ford	1:33.005	1:32.131	+4.519
11	22	(Italy) Andrea de Cesaris	Alfa Romeo	1:33.353	1:32.308	+4.696
12	12	(United Kingdom) Nigel Mansell	Lotus-Ford	1:34.070	1:32.881	+5.269
13	23	(Italy) Bruno Giacomelli	Alfa Romeo	1:34.431	1:32.950	+5.338
14	26	(France) Jacques Laffite	Ligier-Matra	1:34.530	1:32.957	+5.345
15	35	(United Kingdom) Derek Warwick	Toleman-Hart	1:33.878	1:33.208	+5.596
16	14	(Colombia) Roberto Guerrero	Ensign-Ford	1:34.796	1:33.555	+5.943
17	36	(Italy) Teo Fabi	Toleman-Hart	1:34.690	1:33.971	+6.359
18	7	(United Kingdom) John Watson	McLaren-Ford	1:34.668	1:34.164	+6.554
19	4	(United Kingdom) Brian Henton	Tyrrell-Ford	1:34.184	1:36.228	+6.572
20	20	(Brazil) Chico Serra	Fittipaldi-Ford	1:35.724	1:34.187	+6.575
21	29	(Switzerland) Marc Surer	Arrows-Ford	1:34.422	1:34.579	+6.810
22	25	(United States) Eddie Cheever	Ligier-Matra	1:34.620	1:34.815	+7.008
23	30	(Italy) Mauro Baldi	Arrows-Ford	1:35.653	1:34.715	+7.103
24	17	(United Kingdom) Rupert Keegan	March-Ford	1:36.274	1:34.770	+7.158
25	9	(West Germany) Manfred Winkelhock	ATS-Ford	1:35.666	1:34.984	+7.372
26	33	(Republic of Ireland) Tommy Byrne	Theodore-Ford	1:35.318	1:34.985	+7.373
27	18	(Brazil) Raul Boesel	March-Ford	1:35.149	1:35.654	+7.537
28	31	(France) Jean-Pierre Jarier	Osella-Ford	1:35.622	1:35.206	+7.594
29	10	(Chile) Eliseo Salazar	ATS-Ford	1:35.581	1:35.271	+7.659

=== Race ===
Pos	No	Driver	Constructor	Tyre	Laps	Time/Retired	Grid	Points
1	11	(Italy) Elio de Angelis	Lotus-Ford	G	53	1:25:02.212	7	9
2	6	(Finland) Keke Rosberg	Williams-Ford	G	53	+ 0.050	6	6
3	26	(France) Jacques Laffite	Ligier-Matra	MI	52	+ 1 Lap	14	4
4	27	(France) Patrick Tambay	Ferrari	G	52	+ 1 Lap	4	3
5	8	(Austria) Niki Lauda	McLaren-Ford	MI	52	+ 1 Lap	10	2
6	30	(Italy) Mauro Baldi	Arrows-Ford	P	52	+ 1 Lap	23	1
7	20	(Brazil) Chico Serra	Fittipaldi-Ford	P	51	+ 2 Laps	20	
8	15	(France) Alain Prost	Renault	MI	48	Injection	3	
Ret	7	(United Kingdom) John Watson	McLaren-Ford	MI	44	Engine	18	
Ret	4	(United Kingdom) Brian Henton	Tyrrell-Ford	G	32	Engine	19	
Ret	1	(Brazil) Nelson Piquet	Brabham-BMW	G	31	Electrical	1	
Ret	33	(Republic of Ireland) Tommy Byrne	Theodore-Ford	G	28	Spun off	26	
Ret	29	(Switzerland) Marc Surer	Arrows-Ford	P	28	Engine	21	
Ret	2	(Italy) Riccardo Patrese	Brabham-BMW	G	27	Engine	2	
Ret	25	(United States) Eddie Cheever	Ligier-Matra	MI	22	Engine	22	
Ret	12	(United Kingdom) Nigel Mansell	Lotus-Ford	G	17	Engine	12	
Ret	16	(France) René Arnoux	Renault	MI	16	Injection	5	
Ret	9	(West Germany) Manfred Winkelhock	ATS-Ford	MI	15	Spun off	25	
Ret	35	(United Kingdom) Derek Warwick	Toleman-Hart	P	7	Suspension	15	
Ret	36	(Italy) Teo Fabi	Toleman-Hart	P	7	Transmission	17	
Ret	14	(Colombia) Roberto Guerrero	Ensign-Ford	MI	6	Spun off	16	
Ret	3	(Italy) Michele Alboreto	Tyrrell-Ford	G	1	Spun off	8	
Ret	17	(United Kingdom) Rupert Keegan	March-Ford	A	1	Steering	24	
Ret	5	(Republic of Ireland) Derek Daly	Williams-Ford	G	0	Collision	9	
Ret	22	(Italy) Andrea de Cesaris	Alfa Romeo	MI	0	Collision	11	
Ret	23	(Italy) Bruno Giacomelli	Alfa Romeo	MI	0	Collision	13	
DNQ	18	(Brazil) Raul Boesel	March-Ford	A				
DNQ	31	(France) Jean-Pierre Jarier	Osella-Ford	P				
DNQ	10	(Chile) Eliseo Salazar	ATS-Ford	MI				

== Championship standings after the race ==
Drivers' Championship standings

Pos	Driver	Points
1	(France) Didier Pironi	39
2	(Finland) Keke Rosberg	33
3	(United Kingdom) John Watson	30
4	(Austria) Niki Lauda	26
5	(France) Alain Prost	25

Constructors' Championship standings

Pos	Constructor	Points
1	(Italy) Ferrari	64
2	(United Kingdom) McLaren-Ford	56
3	(United Kingdom) Williams-Ford	46
4	(France) Renault	44
5	(United Kingdom) Lotus-Ford	29

- Note: Only the top five positions are included for both sets of standings.

Previous race: 1982 German Grand Prix	FIA Formula One World Championship; 1982 season	Next race: 1982 Swiss Grand Prix
Previous race: 1981 Austrian Grand Prix	Austrian Grand Prix	Next race: 1983 Austrian Grand Prix
