= 1981 German Grand Prix =

- Race 10 of 15 in the 1981 Formula One World Championship
- Hockenheim in 1981

Race details
- Date: 2 August 1981
- Official name: XLIII Großer Preis von Deutschland
- Location: Hockenheimring; Hockenheim, West Germany
- Course: Permanent racing facility
- Course length: 6.790 km (4.219 miles)
- Distance: 45 laps, 305.505 km (189.81 miles)
- Weather: Wet / Dry

Pole position
Driver	(France) Alain Prost	Renault
- Time: 1:47.50

Fastest lap
Driver	(Australia) Alan Jones	Williams-Ford
- Time: 1:52.42 on lap 4

Podium
First	(Brazil) Nelson Piquet	Brabham-Ford
Second	(France) Alain Prost	Renault
Third	(France) Jacques Laffite	Ligier-Matra

The 1981 German Grand Prix was a Formula One motor race held at the Hockenheimring on 2 August 1981. It was the tenth race of the 1981 Formula One World Championship.

The 45-lap race was won by Brazilian driver Nelson Piquet, driving a Brabham-Ford. Frenchman Alain Prost finished second in a Renault, having started from pole position, with compatriot Jacques Laffite third in a Ligier-Matra. The win, Piquet's third of the season, allowed him to move to within eight points of Drivers' Championship leader, Argentine Carlos Reutemann, who retired with an engine failure.

== Qualifying report ==
The pit entrance had been modified and slowed down; the drivers now entered the pits earlier than before. The two Renault turbo cars were on the front row with Alain Prost almost half a second quicker than teammate René Arnoux. It was the first pole position of Prost's F1 career. Williams locked out the second row with World Championship leader Carlos Reutemann third and teammate Alan Jones fourth. Didier Pironi was fifth in his Ferrari and Nelson Piquet was sixth in his Brabham. The top 10 was completed by Jacques Laffite (Ligier), Gilles Villeneuve (Ferrari) and the two McLarens of John Watson and Andrea de Cesaris.

=== Qualifying classification ===
Pos	No	Driver	Constructor	Q1	Q2	Gap
1	15	(France) Alain Prost	Renault	1:48.09	1:47.50	
2	16	(France) René Arnoux	Renault	1:47.96	1:48.08	+0.46
3	2	(Argentina) Carlos Reutemann	Williams-Ford	1:50.20	1:48.43	+0.93
4	1	(Australia) Alan Jones	Williams-Ford	1:48.49	1:49.38	+0.99
5	28	(France) Didier Pironi	Ferrari	1:49.00	1:49.97	+1.50
6	5	(Brazil) Nelson Piquet	Brabham-Ford	1:49.03	1:49.26	+1.53
7	26	(France) Jacques Laffite	Ligier-Matra	1:50.27	1:49.28	+1.78
8	27	(Canada) Gilles Villeneuve	Ferrari	1:49.44	1:50.24	+1.94
9	7	(United Kingdom) John Watson	McLaren-Ford	1:49.52	1:50.36	+2.02
10	8	(Italy) Andrea de Cesaris	McLaren-Ford	1:50.07	1:49.58	+2.08
11	25	(France) Patrick Tambay	Ligier-Matra	1:50.00	1:50.61	+2.50
12	22	(United States) Mario Andretti	Alfa Romeo	1:50.64	1:50.73	+3.14
13	29	(Italy) Riccardo Patrese	Arrows-Ford	1:50.68	1:50.65	+3.15
14	11	(Italy) Elio de Angelis	Lotus-Ford	1:52.36	1:50.74	+3.24
15	12	(United Kingdom) Nigel Mansell	Lotus-Ford	1:51.98	1:50.86	+3.36
16	6	(Mexico) Héctor Rebaque	Brabham-Ford	1:51.17	1:51.49	+3.67
17	32	(France) Jean-Pierre Jarier	Osella-Ford	1:52.19	1:52.95	+4.69
18	3	(United States) Eddie Cheever	Tyrrell-Ford	1:52.19	1:52.44	+4.69
19	23	(Italy) Bruno Giacomelli	Alfa Romeo	1:52.21	1:52.59	+4.71
20	9	(Sweden) Slim Borgudd	ATS-Ford	1:52.54	1:54.14	+5.04
21	17	(Republic of Ireland) Derek Daly	March-Ford	1:55.80	1:52.65	+5.15
22	33	(Switzerland) Marc Surer	Theodore-Ford	1:52.85	1:53.50	+5.35
23	14	(Chile) Eliseo Salazar	Ensign-Ford	1:55.58	1:53.16	+5.66
24	30	(Italy) Siegfried Stohr	Arrows-Ford	1:53.19	1:53.33	+5.69
DNQ	20	(Finland) Keke Rosberg	Fittipaldi-Ford	1:53.28	1:53.38	+5.78
DNQ	35	(United Kingdom) Brian Henton	Toleman-Hart	1:53.31	1:54.77	+5.81
DNQ	31	(Italy) Beppe Gabbiani	Osella-Ford	1:55.53	1:53.39	+5.89
DNQ	36	(United Kingdom) Derek Warwick	Toleman-Hart	1:54.59	1:53.58	+6.08
DNQ	4	(Italy) Michele Alboreto	Tyrrell-Ford	1:53.69	1:54.19	+6.19
DNQ	21	(Brazil) Chico Serra	Fittipaldi-Ford	1:55.22	1:54.89	+7.39

== Race report ==
The two Williams on the second row enjoyed a better start than the Renaults of Prost and Arnoux. Arnoux was overtaken both by Reutemann and Pironi before the first corner, and by Piquet tried a move in the Ostkurve but the two cars collided, deflating Arnoux's right rear tire and causing him to pit at the end of the lap. Piquet lost a place to Jones in the process, whilst Arnoux dropped through the field. On the second lap, Pironi's engine failed, making him retire from fourth. Consequently, Prost led from Reutemann, Jones, Piquet and Laffite, and the top five pulled away from the rest of the pack, led by Villeneuve in sixth. Reutemann was quickly overtaken by both Jones and Piquet, beginning a three-way fight from the lead until Piquet's tires fell off the pace and he dropped to fourth behind Reutemann.

On lap 21, the lead changed when Prost was overtaken by Jones as the duo were lapping Arnoux. Reutemann retired from the race on lap 28 with an engine failure. After around 30 laps, rain started to fall on the circuit and the Renaults suffered from poor handling and third place Piquet quickly overtook Prost for second. Jones' lead was diminished when his engine began to misfire, eventually dropping behind Piquet and Prost before heading to the pits, and he eventually finished a lap behind.

Piquet held on to his lead and finished first, in front of Prost, Laffite and Héctor Rebaque. Eddie Cheever finished fifth to round up the top five, in front of John Watson in sixth.

=== Race classification ===
Pos	No	Driver	Constructor	Tyre	Laps	Time/Retired	Grid	Points
1	5	(Brazil) Nelson Piquet	Brabham-Ford	G	45	1:25:55.60	6	9
2	15	(France) Alain Prost	Renault	MI	45	+ 11.52	1	6
3	26	(France) Jacques Laffite	Ligier-Matra	MI	45	+ 1:04.60	7	4
4	6	(Mexico) Héctor Rebaque	Brabham-Ford	G	45	+ 1:39.69	16	3
5	3	(United States) Eddie Cheever	Tyrrell-Ford	A	45	+ 1:50.52	18	2
6	7	(United Kingdom) John Watson	McLaren-Ford	MI	44	+ 1 lap	9	1
7	11	(Italy) Elio de Angelis	Lotus-Ford	G	44	+ 1 lap	14	
8	32	(France) Jean-Pierre Jarier	Osella-Ford	MI	44	+ 1 lap	17	
9	22	(United States) Mario Andretti	Alfa Romeo	MI	44	+ 1 lap	12	
10	27	(Canada) Gilles Villeneuve	Ferrari	MI	44	+ 1 lap	8	
11	1	(Australia) Alan Jones	Williams-Ford	G	44	+ 1 lap	4	
12	30	(Italy) Siegfried Stohr	Arrows-Ford	P	44	+ 1 lap	24	
13	16	(France) René Arnoux	Renault	MI	44	+ 1 lap	2	
14	33	(Switzerland) Marc Surer	Theodore-Ford	A	43	Suspension	22	
15	23	(Italy) Bruno Giacomelli	Alfa Romeo	MI	43	+ 2 laps	19	
NC	14	(Chile) Eliseo Salazar	Ensign-Ford	A	39	+ 6 laps	23	
Ret	9	(Sweden) Slim Borgudd	ATS-Ford	A	35	Engine	20	
Ret	2	(Argentina) Carlos Reutemann	Williams-Ford	G	27	Engine	3	
Ret	29	(Italy) Riccardo Patrese	Arrows-Ford	P	27	Engine	13	
Ret	25	(France) Patrick Tambay	Ligier-Matra	MI	27	Transmission	11	
Ret	17	(Republic of Ireland) Derek Daly	March-Ford	A	15	Suspension	21	
Ret	12	(United Kingdom) Nigel Mansell	Lotus-Ford	G	12	Fuel leak	15	
Ret	8	(Italy) Andrea de Cesaris	McLaren-Ford	MI	4	Collision	10	
Ret	28	(France) Didier Pironi	Ferrari	MI	1	Electrical	5	
DNQ	20	(Finland) Keke Rosberg	Fittipaldi-Ford	MI				
DNQ	35	(United Kingdom) Brian Henton	Toleman-Hart	P				
DNQ	31	(Italy) Beppe Gabbiani	Osella-Ford	MI				
DNQ	36	(United Kingdom) Derek Warwick	Toleman-Hart	P				
DNQ	4	(Italy) Michele Alboreto	Tyrrell-Ford	A				
DNQ	21	(Brazil) Chico Serra	Fittipaldi-Ford	MI				

== Notes ==
- This was the 10th Grand Prix start for Hong Kong constructor Theodore.
- This was the 11th German Grand Prix win for a Ford-powered car. It broke the previous record set by Ferrari at the 1977 German Grand Prix.

== Championship standings after the race ==
Drivers' Championship standings

Pos	Driver	Points
1	(Argentina) Carlos Reutemann	43
2	(Brazil) Nelson Piquet	35
3	(France) Jacques Laffite	25
4	(Australia) Alan Jones	24
5	(Canada) Gilles Villeneuve	21

Constructors' Championship standings

Pos	Constructor	Points
1	(United Kingdom) Williams-Ford	67
2	(United Kingdom) Brabham-Ford	43
3	(Italy) Ferrari	28
4	(France) Ligier-Matra	25
5	(France) Renault	24

- Note: Only the top five positions are included for both sets of standings.

Previous race: 1981 British Grand Prix	FIA Formula One World Championship; 1981 season	Next race: 1981 Austrian Grand Prix
Previous race: 1980 German Grand Prix	German Grand Prix	Next race: 1982 German Grand Prix
