= ATS D7 =

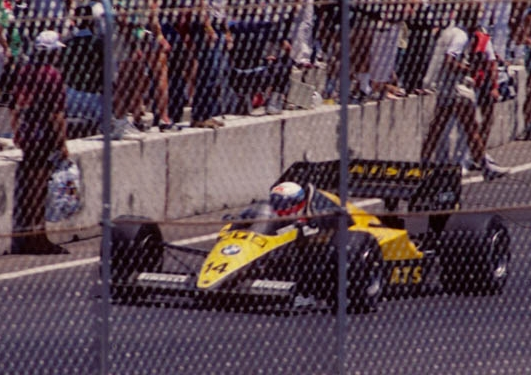
- Category: Formula One
- Constructor: ATS
- Designers: Gustav Brunner (Technical Director); Stefan Fober (Chief Designer)
- Predecessor: ATS D6

Technical specifications
- Chassis: carbon fibre monocoque
- Suspension (front): Double wishbones, pull rod, coil springs
- Suspension (rear): Double wishbones, pull rod, coil springs
- Engine: BMW M12 1,499 cc (91.5 cu in), Straight 4, turbocharger, mid-engine, longitudinally mounted
- Transmission: Team ATS / Hewland 5 speed manual
- Tyres: Pirelli

Competition history
- Notable entrants: Team ATS
- Notable drivers: 14. (West Germany) Manfred Winkelhock; 14/31. (Austria) Gerhard Berger
- Debut: 1984 Brazilian Grand Prix
Races	Wins	Poles	F/Laps
16	0	0	0
- Constructors' Championships: 0
- Drivers' Championships: 0

The ATS D7 was a Formula One racing car used by Team ATS in the 1984 Formula One season. The car was designed by Gustav Brunner and was driven for most of the season by German Manfred Winkelhock. He was joined in a second car late in the season by Formula One rookie, Austrian driver Gerhard Berger. It was the last car produced by the ATS team.

== Racing history ==
Early in the season, the D7 with its powerful turbocharged BMW engine, showed surprising speed, if not reliability. Winkelhock qualified sixth at Zolder for the Belgian Grand Prix and early in the race ran confidently in fourth place behind the Ferraris of Michele Alboreto and René Arnoux and the Renault of Derek Warwick before exhaust failure put him out on lap 39. He then qualified seventh for the next race in San Marino and again was racing in the points (top six) before his race ended in turbo failure.

Winkelhock only managed to finish two races in the quick but unreliable D7, finishing eighth in both Canada and Dallas. After joining the team for his first race in Austria, Berger enjoyed better reliability. He finished 12th at the Österreichring before gaining his first ever points finish in F1 by placing sixth in Italy at Monza. However, as ATS had only entered one car for the season and Berger was in a second entered car, no points were awarded for his drive.

Despite Berger's sixth place at Monza, the ATS D7 scored no points for the 1984 season. Following the season BMW stopped supplying the team with its engines due to the lack of results and bad publicity team owner Günter Schmid had gained for his pit lane antics. As a result, Schmid closed the team at the end of the season.

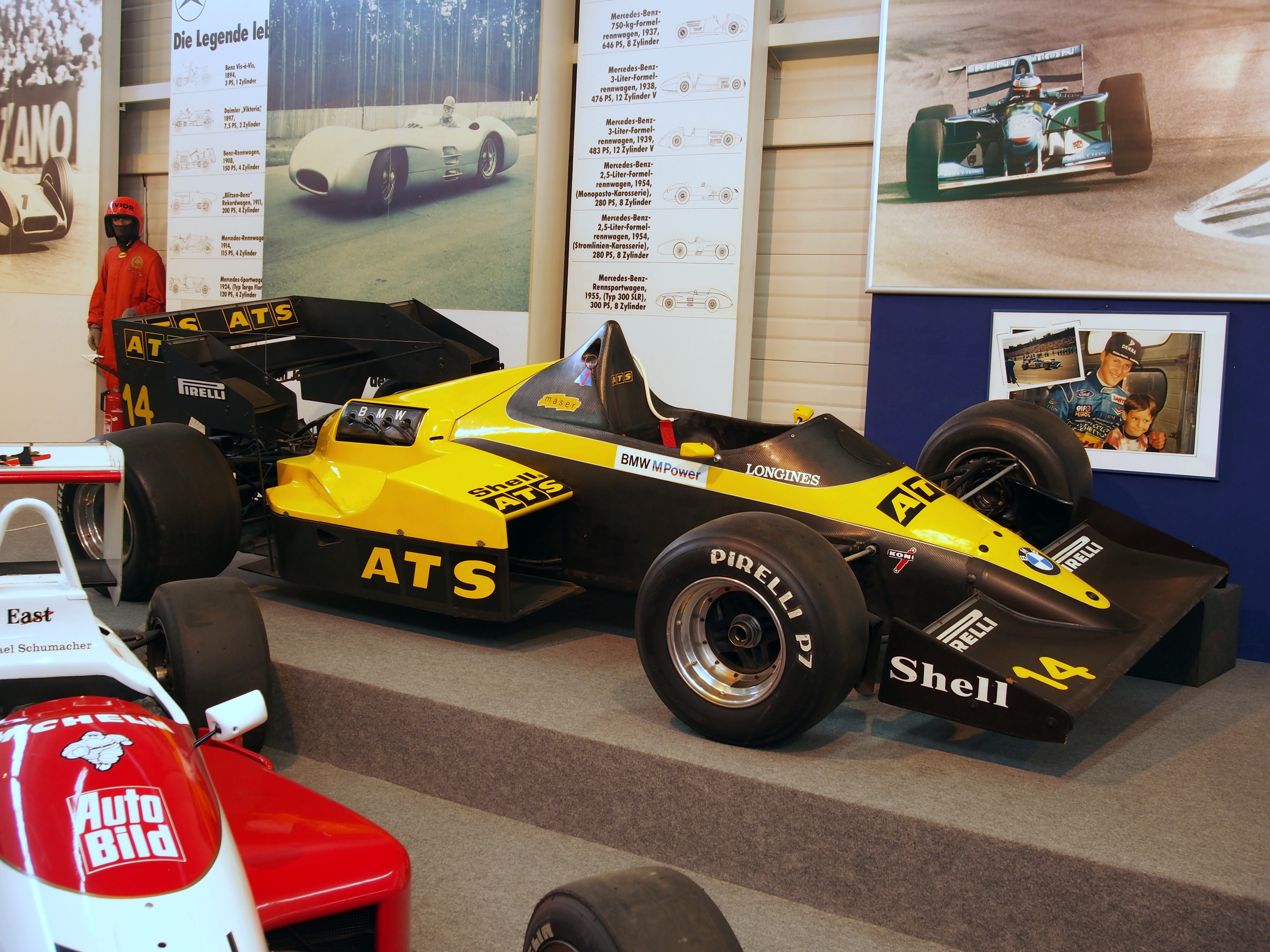
The ATS D7 on display at Hockenheim's Motor-Sport-Museum.

== Complete Formula One results ==
(key)

Year	Entrant	Engine	Tyres	Driver	1	2	3	4	5	6	7	8	9	10	11	12	13	14	15	16	WCC	Pts.
1984	Team ATS	BMW M12 1.5 L4t	P		BRA	RSA	BEL	SMR	FRA	MON	CAN	DET	DAL	GBR	GER	AUT	NED	ITA	EUR	POR	NC	0
1984	Team ATS	BMW M12 1.5 L4t	P	Manfred Winkelhock	EX	Ret	Ret	Ret	Ret	Ret	8	Ret	8	Ret	Ret	DNS	Ret	DNS			NC	0
1984	Team ATS	BMW M12 1.5 L4t	P	Gerhard Berger												12		6^{‡}	Ret	13	NC	0

^{‡} As Gerhard Berger was the team's second entry and as the team had only entered one car for the entire championship, the second entry was ineligible to score points.
