= ATS D1 =

- Category: Formula One
- Constructor: ATS
- Designers: John Gentry (Design Engineer); Gustav Brunner (Design Engineer)
- Predecessor: HS1
- Successor: D2

Technical specifications
- Chassis: Aluminium monocoque
- Axle track: Front: 1,727 mm (68.0 in); Rear: 1,613 mm (63.5 in)
- Wheelbase: 2,718 mm (107.0 in)
- Engine: Ford-Cosworth DFV 2,993 cc (182.6 cu in), 90° V8, NA, mid-engine, longitudinally mounted
- Transmission: Hewland FGA400 5-speed manual
- Weight: 587 kg (1,294 lb)
- Fuel: Shell
- Tyres: Goodyear

Competition history
- Notable entrants: ATS Racing Team
- Notable drivers: (Finland) Keke Rosberg
- Debut: 1978 United States Grand Prix
Races	Wins	Poles	F/Laps
2	0	0	0
- Constructors' Championships: 0
- Drivers' Championships: 0

The ATS D1 was a Formula One racing car manufactured and raced by the ATS Racing Team for the last two races of the 1978 Formula One season. It was powered by a Cosworth DFV V8 engine. Driven by Keke Rosberg, the D1 failed to finish any races in the points.

== Development ==
The D1 was designed by John Gentry and Gustav Brunner. Designed as a wing-car, the D1 utilised an aluminium monocoque and was powered by a Cosworth DFV V8. It was intended to be a replacement for the team's poorly performing HS1 car (a modified Penske PC4 chassis) with which it had started the 1978 Formula One season.

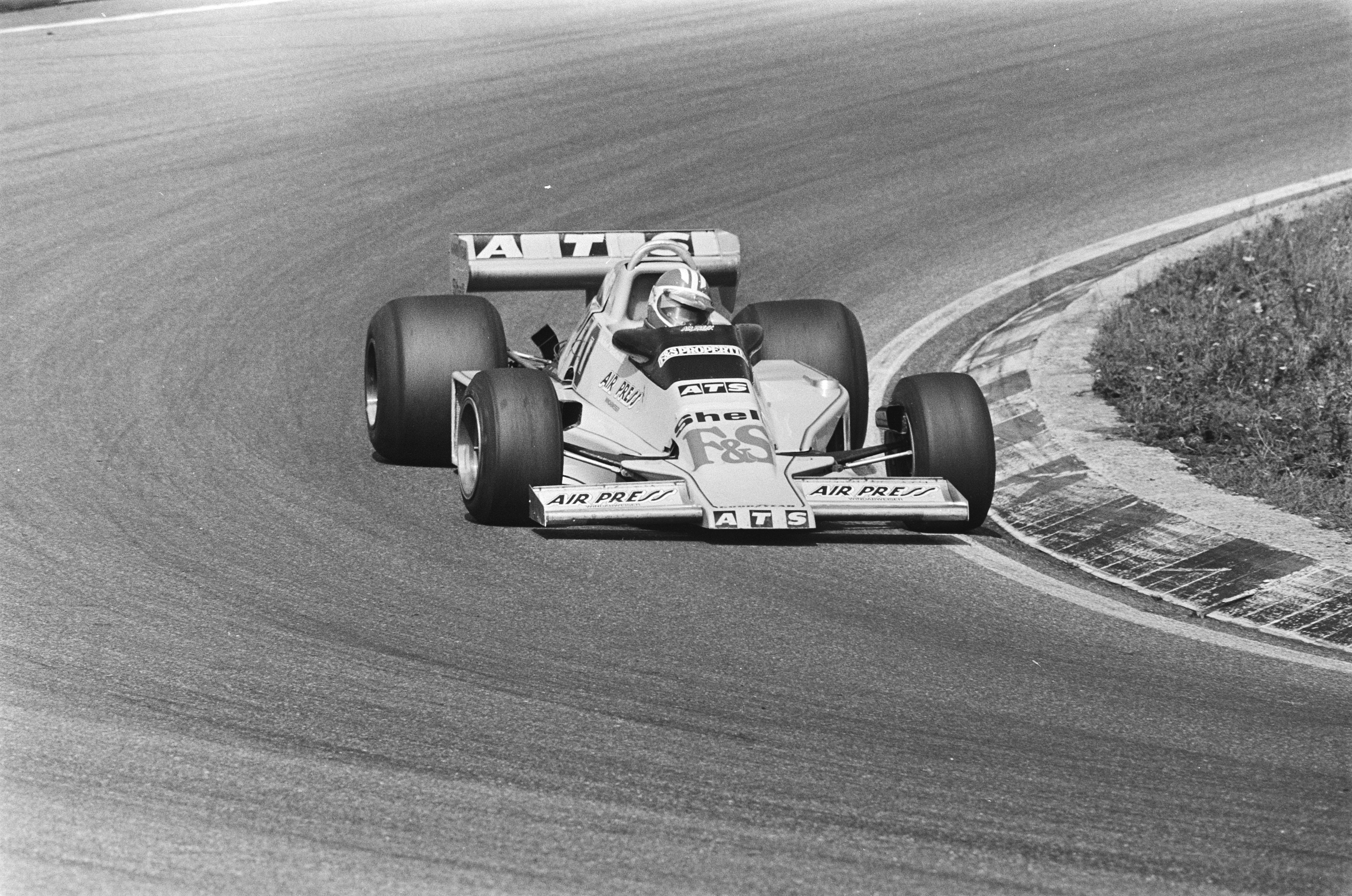
Michael Bleekemolen testing the ATS HS1 at Zandvoort in 1978.

== Racing history ==
The HS1 with which ATS had begun the season was a poor car and the team's regular drivers Jean-Pierre Jarier and Jochen Mass had struggled to even be close to competitiveness. The D1 was first used in practice for the Dutch Grand Prix and Keke Rosberg, who had stood in for Jarier earlier in the year, used it for the last two races of the season. He placed it 15th on the grid for the United States Grand Prix but retired from the race with gearbox issues. For the last race of the year in Canada, Rosberg qualified in 21st. He finished the race but was an unclassified runner.

== Complete Formula One World Championship results ==
(key) (Results in bold indicate pole position; results in italics indicate fastest lap)

Year	Entrant	Engine	Tyres	Drivers	1	2	3	4	5	6	7	8	9	10	11	12	13	14	15	16	Points	WCC
1978	ATS Racing Team	Ford Cosworth DFV	**G**		ARG	BRA	RSA	USW	MON	BEL	ESP	SWE	FRA	GBR	GER	AUT	NED	ITA	USA	CAN	**0**	**NC**
1978	ATS Racing Team	Ford Cosworth DFV	**G**	(Finland) Keke Rosberg															Ret	NC	**0**	**NC**
