= ATS D6 =

Formula One car

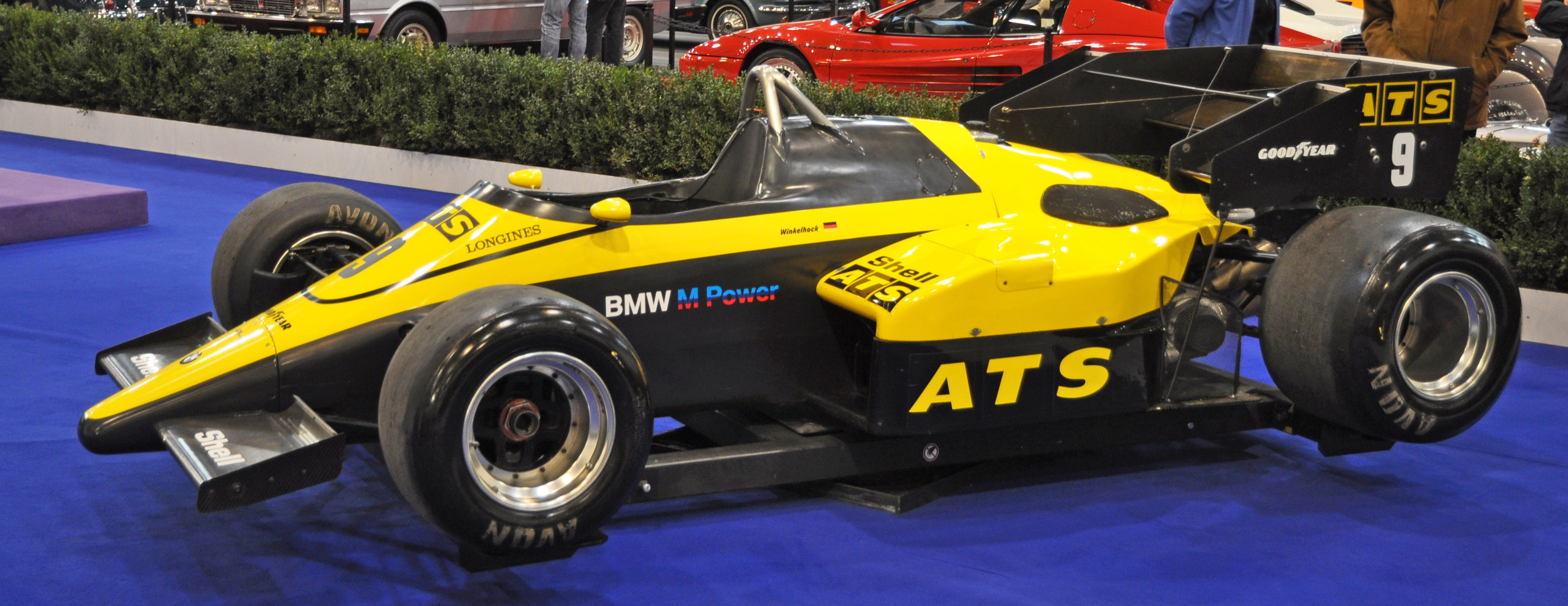
- Category: Formula One
- Constructor: ATS
- Designer: Gustav Brunner (Chief Designer)
- Predecessor: D5
- Successor: D7

Technical specifications
- Chassis: Carbon fibre monocoque
- Axle track: Front: 1,727 mm (68.0 in); Rear: 1,626 mm (64.0 in)
- Wheelbase: 2,615 mm (103.0 in)
- Engine: BMW M12/13, 1,499 cc (91.5 cu in), Straight 4, turbo, mid-engine, longitudinally mounted
- Transmission: ATS / Hewland 5-speed manual
- Weight: 540 kg (1,190 lb)
- Fuel: Shell
- Tyres: Goodyear

Competition history
- Notable entrants: Team ATS
- Notable drivers: (Germany) Manfred Winkelhock
- Debut: 1983 Brazilian Grand Prix
Races	Wins	Poles	F/Laps
15	0	0	0
- Constructors' Championships: 0
- Drivers' Championships: 0

The ATS D6 was a Formula One racing car manufactured and raced by the Team ATS during the 1983 Formula One season. It was powered by the BMW M12/13 4-cylinder turbocharged engine but the team failed to score any points.

== Development ==
The D6 was designed by Gustav Brunner, who based the chassis around a carbon-fibre monocoque. To replace the previous year's Cosworth DFV V8, team owner Günter Schmid arranged a supply of BMW M12/13 4-cylinder turbocharged engines. A total of three chassis were built during the year. The D6 was trendsetting in the way that its chassis was shaped aerodynamically at the front end so that separate bodywork was no longer needed. In the years to follow this design philosophy became the standard in Formula One; McLaren was one of the last top teams to adopt it in 1992 on the MP4/7A.

== Racing history ==
After running two entries the previous season, for 1983 ATS reverted to a single entry driven by German Manfred Winkelhock. Winkelhock usually qualified well but the team suffered poor reliability. Schmid, a notoriously autocratic and difficult team owner, made a number of management decisions which impacted the team's results.

In qualifying, Winkelhock was often in the top ten on the grid. His best qualifying performance was seventh which he achieved three times, at the San Marino, Belgian and the Canadian Grand Prix respectively. However, he finished only four races, the best of these being the European Grand Prix where he placed 8th.

== Assessment ==
In a retrospective article, Jake Boxall-Legge of Autosport called the D6 one of the best Formula One cars to never score a point, alongside the BAR 01.

== Complete Formula One World Championship results ==
(key) (Results in bold indicate pole position; results in italics indicate fastest lap)

Year	Entrant	Engine	Tyres	Drivers	Grands Prix															Points	WCC
Year	Entrant	Engine	Tyres	Drivers	BRA	USW	FRA	SMR	MON	BEL	DET	CAN	GBR	GER	AUT	NED	ITA	EUR	RSA	Points	WCC
1983	Team ATS	BMW M12/13	**G**	Manfred Winkelhock	16	Ret	Ret	11	Ret	Ret	Ret	9	Ret	DNQ	Ret	DSQ	Ret	8	Ret	0	NC
