= Manfred Winkelhock =

German racing driver (1951–1985)

- Winkelhock in 1984
- Born: 6 October 1951; Waiblingen, Württemberg-Baden, West Germany
- Died: 12 August 1985 (aged 33); Toronto, Ontario, Canada
- Cause of death: Injuries sustained at the 1985 1000km of Mosport
- Spouse: Martina
- Children: 2, including Markus
- Relatives: Joachim Winkelhock (brother); Thomas Winkelhock (brother)

Formula One World Championship career
- Nationality: (West Germany) West German
- Active years: 1980, 1982–1985
- Team(s): Arrows, ATS, Brabham, RAM
- Entries: 56 (47 starts)
- Championships: 0
- Wins: 0
- Podiums: 0
- Career points: 2
- Pole positions: 0
- Fastest laps: 0
- First entry: 1980 Italian Grand Prix
- Last entry: 1985 German Grand Prix

24 Hours of Le Mans career
- Years: 1979, 1982
- Teams: BMW, Ford
- Best finish: 6th (1979)
- Class wins: 0

Manfred Winkelhock (6 October 1951 – 12 August 1985) was a German racing driver, who competed in Formula One between 1980 and 1985. (Note: The exact years Winkelhock competed in Formula One: 1980, 1982–1985.)

Born and raised in Waiblingen, Winkelhock was the older brother of Joachim and Thomas. Winkelhock participated in 56 Formula One Grands Prix for Arrows, ATS, Brabham and RAM, with a best finish of fifth at the 1982 Brazilian Grand Prix.

During the 1985 1000 km of Mosport, Winkelhock died following a single-vehicle collision with a concrete barrier, driving the Porsche 962C for Kremer. His son Markus went on to also compete in Formula One at the 2007 European Grand Prix for Spyker, and won the FIA GT1 World Championship in 2012 with Münnich.

== Racing career ==
Born in Waiblingen on 6 October 1951, Winkelhock was the older brother of Joachim and Thomas. After winning the Volkswagen Scirocco Cup in 1976, he began racing in Formula Two in 1978 and survived a major crash at Nürburgring Nordschleife circuit. The front wing of his March 802, still made of metal at that time, got bent early in the race, suffering some loss of downforce. Despite driving carefully, in the fourth lap, when going over the very steep rise of Quiddelbacher Höhe before Flugplatz corner, the car suddenly lifted its nose, went airborne, somersaulted backwards and then sideways.

Winkelhock along with Hervé Poulain and Marcel Mignot drove a BMW M1 Group 4 racing version that was painted by pop artist Andy Warhol for the 1979 24 Hours of Le Mans. They came in sixth overall and second in their class.

Winkelhock's first attempt at qualifying for a Formula One Grand Prix race was in Italy, when he stood in for the injured Jochen Mass at Arrows. He was able to land a drive with ATS in 1982. As BMW became the team's engine supplier in 1983, he qualified well on several occasions in 1983 and 1984, but the car was rarely reliable, so there were few results and a lot of accidents. In 1984 he won the ADAC Norisring Trophäe, and in 1985 he won the 1000 km of Monza.

Winkelhock's son, Markus, is also a racing driver. He participated in only one F1 race, the European GP at the Nürburgring in 2007, and led for six laps due to rain.

== Death ==
At the same time, Winkelhock was a regular sports car and touring car driver, winning the 1000km Monza with Marc Surer in 1985. He was killed in the summer of 1985 when he crashed heavily at the fearsome Turn 2 at Mosport Park of Bowmanville near Toronto, Ontario, Canada, during the Budweiser 1000 km World Endurance Championship event, driving a Porsche 962C for Kremer Racing with co-driver Marc Surer. The crash was on Sunday, 11 August, and he succumbed to injuries the next day while at the Sunnybrook Medical Center in Toronto.

At the time of Winkelhock's death, he was a driver for the Skoal Bandit sponsored RAM Racing team in Formula One, though it had been a frustrating season with a best finish of 12th in the 1985 French Grand Prix at Paul Ricard. His death saw him replaced by Northern Irish driver Kenny Acheson, though lack of money saw the team fold before the end of the 1985 season.

== Racing record ==
=== Complete European Formula Two Championship results ===
(key) (Races in bold indicate pole position; races in italics indicate fastest lap)

Year	Entrant	Chassis	Engine	1	2	3	4	5	6	7	8	9	10	11	12	Pos	Pts
1978	Polifac BMW Junior Team	March 782	BMW	THR; 5												8th	11
1978	March Racing Ltd	March 782	BMW		HOC; 12	NÜR; Ret	PAU; 8	MUG; 9	VAL; 4	ROU; 12	DON; 5	NOG; 7	PER; 9	MIS; Ret	HOC; 3	8th	11
1979	Cassani Racing	Ralt RT1	BMW	SIL	HOC	THR	NÜR; 3	VAL	MUG	PAU	HOC	ZAN	PER	MIS	DON	16th	4
1980	ICI Racing Team	March 802	BMW	THR; Ret	HOC; Ret	NÜR; Ret	VAL; 10	PAU; 8	SIL; 9	ZOL; 7	MUG; 10	ZAN; 10	PER; 3	MIS; 9	HOC; 7	13th	4
1981	Schäfer Racing	Ralt RT2	BMW	SIL	HOC; 2	THR; Ret	NÜR; DSQ	VAL	MUG	PAU	PER					9th	12
1981	Maurer Motorsport	Maurer MM81	BMW									SPA; 5	**DON**; 3	MIS	MAN	9th	12

=== Complete Formula One results ===
(key)

Year	Entrant	Chassis	Engine	1	2	3	4	5	6	7	8	9	10	11	12	13	14	15	16	WDC	Points
1980	Warsteiner Arrows	Arrows A3	Cosworth DFV V8	ARG	BRA	RSA	USW	BEL	MON	FRA	GBR	GER	AUT	NED	ITA; DNQ	CAN	USA			NC	0
1982	Team ATS	ATS D5	Cosworth DFV V8	RSA; 10	BRA; 5	USW; Ret	SMR; DSQ	BEL; Ret	MON; Ret	DET; Ret	CAN; DNQ	NED; 12	GBR; DNQ	FRA; 11	GER; Ret	AUT; Ret	SUI; Ret	ITA; DNQ	CPL; NC	24th	2
1983	Team ATS	ATS D6	BMW M12 L4t	BRA; 16	USW; Ret	FRA; Ret	SMR; 11	MON; Ret	BEL; Ret	DET; Ret	CAN; 9	GBR; Ret	GER; DNQ	AUT; Ret	NED; DSQ	ITA; Ret	EUR; 8	RSA; Ret		NC	0
1984	Team ATS	ATS D7	BMW M12 L4t	BRA; EX	RSA; Ret	BEL; Ret	SMR; Ret	FRA; Ret	MON; Ret	CAN; 8	DET; Ret	DAL; 8	GBR; Ret	GER; Ret	AUT; DNS	NED; Ret	ITA; DNS	EUR		NC	0
1984	MRD International	Brabham BT53	BMW M12 L4t																POR; 10	NC	0
1985	Skoal Bandit F1 Team	RAM 03	Hart 415T L4t	BRA; 13	POR; NC	SMR; Ret	MON; DNQ	CAN; Ret	DET; Ret	FRA; 12	GBR; Ret	GER; Ret	AUT	NED	ITA	BEL	EUR	RSA	AUS	NC	0

=== Complete 24 Hours of Le Mans results ===
Year	Team	Co-Drivers	Car	Class	Laps	Pos.	Class Pos.
1979	(France) H. Poulain	(France) Hervé Poulain (France) Marcel Mignot	BMW M1	IMSA	288	6th	**2nd**
1982	(West Germany) Ford-Werke AG (West Germany) Zakspeed	(West Germany) Klaus Niedzwiedz	Ford C100	C	71	DNF	DNF

== Notes ==
Sporting positions
Preceded by Hans-Joachim Stuck	Guia Race winner 1981	Succeeded by Helmut Greiner
