= ATS D5 =

ATS HGS1 ATS D5
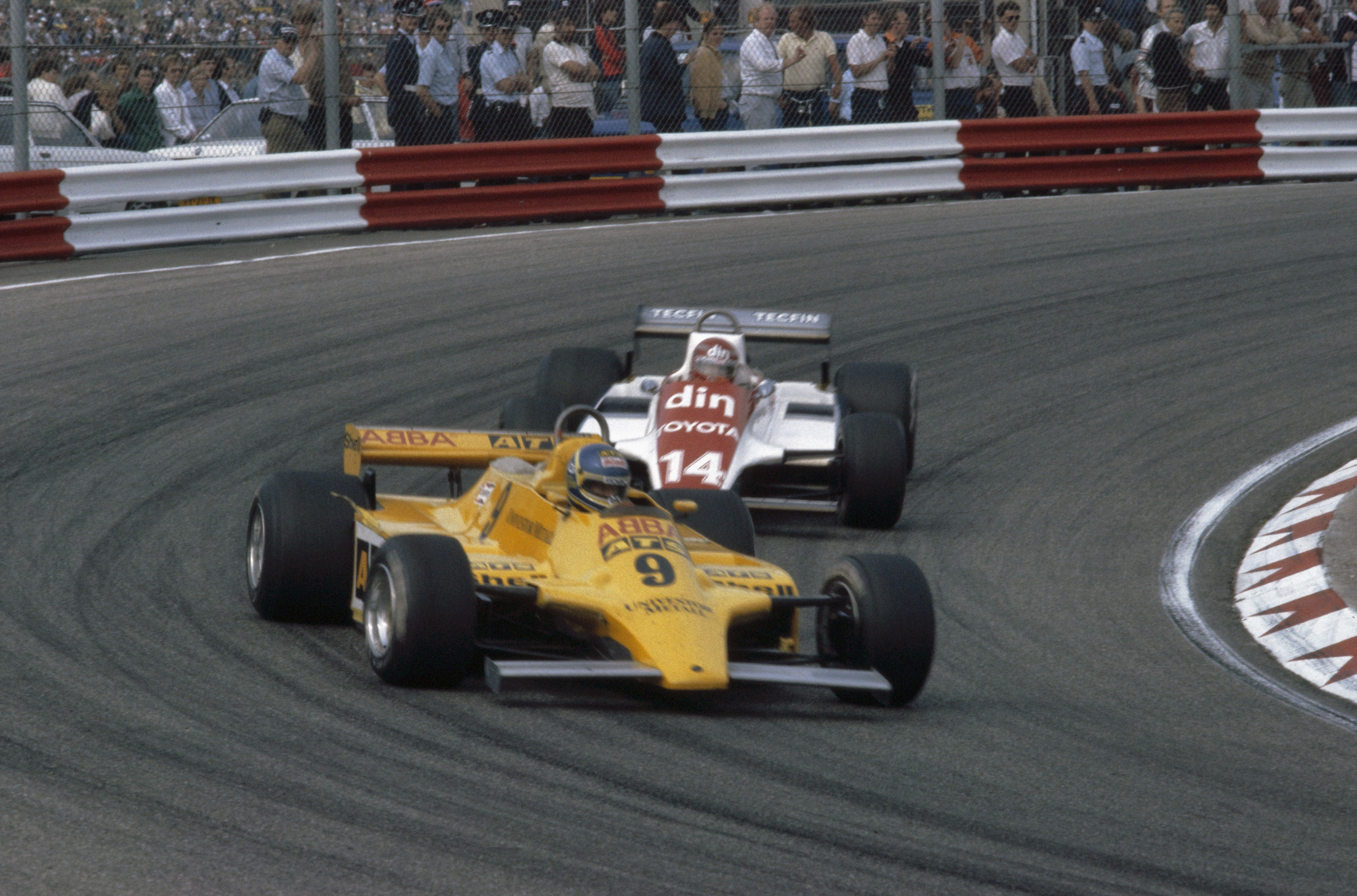
- Slim Borgudd driving the HGS1 at the 1981 Dutch Grand Prix
- Category: Formula One
- Constructor: ATS
- Designer(s): Hervé Guilpin (technical director); Tim Wadrop (chief designer); Don Halliday (head of design)
- Predecessor: ATS D4
- Successor: ATS D6

Technical specifications
- Chassis: Aluminium monocoque
- Axle track: Front: 1,826 mm (71.9 in); Rear: 1,727 mm (68.0 in)
- Wheelbase: 2,718 mm (107.0 in)
- Engine: Ford Cosworth DFV, 2,993 cc (182.6 cu in), 90° V8, NA, mid-engine, longitudinally mounted
- Transmission: Hewland FGA 400 5-speed manual
- Weight: 585 kg (1,290 lb)
- Fuel: Shell
- Tyres: Michelin/Avon

Competition history
- Notable entrants: Team ATS
- Notable drivers: (Sweden) Slim Borgudd (Germany) Manfred Winkelhock
- Debut: 1981 Belgian Grand Prix
Races	Wins	Poles	F/Laps
20	0	0	0
- Constructors' Championships: 0
- Drivers' Championships: 0

The ATS D5 was a Formula One racing car manufactured and raced by the Team ATS racing team during the 1981 and 1982 Formula One seasons. Originally known as the HGS1 in 1981, it was updated for 1982 and designated the D5. It was powered by the Ford-Cosworth DFV V8. The team scored five points with the chassis across the two seasons it was raced.

== Development ==
The chassis was designed by Hervé Guilpin and Tim Wadrop and was updated by Don Halliday for the 1982 season, for which it was known as the D5. It utilised an aluminium monocoque and was powered by a Ford Cosworth DFV V8.

== Racing history ==
=== 1981 ===
The HGS1 made its first appearance partway through the 1981 Formula One season at the Belgian Grand Prix, where it was driven by Slim Borgudd. However, he failed to qualify for the race as well as the following two events. At the British Grand Prix he qualified in 21st and then on went on to finish sixth. This proved to be Team ATS's only point of the year.

=== 1982 ===
Team ATS continued to use the HGS1, now designated as the D5, for the 1982 Formula One season. Manfred Winkelhock joined the team as a replacement for Borgudd and Eliseo Salazar was the second driver. The pair started the season with promise, finishing 9th and 10th in South Africa and Winkelhock then finished fifth at the Brazilian race for two points. Salazar finished fifth at Imola although this race saw a reduced field of entrants due to a boycott by most of the FOCA aligned teams.

No further points were scored for the remainder of the season. The drivers would generally qualify towards the rear of the field although Winkelhock did start the United States Grand Prix from fifth on the grid. Reliability was often an issue with several retirements due to mechanical failures. There was the odd driver error, notably when Salazar collided with Brabham's Nelson Piquet at the 1982 German Grand Prix.

== Complete Formula One World Championship results ==
(key)

Year	Entrant	Chassis	Engine	Drivers	1	2	3	4	5	6	7	8	9	10	11	12	13	14	15	16	Points	WCC
1981	Team ATS	HGS1	Ford DFV V8		USW	BRA	ARG	SMR	BEL	MON	ESP	FRA	GBR	GER	AUT	NED	ITA	CAN	CPL		1	13th
1981	Team ATS	HGS1	Ford DFV V8	Slim Borgudd					DNQ	DNPQ	DNQ	DNQ	6	Ret	Ret	10	Ret	Ret	DNQ		1	13th
1982	Team ATS	D5	Ford DFV V8		RSA	BRA	USW	SMR	BEL	MON	DET	CAN	NED	GBR	FRA	GER	AUT	SUI	ITA	CPL	4	12th
1982	Team ATS	D5	Ford DFV V8	Manfred Winkelhock	10	5	Ret	DSQ	Ret	Ret	Ret	DNQ	12	DNQ	11	Ret	Ret	Ret	DNQ	NC	4	12th
1982	Team ATS	D5	Ford DFV V8	Eliseo Salazar	9	Ret	Ret	5	Ret	Ret	Ret	Ret	13	DNQ	Ret	Ret	DNQ	14	9	DNQ	4	12th

== Bibliography ==
- Henry, Alan (1985). Brabham: The Grand Prix Cars. Richmond, Surrey, United Kingdom: Hazelton Publishing. ISBN 0905138368.
- Nye, Doug (1985). Autocourse History of the Grand Prix Car 1966–1985. Richmond, Surrey, United Kingdom: Hazelton Publishing. ISBN 0905138376.
