= ATS HS1 =

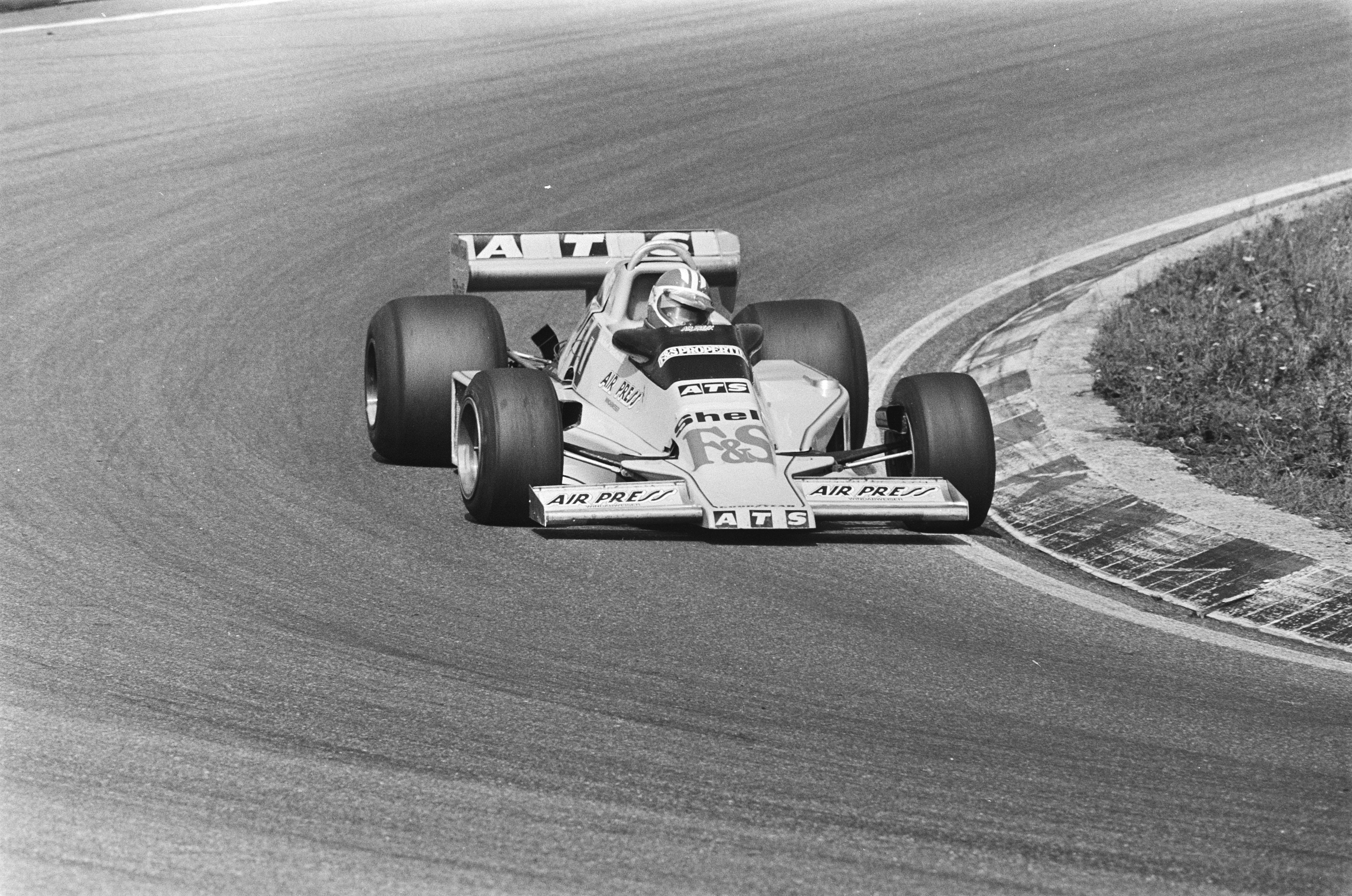
- Category: Formula One
- Constructor: ATS
- Designers: John Gentry; Robin Herd
- Successor: D1 / D2

Technical specifications
- Chassis: Aluminium monocoque
- Wheelbase: 2,720 mm (107 in)
- Engine: Ford-Cosworth DFV 2,993 cc (182.6 cu in), 90° V8, NA, mid-engine, longitudinally mounted
- Transmission: Hewland FGA400 5-speed manual
- Weight: 585 kg (1,290 lb)
- Fuel: Shell
- Tyres: Goodyear

Competition history
- Notable entrants: ATS Racing Team
- Notable drivers: (Germany) Jochen Mass (France) Jean-Pierre Jarier (Italy) Alberto Colombo (Finland) Keke Rosberg (Austria) Hans Binder (Netherlands) Michael Bleekemolen (Austria) Harald Ertl
- Debut: 1978 Argentine Grand Prix
Races	Wins	Poles	F/Laps
16	0	0	0
- Constructors' Championships: 0
- Drivers' Championships: 0

The ATS HS1 was a Formula One car used by ATS during the 1978 Formula One season. It was designed by John Gentry and Robin Herd.

== Racing history ==
After running a Penske PC4 for 1977, ATS built their own car for 1978 with German Jochen Mass and Frenchman Jean-Pierre Jarier as their drivers. The opening race of the season was the Argentine Grand Prix with Mass 11th and Jarier 12th. In Brazil, The German had a fuel leak prior to the warm up lap and the team ordered Jarier to give his car up to Mass as he was team leader and the Frenchman didn't start and Mass finished seventh. The South African Grand Prix saw the Mass retire with engine failure and Jarier finish eighth. At the United States West, The German retired with brake failure and the Frenchmen finished 11th but the Monaco Grand Prix saw both drivers failed to qualify. Jarier left ATS after Monaco as he wanted to focus on Formula 2 and Can-Am to rebuild his career and was replaced by Italian Alberto Colombo for Belgium but he failed to qualify and Mass finished 11th, Spanish Grand Prix saw the Italian failed to qualify and the German finish ninth. Prior to Sweden, ATS split with Colombo and was replaced by Finland's Keke Rosberg as Theodore Racing whom he was driving for didn't show up, he finished 15th and Mass finished 13th. The French Grand Prix saw Mass finish 13th and Rosberg 16th, Mass was non classified in Britain as he was eleven laps down and Rosberg retired with suspension failure. The German Grand Prix saw Rosberg return to Theodore Racing and was replaced by Jarier but he failed to qualify and Mass retired from his home race after colliding with fellow German Hans-Joachim Stuck. Jarier quit the team and was replaced by Austrian Hans Binder for Austria but both cars failed to qualify, Binder was replaced by Dutchman Michael Bleekemolen for the Dutch Grand Prix but both cars failed to qualify. In Italy, Mass injured his knee during practice and was out for the rest of the season, he was replaced by Austrian Harald Ertl, who was eliminated in the pre-qualifying session in his Ensign but both cars failed to qualify. ATS entered one HS1 for the final two races of the season as they had built the ATS D1 for Rosberg to use for the rest of the season. Bleekemolen remained for the final two races, he retired from the United States with an Oil Leak and then failed to qualify for Canada.

== Complete Formula One World Championship results ==
(key) (results in italics indicate fastest lap)

Year	Entrants	Engines	Tyres	Drivers	1	2	3	4	5	6	7	8	9	10	11	12	13	14	15	16	Points	WCC
1978	ATS Racing Team	Ford Cosworth DFV 3.0 V8	G		ARG	BRA	RSA	USW	MON	BEL	ESP	SWE	FRA	GBR	GER	AUT	NED	ITA	USA	CAN	0	-
1978	ATS Racing Team	Ford Cosworth DFV 3.0 V8	G	Jochen Mass	11	7	Ret	Ret	DNQ	11	9	13	13	NC	Ret	DNQ	DNQ	PO			0	-
1978	ATS Racing Team	Ford Cosworth DFV 3.0 V8	G	Jean-Pierre Jarier	12	DNS	8	11	DNQ						DNQ						0	-
1978	ATS Racing Team	Ford Cosworth DFV 3.0 V8	G	Alberto Colombo						DNQ	DNQ										0	-
1978	ATS Racing Team	Ford Cosworth DFV 3.0 V8	G	Keke Rosberg								15	16	Ret							0	-
1978	ATS Racing Team	Ford Cosworth DFV 3.0 V8	G	Hans Binder												DNQ					0	-
1978	ATS Racing Team	Ford Cosworth DFV 3.0 V8	G	Michael Bleekemolen													DNQ	DNQ	Ret	DNQ	0	-
1978	ATS Racing Team	Ford Cosworth DFV 3.0 V8	G	Harald Ertl														DNQ			0	-
