= Hans Binder =

Austrian racing driver (born 1948)

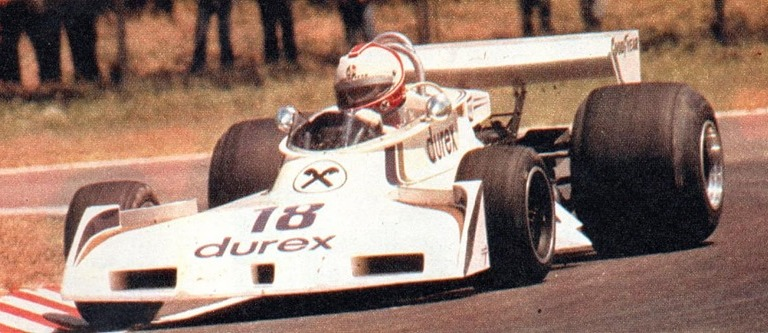
- Binder in the 1977 Argentine Grand Prix
- Born: 12 June 1948 (age 78); Zell am Ziller, Tyrol, Austria
- Relatives: Franz Binder (brother); René Binder (nephew)

Formula One World Championship career
- Nationality: (Austria) Austrian
- Active years: 1976–1978
- Team(s): Ensign, Wolf–Williams, Surtees, ATS
- Entries: 15 (13 starts)
- Championships: 0
- Wins: 0
- Podiums: 0
- Career points: 0
- Pole positions: 0
- Fastest laps: 0
- First entry: 1976 Austrian Grand Prix
- Last entry: 1978 Austrian Grand Prix

Hans Binder (born 12 June 1948) is an Austrian former Formula One driver who raced for the Ensign, Wolf, Surtees and ATS teams.

== Career ==
Binder won the European Formula Ford Championship in 1972 and moved into Formula 2 in 1976. During this year, he raced at his home Grand Prix and the Japanese GP. In 1977, he moved to the Surtees team and also raced three times for ATS. He then returned to Surtees before the end of the season. In 1978, he failed to qualify for his home Grand Prix with ATS before disappearing from the Formula One scene. He has since been in the family business Binderholz GmbH dealing in timber products.

Binder's brother Franz was also a racing driver, and his nephew René competed in the IndyCar Series in 2018.

== Complete Formula One results ==
(key)

Year	Entrant	Chassis	Engine	1	2	3	4	5	6	7	8	9	10	11	12	13	14	15	16	17	WDC	Pts
1976	Team Ensign	Ensign N176	Ford Cosworth DFV 3.0 V8	BRA	RSA	USW	ESP	BEL	MON	SWE	FRA	GBR	GER	AUT; Ret	NED	ITA	CAN	USA			NC	0
1976	Walter Wolf Racing	Wolf–Williams FW05	Ford Cosworth DFV 3.0 V8																JPN; Ret		NC	0
1977	Durex Team Surtees	Surtees TS19	Ford Cosworth DFV 3.0 V8	ARG; Ret	BRA; Ret	RSA; 11	USW; 11	ESP; 9	MON; Ret	BEL	SWE	FRA	GBR	GER				USA; 11	CAN; Ret	JPN; Ret	NC	0
1977	ATS Racing Team	Penske PC4	Ford Cosworth DFV 3.0 V8												AUT; 12	NED; 8	ITA; DNQ				NC	0
1978	ATS Racing Team	ATS HS1	Ford Cosworth DFV 3.0 V8	ARG	BRA	RSA	USW	MON	BEL	ESP	SWE	FRA	GBR	GER	AUT; DNQ	NED	ITA	USA	CAN		NC	0
