= ATS Wheels =

German wheel manufacturer

ATS
- Full name: ATS Wheels
- Base: Germany
- Founder(s): Günter Schmid
- Noted staff: Robin Herd; Giacomo Caliri; Gustav Brunner; Jo Ramírez; Vic Elford; Peter Collins; Fred Opert; Alistair Caldwell
- Noted drivers: (France) Jean-Pierre Jarier (Finland) Keke Rosberg (Germany) Manfred Winkelhock (Chile) Eliseo Salazar (Austria) Gerhard Berger

Formula One World Championship career
- First entry: 1977 United States Grand Prix West
- Races entered: 116 (99 starts)
- Constructors' Championships: 0
- Drivers' Championships: 0
- Race victories: 0 (best finish: 5th, 1979 United States Grand Prix and 1982 Brazilian and San Marino Grands Prix)
- Pole positions: 0 (best grid position: 4th, 1980 United States Grand Prix West)
- Fastest laps: 0
- Final entry: 1984 Portuguese Grand Prix

ATS (Auto Technisches Spezialzubehör) is a German company that manufactures alloy wheels for road and racing cars. It is based in Bad Dürkheim near the Hockenheimring race circuit. ATS had a Formula One racing team that was active from 1977 to 1984.

== Wheel manufacturer ==
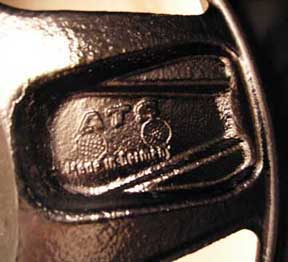
ATS stamp on the back spoke of a circa 1984 AMG alloy wheel.

ATS was founded in 1969 by Günter Schmid. The company specialised in lightweight wheels for Porsche, VW and Mercedes-Benz automobiles. ATS manufactured the "Penta" wheel used by Mercedes tuning company AMG from 1979 into the 1980s. After sponsoring a string of national motorsport events, Schmidt decided to enter Grand Prix racing with his own team.

=== The 1970s ===
In 1977, ATS purchased the remaining PC4 chassis from Penske Racing after the American team retired from Formula One. Jean-Pierre Jarier was signed to drive the car, and the team went off to an auspiciuos start, with Jarier finishing 6th on the team's debut at the United States Grand Prix West.

A second car was entered in the 1977 German Grand Prix for German touring car racer Hans Heyer. Heyer failed to qualify, but famously took the start anyway in front of his home crowd at the Hockenheimring. The race organisers only noticed when he retired with a broken gear linkage. Hans Binder would then take the second car for the rest of the season, though the team elected to sit out from the final three races of the year in Japan, Canada and the United States.

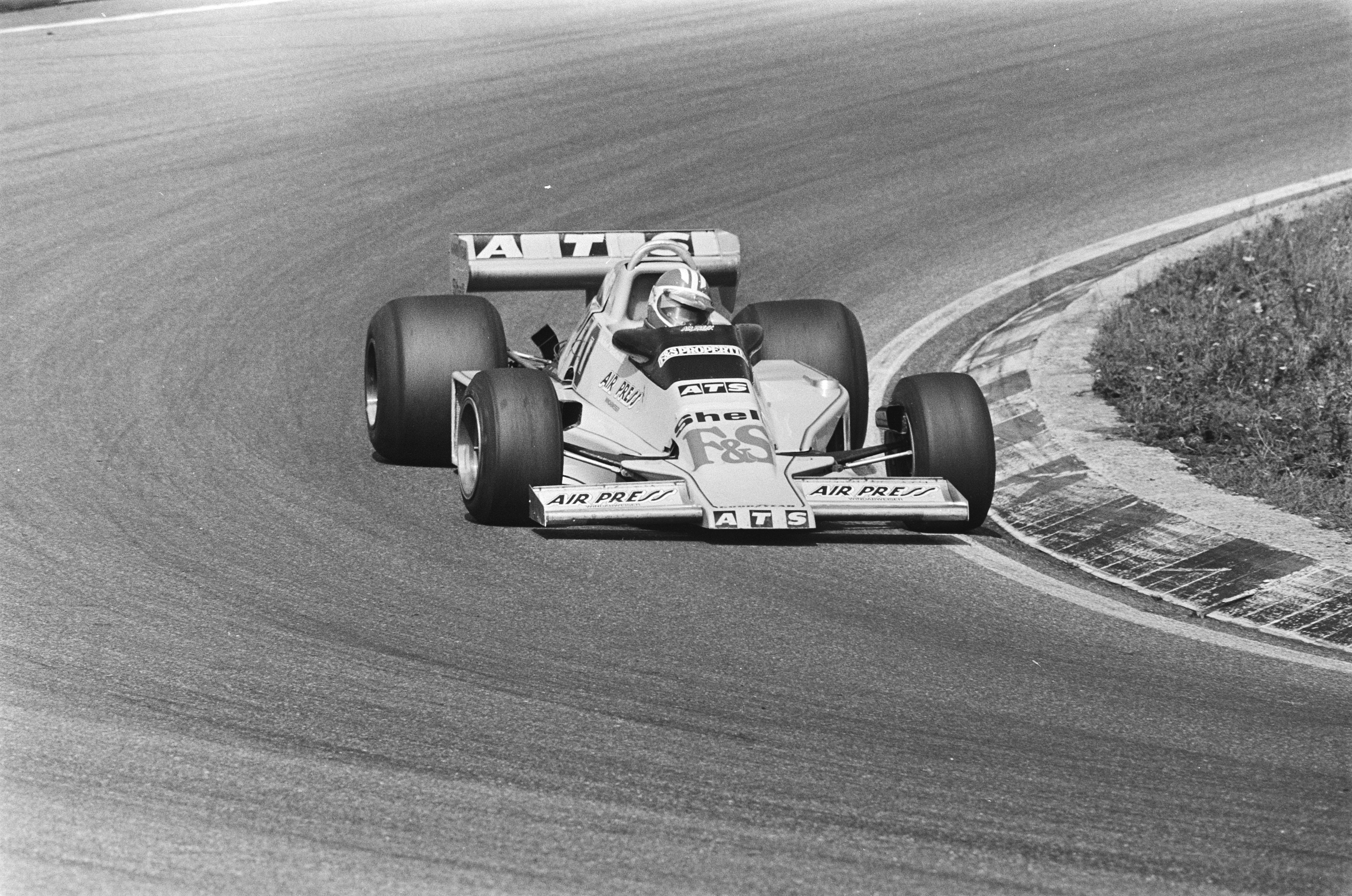
Michael Bleekemolen testing the ATS HS1 at Zandvoort in 1978

In 1978 Schmidt hired former March Engineering designer Robin Herd to build the first genuine ATS Formula One car, the HS1. Jarier was retained and paired with German driver Jochen Mass. The season proved to be turbulent. Jarier finished 8th at the South African Grand Prix, but was fired after an argument with Schmidt, and replaced by Alberto Colombo for the Belgian Grand Prix. After two failures to qualify, Colombo was let go and replaced by Keke Rosberg until the German Grand Prix. There, Jarier returned, having patched up his differences with Schmid, only for them to re-emerge following Jarier's failure to qualify. Binder returned for one race, before Michael Bleekemolen took over. After breaking a leg during testing, Mass was replaced with Harald Ertl. Ertl didn't qualify for the race, and Rosberg returned for the final two races. Despite the introduction of the new D1 chassis designed by John Gentry that featured skirts, wider track and side pods, the team's fortunes didn't improve. The D1 was used in the last two races of the 1978 season.

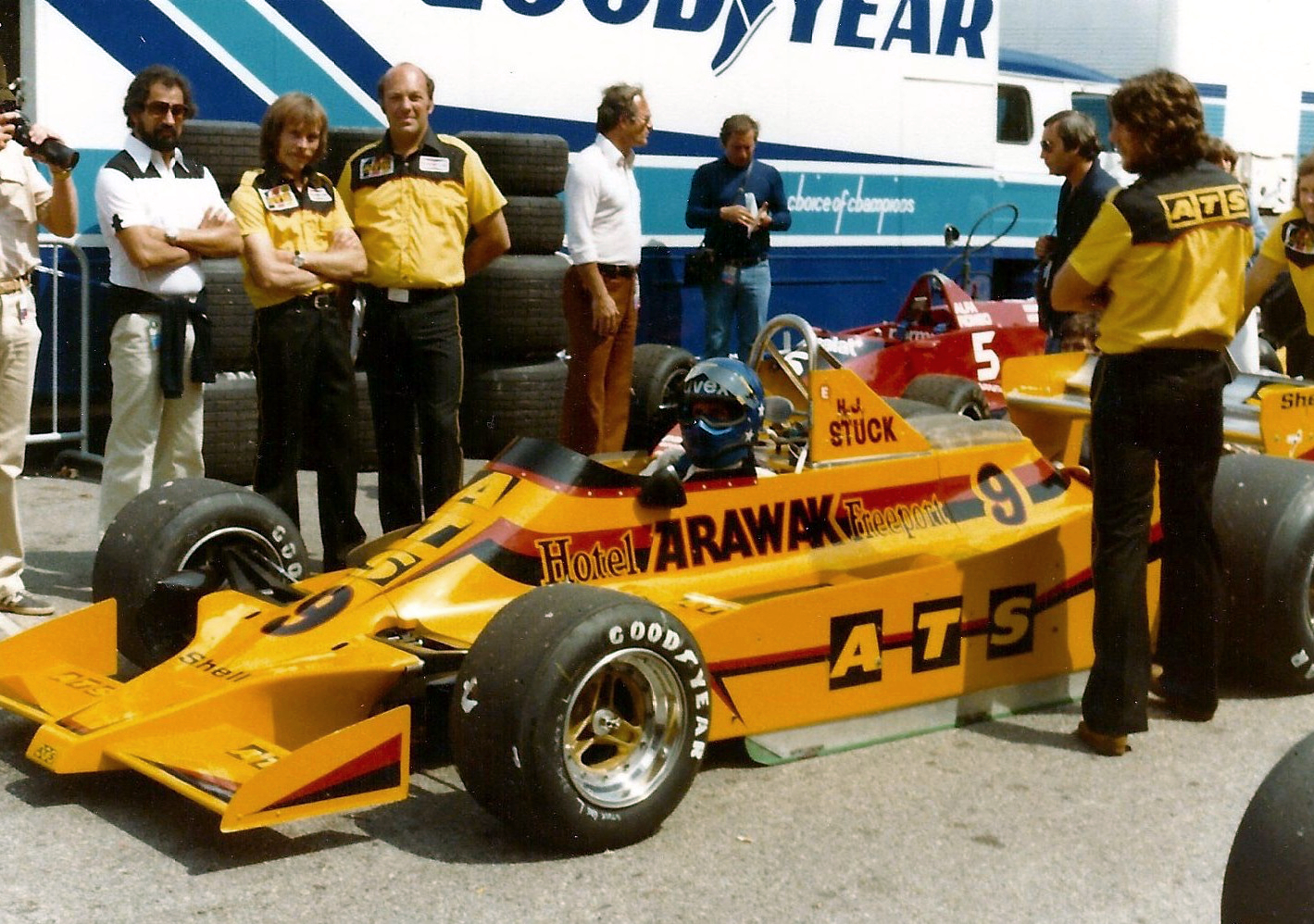
Hans-Joachim Stuck in an ATS F1 car at the 1979 Monaco Grand Prix. Team manager Fred Opert is pictured in a team shirt, facing the camera, on the right

In 1979 the team reverted to the idea of fielding one single car, with Hans-Joachim Stuck as the driver. The new D2 designed by John Gentry and Giacomo Caliri arrived mid-season but it was an ill-handling car. Another chassis designed by Nigel Stroud, the D3, was swiftly introduced and Stuck took the team's only points score of the season with a 5th place at the United States Grand Prix.

=== The 1980s ===
The team stepped up to a two-car operation again in 1980, with Marc Surer and Jan Lammers signed to drive the D3 while Gustav Brunner was hired to design the new D4. Surer finished 7th at the Brazilian Grand Prix, but suffered broken legs after an accident in practice at the South African Grand Prix. The team chose not to replace Surer and run one single car. Lammers managed to qualify 4th for the United States Grand Prix West but retired after a collision at the start. Surer returned for the French Grand Prix and replaced Lammers, though the team failed to score points for the rest of the season.

The team started the 1981 season with Lammers at the wheel of the D4. At the San Marino Grand Prix, a second car was fielded for Slim Borgudd, who brought sponsorship from Swedish pop band ABBA as he had drummed with the band in the 1970s. After outqualifying Lammers, Borgudd was retained for the rest of the season. Halfway through the season the team debuted the new HGS1 designed by Hervé Guilpin. Borgudd finished 6th at the British Grand Prix but otherwise results were poor.

Schmid made a major effort to get the team together for 1982. Two D5 cars (a heavily upgraded version of the HGS1) were fielded for Manfred Winkelhock and Eliseo Salazar. This brought better results, with Winkelhock 5th at the Brazilian Grand Prix and Salazar 5th at the San Marino Grand Prix. (Winkelhock would have taken 7th at the former, but due to both Nelson Piquet and Keke Rosberg being disqualified after the race, Winklehock moved up to 5th, while most of the teams boycotted the latter race, with ATS being one of the few who did race). Salazar also earned unwanted publicity when he collided with the race-leading Brazilian Nelson Piquet while being lapped at the German Grand Prix. Piquet physically attacked Salazar once out of the car, and the incident was widely televised.

=== BMW engines ===
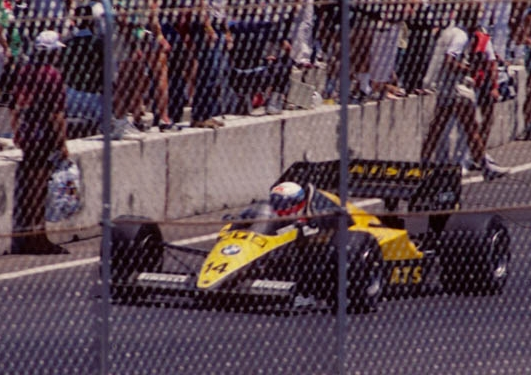
Manfred Winkelhock in the ATS D7 at the 1984 Dallas Grand Prix

In 1983 Schmid secured a supply of BMW's powerful BMW M12/13 4-cylinder turbocharged engine. ATS fielded a single new Gustav Brunner-designed D6 car for Winkelhock. There were some good qualifying results from the German, but reliability problems marred his season, and 8th place at the European Grand Prix was his best result.

For 1984, Brunner's new D7 chassis was introduced. Winkelhock ran 3rd at the Belgian Grand Prix before the electrical system failed, but his best finishes were 8th places in the Canadian Grand Prix and the Dallas Grand Prix. From the Austrian Grand Prix, a second D7 was added for Gerhard Berger. After a gearbox failure on the grid at the Italian Grand Prix, Winkelhock finally quit. In the race, Berger finished 6th, but the point was not awarded as the second entry had not been registered at the start of the season. After limping to the end of the season with Berger alone, BMW revoked the use of their engines, and Schmid folded the ATS team.

=== Comeback with Rial ===
Having established a new brand of wheels with Rial, Schmid would return to Formula One in 1988 with the team of the same name.

=== Later use of ATS cars ===
ATS cars are still currently in use in historic racing events, winning the Historic Grand Prix of Monaco in 2018 with the ATS D4.

== Complete Formula One World Championship results ==
(key) (Results in bold indicate pole position; results in italics indicate fastest lap.)

Year	Chassis	Engines	Tyres	Drivers	1	2	3	4	5	6	7	8	9	10	11	12	13	14	15	16	17	Points	WCC
1977	Penske PC4	Ford Cosworth DFV 3.0 V8	**G**		ARG	BRA	RSA	USW	ESP	MON	BEL	SWE	FRA	GBR	GER	AUT	NED	ITA	USA	CAN	JPN	1	12th
1977	Penske PC4	Ford Cosworth DFV 3.0 V8	**G**	(France) Jean-Pierre Jarier				6	DNQ	11	11	8	Ret	9	Ret	14	Ret	Ret				1	12th
1977	Penske PC4	Ford Cosworth DFV 3.0 V8	**G**	(Germany) Hans Heyer											DSQ*							1	12th
1977	Penske PC4	Ford Cosworth DFV 3.0 V8	**G**	(Austria) Hans Binder												12	8	DNQ				1	12th
1978	HS1; D1	Ford Cosworth DFV 3.0 V8	**G**		ARG	BRA	RSA	USW	MON	BEL	ESP	SWE	FRA	GBR	GER	AUT	NED	ITA	USA	CAN		0	NC
1978	HS1; D1	Ford Cosworth DFV 3.0 V8	**G**	(Germany) Jochen Mass	11	7	Ret	Ret	DNQ	11	9	13	13	NC	Ret	DNQ	DNQ	PO				0	NC
1978	HS1; D1	Ford Cosworth DFV 3.0 V8	**G**	(France) Jean-Pierre Jarier	12	DNS	8	11	DNQ						DNQ							0	NC
1978	HS1; D1	Ford Cosworth DFV 3.0 V8	**G**	(Italy) Alberto Colombo						DNQ	DNQ											0	NC
1978	HS1; D1	Ford Cosworth DFV 3.0 V8	**G**	(Finland) Keke Rosberg								15	16	Ret					Ret	NC		0	NC
1978	HS1; D1	Ford Cosworth DFV 3.0 V8	**G**	(Austria) Hans Binder												DNQ						0	NC
1978	HS1; D1	Ford Cosworth DFV 3.0 V8	**G**	(Netherlands) Michael Bleekemolen													DNQ	DNQ	Ret	DNQ		0	NC
1978	HS1; D1	Ford Cosworth DFV 3.0 V8	**G**	(Austria) Harald Ertl														DNQ				0	NC
1979	D2; D3	Ford Cosworth DFV 3.0 V8	**G**		ARG	BRA	RSA	USW	ESP	BEL	MON	FRA	GBR	GER	AUT	NED	ITA	CAN	USA			2	11th
1979	D2; D3	Ford Cosworth DFV 3.0 V8	**G**	(Germany) Hans-Joachim Stuck	DNQ	Ret	Ret	DSQ	14	8	Ret	DNS	DNQ	Ret	Ret	Ret	11	Ret	5			2	11th
1980	D3; D4	Ford Cosworth DFV 3.0 V8	**G**		ARG	BRA	RSA	USW	BEL	MON	FRA	GBR	GER	AUT	NED	ITA	CAN	USA				0	NC
1980	D3; D4	Ford Cosworth DFV 3.0 V8	**G**	(Switzerland) Marc Surer	Ret	7	DNS				Ret	Ret	12	12	10	Ret	DNQ	8				0	NC
1980	D3; D4	Ford Cosworth DFV 3.0 V8	**G**	(Netherlands) Jan Lammers	DNQ	DNQ	DNQ	Ret	12	NC												0	NC
1980	D3; D4	Ford Cosworth DFV 3.0 V8	**G**	(Austria) Harald Ertl									DNQ									0	NC
1981	D4; HGS1	Ford Cosworth DFV 3.0 V8	**M** **A**		USW	BRA	ARG	SMR	BEL	MON	ESP	FRA	GBR	GER	AUT	NED	ITA	CAN	CPL			1	13th
1981	D4; HGS1	Ford Cosworth DFV 3.0 V8	**M** **A**	(Netherlands) Jan Lammers	Ret	DNQ	12	DNQ														1	13th
1981	D4; HGS1	Ford Cosworth DFV 3.0 V8	**M** **A**	(Sweden) Slim Borgudd				13	DNQ	DNPQ	DNQ	DNQ	6	Ret	Ret	10	Ret	Ret	DNQ			1	13th
1982	D5	Ford Cosworth DFV 3.0 V8	**A** **M**		RSA	BRA	USW	SMR	BEL	MON	DET	CAN	NED	GBR	FRA	GER	AUT	SUI	ITA	CPL		4	12th
1982	D5	Ford Cosworth DFV 3.0 V8	**A** **M**	(Germany) Manfred Winkelhock	10	5	Ret	DSQ	Ret	Ret	Ret	DNQ	12	DNQ	11	Ret	Ret	Ret	DNQ	NC		4	12th
1982	D5	Ford Cosworth DFV 3.0 V8	**A** **M**	(Chile) Eliseo Salazar	9	Ret	Ret	5	Ret	Ret	Ret	Ret	13	DNQ	Ret	Ret	DNQ	14	9	DNQ		4	12th
1983	D6	BMW M12/13 1.5 L4 t	**G**		BRA	USW	FRA	SMR	MON	BEL	DET	CAN	GBR	GER	AUT	NED	ITA	EUR	RSA			0	NC
1983	D6	BMW M12/13 1.5 L4 t	**G**	(Germany) Manfred Winkelhock	15	Ret	Ret	11	Ret	Ret	Ret	9	Ret	DNQ	Ret	DSQ	Ret	8	Ret			0	NC
1984	D7	BMW M12/13 1.5 L4 t	**P**		BRA	RSA	BEL	SMR	FRA	MON	CAN	DET	DAL	GBR	GER	AUT	NED	ITA	EUR	POR		0	NC
1984	D7	BMW M12/13 1.5 L4 t	**P**	(Germany) Manfred Winkelhock	EX	Ret	Ret	Ret	Ret	Ret	8	Ret	8	Ret	Ret	DNS	Ret	DNS				0	NC
1984	D7	BMW M12/13 1.5 L4 t	**P**	(Austria) Gerhard Berger												12		6†	Ret	13		0	NC

* Started illegally, having failed to qualify.
† Ineligible for points.
