= Slim Borgudd =

Swedish race car driver (1946–2023)

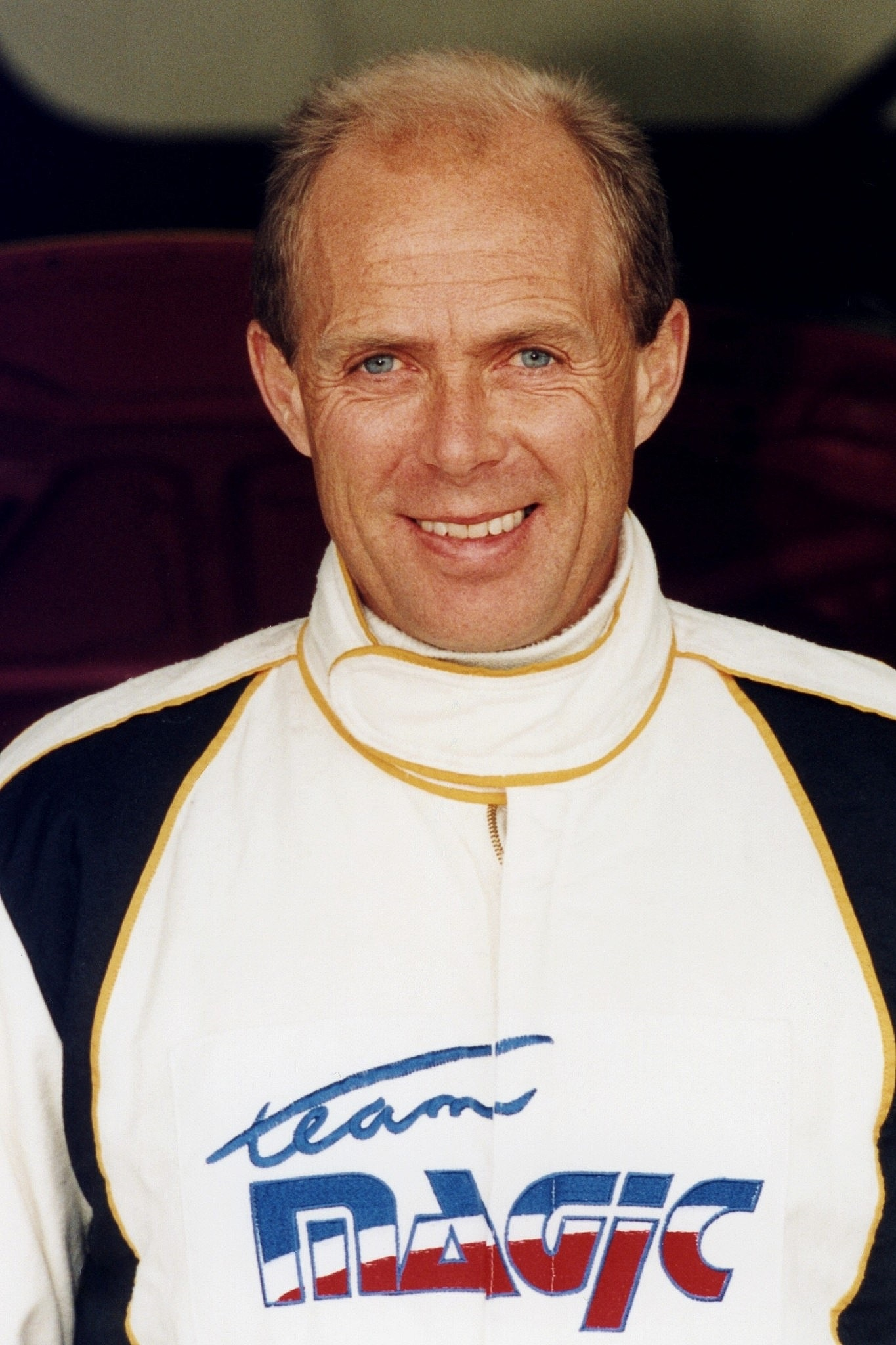
- Borgudd in 1994
- Born: Karl Edvard Tommy Borgudd; 25 November 1946; Borgholm, Sweden
- Died: 23 February 2023 (aged 76)

Formula One World Championship career
- Nationality: (Sweden) Swedish
- Active years: 1981–1982
- Team(s): ATS, Tyrrell
- Entries: 15 (10 starts)
- Championships: 0
- Wins: 0
- Podiums: 0
- Career points: 1
- Pole positions: 0
- Fastest laps: 0
- First entry: 1981 San Marino Grand Prix
- Last entry: 1982 United States Grand Prix West

Karl Edvard Tommy "Slim" Borgudd (Swedish pronunciation: [sliːm ˈbɔ̂ːrjɵd]; 25 November 1946 – 23 February 2023) was a Swedish musician and Formula One driver who raced for the ATS and Tyrrell teams.

== Biography ==
Borgudd was born in Borgholm, Öland, on 25 November 1946.

Borgudd's first career was as a drummer, mainly in jazz-rock, most notably for short-lived groups Lea Riders Group, Made In Sweden and Solar Plexus. He also worked with Björn Ulvaeus's group the Hootenanny Singers.

Borgudd began racing on and off in the mid-1960s with a Lotus Formula Ford car, but his racing career became more serious only in 1972, after taking five wins in five sports car racing club events. Borgudd raced a Hillman Imp and a Volvo 122 in the Swedish Touring Car Championship from 1972 to 1975, finishing as runner-up in 1972, as well as racing in the Scandinavian Formula Ford series, which he won in 1973.

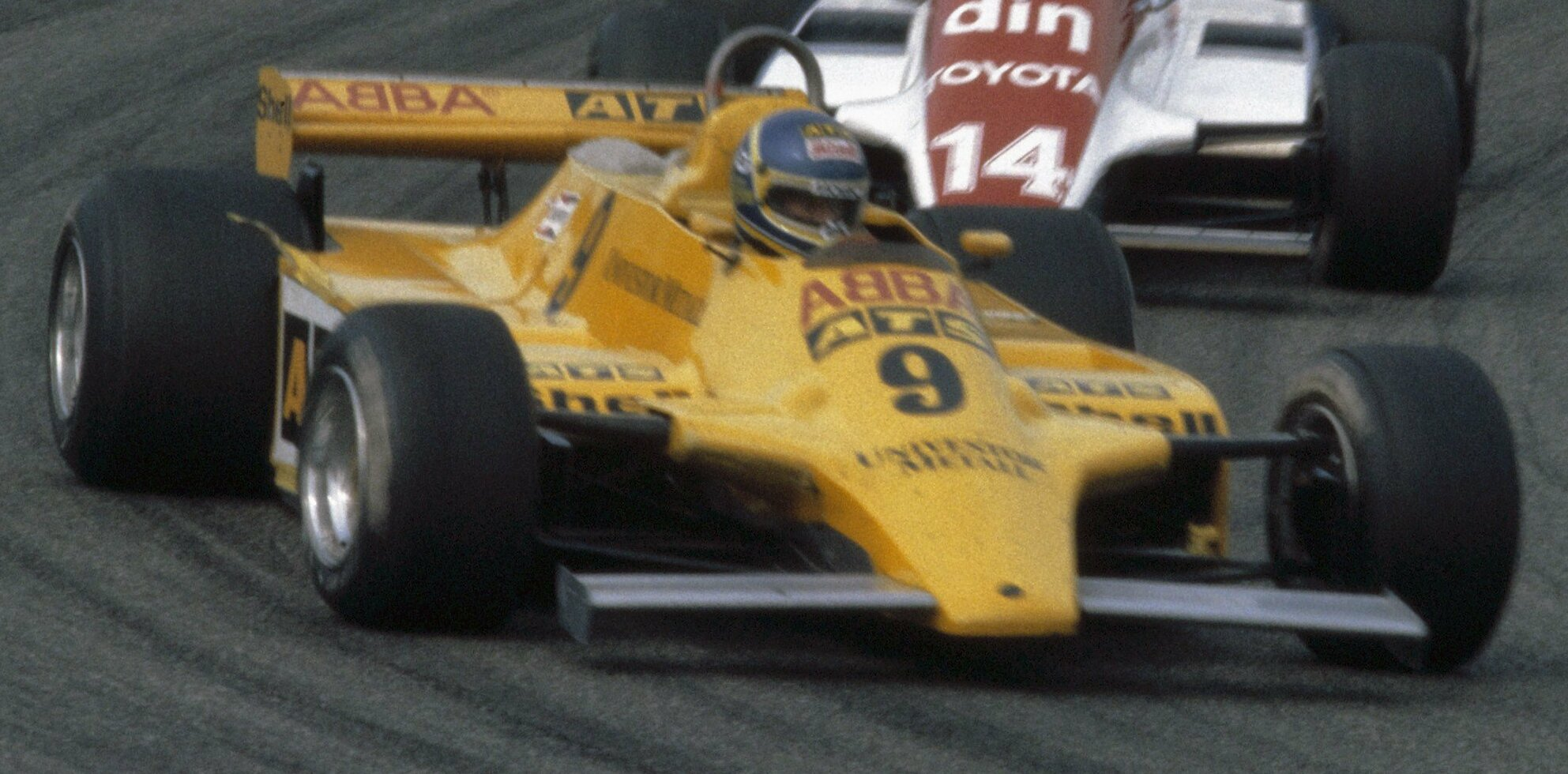
Borgudd driving at the 1981 Dutch Grand Prix

In 1976, Borgudd moved up to Formula 3, racing sporadically until the end of the 1977 season. In 1978, he formed his own team and raced full-time in the Swedish and European series, in an old Ralt-Toyota, which he took to the Swedish championship title in 1979, also finishing third in the European series. Failing to move to Formula 2 in 1980, he raced only in the F3 Monaco Grand Prix, where he reached third place before the bodywork came loose, forcing Borgudd to finish the race holding the body together with one hand.

In 1981, Borgudd, now 34, finally entered Formula 1 in ATS, making his debut in the San Marino Grand Prix, where he outqualified his teammate Jan Lammers. Although there was no cash sponsorship, Borgudd placed the ABBA logo on the car's sidepods, a hopeful move to attract other investors that generated a lot of media interest. Following a run of non-qualifications, Borgudd managed to finish sixth in the British Grand Prix, scoring his first world championship point. In spite of the added morale boost, ATS proved to be an uncompetitive car, and Borgudd failed to score any more points for the rest of the season.

Borgudd's performance in 1981 was solid enough to persuade Ken Tyrrell to hire him to partner Michele Alboreto for 1982. However, Borgudd did not adapt to his new team, and was unceremoniously dumped when his sponsorship money ran out three races into the season.

From 1983 to 1985, Borgudd raced only on occasion, including his taking part in the 1984 and 1985 Macau Grand Prix.

In 1985, Borgudd returned to race in F3000, which had replaced Formula 2. This championship allowed previous years Formula 1 cars, such as the Arrows A6 he drove, finishing tenth in the Vallelunga race. He entered five races that season, but the old F1 cars were not competitive compared to the purposely built F3000 cars.

Although he took part in the 1987 24 Hours of Le Mans, and in 1989 had an outright win in the Willhire 24 Hour, a minor touring car race where he drove a Ford Sierra, Borgudd made his mark in truck racing the following years. In 1986 and 1987, Borgudd was champion in Divisions 2 and 3 of the European Truck Racing Championship, respectively. The following years, success was more fleeting, although the Scandinavian driver managed to finish the 1992 Class B championship in third place.

A switch to the Nordic Touring Car Championship in 1994 saw Borgudd take the championship title. The Mazda team, run by Roger Dowson Engineering made plans to return with Borgudd to the British Touring Car Championship in 1995, but the plan was scrapped.

Also in 1994, Borgudd went back to top form in the Truck Racing Cup, where the Swede barely lost the championship title to British driver Steve Parrish, after a dogfight that lasted the entire season. Borgudd responded in kind in 1995, beating Parrish and Markus Oestreich by a large margin. In 1996 and 1997, Borgudd only finished in fifth and fourth, and he announced his retirement after accusing Mercedes-Benz of favoring other drivers. He made occasional returns to racing at amateur level, having settled down in Coventry.

Borgudd died on 23 February 2023 at age 76.

== Racing record ==
=== Complete Formula One results ===
(key)

Year	Entrant	Chassis	Engine	1	2	3	4	5	6	7	8	9	10	11	12	13	14	15	16	WDC	Points
1981	Team ATS	ATS D4	Cosworth V8	USW	BRA	ARG	SMR; 13													20th	1
1981	Team ATS	ATS HGS1	Cosworth V8					BEL; DNQ	MON; DNPQ	ESP; DNQ	FRA; DNQ	GBR; 6	GER; Ret	AUT; Ret	NED; 10	ITA; Ret	CAN; Ret	CPL; DNQ		20th	1
1982	Team Tyrrell	Tyrrell 011	Cosworth V8	RSA; 16	BRA; 7	USW; 10	SMR	BEL	MON	DET	CAN	NED	GBR	FRA	GER	AUT	SUI	ITA	CPL	NC	0

=== Complete European Formula 3000 results ===
(key) (Races in bold indicate pole position; races in italics indicate fastest lap.)

Year	Entrant	Chassis	Engine	1	2	3	4	5	6	7	8	9	10	11	12	Pos.	Points
1985	Roger Cowman	Arrows A6	Cosworth	SIL	THR; DNQ	EST	NÜR	VAL; 10	PAU	SPA; Ret	DIJ	PER	ÖST	ZAN	DON; Ret	23rd	0

=== Complete 24 Hours of Le Mans results ===
Year	Team	Co-drivers	Car	Class	Laps	Pos.	Class pos.
1987	(Sweden) CEE Sport Racing	(Sweden) Tryggve Gronvall (United States) Ray Ratcliffe	Tiga GC286	C2	-	DNQ	DNQ

=== Complete British Touring Car Championship results ===
(key) (Races in bold indicate pole position in class) (Races in italics indicate fastest lap in class)

Year	Team	Car	Class	1	2	3	4	5	6	7	8	9	10	11	12	13	Overall Pos	Pts	Class Pos
1990	Labatt's Team	Ford Sierra RS500	A	OUL	DON; Ret‡	THR	SIL	OUL	SIL	BRH ovr:2‡ cls:2‡	SNE	BRH	BIR	DON	THR	SIL	NC	0	NC

‡ Endurance driver – not eligible for points

Sporting positions
Preceded by Anders Olofsson	Swedish Formula Three Champion; 1979	Succeeded by Thorbjörn Carlsson
Preceded by Per-Gunnar Andersson	Nordic Touring Car Championship; Champion; 1994	Succeeded by Per-Gunnar Andersson
