= Penske PC4 =

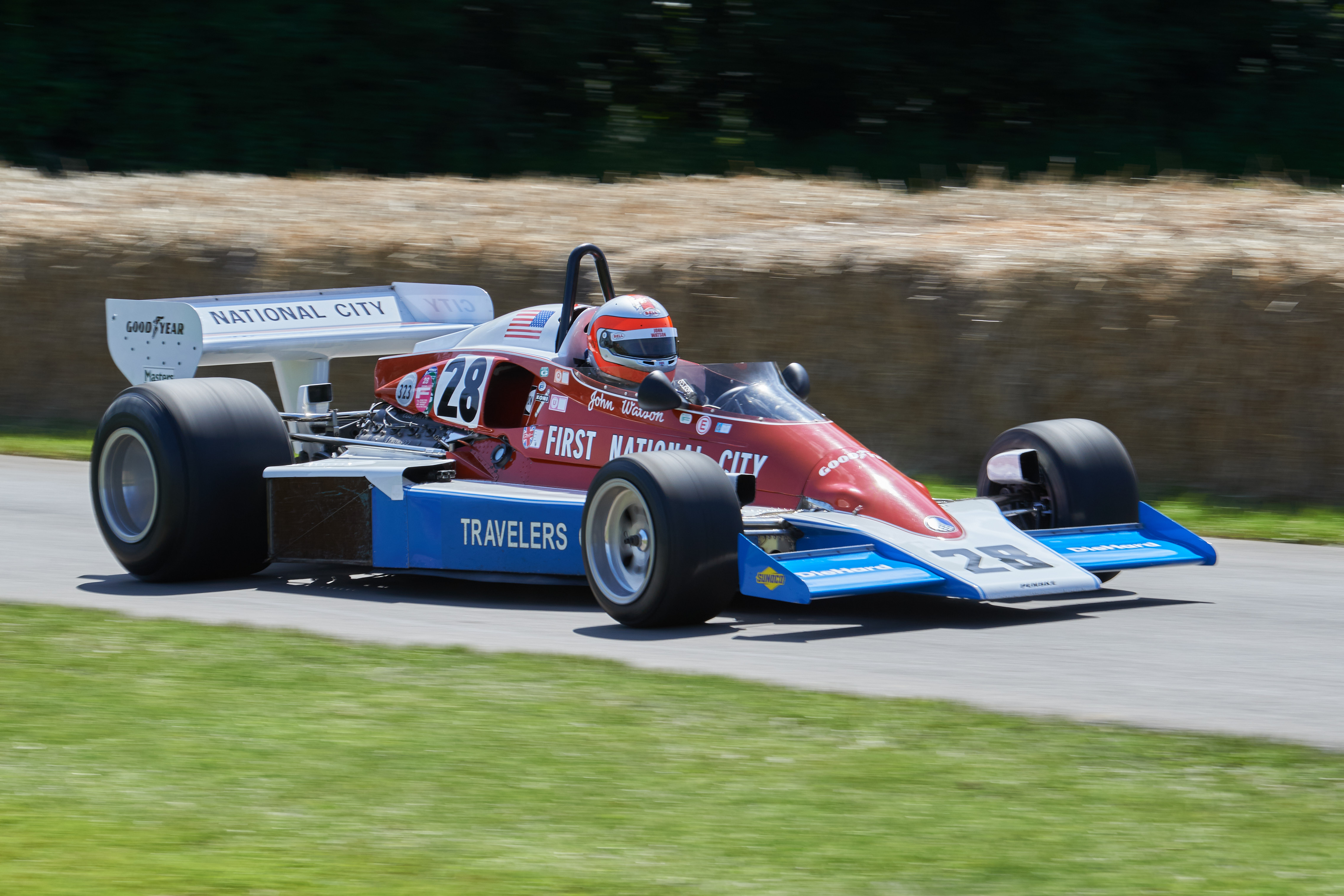
- A Penske PC4 being demonstrated by John Watson at the Goodwood Festival of Speed 2021
- Category: Formula One
- Constructor: Team Penske
- Designer: Geoff Ferris
- Predecessor: PC3

Technical specifications
- Chassis: Aluminium monocoque
- Axle track: Front: 1,422 mm (56.0 in); Rear: 1,473 mm (58.0 in)
- Wheelbase: 2,692 mm (106.0 in)
- Engine: Cosworth DFV NA
- Transmission: Hewland DG 400 5-speed manual
- Weight: 620 kg (1,370 lb)
- Fuel: 1976: Sunoco; 1977: Valvoline
- Tyres: Goodyear

Competition history
- Notable entrants: Citibank Team Penske; ATS Racing; Interscope Racing
- Notable drivers: (United Kingdom) John Watson (France) Jean-Pierre Jarier
- Debut: 1976 Swedish Grand Prix
Races	Wins	Poles	F/Laps
22	1	0	0
- Constructors' Championships: 0
- Drivers' Championships: 0

The Penske PC4 was a Formula One car used by Team Penske during the 1976 and was driven to victory in that year's Austrian Grand Prix by John Watson, scoring the last win for an American-licensed constructor in a Formula One race and, excluding the Indianapolis 500, also one of only two wins of an American-licensed constructor in Formula One. It was used for most of the following season by ATS Racing and Interscope Racing also used the PC4 for two races that year.

== Development ==
The Penske PC4 was designed by Geoff Ferris. It featured a low monocoque tub with hip radiators. After a poor debut in Sweden, its aerodynamics were revised and the wheelbase extended. Three chassis were built by Team Penske during the course of the 1976 season.

== Racing history ==
Team Penske used the PC3 for the first six races of the season, but for the Swedish Grand Prix the PC4 was introduced. The team's sole driver, John Watson, qualified the new car 17th on the grid but crashed on the first lap of the race when its throttle became stuck. Following aerodynamic revisions and a lengthening of the wheel base, the PC4 proved to be quite competitive. Watson fared much better at the following race in France, when he took the car to third place, having started eighth. He followed this up with another third in Britain. He scored both his and Penske's maiden win in Austria, having qualified second. Another point was scored in the United States, where Watson finished sixth.

A total of 18 points were scored with the PC4, and with two points scored with the PC3, the Penske team placed fifth in the Constructor's Championship, with Watson 7th in the Driver's Championship. Penske withdrew from Formula One at the end of the season, the team opting to focus on Indycar racing.

=== ATS Racing ===
German industrialist Günter Schmid brought the Penske PC4 chassis for his newly formed ATS Racing team, set up to participate in the 1977 Formula One season. The team initially fielded a single entry for Jean-Pierre Jarier. He scored a point for sixth place in the team's debut race in the United States. His ninth on the grid at that race was the team's best qualifying with the PC4, which would usually place in the lower half of the grid. The team expanded to two entries later in the season and Hans Heyer made a one-off appearance in the German Grand Prix, famously driving despite failing to qualify. Hans Binder took over for the next three races, qualifying for two of them. ATS discarded its PC4s following the introduction of its own chassis, the ATS HS1, for the final three races of the year.

=== Interscope Racing ===
Ted Field's Interscope Racing ran a PC4 for Danny Ongais at the tail end of the 1977 season. Ongais managed a best of seventh from the two races entered.

== Complete Formula One World Championship results ==
(key) (Results in bold indicate pole position; results in italics indicate fastest lap.)

Year	Entrants	Engines	Tyres	Drivers	1	2	3	4	5	6	7	8	9	10	11	12	13	14	15	16	17	Points	WCC
1976	Citibank Team Penske	Ford Cosworth DFV 3.0 V8	G		BRA	RSA	USW	ESP	BEL	MON	SWE	FRA	GBR	GER	AUT	NED	ITA	CAN	USE	JPN		20^{1}	5th^{1}
1976	Citibank Team Penske	Ford Cosworth DFV 3.0 V8	G	John Watson							Ret	3	3	7	1	Ret	11	10	6	Ret		20^{1}	5th^{1}
1977	ATS Racing	Ford Cosworth DFV 3.0 V8	G		ARG	BRA	RSA	USW	ESP	MON	BEL	SWE	FRA	GBR	GER	AUT	NED	ITA	USE	CAN	JPN	1	12th
1977	ATS Racing	Ford Cosworth DFV 3.0 V8	G	Jean-Pierre Jarier				6	DNQ	11	11	8	Ret	9	Ret	14	Ret	Ret				1	12th
1977	ATS Racing	Ford Cosworth DFV 3.0 V8	G	Hans Heyer											DSQ							1	12th
1977	ATS Racing	Ford Cosworth DFV 3.0 V8	G	Hans Binder												12	18	DNQ				1	12th
1977	Interscope Racing	Ford Cosworth DFV 3.0 V8	G	Danny Ongais															Ret	7		1	12th

^1 2 points scored in 1976 with the Penske PC3.
