= Gustav Brunner =

Austrian engineer and car designer (born 1950)

- Born: 12 September 1950 (age 75); Graz, Austria
- Occupations: Formula One designer and engineer.

Gustav Brunner (born 12 September 1950) is an Austrian Formula One designer and engineer.

== Career ==
Born in Graz, he started his career in racing car design at the German-based constructor McNamara. He first entered F1 in a brief spell working for the ATS team in 1978, before designing cars for Formula Two and sportscar racing. He came to prominence in Formula One in 1983, by returning to ATS. He designed two chassis for the team, the 1983 D6 and the 1984 D7, before quitting after a number of arguments with team principal Günter Schmid. In 1985 he joined RAM Racing, designing the RAM 03 car. By this time he was gaining a reputation within the sport for designing good chassis on a limited budget, even if the teams he had worked for had a conspicuous lack of results.

He then worked for Arrows and Ferrari, working for the latter on their F1/87 car, before reuniting with ATS boss Schmid as designer for his new Rial F1 outfit in 1988. He fell out with Schmid again and became Technical Director of the Zakspeed team. When the team folded at the end of the 1989 season, he moved on to Leyton House, where he worked on the March CG891 and stayed on as they reverted to March Engineering.

When March Engineering folded, he moved to Minardi for 1993, designing their successful M193 chassis, before another switch, to Ferrari's Research & Development department, eventually returning to Minardi as chief designer in 1997 to help new technical director, Gabriele Tredozi, and became the technical director in 1999.

Following three successive seasons where his Minardi designs had been praised for their innovative design considering such small resources, he was head-hunted by Toyota to become their Technical Director for their new Formula One team in 2001. He left Toyota at the end of 2005.
