= ATS D2 =

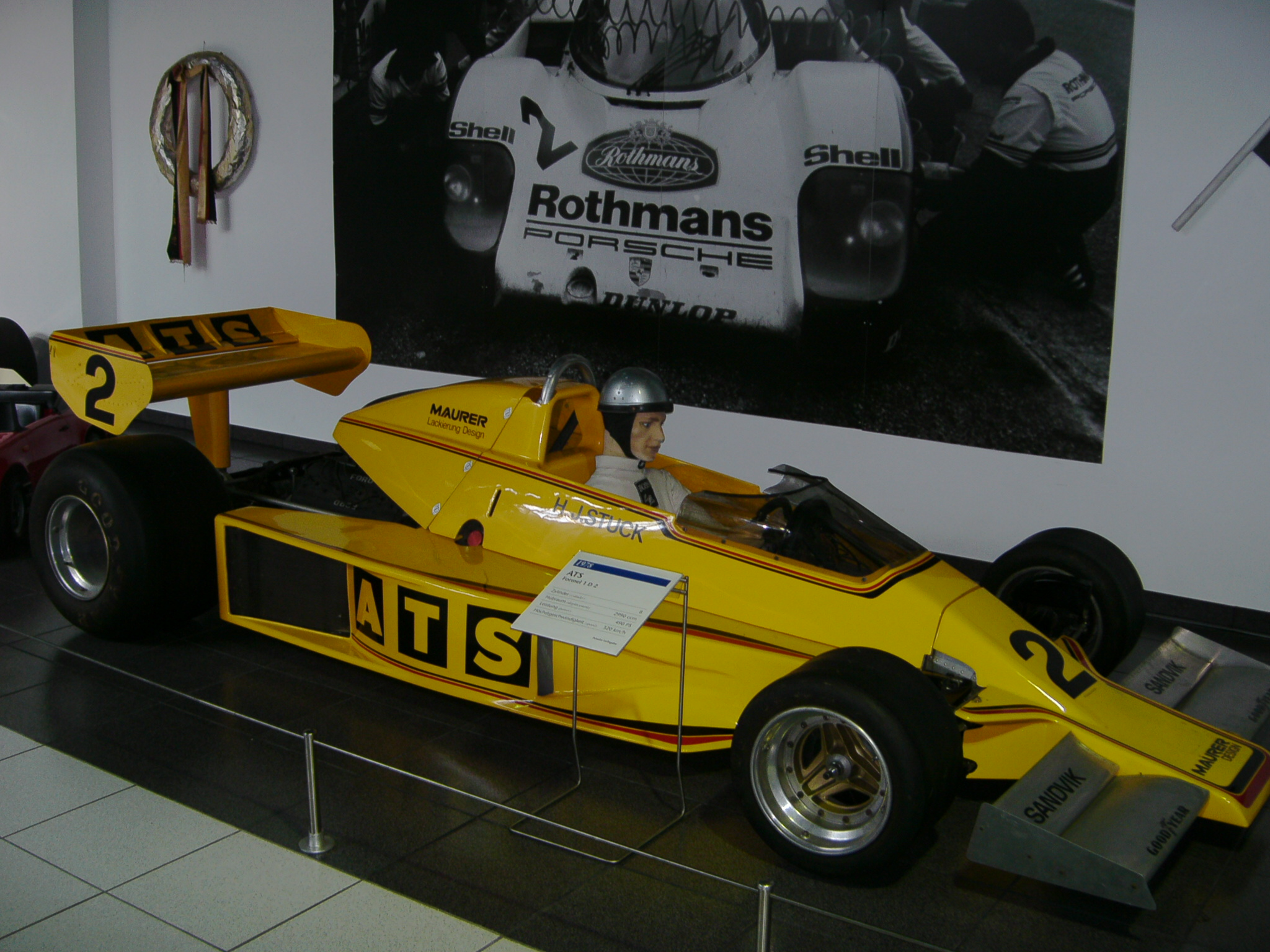
- Category: Formula One
- Constructor: ATS
- Designers: John Gentry (Technical Director); Giocomo Caliri (Chief Designer)
- Predecessor: D1
- Successor: D3

Technical specifications
- Chassis: Aluminium alloy monocoque
- Axle track: Front: 1,600 mm (63 in); Rear: 1,600 mm (63 in)
- Wheelbase: 2,731 mm (107.5 in)
- Engine: Ford-Cosworth DFV 2,993 cc (182.6 cu in), 90° V8, NA, mid-engine, longitudinally mounted
- Transmission: Hewland FGA400 5-speed manual
- Weight: 590 kg (1,300 lb)
- Fuel: Shell
- Tyres: Goodyear

Competition history
- Notable entrants: ATS Wheels
- Notable drivers: (Germany) Hans-Joachim Stuck
- Debut: 1979 Brazilian Grand Prix
Races	Wins	Poles	F/Laps
7	0	0	0
- Constructors' Championships: 0
- Drivers' Championships: 0

The ATS D2 was a Formula One racing car manufactured and raced by the ATS Wheels racing team for most of the 1979 Formula One season. It was powered by a Cosworth DFV V8 engine. Driven by Hans-Joachim Stuck, the D2 failed to finish any races in the points. It was superseded by the ATS D3 from the Austrian Grand Prix.

== Development ==
The D2 was designed by John Gentry and Giocomo Caliri, the latter of whom had previously worked for Ferrari. Utilising an aluminium monocoque, the D2 was powered by a Cosworth DFV V8.

== Racing history ==
ATS entered the season with a single car entry for German driver Hans-Joachim Stuck. The D2 was generally unreliable and Stuck finished only two races from the seven that he qualified for (he failed to qualify for the season opening race in Argentina and also the British Grand Prix). Stuck's best race was in Belgium where he finished 8th, having started 20th on the grid. He usually qualified on the back three rows of the grid but in Monaco he managed to qualify 12th.

From the Austrian Grand Prix, the ATS team switched to a new car, the ATS D3.

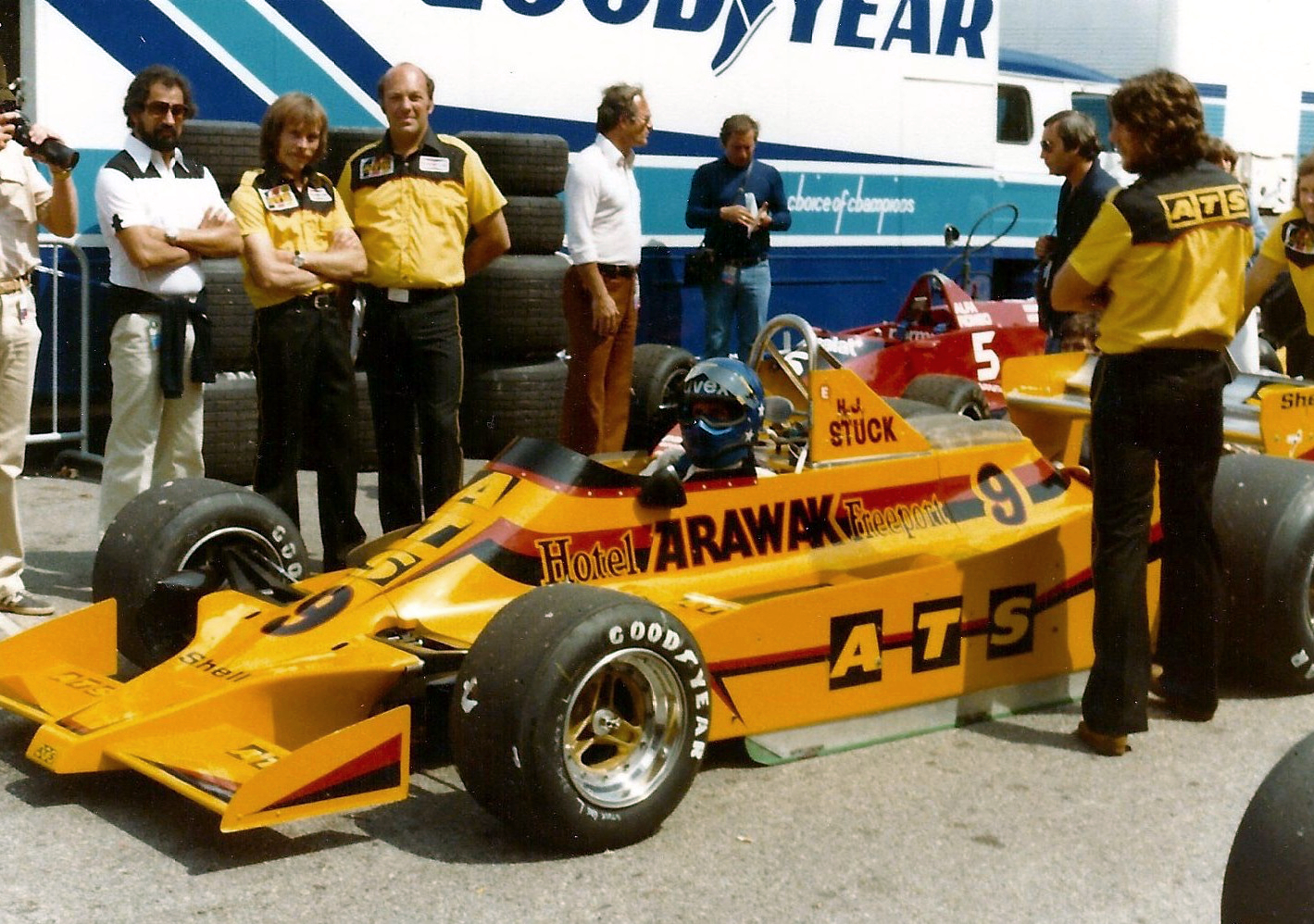
Hans-Joachim Stuck in an ATS D2 car at the 1979 Monaco Grand Prix.

== Complete Formula One World Championship results ==
(key) (Results in bold indicate pole position; results in italics indicate fastest lap)

Year	Entrant	Engine	Tyres	Drivers	1	2	3	4	5	6	7	8	9	10	11	12	13	14	15	Points	WCC
1979	ATS Wheels	Ford Cosworth DFV	**G**		ARG	BRA	RSA	USW	ESP	BEL	MON	FRA	GBR	GER	AUT	NED	ITA	CAN	USA	**2***	**11th**
1979	ATS Wheels	Ford Cosworth DFV	**G**	(Germany) Hans-Joachim Stuck	DNQ	Ret	Ret	DSQ	14	8	Ret	DNS	DNQ	Ret						**2***	**11th**

* All points scored with the ATS D3
