= 1984 Italian Grand Prix =

- Race 14 of 16 in the 1984 Formula One World Championship
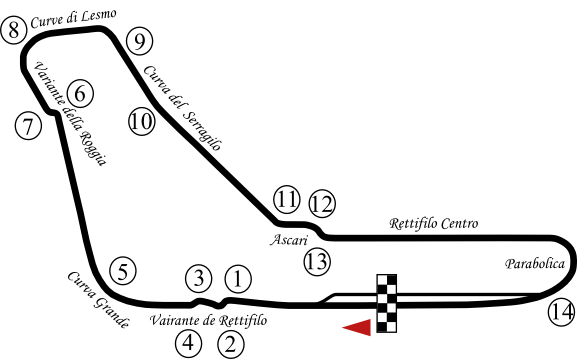

Race details
- Date: 9 September 1984
- Official name: 55º Gran Premio d'Italia
- Location: Autodromo Nazionale di Monza; Monza, Lombardy, Italy
- Course: Permanent racing facility
- Course length: 5.800 km (3.604 miles)
- Distance: 51 laps, 295.800 km (183.802 miles)
- Weather: Dry

Pole position
Driver	(Brazil) Nelson Piquet	Brabham-BMW
- Time: 1:26.584

Fastest lap
Driver	(Austria) Niki Lauda	McLaren-TAG
- Time: 1:31.912 on lap 42

Podium
First	(Austria) Niki Lauda	McLaren-TAG
Second	(Italy) Michele Alboreto	Ferrari
Third	(Italy) Riccardo Patrese	Alfa Romeo

The 1984 Italian Grand Prix was a Formula One motor race held at Monza on 9 September 1984. It was the fourteenth race of the 1984 Formula One World Championship.

The 51-lap race was won by Austrian Niki Lauda, driving a McLaren-TAG, with local drivers Michele Alboreto and Riccardo Patrese second and third in a Ferrari and an Alfa Romeo respectively. With teammate Alain Prost retiring, Lauda opened up a 10.5-point lead over the Frenchman in the Drivers' Championship with two races remaining.

== Pre-race ==
In the fortnight between the Dutch and Italian Grands Prix, the FIA Court of Appeal upheld the exclusion of the Tyrrell team from the championship for alleged technical infringements, and the team were duly banned from the final three races of the season. The Italian Grand Prix would thus be the first all-turbo Formula One race in history.

Meanwhile, the Toleman team had suspended Ayrton Senna for not informing them of his signing for Lotus for 1985 before the deal was announced at Zandvoort. Stefan Johansson, out of a drive as a result of Tyrrell's ban, was drafted in to replace the Brazilian at Monza; he would be joined by newcomer Pierluigi Martini.

== Qualifying ==
=== Qualifying report ===
Nelson Piquet took his seventh pole position of the season in his Brabham, with Alain Prost alongside him on the front row in his McLaren. The second row was made up of Elio de Angelis in the Lotus and Niki Lauda in the second McLaren, while the third row consisted of Teo Fabi in the second Brabham and Keke Rosberg in the Williams. The second Lotus of Nigel Mansell, the Renault of Patrick Tambay and the two Alfa Romeos of Riccardo Patrese and Eddie Cheever completed the top ten. Johansson was 17th in the Toleman while Martini, unfamiliar with the car, came 27th and last and thus failed to qualify.

=== Qualifying classification ===
Pos	No	Driver	Constructor	Q1	Q2	Gap
1	1	(Brazil) Nelson Piquet	Brabham-BMW	1:28.709	1:26.584	
2	7	(France) Alain Prost	McLaren-TAG	1:29.854	1:26.671	+0.087
3	11	(Italy) Elio de Angelis	Lotus-Renault	1:28.014	1:27.538	+0.954
4	8	(Austria) Niki Lauda	McLaren-TAG	1:30.142	1:28.533	+1.949
5	2	(Italy) Teo Fabi	Brabham-BMW	1:29.383	1:28.587	+2.003
6	6	(Finland) Keke Rosberg	Williams-Honda	1:33.386	1:28.818	+2.234
7	12	(United Kingdom) Nigel Mansell	Lotus-Renault	1:31.715	1:28.969	+2.385
8	15	(France) Patrick Tambay	Renault	1:31.532	1:29.253	+2.669
9	22	(Italy) Riccardo Patrese	Alfa Romeo	1:30.710	1:29.382	+2.798
10	23	(United States) Eddie Cheever	Alfa Romeo	1:32.365	1:29.797	+3.213
11	27	(Italy) Michele Alboreto	Ferrari	1:29.810	1:30.069	+3.226
12	16	(United Kingdom) Derek Warwick	Renault	1:30.113	1:30.569	+3.529
13	5	(France) Jacques Laffite	Williams-Honda	1:32.091	1:30.578	+3.994
14	28	(France) René Arnoux	Ferrari	1:31.495	1:30.695	+4.111
15	17	(Switzerland) Marc Surer	Arrows-BMW	1:31.108	1:31.513	+4.524
16	26	(Italy) Andrea de Cesaris	Ligier-Renault	1:32.014	1:31.198	+4.614
17	19	(Sweden) Stefan Johansson	Toleman-Hart	1:31.207	1:31.203	+4.619
18	25	(France) François Hesnault	Ligier-Renault	1:32.779	1:31.274	+4.690
19	18	(Belgium) Thierry Boutsen	Arrows-BMW	1:32.636	1:31.342	+4.758
20	31	(Austria) Gerhard Berger	ATS-BMW	1:33.161	1:31.549	+4.965
21	14	(West Germany) Manfred Winkelhock	ATS-BMW	2:00.593	1:32.866	+6.282
22	24	(Italy) Piercarlo Ghinzani	Osella-Alfa Romeo	1:33.456	1:33.562	+6.872
23	9	(France) Philippe Alliot	RAM-Hart	1:37.186	1:34.120	+7.536
24	30	(Austria) Jo Gartner	Osella-Alfa Romeo	1:37.123	1:34.472	+7.888
25	21	(Netherlands) Huub Rothengatter	Spirit-Hart	1:38.255	1:34.719	+8.135
26	10	(United Kingdom) Jonathan Palmer	RAM-Hart	1:36.876	1:35.412	+8.828
DNQ	20	(Italy) Pierluigi Martini	Toleman-Hart	1:38.312	1:35.840	+9.256

== Race ==
=== Race report ===
Manfred Winkelhock, who had qualified 21st in his ATS, suffered a gearbox failure on the formation lap for the second time in three races. Frustrated, he subsequently quit the team.

At the start, de Angelis passed Prost and Piquet, though the Brabham driver retook the lead into the first chicane. Tambay also made a fast start to run fourth, while Lauda fell to seventh behind Mansell and Fabi. While Piquet set about building a lead, Prost and Tambay overtook de Angelis, only for Prost's engine to fail on the fourth lap. In the meantime, Fabi and Lauda passed both Lotuses, and were thus up to third and fourth.

On lap 8, Fabi spun at the Roggia chicane, dropping to eighth; a charge put him back up to fourth by lap 12. By this point, Michele Alboreto in the Ferrari had also passed both Lotuses and was now fifth. While this was going on, a high attrition rate was building: the second Ferrari of René Arnoux suffered a gearbox failure on lap 6, while the two Ligiers of Andrea de Cesaris and François Hesnault dropped out on lap 8, followed shortly afterwards by the two Williams of Rosberg and Jacques Laffite. By lap 15 the two Lotuses had also retired, Mansell spinning off and de Angelis' gearbox failing.

Piquet continued to lead from Tambay, both clear of Lauda. On lap 16, Piquet's engine failed; at around the same time Fabi, continuing his charge, overtook Lauda to run second. Fabi then started to catch up to Tambay and by half-distance was on the Renault's tail, with Lauda keeping close behind; all three were clear of Alboreto, with Derek Warwick in the second Renault up to fifth and Cheever sixth. On lap 32, Warwick suffered an oil pressure problem, moving Johansson into the top six.

On lap 40, Lauda overtook Fabi at the Parabolica, before passing Tambay for the lead at the Roggia three laps later. Then, on lap 44, Fabi and Tambay suffered engine and throttle failures respectively. This left Lauda with a lead of 20 seconds over Alboreto, with Cheever up to third followed by Johansson, Patrese and the Osella of Piercarlo Ghinzani. On lap 46 Cheever ran out of fuel, followed three laps later by Ghinzani; meanwhile, Patrese passed Johansson for third. At the chequered flag, only Lauda and Alboreto were on the lead lap, with Patrese one lap behind Lauda and Johansson a further lap back. Completing the top six were Jo Gartner in the second Osella and Gerhard Berger in the second ATS, though neither driver would receive points as both their teams had officially entered only one car for the championship.

The win, Lauda's fifth of the season, put him 10.5 points clear of Prost at the top of the Drivers' Championship with two races remaining. In the Constructors' Championship, Alboreto's result enabled Ferrari to move ahead of Lotus into second behind McLaren. As of 2024, Riccardo Patrese's third place was the final Formula One podium for Alfa Romeo.

=== Race classification ===
Pos	No	Driver	Constructor	Laps	Time/Retired	Grid	Points
1	8	(Austria) Niki Lauda	McLaren-TAG	51	1:20:29.065	4	9
2	27	(Italy) Michele Alboreto	Ferrari	51	+ 24.249	11	6
3	22	(Italy) Riccardo Patrese	Alfa Romeo	50	+ 1 Lap	9	4
4	19	(Sweden) Stefan Johansson	Toleman-Hart	49	+ 2 Laps	17	3
5	30	(Austria) Jo Gartner	Osella-Alfa Romeo	49	+ 2 Laps	24	0*
6	31	(Austria) Gerhard Berger	ATS-BMW	49	+ 2 Laps	20	0*
7	24	(Italy) Piercarlo Ghinzani	Osella-Alfa Romeo	48	Out of fuel	22	
8	21	(Netherlands) Huub Rothengatter	Spirit-Hart	48	+ 3 Laps	25	
9	23	(United States) Eddie Cheever	Alfa Romeo	45	Out of fuel	10	
10	18	(Belgium) Thierry Boutsen	Arrows-BMW	45	+ 6 Laps	19	
Ret	15	(France) Patrick Tambay	Renault	43	Throttle	8	
Ret	2	(Italy) Teo Fabi	Brabham-BMW	43	Engine	5	
Ret	17	(Switzerland) Marc Surer	Arrows-BMW	43	Engine	15	
Ret	16	(United Kingdom) Derek Warwick	Renault	31	Oil pressure	12	
Ret	10	(United Kingdom) Jonathan Palmer	RAM-Hart	20	Oil pressure	26	
Ret	1	(Brazil) Nelson Piquet	Brabham-BMW	15	Engine	1	
Ret	11	(Italy) Elio de Angelis	Lotus-Renault	14	Gearbox	3	
Ret	12	(United Kingdom) Nigel Mansell	Lotus-Renault	13	Spun off	7	
Ret	5	(France) Jacques Laffite	Williams-Honda	10	Turbo	13	
Ret	6	(Finland) Keke Rosberg	Williams-Honda	8	Turbo	6	
Ret	26	(Italy) Andrea de Cesaris	Ligier-Renault	7	Engine	16	
Ret	25	(France) François Hesnault	Ligier-Renault	7	Spun off	18	
Ret	9	(France) Philippe Alliot	RAM-Hart	6	Electrical	23	
Ret	28	(France) René Arnoux	Ferrari	5	Gearbox	14	
Ret	7	(France) Alain Prost	McLaren-TAG	3	Engine	2	
DNS	14	(West Germany) Manfred Winkelhock	ATS-BMW	0	Gearbox	21	

* Neither Gartner nor Berger were eligible for points, as they were driving the respective "second entries" of Osella and ATS and both teams had officially entered only one car for the entire championship.

== Championship standings after the race ==
Drivers' Championship standings

Pos	Driver	Points
1	(Austria) Niki Lauda	63
2	(France) Alain Prost	52.5
3	(Italy) Elio de Angelis	29.5
4	(France) René Arnoux	24.5
5	(Brazil) Nelson Piquet	24

Constructors' Championship standings

Pos	Constructor	Points
1	(United Kingdom) McLaren-TAG	115.5
2	(Italy) Ferrari	45.5
3	(United Kingdom) Lotus-Renault	42.5
4	(France) Renault	33
5	(United Kingdom) Brabham-BMW	32

- Note: Only the top five positions are included for both sets of standings. Points accurate at final declaration of results. Tyrrell's points were subsequently reallocated.

Previous race: 1984 Dutch Grand Prix	FIA Formula One World Championship; 1984 season	Next race: 1984 European Grand Prix
Previous race: 1983 Italian Grand Prix	Italian Grand Prix	Next race: 1985 Italian Grand Prix
