= 1981 Dutch Grand Prix =

- Race 12 of 15 in the 1981 Formula One World Championship
- The Zandvoort Circuit (1980–1989)

Race details
- Date: 30 August 1981
- Official name: XXVIII Grote Prijs van Nederland
- Location: Circuit Zandvoort, Zandvoort, Netherlands
- Course: Permanent racing facility
- Course length: 4.252 km (2.642 miles)
- Distance: 72 laps, 306.144 km (190.229 miles)
- Weather: Sunny, dry

Pole position
Driver	(France) Alain Prost	Renault
- Time: 1:18.176

Fastest lap
Driver	(Australia) Alan Jones	Williams-Ford
- Time: 1:21.83 on lap 15

Podium
First	(France) Alain Prost	Renault
Second	(Brazil) Nelson Piquet	Brabham-Ford
Third	(Australia) Alan Jones	Williams-Ford

The 1981 Dutch Grand Prix was a Formula One motor race held at Zandvoort on 30 August 1981. It was the twelfth race of the 1981 Formula One World Championship.

The 72-lap race was won from pole position by Alain Prost, driving a Renault. Nelson Piquet finished second in a Brabham-Ford, with Alan Jones third in a Williams-Ford. With Carlos Reutemann failing to finish in the other Williams-Ford after colliding with Jacques Laffite's Ligier-Matra, Piquet moved into the lead of the Drivers' Championship, with the same number of points as Reutemann but more wins.

== Qualifying report ==
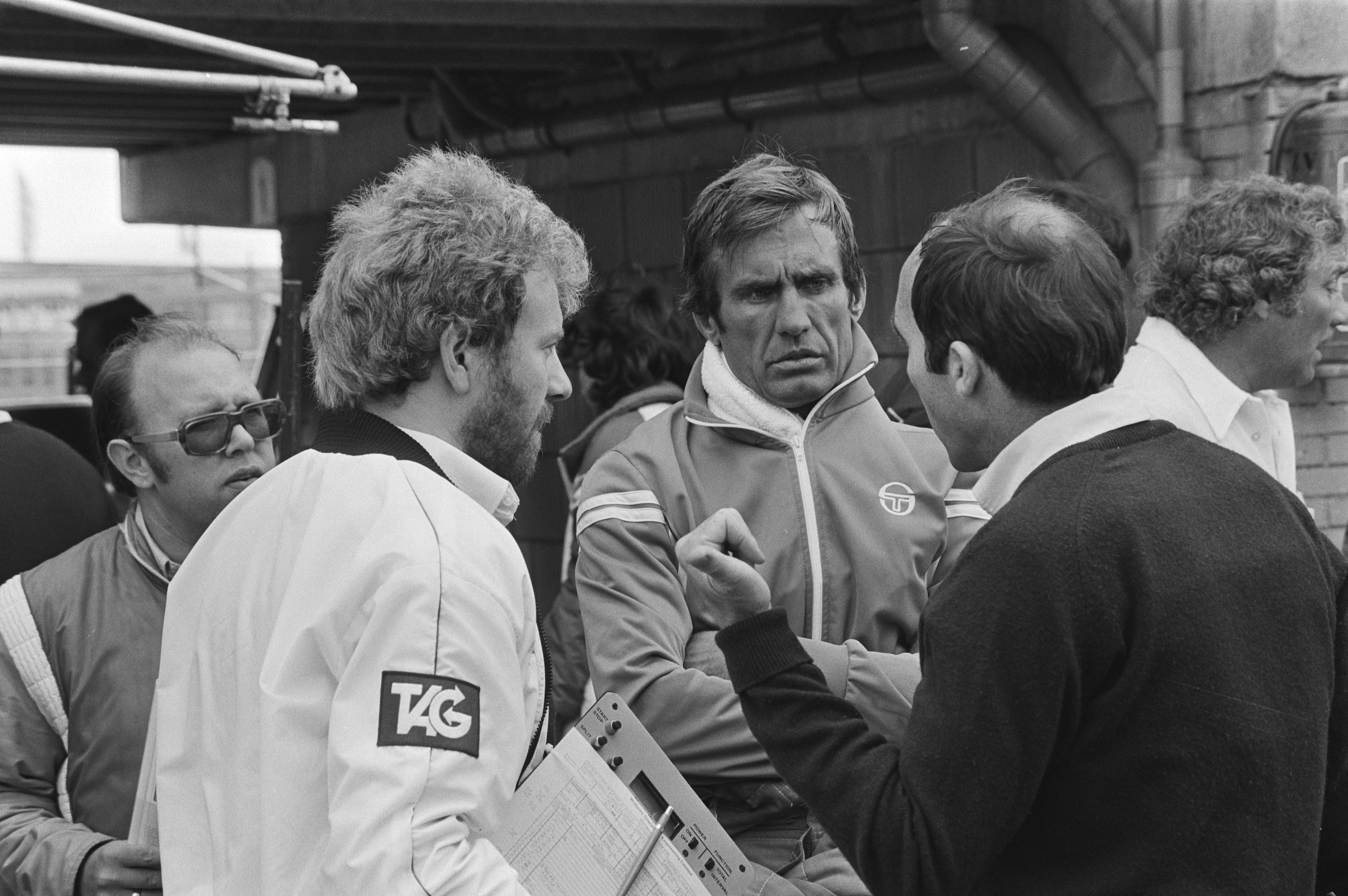
Williams team principal Frank Williams (right) talks with Carlos Reutemann (centre) during the practice session.

The Fittipaldi team returned after missing the previous race in Austria due to a lack of engines. However both their drivers, Keke Rosberg and Chico Serra, failed to qualify.

For the fourth consecutive race, the Renaults filled the front row, with Alain Prost 0.079 seconds ahead of René Arnoux. Nelson Piquet was third in his Brabham, followed by the two Williams of Alan Jones and Carlos Reutemann and the Ligier of Jacques Laffite. The top ten was completed by Mario Andretti in the Alfa Romeo, John Watson in the McLaren, Elio de Angelis in the Lotus and Riccardo Patrese in the Arrows.

=== Qualifying classification ===
Pos	No	Driver	Constructor	Q1	Q2	Gap
1	15	(France) Alain Prost	Renault	1:18.279	1:18.176	
2	16	(France) René Arnoux	Renault	1:18.255	1:18.301	+0.079
3	5	(Brazil) Nelson Piquet	Brabham-Ford	1:19.236	1:18.652	+0.476
4	1	(Australia) Alan Jones	Williams-Ford	1:18.672	1:19.133	+0.496
5	2	(Argentina) Carlos Reutemann	Williams-Ford	1:19.067	1:18.844	+0.668
6	26	(France) Jacques Laffite	Ligier-Matra	1:19.386	1:19.018	+0.842
7	22	(United States) Mario Andretti	Alfa Romeo	1:19.896	1:19.040	+0.864
8	7	(United Kingdom) John Watson	McLaren-Ford	1:19.312	1:19.651	+1.136
9	11	(Italy) Elio de Angelis	Lotus-Ford	1:21.662	1:19.738	+1.562
10	29	(Italy) Riccardo Patrese	Arrows-Ford	1:21.010	1:19.864	+1.688
11	25	(France) Patrick Tambay	Ligier-Matra	1:20.802	1:19.979	+1.803
12	28	(France) Didier Pironi	Ferrari	1:21.293	1:20.248	+2.072
13	8	(Italy) Andrea de Cesaris	McLaren-Ford	1:20.651	1:20.377	+2.201
14	23	(Italy) Bruno Giacomelli	Alfa Romeo	1:20.384	1:20.495	+2.208
15	6	(Mexico) Héctor Rebaque	Brabham-Ford	1:20.547	1:20.872	+2.371
16	27	(Canada) Gilles Villeneuve	Ferrari	1:21.049	1:20.595	+2.419
17	12	(United Kingdom) Nigel Mansell	Lotus-Ford	1:21.106	1:20.663	+2.487
18	32	(France) Jean-Pierre Jarier	Osella-Ford	1:21.086	1:21.294	+2.910
19	17	(Republic of Ireland) Derek Daly	March-Ford	1:22.274	1:21.391	+3.215
20	33	(Switzerland) Marc Surer	Theodore-Ford	1:22.389	1:21.454	+3.278
21	30	(Italy) Siegfried Stohr	Arrows-Ford	1:21.568	1:21.713	+3.392
22	3	(United States) Eddie Cheever	Tyrrell-Ford	1:21.849	1:21.698	+3.522
23	9	(Sweden) Slim Borgudd	ATS-Ford	1:21.760	1:22.302	+3.584
24	14	(Chile) Eliseo Salazar	Ensign-Ford	1:22.382	1:22.024	+3.848
25	4	(Italy) Michele Alboreto	Tyrrell-Ford	1:25.976	1:22.030	+3.854
DNQ	35	(United Kingdom) Brian Henton	Toleman-Hart	1:22.226	1:24.167	+4.050
DNQ	20	(Finland) Keke Rosberg	Fittipaldi-Ford	1:23.518	6:09.795	+5.342
DNQ	21	(Brazil) Chico Serra	Fittipaldi-Ford	1:23.677	1:23.613	+5.437
DNQ	31	(Italy) Beppe Gabbiani	Osella-Ford	no time	1:23.898	+5.722
DNQ	36	(United Kingdom) Derek Warwick	Toleman-Hart	1:25.104	1:24.028	+5.852

== Race report ==
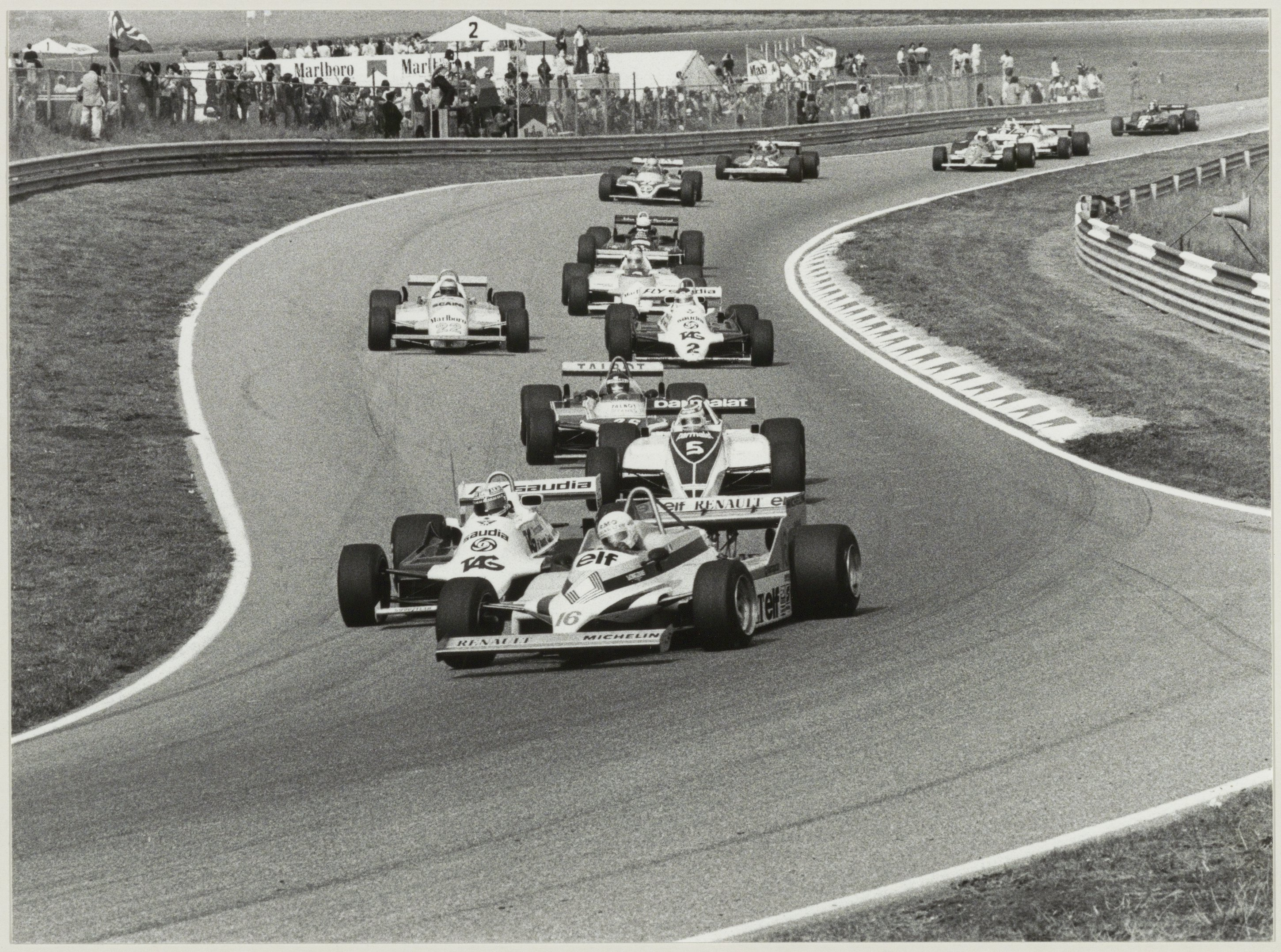
Arnoux runs second ahead of Jones, Piquet, Laffite and Reutemann in the early stages of the race.

At the start, Prost led the field into Tarzan, with teammate Arnoux following closely behind. Further back in the midfield, Gilles Villeneuve crashed his Ferrari into the back of Bruno Giacomelli's Alfa Romeo, vaulting over the Alfa before spinning out of the race.

As the field wound toward the second corner, Andretti and Reutemann collided, leaving Andretti's car with a broken nose. Before the end of the first lap, another incident occurred when Patrick Tambay in the second Ligier and Didier Pironi in the second Ferrari came together. Tambay retired instantly, whilst Pironi carried on for three more laps before also pulling out of the race.

At the front of the field, Arnoux was unable to keep up with the pace and dropped four places, behind Jones, Piquet, Laffite and Reutemann. With Arnoux out of the way, Jones hunted down Prost and challenged for the lead until his tyres wore out and Jones had to slow down. Reutemann and Laffite, in the meantime, battled fiercely for fourth, ending with both cars crashing out of the race on the 18th lap.

Toward the end of the race, a slowing Jones was overtaken by Piquet. This would prove to be crucial in the World Championship standings, for if Jones had kept second, Piquet would have missed out on the title at the final race of the season.

=== Race classification ===
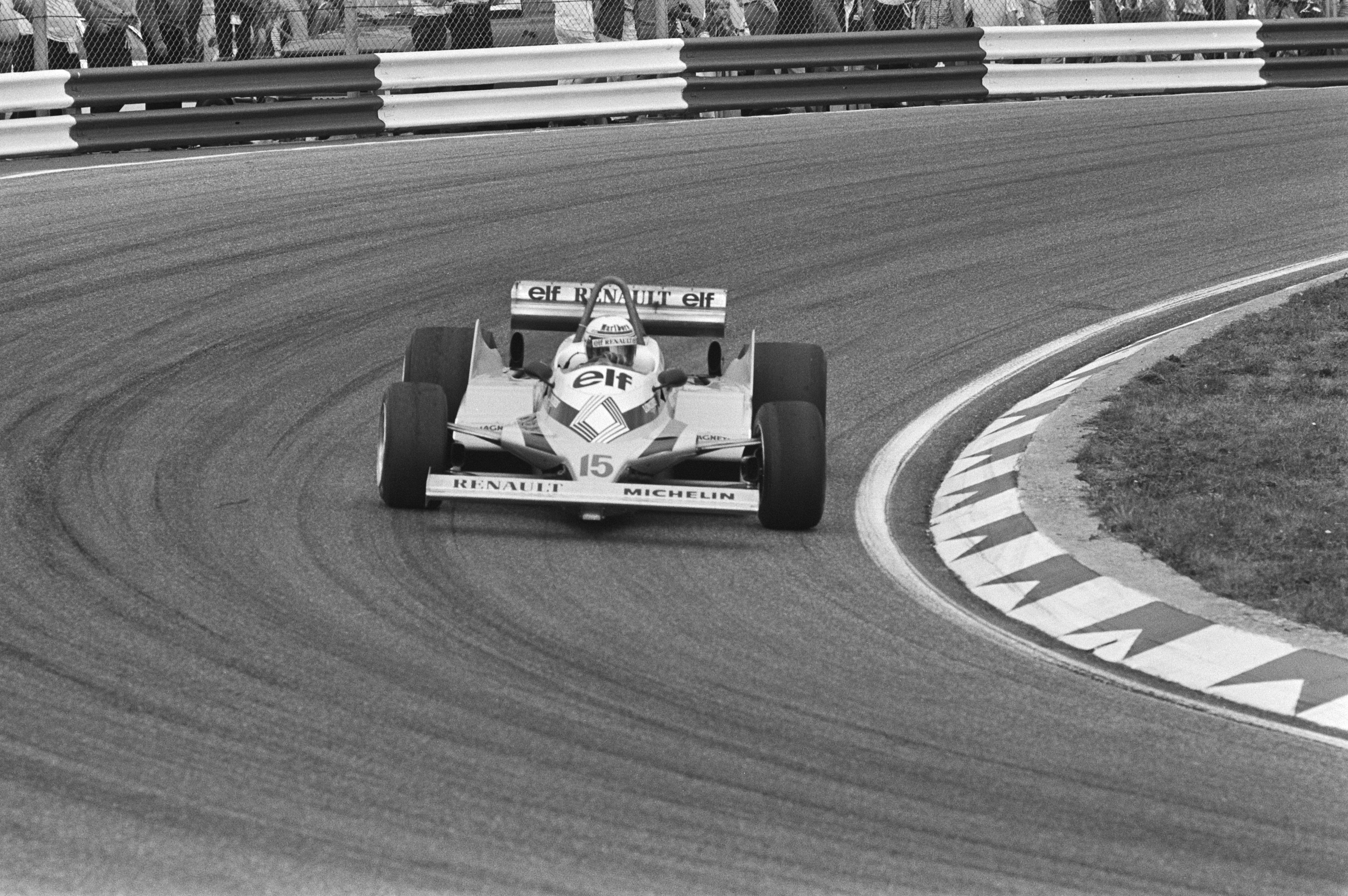
Alain Prost took his second Formula One win after leading all but one of the 72 laps.

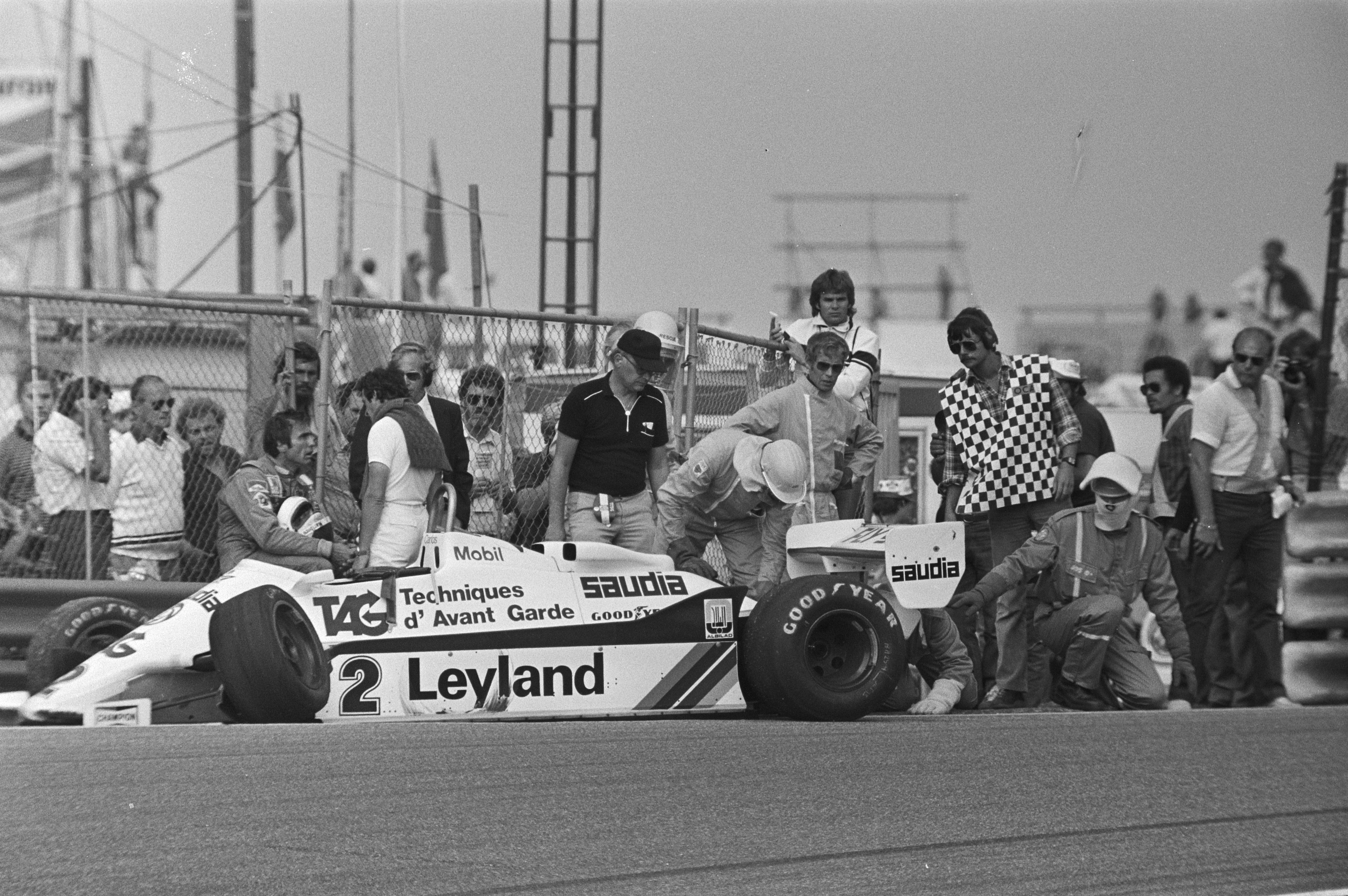
Reutemann retires after colliding with Laffite at the Tarzan corner.

Pos	No	Driver	Constructor	Tyre	Laps	Time/Retired	Grid	Points
1	15	(France) Alain Prost	Renault	MI	72	1:40:22.43	1	9
2	5	(Brazil) Nelson Piquet	Brabham-Ford	G	72	+ 8.24	3	6
3	1	(Australia) Alan Jones	Williams-Ford	G	72	+ 35.50	4	4
4	6	(Mexico) Héctor Rebaque	Brabham-Ford	G	71	+ 1 lap	15	3
5	11	(Italy) Elio de Angelis	Lotus-Ford	G	71	+ 1 lap	9	2
6	14	(Chile) Eliseo Salazar	Ensign-Ford	A	70	+ 2 laps	24	1
7	30	(Italy) Siegfried Stohr	Arrows-Ford	P	69	+ 3 laps	21	
8	33	(Switzerland) Marc Surer	Theodore-Ford	A	69	+ 3 laps	20	
9	4	(Italy) Michele Alboreto	Tyrrell-Ford	A	68	Engine	25	
10	9	(Sweden) Slim Borgudd	ATS-Ford	A	68	+ 4 laps	23	
Ret	22	(United States) Mario Andretti	Alfa Romeo	MI	62	Accident	7	
Ret	7	(United Kingdom) John Watson	McLaren-Ford	MI	50	Ignition	8	
Ret	3	(United States) Eddie Cheever	Tyrrell-Ford	G	46	Suspension	22	
Ret	32	(France) Jean-Pierre Jarier	Osella-Ford	MI	29	Transmission	18	
Ret	16	(France) René Arnoux	Renault	MI	21	Engine	2	
Ret	23	(Italy) Bruno Giacomelli	Alfa Romeo	MI	19	Tyre	14	
Ret	26	(France) Jacques Laffite	Ligier-Matra	MI	18	Collision	6	
Ret	2	(Argentina) Carlos Reutemann	Williams-Ford	G	18	Collision	5	
Ret	29	(Italy) Riccardo Patrese	Arrows-Ford	P	16	Suspension	10	
Ret	17	(Republic of Ireland) Derek Daly	March-Ford	A	5	Suspension	19	
Ret	28	(France) Didier Pironi	Ferrari	MI	4	Collision	12	
Ret	12	(United Kingdom) Nigel Mansell	Lotus-Ford	G	1	Engine	17	
Ret	25	(France) Patrick Tambay	Ligier-Matra	MI	1	Collision	11	
Ret	27	(Canada) Gilles Villeneuve	Ferrari	MI	0	Collision	16	
DNS	8	(Italy) Andrea de Cesaris	McLaren-Ford	MI		Non starter		
DNQ	35	(United Kingdom) Brian Henton	Toleman-Hart	P				
DNQ	20	(Finland) Keke Rosberg	Fittipaldi-Ford	P				
DNQ	21	(Brazil) Chico Serra	Fittipaldi-Ford	P				
DNQ	31	(Italy) Beppe Gabbiani	Osella-Ford	MI				
DNQ	36	(United Kingdom) Derek Warwick	Toleman-Hart	P				

== Championship standings after the race ==
Drivers' Championship standings

Pos	Driver	Points
1	(Brazil) Nelson Piquet	45
2	(Argentina) Carlos Reutemann	45
3	(France) Jacques Laffite	34
4	(Australia) Alan Jones	31
5	(France) Alain Prost	28

Constructors' Championship standings

Pos	Constructor	Points
1	(United Kingdom) Williams-Ford	76
2	(United Kingdom) Brabham-Ford	56
3	(France) Renault	39
4	(France) Ligier-Matra	34
5	(Italy) Ferrari	28

- Note: Only the top five positions are included for both sets of standings.

Previous race: 1981 Austrian Grand Prix	FIA Formula One World Championship; 1981 season	Next race: 1981 Italian Grand Prix
Previous race: 1980 Dutch Grand Prix	Dutch Grand Prix	Next race: 1982 Dutch Grand Prix
