= 1984 European Grand Prix =

- Race 15 of 16 in the 1984 Formula One World Championship

Race details
- Date: 7 October 1984
- Official name: XXXVI Großer Preis von Europa
- Location: Nürburgring; Nürburg, West Germany
- Course: Permanent racing facility
- Course length: 4.542 km (2.822 miles)
- Distance: 67 laps, 304.314 km (189.091 miles)
- Weather: Sunny

Pole position
Driver	(Brazil) Nelson Piquet	Brabham-BMW
- Time: 1:18.871

Fastest lap
Drivers	(Brazil) Nelson Piquet (lap 62)	Brabham-BMW
	(Italy) Michele Alboreto (lap 62)	Ferrari
- Time: 1:23.146

Podium
First	(France) Alain Prost	McLaren-TAG
Second	(Italy) Michele Alboreto	Ferrari
Third	(Brazil) Nelson Piquet	Brabham-BMW

The 1984 European Grand Prix was a Formula One motor race held at Nürburgring on 7 October 1984. It was the fifteenth race of the 1984 Formula One World Championship. It was also the first Formula One race to be held at the Nürburgring since 1976, and the first to be run on the new 4.54 km (2.82 mi) GP-Strecke circuit, rather than the historic 22.83 km (14.19 mi) Nordschleife, which after new pit facilities and layout modifications had been shortened so that both circuits could be used at the same time.

The 67-lap race was won by Frenchman Alain Prost, driving a McLaren-TAG. Italian Michele Alboreto finished second in a Ferrari, with Brazilian Nelson Piquet third in a Brabham-BMW, having started from pole position.

Prost's Austrian teammate Niki Lauda, who nearly lost his life in the last F1 race at the Nürburgring in 1976, finished fourth. With the reallocation of the disqualified Tyrrell team's points two days after the race and Prost thus gaining an extra point, Lauda's lead in the Drivers' Championship was reduced to 3.5 points with one race remaining.

== Report ==
During the race morning warm-up session, Alain Prost spun his McLaren-TAG and hit a course car parked at the side of the circuit.

Prior to the Grand Prix, young Brazilian driver Ayrton Senna had won a special Race of Champions event where all the competitors were driving the Mercedes-Benz 190E's against a host of former and current star drivers including Alain Prost, Carlos Reutemann, Denny Hulme, Phil Hill, Niki Lauda, Stirling Moss, James Hunt and Alan Jones. However, when the Grand Prix itself started, Senna had no such luck, triggering a first corner accident which took out the cars of Keke Rosberg, Marc Surer, Gerhard Berger, and Piercarlo Ghinzani. Senna's Toleman (which had started 12th) had run into the back of Rosberg's Williams under braking at the end of the main straight which caused the accident. Rosberg had started fourth (after blowing his Honda engine coming out of the final corner of his qualifying lap), but was slow off the line as his engine had suddenly developed a misfire.

After qualifying second on the grid, Alain Prost won the race in his McLaren from the Ferrari of Michele Alboreto and the Brabham-BMW of defending World Champion Nelson Piquet, with both the Ferrari and Brabham running out of fuel as they crossed the finish line. When they got out of their cars which stopped at the pit exit, Alboreto and Piquet raised their arms to each other in a gesture of frustration at FISA's 220 litre fuel limit for turbos which had reduced races to economy runs.

Niki Lauda, who had almost lost his life in a fiery crash during the 1976 German GP, started 15th and finished 4th in his McLaren. In stark contrast to the lack of safety of the Nordschleife, Lauda gave the new GP-Strecke the thumbs up as a very safe Grand Prix circuit, saying that it was "the perfect place to hold a Grand Prix".

== Classification ==
=== Qualifying ===
Pos	No	Driver	Constructor	Q1	Q2	Gap
1	1	(Brazil) Nelson Piquet	Brabham-BMW	1:18.871	1:43.988	
2	7	(France) Alain Prost	McLaren-TAG	1:19.175	1:40.693	+0.304
3	15	(France) Patrick Tambay	Renault	1:19.499	no time	+0.628
4	6	(Finland) Keke Rosberg	Williams-Honda	1:20.652	1:43.619	+1.781
5	27	(Italy) Michele Alboreto	Ferrari	1:20.910	1:41.878	+2.039
6	28	(France) René Arnoux	Ferrari	1:21.180	1:42.457	+2.309
7	16	(United Kingdom) Derek Warwick	Renault	1:21.571	1:44.289	+2.700
8	12	(United Kingdom) Nigel Mansell	Lotus-Renault	1:21.710	1:40.705	+2.839
9	22	(Italy) Riccardo Patrese	Alfa Romeo	1:21.937	1:41.724	+3.066
10	2	(Italy) Teo Fabi	Brabham-BMW	1:22.206	1:45.075	+3.335
11	18	(Belgium) Thierry Boutsen	Arrows-BMW	1:22.248	1:44.642	+3.377
12	19	(Brazil) Ayrton Senna	Toleman-Hart	1:22.439	1:43.747	+3.568
13	23	(United States) Eddie Cheever	Alfa Romeo	1:22.525	1:41.285	+3.654
14	5	(France) Jacques Laffite	Williams-Honda	1:22.613	no time	+3.742
15	8	(Austria) Niki Lauda	McLaren-TAG	1:22.643	1:40.392	+3.772
16	17	(Switzerland) Marc Surer	Arrows-BMW	1:22.708	1:45.319	+3.837
17	26	(Italy) Andrea de Cesaris	Ligier-Renault	1:23.034	1:42.362	+4.163
18	31	(Austria) Gerhard Berger	ATS-BMW	1:23.116	1:44.899	+4.245
19	25	(France) François Hesnault	Ligier-Renault	1:23.322	1:44.420	+4.451
20	24	(Italy) Piercarlo Ghinzani	Osella-Alfa Romeo	1:24.699	1:42.746	+5.828
21	10	(United Kingdom) Jonathan Palmer	RAM-Hart	1:25.050	1:51.449	+6.179
22	30	(Austria) Jo Gartner	Osella-Alfa Romeo	1:26.156	1:48.214	+7.285
23	11	(Italy) Elio de Angelis	Lotus-Renault	1:26.161	1:39.762	+7.290
24	21	(Italy) Mauro Baldi	Spirit-Hart	1:28.137	1:45.814	+9.266
25	9	(France) Philippe Alliot	RAM-Hart	1:30.259	1:53.587	+11.388
26	20	(Sweden) Stefan Johansson	Toleman-Hart	1:41.178	1:43.881	+22.307

=== Race ===
Pos	No	Driver	Constructor	Laps	Time/Retired	Grid	Points
1	7	(France) Alain Prost	McLaren-TAG	67	1:35:13.284	2	9
2	27	(Italy) Michele Alboreto	Ferrari	67	+ 23.911	5	6
3	1	(Brazil) Nelson Piquet	Brabham-BMW	67	+ 24.922	1	4
4	8	(Austria) Niki Lauda	McLaren-TAG	67	+ 43.086	15	3
5	28	(France) René Arnoux	Ferrari	67	+ 1:01.430	6	2
6	22	(Italy) Riccardo Patrese	Alfa Romeo	66	+ 1 Lap	9	1
7	26	(Italy) Andrea de Cesaris	Ligier-Renault	65	+ 2 Laps	17	
8	21	(Italy) Mauro Baldi	Spirit-Hart	65	+ 2 Laps	24	
9	18	(Belgium) Thierry Boutsen	Arrows-BMW	64	Ignition	11	
10	25	(France) François Hesnault	Ligier-Renault	64	+ 3 Laps	19	
11	16	(United Kingdom) Derek Warwick	Renault	61	Overheating	7	
Ret	30	(Austria) Jo Gartner	Osella-Alfa Romeo	60	Fuel System	22	
Ret	2	(Italy) Teo Fabi	Brabham-BMW	57	Gearbox	10	
Ret	12	(United Kingdom) Nigel Mansell	Lotus-Renault	51	Engine	8	
Ret	15	(France) Patrick Tambay	Renault	47	Fuel System	3	
Ret	23	(United States) Eddie Cheever	Alfa Romeo	37	Fuel System	13	
Ret	9	(France) Philippe Alliot	RAM-Hart	37	Turbo	25	
Ret	10	(United Kingdom) Jonathan Palmer	RAM-Hart	35	Turbo	21	
Ret	5	(France) Jacques Laffite	Williams-Honda	27	Engine	14	
Ret	11	(Italy) Elio de Angelis	Lotus-Renault	25	Turbo	23	
Ret	20	(Sweden) Stefan Johansson	Toleman-Hart	17	Overheating	26	
Ret	6	(Finland) Keke Rosberg	Williams-Honda	0	Collision	4	
Ret	19	(Brazil) Ayrton Senna	Toleman-Hart	0	Collision	12	
Ret	17	(Switzerland) Marc Surer	Arrows-BMW	0	Collision	16	
Ret	31	(Austria) Gerhard Berger	ATS-BMW	0	Collision	18	
Ret	24	(Italy) Piercarlo Ghinzani	Osella-Alfa Romeo	0	Collision	20	

== Championship standings after the race ==
Drivers' Championship standings

Pos	Driver	Points
1	(Austria) Niki Lauda	66
2	(France) Alain Prost	62.5
3	(Italy) Elio de Angelis	32
4	(Brazil) Nelson Piquet	28
5	(Italy) Michele Alboreto	27.5

Constructors' Championship standings

Pos	Constructor	Points
1	(United Kingdom) McLaren-TAG	128.5
2	(Italy) Ferrari	54.5
3	(United Kingdom) Lotus-Renault	45
4	(United Kingdom) Brabham-BMW	37
5	(France) Renault	34

- Note: Only the top five positions are included for both sets of standings. Points adjusted in accordance with FISA's decision on 9 October 1984 to reallocate Tyrrell's points. Prost's extra point comes from his promotion from fifth to fourth in the Detroit Grand Prix.

Previous race: 1984 Italian Grand Prix	FIA Formula One World Championship; 1984 season	Next race: 1984 Portuguese Grand Prix
Previous race: 1983 European Grand Prix; Previous race at the Nürburgring: 1976 German Grand Prix	European Grand Prix	Next race: 1985 European Grand Prix; Next race at the Nürburgring: 1985 German Grand Prix
