= Günter Schmid =

Formula One team owner (1932-2005)

Günter Schmid (13 August 1932 – 29 May 2005) was the founder and principal of the Formula One teams ATS and Rial Racing.
