= Toleman TG181 =

Formula One racing car

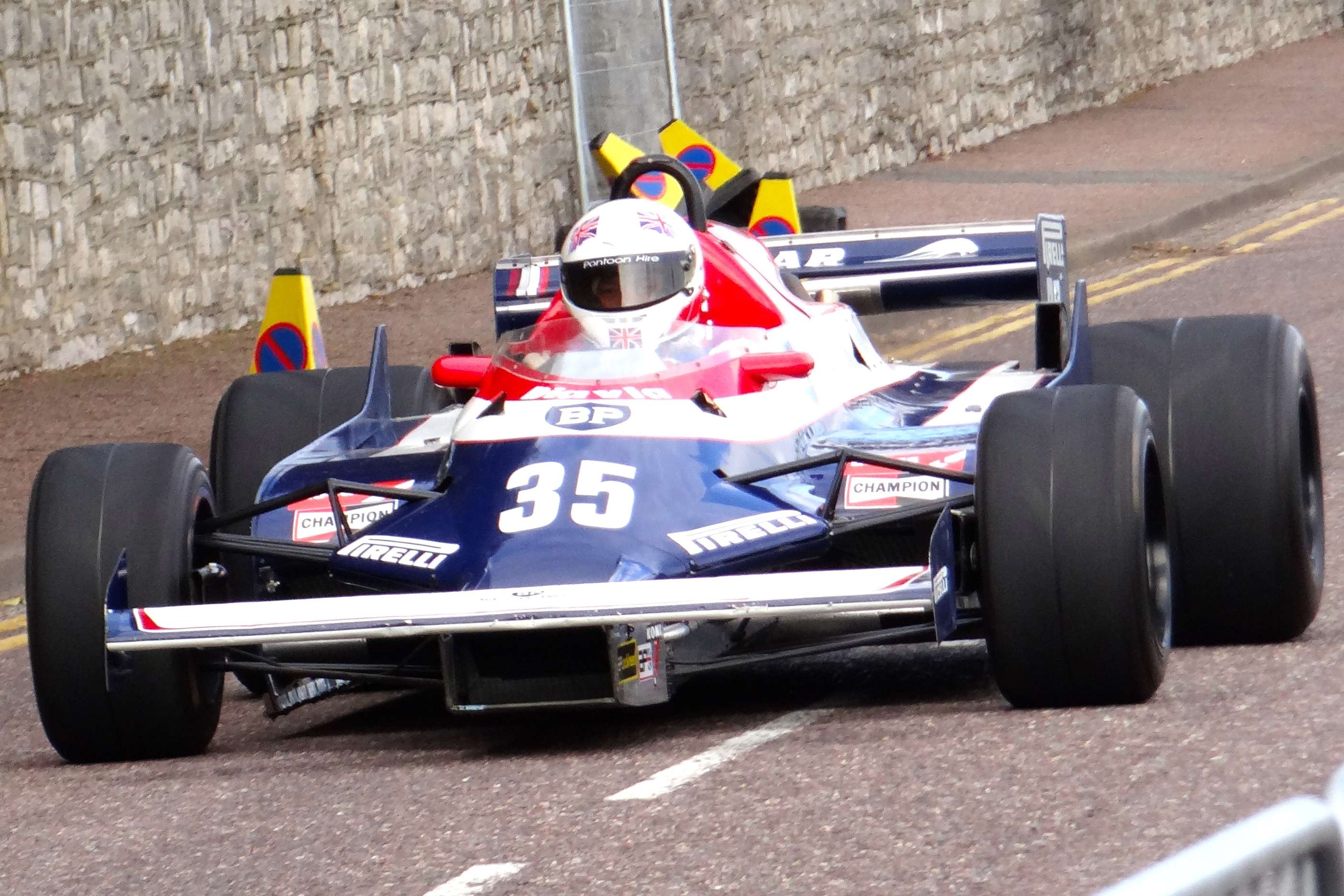
- Category: Formula One
- Constructor: Toleman
- Designers: Rory Byrne (Chief Designer); John Gentry (Assistant Designer)
- Successor: Toleman TG183

Technical specifications
- Chassis: Carbon fibre monocoque
- Suspension (front): Double wishbones, pull-rod actuated coil springs over dampers
- Suspension (rear): Double wishbones, push-rod actuated coil springs over dampers
- Axle track: Front: 1,816 mm (71 in); Rear: 1,683 mm (66 in)
- Wheelbase: 2,692 mm (106 in)
- Engine: Hart 415T, 1,459 cc (89.0 cu in), Straight 4, turbo, mid-engine, longitudinally mounted
- Transmission: Hewland / Toleman 5-speed manual
- Weight: 545 kg (1,202 lb)
- Fuel: Agip
- Tyres: Pirelli

Competition history
- Notable entrants: Toleman Group Motorsport
- Notable drivers: (United Kingdom) Derek Warwick (United Kingdom) Brian Henton (Italy) Teo Fabi
- Debut: 1981 San Marino Grand Prix
- Last event: 1982 Caesars Palace Grand Prix
Races	Wins	Poles	F/Laps
26	0	0	1
- Constructors' Championships: 0
- Drivers' Championships: 0

The Toleman TG181 is a Formula One car that was first used in the 1981 Formula One season. It was also the first car used by Toleman in F1.

Being heavy and with a relatively underpowered and unreliable engine, a 4-cylinder 1.5 litre turbo by Brian Hart, it was a generally poor performing car, with its drivers, Derek Warwick and Brian Henton, only getting through qualifying once each, with Henton's tenth place at Monza the only finish for the car. Due to its bulk, the team ended up nicknaming it the "General Belgrano" after the Argentine battleship sunk during the 1982 Falklands War, and the "Flying Pig".

Evolutions of the car, the Toleman TG181B and Toleman TG181C, were used the following year, to slightly better effect.

== Complete Formula One results ==
(key) (results in italics indicate fastest lap)

All chassis powered by versions of the Hart 415T 1.5-litre turbocharged 4-cylinder engine.

Year	Entrant	Chassis	Engine	Tyres	Drivers	1	2	3	4	5	6	7	8	9	10	11	12	13	14	15	16	Points	WCC
1981	Candy Toleman Motorsport	TG181	Hart 415T; S4 t/c	P		USW	BRA	ARG	SMR	BEL	MON	ESP	FRA	GBR	GER	AUT	NED	ITA	CAN	CPL		0	NC
1981	Candy Toleman Motorsport	TG181	Hart 415T; S4 t/c	P	(United Kingdom) Brian Henton				DNQ	DNQ	DNPQ	DNQ	DNQ	DNQ	DNQ	DNQ	DNQ	10	DNQ	DNQ		0	NC
1981	Candy Toleman Motorsport	TG181	Hart 415T; S4 t/c	P	(United Kingdom) Derek Warwick				DNQ	DNQ	DNPQ	DNQ	DNQ	DNQ	DNQ	DNQ	DNQ	DNQ	DNQ	Ret		0	NC
1982	Candy Toleman Motorsport	TG181B; TG181C	Hart 415T; S4 t/c	P		RSA	BRA	USW	SMR	BEL	MON	DET	CAN	NED	GBR	FRA	GER	AUT	SUI	ITA	CPL	0	NC
1982	Candy Toleman Motorsport	TG181B; TG181C	Hart 415T; S4 t/c	P	(United Kingdom) Derek Warwick	Ret	DNQ	DNPQ	Ret	Ret	DNQ			Ret	Ret	15	10	Ret	Ret			0	NC
1982	Candy Toleman Motorsport	TG181B; TG181C	Hart 415T; S4 t/c	P	(Italy) Teo Fabi	DNQ	DNQ	DNQ	NC	Ret	DNPQ			DNQ	Ret	Ret	DNQ	Ret	Ret	Ret	DNQ	0	NC
