= Hart Racing Engines =

UK motor racing engine manufacturer

Hart as a Formula One engine manufacturer
- Base: Harlow, Essex, United Kingdom
- Founder(s): Brian Hart

Formula One World Championship career
- First entry: 1981 San Marino Grand Prix
- Last entry: 1997 European Grand Prix
- Races entered: 158 (144 starts)
- Chassis: Toleman, RAM, Spirit, Lola, Jordan, Footwork, Minardi
- Constructors' Championships: 0
- Drivers' Championships: 0
- Race victories: 0
- Podiums: 5
- Points: 63
- Pole positions: 2
- Fastest laps: 2

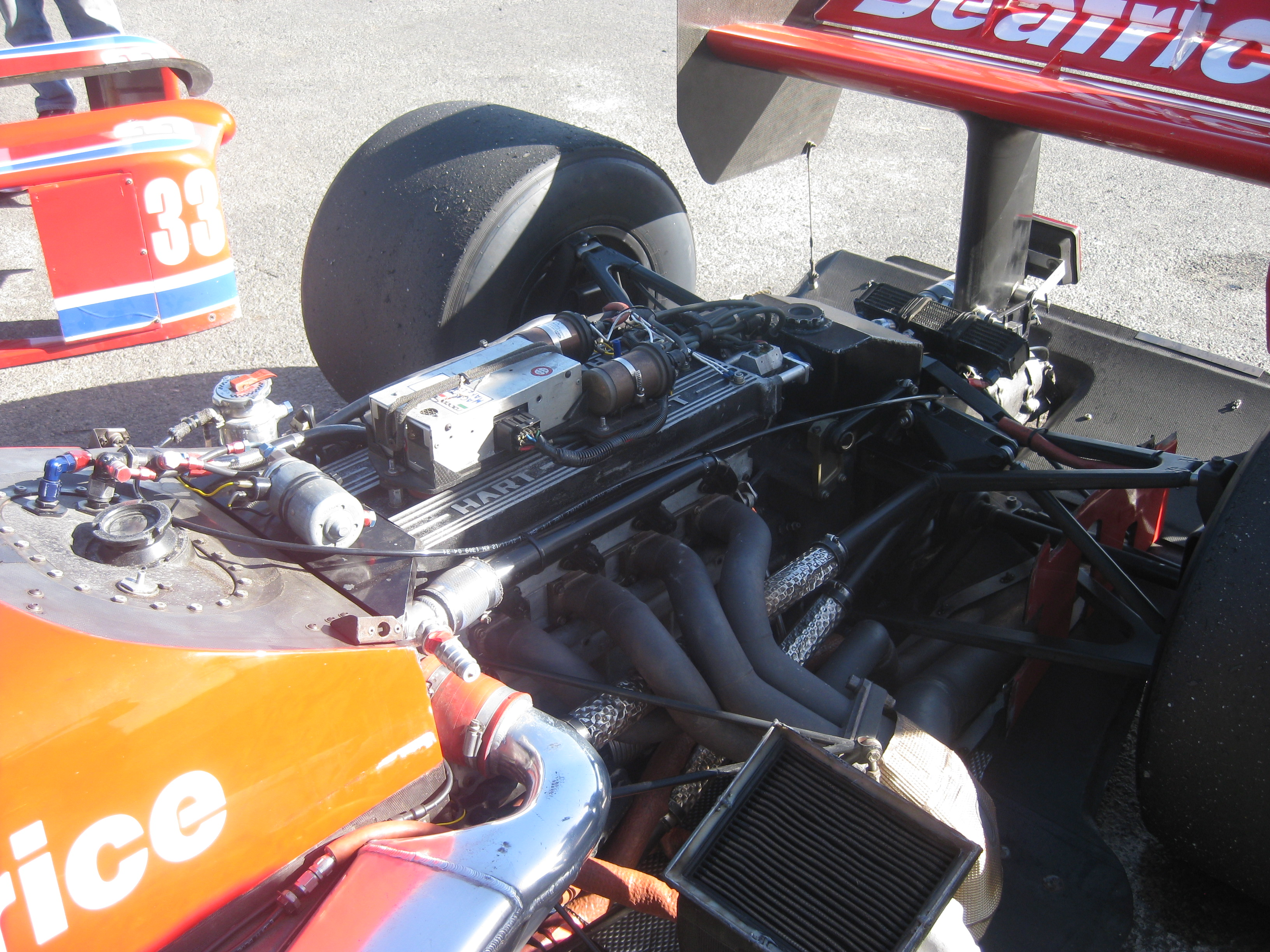
Hart 415T engine in a Lola THL1 chassis

Brian Hart Ltd., also known as Hart and Hart Racing Engines, was a motor racing engine manufacturer that participated in 157 Formula One Grands Prix, powering a total of 368 entries.

Founded in 1969 by British engineer Brian Hart, Hart initially concentrated on servicing and tuning engines from other manufacturers for various independent British teams at all levels of motorsport. Hart found particular success with developments of Ford's FVA engine, eventually leading the large multinational company to approach the small independent to develop the Ford BDA 1.6 L engine for the 2.0L class. The European Formula Two title was won in both 1971 and 1972 with Hart-built Ford engines, and the 2.0 L BDA engine powered the majority of Ford's 1970s rallying successes.

With Ford's withdrawal from F2 in the mid-1970s, Hart began to concentrate on building their own designs. The first engine to bear the Hart name alone was the twin-cam, four-cylinder Hart 420R F2 unit, which appeared in 1976 and powered race-winning cars until the end of the decade. In 1978, the Toleman team agreed to a partnership program, with Toleman providing finance to develop further Hart engine designs. The fruits of this collaboration resulted in Toleman taking a one-two finish in the 1980 European F2 Championship.

1985 Beatrice Lola-Hart THL 1
Beatrice Lola-Hart THL 1 at Goodwood Festival of Speed 2009

For 1981, Hart followed Toleman into Formula One, with an inline four-cylinder 1.5 L turbo engine named the 415T. However, the year was a disaster, with Brian Hart's small operation failing to keep pace with better-funded outfits. Toleman cars only qualified to race twice. Hart persisted though, with the best result from the five-year relationship with Toleman coming when Ayrton Senna took second place at the 1984 Monaco Grand Prix and Toleman claiming 7th in the 1984 Constructors Championship. Teo Fabi also took pole position in a Toleman-Hart at the 1985 German Grand Prix, the first of only two F1 poles by a Hart-powered car.

During this period, Hart turbos were used by three other teams – RAM (1984–85); Spirit (1984–85); and the Haas Lola team (1985–86). While none of their teams performed that well, Hart gained a reputation for excellent work on a small budget.

After 1984, major manufacturers like Renault, Honda, BMW, Porsche (funded by TAG), and Ferrari were able to develop their engines to receive much higher turbo boost than the Hart 415T. This resulted in Brian Hart stopping development of the engine. The last time it was used was by the Haas Lola team at the 1986 San Marino Grand Prix, with Patrick Tambay qualifying 11th but retiring with engine troubles after just five laps.

At its peak in 1986 when turbo boost was unrestricted, the Hart 415T produced a reported 750 bhp (559 kW; 760 PS) at 11,000 rpm. Unfortunately this compared unfavourably to the 1,400 bhp (1,044 kW; 1,419 PS) of the BMW engine, the 1,200 bhp (895 kW; 1,217 PS) of the Renault, Honda and Ferrari, the 1,000 bhp (746 kW; 1,014 PS) of the TAG-Porsche and even the 900 bhp (671 kW; 912 PS) of the new for 1986, Cosworth designed and built Ford V6 turbo.

Following this and the outlawing of turbocharged engines in Formula One after the 1988 season, Hart did freelance work. The company mainly tuned Cosworth DFR V8s for a number of F1 teams, including Footwork Arrows in 1990 and 1991, Tyrrell in 1990, Larrousse in 1991 and AGS in 1991.

Hart returned with an in-house 3.5 L V10 in 1993 named the 1035, signing a two-year deal with the Jordan team. This culminated in a successful 1994 season, with Rubens Barrichello finishing third at the Pacific Grand Prix and taking the engine company's last F1 pole position at the Belgian Grand Prix.

With the introduction of the 3.0 L formula in 1995, Hart switched to a V8 engine named the 830, and these were used by the Arrows team in 1995 and 1996; Gianni Morbidelli took third at the 1995 Australian Grand Prix. For 1997, these engines were taken over by the Minardi team, while Brian Hart himself designed a new V10 engine, the 1030, although the funds to build it were not available.

Later that year, Tom Walkinshaw Racing (TWR) bought out Brian Hart Ltd., and merged it into their Arrows Formula One team. The 1030 V10 was built and raced in 1998–1999 as the Arrows T2-F1 V10, with Mika Salo taking a fourth place at the 1998 Monaco Grand Prix. Frustrated with the lack of development, Brian Hart left Arrows.

== Complete Formula One World Championship results ==
(key) (Races in bold indicate pole position) (Races in italics indicate fastest lap)

Year	Entrant	Chassis	Engine	Tyres	Drivers	1	2	3	4	5	6	7	8	9	10	11	12	13	14	15	16	17	WCC	Points
1981	Candy Toleman Motorsport	Toleman TG181	Hart 415T 1.5 S4 (t/c)	**P**		USW	BRA	ARG	SMR	BEL	MON	ESP	FRA	GBR	GER	AUT	NED	ITA	CAN	LVS			NC	0
1981	Candy Toleman Motorsport	Toleman TG181	Hart 415T 1.5 S4 (t/c)	**P**	Brian Henton				DNQ	DNQ	DNPQ	DNQ	DNQ	DNQ	DNQ	DNQ	DNQ	10	DNQ	DNQ			NC	0
1981	Candy Toleman Motorsport	Toleman TG181	Hart 415T 1.5 S4 (t/c)	**P**	Derek Warwick				DNQ	DNQ	DNPQ	DNQ	DNQ	DNQ	DNQ	DNQ	DNQ	DNQ	DNQ	Ret			NC	0
1982	Candy Toleman Motorsport Toleman Group Motorsport	Toleman TG181B; Toleman TG181C; Toleman TG183	Hart 415T 1.5 S4 (t/c)	**P**		RSA	BRA	USW	SMR	BEL	MON	DET	CAN	NED	GBR	FRA	GER	AUT	SUI	ITA	LVS		NC	0
1982	Candy Toleman Motorsport Toleman Group Motorsport	Toleman TG181B; Toleman TG181C; Toleman TG183	Hart 415T 1.5 S4 (t/c)	**P**	Derek Warwick	Ret	DNQ	DNPQ	Ret	Ret	DNQ	WD		Ret	Ret	15	10	Ret	Ret	Ret	Ret		NC	0
1982	Candy Toleman Motorsport Toleman Group Motorsport	Toleman TG181B; Toleman TG181C; Toleman TG183	Hart 415T 1.5 S4 (t/c)	**P**	Teo Fabi	DNQ	DNQ	DNQ	NC	Ret	DNPQ	WD		DNQ	Ret	Ret	DNQ	Ret	Ret	Ret	DNQ		NC	0
1983	Candy Toleman Motorsport	Toleman TG183B	Hart 415T 1.5 S4 (t/c)	**P**		BRA	USW	FRA	SMR	MON	BEL	DET	CAN	GBR	GER	AUT	NED	ITA	EUR	RSA			9th	10
1983	Candy Toleman Motorsport	Toleman TG183B	Hart 415T 1.5 S4 (t/c)	**P**	Derek Warwick	8	Ret	Ret	Ret	Ret	7	Ret	Ret	Ret	Ret	Ret	4	6	5	4			9th	10
1983	Candy Toleman Motorsport	Toleman TG183B	Hart 415T 1.5 S4 (t/c)	**P**	Bruno Giacomelli	Ret	Ret	13	Ret	DNQ	8	9	Ret	Ret	Ret	Ret	13	7	6	Ret			9th	10
1984	Skoal Bandit Formula 1 Team	RAM 01; RAM 02	Hart 415T 1.5 S4 (t/c)	**P**		BRA	RSA	BEL	SMR	FRA	MON	CAN	DET	DAL	GBR	GER	AUT	NED	ITA	EUR	POR		NC	0
1984	Skoal Bandit Formula 1 Team	RAM 01; RAM 02	Hart 415T 1.5 S4 (t/c)	**P**	Philippe Alliot	Ret	Ret	DNQ	Ret	Ret	DNQ	10	Ret	DNS	Ret	Ret	11	10	Ret	Ret	Ret		NC	0
1984	Skoal Bandit Formula 1 Team	RAM 01; RAM 02	Hart 415T 1.5 S4 (t/c)	**P**	Jonathan Palmer	8	Ret	10	9	13	DNQ		Ret	Ret	Ret	Ret	9	9	Ret	Ret	Ret		NC	0
1984	Skoal Bandit Formula 1 Team	RAM 01; RAM 02	Hart 415T 1.5 S4 (t/c)	**P**	Mike Thackwell							Ret											NC	0
1984	Toleman Group Motorsport	Toleman TG183B; Toleman TG184	Hart 415T 1.5 S4 (t/c)	**P** **M**	Ayrton Senna	Ret	6	6	DNQ	Ret	2	7	Ret	Ret	3	Ret	Ret	Ret		Ret	3		7th	16
1984	Toleman Group Motorsport	Toleman TG183B; Toleman TG184	Hart 415T 1.5 S4 (t/c)	**P** **M**	Johnny Cecotto	Ret	Ret	Ret	NC	Ret	Ret	9	Ret	Ret	DNQ								7th	16
1984	Toleman Group Motorsport	Toleman TG183B; Toleman TG184	Hart 415T 1.5 S4 (t/c)	**P** **M**	Stefan Johansson														4	Ret	11		7th	16
1984	Toleman Group Motorsport	Toleman TG183B; Toleman TG184	Hart 415T 1.5 S4 (t/c)	**P** **M**	Pierluigi Martini														DNQ				7th	16
1984	Spirit Racing	Spirit 101	Hart 415T 1.5 S4 (t/c)	**P**	Mauro Baldi	Ret	8	Ret	8	Ret	DNQ									8	15		NC	0
1984	Spirit Racing	Spirit 101	Hart 415T 1.5 S4 (t/c)	**P**	Huub Rothengatter							NC		Ret	NC	9	NC	Ret	8				NC	0
1985	Skoal Bandit Formula 1 Team	RAM 03	Hart 415T 1.5 S4 (t/c)	**P**		BRA	POR	SMR	MON	CAN	DET	FRA	GBR	GER	AUT	NED	ITA	BEL	EUR	RSA	AUS		NC	0
1985	Skoal Bandit Formula 1 Team	RAM 03	Hart 415T 1.5 S4 (t/c)	**P**	Manfred Winkelhock	13	Ret	Ret	DNQ	Ret	Ret	12	Ret	Ret									NC	0
1985	Skoal Bandit Formula 1 Team	RAM 03	Hart 415T 1.5 S4 (t/c)	**P**	Philippe Alliot	9	Ret	Ret	DNQ	Ret	Ret	Ret	Ret	Ret	Ret	Ret	Ret	Ret	Ret				NC	0
1985	Skoal Bandit Formula 1 Team	RAM 03	Hart 415T 1.5 S4 (t/c)	**P**	Kenny Acheson										Ret	DNQ	Ret						NC	0
1985	Toleman Group Motorsport	Toleman TG185	Hart 415T 1.5 S4 (t/c)	**P**	Stefan Johansson	WD	WD	WD															NC	0
1985	Toleman Group Motorsport	Toleman TG185	Hart 415T 1.5 S4 (t/c)	**P**	Teo Fabi				Ret	Ret	Ret	14	Ret	**Ret**	Ret	Ret	12	Ret	Ret	Ret	Ret		NC	0
1985	Toleman Group Motorsport	Toleman TG185	Hart 415T 1.5 S4 (t/c)	**P**	John Watson	WD	WD	WD															NC	0
1985	Toleman Group Motorsport	Toleman TG185	Hart 415T 1.5 S4 (t/c)	**P**	Piercarlo Ghinzani										DNS	Ret	DNS	Ret	Ret	Ret	Ret		NC	0
1985	Spirit Enterprises Ltd	Spirit 101D	Hart 415T 1.5 S4 (t/c)	**P**	Mauro Baldi	Ret	Ret	Ret	WD														NC	0
1985	Team Haas (USA) Ltd	Lola THL1	Hart 415T 1.5 S4 (t/c)	**G**	Alan Jones												Ret		Ret	DNS	Ret		NC	0
1986	Team Haas (USA) Ltd	Lola THL1	Hart 415T 1.5 S4 (t/c)	**G**		BRA	ESP	SMR	MON	BEL	CAN	DET	FRA	GBR	GER	HUN	AUT	ITA	POR	MEX	AUS		NC	0
1986	Team Haas (USA) Ltd	Lola THL1	Hart 415T 1.5 S4 (t/c)	**G**	Alan Jones	Ret	Ret																NC	0
1986	Team Haas (USA) Ltd	Lola THL1	Hart 415T 1.5 S4 (t/c)	**G**	Patrick Tambay	Ret	8	Ret															NC	0
1993	Sasol Jordan	Jordan 193	Hart 1035 3.5 V10	**G**		RSA	BRA	EUR	SMR	ESP	MON	CAN	FRA	GBR	GER	HUN	BEL	ITA	POR	JPN	AUS		11th	3
1993	Sasol Jordan	Jordan 193	Hart 1035 3.5 V10	**G**	Rubens Barrichello	Ret	Ret	10	Ret	12	9	Ret	7	10	Ret	Ret	Ret	Ret	13	5	11		11th	3
1993	Sasol Jordan	Jordan 193	Hart 1035 3.5 V10	**G**	Ivan Capelli	Ret	DNQ																11th	3
1993	Sasol Jordan	Jordan 193	Hart 1035 3.5 V10	**G**	Thierry Boutsen			Ret	Ret	11	Ret	12	11	Ret	13	9	Ret						11th	3
1993	Sasol Jordan	Jordan 193	Hart 1035 3.5 V10	**G**	Marco Apicella													Ret					11th	3
1993	Sasol Jordan	Jordan 193	Hart 1035 3.5 V10	**G**	Emanuele Naspetti														Ret				11th	3
1993	Sasol Jordan	Jordan 193	Hart 1035 3.5 V10	**G**	Eddie Irvine															6	Ret		11th	3
1994	Sasol Jordan	Jordan 194	Hart 1035 3.5 V10	**G**		BRA	PAC	SMR	MON	ESP	CAN	FRA	GBR	GER	HUN	BEL	ITA	POR	EUR	JPN	AUS		5th	28
1994	Sasol Jordan	Jordan 194	Hart 1035 3.5 V10	**G**	Rubens Barrichello	4	3	DNQ	Ret	Ret	7	Ret	4	Ret	Ret	**Ret**	4	4	12	Ret	4		5th	28
1994	Sasol Jordan	Jordan 194	Hart 1035 3.5 V10	**G**	Eddie Irvine	Ret	EX	EX	EX	6	Ret	Ret	Ret	Ret	Ret	13	Ret	7	4	5	Ret		5th	28
1994	Sasol Jordan	Jordan 194	Hart 1035 3.5 V10	**G**	Aguri Suzuki		Ret																5th	28
1994	Sasol Jordan	Jordan 194	Hart 1035 3.5 V10	**G**	Andrea de Cesaris			Ret	4														5th	28
1995	Footwork Hart	Footwork FA16	Hart 830 3.0 V8	**G**		BRA	ARG	SMR	ESP	MON	CAN	FRA	GBR	GER	HUN	BEL	ITA	POR	EUR	PAC	JPN	AUS	8th	5
1995	Footwork Hart	Footwork FA16	Hart 830 3.0 V8	**G**	Gianni Morbidelli	Ret	Ret	13	11	9	6	14								Ret	Ret	3	8th	5
1995	Footwork Hart	Footwork FA16	Hart 830 3.0 V8	**G**	Massimiliano Papis								Ret	Ret	Ret	Ret	7	Ret	12				8th	5
1995	Footwork Hart	Footwork FA16	Hart 830 3.0 V8	**G**	Taki Inoue	Ret	Ret	Ret	Ret	Ret	9	Ret	Ret	Ret	Ret	12	8	15	Ret	Ret	12	Ret	8th	5
1996	Footwork Hart	Footwork FA17	Hart 830 3.0 V8	**G**		AUS	BRA	ARG	EUR	SMR	MON	ESP	CAN	FRA	GBR	GER	HUN	BEL	ITA	POR	JPN		9th	1
1996	Footwork Hart	Footwork FA17	Hart 830 3.0 V8	**G**	Ricardo Rosset	9	Ret	Ret	11	Ret	Ret	Ret	Ret	11	Ret	11	8	9	Ret	14	13		9th	1
1996	Footwork Hart	Footwork FA17	Hart 830 3.0 V8	**G**	Jos Verstappen	Ret	Ret	6	Ret	Ret	Ret	Ret	Ret	Ret	10	Ret	Ret	Ret	8	Ret	11		9th	1
1997	Minardi Team	Minardi M197	Hart 830 3.0 V8	**B**		AUS	BRA	ARG	SMR	MON	ESP	CAN	FRA	GBR	GER	HUN	BEL	ITA	AUT	LUX	JPN	EUR	NC	0
1997	Minardi Team	Minardi M197	Hart 830 3.0 V8	**B**	Ukyo Katayama	Ret	18	Ret	11	10	Ret	Ret	11	Ret	Ret	10	14	Ret	11	Ret	Ret	17	NC	0
1997	Minardi Team	Minardi M197	Hart 830 3.0 V8	**B**	Jarno Trulli	9	12	9	DNS	Ret	15	Ret											NC	0
1997	Minardi Team	Minardi M197	Hart 830 3.0 V8	**B**	Tarso Marques								Ret	10	Ret	12	Ret	14	EX	Ret	Ret	15	NC	0
Engines badged as Arrows
1998	Arrows	Arrows A19	Arrows T2-F1 (Hart 1030) 3.0 V10	**B**		AUS	BRA	ARG	SMR	ESP	MON	CAN	FRA	GBR	AUT	GER	HUN	BEL	ITA	LUX	JPN		7th	6
1998	Arrows	Arrows A19	Arrows T2-F1 (Hart 1030) 3.0 V10	**B**	Pedro Diniz	Ret	Ret	Ret	Ret	Ret	6	9	14	Ret	Ret	Ret	11	5	Ret	Ret	Ret		7th	6
1998	Arrows	Arrows A19	Arrows T2-F1 (Hart 1030) 3.0 V10	**B**	Mika Salo	Ret	Ret	Ret	9	Ret	4	Ret	13	Ret	Ret	14	Ret	DNS	Ret	14	Ret		7th	6
1999	Arrows	Arrows A20	Arrows T2-F1 (Hart 1030) 3.0 V10	**B**		AUS	BRA	SMR	MON	ESP	CAN	FRA	GBR	AUT	GER	HUN	BEL	ITA	EUR	MAL	JPN		9th	1
1999	Arrows	Arrows A20	Arrows T2-F1 (Hart 1030) 3.0 V10	**B**	Pedro de la Rosa	6	Ret	Ret	Ret	11	Ret	12	Ret	Ret	Ret	15	Ret	Ret	Ret	Ret	13		9th	1
1999	Arrows	Arrows A20	Arrows T2-F1 (Hart 1030) 3.0 V10	**B**	Toranosuke Takagi	7	8	Ret	Ret	12	Ret	DSQ	16	Ret	Ret	Ret	Ret	Ret	Ret	Ret	Ret		9th	1
