= Toleman =

British motor racing team

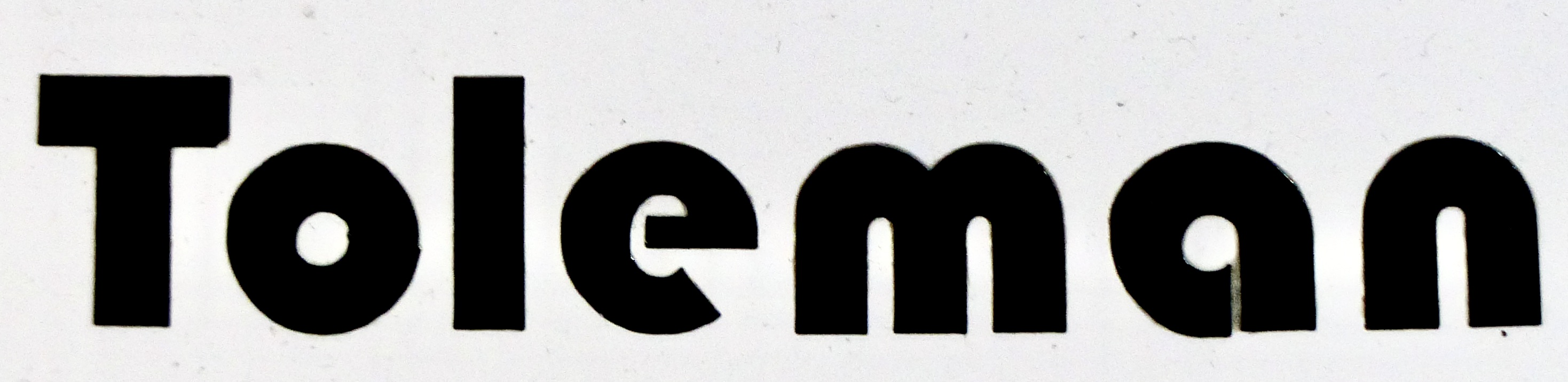
- Full name: Toleman Motorsport
- Base: Witney, Oxfordshire, England
- Team principal(s): Alex Hawkridge
- Founder(s): Ted Toleman; Alex Hawkridge
- Noted staff: Roger Silman; George McAllister; Rory Byrne; Pat Symonds; John Gentry; Christopher Witty
- Noted drivers: (United Kingdom) Brian Henton; (United Kingdom) Derek Warwick; (Italy) Teo Fabi; (Italy) Bruno Giacomelli; (Brazil) Ayrton Senna; (Venezuela) Johnny Cecotto; (Sweden) Stefan Johansson; (Italy) Piercarlo Ghinzani
- Next name: Benetton Formula

Formula One World Championship career
- First entry: 1981 San Marino Grand Prix
- Races entered: 70 (57 starts)
- Constructors' Championships: 0 (best finish: 7th, 1984)
- Drivers' Championships: 0 (best finish: 9th, 1983–84)
- Race victories: 0 (best finish: 2nd, 1984 Monaco Grand Prix)
- Pole positions: 1
- Fastest laps: 2
- Final entry: 1985 Australian Grand Prix

Toleman Motorsport was a Formula One constructor based in the United Kingdom. It participated in Formula One between 1981 and 1985, competing in 70 Grands Prix. Today, it is best known for giving Ayrton Senna his Formula One debut.

The team was generally uncompetitive during its short lifetime, prompting Senna to leave after just one year. However, several of its engineers, including Rory Byrne and Pat Symonds, stayed with the team after its sale to the Benetton Group and eventually built the organisation into the title-winning Benetton Formula. As such, Toleman is the progenitor of the racing lineage informally known as "Team Enstone".

== Origins ==
In 1926, Edward Toleman established a company to deliver Ford cars from the Ford factory to dealers across the country. Edward's son Albert took over the company in the 1950s, and Albert's sons Ted and Bob succeeded him in 1966. The Toleman brothers recruited Alex Hawkridge to expand their transportation business into Europe.

The Toleman family were enthusiastic gentleman drivers. Albert Toleman won several club-level rally championships. Ted Toleman participated in Formula Two, the Dakar Rally, and the 1976 24 Hours of Le Mans. Unfortunately, Bob Toleman died in a racing accident in 1976.

Hawkridge encouraged the company to enter auto racing by sponsoring competitors. In 1976, Toleman began sponsoring Rad Dougall in the British Formula Ford Championship, although Dougall broke his legs in a crash the same day Toleman agreed to fund him. Toleman continued sponsoring Dougall for 1977, and he won the Formula Ford 2000 title that year. Impressed with the results, Ted Toleman agreed to start his own Formula Two team.

== Formula Two ==
From 1978 to 1980, Toleman spent three seasons in the European Formula Two Championship under the leadership of Alex Hawkridge and Roger Silman. To prepare for the higher level of competition, the team hired Royale Racing designer Rory Byrne, with an eye towards eventually building his own cars. The team steadily improved from year to year.

In 1978, Toleman ran one car, a customer March-BMW. Rad Dougall made the podium in the very first race, but scored only one more point that season. Byrne accused March's Robin Herd of undermining Toleman to benefit March's works team. He concluded that "it’s no use having a customer car, you’re always one step behind."

In 1979, Toleman fielded a second car (piloted by Brian Henton), a customer Ralt-Hart. The team still used the previous year's March chassis when the Ralt was unavailable but otherwise preferred the Ralt. The Hart engines were less powerful than the BMWs but much lighter, with outstanding reliability. Henton finished 2nd in the championship standings, losing the title to Marc Surer by two points. He would have won the title but for the events of the 1979 Mediterranean Grand Prix, where he finished first on track but was subsequently disqualified.

In 1980, the F2 regulations were revised to limit ground effect. Derek Warwick arrived to replace Dougall, bringing with him financial support from sponsor BP. Byrne unveiled his first team-built chassis, the Toleman TG280, which exploited a loophole that allowed the team to continue running a ground effect car. In addition, the team switched from Goodyear to Pirelli tyres, as Byrne felt that Goodyear's tyres were optimised for qualifying and not a full race distance. Toleman-Hart dominated the F2 season. Henton and Warwick finished 1-2 atop the standings, with a lead so large they skipped the final race of the season. The car was so strong that when Toleman customer drivers were included, the team accounted for three of the top four and four of the top seven drivers in the standings. Toleman cars also won six of the twelve races.

== Formula Atlantic/Pacific ==
Toleman also produced the TA860 car (built by Lola) for Formula Atlantic and Formula Pacific racing. Only two were produced with one going to Carl Haas in America in June 1981, and the other being sold to Australian race driver Peter Williamson in September 1981. "Willo" as he was known, raced the car in Australian Formula 1 (Pacific) which in the early 1980s included the Australian Drivers' Championship and the Australian Grand Prix in its years before it became a Formula One race in 1985. Unlike most in Australia's top open wheel racing at the time who used the 1.6L Ford BDA engine, Toyota loyalist Williamson (he ran a Toyota car dealership in Sydney) used a 1.6L Toyota engine. The second chassis used by Williamson was crashed during practice for the 1984 Australian Grand Prix, prompting Willo to retire from motor racing.

== Formula One ==
Toleman entered Formula One for the 1981 season. Although Hawkridge admitted that the team was not ready to compete that year, he explained that the team had a short window of opportunity to enter the top level, because the FISA side of the FISA–FOCA war wanted to add teams to improve its political position against the established FOCA teams like Brabham, McLaren, and Williams. Toleman would later refuse to join FOCA's boycott of the 1982 San Marino Grand Prix.

The team continued to recruited talented engineers, signing Byrne's former Royale lieutenant Pat Symonds for 1981 by promising to double his salary. The team innovated by sourcing the first fibre-optic engine management system, which (according to Hawkridge) improved reliability.

Most importantly, Toleman sought to distinguish itself from other small teams by commissioning its successful F2 engine supplier, Hart, to produce turbocharger engines for the team. By that time, Formula One was beginning to be dominated by turbo-powered cars, which outpaced the naturally aspirated engines previously dominant in the sport. Looking back, Symonds remarked that "if Alex and Ted Toleman had said, 'Let's go F1 racing, let's buy a [naturally aspirated Cosworth] DFV,' we'd have been a hell of a lot more successful in 1981 – but we wouldn’t have been around by 1990. We'd have been just another team."

=== 1981–1982: Difficult early years ===
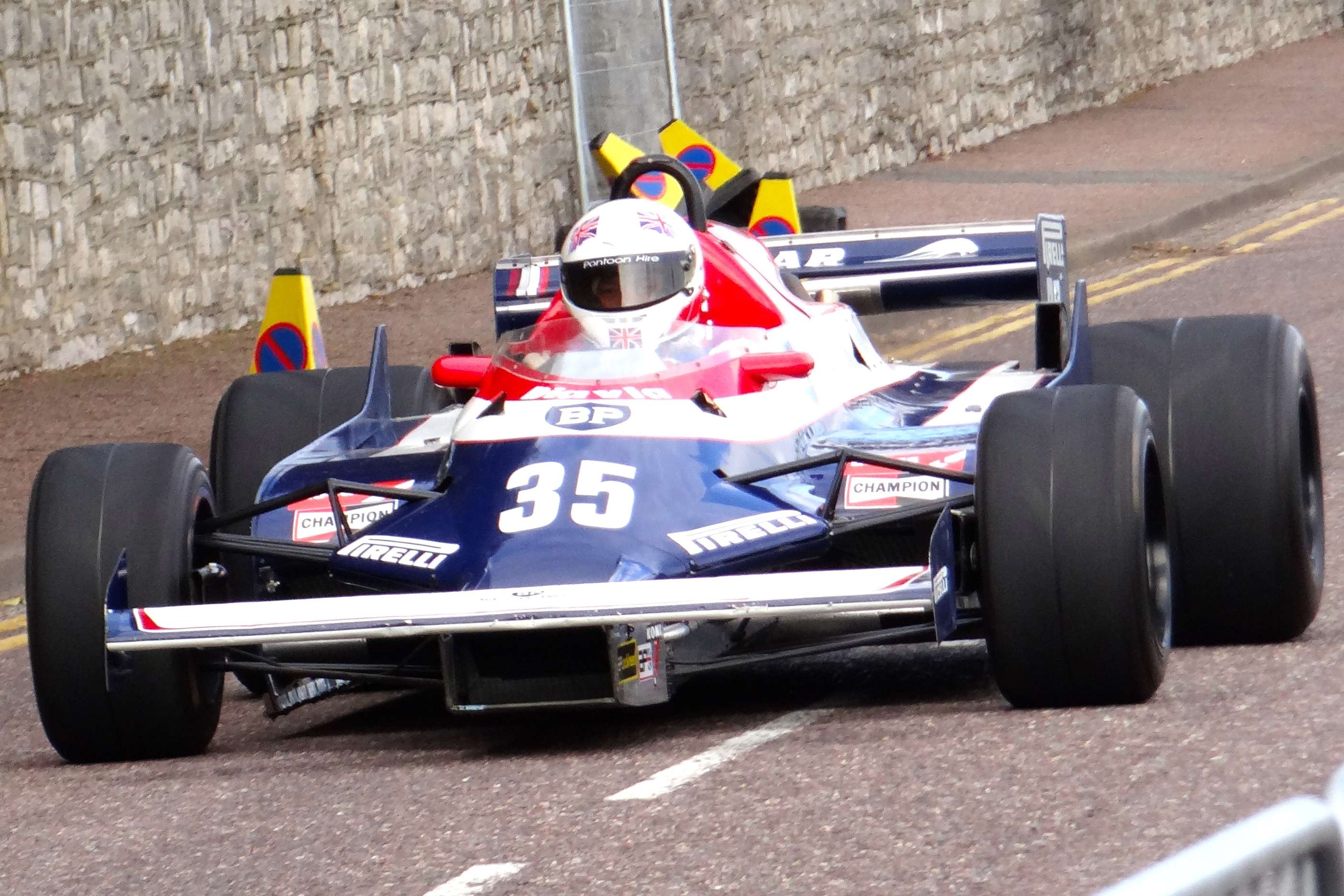
Toleman TG181

Toleman suffered greatly in the short run, due to growing pains associated with the innovative turbo technology and other issues. During this period, Toleman's cars were mocked in the racing press as "The Pig" (for their poor handling) and "The Belgrano" (for their oil leaks).

In 1981, the team retained Brian Henton and Derek Warwick from 1980's dominant F2 campaign, but the Toleman TG181 was exceptionally poor, qualifying for just two races all season. Warwick remarked that the car was "impossible to drive" and that "we weren't just slow: we were seven seconds a lap off the back row." The team failed to qualify for a race until September, when Henton made the cut for the Italian Grand Prix. Warwick qualified for the final race of the season, winning a £25,000 bet for doing so.

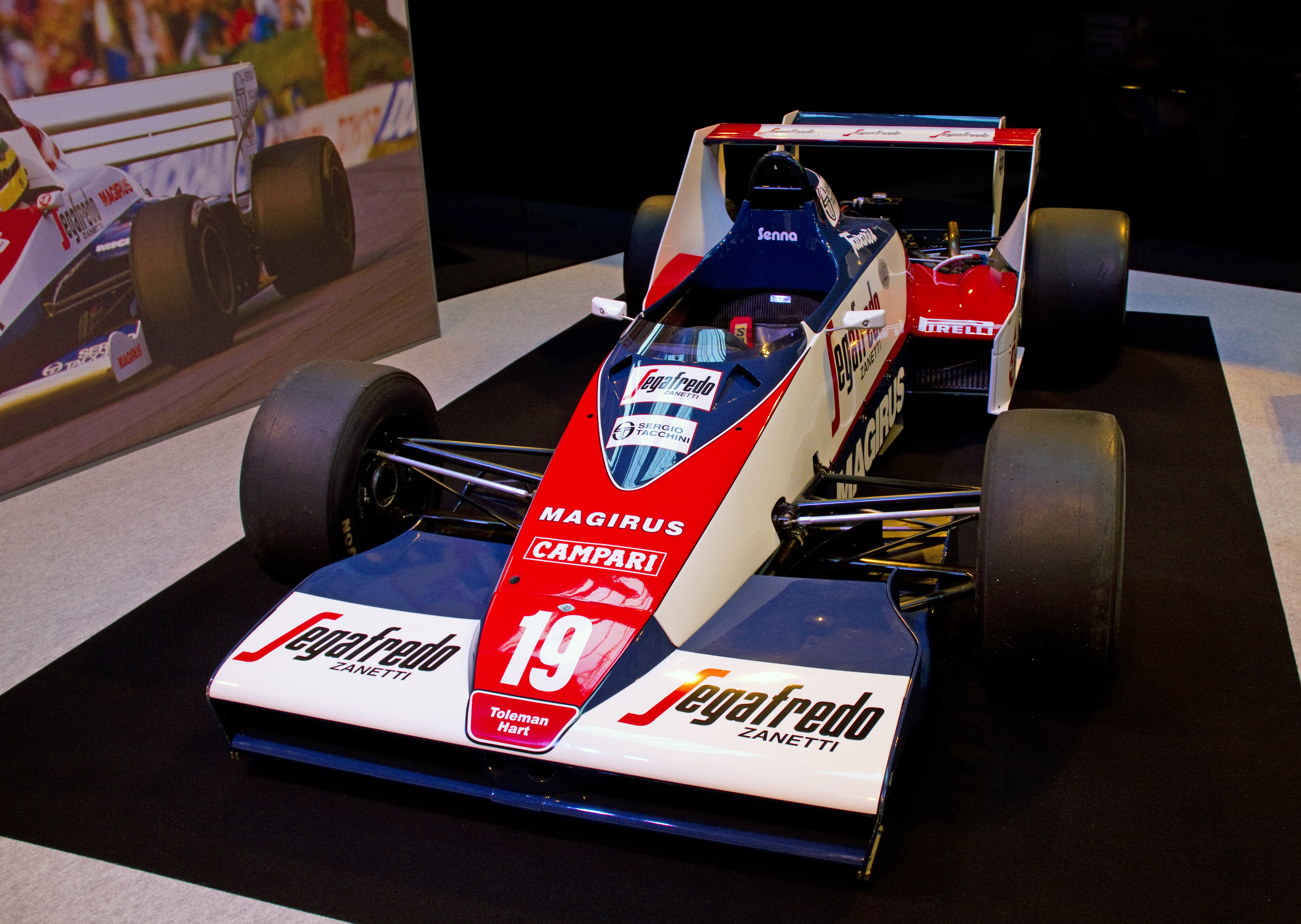
The Toleman TG183

In 1982, Henton left and was replaced by Teo Fabi. Nonetheless, the team managed to start qualifying consistently for races, but finished only two races all season, due in large part to engine reliability issues. The team used upgraded TG181Cs until the carbon-composite Toleman TG183 (the team skipped the number TG182) was ready in late August. The TG183 was used in only two Grands Prix (Italy and Las Vegas) that year, but Warwick did record the team's first fastest lap in the Dutch Grand Prix.

With sponsor Candy threatening to pull funding for 1983, the team resorted to a gimmick strategy to reach second place at the British Grand Prix, however briefly. The team started Warwick on a half-tank of petrol, giving him a speed advantage over the other drivers' fully loaded cars. Warwick knew going in that he would not finish the race, and ran out of fuel after 40 laps. The team lied to the press that Warwick had suffered a mechanical failure. Satisfied with the positive exposure, Candy agreed to stay with the team.

=== 1983: Emergence as a serious team ===
In 1983, the TG183B showed improved form thanks to a major update. Derek Warwick was retained, while Teo Fabi was replaced by Bruno Giacomelli. The budget increased as Candy's sponsorship was joined by Iveco brand Magirus and BP.

The Hart turbos finally began showing true pace, with Warwick qualifying fifth and sixth in the first two races. The team peaked at the end of the season: Warwick scored the team's first points with a fourth-place finish at the Dutch Grand Prix, kicking off a run of four consecutive scoring finishes to close out the year. Toleman finished 9th in the Constructors' Championship with ten points, putting itself a cut above the other backmarkers like Arrows, Theodore, Ligier, Spirit, ATS, Osella, and RAM, none of which scored more than four points.

=== 1984: Peaking with Ayrton Senna ===
In 1984, Warwick departed for the factory Renault team, while Giacomelli left F1 for CART. In response, the team scored a coup by signing highly touted rookie Ayrton Senna, who had just won the 1983 British Formula Three Championship. Senna tested for Toleman and immediately developed a rapport with Byrne, who begged Hawkridge to sign him. However, Senna knew that he had the talent to race for a top team – Bernie Ecclestone had considered signing him for Brabham to partner reigning Drivers' Champion Nelson Piquet, but Piquet vetoed the idea – and negotiated a relatively low £100,000 release clause from Toleman. Senna was paired with Venezuelan F2 driver and former dual Grand Prix Motorcycle World Champion Johnny Cecotto. However, Cecotto's F1 career ended mid-season when he broke both legs during practice for the British Grand Prix, and Stefan Johansson was eventually signed to finish out the season.

Toleman got off to a poor start, as the team was still using the 1983 cars for the first four races of 1984. Senna made his F1 debut at the Brazilian Grand Prix, at Jacarepaguá. He qualified an unimpressive 17th (Cecotto qualified 18th), and both drivers retired with engine failures (Senna's retirement from a blown turbo on the 9th lap was in fact F1's first retirement of the season). However, Senna rallied to score his first F1 point at round 2 in Kyalami, despite suffering major front wing damage on the opening lap. He also scored at the following race at Spa-Francorchamps, but only after Tyrrell's Stefan Bellof was disqualified from the entire season due to technical infringements.

The demanding Senna quickly grew disillusioned with the team's Pirelli tyres; no Pirelli driver scored points through round 5 of the season, except Senna. At Imola, the team sat out the first day of qualifying due to disputes with Pirelli, which along with a fuel pressure problem on the second day, contributed to Senna's failure to qualify for the race (the only time he failed to qualify in his entire career). Following the race, Senna successfully induced Toleman to break its Pirelli contract and sign with Michelin. Ironically, this decision eventually led to Toleman's demise and absorption by the Benetton Group in 1985 (see below).

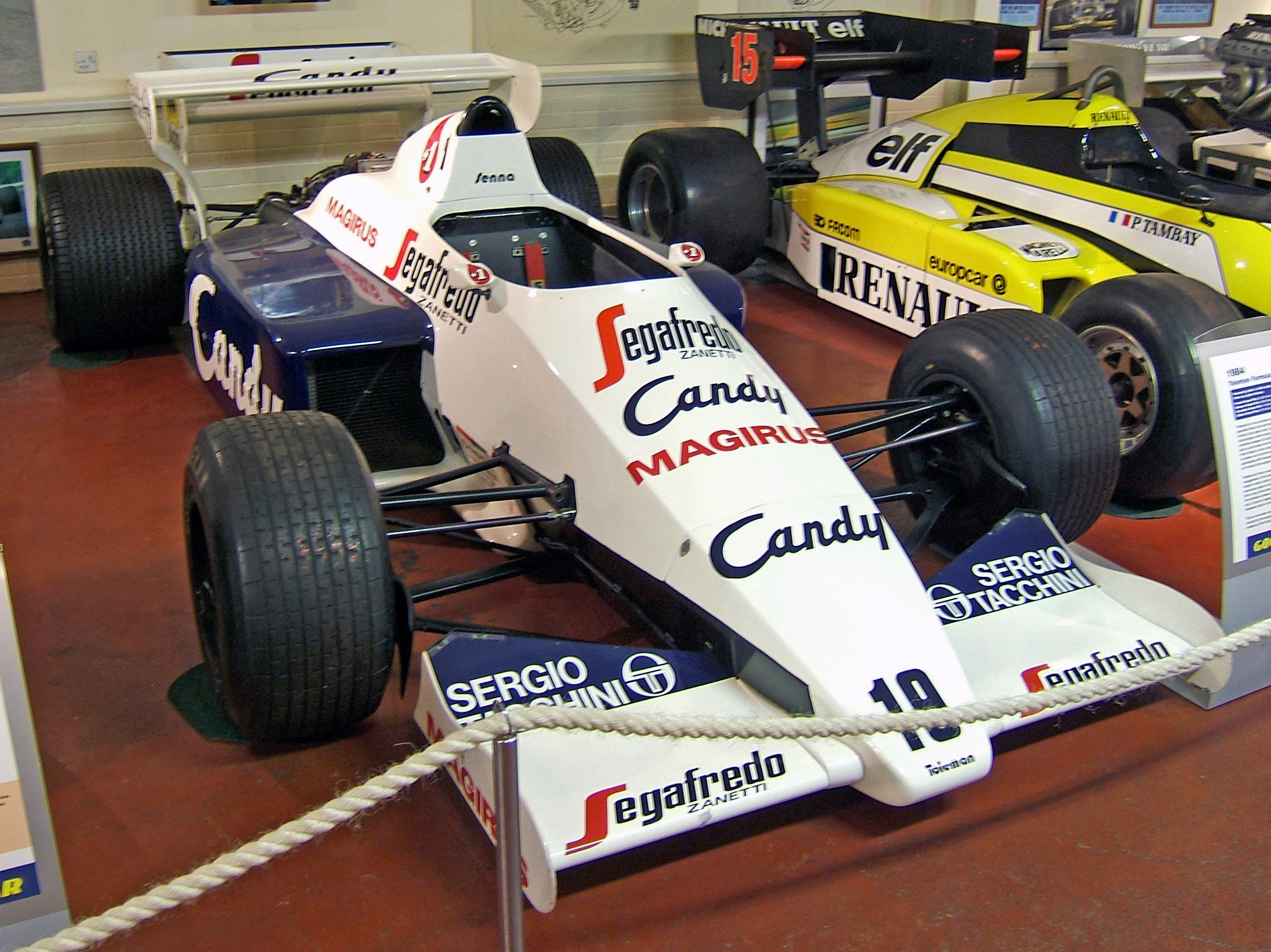
Ayrton Senna's Toleman TG184 car in which he took second place at the 1984 Monaco Grand Prix.

The TG184 and the new Michelin tyres were ready for the French Grand Prix. Although both drivers retired, Senna was delighted with the immediate improvement in performance. The very next race, Senna announced himself to the world with a dazzling second-place finish at the torrentially rain-soaked Monaco Grand Prix. When Jacky Ickx controversially called off the race after lap 31 of 77, Senna was closing in on leader Alain Prost, whose brakes were repeatedly locking up due to a deteriorating brake balance. (That said, Senna's suspension was already on the verge of failure, and Bellof's (later-disqualified) Tyrell was actually faster than Senna at the end of the race.) In the following years, a conspiracy theory developed that Ickx, a Porsche sportscar driver, called off the race to ensure that Prost's Porsche-powered McLaren would win.

The team's performance fell off in mid-season, with Senna finishing only one out of six races at one point due to mechanical failures. In addition, Cecotto finished only two out of nine races that season. The lone bright spot, of sorts, was the British Grand Prix. The weekend was marred by Cecotto's injury, but Senna qualified fourth and scored his second Formula One podium. Fighting for third, he "hound[ed] [Elio] de Angelis unmercifully" and picked up the position with two laps to go once de Angelis' engine faltered. Following the race, he received a large ovation from the Brands Hatch crowd.

Towards the end of the season, Senna announced his departure, having triggered his release clause to sign with Team Lotus. In response, Hawkridge suspended Senna for the Italian Grand Prix; release clause or not, the Brazilian was still contractually obligated to inform Toleman before negotiating with other teams. Pierluigi Martini filled in for Senna at Monza. Cecotto's belated replacement Stefan Johansson made his way from 17th place to 4th in his Toleman debut, while Martini failed to qualify. Senna returned to the team for the final two races and finished off the year in style with a third podium at the Portuguese Grand Prix.

Although not much was expected from the team who started the year with only their upgraded 1983 car and also with two untried rookie drivers, plus the underpowered Hart turbo engine, Toleman finished a career-best 7th in the Constructors' Championship, scoring 16 points (13 courtesy of Senna, the other 3 from Johansson's 4th place in Italy). Senna also recorded the only three podiums in the team's history.

=== 1985: Near-collapse and sale to Benetton ===
Following Senna's departure, the Toleman team sought to maintain its momentum by retaining Johansson and signing John Watson for the 1985 season. In addition, that year's TG185 was the first carbon monocoque to be fabricated in-house at the Witney factory.

However, the team nearly collapsed. Michelin withdrew from F1 at the end of 1984, forcing the team to confront the fact that it had alienated every remaining tyre supplier in Formula One. Pirelli was unwilling to supply Toleman again after the events of 1984, and Goodyear was also upset at Hawkridge due to the manner in which Toleman switched from Goodyear to Pirelli in Formula Two. Without F1-quality tyres, Toleman was forced to sit out the first three races of the 1985 season. The team parted ways with both drivers: Johansson quit the team to join Tyrell and later Ferrari, and Watson unsuccessfully asked to be paid for the races Toleman was unable to enter for tyre reasons.

Toleman returned in round 4 at Monaco, after Italian fashion label United Colors of Benetton bought the team in mid-season and acquired a Pirelli supply contract from the defunct Spirit team. Benetton kept the Toleman name until season's-end. The team initially lacked the funds to run multiple cars, so Teo Fabi was Toleman's sole driver for the first six races. Piercarlo Ghinzani joined Fabi for the final seven races. Toleman's final year in F1 was as unsuccessful as its early years, as the team finished only two races and scored no points. The team's last hurrah was Fabi's pole position at the German Grand Prix.

== Legacy ==
When Ted Toleman sold the team to Benetton, the Italians promised to keep the staff together. Rory Byrne and Pat Symonds, in particular, remained with the newly rebranded Benetton Formula, which proceeded to hire a new crop of talent, including Flavio Briatore and Ross Brawn. Led by Michael Schumacher, the Benetton team won two Drivers' Championships and one Constructors' Championship in the 1990s. Schumacher took Byrne and Brawn with him to Ferrari, and the two helped lead the turn-of-the-century Ferrari dynasty. Symonds and Briatore stayed with Benetton, which was later renamed to Renault (colloquially, "Team Enstone" after Benetton opened a new factory in Enstone, Oxfordshire). With new star Fernando Alonso, Renault won two Drivers' Championships and two Constructors' Championships in the 2000s.

The original Toleman leadership (Toleman and Hawkridge) did not compete in Formula One again. Ted Toleman left England in 1993, but intermittently remained involved in motor racing, managing the Australian Mini Challenge one make series. Alex Hawkridge eventually chaired a company that used racing simulators to coach aspiring drivers.

== Complete Formula One results ==
(key)

Year	Chassis	Engines	Tyres	Drivers	1	2	3	4	5	6	7	8	9	10	11	12	13	14	15	16	Points	WCC
1981	TG181	Hart 415T 1.5 L4 t	P		USW	BRA	ARG	SMR	BEL	MON	ESP	FRA	GBR	GER	AUT	NED	ITA	CAN	CPL		0	NC
1981	TG181	Hart 415T 1.5 L4 t	P	(United Kingdom) Brian Henton				DNQ	DNQ	DNPQ	DNQ	DNQ	DNQ	DNQ	DNQ	DNQ	10	DNQ	DNQ		0	NC
1981	TG181	Hart 415T 1.5 L4 t	P	(United Kingdom) Derek Warwick				DNQ	DNQ	DNPQ	DNQ	DNQ	DNQ	DNQ	DNQ	DNQ	DNQ	DNQ	Ret		0	NC
1982	TG181B; TG181C; TG183	Hart 415T 1.5 L4 t	P		RSA	BRA	USW	SMR	BEL	MON	DET	CAN	NED	GBR	FRA	GER	AUT	SUI	ITA	CPL	0	NC
1982	TG181B; TG181C; TG183	Hart 415T 1.5 L4 t	P	(United Kingdom) Derek Warwick	Ret	DNQ	DNPQ	Ret	Ret	DNQ			Ret^{F}	Ret	15	10	Ret	Ret	Ret	Ret	0	NC
1982	TG181B; TG181C; TG183	Hart 415T 1.5 L4 t	P	(Italy) Teo Fabi	DNQ	DNQ	DNQ	NC	Ret	DNPQ			DNQ	Ret	Ret	DNQ	Ret	Ret	Ret	DNQ	0	NC
1983	TG183; TG183B	Hart 415T 1.5 L4 t	P		BRA	USW	FRA	SMR	MON	BEL	DET	CAN	GBR	GER	AUT	NED	ITA	EUR	RSA		10	9th
1983	TG183; TG183B	Hart 415T 1.5 L4 t	P	(United Kingdom) Derek Warwick	8	Ret	Ret	Ret	Ret	7	Ret	Ret	Ret	Ret	Ret	4	6	5	4		10	9th
1983	TG183; TG183B	Hart 415T 1.5 L4 t	P	(Italy) Bruno Giacomelli	Ret	Ret	13^{†}	Ret	DNQ	8	9	Ret	Ret	Ret	Ret	13	7	6	Ret		10	9th
1984	TG183B; TG184	Hart 415T 1.5 L4 t	P M		BRA	RSA	BEL	SMR	FRA	MON	CAN	DET	DAL	GBR	GER	AUT	NED	ITA	EUR	POR	16	7th
1984	TG183B; TG184	Hart 415T 1.5 L4 t	P M	(Brazil) Ayrton Senna	Ret	6	6	DNQ	Ret	2^{F}^{‡}	7	Ret	Ret	3	Ret	Ret	Ret		Ret	3	16	7th
1984	TG183B; TG184	Hart 415T 1.5 L4 t	P M	(Sweden) Stefan Johansson														4	Ret	11	16	7th
1984	TG183B; TG184	Hart 415T 1.5 L4 t	P M	(Venezuela) Johnny Cecotto	Ret	Ret	Ret	NC	Ret	Ret	9	Ret	Ret	DNQ							16	7th
1984	TG183B; TG184	Hart 415T 1.5 L4 t	P M	(Italy) Pierluigi Martini														DNQ			16	7th
1985	TG185	Hart 415T 1.5 L4 t	P		BRA	POR	SMR	MON	CAN	DET	FRA	GBR	GER	AUT	NED	ITA	BEL	EUR	RSA	AUS	0	NC
1985	TG185	Hart 415T 1.5 L4 t	P	(Italy) Teo Fabi				Ret	Ret	Ret	14^{†}	Ret	Ret^{P}	Ret	Ret	12	Ret	Ret	Ret	Ret	0	NC
1985	TG185	Hart 415T 1.5 L4 t	P	(Italy) Piercarlo Ghinzani										DNS	Ret	DNS	Ret	Ret	Ret	Ret	0	NC

Notes

- † – The driver did not finish the Grand Prix, but was classified, as he completed over 90% of the race distance.
- ‡ – Half points awarded as less than 75% of the race distance was completed.
