= Elio de Angelis =

Italian racing driver (1958–1986)

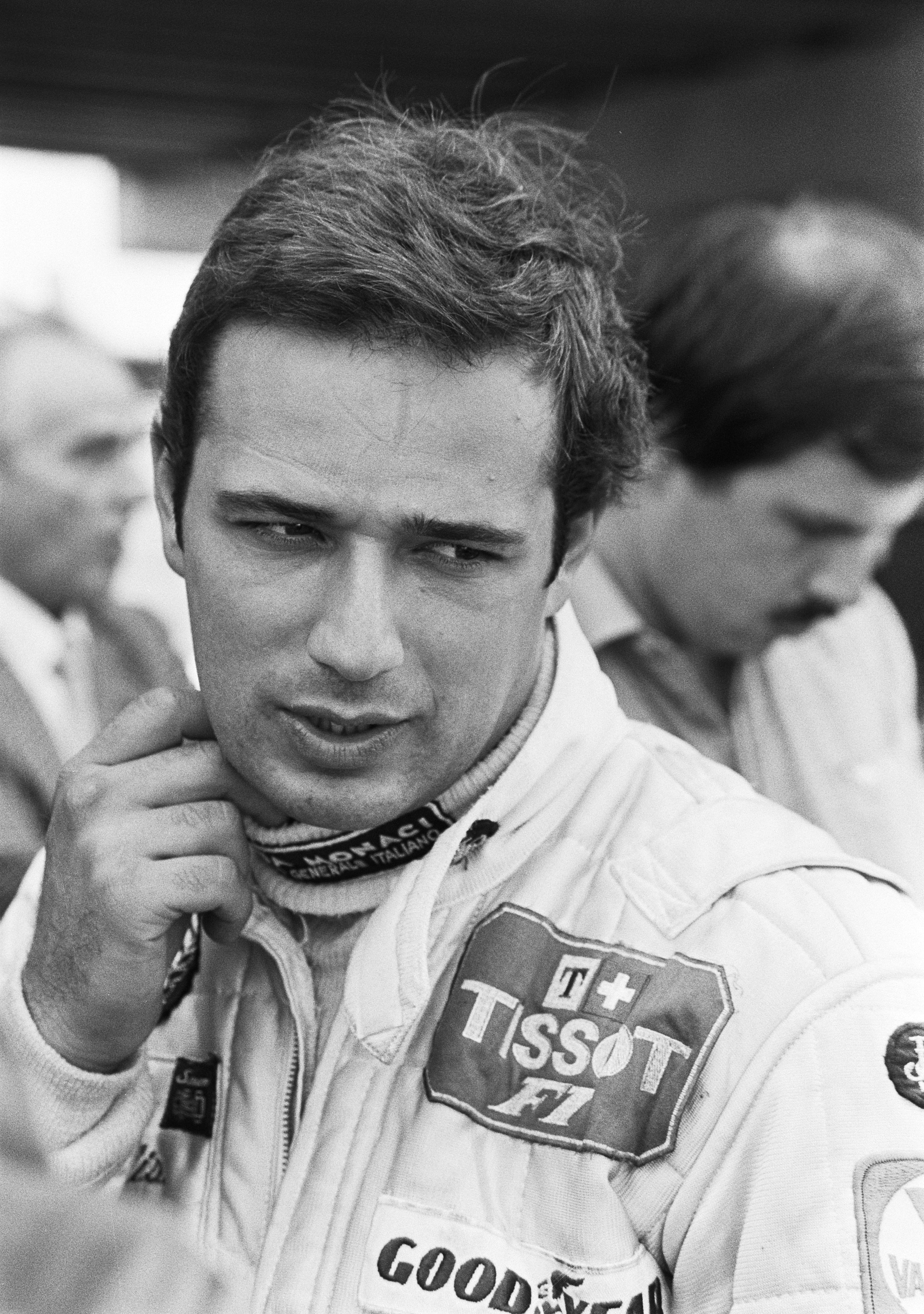
- De Angelis at the 1982 Dutch Grand Prix
- Born: 26 March 1958; Rome, Italy
- Died: 15 May 1986 (aged 28); Marseille, France
- Cause of death: Injuries sustained while testing at Circuit Paul Ricard
- Partners: Ute Kittelberger (1981–1986; his death)

Formula One World Championship career
- Nationality: (Italy) Italian
- Active years: 1979–1986
- Team(s): Shadow, Lotus, Brabham
- Entries: 109 (108 starts)
- Championships: 0
- Wins: 2
- Podiums: 9
- Career points: 122
- Pole positions: 3
- Fastest laps: 0
- First entry: 1979 Argentine Grand Prix
- First win: 1982 Austrian Grand Prix
- Last win: 1985 San Marino Grand Prix
- Last entry: 1986 Monaco Grand Prix

Elio de Angelis (26 March 1958 – 15 May 1986) was an Italian racing driver, who competed in Formula One from 1979 to 1986.

In Formula One, De Angelis drove for Shadow, Lotus and Brabham, winning two Grands Prix across eight seasons. He finished third in the 1984 World Drivers' Championship with Lotus. De Angelis was a competitive and highly popular presence in Formula One during the 1980s, and is sometimes referred to as Formula One's "last gentleman player".

In May 1986, de Angelis was killed in an accident whilst testing the Brabham BT55 at Paul Ricard.

== Early life ==
De Angelis was born in Rome. His father Giulio was a wealthy real estate developer and an inshore and offshore powerboat racer who won many world championships in the 1960s and 1970s.

After a brief spell with karts, de Angelis went on to win the Italian Formula Three Championship in 1977. In 1978, he raced in Formula Two for Minardi and then for the ICI British F2 Team, he also competed in one round of the British Formula One championship and won the prestigious Monaco F3 race.

== Formula One ==
At the end of the 1977 season, 19 year old de Angelis was on Enzo Ferrari's short list to replace Niki Lauda. De Angelis successfully tested the Ferrari at Fiorano Circuit but eventually Ferrari decided to hire Gilles Villeneuve. De Angelis's debut Formula One season was in 1979 with Shadow. He finished seventh in his maiden Grand Prix in Argentina and 15th in the championship with three points.

De Angelis's performance with Shadow caught the eye of Lotus boss Colin Chapman, who hired him to partner Mario Andretti in 1980. At the age of 21, de Angelis became the youngest Grand Prix podium finisher of all time when he finished second at the Brazilian Grand Prix, run at the Interlagos circuit.

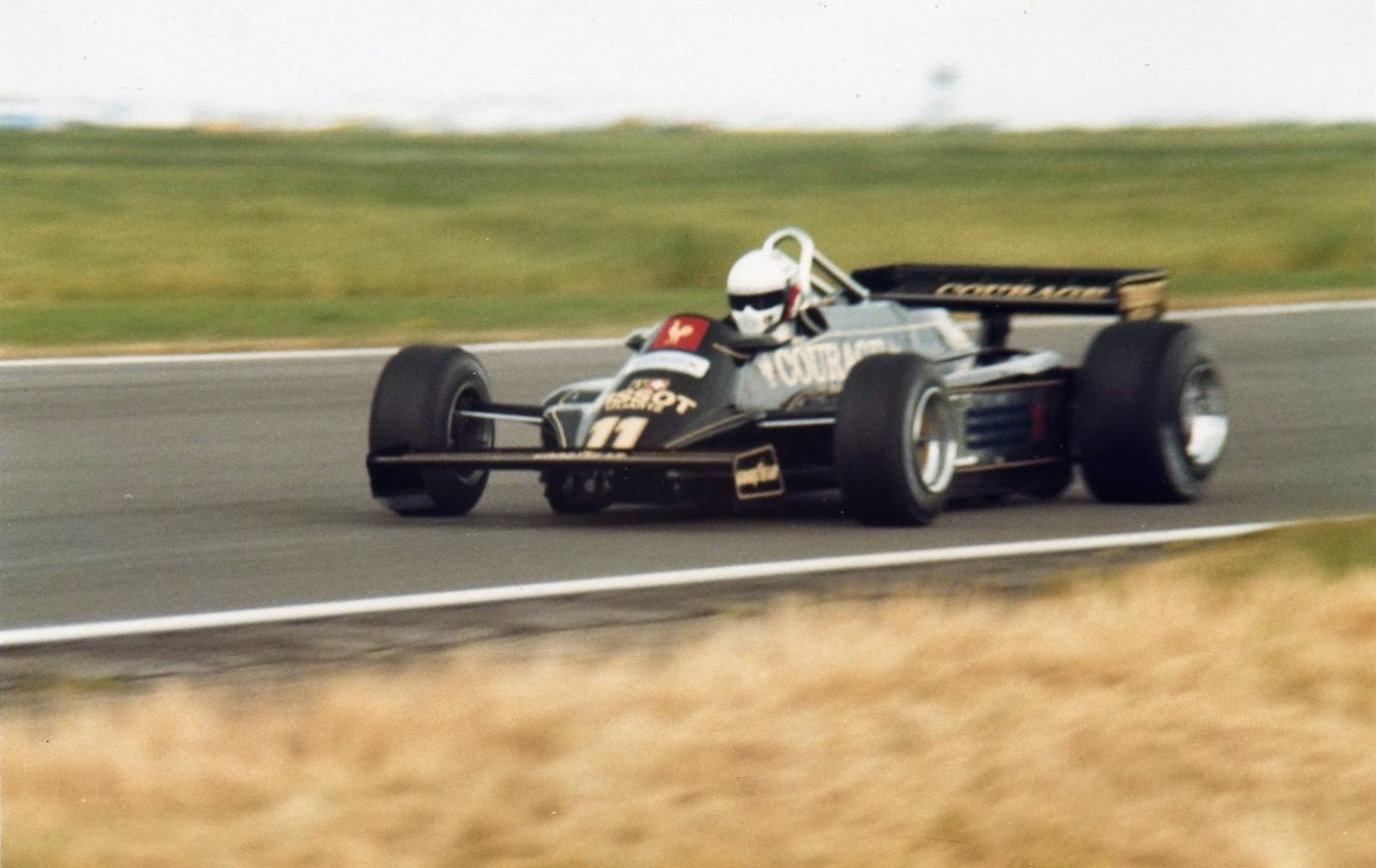
De Angelis driving for Lotus at the 1981 British Grand Prix

De Angelis's first victory came in the 1982 Austrian Grand Prix at the Österreichring, 0.05 seconds ahead of the Williams of eventual 1982 World Champion Keke Rosberg. The win was the last hailed by Colin Chapman's act of throwing his cloth cap into the air. Chapman died in December that year and Peter Warr became the new Lotus team manager.

In 1983, Lotus switched from the Cosworth DFV they had been using since 1967, to Renault F1 turbo engines, but it was a disappointing season, suffering multiple mechanical failures. De Angelis's best result was a fifth place in the 1983 Italian Grand Prix.

In 1984, de Angelis had a much better season, scoring a total of 34 points and finishing third in the standings with three podiums. His best result was a second place at the Detroit Grand Prix. De Angelis was the only driver to finish in the top-five in 1984 not to score a race win, showing his consistent performances throughout the season with the improving Lotus-Renault.

In 1985, de Angelis was joined at Lotus by Ayrton Senna, who had left the Toleman team. De Angelis's second win came in the third race of the season, at the 1985 San Marino Grand Prix, after Alain Prost was disqualified when his McLaren MP4/2B was found 2 kg underweight. De Angelis also claimed his last Formula One pole position that year in Canada. He finished fifth in the championship, with 33 points, five points behind his teammate. However, de Angelis chose to leave Lotus at the end of the season, frustrated that the team's efforts were being focused mostly on Senna.

De Angelis's drive for 1986 was with Brabham, as a replacement for twice World Champion Nelson Piquet, who had moved to Williams to join de Angelis's former Lotus teammate Nigel Mansell. Fellow Italian Riccardo Patrese was his teammate. Patrese was returning to the Bernie Ecclestone owned team after two unhappy years with Alfa Romeo.

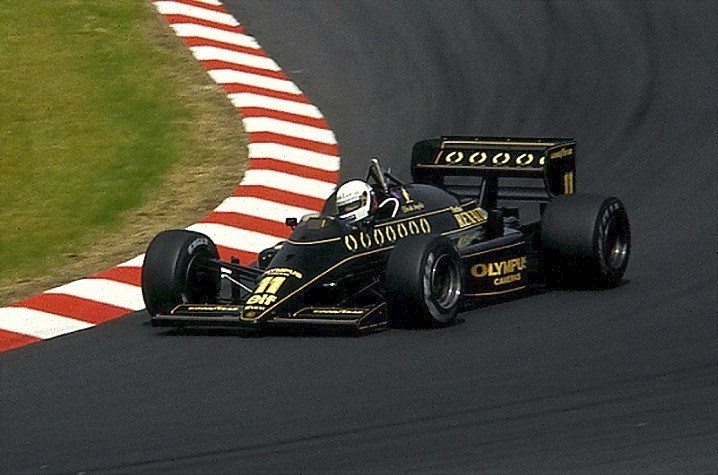
De Angelis driving for Team Lotus at the 1985 German Grand Prix

The 1986 Brabham-BMW, the BT55, was the brainchild of long time Brabham designer Gordon Murray. The BT55 was a lowline car with a reduced frontal area, the idea being to have a cleaner airflow over the car to create more downforce, while at the same time reducing the car's drag. The chassis proved effective, unlike the I4 BMW turbo that had to be tilted to an angle of 72°. This caused severe oil surge and an even greater lack of throttle response than the BMW had become famous for. Although the team worked hard to overcome these problems, it was clear from early in the season that Brabham had fallen behind the leading pack.

== Death and aftermath ==
On 14 May 1986 (three days after the Monaco Grand Prix, in which de Angelis retired on lap 31 due to an engine failure), during tests at the Paul Ricard circuit in France, around noon, the rear wing of de Angelis's BT55 detached at high speed resulting in the car losing downforce on the rear wheels, which instigated a cartwheel over a crash barrier, causing the car to catch fire. The impact itself did not kill de Angelis but he was unable to extract himself from the car unassisted. The situation was exacerbated by the lack of track marshals on the circuit who could have provided him with emergency assistance. A 30-minute delay ensued before a helicopter arrived and de Angelis died 29 hours later, at the hospital in Marseille where he had been taken, from smoke inhalation. His actual crash impact injuries were only a broken collar bone and light burns on his back.

De Angelis's death also saw the end of Formula One using the full 5.812 km (3.612 mi) Paul Ricard Circuit. F1 cars started using the 3.812 km (2.369 mi) "Club" version of the circuit, bypassing the Verriere curves where the Brabham had crashed, and cutting the length of the Mistral Straight from 1.8 to 1 km in length. The move was unpopular with many of the drivers, although others did like the reduced straight length as it was easier on the engines. Paul Ricard would not host a race on the full layout until 2018, which featured sharper Verriere curves and a chicane on Mistral effectively cutting the straight to two 800m straights.

De Angelis's place in the Brabham team was subsequently taken by Derek Warwick, allegedly because Warwick was the only available top level driver who did not contact team owner Bernie Ecclestone immediately after de Angelis's death asking to replace him. McLaren driver Keke Rosberg, who was a close friend of de Angelis, retired at the end of the 1986 season.

De Angelis was the last driver to die in a Formula One car until Roland Ratzenberger died during qualifying for the San Marino Grand Prix at Imola eight years later. The day after Ratzenberger's death, de Angelis's former Lotus teammate and three times World Champion Ayrton Senna died from injuries sustained in a crash on the seventh lap when his Williams-Renault crashed into the Tamburello Curve wall at approximately 130 mph (209 km/h).

De Angelis's funeral took place on 18 May 1986, attended by such as team managers Ken Tyrrell, Peter Collins, Ron Dennis, Jack Brabham, and Frank Williams, and driver-manager Jackie Stewart. The pallbearers included drivers: Gerhard Berger, Michele Alboreto, Niki Lauda, Alain Prost, Ayrton Senna, Keke Rosberg, Nelson Piquet, Roberto Moreno, Derek Warwick, Riccardo Patrese, Nigel Mansell, Martin Brundle, Patrick Tambay and Emerson Fittipaldi. Neither Sid Watkins, nor the Brabham team coordinator, could bear to attend because they were so grief-stricken.

De Angelis was buried in the Verano Monumental Cemetery in Rome.

== Legacy ==
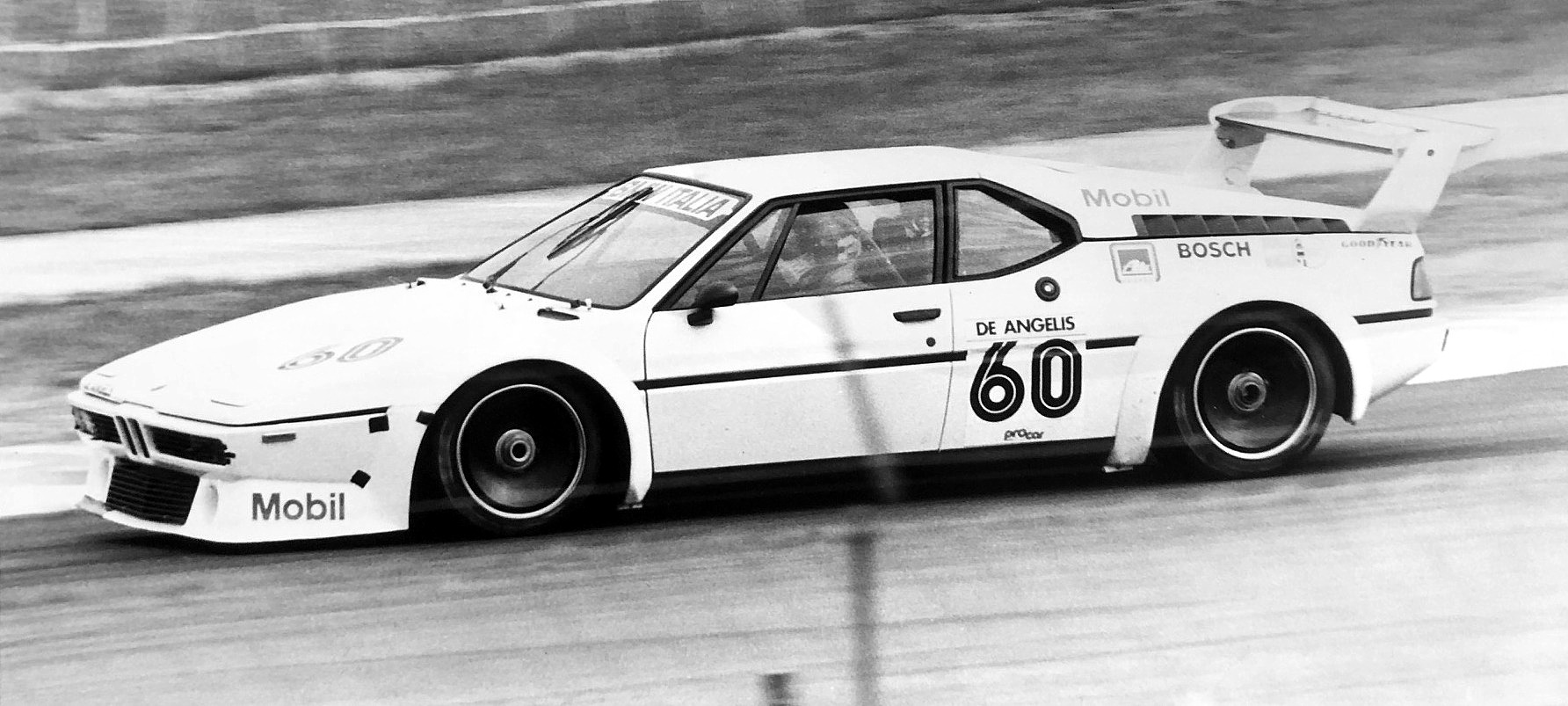
De Angelis won the inaugural BMW M1 Procar race at Zolder. Here he can be seen competing at Silverstone.

De Angelis was a concert-standard pianist, and famously kept his fellow Formula One drivers entertained with his skills by playing multiple concertos by Chopin and Mozart, while they locked themselves in a Johannesburg hotel before the 1982 South African Grand Prix at Kyalami when the Grand Prix Drivers Association held a strike in protest at the new Super Licence conditions imposed by the governing body, the FIA.

The French-Italian driver Jean Alesi, who broke into the sport in 1989, wore a helmet that matched de Angelis's design, in tribute to his semi-compatriot.

In 2017, de Angelis was honoured at the Ludovico Scarfiotti Memorial in Rome.

== Racing record ==
=== Career summary ===
Season	Series	Team	Races	Wins	Poles	F/Laps	Podiums	Points	Position
1977	Italian Formula Three	Trivellato Racing	12	4	2	2	5	45	**1st**
1977	European Formula Three	Valtellina Racing	14	1	2	4	1	18	7th
1978	European Formula Two	Chevron Racing	12	0	0	0	0	4	14th
1979	Formula One	Interscope Shadow Racing; Shadow Racing	14	0	0	0	0	3	15th
1979	BMW M1 Procar Championship	BMW Italia	4	1	0	0	1	20	13th
1980	Formula One	Team Essex Lotus	14	0	0	0	1	13	7th
1981	Formula One	Team Essex Lotus	5	0	0	0	0	14	8th
1981	Formula One	John Player Team Lotus	9	0	0	0	0	14	8th
1982	Formula One	John Player Team Lotus	15	1	0	0	1	23	9th
1983	Formula One	John Player Special Team Lotus	15	0	1	0	0	2	17th
1984	Formula One	John Player Special Team Lotus	16	0	1	0	4	34	**3rd**
1985	Formula One	John Player Special Team Lotus	16	1	1	0	3	33	5th
1986	Formula One	Olivetti Brabham	4	0	0	0	0	0	NC

=== Formula One World Championship results ===
(key) (Races in bold indicate pole position)

Year	Entrant	Chassis	Engine	1	2	3	4	5	6	7	8	9	10	11	12	13	14	15	16	WDC	Pts.
1979	Interscope Shadow Racing	Shadow DN9	Ford Cosworth DFV 3.0 V8	ARG; 7	BRA; 12	RSA; Ret														15th=	3
1979	Shadow Racing	Shadow DN9	Ford Cosworth DFV 3.0 V8				USW; 7	ESP; Ret	BEL; Ret	MON; DNQ	FRA; 16	GBR; 12	GER; 11	AUT; Ret	NED; Ret	ITA; Ret	CAN; Ret	USA; 4		15th=	3
1980	Team Essex Lotus	Lotus 81	Ford Cosworth DFV 3.0 V8	ARG; Ret	BRA; 2	RSA; Ret	USW; Ret	BEL; 10	MON; 9	FRA; Ret	GBR; Ret	GER; 16	AUT; 6	NED; Ret	ITA; 4	CAN; 10	USA; 4			7th	13
1981	Team Essex Lotus	Lotus 81	Ford Cosworth DFV 3.0 V8	USW; Ret	BRA; 5	ARG; 6	SMR; WD	BEL; 5												8th	14
1981	Team Essex Lotus	Lotus 87	Ford Cosworth DFV 3.0 V8						MON; Ret											8th	14
1981	John Player Team Lotus	Lotus 87	Ford Cosworth DFV 3.0 V8							ESP; 5	FRA; 6	GBR; DSQ	GER; 7	AUT; 7	NED; 5	ITA; 4	CAN; 6	CPL; Ret		8th	14
1982	John Player Team Lotus	Lotus 87B	Ford Cosworth DFV 3.0 V8	RSA; 8																9th	23
1982	John Player Team Lotus	Lotus 91	Ford Cosworth DFV 3.0 V8		BRA; Ret	USW; 5	SMR	BEL; 4	MON; 5	DET; Ret	CAN; 4	NED; Ret	GBR; 4	FRA; Ret	GER; Ret	AUT; 1	SUI; 6	ITA; Ret	CPL; Ret	9th	23
1983	John Player Special Team Lotus	Lotus 91	Ford Cosworth DFV 3.0 V8	BRA; DSQ																17th	2
1983	John Player Special Team Lotus	Lotus 93T	Renault-Gordini EF1 1.5 V6 turbo		USW; Ret	FRA; Ret	SMR; Ret	MON; Ret	BEL; 9	DET; Ret	CAN; Ret									17th	2
1983	John Player Special Team Lotus	Lotus 94T	Renault-Gordini EF1 1.5 V6 turbo									GBR; Ret	GER; Ret	AUT; Ret	NED; Ret	ITA; 5	**EUR**; Ret	RSA; Ret		17th	2
1984	John Player Special Team Lotus	Lotus 95T	Renault EF4 1.5 V6 turbo	**BRA**; 3	RSA; 7	BEL; 5	SMR; 3	FRA; 5	MON; 5^{‡}	CAN; 4	DET; 2	DAL; 3	GBR; 4	GER; Ret	AUT; Ret	NED; 4	ITA; Ret	EUR; Ret	POR; 5	**3rd**	**34**
1985	John Player Special Team Lotus	Lotus 97T	Renault EF4B / EF15 1.5 V6 turbo	BRA; 3	POR; 4	SMR; 1	MON; 3	**CAN**; 5	DET; 5	FRA; 5	GBR; NC	GER; Ret	AUT; 5	NED; 5	ITA; 6	BEL; Ret	EUR; 5	RSA; Ret	AUS; DSQ	5th	33
1986	Olivetti Brabham	Brabham BT55	BMW M12/13 1.5 L4 turbo	BRA; 8	ESP; Ret	SMR; Ret	MON; Ret	BEL	CAN	DET	FRA	GBR	GER	HUN	AUT	ITA	POR	MEX	AUS	NC	0

- ‡ Race was stopped with less than 75% of laps completed, half points awarded.

=== Non-championship Formula One results ===
(key) (Races in bold indicate pole position; races in italics indicate fastest lap.)

Year	Entrant	Chassis	Engine	1	2	3
1979	Shadow Racing	Shadow DN9	Ford Cosworth DFV 3.0 V8	ROC; 6	GNM	DIN; Ret
1980	Team Essex Lotus	Lotus 81	Ford Cosworth DFV 3.0 V8	ESP; 3	AUS	
1981	Team Essex Lotus	Lotus 81	Ford Cosworth DFV 3.0 V8	RSA; 3		

Sporting positions
Preceded by Riccardo Patrese	Italian Formula Three; Champion; 1977	Succeeded by Siegfried Stohr
Preceded by Didier Pironi	Monaco Formula Three; Winner; 1978	Succeeded by Alain Prost
Preceded by Riccardo Paletti	Formula One fatal accidents 15 May 1986	Succeeded by Roland Ratzenberger
Records
Preceded by Bruce McLaren; 21 years, 322 days (1959 British GP)	Youngest driver to score a podium position in Formula One; 21 years, 307 days (1980 Brazilian Grand Prix)	Succeeded by Ralf Schumacher; 21 years, 287 days (1997 Argentine GP)
