= 1982 Swiss Grand Prix =

- Race 14 of 16 in the 1982 Formula One World Championship

Race details
- Date: 29 August 1982
- Location: Dijon, France
- Course length: 3.801 km (2.361 miles)
- Distance: 80 laps, 304.08 km (188.88 miles)
- Weather: Dry

Pole position
Driver	(France) Alain Prost	Renault
- Time: 1:01.380

Fastest lap
Driver	(France) Alain Prost	Renault
- Time: 1:07.477 on lap 2

Podium
First	(Finland) Keke Rosberg	Williams-Ford
Second	(France) Alain Prost	Renault
Third	(Austria) Niki Lauda	McLaren-Ford

The 1982 Swiss Grand Prix was a Formula One motor race held at Dijon-Prenois in France on 29 August 1982. The race, contested over 80 laps, was the fourteenth race of the 1982 Formula One season and was won by Keke Rosberg, driving a Williams-Ford. This was Rosberg's first win in a Formula One World Championship Grand Prix, though he had previously won a non-championship Formula One race, the 1978 BRDC International Trophy. Alain Prost finished second in a Renault, having started from pole position, while Niki Lauda was third in a McLaren-Ford. This was the only win of the season for eventual World Champion Rosberg. The chequered flag was shown after 81 laps when the organizers / flag stand missed the leading car on lap 80.

This was the first World Championship Swiss Grand Prix since 1954 (despite it not being held in Switzerland), and the last running of the event to date. Switzerland had banned motor racing after the 1955 Le Mans disaster; as of 2021, the ban has been lifted for electric vehicles only. Patrick Tambay, Ferrari's only entry after team leader Didier Pironi's career-ending crash three weeks earlier, was unable to start due to a pinched nerve in his back. This was the last of only three times the Ferrari team did not start a World Championship race in which they entered (see also 1950 French Grand Prix and 1982 Belgian Grand Prix). Ferrari withdrew their entry so late that Chico Serra (the fastest non-qualifier) was not allowed to start.

== Classification ==
=== Qualifying ===
Pos	No	Driver	Constructor	Q1	Q2	Gap
1	15	(France) Alain Prost	Renault	1:01.380	1:07.902	—
2	16	(France) René Arnoux	Renault	1:01.740	1:07.554	+0.360
3	2	(Italy) Riccardo Patrese	Brabham-BMW	1:02.997	1:02.710	+1.330
4	8	(Austria) Niki Lauda	McLaren-Ford	1:02.984	no time	+1.604
5	22	(Italy) Andrea de Cesaris	Alfa Romeo	1:03.023	1:04.205	+1.643
6	1	(Brazil) Nelson Piquet	Brabham-BMW	1:03.366	1:03.183	+1.803
7	5	(Republic of Ireland) Derek Daly	Williams-Ford	1:04.238	1:03.291	+1.911
8	6	(Finland) Keke Rosberg	Williams-Ford	1:03.589	1:03.783	+2.209
9	23	(Italy) Bruno Giacomelli	Alfa Romeo	1:03.776	1:04.711	+2.396
10	27	(France) Patrick Tambay	Ferrari	1:03.896	no time	+2.516
11	7	(United Kingdom) John Watson	McLaren-Ford	1:03.995	1:04.711	+2.615
12	3	(Italy) Michele Alboreto	Tyrrell-Ford	1:04.069	1:04.102	+2.689
13	26	(France) Jacques Laffite	Ligier-Matra	1:04.087	1:04.897	+2.707
14	29	(Switzerland) Marc Surer	Arrows-Ford	1:04.928	1:05.158	+3.548
15	11	(Italy) Elio de Angelis	Lotus-Ford	1:04.967	1:05.437	+3.587
16	25	(United States) Eddie Cheever	Ligier-Matra	1:05.162	1:05.001	+3.621
17	31	(France) Jean-Pierre Jarier	Osella-Ford	1:05.179	1:05.318	+3.799
18	4	(United Kingdom) Brian Henton	Tyrrell-Ford	1:05.877	1:05.391	+4.011
19	14	(Colombia) Roberto Guerrero	Ensign-Ford	1:05.422	1:05.395	+4.015
20	9	(West Germany) Manfred Winkelhock	ATS-Ford	1:05.451	1:06.139	+4.071
21	35	(United Kingdom) Derek Warwick	Toleman-Hart	1:05.927	1:05.877	+4.497
22	17	(United Kingdom) Rupert Keegan	March-Ford	1:06.632	1:06.011	+4.631
23	36	(Italy) Teo Fabi	Toleman-Hart	1:06.017	1:06.102	+4.637
24	18	(Brazil) Raul Boesel	March-Ford	1:06.781	1:06.136	+4.756
25	10	(Chile) Eliseo Salazar	ATS-Ford	1:06.297	1:06.168	+4.788
26	12	(United Kingdom) Nigel Mansell	Lotus-Ford	1:06.430	1:06.211	+4.831
27	20	(Brazil) Chico Serra	Fittipaldi-Ford	1:06.590	1:06.339	+4.959
28	33	(Republic of Ireland) Tommy Byrne	Theodore-Ford	1:06.990	1:08.118	+5.610
29	30	(Italy) Mauro Baldi	Arrows-Ford	1:07.836	1:08.314	+6.456

=== Race ===
Pos	No	Driver	Constructor	Tyre	Laps	Time/Retired	Grid	Points
1	6	(Finland) Keke Rosberg	Williams-Ford	G	80	1:32:41.087	8	9
2	15	(France) Alain Prost	Renault	MI	80	+ 4.442	1	6
3	8	(Austria) Niki Lauda	McLaren-Ford	MI	80	+ 1:00.343	4	4
4	1	(Brazil) Nelson Piquet	Brabham-BMW	G	79	+ 1 Lap	6	3
5	2	(Italy) Riccardo Patrese	Brabham-BMW	G	79	+ 1 Lap	3	2
6	11	(Italy) Elio de Angelis	Lotus-Ford	G	79	+ 1 Lap	15	1
7	3	(Italy) Michele Alboreto	Tyrrell-Ford	G	79	+ 1 Lap	12	
8	12	(United Kingdom) Nigel Mansell	Lotus-Ford	G	79	+ 1 Lap	26	
9	5	(Republic of Ireland) Derek Daly	Williams-Ford	G	79	+ 1 Lap	7	
10	22	(Italy) Andrea de Cesaris	Alfa Romeo	MI	78	+ 2 Laps	5	
11	4	(United Kingdom) Brian Henton	Tyrrell-Ford	G	78	+ 2 Laps	18	
12	23	(Italy) Bruno Giacomelli	Alfa Romeo	MI	78	+ 2 Laps	9	
13	7	(United Kingdom) John Watson	McLaren-Ford	MI	77	+ 3 Laps	11	
14	10	(Chile) Eliseo Salazar	ATS-Ford	MI	76	+ 4 Laps	25	
15	29	(Switzerland) Marc Surer	Arrows-Ford	P	76	+ 4 Laps	14	
16	16	(France) René Arnoux	Renault	MI	75	Injection	2	
Ret	25	(United States) Eddie Cheever	Ligier-Matra	MI	70	Handling	16	
Ret	9	(Germany) Manfred Winkelhock	ATS-Ford	MI	55	Chassis	20	
Ret	31	(France) Jean-Pierre Jarier	Osella-Ford	P	44	Engine	17	
Ret	26	(France) Jacques Laffite	Ligier-Matra	MI	33	Handling	13	
Ret	36	(Italy) Teo Fabi	Toleman-Hart	P	31	Engine	23	
Ret	18	(Brazil) Raul Boesel	March-Ford	A	31	Water Leak	24	
Ret	17	(United Kingdom) Rupert Keegan	March-Ford	A	25	Spun Off	22	
Ret	35	(United Kingdom) Derek Warwick	Toleman-Hart	P	24	Engine	21	
Ret	14	(Colombia) Roberto Guerrero	Ensign-Ford	MI	4	Engine	19	
DNS	27	(France) Patrick Tambay	Ferrari	G		Driver Unfit	10	
DNQ	20	(Brazil) Chico Serra	Fittipaldi-Ford	P				
DNQ	33	(Republic of Ireland) Tommy Byrne	Theodore-Ford	G				
DNQ	30	(Italy) Mauro Baldi	Arrows-Ford	P				

== Notes ==
- This was the 300th Grand Prix in which an Italian driver participated. In those 300 races, Italian drivers had won 27 Grands Prix, achieved 93 podium finishes, 25 pole positions, 26 fastest laps, 7 Grand Slams and 3 World Championships.
- This was the 50th Grand Prix start and the 1st Grand Prix win for a Finnish driver.

== Championship standings after the race ==
Drivers' Championship standings

	Pos.	Driver	Points
1	1	(Finland) Keke Rosberg	42
1	2	(France) Didier Pironi	39
2	3	(France) Alain Prost	31
1	4	(United Kingdom) John Watson	30
1	5	(Austria) Niki Lauda	30

Constructors' Championship standings

Pos	Constructor	Points
1	(Italy) Ferrari	64
2	(United Kingdom) McLaren-Ford	60
3	(United Kingdom) Williams-Ford	55
4	(France) Renault	50
5	(United Kingdom) Lotus-Ford	30

- Note: Only the top five positions are included for both sets of standings.

Previous race: 1982 Austrian Grand Prix	FIA Formula One World Championship; 1982 season	Next race: 1982 Italian Grand Prix
Previous race: 1975 Swiss Grand Prix; Previous race at Dijon: 1981 French Grand Prix	Swiss Grand Prix	Next race: N/A; Next race at Dijon: 1984 French Grand Prix
