= 1982 Dutch Grand Prix =

- Race 9 of 16 in the 1982 Formula One World Championship
- The Zandvoort Circuit (1980–1989)

Race details
- Date: 3 July 1982
- Official name: XXIX Grote Prijs van Nederland
- Location: Circuit Zandvoort, Zandvoort, Netherlands
- Course: Permanent racing facility
- Course length: 4.252 km (2.642 miles)
- Distance: 72 laps, 306.144 km (190.229 miles)
- Weather: Cloudy

Pole position
Driver	(France) René Arnoux	Renault
- Time: 1:14.233

Fastest lap
Driver	(United Kingdom) Derek Warwick	Toleman-Hart
- Time: 1:19.780 on lap 13

Podium
First	(France) Didier Pironi	Ferrari
Second	(Brazil) Nelson Piquet	Brabham-BMW
Third	(Finland) Keke Rosberg	Williams-Ford

The 1982 Dutch Grand Prix was a Formula One motor race held at Zandvoort on 3 July 1982. It was the ninth race of the 1982 Formula One World Championship.

The 72-lap race was won by Frenchman Didier Pironi, driving a Ferrari, with Brazilian Nelson Piquet second in a Brabham-BMW and Finn Keke Rosberg third in a Williams-Ford.

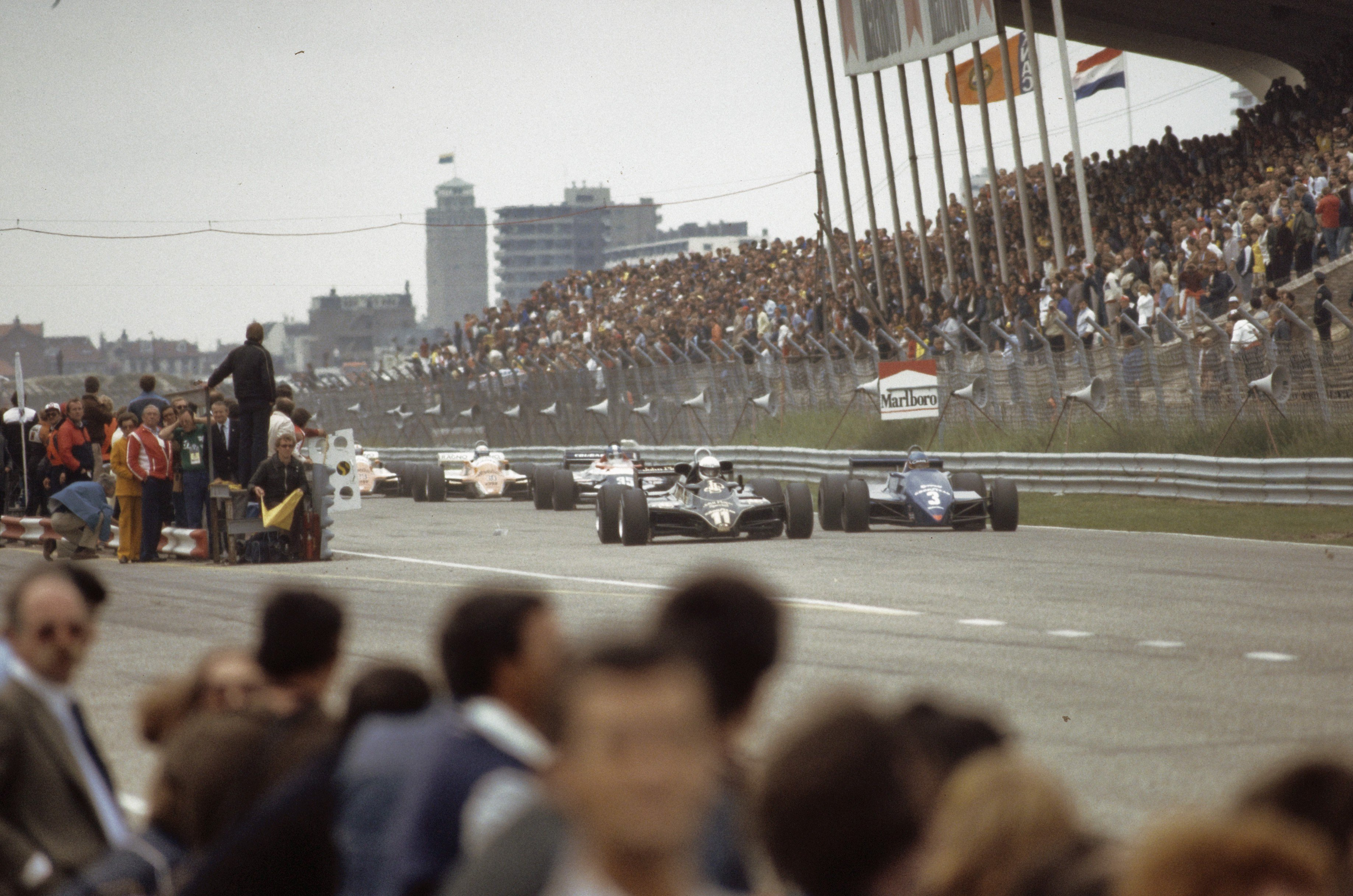
Start of the race

René Arnoux started from pole position, but he crashed out at the notorious Tarzan Corner when his Renault's throttle stuck open and he hit the tyre barriers. Arnoux walked away from the crash unharmed.

This was the first Grand Prix after the death of Riccardo Paletti three weeks earlier in Montreal. This was also the final win of Didier Pironi's Formula One career.

Ferrari entered Patrick Tambay to replace Gilles Villeneuve, who had been killed during qualifying a few race weekends prior, at the Belgian Grand Prix.

== Classification ==
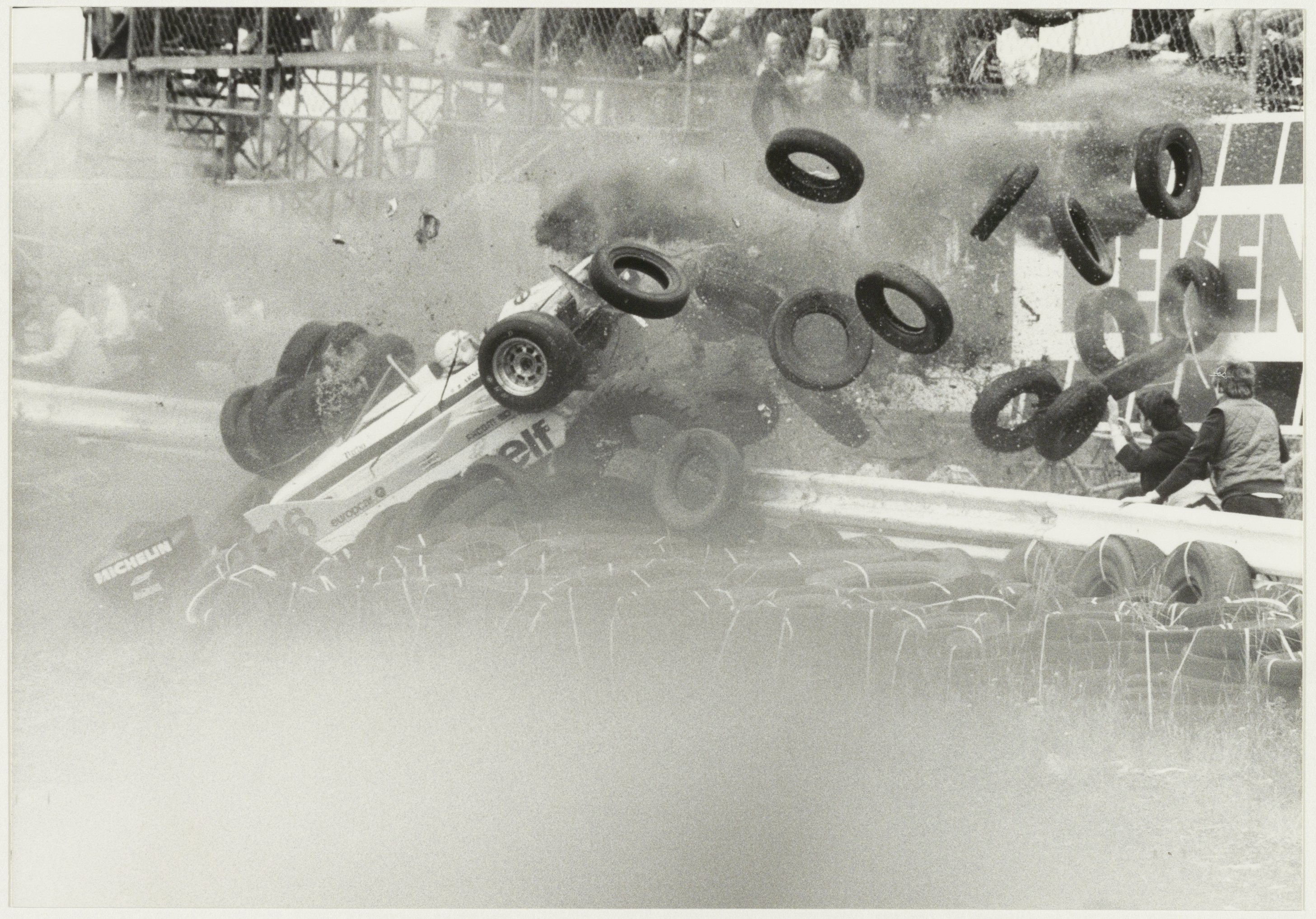
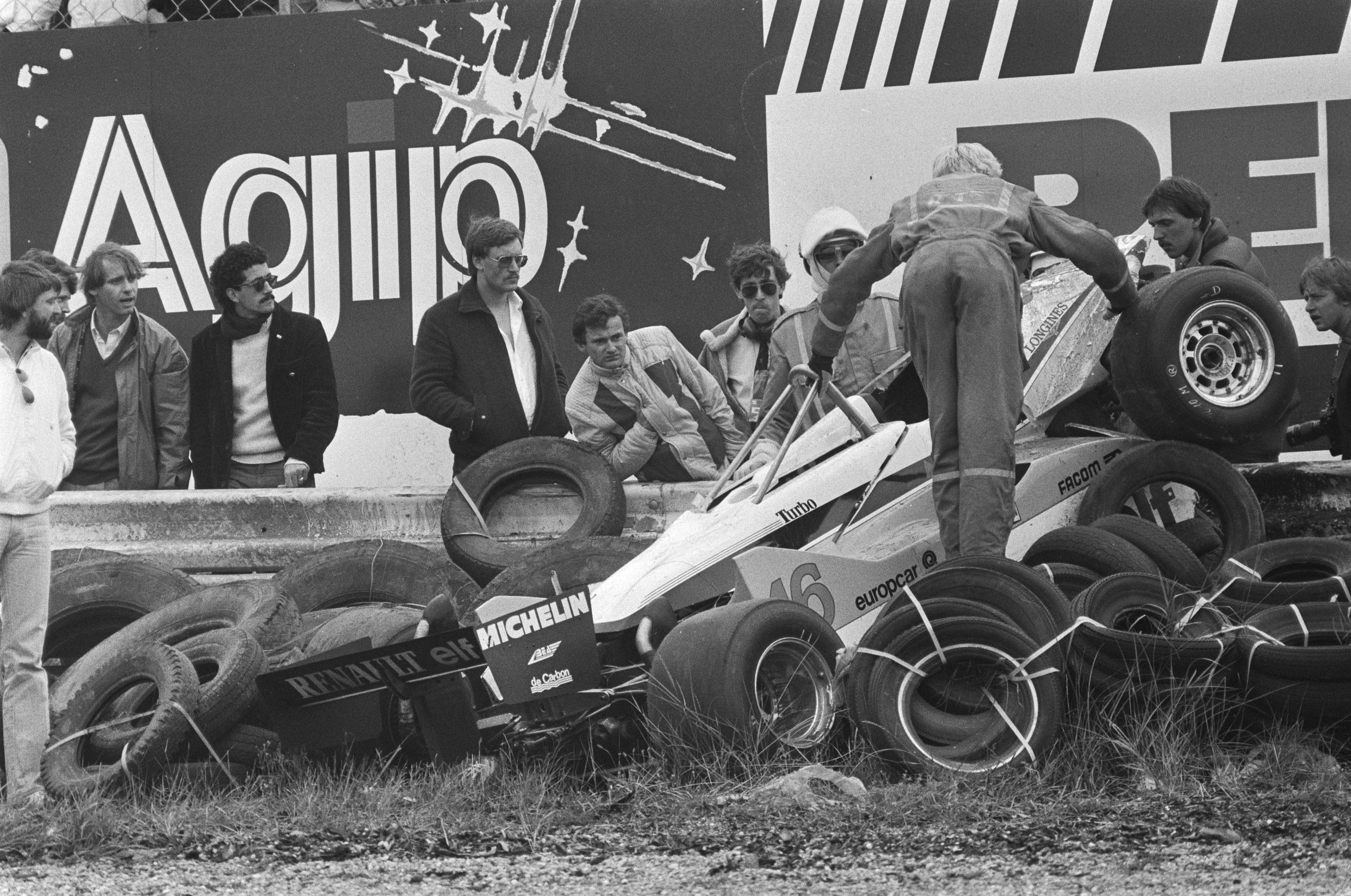
René Arnoux suffered a massive accident at Tarzan corner

=== Pre-qualifying ===
Pos	No	Driver	Constructor	Time	Gap
1	35	(United Kingdom) Derek Warwick	Toleman-Hart	1:17.890	—
2	18	(Brazil) Raul Boesel	March-Ford	1:18.039	+0.149
3	17	(Germany) Jochen Mass	March-Ford	1:18.580	+0.690
4	20	(Brazil) Chico Serra	Fittipaldi-Ford	1:19.131	+1.241
5	36	(Italy) Teo Fabi	Toleman-Hart	1:19.337	+1.447
6	31	(France) Jean-Pierre Jarier	Osella-Ford	1:20.510	+2.620
7	19	(Spain) Emilio de Villota	March-Ford	1:21.507	+3.617

=== Qualifying ===
Pos	No	Driver	Constructor	Q1	Q2	Gap
1	16	(France) René Arnoux	Renault	1:14.233	1:15.791	—
2	15	(France) Alain Prost	Renault	1:14.660	1:17.456	+0.427
3	1	(Brazil) Nelson Piquet	Brabham-BMW	1:14.723	no time	+0.490
4	28	(France) Didier Pironi	Ferrari	1:15.825	1:16.655	+1.592
5	8	(Austria) Niki Lauda	McLaren-Ford	1:15.832	1:17.653	+1.599
6	27	(France) Patrick Tambay	Ferrari	1:16.154	1:17.004	+1.921
7	6	(Finland) Keke Rosberg	Williams-Ford	1:16.260	no time	+2.027
8	23	(Italy) Bruno Giacomelli	Alfa Romeo	1:16.513	1:18.051	+2.280
9	22	(Italy) Andrea de Cesaris	Alfa Romeo	1:16.576	1:17.638	+2.343
10	2	(Italy) Riccardo Patrese	Brabham-BMW	1:16.630	1:17.502	+2.397
11	7	(United Kingdom) John Watson	McLaren-Ford	1:16.700	1:18.153	+2.467
12	5	(Republic of Ireland) Derek Daly	Williams-Ford	1:16.832	1:18.185	+2.599
13	35	(United Kingdom) Derek Warwick	Toleman-Hart	1:17.094	1:18.255	+2.861
14	3	(Italy) Michele Alboreto	Tyrrell-Ford	1:17.237	1:18.362	+3.004
15	11	(Italy) Elio de Angelis	Lotus-Ford	1:17.620	1:17.817	+3.387
16	30	(Italy) Mauro Baldi	Arrows-Ford	1:18.020	1:19.128	+3.787
17	29	(Switzerland) Marc Surer	Arrows-Ford	1:19.015	1:18.296	+4.063
18	9	(West Germany) Manfred Winkelhock	ATS-Ford	1:18.352	1:19.092	+4.119
19	20	(Brazil) Chico Serra	Fittipaldi-Ford	1:18.438	1:19.479	+4.205
20	4	(United Kingdom) Brian Henton	Tyrrell-Ford	1:18.476	1:19.304	+4.243
21	26	(France) Jacques Laffite	Ligier-Matra	1:18.487	1:18.478	+4.245
22	18	(Brazil) Raul Boesel	March-Ford	1:18.658	1:19.687	+4.425
23	31	(France) Jean-Pierre Jarier	Osella-Ford	1:18.953	1:19.753	+4.720
24	17	(Germany) Jochen Mass	March-Ford	1:19.083	1:19.907	+4.850
25	10	(Chile) Eliseo Salazar	ATS-Ford	1:19.120	1:20.169	+4.887
26	33	(Netherlands) Jan Lammers	Theodore-Ford	1:19.274	1:20.427	+5.041
27	14	(Colombia) Roberto Guerrero	Ensign-Ford	1:19.316	1:20.361	+5.083
28	36	(Italy) Teo Fabi	Toleman-Hart	1:20.425	1:19.414	+5.181
29	25	(United States) Eddie Cheever	Ligier-Matra	1:19.728	1:19.646	+5.413
30	12	(Brazil) Roberto Moreno	Lotus-Ford	1:21.149	1:22.332	+6.916

=== Race ===
Pos	No	Driver	Constructor	Tyre	Laps	Time/Retired	Grid	Points
1	28	(France) Didier Pironi	Ferrari	G	72	1:38:03.254	4	9
2	1	(Brazil) Nelson Piquet	Brabham-BMW	G	72	+ 21.649	3	6
3	6	(Finland) Keke Rosberg	Williams-Ford	G	72	+ 22.365	7	4
4	8	(Austria) Niki Lauda	McLaren-Ford	MI	72	+ 1:23.729	5	3
5	5	(Republic of Ireland) Derek Daly	Williams-Ford	G	71	+ 1 Lap	12	2
6	30	(Italy) Mauro Baldi	Arrows-Ford	P	71	+ 1 Lap	16	1
7	3	(Italy) Michele Alboreto	Tyrrell-Ford	G	71	+ 1 Lap	14	
8	27	(France) Patrick Tambay	Ferrari	G	71	+ 1 Lap	6	
9	7	(United Kingdom) John Watson	McLaren-Ford	MI	71	+ 1 Lap	11	
10	29	(Switzerland) Marc Surer	Arrows-Ford	P	71	+ 1 Lap	17	
11	23	(Italy) Bruno Giacomelli	Alfa Romeo	MI	70	+ 2 Laps	8	
12	9	(West Germany) Manfred Winkelhock	ATS-Ford	MI	70	+ 2 Laps	18	
13	10	(Chile) Eliseo Salazar	ATS-Ford	MI	70	+ 2 Laps	25	
14	31	(France) Jean-Pierre Jarier	Osella-Ford	P	69	+ 3 Laps	23	
15	2	(Italy) Riccardo Patrese	Brabham-BMW	G	69	+ 3 Laps	10	
Ret	17	(West Germany) Jochen Mass	March-Ford	A	60	Engine	24	
Ret	33	(Netherlands) Jan Lammers	Theodore-Ford	G	41	Engine	26	
Ret	11	(Italy) Elio de Angelis	Lotus-Ford	G	40	Handling	15	
Ret	22	(Italy) Andrea de Cesaris	Alfa Romeo	MI	35	Electrical	9	
Ret	15	(France) Alain Prost	Renault	MI	33	Engine	2	
Ret	16	(France) René Arnoux	Renault	MI	21	Wheel/Accident	1	
Ret	4	(United Kingdom) Brian Henton	Tyrrell-Ford	G	21	Throttle	20	
Ret	18	(Brazil) Raul Boesel	March-Ford	A	21	Engine	22	
Ret	20	(Brazil) Chico Serra	Fittipaldi-Ford	P	18	Fuel System	19	
Ret	35	(United Kingdom) Derek Warwick	Toleman-Hart	P	15	Oil Leak	13	
Ret	26	(France) Jacques Laffite	Ligier-Matra	MI	4	Handling	21	
DNQ	14	(Colombia) Roberto Guerrero	Ensign-Ford	MI				
DNQ	36	(Italy) Teo Fabi	Toleman-Hart	P				
DNQ	25	(United States) Eddie Cheever	Ligier-Matra	MI				
DNQ	12	(Brazil) Roberto Moreno	Lotus-Ford	G				
DNPQ	19	(Spain) Emilio de Villota	March-Ford	A				

== Notes ==
- This was the 100th Grand Prix start for Ligier. In those 100 races, Ligier won 8 Grands Prix, achieved 34 podium finishes, 9 pole positions, 9 fastest laps and 2 Grand Slams.
- This was the 1st fastest lap for a Toleman and for a Hart-powered car.
- This was the 7th Dutch Grand Prix win for Ferrari. It broke the previous record set by Lotus at the 1978 Dutch Grand Prix.

== Championship standings after the race ==
Drivers' Championship standings

Pos	Driver	Points
1	(United Kingdom) John Watson	30
2	(France) Didier Pironi	29
3	(Finland) Keke Rosberg	21
4	(Italy) Riccardo Patrese	19
5	(France) Alain Prost	18

Constructors' Championship standings

Pos	Constructor	Points
1	(United Kingdom) McLaren-Ford	45
2	(Italy) Ferrari	35
3	(United Kingdom) Williams-Ford	32
4	(France) Renault	22
5	(United Kingdom) Brabham-Ford	19

- Note: Only the top five positions are included for both sets of standings.

Previous race: 1982 Canadian Grand Prix	FIA Formula One World Championship; 1982 season	Next race: 1982 British Grand Prix
Previous race: 1981 Dutch Grand Prix	Dutch Grand Prix	Next race: 1983 Dutch Grand Prix
