= 1982 British Grand Prix =

- Race 10 of 16 in the 1982 Formula One World Championship

Race details
- Date: 18 July 1982
- Official name: XXXV Marlboro British Grand Prix
- Location: Brands Hatch, Kent, Great Britain
- Course: Permanent racing facility
- Course length: 4.207 km (2.614 miles)
- Distance: 76 laps, 319.719 km (198.664 miles)

Pole position
| Driver | (Finland) Keke Rosberg | Williams-Ford |
- Time: 1:09.540

Fastest lap
| Driver | (United Kingdom) Brian Henton | Tyrrell-Ford |
- Time: 1:13.028 on lap 63

Podium
| First | (Austria) Niki Lauda | McLaren-Ford |
| Second | (France) Didier Pironi | Ferrari |
| Third | (France) Patrick Tambay | Ferrari |

The 1982 British Grand Prix (formally the XXXV Marlboro British Grand Prix) was a Formula One motor race held at Brands Hatch on 18 July 1982. It was the tenth race of the 1982 Formula One World Championship.

The 76-lap race was won by Niki Lauda, driving a McLaren-Ford, after he started from fifth position. Didier Pironi finished second in a Ferrari, while teammate Patrick Tambay achieved his first podium finish by coming third. Derek Warwick stunned and delighted the British fans by taking his Toleman, a team who frequently failed to qualify for Grand Prix races during 1981 and 1982, through the field into second place before being forced to retire; he subsequently revealed that to impress its lead sponsor, Toleman had sent him out on a half-tank of fuel so that he could outpace his fully loaded competitors before running out of fuel. Pironi took over the lead of the Drivers' Championship from Lauda's teammate, John Watson, who spun off on the third lap.

== Classification ==
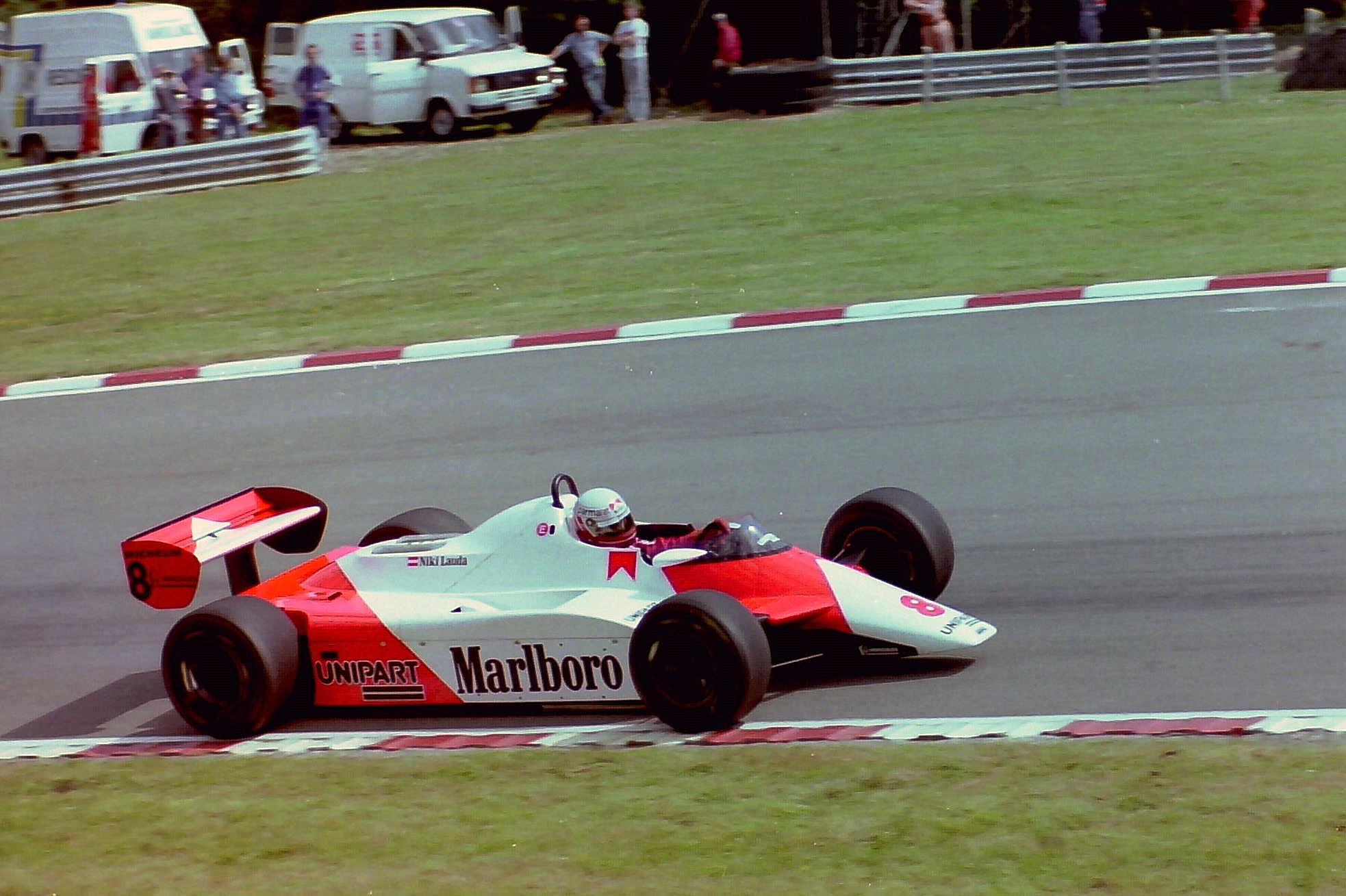
Niki Lauda won the race for McLaren.

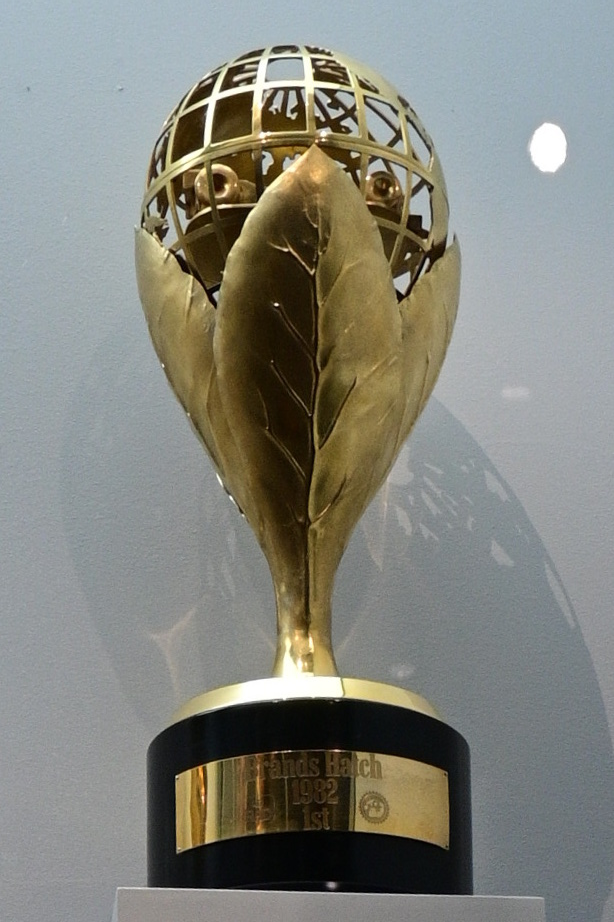
The 1982 British Grand Prix special trophy

=== Qualifying ===
| Pos | No | Driver | Constructor | Tyre | Q1 | Q2 | Gap |
|---|---|---|---|---|---|---|---|
| 1 | 6 | (Finland) Keke Rosberg | Williams-Ford | G | 1:09.540 | 1:10.663 | — |
| 2 | 2 | (Italy) Riccardo Patrese | Brabham-BMW | G | 1:10.980 | 1:09.627 | +0.087 |
| 3 | 1 | (Brazil) Nelson Piquet | Brabham-BMW | G | 1:10.418 | 1:10.060 | +0.520 |
| 4 | 28 | (France) Didier Pironi | Ferrari | G | 1:10.066 | 1:10.386 | +0.526 |
| 5 | 8 | (Austria) Niki Lauda | McLaren-Ford | MI | 1:11.303 | 1:10.638 | +1.098 |
| 6 | 16 | (France) René Arnoux | Renault | MI | 1:12.371 | 1:10.641 | +1.101 |
| 7 | 11 | (Italy) Elio de Angelis | Lotus-Ford | G | 1:10.650 | 1:10.735 | +1.110 |
| 8 | 15 | (France) Alain Prost | Renault | MI | 1:11.333 | 1:10.728 | +1.188 |
| 9 | 3 | (Italy) Michele Alboreto | Tyrrell-Ford | G | 1:11.904 | 1:10.892 | +1.352 |
| 10 | 5 | (Republic of Ireland) Derek Daly | Williams-Ford | G | 1:10.980 | 1:11.197 | +1.440 |
| 11 | 22 | (Italy) Andrea de Cesaris | Alfa Romeo | MI | 1:11.347 | 1:12.309 | +1.807 |
| 12 | 7 | (United Kingdom) John Watson | McLaren-Ford | MI | 1:11.556 | 1:11.418 | +1.878 |
| 13 | 27 | (France) Patrick Tambay | Ferrari | G | 1:11.750 | 1:11.430 | +1.890 |
| 14 | 23 | (Italy) Bruno Giacomelli | Alfa Romeo | MI | 1:11.502 | 1:15.549 | +1.962 |
| 15 | 36 | (Italy) Teo Fabi | Toleman-Hart | P | 1:12.979 | 1:11.728 | +2.188 |
| 16 | 35 | (United Kingdom) Derek Warwick | Toleman-Hart | P | 1:12.236 | 1:11.761 | +2.221 |
| 17 | 4 | (United Kingdom) Brian Henton | Tyrrell-Ford | G | 1:12.952 | 1:12.080 | +2.540 |
| 18 | 31 | (France) Jean-Pierre Jarier | Osella-Ford | P | 1:13.109 | 1:12.436 | +2.896 |
| 19 | 14 | (Colombia) Roberto Guerrero | Ensign-Ford | MI | 1:14.877 | 1:12.668 | +3.128 |
| 20 | 26 | (France) Jacques Laffite | Ligier-Matra | MI | 1:13.402 | 1:12.695 | +3.155 |
| 21 | 20 | (Brazil) Chico Serra | Fittipaldi-Ford | P | 1:13.255 | 1:13.096 | +3.556 |
| 22 | 29 | (Switzerland) Marc Surer | Arrows-Ford | P | 1:13.181 | 1:13.701 | +3.641 |
| 23 | 12 | (United Kingdom) Nigel Mansell | Lotus-Ford | G | 1:13.545 | 1:13.212 | +3.672 |
| 24 | 25 | (United States) Eddie Cheever | Ligier-Matra | MI | 1:15.977 | 1:13.301 | +3.761 |
| 25 | 17 | (Germany) Jochen Mass | March-Ford | A | 1:14.657 | 1:13.622 | +4.082 |
| 26 | 30 | (Italy) Mauro Baldi | Arrows-Ford | P | 1:15.246 | 1:13.721 | +4.181 |
| 27 | 9 | (West Germany) Manfred Winkelhock | ATS-Ford | MI | 1:13.741 | 1:15.548 | +4.201 |
| 28 | 33 | (Netherlands) Jan Lammers | Theodore-Ford | G | 1:13.815 | 1:14.303 | +4.275 |
| 29 | 10 | (Chile) Eliseo Salazar | ATS-Ford | MI | 1:15.330 | 1:13.866 | +4.326 |
| 30 | 18 | (Brazil) Raul Boesel | March-Ford | A | 1:15.724 | 1:13.968 | +4.428 |

=== Race ===
| Pos | No | Driver | Constructor | Tyre | Laps | Time/Retired | Grid | Points |
|---|---|---|---|---|---|---|---|---|
| 1 | 8 | (Austria) Niki Lauda | McLaren-Ford | MI | 76 | 1:35:33.812 | 5 | 9 |
| 2 | 28 | (France) Didier Pironi | Ferrari | G | 76 | + 25.726 | 4 | 6 |
| 3 | 27 | (France) Patrick Tambay | Ferrari | G | 76 | + 38.436 | 13 | 4 |
| 4 | 11 | (Italy) Elio de Angelis | Lotus-Ford | G | 76 | + 41.242 | 7 | 3 |
| 5 | 5 | (Republic of Ireland) Derek Daly | Williams-Ford | G | 76 | + 41.430 | 10 | 2 |
| 6 | 15 | (France) Alain Prost | Renault | MI | 76 | + 41.636 | 8 | 1 |
| 7 | 23 | (Italy) Bruno Giacomelli | Alfa Romeo | MI | 75 | + 1 Lap | 14 | |
| 8 | 4 | (United Kingdom) Brian Henton | Tyrrell-Ford | G | 75 | + 1 Lap | 17 | |
| 9 | 30 | (Italy) Mauro Baldi | Arrows-Ford | P | 74 | + 2 Laps | 26 | |
| 10 | 17 | (West Germany) Jochen Mass | March-Ford | A | 73 | + 3 Laps | 25 | |
| Ret | 22 | (Italy) Andrea de Cesaris | Alfa Romeo | MI | 66 | Electrical | 11 | |
| Ret | 25 | (United States) Eddie Cheever | Ligier-Matra | MI | 60 | Engine | 24 | |
| Ret | 29 | (Switzerland) Marc Surer | Arrows-Ford | P | 59 | Engine | 22 | |
| Ret | 6 | (Finland) Keke Rosberg | Williams-Ford | G | 50 | Fuel System | 1 | |
| Ret | 3 | (Italy) Michele Alboreto | Tyrrell-Ford | G | 44 | Engine | 9 | |
| Ret | 26 | (France) Jacques Laffite | Ligier-Matra | MI | 41 | Gearbox | 20 | |
| Ret | 35 | (United Kingdom) Derek Warwick | Toleman-Hart | P | 40 | Halfshaft | 16 | |
| Ret | 12 | (United Kingdom) Nigel Mansell | Lotus-Ford | G | 29 | Driver Injury | 23 | |
| Ret | 1 | (Brazil) Nelson Piquet | Brabham-BMW | G | 9 | Fuel System | 3 | |
| Ret | 14 | (Colombia) Roberto Guerrero | Ensign-Ford | MI | 3 | Engine | 19 | |
| Ret | 31 | (France) Jean-Pierre Jarier | Osella-Ford | P | 2 | Collision | 18 | |
| Ret | 20 | (Brazil) Chico Serra | Fittipaldi-Ford | P | 2 | Collision | 21 | |
| Ret | 7 | (United Kingdom) John Watson | McLaren-Ford | MI | 2 | Spun Off | 12 | |
| Ret | 2 | (Italy) Riccardo Patrese | Brabham-BMW | G | 0 | Collision | 2 | |
| Ret | 16 | (France) René Arnoux | Renault | MI | 0 | Collision | 6 | |
| Ret | 36 | (Italy) Teo Fabi | Toleman-Hart | P | 0 | Collision | 15 | |
| DNQ | 9 | (West Germany) Manfred Winkelhock | ATS-Ford | MI | | | | |
| DNQ | 33 | (Netherlands) Jan Lammers | Theodore-Ford | G | | | | |
| DNQ | 10 | (Chile) Eliseo Salazar | ATS-Ford | MI | | | | |
| DNQ | 18 | (Brazil) Raul Boesel | March-Ford | A | | | | |

== Notes ==
- This was the 1st pole position for a Finnish driver.
- This was the 25th Grand Prix win for an Austrian driver.
- This was the 100th Grand Prix start for Brazilian constructor Fittipaldi. In those 100 races, Fittipaldi achieved 3 podium finishes.
- This race marked the 5th British Grand Prix win for McLaren.

== Championship standings after the race ==
Drivers' Championship standings

| Pos | Driver | Points |
|---|---|---|
| 1 | (France) Didier Pironi | 35 |
| 2 | (United Kingdom) John Watson | 30 |
| 3 | (Austria) Niki Lauda | 24 |
| 4 | (Finland) Keke Rosberg | 21 |
| 5 | (France) Alain Prost | 19 |

Constructors' Championship standings

| Pos | Constructor | Points |
|---|---|---|
| 1 | (United Kingdom) McLaren-Ford | 54 |
| 2 | (Italy) Ferrari | 45 |
| 3 | (United Kingdom) Williams-Ford | 34 |
| 4 | (France) Renault | 23 |
| 5 | (United Kingdom) Lotus-Ford | 20 |

- Note: Only the top five positions are included for both sets of standings.

| Previous race: 1982 Dutch Grand Prix | FIA Formula One World Championship; 1982 season | Next race: 1982 French Grand Prix |
| Previous race: 1981 British Grand Prix | British Grand Prix | Next race: 1983 British Grand Prix; Next race at Brands Hatch: 1983 European Grand Prix |
Awards
| Preceded by 1981 Caesars Palace Grand Prix | Formula One Promotional Trophy for Race Promoter; 1982 | Succeeded by 1983 Italian Grand Prix |
