= 1982 Italian Grand Prix =

- Race 15 of 16 in the 1982 Formula One World Championship
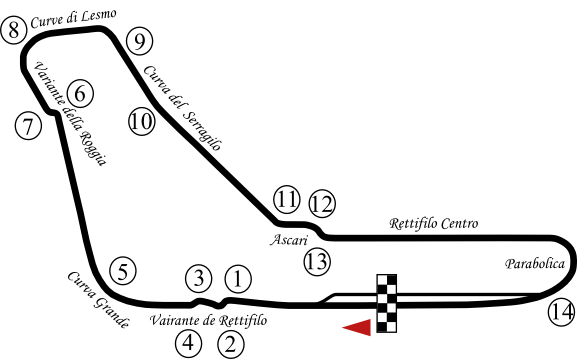

Race details
- Date: September 12, 1982
- Official name: LIII Gran Premio d'Italia
- Location: Autodromo Nazionale di Monza, Monza
- Course: Permanent racing facility
- Course length: 5.800 km (3.60 miles)
- Distance: 52 laps, 301.600 km (187.400 miles)
- Weather: Dry

Pole position
Driver	(United States) Mario Andretti	Ferrari
- Time: 1:28.472

Fastest lap
Driver	(France) René Arnoux	Renault
- Time: 1:33.619 on lap 25

Podium
First	(France) René Arnoux	Renault
Second	(France) Patrick Tambay	Ferrari
Third	(United States) Mario Andretti	Ferrari

The 1982 Italian Grand Prix was a Formula One motor race held at Monza on 12 September 1982. This was the final pole position, podium, finish, and points for 1978 World Champion Mario Andretti at this race. René Arnoux won the race. Arnoux announced he would be replacing Andretti at Ferrari in 1983. Arnoux finished ahead of Ferrari driver Patrick Tambay, and Mario Andretti in the second Ferrari finished third.

John Watson's fourth place put him 9 points behind Keke Rosberg (who finished outside the points after his rear wing came off and he had to pit in order for his team to replace it) with an outside chance of winning the Drivers' Title at the final race at Caesars Palace, where Ferrari, McLaren, and Renault would battle for the Constructors' Title. Both Brabham cars ran strongly early on but dropped out after several laps due to mechanical failures, a problem that would often compromise their otherwise fast package in 1982. Following their respective retirements during the race, Alain Prost and Niki Lauda were however mathematically eliminated from championship contention.

== Classification ==
=== Qualifying ===
Pos	No	Driver	Constructor	Q1	Q2	Gap
1	28	(United States) Mario Andretti	Ferrari	1:31.474	1:28.473	
2	1	(Brazil) Nelson Piquet	Brabham-BMW	1:29.709	1:28.508	+0.035
3	27	(France) Patrick Tambay	Ferrari	1:29.275	1:28.830	+0.357
4	2	(Italy) Riccardo Patrese	Brabham-BMW	1:30.818	1:29.898	+1.425
5	15	(France) Alain Prost	Renault	1:30.488	1:30.026	+1.553
6	16	(France) René Arnoux	Renault	1:30.520	1:30.097	+1.624
7	6	(Finland) Keke Rosberg	Williams-Ford	1:32.340	1:31.834	+3.361
8	23	(Italy) Bruno Giacomelli	Alfa Romeo	1:33.703	1:32.352	+3.879
9	22	(Italy) Andrea de Cesaris	Alfa Romeo	1:32.546	1:32.616	+4.073
10	8	(Austria) Niki Lauda	McLaren-Ford	1:33.571	1:32.782	+4.309
11	3	(Italy) Michele Alboreto	Tyrrell-Ford	1:33.553	1:33.134	+4.661
12	7	(United Kingdom) John Watson	McLaren-Ford	1:34.725	1:33.185	+4.712
13	5	(Republic of Ireland) Derek Daly	Williams-Ford	1:33.887	1:33.333	+4.860
14	25	(United States) Eddie Cheever	Ligier-Matra	1:34.357	1:33.377	+4.904
15	31	(France) Jean-Pierre Jarier	Osella-Ford	1:33.531	1:34.103	+5.058
16	35	(United Kingdom) Derek Warwick	Toleman-Hart	1:34.581	1:33.628	+5.155
17	11	(Italy) Elio de Angelis	Lotus-Ford	1:34.429	1:33.629	+5.156
18	14	(Colombia) Roberto Guerrero	Ensign-Ford	1:35.593	1:34.058	+5.585
19	29	(Switzerland) Marc Surer	Arrows-Ford	1:34.343	1:36.352	+5.870
20	4	(United Kingdom) Brian Henton	Tyrrell-Ford	1:35.640	1:34.379	+5.906
21	26	(France) Jacques Laffite	Ligier-Matra	1:34.659	no time	+6.186
22	36	(Italy) Teo Fabi	Toleman-Hart	1:37.693	1:34.780	+6.307
23	12	(United Kingdom) Nigel Mansell	Lotus-Ford	1:34.964	1:35.106	+6.491
24	30	(Italy) Mauro Baldi	Arrows-Ford	1:36.804	1:34.977	+6.504
25	10	(Chile) Eliseo Salazar	ATS-Ford	1:37.248	1:34.991	+6.518
26	20	(Brazil) Chico Serra	Fittipaldi-Ford	1:35.854	1:35.230	+6.757
27	17	(United Kingdom) Rupert Keegan	March-Ford	1:37.370	1:35.323	+6.850
28	9	(West Germany) Manfred Winkelhock	ATS-Ford	1:36.044	1:35.701	+7.228
29	18	(Brazil) Raul Boesel	March-Ford	1:36.811	1:35.747	+7.274
30	33	(Republic of Ireland) Tommy Byrne	Theodore-Ford	1:37.002	1:36.032	+7.559

=== Race ===
Pos	No	Driver	Constructor	Tyre	Laps	Time/Retired	Grid	Points
1	16	(France) René Arnoux	Renault	MI	52	1:22:25.734	6	9
2	27	(France) Patrick Tambay	Ferrari	G	52	+ 14.064	3	6
3	28	(United States) Mario Andretti	Ferrari	G	52	+ 48.452	1	4
4	7	(United Kingdom) John Watson	McLaren-Ford	MI	52	+ 1:27.845	12	3
5	3	(Italy) Michele Alboreto	Tyrrell-Ford	G	51	+ 1 Lap	11	2
6	25	(United States) Eddie Cheever	Ligier-Matra	MI	51	+ 1 Lap	14	1
7	12	(United Kingdom) Nigel Mansell	Lotus-Ford	G	51	+ 1 Lap	23	
8	6	(Finland) Keke Rosberg	Williams-Ford	G	50	+ 2 Laps	7	
9	10	(Chile) Eliseo Salazar	ATS-Ford	MI	50	+ 2 Laps	25	
10	22	(Italy) Andrea de Cesaris	Alfa Romeo	MI	50	+ 2 Laps	9	
11	20	(Brazil) Chico Serra	Fittipaldi-Ford	P	49	+ 3 Laps	26	
12	30	(Italy) Mauro Baldi	Arrows-Ford	P	49	+ 3 Laps	24	
NC	14	(Colombia) Roberto Guerrero	Ensign-Ford	MI	40	+ 12 Laps	18	
Ret	11	(Italy) Elio de Angelis	Lotus-Ford	G	33	Throttle	17	
Ret	23	(Italy) Bruno Giacomelli	Alfa Romeo	MI	32	Handling	8	
Ret	29	(Switzerland) Marc Surer	Arrows-Ford	P	28	Ignition	19	
Ret	15	(France) Alain Prost	Renault	MI	27	Injection	5	
Ret	8	(Austria) Niki Lauda	McLaren-Ford	MI	21	Brakes	10	
Ret	31	(France) Jean-Pierre Jarier	Osella-Ford	P	10	Wheel	15	
Ret	1	(Brazil) Nelson Piquet	Brabham-BMW	G	7	Engine	2	
Ret	2	(Italy) Riccardo Patrese	Brabham-BMW	G	6	Clutch	4	
Ret	26	(France) Jacques Laffite	Ligier-Matra	MI	5	Gearbox	21	
Ret	36	(Italy) Teo Fabi	Toleman-Hart	P	2	Engine	22	
Ret	5	(Republic of Ireland) Derek Daly	Williams-Ford	G	0	Collision	13	
Ret	35	(United Kingdom) Derek Warwick	Toleman-Hart	P	0	Collision	16	
Ret	4	(United Kingdom) Brian Henton	Tyrrell-Ford	G	0	Collision	20	
DNQ	17	(United Kingdom) Rupert Keegan	March-Ford	MI				
DNQ	9	(West Germany) Manfred Winkelhock	ATS-Ford	MI				
DNQ	18	(Brazil) Raul Boesel	March-Ford	MI				
DNQ	33	(Republic of Ireland) Tommy Byrne	Theodore-Ford	G				

== Notes ==
Last pole position for an American driver.

== Championship standings after the race ==
Drivers' Championship standings

Pos	Driver	Points
1	(Finland) Keke Rosberg	42
2	(France) Didier Pironi	39
3	(United Kingdom) John Watson	33
4	(France) Alain Prost	31
5	(Austria) Niki Lauda	30

Constructors' Championship standings

Pos	Constructor	Points
1	(Italy) Ferrari	74
2	(United Kingdom) McLaren-Ford	63
3	(France) Renault	59
4	(United Kingdom) Williams-Ford	55
5	(United Kingdom) Lotus-Ford	30

- Note: Only the top five positions are included for both sets of standings.

Previous race: 1982 Swiss Grand Prix	FIA Formula One World Championship; 1982 season	Next race: 1982 Caesars Palace Grand Prix
Previous race: 1981 Italian Grand Prix	Italian Grand Prix	Next race: 1983 Italian Grand Prix
