= Ferrari turbocharged V6 F1 engine =

Ferrari 1.5 V6 turbo
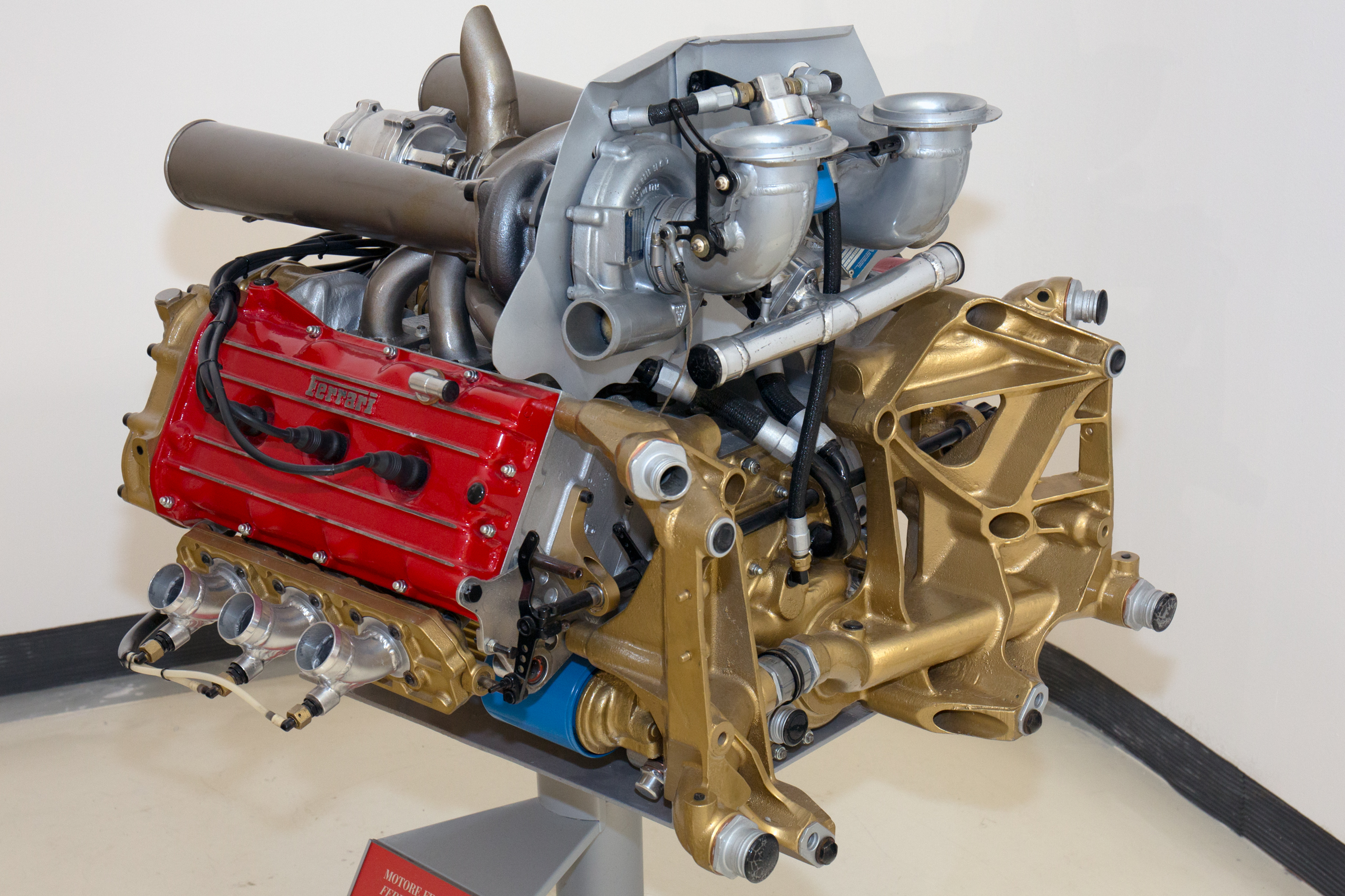
- 120° V6 Ferrari Tipo 021 (1981)

Overview
- Manufacturer: (Italy) Ferrari
- Production: 1981–1988

Layout
- Configuration: 1981–1986: 120° V6; 1987–1988: 90° V6
- Displacement: 1.5 L (1,496 cc)
- Cylinder bore: 81 mm (3.2 in)
- Piston stroke: 48.4 mm (1.9 in)
- Valvetrain: 24-valve, DOHC, four-valves per cylinder
- Compression ratio: 6.5:1

Combustion
- Turbocharger: KKK
- Fuel system: Direct fuel injection
- Fuel type: Gasoline
- Cooling system: Water-cooled

Output
- Power output: 540–1,200 hp (403–895 kW; 547–1,217 PS)
- Torque output: 246–548 lb⋅ft (334–743 N⋅m)

Dimensions
- Dry weight: 140 kg (308.6 lb)

Chronology
- Predecessor: Tipo 015 (1980)
- Successor: Tipo 035/5 (1989)

Ferrari made a series of turbocharged, 1.5-litre, V6 racing engines designed for Formula One; between 1981 and 1988. The engine was first used in the Ferrari 126C, in 1981.

== Tipo 021/1 (1981): Comprex vs. Turbo ==
The Ferrari 126C engine, dubbed the Tipo 021/1, was designed to replace the highly successful but obsolete flat-12 used in the 312T series in use since 1975. The V6 engine used forced induction, better suiting the ground effect aerodynamics now needed to be competitive (the previous car's wide flat-12 boxer engine obstructed the airflow necessary to generate efficient ground effect), and was a better package overall. During engine development Ferrari started experimenting with a Comprex pressure wave supercharger, supplied by a Swiss company; this car version was initially called 126BBC from the name of Brown Boveri Comprex and later named 126CX. The system was praised by drivers for driving like a naturally aspirated engine but having an extended power range, thus eliminating the notorious lag of the turbocharger. However the system was rather tall in the car and there could be some mixing of exhaust and intake gas so the team opted for the fitment of twin KKK turbochargers producing around 600 bhp (447 kW; 608 PS) in qualifying trim, detuned to 550 bhp (410 kW; 558 PS) in race trim. The car fitted with turbochargers was called 126CK.

Enzo Ferrari had hired Nicola Materazzi in December 1979 to work with Forghieri and Tomaini and specifically for his experience with the turbocharging in the Lancia Stratos Gr 5 Silhouette cars. He would bring technical know-how in the team to match the knowledge that Renault had built over time. Materazzi thus saw the advantages of the comprex system but also its difficulties and prepared also a second iteration with two smaller Comprex systems driven by hydraulic clutch instead of a belt but this was not used since the turbocharger was deemed simpler and worth pursuing. Hence Materazzi proceeded to perfect the following iterations of powertrain to obtain increased power and reliability.

The 126CK was first tested during the Italian Grand Prix in 1980. In testing it proved far faster than the 312T5 chassis the team was then using and Gilles Villeneuve preferred it, though he had reservations about the handling. Early unreliability of the turbo engine put paid to Villeneuve's 1981 championship hopes but he did score back to back victories in Monaco and Spain, as well as several podium places. Because of the problematic handling, the 126CK was at its best on fast tracks with long straights such as Hockenheim, Monza and Buenos Aires. The car proved to be very fast but Gilles Villeneuve found the handling to be very difficult, calling the car "a big red Cadillac".

The engine had massive turbo lag, followed by a steep power curve, and this upset the balance of the chassis. Although the Ferrari engine was the most powerful engine that year, even more so than the Renault.

== Tipo 021/2 (1982) ==
The arrival of Harvey Postlethwaite led to a total overhaul of the car in time for the 1982 season. The turbo engine was further developed and reliability was found. The 126C2 engine was further developed during the season, with new wings and bodywork tried, and the engine's power boosted to 650 bhp (485 kW; 659 PS) in qualifying trim and around 600 bhp (447 kW; 608 PS) in races.

== Tipo 021/3 (1983) ==
The 126C3's engine was first introduced for the British Grand Prix at Silverstone in 1983, with Patrick Tambay, while Arnoux would get to drive a 126C3 at the subsequent race in Germany at Hockenheim, which he ended up winning. Postlethwaite kept the oversized rear wing of the 126C2B, and over the season, Frenchmen Patrick Tambay and René Arnoux scored four wins between them and were both in contention for the world championship throughout 1983, but late unreliability cost them both. However, largely due to their main Constructors' rivals in 1983 (Brabham and Renault) having second drivers who had relatively poor seasons (Riccardo Patrese at Brabham and Eddie Cheever at Renault), Ferrari took the constructors' title for the second year in a row. Further compensation came from the engineers who boosted the power of the engine even further, to around 800 bhp (597 kW; 811 PS) in qualifying and over 650 bhp for racing, generally regarded as the best power figures produced in 1983.

== Tipo 031/1 (1984) ==
While the 126C4's engine was powerful at around 850 bhp (634 kW; 862 PS) in qualifying making it virtually the equal of the BMW and Renault engines (and giving it more power than McLaren had with their TAG-Porsche engines), the car itself produced little downforce compared to its main rivals with both new signing Michele Alboreto (the first Italian driver signed by Enzo Ferrari since 1973) and Arnoux claiming all season that the car lacked grip. This also had an effect on the cars' top speeds at circuits such as Kyalami, Hockenheim, and Monza as the cars were forced to run with as much wing as possible in order to have grip. This was shown in Round 2 in South Africa (Kyalami) where the Ferraris were some 25 km/h (16 mph) slower on the long straight than the BMW powered Brabhams, primarily due to the increased drag from high wing settings. The high wing settings also hurt fuel consumption during races with both drivers often having to drive slower than possible in order to finish races (re-fuelling was banned in 1984 and cars were restricted to just 220 litres per race).

Alboreto scored the engine's only victory in 1984, winning Round 3 in Belgium for what would prove to be the last F1 Grand Prix held at Zolder.

The 126C series cars won 10 races, took 10 pole positions and scored 260.5 points.

== Tipo 031/2 (1985) ==
The Ferrari Tipo 031/2 V6 turbo engine produced around 750 bhp (559 kW; 760 PS) in race trim during the 1985 season. Mounted on a new chassis, the 156/85, the exhaust systems were set outside of the vee, opposite to the previous year's 126C4. The turbocharger for each bank was located at the outside of the vee. Thus the intake chambers were located inside the vee.

The Tipo 031/2 engine proved to be fast and reliable in the early part of 1985 but as the season wore on, the Ferraris became increasingly fragile in both qualifying and race trim with numerous engine and turbo failures throughout the season. It was this unreliability that ultimately would cost Alboreto, who actually led the points standings for most of the season, the drivers' championship. Alboreto retired from four of the last five races in 1985 and retired but was classified as 13th due to completing 90% of the race in the other (Spa) allowing McLaren's Alain Prost to win his first championship. Although Alboreto suffered from end of season reliability issues which ultimately cost him and the team the respective Drivers' and Constructors' Championships, his new for 1985 team mate, Swede Stefan Johansson, did finish in 4 of the last 5 races that Alboreto did not.

== Tipo 032 (1986) ==
The power of the Tipo 032 made the F1/86 the most powerful car, racing or road, that Ferrari has ever produced. During qualifying for the French Grand Prix at the shortened Paul Ricard Circuit, Alboreto was able to use the engines reported 1,200 bhp (895 kW; 1,217 PS) (the engines were detuned to around 850 bhp (634 kW; 862 PS) for races) to blast past the Williams of Nigel Mansell on the long Mistral Straight. However, the car's handling problems became apparent in the corners following the straight with Mansell claiming they were driving much slower than he could have despite Alboreto being on a qualifying lap (Alboreto qualified six-tenths slower than Mansell). The F1/86 reportedly only handled well on the smoothest of circuits, such as Paul Ricard - the smoothest of all F1 circuits at the time, and even then as shown by practice, qualifying and the French GP itself, the car was still much slower than its rivals.

Visually, the F1/86 reminded of Ferrari's 1983 Constructors' Championship winning 126C3 with its bulky looking engine and fuel tank covering, though in reality it was somewhat lower than its championship winning ancestor.

== Tipo 033/033A (1987/1988) ==
This was an all-new 90° 1.5 litre turbocharged V6 engine called the Tipo 033 which replaced the old 120° V6 design which had been in use since 1981. Power for the new engine, which had to be fitted (as were all turbo engines) with the FIA's controversial pop-off valves which restricted turbo boost to 4.0 Bar, was rated at approximately 950 bhp (708 kW; 963 PS) for qualifying and 880–900 bhp (656–671 kW; 892–912 PS) for races.

After struggling with the F1/87 in the first half of the 1987 season, the team, and in particular its Austrian driver Gerhard Berger, came on strong in the second half of the season with 3 pole positions in Portugal, Japan and Australia, the last two of which Berger would also win giving Ferrari its first F1 win in over 2 years, then the longest streak without a Grand Prix win for the team.

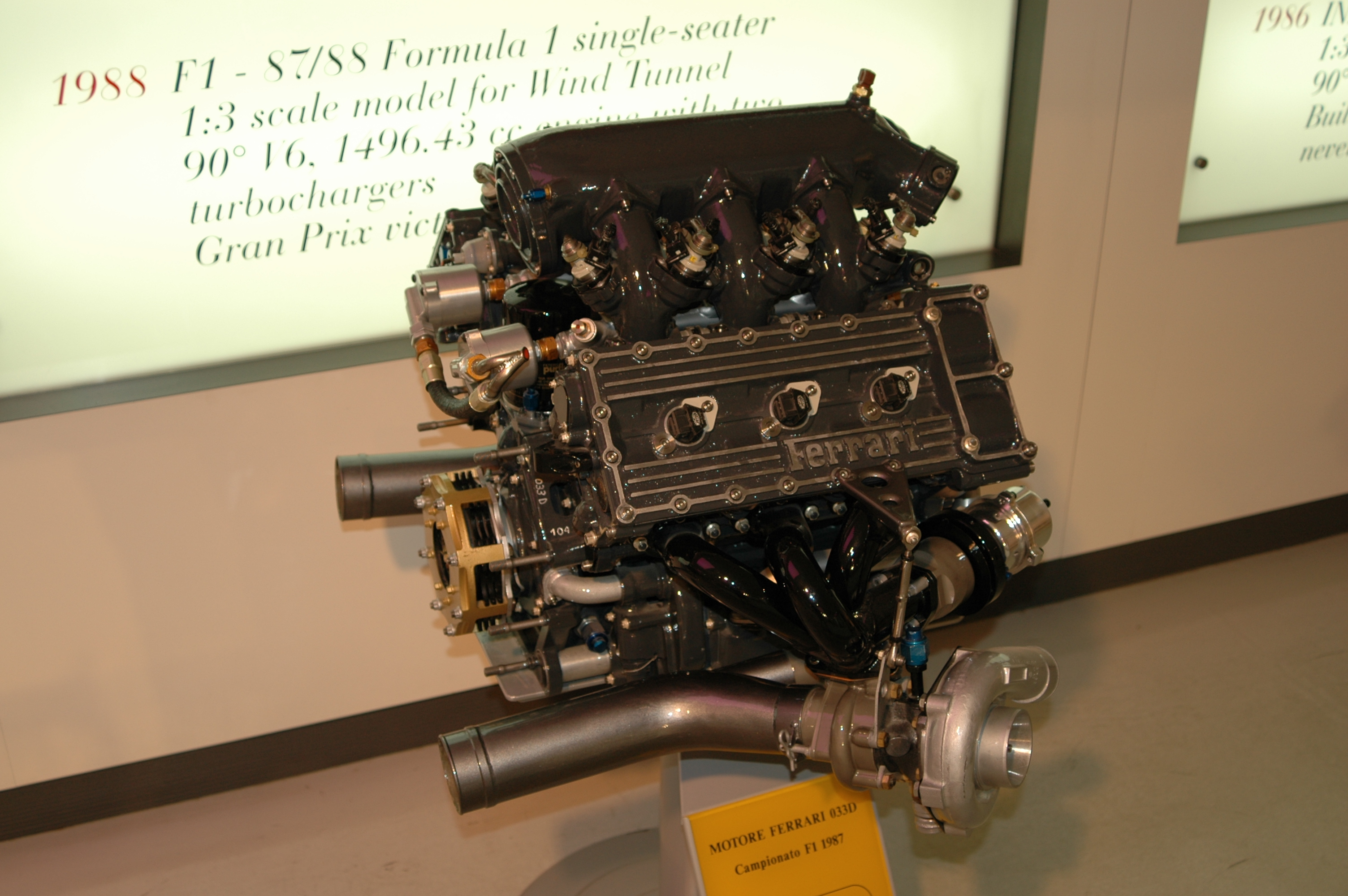
1987 Ferrari 033D engine

For 1988, the car was updated to conform to the new regulations and renamed the F1/87/88C. The car also featured new front and rear wings and a slightly lower engine cover due to the reduction in the fuel tank limit from 195 to 150 litres. The drivers Michele Alboreto (in his 5th and final season at Ferrari) and Gerhard Berger finished third and fifth in the driver's championship with Ferrari finishing second to McLaren in the Constructors Championship. The F1/87/88C scored one pole position at the British Grand Prix at Silverstone and one victory at the Italian Grand Prix in Monza.

Although it was one of the most powerful cars of the 1988 field at around 650–720 bhp (485–537 kW; 659–730 PS) at 12,000 rpm, the F1/87/88C's biggest problem was fuel consumption compared to the rival Honda engines used by McLaren. Unlike Honda who had built a completely new V6 engine to cope with both the reduced fuel limit of 150 litres and the lower turbo limit of 2.5 bar, Ferrari had only updated 1987's Tipo 033 V6 engine (dubbed Tipo 033A in 1988).

Early in the season, the team's Technical Director John Barnard had recommended to the team's engineers that to improve fuel consumption they reduce the Tipo 033A's rpm's by 1,000 and re-map the engine to compensate for the loss in power. Unfortunately, Barnard's relationship with the team was strained as he didn't work out of the factory in Maranello as was traditional (even fellow Englishman Harvey Postlethwaite had done so), but instead worked at Ferrari's Guilford Technical Office (a play on the Ferrari GTO name) he had set up in Guildford in England. Barnard did this not wanting to move his young family out of England to a very different social environment in Italy, and so as to be able to work away from the distractions of the factory (and reportedly to be away from the Ferrari loving Italian press who were also notoriously quick to condemn failures, of which there were many in the early days of his radical 1989 car). Reportedly, Barnard had the full backing to work out of England from none other than the Old Man himself, Enzo Ferrari. After joining the team in 1987, Barnard had also banned wine from the team's lunch table at both testing and races, a move which proved unpopular with Ferrari's mostly Italian mechanics. Consequently, his advice on the engine was ignored and the team continued to struggle on fuel consumption (this was despite Barnard's past history in developing the formidable TAG-Porsche engine formerly used by McLaren from 1983-1987 to win 3 Drivers' and 2 Constructors' championships). It was not until before the German Grand Prix that changes were made to the engines which happened to match Barnard's original suggestions. Predictably the result of the changes was better fuel economy without power loss, though the Ferrari V6 was still thirstier than the Honda's.

After taking pole at Silverstone, Berger put his achievement into perspective, stating that the ultra-fast circuit suited the Ferrari with its emphasis on outright top-end horsepower and not so much on acceleration. The Tipo 033A engine, while now having good top-end power, had from the start of the season suffered from poor throttle response and a lack of low-end power compared to Honda's engine. Early in the season the Tipo 033A had also suffered from a lack of top end power (with Ferrari embarrassingly slow at home at Imola in front of the tifosi), which was addressed before the Canadian Grand Prix with a revised plenum chamber putting them back on par in power with the all-conquering Honda turbos in the McLarens, though the thirst for fuel and throttle lag remained.

While using the F1/87 and 88C for the races during the 1987 and 1988 seasons, behind the scenes Ferrari was developing John Barnard's revolutionary 3.5-litre, 660 bhp (492 kW; 669 PS), normally-aspirated V12; which would make its debut in the 1989 season, when turbo-powered engines were banned from F1.

== Applications ==
- Ferrari 126C
- Ferrari 156/85
- Ferrari F1/86
- Ferrari F1/87
- Ferrari F1/87/88C
