= Ferrari F1/87 =

Formula One racing car

Ferrari F1/87 Ferrari F1/87/88C
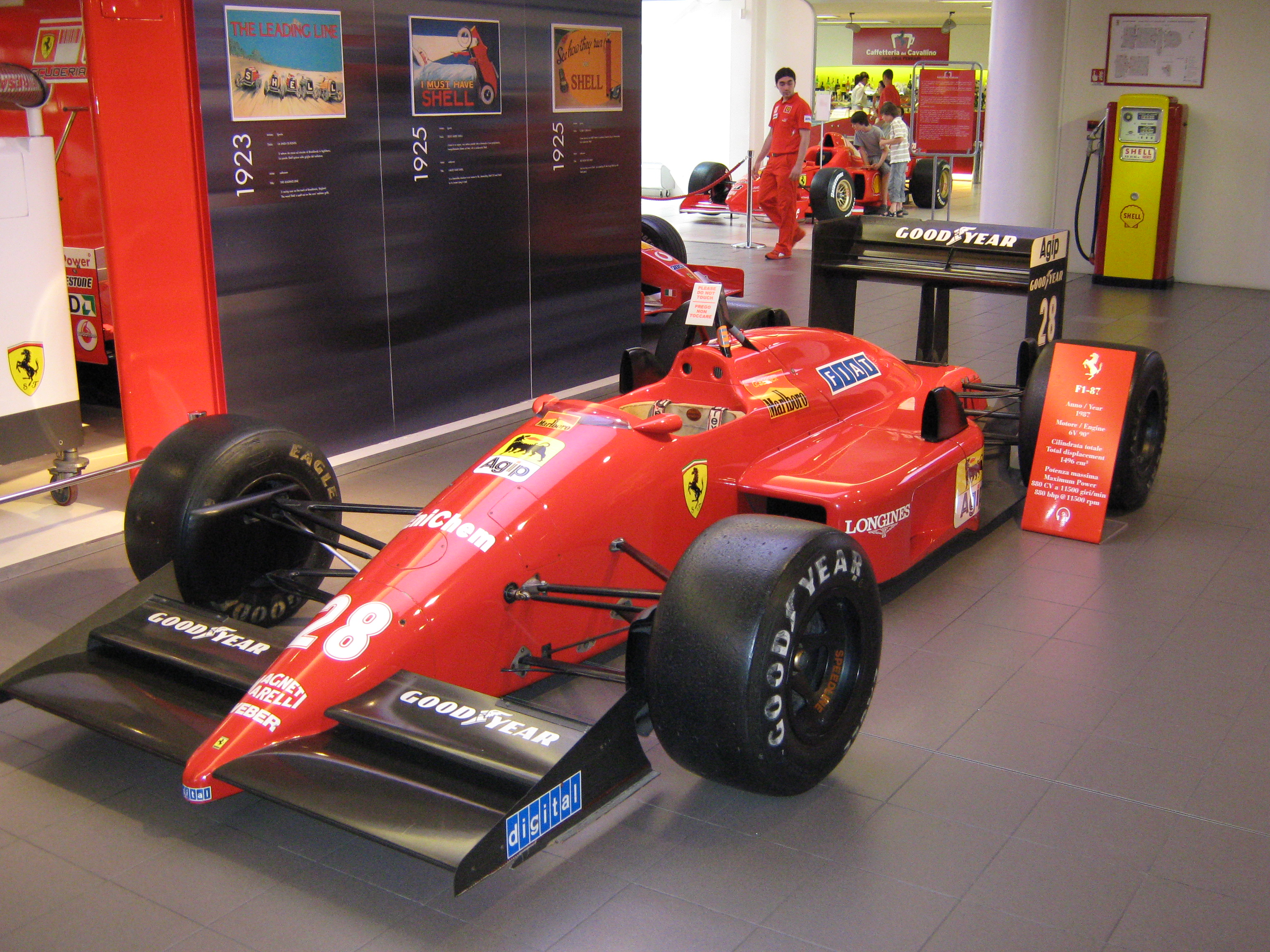
- Category: Formula One
- Constructor: Ferrari
- Designers: John Barnard (Technical Director); Gustav Brunner (Chief Designer); Jean-Jacques His (Chief Engine Designer)
- Predecessor: F1/86
- Successor: 640

Technical specifications
- Chassis: Kevlar and Carbon fibre composite monocoque
- Suspension (front): Double wishbones, pull-rod actuated coil springs over telescopic shock absorbers, anti-roll bar
- Suspension (rear): Double wishbones, pull-rod actuated coil springs over telescopic shock absorbers, anti-roll bar
- Axle track: 1987: Front: 1,796 mm (70.7 in); Rear: 1,668 mm (65.7 in); 1988: Front: 1,791 mm (70.5 in); Rear: 1,673 mm (65.9 in)
- Wheelbase: 2,800 mm (110 in)
- Engine: 1987: mid-engine, longitudinally -mounted, 1,496 cc (91.3 cu in), Ferrari Tipo 033, 90° V6, turbo, 4.0 bar turbo limited 1988: mid-engine, longitudinally-mounted, 1,496 cc (91.3 cu in), Ferrari Tipo 033A, 90° V6, turbo, 2.5 bar turbo limited
- Transmission: Ferrari 638, 6-speed, manual, Torsen
- Power: 880-950 hp @ 11,500 rpm (1987) 650-720 hp @ 12,000 rpm (1988)
- Weight: 1987: 540 kg (1,190 lb); 1988: 542 kg (1,195 lb)
- Fuel: Agip
- Tyres: Goodyear

Competition history
- Notable entrants: Scuderia Ferrari SpA SEFAC
- Notable drivers: 27. (Italy) Michele Alboreto; 28. (Austria) Gerhard Berger
- Debut: 1987 Brazilian Grand Prix
Races	Wins	Podiums	Poles	F/Laps
32	3	14	4	7

The Ferrari F1/87 is a Formula One racing car used by the Ferrari team during the 1987 Formula One season. The car was driven by Michele Alboreto (number 27) and Gerhard Berger (number 28) and replaced the Ferrari F1/86 used in 1986.

The F1/87/88C was the last Ferrari Formula One car with a turbocharged engine until the F14 T in 2014.

== F1/87 ==
Former ATS and RAM designer, Austrian Gustav Brunner, designed the all new Ferrari F1/87 with assistance from the team's new Technical Director, John Barnard, who had joined Ferrari after six highly successful years at McLaren where he was responsible for the McLaren MP4/2 and the turbocharged TAG-Porsche engine which had won the 1984, 1985 and 1986 Drivers' Championships and the 1984 and 1985 Constructors Championships. Barnard later stated that had he been in charge of designing the car from the start (design had started in 1986 while he was still at McLaren), that he would have come up with a different looking car. However, as he arrived after Brunner had already started design and construction Barnard could not change the design without considerable expense and loss of time.

The F1/87 was an all-new car and was much sleeker looking than its predecessor, the Harvey Postlethwaite designed F1/86, despite no reduction in fuel tank size for 1987. It featured a six-speed gearbox and an all-new 90° 1.5 litre turbocharged V6 engine called the Tipo 033 which replaced the old 120° V6 Tipo 032 which had been in use since 1981. Power for the new engine, which had to be fitted (as were all turbo engines) with the FIA's controversial pop-off valves which restricted turbo boost to 4.0 Bar, was rated at approximately 950 bhp (708 kW; 963 PS) for qualifying and 880 bhp (656 kW; 892 PS) for races.

The car was somewhat quick and competitive at the start of the season but suffered from persistent understeer, but by the time Germany came around a newly designed rear wing had been fitted and the car became even more competitive; it was almost as quick as the Williams-Honda but not as reliable; Gerhard Berger was qualifying inside the top 3 on every race in the season from the next race in Hungary afterwards. Berger scored two victories in the F1/87, the Japanese and Australian Grand Prix, as well as taking three pole positions. The car demonstrated flashes of its potential early in the season with Alboreto for a short time leading the San Marino Grand Prix. However, reliability issues were a major concern. From the Hungarian Grand Prix onwards, Ferrari looked to have a car that was as quick as any of their rivals. Berger challenged Mansell for the lead at the Hungarian Grand Prix before being forced to retire. The Austrian also nearly won the Portuguese Grand Prix before spinning and handing McLaren's Alain Prost his record 28th Grand Prix win (where Berger admitted it was a result of worrying too much about Prost who consequently stated that he believed that Alboreto would not have made the same mistake), and the Mexican Grand Prix which he was leading before reliability issues forced him out once again.

The season finished on a high with dominating victories for Berger in the final two rounds and Alboreto made it a Ferrari 1-2 in Adelaide after Ayrton Senna's Lotus-Honda was disqualified for oversized brake ducts. Berger's wins also gave Ferrari its first back to back wins since the late Gilles Villeneuve had won the Monaco and Spanish Grands Prix (Rounds 6 and 7) in 1981. As a result, Ferrari went into 1988 as one of the favourites for the championship.

== F1/87/88C ==
For 1988, the car was updated to conform to the new regulations and renamed the F1/87/88C. The car also featured new front and rear wings and a slightly lower engine cover due to the reduction in the fuel tank limit from 195 to 150 litres. The drivers Gerhard Berger and Michele Alboreto finished third and fifth in the driver's championship with Ferrari finishing second to McLaren in the Constructors Championship. The F1/87/88C scored one pole position at the British Grand Prix at Silverstone and one victory at the Italian Grand Prix in Monza.

Although it was one of the most powerful cars of the 1988 field at around 650–720 bhp (485–537 kW; 659–730 PS) @ 12,000 rpm, the F1/87/88C's biggest problem was fuel consumption compared to the rival Honda engines used by McLaren. Unlike Honda who had built a completely new V6 engine to cope with both the reduced fuel limit of 150 litres and the lower turbo limit of 2.5 bar, Ferrari had only updated 1987's Tipo 033 V6 engine (dubbed Tipo 033A in 1988).

This was clearly shown at the British GP. Pole sitter Berger led for the field together with McLaren's Ayrton Senna, building up a large cushion over the rest of the field before being forced to back off to conserve fuel (when Senna passed him on lap 14, Berger's fuel readout already showed him he would run out at least 5 laps before race end). While Senna went on to a comfortable win in very wet conditions Berger was forced to drive slower and slower, as evidenced when easily passed by the Benetton Ford V8 of Alessandro Nannini on the Hanger Straight. On the straight during qualifying, Berger had been timed at 195 mph (314 km/h), almost 10 mph (16 km/h) faster than the Benetton. Despite dropping turbo boost to its lowest possible setting, cutting back on engine revs and short shifting, Berger still ran out of fuel coming out of the Woodcote Chicane on the last lap. As a result, he fell from 6th to 9th, being passed by the Arrows-Megatron's of Derek Warwick and Eddie Cheever and the Williams-Judd of Riccardo Patrese in the space of about 400 metres. Alboreto, who had not been running at Berger's pace, had already run out of fuel 3 laps from the finish.

Both Berger and Alboreto being forced to back off because of fuel consumption problems were a feature of the team's 1988 season, although the problem seemed to have been righted to some extent before the team's surprise 1-2 at Monza.

Early in the season, the team's Technical Director John Barnard had recommended to the team's engineers that to improve fuel consumption they reduce the Tipo 033A's rpm's by 1,000 and re-map the engine to compensate for the loss in power. However, since the beginning of his time with Ferrari, Barnard's relationship with the team was strained as he did not work out of the factory in Maranello as was traditional, but instead worked at the Ferrari Technical Office he had set up in Guildford in England. Barnard did this not wanting to move his young family out of England to a very different social environment in Italy, and so as to be able to work away from the distractions of the factory (and reportedly to be away from the Italian press who were notoriously quick to condemn failures, of which there were many in the early days of his radical 1989 car). After joining the team in 1987 he had also banned wine from the team's lunch table at both testing and races, a move which proved unpopular with Ferrari's mostly Italian mechanics. Consequently, his advice on the engine was ignored and the team continued to struggle on fuel consumption (this was despite his past history in developing the TAG-Porsche engine which powered McLaren to 25 wins, 2 Constructors' titles and 3 Drivers' titles from 1983-86). It was not until before the German Grand Prix that changes were made to the engines which happened to match Barnard's original recommendations. Predictably the result of the changes was better fuel economy without power loss, though the Ferrari V6 was still thirstier than the Honda's.

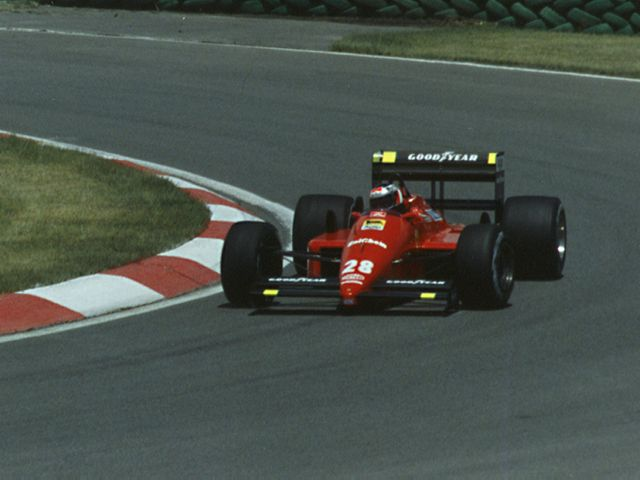
Gerhard Berger driving the F1/87/88C at the 1988 Canadian Grand Prix.

During the 1988 season, Berger's #28 Ferrari reportedly speed trapped the fastest of all 1988 cars when he was clocked at 328 km/h (204 mph) in practice for the German Grand Prix at the old Hockenheim circuit. This compared to the McLaren-Honda's recorded top speed of 320 km/h (199 mph) at the same meeting, though this is disputed as the BBC's Murray Walker stated during the race telecast that the McLarens actually trapped at 333 km/h (207 mph) in qualifying. The fastest recorded 'atmo' car was the Judd engined March 881 which recorded 312 km/h (194 mph). Early in the season both Berger and Alboreto had complained about the lack of top end power from their cars (they were backed up by speed trap figures), but a revised plenum chamber introduced for the Canadian Grand Prix improved this and from then the F1/87/88C's were often among the fastest cars in a straight line, though like their fuel consumption the Tipo 033A could not match the Honda V6 for acceleration.

After taking pole at Silverstone, Berger put his achievement into perspective, stating that the ultra-fast circuit suited the Ferrari with its emphasis on outright top end horsepower and not so much on acceleration. He correctly predicted that at Hockenheim the McLarens would be back on top, which proved correct despite the Ferrari's speed on the straights (in Germany, the circuit's Stadium section and the three chicanes breaking up the straights was where the Ferrari's lost some 1.5 seconds per lap to the McLarens). The Tipo 033A engine, while having good top end power, suffered from poor throttle response and a lack of low end power compared to the Honda's.

While using the F1/87 and 88C for the races during the 1987 and 1988 seasons, behind the scenes Ferrari were developing John Barnard's revolutionary 3.5 litre normally aspirated V12 semi-automatic Ferrari 640 which would make its debut in the 1989 season when turbo powered engines were banned from F1. Initially it was hoped that the V12 car would make its race debut in 1988, but continual problems with the semi-automatic gearbox that would haunt the team during the first half of 1989 (or more specifically, problems with the electrical system that controlled the unique 7 speed box) meant the team was forced to use the F1/87/88C for all of 1988. A modified version of the F1/87/88C was initially used as a test mule for the new V12 engine and semi-automatic gearbox until the Ferrari 639 test car, and later the 640, first appeared for testing late in 1988.

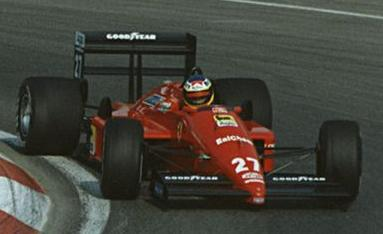
Michele Alboreto driving the F1/87/88C at the 1988 Canadian GP.

== Complete Formula One results ==
(key) (results shown in bold indicate pole position; results in italics indicate fastest lap)

Year	Entrant	Chassis	Engine	Tyres	Driver	1	2	3	4	5	6	7	8	9	10	11	12	13	14	15	16	Pts.	WCC
1987	Scuderia Ferrari SpA SEFAC	Ferrari F1/87	Ferrari Tipo 033; V6 tc	G		BRA	SMR	BEL	MON	DET	FRA	GBR	GER	HUN	AUT	ITA	POR	ESP	MEX	JPN	AUS	53	4th
1987	Scuderia Ferrari SpA SEFAC	Ferrari F1/87	Ferrari Tipo 033; V6 tc	G	Michele Alboreto	8	3	Ret	3	Ret	Ret	Ret	Ret	Ret	Ret	Ret	Ret	15†	Ret	4	2	53	4th
1987	Scuderia Ferrari SpA SEFAC	Ferrari F1/87	Ferrari Tipo 033; V6 tc	G	Gerhard Berger	4	Ret	Ret	4	4	Ret	Ret	Ret	Ret	Ret	4	**2**	Ret	Ret	**1**	**1**	53	4th
1988	Scuderia Ferrari SpA SEFAC	Ferrari F1/87/88C	Ferrari Tipo 033A; V6 tc	G		BRA	SMR	MON	MEX	CAN	DET	FRA	GBR	GER	HUN	BEL	ITA	POR	ESP	JPN	AUS	65	2nd
1988	Scuderia Ferrari SpA SEFAC	Ferrari F1/87/88C	Ferrari Tipo 033A; V6 tc	G	Michele Alboreto	5	18†	3	4	Ret	Ret	3	17†	4	Ret	Ret	2	5	Ret	11	Ret	65	2nd
1988	Scuderia Ferrari SpA SEFAC	Ferrari F1/87/88C	Ferrari Tipo 033A; V6 tc	G	Gerhard Berger	2	5	2	3	Ret	Ret	4	**9**	3	4	Ret	1	Ret	6	4	Ret	65	2nd

† Driver did not finish the race, but was still classified as they completed at least 90% of the race distance.
