= Ferrari F1/86 =

1986 Formula One racing car by Ferrari

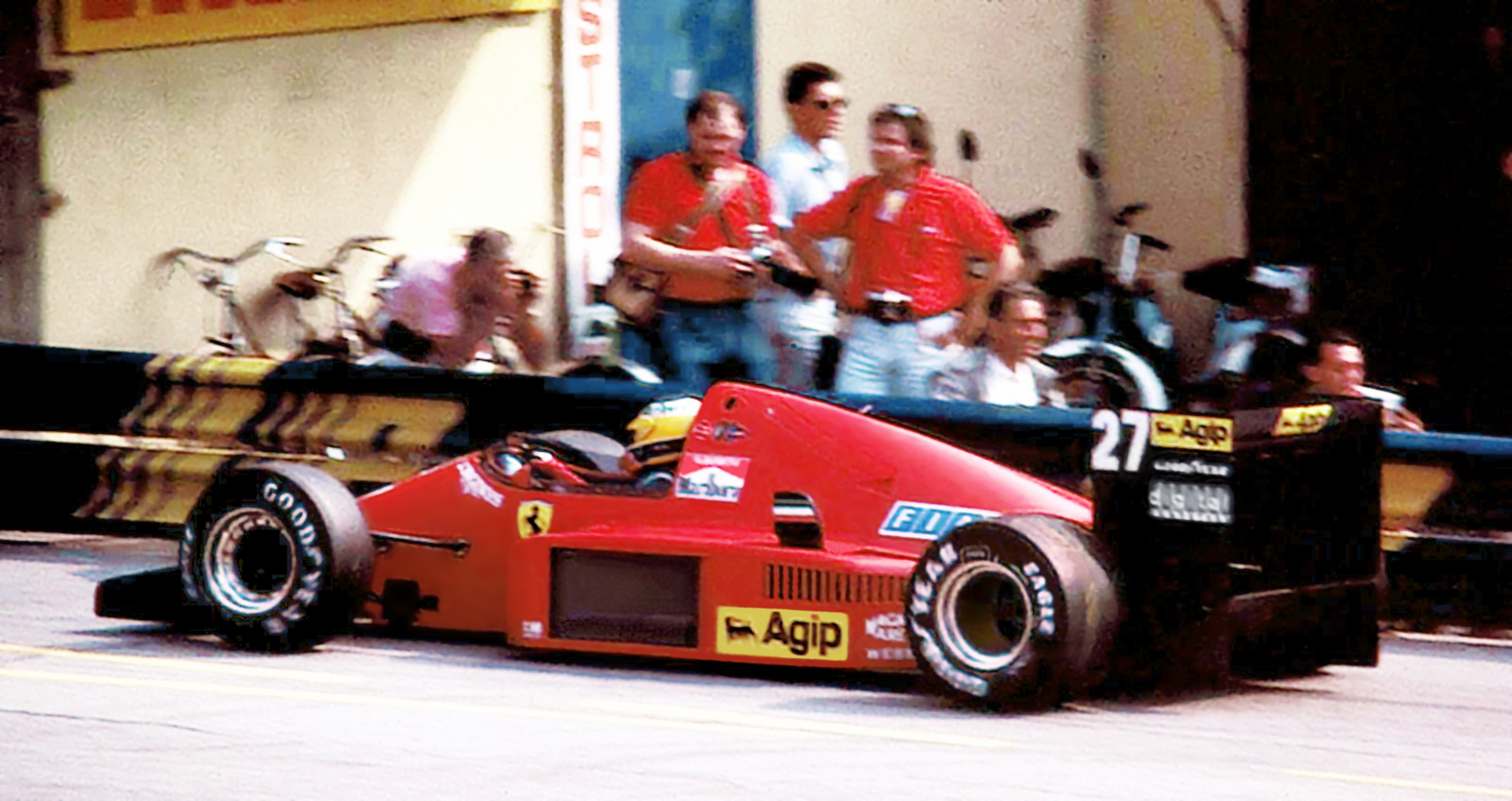
- Category: Formula One
- Constructor: Scuderia Ferrari
- Designers: Harvey Postlethwaite (Technical Director); Jean-Claude Migeot (Chief Designer); Jean Jacques His (Chief Engine and Transmission Designer)
- Predecessor: 156/85
- Successor: F1/87

Technical specifications
- Chassis: Carbon fibre and Aluminium honeycomb composite monocoque structure
- Suspension (front): Double wishbone, inboard spring / damper
- Suspension (rear): Double wishbone suspension
- Axle track: Front: 1,807 mm (71 in); Rear: 1,663 mm (65 in)
- Wheelbase: 2,766 mm (109 in)
- Engine: Ferrari Tipo 032, 1,496 cc (91.3 cu in), 120° V6, turbo, mid-engine, longitudinally-mounted
- Transmission: Ferrari Type 635 5-speed manual
- Power: 850 hp (633.8 kW) @ 12,000 rpm (race-spec), 1,250 hp (932.1 kW)+ @ 12,000 rpm (qualifying trim)
- Weight: 548 kg (1,208.1 lb)
- Fuel: Agip
- Tyres: Goodyear

Competition history
- Notable entrants: Scuderia Ferrari SpA SEFAC
- Notable drivers: 27. (Italy) Michele Alboreto; 28. (Sweden) Stefan Johansson
- Debut: 1986 Brazilian Grand Prix
Races	Wins	Podiums	Poles	F/Laps
16	0	5	0	0

The Ferrari F1/86 was the car with which Scuderia Ferrari competed in the 1986 Formula One World Championship. The car was designed by Harvey Postlethwaite, who had also designed its predecessor, the 156/85. It was driven by Italian Michele Alboreto and Swede Stefan Johansson. The car was very uncompetitive, despite the engine being regarded as one of the strongest on the grid. It was replaced by the Ferrari F1/87 for 1987.

== Development and race history ==
The Ferrari F1/86 was designed as a replacement for the 156/85 used in 1985, which initially proved to be competitive, but as the season developed had increasing reliability issues as well as lagging behind in the power race. The chassis and the overall design of the 1986 car was very similar to the 1985 model. The main concerns were in refining the aerodynamics and improving reliability.

Although it was among the fastest cars in a straight line in the 1986 season, often bettered only by the BMW powered cars, the F1/86 performed far worse than its predecessor: the reliability problems were all but eliminated, but it was constantly outpaced by the faster Williams-Hondas, McLaren-TAGs, Lotus-Renaults and Benetton-BMWs. The car gained 5 podiums during the year, 4 from Stefan Johansson and 1 from Michele Alboreto, and failed to score a single win, pole position or fastest lap.

Powered by the last of Ferrari's 120° turbocharged V6 engines, the Tipo 032, the F1/86 is the most powerful car, for racing or road, that Ferrari has ever produced. During qualifying for the French Grand Prix at the shortened Paul Ricard Circuit, Alboreto was able to use the engine's reported 1,250 bhp (932 kW; 1,267 PS) and more (the engines were detuned to around 850 bhp (634 kW; 862 PS) for races) to blast past the Williams of Nigel Mansell on the long Mistral Straight. However, the car's handling problems became apparent in the corners following the straight with Mansell claiming they were driving much slower than he could have despite Alboreto being on a qualifying lap (Alboreto qualified six-tenths slower than Mansell). The F1/86 reportedly only handled well on the smoothest of circuits, such as Paul Ricard - the smoothest of all F1 circuits at the time.

Visually, the F1/86 was bulky looking compared to its rivals and reminded many of the 126C3 used in 1983, though in reality it was actually smaller and lower. The car did manage to lead one lap of the entire 1986 season at the Belgian Grand Prix when Johansson inherited the lead from Mansell, who had made an early pit stop for new tyres (Johansson finished 3rd in front of team leader Alboreto despite being told via the radio to stay behind the Italian). The F1/86 looked to be at its most competitive during the Italian Grand Prix where Alboreto was keeping pressure on the Williams' of Nigel Mansell and Nelson Piquet, before a spin exiting the Variante del Rettifilo chicane. Alboreto had already overtaken Keke Rosberg (McLaren), René Arnoux (Ligier-Renault) and Gerhard Berger (Benetton) and looked on course to compete for victory.

At the Italian Grand Prix, Michele Alboreto was a no-show for Friday practice and qualifying with two stories doing the rounds, that he had either slipped and fell in the shower or he'd fallen off his motorbike. So during morning practice only, Johansson was given an eye opener when he was allowed a few laps of the fast Monza Circuit in Alboreto's qualifying car. The eye opener for the Swede was that he found his team mates car to be considerably more powerful than his own.

Ferrari recruited English designer John Barnard, then technical director at McLaren, towards the latter stages of the season in an attempt to regain ground on their rivals from 1987 onwards. The chassis was replaced by the Gustav Brunner designed F1/87 model for the 1987 season. 1986 was also the last year for Ferraris 120° V6 turbo used by the team since 1981. For 1987 the team introduced an all new 90° V6 turbo dubbed the Tipo 033.

== Complete Formula One results ==
(key)

Year	Entrant	Engine	Tyres	Driver	1	2	3	4	5	6	7	8	9	10	11	12	13	14	15	16	Pts.	WCC
1986	Scuderia Ferrari SpA SEFAC	Ferrari Tipo 032; V6 tc	G		BRA	ESP	SMR	MON	BEL	CAN	DET	FRA	GBR	GER	HUN	AUT	ITA	POR	MEX	AUS	37	4th
1986	Scuderia Ferrari SpA SEFAC	Ferrari Tipo 032; V6 tc	G	Michele Alboreto	Ret	Ret	10†	Ret	4	8	4	8	Ret	Ret	Ret	2	Ret	5	Ret	Ret	37	4th
1986	Scuderia Ferrari SpA SEFAC	Ferrari Tipo 032; V6 tc	G	Stefan Johansson	Ret	Ret	4	10	3	Ret	Ret	Ret	Ret	11†	4	3	3	6	12†	3	37	4th

† Did not finish, but was classified as he had completed more than 90% of the race distance.
