= 1985 Brazilian Grand Prix =

1st round of the 1985 Formula One season

Coordinates: 15°46′19.502″S 47°54′1.115″W

- Race 1 of 16 in the 1985 Formula One World Championship
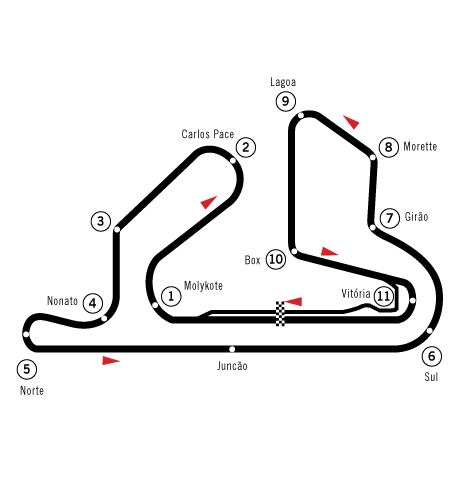

Race details
- Date: April 7, 1985
- Official name: XIV Grande Prêmio do Brasil
- Location: Jacarepaguá Circuit; Jacarepaguá, Rio de Janeiro
- Course: Permanent racing facility
- Course length: 5.031 km (3.126 miles)
- Distance: 61 laps, 306.891 km (190.693 miles)
- Weather: Dry, 34 °C (93 °F) air temperature

Pole position
Driver	(Italy) Michele Alboreto	Ferrari
- Time: 1:27.768

Fastest lap
Driver	(France) Alain Prost	McLaren-TAG
- Time: 1:36.702 on lap 34

Podium
First	(France) Alain Prost	McLaren-TAG
Second	(Italy) Michele Alboreto	Ferrari
Third	(Italy) Elio de Angelis	Lotus-Renault

The 1985 Brazilian Grand Prix (officially known as the XIV Grande Prêmio do Brasil) was a Formula One motor race held at Jacarepaguá in Jacarepaguá, Rio de Janeiro on 7 April 1985. It was the first round of the 1985 Formula One World Championship, and marked the 13th edition of the Brazilian Grand Prix as a round of the World Championship since its inception in 1950.

Alain Prost, driving for McLaren was the defending race winner heading into the race. In qualifying, Ferrari driver, Michele Alboreto took pole, his second of his career. In the race, he would finish second on the podium behind eventual race winner, Prost, while Elio de Angelis rounded out the podium in the Lotus car. Of note, even though René Arnoux finished 4th for Ferrari, he was sacked after the race, with both the team and Arnoux never revealing the reason behind the sacking. The driver who finished 7th in this race, Stefan Johansson, was picked up by the Scuderia for the rest of the year. This race was also Nigel Mansell's first race of seven seasons with the Williams team.

== Background ==
The 1985 Formula One season saw an entry list of 28 drivers competing, with Zakspeed officially joining Formula One with Jonathan Palmer as their driver, though they wouldn't be competing in the opening round as they were going to join the field in Portugal. Zakspeed competed only in the European races that season for financial reasons. The other brand new team that was competing in the 1985 season was Minardi, who had competed in Formula Two from 1980 to 1984 with a custom chassis before stepping up and competing in F1.

The Toleman team, meanwhile, missed the race due to being unable to secure a tyre contract. Unfortunately for the team, Goodyear refused to supply them with tyres after the manner in which team boss Alex Hawkridge had switched from Goodyear's to Pirelli's in their Formula 2 days, while Pirelli also refused to supply their tyres to the team after it had broken their contract in 1984 to go with Michelin instead. With the French company pulling out of Formula One, this left Toleman without any tyres. Their lead driver, Stefan Johansson was present however and substituted for Stefan Bellof when the German driver was suspended by his Tyrrell team due to a contract dispute.

The opening round in Brazil was the first round of the 1985 championship, this was the 14th edition of the Brazilian Grand Prix since its inception in 1972. It was also the 13th time that a Formula One World Championship had been held there with the 1972 edition being a non-championship race. The race was held at the Jacarepaguá circuit which held its first Grand Prix in 1978 and would host the Brazilian GP from 1981 to 1989.

== Qualifying ==
Qualifying for the 1985 Brazilian Grand Prix was held in two sessions with the first on the Friday and the second one on the Saturday. In the Friday session, Lotus who did some aerodynamic tweaks to their Renault powered car, similar to the Lola's new CART Indycar, went to the top of the timesheets on Friday morning. But Elio de Angelis wouldn't be able to improve on his time with the driver responding after the second qualifying session, "I am sure I could have retained the pole." Senna would improve on his lap time but only slightly as he finished behind de Angelis on the grid in fourth.

On the front row of the grid, Michele Alboreto would claim the first pole position of the season with a time of 1:27.768, a full one second ahead of his time on the Friday and 6/10ths faster than the 1984 pole time set by Elio de Angelis. Alboreto's teammate in Rene Arnoux also improve his time by a second, but the Frenchman had to start the race in seventh place, using the spare car after the Ferrari engine was down on power on his main car. Also on the front row of the grid was Keke Rosberg in the Williams-Honda who earlier in the weekend had a blown turbo from their engine on the Saturday morning. But one flying lap secured Rosberg a front row start with teammate Nigel Mansell starting from fifth.

McLaren also has engine issues with the TAG-Porsche turbos. The TAG engines were known not to be able to take higher qualifying boost like the BMW, Renault and Honda engines. But in qualifying, try as they may, McLaren just couldn't get the TAG's to run properly at high boost with both Alain Prost and reigning World Champion Niki Lauda struggling to 6th and 9th places respectively. Eighth on the grid was the first of the Pirelli's with Brabham-BMW driver, Nelson Piquet being the quickest. Brabham's long-time Chief Designer and Technical Director Gordon Murray advised that their winter testing had been for the best race tyre and not for taking any pole positions in the first few races of the season (Piquet had taken 9 poles in 1984, but had only finished 7 races). Rounding out the top ten was Renault driver, Derek Warwick who was 2.3 seconds off the pace. His team-mate, Patrick Tambay who started behind him in 11th advised that Renault RE60 was "four seconds behind the pace when we first tested the car here a month ago. Now it had been reduced to two seconds."

=== Qualifying classification ===
Pos	No	Driver	Constructor	Q1	Q2	Gap
1	27	(Italy) Michele Alboreto	Ferrari	1:28.899	1:27.768	—
2	6	(Finland) Keke Rosberg	Williams-Honda	1:32.135	1:27.864	+0.096
3	11	(Italy) Elio de Angelis	Lotus-Renault	1:28.081		+0.313
4	12	(Brazil) Ayrton Senna	Lotus-Renault	1:28.705	1:28.389	+0.621
5	5	(United Kingdom) Nigel Mansell	Williams-Honda	1:31.211	1:28.848	+1.080
6	2	(France) Alain Prost	McLaren-TAG	1:30.253	1:29.117	+1.349
7	28	(France) René Arnoux	Ferrari	1:30.813	1:29.612	+1.844
8	7	(Brazil) Nelson Piquet	Brabham-BMW	1:31.364	1:29.855	+2.087
9	1	(Austria) Niki Lauda	McLaren-TAG	1:30.716	1:29.984	+2.216
10	16	(United Kingdom) Derek Warwick	Renault	1:31.533	1:30.100	+2.332
11	15	(France) Patrick Tambay	Renault	1:30.254	1:30.516	+2.486
12	18	(Belgium) Thierry Boutsen	Arrows-BMW	1:32.207	1:30.593	+2.825
13	25	(Italy) Andrea de Cesaris	Ligier-Renault	1:33.718	1:31.411	+3.643
14	22	(Italy) Riccardo Patrese	Alfa Romeo	1:32.107	1:31.790	+4.022
15	26	(France) Jacques Laffite	Ligier-Renault	1:37.803	1:32.021	+4.253
16	9	(West Germany) Manfred Winkelhock	RAM-Hart	1:36.239	1:32.560	+4.792
17	8	(France) François Hesnault	Brabham-BMW	1:34.742	1:32.904	+5.136
18	23	(United States) Eddie Cheever	Alfa Romeo	1:33.094	1:33.091	+5.323
19	17	(Austria) Gerhard Berger	Arrows-BMW	1:34.919	1:34.773	+7.005
20	10	(France) Philippe Alliot	RAM-Hart	1:35.726	1:37.409	+7.958
21	3	(United Kingdom) Martin Brundle	Tyrrell-Ford	1:36.225	1:36.152	+8.384
22	24	(Italy) Piercarlo Ghinzani	Osella-Alfa Romeo	1:38.272	1:36.743	+8.975
23	4	(Sweden) Stefan Johansson	Tyrrell-Ford	1:37.799	1:37.293	+9.525
24	21	(Italy) Mauro Baldi	Spirit-Hart	1:41.330		+13.562
25	29	(Italy) Pierluigi Martini	Minardi-Ford	1:44.046		+16.278

== Race ==
The race temperature for the race was a 34 °C (93 °F) degree day as the driver's had line-up. Before the race, Prost finished fastest in the warm-up session ahead of Alboreto and Lauda rounding out the top three. When the race began, the front row made a perfect start with Rosberg just edging out Alboreto into the first corner with the other Williams car in Mansell also getting off to a great start. He would get behind Alboreto before a bump on the rear wheel would see him go to the outside of the turn and off the racing line. This incident would end his race a few laps later with body damage issues.

This race marked the 17th Grand Prix won by Alain Prost, moving him ahead of Stirling Moss as the Formula 1 driver with most race wins among those without a Drivers' Championship. Four more wins would follow throughout the year and Prost would extend the record to 21, at which point he clinched his first title and handed the record back to Moss.

=== Race classification ===
Pos	No	Driver	Constructor	Laps	Time/Retired	Grid	Points
1	2	(France) Alain Prost	McLaren-TAG	61	1:41:26.115	6	9
2	27	(Italy) Michele Alboreto	Ferrari	61	+ 3.259	1	6
3	11	(Italy) Elio de Angelis	Lotus-Renault	60	+ 1 Lap	3	4
4	28	(France) René Arnoux	Ferrari	59	+ 2 Laps	7	3
5	15	(France) Patrick Tambay	Renault	59	+ 2 Laps	11	2
6	26	(France) Jacques Laffite	Ligier-Renault	59	+ 2 Laps	15	1
7	4	(Sweden) Stefan Johansson	Tyrrell-Ford	58	+ 3 Laps	23	
8	3	(United Kingdom) Martin Brundle	Tyrrell-Ford	58	+ 3 Laps	21	
9	10	(France) Philippe Alliot	RAM-Hart	58	+ 3 Laps	20	
10	16	(United Kingdom) Derek Warwick	Renault	57	+ 4 Laps	10	
11	18	(Belgium) Thierry Boutsen	Arrows-BMW	57	+ 4 Laps	12	
12	24	(Italy) Piercarlo Ghinzani	Osella-Alfa Romeo	57	+ 4 Laps	22	
13	9	(West Germany) Manfred Winkelhock	RAM-Hart	57	+ 4 Laps	16	
Ret	17	(Austria) Gerhard Berger	Arrows-BMW	51	Suspension	19	
Ret	12	(Brazil) Ayrton Senna	Lotus-Renault	48	Electrical	4	
Ret	23	(United States) Eddie Cheever	Alfa Romeo	42	Engine	18	
Ret	29	(Italy) Pierluigi Martini	Minardi-Ford	41	Engine	25	
Ret	1	(Austria) Niki Lauda	McLaren-TAG	27	Fuel System	9	
Ret	25	(Italy) Andrea de Cesaris	Ligier-Renault	26	Accident	13	
Ret	22	(Italy) Riccardo Patrese	Alfa Romeo	20	Puncture	14	
Ret	6	(Finland) Keke Rosberg	Williams-Honda	10	Turbo	2	
Ret	8	(France) François Hesnault	Brabham-BMW	9	Accident	17	
Ret	5	(United Kingdom) Nigel Mansell	Williams-Honda	8	Exhaust	5	
Ret	21	(Italy) Mauro Baldi	Spirit-Hart	7	Turbo	24	
Ret	7	(Brazil) Nelson Piquet	Brabham-BMW	2	Transmission	8	

== Championship standings after the race ==
Drivers' Championship standings

Pos	Driver	Points
1	(France) Alain Prost	9
2	(Italy) Michele Alboreto	6
3	(Italy) Elio de Angelis	4
4	(France) René Arnoux	3
5	(France) Patrick Tambay	2

Constructors' Championship standings

Pos	Constructor	Points
1	(United Kingdom) McLaren-TAG	9
2	(Italy) Ferrari	9
3	(United Kingdom) Lotus-Renault	4
4	(France) Renault	2
5	(France) Ligier-Renault	1

- Note: Only the top five positions are included for both sets of standings.

Previous race: 1984 Portuguese Grand Prix	FIA Formula One World Championship; 1985 season	Next race: 1985 Portuguese Grand Prix
Previous race: 1984 Brazilian Grand Prix	Brazilian Grand Prix	Next race: 1986 Brazilian Grand Prix
