= Ferrari 156/85 =

1985 Formula One racing car by Ferrari

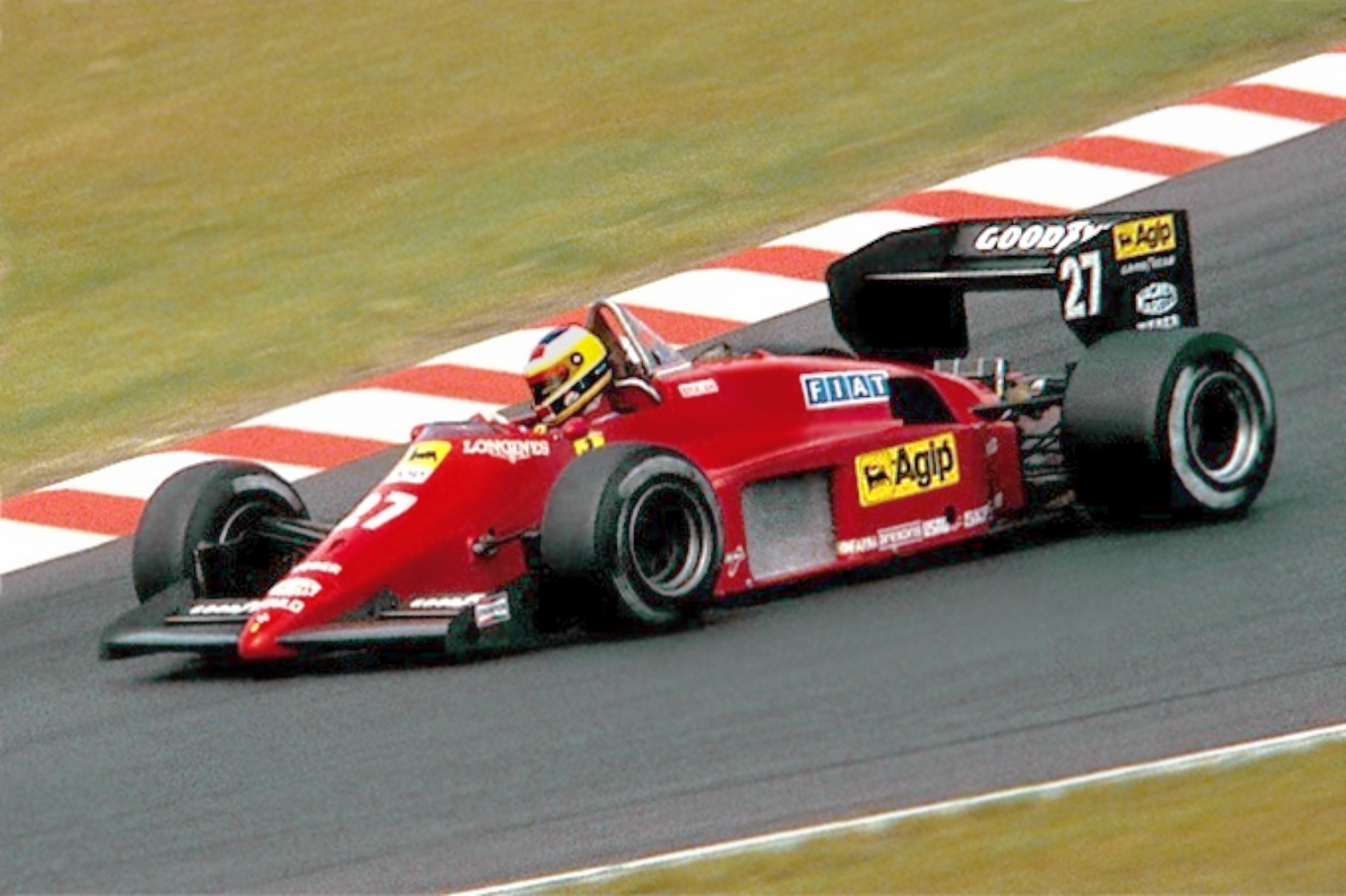
- Category: Formula One
- Constructor: Scuderia Ferrari
- Designers: Harvey Postlethwaite (Technical Director); Jean-Claude Migeot (Chief Designer); Ildo Renzetti (Chief Engine Designer)
- Predecessor: 126C4
- Successor: F1/86

Technical specifications
- Chassis: Kevlar and Carbon fibre composite monocoque
- Suspension (front): Double wishbones, pull-rod actuated coil springs over telescopic shock absorbers, anti-roll bar
- Suspension (rear): Double wishbones, pull-rod actuated coil springs over telescopic shock absorbers, anti-roll bar
- Axle track: Front: 1,797 mm (71 in); Rear: 1,664 mm (66 in)
- Wheelbase: 2,762 mm (109 in)
- Engine: Ferrari Tipo 031/2, 1,496 cc (91.3 cu in), 120° V6, turbo, mid-engine, longitudinally-mounted
- Transmission: Ferrari Type 635 5-speed manual
- Power: 750 hp (559.3 kW) @ 12,000 rpm
- Weight: 558 kg (1,230.2 lb)
- Fuel: Agip
- Tyres: Goodyear

Competition history
- Notable entrants: Scuderia Ferrari SpA SEFAC
- Notable drivers: 27. (Italy) Michele Alboreto; 28. (France) René Arnoux; 28. (Sweden) Stefan Johansson
- Debut: 1985 Brazilian Grand Prix
Races	Wins	Podiums	Poles	F/Laps
16	2	10	1	2

The Ferrari 156/85 was a Formula One car designed by Mauro Forghieri and Harvey Postlethwaite for use by Scuderia Ferrari in the 1985 Formula One World Championship. The number 27 car was driven by Italian Michele Alboreto, while the number 28 car was driven at the first race of the season in Brazil by Frenchman René Arnoux, who then fell out with Enzo Ferrari and was replaced for the rest of the year by Swede Stefan Johansson.

== Overview ==
=== Name ===
The 156/85 was named after the following designations: 15 for the 1.5L displacement and 6 for the turbocharged V6 engine while /85 suffix refers to the year of competition and to differentiate to the other cars. The name 156 also refers to the 156 F1, which was raced and took their first Constructors' Championship in 1961, evoking the legacy of their heritage of success.

=== Engine ===
The Ferrari Tipo 031/2 V6 turbo engine produced around 750 bhp (559 kW; 760 PS) during the 1985 season. The exhaust systems were set outside of the vee, opposite to the previous year's 126C4. The turbocharger for each bank was located at the outside of the vee. Thus the intake chambers were located inside the vee.

== Racing history ==
The 156/85 proved to be fast and reliable in the early part of 1985 but as the season wore on, the Ferraris became increasingly fragile in both qualifying and race trim with numerous engine and turbo failures throughout the season. It was this unreliability that ultimately would cost Alboreto, who actually led the points standings for most of the season, the drivers' championship. Alboreto retired from four of the last five races in 1985 and retired but was classified as 13th due to completing 90% of the race in the other (Monza) allowing McLaren's Alain Prost to win his first championship.

The 156/85 proved to be fast in a straight line and had excellent mechanical grip - the car was competitive at Monaco and Alboreto managed to finish second after a number of issues outside his control during the race. But from the Dutch Grand Prix onwards the 156/85's performance and reliability dropped off alarmingly, with Alboreto and Johansson qualifying in the lower mid-field instead of near the front as they regularly did before. The turbochargers on the engine began to develop problems that Ferrari were not able to solve and as a result the engine's power output had badly decreased. Alboreto drove half a lap of the Brands Hatch circuit on lap 13 of the European Grand Prix with the rear of his car on fire following another turbo failure. He drove the car into the pits and straight to his Ferrari pit, many observers seeing this as his way of showing that the Ferrari's unreliability had cost him the World Championship, which Prost won by finishing fourth in that race. While Alboreto had unreliability, his teammate Johansson finished fifth twice and fourth once with only two retirements in the last five races. The 156/85's unreliability also allowed McLaren to overtake them in the points after half of the season, leaving Ferrari as runners up.

== Complete Formula One results ==
(key) (Results in bold indicate pole position; results in italics indicate fastest lap)

Year	Team	Engine	Tyres	Drivers	1	2	3	4	5	6	7	8	9	10	11	12	13	14	15	16	Points	WCC
1985	Scuderia Ferrari	Ferrari Tipo 031/2; V6 tc	**G**		BRA	POR	SMR	MON	CAN	DET	FRA	GBR	GER	AUT	NED	ITA	BEL	EUR	RSA	AUS	**82**	**2nd**
1985	Scuderia Ferrari	Ferrari Tipo 031/2; V6 tc	**G**	(Italy) Michele Alboreto	**2**	2	Ret	2	1	3	Ret	2	1	3	4	13†	Ret	Ret	Ret	Ret	**82**	**2nd**
1985	Scuderia Ferrari	Ferrari Tipo 031/2; V6 tc	**G**	(France) René Arnoux	4																**82**	**2nd**
1985	Scuderia Ferrari	Ferrari Tipo 031/2; V6 tc	**G**	(Sweden) Stefan Johansson		8	6†	Ret	2	2	4	Ret	9	4	Ret	5	Ret	Ret	4	5	**82**	**2nd**

† Did not finish, but was classified as he had completed more than 90% of the race distance.

== External list ==
- YouTube video showing Alboreto at Brands Hatch
