= Ferrari 126C =

1981-1984 Formula One racing car by Ferrari

Ferrari 126C Ferrari 126CK Ferrari 126C2 Ferrari 126C2B Ferrari 126C3 Ferrari 126C4
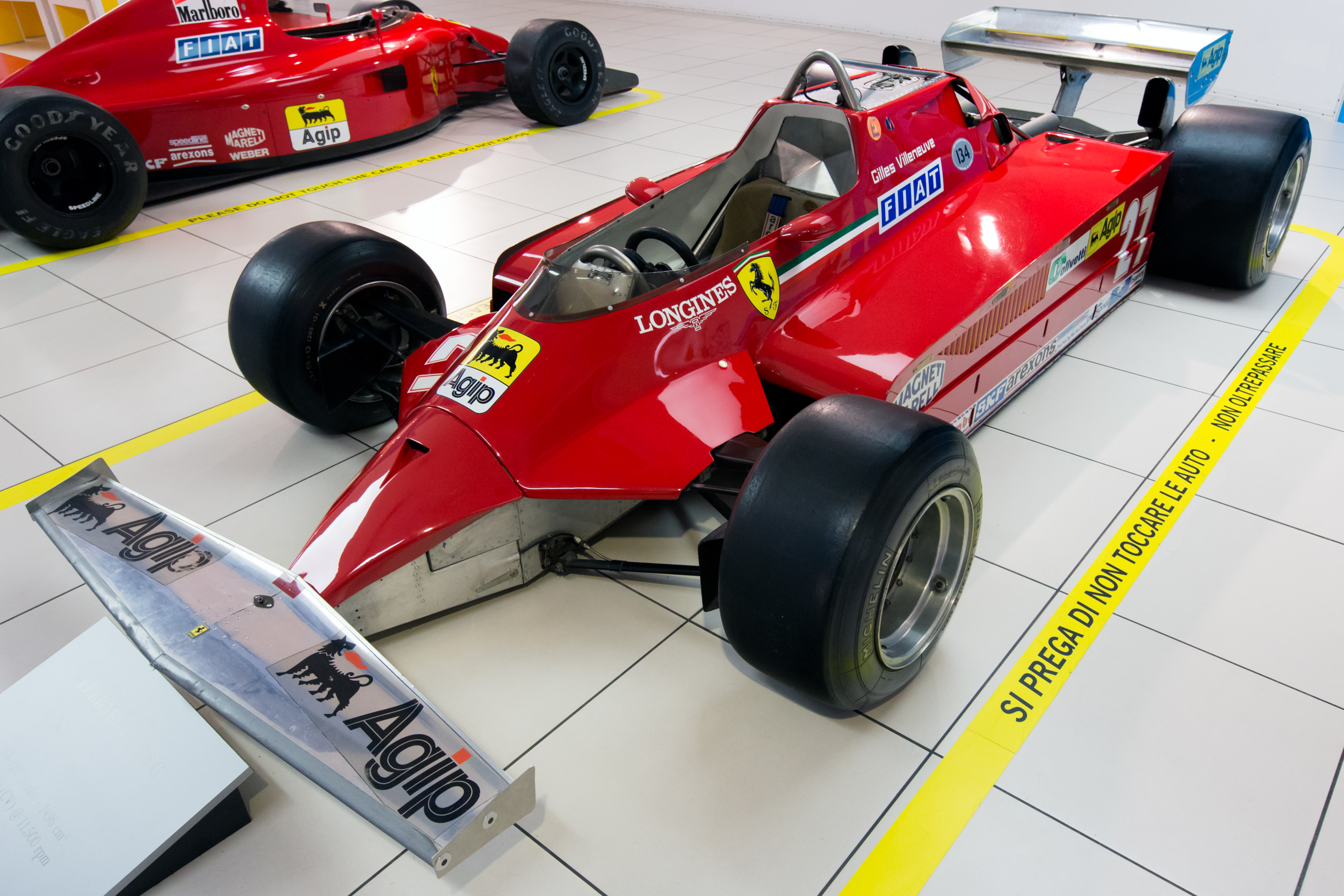
- 1981 Ferrari 126CK
- Category: Formula One
- Constructor: Scuderia Ferrari
- Designers: Mauro Forghieri (Technical Director, Chief Engine Designer); Antonio Tomaini (Chief Designer, CK); Harvey Postlethwaite (Chief Designer, C2-C4)
- Predecessor: 312T5
- Successor: 156/85

Technical specifications
- Chassis: Carbon fiber and aluminium honeycomb composite monocoque
- Suspension (front): Double wishbone, inboard spring / damper
- Suspension (rear): Double wishbone suspension
- Engine: Ferrari 021 / 031, 1,496 cc (91.3 cu in), 120° V6, turbo, Mid-engine, longitudinally-mounted
- Transmission: Ferrari 6-speed longitudinal or transverse Ferrari gearbox manual
- Power: 560–680 hp (417.6–507.1 kW) @ 11,500 rpm
- Fuel: Agip
- Tyres: 1981: Michelin; 1982-84: Goodyear

Competition history
- Notable entrants: Scuderia Ferrari SpA SEFAC
- Notable drivers: 27. (Canada) Gilles Villeneuve; 27. (France) Patrick Tambay; 27. (Italy) Michele Alboreto; 28. (France) Didier Pironi; 28. (United States) Mario Andretti; 28. (France) René Arnoux
- Debut: 1981 United States Grand Prix West (CK); 1982 South African Grand Prix (C2); 1983 Brazilian Grand Prix (C2B); 1983 British Grand Prix (C3); 1984 Brazilian Grand Prix (C4)
Races	Wins	Podiums	Poles	F/Laps
62	10	34	10	12
- Constructors' Championships: 2 (1982, 1983)
- Drivers' Championships: 0
- Unless otherwise stated, all data refer to Formula One World Championship Grands Prix only.

1984 Ferrari 126C4/M2
Ferrari 126C4/M2 at Goodwood Festival of Speed 2009

The Ferrari 126C is the car with which Ferrari raced from the 1981 through the 1984 Formula One season. The team's first attempt at a turbocharged Formula 1 car, it was designed by Mauro Forghieri and Harvey Postlethwaite. The engine chief engineer was Nicola Materazzi.

== Development and race history ==
=== 126C (1981): Comprex vs turbo ===
The Ferrari 126C was designed to replace the highly successful but obsolete 312T series in use since 1975. The basic chassis was almost identical to the previous car but the smaller and narrower V6 engine with forced induction, better suiting the ground effect aerodynamics now needed to be competitive (the previous car's wide 180° V12 engine obstructed the airflow necessary to generate efficient ground effect), and was a better package overall. During engine development Ferrari started experimenting with a Comprex pressure wave supercharger, supplied by a Swiss company; this car version was initially called 126BBC from the name of Brown Boveri Comprex and later named 126CX. The system was praised by drivers for driving like a naturally aspirated engine but having an extended power range, thus eliminating the notorious lag of the turbocharger. However the system was rather tall in the car and there could be some mixing of exhaust and intake gas so the team opted for the fitment of twin KKK turbochargers producing around 600 bhp (447 kW; 608 PS) in qualifying trim, detuned to 550 bhp (410 kW; 558 PS) in race trim. The car fitted with turbochargers was called 126CK.

Enzo Ferrari had hired Nicola Materazzi in December 1979 to work with Forghieri and Tomaini and specifically for his experience with the turbocharging in the Lancia Stratos Gr 5 Silhouette cars. He would bring technical know-how in the team to match the knowledge that Renault had built over time. Materazzi thus saw the advantages of the comprex system but also its difficulties and prepared also a second iteration with two smaller Comprex systems driven by hydraulic clutch instead of a belt but this was not used since the turbocharger was deemed simpler and worth pursuing. Hence Materazzi proceeded to perfect the following iterations of powertrain to obtain increased power and reliability.

The 126CK was first tested during the Italian Grand Prix in 1980. In testing it proved far faster than the 312T5 chassis the team were then using and Gilles Villeneuve preferred it, though he had reservations about the handling. Early unreliability of the turbo engine put paid to Villeneuve's 1981 championship hopes but he did score back to back victories in Monaco and Spain, as well as several podium places. Because of the problematic handling the 126CK was at its best on fast tracks with long straights such as Hockenheim, Monza and Buenos Aires. The car proved to be very fast but Gilles Villeneuve found the handling to be very difficult, calling the car "a big red Cadillac".

According to Villeneuve's teammate Didier Pironi and English engineer Harvey Postlethwaite, who arrived at Ferrari well into the 1981 season, it was not the mechanical aspects of the chassis that was the main cause of the car's handling problems, but in fact it was the aerodynamics of the car. Postlethwaite later said that the 126CK "had a quarter of the downforce that the Williams or Brabham had that year". The poor aerodynamics of the car, coupled to the chassis' hard suspension (all teams in 1981 were running with hard suspensions to increase aerodynamic efficiency), created a tendency to make the car slide into corners before the ground effect pulled the car back on to the track. This had the undesired effects of exposing the drivers to even larger g-forces than the Williams FW07 or Brabham BT49 and making the car tend to overuse its tyres. The engine had massive turbo lag, followed by a steep power curve, and this upset the balance of the chassis. Although the Ferrari engine was the most powerful engine that year, even more so than the Renault - the combination of a severe lack of downforce and an abruptly powerful engine made the car an annoying menace to race against. At the Österreichring one gaggle of 6 naturally aspirated, better handling cars formed behind Didier Pironi for a number of laps, followed by three other cars shortly afterwards: none of them, however, could find their way past easily due to the Ferrari's power advantage on the very fast Austrian circuit, even though the car was very clearly slower going through the Austrian circuit's fast, sweeping corners. It took a very brave and successful overtaking manoeuvre by the eventual winner Jacques Laffite in a Ligier to pass Pironi at the first of the Panorama Curves after being held up for many laps, and then the 5 others also soon passed Pironi. The same thing also happened at Jarama that year; 4 cars were stuck behind Villeneuve on the tight and twisty circuit, but he was able to hold off the cars behind him thanks to the car's power advantage and fair mechanical grip. Monaco and (less so) Jarama were slow circuits where aerodynamic downforce was not as important as mechanical grip, so combined with Villeneuve's famed ability behind the wheel the car was able to perform better than expected at these two races.

=== 126C2 (1982) ===
The arrival of Harvey Postlethwaite led to a total overhaul of the car in time for the 1982 season. The turbo engine was further developed and reliability found, while an all-new chassis, suspension and bodywork were designed, featuring Ferrari's first genuine full monocoque chassis with honeycomb aluminum panels for the structure, which made it more similar to its British specialist competitors' cars than any of Ferrari's previous F1 cars had been since 1962. Smaller, nimbler and with vastly improved aerodynamics, the 126C2 handled far better than its predecessor, although due to its heavier weight thanks to the turbo-charged engine made it slower around corners than its rivals. Villeneuve and Pironi posted record times in testing with the new car and began the season with several solid results, even though Pironi had a gigantic accident during testing at the Paul Ricard circuit, of which he was lucky to escape alive. The car made its debut at South Africa in January of that year, where both cars retired and at the Long Beach Grand Prix in America 2 1/2 months later, the car was fitted with an unusual configuration of two thin rear wings, each individually as wide as the regulations allowed, but placed side-by-side and staggered fore and aft, making it effectively a single double-wide wing. This was done as a deliberate exploitation of rule loopholes in retaliation for Williams' "water-cooled brakes" exploit at the previous race in Brazil, and to send a political message to the governing body, which was part of the FISA–FOCA wars, which resulted in disqualification for Villeneuve, who finished the race in 3rd. Then came the infamous race at San Marino after which Villeneuve accused Pironi of having disobeyed team orders. The fallout from the race preceded Villeneuve's death in an horrific accident during qualifying at the next round in Belgium, which left Pironi as team leader. Ferrari did not enter a second car for the next three races, before ultimately drafting in Patrick Tambay to replace Villeneuve. He managed three podium finishes, including a win in Germany, en route to a fifth place in the championship despite only having driven half the season. Pironi himself was nearly killed in Germany in a similar accident as Villeneuve's, putting an end to his motor racing career. Again they did not enter a second car for two races, before bringing in Mario Andretti as Pironi's replacement. The American finished on the podium alongside his teammate in Ferrari's home race. Despite the turbulent season, Ferrari won the constructors' championship that year. The 126C2 was further developed during the season, with new wings and bodywork tried, and the engine's power boosted to 650 bhp (485 kW; 659 PS) in qualifying trim and around 600 bhp (447 kW; 608 PS) in races. An improved chassis was designed and developed mid-season that was introduced for the French Grand Prix that changed the rocker arm front suspension to a more streamlined pull-rod, rising rate suspension. A thinner longitudinal gearbox was also designed and developed to replace the transverse gearbox to promote better undisturbed airflow from the underside of the ground-effects chassis's side-pods.

==== 126C2B (1983) ====
Mandatory flat bottoms for the cars were introduced for 1983, reducing ground effect, and a redesigned "B" spec. version of the 126C2 was introduced with this in mind. This car was built and raced for the first half of the 1983 season. Postlethwaite designed an oversized but effective rear wing that recovered around 50% of the lost downforce, whilst further compensation came from the engineers who boosted the power of the engine even further, to around 800 bhp (597 kW; 811 PS) in qualifying and over 650 bhp for racing, generally regarded as the best power figures produced in 1983.

=== 126C3 (1983) ===
The 126C3 was first introduced for the British Grand Prix at Silverstone in 1983, with Patrick Tambay, while Arnoux would get to drive a 126C3 at the subsequent race in Germany at Hockenheim, which he ended up winning. Postlethwaite kept the oversized rear wing of the 126C2B, and over the season, Frenchmen Patrick Tambay and René Arnoux scored four wins between them and were both in contention for the world championship throughout 1983, but late unreliability cost them both. However, Ferrari took the constructors' title for the second year in a row.

=== 126C4 (1984) ===
In the 1984 season McLaren introduced their extremely successful MP4/2 car, which was far more effective than the 126C4 and dominated the year. The 126C4 won only once in 1984 at the Belgian Grand Prix at Zolder where Villeneuve had been killed in 1982, driven by Italian Michele Alboreto who won his first race for the team. Alboreto also scored the team's only pole position of the season at Zolder. Ferrari ultimately finished as runner up in the constructors' championship, some 86 points behind the dominant McLarens and 10 points clear of the Lotus-Renaults.

While the 126C4's engine was powerful at around 850 bhp (634 kW; 862 PS) in qualifying making it virtually the equal of the BMW, Renault and Honda turbo engines (and more power than McLaren had with their TAG-Porsche engines), the car itself produced little downforce compared to its main rivals with both Alboreto and Arnoux claiming all season that the car lacked grip. This also had an effect on the cars' top speeds at circuits such as Kyalami, Hockenheim and Monza as the cars were forced to run with as much wing as possible in order to have grip. This was shown in Round 2 in South Africa (Kyalami) where the Ferraris were some 25 km/h (16 mph) slower on the long straight than the BMW powered Brabhams, primarily due to the increased drag from high wing settings. The high wing settings also hurt fuel consumption during races with both drivers often having to drive slower than possible in order to finish races (re-fuelling was banned in 1984 and cars were restricted to just 220 litres per race).

The 126C series cars won 10 races, took 10 pole positions and scored 260.5 points.

== Gallery ==
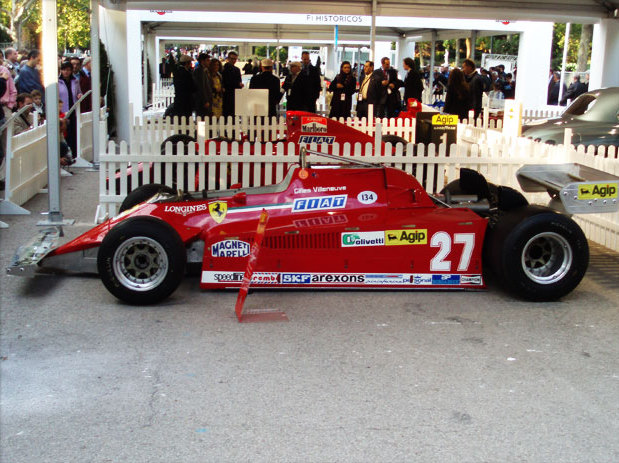
126CK, pictured in 2008

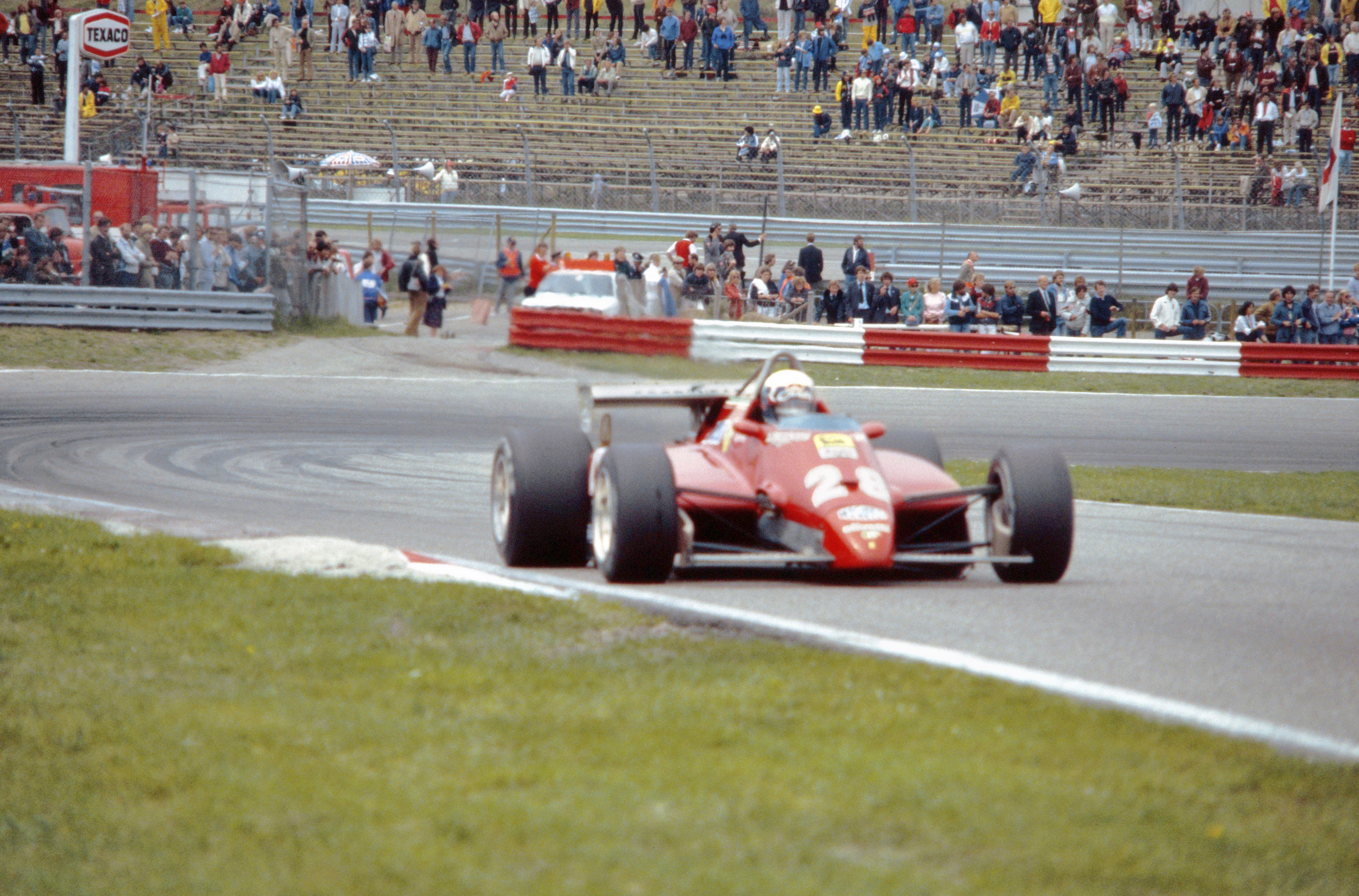
Didier Pironi (1952–1987) driving a 126C2 at the 1982 Dutch Grand Prix

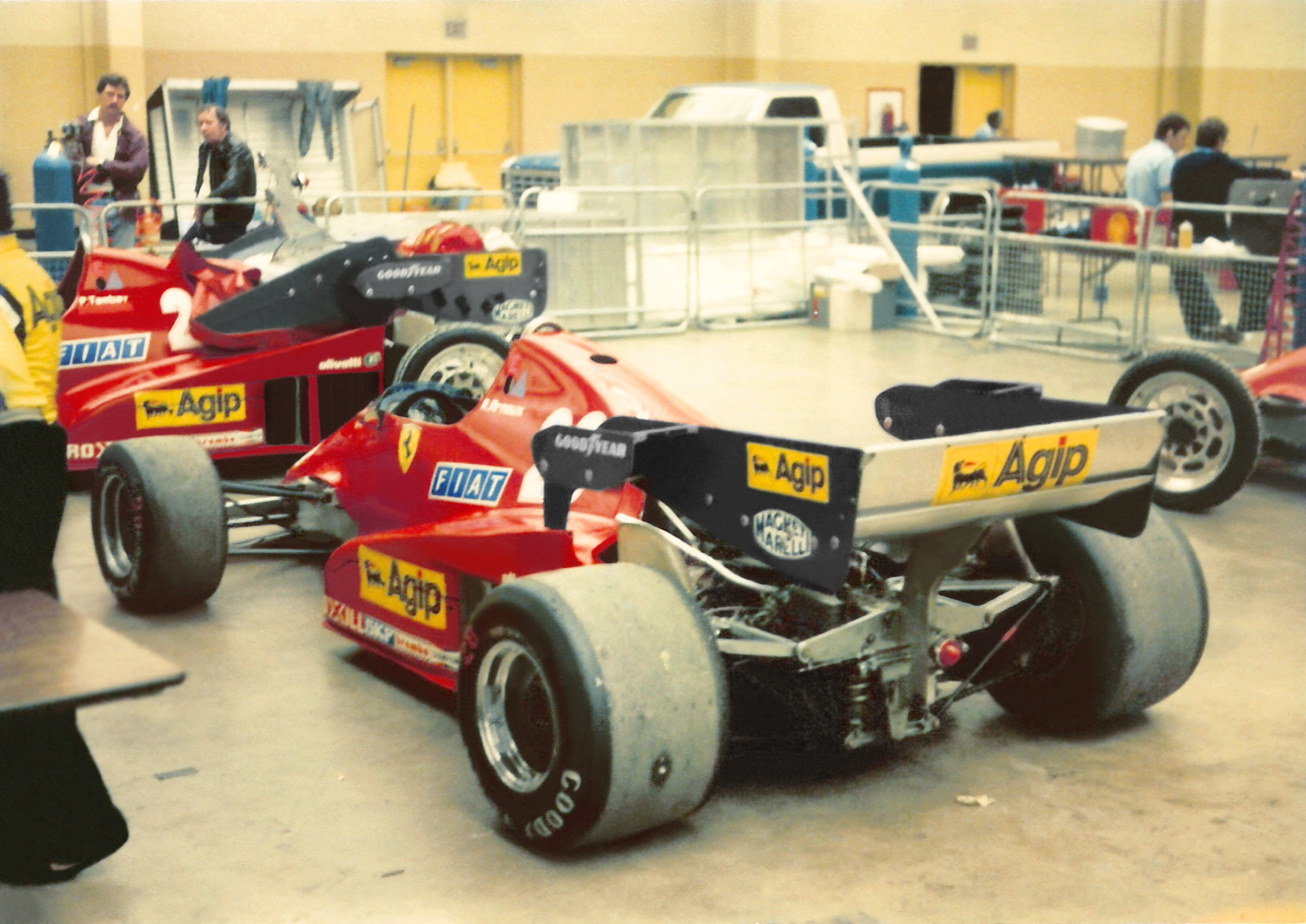
126C2B at the 1983 Detroit Grand Prix

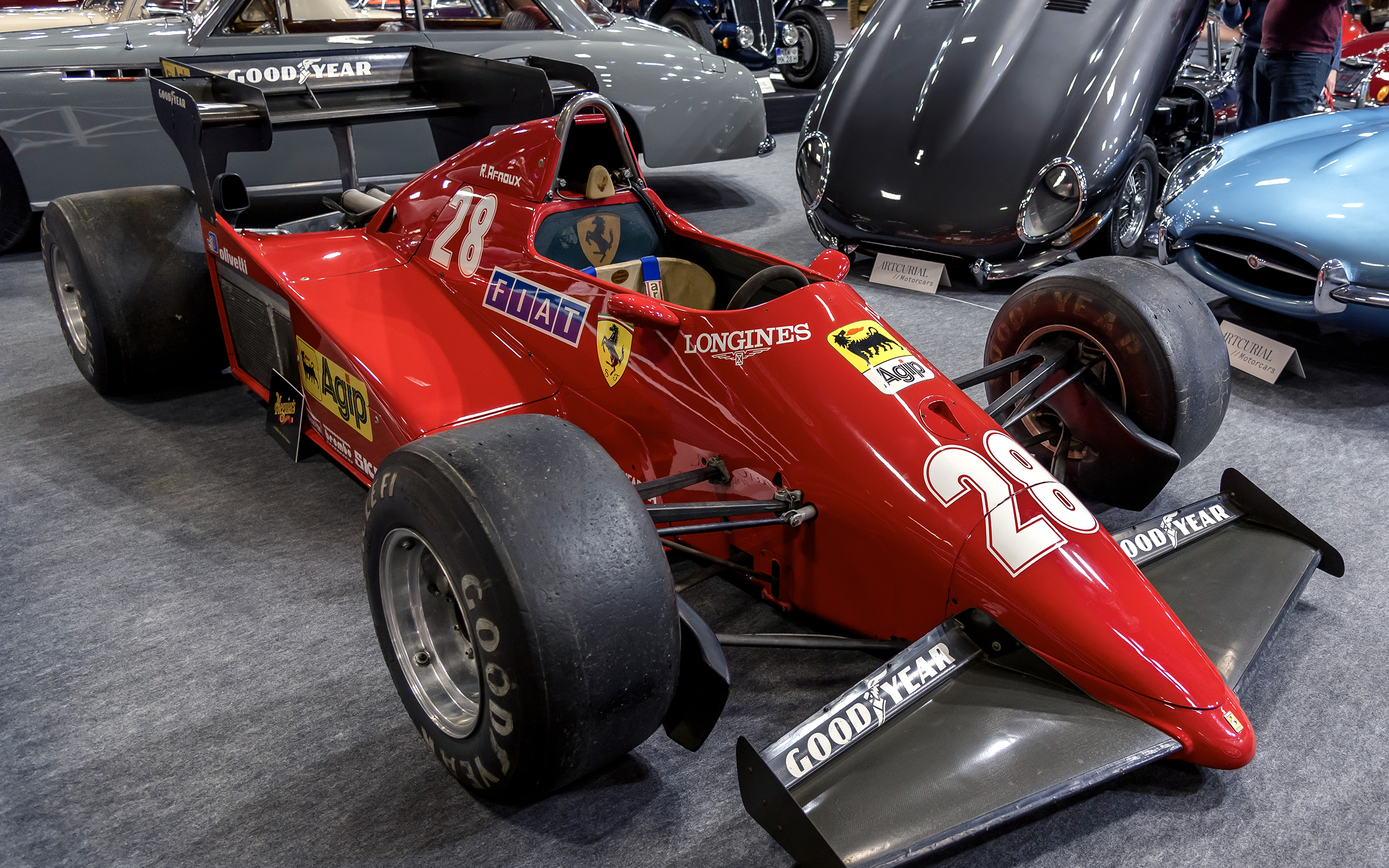
Ferrari 126C3

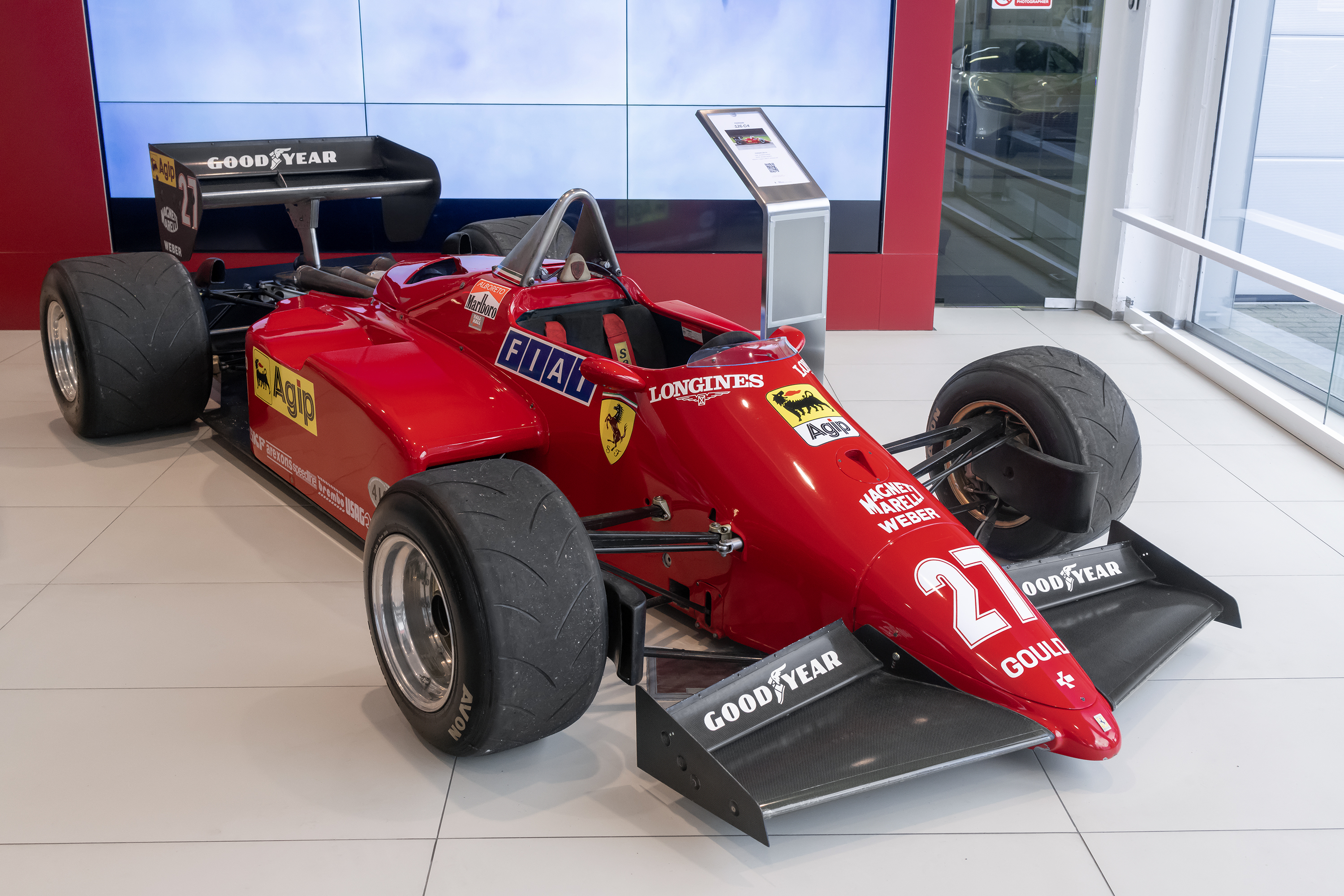
Ferrari 126C4

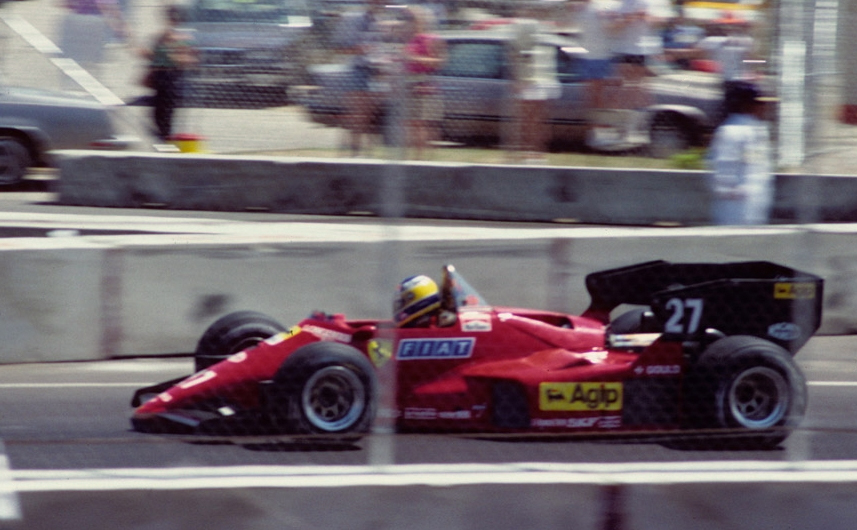
Michele Alboreto (1956–2001) driving a 126C4 at the 1984 Dallas Grand Prix

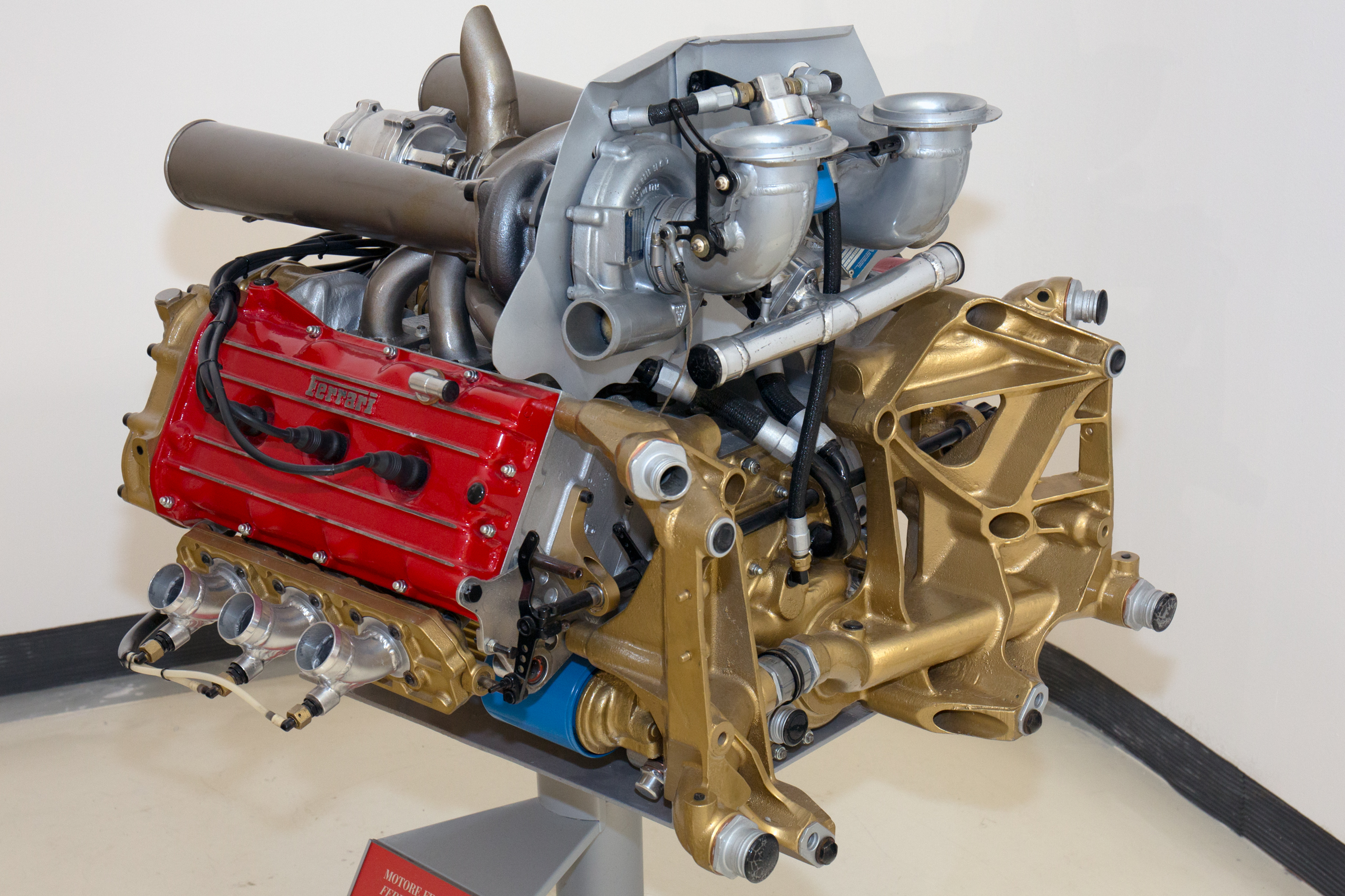
Ferrari 021 engine front Museo Ferrari

== Complete Formula One World Championship results ==
(key) (results in bold indicate pole position; results in italics indicate fastest lap)

Year	Chassis	Engine	Tyres	Drivers	1	2	3	4	5	6	7	8	9	10	11	12	13	14	15	16	Points	WCC
1981	126CK	Ferrari V6 (t/c)	MI		USW	BRA	ARG	SMR	BEL	MON	ESP	FRA	GBR	GER	AUT	NED	ITA	CAN	CPL		34	5th
1981	126CK	Ferrari V6 (t/c)	MI	(Canada) Gilles Villeneuve	Ret	Ret	Ret	**7**	4	1	1	Ret	Ret	10	Ret	Ret	Ret	3	DSQ		34	5th
1981	126CK	Ferrari V6 (t/c)	MI	(France) Didier Pironi	Ret	Ret	Ret	5	8	4	15	5	Ret	Ret	9	Ret	5	Ret	9		34	5th
1982	126C2	Ferrari V6 (t/c)	G		RSA	BRA	USW	SMR	BEL	MON	DET	CAN	NED	GBR	FRA	GER	AUT	SUI	ITA	CPL	74	1st
1982	126C2	Ferrari V6 (t/c)	G	(Canada) Gilles Villeneuve	Ret	Ret	DSQ	2	DNS												74	1st
1982	126C2	Ferrari V6 (t/c)	G	(France) Didier Pironi	18	6	Ret	1	DNS	2	3	**9**	1	2	3	**DNS**					74	1st
1982	126C2	Ferrari V6 (t/c)	G	(France) Patrick Tambay									8	3	4	1	4	DNS	2	DNS	74	1st
1982	126C2	Ferrari V6 (t/c)	G	(United States) Mario Andretti															**3**	Ret	74	1st
1983	126C2B; 126C3	Ferrari V6 (t/c)	G		BRA	USW	FRA	SMR	MON	BEL	DET	CAN	GBR	GER	AUT	NED	ITA	EUR	RSA		89	1st
1983	126C2B; 126C3	Ferrari V6 (t/c)	G	(France) Patrick Tambay	5	**Ret**	4	1	4	2	Ret	3	3	**Ret**	**Ret**	2	4	Ret	**Ret**		89	1st
1983	126C2B; 126C3	Ferrari V6 (t/c)	G	(France) René Arnoux	10	3	7	**3**	Ret	Ret	**Ret**	**1**	**5**	1	2	1	2	9	Ret		89	1st
1984	126C4	Ferrari V6 (t/c)	G		BRA	RSA	BEL	SMR	FRA	MON	CAN	DET	DAL	GBR	GER	AUT	NED	ITA	EUR	POR	57.5	2nd
1984	126C4	Ferrari V6 (t/c)	G	(France) René Arnoux	Ret	Ret	3	2	4	3	5	Ret	2	6	6	7	11†	Ret	5	9	57.5	2nd
1984	126C4	Ferrari V6 (t/c)	G	(Italy) Michele Alboreto	Ret	11	**1**	Ret	Ret	6	Ret	Ret	Ret	5	Ret	3	Ret	2	2	4	57.5	2nd
