= 1987 Japanese Grand Prix =

- Race 15 of 16 in the 1987 Formula One World Championship

Race details
- Date: 1 November 1987
- Official name: XIII Fuji Television Japanese Grand Prix
- Location: Suzuka Circuit, Suzuka, Japan
- Course: Permanent racing facility
- Course length: 5.860 km (3.641 miles)
- Distance: 51 laps, 298.860 km (185.703 miles)
- Weather: Dry
- Attendance: 247,000

Pole position
Driver	(Austria) Gerhard Berger	Ferrari
- Time: 1:40.042

Fastest lap
Driver	(France) Alain Prost	McLaren-TAG
- Time: 1:43.844 on lap 35

Podium
First	(Austria) Gerhard Berger	Ferrari
Second	(Brazil) Ayrton Senna	Lotus-Honda
Third	(Sweden) Stefan Johansson	McLaren-TAG

The 1987 Japanese Grand Prix was a Formula One motor race held at Suzuka on 1 November 1987. It was the fifteenth and penultimate race of the 1987 Formula One World Championship.

The race was won by Austrian driver Gerhard Berger driving a Ferrari F1/87. It was the end of a 38-race losing streak for Formula One's most famous team and Berger's second Grand Prix victory having won the Mexican Grand Prix the previous year driving for Benetton. Berger won by 17 seconds over Brazilian driver Ayrton Senna driving a Lotus 99T. Third was the McLaren MP4/3 of Swedish driver Stefan Johansson. This would turn out to be Team Lotus's last second place finish.

Following Nigel Mansell's withdrawal from the Grand Prix after his accident during qualifying, his teammate Nelson Piquet was prematurely crowned World Champion for the third and final time in his career before the race had even started.

== Background ==
The 1987 Japanese Grand Prix was the first race to be held in Japan since James Hunt won in his McLaren at Fuji, in 1977. This time, the Grand Prix circus utilised the Honda-owned Suzuka Circuit, which originated as a test track for Honda motorcycles and automobiles.

Soichiro Honda was extremely enthusiastic about this race, and told his racing engineers "We have to win. And we have to keep winning..." aiming for a hometown victory at Honda's home track in its native Japan. Soichiro Honda had reason for optimism as four of the entrants were powered by Honda-made engines. The Lotus 99Ts of Ayrton Senna, who had won races earlier in the season and was joined on Team Lotus with national favourite Satoru Nakajima, along with the dominating Williams FW11Bs driven by Nigel Mansell and Nelson Piquet, who were both vying for the overall championship.

Motor Sport stated that the new circuit "attracted almost unanimous praise from the drivers".

== Qualifying ==
The scene was set for a tense championship-deciding race between the Williams-Honda teammates, bitter rivals Nelson Piquet and Nigel Mansell. However, Mansell suffered a huge crash during Friday qualifying while trying to better Piquet's time, which put him out of action for both the Japanese race and the subsequent Australian Grand Prix. As a consequence, Piquet won his third World Championship before the race even began.

Qualifying once again demonstrated the return to form of Ferrari, as Gerhard Berger obtained his second pole position of the season, with the F1/87 being perfectly suited to the Suzuka circuit. Alain Prost qualified 2nd in his McLaren-TAG with Thierry Boutsen 3rd in his Benetton-Ford. Following Mansell's Friday crash, the three remaining Honda-powered cars of Piquet, Senna, and local favourite Satoru Nakajima, could only qualify in 5th, 7th and 11th places respectively. All drivers from 8th position and below moved up one position on the grid due to Mansell being unable to start. This also meant Roberto Moreno was permitted to race the AGS despite having the 27th fastest qualifying time.

Out of the 26 drivers who qualified for the race, only Riccardo Patrese had ever driven in a Japanese Grand Prix prior to 1987, having taken part of the 1977 race at Fuji.

=== Qualifying classification ===
Pos	No	Driver	Constructor	Q1	Q2	Gap	Grid
1	28	(Austria) Gerhard Berger	Ferrari	1:42.160	1:40.042		1
2	1	(France) Alain Prost	McLaren-TAG	1:42.496	1:40.652	+0.610	2
3	20	(Belgium) Thierry Boutsen	Benetton-Ford	1:43.130	1:40.850	+0.808	3
4	27	(Italy) Michele Alboreto	Ferrari	1:42.416	1:40.984	+0.942	4
5	6	(Brazil) Nelson Piquet	Williams-Honda	1:41.423	1:41.144	+1.099	5
6	19	(Italy) Teo Fabi	Benetton-Ford	1:43.351	1:41.679	+1.673	6
7	5	(United Kingdom) Nigel Mansell	Williams-Honda	1:42.616	no time	+2.573	DNS
8	12	(Brazil) Ayrton Senna	Lotus-Honda	1:44.026	1:42.723	+2.681	7
9	7	(Italy) Riccardo Patrese	Brabham-BMW	1:44.767	1:43.304	+3.262	8
10	2	(Sweden) Stefan Johansson	McLaren-TAG	1:43.612	1:43.371	+3.329	9
11	8	(Italy) Andrea de Cesaris	Brabham-BMW	1:46.399	1:43.618	+3.576	10
12	11	(Japan) Satoru Nakajima	Lotus-Honda	1:45.898	1:43.685	+3.643	11
13	18	(United States) Eddie Cheever	Arrows-Megatron	1:45.427	1:44.277	+4.385	12
14	17	(United Kingdom) Derek Warwick	Arrows-Megatron	1:44.768	1:44.626	+4.584	13
15	24	(Italy) Alessandro Nannini	Minardi-Motori Moderni	1:48.948	1:45.612	+5.570	14
16	9	(United Kingdom) Martin Brundle	Zakspeed	1:46.715	1:46.023	+5.981	15
17	10	(West Germany) Christian Danner	Zakspeed	1:49.337	1:46.116	+6.074	16
18	25	(France) René Arnoux	Ligier-Megatron	1:50.542	1:46.200	+6.158	17
19	30	(France) Philippe Alliot	Lola-Ford	1:49.470	1:47.395	+7.353	18
20	3	(United Kingdom) Jonathan Palmer	Tyrrell-Ford	1:48.902	1:47.775	+7.733	19
21	16	(Italy) Ivan Capelli	March-Ford	1:49.814	1:48.212	+8.170	20
22	23	(Spain) Adrián Campos	Minardi-Motori Moderni	1:53.455	1:48.337	+8.295	21
23	29	(France) Yannick Dalmas	Lola-Ford	1:51.230	1:48.887	+8.845	22
24	21	(Italy) Alex Caffi	Osella-Alfa Romeo	1:49.017	1:50.902	+8.975	23
25	26	(Italy) Piercarlo Ghinzani	Ligier-Megatron	1:51.554	1:49.641	+9.599	24
26	4	(France) Philippe Streiff	Tyrrell-Ford	1:50.896	1:49.741	+9.699	25
27	14	(Brazil) Roberto Moreno	AGS-Ford	1:51.835	1:50.212	+10.170	26

== Race ==
At the start Berger immediately imposed his authority by building a cushion. Prost, in his McLaren, perhaps the only driver capable of challenging Berger for the victory, suffered a puncture on the first lap and, therefore, was out of contention. Prost, however, drove a superb race to climb up through the field finishing just outside the points with the consolation of having the fastest lap. Boutsen's Benetton ran second early on but could not live with the pace set by Berger, ultimately fading to fifth. Piquet spent much of the race behind Senna's Lotus but was unable to find a way past his countryman. The new world champion eventually retired in the pits with oil pouring from the rear of his Williams. At one stage Stefan Johansson in the McLaren closed on Berger, but the Austrian driver responded and eventually romped to a seemingly effortless victory, the first Ferrari's victory since the 1985 German Grand Prix. Ayrton Senna dramatically passed Johansson on the last lap to take second place. Michele Alboreto, in the second Ferrari, got away very slowly at the green lights leaving him towards the rear of the field. However, the Italian drove an aggressive race to climb his way back up the order to finish an excellent fourth despite suffering from a dragging undertray causing a huge amount of sparks. Boutsen and Nakajima rounded out the points.

Johansson's third place was the 54th and last podium finish for the Porsche-designed TAG turbo V6 engine which had been first used in Formula One by McLaren at the 1983 Dutch Grand Prix.

=== Race classification ===
Pos	No	Driver	Constructor	Laps	Time/Retired	Grid	Points
1	28	(Austria) Gerhard Berger	Ferrari	51	1:32:58.072	1	9
2	12	(Brazil) Ayrton Senna	Lotus-Honda	51	+ 17.384	7	6
3	2	(Sweden) Stefan Johansson	McLaren-TAG	51	+ 17.694	9	4
4	27	(Italy) Michele Alboreto	Ferrari	51	+ 1:20.441	4	3
5	20	(Belgium) Thierry Boutsen	Benetton-Ford	51	+ 1:25.576	3	2
6	11	(Japan) Satoru Nakajima	Lotus-Honda	51	+ 1:36.479	11	1
7	1	(France) Alain Prost	McLaren-TAG	50	+ 1 lap	2	
8 (1)	3	(United Kingdom) Jonathan Palmer	Tyrrell-Ford	50	+ 1 lap	19	
9	18	(United States) Eddie Cheever	Arrows-Megatron	50	Out of fuel	12	
10	17	(United Kingdom) Derek Warwick	Arrows-Megatron	50	+ 1 lap	13	
11	7	(Italy) Riccardo Patrese	Brabham-BMW	49	+ 2 laps	8	
12 (2)	4	(France) Philippe Streiff	Tyrrell-Ford	49	+ 2 laps	25	
13	26	(Italy) Piercarlo Ghinzani	Ligier-Megatron	48	+ 3 laps	24	
14 (3)	29	(France) Yannick Dalmas	Lola-Ford	47	+ 4 laps	22	
15	6	(Brazil) Nelson Piquet	Williams-Honda	46	Engine	5	
Ret	25	(France) René Arnoux	Ligier-Megatron	44	Out of fuel	17	
Ret	21	(Italy) Alex Caffi	Osella-Alfa Romeo	43	Out of fuel	23	
Ret	14	(Brazil) Roberto Moreno	AGS-Ford	38	Electrical	26	
Ret	24	(Italy) Alessandro Nannini	Minardi-Motori Moderni	35	Engine	14	
Ret	9	(United Kingdom) Martin Brundle	Zakspeed	32	Engine	15	
Ret	8	(Italy) Andrea de Cesaris	Brabham-BMW	26	Engine	10	
Ret	19	(Italy) Teo Fabi	Benetton-Ford	16	Engine	6	
Ret	10	(West Germany) Christian Danner	Zakspeed	13	Engine	16	
Ret	16	(Italy) Ivan Capelli	March-Ford	13	Accident	20	
Ret	23	(Spain) Adrián Campos	Minardi-Motori Moderni	2	Engine	21	
Ret	30	(France) Philippe Alliot	Lola-Ford	0	Accident	18	
DNS	5	(United Kingdom) Nigel Mansell	Williams-Honda		Qualifying practice accident		

* Numbers in brackets refer to positions of normally aspirated entrants competing for the Jim Clark Trophy.

== Championship standings after the race ==
- **Bold text** indicates the World Champions.

Drivers' Championship standings

Pos	Driver	Points
1	(Brazil) **Nelson Piquet**	73 (76)
2	(United Kingdom) Nigel Mansell	61
3	(Brazil) Ayrton Senna	57
4	(France) Alain Prost	46
5	(Sweden) Stefan Johansson	30

Constructors' Championship standings

Pos	Constructor	Points
1	(United Kingdom) **Williams-Honda**	137
2	(United Kingdom) McLaren-TAG	76
3	(United Kingdom) Lotus-Honda	64
4	(Italy) Ferrari	38
5	(United Kingdom) Benetton-Ford	24

Jim Clark Trophy standings

Pos	Driver	Points
1	(United Kingdom) Jonathan Palmer	86
2	(France) Philippe Streiff	74
3	(France) Philippe Alliot	43
4	(Italy) Ivan Capelli	38
5	(France) Pascal Fabre	35

Colin Chapman Trophy standings

Pos	Constructor	Points
1	(United Kingdom) Tyrrell-Ford	160
2	(France) Lola-Ford	43
3	(United Kingdom) March-Ford	38
4	(France) AGS-Ford	35

- Note: Only the top five positions are included for all four sets of standings.

Previous race: 1987 Mexican Grand Prix	FIA Formula One World Championship; 1987 season	Next race: 1987 Australian Grand Prix
Previous race: 1977 Japanese Grand Prix	Japanese Grand Prix	Next race: 1988 Japanese Grand Prix
Awards
Preceded by 1986 Mexican Grand Prix	Formula One Promotional Trophy for Race Promoter; 1987	Succeeded by 1988 British Grand Prix
