= 1987 Australian Grand Prix =

Race 16 of 16 in the 1987 Formula One World Championship
← Previous race	Next race →

Race details
- Date: 15 November 1987
- Official name: LII Foster's Australian Grand Prix
- Location: Adelaide Street Circuit; Adelaide, South Australia
- Course: Temporary street circuit
- Course length: 3.780 km (2.362 miles)
- Distance: 82 laps, 309.960 km (193.684 miles)
- Weather: Sunny

Pole position
Driver	(Austria) Gerhard Berger	Ferrari
- Time: 1:17.267

Fastest lap
Driver	(Austria) Gerhard Berger	Ferrari
- Time: 1:20.416 on lap 72

Podium
First	(Austria) Gerhard Berger	Ferrari
Second	(Italy) Michele Alboreto	Ferrari
Third	(Belgium) Thierry Boutsen	Benetton-Ford

The 1987 Australian Grand Prix was a Formula One motor race held at Adelaide on 15 November 1987. It was the sixteenth and final race of the 1987 Formula One World Championship.

The 82-lap race was won by Austrian driver Gerhard Berger, who started from pole position, achieved the fastest lap and led every lap in his Ferrari, earning him his only grand chelem in his career. The win would end up being the last Ferrari win during team founder Enzo Ferrari's life, who would die in August of the following year. Brazilian Ayrton Senna finished second in his Lotus-Honda but was subsequently disqualified, thus promoting Berger's Italian teammate Michele Alboreto to second and the Benetton-Ford of Belgian Thierry Boutsen to third. Following Senna's disqualification, it was a rare distinction of the dubbed "Big Four" failing to score points at the same Grand Prix for various reasons. (Note: While Mansell did not even enter the Grand Prix due to injury, Prost and eventual champion Piquet retired from the race along with Senna's disqualification.)

== Background ==
Nigel Mansell was still recovering from his accident in the previous race in Japan and so Riccardo Patrese, who had already signed for Williams to partner Mansell in 1988, was given permission by Brabham owner Bernie Ecclestone to stand in for the Briton in this race; he was replaced at Brabham by Formula 3000 champion Stefano Modena, making his Formula One debut.

== Qualifying report ==
Despite being ill during qualifying, Gerhard Berger took pole position in his Ferrari by 0.7 seconds from Alain Prost in the McLaren. In his final race for Williams Nelson Piquet took third, with compatriot Ayrton Senna fourth in his final race for Lotus; they were followed by Thierry Boutsen in the Benetton and Michele Alboreto in the second Ferrari. Patrese was seventh in the second Williams, with Stefan Johansson in the second McLaren, Teo Fabi in the second Benetton and Andrea de Cesaris in the Brabham completing the top ten. Modena took 15th, just behind Satoru Nakajima in the second Lotus.

=== Qualifying classification ===
Pos	No	Driver	Constructor	Q1	Q2	Gap
1	28	(Austria) Gerhard Berger	Ferrari	1:17.267	1:18.142	
2	1	(France) Alain Prost	McLaren-TAG	1:18.200	1:17.967	+0.700
3	6	(Brazil) Nelson Piquet	Williams-Honda	1:18.017	1:18.176	+0.750
4	12	(Brazil) Ayrton Senna	Lotus-Honda	1:18.508	1:18.488	+1.221
5	20	(Belgium) Thierry Boutsen	Benetton-Ford	1:18.943	1:18.523	+1.256
6	27	(Italy) Michele Alboreto	Ferrari	1:18.578	1:19.612	+1.311
7	5	(Italy) Riccardo Patrese	Williams-Honda	1:19.507	1:18.813	+1.546
8	2	(Sweden) Stefan Johansson	McLaren-TAG	1:19.761	1:18.826	+1.559
9	19	(Italy) Teo Fabi	Benetton-Ford	1:19.461	1:20.301	+2.194
10	8	(Italy) Andrea de Cesaris	Brabham-BMW	1:19.768	1:19.590	+2.323
11	18	(United States) Eddie Cheever	Arrows-Megatron	1:20.187	1:21.592	+2.920
12	17	(United Kingdom) Derek Warwick	Arrows-Megatron	1:20.638	1:20.837	+3.371
13	24	(Italy) Alessandro Nannini	Minardi-Motori Moderni	1:20.701	1:21.523	+3.434
14	11	(Japan) Satoru Nakajima	Lotus-Honda	1:21.708	1:20.891	+3.624
15	7	(Italy) Stefano Modena	Brabham-BMW	1:21.887	1:21.014	+3.747
16	9	(United Kingdom) Martin Brundle	Zakspeed	1:22.224	1:21.483	+4.216
17	30	(France) Philippe Alliot	Lola-Ford	1:21.888	1:22.846	+4.621
18	4	(France) Philippe Streiff	Tyrrell-Ford	1:21.971	1:22.434	+4.704
19	3	(United Kingdom) Jonathan Palmer	Tyrrell-Ford	1:22.315	1:22.087	+4.820
20	25	(France) René Arnoux	Ligier-Megatron	1:24.833	1:22.303	+5.036
21	29	(France) Yannick Dalmas	Lola-Ford	1:25.021	1:22.650	+5.383
22	26	(Italy) Piercarlo Ghinzani	Ligier-Megatron	1:22.689	1:24.652	+5.422
23	16	(Italy) Ivan Capelli	March-Ford	1:22.698	1:22.704	+5.437
24	10	(West Germany) Christian Danner	Zakspeed	1:23.046	1:22.736	+5.469
25	14	(Brazil) Roberto Moreno	AGS-Ford	1:23.659	1:24.149	+6.392
26	23	(Spain) Adrián Campos	Minardi-Motori Moderni	1:25.760	1:24.121	+6.859
DNQ	21	(Italy) Alex Caffi	Osella-Alfa Romeo	1:25.872	1:27.331	+8.585

== Race report ==
At the green light, Piquet darted past Berger to take the lead into the first chicane, whilst Alessandro Nannini in the Minardi was out immediately after crashing into the wall on the exit. A confident Berger, fresh from his victory in the previous race in Japan, re-passed Piquet at Wakefield Corner and began to pull away from the field.

Early retirements included Philippe Streiff spinning off in his Tyrrell on lap 7 and Nakajima suffering a hydraulics failure on lap 23. Modena's debut ended on lap 32 when he stopped in the pits due to exhaustion.

The battle for second between Piquet, Prost, Alboreto and Senna changed little until lap 35, when Piquet pitted for tyres and dropped to sixth. On lap 42, Prost found himself baulked by former teammate René Arnoux in the Ligier on the pit straight and Alboreto slipped through, before Senna powered past both the McLaren and the Ferrari.

Attrition kicked in as the race continued, with brakes in particular becoming a big issue. Fabi was the first brake-related retirement on lap 47, followed by Johansson on lap 49 and Prost on lap 54. Piquet's brakes also failed on lap 59, leaving Berger, Senna and Alboreto as the top three followed by Boutsen and Patrese.

In the latter stages of the race Senna made a charge, closing to within eight seconds of Berger, before the Austrian pulled away again, setting the fastest lap of the race on lap 72. Berger crossed the finish line just under 35 seconds ahead of Senna, with Alboreto the only other driver on the lead lap and Boutsen, Jonathan Palmer in the second Tyrrell and Yannick Dalmas in the Larrousse completing the top six after Patrese suffered a late oil leak.

In post-race scrutineering it was discovered that the brake ducts on Senna's Lotus were oversized, resulting in his disqualification from the race. Alboreto was duly promoted to second, giving Ferrari a 1-2 finish, with Boutsen third, Palmer fourth, Dalmas fifth and Roberto Moreno sixth, scoring the AGS team's first World Championship point. The only other classified finishers were Christian Danner in the Zakspeed, de Cesaris and Patrese. Dalmas did not receive the two points for his fifth place, as he was driving Larrousse's second car and the team had officially entered only one car for the championship, with that car being driven by Philippe Alliot.

=== Race classification ===
Pos	No	Driver	Constructor	Laps	Time/Retired	Grid	Points
1	28	(Austria) Gerhard Berger	Ferrari	82	1:52:56.144	1	9
2	27	(Italy) Michele Alboreto	Ferrari	82	+ 1:07.884	6	6
3	20	(Belgium) Thierry Boutsen	Benetton-Ford	81	+ 1 lap	5	4
4 (1)	3	(United Kingdom) Jonathan Palmer	Tyrrell-Ford	80	+ 2 laps	19	3
5 (2)	29	(France) Yannick Dalmas	Lola-Ford	79	+ 3 laps	21	0*
6 (3)	14	(Brazil) Roberto Moreno	AGS-Ford	79	+ 3 laps	25	1
7	10	(Germany) Christian Danner	Zakspeed	79	+ 3 laps	24	
8	8	(Italy) Andrea de Cesaris	Brabham-BMW	78	Spun off	10	
9	5	(Italy) Riccardo Patrese	Williams-Honda	76	Oil leak	7	
DSQ	12	(Brazil) Ayrton Senna	Lotus-Honda	82	Illegal brake ducts	4	
Ret	6	(Brazil) Nelson Piquet	Williams-Honda	58	Brakes	3	
Ret	16	(Italy) Ivan Capelli	March-Ford	58	Spun off	23	
Ret	1	(France) Alain Prost	McLaren-TAG	53	Brakes	2	
Ret	18	(United States) Eddie Cheever	Arrows-Megatron	53	Overheating	11	
Ret	2	(Sweden) Stefan Johansson	McLaren-TAG	48	Brakes	8	
Ret	19	(Italy) Teo Fabi	Benetton-Ford	46	Brakes	9	
Ret	23	(Spain) Adrián Campos	Minardi-Motori Moderni	46	Transmission	26	
Ret	30	(France) Philippe Alliot	Lola-Ford	45	Electrical	17	
Ret	25	(France) René Arnoux	Ligier-Megatron	41	Ignition	20	
Ret	7	(Italy) Stefano Modena	Brabham-BMW	31	Physical	15	
Ret	26	(Italy) Piercarlo Ghinzani	Ligier-Megatron	26	Ignition	22	
Ret	11	(Japan) Satoru Nakajima	Lotus-Honda	22	Hydraulics	14	
Ret	17	(United Kingdom) Derek Warwick	Arrows-Megatron	19	Transmission	12	
Ret	9	(United Kingdom) Martin Brundle	Zakspeed	18	Engine	16	
Ret	4	(France) Philippe Streiff	Tyrrell-Ford	6	Spun off	18	
Ret	24	(Italy) Alessandro Nannini	Minardi-Motori Moderni	0	Accident	13	

* Dalmas did not receive points towards the Drivers' Championship or the Jim Clark Trophy, as he was driving Larrousse-Lola's second car and the team had officially entered only one car for the entire championship.

== Championship standings after the race ==
- **Bold text** indicates the World Champions.

Drivers' Championship standings

Pos	Driver	Points
1	(Brazil) **Nelson Piquet**	73 (76)
2	(United Kingdom) Nigel Mansell	61
3	(Brazil) Ayrton Senna	57
4	(France) Alain Prost	46
5	(Austria) Gerhard Berger	36

Constructors' Championship standings

Pos	Constructor	Points
1	(United Kingdom) **Williams-Honda**	137
2	(United Kingdom) McLaren-TAG	76
3	(United Kingdom) Lotus-Honda	64
4	(Italy) Ferrari	53
5	(United Kingdom) Benetton-Ford	28

Jim Clark Trophy standings

Pos	Driver	Points
1	(United Kingdom) Jonathan Palmer	95
2	(France) Philippe Streiff	74
3	(France) Philippe Alliot	43
4	(Italy) Ivan Capelli	38
5	(France) Pascal Fabre	35

Colin Chapman Trophy standings

Pos	Constructor	Points
1	(United Kingdom) Tyrrell-Ford	169
2	(France) Lola-Ford	43
3	(France) AGS-Ford	39
4	(United Kingdom) March-Ford	38

- Note: Only the top five positions are included for all four sets of standings.

Previous race: 1987 Japanese Grand Prix	FIA Formula One World Championship; 1987 season	Next race: 1988 Brazilian Grand Prix
Previous race: 1986 Australian Grand Prix	Australian Grand Prix	Next race: 1988 Australian Grand Prix
