= Techniques d'Avant Garde =

Luxembourg aviation company

TAG Group (Holdings) S.A.
- Type: Private
- Industry: Aviation, Motorsports, Hospitality
- Founded: 1977; 49 years ago
- Founder: Akram Ojjeh
- Headquarters: Luxembourg City, Luxembourg
- Area served: Worldwide

TAG Group (Holdings) S.A. is a private holding company based in Luxembourg City, Luxembourg. The name 'TAG' is an acronym of Techniques d'Avant Garde. The company generates revenue through its various subsidiaries that offer products and services in the business aviation, motorsports, hospitality, consumer products and real estate industries.

== History ==
TAG was formed in 1977 by Syrian businessman Akram Ojjeh and was, until his death, led by Chief Executive Officer Mansour Ojjeh, the son of the founder.

One of the first contracts obtained by TAG (Al Mansour, Ets. Akkram Ojjeh, dept. Housing TAG) came from the Saudi Government (presumably for the Royal Saudi Air Force) for works on airports in Riyadh, Tabuk and Khamis Musheit (Abha) (IATA: RUH, TUU and ABH) starting in 1977. A lot of works were subcontracted to the Belgian company CFE S.A., located in Brussels, who leased a Boeing 707 from Sabena Airlines (callsign OO-SJH, mixed cargo/pax) to transport personnel and materials to/from Saudi Arabia. The OO-SJH carried the TAG logo on its tail for some 3 years.

In 1985, TAG Group (Holdings) S.A. purchased Swiss watchmaker Heuer. TAG Group combined the TAG and Heuer brands to create the TAG Heuer brand and also gave its newly acquired watchmaking subsidiary the combined TAG Heuer name. Under TAG Group's ownership, TAG Heuer modernized its product line and significantly increased worldwide sales. LVMH purchased the TAG Heuer subsidiary in 1999 for US $740 million. TAG Group is now primarily a holding company for Ojjeh's shareholdings in TAG Aviation and McLaren Group.

== Activities ==
=== Aviation ===
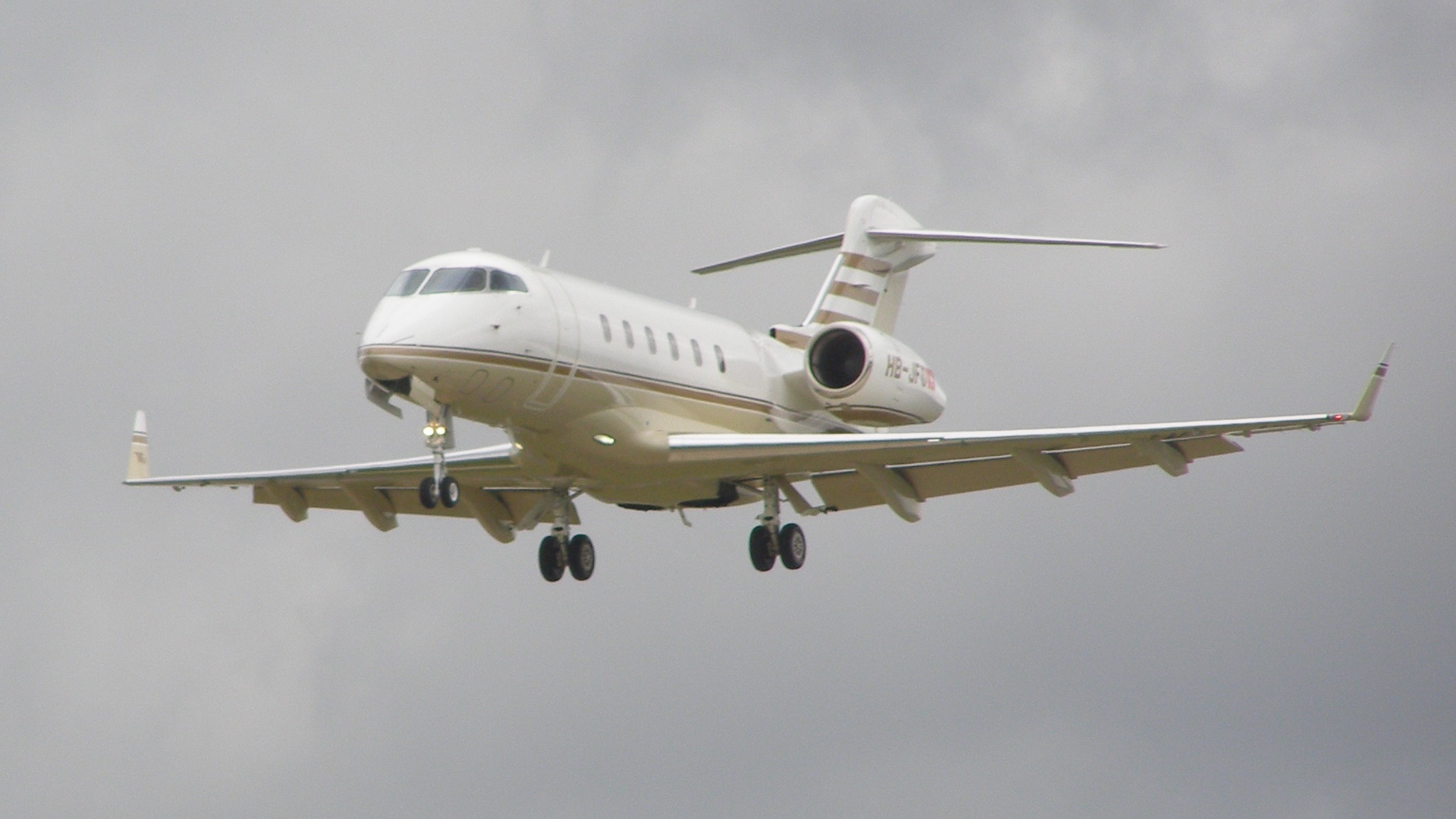
Bombardier Challenger 300 business jet

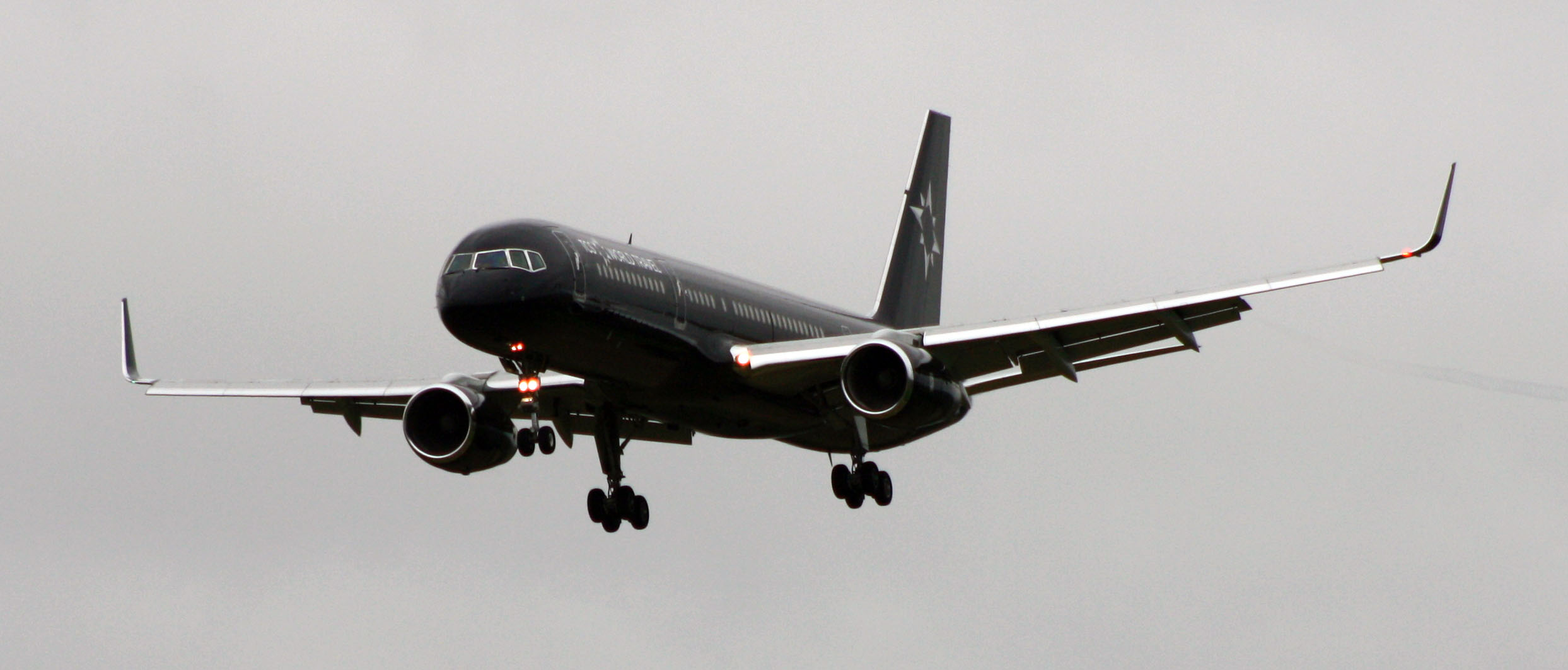
Boeing 757-200

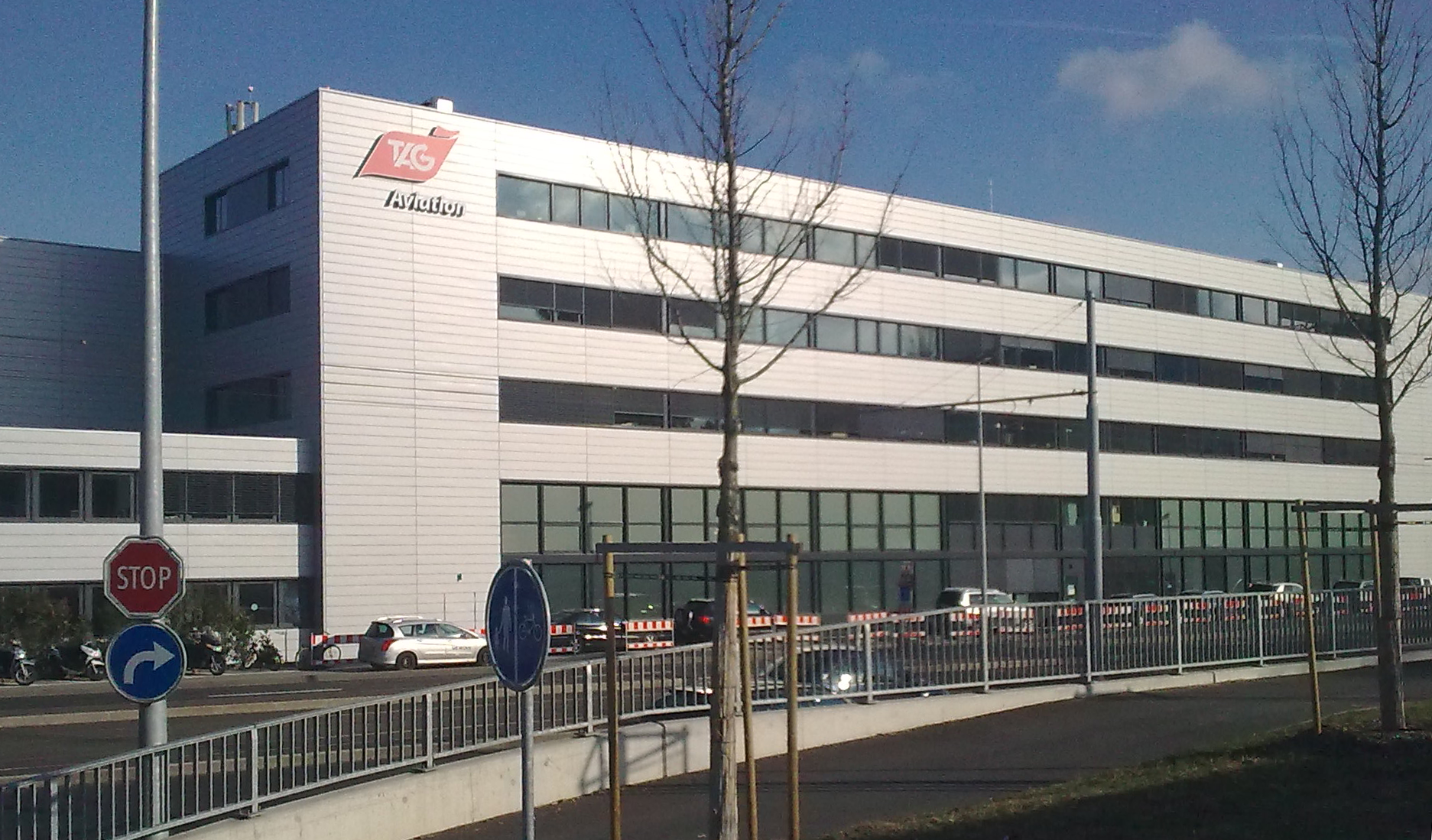
TAG Aviation headquarters building in Meyrin, Switzerland

TAG Aeronautics was the distributor of Bombardier aircraft in the Middle East until January 2016.

Based in Geneva, Switzerland, TAG Aviation is a provider of business aviation services, aircraft management, aircraft charter, maintenance, sales and acquisitions. TAG was a broker for and part owner of the AMI Jet Charter company in San Francisco that holds the FAA air carrier certificate to operate in the US. In late 2007 AMI Jet Charter's air carrier certificate was revoked by the FAA due to alleged operational control violations. However, there is ongoing speculation the FAA had other motives other than operational control. The company now operates solely as a broker of aircraft. In August 2016, TAG Aviation signed a partnership with Stratajet to offer its customers TAG's fixed base operator (FBO) services as part of their booking options.

Their fleet comprises around 50 aircraft. Other than the already mentioned Bombardier, they also operate several Gulfstream models (three G650ER, G600, G280, G450, G550), Dassault Falcon 6X and 7X, a Pilatus PC-24 and two Embraer Phenom 300E. The Embraer aircraft are available for charter flights in Zurich and Geneva. To facilitate their large fleet, in 2023 they began using Leon Software as their operating software.

TAG Farnborough Airport Ltd. is a subsidiary of TAG Aviation which used to own the freehold on Farnborough Airport southwest of London in the United Kingdom. The freehold was bought from the UK MOD Ministry of Defence in 2007 following the previous 99 lease agreement signed in 1999. Farnborough Airport was then subsequently sold to Macquarie in 2019. In 2018, the CAA's decision to grant TAG's application for large controlled zones in a large swathe of airspace near Farnborough was to be investigated by the All-Party Parliamentary Group (APPG) on General Aviation.

=== Motorsport ===
TAG as a Formula One engine manufacturer
Formula One World Championship career
- First entry: 1983 Dutch Grand Prix
- Last entry: 1987 Australian Grand Prix
- Races entered: 68
- Chassis: McLaren
- Constructors' Championships: 2 (1984, 1985) (Note: All Constructors' Championships achieved by Porsche-built engines.)
- Drivers' Championships: 3 (1984, 1985, 1986) (Note: All Drivers' Championships achieved by Porsche-built engines.)
- Race victories: 25 (Note: All race victories achieved by Porsche-built engines.)
- Podiums: 54 (Note: All podiums achieved by Porsche-built engines.)
- Points: 405.5 (Note: All points scored by Porsche-built engines.)
- Pole positions: 7 (Note: All pole positions achieved by Porsche-built engines.)
- Fastest laps: 18 (Note: All fastest laps achieved by Porsche-built engines.)

TAG sponsored Formula One team Williams during the early 1980s, covering the period when team drivers Alan Jones and Keke Rosberg won the 1980 and 1982 World Championships respectively. During the 1983 season, Mansour Ojjeh had a meeting with McLaren team boss Ron Dennis, who offered Ojjeh the chance of not just a sponsorship deal but having part ownership of McLaren. Ojjeh agreed and the McLaren relationship continues to this day, with the TAG Group currently owning 14% of McLaren Group until 2024. Consequently TAG also has stakes in McLaren Group's subsidiaries. McLaren's most famous companies include McLaren Racing and McLaren Automotive. From 1983 to 1987 the Porsche engines used in the McLaren F1 car were badged as TAG engines. During which time they won the 1984 and 1985 constructors' titles and 1984 to 1986 drivers' titles.

=== Formula One engine results ===
(key) (results in bold indicate pole position; results in italics indicate fastest lap)

Year	Entrant	Chassis	Engine	Tyres	Drivers	1	2	3	4	5	6	7	8	9	10	11	12	13	14	15	16	Points	WCC
1983	Marlboro McLaren International	McLaren MP4/1E	TAG (Porsche) TTE PO1 1.5 V6 t	MI		BRA	USW	FRA	SMR	MON	BEL	DET	CAN	GBR	GER	AUT	NED	ITA	EUR	RSA		0	NC
1983	Marlboro McLaren International	McLaren MP4/1E	TAG (Porsche) TTE PO1 1.5 V6 t	MI	(Austria) Niki Lauda												Ret	Ret	Ret	11^{†}		0	NC
1983	Marlboro McLaren International	McLaren MP4/1E	TAG (Porsche) TTE PO1 1.5 V6 t	MI	(United Kingdom) John Watson													Ret	Ret	DSQ		0	NC
1984	Marlboro McLaren International	McLaren MP4/2	TAG (Porsche) TTE PO1 1.5 V6 t	MI		BRA	RSA	BEL	SMR	FRA	MON	CAN	DET	DAL	GBR	GER	AUT	NED	ITA	EUR	POR	**143.5**	**1st**
1984	Marlboro McLaren International	McLaren MP4/2	TAG (Porsche) TTE PO1 1.5 V6 t	MI	(Austria) Niki Lauda	Ret	1	Ret	Ret	1	Ret	2	Ret	Ret	1	2	1	2	1	4	2	**143.5**	**1st**
1984	Marlboro McLaren International	McLaren MP4/2	TAG (Porsche) TTE PO1 1.5 V6 t	MI	(France) Alain Prost	1	2	Ret	1	7	**1**^{‡}	3	4	Ret	Ret	**1**	Ret	**1**	Ret	1	1	**143.5**	**1st**
1985	Marlboro McLaren International	McLaren MP4/2B	TAG (Porsche) TTE PO1 1.5 V6 t	G		BRA	POR	SMR	MON	CAN	DET	FRA	GBR	GER	AUT	NED	ITA	BEL	EUR	RSA	AUS	**90**	**1st**
1985	Marlboro McLaren International	McLaren MP4/2B	TAG (Porsche) TTE PO1 1.5 V6 t	G	(Austria) Niki Lauda	Ret	Ret	4	Ret	Ret	Ret	Ret	Ret	5	Ret	1	Ret	DNS		Ret	Ret	**90**	**1st**
1985	Marlboro McLaren International	McLaren MP4/2B	TAG (Porsche) TTE PO1 1.5 V6 t	G	(United Kingdom) John Watson														7			**90**	**1st**
1985	Marlboro McLaren International	McLaren MP4/2B	TAG (Porsche) TTE PO1 1.5 V6 t	G	(France) Alain Prost	1	Ret	DSQ	1	3	Ret	3	1	2	**1**	2	1	**3**	4	3	Ret	**90**	**1st**
1986	Marlboro McLaren International	McLaren MP4/2C	TAG (Porsche) TTE PO1 1.5 V6 t	G		BRA	ESP	SMR	MON	BEL	CAN	DET	FRA	GBR	GER	HUN	AUT	ITA	POR	MEX	AUS	**96**	**2nd**
1986	Marlboro McLaren International	McLaren MP4/2C	TAG (Porsche) TTE PO1 1.5 V6 t	G	(France) Alain Prost	Ret	3	1	**1**	6	2	3	2	3	6^{†}	Ret	1	DSQ	2	2	1	**96**	**2nd**
1986	Marlboro McLaren International	McLaren MP4/2C	TAG (Porsche) TTE PO1 1.5 V6 t	G	(Finland) Keke Rosberg	Ret	4	5^{†}	2	Ret	4	Ret	4	Ret	**5**^{†}	Ret	9^{†}	4	Ret	Ret	Ret	**96**	**2nd**
1987	Marlboro McLaren International	McLaren MP4/3	TAG (Porsche) TTE PO1 1.5 V6 t	G		BRA	SMR	BEL	MON	DET	FRA	GBR	GER	HUN	AUT	ITA	POR	ESP	MEX	JPN	AUS	**76**	**2nd**
1987	Marlboro McLaren International	McLaren MP4/3	TAG (Porsche) TTE PO1 1.5 V6 t	G	(France) Alain Prost	1	Ret	1	9^{†}	3	3	Ret	7^{†}	3	6	15	1	2	Ret	7	Ret	**76**	**2nd**
1987	Marlboro McLaren International	McLaren MP4/3	TAG (Porsche) TTE PO1 1.5 V6 t	G	(Sweden) Stefan Johansson	3	4	2	Ret	7	8	Ret	2	Ret	7	6	5	3	Ret	3	Ret	**76**	**2nd**

Notes

- ^{†} – Driver did not finish the Grand Prix, but was classified as he completed over 90% of the race distance.
- ^{‡} – Half points awarded as less than 75% of the race distance was completed.

=== Other ===
Other areas of business include advanced technology, real estate and consumer products.
