= Haas Lola =

Former American Formula One team

- Full name: Team Haas (USA) Ltd.
- Base: Colnbrook, England, United Kingdom
- Founder(s): Carl Haas
- Noted drivers: (Australia) Alan Jones (France) Patrick Tambay (United States) Eddie Cheever

Formula One World Championship career
- First entry: 1985 Italian Grand Prix
- Races entered: 20 (19 starts)
- Constructors: Lola-Hart; Lola-Ford
- Constructors' Championships: 0
- Drivers' Championships: 0
- Race victories: 0
- Pole positions: 0
- Fastest laps: 0
- Final entry: 1986 Australian Grand Prix

Team Haas (USA) Ltd., sometimes called Beatrice Haas after its major sponsor, was an American Formula One team founded by Carl Haas in 1984 after an agreement with Beatrice Foods, a US consumer products conglomerate, which competed in the World Championship from 1985 to 1986. An agreement to use Ford engines for three seasons faltered after a change of management at Beatrice. The firing of Beatrice CEO Jim Dutt led to Beatrice withdrawing their funding of the project. The team was unable to continue in Formula One after the 1986 season. 1980 World Champion Alan Jones was coaxed out of retirement to drive the team's first car at the end of the 1985 season and on into 1986. Future prestigious designers Ross Brawn and Adrian Newey passed through the team.

The team also was commonly known as Haas Lola due to Haas's association with Lola Cars International, although Lola was not involved in the project. Their cars were actually designed by Haas-owned design and construction company known as FORCE. Lola however earned the team's points towards the Constructors' Championships as the team's designated constructor, and the cars were named with the acronym THL for Team Haas Lola.

== Team history ==
=== Backing from Beatrice and Ford ===
In autumn 1984, Carl Haas had successfully negotiated a sponsorship deal with Beatrice Foods for Haas's entry into the Formula One World Championship. At the urging of Beatrice Foods' CEO, Jim Dutt, Haas dropped sponsor Budweiser and took on Beatrice as title sponsor of their Championship Auto Racing Teams (CART) IndyCar team. With the aid of Beatrice, later that year Haas announced an engine supplier for the program. Ford was in the process of developing a turbocharged V6 engine (known as the TEC) as a replacement for their aged naturally aspirated Cosworth DFV V8 which was no longer able to successfully compete with its turbocharged competitors. The deal was announced to last for three seasons, with Haas being the exclusive receiver of the new engines. As part of the announcement, former World Champion Alan Jones announced his return from retirement to drive the team's first car in 1985, his first time in the sport since Long Beach in 1983. The development of the GBA engine at Cosworth was documented for Channel 4's Equinox series and broadcast on TV in 1986.

With cash flow and engines, Carl Haas began creating the team as well as organising a design team to develop a new car. Former McLaren owner Teddy Mayer was recruited to the project and aided the team in setting up their base, purchasing a disused factory in Colnbrook, England, and establishing the company Formula One Race Car Engineering (FORCE). The FORCE base housed the team's designers, led by former Williams engineer Neil Oatley, and included an up-and-coming designer in Formula One, Ross Brawn, as the lead aerodynamicist. The team's cars were also to be built in the same factory.

Even with FORCE designing and building the cars, Carl Haas chose to enter the cars in the 1985 season under the constructor name of Lola. Haas was the official importer of cars from British firm Lola Cars International to the United States, and wished to associate the more popular Lola name with the team. Lola was however not involved in the project, and played no part in the design or construction of the team's cars.

=== 1985 season ===
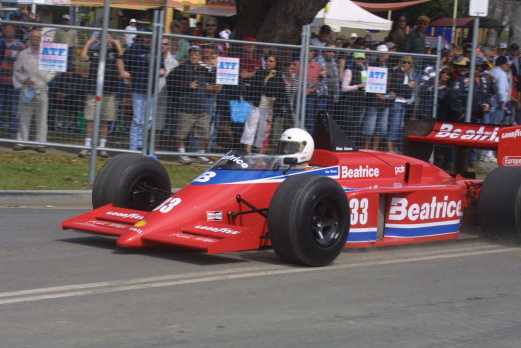
The Lola THL1 as driven by Alan Jones, pictured in 2007

Team Haas's first car, the Oatley-designed THL1, was still under development at the start of the 1985 season and would only be ready to race at the twelfth round, the Italian Grand Prix. The team's promised Ford TEC engines were also not ready (the deal to build the turbocharged V6 Ford was only agreed to at the 1984 British Grand Prix and engine designer Keith Duckworth lost four months unsuccessfully trying to develop a 4 cylinder engine before eventually deciding on a V6). This forced Haas to do a deal with Hart Racing Engines to use their 1.5-litre turbocharged, 4 cylinder 415T engines until the Ford units could be completed, while Goodyear became the team's tyre supplier.

When the team made their first race appearance at Monza, Jones qualified 25th out of 26 cars, before the Hart engine failed after only six laps. Haas were unable to race in the next round, the Belgian Grand Prix at Spa, as this race had been rescheduled from earlier in the season after the circuit's newly-laid surface broke up badly during practice, and as they were not on the original entry list they were not allowed to compete.

The team returned at the European Grand Prix at Brands Hatch, where Jones qualified 22nd but retired after 13 laps due to radiator damage.

In South Africa, Jones qualified 18th out of 21 cars, but did not take the start. The official reason for this was that he had fallen ill, although it was rumored at the time that the team had decided to join the French Renault and Ligier teams in boycotting the race in protest to South Africa's apartheid policy. In 2017, Jones described a meeting with Bernie Ecclestone the night before the race, who suggested that Jones feign illness the next morning and not show up. Ecclestone described how Beatrice were under pressure in the US from activists such as Jesse Jackson not to race, under threats including strike action by African Americans working in their businesses. Only Jones and team management Teddy Mayer and Carl Haas were aware of this plan. Jones said "And so, on the Saturday morning I was gone. I just didn't turn up. They had the car out ready to go, when they were told, "AJ's been struck down by a virus and we are not racing.""

The final race of the season was in Australia, and after home favourite Jones had the honour of being the first to drive his car onto the new Adelaide Street Circuit, he qualified 19th, and then showed that he had lost none of his skill by recovering from a stall on the grid which dropped him to last place and charging through the field into 6th place before retiring with electrical problems after 20 laps.

=== 1986 season ===
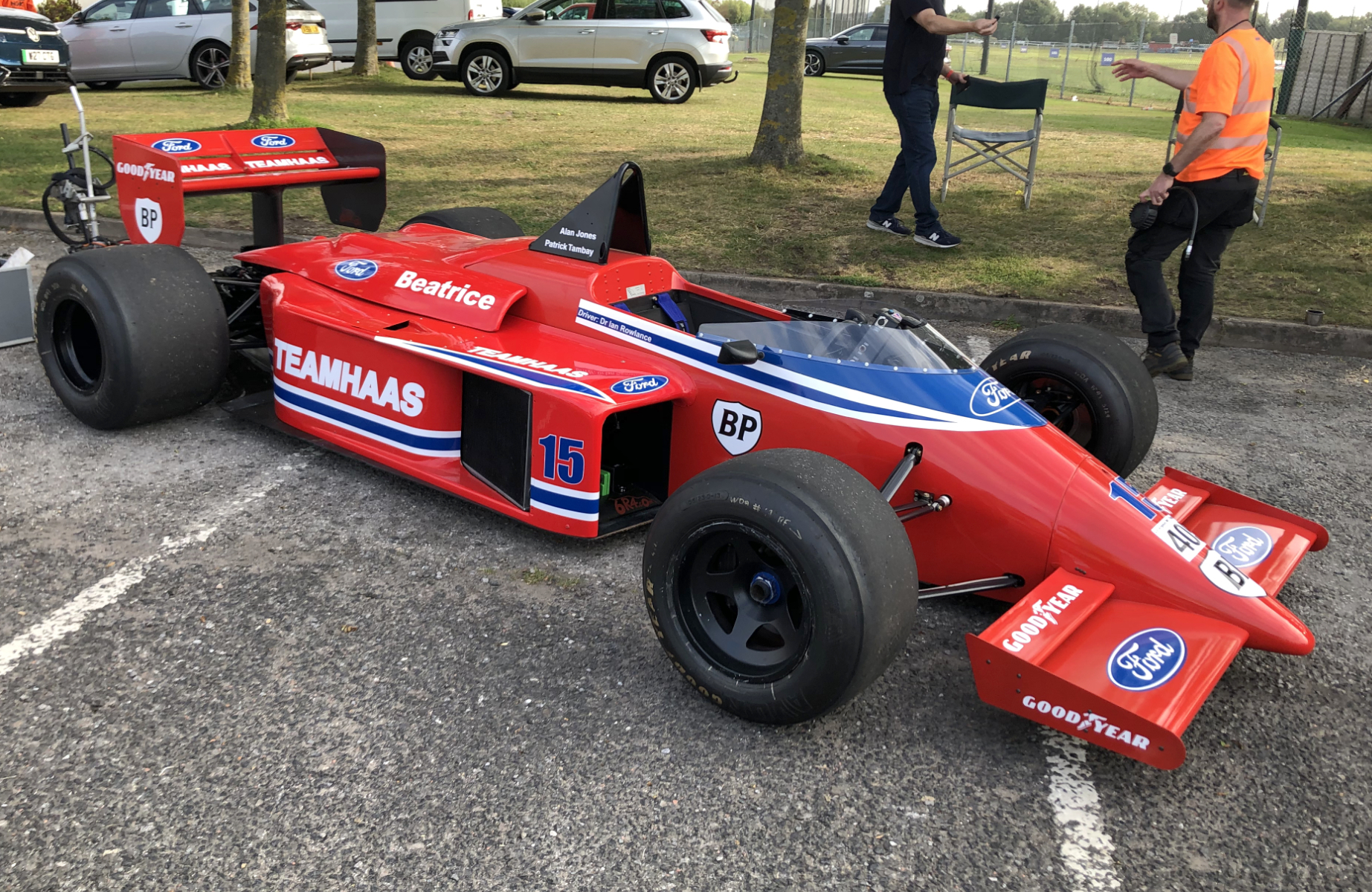
A Lola THL2, pictured at Aintree in 2025

After the team's experimental 1985 season, FORCE concentrated on developing the team's second car, the THL2, this time with the help of another promising designer, Adrian Newey (who had already worked at Fittipaldi in 1980); a car designed specifically for their contracted Ford engines. Frenchman Patrick Tambay, who had previously driven for Haas's Can-Am team in North America, was added as the team's second entry alongside Jones. Tambay had formerly won two Grands Prix for Ferrari in 1982 and 1983, and had also driven for the factory Renault team in 1984 and 1985 Problems arose however before the season began, as Cosworth's efforts to build the new Ford engines had been delayed, forcing the team to start the season with the previous year's car and the Hart engine. Even with the old machinery, Tambay was able to qualify 13th on the grid of the Brazilian Grand Prix, although he and Jones both retired. Tambay improved for the next round, the Spanish Grand Prix, as he finished the first race for the team, the last of eight cars to cross the finish line.

By the San Marino Grand Prix, the first THL2-Ford was completed for Jones, but was only able to qualify 21st in comparison to Tambay's eleventh in the THL1-Hart. Jones commented during qualifying that the THL2 was a great handling car, all that was needed was more horsepower from the new engine. Tambay received his first THL2 at Monaco and quickly qualified eighth with it, only to crash out of the race in the final eleven laps. Tambay was lucky when he crashed at Monaco that it was on one of the circuits many slow turns. His car rode the wheel of Martin Brundle's Tyrrell at Mirabeau and flipped over, hit the barrier and landed back down on its wheels. Another couple of feet higher and he would have cleared the barrier. Although still out qualified by Tambay, Jones was in position to finish his first race with the team in Belgium before his car ran out of fuel in the closing laps. Jones managed to see the finish of the Canadian Grand Prix, but his team mate was injured in a heavy crash during the warm-up.

American driver Eddie Cheever, who had previously driven for Ligier, Renault and Alfa Romeo, was driving for Tom Walkinshaw Racing Jaguar in the World Sportscar Championship, was signed by Haas as Tambay's temporary replacement for the Detroit Grand Prix after Carl Haas had difficulty in obtaining a superlicence for Michael Andretti (Andretti's father, 1978 World Champion Mario Andretti, at that time drove for Carl Haas in American Champ Car racing. Haas had originally wanted ex-World Champion Mario to drive in Detroit, but Mario declined and recommended his son instead). Cheever qualified tenth and ran high enough to possibly earn points, but retired with a broken wheel peg, four laps after Jones had also retired with steering problems. Tambay, recovered from his injuries, returned to the team at the 1986 French Grand Prix. Over the next two Grands Prix Tambay was in a position to finish before mechanical problems forced him to retire within the final fifteen laps of both races.

The German Grand Prix became another first for the team as both cars finished the race. Tambay, a lap down, was classified eighth while Jones was ninth and two laps down from the race winner. Tambay improved this performance with a seventh-place finish at the first Hungarian Grand Prix after having qualified the car in a season best of sixth on the grid. The tight and twisty Hungaroring, used for the first time in 1986, gave both Jones and Tambay a greater chance than at any time during the season with its emphasis on handling and acceleration. The improvements finally paid off at Austria as mechanical problems for many top teams allowed the two Haas entries to earn points towards the World Championship, even though both cars were two laps behind the winner. Jones finished in fourth, earning three points, just ahead of Tambay in fifth, who was awarded two points. At the team's first anniversary of their entry into Formula One, Jones earned a further point for a sixth-place finish at the Italian Grand Prix at Monza.

Problems began within the team however as a change in management in the autumn of 1985 at Beatrice led to them to decrease their sponsorship of Haas during the 1986 season. The team began to struggle for results as the money supply dwindled. Tambay finished the Portuguese Grand Prix, but did not complete enough laps to be classified in the results. Both drivers retired in Mexico, while the team ended the year in Australia with Alan Jones's Ford motor failing after 16 laps, and Tambay finishing the race 12 laps behind and once again not classified. During the Australian Grand Prix, Tambay's car was one of two in the race carrying an onboard camera, the other being the Lotus-Renault of Johnny Dumfries.

With a total of four points, Alan Jones was 12th in the Drivers Championship, while Tambay was 15th with two points. As the team's designated constructor, Lola received a total of six points, earning them eighth in the Constructors Championship.

=== 1987 plans and demise ===
Shortly after the end of the 1986 season, Carl Haas was continuing to try to find funding to continue into the 1987 season after Beatrice had opted to not return. The team still had a deal for Ford engines, but after being unable to find the sponsorship necessary, Carl Haas closed the team by the end of October, and the FORCE base was sold to Bernie Ecclestone, then owner of Brabham. The team was dismantled, with Haas and Mayer returning to the United States and Oatley moving on to design for McLaren. Jones and Tambay both left Formula One after their contracts ended, moving onto other categories of motorsport. The turbocharged Ford engines were used by Benetton in the 1987 season and that team continued as Ford's de facto factory team until the end of 1994. The former FORCE factory was retained by Ecclestone for use by Alfa Romeo in building several racing cars before it was sold to March Engineering in 1989, where it built Ralts and March IndyCars.

Lola meanwhile had their own plans for 1987, building a Formula One car (the V8 Ford-Cosworth powered Lola LC87) for the new Larrousse & Calmels team. Unlike the Haas Lolas, these cars were designed and built by Lola themselves at their factory, making them the first Lolas in Formula One since the company built chassis for Embassy Hill in 1975.

== Complete Formula One results ==
(key) (results in bold indicate pole position)

| Year | Chassis | Engine(s) | Tyres | Drivers | 1 | 2 | 3 | 4 | 5 | 6 | 7 | 8 | 9 | 10 | 11 | 12 | 13 | 14 | 15 | 16 | Points | WCC |
|---|---|---|---|---|---|---|---|---|---|---|---|---|---|---|---|---|---|---|---|---|---|---|
| 1985 | Lola THL1 | Hart 415T I4 (t/c) | G | | BRA | POR | SMR | MON | CAN | DET | FRA | GBR | GER | AUT | NED | ITA | BEL | EUR | RSA | AUS | 0 | NC |
| 1985 | Lola THL1 | Hart 415T I4 (t/c) | G | (Australia) Alan Jones | | | | | | | | | | | | Ret | | Ret | DNS | Ret | 0 | NC |
| 1986 | Lola THL1 | Hart 415T I4 (t/c) | G | | BRA | ESP | SMR | MON | BEL | CAN | DET | FRA | GBR | GER | HUN | AUT | ITA | POR | MEX | AUS | 0 | NC |
| 1986 | Lola THL1 | Hart 415T I4 (t/c) | G | (Australia) Alan Jones | Ret | Ret | | | | | | | | | | | | | | | 0 | NC |
| 1986 | Lola THL1 | Hart 415T I4 (t/c) | G | (France) Patrick Tambay | Ret | 8 | Ret | | | | | | | | | | | | | | 0 | NC |
| 1986 | Lola THL2 | Ford TEC V6 (t/c) | G | (Australia) Alan Jones | | | Ret | Ret | 11 | 10 | Ret | Ret | Ret | 9 | Ret | 4 | 6 | Ret | Ret | Ret | 6 | 8th |
| 1986 | Lola THL2 | Ford TEC V6 (t/c) | G | (France) Patrick Tambay | | | | Ret | Ret | DNS | | Ret | Ret | 8 | 7 | 5 | Ret | NC | Ret | NC | 6 | 8th |
| 1986 | Lola THL2 | Ford TEC V6 (t/c) | G | (United States) Eddie Cheever | | | | | | | Ret | | | | | | | | | | 6 | 8th |

== See also ==
- Carl A. Haas Motorsports
- Newman/Haas Racing
