= 1985 Belgian Grand Prix =

- Race 13 of 16 in the 1985 Formula One World Championship
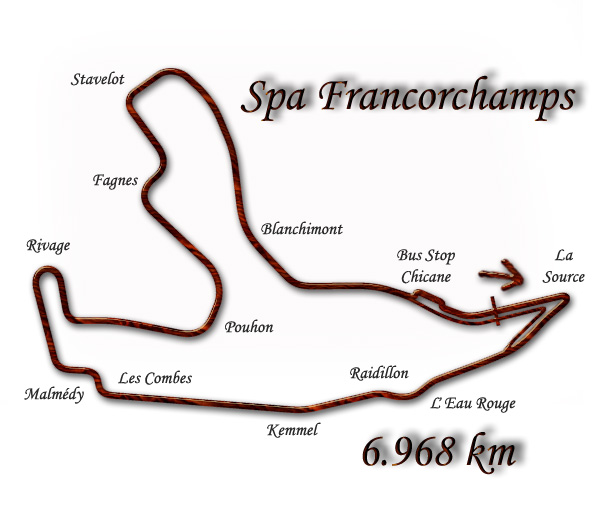

Race details
- Date: 15 September 1985
- Location: Circuit de Spa-Francorchamps; Francorchamps, Wallonia, Belgium
- Course: Permanent racing facility
- Course length: 6.940 km (4.312 miles)
- Distance: 43 laps, 301.172 km (187.136 miles)
- Weather: Wet/Dry, drying up in later stages

Pole position
Driver	(France) Alain Prost	McLaren-TAG
- Time: 1:55.306

Fastest lap
Driver	(France) Alain Prost	McLaren-TAG
- Time: 2:01.730 on lap 38

Podium
First	(Brazil) Ayrton Senna	Lotus-Renault
Second	(United Kingdom) Nigel Mansell	Williams-Honda
Third	(France) Alain Prost	McLaren-TAG

The 1985 Belgian Grand Prix was a Formula One motor race held at Spa-Francorchamps on 15 September 1985. It was the thirteenth round of the 1985 FIA Formula One World Championship. The race was the 43rd Belgian Grand Prix, the 31st to be held at Spa and the second since the circuit had been rebuilt and re-opened at half its original length in 1979. The race was held over 43 laps of the seven kilometre circuit for a total race distance of 301 kilometres.

The race was won by Brazilian driver Ayrton Senna driving a Lotus 97T. It was Senna's second World Championship victory and the first of five he would win at Spa-Francorchamps. Senna won by 28 seconds over British driver Nigel Mansell driving a Williams FW10. Third was World Championship points leader, French driver Alain Prost driving a McLaren MP4/2B. The win promoted Senna to third in the drivers' standings and third place allowed Prost to expand his lead over Ferrari driver Michele Alboreto to 16 points.

Originally scheduled to take place on 2 June 1985, the Grand Prix was rescheduled for September after the recently resurfaced track became damaged during the race weekend.

== Race summary ==
=== Track surface and postponement ===
This was the second Belgian Grand Prix to occur at a reconfigured Circuit de Spa-Francorchamps, with the first being the 1983 race. Race organisers opted to resurface the track with a material called Stress Absorbing Membrane Interlayer that intended to provide improved grip in wet-weather conditions at a cost of £3 million. Fédération Internationale du Sport Automobile (FISA), the governing body of Formula One, was queried about the resurfacing work and replied it would approve if race organisers complied with a regulation that mandates any such work occur 60 days beforehand. Local bureaucracy and a harsh winter caused delays to the work, which were reportedly finished ten days before the event's scheduled date of 31 May, and forced a cancellation of a pre-race test session at the circuit. Organisers did not refer the incident to the Fédération Internationale de l'Automobile and went ahead.

Warm weather, the powerful turbocharged cars of the time, and their wide, slick tyres, damaged the track during the Friday practice session. Repairs to the circuit were conducted overnight and undamaged turns were also addressed. After around 25 minutes into the Saturday practice session, all on-track activity stopped, since drivers noticed the damage and held a series of meetings. One suggestion was to cancel the remainder of the day's activities, the Sunday morning warm-up session and enter straight into the race on Sunday afternoon. Bernie Ecclestone, the commercial rights holder of Formula One, called every team principal to a meeting and told them to hold the International Formula 3000 support round on Sunday afternoon or it be the primary event. Drivers and officials inspected the track at 18:00 local time. Discussions continued until 19:30 local time and drivers' representative Niki Lauda told the media that the Formula One race would be postponed.

Jean-Marie Balestre, the president of FISA, was furious and summoned race organisers to the FISA executive meeting in Paris "to explain the serious fault committed," and said that they "will be liable to very heavy sanctions." The Belgian ASN was fined $10,000 and a provisional $100,000 bond to be deposited to FISA by the organisers would be returned in the event there were no further problems with the track on the rescheduled date. Ecclestone rescheduled the race to 15 September, following the Italian Grand Prix at the Autodromo Nazionale di Monza and the European Grand Prix at Brands Hatch. The race at Brands Hatch was later moved back by one week to provide the teams with some preparation.

=== Postponed race ===
Because this was a rescheduled race Formula One's newest team Haas Lola and their driver, 1980 World Champion Alan Jones, who had their first race at the previous round in Italy were not permitted to enter as they were not on the original entry list. During the buildup to the race FISA president Jean-Marie Balestre announced that the controversial South African Grand Prix would take place despite pressure to cancel the event as part of anti-apartheid embargoes.

Missing from the grid was an injured Niki Lauda. At the end of Friday's practice session before qualifying proper, his McLaren MP4/2B's throttle stuck open while he was only touring back to the pits. The car slid off the track on the newer section of track and the three time and defending World Champion hit a guardrail and on impact the steering wheel whipped around wrenching his wrist as it did so. X-rays revealed no break but Lauda was not fit to race so he returned home to Austria for further inspection and treatment from his physical therapist Willi Dungl. McLaren initially hoped to put John Watson in Lauda's car but this would have required the approval of all other teams. Mindful of the Constructors' Championship, Ferrari refused to agree, leaving Alain Prost as McLaren's only driver in Belgium. RAM was also down to one car, only bringing a single RAM 03 for Philippe Alliot and the 1985 Formula 3000 champion Christian Danner made his world championship debut with Zakspeed.

Prost took pole position, averaging 135.929 mph (218.756 km/h) from Senna with Nelson Piquet qualifying third in his Brabham BT54, with Alboreto fourth in his Ferrari 156/85. Rain fell before the race leaving the grid to form on a damp track with wet-weather tyres for the first time since Senna won in Portugal. Senna won the start from Piquet but the Brabham spun at the first corner. Senna led from Prost, Mansell and the two Ferraris of Alboreto and Stefan Johansson. The Ferraris were soon out, from a broken clutch and engine respectively. Meanwhile Johansson retired after spinning off at the end of the Kemmel Straight on Lap 8. Prost dropped behind the two Williams FW10s as the field pitted for dry tyres. Late in the race rain fell again and Senna expanded his lead. Keke Rosberg dropped to fourth with a brief pit visit with a brake problem and they finished in that order. Fifth had been Thierry Boutsen until his Arrows A8 broke its gearbox. Piquet claimed fifth from Derek Warwick in a Renault RE60B, Warwick scored the last point for the original factory Renault team. Twelve cars finished the race, including for the first time a Minardi as Pierluigi Martini finished twelfth in his Minardi M185. A further two cars, Boutsen and the crashed Ligier JS25 of Jacques Laffite were also classified as finishers. Huub Rothengatter's Osella FA1G fell one lap short of being classified.

Although the marshals led the cars directly into the pits after finish, Ayrton Senna drove around them and took a lap of honour.

== Classification ==
=== Qualifying ===
==== Times recorded on Friday qualifying session before postponement (31 May 1985) ====
Pos	No	Driver	Constructor	Time
1	27	(Italy) Michele Alboreto	Ferrari	1:56.046
2	11	(Italy) Elio de Angelis	Lotus-Renault	1:56.273
3	12	(Brazil) Ayrton Senna	Lotus-Renault	1:56.473
4	15	(France) Patrick Tambay	Renault	1:56.586
5	28	(Sweden) Stefan Johansson	Ferrari	1:57.506
6	6	(Finland) Keke Rosberg	Williams-Honda	1:57.705
7	7	(Brazil) Nelson Piquet	Brabham-BMW	1:58.122
8	25	(Italy) Andrea de Cesaris	Ligier-Renault	1:58.302
9	17	(Austria) Gerhard Berger	Arrows-BMW	1:58.343
10	1	(Austria) Niki Lauda	McLaren-TAG	1:58.374
11	5	(United Kingdom) Nigel Mansell	Williams-Honda	1:58.658
12	18	(Belgium) Thierry Boutsen	Arrows-BMW	1:58.874
13	16	(United Kingdom) Derek Warwick	Renault	1:59.129
14	19	(Italy) Teo Fabi	Toleman-Hart	2:00.592
15	26	(France) Jacques Laffite	Ligier-Renault	2:00.729
16	23	(United States) Eddie Cheever	Alfa Romeo	2:00.782
17	22	(Italy) Riccardo Patrese	Alfa Romeo	2:01.396
18	8	(Switzerland) Marc Surer	Brabham-BMW	2:01.555
19	30	(United Kingdom) Jonathan Palmer	Zakspeed	2:04.990
20	4	(Germany) Stefan Bellof	Tyrrell-Renault	2:05.070
21	24	(Italy) Piercarlo Ghinzani	Osella-Alfa Romeo	2:05.088
22	3	(United Kingdom) Martin Brundle	Tyrrell-Renault	2:05.782
23	9	(Germany) Manfred Winkelhock	RAM-Hart	2:06.771
24	29	(Italy) Pierluigi Martini	Minardi-Motori Moderni	2:12.279
	2	(France) Alain Prost	McLaren-TAG	no time
	10	(France) Philippe Alliot	RAM-Hart	no time

==== Rescheduled qualifying (13 and 14 September 1985) ====
Pos	No	Driver	Constructor	Q1	Q2	Gap
1	2	(France) Alain Prost	McLaren-TAG	1:56.563	1:55.306	—
2	12	(Brazil) Ayrton Senna	Lotus-Renault	2:00.710	1:55.403	+0.097
3	7	(Brazil) Nelson Piquet	Brabham-BMW	1:56.643	1:55.648	+0.342
4	27	(Italy) Michele Alboreto	Ferrari	1:56.999	1:56.021	+0.715
5	28	(Sweden) Stefan Johansson	Ferrari	1:56.585	1:56.746	+1.279
6	18	(Belgium) Thierry Boutsen	Arrows-BMW	1:59.046	1:56.697	+1.391
7	5	(United Kingdom) Nigel Mansell	Williams-Honda	1:56.727	1:56.996	+1.421
8	17	(Austria) Gerhard Berger	Arrows-BMW	1:56.770		+1.464
9	11	(Italy) Elio de Angelis	Lotus-Renault	1:58.852	1:57.322	+2.016
10	6	(Finland) Keke Rosberg	Williams-Honda	1:57.582	1:57.465	+2.159
11	19	(Italy) Teo Fabi	Toleman-Hart	1:57.588	1:57.857	+2.282
12	8	(Switzerland) Marc Surer	Brabham-BMW	2:00.154	1:57.729	+2.423
13	15	(France) Patrick Tambay	Renault	1:58.105	1:59.335	+2.799
14	16	(United Kingdom) Derek Warwick	Renault	1:59.761	1:58.407	+3.101
15	22	(Italy) Riccardo Patrese	Alfa Romeo	1:59.703	1:58.414	+3.108
16	20	(Italy) Piercarlo Ghinzani	Toleman-Hart	1:58.820	1:58.706	+3.400
17	26	(France) Jacques Laffite	Ligier-Renault	2:01.745	1:58.933	+3.627
18	25	(France) Philippe Streiff	Ligier-Renault	2:00.599	1:59.245	+3.939
19	23	(United States) Eddie Cheever	Alfa Romeo	2:00.861	1:59.370	+4.064
20	9	(France) Philippe Alliot	RAM-Hart	1:59.626	1:59.755	+4.320
21	3	(United Kingdom) Martin Brundle	Tyrrell-Renault	2:00.950	2:01.364	+5.644
22	30	(West Germany) Christian Danner	Zakspeed	2:05.059	2:07.046	+9.753
23	24	(Netherlands) Huub Rothengatter	Osella-Alfa Romeo	2:06.083	2:05.776	+10.470
24	29	(Italy) Pierluigi Martini	Minardi-Motori Moderni	2:06.007	2:06.606	+10.701

=== Race ===
Pos	No	Driver	Constructor	Laps	Time/Retired	Grid	Points
1	12	(Brazil) Ayrton Senna	Lotus-Renault	43	1:34:19.893	2	9
2	5	(United Kingdom) Nigel Mansell	Williams-Honda	43	+ 28.422	7	6
3	2	(France) Alain Prost	McLaren-TAG	43	+ 55.109	1	4
4	6	(Finland) Keke Rosberg	Williams-Honda	43	+ 1:15.290	10	3
5	7	(Brazil) Nelson Piquet	Brabham-BMW	42	+ 1 lap	3	2
6	16	(United Kingdom) Derek Warwick	Renault	42	+ 1 lap	14	1
7	17	(Austria) Gerhard Berger	Arrows-BMW	42	+ 1 lap	8	
8	8	(Switzerland) Marc Surer	Brabham-BMW	42	+ 1 lap	12	
9	25	(France) Philippe Streiff	Ligier-Renault	42	+ 1 lap	18	
10	18	(Belgium) Thierry Boutsen	Arrows-BMW	40	Gearbox	6	
11	26	(France) Jacques Laffite	Ligier-Renault	38	Accident	17	
12	29	(Italy) Pierluigi Martini	Minardi-Motori Moderni	38	+ 5 laps	24	
13	3	(United Kingdom) Martin Brundle	Tyrrell-Renault	38	+ 5 laps	21	
NC	24	(Netherlands) Huub Rothengatter	Osella-Alfa Romeo	37	+ 6 laps	23	
Ret	22	(Italy) Riccardo Patrese	Alfa Romeo	31	Engine	15	
Ret	23	(United States) Eddie Cheever	Alfa Romeo	26	Gearbox	19	
Ret	15	(France) Patrick Tambay	Renault	24	Gearbox	13	
Ret	19	(Italy) Teo Fabi	Toleman-Hart	23	Throttle	11	
Ret	11	(Italy) Elio de Angelis	Lotus-Renault	17	Turbo	9	
Ret	30	(West Germany) Christian Danner	Zakspeed	16	Gearbox	22	
Ret	9	(France) Philippe Alliot	RAM-Hart	10	Accident	20	
Ret	28	(Sweden) Stefan Johansson	Ferrari	7	Spun off	5	
Ret	20	(Italy) Piercarlo Ghinzani	Toleman-Hart	7	Accident	16	
Ret	27	(Italy) Michele Alboreto	Ferrari	3	Clutch	4	
DNS	1	(Austria) Niki Lauda	McLaren-TAG		Driver injured		

== Championship standings after the race ==
Drivers' Championship standings

Pos	Driver	Points
1	(France) Alain Prost	69
2	(Italy) Michele Alboreto	53
3	(Brazil) Ayrton Senna	32
4	(Italy) Elio de Angelis	31
5	(Finland) Keke Rosberg	21

Constructors' Championship standings

Pos	Constructor	Points
1	(United Kingdom) McLaren-TAG	83
2	(Italy) Ferrari	77
3	(United Kingdom) Lotus-Renault	63
4	(United Kingdom) Williams-Honda	34
5	(United Kingdom) Brabham-BMW	26

- Note: Only the top five positions are included for both sets of standings.

Previous race: 1985 Italian Grand Prix	FIA Formula One World Championship; 1985 season	Next race: 1985 European Grand Prix
Previous race: 1984 Belgian Grand Prix	Belgian Grand Prix	Next race: 1986 Belgian Grand Prix
