= 1985 Italian Grand Prix =

- Race 12 of 16 in the 1985 Formula One World Championship
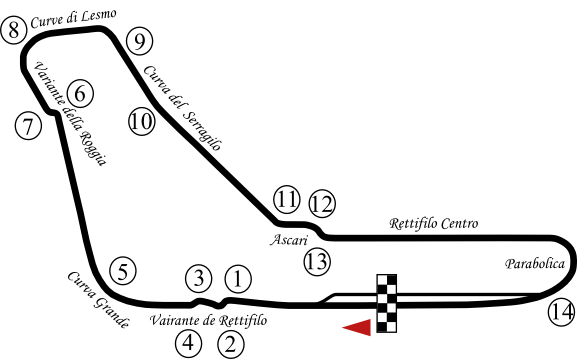

Race details
- Date: 8 September 1985
- Official name: LVI Gran Premio d'Italia
- Location: Autodromo Nazionale di Monza, Monza
- Course: Permanent racing facility
- Course length: 5.800 km (3.60 miles)
- Distance: 51 laps, 295.800 km (183.600 miles)
- Weather: Dry

Pole position
Driver	(Brazil) Ayrton Senna	Lotus-Renault
- Time: 1:25.084

Fastest lap
Driver	(United Kingdom) Nigel Mansell	Williams-Honda
- Time: 1:28.283 on lap 38

Podium
First	(France) Alain Prost	McLaren-TAG
Second	(Brazil) Nelson Piquet	Brabham-BMW
Third	(Brazil) Ayrton Senna	Lotus-Renault

The 1985 Italian Grand Prix was a Formula One motor race held at Monza on 8 September 1985. It was the twelfth round of the 1985 FIA Formula One World Championship. It was the 55th Italian Grand Prix and the 50th to be held at Monza. The race was held over 51 laps of the 5.8-kilometre circuit for a total race distance of 295.8 kilometres.

The race was won by Frenchman Alain Prost driving a McLaren MP4/2B. It was Prost's fifth and final victory of the 1985 season as he powered towards the first of his four Formula One world championships. Prost won by almost 52 seconds over the Brazilian duo Nelson Piquet (Brabham BT54) and Ayrton Senna (Lotus 97T).

It was the debut race for the American owned Haas Lola team with their new car, the Lola THL1 running the Hart 415T turbocharged engine, driven by Australia's 1980 World Champion Alan Jones. Jones, who had retired following the 1981 season, was making a full-time return to Formula One after two races, the US Grand Prix West, and the non championship Race of Champions with Arrows in early 1983.

Missing from the grid was popular West German driver Stefan Bellof who was killed a week earlier in a World Sportscar Championship race at the Spa Circuit in Belgium. With his funeral set for the day after the Italian Grand Prix the Tyrrell team only ran the one car for Martin Brundle feeling it would be disrespectful to Bellof to bring a driver in to replace him for the race. Members of the Tyrrell team, including team boss Ken Tyrrell, attended Bellof's funeral the next day.

Also missing were the West German Zakspeed team because their driver Jonathan Palmer had broken his leg when he also crashed his Porsche 956 at the 1000 km of Spa the weekend before, though Palmer's accident came in practice. With only a week until the Italian Grand Prix and no spare driver the team was forced to miss the race, but would return at the next round, the rescheduled Belgian Grand Prix with the 1985 Formula 3000 champion Christian Danner (also of West Germany) replacing Palmer.

Senna's pole position is often cited as one of his greatest moments.

== Classification ==
=== Qualifying ===
Pole position went to Ayrton Senna; his 5th pole of the year. His average speed was 152.487 mph (245.405 km/h).

Pos	No	Driver	Constructor	Q1	Q2	Gap
1	12	(Brazil) Ayrton Senna	Lotus-Renault	1:27.009	1:25.084	—
2	6	(Finland) Keke Rosberg	Williams-Honda	1:26.161	1:25.230	+0.146
3	5	(United Kingdom) Nigel Mansell	Williams-Honda	1:26.960	1:25.486	+0.402
4	7	(Brazil) Nelson Piquet	Brabham-BMW	1:25.679	1:25.584	+0.500
5	2	(France) Alain Prost	McLaren-TAG	1:27.576	1:25.790	+0.706
6	11	(Italy) Elio de Angelis	Lotus-Renault	1:27.098	1:26.044	+0.960
7	27	(Italy) Michele Alboreto	Ferrari	1:27.552	1:26.468	+1.384
8	15	(France) Patrick Tambay	Renault	1:28.578	1:27.020	+1.936
9	8	(Switzerland) Marc Surer	Brabham-BMW	1:27.799	1:27.153	+2.069
10	28	(Sweden) Stefan Johansson	Ferrari	1:29.001	1:27.473	+2.389
11	17	(Austria) Gerhard Berger	Arrows-BMW	1:27.746	1:27.723	+2.639
12	16	(United Kingdom) Derek Warwick	Renault	1:28.119	1:28.112	+3.028
13	22	(Italy) Riccardo Patrese	Alfa Romeo	1:29.068	1:28.340	+3.256
14	18	(Belgium) Thierry Boutsen	Arrows-BMW	1:28.369	1:28.760	+3.285
15	19	(Italy) Teo Fabi	Toleman-Hart	1:29.050	1:28.386	+3.302
16	1	(Austria) Niki Lauda	McLaren-TAG	1:28.472	1:28.949	+3.388
17	23	(United States) Eddie Cheever	Alfa Romeo	1:29.298	1:28.629	+3.545
18	3	(United Kingdom) Martin Brundle	Tyrrell-Renault	1:33.503	1:28.793	+3.709
19	25	(France) Philippe Streiff	Ligier-Renault	1:31.727	1:29.839	+4.755
20	26	(France) Jacques Laffite	Ligier-Renault	1:30.186	1:30.376	+5.102
21	20	(Italy) Piercarlo Ghinzani	Toleman-Hart	1:30.271	1:31.449	+5.187
22	24	(Netherlands) Huub Rothengatter	Osella-Alfa Romeo	1:33.529	1:37.664	+8.445
23	29	(Italy) Pierluigi Martini	Minardi-Motori Moderni	1:35.770	1:33.961	+8.877
24	10	(United Kingdom) Kenny Acheson	RAM-Hart	1:34.919	1:38.325	+9.835
25	33	(Australia) Alan Jones	Lola-Hart	1:34.943	1:45.823	+9.859
26	9	(France) Philippe Alliot	RAM-Hart	1:36.221	1:37.664	+11.137

=== Race ===
Pos	No	Driver	Constructor	Laps	Time/Retired	Grid	Points
1	2	(France) Alain Prost	McLaren-TAG	51	1:17:59.451	5	9
2	7	(Brazil) Nelson Piquet	Brabham-BMW	51	+ 51.635	4	6
3	12	(Brazil) Ayrton Senna	Lotus-Renault	51	+ 1:00.390	1	4
4	8	(Switzerland) Marc Surer	Brabham-BMW	51	+ 1:00.609	9	3
5	28	(Sweden) Stefan Johansson	Ferrari	50	+ 1 Lap	10	2
6	11	(Italy) Elio de Angelis	Lotus-Renault	50	+ 1 Lap	6	1
7	15	(France) Patrick Tambay	Renault	50	+ 1 Lap	8	
8	3	(United Kingdom) Martin Brundle	Tyrrell-Renault	50	+ 1 Lap	18	
9	18	(Belgium) Thierry Boutsen	Arrows-BMW	50	+ 1 Lap	14	
10	25	(France) Philippe Streiff	Ligier-Renault	49	+ 2 Laps	19	
11	5	(United Kingdom) Nigel Mansell	Williams-Honda	47	Engine	3	
12	19	(Italy) Teo Fabi	Toleman-Hart	47	+ 4 Laps	15	
13	27	(Italy) Michele Alboreto	Ferrari	45	Engine	7	
Ret	6	(Finland) Keke Rosberg	Williams-Honda	44	Engine	2	
Ret	26	(France) Jacques Laffite	Ligier-Renault	40	Engine	20	
Ret	1	(Austria) Niki Lauda	McLaren-TAG	33	Transmission	16	
Ret	22	(Italy) Riccardo Patrese	Alfa Romeo	31	Exhaust	13	
Ret	24	(Netherlands) Huub Rothengatter	Osella-Alfa Romeo	26	Engine	22	
Ret	9	(France) Philippe Alliot	RAM-Hart	19	Turbo	26	
Ret	17	(Austria) Gerhard Berger	Arrows-BMW	13	Engine	11	
Ret	16	(United Kingdom) Derek Warwick	Renault	9	Transmission	12	
Ret	33	(Australia) Alan Jones	Lola-Hart	6	Engine	25	
Ret	23	(United States) Eddie Cheever	Alfa Romeo	3	Engine	17	
Ret	10	(United Kingdom) Kenny Acheson	RAM-Hart	2	Clutch	24	
Ret	29	(Italy) Pierluigi Martini	Minardi-Motori Moderni	0	Fuel Pump	23	
DNS	20	(Italy) Piercarlo Ghinzani	Toleman-Hart	0	Non Starter		

== Championship standings after the race ==
Drivers' Championship standings

Pos	Driver	Points
1	(France) Alain Prost	65
2	(Italy) Michele Alboreto	53
3	(Italy) Elio de Angelis	31
4	(Brazil) Ayrton Senna	23
5	(Sweden) Stefan Johansson	21

Constructors' Championship standings

Pos	Constructor	Points
1	(United Kingdom) McLaren-TAG	79
2	(Italy) Ferrari	77
3	(United Kingdom) Lotus-Renault	54
4	(United Kingdom) Williams-Honda	25
5	(United Kingdom) Brabham-BMW	24

- Note: Only the top five positions are included for both sets of standings.

Previous race: 1985 Dutch Grand Prix	FIA Formula One World Championship; 1985 season	Next race: 1985 Belgian Grand Prix
Previous race: 1984 Italian Grand Prix	Italian Grand Prix	Next race: 1986 Italian Grand Prix
