= 1985 Formula One World Championship =

39th season of FIA Formula One motor racing

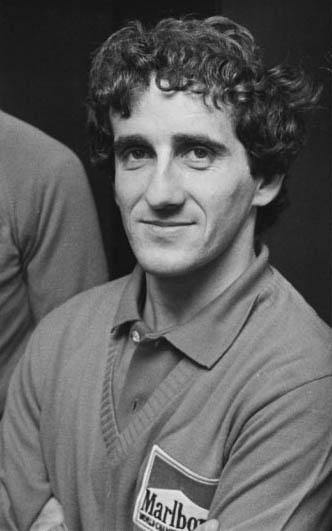
Alain Prost (pictured in 1984) won the first of his four Drivers' Championships by a 23-point margin.

Michele Alboreto (pictured in 1986) finished second for Ferrari.

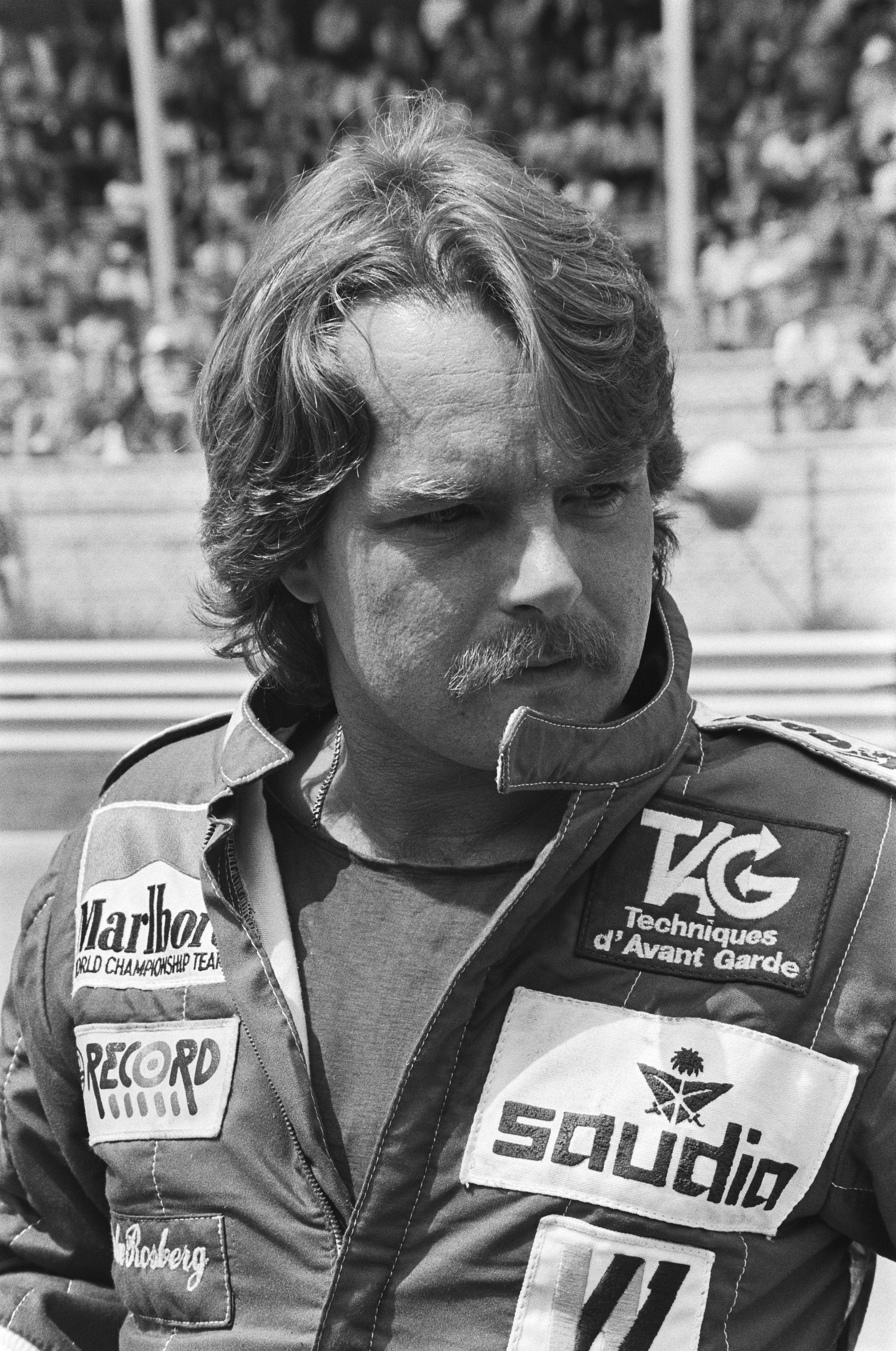
1982 Champion Keke Rosberg finished third, driving for Williams.

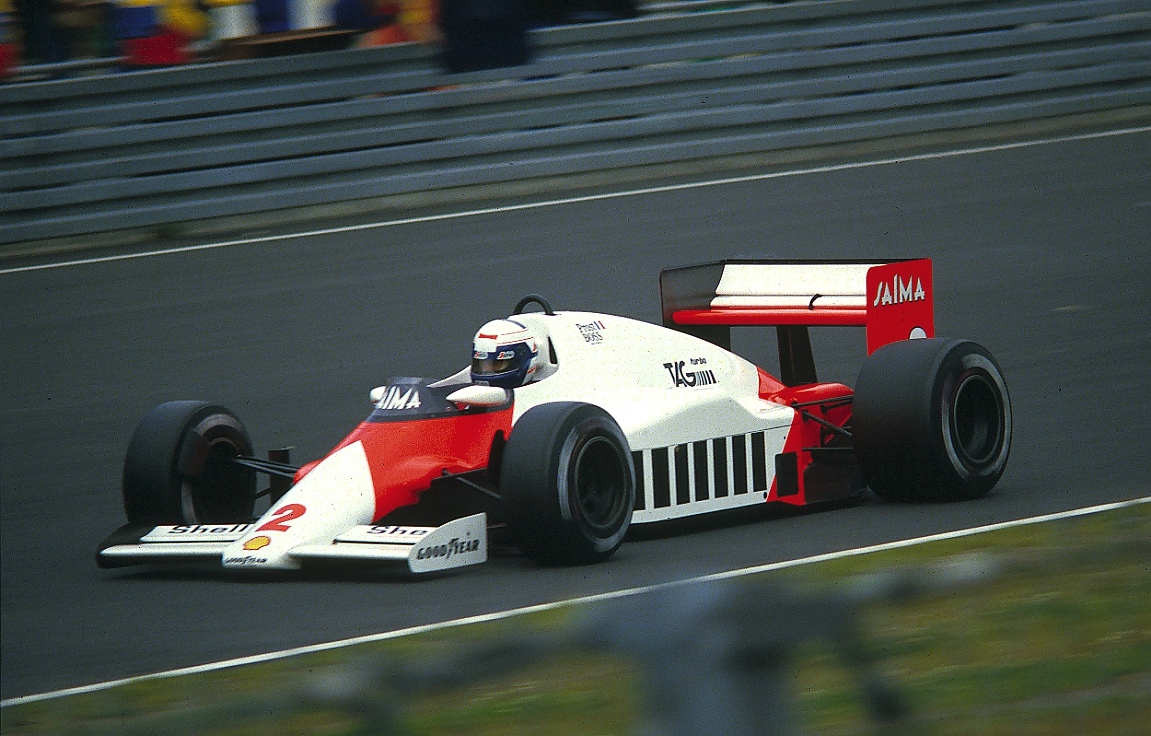
McLaren won the 1985 Constructors' Championship.

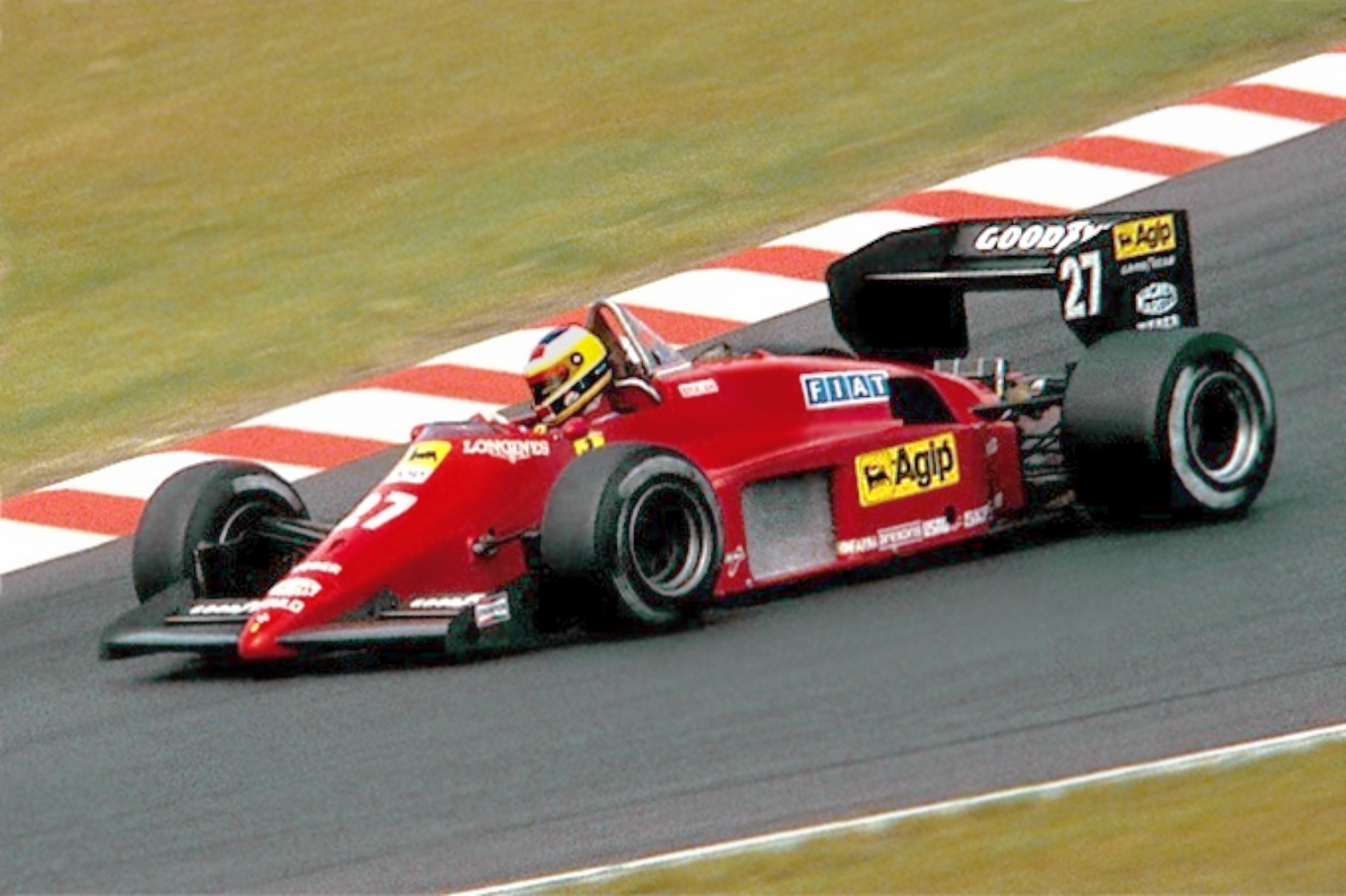
Ferrari placed 2nd in the 1985 Constructors' Championship.

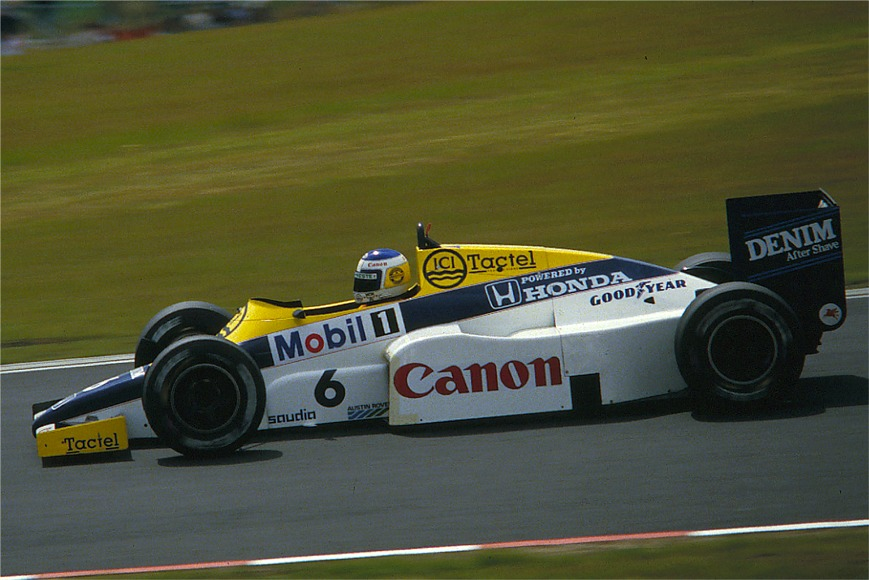
Williams finished 3rd in the 1985 Constructors' Championship.

The 1985 FIA Formula One World Championship was the 39th season of FIA Formula One motor racing. It featured the 1985 Formula One World Championship for Drivers and the 1985 Formula One World Championship for Manufacturers, both of which commenced on 7 April and ended on 3 November after sixteen races.

The Drivers' Championship was won by Alain Prost. After finishing two years as runner-up, both times winning more races than the champion, he was able to clinch the title this year sealing his success at the European Grand Prix. It would be first of four championships for "the Professor". Michele Alboreto was his main challenger, but he failed to score points in all of the last five races of the season.

The Constructors' Championship was won by McLaren for the second consecutive year.

Reigning champion Niki Lauda retired after this season, although team boss Ron Dennis tried to convince him otherwise.

The season was overshadowed by the fatal accident of Stefan Bellof, driving a Porsche 956B during the 1000 km of Spa World Sportscar Championship race.

After eight years, Michelin had withdrawn from the sport, leaving Pirelli and Goodyear as tyre suppliers for 1985.

== Drivers and constructors ==
Entrant	Constructor	Chassis	Engine	Tyres	No	Driver	Rounds
(United Kingdom) Marlboro McLaren TAG Turbo	McLaren-TAG	MP4/2B	TAG-Porsche TTE PO1 1.5 V6 t	G	1	(Austria) Niki Lauda	1–13, 15–16
(United Kingdom) Marlboro McLaren TAG Turbo	McLaren-TAG	MP4/2B	TAG-Porsche TTE PO1 1.5 V6 t	G	1	(United Kingdom) John Watson	14
(United Kingdom) Marlboro McLaren TAG Turbo	McLaren-TAG	MP4/2B	TAG-Porsche TTE PO1 1.5 V6 t	G	2	(France) Alain Prost	All
(United Kingdom) Tyrrell Team	Tyrrell-Ford	012	Ford-Cosworth DFY 3.0 V8	G	3	(United Kingdom) Martin Brundle	1–6
(United Kingdom) Tyrrell Team	Tyrrell-Ford	012	Ford-Cosworth DFY 3.0 V8	G	4	(Sweden) Stefan Johansson	1
(United Kingdom) Tyrrell Team	Tyrrell-Ford	012	Ford-Cosworth DFY 3.0 V8	G	4	(West Germany) Stefan Bellof	2–8
(United Kingdom) Tyrrell Team	Tyrrell-Ford	012	Ford-Cosworth DFY 3.0 V8	G	4	(United Kingdom) Martin Brundle	9–10
(United Kingdom) Tyrrell Team	Tyrrell-Renault	014	Renault EF4B 1.5 V6 t	G	3	(United Kingdom) Martin Brundle	7–8, 11–16
(United Kingdom) Tyrrell Team	Tyrrell-Renault	014	Renault EF4B 1.5 V6 t	G	3	(West Germany) Stefan Bellof	9–10
(United Kingdom) Tyrrell Team	Tyrrell-Renault	014	Renault EF4B 1.5 V6 t	G	4	(West Germany) Stefan Bellof	11
(United Kingdom) Tyrrell Team	Tyrrell-Renault	014	Renault EF4B 1.5 V6 t	G	4	(Italy) Ivan Capelli	14, 16
(United Kingdom) Tyrrell Team	Tyrrell-Renault	014	Renault EF4B 1.5 V6 t	G	4	(France) Philippe Streiff	15
(United Kingdom) Canon Williams Honda Team	Williams-Honda	FW10; FW10B	Honda RA164E 1.5 V6 t Honda RA165E 1.5 V6 t	G	5	(United Kingdom) Nigel Mansell	All
(United Kingdom) Canon Williams Honda Team	Williams-Honda	FW10; FW10B	Honda RA164E 1.5 V6 t Honda RA165E 1.5 V6 t	G	6	(Finland) Keke Rosberg	All
(United Kingdom) Olivetti Racing	Brabham-BMW	BT54	BMW M12/13 1.5 L4 t	P	7	(Brazil) Nelson Piquet	All
(United Kingdom) Olivetti Racing	Brabham-BMW	BT54	BMW M12/13 1.5 L4 t	P	8	(France) François Hesnault	1–4
(United Kingdom) Olivetti Racing	Brabham-BMW	BT54	BMW M12/13 1.5 L4 t	P	8	(Switzerland) Marc Surer	5–16
(United Kingdom) Skoal Bandit Formula 1 Team	RAM-Hart	03	Hart 415T 1.5 L4 t	P	9	(West Germany) Manfred Winkelhock	1–9
(United Kingdom) Skoal Bandit Formula 1 Team	RAM-Hart	03	Hart 415T 1.5 L4 t	P	9	(France) Philippe Alliot	10–14
(United Kingdom) Skoal Bandit Formula 1 Team	RAM-Hart	03	Hart 415T 1.5 L4 t	P	10	(France) Philippe Alliot	1–9
(United Kingdom) Skoal Bandit Formula 1 Team	RAM-Hart	03	Hart 415T 1.5 L4 t	P	10	(United Kingdom) Kenny Acheson	10–12
(United Kingdom) John Player Special Team Lotus	Lotus-Renault	97T	Renault EF4B 1.5 V6 t Renault EF15 1.5 V6 t	G	11	(Italy) Elio de Angelis	All
(United Kingdom) John Player Special Team Lotus	Lotus-Renault	97T	Renault EF4B 1.5 V6 t Renault EF15 1.5 V6 t	G	12	(Brazil) Ayrton Senna	All
(France) Équipe Renault Elf	Renault Elf	RE60; RE60B	Renault EF4B 1.5 V6 t Renault EF15 1.5 V6 t	G	14	(France) François Hesnault	9
(France) Équipe Renault Elf	Renault Elf	RE60; RE60B	Renault EF4B 1.5 V6 t Renault EF15 1.5 V6 t	G	15	(France) Patrick Tambay	1–14, 16
(France) Équipe Renault Elf	Renault Elf	RE60; RE60B	Renault EF4B 1.5 V6 t Renault EF15 1.5 V6 t	G	16	(United Kingdom) Derek Warwick	1–14, 16
(United Kingdom) Barclay Arrows BMW	Arrows-BMW	A8	BMW M12/13 1.5 L4 t	G	17	(Austria) Gerhard Berger	All
(United Kingdom) Barclay Arrows BMW	Arrows-BMW	A8	BMW M12/13 1.5 L4 t	G	18	(Belgium) Thierry Boutsen	All
(United Kingdom) United Colors of Benetton Toleman	Toleman-Hart	TG185	Hart 415T 1.5 L4 t	P	19	(Italy) Teo Fabi	4–16
(United Kingdom) United Colors of Benetton Toleman	Toleman-Hart	TG185	Hart 415T 1.5 L4 t	P	20	(Italy) Piercarlo Ghinzani	10–16
(United Kingdom) Spirit Enterprises Ltd.	Spirit-Hart	101D	Hart 415T 415T 1.5 L4 t	P	21	(Italy) Mauro Baldi	1–3
(Italy) Benetton Team Alfa Romeo	Alfa Romeo	185T; 184TB	Alfa Romeo 890T 1.5 V8 t	G	22	(Italy) Riccardo Patrese	All
(Italy) Benetton Team Alfa Romeo	Alfa Romeo	185T; 184TB	Alfa Romeo 890T 1.5 V8 t	G	23	(United States) Eddie Cheever	All
(Italy) Kelémata Osella	Osella-Alfa Romeo	FA1F; FA1G	Alfa Romeo 890T 1.5 V8 t	P	24	(Italy) Piercarlo Ghinzani	1–8
(Italy) Kelémata Osella	Osella-Alfa Romeo	FA1F; FA1G	Alfa Romeo 890T 1.5 V8 t	P	24	(Netherlands) Huub Rothengatter	9–16
(France) Équipe Ligier (France) Équipe Ligier Gitanes	Ligier-Renault	JS25	Renault EF4B 1.5 V6 t Renault EF15 1.5 V6 t	P	25	(Italy) Andrea de Cesaris	1–11
(France) Équipe Ligier (France) Équipe Ligier Gitanes	Ligier-Renault	JS25	Renault EF4B 1.5 V6 t Renault EF15 1.5 V6 t	P	25	(France) Philippe Streiff	12–14, 16
(France) Équipe Ligier (France) Équipe Ligier Gitanes	Ligier-Renault	JS25	Renault EF4B 1.5 V6 t Renault EF15 1.5 V6 t	P	26	(France) Jacques Laffite	1–14, 16
(Italy) Ferrari	Ferrari	156/85	Ferrari Tipo 031 1.5 V6 t	G	27	(Italy) Michele Alboreto	All
(Italy) Ferrari	Ferrari	156/85	Ferrari Tipo 031 1.5 V6 t	G	28	(France) René Arnoux	1
(Italy) Ferrari	Ferrari	156/85	Ferrari Tipo 031 1.5 V6 t	G	28	(Sweden) Stefan Johansson	2–16
(Italy) Minardi Team	Minardi-Ford	M185	Ford-Cosworth DFY 3.0 V8	P	29	(Italy) Pierluigi Martini	1–2
(Italy) Minardi Team	Minardi-Motori Moderni	M185	Motori Moderni Tipo 615-90 1.5 V6 t	P	29	(Italy) Pierluigi Martini	3–16
(West Germany) West Zakspeed Racing	Zakspeed	841	Zakspeed 1500/4 1.5 L4 t	G	30	(United Kingdom) Jonathan Palmer	2–4, 7–11
(West Germany) West Zakspeed Racing	Zakspeed	841	Zakspeed 1500/4 1.5 L4 t	G	30	(West Germany) Christian Danner	13–14
(United States) Team Haas (USA) Ltd.	Lola-Hart	THL1	Hart 415T 1.5 L4 t	G	33	(Australia) Alan Jones	12, 14–16

=== Team changes ===
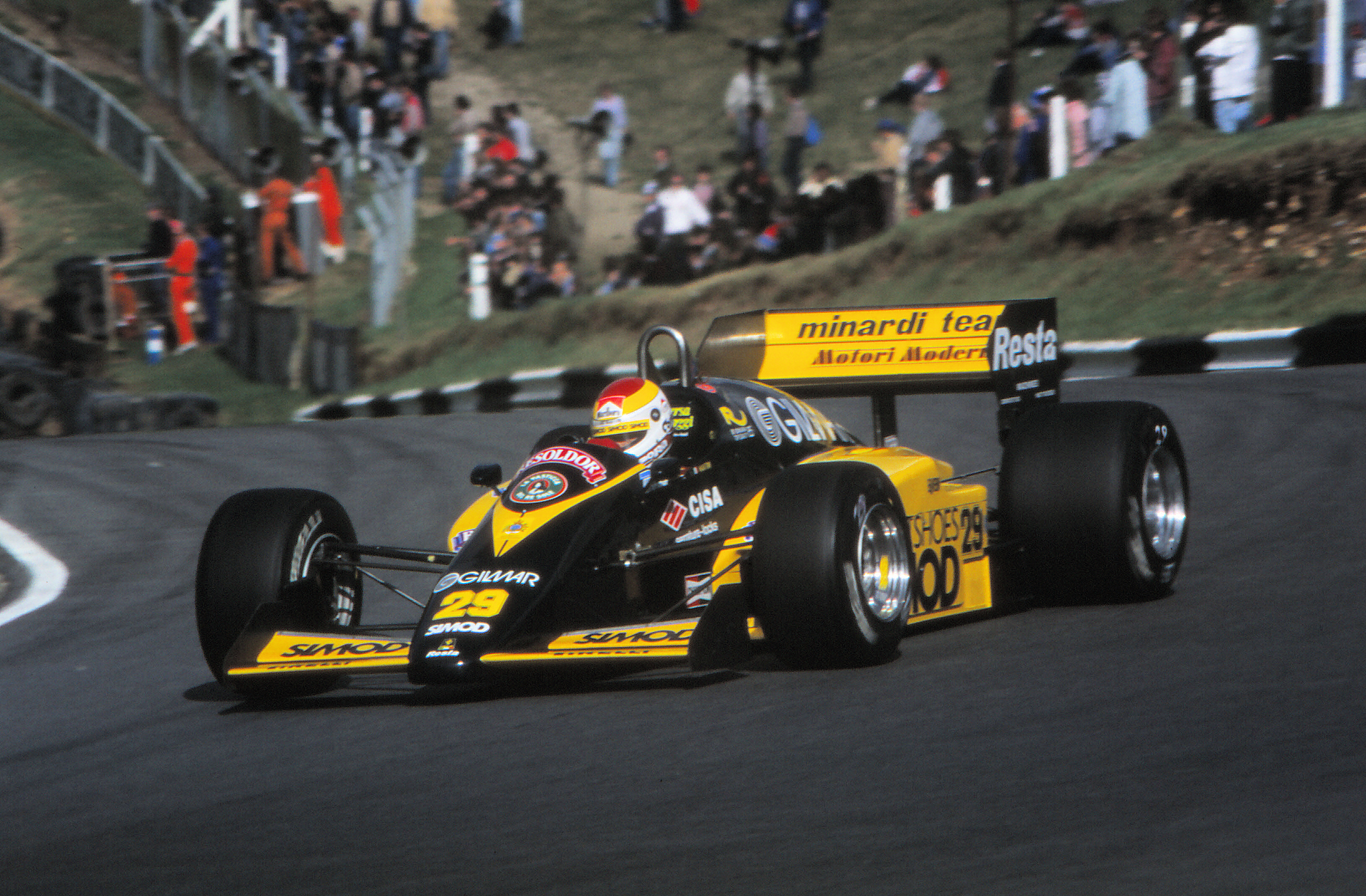
Minardi made its F1 debut this year.

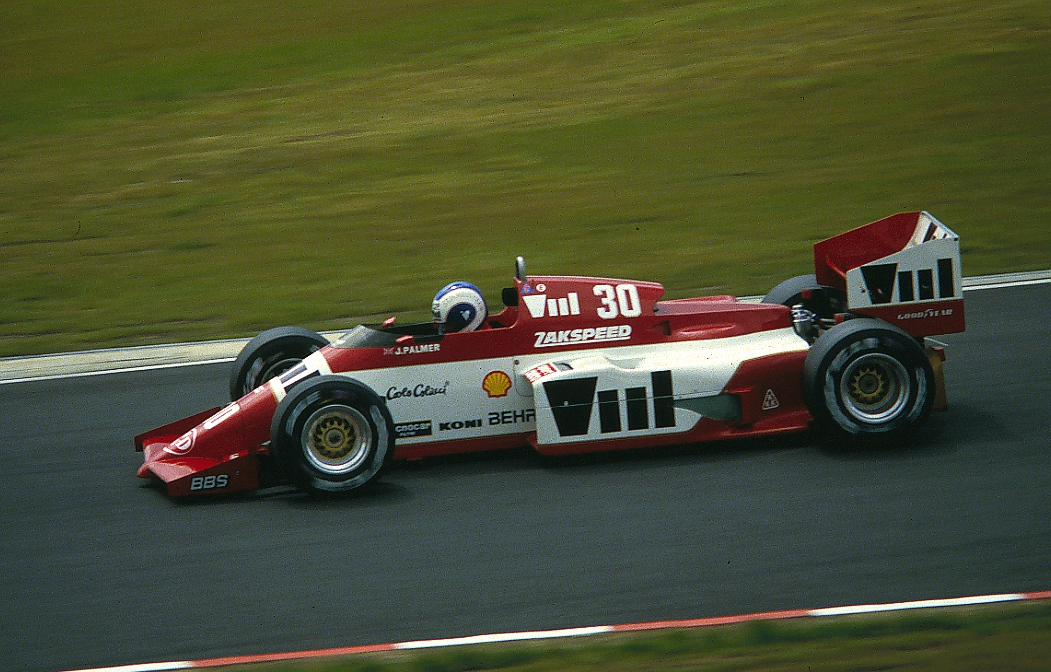
Zakspeed was the second new constructor for 1985.

- ATS had folded after the 1984 season.
- Minardi entered the sport as a constructor after four years of experience in Formula Two. They collaborated with ex-Alfa Romeo engineer Carlo Chiti to run Motori Moderni V6 turbo engines. When met with delays, Minardi had to convert their M185 chassis to accept off-the-rack Cosworth V8's.
- Zakspeed signed in as a constructor with their own engine - the 1500/4. They were only the fourth team on the grid to do so. They only entered the ten European and British rounds of the sixteen races on the calendar.

==== Mid-season changes ====
- After two races, Minardi could take delivery of the promised Motori Moderni engines and could revert their chassis back to the original design.
- Spirit folded after three races.
- Toleman could not get a supply of tyres after aggravating both Pirelli and Goodyear. It was only after the Spirit team folded that Toleman, with money from their sponsor Benetton, were able to purchase Pirelli tyres and start racing.
- Tyrrell switched from Ford-Cosworth V8's to Renault V6 turbo's after the Detroit Grand Prix, the last team on the grid to make the change.
- Haas Lola signed in for the 1985 season as the third new constructor of the year, but encountered delays in the development of their first car, and the specially designed Ford-Cosworth V6 turbo was not ready either. So their first chassis had to be thoroughly adjusted to be powered by a four-cylinder Hart turbo engine and could only make its debut in the Italian Grand Prix. It would not be until the third race of 1986 that the team could get delivery of the Cosworth engine and switch to their second car, specifically designed around it.
- RAM folded with two races left in the season.

=== Driver changes ===
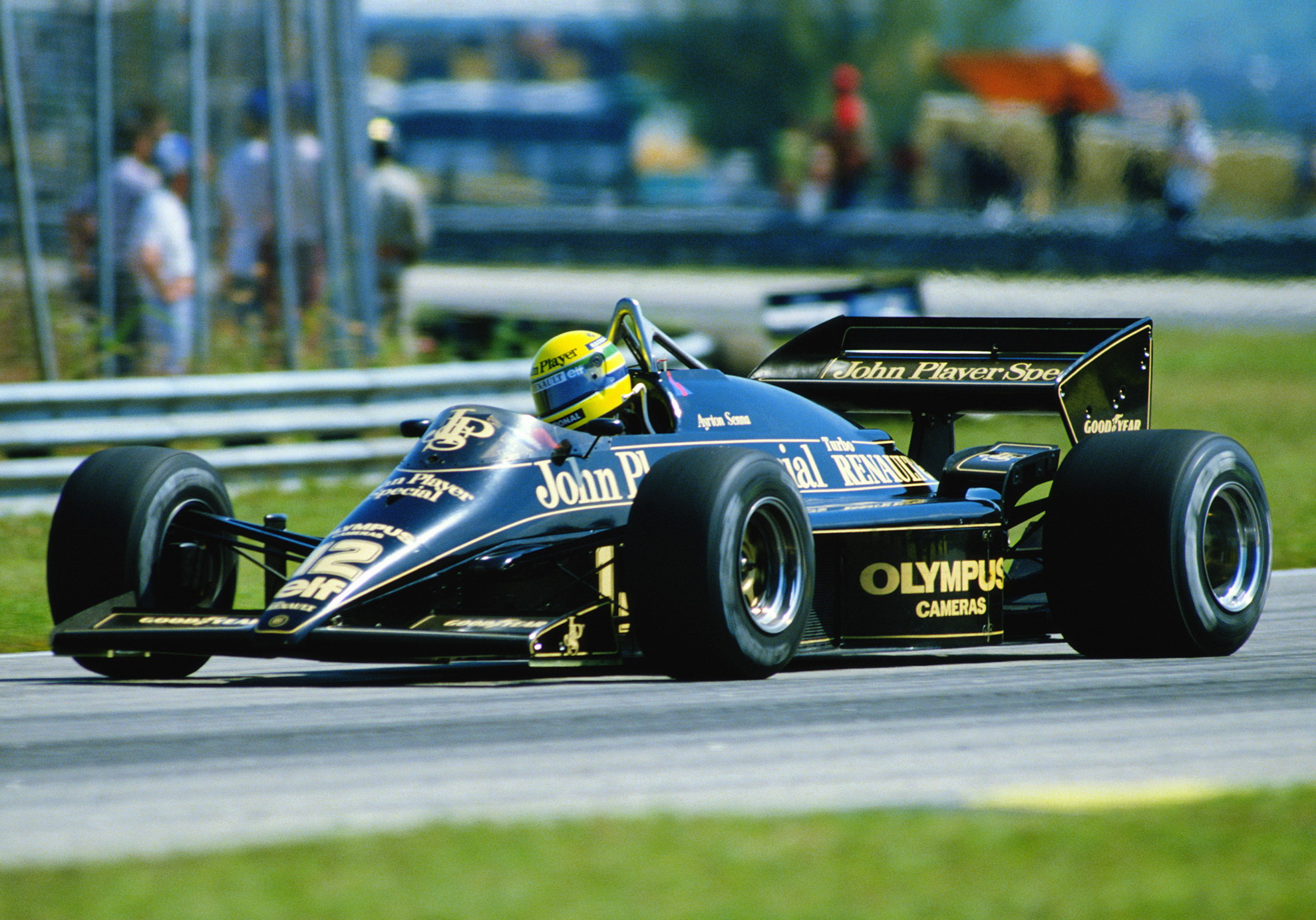
Ayrton Senna was signed by Lotus.

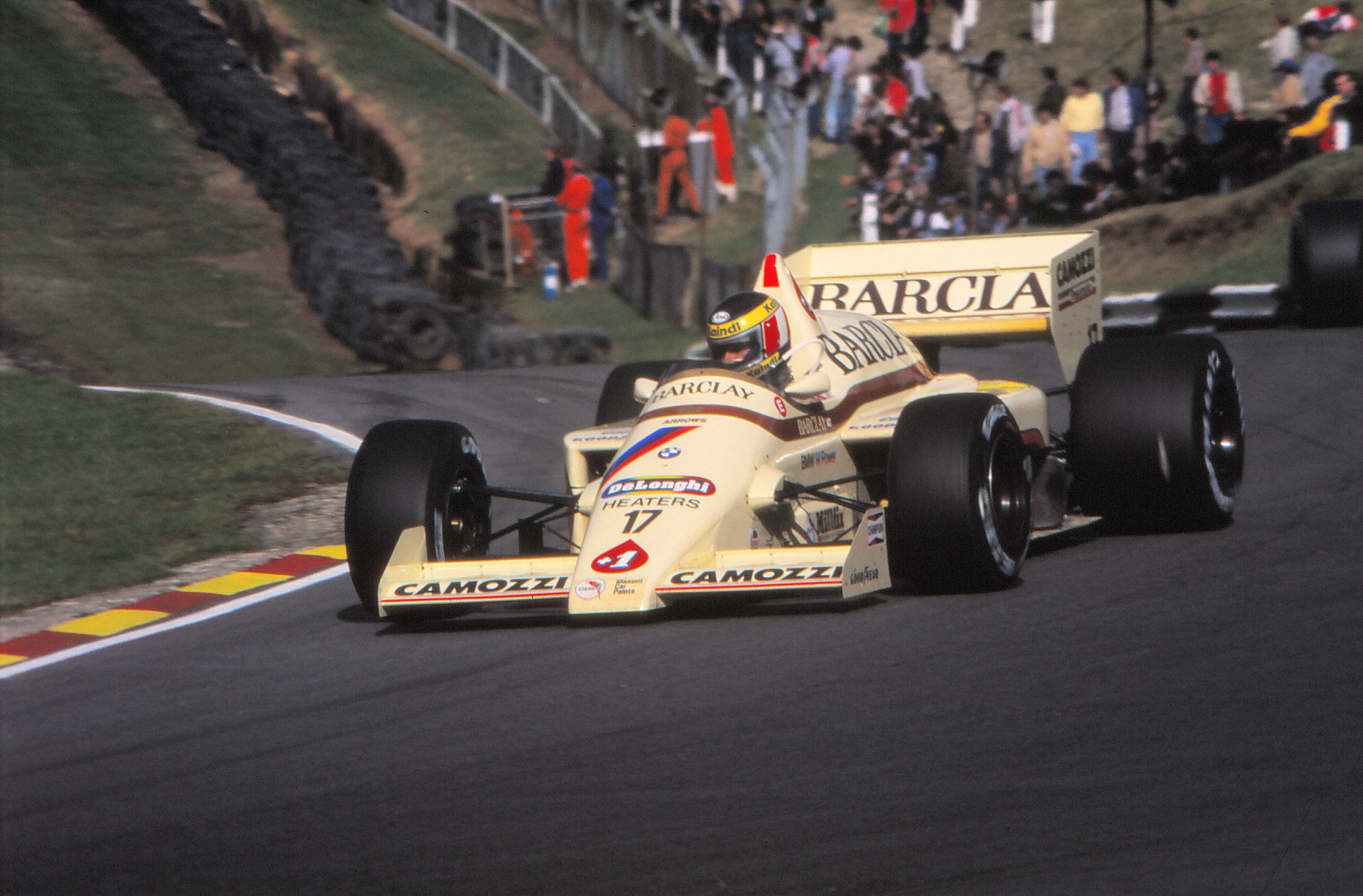
Gerhard Berger made his full-season debut with Arrows.

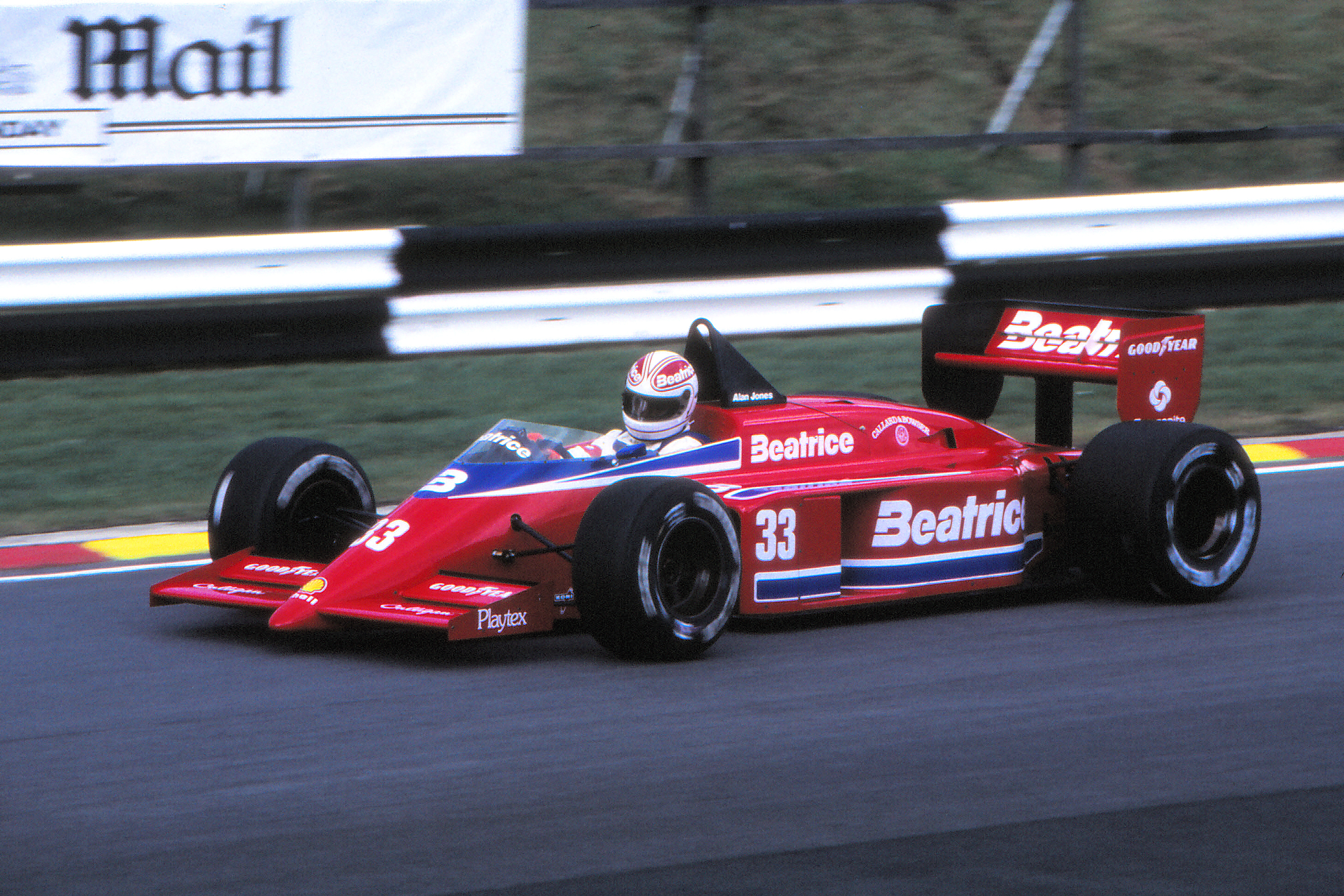
Veteran Alan Jones returned with newcomers Haas Lola.

- In an off-season with relatively little driver switches, biggest news was Ayrton Senna's promotion to Lotus. He would replace Nigel Mansell who was signed by Williams.
- Brabham hired François Hesnault from Equipe Ligier, where ex-Williams driver Jacques Laffite took his seat.
- Teo Fabi had driven 12 races for Brabham in 1984, but was dropped for 1985. He found a new home with Toleman.
- Gerhard Berger had made his debut in 1984 with ATS. After they folded, he was signed by Arrows for his first full season. Berger's ATS teammate Manfred Winkelhock moved to RAM. Ex-RAM driver Jonathan Palmer was signed by Zakspeed.
- After one weekend in 1984, when he filled in for Senna at Toleman, Pierluigi Martini made his full-season debut at Minardi. He would eventually spend eight out of his nine years in F1 with the Italian team.

==== Mid-season changes ====
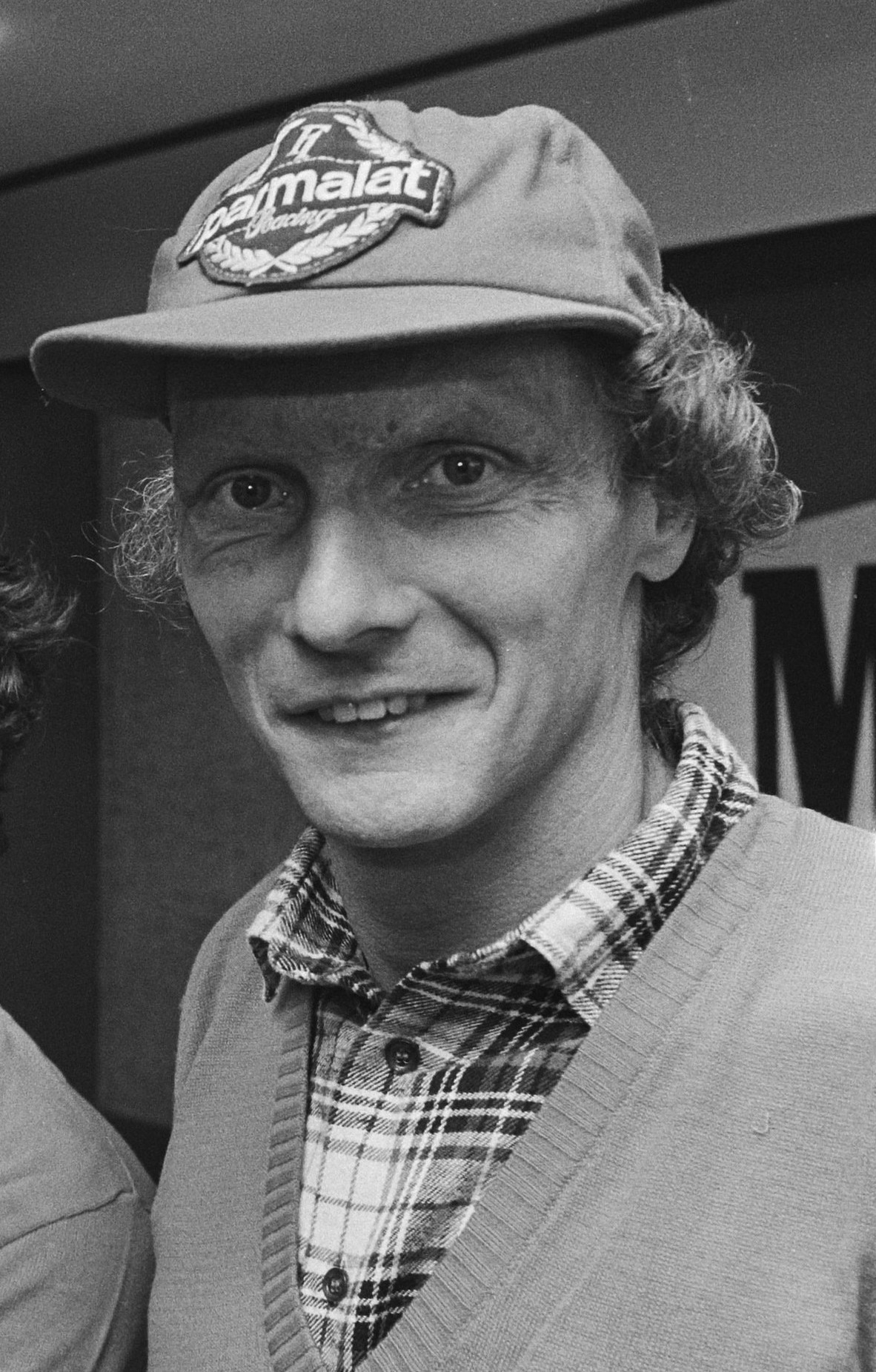
Three-time World Champion Niki Lauda (pictured in 1984) retired at the end of the season after a 13-year career.

- Stefan Johansson had signed with Toleman but pulled out of his contract amid the team's tyre woes. He substituted for Stefan Bellof at Tyrrell at the first race of the season and then moved to Ferrari when René Arnoux suddenly left. He ended staying with the Italian team until the end of 1986.
- After four disappointing results, François Hesnault was sacked from Brabham and replaced by Marc Surer. The Frenchman made one further appearance with Renault. As of 2024, this appearance for Renault in the German Grand Prix is the last time a Formula 1 team started three cars in a Grand Prix race.
- When Haas Lola made their long-awaited debut in the Italian Grand Prix, it was veteran driver Alan Jones behind the wheel. He would also drive for them during the whole 1986 season before retiring from the sport.
- RAM driver Manfred Winkelhock suffered a fatal accident during the Budweiser 1000 km World Sportscar Championship event. Ex-RAM driver Kenny Acheson took over the drive for three races before the team folded.
- Stefan Bellof was also racing in the World Sportscar Championship until he came together with Jacky Ickx in the 1000 km of Spa. Both drivers crashed and Bellof lost his life. At Tyrrell, Ivan Capelli and Philippe Streiff alternated as replacement drivers for the final three races of the season.
- Huub Rothengatter replaced Piercarlo Ghinzani at Osella midway through the season, when the Italian moved to Toleman.
- After Andrea de Cesaris crashed in the Austrian Grand Prix and rolled his car four times, team boss Guy Ligier's patience with the accident-prone Italian had run out and he replaced him with Philippe Streiff.
- Inaugural F3000 champion Christian Danner raced two weekends for Zakspeed instead of Jonathan Palmer. Palmer had been injured after a practice crash in the 1000 km of Spa, just a few days prior to Bellof's fatal accident.
- John Watson substituted for Niki Lauda at the European Grand Prix, after the Austrian had injured his wrist in qualifying for the previous race in Spa.

== Calendar ==
Round	Grand Prix	Circuit	Date
1	Brazilian Grand Prix	(Brazil) Autodromo Jacarepaguá, Rio de Janeiro	7 April
2	Portuguese Grand Prix	(Portugal) Autódromo do Estoril, Cascais	21 April
3	San Marino Grand Prix	(Italy) Autodromo Dino Ferrari, Imola	5 May
4	Monaco Grand Prix	Circuit de Monaco, Monte Carlo	19 May
5	Canadian Grand Prix	(Canada) Circuit Gilles Villeneuve, Montréal	16 June
6	Detroit Grand Prix	(United States) Detroit Street Circuit, Downtown Detroit, Michigan	23 June
7	French Grand Prix	(France) Circuit Paul Ricard, Le Castellet	7 July
8	British Grand Prix	(United Kingdom) Silverstone Circuit, Silverstone	21 July
9	German Grand Prix	(West Germany) Nürburgring, Nürburg	4 August
10	Austrian Grand Prix	(Austria) Österreichring, Spielberg	18 August
11	Dutch Grand Prix	(Netherlands) Circuit Park Zandvoort, Zandvoort	25 August
12	Italian Grand Prix	(Italy) Autodromo Nazionale di Monza, Monza	8 September
13	Belgian Grand Prix	(Belgium) Circuit de Spa-Francorchamps, Stavelot	15 September (Note: The Belgian Grand Prix was originally due to take place on 2 June, but was postponed to 15 September due to the effects of the track surface breaking up badly. This replaced the New York Grand Prix that was originally scheduled to take place a week later on September 22)
14	European Grand Prix	(United Kingdom) Brands Hatch, Kent	6 October (Note: The European Grand Prix was originally going to be held in EUR, Rome on 13 October, but it was moved from the original venue Rome to Brands Hatch for unknown reasons.) (Note: The European Grand Prix was on the original 1985 Formula One calendar on the date of 13 October to be held in EUR, Rome but was moved to Brands Hatch from Rome not to be confused with the Rome Grand Prix which is the long established race held in Vallelunga held from 1925 to 1991.)
15	South African Grand Prix	(South Africa) Kyalami Circuit, Midrand	19 October
16	Australian Grand Prix	(Australia) Adelaide Street Circuit, Adelaide	3 November

=== Calendar changes ===
- The Dallas Grand Prix was cancelled and did not return. This meant that, for the first time since 1975, there was just one race in the United States.
- From this year on, Circuit de Spa-Francorchamps would be the permanent home of the Belgian Grand Prix and Circuit Zolder would be cut out (under FISA's "one country, one circuit" rule) For the same reason, the French Grand Prix would be permanently held at Circuit Paul Ricard and Dijon-Prenois was dropped.
- The British Grand Prix was moved to Silverstone from Brands Hatch, in keeping with the event-sharing arrangement between the two circuits. Likewise, the German Grand Prix returned to the Nürburgring for the first time since 1976, and replacing the Hockenheimring. By FISA orders these agreements were suspended and, from 1987 on, Silverstone and Hockenheim would become the permanent hosts of the British and German Grands Prix. The Nürburgring would return in 1995, as European Grand Prix.
- The South African Grand Prix was moved back from April (in the 1984 season) to October. Likewise, the French Grand Prix was move back from May to July. The Portuguese Grand Prix was brought up from being the final round of the 1984 championship to be the second race in 1985.
- The Australian Grand Prix was added to the calendar for the first time, immediately getting the honor of closing the season.

==== Mid-season changes ====
- The Belgian Grand Prix was originally scheduled on 2 June, but during Friday practice, the asphalt broke up and overnight repairs were necessary. Half an hour into Saturday practice, all running was ceased and the race was canceled. The Grand Prix was postponed until 15 September and the track was thoroughly repaired in the meantime.

==== Provisional calendar ====
Originally, the 1985 calendar had a record number of 21 Grands Prix (2 more than the previous record in 1977).

- The Brazilian Grand Prix was due to take place on 10 March, with the Dallas Grand Prix as the second round on 24 March. However, the Texas race was cancelled because of financial problems, safety and organisational concerns.
- The Japanese Grand Prix was due to return after eight years and was scheduled for 7 April. However, it was cancelled as the rebuilding of parts of the Suzuka Circuit was delayed. It would last another two years for the race to be held at Suzuka.
- A final attempt to put on a Grand Prix in New York City was scheduled for 22 September, but the race was cancelled for the third year in a row.
- Then, the Hungarian Grand Prix at the Népliget Park Circuit appeared on a provisional calendar to be held on 22 September, but was cancelled, as plans for a race in the park were difficult to achieve and the decision was made to build a new circuit: the Hungaroring in Mogyoród outside the city of Budapest would have its first race in 1986.
- The European Grand Prix was going to be held in the Esposizione Universale Roma (EUR) district in Rome on 13 October, but it was moved to Brands Hatch and held one week earlier.
- The Spanish Grand Prix at a new circuit in Fuengirola appeared on a provisional calendar and was cancelled for the second year in a row, this time due to organisational problems. In the end a decision was made to build a new circuit in Jerez where the race would be held from 1986.
- The Mexican Grand Prix, originally to be held at Autódromo Hermanos Rodríguez on 17 November as the final round was cancelled after the 1985 Mexico City earthquake destroyed much of the Mexican capital.

== Regulation changes ==
=== Technical regulations ===
The rear wings became narrower to produce less aerodynamic drag, and all chassis would now have to pass a frontal crash test before the manufacturer was eligible to enter it for a Grand Prix.

=== Sporting regulations ===
From this season on, the FIA required that teams enter no more than two cars for a race. Renault did enter three cars for the German Grand Prix, so only two of their cars were eligible for championship points. The third car was driven by François Hesnault, who had an onboard camera mounted to the car, showing live pictures for the first time in Formula 1 history. This was the last time a team entered more than two cars.

== Season report ==
=== Race 1: Brazil ===
The first race of the season was the Brazilian Grand Prix in April, at the Autodromo De Jacarepagua in Rio de Janeiro. Michele Alboreto took pole in his Ferrari ahead of Keke Rosberg in a Williams-Honda and the two Lotuses of Ayrton Senna and Elio de Angelis. Rosberg retired with turbo failure, and McLaren-TAG/Porsche driver Alain Prost took 2nd after taking advantage of an accident involving Briton Nigel Mansell at the start. Prost chased Alboreto during the first half, unable to pass because of the Ferrari's superior straight-line speed. However, on the pit straight, Alboreto missed a gear, allowing Prost to take the lead and win the race from Alboreto and Elio de Angelis.

=== Race 2: Portugal ===
The 4½-month-long European tour started with the news that Ferrari driver René Arnoux had been sacked and replaced by Swede Stefan Johansson. No official explanation has ever been given by either Ferrari or Arnoux for the dismissal. The Portuguese Grand Prix was held at the Estoril Circuit near the capital of Lisbon. Although the practice sessions were held in good weather, it rained heavily for the race. Conditions were extremely difficult, and Ayrton Senna drove a race often regarded as one of Formula One's great wet-weather drives. He led the race from start to finish, and lapped everyone except 2nd-placed Alboreto on the way to his debut victory.

=== Race 3: San Marino (Imola, Italy) ===
The first of two Italian races was held at the fast Autodromo Dino Ferrari near Bologna. Ayrton Senna took pole again, and led until the final laps when his car ran out of fuel. The lead was taken by Stefan Johansson, who had started 15th and then dropped to 17th, but he too ran out of fuel after an electronics failure. Prost then took the lead, and barely made it over the finish line after having also run out of fuel. Prost was later disqualified for his car being underweight, and victory was handed to Elio de Angelis driving a Lotus-Renault.

=== Race 4: Monaco ===
The Monaco Grand Prix was originally supposed to be cancelled due to political wrangling, but it took place as scheduled. After pole-sitter Senna went out with engine problems, Alboreto took the lead, followed by Prost. Alboreto then slid on some oil at the first corner which had been dropped from the gearbox of Riccardo Patrese's Alfa Romeo after a collision with Nelson Piquet's Brabham-BMW. Prost took the lead after Alboreto's slip-up, but the Italian took the lead again from the Frenchman at the same place where he had gone off. However, another accident involving Patrese and Piquet caused more problems: Alboreto then punctured a tire, came into the pits to get his tires changed, dropping to 4th place behind Prost, and de Angelis and Andrea de Cesaris. He passed his fellow countrymen, but was not able to catch Prost, who won ahead of him and de Angelis.

=== Race 5: Canada ===
There was a 4-week gap between the Monaco and Canadian Grands Prix as the Belgian Grand Prix at Spa-Francorchamps was postponed until September, after the newly-laid track surface, to help deal with wet weather, melted due to the hot weather conditions. The Canadian Grand Prix at the Circuit Gilles Villeneuve in Montreal produced a Ferrari 1–2, with Alboreto winning ahead of Johansson, and Prost finishing third. It was Ferrari's first 1–2 since the 1983 Dutch Grand Prix and their last until the 1987 Australian Grand Prix.

=== Race 6: Detroit (USA) ===
The slowest and toughest race of the year was in the United States, at the angular Renaissance Center street circuit in the center of downtown Detroit, Michigan. Ayrton Senna took pole, 1.2 seconds ahead of the next fastest qualifier, Nigel Mansell. The Lotus combined with Senna's raw driving talent proved to be well-suited to slow tracks, and Senna decided to take a chance by using harder tires than the rest of the field and try to go a greater distance. The Detroit Grand Prix, classic for being a race of attrition was no different as Keke Rosberg passed Prost, Mansell and Senna to take the lead – a lead he kept to the finish on a circuit that, under the intense heat and humidity, broke up and made half the field retire. Prost, Mansell and Senna all crashed at the same corner at Atwater and St. Antoine Streets. Behind Rosberg were the two Ferraris of Johansson and Alboreto, the former pushing Rosberg hard for the lead.

=== Race 7: France ===
F1 returned to Europe to start the second European tour with the French Grand Prix at the very fast Circuit Paul Ricard with its long 1.1 mile Mistral straight. Keke Rosberg took pole position, averaging more than 140 mph. He was ahead of Senna, Alboreto, Prost and Nelson Piquet. The weather was hot, and after gaining places at the start, double world champion Piquet made the most of his BMW engine's superior power (this engine was the most powerful in F1 at the time) and Pirelli tires. After moving up to third at the start, Piquet passed Senna on the Mistral Straight, and then passed the leader Rosberg on Lap 11. Senna went into the pits and fell down the order; while driving hard to make up places he crashed heavily at the very fast Signes corner after the Mistral Straight when the Renault engine in his Lotus failed and dropped oil on the rear tires, and the car caught fire. Senna escaped uninjured. Rosberg had wrecked his tires early on, and was harried by Prost and his teammate, defending champion Niki Lauda. After a long battle where Rosberg held up the two McLarens and allowed Piquet to get away, Lauda retired with gearbox failure (the Austrian had only finished once in the season thus far), Prost eventually took Rosberg, who went into the pits to have his tires changed. Rosberg stormed after Prost, who was putting considerable pressure on Piquet. The Finn eventually passed Prost for 2nd, behind Piquet, in what was the 35th and last win of Brabham.

During qualifying, the turbocharged Brabham-BMW of Marc Surer reached a season-fastest 338 km/h (210 mph) on the Mistral Straight. This compared to the fastest (and only) non-turbo car, the Tyrrell-Ford V8 of Stefan Bellof who was recorded at 277 km/h (172 mph).

=== Race 8: Great Britain ===
F1 went to England for the British Grand Prix, this year being held at Silverstone, which was the fastest Grand Prix circuit in the world at the time. Rosberg outlined this by averaging 160.9 mph in qualifying – more than 7 mph faster than the pole time set for the 1983 British GP. Senna, after starting 4th, took the lead at the start. He led for most of the race distance, after Rosberg and others fell out with mechanical trouble. Prost had dropped back early on to save fuel, and then climbed through the field to catch Senna. Prost's McLaren was well suited to fast circuits, and he pressured Senna. In an effort to stay in front of Prost, Senna turned the Renault's engine's turbo boost up, and this caused him to run out of fuel and retire from the race. After that, Prost built a huge lead, and lapped the rest of the field, including Alboreto, who finished 2nd. The chequered flag was shown in error at the end of the 65th lap, ending the race one lap before its scheduled distance. Jacques Laffite, who finished in 3rd place, ran out of fuel on what was supposed to be the last lap, the error thus depriving 4th placed Nelson Piquet of a podium finish.

=== Race 9: Germany ===
The German Grand Prix 1985 was held at the Nürburgring instead of the Hockenheimring like in previous years, although instead of the historic Nordschleife being used, the new GP track was utilized for the second time in Formula 1 history after being the European Grand Prix in 1984. After Senna and Rosberg collided while being harried by Alboreto, Prost and Jacques Laffite in a Ligier-Renault, Alboreto in his Ferrari took advantage of a rare spin by Prost to take his last F1 victory. This event was the first occasion on which an onboard camera was used in a race; on François Hesnault's Renault car. That car was not eligible for championship points, and this race marked the last time that an F1 team entered more than two cars for a race.

=== Race 10: Austria ===
The extremely fast Österreichring was the venue for the Austrian Grand Prix, which was dominated by McLaren drivers Prost and Lauda. Prost took pole at an average speed of more than 155 mph (250 km/h). The McLaren car was superior to all the others on this track, and after Lauda fell out with turbo failure, Prost took victory ahead of Senna and Alboreto. Ligier-Renault driver Andrea de Cesaris crashed heavily after making a mistake and losing his car at the Texaco bends, but emerged unscathed, thanks to the grassy surface made soft by rain the night before. He was fired from the Ligier team soon afterwards.

=== Race 11: Netherlands ===
The beach-side Circuit Park Zandvoort near Amsterdam hosted the Dutch Grand Prix. After pole-sitter Piquet stalled at the start, Rosberg took the lead, but the McLarens were to show their high-speed circuit superiority once again: after Rosberg retired with engine failure, Prost took the lead, ahead of Senna and Lauda. Lauda eventually passed the Brazilian, and took the lead from Prost while the Frenchman was in the pits. With a car that was not entirely set up to his liking, Lauda won by a car's length from Prost, who drove very hard to catch the Austrian. This was the triple-world champion's 25th and last Grand Prix victory, and it was also the last Dutch Grand Prix for 36 years – the track owners went bankrupt, and the back side of the Zandvoort circuit past the Marlborobocht was sold to developers. The race would not return to the calendar again until 2021.

=== Race 12: Italy ===
The Italian Grand Prix at the very fast Autodromo Nazionale di Monza saw Williams-Honda driver Rosberg dominate the race, but he retired with engine failure, and Prost took victory, ahead of Brazilians Piquet and pole-sitter Senna.

=== Race 13: Belgium ===
The rescheduled Belgian Grand Prix returned to the Circuit de Spa-Francorchamps, a track relished by drivers, even in the wet. Niki Lauda crashed his McLaren in practice, and injured his wrist; he would not take part in this weekend or the upcoming European GP. Prost took pole ahead of Senna, but Senna took an immediate lead into La Source, ahead of Piquet and Prost. Piquet then spun, and Senna started to break away. The race began in wet conditions but later dried. After most of the drivers changed onto slick tires after the conditions were found to be too dry for wet tires, Senna led most of the race, but was challenged by Nigel Mansell most of the way. Senna won his 2nd GP from Mansell and Prost. Prost, the championship leader, now had a firm lead over his closest challenger Alboreto – if Prost gained more points in the next race, he would be Drivers' Champion. This would end up filling a gap in the calendar left by the cancellation for the third year in a row of the New York Grand Prix.

=== Race 14: Europe ===
The European Grand Prix was originally scheduled on the 1985 calendar to be held on a street circuit in Rome but for unknown reasons it was moved to the southern English Brands Hatch circuit, normally used for the British Grand Prix on even numbered years. Senna took his 6th pole position at an average speed of more than 140 mph (228 km/h). There had been some concerns about racing these very powerful cars at the small, very fast Brands Hatch circuit: Niki Lauda and a few other drivers felt the cars were too fast for a short circuit like Brands, and if the power of the engines increased over time, the circuit would have to be modified in order to accommodate the cars. Senna led from pole position and was followed by Rosberg. Going into Surtees, Rosberg tried to get past Senna, but Senna took his line forcefully and Rosberg spun to avoid contact. Piquet hit Rosberg and retired, but Rosberg was able to get to the pits and returned to the track right in front of Senna who was then being harried by Mansell. Rosberg then held Senna up whilst going into Surtees, which enabled Mansell to overtake into the lead. Mansell led the rest of the race distance, while Marc Surer in a Brabham-BMW got up to 2nd, but retired at Stirling's corner after a fire broke out on the back of his car. Meanwhile, Alboreto's car failed and caught fire; he drove it back to the Ferrari pit while still in flames. Prost dropped to 15th at the start, but finished in 4th, which was enough for him to become world Drivers' Champion for the first time. He finished behind Mansell, Senna, and Rosberg.

=== Race 15: South Africa ===
The South African Grand Prix, held at the very fast Kyalami circuit, had been a point of contention throughout the year: South Africa's Apartheid regime had declared a state of emergency, and controversy ensued throughout the year whether this race would take place or not. Governing body president Jean-Marie Balestre announced that the race would take place despite opposition from Renault and Ligier teams, who pulled out due to pressure from the French government. With only 20 cars starting, Nigel Mansell took pole at an average speed of 147 mph (235 km/h). Rosberg took the lead, but then went off on some oil at Crowthorne which had been dropped by Piercarlo Ghinzani's Toleman, whose Hart engine had failed. Mansell took the lead from Rosberg and held it until the end. Rosberg drove hard and caught 2nd-placed Prost before the finish, who ran out of fuel, but was still classified 3rd to make it a Williams 1–2; Williams was the third team this year to finish a race 1–2, the others being Ferrari and McLaren. A few days after the race, it was announced that the South African GP would be struck off the calendar for 1986. This race was the last World Championship Grand Prix where laurel wreaths were given to the drivers at the podium.

=== Race 16: Australia ===
The first ever world championship Australian Grand Prix was held on a street circuit in the city of Adelaide. Senna took his seventh pole position of the season by some margin on his superior-handling Lotus-Renault. However, he lost the lead to Lauda after a delayed pit stop. Lauda and Senna battled hard, and Senna eventually took the lead. Lauda crashed on the main straight due to brake failure in what was his last Grand Prix. Senna, retired with a misfiring engine, leaving Rosberg to win ahead of the two Ligier drivers Jacques Laffite and Phillippe Streiff, whom both crashed into each other on the main straight on the last lap.

== Results and standings ==
=== Grands Prix ===
Round	Grand Prix	Pole position	Fastest lap	Winning driver	Winning constructor	Report
1	(Brazil) Brazilian Grand Prix	(Italy) Michele Alboreto	(France) Alain Prost	(France) Alain Prost	(United Kingdom) McLaren-TAG	Report
2	(Portugal) Portuguese Grand Prix	(Brazil) Ayrton Senna	(Brazil) Ayrton Senna	(Brazil) Ayrton Senna	(United Kingdom) Lotus-Renault	Report
3	(Italy) San Marino Grand Prix	(Brazil) Ayrton Senna	(Italy) Michele Alboreto	(Italy) Elio de Angelis (Note: Alain Prost originally won the race, but was later disqualified due to an underweight car. Elio de Angelis, initially classified second, inherited the win.)	(United Kingdom) Lotus-Renault	Report
4	Monaco Grand Prix	(Brazil) Ayrton Senna	(Italy) Michele Alboreto	(France) Alain Prost	(United Kingdom) McLaren-TAG	Report
5	(Canada) Canadian Grand Prix	(Italy) Elio de Angelis	(Brazil) Ayrton Senna	(Italy) Michele Alboreto	(Italy) Ferrari	Report
6	(United States) Detroit Grand Prix	(Brazil) Ayrton Senna	(Brazil) Ayrton Senna	(Finland) Keke Rosberg	(United Kingdom) Williams-Honda	Report
7	(France) French Grand Prix	(Finland) Keke Rosberg	(Finland) Keke Rosberg	(Brazil) Nelson Piquet	(United Kingdom) Brabham-BMW	Report
8	(United Kingdom) British Grand Prix	(Finland) Keke Rosberg	(France) Alain Prost	(France) Alain Prost	(United Kingdom) McLaren-TAG	Report
9	(West Germany) German Grand Prix	(Italy) Teo Fabi	(Austria) Niki Lauda	(Italy) Michele Alboreto	(Italy) Ferrari	Report
10	(Austria) Austrian Grand Prix	(France) Alain Prost	(France) Alain Prost	(France) Alain Prost	(United Kingdom) McLaren-TAG	Report
11	(Netherlands) Dutch Grand Prix	(Brazil) Nelson Piquet	(France) Alain Prost	(Austria) Niki Lauda	(United Kingdom) McLaren-TAG	Report
12	(Italy) Italian Grand Prix	(Brazil) Ayrton Senna	(United Kingdom) Nigel Mansell	(France) Alain Prost	(United Kingdom) McLaren-TAG	Report
13	(Belgium) Belgian Grand Prix	(France) Alain Prost	(France) Alain Prost	(Brazil) Ayrton Senna	(United Kingdom) Lotus-Renault	Report
14	(United Kingdom) European Grand Prix	(Brazil) Ayrton Senna	(France) Jacques Laffite	(United Kingdom) Nigel Mansell	(United Kingdom) Williams-Honda	Report
15	(South Africa) South African Grand Prix	(United Kingdom) Nigel Mansell	(Finland) Keke Rosberg	(United Kingdom) Nigel Mansell	(United Kingdom) Williams-Honda	Report
16	(Australia) Australian Grand Prix	(Brazil) Ayrton Senna	(Finland) Keke Rosberg	(Finland) Keke Rosberg	(United Kingdom) Williams-Honda	Report

=== Scoring system ===
Points were awarded to the top six classified finishers. For the Drivers' Championship, the best eleven results were counted, while, for the Constructors' Championship, all rounds were counted.

Numbers without parentheses are championship points; numbers in parentheses are total points scored. Points were awarded in the following system:

Position	1st	2nd	3rd	4th	5th	6th
Race	9	6	4	3	2	1

=== World Drivers' Championship standings ===
Pos	Driver	BRA (Brazil)	POR (Portugal)	SMR (Italy)	MON (Monaco)	CAN (Canada)	DET (United States)	FRA (France)	GBR (United Kingdom)	GER (West Germany)	AUT (Austria)	NED (Netherlands)	ITA (Italy)	BEL (Belgium)	EUR (United Kingdom)	RSA (South Africa)	AUS (Australia)	Points
1	(France) Alain Prost	1^{F}	Ret	DSQ	1	3	Ret	3	1^{F}	2	1^{P}^{F}	2^{F}	1	3^{P}^{F}	(4)	3	Ret	73 (76)
2	(Italy) Michele Alboreto	2^{P}	2	Ret^{F}	2^{F}	1	3	Ret	2	1	3	4	13^{†}	Ret	Ret	Ret	Ret	53
3	(Finland) Keke Rosberg	Ret	Ret	Ret	8	4	1	2^{P}^{F}	Ret^{P}	12^{†}	Ret	Ret	Ret	4	3	2^{F}	1^{F}	40
4	(Brazil) Ayrton Senna	Ret	1^{P}^{F}	7^{P}^{†}	Ret^{P}	16^{F}	Ret^{P}^{F}	Ret	10^{†}	Ret	2	3	3^{P}	1	2^{P}	Ret	Ret^{P}	38
5	(Italy) Elio de Angelis	3	4	1	3	5^{P}	5	5	NC	Ret	5	5	6	Ret	5	Ret	DSQ	33
6	(United Kingdom) Nigel Mansell	Ret	5	5^{†}	7	6	Ret	DNS	Ret	6	Ret	6	11^{F}^{†}	2	1	1^{P}	Ret	31
7	(Sweden) Stefan Johansson	7	8	6^{†}	Ret	2	2	4	Ret	9	4	Ret	5	Ret	Ret	4	5	26
8	(Brazil) Nelson Piquet	Ret	Ret	8^{†}	Ret	Ret	6	1	4	Ret	Ret	8^{P}	2	5	Ret	Ret	Ret	21
9	(France) Jacques Laffite	6	Ret	Ret	6	8	12	Ret	3	3	Ret	Ret	Ret	11^{†}	Ret^{F}		2	16
10	(Austria) Niki Lauda	Ret	Ret	4	Ret	Ret	Ret	Ret	Ret	5^{F}	Ret	1	Ret	DNS		Ret	Ret	14
11	(Belgium) Thierry Boutsen	11	Ret	2^{†}	9	9	7	9	Ret	4	8	Ret	9	10	6	6	Ret	11
12	(France) Patrick Tambay	5	3	3	Ret	7	Ret	6	Ret	Ret	10^{†}	Ret	7	Ret	12		Ret	11
13	(Switzerland) Marc Surer					15	8	8^{†}	6	Ret	6	10^{†}	4	8	Ret	Ret	Ret	5
14	(United Kingdom) Derek Warwick	10	7	10	5	Ret	Ret	7	5	Ret	Ret	Ret	Ret	6	Ret		Ret	5
15	(France) Philippe Streiff												10	9	8	Ret	3	4
16	(West Germany) Stefan Bellof		6	Ret	DNQ	11	4	13	11	8	7^{†}	Ret						4
17	(Italy) Andrea de Cesaris	Ret	Ret	Ret	4	14	10	Ret	Ret	Ret	Ret	Ret						3
18	(France) René Arnoux	4																3
19	(Italy) Ivan Capelli														Ret		4	3
20	(Austria) Gerhard Berger	Ret	Ret	Ret	Ret	13	11	Ret	8	7	Ret	9	Ret	7	10	5	6	3
—	(United Kingdom) Martin Brundle	8	Ret	9^{†}	10	12	Ret	Ret	7	10	DNQ	7	8	13	Ret	7	NC	0
—	(Netherlands) Huub Rothengatter									Ret	9	NC	Ret	NC	DNQ	Ret	7	0
—	(United Kingdom) John Watson														7			0
—	(Italy) Pierluigi Martini	Ret	Ret	Ret	DNQ	Ret	Ret	Ret	Ret	11^{†}	Ret	Ret	Ret	12	Ret	Ret	8	0
—	(Italy) Riccardo Patrese	Ret	Ret	Ret	Ret	10	Ret	11	9	Ret	Ret	Ret	Ret	Ret	9	Ret	Ret	0
—	(United States) Eddie Cheever	Ret	Ret	Ret	Ret	17	9	10	Ret	Ret	Ret	Ret	Ret	Ret	11	Ret	Ret	0
—	(Italy) Piercarlo Ghinzani	12	9	NC	DNQ	Ret	Ret	15	Ret		DNS	Ret	DNS	Ret	Ret	Ret	Ret	0
—	(France) Philippe Alliot	9	Ret	Ret	DNQ	Ret	Ret	Ret	Ret	Ret	Ret	Ret	Ret	Ret	Ret			0
—	(United Kingdom) Jonathan Palmer		Ret	DNS	11			Ret	Ret	Ret	Ret	Ret						0
—	(West Germany) Manfred Winkelhock	13	NC	Ret	DNQ	Ret	Ret	12	Ret	Ret								0
—	(Italy) Teo Fabi				Ret	Ret	Ret	14^{†}	Ret	Ret^{P}	Ret	Ret	12	Ret	Ret	Ret	Ret	0
—	(France) François Hesnault	Ret	Ret	Ret	DNQ					Ret								0
—	(Australia) Alan Jones												Ret		Ret	DNS	Ret	0
—	(Italy) Mauro Baldi	Ret	Ret	Ret														0
—	(West Germany) Christian Danner													Ret	Ret			0
—	(United Kingdom) Kenny Acheson										Ret	DNQ	Ret					0
Pos	Driver	BRA (Brazil)	POR (Portugal)	SMR (Italy)	MON (Monaco)	CAN (Canada)	DET (United States)	FRA (France)	GBR (United Kingdom)	GER (West Germany)	AUT (Austria)	NED (Netherlands)	ITA (Italy)	BEL (Belgium)	EUR (United Kingdom)	RSA (South Africa)	AUS (Australia)	Points

Key
Colour	Result
Gold	Winner
Silver	Second place
Bronze	Third place
Green	Other points position
Blue	Other classified position
Blue	Not classified, finished (NC)
Purple	Not classified, retired (Ret)
Red	Did not qualify (DNQ)
Black	Disqualified (DSQ)
White	Did not start (DNS)
White	Race cancelled (C)
Blank	Did not practice (DNP)
Blank	Excluded (EX)
Blank	Did not arrive (DNA)
Blank	Withdrawn (WD)
Blank	Did not enter (empty cell)
Annotation	Meaning
P	Pole position
F	Fastest lap

^{†} Driver did not finish the Grand Prix, but was classified as he completed over 90% of the race distance.

Only drivers who scored points were classified by the FIA in the final championship results.

=== World Constructors' Championship standings ===
Pos	Constructor	Car no.	BRA (Brazil)	POR (Portugal)	SMR (Italy)	MON (Monaco)	CAN (Canada)	DET (United States)	FRA (France)	GBR (United Kingdom)	GER (West Germany)	AUT (Austria)	NED (Netherlands)	ITA (Italy)	BEL (Belgium)	EUR (United Kingdom)	RSA (South Africa)	AUS (Australia)	Points
1	(United Kingdom) McLaren-TAG	1	Ret	Ret	4	Ret	Ret	Ret	Ret	Ret	5^{F}	Ret	1	Ret	DNS	7	Ret	Ret	90
1	(United Kingdom) McLaren-TAG	2	1^{F}	Ret	DSQ	1	3	Ret	3	1^{F}	2	1^{P}^{F}	2^{F}	1	3^{P}^{F}	4	3	Ret	90
2	(Italy) Ferrari	27	2^{P}	2	Ret^{F}	2^{F}	1	3	Ret	2	1	3	4	13	Ret	Ret	Ret	Ret	82
2	(Italy) Ferrari	28	4	8	6	Ret	2	2	4	Ret	9	4	Ret	5	Ret	Ret	4	5	82
3	(United Kingdom) Williams-Honda	5	Ret	5	5	7	6	Ret	DNS	Ret	6	Ret	6	11^{F}	2	1	1^{P}	Ret	71
3	(United Kingdom) Williams-Honda	6	Ret	Ret	Ret	8	4	1	2^{P}^{F}	Ret^{P}	12	Ret	Ret	Ret	4	3	2^{F}	1^{F}	71
4	(United Kingdom) Lotus-Renault	11	3	4	1	3	5^{P}	5	5	NC	Ret	5	5	6	Ret	5	Ret	DSQ	71
4	(United Kingdom) Lotus-Renault	12	Ret	1^{P}^{F}	7^{P}	Ret^{P}	16^{F}	Ret^{P}^{F}	Ret	10	Ret	2	3	3^{P}	1	2^{P}	Ret	Ret^{P}	71
5	(United Kingdom) Brabham-BMW	7	Ret	Ret	8	Ret	Ret	6	1	4	Ret	Ret	8^{P}	2	5	Ret	Ret	Ret	26
5	(United Kingdom) Brabham-BMW	8	Ret	Ret	Ret	DNQ	15	8	8	6	Ret	6	10	4	8	Ret	Ret	Ret	26
6	(France) Ligier-Renault	25	Ret	Ret	Ret	4	14	10	Ret	Ret	Ret	Ret	Ret	10	9	8		3	23
6	(France) Ligier-Renault	26	6	Ret	Ret	6	8	12	Ret	3	3	Ret	Ret	Ret	11	Ret^{F}		2	23
7	(France) Renault	14									Ret								16
7	(France) Renault	15	5	3	3	Ret	7	Ret	6	Ret	Ret	10	Ret	7	Ret	12		Ret	16
7	(France) Renault	16	10	7	10	5	Ret	Ret	7	5	Ret	Ret	Ret	Ret	6	Ret		Ret	16
8	(United Kingdom) Arrows-BMW	17	Ret	Ret	Ret	Ret	13	11	Ret	8	7	Ret	9	Ret	7	10	5	6	14
8	(United Kingdom) Arrows-BMW	18	11	Ret	2	9	9	7	9	Ret	4	8	Ret	9	10	6	6	Ret	14
9	(United Kingdom) Tyrrell-Ford	3	8	Ret	9	10	12	Ret											4
9	(United Kingdom) Tyrrell-Ford	4	7	6	Ret	DNQ	11	4	13	11	10	DNQ							4
10	(United Kingdom) Tyrrell-Renault	3							Ret	7	8	7	7	8	13	Ret	7	NC	3
10	(United Kingdom) Tyrrell-Renault	4											Ret			Ret	Ret	4	3
—	(Italy) Osella-Alfa Romeo	24	12	9	NC	DNQ	Ret	Ret	15	Ret	Ret	9	NC	Ret	NC	DNQ	Ret	7	0
—	(Italy) Minardi-Motori Moderni	29			Ret	DNQ	Ret	Ret	Ret	Ret	11	Ret	Ret	Ret	12	Ret	Ret	8	0
—	(Italy) Alfa Romeo	22	Ret	Ret	Ret	Ret	10	Ret	11	9	Ret	Ret	Ret	Ret	Ret	9	Ret	Ret	0
—	(Italy) Alfa Romeo	23	Ret	Ret	Ret	Ret	17	9	10	Ret	Ret	Ret	Ret	Ret	Ret	11	Ret	Ret	0
—	(United Kingdom) RAM-Hart	9	13	NC	Ret	DNQ	Ret	Ret	12	Ret	Ret	Ret	Ret	Ret	Ret	Ret			0
—	(United Kingdom) RAM-Hart	10	9	Ret	Ret	DNQ	Ret	Ret	Ret	Ret	Ret	Ret	DNQ	Ret					0
—	(West Germany) Zakspeed	30		Ret	DNS	11			Ret	Ret	Ret	Ret	Ret		Ret	Ret			0
—	(United Kingdom) Toleman-Hart	19				Ret	Ret	Ret	14	Ret	Ret^{P}	Ret	Ret	12	Ret	Ret	Ret	Ret	0
—	(United Kingdom) Toleman-Hart	20										DNS	Ret	DNS	Ret	Ret	Ret	Ret	0
—	(United Kingdom) Lola-Hart	33												Ret		Ret	DNS	Ret	0
—	(United Kingdom) Spirit-Hart	21	Ret	Ret	Ret														0
—	(Italy) Minardi-Ford	29	Ret	Ret															0
Pos	Constructor	Car no.	BRA (Brazil)	POR (Portugal)	SMR (Italy)	MON (Monaco)	CAN (Canada)	DET (United States)	FRA (France)	GBR (United Kingdom)	GER (West Germany)	AUT (Austria)	NED (Netherlands)	ITA (Italy)	BEL (Belgium)	EUR (United Kingdom)	RSA (South Africa)	AUS (Australia)	Points

Only manufacturers that scored points were classified by the FIA in the final championship results.
