= 1985 Detroit Grand Prix =

- Race 6 of 16 in the 1985 Formula One World Championship

Race details
- Date: June 23, 1985
- Official name: 4th Detroit Grand Prix
- Location: Detroit Street Circuit; Detroit, Michigan
- Course: Temporary street course
- Course length: 4.120 km (2.56 miles)
- Distance: 63 laps, 259.56 km (161.28 miles)
- Weather: Clear and cool with temperatures reaching up to 80.1 °F (26.7 °C); wind speeds up to 23 miles per hour (37 km/h)

Pole position
Driver	(Brazil) Ayrton Senna	Lotus-Renault
- Time: 1:42.051

Fastest lap
Driver	(Brazil) Ayrton Senna	Lotus-Renault
- Time: 1:45.612 on lap 51

Podium
First	(Finland) Keke Rosberg	Williams-Honda
Second	(Sweden) Stefan Johansson	Ferrari
Third	(Italy) Michele Alboreto	Ferrari

The 1985 Detroit Grand Prix was a Formula One motor race held on June 23, 1985, in Detroit, Michigan. It was the sixth round of the 1985 FIA Formula One World Championship and the fourth Detroit Grand Prix. The race was held over 63 laps of the four kilometre circuit for a total race distance of 260 kilometres.

For the first time in ten years, the United States hosted only one Grand Prix. Finland's Keke Rosberg (Williams FW10) took the lead from pole-sitter Ayrton Senna (Lotus 97T) on lap eight, avoided the tire and brake problems that plagued the other front-runners and held off the Ferrari 156/85s of Stefan Johansson and Michele Alboreto to win. Stefan Bellof earned a scintillating fourth place in his Tyrrell 012, scoring the last points for the legendary Cosworth-Ford DFV engine until 1988. It was the fourth Formula One Grand Prix victory for the 1982 World Champion. Alboreto's third place allowed him to expand his points lead over Lotus driver Elio de Angelis to seven points. Eventual 1985 World Champion Alain Prost was now nine points behind Alboreto and as far from the championship as he would get all year.

== Summary ==
The street circuit used for this Grand Prix laid out in the center of Detroit had been modified a little- the inside wall at the left-right sequence of corners on Beaubien Street between Congress Street and the notoriously bumpy Larned Street had been moved closer to the street itself, which made the right hander transitioning between Beaubien and Larned Streets slower than before. A bridge connecting 2 buildings flanking Larned Street had also been built; which actually hid the worst bumps on Larned from camera view- although these bumps were made obvious to viewers by the car's undertrays creating sparks thanks to the cars bouncing over these bumps rather violently.

In Friday qualifying, Senna's nimble Lotus, well suited to the track, and combined with Senna’s raw talent was easily quickest in both sessions, averaging 88.183 mph (141.917 km/h), nearly 1.2 seconds clear of Nigel Mansell's Williams. Still, changes to the course meant that Senna's time was over a second slower than Nelson Piquet's pole-winning time from the previous year. The Ferraris of Alboreto and Johansson were in third and ninth place, as Alboreto said, "Our suspension does not absorb the bumps nearly as well as the Lotus. I have trouble getting the power down, which is necessary between the slow corners." Rain on Saturday meant that the Friday times would determine the grid, and the teams would be without a much-needed second day of practice although Gerhard Berger had to set his qualifying time on the Saturday as he didn't set a time on Friday after crashing twice before he could set a time.

The Williams teammates used different tyre compounds in qualifying and were over a second apart on the grid. Rosberg, on qualifiers, was fifth, while Mansell chose the softer race compound and placed second. This revelation led Rosberg to gamble on using the soft race rubber for the race, while everyone else had the harder compound. Aided by a cool breeze on Sunday, this decision played an important role in the race's outcome.

Sunday was warm, humid, clear and breezy with a large crowd. Unlike the 1984 race, the drivers made a clean start, as Mansell got away well on the outside and took the first corner ahead of Senna. In Turn 2, however, Senna took the lead back, and by the end of the first lap, Rosberg had also gotten around Mansell. After one lap, Senna and Rosberg were opening a gap to Mansell, Prost, Alboreto, Derek Warwick, Elio de Angelis, Johansson, Piquet and Lauda. The Tyrrells of Bellof and Martin Brundle, down on power to the turbos but always well suited to the tight Detroit circuit, each moved up six places on the first lap to 12th and 13th.

But as the race went on, the track was already beginning to break up, with the worst break up at Turn 2. By lap seven, Senna and Rosberg led Mansell by seven seconds. On lap eight, Senna surrendered the lead when he pitted for tires; regretting his gamble to try to run much of the race on one set of tires, relying on his car's superior performance to all of the other cars. Warwick had dropped back steadily, eventually retiring with a broken driveshaft, while the McLarens of Prost and Lauda quickly experienced brake problems. Lauda made it back to the pits to retire with no brakes on lap 10, but when Prost had the same problem on lap 20, he was unable to slow for Turn 2 and slid into the tyre wall.

De Angelis, on the other hand, was making steady progress. He took fourth when Senna pitted, then passed Alboreto for third and began closing the gap to Mansell, who also was struggling with overheating brakes. On lap 20, with Rosberg's lead at 24 seconds, de Angelis got around Mansell to take second place. Mansell pitted on lap 24 after losing another position to Johansson. He returned in ninth place only to retire immediately when he hit the wall hard in Turn 2.

As he was about to be lapped, Gerhard Berger damaged the nose of de Angelis' Lotus when he closed the door on the Italian. When de Angelis pitted for tires and a new nose, the Tyrrells were nose to tail in fourth and fifth, hounding the Ferrari of Alboreto. Approaching Turn 16 on lap 31, Philippe Alliot moved over to let Alboreto through but didn't see Brundle right behind. When Alliot moved back to the racing line, Brundle had nowhere to go and hit the wall in a shower of sparks.

At the halfway point, Rosberg led Johansson by 33 seconds. Alboreto was another 10 seconds back, followed by Bellof, Senna and de Angelis. Several successive fastest laps by Senna allowed him to overtake Bellof and then quickly close the gap to Alboreto.

Entering Turn 2, where the surface was beginning to break up and where both Prost and Mansell had crashed, Alboreto stayed right, away from the racing line and the bad patch at the apex. Senna charged through on the left, got on the marbles, and hit the wall exactly as the others had done, while Alboreto continued, minus the threat to his third place. Meanwhile, Rosberg, secure in the lead, had noticed his water temperature climbing. When a member of the crew noticed something caught in his radiator, he pitted to have it removed. The crew also gave him new tyres, which he didn't want because Johansson was not far behind. Rosberg blasted out of the pits and just managed to beat the Ferrari to the first corner. Spurred on by the chance for his first win, Johansson hounded the Williams until, with just three laps to go, a brake disc broke up and he began to crawl around the circuit, hoping to make the finish.

Alboreto, in third, had also been trying to save his brakes, but he now had to contend with a charging Bellof. With two laps to go, the West German had the Tyrrell right on Alboreto's tail, waiting for a mistake. Just as he was about to go by, however, Bellof's clutch began slipping, and he had to be content to follow the Ferrari home, scoring the last points for Ford-Cosworth DFV engine in Formula One. De Angelis, the last driver on the lead lap took fifth place, and Piquet brought the Brabham home in sixth.

== Classification ==
=== Qualifying ===
Pos	No	Driver	Constructor	Q1	Q2	Gap
1	12	(Brazil) Ayrton Senna	Lotus-Renault	1:42.051		—
2	5	(United Kingdom) Nigel Mansell	Williams-Honda	1:43.249		+1.198
3	27	(Italy) Michele Alboreto	Ferrari	1:43.748		+1.697
4	2	(France) Alain Prost	McLaren-TAG	1:44.088		+2.037
5	6	(Finland) Keke Rosberg	Williams-Honda	1:44.156		+2.105
6	16	(United Kingdom) Derek Warwick	Renault	1:44.163		+2.112
7	23	(United States) Eddie Cheever	Alfa Romeo	1:44.231	2:05.540	+2.180
8	11	(Italy) Elio de Angelis	Lotus-Renault	1:44.769		+2.718
9	28	(Sweden) Stefan Johansson	Ferrari	1:44.921		+2.870
10	7	(Brazil) Nelson Piquet	Brabham-BMW	1:45.194		+3.143
11	8	(Switzerland) Marc Surer	Brabham-BMW	1:45.979		+3.928
12	1	(Austria) Niki Lauda	McLaren-TAG	1:46.266		+4.215
13	19	(Italy) Teo Fabi	Toleman-Hart	1:46.546		+4.495
14	22	(Italy) Riccardo Patrese	Alfa Romeo	1:46.592		+4.541
15	15	(France) Patrick Tambay	Renault	1:47.028		+4.977
16	26	(France) Jacques Laffite	Ligier-Renault	1:47.267		+5.216
17	25	(Italy) Andrea de Cesaris	Ligier-Renault	1:47.393	2:12.268	+5.342
18	3	(United Kingdom) Martin Brundle	Tyrrell-Ford	1:47.563		+5.512
19	4	(West Germany) Stefan Bellof	Tyrrell-Ford	1:47.911		+5.860
20	9	(West Germany) Manfred Winkelhock	RAM-Hart	1:47.926		+5.875
21	18	(Belgium) Thierry Boutsen	Arrows-BMW	1:48.023		+5.978
22	24	(Italy) Piercarlo Ghinzani	Osella-Alfa Romeo	1:48.546	2:11.268	+6.495
23	10	(France) Philippe Alliot	RAM-Hart	1:50.455	2:24.814	+8.404
24	17	(Austria) Gerhard Berger	Arrows-BMW		2:05.387	+23.336
25	29	(Italy) Pierluigi Martini	Minardi-Motori Moderni	3:04.446		+1:22.395

=== Race ===
Pos	No	Driver	Constructor	Tyre	Laps	Time/Retired	Grid	Points
1	6	(Finland) Keke Rosberg	Williams-Honda	G	63	1:55:39.851	5	9
2	28	(Sweden) Stefan Johansson	Ferrari	G	63	+ 57.549	9	6
3	27	(Italy) Michele Alboreto	Ferrari	G	63	+ 1:03.170	3	4
4	4	(West Germany) Stefan Bellof	Tyrrell-Ford	G	63	+ 1:06.225	19	3
5	11	(Italy) Elio de Angelis	Lotus-Renault	G	63	+ 1:26.966	8	2
6	7	(Brazil) Nelson Piquet	Brabham-BMW	P	62	+ 1 Lap	10	1
7	18	(Belgium) Thierry Boutsen	Arrows-BMW	G	62	+ 1 Lap	21	
8	8	(Switzerland) Marc Surer	Brabham-BMW	P	62	+ 1 Lap	11	
9	23	(United States) Eddie Cheever	Alfa Romeo	G	61	+ 2 Laps	7	
10	25	(Italy) Andrea de Cesaris	Ligier-Renault	P	61	+ 2 Laps	17	
11	17	(Austria) Gerhard Berger	Arrows-BMW	G	60	+ 3 Laps	24	
12	26	(France) Jacques Laffite	Ligier-Renault	P	58	+ 5 Laps	16	
Ret	12	(Brazil) Ayrton Senna	Lotus-Renault	G	51	Accident	1	
Ret	3	(United Kingdom) Martin Brundle	Tyrrell-Ford	G	30	Collision	18	
Ret	10	(France) Philippe Alliot	RAM-Hart	P	27	Collision	23	
Ret	5	(United Kingdom) Nigel Mansell	Williams-Honda	G	26	Accident	2	
Ret	2	(France) Alain Prost	McLaren-TAG	G	19	Accident	4	
Ret	22	(Italy) Riccardo Patrese	Alfa Romeo	G	19	Electrical	14	
Ret	16	(United Kingdom) Derek Warwick	Renault	G	18	Transmission	6	
Ret	15	(France) Patrick Tambay	Renault	G	15	Accident	15	
Ret	29	(Italy) Pierluigi Martini	Minardi-Motori Moderni	P	11	Engine	25	
Ret	1	(Austria) Niki Lauda	McLaren-TAG	G	10	Brakes	12	
Ret	19	(Italy) Teo Fabi	Toleman-Hart	P	4	Clutch	13	
Ret	9	(West Germany) Manfred Winkelhock	RAM-Hart	P	3	Turbo	20	
Ret	24	(Italy) Piercarlo Ghinzani	Osella-Alfa Romeo	P	0	Accident	22	

== Championship standings after the race ==
Drivers' Championship standings

Pos	Driver	Points
1	(Italy) Michele Alboreto	31
2	(Italy) Elio de Angelis	24
3	(France) Alain Prost	22
4	(Sweden) Stefan Johansson	13
5	(Finland) Keke Rosberg	12

Constructors' Championship standings

Pos	Constructor	Points
1	(Italy) Ferrari	47
2	(United Kingdom) Lotus-Renault	33
3	(United Kingdom) McLaren-TAG	25
4	(United Kingdom) Williams-Honda	17
5	(France) Renault	12

- Note: Only the top five positions are included for both sets of standings.

Previous race: 1985 Canadian Grand Prix	FIA Formula One World Championship; 1985 season	Next race: 1985 French Grand Prix
Previous race: 1984 Detroit Grand Prix	Detroit Grand Prix	Next race: 1986 Detroit Grand Prix
