= 1985 Canadian Grand Prix =

- Race 5 of 16 in the 1985 Formula One World Championship

Race details
- Date: 16 June 1985
- Official name: XXIV Grand Prix du Canada
- Location: Circuit Gilles Villeneuve; Montreal, Quebec, Canada
- Course: Temporary street circuit
- Course length: 4.410 km (2.740 miles)
- Distance: 70 laps, 308.700 km (191.817 miles)
- Weather: Sunny with temperatures approaching 20.5 °C (68.9 °F); wind speeds up to 12.9 kilometres per hour (8.0 mph)

Pole position
Driver	(Italy) Elio de Angelis	Lotus-Renault
- Time: 1:24.567

Fastest lap
Driver	(Brazil) Ayrton Senna	Lotus-Renault
- Time: 1:27.445 on lap 45

Podium
First	(Italy) Michele Alboreto	Ferrari
Second	(Sweden) Stefan Johansson	Ferrari
Third	(France) Alain Prost	McLaren-TAG

The 1985 Canadian Grand Prix was a Formula One motor race held at Circuit Gilles Villeneuve in Montreal on 16 June 1985. It was the fifth race of the 1985 Formula One World Championship.

The 70-lap race was won by Italian driver Michele Alboreto, driving a Ferrari, with Swedish teammate Stefan Johansson second and Frenchman Alain Prost third in a McLaren-TAG. The win gave Alboreto the lead of the Drivers' Championship by five points from Prost and fellow Italian Elio de Angelis, who finished fifth in his Lotus-Renault having started from pole position, while Ferrari took the lead of the Constructors' Championship.

== Qualifying ==
=== Qualifying report ===
Qualifying saw Elio de Angelis take pole position in his Lotus by just under three-tenths of a second from teammate Ayrton Senna, with the Ferraris of Michele Alboreto and Stefan Johansson immediately behind them on the second row. Alain Prost was fifth in his McLaren, with Derek Warwick sixth in the factory Renault. The top ten was completed by Thierry Boutsen in the Arrows, Keke Rosberg in the Williams, Nelson Piquet in the Brabham and Patrick Tambay in the second factory Renault. Reigning World Champion Niki Lauda could only manage 17th in the second McLaren, one place behind Nigel Mansell in the second Williams.

=== Qualifying classification ===
Pos	No	Driver	Constructor	Q1	Q2	Gap
1	11	(Italy) Elio de Angelis	Lotus-Renault	1:26.895	1:24.567	
2	12	(Brazil) Ayrton Senna	Lotus-Renault	1:25.399	1:24.816	+0.289
3	27	(Italy) Michele Alboreto	Ferrari	1:25.127	1:25.832	+0.600
4	28	(Sweden) Stefan Johansson	Ferrari	1:27.870	1:25.170	+0.643
5	2	(France) Alain Prost	McLaren-TAG	1:25.977	1:25.557	+1.030
6	16	(United Kingdom) Derek Warwick	Renault	1:26.801	1:25.622	+1.095
7	18	(Belgium) Thierry Boutsen	Arrows-BMW	1:28.241	1:25.846	+1.319
8	6	(Finland) Keke Rosberg	Williams-Honda	1:26.265	1:26.097	+1.570
9	7	(Brazil) Nelson Piquet	Brabham-BMW	1:27.004	1:26.301	+1.774
10	15	(France) Patrick Tambay	Renault	1:26.958	1:26.340	+1.813
11	23	(United States) Eddie Cheever	Alfa Romeo	1:27.638	1:26.354	+1.827
12	17	(Austria) Gerhard Berger	Arrows-BMW	1:30.826	1:26.743	+2.216
13	22	(Italy) Riccardo Patrese	Alfa Romeo	1:28.081	1:26.995	+2.468
14	9	(West Germany) Manfred Winkelhock	RAM-Hart	1:31.147	1:27.266	+2.739
15	25	(Italy) Andrea de Cesaris	Ligier-Renault	1:28.746	1:27.403	+2.876
16	5	(United Kingdom) Nigel Mansell	Williams-Honda	1:28.367	1:27.728	+3.201
17	1	(Austria) Niki Lauda	McLaren-TAG	1:28.126	1:28.130	+3.599
18	19	(Italy) Teo Fabi	Toleman-Hart	1:29.910	1:28.625	+4.098
19	26	(France) Jacques Laffite	Ligier-Renault	1:29.730	1:28.750	+4.223
20	8	(Switzerland) Marc Surer	Brabham-BMW	1:30.206	1:29.473	+4.946
21	10	(France) Philippe Alliot	RAM-Hart	1:29.501	1:36.960	+4.974
22	24	(Italy) Piercarlo Ghinzani	Osella-Alfa Romeo	1:32.299	1:31.576	+7.049
23	4	(West Germany) Stefan Bellof	Tyrrell-Ford	1:32.589	1:31.733	+7.206
24	3	(United Kingdom) Martin Brundle	Tyrrell-Ford	1:32.760	1:31.923	+7.396
25	29	(Italy) Pierluigi Martini	Minardi-Motori Moderni	1:34.985	1:37.148	+10.458

== Race ==
=== Race report ===
At the start, de Angelis led away from Senna and Alboreto. Warwick made a fast start to run fourth, before suffering handling problems. On lap 6, Senna pitted with a turbo problem, losing five laps in the process. Alboreto then closed up to de Angelis, before passing him for the lead on lap 13. In mid-race, Johansson also passed de Angelis to set up a Ferrari 1–2, while Lauda retired with an engine failure after a "disappointing weekend." Alboreto eventually took the chequered flag 1.9 seconds ahead of Johansson, with Prost and Rosberg moving into third and fourth respectively in the closing laps, and de Angelis having to settle for fifth, ahead of Mansell. Johansson had to contend with an intermittent misfire and when he got too close to Alboreto, the team leader simply turned up the turbo pressure and pulled away. Both de Angelis and Prost had to slow down considerably so as to not run out of fuel (with Prost having to stop almost immediately after crossing the finishing line).

=== Race classification ===
Pos	No	Driver	Constructor	Laps	Time/Retired	Grid	Points
1	27	(Italy) Michele Alboreto	Ferrari	70	1:46:01.813	3	9
2	28	(Sweden) Stefan Johansson	Ferrari	70	+ 1.957	4	6
3	2	(France) Alain Prost	McLaren-TAG	70	+ 4.341	5	4
4	6	(Finland) Keke Rosberg	Williams-Honda	70	+ 27.821	8	3
5	11	(Italy) Elio de Angelis	Lotus-Renault	70	+ 43.349	1	2
6	5	(United Kingdom) Nigel Mansell	Williams-Honda	70	+ 1:17.878	16	1
7	15	(France) Patrick Tambay	Renault	69	+ 1 lap	10	
8	26	(France) Jacques Laffite	Ligier-Renault	69	+ 1 lap	19	
9	18	(Belgium) Thierry Boutsen	Arrows-BMW	68	+ 2 laps	7	
10	22	(Italy) Riccardo Patrese	Alfa Romeo	68	+ 2 laps	13	
11	4	(West Germany) Stefan Bellof	Tyrrell-Ford	68	+ 2 laps	23	
12	3	(United Kingdom) Martin Brundle	Tyrrell-Ford	68	+ 2 laps	24	
13	17	(Austria) Gerhard Berger	Arrows-BMW	67	+ 3 laps	12	
14	25	(Italy) Andrea de Cesaris	Ligier-Renault	67	+ 3 laps	15	
15	8	(Switzerland) Marc Surer	Brabham-BMW	67	+ 3 laps	20	
16	12	(Brazil) Ayrton Senna	Lotus-Renault	65	+ 5 laps	2	
17	23	(United States) Eddie Cheever	Alfa Romeo	64	+ 6 laps	11	
Ret	29	(Italy) Pierluigi Martini	Minardi-Motori Moderni	57	Accident	25	
Ret	1	(Austria) Niki Lauda	McLaren-TAG	37	Engine	17	
Ret	24	(Italy) Piercarlo Ghinzani	Osella-Alfa Romeo	35	Engine	22	
Ret	10	(France) Philippe Alliot	RAM-Hart	28	Accident	21	
Ret	16	(United Kingdom) Derek Warwick	Renault	25	Accident	6	
Ret	9	(West Germany) Manfred Winkelhock	RAM-Hart	5	Accident	14	
Ret	19	(Italy) Teo Fabi	Toleman-Hart	3	Turbo	18	
Ret	7	(Brazil) Nelson Piquet	Brabham-BMW	0	Transmission	9	

== Championship standings after the race ==
Drivers' Championship standings

Pos	Driver	Points
1	(Italy) Michele Alboreto	27
2	(France) Alain Prost	22
3	(Italy) Elio de Angelis	22
4	(France) Patrick Tambay	10
5	(Brazil) Ayrton Senna	9

Constructors' Championship standings

Pos	Constructor	Points
1	(Italy) Ferrari	37
2	(United Kingdom) Lotus-Renault	31
3	(United Kingdom) McLaren-TAG	25
4	(France) Renault	12
5	(United Kingdom) Williams-Honda	8

- Note: Only the top five positions are included for both sets of standings.

Previous race: 1985 Monaco Grand Prix	FIA Formula One World Championship; 1985 season	Next race: 1985 Detroit Grand Prix
Previous race: 1984 Canadian Grand Prix	Canadian Grand Prix	Next race: 1986 Canadian Grand Prix
