= RAM 03 =

Formula One car

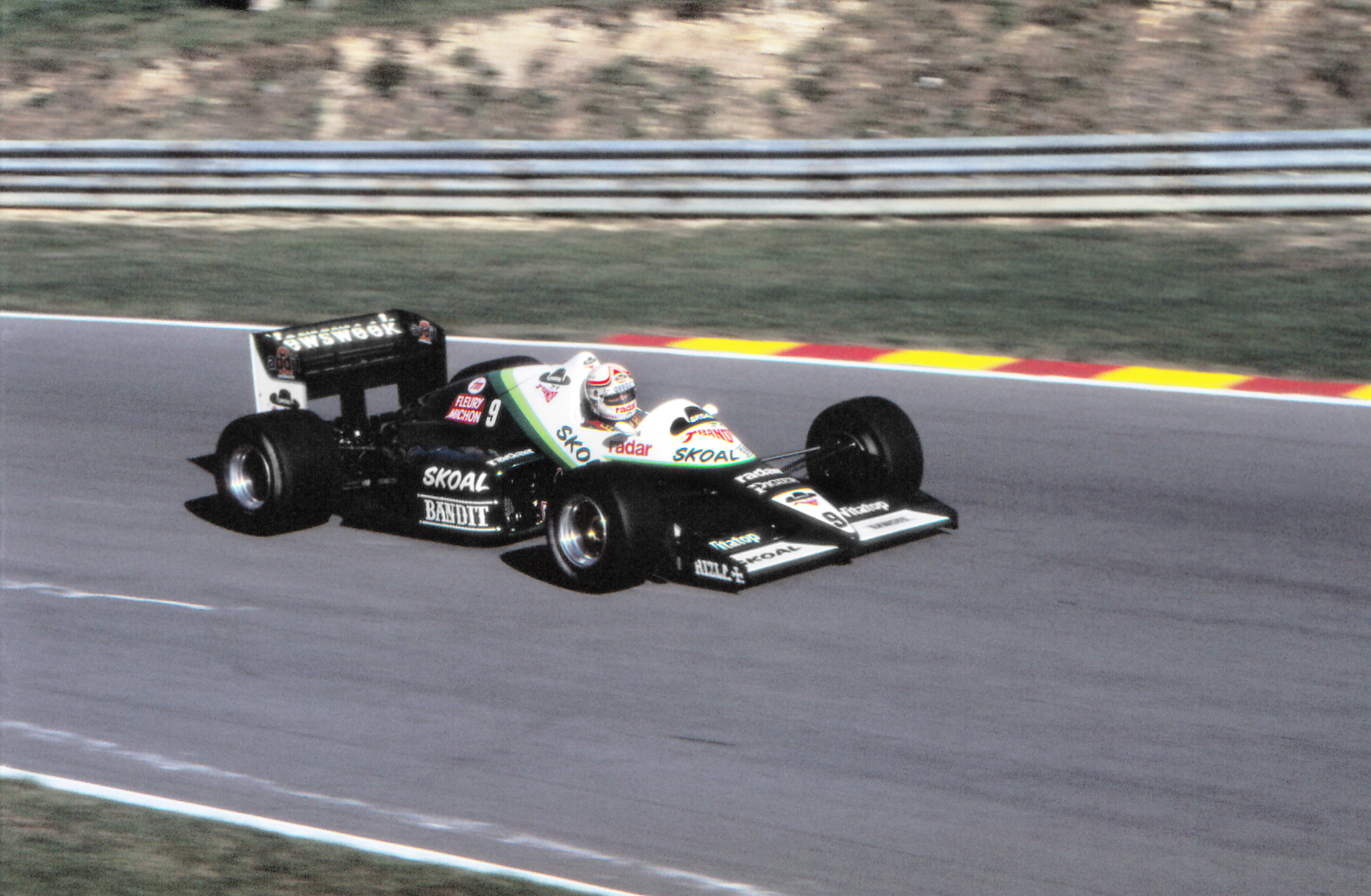
- Category: Formula One
- Constructor: RAM Racing
- Designer(s): Gustav Brunner and Sergio Rinland

Technical specifications
- Chassis: Carbon fiber monocoque
- Suspension (front): Double wishbones, pull-rod-actuated coil springs and dampers, anti-roll bar
- Suspension (rear): Double wishbones, pull-rod-actuated coil springs and dampers, anti-roll bar
- Wheelbase: 2,794 mm (110.0 in)
- Engine: Hart 415T 1,496 cc (91.3 cu in) I4 turbocharged mid-mounted
- Transmission: Hewland FGA 400 5-speed manual.
- Power: 750 hp (560 kW)
- Weight: 550 kg (1,210 lb)
- Fuel: Shell
- Tyres: Pirelli

Competition history
- Notable drivers: Manfred Winkelhock; Philippe Alliot; Kenny Acheson; Mike Thackwell
- Debut: 1985 Brazilian Grand Prix
Races	Wins	Poles	F/Laps
15	0	0	0

The RAM 03 was an open-wheel Formula One race car, designed, developed and built by British racing team and constructor RAM, to compete in the 1985 and 1986 Formula One world championship.

In 1986 an updated version called 03B was introduced and was driven by New Zealander Mike Thackwell during the pre-season testing for the 1986 season held at Jacarepaguá.

Later in 1986 one of the 03 chassis was converted into a Formula 3000 car, the 04. The car contested a number of races in the 1986 Formula 3000 championship.
