= 1987 Austrian Grand Prix =

- Race 10 of 16 in the 1987 Formula One World Championship
- The Österreichring (last modified in 1977)

Race details
- Date: 16 August 1987
- Official name: XXV Großer Preis von Österreich
- Location: Österreichring, Spielberg, Styria, Austria
- Course: Permanent racing facility
- Course length: 5.942 km (3.692 miles)
- Distance: 52 laps, 308.984 km (191.984 miles)
- Weather: Dry

Pole position
Driver	(Brazil) Nelson Piquet	Williams-Honda
- Time: 1:23.357

Fastest lap
Driver	(United Kingdom) Nigel Mansell	Williams-Honda
- Time: 1:28.318 on lap 31 (lap record)

Podium
First	(United Kingdom) Nigel Mansell	Williams-Honda
Second	(Brazil) Nelson Piquet	Williams-Honda
Third	(Italy) Teo Fabi	Benetton-Ford

The 1987 Austrian Grand Prix was a Formula One motor race held at Österreichring on 16 August 1987. It was the tenth race of the 1987 Formula One World Championship. It was the twentieth Austrian Grand Prix, and the last to be held until 1997. The race was run over 52 laps of the 5.94-kilometre (3.69 mi) circuit for a total race distance of 308.9 kilometres (191.9 mi), also being the last race in the original track.

The race needed to be restarted twice following crashes on the starting grid. It was eventually won by British driver Nigel Mansell, driving a Williams-Honda. Mansell took his third victory of the season by 56 seconds from Brazilian teammate Nelson Piquet, with Italian Teo Fabi third in a Benetton-Ford.

== Race summary ==
The race was plagued with accidents. The first major incident came when Stefan Johansson hit a deer with his McLaren MP4/3 after it wandered onto the circuit during Friday practice. The terrified deer was crossing the track to seek refuge from the noise of the cars when it was struck by Johansson traveling at close to 140 mph (225 km/h), killing it instantly. The McLaren left front suspension was broken in the impact causing it to spear off into the guardrail and all four corners of the car, as well as the carbon fibre monocoque were destroyed. Johansson was fortunate to escape with little more than a headache, though he was later flown by helicopter to a hospital in Klagenfurt for x-rays after complaining of headaches and neck pains. His crash caused McLaren to have to fly a spare car overnight from the team's base in Woking. Nelson Piquet's Williams-Honda had collided with the AGS of Pascal Fabre, ending with the Williams impacting in the wall.

== Qualifying ==
Pos	No	Driver	Constructor	Q1	Q2	Gap
1	6	(Brazil) Nelson Piquet	Williams-Honda	1:23.357	1:49.991	—
2	5	(United Kingdom) Nigel Mansell	Williams-Honda	1:23.459	1:33.779	+0.102
3	28	(Austria) Gerhard Berger	Ferrari	1:24.213	1:38.388	+0.856
4	20	(Belgium) Thierry Boutsen	Benetton-Ford	1:24.348	1:48.124	+0.991
5	19	(Italy) Teo Fabi	Benetton-Ford	1:25.054	no time	+1.697
6	27	(Italy) Michele Alboreto	Ferrari	1:25.077	1:45.518	+1.720
7	12	(Brazil) Ayrton Senna	Lotus-Honda	1:25.492	1:39.647	+2.135
8	7	(Italy) Riccardo Patrese	Brabham-BMW	1:25.766	1:53.119	+2.409
9	1	(France) Alain Prost	McLaren-TAG	1:26.170	1:43.132	+2.813
10	8	(Italy) Andrea de Cesaris	Brabham-BMW	1:27.672	no time	+4.315
11	17	(United Kingdom) Derek Warwick	Arrows-Megatron	1:27.762	no time	+4.405
12	18	(United States) Eddie Cheever	Arrows-Megatron	1:28.370	1:37.908	+5.013
13	11	(Japan) Satoru Nakajima	Lotus-Honda	1:28.786	1:43.002	+5.429
14	2	(Sweden) Stefan Johansson	McLaren-TAG	1:29.003	1:41.711	+5.646
15	24	(Italy) Alessandro Nannini	Minardi-Motori Moderni	1:29.435	1:49.566	+6.078
16	25	(France) René Arnoux	Ligier-Megatron	1:29.733	no time	+6.376
17	9	(United Kingdom) Martin Brundle	Zakspeed	1:29.893	1:42.383	+6.536
18	26	(Italy) Piercarlo Ghinzani	Ligier-Megatron	1:30.682	no time	+7.325
19	23	(Spain) Adrián Campos	Minardi-Motori Moderni	1:30.797	1:47.128	+7.440
20	10	(West Germany) Christian Danner	Zakspeed	1:31.015	1:48.880	+7.658
21	21	(Italy) Alex Caffi	Osella-Alfa Romeo	1:32.313	1:50.273	+8.956
22	30	(France) Philippe Alliot	Lola-Ford	1:33.741	1:48.595	+10.384
23	16	(Italy) Ivan Capelli	March-Ford	1:34.199	1:54.807	+10.842
24	3	(United Kingdom) Jonathan Palmer	Tyrrell-Ford	1:34.619	1:49.308	+11.262
25	4	(France) Philippe Streiff	Tyrrell-Ford	1:35.338	1:51.624	+11.981
26	14	(France) Pascal Fabre	AGS-Ford	1:40.633	1:57.236	+17.276

== Race ==
=== Two Start line accidents ===
The race started at 2:30 pm Central European Time (UTC+1). The first race start ended quickly after the Zakspeed of Martin Brundle crashed, then the two Tyrrells of Jonathan Palmer and Philippe Streiff collided in the ensuing chaos with Piercarlo Ghinzani also crashing his Ligier. The second attempt to start was more serious. Mansell on the front row crawled away with clutch problems and the grid compacted behind him. The Österreichring's narrow front straight saw to the rest when Eddie Cheever (Arrows) and Riccardo Patrese (Brabham) collided and half the grid, including Johansson, Alex Caffi (Osella), Ivan Capelli (March), Pascal Fabre, Philippe Alliot (Larrousse-Lola), and both Zakspeeds of Brundle and Christian Danner were involved in the ensuing pile-up.

=== Restart ===
For the third start Streiff was missing as Tyrrell had simply run out of usable cars and Palmer got the use of the surviving DG016 as he had qualified higher than his team mate (exactly the reverse of the situation earlier in the year in Belgium when Palmer was forced to sit out the restart with both race Tyrrells wrecked, Streiff got the spare as he had qualified ahead of Palmer). Several drivers were in repaired cars or in spare cars, including Ayrton Senna after a CV joint failed in his Lotus during the second start. The third start, over two hours late, continued to claim cars. Alain Prost (McLaren) had an electrical failure as the warm-up lap began. The team mechanics got the car going and Prost started from the pitlane along with Senna and the Ferrari of Michele Alboreto. The third attempt to start had no problems although Johansson soon pitted with a puncture then had a tyre fall off on his out lap after a chaotic pitstop. Johansson made it back to the pits and resumed.

Piquet led early from Thierry Boutsen in his Benetton and Mansell. Boutsen pitted with gear linking problems and Mansell leapt past Piquet while negotiating lapped cars on the straight leading into the Bosch Kurve. Fabi (Benetton) was a lap down in third ahead of Boutsen in a season best result for the team. Recovering from their difficulties, Senna, Prost and Johansson finished fifth, sixth and seventh. Ghinzani was eighth for Ligier ahead of Danner and René Arnoux in the second Ligier. Sixteen cars finished although Fabre had not completed enough laps to be classified and 14th placed Brundle would be disqualified for a bodywork infringement on the spare Zakspeed 871, pressed into service after the startline collisions.

=== Classification ===
Numbers in brackets refer to positions of naturally aspirated entrants competing for the Jim Clark Trophy.

Pos	No	Driver	Constructor	Laps	Time/Retired	Grid	Points
1	5	(United Kingdom) Nigel Mansell	Williams-Honda	52	1:18:44.898	2	9
2	6	(Brazil) Nelson Piquet	Williams-Honda	52	+ 55.704	1	6
3	19	(Italy) Teo Fabi	Benetton-Ford	51	+ 1 Lap	5	4
4	20	(Belgium) Thierry Boutsen	Benetton-Ford	51	+ 1 Lap	4	3
5	12	(Brazil) Ayrton Senna	Lotus-Honda	50	+ 2 Laps	7	2
6	1	(France) Alain Prost	McLaren-TAG	50	+ 2 Laps	9	1
7	2	(Sweden) Stefan Johansson	McLaren-TAG	50	+ 2 Laps	14	
8	26	(Italy) Piercarlo Ghinzani	Ligier-Megatron	50	+ 2 Laps	18	
9	10	(West Germany) Christian Danner	Zakspeed	49	+ 3 Laps	20	
10	25	(France) René Arnoux	Ligier-Megatron	49	+ 3 Laps	16	
11 (1)	16	(Italy) Ivan Capelli	March-Ford	49	+ 3 Laps	23	
12 (2)	30	(France) Philippe Alliot	Lola-Ford	49	+ 3 Laps	22	
13	11	(Japan) Satoru Nakajima	Lotus-Honda	49	+ 3 Laps	13	
DSQ	9	(United Kingdom) Martin Brundle	Zakspeed	48	Bodywork infringement	17	
14 (3)	3	(United Kingdom) Jonathan Palmer	Tyrrell-Ford	47	+ 5 Laps	24	
NC	14	(France) Pascal Fabre	AGS-Ford	45	+ 7 Laps	26	
Ret	7	(Italy) Riccardo Patrese	Brabham-BMW	43	Engine	8	
Ret	27	(Italy) Michele Alboreto	Ferrari	42	Turbo	6	
Ret	8	(Italy) Andrea de Cesaris	Brabham-BMW	35	Engine	10	
Ret	17	(United Kingdom) Derek Warwick	Arrows-Megatron	35	Engine	11	
Ret	18	(United States) Eddie Cheever	Arrows-Megatron	31	Tyre	12	
Ret	28	(Austria) Gerhard Berger	Ferrari	5	Turbo	3	
Ret	23	(Spain) Adrián Campos	Minardi-Motori Moderni	3	Electrical	19	
Ret	24	(Italy) Alessandro Nannini	Minardi-Motori Moderni	1	Engine	15	
Ret	21	(Italy) Alex Caffi	Osella-Alfa Romeo	0	Electrical	21	
Ret	4	(France) Philippe Streiff	Tyrrell-Ford	0	Accident	25	

== Championship standings after the race ==
Drivers' Championship standings

Pos	Driver	Points
1	(Brazil) Nelson Piquet	54
2	(Brazil) Ayrton Senna	43
3	(United Kingdom) Nigel Mansell	39
4	(France) Alain Prost	31
5	(Sweden) Stefan Johansson	19

Constructors' Championship standings

Pos	Constructor	Points
1	(United Kingdom) Williams-Honda	93
2	(United Kingdom) McLaren-TAG	50
3	(United Kingdom) Lotus-Honda	49
4	(Italy) Ferrari	17
5	(United Kingdom) Benetton-Ford	15

Jim Clark Trophy standings

Pos	Driver	Points
1	(United Kingdom) Jonathan Palmer	61
2	(France) Philippe Streiff	45
3	(France) Pascal Fabre	35
4	(France) Philippe Alliot	25
5	(Italy) Ivan Capelli	19

Colin Chapman Trophy standings

Pos	Constructor	Points
1	(United Kingdom) Tyrrell-Ford	106
2	(France) AGS-Ford	35
3	(France) Lola-Ford	25
4	(United Kingdom) March-Ford	19

- Note: Only the top five positions are included for all four sets of standings.

Previous race: 1987 Hungarian Grand Prix	FIA Formula One World Championship; 1987 season	Next race: 1987 Italian Grand Prix
Previous race: 1986 Austrian Grand Prix	Austrian Grand Prix	Next race: 1997 Austrian Grand Prix
