= Benetton B187 =

Formula One racing car

- Category: Formula One
- Constructor: Benetton
- Designers: Rory Byrne (Chief Designer); Keith Duckworth (Engine Technical Director (Ford-Cosworth)); Geoff Goddard (Chief Engine Designer (Ford-Cosworth))
- Predecessor: B186
- Successor: B188

Technical specifications
- Chassis: Carbon fibre monocoque
- Suspension (front): Double wishbones, pushrods
- Suspension (rear): Double wishbones, pushrods
- Axle track: Front: 1,816 mm (71.5 in); Rear: 1,682 mm (66.2 in)
- Wheelbase: 2,692 mm (106.0 in)
- Engine: Ford TEC, 1,497 cc (91.4 cu in), 120° V6, turbo (4.0 Bar limited), mid-engine, longitudinally mounted
- Transmission: Benetton 6-speed manual
- Weight: 540 kg (1,190 lb)
- Fuel: Mobil
- Tyres: Goodyear

Competition history
- Notable entrants: Benetton Formula Ltd
- Notable drivers: 19. (Italy) Teo Fabi; 20. (Belgium) Thierry Boutsen
- Debut: 1987 Brazilian Grand Prix
- Last event: 1987 Australian Grand Prix
Races	Wins	Podiums	Poles	F/Laps
16	0	2	0	1
- Constructors' Championships: 0
- Drivers' Championships: 0

The Benetton B187 is a Formula One racing car designed by Rory Byrne and raced by the Benetton team in the 1987 Formula One World Championship. The B187 replaced the B186 used in the 1986 season.

== Engine ==
In 1987 Benetton effectively became the Ford works team in F1 as they had exclusive use of the 120°, turbocharged Ford TEC V6 engine (internally the Cosworth designed and built engine was known as the GBA) for 1987, rated at approximately 900 bhp (671 kW; 912 PS).

The B187 was the last of a line of turbo cars produced by Benetton and its predecessor Toleman, dating back to when the latter debuted in F1 in 1981 with the Hart-powered TG181. For 1988, the B187 was replaced by the B188, which was powered by the 3.5 Litre, naturally aspirated Ford DFR V8 engine.

As of 2025, the TEC/GBA V6 turbo is the only turbocharged Formula One engine produced by Ford or Cosworth.

== Competition and engine development history ==
Driven by Belgian Thierry Boutsen and Italian Teo Fabi, the team and the B187 got off to a good start with Boutsen finishing 5th at the season opening Brazilian Grand Prix, but after that the high boost the team ran in order to keep up with their competition saw the reliability of the TEC engine become suspect. However, by running less turbo boost (which hampered speed but also saw the reliability woes go down), by mid-season both Fabi and Boutsen were regularly challenging the top 4 teams of McLaren, Williams, Lotus and Ferrari for podium finishes. Boutsen led the Mexican Grand Prix (the race the team had won in 1986) for 13 laps before being forced to retire.

The 13 laps led in Mexico were the only Formula One Grand Prix laps ever led (officially over the start/finish line) by the Ford turbo engine. Boutsen had led for half a lap on lap 17 in Brazil, but as he never led over the line he was not credited with leading a lap.

Boutsen finished eighth in the Drivers' Championship with 16 points while Fabi, in his last year in F1, finished ninth with 12 points. With a total of 28 points, Benetton finished fifth in the Constructors' Championship.

== Aftermath ==
In 1989, Jackie Stewart drove the B187 as part of a show where he drove a number of race cars, including several Formula One machines. He declared it to be one of the better cars he drove.

== Complete Formula One results ==
(key) (Results in italics indicate fastest lap)

Year	Entrant	Engine	Tyres	Drivers	1	2	3	4	5	6	7	8	9	10	11	12	13	14	15	16	Pts.	WCC
1987	Benetton Formula Ltd	Ford TEC; V6 tc	G		BRA	SMR	BEL	MON	DET	FRA	GBR	GER	HUN	AUT	ITA	POR	ESP	MEX	JPN	AUS	28	5th
1987	Benetton Formula Ltd	Ford TEC; V6 tc	G	(Italy) Teo Fabi	Ret	Ret	Ret	8	Ret	5	6	Ret	Ret	3	7	4	Ret	5	Ret	Ret	28	5th
1987	Benetton Formula Ltd	Ford TEC; V6 tc	G	(Belgium) Thierry Boutsen	5	Ret	Ret	Ret	Ret	Ret	7	Ret	4	4	5	14	16	Ret	5	3	28	5th
