= Benetton B186 =

Formula One racing car by Benetton

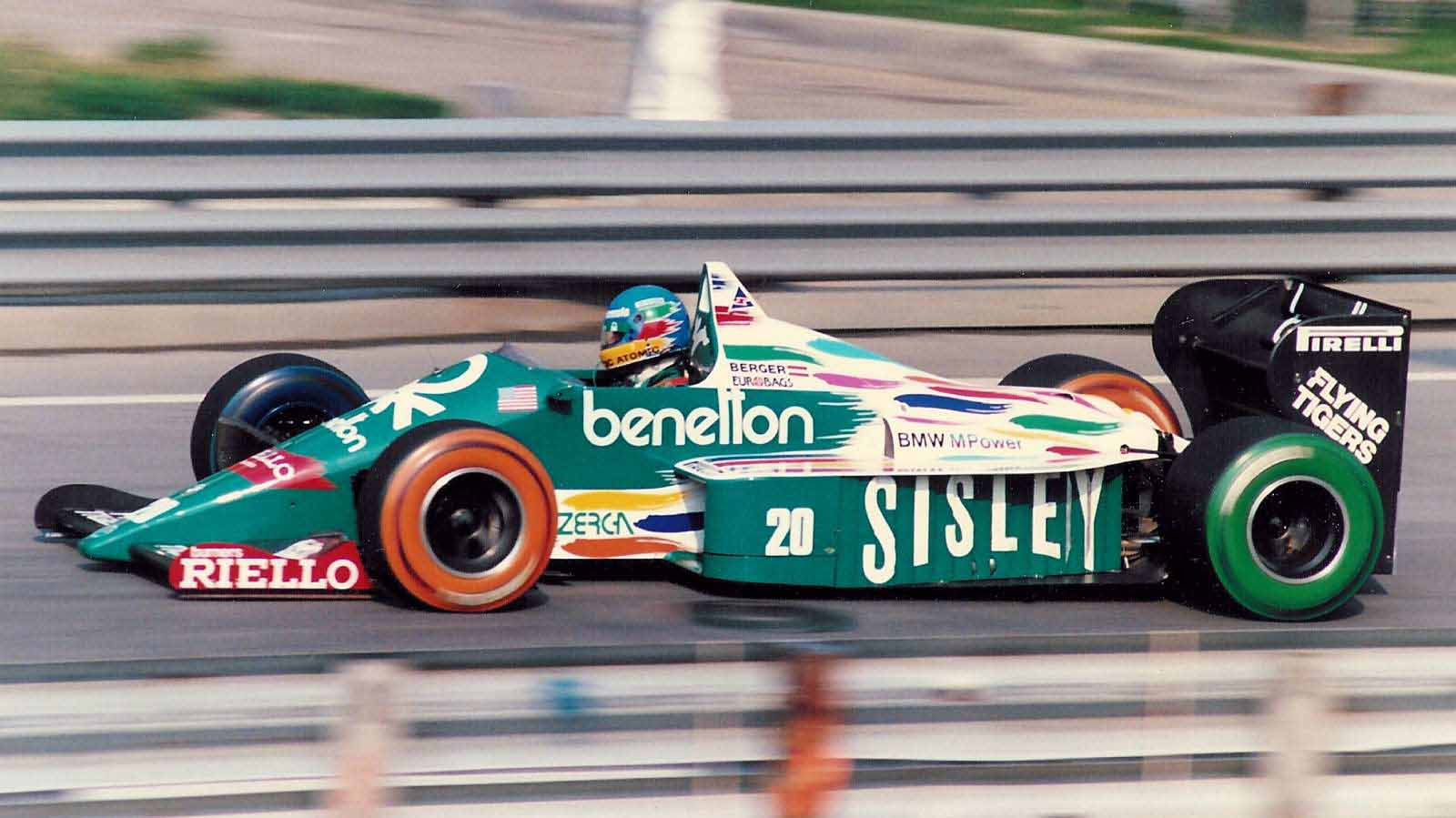
- Gerhard Berger racing the B186 in the 1986 Detroit Grand Prix
- Category: Formula One
- Constructor: Benetton
- Designers: Rory Byrne; Paul Rosche (Engine designer (BMW))
- Predecessor: Toleman TG185
- Successor: B187

Technical specifications
- Chassis: Moulded Carbon fibre composite monocoque
- Suspension (front): Double wishbones, pullrods
- Suspension (rear): Double wishbones, pushrods
- Length: 4,348 mm (171.2 in)
- Width: 1,820 mm (72 in)
- Height: 975 mm (38.4 in)
- Axle track: Front: 1,816 mm (71.5 in); Rear: 1,683 mm (66.3 in)
- Wheelbase: 2,743 mm (108.0 in)
- Engine: BMW M12/13, 1,496 cc (91.3 cu in), Inline 4, turbo, mid-engine, longitudinally mounted
- Transmission: Benetton 6-speed manual
- Power: (qualifying trim) 1,681 brake horsepower (1,254 kW; 1,704 PS) @ 11,000 rpm 1,532 newton-metres (1,130 lbf⋅ft) @ 8,000 rpm (race-spec); 900 brake horsepower (670 kW; 910 PS) @ 11,000 rpm 560 newton-metres (410 lbf⋅ft) @ 8,000 rpm
- Weight: 548 kg (1,208 lb)
- Fuel: BMW Wintershall
- Tyres: Pirelli

Competition history
- Notable entrants: Benetton Formula Ltd
- Notable drivers: 19. (Italy) Teo Fabi; 20. (Austria) Gerhard Berger
- Debut: 1986 Brazilian Grand Prix
- First win: 1986 Mexican Grand Prix
- Last win: 1986 Mexican Grand Prix
- Last event: 1986 Australian Grand Prix
Races	Wins	Podiums	Poles	F/Laps
16	1	2	2	3
- Constructors' Championships: 0
- Drivers' Championships: 0

The Benetton B186 is a Formula One racing car, built and raced by the Benetton team for the 1986 Formula One World Championship. It was the first car to be constructed and raced by Benetton, which had bought the Toleman team at the end of 1985 after several years of sponsoring it and other teams, including Alfa Romeo and Tyrrell.

The B186 was a competitive car: in the hands of drivers Gerhard Berger and Teo Fabi, it set two pole positions, three fastest laps, and was victorious at the 1986 Mexican Grand Prix.

The B186, along with the Brabham BT52, BT55, Arrows A9 and other BMW-engined cars from 1983 to 1986 are some of the most powerful Grand Prix cars ever built. The B186 in particular, being the most competitive of the BMW engined cars that season could produce 1,350+ hp in qualifying trim, and about 900 hp in race trim.

This was the one and only Benetton F1 car powered by BMW engines and the only Benetton F1 car supplied with Pirelli tyres until the B190B in 1991.

== Concept ==
Despite the buyout of the small Toleman team by the financial power of the Benetton Group, its organisation and structure remained largely unchanged. Peter Collins stayed on as team manager, whilst Rory Byrne continued as chief engineer. The planned 1986 chassis, labelled the Toleman TG186, was simply renamed as the Benetton B186. Also, despite the team being Italian owned, they remained based at its Witney headquarters in England. However, Benetton had the resources to pay for a supply of engines produced by a large car manufacturer, BMW, which replaced the privateer Hart 415T units which had powered Toleman's F1 chassis since the team's début in the series in 1981. The focus of BMW for 1986 was the new "lay-down" version of its M12/13 engine, designed for the revolutionary Brabham BT55 chassis, whilst the standard "upright" version was supplied to Benetton and the Arrows team.

Both the BMW M12/13 and Hart engines used the 4 in-line configuration using roughly the same turbo and exhaust set up, meaning that not too many adjustments needed to be made to the general design concept of the B186 in comparison to the previous year's Toleman TG185. However, the chassis was refined and tidied up in several areas, such as the sidepods, to produce more aerodynamic downforce. The B186 was also designed to be structurally stronger than its predecessor, as the 1,400 bhp (1,044 kW; 1,419 PS) turbocharged BMW engine was about 600 bhp (447 kW; 608 PS) more powerful than the turbocharged Hart 415T engine in qualifying and about 200 bhp (149 kW; 203 PS) more in race trim and thus put more stress on the chassis. Indeed, in terms of maximum horsepower, the BMW engines provided to Benetton, Brabham and Arrows were the most powerful in the series. One of the main challenges faced by Byrne and the Benetton design team was to produce a comfortable cockpit for the team's two vastly different drivers: the short (approximately 1.68 metres (5.5 ft)) Teo Fabi and the 1.83 metres (6.0 ft) tall Gerhard Berger.

== Construction ==
The deal between Benetton and Toleman was only agreed in October 1985, leaving precious little time before the first race of the 1986 season on March 23 in Brazil. Byrne only started designing the B186 when the engine-supply deal was made with BMW in the last week of October. Nevertheless, three B186s were built in time for this race, and a further four chassis were completed during the course of the season. As had become standard practice in the sport in the 1980s, the monocoque chassis were constructed from carbon fibre. The first part of the season was chiefly concerned with producing enough spare parts for the existing cars at the expense of chassis development and improvement. All seven chassis raced in the hands of either Fabi or Berger during the course of the year; chassis number 4 was written off by the former in a crash during practice for the Canadian Grand Prix and chassis number 7 was the only race-winning B186, at the Mexican Grand Prix.

The livery of the B186 reflected its ownership: in addition to the Benetton green and team sponsors (principally Sisley and Riello) which covered the front and sidepods of the car, the engine cover was adorned with multi-coloured streaks on a white background. This indicated the Benetton Group's "United Colors of Benetton" brand. The team also ran with tyres that had multi-coloured sidewalls at the Detroit Grand Prix (see infobox picture). Both cars featured the flag of the country that the race was held in next to the rear view mirrors, with the exception of the San Marino Grand Prix where the car ran with the flag of San Marino despite the Imola circuit being in Italy.

== Development ==
The sheer top-end power of the BMW engines (around 1,400 bhp (1,044 kW; 1,419 PS) in qualifying trim, with around 900 bhp (671 kW; 912 PS) for racing) was approximately 50 bhp (37 kW; 51 PS) more than the official factory units supplied to the Brabham team, made possible by modified engine management chips, something that came to a head in Austria when BMW's Paul Rosche demanded to inspect the chips. Luckily the team had kept the originals for just such an emergency and were able to produce them and avoid being in breach of contract as despite being customer engines, they were still supplied and maintained by BMW). This ensured that the B186s were always competitive, as evidenced by the fact that the cars were usually amongst the fastest through the speed traps. Indeed, Berger set the highest top speed of the season at Monza with 352 km/h (219 mph) (Fabi was second quickest on the straight, and also took the pole while Berger started third, the pair split by defending World Champion Alain Prost in his McLaren-TAG which was actually some 20 km/h (12 mph) slower through the speed trap). The speed attained by the BMW powered cars (BMW actually had the top 5 fastest cars through the traps at Monza) was despite what 1980 World Champion and then Haas Lola driver Alan Jones called "Block of flats" rear wings usually designed for maximum downforce on tracks such as Monaco, Jerez and the Hungaroring. However, the handling of the chassis did not match this in the first part of the season as the team struggled with the 'light switch' power delivery of the BMW engine. The handling was eventually sorted but the car was often not on the ultimate pace of the front runners. The cars were also unreliable due to a shortage of spare parts and the strain placed on the chassis by the enormous power of the BMW engine, and less competitive on slower circuits where the power did not count for as much and the turbo lag of the 4 cylinder engine made it slower on low down acceleration than the V6 turbos of Honda, TAG, Ferrari and Renault. The team was also initially disadvantaged by its partnership with the tyre supplier Pirelli, when most of the front running teams were running Goodyears, as neither it nor fellow-Pirelli user Brabham had managed to complete many laps during pre-season testing; the Italian company mostly relying on data from the Ligier team which ran V6 Renault turbos.

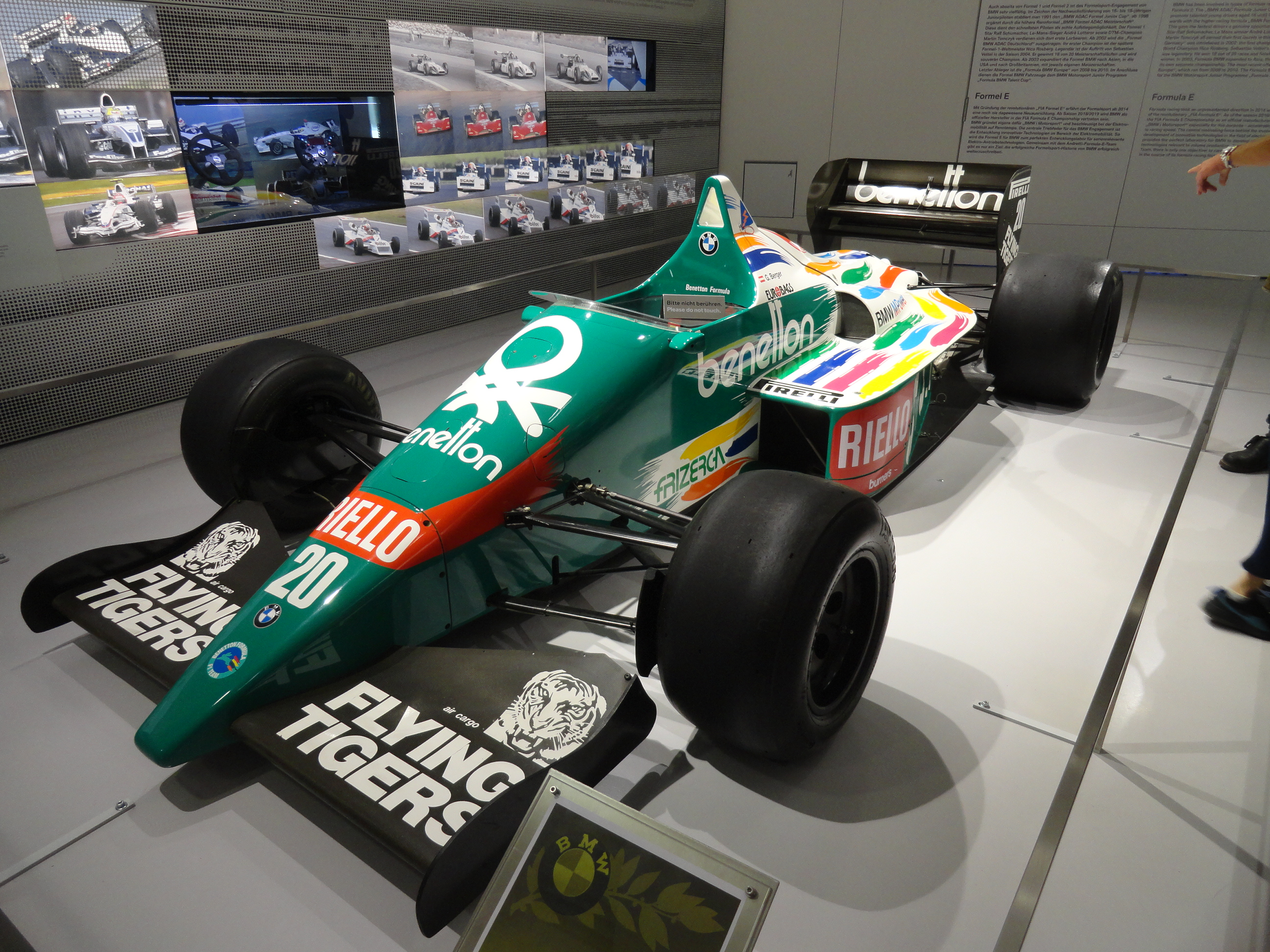
Benetton B186 of Berger in the BMW Museum.

Once the supply of spare parts had been assured by mid-season, the B186s were modified to incorporate a whole array of new aerodynamic features (including front and rear wings and a revised underbody), new suspension packages, and revised setup concepts. The chassis was also strengthened further to cope with the stress caused by the power of the BMW engine. The development package was completed by the arrival of a new rear wing design for the Austrian Grand Prix, where the improved performance of the B186 and the high-speed Österreichring circuit made it the fastest car in the field with Fabi (pole) and Berger occupying the front row of the grid. The car's competitiveness improved throughout the season, particularly during the second half, as a result of this development. It also became more reliable, although this aspect remained suspect throughout the year with a total of nineteen retirements from 32 starts. The competitiveness of the Pirelli tyres also improved, and their relative durability compared to the Goodyears often played to the B186's advantage, exemplified by Berger's winning the 1986 Mexican Grand Prix due to not having to make a pit stop for a fresh set of tyres while most of the main contenders (with the exception of Prost's McLaren) made at least two stops for tyres due to the abrasive surface of the Autódromo Hermanos Rodríguez.

== Racing history ==
"Rory worked with the front wing endplates so we had a kind of ground effect at some tracks. The car was like a bomb at circuits like Spa, Austria and Monza. And the power was unbelievable - even if the turbo delay was terrible. You'd open the throttle at the entry to the corner only to get the power at the exit. And if you missed it by five or 10 metres, there was nothing you could do - you just spun it. The lag was about one or two seconds.
At Zeltweg, down the long straight to the Bosch Kurve, the car was throwing out 1400 bhp and just kept on pushing - you felt like you were sitting on a rocket."

— Gerhard Berger (speaking in 2007) on the B186.

The B186 finished in the points in the first three races of the season, including a podium for Berger at the San Marino Grand Prix. However, the car's underlying speed was blunted by a run of retirements for both drivers, and uncompetitive showings at events run on tight tracks such as the Monaco and Detroit Grands Prix. Nevertheless, Berger, in particular, had emerged as a consistent frontrunner by mid-season, although he was criticised in some quarters for driving with his turbo boost set too high for the car's fuel consumption in the early stages of a race in order to complete "glory runs" near the front, only to drop back later on. The B186 was a very aerodynamically efficient car and enabled it to be most competitive in terms of raw pace at the five high-speed "power circuits" on the calendar: Imola, Spa, Hockenheim, Monza and the Österreichring. In addition to being the fastest car on the straights, the car was also very good through high-speed corners; Berger and Fabi were both running very well at the British Grand Prix at Brands Hatch and the Austrian Grand Prix at the Österreichring. The Austrian event saw the B186s to be significantly faster than the usual frontrunning teams such as Williams, McLaren and Lotus, and the team was set for a dominant 1-2 finish until Fabi over-revved his engine by lifting his rear wheels off the ground on a kerb, causing it to fail several laps later, and home town hero Berger's battery failed, causing him to lose five laps in the pits having a new one fitted. The McLaren and Williams cars- two of the other most aerodynamically efficient cars (although slightly down on power) - were the only other cars able to keep up with the Benettons at the Österreichring. Fabi took a pole position there, and a further one at Monza where problems on the warm-up lap saw him forced to start from pit lane. However, further unreliability and less efficient fuel consumption than rival engines prevented a victory. Berger finished a lap down in 5th while Fabi retired on lap 44 with a tyre blowout.

During the 2nd Qualifying session at Monza, Berger's B186 was speed trapped at a season's fastest 351.22 km/h (218.24 mph) while Fabi was second having been clocked at 349.85 km/h (217.39 mph). Berger's speed trap would be the second fastest recorded of the original turbo era in Formula One (1977-1988), beaten only by the actively suspended Williams-Honda of Nelson Piquet who recorded 352.135 km/h (218.807 mph) in qualifying at Monza for the 1987 race.

Benetton finally won its first Grand Prix in Mexico, the penultimate race of the season. Despite Berger not having the outright fastest package, the durability and choice of compound of his Pirelli tyres meant that he did not need to make a pitstop for fresh ones, in comparison to rivals Nelson Piquet (Williams-Honda), Alain Prost (McLaren-TAG) and Nigel Mansell (Williams-Honda), who all lost time as a result of stops or other mechanical issues. It was generally agreed that the victory was a fitting culmination to Benetton's first season as an F1 constructor, Berger's emerging talent in what was the first of 10 career wins, and a vindication of the potential of the B186. The race would also prove to be the last win for the BMW M12 engine.

Benetton comfortably outperformed fellow-BMW users Brabham and Arrows during 1986, and was usually the quickest team using Pirelli tyres, although the more reliable Ligier team scored more points with their turbocharged Renault V6 engines. This was a surprise to BMW and Pirelli, who had both expected the radical, low-line Brabham BT55 designed by Gordon Murray, to be their fastest customer. The B186 was replaced by the Ford turbo powered B187 for the 1987 season.

== Complete Formula One results ==
(key) (Results in bold indicate pole position; results in italics indicate fastest lap.)

Year	Entrant	Engine	Tyres	Drivers	1	2	3	4	5	6	7	8	9	10	11	12	13	14	15	16	Pts.	WCC
1986	Benetton Formula Ltd	BMW M12/13; S4 tc	**P**		BRA	ESP	SMR	MON	BEL	CAN	DET	FRA	GBR	GER	HUN	AUT	ITA	POR	MEX	AUS	**19**	**6th**
1986	Benetton Formula Ltd	BMW M12/13; S4 tc	**P**	Teo Fabi	10	5	Ret	Ret	7	Ret	Ret	Ret	Ret	Ret	Ret	**Ret**	**Ret**	8	Ret	10	**19**	**6th**
1986	Benetton Formula Ltd	BMW M12/13; S4 tc	**P**	Gerhard Berger	6	6	3	Ret	10	Ret	Ret	Ret	Ret	10	Ret	7	5	Ret	1	Ret	**19**	**6th**

== Current locations ==
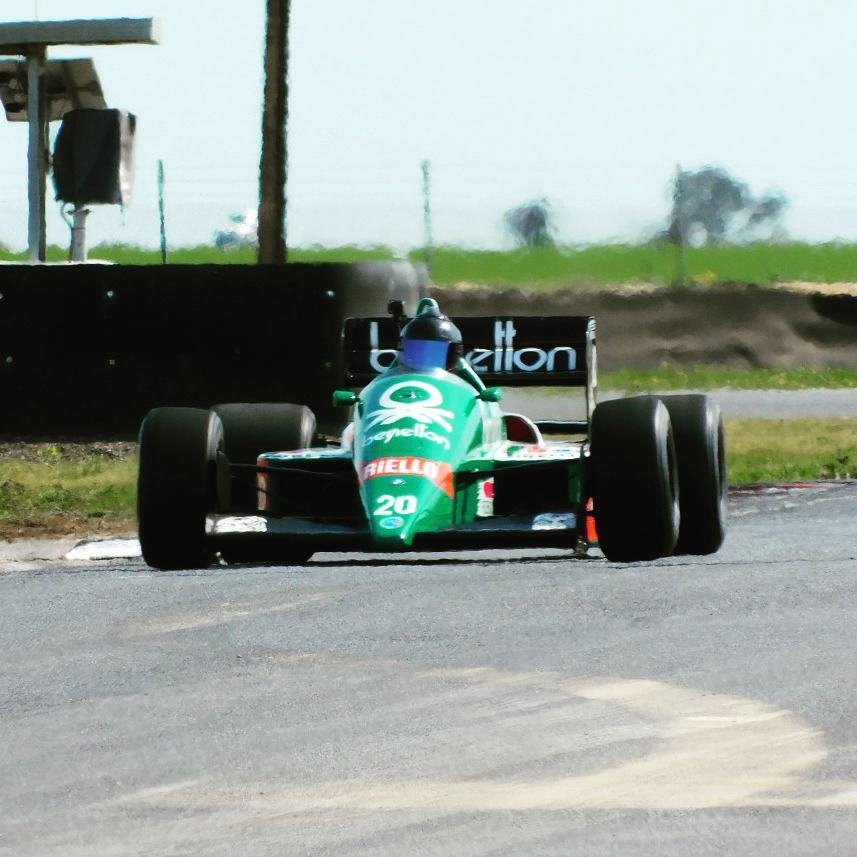
1986 Benetton B186 BMW Formula 1 car (chassis 5) being tested at Mallala Motorsport Park in South Australia in 2016

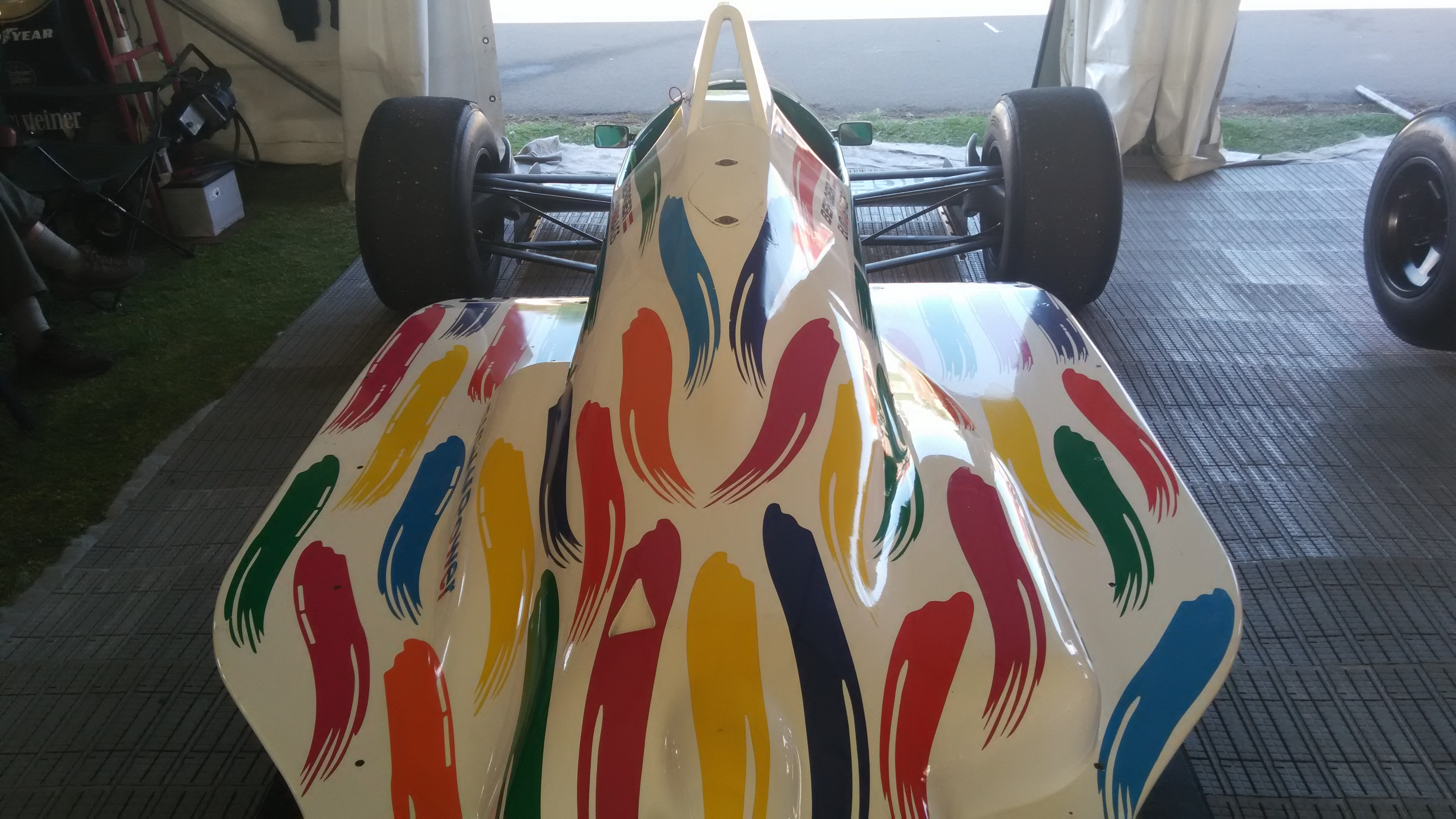
Engine cover of Benetton B186 BMW Formula 1 car

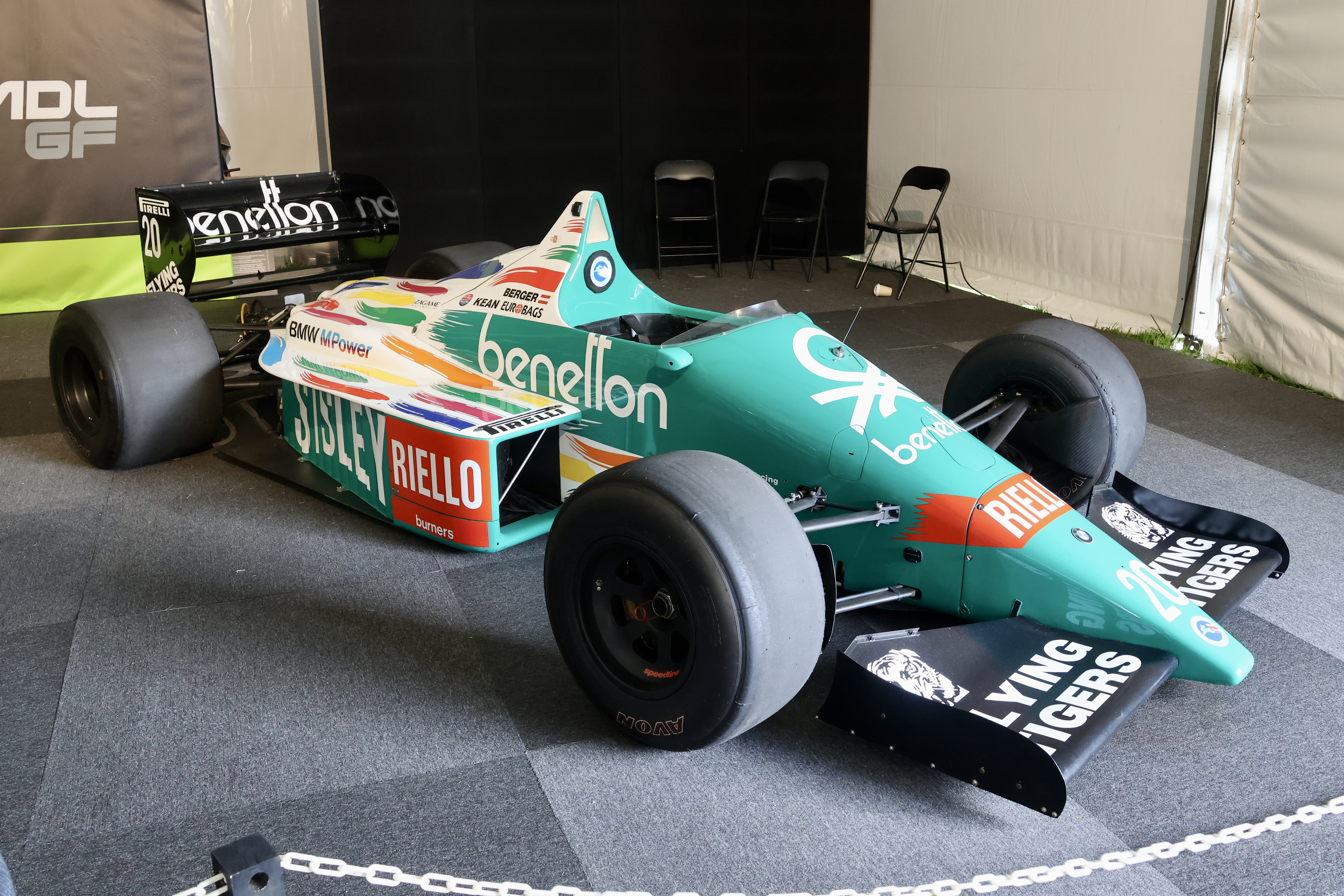
1986 Benetton B186 of Gerhard Berger pictured in 2025

The current known locations of the B186 chassis are as follows:

- 2: on display in the museum at the Mondello Park circuit in Ireland.
- 4: written off by Fabi during practice for the Canadian Grand Prix.
- 5: In Sydney, Australia, rebuilt and competing in historic racing - later sold to a collector in Adelaide, South Australia in late 2015.
- 6: on display at the BMW Museum in Munich.
