= Teo Fabi =

Italian racing driver (born 1955)

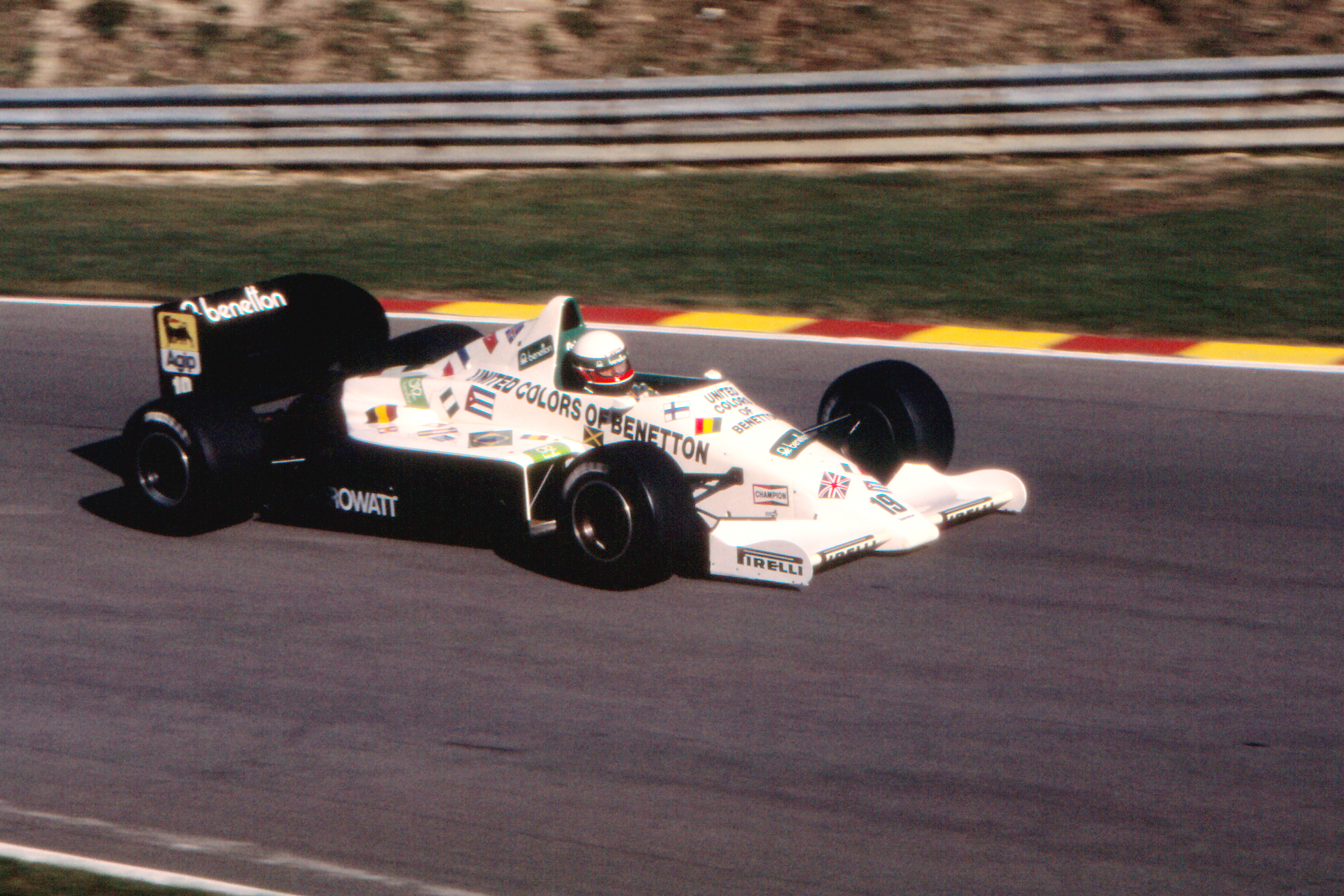
- Teo Fabi during practice for the 1985 European Grand Prix
- Born: Teodorico Fabi; 9 March 1955 (age 71); Milan, Lombardy, Italy
- Relatives: Corrado Fabi (brother)

Formula One World Championship career
- Nationality: (Italy) Italian
- Active years: 1982, 1984–1987
- Team(s): Toleman, Brabham, Benetton
- Entries: 71 (64 starts)
- Championships: 0
- Wins: 0
- Podiums: 2
- Career points: 23
- Pole positions: 3
- Fastest laps: 2
- First entry: 1982 South African Grand Prix
- Last entry: 1987 Australian Grand Prix

World Sportscar Championship career
- Years active: 1979–1983, 1991
- Teams: BMW, Lancia, Martini, Jaguar
- Starts: 23
- Championships: 1 (1991) (Note: The World Endurance Championship for Drivers was only held from 1981 onwards.)
- Wins: 2
- Podiums: 10
- Poles: 6
- Fastest laps: 2

Champ Car career
- 118 races run over 10 years
- Best finish: 2nd (1983)
- First race: 1983 Dixie 200 (Atlanta)
- Last race: 1996 Bosch Spark Plug Grand Prix (Nazareth)
- First win: 1983 Pocono 500 (Pocono)
- Last win: 1989 Red Roof Inns 200 (Mid-Ohio)
Wins	Podiums	Poles
5	14	10

24 Hours of Le Mans career
- Years: 1980, 1982–1983, 1991–1993
- Teams: Lancia, Martini, Jaguar, Toyota, Peugeot
- Best finish: 2nd (1993)
- Class wins: 0

Championship titles
- 1983; 1979: Pocono 500; NZ Formula Pacific

Awards
- 1983; 1983: CART Rookie of the Year; Indy 500 Rookie of the Year

Teodorico "Teo" Fabi (born 9 March 1955) is an Italian former racing driver, who competed in Formula One from 1982 to 1987. In sportscar racing, Fabi won the World Sportscar Championship in 1991 with Jaguar.

Born and raised in Milan, Fabi is the older brother of former Formula One driver Corrado Fabi. He claimed pole position in his rookie year at the 1983 Indianapolis 500; he was the last rookie to win the pole position until 2025. At the 1984 Indianapolis 500, Fabi became the last active Formula One driver to race at the event until Fernando Alonso in 2017.

== Early racing ==
Fabi was European Karting Champion in 1975 and followed that up with the European Formula Ford 1600 title in 1977.

== Open wheel racing ==
=== Formula car racing ===
==== European Formula Three ====
Fabi competed in European Formula Three in 1978 for Forti Corse in a March-Toyota. He contested seven races for wins at Circuit Zolder, Dijon-Prenois and Autodromo Vallelunga Piero Taruffi. He finished fourth in points with 45.

==== European Formula Two ====
Fabi then competed in European Formula Two in 1979 for March Racing in a March 792-BMW. His best finish was second at Circuit Park Zandvoort. He scored 13 points overall.

Fabi returned to the series in 1980 for the ICI Roloil Racing Team in a March 802-BMW. He scored three wins, at the Jim Clark Rennen at Hockenheimring, the Eifelrennen at Nürburgring and the Preis Baden-Württemberg at Hockenheimring. He qualified on pole at the Grote Prijs van België Formel 2 at Circuit Zolder and the Preis Baden-Württemberg at Hockenheimring, and set fastest lap in the latter on the way to a victory. Fabi ended the season third in points, with 38 points.

==== Formula One ====
Fabi moved to Formula One in 1982, driving the No. 36 Candy Toleman TG181C-Hart 415T. The team had only qualified twice the previous year, and the season got off to a difficult start when the season-opening South African Grand Prix was disrupted by a drivers' strike. Under pressure from Toleman manager Alex Hawkridge, Fabi was the only driver to break the strike (Jochen Mass took no part from the start). His place was then jeopardised when Candy switched support to Tyrrell, but he saw out the season. The TG181C was uncompetitive and the team largely focused on lead driver Derek Warwick. This resulted in Fabi only qualifying for six races out of a possible 14. He qualified for the San Marino Grand Prix, due to the FISA–FOCA war which meant that only 14 cars attempted to qualify for the race. In the race Fabi finished seventh, eight laps down. Fabi qualified for the Belgian Grand Prix, starting and finishing twenty-first. He then failed to qualify at the Monaco Grand Prix before skipping both the Detroit Grand Prix and the Canadian Grand Prix. He failed to qualify at the German Grand Prix and the Caesars Palace Grand Prix. His best finish in the remaining races was twentieth at the Austrian Grand Prix, and he left Formula One at the end of the season.

Fabi's Indy car season in 1983 rekindled Formula One teams' interest. With help from Italian dairy company Parmalat, which insisted on having an Italian driver in the team, he joined the Brabham team in 1984 to drive the No. 2 Brabham BT53-BMW as the number two driver to reigning World Champion Nelson Piquet. He also continued to drive in the CART/PPG World Series for Forsythe Racing and missed three Grands Prix. In those races his younger brother, Corrado Fabi, drove in his place. The mixed approach led to disappointing results in both categories and mid-season saw Fabi decide to concentrate solely on Formula One. Prior to the change, Fabi's best finish was ninth at the 1984 French Grand Prix and his best start was a sixth at the South African Grand Prix. His performances improved, including a strong run at Italian Grand Prix where he ran second behind Piquet in the first half of the race before retiring with engine failure, the major problem for Brabham during the year. Fabi scored points on three occasions, with a best finish of third at the Detroit Grand Prix and was twelfth in points with nine.

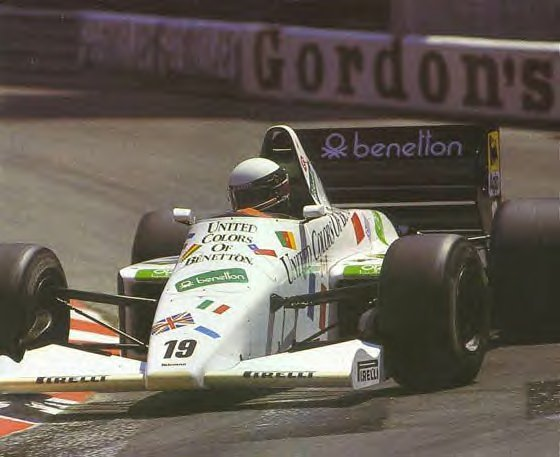
Fabi driving a Toleman TG185 in 1985

Brabham dropped Fabi for 1985 and he initially struggled to find a team. His profile in Italy allowed him to rejoin Toleman (now heavily sponsored by the Benetton Group) when they belatedly joined the championship at the Monaco Grand Prix. Fabi drove the No. 19 Toleman Motorsports Group Toleman TG185-Hart 415T. The season got off to a late start because Toleman had lost their supply of tyres when Michelin pulled out of F1 at the end of 1984. They could not access Goodyear tyres and Pirelli would not supply them as they had broken a contract with the Italian company in mid-1984 and gone with Michelin. Benetton bought both Toleman and the Spirit team and transferred Spirit's Pirelli contract to Toleman. The late start meant the TG185 was never truly reliable, but Fabi's speed lead to the marque's only pole position, at the German Grand Prix, at the new Nürburgring. Fabi's race was ruined when a slipping clutch meant he was well down the order at the end of the first lap. The team failed to score any points and Fabi only finished twice (even these races were disrupted by mechanical problems). 1980 World Champion Alan Jones (who also used a Hart engine in his Haas Lola) described it late in the season as "sending a boy to do a man's job" in F1 against the likes of Renault, Ferrari, BMW, Honda and TAG-Porsche. Fabi's best finish was twelfth at the Italian Grand Prix and he would again go unranked due to not scoring points.

Fabi drove for Benetton Formula in the No. 19 Benetton B186-BMW M12 after Toleman were fully taken over before the 1986 season to become Benetton, with powerful (1,400 bhp (1,044 kW; 1,419 PS) qualifying) engines, and talented young Austrian Gerhard Berger joining. The Benetton was fast but fragile with difficult Pirelli tyres and Fabi often qualified better than he raced. He managed pole position at the Austrian Grand Prix and the Italian Grand Prix but his best finish was fifth at the Spanish Grand Prix. He gained a reputation for being most competitive on faster circuits and struggling on slower, more technical courses. Both pole positions were at the two fastest circuits on the 1986 calendar, the Österreichring and the Autodromo Nazionale Monza. He ended the season fifteenth in points.

Fabi continued at Benetton Formula in 1987, driving the No. 19 B187-Ford Cosworth GBA V6 and was joined by Thierry Boutsen. While the package was not as fast, it was more consistent, allowing him to score points on five occasions. The Ford V6 suffered from unreliability early in the season due to the use of higher turbo boost in an effort to keep up with the Honda-powered cars from Williams and Lotus and the TAG-engined McLarens. When the boost was reduced from around mid-year, reliability returned but speed was sacrificed. Fabi had a best finish of third, at the Austrian Grand Prix, held at one of Fabi's favourite tracks, the Österreichring. During the season Benetton signed young Italian charger Alessandro Nannini, for the 1988 season to partner Boutsen. In Fabi's final Formula One race, at the Australian Grand Prix, he took his frustration of not being able to find a drive for 1988 out on Boutsen, spending many laps deliberately blocking his teammate and not letting himself be lapped despite the blue flags and orders from the team to move over. When Boutsen confronted Fabi after the race, the Italian angrily told him to "come back and see me when you have a pole position". (Boutsen was third in this race, and ended his career following the 1993 season with three wins and one pole position). Fabi ended the season ranked a career-best ninth.

Fabi competed in 71 Formula One Grands Prix. He scored three pole positions, two fastest laps and two thirds in his career, scoring a total of 23 points.

=== Indy car racing ===
==== CART/Champ Car World Series ====
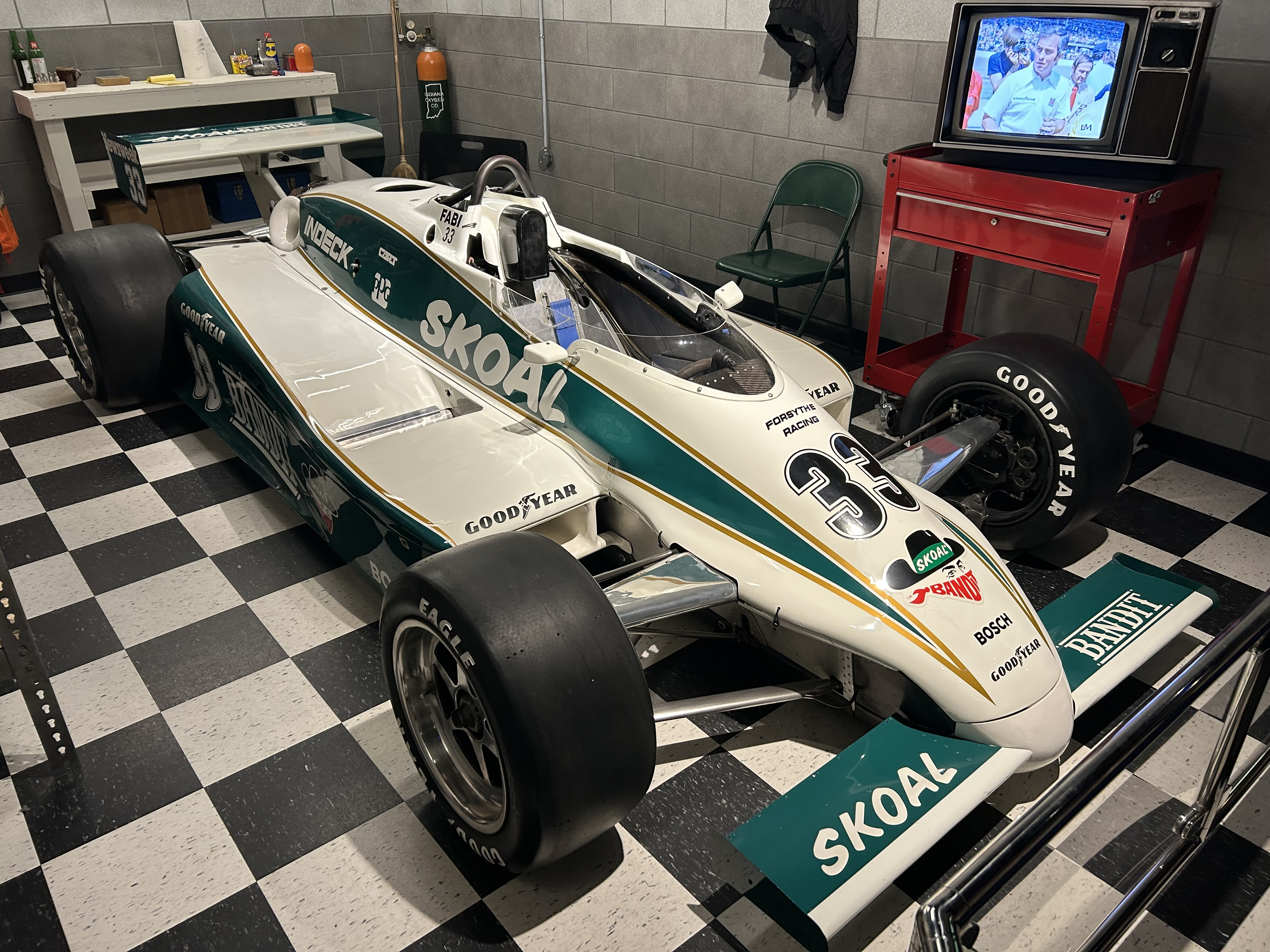
Fabi's 1983 Indianapolis 500 pole-winning March 83C

Fabi joined the CART/PPG World Series in 1983 for Forsythe Racing in the No. 33 Skoal Bandit March 83C-Cosworth DFX. He made his Indy car debut at the Kraco Dixie 200 at Atlanta International Speedway, starting ninth and finishing 20th after retiring after 41 laps due to suspension failure. At the Indianapolis 500, Fabi qualified on pole with a track record speed of 207.395 mph for four laps, and a one-lap record of 208.049 mph. In the process, he became the first rookie to qualify on the pole position since Walt Faulkner in 1950. He led 23 of the first 47 laps before retiring during his second pit stop due to a broken fuel filter. Fabi was credited with 26th place and won the rookie of the year award. Fabi then qualified with pole position at the Dana Rex Mays Classic at the Wisconsin State Fairgrounds Park Speedway and finished fourth. He won the Domino's Pizza 500 at Pocono International Raceway and then the Escort Radar Warnings 200 at Mid-Ohio Sports Car Course. He moved into second place in the championship behind veteran Al Unser. He then won the Cribari Wines 300K at Laguna Seca Raceway and the championship was decided at the season-ending Miller High Life 150 at Phoenix International Raceway Fabi won pole position, led 138 of 150 laps and won the race to score 22 points. Unser finished fourth for 16 points and took the championship. Fabi won the series' rookie of the year award.

In 1984, Fabi returned with Forsythe Racing in their No. 33 Skoal Bandit March 84C-Cosworth DFX. He qualified third at the Toyota Grand Prix of Long Beach and was second at the Dana Jimmy Bryan 150 at Phoenix International Raceway. He was 18th and 19th due to a crash at Long Beach and a blown engine at Phoenix. At the Indianapolis 500, Fabi qualified 14th and retired in 24th place due to a fuel system failure after 104 laps and leading for 14 laps. His best finish was third at the Stroh's/G.I. Joe's 200 at Portland International Raceway. Following the Budweiser Cleveland Grand Prix, Fabi left Indy car racing to concentrate on the Formula One season. Fabi ended his partial season 25th in points.

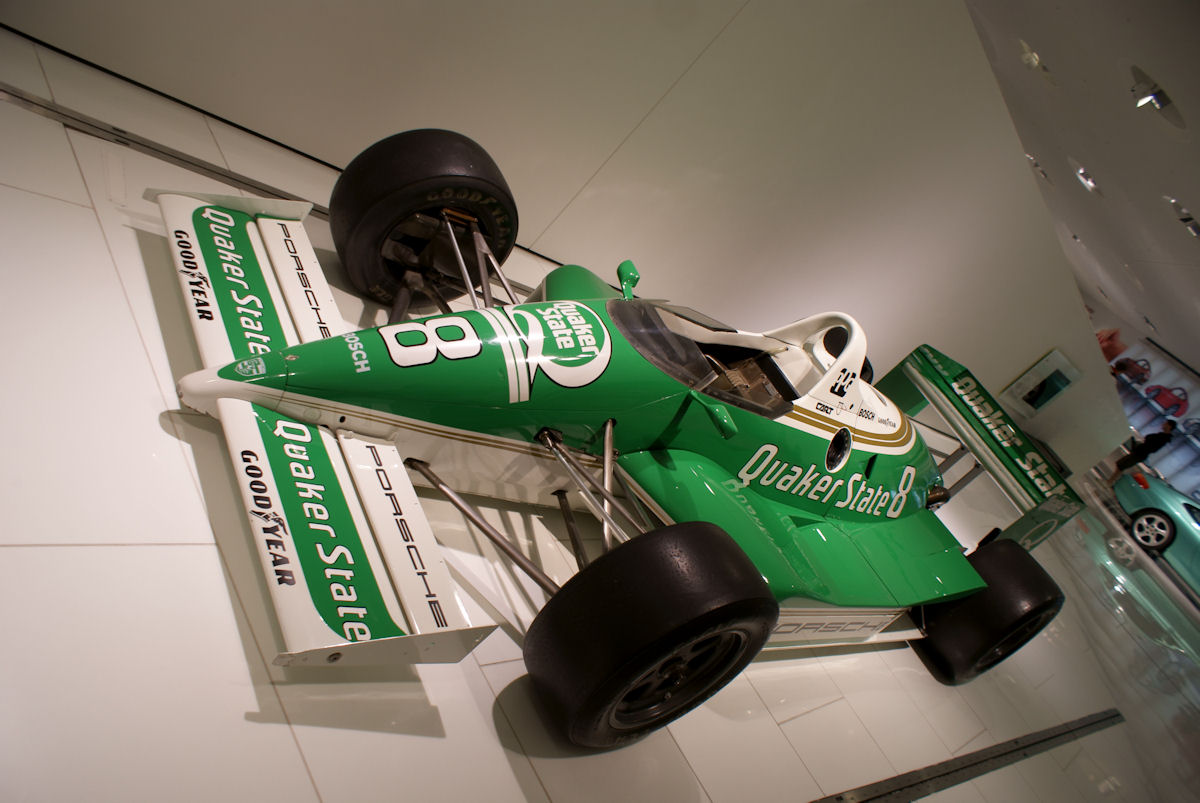
The March-Porsche Fabi drove for the 1988 CART season

Brabham dropped Fabi for 1985 Fabi returned to Indy car racing in 1988 with Porsche Motorsports in their No. 8 Quaker State March 88P-Porsche Indy V8. The Porsche engine was less competitive than the Ilmor-Chevrolet and Cosworth engines. Despite the setbacks, Fabi managed a best finish of fourth at the Bosch Spark Plug Grand Prix at Pennsylvania International Raceway. Fabi's return to the Indianapolis 500 was also a disappointment as he qualified 17th and finished 30th after losing a wheel after 30 laps. He ended the season ranked tenth with 44 points.

In 1989, Fabi drove the No. 8 Quaker State March 89P-Porsche Indy V8. The engine and team began to compete regularly for wins with Fabi qualifying on pole at the Budweiser/G.I. Joe's 200 at Portland International Raceway and the Red Roof Inns 200 at Mid-Ohio Sports Car Course where he led for 71 of 84 laps to get what would be his last Indy car victory. The engine also began to be competitive on the ovals, as highlighted by a second at the Marlboro 500 at Michigan International Speedway. At the Indianapolis 500, Fabi qualified 13th and again finished 30th after retiring due to ignition problems after 23 laps. After his Mid-Ohio victory Fabi moved into third place in points. At the final two races of the season, the Firestone Indy 225 at Pennsylvania International Raceway and the Champion Spark Plug 300K at Laguna Seca Raceway, Fabi retired due to handling issues at Nazareth and a crash at Laguna Seca. At the end of the season, he was fourth with 141 points.

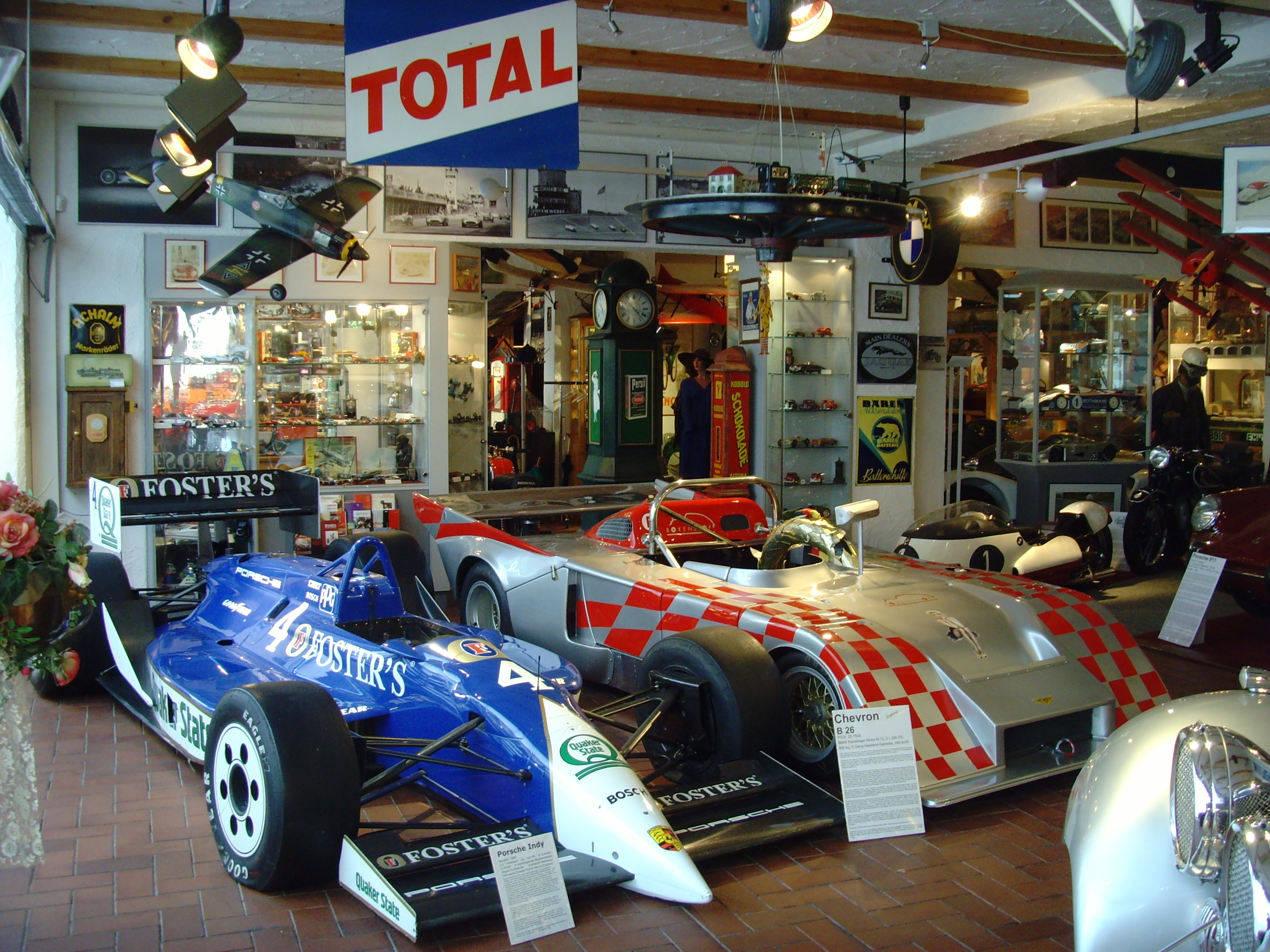
Fabi's March 90P-Porsche (left) on display in Germany

Fabi returned with Porsche Motorsports in 1990 to drive their No. 4 Foster's-Quaker State March 90P-Porsche Indy V8. Prior to the start of the season Porsche was going to build an all carbon fibre chassis with their constructor, March Engineering. In January, Porsche's competitors voted against the use of the car and as a result Porsche had to use the year-old March 89P chassis. Fabi qualified seventh at the Toyota Grand Prix of Long Beach, but finished tenth. A new March 90P was used at the Indianapolis 500 and Fabi started 23rd and retired in 18th due to transmission problems after 162 laps. Fabi later qualified on pole position for the Texaco/Havoline Grand Prix of Denver.He led one lap but crashed after seven laps and finished 27th. Fabi achieved a best finish of third, at the Marlboro Grand Prix at the Meadowlands, at Meadowlands Sports Complex, and ended the season fourteenth in points. At the end of the season, Porsche withdrew from Indy car racing so Fabi moved to the World Sportscar Championship in 1991 and won the championship.

In 1992, Fabi drove at the ITT Automotive Grand Prix of Detroit at Belle Isle Park to substitute for Mario Andretti who suffered injuries at the Indianapolis 500. He drove for Newman-Haas Racing in their No. 2 Texaco Havoline/K Mart Lola T92/00-Ford Cosworth XB. He qualified third and finished sixth.

Fabi moved to Hall VDS Racing for 1993 in the No. 8 Pennzoil Lola T93/00-Ilmor-Chevrolet Indy V8 265C, achieving a best finish of fourth at the Toyota Grand Prix of Long Beach. After the race, Fabi was third in points, ten points out of the lead behind Nigel Mansell and Mario Andretti. At the Indianapolis 500, Fabi started 17th and finished ninth. After Long Beach, his best finish was sixth, at the Marlboro 500, at Michigan International Speedway. Fabi ended up 11th with 64 points.

For 1994, Fabi drove for the re-organized Hall Racing (VDS Racing withdrew from the team following 1993) in the No. 11 Pennzoil Reynard 94i-Ilmor Indy V8. During the season Fabi's best finishes were a trio of thirds, at the ITT Automotive Grand Prix of Detroit, the Marlboro 500 at Michigan International Speedway and the Texaco/Havoline 200 at Road America. Fabi qualified 24th for the Indianapolis 500 and finished seventh, his best result in the race. He was ninth in points with 79.

In 1995 Fabi returned with Forsythe Racing in the No. 33 Combustion Engineering/Indeck Reynard 95i-Ford Cosworth XB. He had a best finish of third, at the Toyota Grand Prix of Long Beach. At the Indianapolis 500 Fabi started fifteenth and finished eighth. Fabi won pole at the Miller Genuine Draft 200 at the Milwaukee Mile, led for 27 laps but finished fourth, two laps down. At the New England 200 at New Hampshire Motor Speedway, Fabi qualified second and led for 42 laps, only to finish 12th, four laps down. He also started second at the Marlboro 500 at Michigan International Speedway, and finished fourth. He ended the season ninth with 83 points.

Fabi was unable to get a car to drive for 1996, as Forsythe Racing hired Indy Lights driver Greg Moore. He was to drive for PacWest Racing in their No. 21 Motorola Reynard 96i-Ford Cosworth XD to replace Mark Blundell, who was injured at the IndyCar Rio 400 at Autódromo de Jacarepaguá. He did compete in the Toyota Grand Prix of Long Beach and the Bosch Spark Plug Grand Prix at Nazareth Speedway. In both races, he qualified 19th, and finished 18th at Long Beach. Blundell returned for the U.S. 500 at Michigan International Speedway and Fabi was withdrawn from the car. Fabi scored no points for the first time in his career and finished 36th.

== Sports car racing ==
=== Can-Am ===
Fabi competed in Can-Am in 1981 for Newman Freeman Racing in their No. 6 Budweiser March 817-Chevrolet V8. He took four wins, at Mosport Park (twice), Mid-Ohio Sports Car Course and Laguna Seca Raceway. He finish second in points with 456 points.

=== World Sportscar Championship ===
Fabi began competing in the World Sportscar Championship in 1980 for Scuderia Lancia Corse in the No. 51 Lancia Beta Monte Carlo-Lancia 1.4L Turbo I4 for the Group 5 class at the 24 Hours of Le Mans with Hans Heyer and Bernard Darniche. In the race, the car started twenty-sixth but retired after six laps with oil pump failure.

Fabi returned to the series in 1982 for Martini Racing in the No. 51 Lancia LC1-Lancia 1.4L Turbo I4. Fabi would win the 1000km of Nürburgring at the Nürburgring with Michele Alboreto and Riccardo Patrese. Fabi also competed in the Group 6 class of the 24 Hours of Le Mans in the same car with Alboreto and Rolf Stommelen. The car qualified fourth but finished thirty-fourth after retiring on their ninety-second lap due to engine failure. He ended the season ranked fourth with 66 points.

In 1983, Fabi drove the No. 4 Martini Porsche 956 in the No. 4 Lancia LC2-Ferrari 268C 2.6L Turbo V8. He won the 1000km of Imola at the Autodromo Dino Ferrari with Hans Heyer. The team eventually had involvement from Lancia and the car became a Lancia LC2-Lancia 268C 2.6L Turbo V8 and he drove this car in the 24 Hours of Le Mans with Michele Alboreto and Alessandro Nannini in the C Class. The car started second but finished forty-sixth after retiring after 27 laps with gearbox failure. Fabi then drove the team's second car, No. 5 which started fourth and finished thirty-sixth after retiring after 121 laps due to fuel pressure problems. Fabi's win at Imola did not count towards the World Endurance Championship for Drivers and as a result he was unranked in the championship.

After the 1990 IndyCar season proved to be a backward step, Fabi returned to the series in 1991 with Tom Walkinshaw Racing/Silk Cut Jaguar in the No. 34 Jaguar XJR-12 and Jaguar XJR-14. Fabi won the Castrol BRDC Empire Trophy at the Silverstone Circuit with Derek Warwick. At the 24 Hours of Le Mans, Fabi drove the team's Jaguar XJR-12-Jaguar 7.4L V12 with Bob Wollek and Kenny Acheson for the C2 class. In the race, the car started twenty-seventh and finished third with 358 laps complete. Fabi went on to win the World Endurance Championship for Drivers with 86 points.

Fabi competed in the 24 Hours of Le Mans for Toyota Team Tom's in the No. 8 Toyota TS010-Toyota RV10 3.5L V10 with Jan Lammers and Andy Wallace in the C1 Class. They started fourth and finished eighth, with 331 laps completed, and fifth in class. Fabi ended the season twenty-seventh in points with eight points.

=== 1993 24 Hours of Le Mans ===
The 1993 24 Hours of Le Mans was held without a championship for points to go to after the collapse of the World Sportscar Championship and as a result the race was run as a standalone event. Fabi drove for Peugeot Talbot Sport in their No. 1 Peugeot 905 Evo 1B-Peugeot SA35 3.5L V10 with Thierry Boutsen and Yannick Dalmas in the C1 Class. They started and finished second overall, with 374 laps completed, and were also second in class.

== Racing record ==
=== Career summary ===
Season	Series	Team	Races	Wins	Poles	F/Laps	Podiums	Points	Position
1977	FIA European Formula 3	Teo Fabi	1	0	0	0	0	0	NC
1977	Italian Formula Ford 2000	Forti Corse	?	?	?	?	?	?	**1st**
1978	Italian Formula Three		?	?	?	?	?	36	4th
1978	FIA European Formula 3	Astra Racing Team	14	3	2	3	7	45	4th
1979	New Zealand Formula Pacific		10	6	8	?	8	166	**1st**
1979	European Formula Two	March Engineering	12	0	0	0	1	13	10th
1979	BMW M1 Procar Championship	BMW Motorsport	1	0	0	0	0	0	NC
1979	World Sportscar Championship	BMW Motorsport	1	0	0	0	0	0	NC
1980	European Formula Two	ICI Racing Team	12	3	2	2	5	38	**3rd**
1980	All-Japan Formula Two		?	?	?	?	?	3	17th
1980	World Sportscar Championship	Lancia Corse	1	0	0	0	0	0	NC
1981	All-Japan Formula Two		?	?	?	?	?	10	12th
1981	Can-Am	Newman/Paul Newman Racing	4	4	0	0	4	0	NC
1981	World Sportscar Championship	Hugues de Chaunac	2	0	0	0	0	18	132nd
1982	World Sportscar Championship	Martini Racing	8	1	1	1	4	66	4th
1982	Formula One	Candy Toleman Motorsport	7	0	0	0	0	0	NC
1982	Formula One	Toleman Group Motorsport	7	0	0	0	0	0	NC
1983	PPG Indy Car World Series	Forsythe Racing	13	4	6	1	7	146	**2nd**
1983	World Sportscar Championship	Martini Racing	4	0	1	0	0	4	64th
1984	Formula One	MRD International	12	0	0	0	1	9	12th
1984	PPG Indy Car World Series	Forsythe Racing	7	0	0	0	1	15	25th
1985	Formula One	United Colors of Benetton Toleman	13	0	1	0	0	0	NC
1986	Formula One	Benetton BMW Team	16	0	2	1	0	2	15th
1987	Formula One	Benetton Formula	16	0	0	1	1	12	9th
1988	PPG Indy Car World Series	Porsche Motorsports	15	0	0	0	0	44	10th
1989	PPG Indy Car World Series	Porsche Motorsports	15	1	2	0	4	141	4th
1990	PPG Indy Car World Series	Porsche Motorsports	16	0	1	0	1	33	14th
1991	World Sportscar Championship	Silk Cut Jaguar	7	1	4	1	6	86	**1st**
1992	PPG Indy Car World Series	Newman/Haas Racing	1	0	0	0	0	8	21st
1992	24 Hours of Le Mans	Toyota Team Tom's	1	0	0	0	0	N/A	8th
1993	PPG Indy Car World Series	Hall VDS Racing	16	0	0	0	0	64	11th
1993	24 Hours of Le Mans	Peugeot Talbot Sport	1	0	0	0	0	N/A	**2nd**
1994	PPG Indy Car World Series	Hall Racing	16	0	0	0	0	79	9th
1995	PPG Indy Car World Series	Forsythe Racing	17	0	1	2	1	83	9th
1996	PPG Indy Car World Series	PacWest Racing	2	0	0	0	0	0	36th

=== Complete European Formula 3 results ===
(key) (Races in bold indicate pole position) (Races in italics indicate fastest lap)

Year	Team	Engine	1	2	3	4	5	6	7	8	9	10	11	12	13	14	15	16	Pos.	Pts
1977	Teo Fabi	Toyota	LEC	NÜR	ZAN	ZOL	ÖST	IMO	PER	MNZ	CET	KNU	KAS	DON	JAR	VLL; Ret			NC	0
1978	Astra Racing Team	Toyota	ZAN; 3	NÜR; 2	ÖST; DNQ	ZOL; 1	IMO; Ret	NÜR; Ret	**DIJ**; 1	MNZ; Ret	PER; Ret	MAG; 3	KNU; DNQ	KAR; 3	DON; Ret	KAS; Ret	JAR	**VLL**; 1	4th	45

=== Complete European Formula Two Championship results ===
(key) (Races in bold indicate pole position; races in italics indicate fastest lap)

Year	Entrant	Chassis	Engine	1	2	3	4	5	6	7	8	9	10	11	12	Pos.	Pts
1979	March Engineering	March 792	BMW	SIL; Ret	HOC; 6	THR; Ret	NÜR; 14	VAL; Ret	MUG; 4	PAU; Ret	HOC; Ret	ZAN; 2	PER; 4	MIS; 11	DON; Ret	10th	13
1980	ICI Racing Team	March 802	BMW	THR; 7	HOC; 1	NÜR; 1	VAL; Ret	PAU; Ret	SIL; 4	**ZOL**; Ret	MUG; 3	ZAN; 3	PER; 8	MIS; Ret	**HOC**; 1	**3rd**	**38**

=== Complete Formula One results ===
(key) (Races in bold indicate pole position; races in italics indicate fastest lap)

Year	Entrant	Chassis	Engine	1	2	3	4	5	6	7	8	9	10	11	12	13	14	15	16	WDC	Pts
1982	Candy Toleman Motorsport	Toleman TG181B	Hart 415T 1.5 L4t	RSA; DNQ	BRA; DNQ															NC	0
1982	Candy Toleman Motorsport	Toleman TG181C	Hart 415T 1.5 L4t			USW; DNQ														NC	0
1982	Toleman Group Motorsport	Toleman TG181C	Hart 415T 1.5 L4t				SMR; NC	BEL; Ret	MON; DNPQ	DET	CAN	NED; DNQ	GBR; Ret	FRA; Ret	GER; DNQ	AUT; Ret	SUI; Ret	ITA; Ret	CPL; DNQ	NC	0
1984	MRD International	Brabham BT53	BMW M12/13 1.5 L4t	BRA; Ret	RSA; Ret	BEL; Ret	SMR; Ret	FRA; 9	MON	CAN	DET; 3	DAL	GBR; Ret	GER; Ret	AUT; 4	NED; 5	ITA; Ret	EUR; Ret	POR	12th	9
1985	United Colors of Benetton Toleman	Toleman TG185	Hart 415T 1.5 L4t	BRA	POR	SMR	MON; Ret	CAN; Ret	DET; Ret	FRA; 14^{†}	GBR; Ret	**GER**; Ret	AUT; Ret	NED; Ret	ITA; 12	BEL; Ret	EUR; Ret	RSA; Ret	AUS; Ret	NC	0
1986	Benetton BMW Team	Benetton B186	BMW M12/13 1.5 L4t	BRA; 10	ESP; 5	SMR; Ret	MON; Ret	BEL; 7	CAN; Ret	DET; Ret	FRA; Ret	GBR; Ret	GER; Ret	HUN; Ret	**AUT**; Ret	**ITA**; Ret	POR; 8	MEX; Ret	AUS; 10	15th	2
1987	Benetton Formula	Benetton B187	Ford TEC 1.5 V6t	BRA; Ret	SMR; Ret	BEL; Ret	MON; 8	DET; Ret	FRA; 5	GBR; 6	GER; Ret	HUN; Ret	AUT; 3	ITA; 7	POR; 4^{†}	ESP; Ret	MEX; 5	JPN; Ret	AUS; Ret	9th	12

^{†} Driver did not finish the Grand Prix, but was classified as he completed over 90% of the race distance.

=== Complete 24 Hours of Le Mans results ===
Year	Class	No	Tyres	Car	Team	Co-Drivers	Laps	Pos.	Class Pos.
1980	Gr.5	51	P	Lancia Beta Monte Carlo; Lancia 1.4L Turbo I4	(Italy) Scuderia Lancia Corse	(Germany) Hans Heyer (France) Bernard Darniche	6	DNF	DNF
1982	Gr.6	51	P	Lancia LC1; Lancia 1.4L Turbo I4	(Italy) Martini Racing	(Italy) Michele Alboreto (Germany) Rolf Stommelen	92	DNF	DNF
1983	C	4	D	Lancia LC2; Ferrari 268C 2.6L Turbo V8	(Italy) Martini Lancia	(Italy) Michele Alboreto (Italy) Alessandro Nannini	27	DNF	DNF
1991	C2	34	G	Jaguar XJR-12; Jaguar 7.4L V12	(United Kingdom) Silk Cut Jaguar (United Kingdom) Tom Walkinshaw Racing	(France) Bob Wollek (United Kingdom) Kenny Acheson	358	**3rd**	**3rd**
1992	C1	8	G	Toyota TS010; Toyota RV10 3.5L V10	(Japan) Toyota Team Tom's	(Netherlands) Jan Lammers (United Kingdom) Andy Wallace	331	8th	5th
1993	C1	1	M	Peugeot 905 Evo 1B; Peugeot SA35 3.5L V10	(France) Peugeot Talbot Sport	(Belgium) Thierry Boutsen (France) Yannick Dalmas	374	**2nd**	**2nd**

=== CART World Series results ===
(key) (Races in bold indicate pole position)

Year	Team	No.	Chassis	Engine	1	2	3	4	5	6	7	8	9	10	11	12	13	14	15	16	17	Rank	Points	Ref
1983	Forsythe Racing	33	March 83C	Cosworth DFX	ATL; 20	**INDY**; 26	**MIL**; 4	CLE; 3	**MCH**; 15	ROA; 15	POC; 1*	**RIV**; 2	MOH; 1*	MCH; 3	CPL; 25	**LAG**; 1*	**PHX**; 1*					2nd	146	
1984	Forsythe Racing	33	March 84C	Cosworth DFX	LBH; 18	PHX; 19	INDY; 24	MIL; 12	POR; 3	MEA; 27	CLE; 13	MCH	ROA	POC	MOH	SAN	MCH	PHX	LAG	CPL		25th	15	
1988	Porsche Motorsports	8	Porsche 2708	Porsche Indy V8	PHX; 7	LBH; 24	INDY; 28	MIL; 9	POR; 7	CLE; 24	TOR; 10	MEA; 18	MCH; 25	POC; 24	MOH; 8	ROA; 8	NAZ; 4	LAG; 10	MIA; 21			10th	44	
1989	Porsche Motorsports	8	March 89P	Porsche Indy V8	PHX; 6	LBH; 27	INDY; 30	MIL; 3	DET; 4	**POR**; 4	CLE; 4	MEA; 9	TOR; 4	MCH; 2	POC; 4	**MOH**; 1*	ROA; 2	NAZ; 16	LAG; 19			4th	141	
1990	Porsche Motorsports	4	March 89P	Porsche Indy V8	PHX; 24	LBH; 10																14th	33	
1990	Porsche Motorsports	4	March 90P	Porsche Indy V8			INDY; 18	MIL; 12	DET; 24	POR; 7	CLE; 13	MEA; 3	TOR; 15	MCH; 24	**DEN**; 27	VAN; 16	MOH; 19	ROA; 25	NAZ; 11	LAG; 7		14th	33	
1992	Newman-Haas Racing	2	Lola T92/00	Ford Cosworth XB	SRF	PHX	LBH	INDY	DET; 6	POR	MIL	NHA	TOR	MCH	CLE	ROA	VAN	MOH	NAZ	LAG		21st	8	
1993	Hall VDS Racing	8	Lola T93/00	Ilmor-Chevrolet Indy V8 265C	SRF; 9	PHX; 5	LBH; 4	INDY; 9	MIL; 9	DET; 22	POR; 25	CLE; 8	TOR; 14	MCH; 6	NHA; 16	ROA; 8	VAN; 8	MOH; 24	NAZ; 11	LAG; 8		11th	64	
1994	Hall Racing	11	Reynard 94i	Ilmor Indy V8	SRF; 7	PHX; 26	LBH; 9	INDY; 7	MIL; 17	DET; 4	POR; 26	CLE; 9	TOR; 8	MCH; 4	MOH; 21	NHA; 20	VAN; 18	ROA; 4	NAZ; 6	LAG; 5		9th	79	
1995	Forsythe Racing	33	Reynard 95i	Ford Cosworth XB	MIA; 16	SRF; 13	PHX; 7	LBH; 3	NAZ; 7	INDY; 8	**MIL**; 4	DET; 7	POR; 23	ROA; 9	TOR; 4	CLE; 19	MCH; 4	MOH; 17	NHA; 12	VAN; 19	LAG; 9	9th	83	
1996	PacWest Racing	21	Reynard 96i	Ford Cosworth XD	MIA	RIO	SRF	LBH; 18	NAZ; 16	500; Wth	MIL	DET	POR	CLE	TOR	MCH	MOH	ROA	VAN	LAG		36th	0	

==== Indianapolis 500 ====
Year	Chassis	Engine	Start	Finish	Team
1983	March 83C	Cosworth DFX	**1**	26	Forsythe Racing
1984	March 84C	Cosworth DFX	14	24	Forsythe Racing
1988	March 88P	Porsche Indy V8	17	28	Porsche Motorsports
1989	March 89P	Porsche Indy V8	13	30	Porsche Motorsports
1990	March 90P	Porsche Indy V8	23	18	Porsche Motorsports
1993	Lola T93/00	Ilmor-Chevrolet Indy V8 265C	17	9	Hall/VDS Racing
1994	Reynard 94i	Ilmor Indy V8	24	7	Hall Racing
1995	Reynard 95i	Ford Cosworth XB	15	8	Forsythe Racing

== Sources ==
- Profile, grandprix.com

Sporting positions
Preceded by Jean-Louis Schlesser; Mauro Baldi	World Sportscar Championship; Champion; 1991	Succeeded by Derek Warwick; Yannick Dalmas
Preceded by Jim Hickman	Indianapolis 500; Rookie of the Year; 1983	Succeeded by Roberto Guerrero; Michael Andretti
Preceded by Bobby Rahal	CART; Rookie of the Year; 1983	Succeeded by Roberto Guerrero
