= 1987 San Marino Grand Prix =

- Race 2 of 16 in the 1987 Formula One World Championship
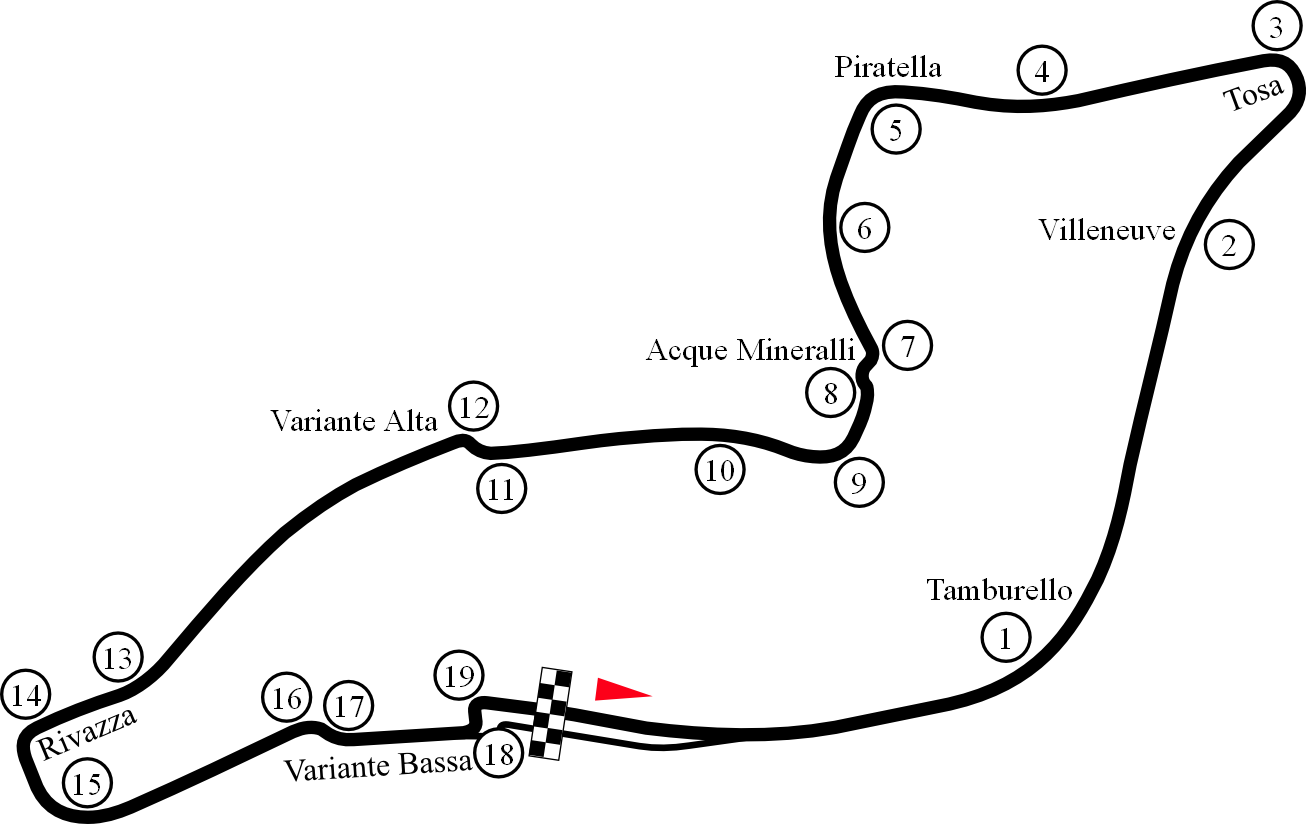

Race details
- Date: 3 May 1987
- Official name: 7° Gran Premio di San Marino
- Location: Autodromo Dino Ferrari, Imola, Emilia-Romagna, Italy
- Course: Permanent racing facility
- Course length: 5.040 km (3.131 miles)
- Distance: 59 laps, 297.360 km (184.770 miles)
- Weather: Sunny, warm

Pole position
Driver	(Brazil) Ayrton Senna	Lotus-Honda
- Time: 1:25.826

Fastest lap
Driver	(Italy) Teo Fabi	Benetton-Ford
- Time: 1:29.246 on lap 51

Podium
First	(United Kingdom) Nigel Mansell	Williams-Honda
Second	(Brazil) Ayrton Senna	Lotus-Honda
Third	(Italy) Michele Alboreto	Ferrari

The 1987 San Marino Grand Prix was a Formula One motor race held on 3 May 1987 at the Autodromo Dino Ferrari, Imola. It was the second race of the 1987 Formula One season. It was the seventh San Marino Grand Prix and it was held over 59 laps of the five kilometre circuit for a race distance of 297 kilometres.

The race was won by British driver Nigel Mansell driving a Williams FW11B. It was Mansell's eighth Grand Prix victory, his first (of two) at the Imola circuit. Mansell finished 27 seconds ahead of Brazilian driver Ayrton Senna driving a Lotus 99T. Third was Italian driver Michele Alboreto driving a Ferrari F1/87. The win gave Mansell a one-point lead in the championship over French McLaren driver Alain Prost.

== Race summary ==
In Friday practice, championship contender Nelson Piquet was eliminated from the race after an accident at the Tamburello corner. A tyre of his Williams FW11B failed, which resulted in a violent impact against the wall (when the car was returned to the pits, Williams designer Patrick Head could not confirm if the crash was a fault with the FW11B as half the rear end had been torn off by the impact, while both Head and Nigel Mansell were seen taking a good look at Piquet's wreck). Whilst in his opinion he had only sustained a sore ankle, he was taken to the nearby Bellaria-Igea Marina hospital, and after medical checks he was forbidden to start by FIA Medical Delegate Sid Watkins. For the remainder of the weekend Piquet worked as a guest commentator on Italian television. Years later he revealed that he was "never quite right" after the accident, suffering headaches and sometimes double vision. For the rest of the 1987 season, he visited the hospital for treatment, but did so in secret for fear that he would not be allowed to race either by Williams or Watkins.

Alarmed by reports from other drivers of excessive tyre blistering and the suggestion that Piquet's accident may have been caused by a tyre deflation, Goodyear withdrew all the tyres issued to teams (the original compounds taken to Imola were actually different to those supplied for a scheduled test at the circuit the week prior to the race). A replacement selection of the tyres used in the Imola test were flown in from England (with some also brought in from the nearby Ferrari factory in Maranello) and despite the lack of Customs officials due to International Workers' holiday, the new rubber was available for all teams by the Saturday morning practice session.

Saturday's qualifying went on smoothly, with Ayrton Senna claiming pole position on his Lotus 99T, the first ever pole position for an active suspension car and also the last pole position for the original Lotus team, with Mansell alongside him in the front row. The second row was occupied by Teo Fabi in the Benetton B187 and Alain Prost's McLaren MP4/3; "home" team Ferrari took the whole third row with Michele Alboreto ahead of Gerhard Berger.

The race required two starts as Martin Brundle (Zakspeed 871), Thierry Boutsen (Benetton B187) and Eddie Cheever (Arrows A10) stalled on the original grid. Satoru Nakajima started from the pit lane owing to a faulty battery in his Lotus, and René Arnoux failed to take the second start after the suspension of his Ligier JS29B failed.

At the second start, Senna led off the line, but Mansell overtook him on lap two, at the Tosa corner, and went on to dominate the race. Prost took second place by overtaking Senna on lap 6; the Brazilian was then engaged in a battle with the two Ferraris, and took back second when Prost surprisingly retired with an alternator failure on lap 15. Berger retired with turbo boost failure on lap 17, and by that time Alboreto passed Senna to take second place.

On lap 22, Mansell pitted early due to a loose wheel balance weight and for three laps Alboreto led the race to the delight of the Tifosi. Senna retook first position with Alboreto's pit stop, then before Mansell returned to the front when the Brazilian stopped. Riccardo Patrese in his Brabham BT56 was now holding second place, but in the closing stages of the race his alternator developed trouble and he slowed right down, eventually finishing two laps down in ninth. The closing stages also saw both Benetton drivers retire, Boutsen on lap 49 with an engine failure and Fabi three laps later with a turbo failure. Fabi's race had been wrecked by front wing damage sustained on the first lap when he collided with Cheever, although his attempted fightback did produce the fastest lap.

Mansell took a comfortable win with Senna holding second after Alboreto's turbo experienced problems. Alboreto salvaged a 3rd place finish, which would end up being the last podium Enzo Ferrari personally saw his Formula One team score, as he only attended Grand Prix races in Italy, and would die 15 months later. Stefan Johansson (McLaren MP4/3) was in fourth place whilst Derek Warwick's late race retirement after his Arrows A10 ran out of fuel, handed fifth to Brundle for what would the only time in 5 seasons (1985-1989) that a Zakspeed would finish a race in the points. Nakajima rounded off the points in sixth place, which meant he was the first Japanese driver to score a world championship point, and the first Asian driver to score since the fourth place of Thai Birabongse Bhanudej in the 1954 French Grand Prix.

== Classification ==
=== Qualifying ===
Pos	No	Driver	Constructor	Q1	Q2	Gap
1	12	(Brazil) Ayrton Senna	Lotus-Honda	1:27.543	1:25.826	—
2	5	(United Kingdom) Nigel Mansell	Williams-Honda	1:26.204	1:25.946	+0.120
3	6	(Brazil) Nelson Piquet	Williams-Honda	1:25.997	—	+0.171
4	1	(France) Alain Prost	McLaren-TAG	1:29.317	1:26.135	+0.309
5	19	(Italy) Teo Fabi	Benetton-Ford	1:27.801	1:27.270	+1.444
6	28	(Austria) Gerhard Berger	Ferrari	1:28.229	1:27.280	+1.454
7	27	(Italy) Michele Alboreto	Ferrari	1:29.653	1:28.074	+2.248
8	7	(Italy) Riccardo Patrese	Brabham-BMW	1:28.447	1:28.421	+2.595
9	2	(Sweden) Stefan Johansson	McLaren-TAG	1:30.416	1:28.708	+2.882
10	18	(United States) Eddie Cheever	Arrows-Megatron	1:30.379	1:28.848	+3.022
11	17	(United Kingdom) Derek Warwick	Arrows-Megatron	1:28.887	1:29.236	+3.061
12	20	(Belgium) Thierry Boutsen	Benetton-Ford	1:28.929	1:28.908	+3.082
13	11	(Japan) Satoru Nakajima	Lotus-Honda	1:29.579	1:30.545	+3.753
14	25	(France) René Arnoux	Ligier-Megatron	1:31.078	1:29.861	+4.035
15	8	(Italy) Andrea de Cesaris	Brabham-BMW	1:30.627	1:30.382	+4.556
16	9	(United Kingdom) Martin Brundle	Zakspeed	1:31.931	1:31.094	+5.268
17	24	(Italy) Alessandro Nannini	Minardi-Motori Moderni	1:31.789	—	+5.963
18	23	(Spain) Adrián Campos	Minardi-Motori Moderni	1:41.520	1:31.818	+5.992
19	10	(West Germany) Christian Danner	Zakspeed	1:32.977	1:31.903	+6.077
20	26	(Italy) Piercarlo Ghinzani	Ligier-Megatron	1:32.873	1:32.248	+6.422
21	21	(Italy) Alex Caffi	Osella-Alfa Romeo	1:32.308	1:33.298	+6.482
22	4	(France) Philippe Streiff	Tyrrell-Ford	1:35.001	1:33.155	+7.329
23	30	(France) Philippe Alliot	Lola-Ford	1:34.458	1:33.846	+8.020
24	16	(Italy) Ivan Capelli	March-Ford	1:37.463	1:33.872	+8.046
25	3	(United Kingdom) Jonathan Palmer	Tyrrell-Ford	1:34.632	1:36.127	+8.806
26	14	(France) Pascal Fabre	AGS-Ford	1:39.747	1:36.159	+10.333
27	22	(Italy) Gabriele Tarquini	Osella-Alfa Romeo	1:43.446	—	+17.620

=== Race ===
Numbers in brackets refer to positions of normally aspirated entrants competing for the Jim Clark Trophy.

Pos	No	Driver	Constructor	Laps	Time/Retired	Grid	Points
1	5	(United Kingdom) Nigel Mansell	Williams-Honda	59	1:31:24.076	2	9
2	12	(Brazil) Ayrton Senna	Lotus-Honda	59	+27.545	1	6
3	27	(Italy) Michele Alboreto	Ferrari	59	+39.144	6	4
4	2	(Sweden) Stefan Johansson	McLaren-TAG	59	+1:00.588	8	3
5	9	(United Kingdom) Martin Brundle	Zakspeed	57	+2 laps	14	2
6	11	(Japan) Satoru Nakajima	Lotus-Honda	57	+2 laps	12	1
7	10	(West Germany) Christian Danner	Zakspeed	57	+2 laps	17	
8 (1)	4	(France) Philippe Streiff	Tyrrell-Ford	57	+2 laps	20	
9	7	(Italy) Riccardo Patrese	Brabham-BMW	57	+2 laps	7	
10 (2)	30	(France) Philippe Alliot	Lola-Ford	56	+3 laps	21	
11	17	(United Kingdom) Derek Warwick	Arrows-Megatron	55	Out of fuel	10	
12	21	(Italy) Alex Caffi	Osella-Alfa Romeo	54	Out of fuel	19	
13 (3)	14	(France) Pascal Fabre	AGS-Ford	53	+6 laps	24	
Ret	19	(Italy) Teo Fabi	Benetton-Ford	51	Turbo	4	
Ret	20	(Belgium) Thierry Boutsen	Benetton-Ford	48	Engine	11	
Ret	18	(United States) Eddie Cheever	Arrows-Megatron	48	Clutch	9	
Ret	3	(United Kingdom) Jonathan Palmer	Tyrrell-Ford	48	Clutch	23	
Ret	8	(Italy) Andrea de Cesaris	Brabham-BMW	39	Spun off	13	
Ret	23	(Spain) Adrián Campos	Minardi-Motori Moderni	30	Gearbox	16	
Ret	22	(Italy) Gabriele Tarquini	Osella-Alfa Romeo	26	Gearbox	25	
Ret	24	(Italy) Alessandro Nannini	Minardi-Motori Moderni	25	Turbo	15	
Ret	16	(Italy) Ivan Capelli	March-Ford	18	Engine	22	
Ret	28	(Austria) Gerhard Berger	Ferrari	16	Electrical	5	
Ret	1	(France) Alain Prost	McLaren-TAG	14	Electrical	3	
Ret	26	(Italy) Piercarlo Ghinzani	Ligier-Megatron	7	Handling	18	
DNS	25	(France) René Arnoux	Ligier-Megatron	0	Suspension		
DNS	6	(Brazil) Nelson Piquet	Williams-Honda		Injury		

== Championship standings after the race ==
Drivers' Championship standings

Pos	Driver	Points
1	(United Kingdom) Nigel Mansell	10
2	(France) Alain Prost	9
3	(Sweden) Stefan Johansson	7
4	(Brazil) Nelson Piquet	6
5	(Brazil) Ayrton Senna	6

Constructors' Championship standings

Pos	Constructor	Points
1	(United Kingdom) Williams-Honda	16
2	(United Kingdom) McLaren-TAG	16
3	(United Kingdom) Lotus-Honda	7
4	(Italy) Ferrari	7
5	(United Kingdom) Benetton-Ford	2

Jim Clark Trophy standings

Pos	Driver	Points
1	(France) Philippe Streiff	15
2	(United Kingdom) Jonathan Palmer	9
3	(France) Pascal Fabre	8
4	(France) Philippe Alliot	6

Colin Chapman Trophy standings

Pos	Constructor	Points
1	(United Kingdom) Tyrrell-Ford	24
2	(France) AGS-Ford	8
3	(France) Lola-Ford	6

- Note: Only the top five positions are included for all four sets of standings.

Previous race: 1987 Brazilian Grand Prix	FIA Formula One World Championship; 1987 season	Next race: 1987 Belgian Grand Prix
Previous race: 1986 San Marino Grand Prix	San Marino Grand Prix	Next race: 1988 San Marino Grand Prix
