= Toleman TG185 =

Formula One racing car

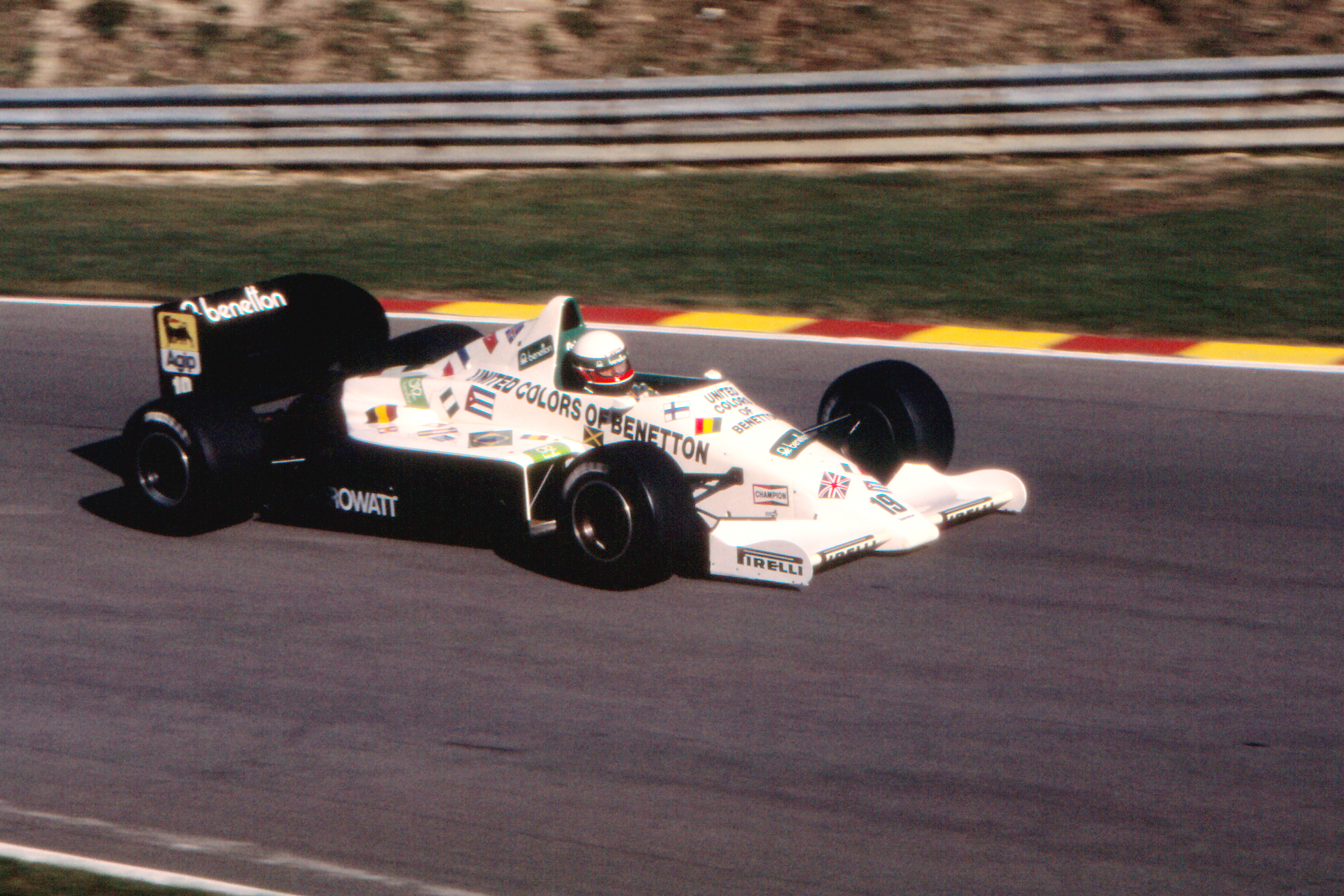
- Teo Fabi driving the TG185
- Category: Formula One
- Constructor: Toleman
- Designers: Rory Byrne (chassis); Brian Hart (engine)
- Predecessor: TG184
- Successor: Benetton B186

Technical specifications
- Chassis: Carbon fibre monocoque
- Suspension (front): double wishbones, pull-rod actuated coil springs over dampers
- Suspension (rear): double wishbones, push-rod actuated coil springs over dampers
- Axle track: Front: 1,816 mm (71 in); Rear: 1,683 mm (66 in)
- Wheelbase: 2,692 mm (106 in)
- Engine: Hart 415T 1,459 cc (89.0 cu in), straight 4 turbo, mid-engine, longitudinally mounted
- Transmission: Hewland / Toleman 5-speed manual
- Weight: 545 kg (1,202 lb)
- Fuel: Agip
- Tyres: Pirelli

Competition history
- Notable entrants: Toleman Group Motorsport
- Notable drivers: 19. (Italy) Teo Fabi; 20. (Italy) Piercarlo Ghinzani
- Debut: 1985 Monaco Grand Prix
- Last event: 1985 Australian Grand Prix
Races	Wins	Poles	F/Laps
13	0	1	0
- Constructors' Championships: 0
- Drivers' Championships: 0

The Toleman TG185 was a Formula One racing car designed by Rory Byrne for use by the Toleman team in the 1985 Formula One World Championship.

== Background ==
After a successful 1984 season, Toleman entered 1985 with Swede Stefan Johansson and John Watson signed as drivers, but without a main sponsor or a tyre contract. The team had switched from Pirelli to Michelin during 1984 following a dispute with the Italian supplier, only for the French company to withdraw from F1 at the end of the year. Pirelli were reluctant to supply the team again, as were Goodyear. Hence, Toleman did not compete in the first three races of 1985, during which Johansson was released from his contract to replace René Arnoux at Ferrari.

Only when Benetton stepped in as main sponsor were the team able to compete, as the Italian clothing company bought the struggling Spirit team's Pirelli tyre contract.

== Design ==
The car was largely similar to the previous year's TG184, apart from a revised suspension to deal with running a different tyre compound and revised rear bodywork. The car was powered by the 800 bhp (597 kW; 811 PS) Hart 415T straight-4 turbocharged engine.

== Racing history ==
The TG185 made its debut at the Monaco Grand Prix.

At first, a single car was entered for Italian Teo Fabi, who had previously driven for the team in 1982. From the Austrian Grand Prix onwards, a second car was entered for another Italian driver, Piercarlo Ghinzani, who joined the team from Osella.

Fabi gave Toleman its first and only pole position at the German Grand Prix, held at the new Nürburgring. This was to be the team's only highlight of 1985, as the TG185 was otherwise unreliable and saw the finish line just twice all year, when Fabi finished 14th in France and 12th in Italy.

== Aftermath ==
The TG185 was the last Toleman car, as the team was bought out by Benetton and renamed Benetton Formula ahead of the 1986 season.

One TG185 remains fully operational as of 2018, having been rebuilt during 2016 by Tour-De-Force Power Engineering. It is often seen in historic F1 demonstrations in the UK and Europe. It retains the original Hart 415T engine and Hewland derived gearbox.

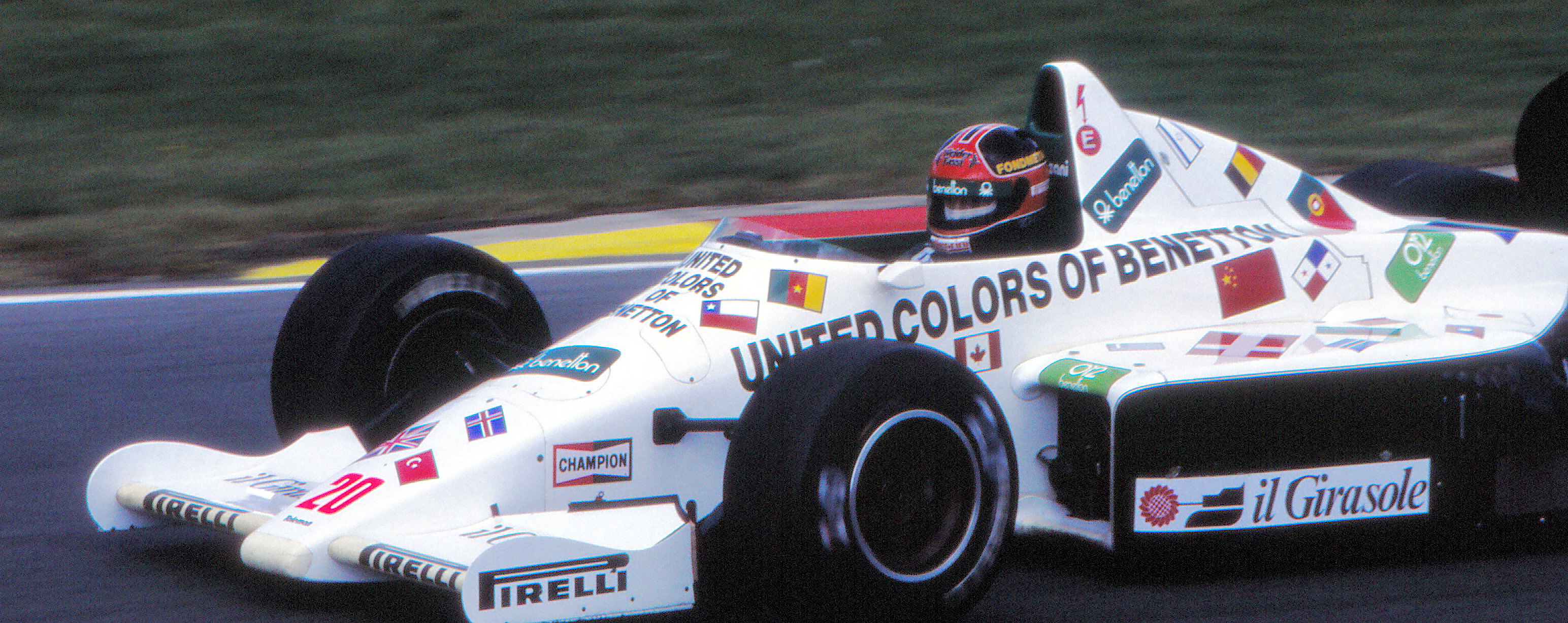
Piercarlo Ghinzani during practice for the 1985 European Grand Prix at Brands Hatch.

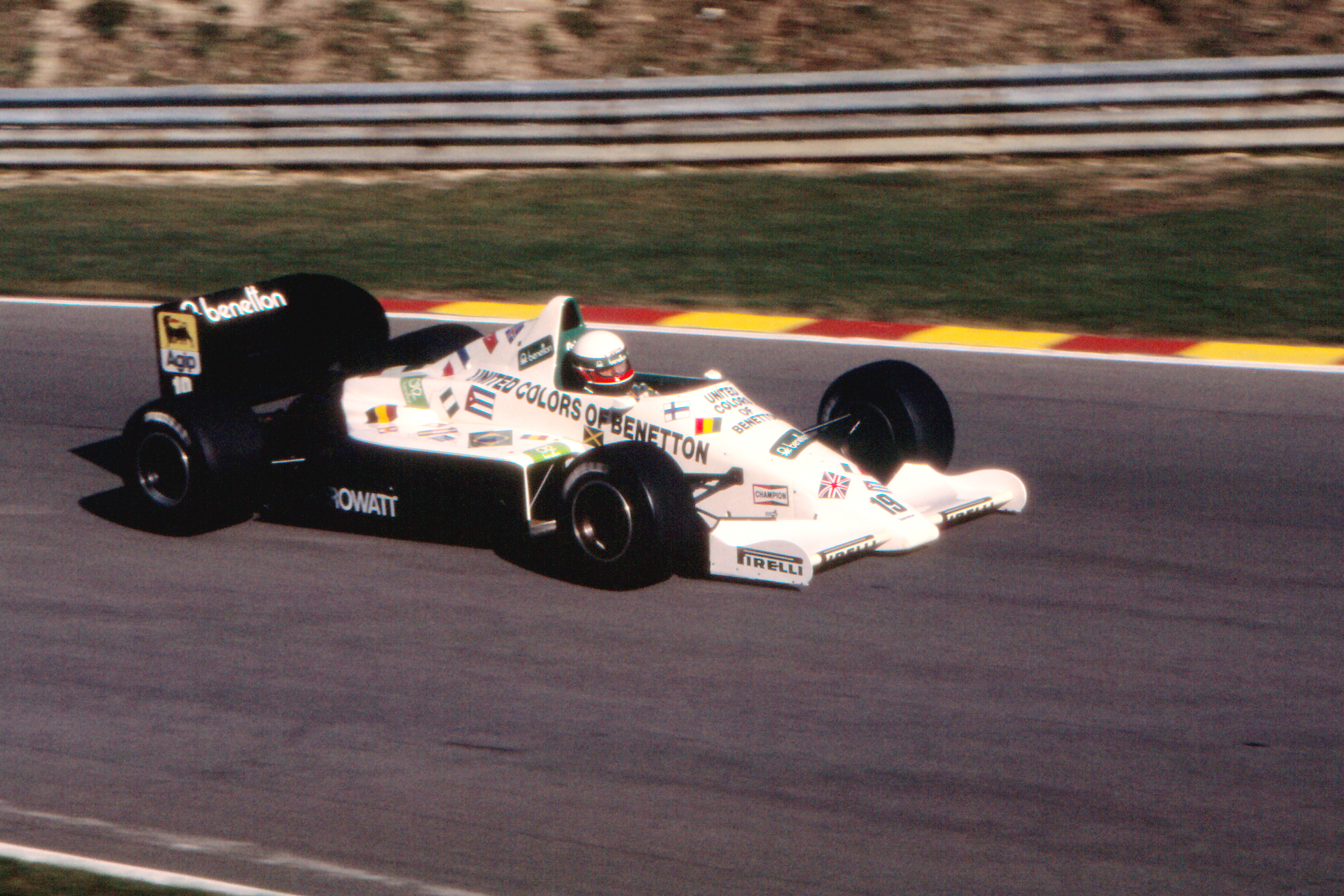
Teo Fabi, also during practice for the 1985 European Grand Prix.

== Complete Formula One results ==
(key) (Results shown in bold indicate pole position)

Year	Team	Engine	Tyres	Driver	1	2	3	4	5	6	7	8	9	10	11	12	13	14	15	16	Pts.	WCC
1985	Toleman Group Motorsport	Hart 415T; S4 t/c	**P**		BRA	POR	SMR	MON	CAN	DET	FRA	GBR	GER	AUT	NED	ITA	BEL	EUR	RSA	AUS	**0**	**NC**
1985	Toleman Group Motorsport	Hart 415T; S4 t/c	**P**	Teo Fabi				Ret	Ret	Ret	14	Ret	**Ret**	Ret	Ret	12	Ret	Ret	Ret	Ret	**0**	**NC**
1985	Toleman Group Motorsport	Hart 415T; S4 t/c	**P**	Piercarlo Ghinzani										DNS	Ret	DNS	Ret	Ret	Ret	Ret	**0**	**NC**
