= 1985 Monaco Grand Prix =

Coordinates: 43°44′4.74″N 7°25′16.8″E

- Race 4 of 16 in the 1985 Formula One World Championship
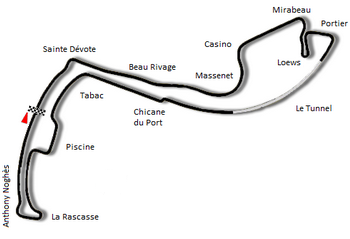

Race details
- Date: 19 May 1985
- Official name: 41e Grand Prix de Monaco
- Location: Circuit de Monaco, Monte Carlo, Monaco
- Course: Street circuit
- Course length: 3.312 km (2.057 miles)
- Distance: 78 laps, 258.336 km (160.446 miles)
- Weather: Dry

Pole position
Driver	(Brazil) Ayrton Senna	Lotus-Renault
- Time: 1:20.450

Fastest lap
Driver	(Italy) Michele Alboreto	Ferrari
- Time: 1:22.637 on lap 60 (lap record)

Podium
First	(France) Alain Prost	McLaren-TAG
Second	(Italy) Michele Alboreto	Ferrari
Third	(Italy) Elio de Angelis	Lotus-Renault

The 1985 Monaco Grand Prix was a Formula One motor race held at Monaco on 19 May 1985. It was the fourth race of the 1985 Formula One World Championship.

The 78-lap race was won by Alain Prost, driving a McLaren-TAG. Ayrton Senna took pole position in his Lotus-Renault and led until he suffered an engine failure on lap 14. Michele Alboreto finished second in a Ferrari, with Elio de Angelis third in the other Lotus-Renault.

After the race, de Angelis led the Drivers' Championship by two points from Prost and Alboreto.

== Summary ==
As usual for the time, the FIA allowed only 20 cars to start the race, due to the tight confines of the Monaco circuit. The Toleman team entered their first race of the season, having missed the opening three rounds due to not having tyres. Having bought out the tyre contract of the struggling Spirit team, Toleman were able to race for the rest of the season. This was the first race in which they were sponsored by the Benetton clothing company, who would buy the team and rename it Benetton Formula from 1986 onwards. Former Brabham driver Teo Fabi got the new Toleman-Hart onto the grid in 20th and last place just 0.106 seconds ahead of the Osella-Alfa Romeo of Piercarlo Ghinzani.

There was a big accident on the pit straight involving Nelson Piquet and Riccardo Patrese, this accident was to affect the outcome of the race. The accident happened right after Piquet and Patrese crossed the start/finish line, Piquet attempted to pass Patrese, the two cars touched and Patrese crashed violently and collected Piquet, whose Brabham's rear suspension broke during the collision before Patrese collected Piquet. The cars then spun into the run-off at the first corner at Sainte Devote; both drivers were unhurt. Patrese's gearbox dropped oil onto the track which took out Niki Lauda who while sliding off on the oil managed to avoid hitting anything, he stalled his engine and was out on the spot. The crash also nearly took out the closely following Jacques Laffite and Teo Fabi, while race leader Michele Alboreto also slid wide on the oil; Alboreto's off handed the lead to Alain Prost. Alboreto drove a hard race; he eventually caught and passed Prost 3 laps later, but was re-passed by Prost after he punctured his left rear tyre at the first corner where Piquet and Patrese crashed. This dropped him to 4th behind Andrea de Cesaris, Elio de Angelis and Prost; he caught and passed his compatriots but could not catch Prost; who despite a leaking turbo wastegate, had kept the gap wide enough for Alboreto to be unable to catch him in the remaining laps.

== Classification ==
=== Qualifying ===
Pos	No	Driver	Constructor	Q1	Q2	Gap
1	12	(Brazil) Ayrton Senna	Lotus-Renault	1:21.631	1:20.450	
2	5	(United Kingdom) Nigel Mansell	Williams-Honda	1:22.560	1:20.536	+0.086
3	27	(Italy) Michele Alboreto	Ferrari	1:22.630	1:20.563	+0.113
4	23	(United States) Eddie Cheever	Alfa Romeo	1:22.755	1:20.729	+0.279
5	2	(France) Alain Prost	McLaren-TAG	1:22.270	1:20.885	+0.435
6	18	(Belgium) Thierry Boutsen	Arrows-BMW	1:24.510	1:21.302	+0.852
7	6	(Finland) Keke Rosberg	Williams-Honda	1:23.099	1:21.320	+0.870
8	25	(Italy) Andrea de Cesaris	Ligier-Renault	1:22.992	1:21.347	+0.897
9	11	(Italy) Elio de Angelis	Lotus-Renault	1:23.319	1:21.465	+1.015
10	16	(United Kingdom) Derek Warwick	Renault	1:23.524	1:21.531	+1.081
11	17	(Austria) Gerhard Berger	Arrows-BMW	1:24.293	1:21.665	+1.215
12	22	(Italy) Riccardo Patrese	Alfa Romeo	1:22.145	1:21.813	+1.363
13	7	(Brazil) Nelson Piquet	Brabham-BMW	1:23.548	1:21.817	+1.367
14	1	(Austria) Niki Lauda	McLaren-TAG	1:22.897	1:21.907	+1.457
15	28	(Sweden) Stefan Johansson	Ferrari	1:23.163	1:22.635	+2.185
16	26	(France) Jacques Laffite	Ligier-Renault	1:26.681	1:22.888	+2.438
17	15	(France) Patrick Tambay	Renault	1:24.473	1:22.912	+2.462
18	3	(United Kingdom) Martin Brundle	Tyrrell-Ford	1:26.499	1:23.827	+3.377
19	30	(United Kingdom) Jonathan Palmer	Zakspeed	1:41.564	1:23.840	+3.390
20	19	(Italy) Teo Fabi	Toleman-Hart	1:26.243	1:23.965	+3.515
DNQ	24	(Italy) Piercarlo Ghinzani	Osella-Alfa Romeo	1:26.230	1:24.071	+3.621
DNQ	4	(West Germany) Stefan Bellof	Tyrrell-Ford	1:26.214	1:24.236	+3.786
DNQ	10	(France) Philippe Alliot	RAM-Hart	1:28.026	1:24.763	+4.313
DNQ	9	(West Germany) Manfred Winkelhock	RAM-Hart	1:26.102	1:24.764	+4.314
DNQ	8	(France) François Hesnault	Brabham-BMW	1:27.505	1:25.068	+4.618
DNQ	29	(Italy) Pierluigi Martini	Minardi-Motori Moderni	6:41.307	no time	+5:20.857

=== Race ===
Pos	No	Driver	Constructor	Laps	Time/Retired	Grid	Points
1	2	(France) Alain Prost	McLaren-TAG	78	1:51:58.034	5	9
2	27	(Italy) Michele Alboreto	Ferrari	78	+ 7.541	3	6
3	11	(Italy) Elio de Angelis	Lotus-Renault	78	+ 1:27.171	9	4
4	25	(Italy) Andrea de Cesaris	Ligier-Renault	77	+ 1 Lap	8	3
5	16	(United Kingdom) Derek Warwick	Renault	77	+ 1 Lap	10	2
6	26	(France) Jacques Laffite	Ligier-Renault	77	+ 1 Lap	16	1
7	5	(United Kingdom) Nigel Mansell	Williams-Honda	77	+ 1 Lap	2	
8	6	(Finland) Keke Rosberg	Williams-Honda	76	+ 2 Laps	7	
9	18	(Belgium) Thierry Boutsen	Arrows-BMW	76	+ 2 Laps	6	
10	3	(United Kingdom) Martin Brundle	Tyrrell-Ford	74	+ 4 Laps	18	
11	30	(United Kingdom) Jonathan Palmer	Zakspeed	74	+ 4 Laps	19	
Ret	1	(Austria) Niki Lauda	McLaren-TAG	17	Spun off	14	
Ret	22	(Italy) Riccardo Patrese	Alfa Romeo	16	Collision	12	
Ret	7	(Brazil) Nelson Piquet	Brabham-BMW	16	Collision	13	
Ret	19	(Italy) Teo Fabi	Toleman-Hart	16	Turbo	20	
Ret	12	(Brazil) Ayrton Senna	Lotus-Renault	13	Engine	1	
Ret	23	(United States) Eddie Cheever	Alfa Romeo	10	Alternator	4	
Ret	28	(Sweden) Stefan Johansson	Ferrari	1	Accident	15	
Ret	17	(Austria) Gerhard Berger	Arrows-BMW	0	Accident	11	
Ret	15	(France) Patrick Tambay	Renault	0	Accident	17	

== Championship standings after the race ==
Drivers' Championship standings

Pos	Driver	Points
1	(Italy) Elio de Angelis	20
2	(France) Alain Prost	18
3	(Italy) Michele Alboreto	18
4	(France) Patrick Tambay	10
5	(Brazil) Ayrton Senna	9

Constructors' Championship standings

Pos	Constructor	Points
1	(United Kingdom) Lotus-Renault	29
2	(Italy) Ferrari	22
3	(United Kingdom) McLaren-TAG	21
4	(France) Renault	12
5	(United Kingdom) Arrows-BMW	6

- Note: Only the top five positions are included for both sets of standings.

Previous race: 1985 San Marino Grand Prix	FIA Formula One World Championship; 1985 season	Next race: 1985 Canadian Grand Prix
Previous race: 1984 Monaco Grand Prix	Monaco Grand Prix	Next race: 1986 Monaco Grand Prix
