= Benetton B188 =

Formula One racing car

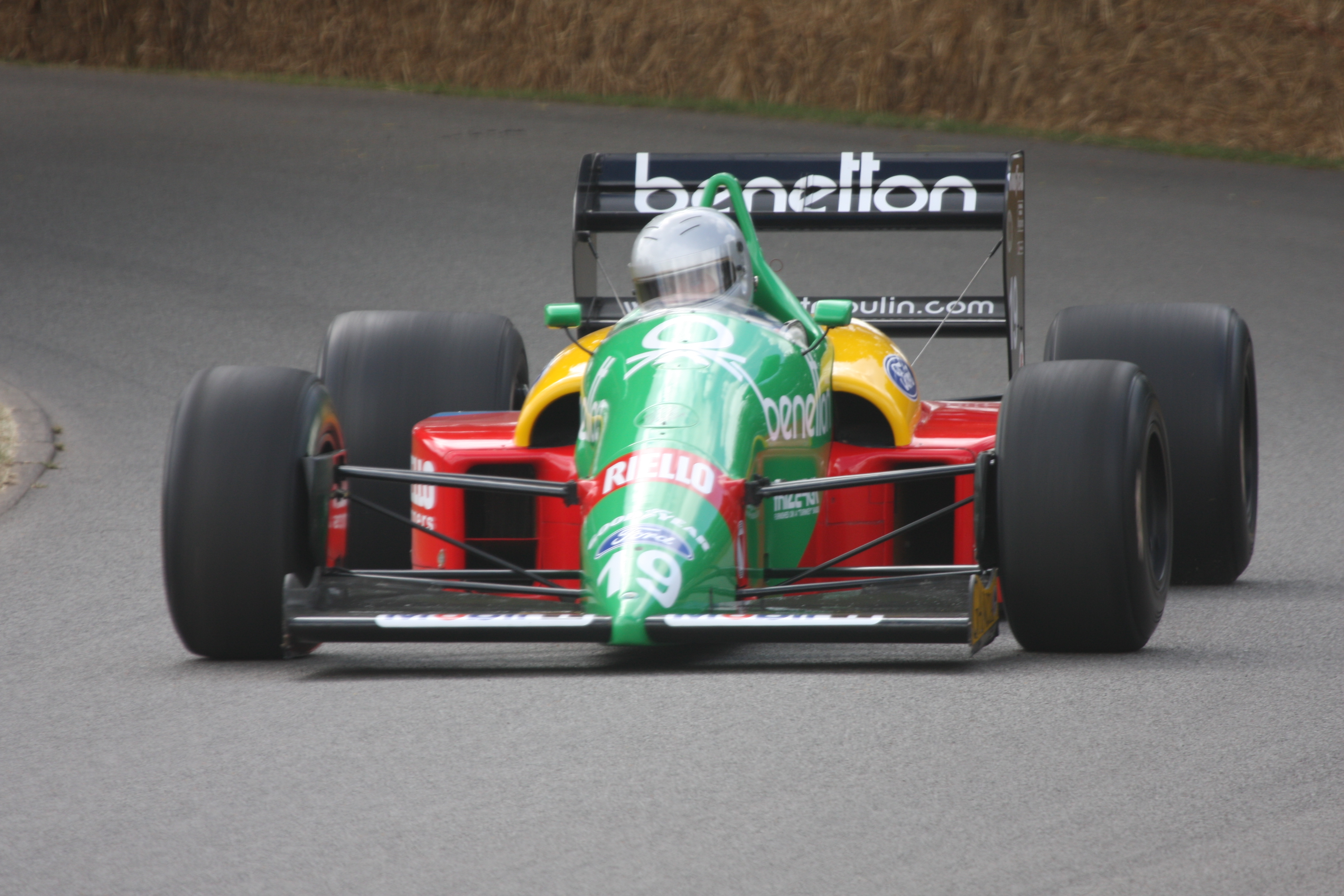
- The B188 at the 2009 Goodwood Festival of Speed
- Category: Formula One
- Constructor: Benetton
- Designers: Rory Byrne (Chief Designer); Geoff Goddard (Chief Engine Designer (Ford-Cosworth))
- Predecessor: B187
- Successor: B189

Technical specifications
- Chassis: Carbon fibre monocoque
- Suspension (front): Double wishbone, pull-rod
- Suspension (rear): Double wishbone, pushrod
- Axle track: Front: 1,816 mm (71.5 in); Rear: 1,682 mm (66.2 in)
- Wheelbase: 2,690 mm (105.9 in)
- Engine: Ford DFR, 3,493 cc (213.2 cu in), 90° V8, NA, mid-engine, longitudinally-mounted
- Transmission: Benetton 6-speed manual
- Power: 585-620 hp @ 11,000 rpm
- Weight: 500 kg (1,100 lb)
- Fuel: Mobil
- Tyres: Goodyear

Competition history
- Notable entrants: Benetton Formula Ltd
- Notable drivers: 19. (Italy) Alessandro Nannini; 20. (Belgium) Thierry Boutsen; 20. (United Kingdom) Johnny Herbert; 20. (Italy) Emanuele Pirro
- Debut: 1988 Brazilian Grand Prix
- Last event: 1989 British Grand Prix
Races	Wins	Podiums	Poles	F/Laps
24	0	8	0	1
- Constructors' Championships: 0
- Drivers' Championships: 0

The Benetton B188 is a Formula One racing car designed by Rory Byrne and raced by Benetton team in the 1988 Formula One season and in the first half of the 1989 Formula One season. Dating back to when the team started as Toleman in 1981, the B188 was the first car produced by the team not to be powered by a turbocharged engine.

== 1988 ==
=== Background and design ===
Benetton was effectively the Ford works team, as they had exclusive use of the 3.5L Ford DFR V8 engine for 1988 whereas others running Ford-Cosworth power had to make do with 1987's DFZ engine. When the FIA announced that turbos would be banned after 1988, Ford made the decision to halt development of the V6 Ford TEC turbocharged engine used in the B188's predecessor the B187, and instead concentrated on the development of an engine for the new 3.5L rules. As Benetton were under contract to run the Ford engine (a contract they did not wish to break), the team's designers were forced to design a car to take the naturally aspirated V8 rather than the turbocharged V6. Despite this, the B188 was visually similar to the B187 it replaced, though it featured a bulkier engine cover to house both the larger engine and a larger fuel tank, as well as featuring larger twin air intakes (located above each sidepod, rather than above the driver's head as would become the norm). The B188 also featured a longer, sleeker looking nose section to take advantage of the rule that would come in from 1989 that meant the driver's feet had to be behind the front axle line, and because FISA had mandated that any new chassis for 1988, which the B188 was, must actually conform to the 1989 rule (carry over cars, such as the updated from 1987 Ferrari F1/87/88C, could still have the driver's feet in front of the front axle line for 1988).

The DFR, a development of the Cosworth DFV that had been introduced to F1 by Lotus in 1967, developed approximately 620 bhp (462 kW; 629 PS), the most powerful 'atmo' engine of the season. This compared to the 650 bhp (485 kW; 659 PS) of the turbocharged Honda and Ferrari engines and only 590 bhp (440 kW; 598 PS) for the older DFZ V8. However, where as the turbo powered cars were restricted to a fuel tank size of 150 litres, the atmospheric cars' fuel tank size was allowed to be much larger. The B188 reportedly had the largest fuel tank on the grid at 215 litres.

=== Competition history ===
The B188 was driven by the team's 1987 driver, Belgian Thierry Boutsen, and the hard-charging, chain-smoking Italian Alessandro Nannini, who had joined Benetton for his 3rd F1 season after two years driving the uncompetitive Minardis with their overweight and underpowered Motori Moderni turbo engines. The B188 was a consistent performer and was usually the class of the atmospheric cars, a class which also included the F1 Constructors' Champions of the previous two years Williams, and the up-and-coming March team (whose car was designed by a young Adrian Newey), both of whom were using the new 600 bhp (447 kW; 608 PS) Judd CV V8 engine.

Boutsen would score 27 points, including 5 podium finishes, to claim 4th in the Drivers' Championship with five 3rd-place finishes, while Nannini scored 12 points, including his first ever podium with 3rd at the British Grand Prix (despite two spins on the very wet Silverstone Circuit) and a second 3rd place later in the season in Spain. Overall with the B188, Benetton finished 3rd in the Constructors' Championship with 39 points, 16 points in front of 4th placed Lotus, who not only used the same Honda engines as the dominant McLarens, but also had reigning World Champion Nelson Piquet as lead driver. Benetton would have in fact finished the season with 46 points but both cars were disqualified from the Belgian Grand Prix for using irregular fuel. The disqualification of the Benettons was not made official until a month after the season had finished, so many published records list Boutsen and Nannini as having finished third and fourth respectively at Spa.

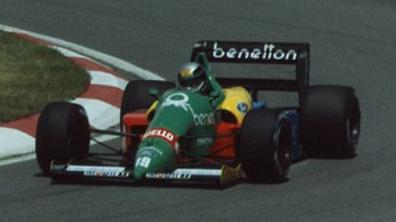
Alessandro Nannini driving the Benetton B188 at the 1988 Canadian Grand Prix.

== 1989 ==
=== Background and design ===
For 1989 Boutsen left to join Williams and was replaced by British rookie Johnny Herbert while the highly rated Nannini assumed the role of lead driver. The B188 was to be replaced by the B189 early in the season which would also see the team having exclusive use of the new development Ford HB4 V8 engine. Unfortunately due to delays with the new engine, and Nannini crashing the team's only constructed B189 in testing prior to the San Marino Grand Prix, the team was forced to use the B188 with the older, now ubiquitous DFR engine (though as the 'factory' team, Benetton got their engines exclusively from, and tuned by, Cosworth) until the new car and engine combination were ready to race in Round 7 in France as the rear suspension and ancillaries of the new car were designed around the newer 75° V8 and the older 90° DFR simply wouldn't fit without the car needing a major re-design to its rear end.

=== Competition history ===
Despite the B188 being seen by the team as obsolete due to being the previous year's model; and with other teams now running customer DFRs, Nannini and Herbert scored 13 points in the first six races of the season with the best being Nannini's 3rd at San Marino. Herbert, who was also recovering from a horrific Formula 3000 crash at Brands Hatch in 1988, scored points on debut in Brazil, finishing 4th (only 1.123 seconds behind 3rd placed Maurício Gugelmin's March-Judd and only 10.493 behind the Ferrari of race winner Nigel Mansell), and two places and 8 seconds ahead of Nannini. Despite a 5th-place finish in the desert heat in Phoenix where the race ran its full two hours, it became obvious in the opening rounds that he needed more time to recover from injuries that included both legs being badly broken (he was actually still laid up in hospital when the team announced him as their new 1989 driver at the 1988 Spanish Grand Prix). Herbert was replaced after the Canadian Grand Prix by McLaren test driver Emanuele Pirro. Pirro was chosen as even though he was an F1 rookie, he had experience driving F1 cars with McLaren, and as an Italian he satisfied the team owners' desire for an Italian driver. Despite driving for Benetton from the French Grand Prix until the end of the season, Pirro was mostly based in Japan where he continued working with Honda as McLaren's test driver at the Suzuka Circuit.

Nannini debuted the B189 at the 1989 French Grand Prix while the last race for the B188 was by Pirro at the British Grand Prix. He qualified 26th and last and finished 11th.

The Ford V8 powered Benetton B188 competed in 24 races, scoring 52 points and 8 podium finishes. Nannini also scored the car's only fastest lap at the 1988 German Grand Prix at a wet Hockenheimring.

== Complete Formula One results ==
(key) (Results in italics indicate fastest lap)

Year	Entrant	Engine	Tyres	Driver	1	2	3	4	5	6	7	8	9	10	11	12	13	14	15	16	Pts.	WCC
1988	Benetton Formula Ltd	Ford DFR; V8 NA	G		BRA	SMR	MON	MEX	CAN	DET	FRA	GBR	GER	HUN	BEL	ITA	POR	ESP	JPN	AUS	39	3rd
1988	Benetton Formula Ltd	Ford DFR; V8 NA	G	Alessandro Nannini	Ret	6	Ret	7	Ret	Ret	6	3	18	Ret	DSQ	9	Ret	3	5	Ret	39	3rd
1988	Benetton Formula Ltd	Ford DFR; V8 NA	G	Thierry Boutsen	7	4	8	8	3	3	Ret	Ret	6	3	DSQ	6	3	9	3	5	39	3rd
1989	Benetton Formula Ltd	Ford DFR; V8	G		BRA	SMR	MON	MEX	USA	CAN	FRA	GBR	GER	HUN	BEL	ITA	POR	ESP	JPN	AUS	39*	4th
1989	Benetton Formula Ltd	Ford DFR; V8	G	Alessandro Nannini	6	3	8	4	Ret	DSQ											39*	4th
1989	Benetton Formula Ltd	Ford DFR; V8	G	Johnny Herbert	4	11	14	15	5	DNQ											39*	4th
1989	Benetton Formula Ltd	Ford DFR; V8	G	Emanuele Pirro							9	11									39*	4th

* 26 points scored in 1989 using Benetton B189
