= Hart 415T engine =

Hart 415T
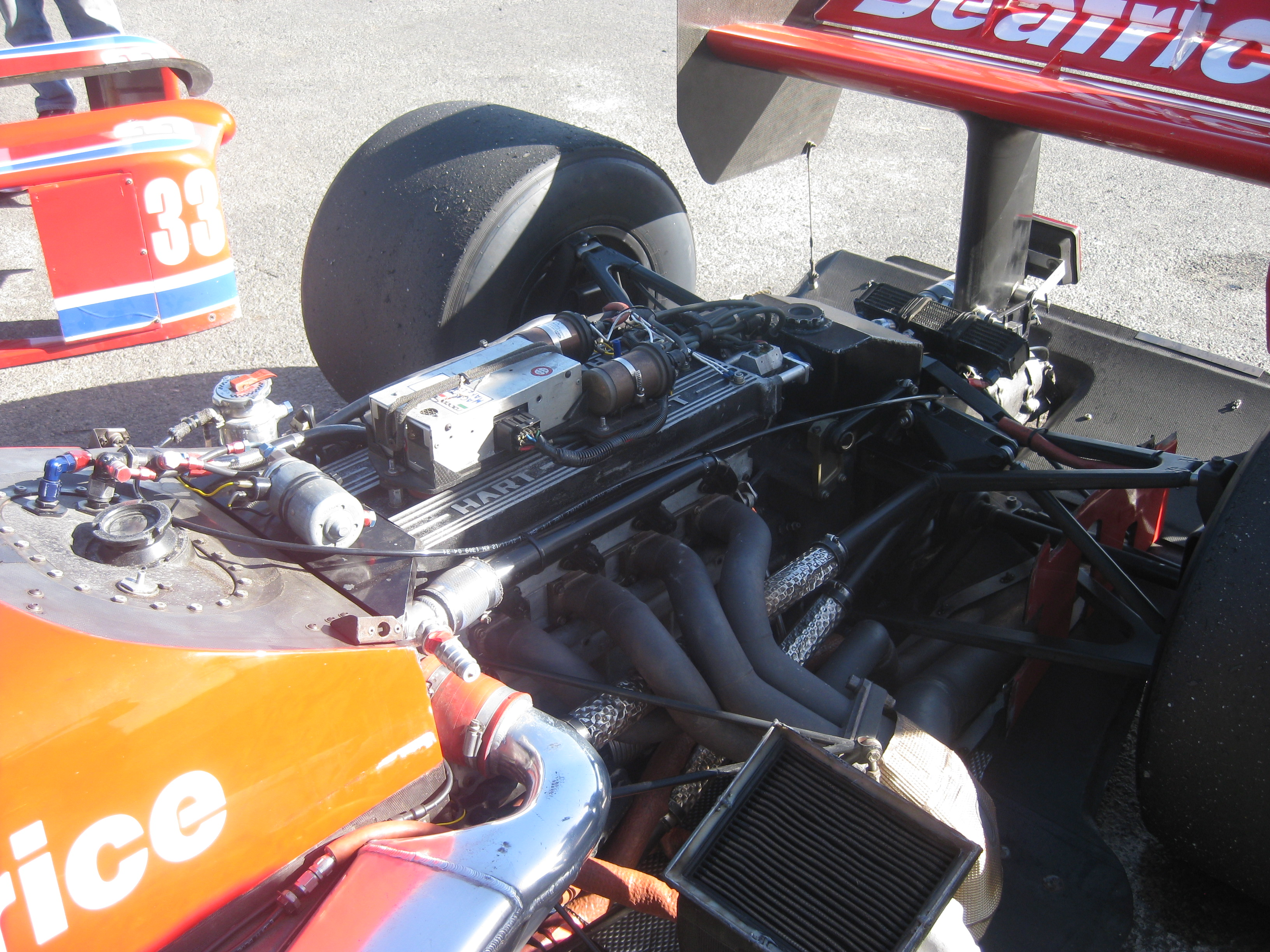
- Hart 415T in a Lola THL1

Overview
- Manufacturer: (United Kingdom) Hart
- Production: 1981–1985

Layout
- Configuration: L4
- Displacement: 1.5 L (1,496 cc)
- Cylinder bore: 88 mm (3.5 in)
- Piston stroke: 61.55 mm (2.4 in)
- Valvetrain: 16-valve, DOHC, four-valves per cylinder
- Compression ratio: 6.7:1

Combustion
- Turbocharger: KKK (later Holset)
- Fuel system: Direct fuel injection
- Fuel type: Gasoline
- Cooling system: Water-cooled

Output
- Power output: 540–750 hp (403–559 kW; 547–760 PS)
- Torque output: 380–480 lb⋅ft (515–651 N⋅m)

Dimensions
- Dry weight: 140 kg (310 lb)

The Hart 415T is a four-stroke, 1.5-litre, turbocharged, inline four-cylinder racing Internal combustion engine, designed, developed and tuned by Brian Hart of Hart Racing Engines, for use in Formula One racing and competition, between 1981 and 1986.

== History ==
The Hart 415T turbo initially developed about 540 hp (400 kW) in 1981, but power levels later surged, eventually going on to produce about 750 hp (560 kW) in qualifying trim and on maximum boost pressure, in 1985. The engines were used by Toleman, RAM, Spirit, and Haas Lola.

1980 World Drivers' Champion Alan Jones once described the Hart turbo as a "Formula 2 engine that someone put a turbo on and said lets go do Formula One". For all intents and purposes, the Hart turbo punched above its weight in F1 with Brian Hart having a limited budget compared to the resources of BMW, Ferrari, Honda, Porsche who built the TAG turbo engine, Alfa Romeo, or Ford and their British engineering partner Cosworth.

=== Podiums ===
The engine achieved three F1 podiums, all for then rookie driver Ayrton Senna of Brazil in 1984. He finished 2nd at the rain shortened Monaco Grand Prix], and followed up with third place finishes in the British Grand Prix at Brands Hatch and the final race of the 1984 season, the Portuguese Grand Prix at Estoril where he had qualified in 3rd place only 0.233 seconds off the pole set by his countryman Nelson Piquet in his Brabham and its BMW 4 cylinder turbo engine which was far more powerful (up to 900 hp (670 kW) by the end of 1984 compared to the 600 hp (450 kW) Hart). To that time it was Senna's, Toleman's and the Hart 415T engine's highest ever qualifying position.

=== Only pole position ===
The only pole position for the 415T was taken in by Toleman's Teo Fabi at the 1985 German Grand Prix at the Nürburgring. Fabi had driven his Toleman TG185 to be a surprise fastest on the first day of qualifying, though he wasn't expected to stay there after final qualifying. However, the Saturday saw qualifying held in wet conditions and as such Friday's times stood for the grid with Fabi's Hart powered Toleman on pole position.

While the Hart engine had taken a great leap forward in outright power between 1984 and 1985, now being rated at approximately 750 hp (560 kW) for qualifying, by 1985 this still lacked compared to the 4 cylinder BMW (1,100 hp (820 kW)) and the V6 engines of, Renault (1,150 hp (860 kW)), Ferrari and Honda (both rated at 1,000 hp (750 kW)) and the 1984 and 1985 Drivers' and Constructors' Championship winning TAG-Porsche (900 hp (670 kW)).

=== Last F1 race ===
The last F1 entry for the Hart engine was at the 1986 San Marino Grand Prix where Patrick Tambay qualified his Lola in a credible 11th place at the Imola Circuit. However he would retire from the race after just 5 laps with a blown engine. The Haas Lola team had debuted the new Cosworth designed and developed Ford V6 turbo in their other car for Alan Jones in San Marino and from the next race in Monaco, Tambay would also drive the Ford powered car and the Hart 415T was quietly retired.

== Horsepower ==
The horsepower figures for the Hart 415T turbo engine were quoted as follows:

- 1981: 540 bhp (403 kW; 547 PS)
- 1982 / 1983: 580 bhp (433 kW; 588 PS)
- 1984: 600 bhp (447 kW; 608 PS)
- 1985 / 1986: 750 bhp (559 kW; 760 PS)

By 1986, the BMW 4 cylinder turbo powering the Benetton team (née Toleman) was quoted as producing as much as 1,400 bhp (1,044 kW; 1,419 PS), almost twice as much as the under-funded Hart unit.

== Applications ==
- Toleman TG181 (1981 / 1982)
- Toleman TG183 (1982 / 1983 / 1984)
- Toleman TG184 (1984)
- Toleman TG185 (1985)
- Spirit 101 (1984 / 1985)
- RAM 01 (1983 / 1984)
- RAM 02 (1984)
- Lola THL1 (1985 / 1986)
