= Lola THL1 =

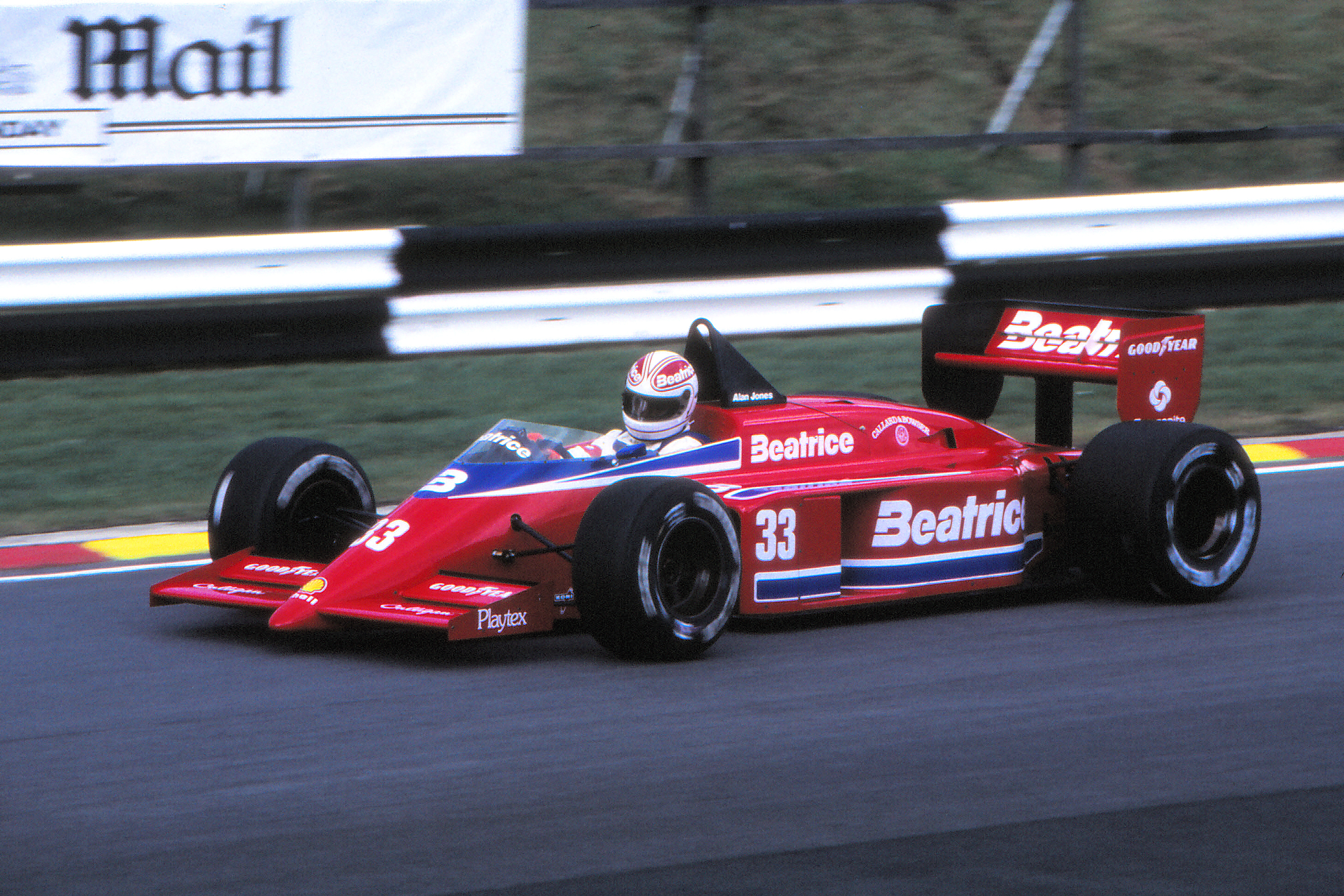
- Alan Jones driving the THL1 at the 1985 European Grand Prix
- Category: Formula One
- Constructor: Team Haas (USA) Ltd.
- Designers: Neil Oatley (Technical Director); John Baldwin (Chief Designer); Ross Brawn (Chief Aerodynamicist); Eric Broadley (Senior Engineer (Honorary)); Brian Hart (Engine Designer)
- Successor: THL2

Technical specifications
- Chassis: Carbon fibre with aluminium honeycomb monocoque
- Suspension (front): Double wishbones, push-rod and rocker actuated coil springs over dampers, anti-roll bar
- Suspension (rear): Double wishbones, push-rod and rocker actuated coil springs over dampers, anti-roll bar
- Axle track: Front: 1,778 mm (70.0 in); Rear: 1,662 mm (65.4 in)
- Wheelbase: 2,720 mm (107 in)
- Engine: Hart 415T, 1,459 cc (89.0 cu in), Straight 4, turbo, mid-engine, longitudinally mounted
- Transmission: Hewland / FORCE 6-speed manual
- Weight: 557 kg (1,228 lb)
- Fuel: Shell / BP
- Tyres: Goodyear

Competition history
- Notable entrants: Team Haas (USA) Ltd.
- Notable drivers: 33./15. (Australia) Alan Jones; 16. (France) Patrick Tambay
- Debut: 1985 Italian Grand Prix
Races	Wins	Poles	F/Laps
7	0	0	0
- Constructors' Championships: 0
- Drivers' Championships: 0

The Lola THL1 was a Formula One racing car designed by Neil Oatley for Team Haas (USA) Ltd. during four of the last five races of the 1985 Formula One season. The Haas Lola team only had one car for 1985 and it was driven by 1980 World Champion, Australia's Alan Jones who after having retired at the end of 1981, plus his aborted comeback in early 1983, was making a full-time comeback to Formula One at the age of 39.

The THL1 used the 750 bhp (559 kW; 760 PS), turbocharged Hart 415T Straight 4 engine. The car was supposed to have the brand new, 900 bhp (671 kW; 912 PS) Ford TEC V6 turbo designed by Keith Duckworth and John Baldwin. However, Cosworth lost some 4 months design and development time unsuccessfully trying to turbocharge an old 4-cylinder engine, thus delivery of the new V6 turbo was delayed until 1986 forcing the team into using Brian Hart's underpowered engines in the interim. This also caused a re-design of the cars rear end to accommodate the Straight 4 engine rather than the 120° V6.

== 1985 ==
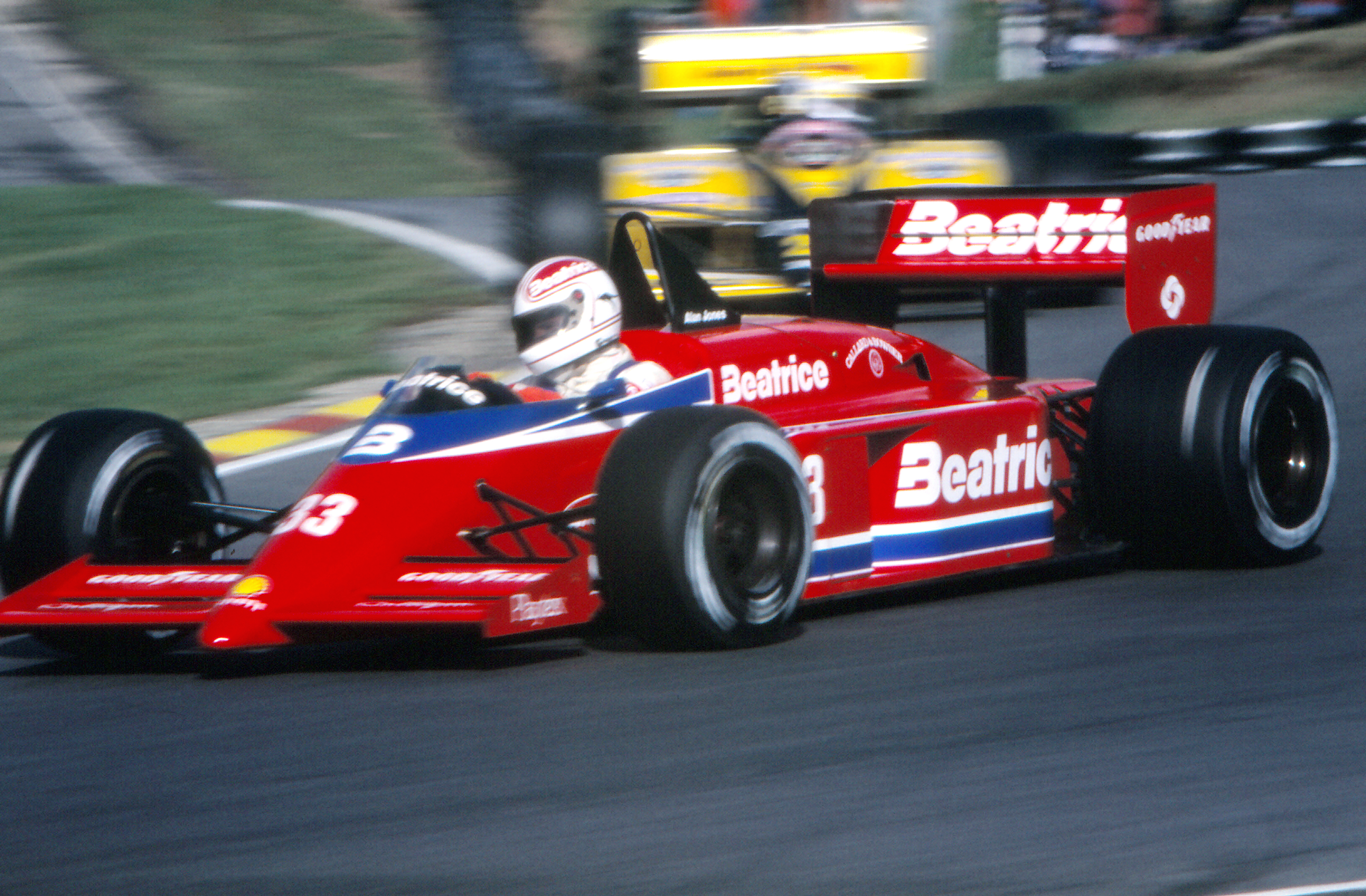
Alan Jones during practice for the 1985 European Grand Prix

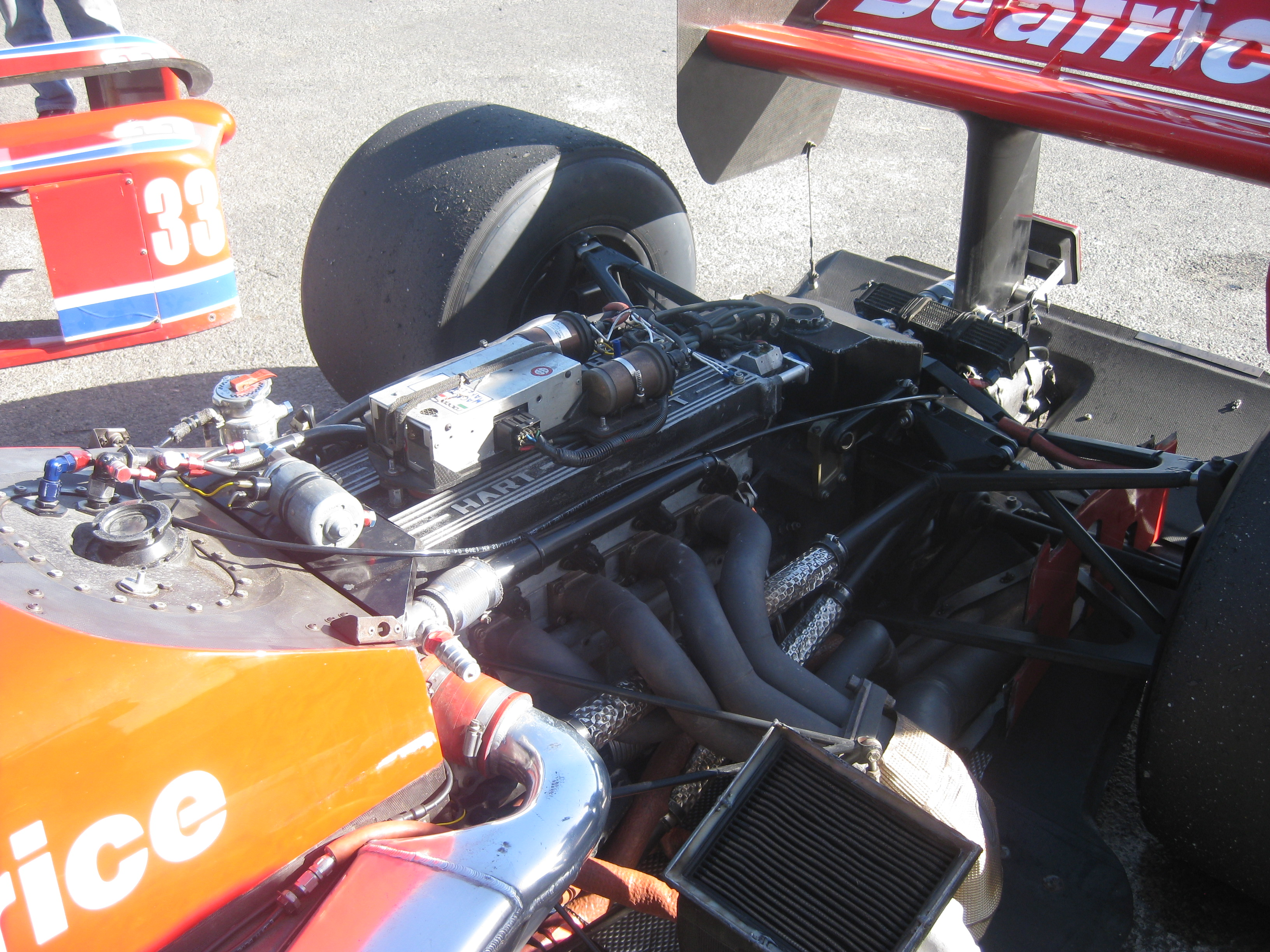
The turbocharged Hart 415T Straight 4 engine in Alan Jones' Lola THL1

The THL1 made its debut at the Italian Grand Prix at Monza, with Jones qualifying 25th, 9.859 seconds behind pole sitter Ayrton Senna (Lotus-Renault), but retiring after just 6 laps due to an overheating engine. The next race, the Belgian Grand Prix, had been rescheduled from 2 June so the team were not allowed to compete because they were not on the original entry list. Jones then qualified 18th for the South African Grand Prix which saw the French Renault and Ligier teams boycott the race for political reasons, and the RAM and Zakspeed teams not enter, but withdrew before the race due to political pressure, however it was covered up as "illness" in order to not lose face, with the plan concocted by Bernie Ecclestone.

Jones showed the potential of the car in the final race of the season, the first ever Australian Formula One Grand Prix (the 1985 AGP was in fact the 50th running of the race, but it was the first time it was part of the FIA World Championship). The Australian qualified 19th for his home race but stalled the car at the start leaving him dead last. After getting a push start and being almost a quarter of a lap behind, Jones fought his way through the field and was up to 6th and into the points by lap 20 before being forced to retire with electrical trouble.

== 1986 ==
The car was to be replaced for the start of the 1986 season but the new Lola THL2 was delayed meaning that the THL1 was pressed into service for the first three races of the season, its last race being the San Marino Grand Prix. Joining the Australian ex-World Champion in a second car was ex-Ferrari and Renault driver, Frenchman Patrick Tambay. The car would still use the turbocharged Hart engine, but when the THL2 appeared in San Marino for Jones to drive, it was powered by the new, 900 bhp (671 kW; 912 PS) Ford TEC V6 turbo designed by Keith Duckworth and John Baldwin (Duckworth was one of the designers of the highly successful Cosworth DFV engine - the other being Mike Costin). Neither Jones or Tambay would score a point with the Lola Hart THL1. Despite Jones praising the new car and its engine, the team had finally got some speed out of the THL1 with Tambay qualifying 11th, some 2.226 faster and 12 places better than Jones in the THL2.

The car was called a Lola but its only connection to the famous Lola Cars was because of car owner Carl Haas's previous close association with Lola founder Eric Broadley, who was also named as chief engineer for the team in 1985. The THL1 was actually designed by Haas-owned design and construction company known as FORCE (Formula One Race Car Engineering). A member of Neil Oatley's design team was an up-and-coming Ross Brawn, the team's lead aerodynamicist who did most of the wind tunnel testing of both the THL1 and THL2. Lola however earned the team's points towards the Constructors Championships as the team's designated constructor.

== Aftermath ==
During a 2012 interview series with Formula One legends, Alan Jones described the underpowered Hart 415T engine as like "sending a boy to do a mans job", adding that it was an old Formula 2 engine that someone had thrown a turbo on and said "lets go and do Formula One". Up against the financial and technical resources of Ferrari, Renault, Honda, BMW and TAG-Porsche, results were few and far between for those using Brian Hart's engines. The THL1 was the last car to use the turbocharged Hart engine in Formula One.

== Complete Formula One results ==
(key)

Year	Entrant	Engine	Tyres	Driver	1	2	3	4	5	6	7	8	9	10	11	12	13	14	15	16	Pts.	WCC
1985	Team Haas (USA) Ltd.	Hart 415T; S4 tc	G		BRA	POR	SMR	MON	CAN	DET	FRA	GBR	GER	NED	AUT	ITA	BEL	EUR	RSA	AUS	0	NC
1985	Team Haas (USA) Ltd.	Hart 415T; S4 tc	G	Alan Jones												Ret		Ret	DNS	Ret	0	NC
1986	Team Haas (USA) Ltd.	Hart 415T; S4 tc	G		BRA	ESP	SMR	MON	BEL	CAN	DET	FRA	GBR	GER	HUN	AUT	ITA	EUR	MEX	AUS	6*	8th
1986	Team Haas (USA) Ltd.	Hart 415T; S4 tc	G	Alan Jones	Ret	Ret															6*	8th
1986	Team Haas (USA) Ltd.	Hart 415T; S4 tc	G	Patrick Tambay	Ret	8	Ret														6*	8th

* 1986 season points all scored using Lola THL2
