= Cosworth GBA =

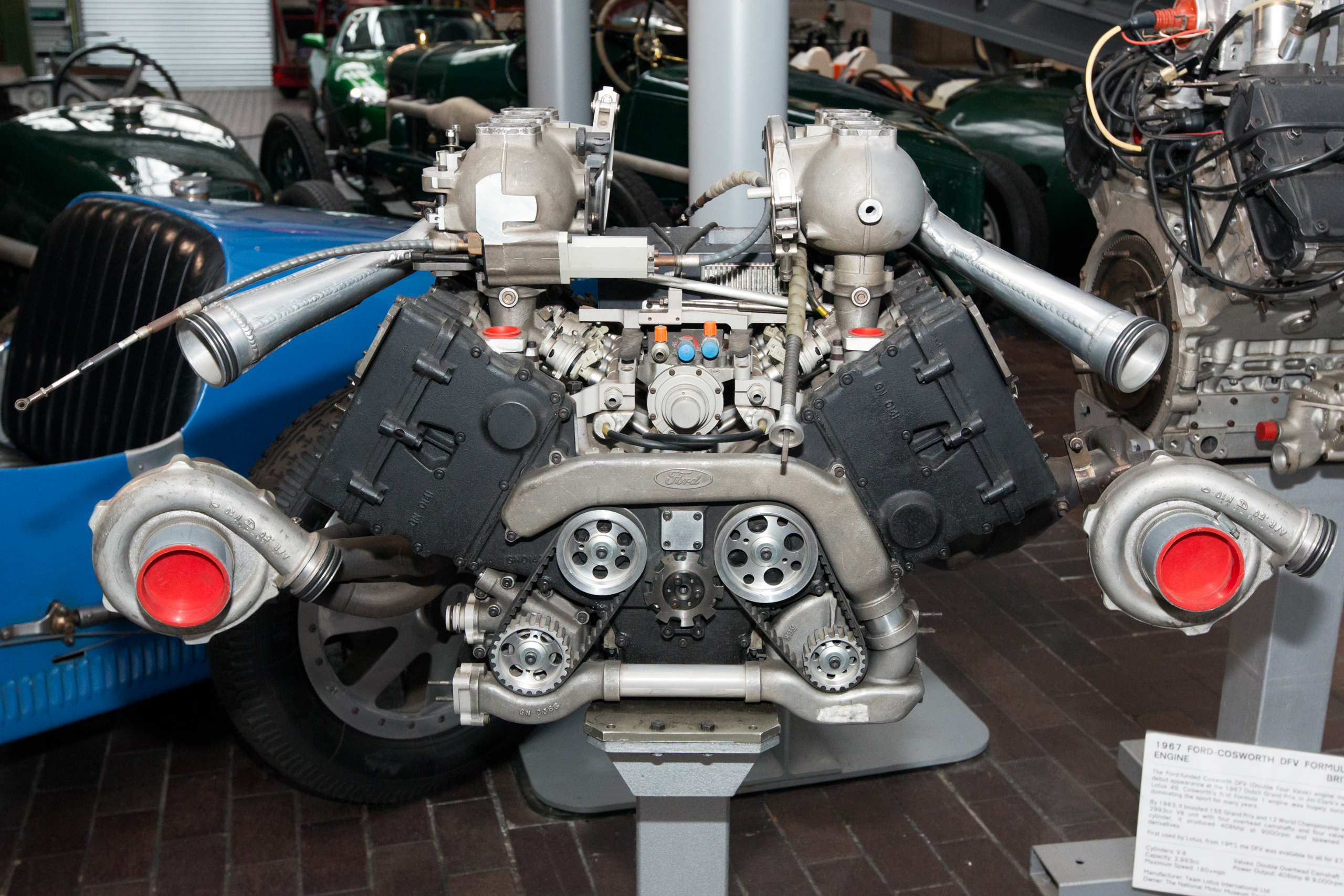
- Ford-Cosworth GBA

Overview
- Manufacturer: (United States) (United Kingdom) Ford–Cosworth
- Designer: Keith Duckworth; Geoff Goddard
- Production: 1986–1987

Layout
- Configuration: 120° V6
- Displacement: 1.5 L (1,498 cc)
- Cylinder bore: 77 mm (3.0 in)
- Piston stroke: 53.6 mm (2.1 in)
- Valvetrain: 24-valve, DOHC, four-valves per cylinder

Combustion
- Turbocharger: Garrett
- Fuel system: Ford–Cosworth EEC-IV Indirect sequential fuel injection

Output
- Power output: 900–1,200 hp (671–895 kW)
- Torque output: approx. 470–630 lb⋅ft (637–854 N⋅m)

Dimensions
- Dry weight: 105 kg (231.5 lb)

Chronology
- Predecessor: Ford–Cosworth DFV
- Successor: Ford–Cosworth DFR

The Ford Cosworth GBA is a turbocharged V6 racing engine, designed and developed by Cosworth, in partnership with Ford, for use in Formula One, from 1986 to 1987. The customer engine was raced by both Lola and Benetton. In the registration lists it appeared under the designations Ford TEC or Ford TEC-Turbo. The GBA was the only turbocharged Formula 1 engine that Cosworth and Ford had in the so-called turbo era, and at the same time the last new development to be used before turbo engines were banned in 1989. The Cosworth GBA competed in 1986 and 1987. Only available to selected Formula 1 teams, it did not score a win in a Formula 1 World Championship round.

== Nomenclature ==
Internally, the turbo engine bears the designation Cosworth GBA. The letter combination "GB" was intended to tie in with the Cosworth GA, Cosworth's first V6 engine from 1973, and to express that the new engine was the second Cosworth unit with this configuration. Apart from that, there was no relationship between the GA and the GB. The 3.4-liter GA was based on the Ford Essex block and was intended for use in touring car racing (Group 2).

To the public, the Cosworth GBA was marketed as the Ford TEC, TEC-Turbo, or TEC-F1; he also appeared in the entry lists for Formula 1 races. The letter combination TEC stood for Turbo Engine Cosworth.

== Development history and background ==
=== DFV–DFR V8s ===
The engine manufacturer Cosworth, founded in 1958 by Keith Duckworth and Mike Costin, in partnership with Ford represented in the Formula One World Championship from 1967 with the 3.0 litre naturally aspirated DFV engine. The DFV, was freely accessible to all teams and dominated Formula One in the 1970s. With 155 world championship races won, 12 drivers' and 10 constructors' titles between the DFV's winning debut with Jim Clark and Lotus at the 1967 Dutch Grand Prix and the DFY's final win through Michele Alboreto and Tyrrell at Detroit in 1983, it is the most successful engine in the history of Formula One. Ford remains, to this day, the 3rd most successful engine manufacturer in F1 history behind Mercedes and Ferrari despite leaving the sport in 2004. No other manufacturer was able to design a similarly competitive naturally aspirated engine. Only with the advent of turbo engines from 1977 did the DFV gradually fall behind. From 1981, the turbo engines were so powerful and reliable that they were able to win regularly and, a little later, also compete in the world championship. Therefore, in the early 1980s, the top and then also the midfield teams switched to turbo engines. From 1983 to 1988, all World Drivers' and Constructors' Championships went to drivers and teams with turbo engines while from 1984 to 1988 all F1GP's were won with turbo power with no naturally aspirated car even (legally) finishing on the podium in the 5 years between the 1983 Dutch Grand Prix when John Watson finished 3rd in his McLaren-Cosworth, and the 1988 Detroit Grand Prix when Thierry Boutsen finished 3rd in his Benetton powered by the then latest upgrade on the DFV, the DFR.

Cosworth reacted to the emerging turbo wave with a wait-and-see attitude. Keith Duckworth, like many at Ford itself including then Ford of Europe Vice President: Walter Hayes, considered the turbocharged engines in Formula One to be inconsistent with the regulations with Hayes saying that he thought turbos were a distortion of the rules and that he didn't believe 1.5 litres turbocharged was the equivalent of 3.0 litres un-turbocharged, and as such both Ford and Cosworth did not deal with supercharged Formula One engines at all until 1982. A supercharged version of the DFV was created at Cosworth; however, this engine, called DFX, with a displacement of 2.65 liters was only intended for US racing series (CART). In Formula One, on the other hand, the company stayed with the naturally aspirated engine concept for a long time. The DFV was further developed into the DFY by early 1983, and won its final three Formula One races in that year (4 if Keke Rosberg's win in the non-championship Race of Champions at Brands Hatch is counted). By the start of 1985, only Minardi and Tyrrell had DFY engines, which now produced only around 570 bhp (425 kW; 578 PS), at least 300 bhp (224 kW; 304 PS) less than the more powerful of the turbocharged engines just in race trim (and around 600 bhp (447 kW; 608 PS) less in qualifying). And by two thirds of the way through the season the DFY was gone altogether with Minardi switching to the Italian made Motori Moderni V6 turbo by Round 3 of the season and Tyrrell from Round 7 using the French Renault turbos in at least one of its two cars. By the 1985 Dutch Grand Prix, 18 years after the DFV's debut, the engine was all but gone from Formula One.

The DFV's last Formula One Grand Prix really only came about due to a team not having their actual F1 car ready. The new for 1988 team BMS Scuderia Italia team had opted to have Dallara build their chassis which would for that season would use the Cosworth built, 3.5L Ford DFZ V8. However, by the time of the opening race of the season in Brazil, the new Dallara F188 chassis was not yet ready. So, to avoid a fine for not attending all of the races, the team instead entered with the Dallara 3087 Formula 3000 chassis for their Italian driver Alex Caffi. Although the car passed F1 scrutineering in Brazil, the car could only be fitted with the 3.0L DFV, giving Caffi a severe power disadvantage. Two and a half seasons after the DFV was last seen in a Grand Prix when Martin Brundle failed to qualify his Tyrrell for the 1985 Austrian Grand Prix, Caffi failed to pre-qualify.

To highlight the speed difference between the DFY and the turbos, during qualifying for the 1985 French Grand Prix at the Circuit Paul Ricard, on the tracks 1.8 km (1.1 mi) long Mistral Straight, Swiss driver Marc Surer clocked what was at the time the highest speed recorded by a Formula One car when he pushed his turbocharged, Brabham-BMW (which in qualifying trim was alleged to be producing approximately 1,150 bhp (858 kW; 1,166 PS) that year) to 335 km/h (208 mph). This compared to the slowest car in the race, the lone naturally aspirated Tyrrell Ford-Cosworth DFY of Stefan Bellof which could only manage 277 km/h (172 mph).

=== Turbos ===
Ford had been pushing for the development of a turbo engine for Formula One since 1981. Because of Duckworth's hesitant attitude, Ford temporarily considered cooperation with the German company in this area Racing team Zakspeed, who had experience with turbocharged engines for more than ten years of racing Ford's cars including Escorts, Capris and Mustangs. Indeed, when Zakspeed entered Formula One as a manufacturer in 1985, their self built 4 cylinder turbo engine, the Zakspeed 1500/4, was allegedly based on a Ford engine block.

When Duckworth put the idea that they should "start again" and build and develop a new turbo engine in the summer of 1984 to Ford's head of Motorsport Mike Kranefuss while the pair were touring the pits together during practice for the British Grand Prix at Brands Hatch, Ford decided to continue working with Cosworth. Development work on the Cosworth Turbo began in the fall of 1984 when all of the top teams had turbocharged engines and no team had actually been chosen for the new engine. McLaren had their Porsche built TAG turbo V6, Williams had Japanese V6 Honda power, Brabham had the powerful 4 cyl BMW engine, Renault, the pioneers of turbo power in F1 back in 1977 powered not only their own factory team with their in-house V6 turbo, but also Team Lotus and the French Ligiers, while Ferrari and Alfa Romeo who had their own in-house built V6 and V8 turbos respectively.

The development process was not linear and Cosworth faced a somewhat compressed schedule with Mike Kranefuss and Walter Hayes giving until November 1985 as the deadline for the delivery of a race ready engine. In the first phase, Cosworth designed an inline four-cylinder engine derived from the BDA series and based on an engine block from the Ford Escort and the first test engine was on Cosworth's in-house dynamometer by September 1984. Duckworth originally chose the 4 cylinder as he believed they were more compact and economical than a V6, though Cosworth's Chief Race Engine Designer Geoff Goddard was never happy with the idea, but out of respect for Duckworth's track record and position within the company, let him run with it. Over the course of 3 weeks, unsolvable problems with the load capacity of the crankshaft arose in which 6 different engines all experienced the same crankshaft issues when the engine was turbocharged (the original test engine block actually changed shape when it failed). In its original naturally aspirated form, the engine had been limited to a maximum of 10,500 rpm. Turbocharged, the engine had its first major failure soon after reaching 11,000 rpm for the first time, and only at 2.0 bar boost pressure which was well under the expected race and qualifying pressures (by 1986, qualifying boost pressures in Formula One were said to be as high as 5.6 Bar with anywhere between 4.0 and 5.0 Bar used for racing). After the gloom of the 4 cylinder turbo project's continued failure, towards the end of 1984 Ford agreed to a full development budget and the decision was then made for a second concept, which meant a completely new design. Cosworth opted for a 120 degree V6 engine because as Duckworth explained, those who were being successful at the time were using V6 engines and Cosworth felt any future rule changes would be to suit the V6 turbos. Internally the engine received the designation GBA.

The design and development of the GBA was led by Geoff Goddard with Duckworth helping to design the engine (Duckworth would be publicly credited with the engine's design). The first drawings were made in December 1984, and the first prototype was run on the test bench by Cosworth's Chief Test Engineer Allan Morris on August 1, 1985. Although the GBA engine was designed and built with a traditional twin-turbo set up so as to be easily fitted into the usual parameters of a Formula One car, Duckworth, who believed that turbo energy was just wasted energy, ultimately planned to actually revive a pre-war 1930s concept called Compounding where the twin-turbos would be removed and instead there would be a single turbo located on top of the engine.

Despite the highly compressed schedule given by Ford, and with the loss of around 2 months on the 4 cylinder project, Cosworth had managed to design and manufacture a brand new 1.5 litre, turbocharged V6 Formula One engine in just 9 months. In February 1986 the first test drives took place at a bitterly cold (–6 °Celsius) and icy Boreham Proving Ground with Haas Lola drivers, 1980 World Champion Alan Jones, and former factory Ferrari and Renault driver Patrick Tambay, giving the engine its first run in a race car. Both drivers reported the engine was smooth, but well down on power as it was only running 2.5 Bar boost pressure, about half of the expected qualifying boost pressure. Although the biggest problem was simply that the engine was not designed to be run under Arctic conditions with Jones reporting that after around 10 laps of the 4.76 km (3.0 mi) circuit, its operating temperature had only just risen above the desired 80° Celsius even with the radiators purposefully blocked off. Two months later the engine made its debut in a Formula One race at the 1986 San Marino Grand Prix with Jones at the wheel while Tambay drove the old car powered by a 4-cylinder Hart 415T turbo. Jones qualified in 21st place but failed to finish the race due to overheating, the result of a holed radiator.

The engine was only used in 1986 and 1987. A total of 25 blocks were built, which Cosworth took care of, unlike in the case of the DFV. In 1987, Cosworth employed about 100 people for the GBA alone. When the FISA imposed strict regulations for turbo engines for the 1988 season, reducing the permissible boost pressure from 1987s 4.0 bar to 2.5 bar and reducing the allowed fuel down from 195 litres to just 150, Ford discontinued the GBA program: The new rules would have required extensive adjustments to the engine and its electronic engine management system strategy, which since turbo engines were to be completely banned from 1989, was considered uneconomical. Cosworth concentrated in the future again on 3.5 litre naturally aspirated engines: For the preferred customer Benetton. The DFZ was developed for 1987 and would be available for the smaller customer teams through to the end of 1988. Benetton had exclusive use of the upgraded DFR for 1988, but that engine would become ubiquitous by 1989 with the DFZ no longer in use in Formula One. By mid-1989 however, Benetton would have exclusive use of the new HB series Ford-Cosworth V8s which that year gave approximately 640 bhp (477 kW; 649 PS) compared to around 620 bhp (462 kW; 629 PS) for the DFR and only about 590 bhp (440 kW; 598 PS) for the DFZ.

The Cosworth GBA was a compact V6 engine that was 450mm long and 510mm high. With regard to the number of cylinders, Cosworth was based on the successful TAG engine from Porsche. However, at 120 degrees, it was more in line with the 120 degree V6 that Ferrari had been running since 1981 rather than the 80 degree Honda or the 90 degree TAG-Porsche and Renault, which were designed to be particularly narrow with a view to profiled underbodies. Because smooth underbodies were mandatory from 1983, Cosworth no longer had to take such aspects into account. The engine block and cylinder heads were made of aluminium alloy. The displacement was 1498 cm^{3}. Cosworth did not disclose bore and stroke dimensions, but outside engineers estimate values of 78 mm (bore) × 52.18 mm (stroke). The cylinder running surfaces were coated with Nikasil. Each cylinder had two intakes and two exhaust valves. The valves were at an angle of 40 degrees to each other. There were two overhead camshafts for each bank of cylinders, driven by chains seen for the first time in Formula One since the Australian designed and built Repco-Brabham V8 engines of the mid-late 1960s. The GBA had twin turbochargers designed by Garrett, operating in a single stage. The ignition system was supplied by Magneti Marelli. When the original engine was first put together by Cosworth's Alan Eldridge, the pistons were German made Mahle. Cosworth had originally intended to manufacture their own pistons for the GBA once the engine was proven, but it was later found to be more cost effective to continue using the Mahle pistons. The engine electronics were a Ford-Cosworth development (EEC-IV) in conjunction with American-based Motorola. The electronics and the engine management system team was headed up by Steve Taylor, a British Electronics Engineer with Cosworth, Ford America software expert Jim Coats, and American Motorola Electrical Engineer Frank Rayo. The entire electronics program was overseen by Ford USA's Head of Electronic Engine Development, Bob Stelmaszak. All of the modules that would be used to carry the engine management system on the cars would be designed in the UK but manufactured in the US, while almost all of the software development and electronics programming took place in the UK or at the various Formula one race circuits around the world.

The first engines had a compression ratio of 6.5:1. Over the course of the season, Cosworth gradually increased the compression ratio to 7.5:1 and eventually to 8.0:1. After starting at 700 bhp (522 kW; 710 PS) for qualifying, the engines increased to around 900 bhp (671 kW; 912 PS) hp towards the end of the 1986 season. In the second half of the 1987 season, this achievement was finally achieved in the race. The performance of the Cosworth engines was thus slightly higher than that of the Honda engines.

== Racing inserts ==
Unlike the DFV, the GBA was not a commonly available engine. The decision as to which teams were allowed to use the TEC turbo rested exclusively with Ford. For the years 1986 to 1988, Ford awarded the engine exclusively to Team Haas (USA), based in Colnbrook near Heathrow in west London. Cosworth was critical of the decision because while Haas had a solid history in American CART racing (indeed, the Newman/Haas Racing team's CART driver was no less than 1978 Formula One World Champion Mario Andretti), its Formula One debut would not be until late in the 1985 season. In Ford's opinion, the prospect of financial support from the Beatrice group (also sponsors of the Haas CART team) initially spoke in favor of Haas, which ultimately only came about to a very limited extent. In fact, Haas only used the engine in 1986 as with Beatrice going through a management change the Chicago based company pulled its sponsorship midway through 1986 and the Formula One team only lasted until the end of the year.

At the end of the year, team founder Carl Haas sold his team's company (FORCE - Formula One Race Car Engineering) and equipment to Formula One boss Bernie Ecclestone, who was also the owner of the Brabham team. With Brabham losing its BMW engines after the company pulled out of F1 at the end of 1986 (only allowing Brabham to use their engines in 1987 to honour their contract), Ecclestone wanted to use this detour to forward the GBA engines to Brabham for 1987 and 1988 access. However, Ford terminated the engine contract with Haas, so that ultimately neither Haas nor Ecclestone had access to the turbos. The Cosworth GBA instead went to the Benetton team in 1987, who used it in two cars that season. In 1988 the TEC-F1 was no longer used.

=== Team Haas ===
The TEC made its debut in the 1986 San Marino Grand Prix with Team Haas (USA), alternatively referred to in the media as Haas-Lola, Beatrice, Beatrice-Lola, or FORCE-Lola. Haas has been active in Formula One since 1985. The team had contested its first season with British turbo engines from Hart as at the time the new Ford V6 was still under development. Haas also started the second season with Hart engines. Drivers were Alan Jones and Patrick Tambay. At the third race of the season in Imola, the Cosworth GBA was ready for use, but initially, the team only had one engine available. The team only had one of the new THL2 cars available with Jones getting the drive while Tambay had to race the old Hart powered THL1 one last time. Although Jones was the senior driver in the team not only being the first signed, but also having won 12 races and a World Championship compared to only 2 wins for Tambay, the Frenchman felt that he should have been given the first race of the new Ford V6 as he had done most of the pre-season testing with the new car and engine in England while most of the testing Jones did was in Rio with the race team and the older THL1. It would be the start of some tension between the drivers and while there was never any outright animosity in the way Ayrton Senna and Alain Prost would famously have as teammates, in reality Jones and Tambay were teammates in name only.

At Imola the new THL2 with its Ford engine was clearly inferior to the old THL1 with the team finally getting some good speed from the Hart turbo in its swansong race. In qualifying, Jones was almost three seconds slower than Tambay. In the race, Jones retired after 28 laps with an overheated engine caused by a stone punching a hole in one of the car's radiators. From Monaco, both Haas Lolas started with the Cosworth turbo. During the 1986 season, the THL2 suffered from a lack of power from the Ford turbo with both Jones and Tambay lamenting Ford and Cosworth continually turning down their requests to build special, more powerful qualifying engines. Another major part of the problem was reliability. While it was not always the engine or turbo that was the cause, Jones retired ten times out of 14 races with the car, Tambay just as often out of 13 races. However, there were also three finishes in the points: Jones finished fourth at the Austrian Grand Prix, his cause helped by a slipping clutch meaning less wheelspin thus no need to stop for tyres, though he still ended up 2 laps down, and in the subsequent race in Italy, the team's 1 year anniversary in Formula One having started at the 1985 Italian Grand Prix, he finished sixth. Tambay took fifth place in Austria. In the warm-up for the Canadian Grand Prix, Tambay crashed after a driving error. He sustained injuries to his feet that prevented him from racing in Montréal and a week later in Detroit. In the US, Eddie Cheever took over instead the second car from Haas (and proved faster, as Tambay would during most qualifying sessions, than an increasingly demotivated Jones who later admitted he really only ever signed to race F1 again for the money). Overall, Haas scored six championship points in 1986 and finished eighth in the constructors' championship. Already in the early summer of 1986, the end of the racing team became apparent. The reason for this was on the one hand the sporting results, which fell short of the - unrealistically high - expectations, on the other hand, the team's economic difficulties with Beatrice pulling its sponsorship midway through the season. The 1987 season would have required a new sponsor, which Haas could not find. In October 1986, Haas shut down the racing team.

During qualifying for the Italian Grand Prix at the fast Monza Circuit, Alan Jones claimed to have had a heated discussion with engine designer Keith Duckworth about the need for more powerful qualifying engines. Jones claimed he was able to point out the "block of flats" rear wings run by Benetton (BMW), Williams (Honda), Arrows (BMW) and Ferrari, yet the slowest of them, the Ferrari F1/86 of Michele Alboreto, was still around 20 km/h (12 mph) faster in a straight line than the Lolas which were running the bare minimum wing settings for speed on the straights while still having some grip in the turns. With the lack of straight line speed and only minimal downforce, the closest time either driver could post to Teo Fabi's pole winning BMW powered Benetton B186 was Tambay who was 3.73 seconds slower. Despite this, Duckworth, Ford and Cosworth still refused to budge on qualifying engines. The demotivation Jones was feeling in 1986 actually came to a head when he deliberately spun out of the Portuguese Grand Prix on lap 11 on the corner where the Haas motorhome was located. Reasoning that he would be wasting his time in the race, Jones deliberately spun where he did so he could quickly get changed, catch a helicopter to the Lisbon Airport and be on his way back to London before the race was even over.

Both Alan Jones and Patrick Tambay retired from Formula One following the 1986 season.

=== Benetton ===
Alex Hawkridge, the owner of British racing team Toleman, had sold the team to its major sponsor, Italian fashion house Benetton in early 1986 with the team subsequently being renamed Benetton Formula. While Toleman had used Hart engines for six years, in his first season Benetton started and scored a win with customer engines from BMW. For the 1987 season, Benetton received the Cosworth GBA engines exclusively. The emergency vehicle was the Rory Byrne-designed Benetton B187, a development of the previous year's BMW-powered B186. Drivers throughout the season were Italian driver Teo Fabi and Belgian Thierry Boutsen. In Cosworth's opinion, Benetton was structurally better positioned than Haas, so efficient further development of the turbo engine was possible.

Boutsen and Fabi almost always qualified for the first five rows with the Cosworth GBA. The best qualifying result was Boutsen's third starting position in the penultimate race in Japan, plus several fourth starting positions. Boutsen finished nine times and Fabi seven times. After numerous technical failures at the beginning of the season, most of the drivers reached the finish line in the second half of the year. Boutsen finished nine, Fabi seven races with finishes. The Benetton-Fords scored regularly. Both drivers finished third once (Fabi in Austria, Boutsen after the disqualification of Ayrton Senna in Japan). There were also three fourth and five fifth places. At the end of the year, Benetton was fifth in the constructors' championship with 28 points. In the hands of Boutsen, the GBA actually led two F1 races in 1987. The Belgian driver briefly led the season opening Brazilian Grand Prix for half a lap (though he wasn't counted as leading a lap as he never led over the start/finish line before being overtaken by the Williams Honda of Nelson Piquet. Boutsen had taken the lead when Piquet had pitted for tyres), while he would later lead for 13 laps of the Mexican Grand Prix.

== Applications ==
- Lola THL2
- Benetton B187

== Gallery ==
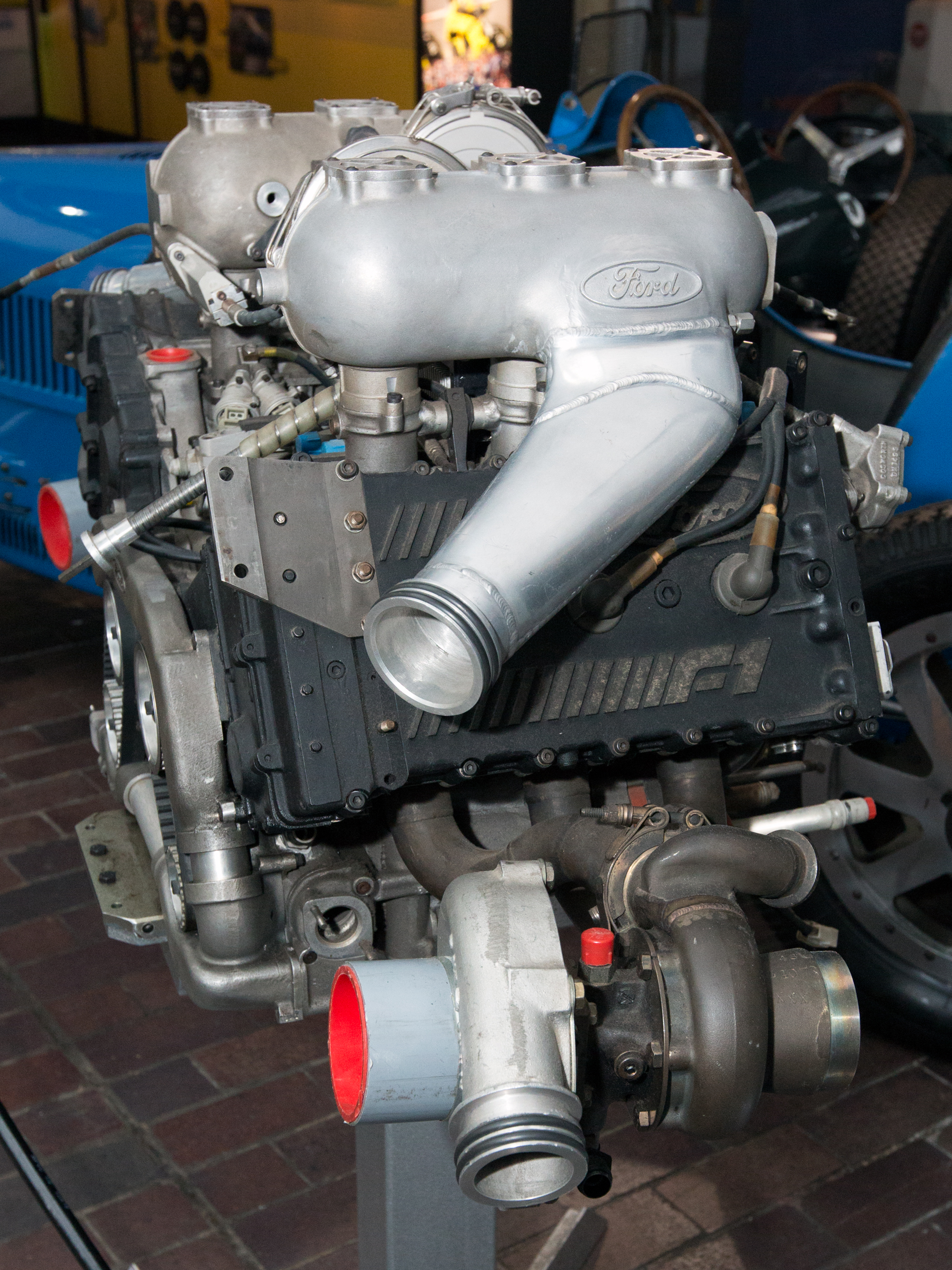
Side-view

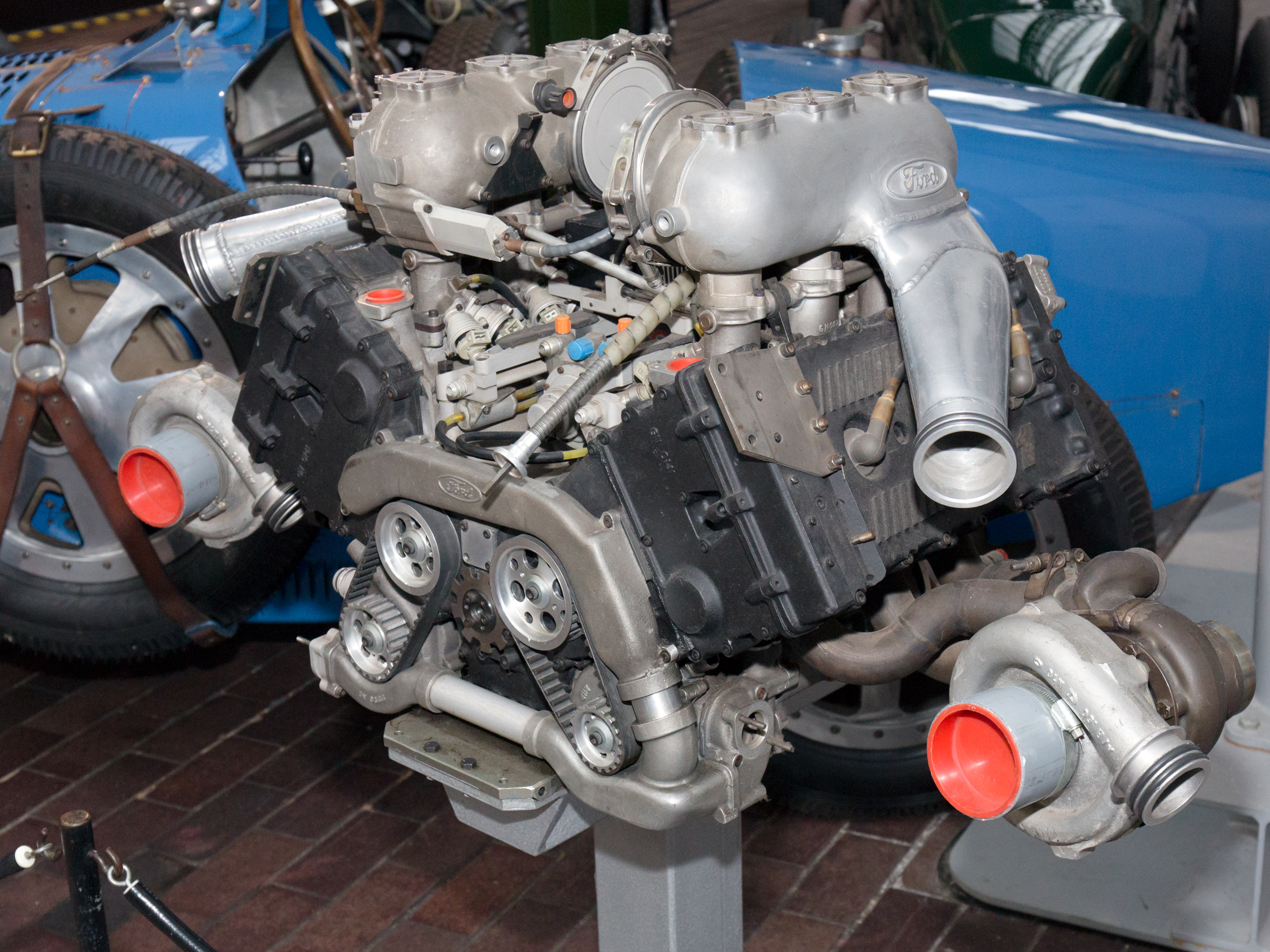
Front-right view
