= Toleman TG184 =

Formula One racing car

Toleman TG184 Toleman TG184B
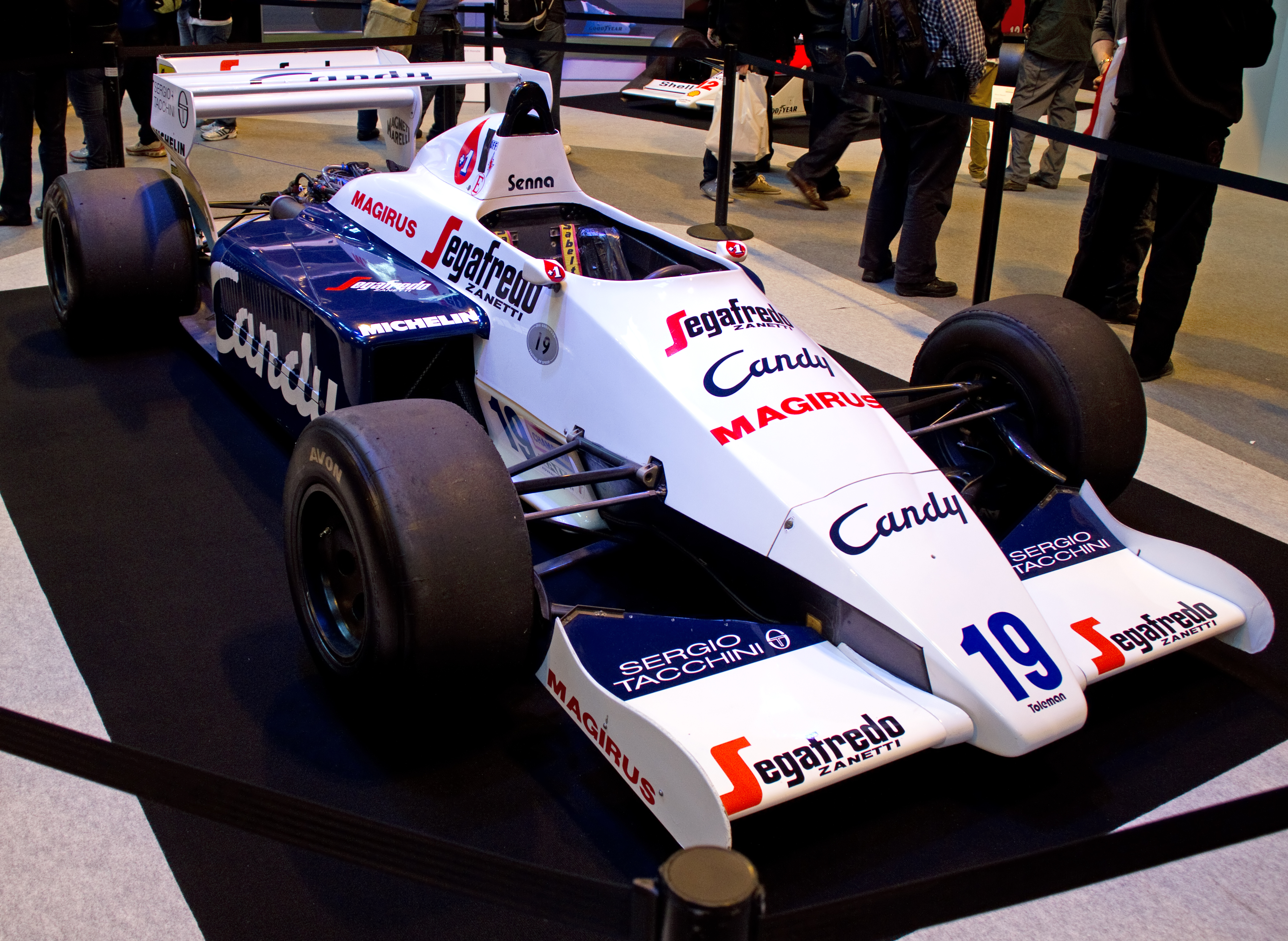
- The TG184 of Ayrton Senna on display at the 2012 Autosport International
- Category: Formula One
- Constructor: Toleman
- Designers: Rory Byrne; Pat Symonds; Brian Hart (engine)
- Predecessor: TG183B
- Successor: TG185

Technical specifications
- Chassis: Carbon fibre monocoque
- Suspension (front): double wishbones, pull-rod actuated coil springs over dampers
- Suspension (rear): double wishbones, push-rod actuated coil springs over dampers
- Axle track: Front: 1,765 mm (69.5 in); Rear: 1,676 mm (66.0 in)
- Wheelbase: 2,800 mm (110 in)
- Engine: Hart 415T, 1,459 cc (89.0 cu in), Straight 4, turbo, mid-engine, longitudinally mounted
- Transmission: Hewland 5-speed manual
- Fuel: Agip
- Tyres: Michelin

Competition history
- Notable entrants: Toleman Group Motorsport
- Notable drivers: 19. (Brazil) Ayrton Senna; 20. (Venezuela) Johnny Cecotto; 19. / 20. (Sweden) Stefan Johansson; 20. (Italy) Pierluigi Martini
- Debut: 1984 French Grand Prix
- Last event: 1984 Portuguese Grand Prix
Races	Wins	Podiums	Poles	F/Laps
12	0	3	0	1
- Constructors' Championships: 0
- Drivers' Championships: 0

The Toleman TG184 is a Formula One racing car designed by Rory Byrne and Pat Symonds and was used by Toleman Motorsport during the majority of the 1984 Formula One season.

== Engine ==
Like its predecessor, the TG183B, the TG184 was powered by the 4 cylinder turbocharged Hart 415T engine which produced approximately 600 bhp (447 kW; 608 PS) in 1984.

== Racing history ==
It was first raced at the French Grand Prix at Dijon.

The car's potential was evident early on with a second place in only its second grand prix scored by then rookie driver Ayrton Senna in the rain affected Monaco Grand Prix. Senna, who started 13th, sliced through the field with precision until he caught and passed race leader Alain Prost (McLaren-TAG) just before the start/finish line on lap 32 as Clerk of Course Jacky Ickx showed the red flag to stop the race due to adverse conditions. However, the rules stated that positions must be taken from the lap prior to the flag being shown. This saw Prost win and Senna finish second with only half points given due to the race not going past 50% of the scheduled distance. It was widely perceived that Ickx had denied Senna, Toleman, and engine supplier Hart their first Grand Prix win, although the team later revealed that Senna's TG184 had suffered suspension damage which they estimated would only have lasted another 3 or 4 laps in any case.

Underlying his future as a World Champion, more podiums came for Senna during the 1984 season with 3rd placings at both the British Grand Prix and the season ending Portuguese Grand Prix where Senna also placed 3rd in qualifying, the highest for the car. The podium finish at Monaco was the first for what is now the Alpine F1 Team.

Others to drive the TG184 during 1984 were former FIM 350cc and Formula 750 motorcycle World Champion Johnny Cecotto from Venezuela and up and coming F1 drivers Stefan Johansson of Sweden and Pierluigi Martini from Italy. Unfortunately for Cecotto, the TG184 was his last F1 drive after he badly broke both of his ankles in practice for the British Grand Prix at Brands Hatch. He recovered from his injuries but never again raced in Formula One, instead going on to a successful career as a touring car driver.

The TG184 was replaced in 1985 by the TG185.

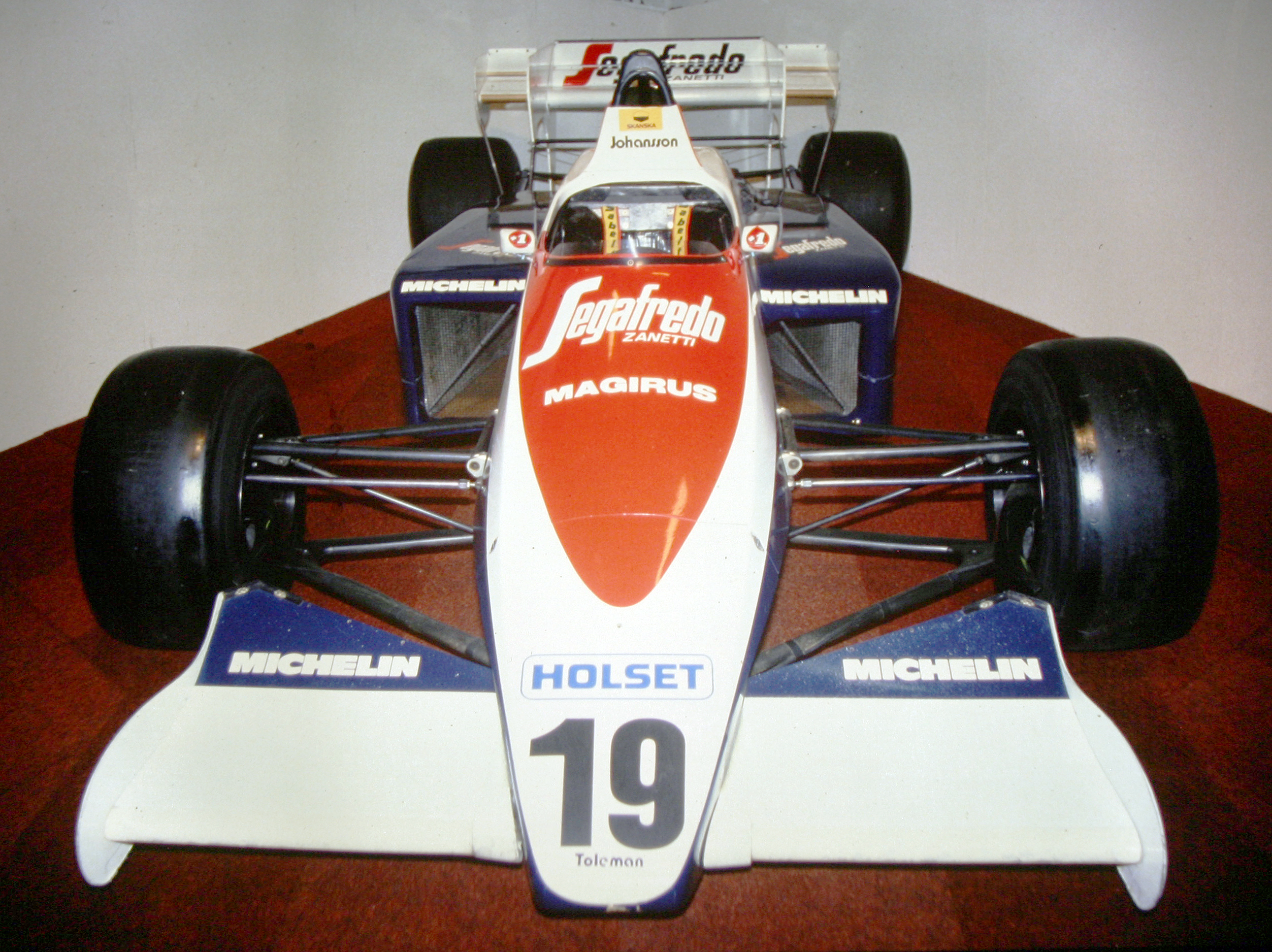
The Toleman TG184 as raced by Stefan Johansson at the end of the 1984 season

== Complete Formula One results ==
(key) (Results shown in italics indicate fastest lap)

Year	Entrant	Engine	Tyres	Driver	1	2	3	4	5	6	7	8	9	10	11	12	13	14	15	16	Pts.	WCC
1984	Toleman Group Motorsport	Hart 415T; S4 tc	P MI		BRA	RSA	BEL	SMR	FRA	MON	CAN	DET	DAL	GBR	GER	AUT	NED	ITA	EUR	POR	16*	7th
1984	Toleman Group Motorsport	Hart 415T; S4 tc	P MI	Ayrton Senna					Ret	2	7	Ret	Ret	3	Ret	Ret	Ret		Ret	3	16*	7th
1984	Toleman Group Motorsport	Hart 415T; S4 tc	P MI	Johnny Cecotto					Ret	Ret	9	Ret	Ret	DNQ							16*	7th
1984	Toleman Group Motorsport	Hart 415T; S4 tc	P MI	Stefan Johansson														4	Ret	11	16*	7th
1984	Toleman Group Motorsport	Hart 415T; S4 tc	P MI	Pierluigi Martini														DNQ			16*	7th

* 2 points scored using the Toleman TG183B
