= Toleman TG183 =

Formula One racing car

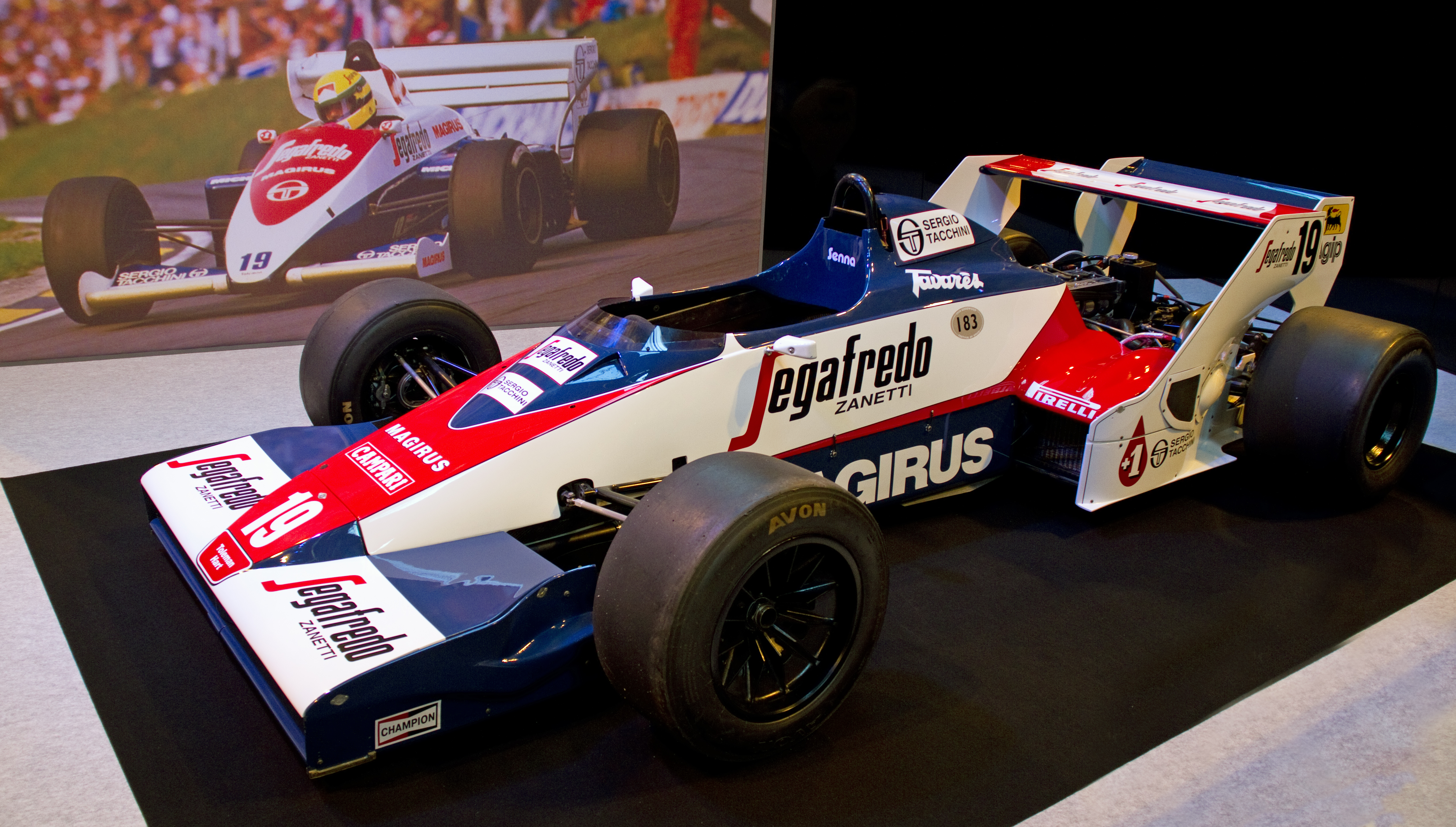
- The TG183B of Ayrton Senna at the 2012 Autosport International
- Category: Formula One
- Constructor: Toleman
- Designers: Rory Byrne (Chief Designer); John Gentry (Assistant Designer)
- Predecessor: TG181C
- Successor: TG184

Technical specifications
- Chassis: Carbon fibre Monocoque with semi-stressed engine
- Suspension (front): double wishbones, pull-rod actuated coil springs over dampers
- Suspension (rear): double wishbones, push-rod actuated coil springs over dampers
- Engine: Hart 415T, 1,459 cc (89.0 cu in), Straight 4, turbo, mid-engine, longitudinally mounted
- Transmission: Hewland 5-speed manual
- Fuel: Agip
- Tyres: Pirelli

Competition history
- Notable entrants: Candy Toleman Motorsport; Toleman Group Motorsport
- Notable drivers: 35. (United Kingdom) Derek Warwick; 36. (Italy) Bruno Giacomelli; 19. (Brazil) Ayrton Senna; 20. (Venezuela) Johnny Cecotto
- Debut: 1982 Italian Grand Prix
- Last event: 1984 San Marino Grand Prix
Races	Wins	Poles	F/Laps
21	0	0	0
- Constructors' Championships: 0
- Drivers' Championships: 0

The Toleman TG183 was a Formula One racing car designed by Rory Byrne and built and raced by Toleman Motorsport.

== Design ==
The TG183 was distinctive in that it had twin rear wings and front wing mounted radiators. Unfortunately the front wing configuration caused the front of the car to move about at high speed and was eventually replaced by a more conventional front wing set up.

== Competition summary ==
The car first raced in the last two races of the 1982 Formula One season driven by Derek Warwick. In the 1983 Formula One season an updated version of the car, designated TG183B, was introduced and Warwick was joined at Toleman by Bruno Giacomelli. The car also raced in the first four races of the 1984 Formula One season when Ayrton Senna made his debut in the Formula 1 championship alongside former FIM 350cc and Formula 750 motorcycle World Champion Johnny Cecotto from Venezuela.

The TG183B's last race meeting, the 1984 San Marino Grand Prix saw the only time that Ayrton Senna would fail to qualify for a Grand Prix. After a dispute with tyre supplier Pirelli which saw the team switch to Michelin, Toleman sat out the first day of qualifying rather than use the Italian rubber. In the second, wet qualifying session Senna's Hart 415T engine suffered a fuel pressure problem at the Tosa section of the Imola circuit, the furthest part of the track from the pits. He was unable to get back to the pits in time to record a time.

The TG183B was replaced after four races of 1984 by the Toleman TG184.

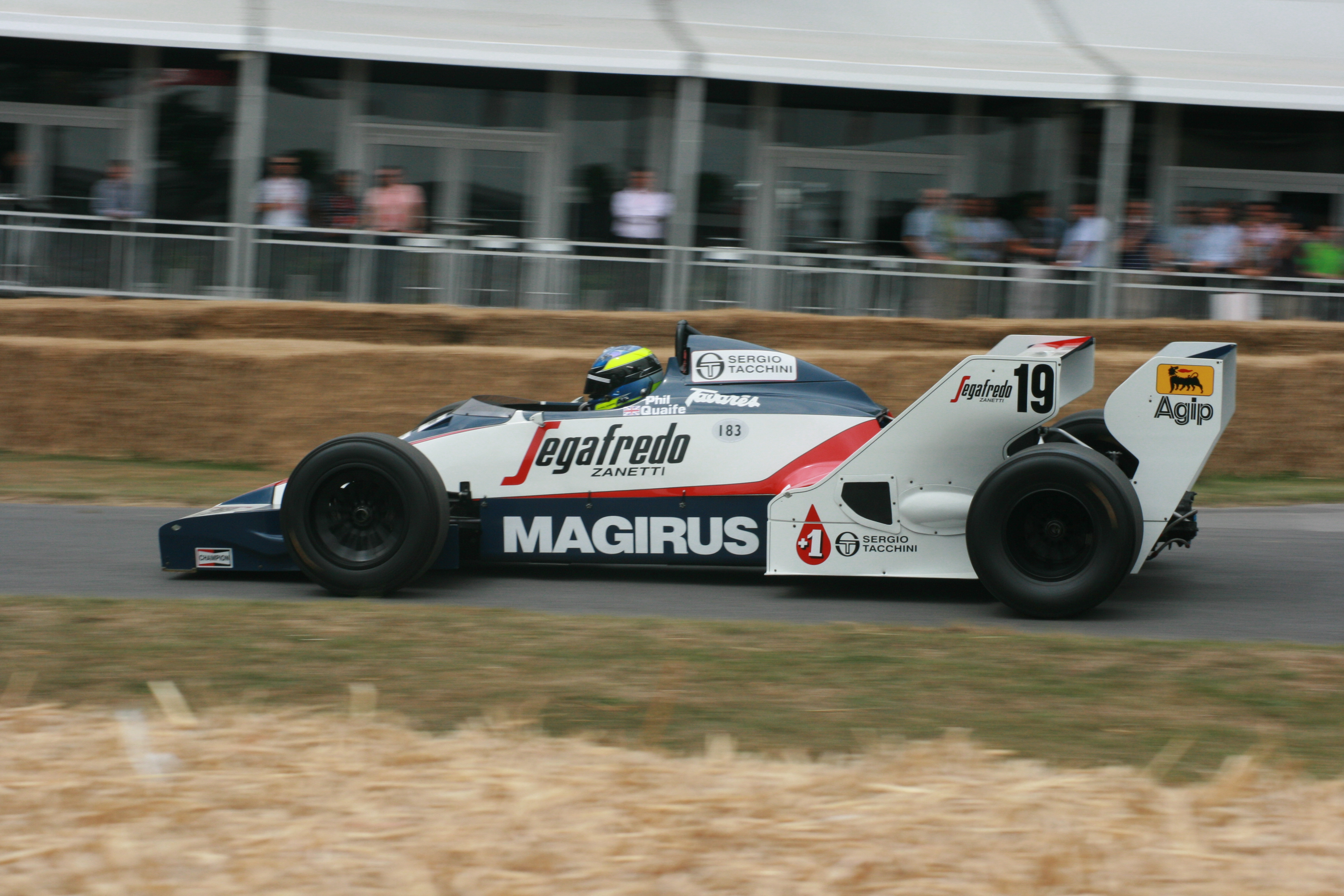
The TG183B at the 2010 Goodwood Festival of Speed.

Toleman TG183B at Goodwood Festival of Speed 2010

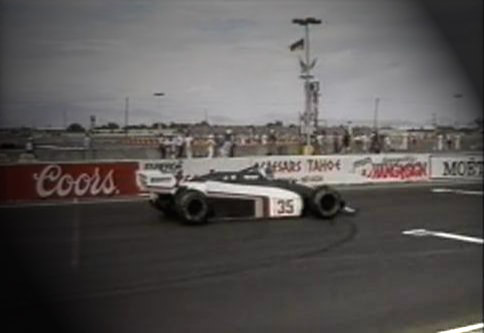
The first version of the TG183, as used in the last two Grands Prix of 1982

== Complete Formula One World Championship results ==
(key)

Year	Entrant	Engine	Tyres	Drivers	1	2	3	4	5	6	7	8	9	10	11	12	13	14	15	16	Pts.	WCC
1982	Candy Toleman Motorsport	Hart 415T 1.5 S4 tc	P		RSA	BRA	USW	SMR	BEL	MON	DET	CAN	NED	GBR	FRA	GER	AUT	SUI	ITA	CPL	0	NC
1982	Candy Toleman Motorsport	Hart 415T 1.5 S4 tc	P	Derek Warwick															Ret	Ret	0	NC
1983	Candy Toleman Motorsport	Hart 415T 1.5 S4 tc	P		BRA	USW	FRA	SMR	MON	BEL	DET	CAN	GBR	GER	AUT	NED	ITA	EUR	RSA		10	9th
1983	Candy Toleman Motorsport	Hart 415T 1.5 S4 tc	P	Derek Warwick	8	Ret	Ret	Ret	Ret	7	Ret	Ret	Ret	Ret	Ret	4	6	5	4		10	9th
1983	Candy Toleman Motorsport	Hart 415T 1.5 S4 tc	P	Bruno Giacomelli	Ret	Ret	13	Ret	DNQ	8	9	Ret	Ret	Ret	Ret	13	7	6	Ret		10	9th
1984	Toleman Group Motorsport	Hart 415T 1.5 S4 tc	P		BRA	RSA	BEL	SMR	FRA	MON	CAN	DET	DAL	GBR	GER	AUT	NED	ITA	EUR	POR	16^{1}	7th
1984	Toleman Group Motorsport	Hart 415T 1.5 S4 tc	P	Ayrton Senna	Ret	6	6	DNQ													16^{1}	7th
1984	Toleman Group Motorsport	Hart 415T 1.5 S4 tc	P	Johnny Cecotto	Ret	Ret	Ret	NC													16^{1}	7th

^1 14 points scored in 1984 using the Toleman TG184.
