= Lola THL2 =

Formula One car

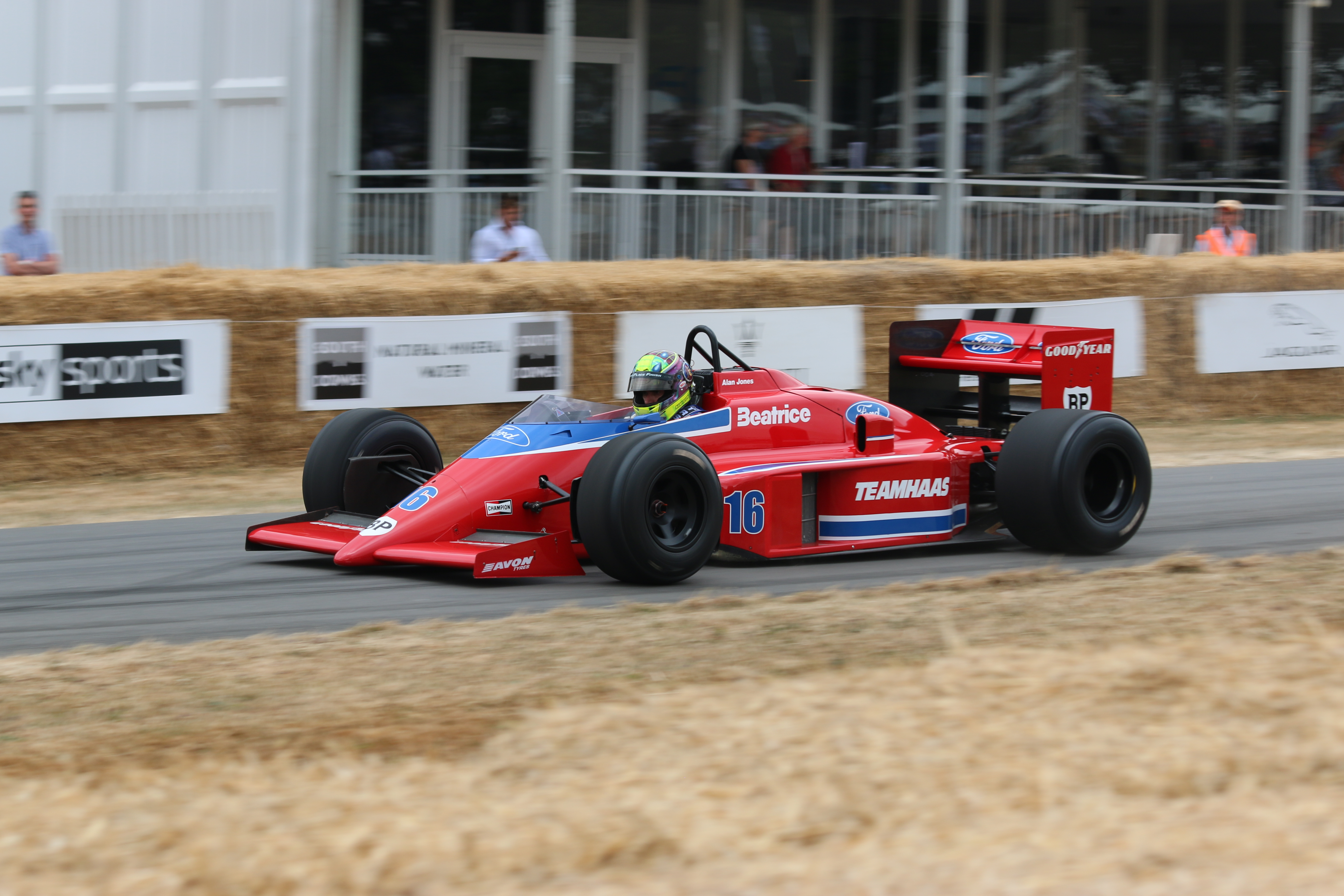
- A THL2 demonstrated at the 2018 Goodwood Festival of Speed
- Category: Formula One
- Constructor: Team Haas (USA) Ltd.
- Designers: Neil Oatley (Technical Director); John Baldwin (Chief Designer); Ross Brawn (Chief Aerodynamicist); Adrian Newey (Assistant Aerodynamicist); Keith Duckworth (Engine Technical Director (Ford-Cosworth)); Geoff Goddard (Chief Engine Designer (Ford-Cosworth)); Eric Broadley (Senior Engineer (Honorary))
- Predecessor: THL1

Technical specifications
- Chassis: Carbon fibre with aluminium honeycomb monocoque
- Suspension (front): Double wishbones, push-rod and rocker actuated coil springs over dampers, anti-roll bar
- Suspension (rear): Double wishbones, push-rod and rocker actuated coil springs over dampers, anti-roll bar
- Axle track: Front: 1,803 mm (71.0 in); Rear: 1,625 mm (64.0 in)
- Wheelbase: 2,794 mm (110.0 in)
- Engine: Ford TEC, 1,498 cc (91.4 cu in), 120° V6, twin turbocharged, mid-engine, longitudinally mounted
- Transmission: Hewland / FORCE 6-speed manual
- Weight: 545 kg (1,202 lb)
- Fuel: BP
- Tyres: Goodyear

Competition history
- Notable entrants: Team Haas (USA) Ltd.
- Notable drivers: 15. (Australia) Alan Jones; 16. (France) Patrick Tambay; 16. (United States) Eddie Cheever
- Debut: 1986 San Marino Grand Prix
| Races | Wins | Poles | F/Laps |
|---|---|---|---|
| 14 | 0 | 0 | 0 |
- Constructors' Championships: 0
- Drivers' Championships: 0

The Lola THL2 was a Formula One racing car designed by Neil Oatley for FORCE and was used by Team Haas (USA) Ltd. during the 1986 Formula One season. Two of the FORCE aerodynamicists who worked on the car during its countless hours of Wind tunnel testing were a young Ross Brawn and Adrian Newey. The car debuted at the 1986 San Marino Grand Prix and was driven by 1980 World Drivers' Champion Alan Jones from Australia, and his new teammate Patrick Tambay of France.

Like its predecessor, the car was called a Lola but its only connection to the famous Lola Cars was because of car owner Carl Haas' close association with Lola founder Eric Broadley, who was also named as chief engineer for the team in 1985.

== Engine and handling ==
The car was an evolution of the Lola THL1 which used the Hart 415T Straight 4 turbo. When the THL2 made its Grand Prix debut at Imola, it was powered by the new Keith Duckworth designed, Cosworth GBA, a turbocharged, 120° V6 engine badged and marketed as a Ford-TEC; the turbo engine was rated at about 900 bhp (671 kW; 912 PS). Although it was an improvement in power over the unreliable 750 bhp (559 kW; 760 PS) Hart engine (which was punching above its weight just to be in Formula One), the rushed and limited development of the V6 engine meant that Ford unfortunately lagged behind other engines in F1 in 1986 such as the reported 1,300 bhp (969 kW; 1,318 PS) bhp that the Lotus Renault V6 turbo had and the 1,400 bhp (1,044 kW; 1,419 PS) of the turbocharged 4-cylinder BMW engine. Continued development and testing meant that the engine started to become more competitive for the following season in 1987, but by the time this engine had made its debut in 1986, it was only a year between when Duckworth and Geoff Goddard started designing the engine to its first race; this is a very short time for a Formula One racing engine to be produced. They were some four months behind after some initial tests to turbocharge Goddard's old 4-cylinder BDA engine used in sportscars and lower formulae proved to be a failure (Duckworth had wanted to use the 4-cylinder as he believed they were more economical and compact than a V6. Goddard as Cosworth's Chief Engine Designer was not totally on board with that idea, but still let Duckworth pursue it); and it was only towards the end of 1984 where funding was agreed to design the whole new V6.

This led to a frustrating season for both Jones and Tambay as the THL2 was generally regarded to be one of the best handling car of the season. Jones and Tambay were reported to have continually asked Duckworth to build special qualifying engines with more power like Renault, BMW, Honda and Ferrari were doing in order to be able to qualify the car further up the grid, but the requests were turned down. Duckworth, Ford and Cosworth all believed that their proven reliability record would hold them in good stead against their sometimes fragile opposition.

During qualifying for the Italian Grand Prix at the fast Monza Circuit, Alan Jones claimed to have had a heated discussion with engine designer Keith Duckworth about the need for qualifying engines. Jones claimed he was able to point out the "block of flats" rear wings run by Benetton (BMW), Williams (Honda), Arrows (BMW) and Ferrari, yet the slowest of them, the Ferrari F1/86 of Michele Alboreto, was still around 20 km/h (12 mph) faster in a straight line than the Lola's which were running the bare minimum wing settings for speed on the straights while still having some grip in the turns. With the lack of straight line speed, the closest time either driver could post to Teo Fabi's pole winning BMW powered Benetton B186 was Tambay who was 3.73 seconds slower. So down on power throughout the rev range were the Lola Fords that they were actually slower in ultimate top speed (198 mph (319 km/h)) at Monza than the similarly underpowered 4-cylinder Zakspeeds with their own engines were at the start/finish line located about 400 metres back from the speed trap. Despite this, Duckworth, Ford and Cosworth still refused to budge on qualifying engines.

One feature of the THL2 that Jones was not overly fond of was the turbo boost controls. Two knobs protruding from either side of the dashboard controlled the boost pressure for the left and right turbos. Jones' complaint was that he and Tambay had to take their hands off the wheel to adjust the turbos compared to Williams and McLaren whose cars had their boost controls on the steering wheel where it could be easily reached by the drivers' thumbs.

== Racing history ==
In his original Formula One career from 1975 to 1981, Jones had taken 12 wins and was also the 1980 World Drivers' Champion. He had originally retired at the end of the 1981 season, but despite doing some domestic racing in Australia in 1982, found he could not get F1 out of his system (which initially came with testing the Williams FW08 in mid-1982 at the request of Frank Williams) and had been looking to make a comeback since 1983. Indeed, he had raced at Long Beach and the 1983 Race of Champions with Arrows, but the money required to make a full time come back never came through. He signed with Haas in early 1985 and was with the team from their debut at the 1985 Italian Grand Prix. Tambay joined Haas after two seasons driving for the factory Renault team (1984 and 1985), that followed one and a half seasons with Ferrari before that. Tambay had two Grand Prix wins to his credit, both for Ferrari in 1982 and 1983.

Both drivers had previously raced for Carl Haas in the Canadian/American based Can-Am series. Tambay won the 1977 championship for Haas before returning to Europe, while Jones joined Hass in 1978 and won the championship that year also while competing in Formula One for Williams.

Jones only scored four points during 1986 and retired from F1 for good at season's end. Tambay only scored two points with fifth place in Austria which was the teams best performance as Jones finished fourth. This was a surprise due to the Österreichring being a circuit that favoured outright power which the Ford units lacked. But the fast nature of the circuit also saw reliability problems for a number of the usual front runners, allowing the underpowered Lola Fords to finish in the points. Indeed, Jones had a slipping clutch for most of the race which resulted in less wheelspin than normal and he was the only one of the top finishers not to stop for tyres, though he was two laps down on the McLaren TAG-Porsche of reigning World Champion Alain Prost. Tambay also departed F1 at season's end, as did the Lola Haas team following the withdrawal of their major sponsor Beatrice Foods. Beatrice had actually pulled their sponsorship in mid-season due to a change in company management, but the Formula One team carried on until the end of the season.

The THL2s best qualifying position was sixth by Tambay at the Hungaroring for the 1986 Hungarian Grand Prix where the tight nature of the circuit meant a good handling car was more important than outright power.

== Complete Formula One results ==
(key)

| Year | Entrant | Engine | Driver | Tyres | 1 | 2 | 3 | 4 | 5 | 6 | 7 | 8 | 9 | 10 | 11 | 12 | 13 | 14 | 15 | 16 | WCC | Pts. |
|---|---|---|---|---|---|---|---|---|---|---|---|---|---|---|---|---|---|---|---|---|---|---|
| 1986 | Team Haas (USA) Ltd. | Ford TEC; V6 tc | G | | BRA | ESP | SMR | MON | BEL | CAN | DET | FRA | GBR | GER | HUN | AUT | ITA | POR | MEX | AUS | 8th | 6 |
| 1986 | Team Haas (USA) Ltd. | Ford TEC; V6 tc | G | Alan Jones | | | Ret | Ret | 11 | 10 | Ret | Ret | Ret | 9 | Ret | 4 | 6 | Ret | Ret | Ret | 8th | 6 |
| 1986 | Team Haas (USA) Ltd. | Ford TEC; V6 tc | G | Patrick Tambay | | | | Ret | Ret | DNS | | Ret | Ret | 8 | 7 | 5 | Ret | NC | Ret | NC | 8th | 6 |
| 1986 | Team Haas (USA) Ltd. | Ford TEC; V6 tc | G | Eddie Cheever | | | | | | | Ret | | | | | | | | | | 8th | 6 |
