= Keith Duckworth =

British mechanical engineer (1933–2005)

- Born: David Keith Duckworth; 10 August 1933; Blackburn, United Kingdom
- Died: 18 December 2005 (aged 72); Northampton, United Kingdom
- Occupation: Engineer
- Known for: Designing the Cosworth DFV engine

David Keith Duckworth (10 August 1933 – 18 December 2005) was an English mechanical engineer. He is most famous for designing the Cosworth DFV (Double Four Valve) engine, an engine that revolutionised the sport of Formula One.

== Early life and education ==
Duckworth was born in Blackburn, Lancashire, and was educated at Giggleswick School.

Duckworth served his two years of national service with the Royal Air Force, during which time he briefly trained to become a pilot but was grounded for dangerous and incompetent flying and was reclassified as a navigator. Duckworth claimed that allergy to medication he was receiving caused his flying problem - in civilian life he became a keen light aircraft and helicopter pilot.

After completing his tour of duty, which he finished as a navigator, Duckworth studied engineering at Imperial College London, earning a BSc degree in 1955.

== Early career ==
After university he began working for Lotus as a gearbox engineer. Given the task of fixing the 'Queerbox's' unreliability problems, he fell out with Chapman who would not support the cost of the fix that Duckworth felt was needed.

== Cosworth ==
=== DFV ===
After only three years with Lotus, Duckworth, along with fellow Lotus employee Mike Costin, founded Cosworth, a racing engine design and development firm, in 1958. Costin was obliged to remain with Lotus, having recently signed a restrictive contract; for the first few years Duckworth worked essentially alone at Cosworth until Mike could join him. From the start the company was closely associated with the Ford Motor Company and Lotus, and the two companies found early success in the newly formed Formula Junior in the early 1960s. Not only did these successes finance Cosworth's move from Friern Barnet to Edmonton, then to Northampton but they inspired Lotus founder Colin Chapman to persuade Ford to finance the production of Duckworth's DFV (double four valve) engine.

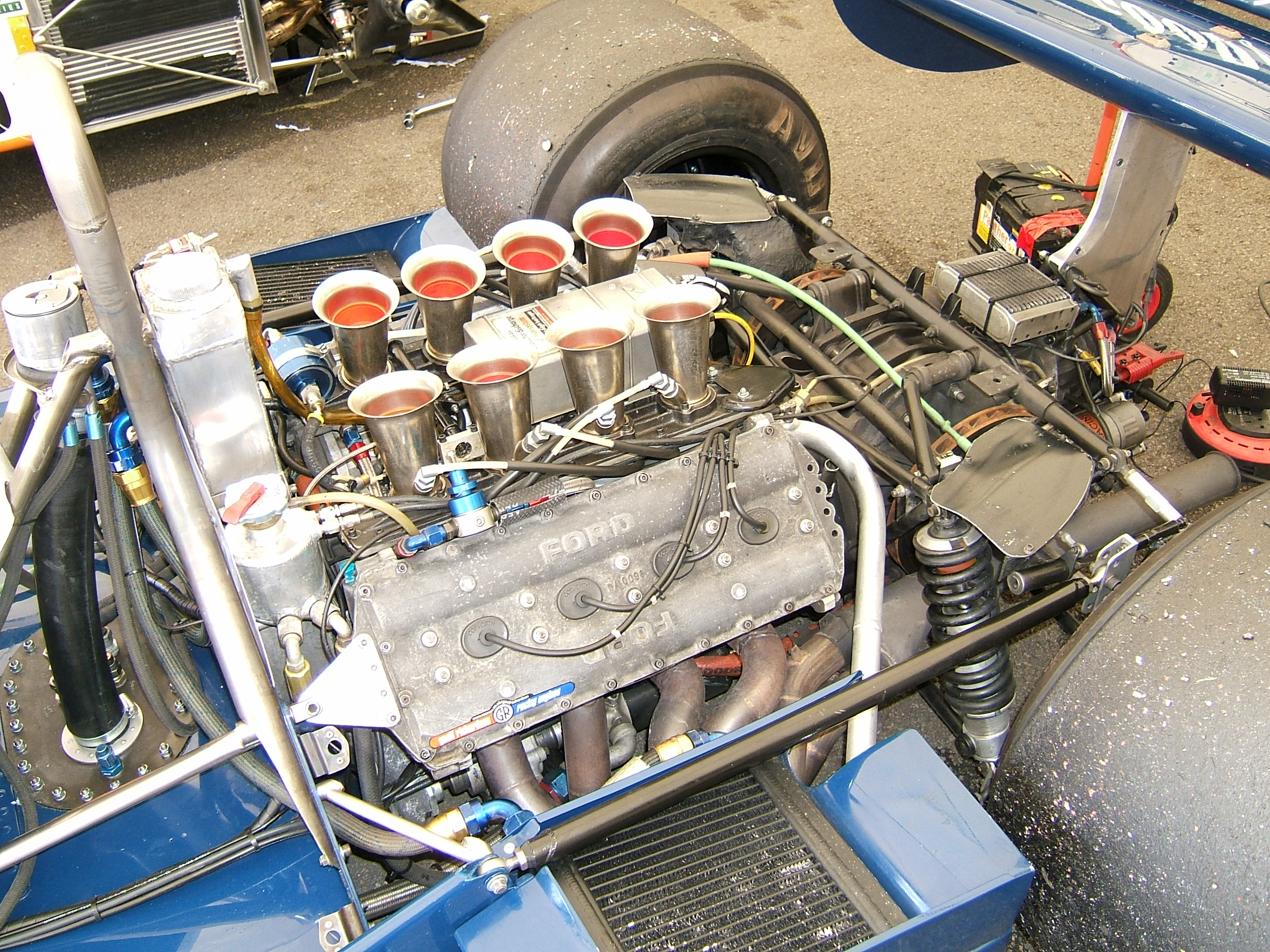
The classic DFV engine - Hewland gearbox combination, mounted in the rear of a 1978 Tyrrell 008.

Chapman's idea was to reduce weight by using the engine as a stressed part of the chassis, bolted straight on to the front monocoque tub, removing the need for a spaceframe around the engine and making it easier for mechanics to maintain the cars. This arrangement has been standard in F1 ever since.

The DFV made a famous debut in the third race of the 1967 season, in the Dutch Grand Prix at Zandvoort. In the back of the Lotus 49, it proved lightning-quick straight out of the box, with Graham Hill taking pole position and Jim Clark taking the win. Teething problems prevented Clark mounting a serious title challenge but the Lotus-Ford was undoubtedly the class of the field. In 1968 the DFV was made available to all teams, and with its enviable power (about 400 bhp (298 kW; 406 PS)) and relatively low price the DFV quickly began to fill up the grid. This spawned a plethora of small, mainly English-based low-budget teams throughout the 1970s, with the DFV last racing in a Tyrrell in 1985. The DFV's last race was the Austrian Grand Prix, held on the fast Österreichring circuit, where driver Martin Brundle failed to qualify the underpowered car. By 1985 the DFV, now upgraded as the DFY, was rated at around 540 bhp (403 kW; 547 PS), though it was up against 950 bhp (708 kW; 963 PS) turbocharged cars and had generally become uncompetitive.

The DFV's last win was at the 1983 Detroit Grand Prix with Italian driver Michele Alboreto piloting his Tyrrell 011 to a surprise, but popular victory. The final podium finish by a DFV powered car came a year later in Detroit when Brundle drove his Tyrrell 012 to second place (Tyrrell were later disqualified from the 1984 season for technical infringements).

=== V6 Turbo ===
It was at the 1984 British Grand Prix at Brands Hatch that Duckworth and Ford finally agreed to build a turbo powered engine to replace the DFV. Initially an old Straight-4 sportscar engine was tested, but it proved to be very unreliable and unable to produce the necessary power required to be competitive in Formula One. Duckworth had wanted to use the 4 cyl engine as he believed it to be more compact and had better fuel economy than a V6 engine, though project manager Mike Baldwin and chief engine designer Geoff Goddard had both been against that idea from the start, feeling that the engine’s design was unsuitable for it to be turbocharged. After six of the 4 cyl engines had been destroyed during a brief 3 week development period, and finding that with a turbo increasing power the engine had formed an incurable vibration at the crankshaft, eventually it was decided that an all-new V6 engine would be built, developed and tested throughout 1985. The new 850 bhp (634 kW; 862 PS), 120° Ford-Cosworth TEC V6 turbo engine (internally dubbed the GBA), made its debut at the 1986 San Marino Grand Prix in the Team Haas (USA) Ltd entered Lola THL2, the car driven by 1980 World Champion Alan Jones. Its development was rushed, and while the engine proved somewhat reliable and smooth for a turbo engine, it was well down on power compared to the other turbo charged engines used in 1986 such as the Honda, BMW, Renault and TAG-Porsche engines, which were reportedly producing in excess of 1,000 bhp (746 kW; 1,014 PS). As a result, neither Haas Lola drivers Jones or Patrick Tambay were able to exploit the good Lola chassis, scoring only 8 points for the season, with a best finish of 4th for Jones at the Austrian Grand Prix (Tambay finished the race in 5th, the race also seeing the first points scored for the new engine).

With further development, the GBA V6 was more successful in 1987, its final year of competition. With the Haas team leaving Formula One, the engine would be supplied exclusively to the Benetton team (who had used the BMW engine with success in 1986). The restriction of turbo boost to just 4.0 Bar in 1987 helped the Ford engine to be more competitive, although some unreliability had crept in with 9 engine or turbo related retirements during the season. Drivers Thierry Boutsen and Teo Fabi were able to claim one podium finish each during the season, at Austria (Fabi) and Australia (Boutsen), while Boutsen led his first Grand Prix when he briefly led the Mexican Grand Prix.

With turbo engines to be banned by the FIA from 1989, Ford-Cosworth abandoned the V6 turbo at the end of 1987 and once again concentrated on their new 3.5 litre naturally aspirated DFZ V8 that had been raced through 1987 by teams such as Tyrrell and the new French Larrousse outfit. The DFZ was a development of the original DFV, while Benetton would have exclusive use of its successor, the DFR in 1988.

=== Other Cosworth engines ===
The Cosworth DFV, and other engines based on the same design, became the standard in Formula One and many other types of racing and made Duckworth a very wealthy man. In 1980 he sold his majority stake in Cosworth for tax reasons but retained his position as chairman of the company; relinquishing the job to Mike Costin seven years later for health reasons. He was appointed 'President' of the company on his retirement, and remained interested in engines and engineering until his death.

Keith's son Roger joined his father's company and worked as a development engineer in the Road Engines division being a key part of the team that delivered the YB family of engines for the Ford Sierra RS Cosworth and Ford Escort RS Cosworth vehicles. Roger left Cosworth in 1998 and founded Integral Powertrain Ltd with three of his Cosworth colleagues.

== Death ==
Duckworth died in Northampton on 19 December 2005.
