= 1986 Austrian Grand Prix =

- Race 12 of 16 in the 1986 Formula One World Championship
- The Österreichring (last modified in 1977)

Race details
- Date: 17 August 1986
- Official name: XXIV Großer Preis von Osterreich
- Location: Österreichring; Spielberg, Styria, Austria
- Course: Permanent racing facility
- Course length: 5.942 km (3.692 miles)
- Distance: 52 laps, 308.984 km (191.984 miles)
- Weather: Dry

Pole position
Driver	(Italy) Teo Fabi	Benetton-BMW
- Time: 1:23.549

Fastest lap
Driver	(Austria) Gerhard Berger	Benetton-BMW
- Time: 1:29.444 on lap 49

Podium
First	(France) Alain Prost	McLaren-TAG
Second	(Italy) Michele Alboreto	Ferrari
Third	(Sweden) Stefan Johansson	Ferrari

The 1986 Austrian Grand Prix was a Formula One motor race held at Österreichring on 17 August 1986. It was the twelfth race of the 1986 Formula One World Championship.

The 52-lap race was won by Alain Prost, driving a McLaren-TAG, with Ferrari drivers Michele Alboreto and Stefan Johansson second and third respectively. With Drivers' Championship challengers Nigel Mansell, Nelson Piquet and Ayrton Senna all retiring, Prost moved into second place in the Championship, two points behind Mansell.

== Qualifying ==
=== Qualifying report ===
Qualifying saw several surprises as the Benetton-BMWs of Teo Fabi and Gerhard Berger filled the front row, Fabi just under 0.2 seconds ahead, while Riccardo Patrese took fourth in his Brabham despite a crash, just behind Keke Rosberg's McLaren. The four Drivers' Championship challengers occupied fifth to eighth in the order of Alain Prost's McLaren, the two Williams of Nigel Mansell and Nelson Piquet, and Ayrton Senna's Lotus. Completing the top ten were Michele Alboreto's Ferrari and Derek Warwick in the second Brabham.

Pat Symonds would later claim that following Benetton's front-row lockout, the head of BMW Motorsport, Paul Rosche, demanded to inspect the engine control unit chips installed in the team's engines to see if they had been tampered with in breach of contract (Benetton were using customer engines that were the original upright configuration rather than the special, tilted BMWs Brabham were using. Under the terms of their contract the team was not allowed to modify the engines or their ECUs in any way from the factory supplied settings). However, the team had wisely kept their supply of original BMW Motorsport chips for just such an occurrence and were able to provide Rosche with those rather than the modified ones they had actually been using. The modified chips were said to give the Benetton-BMWs an alleged 1,400 bhp (1,044 kW; 1,419 PS), some 50 bhp (37 kW; 51 PS) over the official factory units used by Brabham. In fact, 1986 was the high watermark for power figures in Formula One with the BMW, Honda, Renault, Ferrari and TAG-Porsche turbo's all allegedly pumping out over 1,000 bhp (746 kW; 1,014 PS) in qualifying trim.

Derek Warwick in his lowline Brabham BT55 was the quickest car through the speed trap heading into the high speed Bosch Kurve being recorded during qualifying at 344 km/h (214 mph). The low line Brabhams with their factory BMW turbos were proving to be far more effective on the high speed Österreichring where the Hella-Licht chicane was the only really slow section of the track. Showing the difference in car set up (and it must be said, drivers'), Patrese, running more wing than his team mate was some 1.682 seconds faster around the circuit even though his recorded top speed was 7 km/h (4 mph) slower.

=== Qualifying classification ===
Pos	No	Driver	Constructor	Q1	Q2	Gap
1	19	(Italy) Teo Fabi	Benetton-BMW	1:26.421	1:23.549	
2	20	(Austria) Gerhard Berger	Benetton-BMW	1:25.638	1:23.743	+0.194
3	2	(Finland) Keke Rosberg	McLaren-TAG	1:23.956	1:23.903	+0.354
4	7	(Italy) Riccardo Patrese	Brabham-BMW	1:26.648	1:24.044	+0.495
5	1	(France) Alain Prost	McLaren-TAG	1:24.346	1:25.285	+0.797
6	5	(United Kingdom) Nigel Mansell	Williams-Honda	1:25.515	1:24.635	+1.086
7	6	(Brazil) Nelson Piquet	Williams-Honda	1:25.090	1:24.697	+1.148
8	12	(Brazil) Ayrton Senna	Lotus-Renault	1:26.650	1:25.249	+1.700
9	27	(Italy) Michele Alboreto	Ferrari	1:26.152	1:25.561	+2.012
10	8	(United Kingdom) Derek Warwick	Brabham-BMW	1:26.892	1:25.726	+2.177
11	26	(France) Philippe Alliot	Ligier-Renault	1:26.999	1:25.917	+2.368
12	25	(France) René Arnoux	Ligier-Renault	1:26.797	1:26.312	+2.763
13	16	(France) Patrick Tambay	Lola-Ford	1:27.628	1:26.489	+2.940
14	28	(Sweden) Stefan Johansson	Ferrari	1:27.263	1:26.646	+3.097
15	11	(United Kingdom) Johnny Dumfries	Lotus-Renault	1:27.212	1:27.833	+3.663
16	15	(Australia) Alan Jones	Lola-Ford	1:27.420	1:27.476	+3.871
17	3	(United Kingdom) Martin Brundle	Tyrrell-Renault	1:28.572	1:28.018	+4.469
18	18	(Belgium) Thierry Boutsen	Arrows-BMW	1:29.155	1:28.598	+5.049
19	24	(Italy) Alessandro Nannini	Minardi-Motori Moderni	1:31.974	1:28.645	+5.096
20	4	(France) Philippe Streiff	Tyrrell-Renault	1:31.455	1:28.951	+5.402
21	14	(United Kingdom) Jonathan Palmer	Zakspeed	1:29.073	1:29.583	+5.524
22	17	(West Germany) Christian Danner	Arrows-BMW	1:29.430	1:40.236	+5.881
23	23	(Italy) Andrea de Cesaris	Minardi-Motori Moderni	1:33.263	1:29.615	+6.066
24	29	(Netherlands) Huub Rothengatter	Zakspeed	2:21.202	1:32.512	+8.963
25	21	(Italy) Piercarlo Ghinzani	Osella-Alfa Romeo	1:35.070	1:33.988	+10.439
26	22	(Canada) Allen Berg	Osella-Alfa Romeo	1:38.731	1:36.150	+12.601

== Race ==
=== Race report ===
Warwick was a non-starter in bizarre circumstances. After the Englishman's car was repaired following a gearbox failure in the morning warm-up, the two Brabhams went to the grid, Patrese in the spare car following his qualifying crash. Then, as Patrese took his place on the grid, his own gearbox broke. As the Italian driver was six places ahead of Warwick, the decision was made on the grid to hand him Warwick's car for the rest of the race. Warwick later admitted that team owner Bernie Ecclestone had to physically drag him from the car as he refused to hand it over.

When the race got underway, local driver Berger took the lead from Fabi, while Rosberg and Patrese made slow starts and were overtaken by Prost, Mansell and Piquet. Patrese retired after two laps with an engine failure, while the same fate befell Senna after 13 laps. On lap 17, Fabi overtook Berger at the Bosch-Kurve, only for his own engine to fail seconds later. Mansell moved into second place when Prost made a pit stop for tyres, then the lead shortly afterwards when Berger pitted with a battery problem. Prost took the lead when Mansell made his own pit stop, before both Williams retired within three laps of each other, Piquet with an overheating engine and Mansell with a broken driveshaft. This left Prost around half a minute clear of team-mate Rosberg, with Alboreto up to third. Five laps from the end, Rosberg suffered an electrical failure, leaving Prost to win by a full lap from Alboreto with a further lap back to the second Ferrari of Stefan Johansson in third; the top six was completed by the two Haas Lolas of Alan Jones and Patrick Tambay and the Arrows of Christian Danner. Berger, having lost four laps as a result of his battery problem, made a charge to finish close behind Danner, setting the fastest lap of the race in the process.

Alan Jones was actually aided by a slipping clutch in his Lola-Ford as it meant much less wheelspin, thus he was able to complete the race (albeit 2 laps down on Prost) without having to stop to change his Goodyears. His 4th place and Tambay's 5th were cause for celebration in the Haas Lola camp as it was their first ever World Championship points and the first for the Cosworth designed and built Ford turbo engine.

With the win, Prost moved from fourth to second in the Drivers' Championship and cut Mansell's lead to two points, 55 to 53, with Senna on 48 and Piquet on 47.

In the post race press conference, Alboreto was asked if the podiums were the start of a Ferrari revival, though he was reluctant to agree, instead pointing out that it was more through on the day reliability over most of their faster rivals than any great leap forward in speed by the F1/86.

=== Race classification ===
Pos	No	Driver	Constructor	Laps	Time/Retired	Grid	Points
1	1	(France) Alain Prost	McLaren-TAG	52	1:21:22.531	5	9
2	27	(Italy) Michele Alboreto	Ferrari	51	+ 1 Lap	9	6
3	28	(Sweden) Stefan Johansson	Ferrari	50	+ 2 Laps	14	4
4	15	(Australia) Alan Jones	Lola-Ford	50	+ 2 Laps	16	3
5	16	(France) Patrick Tambay	Lola-Ford	50	+ 2 Laps	13	2
6	17	(Germany) Christian Danner	Arrows-BMW	49	+ 3 Laps	22	1
7	20	(Austria) Gerhard Berger	Benetton-BMW	49	+ 3 Laps	2	
8	29	(Netherlands) Huub Rothengatter	Zakspeed	48	+ 4 Laps	24	
9	2	(Finland) Keke Rosberg	McLaren-TAG	47	Electrical	3	
10	25	(France) René Arnoux	Ligier-Renault	47	+ 5 Laps	12	
11	21	(Italy) Piercarlo Ghinzani	Osella-Alfa Romeo	46	+ 6 Laps	25	
Ret	5	(United Kingdom) Nigel Mansell	Williams-Honda	32	Halfshaft	6	
Ret	6	(Brazil) Nelson Piquet	Williams-Honda	29	Engine	7	
Ret	18	(Belgium) Thierry Boutsen	Arrows-BMW	25	Turbo	18	
Ret	19	(Italy) Teo Fabi	Benetton-BMW	17	Engine	1	
Ret	26	(France) Philippe Alliot	Ligier-Renault	16	Engine	11	
Ret	24	(Italy) Alessandro Nannini	Minardi-Motori Moderni	13	Suspension	19	
Ret	23	(Italy) Andrea de Cesaris	Minardi-Motori Moderni	13	Clutch	23	
Ret	12	(Brazil) Ayrton Senna	Lotus-Renault	13	Engine	8	
Ret	3	(United Kingdom) Martin Brundle	Tyrrell-Renault	12	Turbo	17	
Ret	4	(France) Philippe Streiff	Tyrrell-Renault	10	Engine	20	
Ret	11	(United Kingdom) Johnny Dumfries	Lotus-Renault	9	Engine	15	
Ret	14	(United Kingdom) Jonathan Palmer	Zakspeed	8	Engine	21	
Ret	22	(Canada) Allen Berg	Osella-Alfa Romeo	6	Electrical	26	
Ret	7	(Italy) Riccardo Patrese	Brabham-BMW	2	Engine	4	
DNS	8	(United Kingdom) Derek Warwick	Brabham-BMW	0	Car raced by Patrese	10	

== Championship standings after the race ==
Drivers' Championship standings

Pos	Driver	Points
1	(United Kingdom) Nigel Mansell	55
2	(France) Alain Prost	53
3	(Brazil) Ayrton Senna	48
4	(Brazil) Nelson Piquet	47
5	(Finland) Keke Rosberg	19

Constructors' Championship standings

Pos	Constructor	Points
1	(United Kingdom) Williams-Honda	102
2	(United Kingdom) McLaren-TAG	72
3	(United Kingdom) Lotus-Renault	50
4	(France) Ligier-Renault	28
5	(Italy) Ferrari	26

- Note: Only the top five positions are included for both sets of standings.

Previous race: 1986 Hungarian Grand Prix	FIA Formula One World Championship; 1986 season	Next race: 1986 Italian Grand Prix
Previous race: 1985 Austrian Grand Prix	Austrian Grand Prix	Next race: 1987 Austrian Grand Prix
