= 1986 San Marino Grand Prix =

- Race 3 of 16 in the 1986 Formula One World Championship
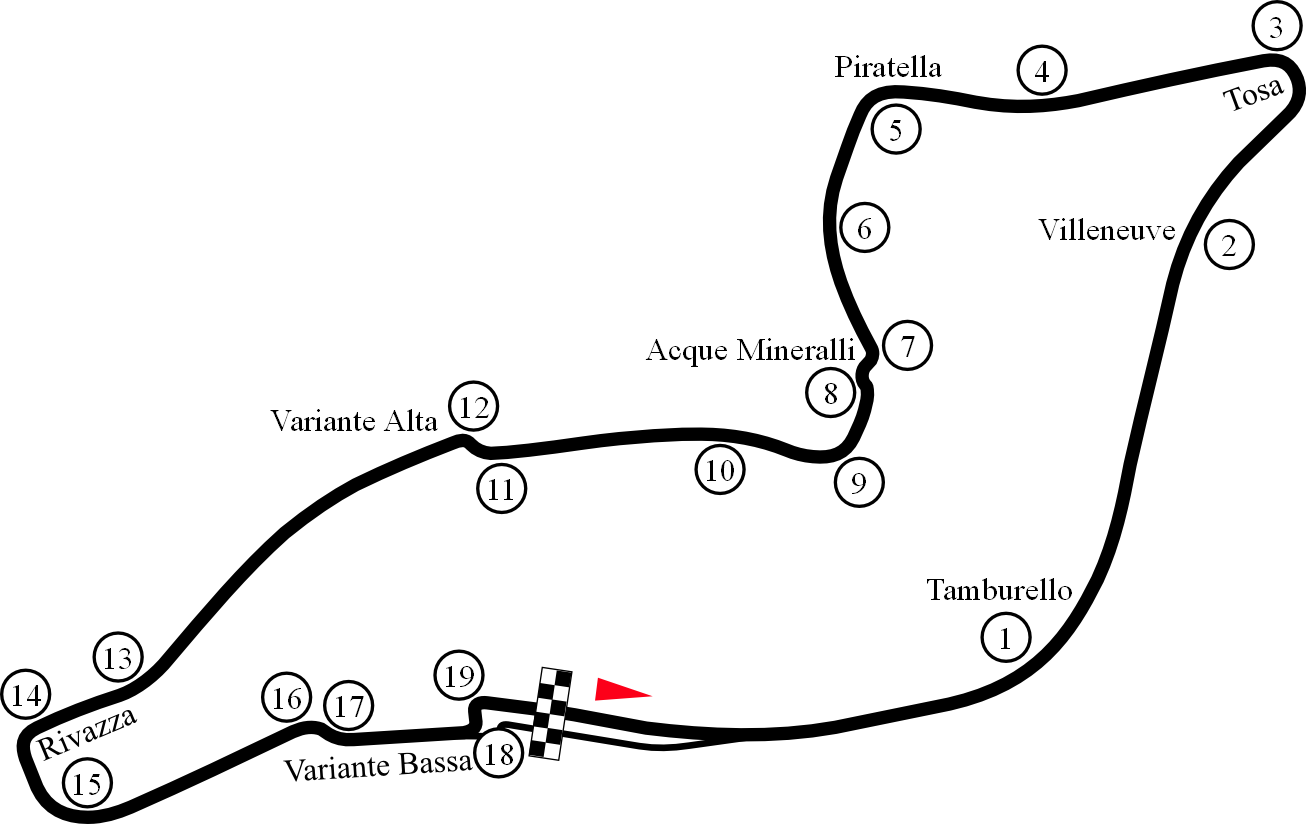

Race details
- Date: April 27, 1986
- Official name: 6º Gran Premio di San Marino
- Location: Autodromo Dino Ferrari, Imola, Emilia-Romagna, Italy
- Course: Permanent racing facility
- Course length: 5.040 km (3.131 miles)
- Distance: 60 laps, 302.4 km (187.86 miles)
- Weather: Overcast, warm

Pole position
Driver	(Brazil) Ayrton Senna	Lotus-Renault
- Time: 1:25.050

Fastest lap
Driver	(Brazil) Nelson Piquet	Williams-Honda
- Time: 1:28.667 on lap 57

Podium
First	(France) Alain Prost	McLaren-TAG
Second	(Brazil) Nelson Piquet	Williams-Honda
Third	(Austria) Gerhard Berger	Benetton-BMW

The 1986 San Marino Grand Prix was a Formula One motor race held at Imola on 27 April 1986. The race was the third round of the year's World Championship. As with the previous year's event, fuel consumption was a big issue, changing the points finishers in the closing laps.

The Autodromo Dino Ferrari had received safety upgrades from the previous year, including slight track modifications after the Variante Alta chicane and extended runoff areas at the Rivazza complex.

Alain Prost (McLaren-TAG) dominated the race after Ayrton Senna (Lotus-Renault) and Nigel Mansell (Williams-Honda) retired early, before almost running out of fuel, three corners from the chequered flag. Frantically weaving the car back and forth to slosh the last drops of fuel into the pickup, he managed to keep it running just long enough to creep over the line and win the race (his McLaren teammate Keke Rosberg was classified 5th despite running dry 2 laps from the finish, a problem attributed to Rosberg using too much boost). Nelson Piquet brought his Williams home in second place only 7.645 seconds behind Prost, while Austrian Gerhard Berger finished third to score his and the Benetton team's first Formula One podium finish.

This race saw the long-awaited debut of Ford's replacement for the old Cosworth DFV in the form of a new 900 bhp (671 kW; 912 PS), turbocharged V6 engine designed by Keith Duckworth who had also designed the DFV. In its debut race in the also new Lola THL2 and driven by 1980 World Champion Alan Jones, the new Cosworth built Ford qualified in 21st place and completed 28 laps in the race before Jones was forced to retire with overheating.

== Classification ==
=== Qualifying ===
Pos	No	Driver	Constructor	Q1	Q2	Gap
1	12	(Brazil) Ayrton Senna	Lotus-Renault	1:25.050	1:25.286	—
2	6	(Brazil) Nelson Piquet	Williams-Honda	1:25.890	1:25.569	+0.519
3	5	(United Kingdom) Nigel Mansell	Williams-Honda	1:26.752	1:26.159	+1.109
4	1	(France) Alain Prost	McLaren-TAG	1:26.273	1:26.176	+1.126
5	27	(Italy) Michele Alboreto	Ferrari	1:26.428	1:26.263	+1.213
6	2	(Finland) Keke Rosberg	McLaren-TAG	1:26.956	1:26.835	+1.785
7	28	(Sweden) Stefan Johansson	Ferrari	1:27.497	1:27.009	+1.959
8	25	(France) René Arnoux	Ligier-Renault	1:28.362	1:27.403	+2.353
9	20	(Austria) Gerhard Berger	Benetton-BMW	1:28.559	1:27.444	+2.394
10	19	(Italy) Teo Fabi	Benetton-BMW	1:29.328	1:27.538	+2.488
11	16	(France) Patrick Tambay	Lola-Hart	1:29.665	1:27.860	+2.810
12	18	(Belgium) Thierry Boutsen	Arrows-BMW	1:29.931	1:28.022	+2.972
13	3	(United Kingdom) Martin Brundle	Tyrrell-Renault	1:29.687	1:28.329	+3.279
14	26	(France) Jacques Laffite	Ligier-Renault	1:28.411	1:28.389	+3.339
15	17	(Switzerland) Marc Surer	Arrows-BMW	1:30.156	1:28.637	+3.587
16	7	(Italy) Riccardo Patrese	Brabham-BMW	1:30.641	1:28.828	+3.778
17	11	(United Kingdom) Johnny Dumfries	Lotus-Renault	1:29.244	1:26.607	+4.194
18	24	(Italy) Alessandro Nannini	Minardi-Motori Moderni	1:29.985	1:29.244	+4.194
19	8	(Italy) Elio de Angelis	Brabham-BMW	1:30.881	1:29.713	+4.663
20	14	(United Kingdom) Jonathan Palmer	Zakspeed	1:33.352	1:30.024	+4.974
21	15	(Australia) Alan Jones	Lola-Ford	1:30.087	1:30.517	+5.037
22	4	(France) Philippe Streiff	Tyrrell-Renault	1:30.123	1:32.358	+5.073
23	23	(Italy) Andrea de Cesaris	Minardi-Motori Moderni	1:31.956	1:30.131	+5.081
24	29	(Netherlands) Huub Rothengatter	Zakspeed	1:40.903	1:31.953	+6.903
25	22	(West Germany) Christian Danner	Osella-Alfa Romeo	1:37.485	1:33.806	+8.756
26	21	(Italy) Piercarlo Ghinzani	Osella-Alfa Romeo	1:34.461		+9.411

=== Race ===
Pos	No	Driver	Constructor	Laps	Time/Retired	Grid	Points
1	1	(France) Alain Prost	McLaren-TAG	60	1:32:28.408	4	9
2	6	(Brazil) Nelson Piquet	Williams-Honda	60	+ 7.645	2	6
3	20	(Austria) Gerhard Berger	Benetton-BMW	59	+ 1 Lap	9	4
4	28	(Sweden) Stefan Johansson	Ferrari	59	+ 1 Lap	7	3
5	2	(Finland) Keke Rosberg	McLaren-TAG	58	Out of Fuel	6	2
6	7	(Italy) Riccardo Patrese	Brabham-BMW	58	Out of Fuel	16	1
7	18	(Belgium) Thierry Boutsen	Arrows-BMW	58	+ 2 Laps	12	
8	3	(United Kingdom) Martin Brundle	Tyrrell-Renault	58	+ 2 Laps	13	
9	17	(Switzerland) Marc Surer	Arrows-BMW	57	+ 3 Laps	15	
10	27	(Italy) Michele Alboreto	Ferrari	56	Turbo	5	
Ret	21	(Italy) Piercarlo Ghinzani	Osella-Alfa Romeo	52	Out of Fuel	26	
Ret	25	(France) René Arnoux	Ligier-Renault	46	Wheel	8	
Ret	4	(France) Philippe Streiff	Tyrrell-Renault	41	Transmission	22	
Ret	19	(Italy) Teo Fabi	Benetton-BMW	39	Engine	10	
Ret	14	(United Kingdom) Jonathan Palmer	Zakspeed	38	Brakes	20	
Ret	22	(West Germany) Christian Danner	Osella-Alfa Romeo	31	Electrical	25	
Ret	15	(Australia) Alan Jones	Lola-Ford	28	Overheating	21	
Ret	23	(Italy) Andrea de Cesaris	Minardi-Motori Moderni	20	Engine	23	
Ret	8	(Italy) Elio de Angelis	Brabham-BMW	19	Engine	19	
Ret	26	(France) Jacques Laffite	Ligier-Renault	14	Transmission	14	
Ret	12	(Brazil) Ayrton Senna	Lotus-Renault	11	Wheel Bearing	1	
Ret	5	(United Kingdom) Nigel Mansell	Williams-Honda	8	Engine	3	
Ret	11	(United Kingdom) Johnny Dumfries	Lotus-Renault	8	Wheel Bearing	17	
Ret	29	(Netherlands) Huub Rothengatter	Zakspeed	7	Turbo	24	
Ret	16	(France) Patrick Tambay	Lola-Hart	5	Engine	11	
Ret	24	(Italy) Alessandro Nannini	Minardi-Motori Moderni	0	Accident	18	

== Championship standings after the race ==
Drivers' Championship standings

Pos	Driver	Points
1	(Brazil) Ayrton Senna	15
1	(Brazil) Nelson Piquet	15
3	(France) Alain Prost	13
4	(United Kingdom) Nigel Mansell	6
5	(Austria) Gerhard Berger	6

Constructors' Championship standings

Pos	Constructor	Points
1	(United Kingdom) Williams-Honda	21
2	(United Kingdom) McLaren-TAG	18
3	(United Kingdom) Lotus-Renault	15
4	(United Kingdom) Benetton-BMW	8
5	(France) Ligier-Renault	7

- Note: Only the top five positions are included for both sets of standings.

Previous race: 1986 Spanish Grand Prix	FIA Formula One World Championship; 1986 season	Next race: 1986 Monaco Grand Prix
Previous race: 1985 San Marino Grand Prix	San Marino Grand Prix	Next race: 1987 San Marino Grand Prix
