= 1986 Monaco Grand Prix =

Coordinates: 43°44′4.74″N 7°25′16.8″E

- Race 4 of 16 in the 1986 Formula One World Championship
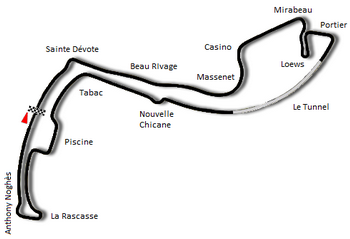

Race details
- Date: 11 May 1986
- Official name: XLIV Grand Prix Automobile de Monaco
- Location: Circuit de Monaco, Monte Carlo
- Course: Street circuit
- Course length: 3.328 km (2.068 miles)
- Distance: 78 laps, 259.584 km (161.298 miles)
- Weather: Sunny, mild, dry

Pole position
Driver	(France) Alain Prost	McLaren-TAG
- Time: 1:22.627

Fastest lap
Driver	(France) Alain Prost	McLaren-TAG
- Time: 1:26.607 on lap 51

Podium
First	(France) Alain Prost	McLaren-TAG
Second	(Finland) Keke Rosberg	McLaren-TAG
Third	(Brazil) Ayrton Senna	Lotus-Renault

The 1986 Monaco Grand Prix was a Formula One motor race held at Monaco on 11 May 1986. It was the fourth race of the 1986 Formula One World Championship. The Monaco circuit had been modified from the year before: the chicane after the tunnel now had three turns and was renamed the Nouvelle Chicane. The end result was that the chicane was slowed considerably from the old left-right flick it was previously, plus it added 16 metres to the circuit length.

Patrick Tambay had an accident in which he and Martin Brundle tangled at Mirabeau, and Tambay's Lola-Ford went right over Brundle's Tyrrell-Renault, caught six feet of air and barrel-rolled into the protective Armco right next to some spectators, and in the process almost went over the Armco into a bar next to the track. The Lola landed upright, and Tambay was able to walk away from the accident unscathed.

The 78-lap race was won from pole position by Frenchman Alain Prost, driving a McLaren-TAG. This was Prost's third consecutive Monaco win. His Finnish teammate Keke Rosberg finished second, with Brazilian Ayrton Senna third in a Lotus-Renault.

This was also the last Grand Prix for Italian Elio de Angelis, before his fatal testing accident at Paul Ricard three days later.

This was the last Monaco Grand Prix where only 20 cars would be allowed to start. From the 1987 race the available grid size would be the same 26 cars as every other race.

== Classification ==
=== Qualifying ===
Pos	No	Driver	Constructor	Q1	Q2	Gap
1	1	(France) Alain Prost	McLaren-TAG	1:26.059	1:22.627	
2	5	(United Kingdom) Nigel Mansell	Williams-Honda	1:30.919	1:23.047	+0.420
3	12	(Brazil) Ayrton Senna	Lotus-Renault	1:25.222	1:23.175	+0.548
4	27	(Italy) Michele Alboreto	Ferrari	1:26.839	1:23.904	+1.277
5	20	(Austria) Gerhard Berger	Benetton-BMW	1:26.280	1:23.960	+1.333
6	7	(Italy) Riccardo Patrese	Brabham-BMW	1:26.872	1:24.102	+1.475
7	26	(France) Jacques Laffite	Ligier-Renault	1:26.702	1:24.402	+1.775
8	16	(France) Patrick Tambay	Lola-Ford	1:27.038	1:24.686	+2.059
9	2	(Finland) Keke Rosberg	McLaren-TAG	1:25.662	1:24.701	+2.074
10	3	(United Kingdom) Martin Brundle	Tyrrell-Renault	1:28.564	1:24.860	+2.233
11	6	(Brazil) Nelson Piquet	Williams-Honda	1:27.919	1:25.287	+2.660
12	25	(France) René Arnoux	Ligier-Renault	1:25.900	1:25.538	+2.911
13	4	(France) Philippe Streiff	Tyrrell-Renault	1:32.646	1:25.720	+3.093
14	18	(Belgium) Thierry Boutsen	Arrows-BMW	1:29.244	1:25.832	+3.205
15	28	(Sweden) Stefan Johansson	Ferrari	1:27.005	1:25.907	+3.280
16	19	(Italy) Teo Fabi	Benetton-BMW	1:29.397	1:25.926	+3.299
17	17	(Switzerland) Marc Surer	Arrows-BMW	1:28.878	1:26.300	+3.673
18	15	(Australia) Alan Jones	Lola-Ford	1:26.663	1:26.456	+3.829
19	14	(United Kingdom) Jonathan Palmer	Zakspeed	1:30.152	1:26.644	+4.017
20	8	(Italy) Elio de Angelis	Brabham-BMW	1:27.191	1:28.191	+4.564
DNQ	21	(Italy) Piercarlo Ghinzani	Osella-Alfa Romeo	1:29.282	1:27.288	+4.661
DNQ	11	(United Kingdom) Johnny Dumfries	Lotus-Renault	1:35.027	1:27.826	+5.199
DNQ	29	(Netherlands) Huub Rothengatter	Zakspeed	1:36.814	1:28.060	+5.433
DNQ	22	(West Germany) Christian Danner	Osella-Alfa Romeo	1:30.986	1:28.132	+5.505
DNQ	23	(Italy) Andrea de Cesaris	Minardi-Motori Moderni	1:28.962	2:22.479	+6.335
DNQ	24	(Italy) Alessandro Nannini	Minardi-Motori Moderni	1:29.447	2:27.098	+6.820

=== Race ===
Pos	No	Driver	Constructor	Tyre	Laps	Time/Retired	Grid	Points
1	1	(France) Alain Prost	McLaren-TAG	G	78	1:55:41.060	1	9
2	2	(Finland) Keke Rosberg	McLaren-TAG	G	78	+25.022	9	6
3	12	(Brazil) Ayrton Senna	Lotus-Renault	G	78	+53.646	3	4
4	5	(United Kingdom) Nigel Mansell	Williams-Honda	G	78	+1:11.402	2	3
5	25	(France) René Arnoux	Ligier-Renault	P	77	+1 lap	12	2
6	26	(France) Jacques Laffite	Ligier-Renault	P	77	+1 lap	7	1
7	6	(Brazil) Nelson Piquet	Williams-Honda	G	77	+1 lap	11	
8	18	(Belgium) Thierry Boutsen	Arrows-BMW	G	75	+3 laps	14	
9	17	(Switzerland) Marc Surer	Arrows-BMW	G	75	+3 laps	17	
10	28	(Sweden) Stefan Johansson	Ferrari	G	75	+3 laps	15	
11	4	(France) Philippe Streiff	Tyrrell-Renault	G	74	+4 laps	13	
12	14	(United Kingdom) Jonathan Palmer	Zakspeed	G	74	+4 laps	19	
Ret	3	(United Kingdom) Martin Brundle	Tyrrell-Renault	G	67	Collision	10	
Ret	16	(France) Patrick Tambay	Lola-Ford	G	67	Collision	8	
Ret	20	(Austria) Gerhard Berger	Benetton-BMW	P	42	Steering	5	
Ret	7	(Italy) Riccardo Patrese	Brabham-BMW	P	38	Fuel pump	6	
Ret	27	(Italy) Michele Alboreto	Ferrari	G	38	Turbo	4	
Ret	8	(Italy) Elio de Angelis	Brabham-BMW	P	31	Engine	20	
Ret	19	(Italy) Teo Fabi	Benetton-BMW	P	17	Brakes	16	
Ret	15	(Australia) Alan Jones	Lola-Ford	G	2	Accident	18	

== Championship standings after the race ==
Drivers' Championship standings

Pos	Driver	Points
1	(France) Alain Prost	22
2	(Brazil) Ayrton Senna	19
3	(Brazil) Nelson Piquet	15
4	(Finland) Keke Rosberg	11
5	(United Kingdom) Nigel Mansell	9

Constructors' Championship standings

Pos	Constructor	Points
1	(United Kingdom) McLaren-TAG	33
2	(United Kingdom) Williams-Honda	24
3	(United Kingdom) Lotus-Renault	19
4	(France) Ligier-Renault	10
5	(United Kingdom) Benetton-BMW	8

- Note: Only the top five positions are included for both sets of standings.

Previous race: 1986 San Marino Grand Prix	FIA Formula One World Championship; 1986 season	Next race: 1986 Belgian Grand Prix
Previous race: 1985 Monaco Grand Prix	Monaco Grand Prix	Next race: 1987 Monaco Grand Prix
