= 1979 Mediterranean Grand Prix =

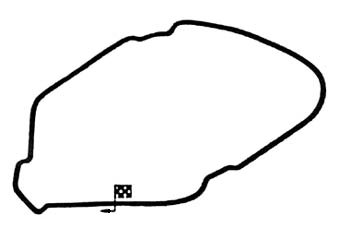

Race details
- Date: 29 July 1979
- Official name: 18th Gran Premio del Mediterraneo
- Location: Pergusa, Sicily, Italy
- Course: Autodromo di Pergusa
- Course length: 4.950 km (3.076 miles)
- Distance: 45 laps, 222.750 km (138.420 miles)

Pole position
Driver	(United Kingdom) Brian Henton	Ralt-Hart
- Time: 1:31.45

Fastest lap
Driver	(United Kingdom) Stephen South	March-BMW
- Time: 1:33.20

Podium
First	(Sweden) Eje Elgh	March-BMW
Second	(Republic of Ireland) Derek Daly	March-BMW
Third	(United Kingdom) Stephen South	March-BMW

The 18th Gran Premio del Mediterraneo (Grand Prix of the Mediterranean), was the Round Ten of the 1979 European Championship for F2 Drivers. This was held on the Isle of Sicily, at the Autodromo di Pergusa, Enna, on 29 July.

== Report ==
=== Entry ===
A total of 25 F2 cars were entered for the event, however just 22 took part in qualifying.

=== Qualifying ===
Brian Henton took pole position for the Toleman Group Motorsport, in their Ralt-Hart RT2, averaging a speed of 121.15 mph.

=== Race ===
The race was held over 45 laps of the Enna-Pergusa circuit. After a furious battle, Henton took the chequered flag, ahead of Eje Elgh. However, Elgh's team, Marlboro Team Tiga successfully appealed against Henton using an escape road on the first lap to avoid an accident. Despite being delayed by the first corner incident, Derek Daly followed Elgh home, with his teammate Stephen South next home. Elgh won in a time of 1hr 11:02.09mins., averaging a speed of 117.564 mph.

== Classification ==
=== Race result ===
Pos.	No.	Driver	Entrant	Car - Engine	Time, Laps	Reason Out
1	22	(Sweden) Eje Elgh	Marlboro Team Tiga	March-BMW 792	1hr 11:02.09	
2	7	(Republic of Ireland) Derek Daly	Project Four Racing – ICI Racing Team	March-BMW 792	1hr 11:18.8	
3	8	(United Kingdom) Stephen South	Project Four Racing – ICI Racing Team	March-BMW 792	1hr 11:23.2	
4	4	(Italy) Teo Fabi	March Racing Ltd	March-BMW 792	1hr 11:38.6	
5	9	(United States) Eddie Cheever	Osella Squadra Corse SH	Osella-BMW FA2/79	1hr 11:56.2	
6	15	(South Africa) Rad Dougall	Toleman Group Motorsport	Ralt-Hart RT2	1hr 12:04.7	
7	18	(Italy) Gianfranco Brancatelli	Racing Team Everest	March-BMW 792	1hr 12:07.3	
8	23	(Netherlands) Huub Rothengatter	Docking Spitzley Racing / Racing Team Holland	Chevron-Hart B48	1hr 12:07.9	
9	3	(Italy) Beppe Gabbiani	Polifac BMW Junior Team	March-BMW 792	1hr 12:32.2	
10	5	(Argentina) Juan Traverso	March Racing Team (Bob Salisbury Racing)	March-Hart 792	44	
11	12	(Argentina) Ariel Bakst	Sanremo Racing Srl	March-BMW 792	44	
DNF	43	(Italy) Oscar Pedersoli	Sanremo Racing Srl	March-BMW 792	22	Suspension
DNF	77	(United Kingdom) Derek Warwick	Team BP with Theodore Racing	March-Hart 792	18	Accident
DNF	6	(United States) Bobby Rahal	Ampex Chevron Racing Team	Chevron-Hart B48	16	Puncture
DNF	19	(Italy) Siegfried Stohr	Trivellato Racing Team	March-BMW 792	10	Gear Selector
DNF	11	(Italy) Alberto Colombo	Sanremo Racing Srl	March-BMW 782	5	Suspension
DNF	16	(Argentina) Miguel Ángel Guerra	Racing Team Everest	March-BMW 792	2	Accident damage
DNF	1	(Switzerland) Marc Surer	Polifac BMW Junior Team	March-BMW 792	2	Engine
DNF	25	(Argentina) Cocho López	BFO Racing Team	March-BMW 792	1	Accident
DNF	39	(Italy) Pasquale Barbiero	Pasquale Barbiero	March-BMW 782	1	Engine
DQ	14	(United Kingdom) Brian Henton	Toleman Group Motorsport	Ralt-Hart RT2	1st on track	Disobeyed marshal
DNQ	31	(Italy) Carlo Giorgio	RR Racing Team/Scuderia Jolly Club Milano	March-Hart 742		

- Fastest lap: Stephen South, 1:33.20secs. (118.81 mph)
