= 1979 Rhein-Pokalrennen =

- 8th race in the 1979 European Formula Two season

Race details
- Date: 10 June 1979
- Official name: 14th Rhein-Pokalrennen
- Location: Hockenheimring
- Course: Permanent racing facility
- Course length: 6.789 km (4.218 miles)
- Distance: 40 laps, 271.560 km (168.720 miles)

Pole position
Driver	(United Kingdom) Stephen South	March-BMW
- Time: 1:58.36

Fastest lap
Driver	(Italy) Alberto Colombo	March-BMW
- Time: 1:59.98

Podium
First	(United Kingdom) Stephen South	March-BMW
Second	(Republic of Ireland) Derek Daly	March-BMW
Third	(Italy) Beppe Gabbiani	March-BMW

The 14th Rhein-Pokalrennen (Rhine-Cup Race), was the Round Eight of the 1979 European Championship for F2 Drivers. This was the second time F2 visited the Hockenheimring, during the 1979 season, with the race on 10 June.

== Report ==
=== Entry ===
A total of 30 F2 cars were entered for the event, however just 24 took part in qualifying. As with previous F2 events at Hockenheim, the race would be run over two heats, and the result aggregated to decide the winner.

=== Qualifying ===
Stephen South took pole position for the Project Four Racing – ICI Racing Team, in his March-BMW 792, for both Heats.

=== Race ===
The final was held over 40 laps of the Hockenheim Grand Prix circuit, split into two 20 lap heats. Stephen South took impressive lights-to-flag victories in both heats, for the Project Four Racing – ICI Racing Team, in their March-BMW 792. South won in an aggregated time of 1hr 20:56.57mins., averaging a speed of 126.004 mph. Second place went to his team-mate, Derek Daly. The best of the works March's was Beppe Gabbiani in third, ahead of Patrick Gaillard, Marc Surer and Bobby Rahal. Guest driver, Hans-Joachim Stuck had pushed South hard during Heat 1, before retiring with engine failure.

== Classification ==
=== Aggregate Results ===
Pos.	No.	Driver	Entrant	Car - Engine	Time, Laps	Reason Out
1st	8	(United Kingdom) Stephen South	Project Four Racing – ICI Racing Team	March-BMW 792	1hr 20:56.57	
2nd	7	(Republic of Ireland) Derek Daly	Project Four Racing – ICI Racing Team	March-BMW 792	1hr 21:09.49	
3rd	3	(Italy) Beppe Gabbiani	Polifac BMW Junior Team	March-BMW 792	1hr 21:34.21	
4th	39	(France) Patrick Gaillard	Chevron Cars	Chevron-Hart B48	1hr 21:58.17	
5th	1	(Switzerland) Marc Surer	Polifac BMW Junior Team	March-BMW 792	1hr 22:13.4	
6th	6	(United States) Bobby Rahal	Ampex Chevron Racing Team	Chevron-Hart B48	1hr 22:26.08	
7th	26	(Austria) Markus Höttinger	Jägermeister Racing Team	March-BMW 792	1hr 22:27.21	
8th	21	(United Kingdom) Norman Dickson	Dickson's of Perth	March-Hart 792	1hr 23:35.74	
9th	29	(Austria) Walter Raus	Österreicher Automobil Sport Club	March-BMW 792	39	
NC	22	(Sweden) Eje Elgh	Marlboro Team Tiga	March-BMW 792	37	
NC	4	(Italy) Teo Fabi	March Racing Ltd	March-BMW 792	34	
NC	5	(Argentina) Juan Traverso	March Racing Team (Bob Salisbury Racing)	March-BMW 792	31	
NC	11	(Italy) Alberto Colombo	Sanremo Racing Srl	March-BMW 782	30	
NC	10	(West Germany) Hans-Joachim Stuck	March Racing Ltd	March-BMW 792	26	
NC	23	(Netherlands) Huub Rothengatter	Docking Spitzley Racing / Racing Team Holland	Chevron-Hart B48	23	
NC	19	(Italy) Siegfried Stohr	Trivellato Racing Team	March-BMW 792	21	
NC	16	(Argentina) Miguel Ángel Guerra	Racing Team Everest	March-BMW 792	20	
NC	12	(Argentina) Ariel Bakst	Sanremo Racing Srl	March-BMW 792	20	
NC	77	(United Kingdom) Derek Warwick	Team BP with Theodore Racing	March-Hart 792	19	
NC	14	(United Kingdom) Brian Henton	Toleman Group Motorsport	Ralt-Hart RT2	15	
NC	9	(United States) Eddie Cheever	Osella Squadra Corse SH	Osella-BMW FA2/79	9	
NC	45	(Switzerland) Eugen Strähl	Lista Racing Team	March-Hart 782	5	
NC	15	(South Africa) Rad Dougall	Toleman Group Motorsport	Ralt-Hart RT2	1	
DNS	27	(West Germany) Armin Hahne	MM Mampe Team	Maurer-BMW MM1		Piston

- Fastest lap: Alberto Colombo, 1:59.98secs. (127.200 mph)

=== Heat 1 ===
Pos.	Driver	Time, Laps	Reason Out
1st	South	40:25.61	
2nd	Daly	40:36.85	
3rd	Stuck	40:41.88	
4th	Surer	40:54.66	
5th	Gabbiani	40:55.15	
6th	Guerra	40:55.34	
7th	Stohr	41:09.50	
8th	Rahal	41:09.85	
9th	Gaillard	41:17.37	
10th	Höttinger	41:26.37	
11th	Dickson	41:36.87	
12th	Raus	41:46.79	
13th	Baskt	41:53.91	
14th	Traverso	42:00.58	
15th	Warwick	19	
NC	Elgh	17	
NC	Henton	15	Gearbox
NC	Fabi	14	Throttle linkage
NC	Colombo	10	
DNF	Cheever	9	Accident
DNF	Strähl	3	Engine
DNF	Rothengatter	3	Accident
DNF	Dougall	1	Accident

=== Heat 2 ===
Pos.	Driver	Time, Laps	Reason Out
1st	South	40:30.96	
2nd	Daly	40:32.64	
3rd	Gabbiani	40:39.06	
4th	Fabi	40:39.83	
5th	Elgh	40:40.24	
6th	Colombo	40:40.47	
7th	Gaillard	40:40.80	
8th	Höttinger	41:00.84	
9th	Rothengatter	41:05.61	
10th	Rahal	41:16.13	
11th	Surer	41:18.74	
12th	Dickson	41:58.87	
13th	Raus	19	
DNF	Traverso	11	Engine
DNF	Stuck	6	Engine
DNF	Stohr	1	Accident
DNF	Warwick	0	Accident
DNF	Cheever	0	Accident
DNF	Baskt	0	Accident
DNF	Guerra	0	Accident
