= Alberto Colombo =

Alberto Colombo may refer to:

- Alberto Colombo (racing driver) (1946–2024), Italian racing driver
- Alberto Colombo (composer) (1888–1954), American film composer and music director
