= Miguel Ángel Guerra =

Argentine racing driver (born 1953)

- Guerra in 1989
- Born: 31 August 1953 (age 73); Buenos Aires, Argentina

Formula One World Championship career
- Nationality: (Argentina) Argentine
- Active years: 1981
- Team: Osella
- Entries: 4 (1 start)
- Championships: 0
- Wins: 0
- Podiums: 0
- Career points: 0
- Pole positions: 0
- Fastest laps: 0
- First entry: 1981 United States Grand Prix West
- Last entry: 1981 San Marino Grand Prix

Championship titles
- 1989 1975–1977: TC2000 Championship; Argentine Formula Two Championship

Miguel Ángel Guerra (born 31 August 1953) is a former racing driver from Argentina. He participated in four Formula One Grands Prix, debuting on 15 March 1981. He qualified for only one of these, the 1981 San Marino Grand Prix, in which his Osella was hit by the March of Eliseo Salazar on the first lap. Guerra's car hit a wall, and he suffered a broken wrist and ankle.

Following his Formula One career, Guerra competed in multiple Argentine and South American championships. In 1984, he was vice-champion of Formula Two Codasur, and in 1989, he won the TC 2000 championship. He also raced in South American Formula Three, Turismo Nacional, Turismo Carretera, Top Race and South American Super Touring Car Championship.

== Racing record ==
=== Complete European Formula Two Championship results ===
(key) (Races in bold indicate pole position; races in italics indicate fastest lap)

Year	Entrant	Chassis	Engine	1	2	3	4	5	6	7	8	9	10	11	12	Pos.	Pts
1979	Everest	March 792	BMW	SIL; 7	HOC; 3	THR; 4	NÜR; 15	VLL; Ret	MUG; 9	PAU; 6	HOC; Ret	ZAN; 8	PER; Ret	MIS; Ret	DON; Ret	14th	8
1980	Minardi	Minardi GM75	BMW	THR; Ret	HOC; 7	NÜR; 8	VLL; 8	PAU; 5	SIL; 6	ZOL; 5	MUG; 4	ZAN; 9	PER; Ret	MIS; 5	HOC	9th	10
1981	Minardi	Minardi Fly 281	Ferrari	SIL	HOC	THR	NÜR	VAL	MUG	PAU	PER	SPA	DON	MIS; 13	MAN	NC	0

=== Complete Formula One results ===
(key)

Year	Entrant	Chassis	Engine	1	2	3	4	5	6	7	8	9	10	11	12	13	14	15	WDC	Points
1981	Osella Squadra Corse	Osella FA1B	Cosworth V8	USW; DNQ	BRA; DNQ	ARG; DNQ	SMR; Ret	BEL	MON	ESP	FRA	GBR	GER	AUT	NED	ITA	CAN	CPL	NC	0

Sporting positions
Preceded by Jorge de Amorrortu	Argentine Formula Two Champion; 1975-1977	Succeeded by Agustín Beamonte
Preceded by Juan María Traverso	TC2000 champion 1989	Succeeded by Juan María Traverso
