= 1978 European Formula Two Championship =

1978 European Formula Two season

Seasons
- ← 1977 1979 →

The 1978 European Formula Two season was contested over 12 rounds. Italian driver Bruno Giacomelli, driving the works March car, won the season in dominant fashion.

== Calendar ==
Race No	Circuit	Date	Laps	Distance	Time	Speed	Pole position	Fastest lap	Winner
1	(United Kingdom) Thruxton	27 March	55	3.792=208.560 km	1'06:13.77	188.943 km/h	(Italy) Bruno Giacomelli	(Italy) Bruno Giacomelli	(Italy) Bruno Giacomelli
2	(West Germany) Hockenheim	9 April	20+20	6.789=271.56 km	1'20:22.0	202.741 km/h	(Italy) Bruno Giacomelli	(Italy) Bruno Giacomelli (Switzerland) Marc Surer	(Italy) Bruno Giacomelli
3	(West Germany) Nürburgring (Eifelrennen)	30 April	9	22.835=205,515 km	1'06:34.2	185.232 km/h	(Italy) Bruno Giacomelli	(Finland) Keke Rosberg	(Brazil) Alex Ribeiro
4	(France) Pau	15 May	73	2.76=201.48 km	1'33:11.73	129.714 km/h	(United Kingdom) Brian Henton	(Italy) Bruno Giacomelli	(Italy) Bruno Giacomelli
5	(Italy) Mugello	28 May	42	5.245=220.290 km	1'15:39.7	174.691 km/h	(Italy) Bruno Giacomelli	(United States) Eddie Cheever	(Republic of Ireland) Derek Daly
6	(Italy) Vallelunga	4 June	65	3.2=208.0 km	1'17:12.2	161.651 km/h	(Italy) Bruno Giacomelli	(Italy) Bruno Giacomelli	(Republic of Ireland) Derek Daly
7	(France) Rouen	18 June	38	5.543=210.634 km	1'08:43.2	183.906 km/h	(Italy) Bruno Giacomelli	(Brazil) Ingo Hoffmann	(Italy) Bruno Giacomelli
8	(United Kingdom) Donington Park	25 June	40+40	3.149=251.92 km	1'29:51.43	168.214 km/h	(Italy) Bruno Giacomelli	(United Kingdom) Brian Henton	(Finland) Keke Rosberg
9	(France) Nogaro	9 July	65	3.12=202.80 km	1'19:12.23	153.629 km/h	(Italy) Bruno Giacomelli	(Italy) Bruno Giacomelli	(Italy) Bruno Giacomelli
10	(Italy) Pergusa-Enna	23 July	41	4.95=202.95 km	1'04:05.6	189.989 km/h	(Republic of Ireland) Derek Daly	(Republic of Ireland) Derek Daly	(Italy) Bruno Giacomelli
11	(Italy) Misano	6 August	60	3.488=209.28 km	1'13:45.09	170.258 km/h	(United Kingdom) Brian Henton	(Italy) Bruno Giacomelli	(Italy) Bruno Giacomelli
12	(West Germany) Hockenheim	24 September	20+20	6.789=271.56 km	1'20:20.02	202.824 km/h	(Switzerland) Marc Surer	(Republic of Ireland) Derek Daly	(Italy) Bruno Giacomelli

Note:

Race 2, 8 and 12 were held in two heats, with results shown in aggregate.

== Final point standings ==
Points were awarded to the top six classified non-graded finishers. Only the best nine results were counted.

Numbers without parentheses are championship points; numbers in parentheses are total points scored. Points were awarded in the following system:

Position	1st	2nd	3rd	4th	5th	6th
Race	9	6	4	3	2	1

Pos	Driver	THR (United Kingdom)	HOC1 (West Germany)	NÜR (West Germany)	PAU (France)	MUG (Italy)	VLL (Italy)	ROU (France)	DON (United Kingdom)	NOG (France)	ENN (Italy)	MIS (Italy)	HOC2 (West Germany)	Pts
1	(Italy) Bruno Giacomelli	1^{P}^{F}	1^{P}^{F}	Ret^{P}	1^{F}	(3)^{P}	2^{P}^{F}	1^{P}	Ret^{P}	1^{P}^{F}	1	1^{F}	1	78 (82)
2	(Switzerland) Marc Surer	2	2^{F}	(4)	3	2	9	3	3	2	Ret	2	2^{P}	48 (51)
3	(Republic of Ireland) Derek Daly	6	9	Ret	9†	1	1	11†	Ret	3	3^{P}^{F}	9†	Ret^{F}	27
4	(United States) Eddie Cheever	4	Ret	3	5	7^{F}	Ret	2	Ret	9	2	6	Ret	24
5	(Finland) Keke Rosberg	Ret	8	2^{F}	DNS	Ret	Ret		1	17†				16
6	(Italy) Piero Necchi	Ret	Ret	Ret	4	Ret	3	DNQ	2	10	Ret	DNQ	Ret	13
=	(Brazil) Ingo Hoffmann	Ret	4	6	Ret	4	Ret	Ret^{F}	4	5	Ret	10	14	13
8	(Brazil) Alex Ribeiro	15	6	1	NC	10	NC	10	Ret	Ret	7	13		11
=	(West Germany) Manfred Winkelhock	5	12	Ret	8	9	4	12†	5	7	9	Ret	3	11
=	(Italy) Alberto Colombo	8	5	7	NC	5		4	Ret	4	Ret	8	15	11
11	(Sweden) Eje Elgh	DNQ	DNQ	9	2	13	DNQ	6	Ret	13	Ret	DNQ	6	8
=	(Argentina) Ricardo Zunino	14	Ret	13	Ret	18	6	5	9	DNS	5	7	5	8
13	(South Africa) Rad Dougall	3	10	Ret		12	Ret	DNQ	6	DNQ	Ret	Ret	Ret	5
14	(Italy) Elio de Angelis	Ret	Ret	10		14	10	Ret	13†	12	Ret	3	DNS	4
=	(United Kingdom) Geoff Lees								Ret	6	DNQ	4	Ret	4
16	(Italy) Piercarlo Ghinzani	10	Ret	Ret	Ret	8	7	Ret	Ret	8	4	Ret	10	3
=	(United Kingdom) Stephen South								Ret				4	3
=	(United Kingdom) Brian Henton	Ret	17	5	Ret^{P}	15	8	14†	11^{F}	Ret	6	11^{P}	Ret	3
19	(Italy) Beppe Gabbiani	7	11	Ret		Ret	5	DNQ	DNQ	15	Ret	12	DNQ	2
20	(Italy) Roberto Marazzi	DNQ	18	12	7	11	Ret	DNQ	DNQ					1
—	(Netherlands) Boy Hayje	11	16	14		23	DNQ	7	Ret			DNQ	7	0
—	(Argentina) Miguel Ángel Guerra					16	13	DNQ	7	Ret	8	DNQ	12	0
—	(Italy) Gianfranco Brancatelli		DNQ					DNQ	8		Ret	Ret		0
—	(Netherlands) Michael Bleekemolen									DNQ	Ret		8	0
—	(Austria) Peter Scharmann		14	11						DNQ	10	15	9	0
—	(West Germany) Axel Plankenhorn		15	Ret				9	DNQ					0
—	(Australia) Larry Perkins	9												0
—	(United States) John David Briggs	13	DNQ	Ret	DNQ	19	11	DNQ	10	DNQ	Ret	DNQ	Ret	0
—	(United States) Don Breidenbach	Ret	DNQ	Ret	10†	20	12	DNQ	12	16	DNS	DNQ	DNQ	0
—	(Italy) Sandro Cinotti		Ret	Ret	DNQ	Ret	Ret			14	12	17	11	0
—	(France) Richard Dallest	NC	DNQ							11	Ret	16	DNQ	0
—	(Argentina) Ariel Bakst	17	Ret	Ret		DNQ	DNQ				11	DNQ		0
—	(Belgium) Bernard de Dryver	Ret	13	Ret	DNQ	Ret	DNQ	Ret		DNQ	Ret	DNQ		0
—	(France) Jean-Pierre Jaussaud							13		Ret				0
—	(Switzerland) Markus Hotz												13	0
—	(United Kingdom) Norman Dickson			16					DNQ			14		0
—	(West Germany) Wolfgang Locher			17	DNQ	NC	14						Ret	0
—	(West Germany) Michael Korten		DNQ	15									DNQ	0
—	(Italy) Giacomo Agostini	18	DNQ	18		17	DNQ	DNQ	DNQ	DNQ	DNQ	DNQ	16	0
—	(Switzerland) Romeo Camathias	16	DNQ											0
—	(Italy) Giancarlo Martini			19			DNQ							0
—	(Italy) Gianfranco Trombetti					21					DNQ			0
—	(Austria) Walter Raus	DNQ	DNQ			22	DNQ					DNQ	DNQ	0
—	(France) José Dolhem				Ret	Ret		DNQ						0
—	(Japan) Kazuyoshi Hoshino							Ret	Ret					0
—	(France) Alain Couderc							Ret		DNS			DNQ	0
—	(Italy) Carlo Giorgio	DNQ	DNQ	Ret			DNQ	DNQ			DNQ			0
—	(Italy) Sergio Mingotti			DNQ		DSQ	DNQ							0
—	(West Germany) Dieter Kern		DNQ	Ret									DNQ	0
—	(Austria) Harald Ertl		Ret										DNQ	0
—	(Austria) Hans Meier	Ret												0
—	(Belgium) Patrick Nève	Ret												0
—	(United States) James King			Ret										0
—	(Italy) Riccardo Patrese			Ret										0
—	(West Germany) Rudolf Dötsch			Ret										0
—	(France) Alain Prost				Ret									0
—	(United Kingdom) Tiff Needell												Ret	0
—	(France) Marc Sourd												Ret	0
—	(Italy) Giancarlo Naddeo					DNQ	DNQ	DNQ			DNQ	DNQ		0
—	(Switzerland) Gérard Pillon		DNQ				DNQ						DNQ	0
—	(France) Pierre Maublanc	DNQ					DNQ							0
—	(Italy) Gaudenzio Mantova						DNQ					DNQ		0
—	(West Germany) Helmut Bross		DNQ										DNQ	0
—	(Austria) Gerd Biechteler		DNQ											0
—	(West Germany) Kurt Lotterschmid		DNQ											0
—	(West Germany) Peter Dienemann		DNQ											0
—	(France) Michel Leclère							DNQ						0
—	(United Kingdom) Nigel Mansell								DNQ					0
—	(United Kingdom) Tony Trimmer								DNQ					0
—	(Italy) Luciano Pavesi											DNQ		0
—	(Italy) Gimax											DNQ		0
—	(Austria) Herbert Jerich											DNQ		0
—	(United Kingdom) Divina Galica												DNQ	0
—	(Italy) Alessandro Pesenti-Rossi												DNQ	0
—	(West Germany) Henning Hagenbauer												DNQ	0
—	(Italy) Marco Micangeli												DNQ	0
—	(West Germany) Klaus Walz												DNQ	0
—	(West Germany) Eugen Grupp												DNQ	0
Graded drivers ineligible for points
—	(France) Jean-Pierre Jarier	Ret	3				Ret	8						0
—	(Italy) Arturo Merzario					6						5		0
—	(France) Patrick Tambay				6†									0
—	(West Germany) Jochen Mass	12	7	8										0
—	(France) Jacques Laffite				11†					Ret				0
—	(Switzerland) Clay Regazzoni											Ret		0
Pos	Driver	THR (United Kingdom)	HOC1 (West Germany)	NÜR (West Germany)	PAU (France)	MUG (Italy)	VLL (Italy)	ROU (France)	DON (United Kingdom)	NOG (France)	ENN (Italy)	MIS (Italy)	HOC2 (West Germany)	Pts

Key
Colour	Result
Gold	Winner
Silver	Second place
Bronze	Third place
Green	Other points position
Blue	Other classified position
Blue	Not classified, finished (NC)
Purple	Not classified, retired (Ret)
Red	Did not qualify (DNQ)
Red	Did not pre-qualify (DNPQ)
Black	Disqualified (DSQ)
White	Did not start (DNS)
White	Race cancelled (C)
Blank	Did not practice (DNP)
Blank	Excluded (EX)
Blank	Did not arrive (DNA)
Blank	Withdrawn (WD)
Blank	Did not enter (empty cell)
Annotation	Meaning
P	Pole position
F	Fastest lap
†	Did not finish, but classified for completing over 90% of the race distance
