= 1979 European Formula Two Championship =

1979 European Formula Two season

Seasons
- ← 1978 1980 →

The 1979 European Formula Two season was contested over 12 rounds. Polifac BMW Junior driver Marc Surer clinched the championship title.

== Season summary ==
Champions in 1978, March expanded to seven works cars, all new ground effects 792 models powered by BMW 4-cylinder engines and running on Goodyear tyres. 1978 runner-up Marc Surer started as pre-season favourite; his team-mates would include Beppe Gabbiani, Ricardo Zunino, Miguel Ángel Guerra and Teo Fabi. Others were provided for guest drivers, ranging from Formula One stars like Clay Regazzoni and Hans-Joachim Stuck or promising Formula Three stars like Andrea de Cesaris or Stefan Johansson. ICI Racing's cars were looked after by Ron Dennis' Project 4 outfit, with Derek Daly and Stephen South driving while Bob Salisbury entered a car for Juan María Traverso.

Ralt had handed over their team to Toleman. They struck a deal with Brian Hart to run his 420R 4-cylinder engine for the experienced Brian Henton and Rad Dougall. Osella would be running a BMW-engined in-house car (albeit using a four-year-old design penned by Giorgio Stirano, renamed the FA2/79) for Eddie Cheever; their main strength was an exclusive deal for Pirelli tyres. Chevron hired experienced Formula 1 designer Tony Southgate to create the B48 ground effects car with Paul Owens, based on the 1978 B42 chassis. Bobby Rahal drove the works car (with a Hart engine) with machines also sold to privateers Siegfried Stohr (BMW engine) and Huub Rothengatter (also Hart). AGS continued to run their 1977 car, with Alain Couderc driving; Pilbeam's MP42 would be driven by Patrick Nève, Maurer employed Armin Hahne and AMS ran Piero Necchi.

Privateers included Derek Warwick in a Theodore March-Hart, Alberto Colombo in a March-BMW and Eje Elgh in Tiga's March-BMW.

=== Round 1 - Silverstone ===
The race - now bearing the BRDC International Trophy name - took place in heavy rain, allowing Cheever to demonstrate Pirelli's wet weather superiority in the well-tested Osella-BMW. He dominated until a multiple accident involving Stohr at the Woodcote chicane caused a race stoppage after two laps. After the restart Henton and Daly pushed the American hard until Henton suffered gear selection problems and Daly span. The latter recovered strongly after the rain stopped and the track dried out to take the lead, only to suffer gear linkage problems, allowing Cheever through to take victory on the last lap by only three-tenths of a second. Henton held on to take 3rd ahead of Rahal, with South (despite twice leaving the track at Woodcote) and Columbo completing the top six. The fancied March cars proved a disappointment - the 792 was overweight and generated too much grip, resulting in a machine with heavy handling. Surer failed to start the race after sliding off on the parade lap and being hit by team-mate Gabbiani.

=== Round 2 - Hockenheim ===
The two-heat race was named as the Jim Clark Memorial Race in honour of the Scottish legend killed at the circuit in 1968. Standing in for the absent Daly (driving for Ensign at the US West Grand Prix), Keke Rosberg started 3rd and took a dominant win some 27 seconds ahead of Dougall, Guerra, Henton (struggling with damaged rear suspension), Cheever (having chosen the wrong tyre compound) and Fabi; . Surer span out after dicing with Rosberg early on in the first heat as dislodging a skirt from his car. South set fastest lap but retired with a puncture.

=== Round 3 - Thruxton ===
Dougall took a shock victory in the BARC Philips Car Radio International - and the points lead of the series - despite having to switch to the Toleman team's old March 782 after problems with the new Ralt. The other scorers were Daly, Columbo, Guerra, Rahal and Rothengatter in a race that only yielded eight classified finishers. Five of the front-runners - Henton, South, Warwick, Gabbiani and Fabi - were eliminated in a pile-up at the first corner. Cheever led until retiring mid-distance, while Surer dropped out with engine trouble.

=== Round 4 - Nürburgring ===
At the ADAC Eifelrennen, Surer scored his first points of the season with a daring victory, having started on slicks despite half of the daunting 14-mile circuit still being wet when the race started. A late challenge was mounted by spirited pole-sitter Rosberg (again covering Daly's F1 commitments), who approached the track's F1 lap record before his throttle jammed open and his ICI March was destroyed at the same corner which claimed team-mate South. Instead Henton took 2nd in another old March, Manfred Winkelhock (making a one-off appearance in a BMW-engined Ralt) took 3rd ahead of Stohr, Rothengatter and Dougall.

=== Round 5 - Vallelunga ===
Surer won a second successive race in the troublesome March to join Dougall at the top of the championship table. Stohr came 2nd in one of the equally difficult Chevron cars, guest driver Maurizio Flammini was 3rd, Rahal 4th, Dougall 5th and another guest - Italian Formula Three star Andrea de Cesaris - 6th. Henton had led in the March before picking up a puncture. He lapped swiftly after getting repairs only to collide with an abandoned car which had not been removed correctly by the marshals.

=== Round 6 - Mugello ===
The Ralt finally worked properly, getting Henton through to victory, allowing 'Superhen' to take the series lead. Gabbiani came home 2nd and Elgh 3rd - their first points of the year - ahead of Fabi, Warwick and the consistent Rahal. Daly qualified on the front row alongside Henton but was taken off in a first-corner collision with Surer and guest-driver Regazzoni.

=== Round 7 - Pau ===
Wet weather again allowed Cheever's skill and Pirelli's grip to come to the fore, the American taking a comfortable victory after colliding with Daly when challenging the Irishman on lap 30; the March was forced into retirement. Stohr took 2nd while 3rd for Surer saw him share the title lead with Henton (who retired on the first lap, sliding off the wet track). Gabbiani, Patrick Gaillard and Guerra completed the top 6.

=== Round 8 - Hockenheim ===
The second visit to Hockenheim saw an impressive lights-to-flag victory for South in both heats, ahead of ICI team-mate Daly. Gabbiani finished 3rd from Gaillard, Surer (two points seeing him move ahead of Henton in the table; the British driver fell out of contention in the race with gearbox trouble) and Rahal. Guest driver Stuck had pushed South hard in the first heat before engine failure.

=== Round 9 - Zandvoort ===
Hastily arranged as a replacement for the cancelled race at Nogaro, the Dutch track's abrasive surface handed an advantage to the Pirelli-shod Cheever, who promptly won his 3rd victory of the year to leapfrog to the top of the table. Fabi took his best result yet in a strong 2nd place, while 3rd for team-mate Surer kept the Swiss firmly in title contention. Columbo finished 4th with a tyre-troubled Henton 5th and Elgh 6th.

=== Round 10 - Enna ===
Toleman's Rory Byrne had substantially revised the Ralt over the summer break between rounds 8 and 9, and it looked like his work had borne fruit with Henton winning at Enna after a furious battle with Elgh. However, Tiga protested the result as Henton had used an escape road on the first lap avoiding a crash. The race organisers agreed and disqualified the British driver; his appeal would not be concluded until after the season had finished. Elgh was followed home by Daly (delayed by the first corner incident), South (despite a stop to replace a damaged nosecone), Fabi, Cheever and Dougall promoted to 6th after Henton's disqualification.

=== Round 11 - Misano ===
The modified Ralt once again starred, Henton this time taking victory without controversy from Gabbiani, Surer, Traverso, Stohr (now in a March) and Cheever. Daly had provided the strongest challenge to Henton before his gear linkage fell apart. The race was marred by a poor track surface.

=== Round 12 - Donington ===
The championship was finely balanced ahead of the final race. Henton led by a single point with his appeal against the Enna disqualification still to be heard, with Surer and Cheever equal 2nd. Fabi and Daly took the front row of the grid. Henton was 3rd after crashing twice in practice, with Surer - also suffering an accident - 4th. Cheever could only manage 10th. Daly dominated much of the race, chased hard by Henton, leaving Surer to battle over 3rd place with South. Cheever, struggling in the heavy Osella with Pirelli tyres that didn't suit the warm conditions, was never a factor, eventually finishing 7th. The title looked like it was Henton's until two laps from the end when he suffered brake failure at the Old Hairpin and slid off the track, allowing Surer and South through. The Swiss took the title by two points, a result confirmed when Henton's appeal was thrown out a few weeks later. Daly's victory was enough to take him to 3rd overall ahead of Cheever despite the Irishman only contesting nine of the twelve rounds.

== Calendar ==
Race No	Circuit	Date	Laps	Distance	Time	Speed	Pole position	Fastest lap	Winner
Rd.1	(United Kingdom) Silverstone	25 March	40	4.719=188.76 km	1'01:42.52	183.533 km/h	(United States) Eddie Cheever	(Republic of Ireland) Derek Daly	(United States) Eddie Cheever
Rd.2	(West Germany) Hockenheim	8 April	20+20	6.789=271.56 km	1'20:27.1	202.527 km/h	(Switzerland) Marc Surer	(United Kingdom) Stephen South	(Finland) Keke Rosberg
Rd.3	(United Kingdom) Thruxton	16 April	55	3.792=208.560 km	1'04:10.31	195.001 km/h	(South Africa) Rad Dougall	(Switzerland) Marc Surer	(South Africa) Rad Dougall
Rd.4	(West Germany) Nürburgring	29 April	9	22.835=205,515 km	1'12:46.7	169.431 km/h	(Finland) Keke Rosberg	(West Germany) Manfred Winkelhock	(Switzerland) Marc Surer
Rd.5	(Italy) Vallelunga	13 May	65	3.2=208.0 km	1'16:34.9	162.963 km/h	(United Kingdom) Stephen South	(United Kingdom) Brian Henton	(Switzerland) Marc Surer
Rd.6	(Italy) Mugello	20 May	42	5.245=220.290 km	1'15:46.8	174.418 km/h	(United Kingdom) Brian Henton	(Italy) Beppe Gabbiani	(United Kingdom) Brian Henton
Rd.7	(France) Pau	3 June	73	2.76=201.48 km	1'54:30.00	105.579 km/h	(Switzerland) Marc Surer	(United States) Eddie Cheever	(United States) Eddie Cheever
Rd.8	(West Germany) Hockenheim	10 June	20+20	6.789=271.56 km	1'20:56.57	201.298 km/h	(United Kingdom) Stephen South	(Italy) Alberto Colombo	(United Kingdom) Stephen South
Rd.9	(Netherlands) Zandvoort	15 July	50	4.226=211.30 km	1'09:37.86	182.074 km/h	(United Kingdom) Brian Henton	(United States) Eddie Cheever	(United States) Eddie Cheever
Rd.10	(Italy) Pergusa-Enna	29 July	45	4.95=222.75 km	1'11:02.9	188.111 km/h	(United Kingdom) Brian Henton	(United Kingdom) Stephen South	(Sweden) Eje Elgh
Rd.11	(Italy) Misano	5 August	60	3.488=209.28 km	1'14:29.0	168.585 km/h	(United Kingdom) Brian Henton	(United Kingdom) Brian Henton	(United Kingdom) Brian Henton
Rd.12	(United Kingdom) Donington Park	19 August	65	3.150=204.75 km	1'11:53.20	170.864 km/h	(Republic of Ireland) Derek Daly	(Republic of Ireland) Derek Daly	(Republic of Ireland) Derek Daly

Note:

Race 2 and 8 were held in two heats, with results shown in aggregate.

Race 1 originally scheduled over 47 laps, but stopped after 2 laps and restarted due to an accident involving Siegfried Stohr.

== Drivers' Championship ==
Points were awarded to the top six classified finishers. Only the best ten results were counted. For the first time, graded drivers were eligible to score championship points, with a trophy to be awarded to the top non-graded driver in the event that a graded driver won the championship. This was moot, however, as no graded driver finished in the points this season.

Points were awarded in the following system:

Position	1st	2nd	3rd	4th	5th	6th
Race	9	6	4	3	2	1

Pos	Driver	SIL (United Kingdom)	HOC (West Germany)	THR (United Kingdom)	NÜR (West Germany)	VAL (Italy)	MUG (Italy)	PAU (France)	HOC (West Germany)	ZAN (Netherlands)	PER (Italy)	MIS (Italy)	DON (United Kingdom)	Pts
1	(Switzerland) Marc Surer	DNS	Ret	9	1	1	Ret	3	5	3	Ret	3	2	38
2	(United Kingdom) Brian Henton	3	4	Ret	2	Ret	1	Ret	Ret	5	DSQ	1	4	36
3	(Republic of Ireland) Derek Daly	2		2			Ret	Ret	2	11	2	Ret	1	33
4	(United States) Eddie Cheever	1	5	Ret	8	Ret	Ret	1	Ret	1	5	6	7	32
5	(South Africa) Rad Dougall	Ret	2	1	6	5	15	Ret	Ret	Ret	6	Ret	Ret	19
6	(United Kingdom) Stephen South	5	Ret	Ret	Ret	Ret	Ret	8	1	Ret	3	8	3	19
7	(Italy) Giuseppe Gabbiani	DNS	Ret	Ret	11	Ret	2	4	3	Ret	9	2	DNS	19
8	(Italy) Siegfried Stohr	Ret	9	Ret	4	2	11	2	Ret	7	Ret	5	Ret	17
9	(Sweden) Eje Elgh	Ret	Ret	Ret	12	9	3	Ret	Ret	6	1	Ret	5	16
10	(Italy) Teo Fabi	Ret	6	Ret	14	Ret	4	Ret	Ret	2	4	11	Ret	13
11	(United States) Bobby Rahal	4	7	5	Ret	4	6	Ret	6	Ret	Ret	7		10
12	(Finland) Keke Rosberg		1		Ret									9
13	(Italy) Alberto Colombo	6	10	3	Ret	8	7	7	Ret	4	Ret	10	Ret	8
14	(Argentina) Miguel Ángel Guerra	7	3	4	15	Ret	9	6	Ret	8	Ret	Ret	Ret	8
15	(France) Patrick Gaillard				9			5	4				Ret	5
16	(Germany) Manfred Winkelhock				3									4
17	(Italy) Maurizio Flammini					3								4
18	(Argentina) Juan María Traverso	13	8	Ret	Ret	Ret	10	10	Ret		10	4	12	3
19	(Netherlands) Huub Rothengatter	8	Ret	6	5	Ret	Ret	DNQ	Ret	12	8	Ret	13	3
20	(United Kingdom) Derek Warwick	Ret	Ret	Ret	DNS	NC	5	9	Ret	Ret	Ret	Ret	10	2
21	(Italy) Oscar Pedersoli										Ret		6	1
22	(Italy) Andrea de Cesaris					6								1
—	(Austria) Markus Höttinger		13	7	7				7			Ret		0
—	(Argentina) Ariel Bakst	Ret	12	Ret	18	7	8	DNS	Ret	Ret	11			0
—	(Italy) Gianfranco Brancatelli									10	7		Ret	0
—	(United Kingdom) Adrian Russell	Ret		8						Ret				0
—	(United Kingdom) Norman Dickson								8					0
—	(United Kingdom) Tiff Needell												8	0
—	(Argentina) Osvaldo López									9	Ret	9	Ret	0
—	(Argentina) Ricardo Zunino	9	Ret	Ret	10									0
—	(Austria) Walter Raus								9	14		Ret		0
—	(Republic of Ireland) Eddie Jordan												9	0
—	(Italy) Carlo Giorgio	10		NC		10	13				DNQ	DNQ		0
—	(United Kingdom) Divina Galica	11			17								11	0
—	(France) Alain Couderc		11	Ret				Ret					Ret	0
—	(Germany) Wolfgang Locher	Ret	Ret	Ret	13	Ret	12	Ret						0
—	(United Kingdom) Kim Mather	12		NC									DNS	0
—	(Netherlands) Arie Luyendijk									13				0
—	(France) José Dolhem	14												0
—	(Italy) Giancarlo Martini						14							0
—	(Sweden) Anders Olofsson									15				0
—	(Belgium) Bernard de Dryver		Ret		16									0
—	(Italy) Sergio Mingotti					DNQ	16					DNQ		0
—	(Belgium) Patrick Nève	Ret	Ret	Ret	Ret									0
—	(Italy) Ferrante Ponti		Ret	Ret		Ret								0
—	(Switzerland) Clay Regazzoni		Ret				Ret					Ret		0
—	(United Kingdom) Warren Booth	Ret											Ret	0
—	(Germany) Jochen Dauer		Ret		Ret									0
—	(Germany) Armin Hahne				DNS	DNQ		DNQ	DNS			DNQ	Ret	0
—	(Italy) Lamberto Leoni					DNQ	Ret							0
—	(Italy) Pasquale Barberio										Ret	DNQ		0
—	(Switzerland) André Chevalley		Ret											0
—	(United Kingdom) Rupert Keegan					Ret								0
—	(France) Michel Leclère							Ret						0
—	(Germany) Hans-Joachim Stuck								Ret					0
—	(Switzerland) Eugen Strähl								Ret					0
—	(Netherlands) Boy Hayje									Ret				0
—	(Austria) Willy Siller											Ret		0
—	(Italy) Riccardo Paletti											Ret		0
—	(Sweden) Stefan Johansson												Ret	0
—	(Republic of Ireland) Bernard Devaney												Ret	0
—	(Italy) Piero Necchi											DSQ		0
—	(Italy) Fillipo Niccolini						DNS							0
—	(Germany) Klaus Walz		DNQ											0
Pos	Driver	SIL (United Kingdom)	HOC (West Germany)	THR (United Kingdom)	NÜR (West Germany)	VAL (Italy)	MUG (Italy)	PAU (France)	HOC (West Germany)	ZAN (Netherlands)	PER (Italy)	MIS (Italy)	DON (United Kingdom)	Pts

Colour	Result
Gold	Winner
Silver	Second place
Bronze	Third place
Green	Points classification
Blue	Non-points classification
Blue	Non-classified finish (NC)
Purple	Retired, not classified (Ret)
Red	Did not qualify (DNQ)
Red	Did not pre-qualify (DNPQ)
Black	Disqualified (DSQ)
White	Did not start (DNS)
White	Withdrew (WD)
White	Race cancelled (C)
Blank	Did not practice (DNP)
Blank	Did not arrive (DNA)
Blank	Excluded (EX)
