= 1981 Argentine Grand Prix =

- Race 3 of 15 in the 1981 Formula One World Championship

Race details
- Date: 12 April 1981
- Official name: XVII Gran Premio de la Republica Argentina
- Location: Autodromo Municipal Ciudad de Buenos Aires; Buenos Aires, Argentina
- Course: Permanent racing facility
- Course length: 5.968 km (3.708 miles)
- Distance: 53 laps, 316.304 km (196.542 miles)
- Weather: Sunny, dry

Pole position
Driver	(Brazil) Nelson Piquet	Brabham-Ford
- Time: 1:42.665

Fastest lap
Driver	(Brazil) Nelson Piquet	Brabham-Ford
- Time: 1:45.287 on lap 6

Podium
First	(Brazil) Nelson Piquet	Brabham-Ford
Second	(Argentina) Carlos Reutemann	Williams-Ford
Third	(France) Alain Prost	Renault

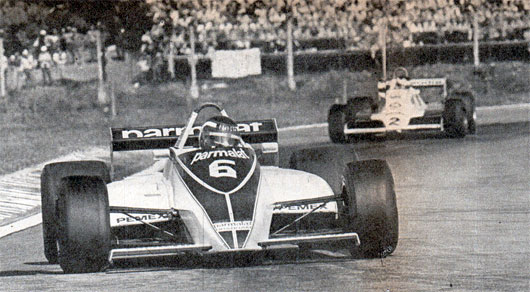
Héctor Rebaque in front, retired in lap 32, and Carlos Reutemann, who finished 2nd, in front of his home crowd.

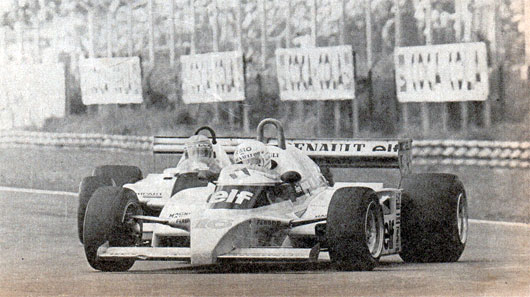
René Arnoux finished 5th for Renault.

The 1981 Argentine Grand Prix was the third race of the 1981 Formula One World Championship and was held at the Buenos Aires circuit in Argentina on 12 April 1981. This was the last Argentine Grand Prix until 1995. Thanks to designer Gordon Murray's alternative solution to flexible side skirts, the Brabham cars of Nelson Piquet and Héctor Rebaque were dominant in this race, with Piquet (who took pole at an average speed of 130.029 mph (209.261 km/h)) taking the lead immediately from Alan Jones on the back straight and Rebaque climbing up from 5th to 2nd over 23 laps.

== Classification ==
=== Qualifying ===
Pos	No	Driver	Constructor	Q1	Q2	Gap
1	5	(Brazil) Nelson Piquet	Brabham-Ford	1:42.665	1:44.364	—
2	15	(France) Alain Prost	Renault	1:42.981	1:43.748	+0.316
3	1	(Australia) Alan Jones	Williams-Ford	1:44.662	1:43.638	+0.973
4	2	(Argentina) Carlos Reutemann	Williams-Ford	1:43.935	1:44.094	+1.270
5	16	(France) René Arnoux	Renault	1:43.997	1:44.080	+1.332
6	6	(Mexico) Héctor Rebaque	Brabham-Ford	1:44.712	1:44.100	+1.435
7	27	(Canada) Gilles Villeneuve	Ferrari	1:44.236	1:44.132	+1.467
8	20	(Finland) Keke Rosberg	Fittipaldi-Ford	1:45.273	1:44.191	+1.526
9	29	(Italy) Riccardo Patrese	Arrows-Ford	1:45.008	1:45.357	+2.343
10	11	(Italy) Elio de Angelis	Lotus-Ford	1:45.252	1:45.065	+2.400
11	7	(United Kingdom) John Watson	McLaren-Ford	1:45.073	1:45.202	+2.408
12	28	(France) Didier Pironi	Ferrari	1:45.108	1:45.599	+2.443
13	3	(United States) Eddie Cheever	Tyrrell-Ford	1:45.117	1:45.357	+2.452
14	33	(France) Patrick Tambay	Theodore-Ford	1:46.872	1:45.297	+2.632
15	12	(United Kingdom) Nigel Mansell	Lotus-Ford	1:45.369	1:45.790	+2.704
16	14	(Switzerland) Marc Surer	Ensign-Ford	1:45.734	1:46.188	+3.069
17	22	(United States) Mario Andretti	Alfa Romeo	1:46.329	1:46.059	+3.394
18	8	(Italy) Andrea de Cesaris	McLaren-Ford	1:46.387	1:46.663	+3.722
19	30	(Italy) Siegfried Stohr	Arrows-Ford	1:47.342	1:46.444	+3.779
20	21	(Brazil) Chico Serra	Fittipaldi-Ford	1:46.743	1:46.706	+4.041
21	26	(France) Jacques Laffite	Ligier-Matra	1:46.854	1:47.594	+4.189
22	23	(Italy) Bruno Giacomelli	Alfa Romeo	1:47.109	1:46.918	+4.253
23	9	(Netherlands) Jan Lammers	ATS-Ford	1:47.174	1:47.576	+4.509
24	4	(Argentina) Ricardo Zunino	Tyrrell-Ford	1:47.464	1:48.143	+4.799
25	31	(Argentina) Miguel Angel Guerra	Osella-Ford	1:47.609	1:48.571	+4.944
26	32	(Italy) Beppe Gabbiani	Osella-Ford	1:48.121	1:48.203	+5.456
27	17	(Republic of Ireland) Derek Daly	March-Ford	1:48.191	1:49.571	+5.526
28	25	(France) Jean-Pierre Jabouille	Ligier-Matra	1:49.581	1:50.226	+6.916
29	18	(Chile) Eliseo Salazar	March-Ford	no time	1:51.086	+8.421

=== Race ===
Pos	No	Driver	Constructor	Laps	Time/Retired	Grid	Points
1	5	(Brazil) Nelson Piquet	Brabham-Ford	53	1:34:32.74	1	9
2	2	(Argentina) Carlos Reutemann	Williams-Ford	53	+ 26.61	4	6
3	15	(France) Alain Prost	Renault	53	+ 49.98	2	4
4	1	(Australia) Alan Jones	Williams-Ford	53	+ 1:07.88	3	3
5	16	(France) René Arnoux	Renault	53	+ 1:31.85	5	2
6	11	(Italy) Elio de Angelis	Lotus-Ford	52	+ 1 Lap	10	1
7	29	(Italy) Riccardo Patrese	Arrows-Ford	52	+ 1 Lap	9	
8	22	(United States) Mario Andretti	Alfa Romeo	52	+ 1 Lap	17	
9	30	(Italy) Siegfried Stohr	Arrows-Ford	52	+ 1 Lap	19	
10	23	(Italy) Bruno Giacomelli	Alfa Romeo	51	Out of Fuel	22	
11	8	(Italy) Andrea de Cesaris	McLaren-Ford	51	+ 2 Laps	18	
12	9	(Netherlands) Jan Lammers	ATS-Ford	51	+ 2 Laps	23	
13	4	(Argentina) Ricardo Zunino	Tyrrell-Ford	51	+ 2 Laps	24	
Ret	27	(Canada) Gilles Villeneuve	Ferrari	40	Transmission	7	
Ret	33	(France) Patrick Tambay	Theodore-Ford	36	Oil Leak	14	
Ret	7	(United Kingdom) John Watson	McLaren-Ford	36	Transmission	11	
Ret	6	(Mexico) Héctor Rebaque	Brabham-Ford	32	Electrical	6	
Ret	21	(Brazil) Chico Serra	Fittipaldi-Ford	28	Gearbox	20	
Ret	26	(France) Jacques Laffite	Ligier-Matra	19	Handling	21	
Ret	14	(Switzerland) Marc Surer	Ensign-Ford	14	Engine	16	
Ret	20	(Finland) Keke Rosberg	Fittipaldi-Ford	4	Fuel System	8	
Ret	12	(United Kingdom) Nigel Mansell	Lotus-Ford	3	Engine	15	
Ret	28	(France) Didier Pironi	Ferrari	3	Engine	12	
Ret	3	(United States) Eddie Cheever	Tyrrell-Ford	1	Clutch	13	
DNQ	31	(Argentina) Miguel Ángel Guerra	Osella-Ford				
DNQ	32	(Italy) Beppe Gabbiani	Osella-Ford				
DNQ	17	(Republic of Ireland) Derek Daly	March-Ford				
DNQ	25	(France) Jean-Pierre Jabouille	Ligier-Matra				
DNQ	18	(Chile) Eliseo Salazar	March-Ford				

== Notes ==
- This was the 5th Grand Slam for Brabham.
- This was the 400th and 401st podium finish for a Ford-powered car.
- This was Alain Prost's first ever podium finish.

== Championship standings after the race ==
Drivers' Championship standings

Pos	Driver	Points
1	(Argentina) Carlos Reutemann	21
2	(Australia) Alan Jones	18
3	(Brazil) Nelson Piquet	13
4	(Italy) Riccardo Patrese	4
5	(France) Alain Prost	4

Constructors' Championship standings

Pos	Constructor	Points
1	(United Kingdom) Williams-Ford	39
2	(United Kingdom) Brabham-Ford	13
3	(France) Renault	6
4	(United Kingdom) Arrows-Ford	4
5	(Italy) Alfa Romeo	3

- Note: Only the top five positions are included for both sets of standings.

Previous race: 1981 Brazilian Grand Prix	FIA Formula One World Championship; 1981 season	Next race: 1981 San Marino Grand Prix
Previous race: 1980 Argentine Grand Prix	Argentine Grand Prix	Next race: 1995 Argentine Grand Prix
