= 1981 Brazilian Grand Prix =

- Race 2 of 15 in the 1981 Formula One World Championship
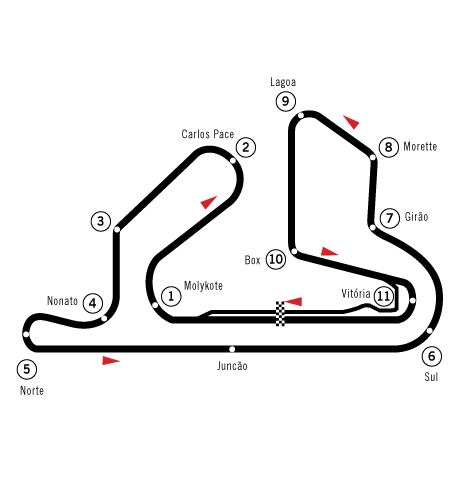

Race details
- Date: March 29, 1981
- Official name: X Grande Prêmio do Brasil
- Location: Jacarepaguá Circuit; Jacarepaguá, Rio de Janeiro
- Course: Permanent racing facility
- Course length: 5.031 km (3.126 miles)
- Distance: 62 laps, 311.922 km (193.819 miles)
- Scheduled distance: 63 laps, 316.953 km (196.945 miles)
- Weather: Overcast, Fresh, Rain

Pole position
Driver	(Brazil) Nelson Piquet	Brabham-Ford
- Time: 1:35.079

Fastest lap
Driver	(Switzerland) Marc Surer	Ensign-Ford
- Time: 1:54.302 on lap 26

Podium
First	(Argentina) Carlos Reutemann	Williams-Ford
Second	(Australia) Alan Jones	Williams-Ford
Third	(Italy) Riccardo Patrese	Arrows-Ford

The 1981 Brazilian Grand Prix was the second race of the 1981 Formula One World Championship and was held on 29 March 1981 at Jacarepaguá in Rio de Janeiro, Brazil. Formula One moved to the Jacarepaguá circuit in Rio de Janeiro from the Interlagos circuit in São Paulo, after safety concerns with the long Interlagos circuit and the growing slums of São Paulo being at odds with the glamorous image of Formula One.

The Argentine driver Carlos Reutemann won the race in contentious circumstances; he ignored his pit signals to give up the lead to his teammate and team leader Alan Jones. Jones, who finished second, did not show up on the podium afterwards.

== Classification ==
=== Qualifying ===
Pos	No	Driver	Constructor	Q1	Q2	Gap
1	5	(Brazil) Nelson Piquet	Brabham-Ford	1:35.786	1:35.079	—
2	2	(Argentina) Carlos Reutemann	Williams-Ford	1:35.390	1:36.000	+0.311
3	1	(Australia) Alan Jones	Williams-Ford	1:36.337	1:36.690	+1.258
4	29	(Italy) Riccardo Patrese	Arrows-Ford	1:37.231	1:36.667	+1.588
5	15	(France) Alain Prost	Renault	1:37.147	1:36.670	+1.591
6	23	(Italy) Bruno Giacomelli	Alfa Romeo	1:38.682	1:37.283	+2.204
7	27	(Canada) Gilles Villeneuve	Ferrari	1:37.975	1:37.497	+2.418
8	16	(France) René Arnoux	Renault	1:38.985	1:37.561	+2.482
9	22	(United States) Mario Andretti	Alfa Romeo	1:37.933	1:37.597	+2.518
10	11	(Italy) Elio de Angelis	Lotus-Ford	1:38.352	1:37.734	+2.655
11	6	(Mexico) Héctor Rebaque	Brabham-Ford	1:38.225	1:37.777	+2.698
12	20	(Finland) Keke Rosberg	Fittipaldi-Ford	1:37.981	1:39.371	+2.902
13	12	(United Kingdom) Nigel Mansell	Lotus-Ford	1:38.861	1:38.003	+2.924
14	3	(United States) Eddie Cheever	Tyrrell-Ford	1:38.160	1:38.521	+3.081
15	7	(United Kingdom) John Watson	McLaren-Ford	1:40.057	1:38.263	+3.184
16	26	(France) Jacques Laffite	Ligier-Matra	1:38.273	1:38.713	+3.194
17	28	(France) Didier Pironi	Ferrari	1:39.229	1:38.565	+3.486
18	14	(Switzerland) Marc Surer	Ensign-Ford	1:39.296	1:38.570	+3.491
19	33	(France) Patrick Tambay	Theodore-Ford	1:38.726	1:39.668	+3.647
20	8	(Italy) Andrea de Cesaris	McLaren-Ford	1:39.409	1:38.780	+3.701
21	30	(Italy) Siegfried Stohr	Arrows-Ford	1:40.297	1:39.190	+4.111
22	21	(Brazil) Chico Serra	Fittipaldi-Ford	1:39.326	1:39.396	+4.247
23	25	(France) Jean-Pierre Jarier	Ligier-Matra	—	1:39.398	+4.319
24	4	(Argentina) Ricardo Zunino	Tyrrell-Ford	1:41.036	1:39.798	+4.719
25	9	(Netherlands) Jan Lammers	ATS-Ford	1:40.339	1:39.844	+4.765
26	25	(France) Jean-Pierre Jabouille	Ligier-Matra	1:40.306	withdrew	+5.227
27	32	(Italy) Beppe Gabbiani	Osella-Ford	1:41.954	1:40.709	+5.630
28	31	(Argentina) Miguel Angel Guerra	Osella-Ford	1:40.984	1:44.482	+5.905
29	18	(Chile) Eliseo Salazar	March-Ford	1:44.730	1:43.267	+8.188
30	17	(Republic of Ireland) Derek Daly	March-Ford	no time	no time	—

=== Race ===
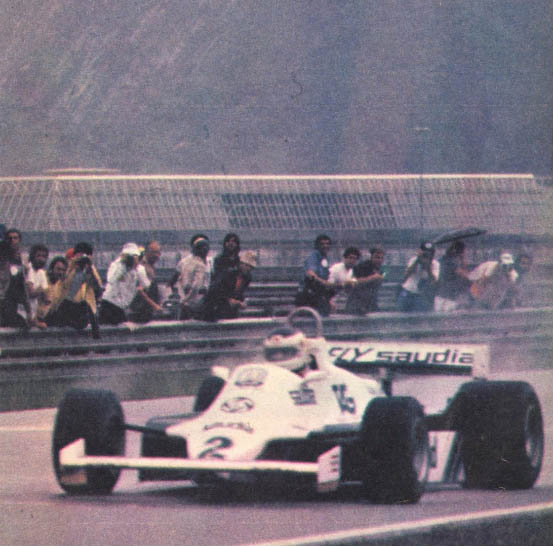
Carlos Reutemann, winner

Pos	No	Driver	Constructor	Laps	Time/Retired	Grid	Points
1	2	(Argentina) Carlos Reutemann	Williams-Ford	62	2:00:23.66	2	9
2	1	(Australia) Alan Jones	Williams-Ford	62	+ 4.44	3	6
3	29	(Italy) Riccardo Patrese	Arrows-Ford	62	+ 1:03.08	4	4
4	14	(Switzerland) Marc Surer	Ensign-Ford	62	+ 1:17.03	18	3
5	11	(Italy) Elio de Angelis	Lotus-Ford	62	+ 1:26.42	10	2
6	26	(France) Jacques Laffite	Ligier-Matra	62	+ 1:26.83	16	1
7	25	(France) Jean-Pierre Jarier	Ligier-Matra	62	+ 1:30.25	23	
8	7	(United Kingdom) John Watson	McLaren-Ford	61	+ 1 lap	15	
9	20	(Finland) Keke Rosberg	Fittipaldi-Ford	61	+ 1 lap	12	
10	33	(France) Patrick Tambay	Theodore-Ford	61	+ 1 lap	19	
11	12	(United Kingdom) Nigel Mansell	Lotus-Ford	61	+ 1 lap	13	
12	5	(Brazil) Nelson Piquet	Brabham-Ford	60	+ 2 laps	1	
13	4	(Argentina) Ricardo Zunino	Tyrrell-Ford	57	+ 5 laps	24	
NC	3	(United States) Eddie Cheever	Tyrrell-Ford	49	+ 13 laps	14	
NC	23	(Italy) Bruno Giacomelli	Alfa Romeo	40	+ 22 laps	6	
Ret	27	(Canada) Gilles Villeneuve	Ferrari	25	Turbo	7	
Ret	6	(Mexico) Héctor Rebaque	Brabham-Ford	22	Spun off	11	
Ret	15	(France) Alain Prost	Renault	20	Collision	5	
Ret	30	(Italy) Siegfried Stohr	Arrows-Ford	20	Accident	21	
Ret	28	(France) Didier Pironi	Ferrari	19	Collision	17	
Ret	8	(Italy) Andrea de Cesaris	McLaren-Ford	9	Engine	20	
Ret	16	(France) René Arnoux	Renault	0	Collision	8	
Ret	22	(United States) Mario Andretti	Alfa Romeo	0	Collision	9	
Ret	21	(Brazil) Chico Serra	Fittipaldi-Ford	0	Collision	22	
DNQ	9	(Netherlands) Jan Lammers	ATS-Ford				
DNQ	32	(Italy) Beppe Gabbiani	Osella-Ford				
DNQ	31	(Argentina) Miguel Angel Guerra	Osella-Ford				
DNQ	18	(Chile) Eliseo Salazar	March-Ford				
DNQ	17	(Republic of Ireland) Derek Daly	March-Ford				
DNP	14	(Colombia) Ricardo Londoño	Ensign-Ford		Car raced by Surer		

Colombian driver Ricardo Londoño was denied a superlicense, was not allowed to participate in official practice, and unable to race.

== Notes ==
- This was the 10th pole position for a Brazilian driver.
- This was the 3rd Brazilian Grand Prix win for Carlos Reutemann, breaking the previous record set by Emerson Fittipaldi at the 1974 Brazilian Grand Prix.
- This race marked the 1st fastest lap set by Ensign.
- This was the 200th Grand Prix start for a Ford-powered car. In those 200 races, Ford-powered cars had won 138 Grands Prix, achieved 399 podium finishes, 124 pole positions, 122 fastest laps, 19 Grand Slams and had won 10 Driver's and 9 Constructor's Championships.
- This was the 5th Brazilian Grand Prix win for a Ford-powered car.

== Championship standings after the race ==
Drivers' Championship standings

	Pos	Driver	Points
	1	(Australia) Alan Jones	15
	2	(Argentina) Carlos Reutemann	15
	3	(Brazil) Nelson Piquet	4
13	4	(Italy) Riccardo Patrese	4
1	5	(United States) Mario Andretti	3

Constructors' Championship standings

	Pos	Constructor	Points
	1	(United Kingdom) Williams-Ford	30
	2	(United Kingdom) Brabham-Ford	4
9	3	(United Kingdom) Arrows-Ford	4
1	4	(Italy) Alfa Romeo	3
3	5	(United Kingdom) Ensign-Ford	3

- Note: Only the top five positions are included for both sets of standings.

Previous race: 1981 United States Grand Prix West	FIA Formula One World Championship; 1981 season	Next race: 1981 Argentine Grand Prix
Previous race: 1980 Brazilian Grand Prix	Brazilian Grand Prix	Next race: 1982 Brazilian Grand Prix
