= 1976 Griffin Golden Helmet Trophy =

The 1976 Griffin Golden Helmet Trophy was a non-championship Formula Three race, held at the Mallory Park circuit, in Leicestershire, England, on 26 September. The race saw Stephen South score his first International race victory.

== Report ==
=== Entry ===
A total of 26 F3 cars were entered for the event, however of those, only seventeen took part in qualifying and race. Of the nine, who were entered, but did not arrive included the BARC BP Super Visco British F3 Champion, Rupert Keegan.

=== Qualifying ===
Stephen South took pole position, ahead of Brazilian Paulo Gomes. Another Brazilian, Aryon Cornelsen-Filho took third with Geoff Lees completing the second row of the grid.

=== Race ===
After 18 laps of the Mallory Park circuit, South took the chequered flag, in a time of 13:35.4 mins., averaging a speed of 107.28 mph. Second place went to Lees, who was just 1.4secs behind. Gomes was a little further adrift in third, completed the podium.

== Classification ==
=== Race ===
Pos.	No.	Driver	Entrant	Car - Engine	Time, Laps	Reason Out
1st	1	(United Kingdom) Stephen South	Dortmunder Union Bier/Bogarts of Birmingham	March-Toyota 763	13:35.4	
2nd	18	(United Kingdom) Geoff Lees	Rob Roy Racing with D.J. Bond	Chevron-Toyota B34	13:36.8	
3rd	25	(Brazil) Paulo Gomes	Team Modus Ltd	Modus-Toyota M1	13:43.2	
4th	11	(Australia) Geoff Brabham	Brabham Racing Organisation	Ralt-Toyota RT1/76	13:44.6	
5th	29	(Brazil) Aryon Cornelsen-Filho	March Racing Ltd	March-Toyota 763	13:45.4	
6th	28	(Netherlands) Boy Hayje	F & S Properties	Ralt-Toyota RT1/76	13:46.4	
7th	30	(United Kingdom) Barrie Maskell	Jeff Sharpe	Dastle-Ford Mk 10B (or Mk 12)		
8th	6	(Australia) Paul Bernasconi	Paul Bernasconi	Ralt-Toyota RT1/76		
9th	26	(United Kingdom) Tim Keen	Team Modus Ltd	Modus-Toyota M1		
10th	22	(Belgium) Pierre Dieudonné	Dr. Joseph Ehrlich	Ehrlich-Toyota ES5/6		
DNF	16	(United Kingdom) John Lain	Imado Watch Company Ltd	Modus-Ford M1		
DNF	8	(Sweden) Torsten Palm		Ralt-Toyota RT1/76		
DNF	27	(United Kingdom) Bruce Coate-Bond	Waves (Car Displays)	March-Toyota 753		
DNF	20	(United Kingdom) Roger Andreason		GRD-GRD 374		
DNF	2	(Switzerland) Giordano Regazzoni		March-Toyota 753		
DNF	21	(Spain) Luis de Almenara	Ray Race International	Ray-Toyota 376		
DNF	5	(United Kingdom) Tony Dron		March-Toyota 763		

- Fastest lap: Stephen South & Geoff Lees, 44.6secs.
