= 1981 San Marino Grand Prix =

- Race 4 of 15 in the 1981 Formula One World Championship
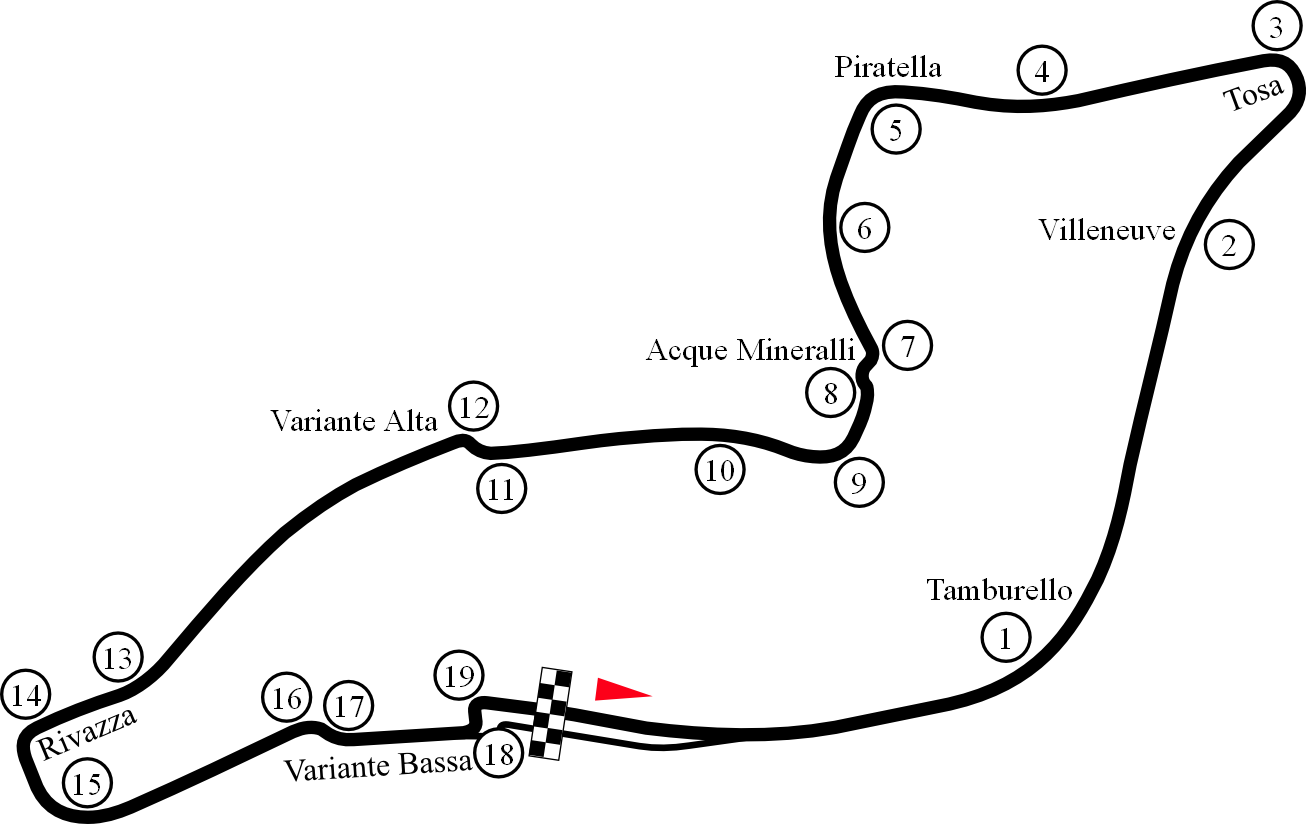

Race details
- Date: 3 May 1981
- Official name: 1º Gran Premio di San Marino
- Location: Autodromo Dino Ferrari, Imola, Emilia-Romagna, Italy
- Course: Permanent racing facility
- Course length: 5.040 km (3.132 miles)
- Distance: 60 laps, 302.400 km (187.902 miles)
- Weather: Rain, cold

Pole position
Driver	(Canada) Gilles Villeneuve	Ferrari
- Time: 1:34.523

Fastest lap
Driver	(Canada) Gilles Villeneuve	Ferrari
- Time: 1:48.064 on lap 46

Podium
First	(Brazil) Nelson Piquet	Brabham-Ford
Second	(Italy) Riccardo Patrese	Arrows-Ford
Third	(Argentina) Carlos Reutemann	Williams-Ford

The 1981 San Marino Grand Prix was a Formula One motor race held at Imola on 3 May 1981. It was the fourth race of the 1981 Formula One World Championship.

The race was the first to bear the title "San Marino Grand Prix", although the Imola circuit is in Italy and several non-championship Formula One races and the 1980 Italian Grand Prix had previously been held at the circuit. The Acque-Minerali chicane had been widened from the year before and was faster; the chicane in its original narrow configuration in 1980 was unpopular with drivers because it was very slow.

The Lotus team withdrew their entries because the FIA upheld the ban on the Lotus 88 and team owner Colin Chapman felt the 81s were no longer competitive.

Gilles Villeneuve took the early lead until an ill-fated pit stop for slick tyres, whereafter Didier Pironi held the lead until late in the race and was passed by Nelson Piquet, who eventually won the race. As well as being Michele Alboreto's Grand Prix debut, the race is also notable for the recovery of Gilles Villeneuve to seventh place, after misjudgement of tyre selection for the conditions. While the team did not qualify for the race, it was the first race entered by Toleman, which is now Alpine F1 Team.

== Classification ==
=== Qualifying ===
Pos	No	Driver	Constructor	Q1	Q2	Gap
1	27	(Canada) Gilles Villeneuve	Ferrari	1:35.576	1:34.523	—
2	2	(Argentina) Carlos Reutemann	Williams-Ford	1:35.844	1:35.229	+0.706
3	16	(France) René Arnoux	Renault	1:35.281	1:35.292	+0.758
4	15	(France) Alain Prost	Renault	1:35.579	3:58.089	+1.056
5	5	(Brazil) Nelson Piquet	Brabham-Ford	1:37.417	1:35.733	+1.210
6	28	(France) Didier Pironi	Ferrari	1:36.168	1:35.868	+1.345
7	7	(United Kingdom) John Watson	McLaren-Ford	1:37.639	1:36.241	+1.718
8	1	(Australia) Alan Jones	Williams-Ford	1:36.280	1:36.317	+1.757
9	29	(Italy) Riccardo Patrese	Arrows-Ford	1:37.061	1:36.390	+1.867
10	26	(France) Jacques Laffite	Ligier-Matra	1:38.908	1:36.477	+1.954
11	23	(Italy) Bruno Giacomelli	Alfa Romeo	1:39.372	1:36.776	+2.253
12	22	(United States) Mario Andretti	Alfa Romeo	1:37.587	1:36.919	+2.396
13	6	(Mexico) Héctor Rebaque	Brabham-Ford	1:38.822	1:37.264	+2.741
14	8	(Italy) Andrea de Cesaris	McLaren-Ford	1:38.019	1:37.382	+2.859
15	20	(Finland) Keke Rosberg	Fittipaldi-Ford	1:37.459	1:37.906	+2.936
16	33	(France) Patrick Tambay	Theodore-Ford	1:39.215	1:37.545	+3.022
17	4	(Italy) Michele Alboreto	Tyrrell-Ford	1:39.341	1:37.771	+3.248
18	25	(France) Jean-Pierre Jabouille	Ligier-Matra	1:38.140	1:38.702	+3.617
19	3	(United States) Eddie Cheever	Tyrrell-Ford	1:38.369	1:38.266	+3.743
20	32	(Italy) Beppe Gabbiani	Osella-Ford	1:39.245	1:38.302	+3.779
21	14	(Switzerland) Marc Surer	Ensign-Ford	1:38.341	1:38.488	+3.818
22	31	(Argentina) Miguel Angel Guerra	Osella-Ford	1:39.799	1:38.773	+4.250
23	18	(Chile) Eliseo Salazar	March-Ford	1:39.161	1:38.827	+4.304
24	10	(Sweden) Slim Borgudd	ATS-Ford	1:41.196	1:39.079	+4.556
25	30	(Italy) Siegfried Stohr	Arrows-Ford	1:39.112	1:39.553	+4.589
26	17	(Republic of Ireland) Derek Daly	March-Ford	1:39.453	1:39.157	+4.634
27	9	(Netherlands) Jan Lammers	ATS-Ford	1:40.872	1:39.419	+4.896
28	21	(Brazil) Chico Serra	Fittipaldi-Ford	1:51.453	1:41.114	+6.591
29	36	(United Kingdom) Derek Warwick	Toleman-Hart	1:54.020	1:43.187	+8.664
30	35	(United Kingdom) Brian Henton	Toleman-Hart	1:49.951	no time	+15.428
WD	11	(Italy) Elio de Angelis	Lotus-Ford	—	—	—
WD	12	(United Kingdom) Nigel Mansell	Lotus-Ford	—	—	—

=== Race ===
Pos	No	Driver	Constructor	Tyre	Laps	Time/Retired	Grid	Points
1	5	(Brazil) Nelson Piquet	Brabham-Ford	MI	60	1:51:23.97	5	9
2	29	(Italy) Riccardo Patrese	Arrows-Ford	MI	60	+ 4.58	9	6
3	2	(Argentina) Carlos Reutemann	Williams-Ford	MI	60	+ 6.34	2	4
4	6	(Mexico) Héctor Rebaque	Brabham-Ford	MI	60	+ 22.89	13	3
5	28	(France) Didier Pironi	Ferrari	MI	60	+ 25.87	6	2
6	8	(Italy) Andrea de Cesaris	McLaren-Ford	MI	60	+ 1:06.61	14	1
7	27	(Canada) Gilles Villeneuve	Ferrari	MI	60	+ 1:41.97	1	
8	16	(France) René Arnoux	Renault	MI	59	+ 1 Lap	3	
9	14	(Switzerland) Marc Surer	Ensign-Ford	MI	59	+ 1 Lap	21	
10	7	(United Kingdom) John Watson	McLaren-Ford	MI	58	+ 2 Laps	7	
11	33	(France) Patrick Tambay	Theodore-Ford	MI	58	+ 2 Laps	16	
12	1	(Australia) Alan Jones	Williams-Ford	MI	58	+ 2 Laps	8	
13	10	(Sweden) Slim Borgudd	ATS-Ford	MI	57	+3 Laps	24	
NC	25	(France) Jean-Pierre Jabouille	Ligier-Matra	MI	45	Not Classified	18	
Ret	17	(Chile) Eliseo Salazar	March-Ford	MI	38	Spun Off	23	
Ret	4	(Italy) Michele Alboreto	Tyrrell-Ford	MI	31	Collision	17	
Ret	32	(Italy) Beppe Gabbiani	Osella-Ford	MI	31	Collision	20	
Ret	23	(Italy) Bruno Giacomelli	Alfa Romeo	MI	28	Collision	11	
Ret	3	(United States) Eddie Cheever	Tyrrell-Ford	MI	28	Collision	19	
Ret	22	(United States) Mario Andretti	Alfa Romeo	MI	26	Gearbox	12	
Ret	20	(Finland) Keke Rosberg	Fittipaldi-Ford	A	14	Engine	15	
Ret	26	(France) Jacques Laffite	Ligier-Matra	MI	7	Suspension	10	
Ret	15	(France) Alain Prost	Renault	MI	3	Gearbox	4	
Ret	31	(Argentina) Miguel Angel Guerra	Osella-Ford	MI	0	Accident	22	
DNQ	30	(Italy) Siegfried Stohr	Arrows-Ford	MI				
DNQ	18	(Republic of Ireland) Derek Daly	March-Ford	MI				
DNQ	9	(Netherlands) Jan Lammers	ATS-Ford	MI				
DNQ	21	(Brazil) Chico Serra	Fittipaldi-Ford	A				
DNQ	36	(United Kingdom) Derek Warwick	Toleman-Hart	P				
DNQ	35	(United Kingdom) Brian Henton	Toleman-Hart	P				
WD	11	(Italy) Elio de Angelis	Lotus-Ford	MI				
WD	12	(United Kingdom) Nigel Mansell	Lotus-Ford	MI				

== Notes ==
- This was the Formula One World Championship debut for Swedish driver Slim Borgudd, British driver Derek Warwick and Italian driver and future Grand Prix winner Michele Alboreto.
- This was the 250th Grand Prix in which an Australian driver participated. Only British, American, French and Italian drivers had participated in more Formula One World Championship Grands Prix.
- This race marked the 50th podium finish for a Brazilian driver.
- This was the Formula One World Championship debut for British constructor Toleman. It was also the 5th Grand Prix start for Theodore and the 50th Grand Prix start for Renault and a Renault-powered engine.
- This race marked the 25th Grand Prix win for Brabham.
- This was the Formula One World Championship debut for British engine supplier Hart.

== Championship standings after the race ==
Drivers' Championship standings

Pos	Driver	Points
1	(Argentina) Carlos Reutemann	25
2	(Brazil) Nelson Piquet	22
3	(Australia) Alan Jones	18
4	(Italy) Riccardo Patrese	10
5	(France) Alain Prost	4

Constructors' Championship standings

Pos	Constructor	Points
1	(United Kingdom) Williams-Ford	43
2	(United Kingdom) Brabham-Ford	25
3	(United Kingdom) Arrows-Ford	10
4	(France) Renault	6
5	(Italy) Alfa Romeo	3

- Note: Only the top five positions are included for both sets of standings.

Previous race: 1981 Argentine Grand Prix	FIA Formula One World Championship; 1981 season	Next race: 1981 Belgian Grand Prix
Previous race: None; Previous race at Imola: 1980 Italian Grand Prix	San Marino Grand Prix	Next race: 1982 San Marino Grand Prix
