= 1981 Monaco Grand Prix =

Coordinates: 43°44′4.74″N 7°25′16.8″E

- Race 6 of 15 in the 1981 Formula One World Championship
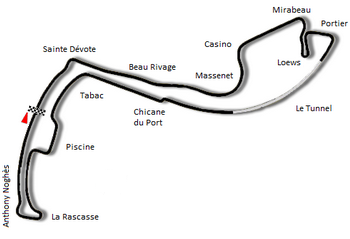

Race details
- Date: 31 May 1981
- Location: Circuit de Monaco
- Course: Street circuit
- Course length: 3.312 km (2.057 miles)
- Distance: 76 laps, 251.712 km (156.406 miles)
- Weather: Dry

Pole position
Driver	(Brazil) Nelson Piquet	Brabham-Ford
- Time: 1:25.710

Fastest lap
Driver	(Australia) Alan Jones	Williams-Ford
- Time: 1:27.47 on lap 48

Podium
First	(Canada) Gilles Villeneuve	Ferrari
Second	(Australia) Alan Jones	Williams-Ford
Third	(France) Jacques Laffite	Ligier-Matra

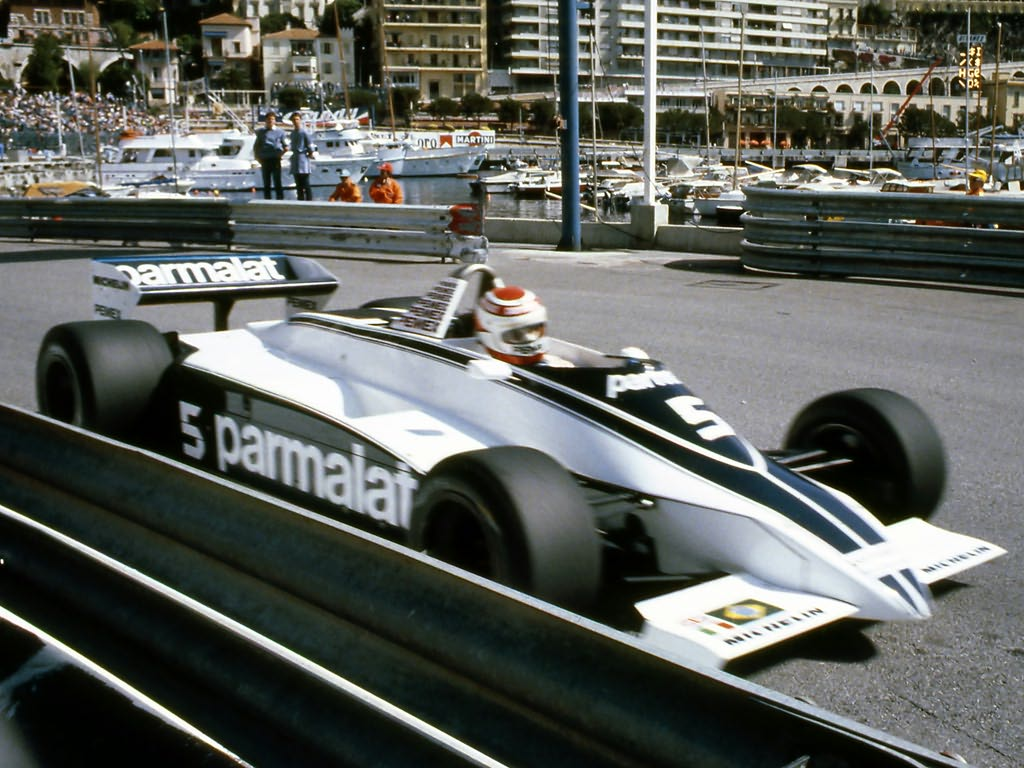
Nelson Piquet in a Brabham BT49C

The 1981 Monaco Grand Prix was a Formula One motor race held at Monaco on 31 May 1981. It was the sixth race of the 1981 Formula One World Championship.

The 76-lap race was won by Canadian driver Gilles Villeneuve, driving a Ferrari. Brazilian Nelson Piquet took pole position in his Brabham-Ford and led until he crashed out on lap 54. Australian Alan Jones finished second in a Williams-Ford, with Frenchman Jacques Laffite third in a Ligier-Matra.

== Race ==
=== Delay ===
The race was due to start at 3:30pm Central European Time (UTC+1) but was delayed after a fire in the Loews Hotel kitchens, which necessitated the fire service pumping large quantities of water to put the fires out. Water then seeped through the floors of the hotel and into the tunnel. The race got started at 4:30pm, Nelson Piquet led for much of the race, but crashed out late on. New race leader Alan Jones then suffered a fuel feed problem in the latter stages of the race, allowing Gilles Villeneuve in his Ferrari, to take his first victory since 1979 as well as becoming the first, and to this day, the only Canadian to win in Monaco. Championship leader Carlos Reutemann retired with gearbox problems, breaking a 15-race streak of consistently finishing in the points.

== Classification ==
=== Pre-qualifying ===
Pos	No	Driver	Constructor	Time	Gap
1	33	(France) Patrick Tambay	Theodore-Ford	1:30.492	
2	14	(Switzerland) Marc Surer	Ensign-Ford	1:31.249	+0.757
3	31	(Italy) Beppe Gabbiani	Osella-Ford	1:32.704	+2.212
4	32	(Italy) Piercarlo Ghinzani	Osella-Ford	1:33.189	+2.697
5	10	(Sweden) Slim Borgudd	ATS-Ford	1:33.285	+2.793
6	18	(Republic of Ireland) Derek Daly	March-Ford	1:33.800	+3.308
7	17	(Chile) Eliseo Salazar	March-Ford	1:35.249	+4.757
8	35	(United Kingdom) Brian Henton	Toleman-Hart	1:37.528	+7.036
9	36	(United Kingdom) Derek Warwick	Toleman-Hart	1:41.966	+11.474

=== Qualifying ===
Pos	No	Driver	Constructor	Q1	Q2	Gap
1	5	(Brazil) Nelson Piquet	Brabham-Ford	1:25.710	1:28.667	
2	27	(Canada) Gilles Villeneuve	Ferrari	1:26.891	1:25.788	+0.078
3	12	(United Kingdom) Nigel Mansell	Lotus-Ford	1:27.174	1:25.815	+0.105
4	2	(Argentina) Carlos Reutemann	Williams-Ford	1:27.643	1:26.010	+0.300
5	29	(Italy) Riccardo Patrese	Arrows-Ford	1:27.447	1:26.040	+0.330
6	11	(Italy) Elio de Angelis	Lotus-Ford	1:28.381	1:26.259	+0.549
7	1	(Australia) Alan Jones	Williams-Ford	1:26.938	1:26.538	+0.828
8	26	(France) Jacques Laffite	Ligier-Matra	1:27.468	1:26.704	+0.994
9	15	(France) Alain Prost	Renault	1:27.623	1:26.953	+1.243
10	7	(United Kingdom) John Watson	McLaren-Ford	1:28.137	1:27.058	+1.348
11	8	(Italy) Andrea de Cesaris	McLaren-Ford	1:28.966	1:27.122	+1.412
12	22	(United States) Mario Andretti	Alfa Romeo	1:27.512	1:28.162	+1.802
13	16	(France) René Arnoux	Renault	1:28.613	1:27.513	+1.803
14	30	(Italy) Siegfried Stohr	Arrows-Ford	1:29.789	1:27.564	+1.854
15	3	(United States) Eddie Cheever	Tyrrell-Ford	1:29.282	1:27.594	+1.884
16	33	(France) Patrick Tambay	Theodore-Ford	1:28.897	1:27.939	+2.229
17	28	(France) Didier Pironi	Ferrari	1:29.150	1:28.266	+2.556
18	23	(Italy) Bruno Giacomelli	Alfa Romeo	1:28.335	1:28.323	+2.613
19	14	(Switzerland) Marc Surer	Ensign-Ford	1:29.611	1:28.339	+2.629
20	4	(Italy) Michele Alboreto	Tyrrell-Ford	1:30.699	1:28.358	+2.648
21	20	(Finland) Keke Rosberg	Fittipaldi-Ford	1:29.924	1:28.436	+2.726
22	25	(France) Jean-Pierre Jabouille	Ligier-Matra	1:29.752	1:28.841	+3.131
23	6	(Mexico) Héctor Rebaque	Brabham-Ford	1:29.188	1:29.256	+3.478
24	21	(Brazil) Chico Serra	Fittipaldi-Ford	1:32.109	1:29.434	+3.724
25	32	(Italy) Piercarlo Ghinzani	Osella-Ford	no time	1:29.694	+3.984
26	31	(Italy) Beppe Gabbiani	Osella-Ford	1:30.963	1:29.795	+4.085

=== Race ===
Pos	No	Driver	Constructor	Tyre	Laps	Time/Retired	Grid	Points
1	27	(Canada) Gilles Villeneuve	Ferrari	MI	76	1:54:23.38	2	9
2	1	(Australia) Alan Jones	Williams-Ford	MI	76	+ 39.91	7	6
3	26	(France) Jacques Laffite	Ligier-Matra	MI	76	+ 1:29.24	8	4
4	28	(France) Didier Pironi	Ferrari	MI	75	+ 1 Lap	17	3
5	3	(United States) Eddie Cheever	Tyrrell-Ford	MI	74	+ 2 Laps	15	2
6	14	(Switzerland) Marc Surer	Ensign-Ford	MI	74	+ 2 Laps	19	1
7	33	(France) Patrick Tambay	Theodore-Ford	MI	72	+ 4 Laps	16	
Ret	5	(Brazil) Nelson Piquet	Brabham-Ford	MI	53	Spun off	1	
Ret	7	(United Kingdom) John Watson	McLaren-Ford	MI	52	Engine	10	
Ret	4	(Italy) Michele Alboreto	Tyrrell-Ford	MI	50	Collision	20	
Ret	23	(Italy) Bruno Giacomelli	Alfa Romeo	MI	50	Collision	18	
Ret	15	(France) Alain Prost	Renault	MI	45	Engine	9	
Ret	2	(Argentina) Carlos Reutemann	Williams-Ford	MI	33	Gearbox	4	
Ret	11	(Italy) Elio de Angelis	Lotus-Ford	MI	32	Engine	6	
Ret	16	(France) René Arnoux	Renault	MI	32	Spun off	13	
Ret	29	(Italy) Riccardo Patrese	Arrows-Ford	MI	29	Gearbox	5	
Ret	12	(United Kingdom) Nigel Mansell	Lotus-Ford	MI	15	Suspension	3	
Ret	30	(Italy) Siegfried Stohr	Arrows-Ford	MI	14	Fuel system	14	
Ret	8	(Italy) Andrea de Cesaris	McLaren-Ford	MI	0	Collision	11	
Ret	22	(United States) Mario Andretti	Alfa Romeo	MI	0	Collision	12	
DNQ	20	(Finland) Keke Rosberg	Fittipaldi-Ford	A				
DNQ	25	(France) Jean-Pierre Jabouille	Ligier-Matra	MI				
DNQ	6	(Mexico) Héctor Rebaque	Brabham-Ford	MI				
DNQ	21	(Brazil) Chico Serra	Fittipaldi-Ford	A				
DNQ	32	(Italy) Piercarlo Ghinzani	Osella-Ford	MI				
DNQ	31	(Italy) Beppe Gabbiani	Osella-Ford	MI				
DNPQ	10	(Sweden) Slim Borgudd	ATS-Ford	MI				
DNPQ	18	(Republic of Ireland) Derek Daly	March-Ford	MI				
DNPQ	17	(Chile) Eliseo Salazar	March-Ford	MI				
DNPQ	35	(United Kingdom) Brian Henton	Toleman-Hart	P				
DNPQ	36	(United Kingdom) Derek Warwick	Toleman-Hart	P				

== Notes ==
- This was the 5th Grand Prix win and the 10th podium finish for a Canadian driver.
- This was the 50th Grand Prix start for Arrows.
- This was the 25th pole position for Brabham.

== Championship standings after the race ==
Drivers' Championship standings

Pos	Driver	Points
1	(Argentina) Carlos Reutemann	34
2	(Australia) Alan Jones	24
3	(Brazil) Nelson Piquet	22
4	(Canada) Gilles Villeneuve	12
5	(France) Jacques Laffite	11

Constructors' Championship standings

Pos	Constructor	Points
1	(United Kingdom) Williams-Ford	58
2	(United Kingdom) Brabham-Ford	25
3	(Italy) Ferrari	17
4	(France) Ligier-Matra	11
5	(United Kingdom) Arrows-Ford	10

- Note: Only the top five positions are included for both sets of standings.

Previous race: 1981 Belgian Grand Prix	FIA Formula One World Championship; 1981 season	Next race: 1981 Spanish Grand Prix
Previous race: 1980 Monaco Grand Prix	Monaco Grand Prix	Next race: 1982 Monaco Grand Prix
