= Stephen South =

British racing driver (born 1952)

- Born: 19 February 1952 (age 74); Harrow, Middlesex, England

Formula One World Championship career
- Nationality: (United Kingdom) British
- Active years: 1980
- Team: McLaren
- Entries: 1 (0 starts)
- Championships: 0
- Wins: 0
- Podiums: 0
- Career points: 0
- Pole positions: 0
- Fastest laps: 0
- First entry: 1980 United States Grand Prix West

Stephen South (born 19 February 1952) is a British former racing driver from England.

South is chiefly known for winning the 1977 BRDC Vandervell British F3 Championship. His only Formula One entry was at the 1980 United States Grand Prix West with McLaren standing in for Alain Prost who was injured, but South failed to qualify. His career was ended later that year when part of one leg was amputated after an accident during practice for a Can-Am race at the Circuit Trois-Rivières in Quebec, Canada.

== Career ==
South was educated at Harrow County School for Boys. A former English Kart Champion, was the star during his early years in Formula Ford. In his first year of Formula Ford, South was 1973's big find, winning five races on his way to finishing third in the Wella for Men Championship and fourth in the BOC series, driving Rayrace International's Ray 73F. This success continued into 1974, where he won 11 races and took second place in the BOC championship, again for Rayrace, using their Ray 74F car.

For 1975, the Rayrace team moved up into Formula Three, taking South with them. Despite a promising start, with third place at Aintree, two fifth place at Brands Hatch and again at Croix-en-Ternois in France, their Ray RB3 75, was not competitive, so they changed the car to a March 753. By the end of the season, South was back on the podium at Thruxton, at the final race of the season.

For South's second season of Formula Three, he was entered by Dortmunder Union Bier/Bogarts of Birmingham. Driving a March 753 initially, switching to a March 763 later in the season, South's results began to improve, starting with two second places at Thruxton, in his first three races of the season. The world took notice of South, when he finished third in the Monaco Grand Prix Formula 3 race. That maiden first F3 win finally arrived at a non-championship event at Mallory Park, with South victorious in the Griffin Golden Helmet Trophy race.

1977 saw South remain in Formula Three for a third season, switching to Team BP's March 763. This proved to be a wise move, with him winning the opening races of both the BRDC Vandervell British F3 Championship and the BARC BP Super Visco British F3 Championship at Silverstone and Thruxton, respectively. Before the end of the season South picked up another four victories at Brands Hatch (Indy circuit) twice, Snetterton and Mallory Park. These wins and eight more trips to the podium, took South to the BRDC Vandervell British F3 Championship title, and second place BARC BP Super Visco British F3 Championship behind Derek Daly. But for an accident between the pair wrecking South's March 763 at Silverstone, he may have taken both titles. This led to an opportunity to race in the JAF Grand Prix. In his first Formula Two event, South finished seventh.

1978 saw South race only six times every time in F2 machinery, with a best finish of fourth place in the European Formula Two event at Hockenheim. It was enough for Ron Dennis's Project Four team to sign him for the whole season. He repaid the faith with two poles and a win in the Rhein-Pokalrennen, held at Hockenheim. His sixth place in the final standings, meant South's Grand Prix future was the topic of conversation.

South's chance for glory in the world's major category came when he substituted for Alain Prost at Marlboro Team McLaren. Although South was set to take a drive with Toleman Group Motorsport in F2, he opted for the McLaren in the United States GP West. The M29 was hopelessly uncompetitive, and South was unable to qualify the car around the streets of Long Beach, lapping almost four seconds slower than his team mate John Watson.

South reappeared two months later at Golden State Raceway (now Sonoma Raceway), California, USA for the opening round of the 1980 SCCA Citicorp Can-Am Challenge. He had signed for Paul Newman's Budweiser sponsored Newman Racing. After a second place at Mosport Park, and scoring pole and leading at Road America before a spin, South crashed badly during practice for the Grand Prix Molson, held on the Circuit Trois-Rivières. His lower left leg was amputated due to severe injuries from this accident, thus ending his career.

In 2008, South was seen at a handful of historic motorsport meetings.

== International racing record ==
=== Career highlights ===
| Season | Series | Standings |
|---|---|---|
| 1975 | BARC BP Super Visco British F3 Championship | 10th |
| 1975 | FIA European F3 Championship | 17th |
| 1976 | BARC BP Super Visco British F3 Championship | 4th |
| 1976 | BRDC Shellsport British F3 Championship | 6th |
| 1977 | BRDC Vandervell British F3 Championship | 1st |
| 1977 | BARC BP Super Visco British F3 Championship | 2nd |
| 1978 | European Championship for F2 Drivers | 16th |
| 1978 | Aurora AFX F1 Championship | 27th |
| 1979 | European Championship for F2 Drivers | 6th |
| 1980 | SCCA Citicorp Can-Am Challenge | 10th |
| 1980 | Formula One | NC |

=== Complete Formula One results ===
(key)

| Year | Entrant | Chassis | Engine | 1 | 2 | 3 | 4 | 5 | 6 | 7 | 8 | 9 | 10 | 11 | 12 | 13 | 14 | WDC | Points |
|---|---|---|---|---|---|---|---|---|---|---|---|---|---|---|---|---|---|---|---|
| 1980 | Marlboro Team McLaren | McLaren M29 | Cosworth V8 | ARG | BRA | RSA | USW; DNQ | BEL | MON | FRA | GBR | GER | AUT | NED | ITA | CAN | USA | NC | 0 |

== Biography – Stephen South: The Way it Was ==
The biography of Stephen South, written by Darren Banks, was published in March 2017. In it, he speaks to the author candidly about the accident that ended his career. Banks also interviewed key figures from his career, and the book contains many never-before-seen photos from the period. It's published by Performance Publishing Ltd.

Sporting positions
| Preceded by Bruno Giacomelli | British Formula 3 Championship; BRDC Series Champion; 1977 | Succeeded by Derek Warwick |
