= 1981 Spanish Grand Prix =

Seventh race of the 1981 Formula One World Championship

- Race 7 of 15 in the 1981 Formula One World Championship

Race details
- Date: 21 June 1981
- Official name: XXVII Gran Premio de España
- Location: Circuito Permanente Del Jarama, Jarama, Spain
- Course: Permanent racing facility
- Course length: 3.312 km (2.06 miles)
- Distance: 80 laps, 264.96 km (164.70 miles)
- Weather: Sunny, hot

Pole position
Driver	(France) Jacques Laffite	Ligier-Matra
- Time: 1:13.754

Fastest lap
Driver	(Australia) Alan Jones	Williams-Ford
- Time: 1:17.818 on lap 5

Podium
First	(Canada) Gilles Villeneuve	Ferrari
Second	(France) Jacques Laffite	Ligier-Matra
Third	(United Kingdom) John Watson	McLaren-Ford

The 1981 Spanish Grand Prix was a Formula One motor race held on 21 June 1981 at the Circuito Permanente del Jarama, Jarama, Spain. It was the seventh race of the 1981 Formula One World Championship.

== Summary ==
The 1981 Spanish Grand Prix featured the second closest finish ever of a Formula One race: after Gilles Villeneuve's Ferrari, the four following cars finished in just 1.24 seconds. This was Villeneuve's last victory, often regarded as his tactical masterpiece.

There were some changes for this race: Eliseo Salazar had left March to join Ensign, replacing Marc Surer. Also, John Player Special sponsorship and livery returned to Team Lotus after a 2-year hiatus.

The pole went to Jacques Laffite on his Ligier-Matra with the two Williams-Cosworth of Alan Jones and Carlos Reutemann second and third ahead of John Watson's McLaren, Alain Prost's Renault and the Alfa Romeo of Bruno Giacomelli. Gilles Villeneuve was seventh.

Race day was unusually hot. At the beginning of the race Jones and Reutemann went into the lead, as Laffite made a poor start. Villeneuve jumped into third place at the first corner, damaging Prost's front wing as he took the position. At the end of the first lap Villeneuve pulled out of Reutemann's slipstream and took second place. Jones began to build a lead but on lap 14 he went off the track, when he was 10 seconds ahead of the Canadian.

This left Villeneuve with Reutemann on his tail. Behind them Watson, Laffite and Elio de Angelis began to close on the dueling leaders. Reutemann was having some trouble with his gearbox and when Laffite arrived behind him there was little the Argentine could do to stop him from overtaking. Reutemann would later drop behind Watson. The five front-runners became a train of cars, packed together for the remaining laps of the race.

Villeneuve used the power of his Ferrari engine on the straight to gain a little margin and not get overtaken by his rivals, but in the corners they were all over him. Many times Laffite pulled alongside the Canadian as they went out a corner but the Ferrari would stay ahead as the horsepower kicked in. The five remained locked together right to the flag, crossing the line covered by just 1.24 seconds to record the second-closest race in the history of Formula One.

This would be the last Spanish Grand Prix at Jarama, owing to criticism of the track being very short and sinuous for modern Formula One, the unpleasant conditions and the small crowd (the small turn-out was probably due to the backlash of the previous year's race not being counted as a World Championship race, the announcement was made on the weekend itself); the last Formula One race in Madrid until 2026, and the last Spanish Grand Prix until the 1986 season, when it would be held at the newly built Jerez circuit in the south of the country. At this Grand Prix the Equipe Banco Occidental team became the last privateer team to have entered a car for a race alongside a works team when they entered a Williams car alongside the Williams works team, but eventually withdrew before the practice and qualifying.

== Classification ==
=== Qualifying ===
Pos	No	Driver	Constructor	Q1	Q2	Gap
1	26	(France) Jacques Laffite	Ligier-Matra	1:14.822	1:13.754	—
2	1	(Australia) Alan Jones	Williams-Ford	1:14.424	1:14.024	+0.270
3	2	(Argentina) Carlos Reutemann	Williams-Ford	1:14.808	1:14.342	+0.588
4	7	(United Kingdom) John Watson	McLaren-Ford	1:15.094	1:14.657	+0.903
5	15	(France) Alain Prost	Renault	1:14.980	1:14.669	+0.915
6	23	(Italy) Bruno Giacomelli	Alfa Romeo	1:16.807	1:14.897	+1.143
7	27	(Canada) Gilles Villeneuve	Ferrari	1:16.548	1:14.987	+1.233
8	22	(United States) Mario Andretti	Alfa Romeo	1:15.576	1:15.159	+1.405
9	5	(Brazil) Nelson Piquet	Brabham-Ford	1:16.861	1:15.355	+1.601
10	11	(Italy) Elio de Angelis	Lotus-Ford	1:15.399	1:15.449	+1.645
11	12	(United Kingdom) Nigel Mansell	Lotus-Ford	1:16.226	1:15.562	+1.808
12	29	(Italy) Riccardo Patrese	Arrows-Ford	1:16.038	1:15.627	+1.873
13	28	(France) Didier Pironi	Ferrari	1:16.522	1:15.715	+1.961
14	8	(Italy) Andrea de Cesaris	McLaren-Ford	1:16.119	1:15.850	+2.096
15	20	(Finland) Keke Rosberg	Fittipaldi-Ford	1:16.040	1:15.924	+2.170
16	33	(France) Patrick Tambay	Theodore-Ford	1:17.347	1:16.355	+2.601
17	16	(France) René Arnoux	Renault	1:17.132	1:16.406	+2.652
18	6	(Mexico) Héctor Rebaque	Brabham-Ford	1:16.722	1:16.527	+2.773
19	25	(France) Jean-Pierre Jabouille	Ligier-Matra	1:16.559	1:16.794	+2.805
20	3	(United States) Eddie Cheever	Tyrrell-Ford	1:17.459	1:16.641	+2.887
21	21	(Brazil) Chico Serra	Fittipaldi-Ford	1:18.705	1:16.782	+3.028
22	17	(Republic of Ireland) Derek Daly	March-Ford	1:17.416	1:16.979	+3.225
23	30	(Italy) Siegfried Stohr	Arrows-Ford	1:18.331	1:17.294	+3.540
24	14	(Chile) Eliseo Salazar	Ensign-Ford	1:18.769	1:17.822	+4.068
25	4	(Italy) Michele Alboreto	Tyrrell-Ford	1:18.859	1:17.943	+4.189
26	31	(Italy) Beppe Gabbiani	Osella-Ford	no time	1:18.169	+4.415
27	9	(Sweden) Slim Borgudd	ATS-Ford	1:20.028	1:18.263	+4.509
28	35	(United Kingdom) Brian Henton	Toleman-Hart	1:19.815	1:18.340	+4.586
29	36	(United Kingdom) Derek Warwick	Toleman-Hart	1:20.342	1:18.872	+5.118
30	32	(Italy) Giorgio Francia	Osella-Ford	1:19.586	8:22.382	+5.832
WD	37	(Spain) Emilio de Villota	Williams-Ford	—	—	—

=== Race ===
Pos	No	Driver	Constructor	Tyre	Laps	Time/Retired	Grid	Points
1	27	(Canada) Gilles Villeneuve	Ferrari	M	80	1:46:35.01	7	9
2	26	(France) Jacques Laffite	Ligier-Matra	M	80	+ 0.22	1	6
3	7	(United Kingdom) John Watson	McLaren-Ford	M	80	+ 0.58	4	4
4	2	(Argentina) Carlos Reutemann	Williams-Ford	M	80	+ 1.01	3	3
5	11	(Italy) Elio de Angelis	Lotus-Ford	M	80	+ 1.24	10	2
6	12	(United Kingdom) Nigel Mansell	Lotus-Ford	M	80	+ 28.58	11	1
7	1	(Australia) Alan Jones	Williams-Ford	M	80	+ 56.58	2	
8	22	(United States) Mario Andretti	Alfa Romeo	M	80	+ 1:00.80	8	
9	16	(France) René Arnoux	Renault	M	80	+ 1:07.08	17	
10	23	(Italy) Bruno Giacomelli	Alfa Romeo	M	80	+ 1:13.65	6	
11	21	(Brazil) Chico Serra	Fittipaldi-Ford	M	79	+ 1 lap	21	
12	20	(Finland) Keke Rosberg	Fittipaldi-Ford	M	78	+ 2 laps	15	
13	33	(France) Patrick Tambay	Theodore-Ford	M	78	+ 2 laps	16	
14	14	(Chile) Eliseo Salazar	Ensign-Ford	M	77	+ 3 laps	24	
15	28	(France) Didier Pironi	Ferrari	M	76	+ 4 laps	13	
16	17	(Republic of Ireland) Derek Daly	March-Ford	M	75	+ 5 laps	22	
NC	3	(United States) Eddie Cheever	Tyrrell-Ford	M	62	+ 18 laps	20	
Ret	25	(France) Jean-Pierre Jabouille	Ligier-Matra	M	51	Brakes	19	
Ret	6	(Mexico) Héctor Rebaque	Brabham-Ford	M	46	Gearbox	18	
Ret	30	(Italy) Siegfried Stohr	Arrows-Ford	M	43	Ignition	23	
Ret	5	(Brazil) Nelson Piquet	Brabham-Ford	M	43	Accident	9	
Ret	15	(France) Alain Prost	Renault	M	28	Spun off	5	
Ret	29	(Italy) Riccardo Patrese	Arrows-Ford	M	21	Brakes	12	
Ret	8	(Italy) Andrea de Cesaris	McLaren-Ford	M	9	Accident	14	
DNQ	4	(Italy) Michele Alboreto	Tyrrell-Ford	M				
DNQ	31	(Italy) Beppe Gabbiani	Osella-Ford	M				
DNQ	9	(Sweden) Slim Borgudd	ATS-Ford	M				
DNQ	35	(United Kingdom) Brian Henton	Toleman-Hart	P				
DNQ	36	(United Kingdom) Derek Warwick	Toleman-Hart	P				
DNQ	32	(Italy) Giorgio Francia	Osella-Ford	M				

== Notes ==
- This was the 300th Grand Prix in which a Frenchman participated. In those 300 races, French drivers had won 15 Grands Prix, achieved 106 podium finishes, 24 pole positions, 29 fastest laps and 2 Grand Slams.

== Championship standings after the race ==
Drivers' Championship standings

Pos	Driver	Points
1	(Argentina) Carlos Reutemann	37
2	(Australia) Alan Jones	24
3	(Brazil) Nelson Piquet	22
4	(Canada) Gilles Villeneuve	21
5	(France) Jacques Laffite	17

Constructors' Championship standings

Pos	Constructor	Points
1	(United Kingdom) Williams-Ford	61
2	(Italy) Ferrari	26
3	(United Kingdom) Brabham-Ford	25
4	(France) Ligier-Matra	17
5	(United Kingdom) Lotus-Ford	12

- Note: Only the top five positions are included for both sets of standings.

Previous race: 1981 Monaco Grand Prix	FIA Formula One World Championship; 1981 season	Next race: 1981 French Grand Prix
Previous race: 1980 Spanish Grand Prix	Spanish Grand Prix	Next race: 1986 Spanish Grand Prix
