= 1981 Belgian Grand Prix =

- Race 5 of 15 in the 1981 Formula One World Championship

Race details
- Date: 17 May 1981
- Location: Circuit Zolder, Heusden-Zolder, Belgium
- Course length: 4.262 km (2.648 miles)
- Distance: 54 laps, 230.148 km (143.007 miles)
- Scheduled distance: 70 laps, 298.340 km (185.380 miles)
- Weather: Dry, then wet at the end

Pole position
| Driver | (Argentina) Carlos Reutemann | Williams-Ford |
- Time: 1:22.28

Fastest lap
| Driver | (Argentina) Carlos Reutemann | Williams-Ford |
- Time: 1:23.30 on lap 37

Podium
| First | (Argentina) Carlos Reutemann | Williams-Ford |
| Second | (France) Jacques Laffite | Ligier-Matra |
| Third | (United Kingdom) Nigel Mansell | Lotus-Ford |

The 1981 Belgian Grand Prix was a Formula One motor race held at Zolder on 17 May 1981. It was the fifth race of the 1981 Formula One World Championship. It was the last of 12 victories for Carlos Reutemann and the last win for an Argentine driver as of 2026. It was also the first of 59 podiums for 1992 World Champion Nigel Mansell.

== Mechanic safety and chaotic first race ==
The race was marred by two serious incidents involving mechanics, one fatal. In Friday practice a mechanic from the Osella team, Giovanni Amadeo, stumbled off the pitwall into the path of the Williams of Carlos Reutemann. Reutemann was unable to avoid the mechanic, who suffered a fractured skull. He died from his injuries on the Monday after the race. Before the start of the race the mechanics of all the teams staged a protest over the safety measures protecting them, which was soon joined by several drivers (Villeneuve, Prost, Laffite, Pironi and Scheckter) who left their cars. According to 1976 World Champion James Hunt who was commentating live for BBC in Sunday Grandstand, the protest was largely over the narrow pits at Zolder and that the pits were overcrowded, especially with people who were nothing more than 'hangers on' who were there to be seen and not for the actual racing.

The race organisers nevertheless flagged the warm-up lap at the normal time, leaving several cars delayed on the grid, either stalled or with their cockpits vacant. The resulting chaos when the grid formed up again at the end of this lap was exacerbated when Nelson Piquet missed his starting position and was sent round on another lap, with the other cars being held in position. As the cars began to overheat, several drivers turned off their engines, among them Arrows driver Riccardo Patrese, expecting another formation lap due to Piquet's error. However, the organisers began the start sequence as usual once Piquet had regained his position. Patrese was unable to restart his car and waved his arms to signal that he could not take the start. His mechanic, Dave Luckett, came onto the track to restart the car from behind. As he did so, the Clerk of the Course had already started the lighting sequence to start the race, and the race went ahead despite his presence and Patrese's gesticulations. The other Arrows driver, Siegfried Stohr, ploughed into the back of his teammate's car, hitting Luckett. Luckett suffered a broken leg and lacerations but survived the incident. The race continued, and as the field was about to start the second lap, Stohr's disabled car was still on the circuit, and some of the furious marshals, who did not have the official authority to stop the race jumped onto the track and frantically waved at the drivers to stop while the cars passed by with very little space on the narrow track. The confused drivers waved back at the marshals, and on the next lap the drivers did stop at their own accord.

As a result of these events, a new rule was introduced forbidding mechanics from being on the grid within fifteen seconds of the formation lap, and the race starter would use greater caution.

== Race report ==
In the race, Reutemann was passed by Didier Pironi going into the first corner. Then Alan Jones nudged off Nelson Piquet at the early stages of the race and Piquet crashed into some catch fencing at the chicane. A few laps later, Jones's gearbox failed, and he ploughed into the barriers and badly burned his left thigh after the gearbox oil leaked into his cockpit. Following Jones's retirement, Piquet, still furious after their previous incident, stormed to the Williams garage and had an altercation with Jones and the Williams personnel. Pironi had fallen back and after Jones's accident, Reutemann took the lead, keeping it until the race was called off early because of rain starting to fall on the track. It was his second victory of the season and the 12th and ultimately final victory of his career.

== Classification ==
=== Qualifying ===
| Pos | No | Driver | Constructor | Q1 | Q2 | Gap |
|---|---|---|---|---|---|---|
| 1 | 2 | (Argentina) Carlos Reutemann | Williams-Ford | 1:22.28 | 1:36.27 | — |
| 2 | 5 | (Brazil) Nelson Piquet | Brabham-Ford | 1:23.13 | no time | +0.85 |
| 3 | 28 | (France) Didier Pironi | Ferrari | 1:23.47 | 1:36.76 | +1.19 |
| 4 | 29 | (Italy) Riccardo Patrese | Arrows-Ford | 1:23.67 | 1:38.28 | +1.39 |
| 5 | 7 | (United Kingdom) John Watson | McLaren-Ford | 1:23.73 | 1:30.92 | +1.45 |
| 6 | 1 | (Australia) Alan Jones | Williams-Ford | 1:23.82 | 1:27.43 | +1.54 |
| 7 | 27 | (Canada) Gilles Villeneuve | Ferrari | 1:23.94 | 1:27.33 | +1.66 |
| 8 | 3 | (United States) Eddie Cheever | Tyrrell-Ford | 1:24.38 | 1:31.00 | +2.10 |
| 9 | 26 | (France) Jacques Laffite | Ligier-Matra | 1:24.41 | 1:44.07 | +2.13 |
| 10 | 12 | (United Kingdom) Nigel Mansell | Lotus-Ford | 1:24.44 | no time | +2.16 |
| 11 | 20 | (Finland) Keke Rosberg | Fittipaldi-Ford | 1:24.46 | no time | +2.18 |
| 12 | 15 | (France) Alain Prost | Renault | 1:24.63 | 1:43.35 | +2.35 |
| 13 | 30 | (Italy) Siegfried Stohr | Arrows-Ford | 1:24.66 | no time | +2.38 |
| 14 | 11 | (Italy) Elio de Angelis | Lotus-Ford | 1:24.96 | no time | +2.68 |
| 15 | 14 | (Switzerland) Marc Surer | Ensign-Ford | 1:25.19 | no time | +2.91 |
| 16 | 25 | (France) Jean-Pierre Jabouille | Ligier-Matra | 1:25.28 | 1:38.87 | +3.00 |
| 17 | 23 | (Italy) Bruno Giacomelli | Alfa Romeo | 1:25.31 | 1:37.77 | +3.03 |
| 18 | 22 | (United States) Mario Andretti | Alfa Romeo | 1:25.56 | 1:32.17 | +3.28 |
| 19 | 4 | (Italy) Michele Alboreto | Tyrrell-Ford | 1:25.91 | 1:32.21 | +3.63 |
| 20 | 21 | (Brazil) Chico Serra | Fittipaldi-Ford | 1:25.93 | no time | +3.65 |
| 21 | 6 | (Mexico) Héctor Rebaque | Brabham-Ford | 1:26.52 | 2:49.14 | +4.24 |
| 22 | 32 | (Italy) Beppe Gabbiani | Osella-Ford | 1:26.69 | no time | +4.41 |
| 23 | 8 | (Italy) Andrea de Cesaris | McLaren-Ford | 1:26.95 | 1:30.99 | +4.67 |
| 24 | 31 | (Italy) Piercarlo Ghinzani | Osella-Ford | 1:27.48 | no time | +5.20 |
| 25 | 16 | (France) René Arnoux | Renault | 1:27.93 | 1:30.71 | +5.65 |
| 26 | 17 | (Chile) Eliseo Salazar | March-Ford | 1:28.38 | 1:35.66 | +6.10 |
| 27 | 9 | (Sweden) Slim Borgudd | ATS-Ford | 1:28.98 | 1:35.79 | +6.70 |
| 28 | 33 | (France) Patrick Tambay | Theodore-Ford | no time | 1:32.47 | +10.19 |
| 29 | 36 | (United Kingdom) Derek Warwick | Toleman-Hart | 1:35.97 | no time | +13.69 |
| 30 | 35 | (United Kingdom) Brian Henton | Toleman-Hart | 1:36.37 | 1:42.95 | +14.09 |
| 31† | 18 | (Republic of Ireland) Derek Daly | March-Ford | — | — | — |

- † — time disallowed.

=== Race ===
| Pos | No | Driver | Constructor | Tyre | Laps | Time/Retired | Grid | Points |
|---|---|---|---|---|---|---|---|---|
| 1 | 2 | (Argentina) Carlos Reutemann | Williams-Ford | M | 54 | 1:16:31.61 | 1 | 9 |
| 2 | 26 | (France) Jacques Laffite | Ligier-Matra | M | 54 | + 36.06 | 9 | 6 |
| 3 | 12 | (United Kingdom) Nigel Mansell | Lotus-Ford | M | 54 | + 43.69 | 10 | 4 |
| 4 | 27 | (Canada) Gilles Villeneuve | Ferrari | M | 54 | + 47.64 | 7 | 3 |
| 5 | 11 | (Italy) Elio de Angelis | Lotus-Ford | M | 54 | + 49.20 | 14 | 2 |
| 6 | 3 | (United States) Eddie Cheever | Tyrrell-Ford | M | 54 | + 52.51 | 8 | 1 |
| 7 | 7 | (United Kingdom) John Watson | McLaren-Ford | M | 54 | + 1:01.66 | 5 | |
| 8 | 28 | (France) Didier Pironi | Ferrari | M | 54 | + 1:32.04 | 3 | |
| 9 | 23 | (Italy) Bruno Giacomelli | Alfa Romeo | M | 54 | + 1:35.58 | 17 | |
| 10 | 22 | (United States) Mario Andretti | Alfa Romeo | M | 53 | + 1 Lap | 18 | |
| 11 | 14 | (Switzerland) Marc Surer | Ensign-Ford | M | 52 | + 2 Laps | 15 | |
| 12 | 4 | (Italy) Michele Alboreto | Tyrrell-Ford | M | 52 | + 2 Laps | 19 | |
| 13 | 31 | (Italy) Piercarlo Ghinzani | Osella-Ford | M | 50 | + 4 Laps | 24 | |
| Ret | 6 | (Mexico) Héctor Rebaque | Brabham-Ford | M | 39 | Accident | 21 | |
| Ret | 25 | (France) Jean-Pierre Jabouille | Ligier-Matra | M | 35 | Transmission | 16 | |
| Ret | 21 | (Brazil) Chico Serra | Fittipaldi-Ford | M | 29 | Engine | 20 | |
| Ret | 32 | (Italy) Beppe Gabbiani | Osella-Ford | M | 22 | Engine | 22 | |
| Ret | 1 | (Australia) Alan Jones | Williams-Ford | M | 19 | Accident | 6 | |
| Ret | 8 | (Italy) Andrea de Cesaris | McLaren-Ford | M | 11 | Gearbox | 23 | |
| Ret | 5 | (Brazil) Nelson Piquet | Brabham-Ford | M | 10 | Accident | 2 | |
| Ret | 20 | (Finland) Keke Rosberg | Fittipaldi-Ford | A | 10 | Gearbox | 11 | |
| Ret | 15 | (France) Alain Prost | Renault | M | 2 | Clutch | 12 | |
| Ret | 29 | (Italy) Riccardo Patrese | Arrows-Ford | M | 0 | Collision | 4 | |
| Ret | 30 | (Italy) Siegfried Stohr | Arrows-Ford | M | 0 | Collision | 13 | |
| DNQ | 18 | (Republic of Ireland) Derek Daly | March-Ford | M | | | | |
| DNQ | 16 | (France) René Arnoux | Renault | M | | | | |
| DNQ | 17 | (Chile) Eliseo Salazar | March-Ford | M | | | | |
| DNQ | 9 | (Sweden) Slim Borgudd | ATS-Ford | M | | | | |
| DNQ | 33 | (France) Patrick Tambay | Theodore-Ford | M | | | | |
| DNQ | 36 | (United Kingdom) Derek Warwick | Toleman-Hart | P | | | | |
| DNQ | 35 | (United Kingdom) Brian Henton | Toleman-Hart | P | | | | |

== Notes ==
- This was the Formula One World Championship debut for Italian driver Piercarlo Ghinzani.
- This was the 10th Grand Slam for an Argentinian driver.
- This was the 50th Grand Prix start for Williams.
- This was the 100th Grand Prix start for a Matra-powered car. In those 100 races, Matra-powered cars had won 1 Grand Prix, achieved 14 podium finishes, 3 pole positions and 5 fastest laps.

== Championship standings after the race ==
Drivers' Championship standings

| Pos | Driver | Points |
|---|---|---|
| 1 | (Argentina) Carlos Reutemann | 34 |
| 2 | (Brazil) Nelson Piquet | 22 |
| 3 | (Australia) Alan Jones | 18 |
| 4 | (Italy) Riccardo Patrese | 10 |
| 5 | (France) Jacques Laffite | 7 |

Constructors' Championship standings

| Pos | Constructor | Points |
|---|---|---|
| 1 | (United Kingdom) Williams-Ford | 52 |
| 2 | (United Kingdom) Brabham-Ford | 25 |
| 3 | (United Kingdom) Arrows-Ford | 10 |
| 4 | (United Kingdom) Lotus-Ford | 9 |
| 5 | (France) Ligier-Matra | 7 |

- Note: Only the top five positions are included for both sets of standings.

| Previous race: 1981 San Marino Grand Prix | FIA Formula One World Championship; 1981 season | Next race: 1981 Monaco Grand Prix |
| Previous race: 1980 Belgian Grand Prix | Belgian Grand Prix | Next race: 1982 Belgian Grand Prix |
