= 1981 Italian Grand Prix =

- Race 13 of 15 in the 1981 Formula One World Championship
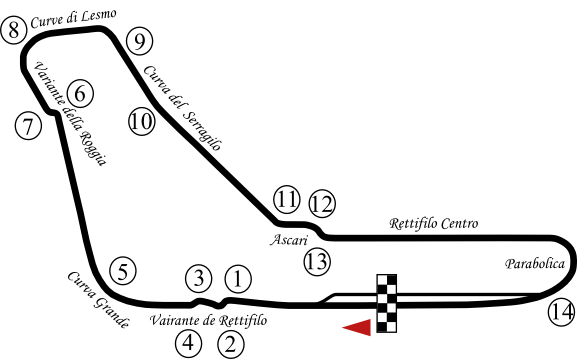

Race details
- Date: 13 September 1981
- Official name: LII Gran Premio d'Italia
- Location: Autodromo Nazionale di Monza; Monza, Lombardy, Italy
- Course: Permanent racing facility
- Course length: 5.8 km (3.604 miles)
- Distance: 52 laps, 301.6 km (187.406 miles)
- Weather: Dry and sunny

Pole position
Driver	(France) René Arnoux	Renault
- Time: 1:33.467

Fastest lap
Driver	(Argentina) Carlos Reutemann	Williams-Ford
- Time: 1:37.528 on lap 48

Podium
First	(France) Alain Prost	Renault
Second	(Australia) Alan Jones	Williams-Ford
Third	(Argentina) Carlos Reutemann	Williams-Ford

The 1981 Italian Grand Prix was a Formula One motor race held at Monza on 13 September 1981. It was the thirteenth race of the 1981 Formula One World Championship.

Formula One returned to Monza after the previous year's Italian Grand Prix had been held at Imola. The 52-lap race was won by Frenchman Alain Prost, who led every lap in his Renault after starting from third position. Australian Alan Jones finished second in a Williams-Ford, some 22 seconds behind, with Argentine teammate Carlos Reutemann third.

Reutemann came into the race tied on points at the top of the Drivers' Championship with Brazilian Nelson Piquet, driving a Brabham-Ford. Piquet suffered a last-lap engine failure which dropped him from third to sixth, giving Reutemann a three-point lead in the championship with two races remaining.

== Qualifying report ==
Qualifying saw René Arnoux take pole position in his Renault by 0.67 seconds from Carlos Reutemann's Williams. It was Arnoux's fourth pole position of the season and the sixth in succession for the Renault team. Alain Prost was third in the other Renault, with Jacques Laffite in the Ligier alongside him on the second row of the grid. Alan Jones in the other Williams and Nelson Piquet in the Brabham made up the third row, and the top ten was completed by John Watson in the McLaren, Didier Pironi and Gilles Villeneuve in the two Ferraris, and Bruno Giacomelli in the Alfa Romeo.

For the first time, the Toleman team qualified for a race, with Brian Henton taking 23rd. Teammate Derek Warwick failed to qualify along with Marc Surer in the Theodore, Beppe Gabbiani in the Osella, Siegfried Stohr in the Arrows, and Keke Rosberg and Chico Serra in the two Fittipaldis. Stohr crashed heavily during the qualifying session; already haunted by the trauma of nearly killing mechanic Dave Luckett in an accident in Belgium earlier in the season. He ultimately decided to stop racing and start a successful motor racing academy.

=== Qualifying classification ===
Pos	No	Driver	Constructor	Q1	Q2	Gap
1	16	(France) René Arnoux	Renault	1:34.042	1:33.467	
2	2	(Argentina) Carlos Reutemann	Williams-Ford	1:35.153	1:34.140	+0.673
3	15	(France) Alain Prost	Renault	1:34.492	1:34.374	+0.907
4	26	(France) Jacques Laffite	Ligier-Matra	1:36.529	1:35.062	+1.575
5	1	(Australia) Alan Jones	Williams-Ford	1:35.983	1:35.359	+1.892
6	5	(Brazil) Nelson Piquet	Brabham-Ford	1:35.449	1:35.484	+1.982
7	7	(United Kingdom) John Watson	McLaren-Ford	1:35.795	1:35.557	+2.090
8	28	(France) Didier Pironi	Ferrari	1:35.977	1:35.596	+2.129
9	27	(Canada) Gilles Villeneuve	Ferrari	1:35.627	1:55.012	+2.160
10	23	(Italy) Bruno Giacomelli	Alfa Romeo	1:38.617	1:35.946	+2.479
11	11	(Italy) Elio de Angelis	Lotus-Ford	1:36.158	1:36.309	+2.691
12	12	(United Kingdom) Nigel Mansell	Lotus-Ford	1:38.100	1:36.210	+2.743
13	22	(United States) Mario Andretti	Alfa Romeo	1:37.166	1:36.296	+2.829
14	6	(Mexico) Héctor Rebaque	Brabham-Ford	1:37.131	1:36.472	+3.005
15	25	(France) Patrick Tambay	Ligier-Matra	1:36.515	1:36.545	+3.048
16	8	(Italy) Andrea de Cesaris	McLaren-Ford	no time	1:37.019	+3.552
17	3	(United States) Eddie Cheever	Tyrrell-Ford	1:38.736	1:37.160	+3.693
18	32	(France) Jean-Pierre Jarier	Osella-Ford	1:38.167	1:37.264	+3.797
19	17	(Republic of Ireland) Derek Daly	March-Ford	1:38.852	1:37.303	+3.836
20	29	(Italy) Riccardo Patrese	Arrows-Ford	1:37.355	1:37.552	+3.888
21	9	(Sweden) Slim Borgudd	ATS-Ford	1:39.106	1:37.807	+4.340
22	4	(Italy) Michele Alboreto	Tyrrell-Ford	1:38.411	1:37.912	+4.445
23	35	(United Kingdom) Brian Henton	Toleman-Hart	1:41.369	1:38.012	+4.545
24	14	(Chile) Eliseo Salazar	Ensign-Ford	1:39.033	1:38.053	+4.586
DNQ	33	(Switzerland) Marc Surer	Theodore-Ford	1:38.778	1:38.114	+4.647
DNQ	31	(Italy) Beppe Gabbiani	Osella-Ford	1:40.930	1:38.474	+5.007
DNQ	36	(United Kingdom) Derek Warwick	Toleman-Hart	1:39.936	1:39.279	+5.812
DNQ	30	(Italy) Siegfried Stohr	Arrows-Ford	1:39.713	1:39.776	+6.246
DNQ	20	(Finland) Keke Rosberg	Fittipaldi-Ford	1:42.229	1:40.345	+6.878
DNQ	21	(Brazil) Chico Serra	Fittipaldi-Ford	1:41.185	1:40.437	+6.970

== Race report ==
On the run-up to the first chicane, Prost passed both Reutemann and teammate Arnoux to take the lead, while Pironi jumped from eighth to fourth. Reutemann then overtook Arnoux at the Curva Grande, before Pironi overtook both to run second by the end of the lap. As Prost opened up a lead, Arnoux re-passed Reutemann on lap 2 and Pironi on lap 5. Laffite, having already passed Reutemann, then overtook Pironi for third on lap 6, as Villeneuve retired with an engine failure.

On lap 12, Laffite dropped out with a puncture, by which point Pironi had dropped back behind Reutemann and Jones. As rain started to fall, Jones passed teammate Reutemann for third. At the end of the lap, Eddie Cheever spun his Tyrrell out at the Parabolica; on the next lap, Arnoux himself spun out after swerving to avoid Cheever's abandoned car, leaving Prost comfortably clear of Jones. Reutemann, struggling as the track started to dry again, soon fell to eighth behind Giacomelli, Patrick Tambay in the second Ligier (who had only started 15th), Piquet, Pironi and Watson.

On lap 20, Watson lost control exiting the second Lesmo bend and smashed into the barriers at high speed. The McLaren was torn in two, with the gearbox and rear wheels going across the track and clipping the second Tyrrell of Michele Alboreto, who also retired. Watson escaped unharmed.

On lap 23 Tambay, like teammate Laffite, retired with a puncture, before Giacomelli pulled into the pits with a jammed gearbox on lap 26. Piquet was thus promoted to third with Pironi fourth and Reutemann fifth, followed by Mario Andretti in the second Alfa Romeo, Elio de Angelis in the Lotus and Andrea de Cesaris in the second McLaren. Reutemann soon passed Pironi again, before Andretti suffered an engine failure on lap 41.

As Prost cruised to victory, ultimately finishing some 22 seconds ahead of Jones, Piquet looked set to hold off championship rival Reutemann for third, until his engine blew on the last lap. Reutemann duly went past, as did de Angelis and Pironi. Piquet was classified sixth ahead of de Cesaris, who himself suffered a puncture on the last lap. The only other finishers were Giacomelli, Jean-Pierre Jarier in the second Osella, and Henton.

Reutemann thus led the Drivers' Championship by three points from Piquet with two races remaining, with Prost, Jones and Laffite all retaining outside chances of the title. The Williams team, meanwhile, needed just two more points to secure their second consecutive Constructors' Championship.

=== Race classification ===
Pos	No	Driver	Constructor	Tyre	Laps	Time/Retired	Grid	Points
1	15	(France) Alain Prost	Renault	M	52	1:26:36.897	3	9
2	1	(Australia) Alan Jones	Williams-Ford	G	52	+ 22.175	5	6
3	2	(Argentina) Carlos Reutemann	Williams-Ford	G	52	+ 50.587	2	4
4	11	(Italy) Elio de Angelis	Lotus-Ford	G	52	+ 1:32.902	11	3
5	28	(France) Didier Pironi	Ferrari	M	52	+ 1:34.522	8	2
6	5	(Brazil) Nelson Piquet	Brabham-Ford	G	51	Engine	6	1
7	8	(Italy) Andrea de Cesaris	McLaren-Ford	M	51	Puncture	16	
8	23	(Italy) Bruno Giacomelli	Alfa Romeo	M	50	+ 2 laps	10	
9	32	(France) Jean-Pierre Jarier	Osella-Ford	M	50	+ 2 laps	18	
10	35	(United Kingdom) Brian Henton	Toleman-Hart	P	49	+ 3 laps	23	
Ret	22	(United States) Mario Andretti	Alfa Romeo	M	40	Engine	13	
Ret	17	(Republic of Ireland) Derek Daly	March-Ford	A	36	Gearbox	19	
Ret	25	(France) Patrick Tambay	Ligier-Matra	M	22	Puncture	15	
Ret	12	(United Kingdom) Nigel Mansell	Lotus-Ford	G	21	Suspension	12	
Ret	7	(United Kingdom) John Watson	McLaren-Ford	M	19	Accident	7	
Ret	29	(Italy) Riccardo Patrese	Arrows-Ford	P	18	Gearbox	20	
Ret	4	(Italy) Michele Alboreto	Tyrrell-Ford	G	17	Accident	22	
Ret	14	(Chile) Eliseo Salazar	Ensign-Ford	A	13	Spun off	24	
Ret	16	(France) René Arnoux	Renault	M	12	Spun off	1	
Ret	26	(France) Jacques Laffite	Ligier-Matra	M	11	Puncture	4	
Ret	3	(United States) Eddie Cheever	Tyrrell-Ford	G	11	Spun off	17	
Ret	9	(Sweden) Slim Borgudd	ATS-Ford	A	10	Spun off	21	
Ret	27	(Canada) Gilles Villeneuve	Ferrari	M	5	Engine	9	
Ret	6	(Mexico) Héctor Rebaque	Brabham-Ford	G	1	Electrical	14	
DNQ	33	(Switzerland) Marc Surer	Theodore-Ford	A				
DNQ	31	(Italy) Beppe Gabbiani	Osella-Ford	M				
DNQ	36	(United Kingdom) Derek Warwick	Toleman-Hart	P				
DNQ	30	(Italy) Siegfried Stohr	Arrows-Ford	P				
DNQ	20	(Finland) Keke Rosberg	Fittipaldi-Ford	P				
DNQ	21	(Brazil) Chico Serra	Fittipaldi-Ford	P				

== Notes ==
- This was the 1st Grand Prix start for Toleman and for a Hart-powered car.
- This was the 44th podium finish for Carlos Reutemann. It broke the previous record set by Jackie Stewart at the 1973 Austrian Grand Prix.

== Championship standings after the race ==
Drivers' Championship standings

Pos	Driver	Points
1	(Argentina) Carlos Reutemann	49
2	(Brazil) Nelson Piquet	46
3	(France) Alain Prost	37
4	(Australia) Alan Jones	37
5	(France) Jacques Laffite	34

Constructors' Championship standings

Pos	Constructor	Points
1	(United Kingdom) Williams-Ford	86
2	(United Kingdom) Brabham-Ford	57
3	(France) Renault	48
4	(France) Ligier-Matra	34
5	(Italy) Ferrari	30

- Note: Only the top five positions are included for both sets of standings.

Previous race: 1981 Dutch Grand Prix	FIA Formula One World Championship; 1981 season	Next race: 1981 Canadian Grand Prix
Previous race: 1980 Italian Grand Prix	Italian Grand Prix	Next race: 1982 Italian Grand Prix
