= Beppe Gabbiani =

Italian racing driver (born 1957)

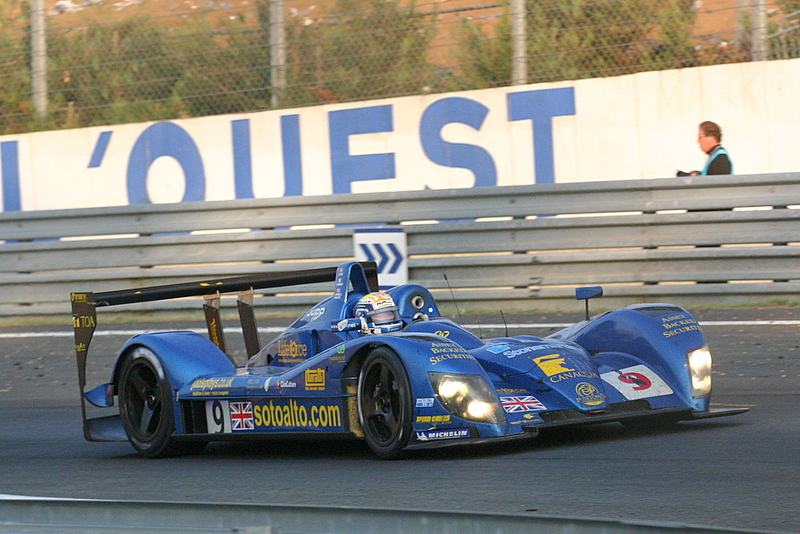
- Born: 2 January 1957 (age 69); Piacenza, Italy

Formula One World Championship career
- Nationality: (Italy) Italian
- Active years: 1978, 1981
- Team(s): Surtees, Osella
- Entries: 17 (3 Starts)
- Championships: 0
- Wins: 0
- Podiums: 0
- Career points: 0
- Pole positions: 0
- Fastest laps: 0
- First entry: 1978 United States Grand Prix
- Last entry: 1981 Caesars Palace Grand Prix

Giuseppe "Beppe" Gabbiani (born 2 January 1957) is an Italian racing driver. He participated in 17 World Championship Formula One Grands Prix, debuting on 1 October 1978, and scored no championship points.

In Formula 2, Gabbiani won the 1983 BRDC International Trophy and the 1983 Eifelrennen.

In sports car racing, Gabbiani finished third in the 2003 1000km Spa.

== Racing record ==
=== Complete European Formula Two Championship results ===
(key) (Races in bold indicate pole position; races in italics indicate fastest lap)

Year	Entrant	Chassis	Engine	1	2	3	4	5	6	7	8	9	10	11	12	13	Pos.	Pts
1978	Trivellato Racing Team	Chevron B42	Ferrari	THR; 7	HOC; 11	NÜR; Ret	PAU	MUG; Ret	VLL; 5	ROU; DNQ	DON; DNQ	NOG; 15	PER; Ret	MIS; 12	HOC; DNQ		20th	2
1979	Polifac BMW Junior Team	March 792	BMW	SIL; DNS	HOC; Ret	THR; Ret	NÜR; 11	VLL; Ret	MUG; 2	PAU; 4	HOC; 3	ZAN; Ret	PER; 9	MIS; 2	DON; DNS		5th	19
1980	Minardi Team	Minardi G75	BMW	THR	HOC	NÜR	VLL	PAU	SIL; 14								17th	1
1980	MM Mampe Team	Maurer MM80	BMW							ZOL; Ret	MUG; 11	ZAN; 6	PER; Ret	MIS; 7	HOC; Ret		17th	1
1982	Maurer Motorsport	Maurer MM82	BMW	SIL; 3	HOC; 5	THR; 4	NÜR; DNS	MUG; Ret	VLL; Ret	PAU; Ret	SPA; 8	HOC; 2	DON; 4	MAN; 3	PER; Ret	MIS; 3	5th	26
1983	Onyx Racing	March 832	BMW	SIL; 1	THR; 1	HOC; Ret	NÜR; 1	**VLL**; 1	PAU; Ret	JAR; 7	DON; Ret	MIS; Ret	PER; 4	ZOL; Ret	MUG; 9		**3rd**	**39**
1984	Onyx Racing	March 842	BMW	SIL	HOC	THR	VLL	MUG	PAU	HOC	MIS	PER; Ret	DON	BRH			NC	0

=== Complete Formula One World Championship results ===
(key)

Year	Entrant	Chassis	Engine	1	2	3	4	5	6	7	8	9	10	11	12	13	14	15	16	WDC	Pts
1978	Team Surtees	Surtees TS20	Ford Cosworth DFV 3.0 V8	ARG	BRA	RSA	USW	MON	BEL	ESP	SWE	FRA	GBR	GER	AUT	NED	ITA	USA; DNQ	CAN; DNQ	NC	0
1981	Osella Squadra Corse	Osella FA1B	Ford Cosworth DFV 3.0 V8	USW; Ret	BRA; DNQ	ARG; DNQ	SMR; Ret	BEL; Ret	MON; DNQ	ESP; DNQ	FRA; DNQ	GBR; DNQ	GER; DNQ	AUT; DNQ	NED; DNQ	ITA; DNQ	CAN; DNQ	CPL; DNQ		NC	0

=== Complete 24 Hours of Le Mans results ===
Year	Team	Co-Drivers	Car	Class	Laps	Pos.	Class Pos.
1981	(Italy) Martini Racing	(Italy) Emanuele Pirro	Lancia Beta Monte Carlo	Gr.5	47	DNF	DNF
1984	(Italy) Scuderia Jolly Club	(Italy) Pierluigi Martini (France) Xavier Lapeyre	Lancia LC2	C1	117	DNF	DNF
1986	(Japan) Dome Co. Ltd.	(Sweden) Eje Elgh (Japan) Toshio Suzuki	Dome 86C-L	C1	296	NC	NC
2003	(Netherlands) Racing for Holland	(France) Tristan Gommendy (Bolivia) Felipe Ortiz	Dome S101	LMP900	316	DNF	DNF
2006	(United Kingdom) Creation Autosportif Ltd.	(United Kingdom) Jamie Campbell-Walter (Switzerland) Felipe Ortiz	Creation CA06/H	LMP1	240	DNF	DNF

=== Complete International Formula 3000 results ===
(key) (Races in bold indicate pole position; races in italics indicate fastest lap.)

Year	Entrant	Chassis	Engine	1	2	3	4	5	6	7	8	9	10	11	Pos.	Pts
1986	ITI 3000	March 86B	Cosworth	SIL	VLL	PAU	SPA	IMO	MUG	PER	ÖST	BIR	BUG; DNQ	JAR	NC	0
1987	First Racing	March 87B	Cosworth	SIL	VLL; 12	SPA; Ret	PAU	DON	PER	BRH	BIR	IMO	BUG	JAR	NC	0
