= Siegfried Stohr =

Italian racing driver (born 1952)

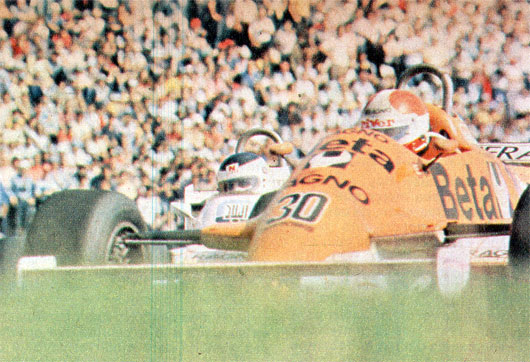
- Stohr at the 1981 Argentine Grand Prix
- Born: 10 October 1952 (age 74); Rimini, Italy

Formula One World Championship career
- Nationality: (Italy) Italian
- Active years: 1981
- Team: Arrows
- Entries: 13 (9 starts)
- Championships: 0
- Wins: 0
- Podiums: 0
- Career points: 0
- Pole positions: 0
- Fastest laps: 0
- First entry: 1981 United States Grand Prix West
- Last entry: 1981 Italian Grand Prix

Siegfried Stohr (born 10 October 1952) is an Italian former racing driver. He participated in 13 Formula One World Championship Grands Prix, debuting on 15 March 1981. He scored no championship points.

== Biography ==
Stohr started in the Italian Formula Italia class in 1976 finishing second in the championship. In 1977, he won the series. Stohr won the Italian Formula Three Championship in 1978 driving a Chevron and progressed to Formula two for 1979 where he took second places at Vallelunga and Pau, with a Chevron before switching with less success to a March. For 1980, he joined Alan Docking Racing, driving a Toleman, and finished fourth in the championship with one win, at Enna.

Stohr joined Arrows for the 1981 Formula One season, as teammate to Riccardo Patrese. Patrese proved considerably faster than Stohr, who struggled in his first few races. Just as Stohr began to improve, he was involved in a start-line accident at the 1981 Belgian Grand Prix; after Patrese's engine stalled, his mechanic Dave Luckett ran onto the grid to try to reignite it while the race had already started. Stohr crashed into the back of Patrese's car, seriously injuring Luckett. Stohr's confidence was badly affected by the accident and his performance throughout the rest of the season deteriorated, along with that of his team, relative to their rivals. Stohr retired before the end of the season after crashing out of qualifying for the Italian Grand Prix.

After Formula One, Stohr made a short lived comeback in the Italian Superturismo Championship in 1989 driving a BMW M3.

A psychology graduate at the University of Padua, Stohr started a racing school and safe driving academy at the Misano circuit in 1982. In the 1990s, he became a regular columnist for the Italian motorsport weekly Autosprint. He also wrote columns about driving safety in several publications.

== Career results ==
=== Complete European Formula Two Championship results ===
(key) (Races in bold indicate pole position; races in italics indicate fastest lap)

Year	Entrant	Chassis	Engine	1	2	3	4	5	6	7	8	9	10	11	12	Pos.	Pts
1979	Trivellato Racing Team	March 792	BMW	SIL; Ret	HOC; 9	THR; Ret	NÜR; 4	VLL; 2	MUG; 11	PAU; 2	HOC; Ret	ZAN; 7	PER; Ret	MIS; 5	DON; Ret	8th	17
1980	Alan Docking Racing	Toleman TG280	Hart	THR	HOC	NÜR; 4	VLL; 5	PAU; 2	SIL; 18	ZOL; 3	MUG; 6	ZAN; Ret	**PER**; **1**	MIS; 13	HOC; 3	4th	29

=== Complete Formula One World Championship results ===
(key)

Year	Entrant	Chassis	Engine	1	2	3	4	5	6	7	8	9	10	11	12	13	14	15	WDC	Points
1981	Arrows Racing Team	Arrows A3	Cosworth V8	USW; DNQ	BRA; Ret	ARG; 9	SMR; DNQ	BEL; Ret	MON; Ret	ESP; Ret	FRA; DNQ	GBR; Ret	GER; 12	AUT; Ret	NED; 7	ITA; DNQ	CAN	CPL	NC	0

=== Complete Formula One non-championship results ===
(key)

Year	Entrant	Chassis	Engine	1
1981	Arrows Racing Team	Arrows A3	Ford Cosworth DFV 3.0 V8	RSA; Ret

Sporting positions
Preceded by Elio de Angelis	Italian Formula Three Champion; 1978	Succeeded by Piercarlo Ghinzani
