= Alberto Colombo (racing driver) =

Italian racing driver (1946–2024)

- Born: 23 February 1946; Varedo, Lombardy, Italy
- Died: 7 January 2024 (aged 77)

Formula One World Championship career
- Nationality: (Italy) Italian
- Active years: 1978
- Team(s): ATS, Merzario
- Entries: 3 (0 starts)
- Championships: 0
- Wins: 0
- Podiums: 0
- Career points: 0
- Pole positions: 0
- Fastest laps: 0
- First entry: 1978 Belgian Grand Prix
- Last entry: 1978 Italian Grand Prix

Alberto Colombo (23 February 1946 – 7 January 2024) was an Italian racing driver. He unsuccessfully entered three Formula One Grands Prix in 1978 with ATS (two failures to qualify) and Merzario (one failure to pre-qualify). He won the 1974 Italian Formula Three Championship and also enjoyed some success in Formula Two.

== Career ==
In 1980, Colombo was involved in the Team Riviera Formula 1 project, with the role of driver and team manager. With Gianfranco Bielli as technical director, Riviera secured a sponsorship deal with the French sportwear company Le Coq Sportif, and took over much of the material from the defunct Kauhsen Formula 1 Team. They commissioned a new chassis to former Merzario chief designer Giorgio Valentini, but the car was never assembled due to lack of funds and the team quietly folded.

After he retired from active racing, Colombo run the Sanremo Racing team throughout the 1980s as team owner and manager in the European Formula 2 Championship and the FIA International F3000 Championship, helping to promote the careers of young Italian racing drivers such as Gabriele Tarquini, Carlo Rossi, Guido Daccò and Ivan Capelli.

Colombo died on 7 January 2024, at the age of 77, after a long illness.

== Racing record ==
=== Complete European Formula Two Championship results ===
(key) (Races in bold indicate pole position; races in italics indicate fastest lap)

Year	Entrant	Chassis	Engine	1	2	3	4	5	6	7	8	9	10	11	12	13	14	15	16	17	Pos.	Pts
1973	Silvio Moser Racing Team	Surtees TS10	Ford	MAL	HOC	THR	NÜR	PAU	KIN	NIV	HOC	ROU	MNZ	MAN	KAR	PER	SAL	NOR	ALB	VLL; Ret	NC	0
1974	Vittorio Brambilla	March 732	BMW	BAR	HOC	PAU	SAL	HOC	MUG	KAR	PER	HOC	VLL; Ret								NC	0
1975	Trivellato Racing Team	March 752	BMW	EST; 7	THR; Ret	HOC		PAU; 9	HOC; 9	SAL; 7	ROU; Ret	MUG; Ret	PER; Ret	SIL; NC	ZOL; Ret	NOG; 6	VLL; DNQ				25th	1
1975	Trivellato Racing Team	March 742	BMW				NÜR; Ret														25th	1
1976	Delta Squadra Corse	March 752	BMW	HOC; 9	THR; 10	VLL; 7	SAL; 12	PAU; Ret	HOC; 8	ROU; Ret											17th	1
1976	Alberto Colombo	March 752	BMW								MUG; Ret	PER; Ret	EST; 6	NOG; 12	HOC; 18						17th	1
1977	AFMP Euroracing	March 772	BMW	SIL; 5	THR; 4	HOC; 6	NÜR; 11	VLL; 5	PAU; 4	MUG; 3	ROU; 6	NOG; 6	PER; Ret	MIS; Ret	EST; 13	DON; 13					7th	18
1978	San Remo Racing	March 782	BMW	THR; 8	HOC; 5	NÜR; 7	PAU; NC	MUG; 5	VLL	ROU; 4	DON; Ret	NOG; 4	PER; Ret	MIS; 8	HOC; 15						8th	11
1979	San Remo Racing	March 782	BMW	SIL; 6	HOC; 10	THR; 3	NÜR; Ret	VLL; 8	MUG; 7	PAU; 7	HOC; NC	ZAN; 4	PER; Ret	MIS; 10	DON; Ret						13th	8
1980	Sanremo Racing	March 782	BMW	THR; Ret	HOC; 3	NÜR; 9	VLL; 6	PAU; 6	SIL; 17	ZOL; 14	MUG; 9		PER; Ret								10th	9
1980	Sanremo Racing	Toleman TG280	Hart									ZAN; 8		MIS; 6	HOC; 5						10th	9

=== Complete Formula One World Championship results ===
(key)

Year	Entrant	Chassis	Engine	1	2	3	4	5	6	7	8	9	10	11	12	13	14	15	16	WDC	Pts
1978	ATS Racing Team	ATS HS1	Ford Cosworth DFV 3.0 V8	ARG	BRA	RSA	USW	MON	BEL; DNQ	ESP; DNQ	SWE	FRA	GBR	GER	AUT	NED				NC	0
1978	Team Merzario	Merzario A1	Ford Cosworth DFV 3.0 V8														ITA; DNPQ	USA	CAN	NC	0

=== Complete British Formula One Championship results ===
(key) (Races in bold indicate pole position; races in italics indicate fastest lap)

Year	Entrant	Chassis	Engine	1	2	3	4	5	6	7	8	9	10	11	12	Pos.	Pts
1980	Sanremo Racing	March 782	BMW	OUL	BRH	SIL	MAL	THR	MNZ; Ret	MAL	SNE	BRH	THR	OUL	SIL	NC	0

Sporting positions
Preceded by Carlo Giorgio	Italian Formula Three Champion; 1974	Succeeded by Luciano Pavesi
