= Arrows A6 =

Formula One Car

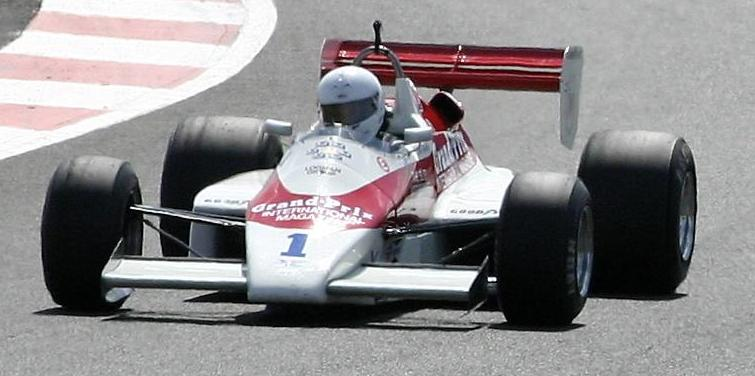
- The A6 at the 2008 Silverstone Classic
- Category: Formula One
- Constructor: Arrows
- Designer: Dave Wass
- Predecessor: A5
- Successor: A7

Technical specifications
- Chassis: Aluminium monocoque
- Suspension (front): Double wishbones, springs
- Suspension (rear): Double wishbones, springs
- Axle track: Front: 1,791 mm (70.5 in); Rear: 1,670 mm (66 in)
- Wheelbase: 2,692 mm (106.0 in)
- Engine: Cosworth DFY, 2,993 cc (182.6 cu in), 90° V8, NA, mid-engine, longitudinally mounted
- Transmission: Hewland FGA 5-speed manual
- Fuel: Valvoline
- Tyres: Goodyear

Competition history
- Notable entrants: Arrows Racing Team
- Notable drivers: (Switzerland) Marc Surer (Brazil) Chico Serra (Australia) Alan Jones (Belgium) Thierry Boutsen
- Debut: 1983 Brazilian Grand Prix
- Last event: 1984 Detroit Grand Prix
Races	Wins	Poles	F/Laps
23	0	0	0
- Constructors' Championships: 0
- Drivers' Championships: 0

The Arrows A6 was a Formula One car which the Arrows team used to compete in the 1983 and 1984 Formula One seasons. It was designed by Dave Wass and powered by the Cosworth DFY V8 engine. The A6 used a honeycomb monocoque frame, as a carbon fibre chassis was too expensive.

Drivers of the A6 at various times included Marc Surer, Chico Serra, Thierry Boutsen and 1980 World Drivers' Champion Alan Jones. The A6 was replaced during the 1984 season by the team's first turbocharged car, the A7.

An Arrows A6 was entered by Roger Cowman in the 1985 Formula 3000 championship for Slim Borgudd.

The A6 was later entered in the FIA Historic F1 Championship, winning the Championship in 2006 and 2007 with Steve Hartley.

== Complete Formula One results ==
(key)

Year	Entrant	Engine	Tyres	Driver	1	2	3	4	5	6	7	8	9	10	11	12	13	14	15	16	Pts.	WCC
1983	Arrows Racing Team	Ford Cosworth DFV 3.0 V8	G		BRA	USW	FRA	SMR	MON	BEL	DET	CAN	GBR	GER	AUT	NED	ITA	EUR	RSA		4	10th
1983	Arrows Racing Team	Ford Cosworth DFV 3.0 V8	G	Marc Surer	6	5	10	6	Ret	11	11	Ret	17	7	Ret	8	10	Ret	8		4	10th
1983	Arrows Racing Team	Ford Cosworth DFV 3.0 V8	G	Chico Serra	9		Ret	8	7												4	10th
1983	Arrows Racing Team	Ford Cosworth DFV 3.0 V8	G	Alan Jones		Ret															4	10th
1983	Arrows Racing Team	Ford Cosworth DFV 3.0 V8	G	Thierry Boutsen						Ret	7	7	15	9	13	14	Ret	11	9		4	10th
1984	Barclay Nordica Arrows	Ford Cosworth DFV 3.0 V8	G		BRA	RSA	BEL	SMR	FRA	MON	CAN	DET	DAL	GBR	GER	AUT	NED	ITA	EUR	POR	3	10th
1984	Barclay Nordica Arrows	Ford Cosworth DFV 3.0 V8	G	Marc Surer	7	9	8		Ret	DNQ	Ret	Ret									3	10th
1984	Barclay Nordica Arrows	Ford Cosworth DFV 3.0 V8	G	Thierry Boutsen	6	12		5													3	10th

== See also ==
- Historic Formula One Championship
- 1983 Race of Champions
