= Arrows A5 =

Formula One Car

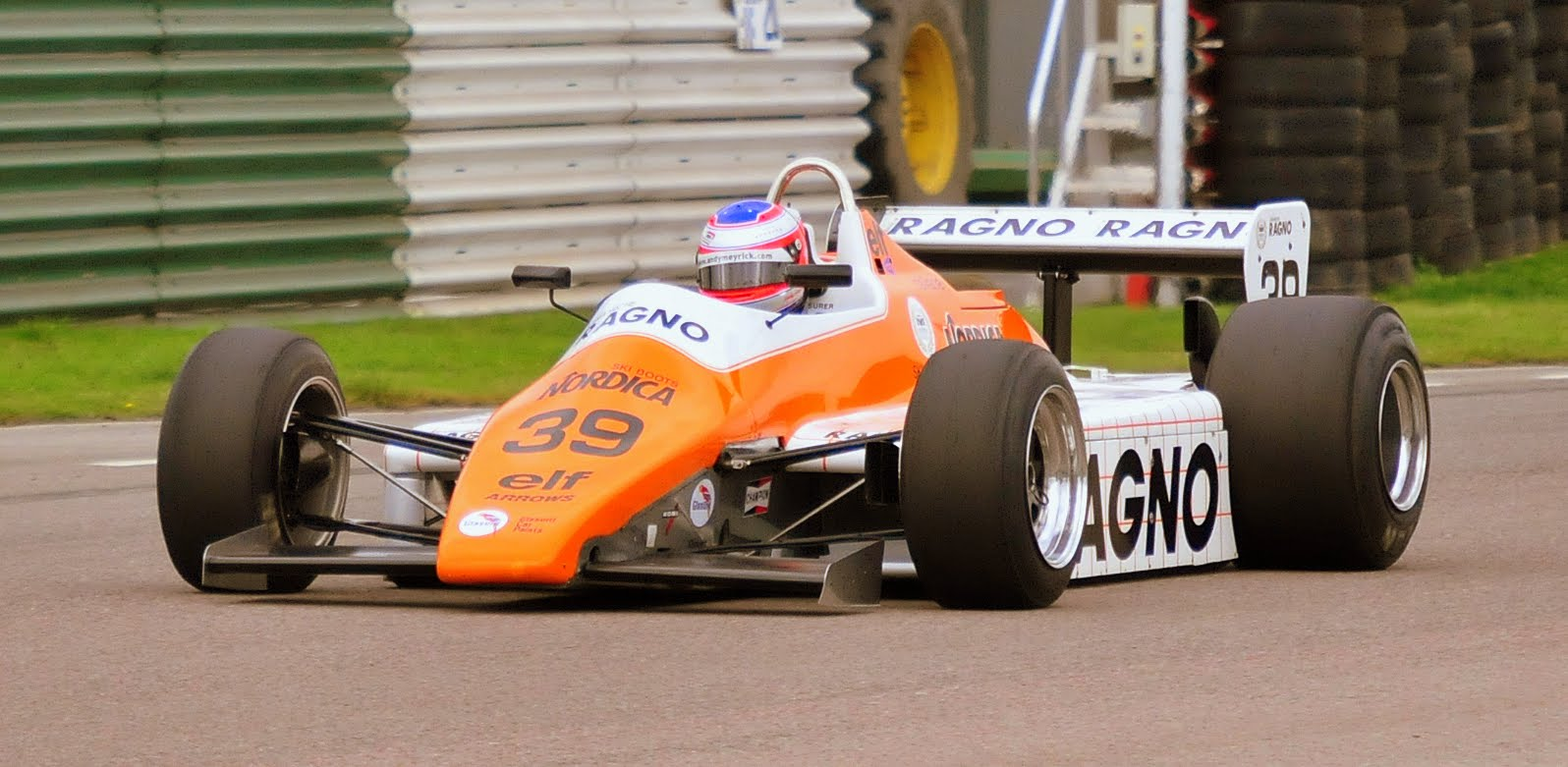
- The A5 at Mallory Park
- Category: Formula One
- Constructor: Arrows
- Designer: Dave Wass
- Predecessor: A4
- Successor: A6

Technical specifications
- Chassis: Aluminium monocoque
- Suspension (front): Double wishbones, springs
- Suspension (rear): Double wishbones, springs
- Axle track: Front: 1,800 mm (71 in); Rear: 1,650 mm (65 in)
- Wheelbase: 2,590 mm (102 in)
- Engine: Cosworth DFV, 2,993 cc (182.6 cu in), 90° V8, NA, mid-engine, longitudinally mounted
- Transmission: Hewland FGA 400 5-speed manual
- Weight: 540 kg (1,190 lb)
- Fuel: Elf
- Tyres: Pirelli

Competition history
- Notable entrants: Arrows Racing Team
- Notable drivers: (Switzerland) Marc Surer (Italy) Mauro Baldi
- Debut: 1982 Swiss Grand Prix
- Last event: 1982 Caesars Palace Grand Prix
Races	Wins	Poles	F/Laps
3	0	0	0
- Constructors' Championships: 0
- Drivers' Championships: 0

The Arrows A5 was the car which the Arrows Formula One team used to compete in the 1982 Formula One season. The A5 appeared late in the season, and was primarily a development car, with the lessons learned to be applied to the A6 for the upcoming 1983 Formula One season.

== Complete Formula One results ==
(key)

Year	Entrant	Engine	Tyres	Drivers	1	2	3	4	5	6	7	8	9	10	11	12	13	14	15	16	Pts.	WCC
1982	Arrows Racing Team	Cosworth DFV; V8 NA	P		RSA	BRA	USW	SMR	BEL	MON	DET	CAN	NED	GBR	FRA	GER	AUT	SUI	ITA	CPL	5*	11th
1982	Arrows Racing Team	Cosworth DFV; V8 NA	P	Mauro Baldi															12		5*	11th
1982	Arrows Racing Team	Cosworth DFV; V8 NA	P	Marc Surer														15		7	5*	11th

- All points scored with the Arrows A4
