= Arrows A4 =

Formula One Car

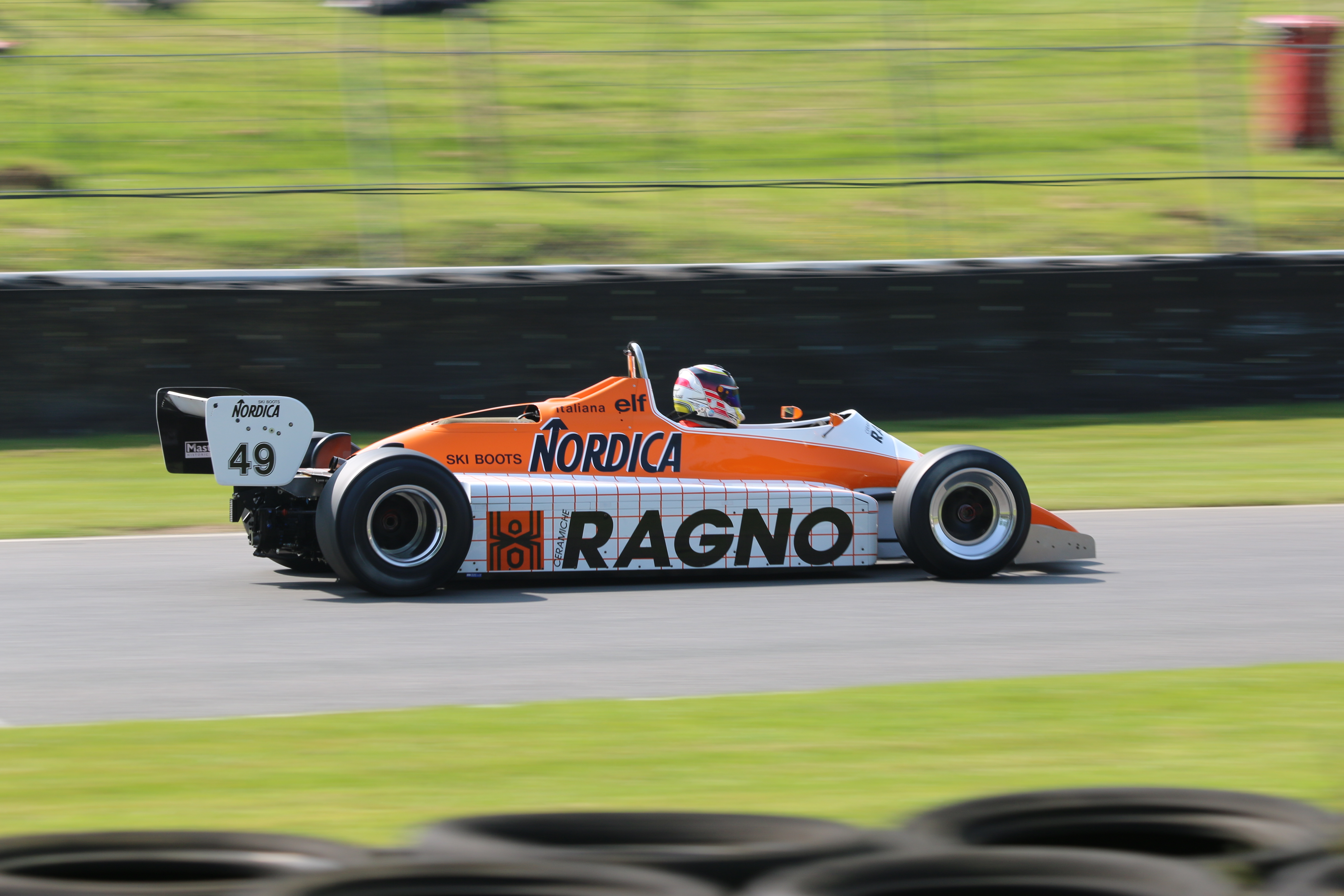
- The A4 on exhibition in 2018
- Category: Formula One
- Constructor: Arrows
- Designer: Dave Wass
- Predecessor: A3
- Successor: A5

Technical specifications
- Chassis: Aluminium monocoque
- Suspension (front): Double wishbones, springs
- Suspension (rear): Double wishbones, springs
- Axle track: Front: 1,778 mm (70.0 in); Rear: 1,626 mm (64.0 in)
- Wheelbase: 2,705 mm (106.5 in)
- Engine: Cosworth DFV, 2,993 cc (182.6 cu in), 90° V8, NA, mid-engine, longitudinally mounted
- Transmission: Hewland FGA 400 5/6-speed manual
- Weight: 580 kg (1,280 lb)
- Fuel: Elf
- Tyres: Pirelli

Competition history
- Notable entrants: Arrows Racing Team
- Notable drivers: (Switzerland) Marc Surer (Italy) Mauro Baldi (United Kingdom) Brian Henton
- Debut: 1982 South African Grand Prix
- Last event: 1982 Caesars Palace Grand Prix
Races	Wins	Poles	F/Laps
15	0	0	0
- Constructors' Championships: 0
- Drivers' Championships: 0

The Arrows A4 was the car which the Arrows Formula One team used to compete in the 1982 Formula One season.

The A4 was later used in the FIA Historic F1 Championship, winning the 2014 Championship.

== Complete Formula One results ==
(key)

Year	Entrant	Engine	Tyres	Drivers	1	2	3	4	5	6	7	8	9	10	11	12	13	14	15	16	Pts.	WCC
1982	Arrows Racing Team	Cosworth DFV; V8 NA	P		RSA	BRA	USW	SMR	BEL	MON	DET	CAN	NED	GBR	FRA	GER	AUT	SUI	ITA	CPL	5	11th
1982	Arrows Racing Team	Cosworth DFV; V8 NA	P	Brian Henton	DNQ	DNQ	Ret														5	11th
1982	Arrows Racing Team	Cosworth DFV; V8 NA	P	Mauro Baldi	DNQ	10	DNQ		Ret	DNQ	Ret	8	6	9	Ret	Ret	6	DNQ		11	5	11th
1982	Arrows Racing Team	Cosworth DFV; V8 NA	P	Marc Surer					7	9	8	5	10	Ret	13	6	Ret		Ret		5	11th
