= Christina Surer =

Swiss racing driver

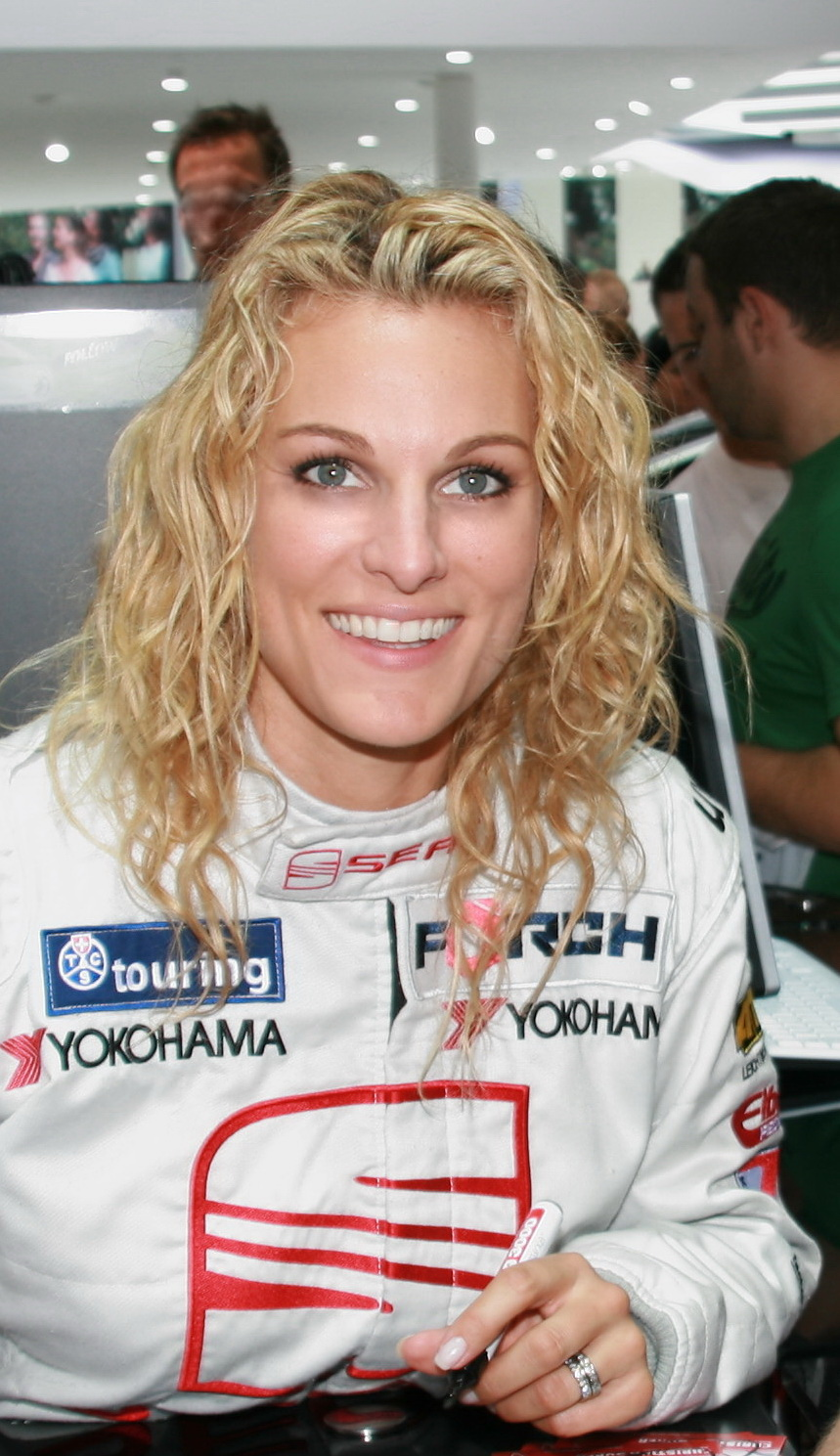
Surer in 2009

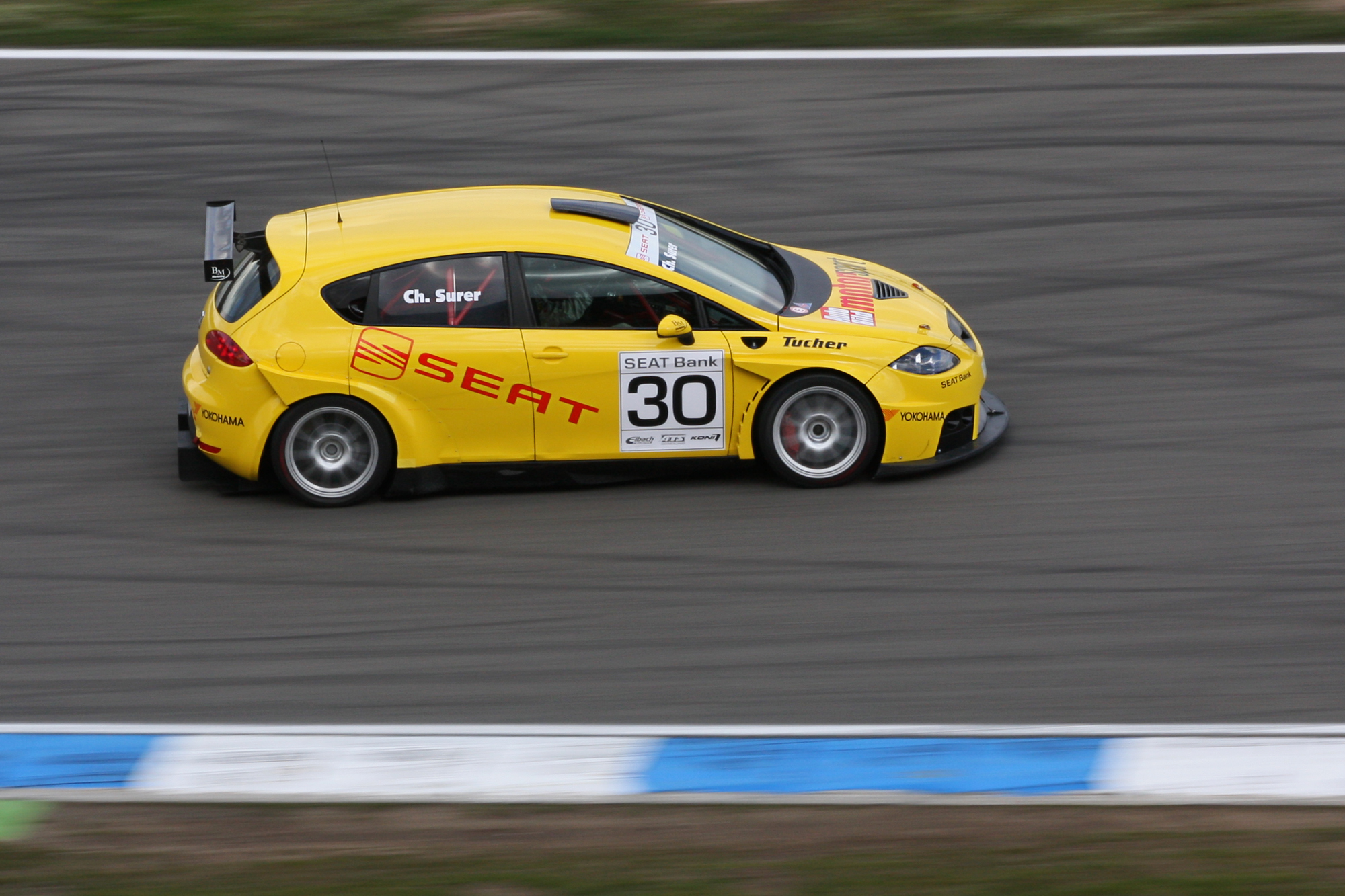
Christina Surer at the SEAT Leon Supercopa in 2008

Christina Surer (born 26 March 1974) is a Swiss race car driver. She spent several years in go-karts before participating in the Ford Superseries (2002), Alfa 147 Cup (2002) and the Ford Fiesta Cup (2003). She has participated in two 24 Hours Nürburgring races (2004, 2005) and since 2004, has been racing in the SEAT Leon Supercopa.

Surer has modelled for Playboy and was married to Formula One driver Marc Surer from 1997 to 2000.
