= Arrows A7 =

Formula One racing car

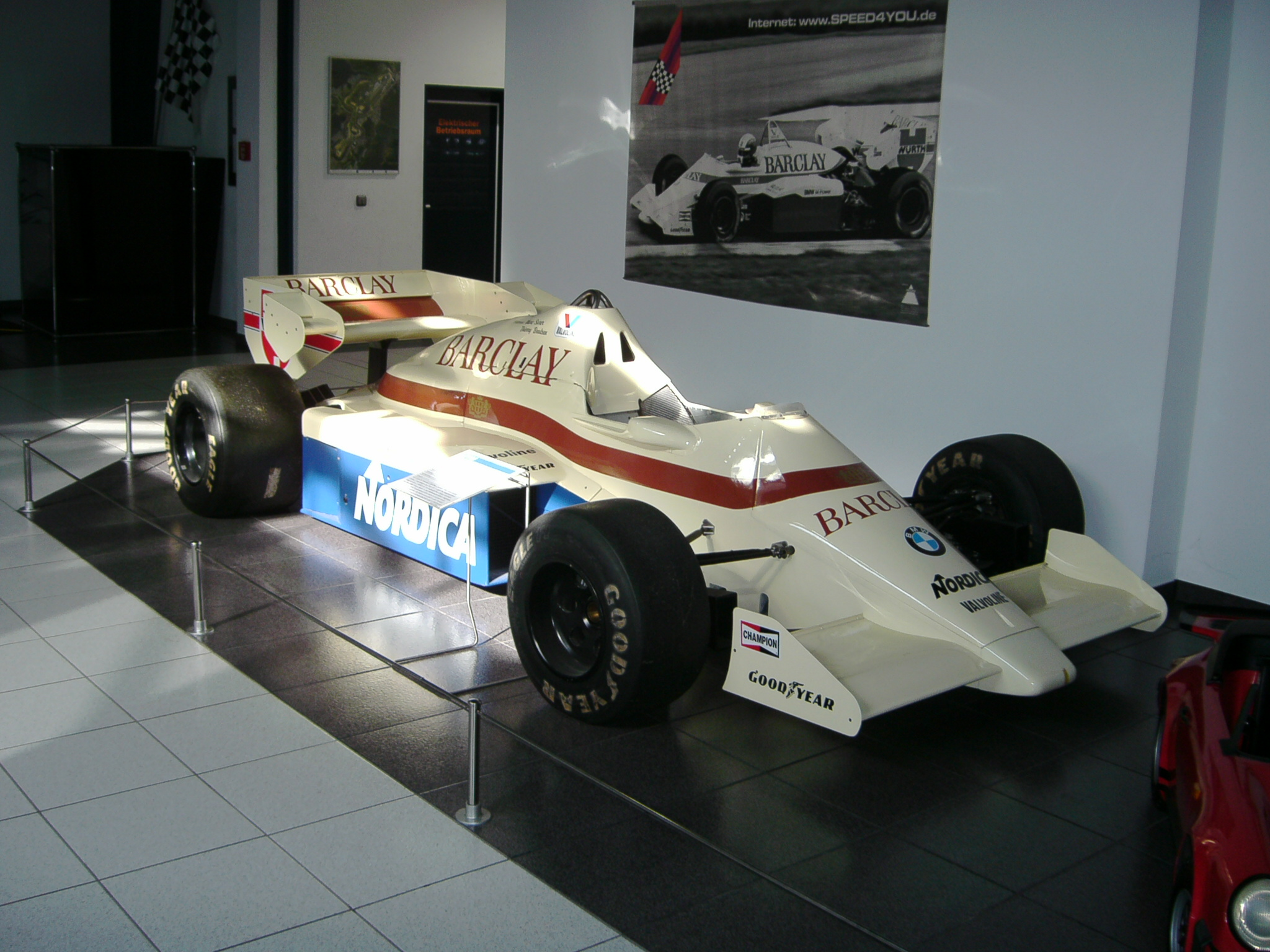
- The A7
- Category: Formula One
- Constructor: Arrows
- Designer: Dave Wass
- Predecessor: A6
- Successor: A8

Technical specifications
- Chassis: Aluminium monocoque
- Suspension (front): Double wishbones, push-rod dampers
- Suspension (rear): Double wishbones
- Axle track: Front: 1,727 mm (68.0 in); Rear: 1,600 mm (63 in)
- Wheelbase: 2,667 mm (105.0 in)
- Engine: BMW M12/13, 1,499 cc (91.5 cu in), Straight 4, turbo, mid-engine, longitudinally mounted
- Transmission: Arrows / Hewland 5-speed manual
- Fuel: Valvoline
- Tyres: Goodyear

Competition history
- Notable entrants: Barclay Nordica Arrows BMW
- Notable drivers: 17. (Switzerland) Marc Surer; 18. (Belgium) Thierry Boutsen
- Debut: 1984 Belgian Grand Prix
- Last event: 1984 Portuguese Grand Prix
Races	Wins	Poles	F/Laps
14	0	0	0
- Constructors' Championships: 0
- Drivers' Championships: 0

The Arrows A7 was a Formula One car which the Arrows team used to compete in the 1984 Formula One season. The car made its debut at the 1984 Belgian Grand Prix held that year at Zolder. Driven by versatile Swiss fast man Marc Surer and Belgian Thierry Boutsen, the A7 scored only 3 points when Boutsen and Surer finished 5th and 6th respectively in the 1984 Austrian Grand Prix.

The A7 was the team's first time running a turbocharged engine. This was the same powerful BMW M12 Straight 4 which was also used by the Brabham team, though unlike Brabham who had BMW engineers looking after their engines, the Arrows engines were maintained and developed by Swiss engine guru Heini Mader. This left Arrows with around 800 bhp (597 kW; 811 PS) while the factory units were developing around 900 bhp (671 kW; 912 PS)

in the 9/1984 Sport Auto they found the Arrows A7 had a performance of:

0 - 40 kph	1.1 s
0 - 60 kph	1.8 s
0 - 80 kph	2.4 s
0 - 100 kph	3.1 s
0 - 120 kph	3.8 s
0 - 140 kph	4.7 s
0 - 180 kph	5.8 s
0 - 200 kph	6.4 s
1000 m	16.6 s

== Complete Formula One results ==
(key)

Year	Entrant	Engine	Tyres	Drivers	1	2	3	4	5	6	7	8	9	10	11	12	13	14	15	16	Points	WCC
1984	Barclay Nordica Arrows BMW	BMW M12/13; S4 tc	G		BRA	RSA	BEL	SMR	FRA	MON	CAN	DET	DAL	GBR	GER	AUT	NED	ITA	EUR	POR	3	11th
1984	Barclay Nordica Arrows BMW	BMW M12/13; S4 tc	G	Thierry Boutsen			Ret		11	DNQ	Ret	Ret	Ret	Ret	Ret	5	Ret	10	9	Ret	3	11th
1984	Barclay Nordica Arrows BMW	BMW M12/13; S4 tc	G	Marc Surer				Ret					Ret	11	Ret	6	Ret	Ret	Ret	Ret	3	11th
