= 1984 Monaco Grand Prix =

Coordinates: 43°44′4.74″N 7°25′16.8″E

- Race 6 of 16 in the 1984 Formula One World Championship
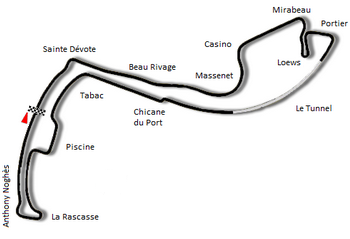

Race details
- Date: 3 June 1984
- Location: Circuit de Monaco, Monte Carlo, Monaco
- Course: Street circuit
- Course length: 3.312 km (2.057 miles)
- Distance: 31 laps, 102.672 km (63.737 miles)
- Scheduled distance: 76 laps, 251.712 km (156.406 miles)
- Weather: Heavy rain and spray

Pole position
Driver	(France) Alain Prost	McLaren-TAG
- Time: 1:22.661

Fastest lap
Driver	(Brazil) Ayrton Senna	Toleman-Hart
- Time: 1:54.334 on lap 24

Podium
First	(France) Alain Prost	McLaren-TAG
Second	(Brazil) Ayrton Senna	Toleman-Hart
Third	(France) René Arnoux	Ferrari

The 1984 Monaco Grand Prix was a Formula One motor race held at Monaco on 3 June 1984. It was race 6 of 16 in the 1984 FIA Formula One World Championship. It was the only race of the 1984 championship that was run in wet weather.

Alain Prost won the rain-curtailed race from pole position. Ayrton Senna was second in his first podium in Formula One. René Arnoux was later promoted to third after the disqualification of Stefan Bellof.

== Practice ==
During practice, Tyrrell's Martin Brundle had a huge crash at the Tabac corner. He landed upside down and was slightly injured, but it was enough to make him a non-qualifier for the race. Brundle later said that he ran back to the pits and had actually gotten into the spare car before team boss Ken Tyrrell got on the radio and asked him if he was OK after the accident. It was then discovered that Brundle could not actually remember how he returned to the pits, so the boss wisely would not allow Brundle to go back onto the track and ordered him out of the car. He then took Brundle to see Formula One medical chief Sid Watkins, who after an examination concluded that the rookie driver was slightly concussed and the decision was made to withdraw him from the race weekend.

== Qualifying ==
Alain Prost took his first pole position for McLaren with a time of 1:22.661, just ahead of the Lotus-Renault of Nigel Mansell. Prost's pole was also the first pole for the McLaren MP4/2 as well as for the TAG-Porsche engine. Stefan Bellof was the only non-turbo qualifier in his Tyrrell-Cosworth. Bellof qualified 20th and last while Brundle's crash behind the pits at Tabac saw him as a spectator for the race. Bellof's time edged the Arrows-Ford of Marc Surer by just 0.156. The turbo cars of Eddie Cheever (Alfa Romeo) and Thierry Boutsen (Arrows-BMW) both failed to qualify.

BMW had built specially detuned engines for Brabham to use at Monaco. Instead of the normal 900 bhp (671 kW; 912 PS) engines, the Brabhams only had around 700 bhp (522 kW; 710 PS) to play with, the theory being that full power was not needed at Monaco and the detuned engines would be more drivable. It was also an attempt at better reliability as the team had yet to score a point for the year. Never at ease at Monaco, reigning World Champion Nelson Piquet qualified 9th. With Teo Fabi having commitments to race the US based IndyCars at Milwaukee on the same weekend his brother Corrado Fabi drove the second Brabham, qualifying 15th.

== Race ==
The race, held amidst heavy rain, was one of the most contentious in Formula One history, and announced the emergence of at least two new stars. Alain Prost took the first of his four victories at the circuit.

The race start was delayed by 45 minutes due to the heavy rain. With the rain soaking the track, Niki Lauda sought out Bernie Ecclestone on the grid in a bid to have the tunnel flooded as well. The tunnel was dry but coated with oil from the previous days' use (as well as from the historic cars which were on the program that weekend) which Lauda explained had turned it into a fifth gear skid pad when the cars came racing in carrying the spray from their tyres in the morning warmup. Ecclestone used his power as the head of the Formula One Constructors Association to do exactly that, with a local fire truck called in to water down the only dry road on the track.

Pole-sitter Prost led the race from the start, while first corner contact between Ferrari's René Arnoux and the Renault of Derek Warwick pitched Warwick's car into the fence on the outside of St. Devote and into the path of his team-mate Patrick Tambay. Both drivers suffered leg injuries; Warwick bruised his left leg while Tambay broke his leg after his car's suspension punched through the carbon fibre monocoque, causing him to miss the next round in Canada.

Prost was passed on lap nine by Nigel Mansell, to lead a Grand Prix for the first time, when Prost's TAG engine was misfiring and he was delayed by both Corrado Fabi's stalled Brabham and Michele Alboreto's about-to-be-lapped Ferrari just before the tunnel (Prost actually hit a marshal who was pushing Fabi's car away but with no serious injury). Mansell pulled away from Prost at around two seconds per lap, before going off six laps later on the run up to Casino Square after sliding on a painted white line, damaging his car and retiring from the race.

Lauda disposed of Arnoux but Prost assumed the lead again, only to have the Toleman-Hart of Ayrton Senna, who had also passed the Ferrari, quickly closing in. Senna had started thirteenth in the generally uncompetitive Toleman, in the first Formula One street race in his rookie season, and was showing his wet weather skills that would become legendary. On lap 29, Prost waved to the stewards of the race to indicate that he felt the race should be stopped. He was also suffering from a major brake imbalance as his McLaren's carbon brakes were locking due to not generating enough heat in the conditions, the same problem that had caused Lauda to spin at Casino Square on lap 23, whereupon he stalled his engine and was out of the race. A slowing Prost waved again on lap 31 as he passed the start/finish line.

The red flag to stop the race was shown at the end of the 32nd lap after clerk of the course Jacky Ickx decided that conditions were too poor for the race to continue. Senna passed Prost's slowing McLaren before the finish line, but according to the rules, the positions counted are those from the last lap completed by every driver – lap 31, at which point Prost was still leading. The stoppage was controversial, as it benefited Prost with a Porsche-designed engine, and was made by Ickx, the lead driver with the factory run Rothmans Porsche team in sports car racing. Ickx was suspended from his race control duties for not consulting with the stewards over his decision before making it.

Stefan Bellof, running in the only naturally aspirated car in the race, finished third. Bellof had qualified 20th and last in his Tyrrell 012-Cosworth. His drive from last to third was a stand-out achievement in his short career, although he was later disqualified due to weight restrictions broken by Tyrrell. His drive led to negotiations with Ferrari for a drive for 1986 alongside Michele Alboreto, as René Arnoux was under contract in 1985. The Tyrrell team's results were erased later in the season due to weight infringements, meaning that Bellof was stripped of his podium finish, with his place being taken by René Arnoux. It would prove to be Bellof's only podium visit during his Formula One career.

This was the first time that Ayrton Senna had set a Formula One fastest lap. It was also Toleman's second and final fastest lap in Formula One (Derek Warwick had set the team's only other fastest lap during the 1982 Dutch Grand Prix at Zandvoort).

== Classification ==
=== Qualifying ===
Pos	No	Driver	Constructor	Q1	Q2	Gap
1	7	(France) Alain Prost	McLaren-TAG	1:23.944	1:22.661	
2	12	(United Kingdom) Nigel Mansell	Lotus-Renault	1:24.927	1:22.752	+0.091
3	28	(France) René Arnoux	Ferrari	1:24.661	1:22.935	+0.274
4	27	(Italy) Michele Alboreto	Ferrari	1:23.581	1:22.937	+0.276
5	16	(United Kingdom) Derek Warwick	Renault	1:23.726	1:23.237	+0.576
6	15	(France) Patrick Tambay	Renault	1:24.828	1:23.414	+0.753
7	26	(Italy) Andrea de Cesaris	Ligier-Renault	1:25.939	1:23.578	+0.917
8	8	(Austria) Niki Lauda	McLaren-TAG	1:24.508	1:23.886	+1.225
9	1	(Brazil) Nelson Piquet	Brabham-BMW	1:24.139	1:23.918	+1.257
10	6	(Finland) Keke Rosberg	Williams-Honda	1:26.017	1:24.151	+1.490
11	11	(Italy) Elio de Angelis	Lotus-Renault	1:25.602	1:24.426	+1.765
12	14	(West Germany) Manfred Winkelhock	ATS-BMW	1:52.889	1:24.473	+1.812
13	19	(Brazil) Ayrton Senna	Toleman-Hart	1:27.865	1:25.009	+2.348
14	22	(Italy) Riccardo Patrese	Alfa Romeo	1:28.072	1:25.101	+2.440
15	2	(Italy) Corrado Fabi	Brabham-BMW	1:31.618	1:25.290	+2.629
16	5	(France) Jacques Laffite	Williams-Honda	1:27.356	1:25.719	+3.058
17	25	(France) François Hesnault	Ligier-Renault	1:27.678	1:25.815	+3.154
18	20	(Venezuela) Johnny Cecotto	Toleman-Hart	1:28.241	1:25.872	+3.211
19	24	(Italy) Piercarlo Ghinzani	Osella-Alfa Romeo	1:27.723	1:25.877	+3.216
20	4	(West Germany) Stefan Bellof	Tyrrell-Ford	1:27.834	1:26.117	+3.456
21	17	(Switzerland) Marc Surer	Arrows-Ford	1:27.919	1:26.273	+3.612
22	3	(United Kingdom) Martin Brundle	Tyrrell-Ford	1:27.891	1:26.373	+3.712
23	23	(United States) Eddie Cheever	Alfa Romeo	1:28.961	1:26.471	+3.810
24	18	(Belgium) Thierry Boutsen	Arrows-BMW	1:28.000	1:26.514	+3.853
25	10	(United Kingdom) Jonathan Palmer	RAM-Hart	1:29.778	1:27.458	+4.797
26	21	(Italy) Mauro Baldi	Spirit-Hart	1:28.360	1:30.146	+5.699
27	9	(France) Philippe Alliot	RAM-Hart	1:29.637	1:29.576	+6.915

*Positions with a pink background indicate drivers that failed to qualify

=== Race ===
Pos	No	Driver	Constructor	Tyre	Laps	Time/Retired	Grid	Points
1	7	(France) Alain Prost	McLaren-TAG	MI	31	1:01:07.740	1	4.5
2	19	(Brazil) Ayrton Senna	Toleman-Hart	MI	31	+ 7.446	13	3
3	28	(France) René Arnoux	Ferrari	G	31	+ 29.077	3	2
4	6	(Finland) Keke Rosberg	Williams-Honda	G	31	+ 35.246	10	1.5
5	11	(Italy) Elio de Angelis	Lotus-Renault	G	31	+ 44.439	11	1
6	27	(Italy) Michele Alboreto	Ferrari	G	30	+ 1 Lap	4	0.5
7	24	(Italy) Piercarlo Ghinzani	Osella-Alfa Romeo	P	30	+ 1 Lap	19	
8	5	(France) Jacques Laffite	Williams-Honda	G	30	+ 1 Lap	16	
DSQ	4	(West Germany) Stefan Bellof	Tyrrell-Ford	G	31	Underweight car (+21.141)	20	
Ret	22	(Italy) Riccardo Patrese	Alfa Romeo	G	24	Steering	14	
Ret	8	(Austria) Niki Lauda	McLaren-TAG	MI	23	Spun Off	8	
Ret	14	(West Germany) Manfred Winkelhock	ATS-BMW	P	22	Spun Off	12	
Ret	12	(United Kingdom) Nigel Mansell	Lotus-Renault	G	15	Spun Off	2	
Ret	1	(Brazil) Nelson Piquet	Brabham-BMW	MI	14	Electrical	9	
Ret	25	(France) François Hesnault	Ligier-Renault	MI	12	Electrical	17	
Ret	2	(Italy) Corrado Fabi	Brabham-BMW	MI	9	Electrical	15	
Ret	20	(Venezuela) Johnny Cecotto	Toleman-Hart	MI	1	Spun Off	18	
Ret	16	(United Kingdom) Derek Warwick	Renault	MI	0	Collision	5	
Ret	15	(France) Patrick Tambay	Renault	MI	0	Collision	6	
Ret	26	(Italy) Andrea de Cesaris	Ligier-Renault	MI	0	Accident	7	
DNQ	17	(Switzerland) Marc Surer	Arrows-Ford	G				
DNQ	3	(United Kingdom) Martin Brundle	Tyrrell-Ford	G				
DNQ	23	(United States) Eddie Cheever	Alfa Romeo	G				
DNQ	18	(Belgium) Thierry Boutsen	Arrows-BMW	G				
DNQ	10	(United Kingdom) Jonathan Palmer	RAM-Hart	P				
DNQ	21	(Italy) Mauro Baldi	Spirit-Hart	P				
DNQ	9	(France) Philippe Alliot	RAM-Hart	P				

- Stefan Bellof originally finished 3rd in his Tyrrell but was later disqualified due to weight restrictions broken by Tyrrell.

== Championship standings after the race ==
Drivers' Championship standings

Pos	Driver	Points
1	(France) Alain Prost	28.5
2	(Austria) Niki Lauda	18
3	(France) René Arnoux	14.5
4	(United Kingdom) Derek Warwick	13
5	(Italy) Elio de Angelis	12.5

Constructors' Championship standings

Pos	Constructor	Points
1	(United Kingdom) McLaren-TAG	46.5
2	(Italy) Ferrari	23.5
3	(France) Renault	20
4	(United Kingdom) Lotus-Renault	16.5
5	(United Kingdom) Williams-Honda	11

- Note: Only the top five positions are included for both sets of standings. Points accurate at final declaration of results. Tyrrell and its drivers were subsequently disqualified from 1984 results and their points reallocated.

Previous race: 1984 French Grand Prix	FIA Formula One World Championship; 1984 season	Next race: 1984 Canadian Grand Prix
Previous race: 1983 Monaco Grand Prix	Monaco Grand Prix	Next race: 1985 Monaco Grand Prix
