= 1984 Formula One World Championship =

38th season of FIA Formula One motor racing

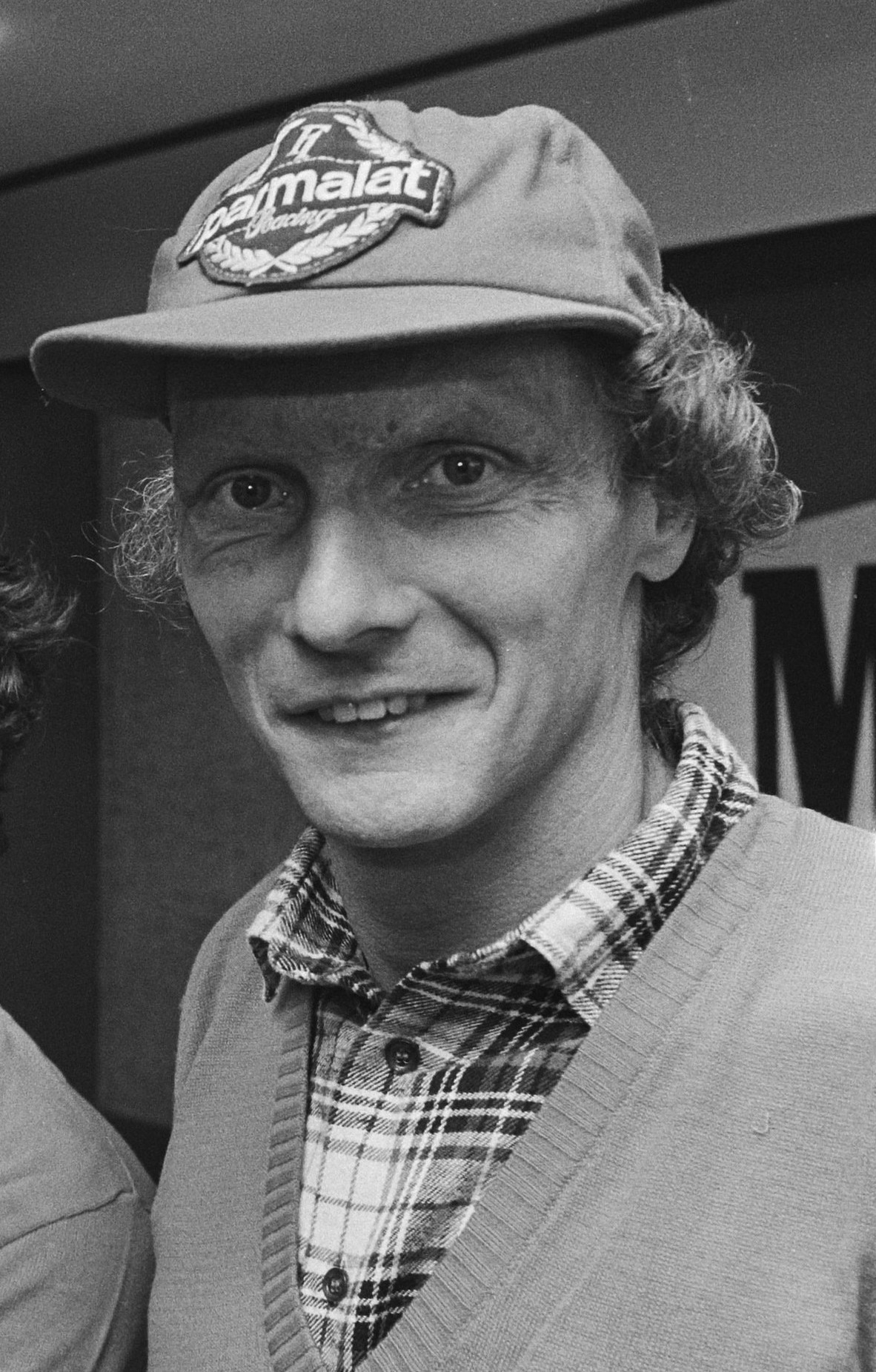
Niki Lauda won his third and final Drivers' Championship with McLaren. His first title since 1977.

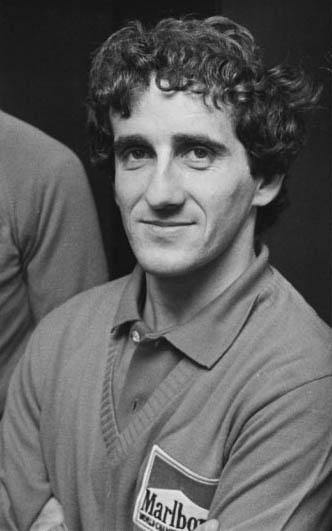
Lauda's teammate Alain Prost was runner-up by half a point.

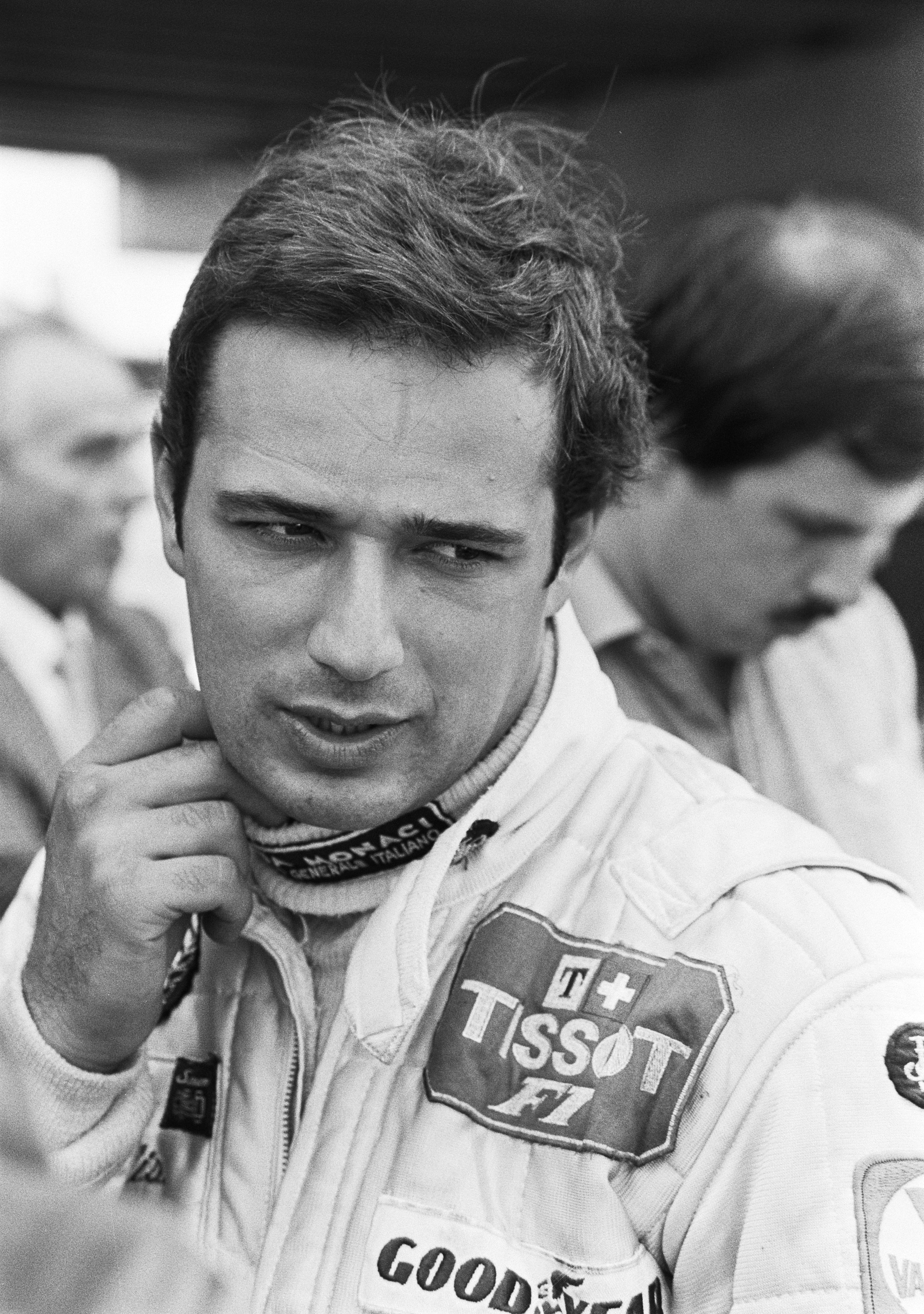
Elio de Angelis finished third, driving for Lotus.

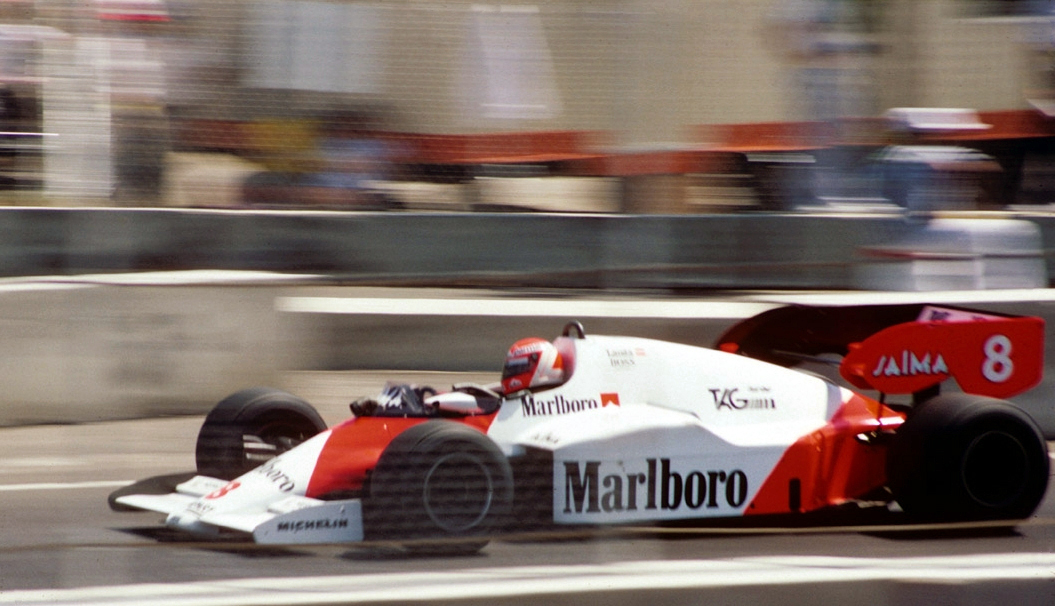
McLaren took the 1984 Formula 1 World Championship for Manufacturers after winning 12 of the 16 races.

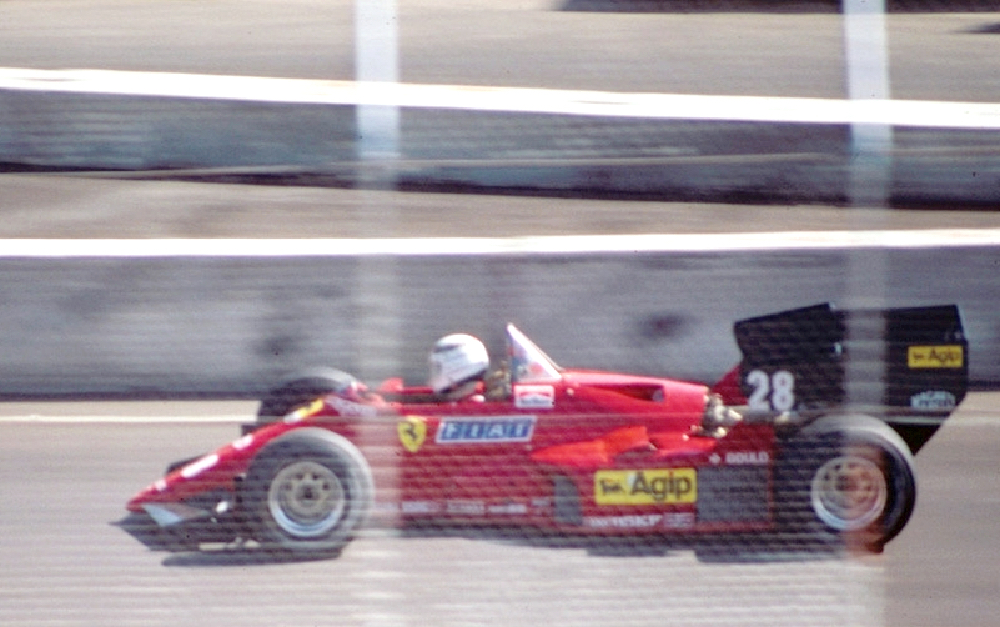
Ferrari finished second in the 1984 Formula 1 World Championship for Manufacturers.

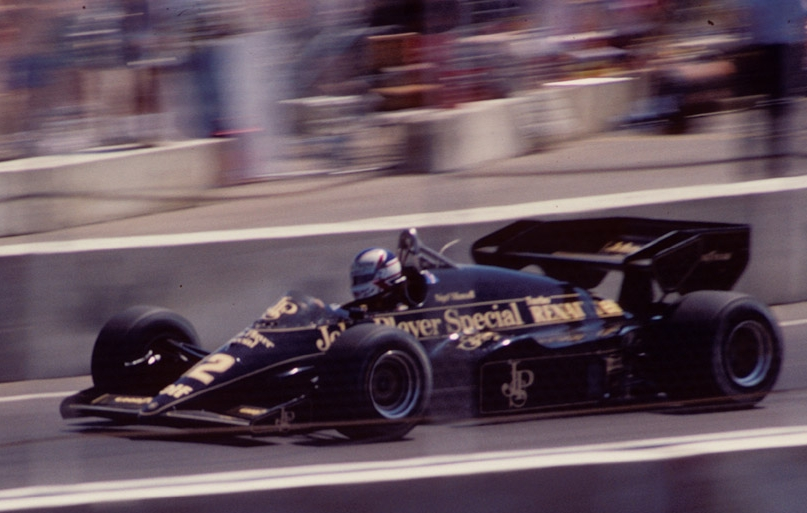
Lotus finished third in the 1984 Formula 1 World Championship for Manufacturers.

The 1984 FIA Formula One World Championship was the 38th season of Fédération Internationale de l'Automobile (FIA) Formula One motor racing. It featured the 1984 Formula One World Championship for Drivers and the 1984 Formula One World Championship for Manufacturers, both of which commenced on 25 March and ended on 21 October after sixteen races.

In the Drivers' Championship, McLaren teammates Alain Prost and Niki Lauda enjoyed a season-long duel. Prost won seven races to equal Jim Clark's record from 1963, over Lauda's five, but the Austrian eventually prevailed by half a point – the smallest margin in Formula One history. It was Lauda's third title, but his first since 1977, breaking the record of six years between World Championship victories set by Jack Brabham in 1966. Reigning champion Nelson Piquet finished fifth in the championship. The season also saw the debut of eventual three-time World Champion Ayrton Senna.

Brabham, Renault and Ferrari were the expected frontrunners, but it was McLaren who clinched the Constructors' Championship with a then-record margin. The combination of their talented drivers, the aerodynamics of the John Barnard-designed MP4/2 and the experience of engine supplier Porsche with fuel economy made them almost unbeatable, winning twelve of the sixteen Grands Prix. It was their first title since 1974.

As of 2025, this is the last championship for an Austrian Formula One driver. It is also the last time that the Drivers' Champion did not score a pole position during the season. Only Denny Hulme managed this earlier in 1967. This is also the last Formula One season to feature 3 tyre suppliers. This season would also mark Michelin's last involvement in the sport until they returned once more in 2001.

== Drivers and constructors ==
| Entrant | Constructor | Chassis | Engine | Tyres | No | Driver | Rounds |
|---|---|---|---|---|---|---|---|
| (United Kingdom) MRD International | Brabham-BMW | BT53 | BMW M12/13 1.5 L4t | M | 1 | (Brazil) Nelson Piquet | All |
| (United Kingdom) MRD International | Brabham-BMW | BT53 | BMW M12/13 1.5 L4t | M | 2 | (Italy) Teo Fabi | 1–5, 8, 10–15 |
| (United Kingdom) MRD International | Brabham-BMW | BT53 | BMW M12/13 1.5 L4t | M | 2 | (Italy) Corrado Fabi | 6–7, 9 |
| (United Kingdom) MRD International | Brabham-BMW | BT53 | BMW M12/13 1.5 L4t | M | 2 | (West Germany) Manfred Winkelhock | 16 |
| (United Kingdom) Tyrrell Racing Organisation | Tyrrell-Ford | 012 | Ford-Cosworth DFY 3.0 V8 | G | 3 | (United Kingdom) Martin Brundle | 1–9 |
| (United Kingdom) Tyrrell Racing Organisation | Tyrrell-Ford | 012 | Ford-Cosworth DFY 3.0 V8 | G | 3 | (Sweden) Stefan Johansson | 10–13 |
| (United Kingdom) Tyrrell Racing Organisation | Tyrrell-Ford | 012 | Ford-Cosworth DFY 3.0 V8 | G | 4 | (West Germany) Stefan Bellof | 1–10, 12–13 |
| (United Kingdom) Tyrrell Racing Organisation | Tyrrell-Ford | 012 | Ford-Cosworth DFY 3.0 V8 | G | 4 | (New Zealand) Mike Thackwell | 11 |
| (United Kingdom) Williams Grand Prix Engineering | Williams-Honda | FW09; FW09B | Honda RA163E 1.5 V6t; Honda RA164E 1.5 V6t | G | 5 | (France) Jacques Laffite | All |
| (United Kingdom) Williams Grand Prix Engineering | Williams-Honda | FW09; FW09B | Honda RA163E 1.5 V6t; Honda RA164E 1.5 V6t | G | 6 | (Finland) Keke Rosberg | All |
| (United Kingdom) Marlboro McLaren TAG Turbo | McLaren-TAG | MP4/2 | TAG-Porsche TTE PO1 1.5 V6t | M | 7 | (France) Alain Prost | All |
| (United Kingdom) Marlboro McLaren TAG Turbo | McLaren-TAG | MP4/2 | TAG-Porsche TTE PO1 1.5 V6t | M | 8 | (Austria) Niki Lauda | All |
| (United Kingdom) Skoal Bandit Formula 1 Team | RAM-Hart | 01; 02 | Hart 415T 1.5 L4t | P | 9 | (France) Philippe Alliot | All |
| (United Kingdom) Skoal Bandit Formula 1 Team | RAM-Hart | 01; 02 | Hart 415T 1.5 L4t | P | 10 | (United Kingdom) Jonathan Palmer | 1–6, 8–16 |
| (United Kingdom) Skoal Bandit Formula 1 Team | RAM-Hart | 01; 02 | Hart 415T 1.5 L4t | P | 10 | (New Zealand) Mike Thackwell | 7 |
| (United Kingdom) John Player Special Team Lotus | Lotus-Renault | 95T | Renault EF4B 1.5 V6t | G | 11 | (Italy) Elio de Angelis | All |
| (United Kingdom) John Player Special Team Lotus | Lotus-Renault | 95T | Renault EF4B 1.5 V6t | G | 12 | (United Kingdom) Nigel Mansell | All |
| (West Germany) Team ATS | ATS-BMW | D7 | BMW M12/13 1.5 L4t | P | 14 | (West Germany) Manfred Winkelhock | 1–14 |
| (West Germany) Team ATS | ATS-BMW | D7 | BMW M12/13 1.5 L4t | P | 14 | (Austria) Gerhard Berger | 16 |
| (West Germany) Team ATS | ATS-BMW | D7 | BMW M12/13 1.5 L4t | P | 31 | (Austria) Gerhard Berger | 12, 14–15 |
| (France) Équipe Renault Elf | Renault Elf | RE50 | Renault EF4B 1.5 V6t | M | 15 | (France) Patrick Tambay | All |
| (France) Équipe Renault Elf | Renault Elf | RE50 | Renault EF4B 1.5 V6t | M | 16 | (United Kingdom) Derek Warwick | All |
| (France) Équipe Renault Elf | Renault Elf | RE50 | Renault EF4B 1.5 V6t | M | 33 | (France) Philippe Streiff | 16 |
| (United Kingdom) Barclay Nordica Arrows | Arrows-Ford | A6 | Ford-Cosworth DFV 3.0 V8 | G | 17 | (Switzerland) Marc Surer | 1–3, 5, 7–8 |
| (United Kingdom) Barclay Nordica Arrows | Arrows-Ford | A6 | Ford-Cosworth DFV 3.0 V8 | G | 18 | (Belgium) Thierry Boutsen | 1–2, 4 |
| (United Kingdom) Barclay Nordica Arrows | Arrows-BMW | A7 | BMW M12/13 1.5 L4t | G | 17 | (Switzerland) Marc Surer | 4, 6, 9–16 |
| (United Kingdom) Barclay Nordica Arrows | Arrows-BMW | A7 | BMW M12/13 1.5 L4t | G | 18 | (Belgium) Thierry Boutsen | 3, 5–16 |
| (United Kingdom) Toleman Group Motorsport | Toleman-Hart | TG183B; TG184 | Hart 415T 1.5 L4t | P M | 19 | (Brazil) Ayrton Senna | 1–13, 15–16 |
| (United Kingdom) Toleman Group Motorsport | Toleman-Hart | TG183B; TG184 | Hart 415T 1.5 L4t | P M | 19 | (Sweden) Stefan Johansson | 14 |
| (United Kingdom) Toleman Group Motorsport | Toleman-Hart | TG183B; TG184 | Hart 415T 1.5 L4t | P M | 20 | (Venezuela) Johnny Cecotto | 1–10 |
| (United Kingdom) Toleman Group Motorsport | Toleman-Hart | TG183B; TG184 | Hart 415T 1.5 L4t | P M | 20 | (Italy) Pierluigi Martini | 14 |
| (United Kingdom) Toleman Group Motorsport | Toleman-Hart | TG183B; TG184 | Hart 415T 1.5 L4t | P M | 20 | (Sweden) Stefan Johansson | 15–16 |
| (United Kingdom) Spirit Racing | Spirit-Hart | 101 | Hart 415T 1.5 L4t | P | 21 | (Italy) Mauro Baldi | 1–6, 15–16 |
| (United Kingdom) Spirit Racing | Spirit-Hart | 101 | Hart 415T 1.5 L4t | P | 21 | (Netherlands) Huub Rothengatter | 7, 9–14 |
| (United Kingdom) Spirit Racing | Spirit-Ford | 101C | Ford-Cosworth DFV 3.0 V8 | P | 21 | (Netherlands) Huub Rothengatter | 8 |
| (Italy) Benetton Team Alfa Romeo | Alfa Romeo | 184T | Alfa Romeo 890T 1.5 V8t | G | 22 | (Italy) Riccardo Patrese | All |
| (Italy) Benetton Team Alfa Romeo | Alfa Romeo | 184T | Alfa Romeo 890T 1.5 V8t | G | 23 | (United States) Eddie Cheever | All |
| (Italy) Kelémata Osella | Osella-Alfa Romeo | FA1F | Alfa Romeo 890T 1.5 V8t | P | 24 | (Italy) Piercarlo Ghinzani | All |
| (Italy) Kelémata Osella | Osella-Alfa Romeo | FA1F | Alfa Romeo 890T 1.5 V8t | P | 30 | (Austria) Jo Gartner | 10–16 |
| (Italy) Kelémata Osella | Osella-Alfa Romeo | FA1E | Alfa Romeo 1260 3.0 V12 | P | 30 | (Austria) Jo Gartner | 4 |
| (France) Ligier Loto | Ligier-Renault | JS23; JS23B | Renault EF4 1.5 V6t | M | 25 | (France) François Hesnault | All |
| (France) Ligier Loto | Ligier-Renault | JS23; JS23B | Renault EF4 1.5 V6t | M | 26 | (Italy) Andrea de Cesaris | All |
| (Italy) Ferrari | Ferrari | 126C4 | Ferrari 031 1.5 V6t | G | 27 | (Italy) Michele Alboreto | All |
| (Italy) Ferrari | Ferrari | 126C4 | Ferrari 031 1.5 V6t | G | 28 | (France) René Arnoux | All |

=== Team changes ===
- At the end of the 1983 season, Theodore Racing had left Formula 1. No new manufacturers entered the grid for 1984.

==== Mid-season changes ====
There was a clear trend of manufacturers switching from naturally aspirated engines to turbocharged engines, attracted by their power output:

- After a handful of races, Arrows was able to upgrade from their A6 chassis with Ford-Cosworth DFV V8 to the A7 with a BMW turbo engine.
- Osella switched their focus from the old Alfa Romeo V12 to Alfa's newer turbocharged 890T V8.
- Spirit Racing ran one car with a Hart turbo engine, while keeping the other powered by a Cosworth V8.

The teams were careful in their approach, running the old and new cars simultaneously, before finally stepping over to turbo.

=== Driver changes ===
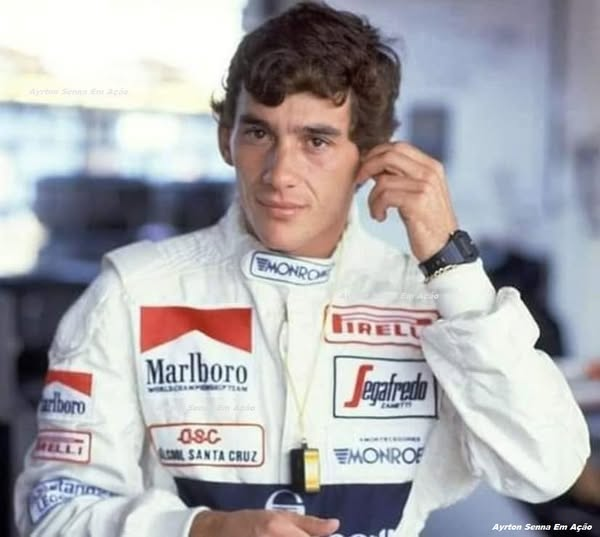
Ayrton Senna debuted this season, driving for Toleman Group Motorsport.

- Ferrari dropped Patrick Tambay in favour of Michele Alboreto, the first Italian driver signed by Enzo Ferrari since Ludovico Scarfiotti in 1963. Tambay moved to Renault, with former Toleman driver Derek Warwick as his new team mate. Warwick had taken the seat of Alain Prost after he was fired and moved to McLaren.
- The other ex-Renault driver, Eddie Cheever, moved to Alfa Romeo; Riccardo Patrese also moved to the team from Brabham. Teo Fabi, with backing from Italian dairy company Parmalat, was promoted to be the new team mate of reigning World Drivers' Champion Nelson Piquet.
- Ayrton Senna, the 1983 British F3 champion and a future F1 champion, made his debut with the Toleman team. Senna's F3 rival Martin Brundle made his debut with Tyrrell.
- Another seven driver changes happened during the off-season in the lower-ranking teams.

==== Mid-season changes ====
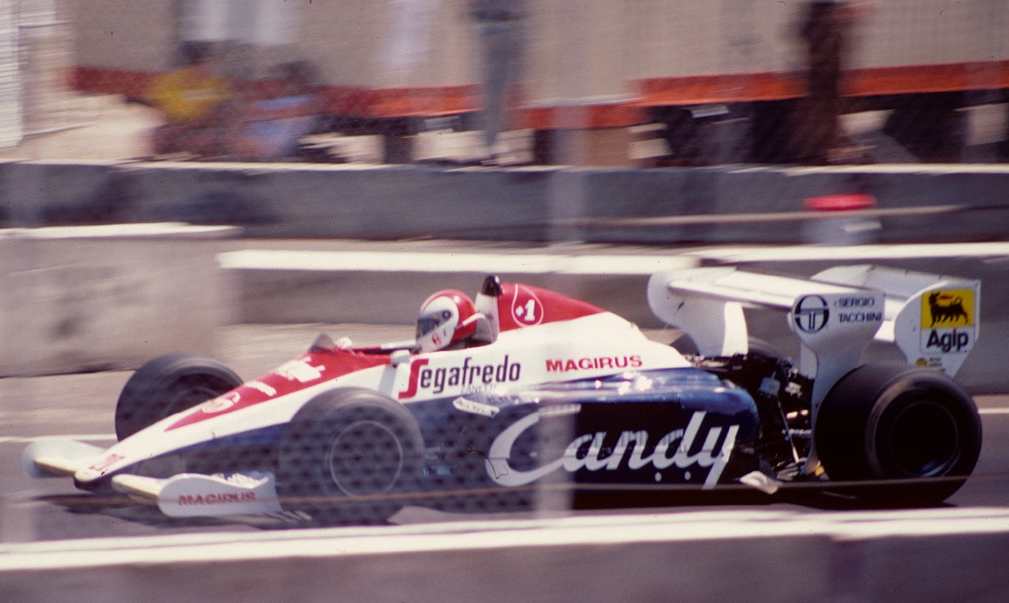
Johnny Cecotto (pictured during the Dallas Grand Prix) suffered a crash at Silverstone Circuit, ending his F1 career.

- During three weekends when Teo Fabi's commitments to American CART racing took precedence (he was fulfilling a 2 year contract with CART team Forsythe Racing signed in 1983), his younger brother Corrado fell in for him at Brabham. Manfred Winkelhock did this for the last race of the season, after he quit the ATS team.
- Dutch driver Huub Rothengatter made his debut with Spirit, driving eight races in the middle of the season, before handing the keys back to the team's first driver Mauro Baldi. For Rothengatter's home Grand Prix at Zandvoort, the Spirit 101-Hart was painted in Dutch racing orange.
- Mike Thackwell was on his way to clinching the 1984 European Formula Two Championship in dominant fashion and he got the attraction of several F1 teams. He entered a race with RAM and later one with Tyrrell. He also tested with Williams, but could not get a full-time seat.
- Tyrrell driver Martin Brundle crashed during practice for the Dallas Grand Prix and broke both ankles and feet. He was replaced for the next Grand Prix in Britain by Stefan Johansson.
- When it was announced two days after the Dutch Grand Prix that Ayrton Senna had signed a deal with Lotus for 1985, the Toleman team suspended him for not informing them first. Stefan Johansson took his place for the Italian Grand Prix.
- While qualifying for the British Grand Prix, Toleman driver Johnny Cecotto crashed heavily, breaking both of his legs which ended his F1 driving career. Debutant Pierluigi Martini, and later Stefan Johansson after his points scoring effort in Italy while replacing Ayrton Senna, took over the second car.
- Osella entered a second car for half of the races. Formula Two driver Jo Gartner was behind the wheel.
- ATS took German Formula 3 driver Gerhard Berger for 4 of the last 5 rounds of the Championship, using him for both Austria and Italy when Manfred Winkelhock was unable to start the car, and the last two races in Europe and Portugal as their sole driver after Winkelhock had left the team.
- Philippe Streiff made his debut at the last race of the season, driving a third Renault car with the number 33.

== Calendar ==
| Round | Grand Prix | Circuit | Date |
|---|---|---|---|
| 1 | Brazilian Grand Prix | (Brazil) Autodromo Jacarepaguá, Rio de Janeiro | 25 March |
| 2 | South African Grand Prix | (South Africa) Kyalami Grand Prix Circuit, Midrand | 7 April |
| 3 | Belgian Grand Prix | (Belgium) Circuit Zolder, Heusden-Zolder | 29 April |
| 4 | San Marino Grand Prix | (Italy) Autodromo Dino Ferrari, Imola | 6 May |
| 5 | French Grand Prix | (France) Dijon-Prenois, Dijon | 20 May |
| 6 | Monaco Grand Prix | Circuit de Monaco, Monte Carlo | 3 June |
| 7 | Canadian Grand Prix | (Canada) Circuit Gilles Villeneuve, Montreal | 17 June |
| 8 | Detroit Grand Prix | (United States) Detroit Street Circuit, Michigan | 24 June |
| 9 | Dallas Grand Prix | (United States) Fair Park Street Circuit, Dallas | 8 July |
| 10 | British Grand Prix | (United Kingdom) Brands Hatch, West Kingsdown | 22 July |
| 11 | German Grand Prix | (West Germany) Hockenheimring, Hockenheim | 5 August |
| 12 | Austrian Grand Prix | (Austria) Österreichring, Spielberg | 19 August |
| 13 | Dutch Grand Prix | (Netherlands) Circuit Park Zandvoort, Zandvoort | 26 August |
| 14 | Italian Grand Prix | (Italy) Autodromo Nazionale di Monza, Monza | 9 September |
| 15 | European Grand Prix | (West Germany) Nürburgring, Nürburg | 7 October |
| 16 | Portuguese Grand Prix | (Portugal) Autodromo do Estoril, Estoril | 21 October |

=== Calendar changes ===
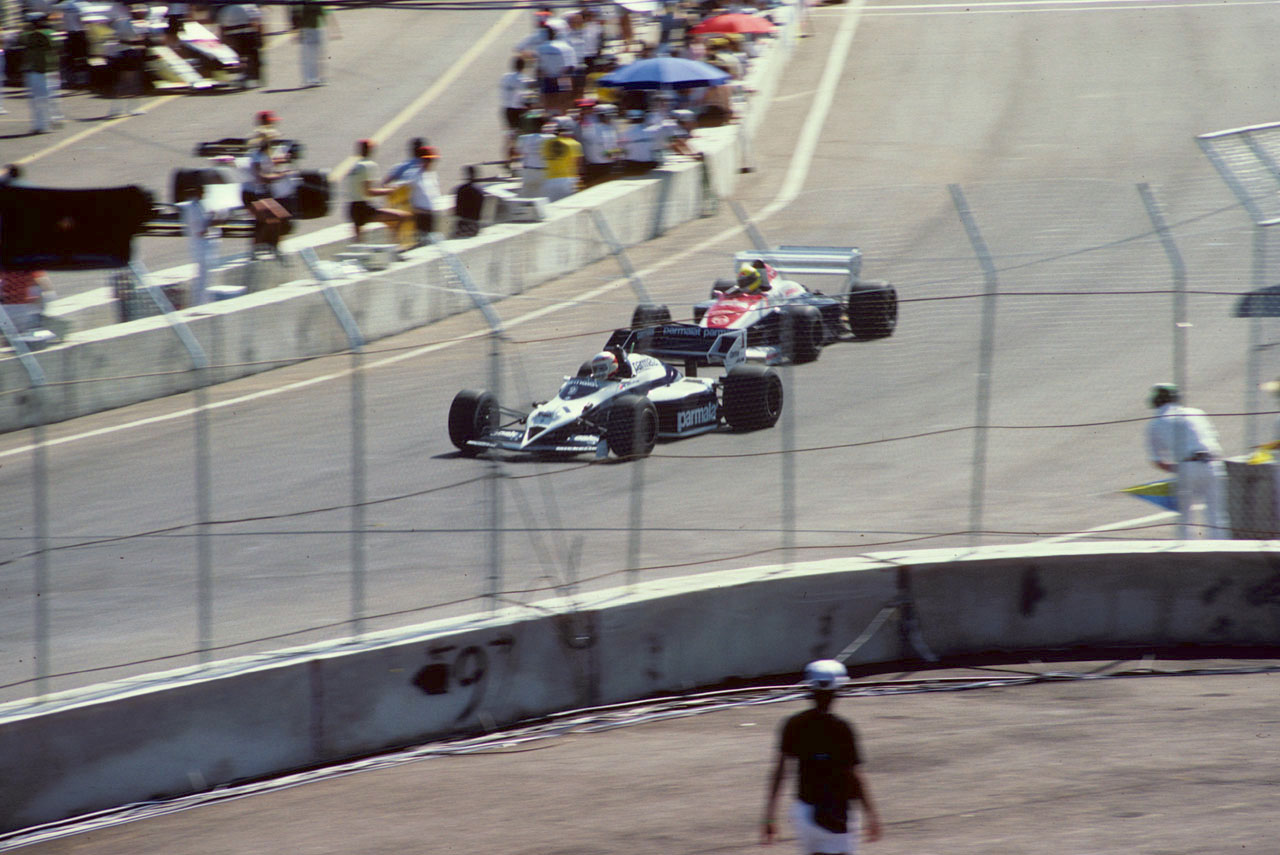
The 1984 event was the only Formula One Dallas Grand Prix. (Note: Subsequent Dallas Grands Prix were rounds of the Trans-Am Series. The next race took place at Fair Park in 1988 after the new race organiser agreed to donate proceeds to charities benefitting the local Black community, but continuing noise complaints prompted the relocation of subsequent races.)

- The race in Long Beach was replaced by the Dallas Grand Prix. It was the third in a series of "overseas" events, after the Canadian Grand Prix and the Detroit Grand Prix, but this put the F1 cars in the peak of the Texas summer heat. It would be the only F1 Dallas Grand Prix to be held.
- The South African Grand Prix was now the second race of the year instead of the season finale. That honor was given to the Portuguese Grand Prix at Estoril. The Grand Prix returned to the calendar for the first time since 1960.
- The Belgian Grand Prix was held at Circuit Zolder instead of Spa-Francorchamps, as part of an agreement to alternate between the venues, and moved up the schedule one month. In similar fashion, this year's British Grand Prix was held at Brands Hatch instead of Silverstone and the German Grand Prix was held at the Hockenheimring instead of the Nürburgring.
- The French and San Marino Grand Prix switched places, with the race at Imola now going first.

==== Provisional calendar ====
- On the provisional calendar, the Spanish Grand Prix was scheduled to return after a three-year absence. It was to be contested on a new street circuit in Fuengirola, but the plan did not come to fruition.
- Formula 1 tried to organise the New York City Grand Prix, but did not manage to do so for the second year in a row.
- The first Hungarian Grand Prix was scheduled for 7 October at the Népliget Park Circuit, but this was cancelled as plans for a race failed to materialise. The race was replaced by the European Grand Prix at the Nürburgring.

== Regulation changes ==
The FISA introduced fuel economy rules aimed at reducing speeds:

- Turbocharged cars would be limited to 220 L (58 US gal) of fuel per race. This was mandated merely by setting the maximum volume of the fuel tank to 220 litre and demanding it to be in the centre of the car, between driver and engine. This meant teams were still free to experiment, for example with freezing the fuel inside the tank to increase its density.
- Refuelling was banned.

A superlicence was now required for all F1 drivers.

Concrete walls could replace guardrails.

== Season report ==
=== Round 1: Brazil ===
Most of the Formula One seasons in the 1980s started at the sweltering tropical heat and humidity of the Jacarepagua Riocentro Autodrome in Rio de Janeiro, Brazil. A 10-day test followed by the Grand Prix often was the case. In addition to a frantic start, drivers had to deal with people running across the track with the cars bearing down on those people; Briton Derek Warwick in the French factory Renault led until an incident with Niki Lauda led to suspension failure; Frenchman Alain Prost won his first Grand Prix with McLaren at the flat and rough but fast Rio circuit. This was also Ayrton Senna's first Formula One race, he was driving for the Toleman team. Senna would prove to be the first retirement of the season when the turbo on his 4 cyl Hart engine failed on lap 8.

=== Round 2: South Africa ===
The South African Grand Prix was held traditionally at the fast and flowing Kyalami circuit near the high-altitude city of Johannesburg. During the race morning warm up session, Piercarlo Ghinzani had a massive accident at the fastest corner on the track, the Jukskei sweeping uphill left hander. As a result of the full fuel load in his Osella, a huge fire started which completely consumed the car, though Ghinzani escaped with only minor burns to his hands. However, it was enough for him to be withdrawn from the race.

Brazilian Nelson Piquet qualified on pole position, with Prost 2nd. The latter, however, had to start from the pit lane due to problems with his car (Prost was able to race the spare car after ignition problem with Lauda's McLaren was solved, as the Ghinzani crash allowed McLaren extra time to fix it. If not for the crash Lauda would have had the spare and Prost would not have driven). Although the Brabhams with their highly powerful BMW turbo engines proved to be very quick on this circuit, they were very unreliable cars, mostly due to the single turbocharger of the 4 cylinder engine. In addition to Piquet retiring, his teammate Teo Fabi also retired, and Austrian Niki Lauda moved up through the field to win in his McLaren. Prost was able to carve his way from the back to 2nd place, keeping his lead in the championship. The new Brazilian driver Ayrton Senna finished 6th in the race in his Toleman under considerable back pain, scoring his first ever World Championship point.

=== Round 3: Belgium ===
The Belgian Grand Prix was previously held at the revised Spa-Francorchamps circuit; for this year, however, it returned to the forested Zolder circuit further north. This race saw a fighting drive from Keke Rosberg, who was driving an ill-handling Williams with a Honda engine that was unbalancing the car. Ferrari's new Italian recruit Michele Alboreto won this race from Warwick and Frenchman Rene Arnoux, driving the second Ferrari. Both McLarens failed to finish. This would be the last time the Formula One Belgian Grand Prix was held at Zolder; from the following year onwards it would return and stay at Spa.

=== Round 4: San Marino (Imola, Italy) ===
The San Marino Grand Prix at the Autodromo Dino Ferrari in Italy was held one week after the Belgian race. Defending champion Piquet, proving yet again his Brabham's superiority on light fuel loads took pole position again. Amazingly, Senna did not qualify for the race after many problems with his uncompetitive Toleman, the only time in his F1 career in which he would fail to qualify. Piquet however retired in the race with another turbo failure, and Fabi retired on the same lap with the same problem. The race was won by Prost from his countryman Arnoux and Italian Elio de Angelis in a Renault-powered Lotus.

=== Round 5: France ===
The French Grand Prix, usually run in late June/early July was run in May at the very fast Dijon-Prenois circuit. Patrick Tambay took pole in his Renault; he finished 2nd to Niki Lauda in a McLaren that was superior to all other cars at this short circuit that was made up of long, fast corners. This would be the last time the French Grand Prix was held at the Dijon circuit; the cars were lapping in the 1 minute 2 second range during qualifying. The FIA stipulated that any lap during a Formula One event that was under a minute did not count as a completed lap.

=== Round 6: Monaco ===
The Monaco Grand Prix was the only Grand Prix in 1984 to be run in wet conditions. Qualifying saw Briton Martin Brundle crashing his Tyrrell at the Tabac corner, as his car overturned and landed on its left side. Brundle was uninjured, and took the spare car to qualify. In the race day, the circuit was flooded by rain, as never before in Monaco since the 1930s and the 1972 event. The organisers decided to cover the tunnel section with water, because of the dramatic difference between the very wet circuit and the almost completely dry "tunnel", which was in fact the road that went under the Hotel de Paris. Prost took pole position, in front of Mansell. As the drivers went away, there was an accident at the Saint-Devote corner during the start between both the Renaults of Tambay and Warwick; Tambay injured his legs (due to the design of the cars back then where the driver's feet were not required to be behind the front axle, as is the rule today) and had to be carried off the circuit on a stretcher. As the rain came down, Mansell spun his Lotus on the climb up to the Massenet corner after touching a slippery white line. Prost took the lead, although he was pacing himself in comparison to rookie drivers Ayrton Senna in a Toleman and Stefan Bellof in a naturally-aspirated Tyrrell. Senna and Bellof pushed hard in an attempt to catch Prost, who was still pacing himself in conditions that were getting worse. By lap 26 of the scheduled 80 laps, the conditions became so bad that Prost signalled to Jacky Ickx, the clerk of the course to stop the race. By lap 26, Senna was up to second place, 11 seconds behind Prost, and Bellof 4th, but on lap 29, the race was stopped. Prost parked his car on the main straight, and Senna passed him. However, the rules said that when a race was stopped, the order would be determined by what the order was on the previous lap- and Prost was leading on that lap. The race was never restarted, so Prost won with Senna second. Drivers scored half-points, as the race had not completed 75% of the scheduled distance.

=== Round 7: Canada ===
The Canadian race at the public road Gilles Villeneuve circuit on a man-made island in the St. Lawrence River's passageway through the center of Montreal was won by Nelson Piquet, who was finally able to actually finish a race this season after chronic unreliability with his Brabham. Piquet won ahead of Lauda and Prost; the latter had to deal with a misfire in his TAG-Porsche turbocharged engine.

=== Round 8: Detroit (USA) ===
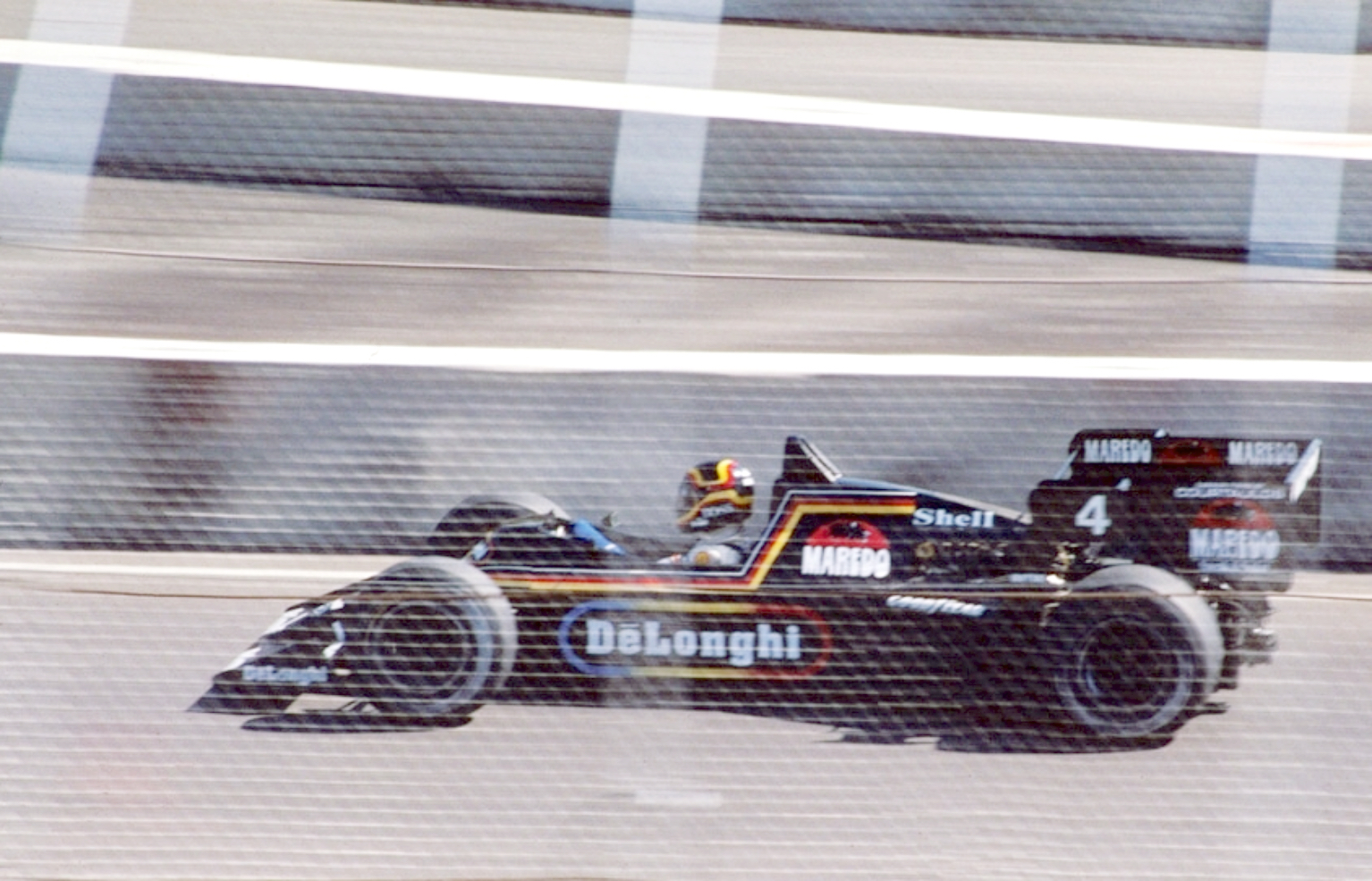
Stefan Bellof driving for Tyrrell in the 1984 Dallas Grand Prix. The team and its drivers were disqualified from the championship due to a technical infringement which was discovered at the Detroit Grand Prix.

The first of two rounds in the United States was held on an angular street circuit in the Ford and General Motors home city of Detroit, Michigan. The race was moved 2 weeks forward to late June, suffering a considerable temperature difference. It was very hot come race-day, and the track — which was already unpopular with drivers and as it was to do in subsequent Grand Prix in Detroit — was largely broken up. Nelson Piquet took pole position again; every driver who obtained pole position that year was given a free Vespa motor scooter. Piquet set the record that year for most motor scooters collected among F1 drivers. The start of the Detroit Grand Prix saw an accident between Piquet and Mansell which blocked much of the start-finish straight; this race had to be abandoned and restarted. Typical of Detroit, the race proved to be a race of severe attrition: only 6 of the 26 cars finished.

Nelson Piquet won again on a circuit where engine power was not as important as other things, and Martin Brundle compounded this with his naturally aspirated engined Tyrrell: Detroit was one of the few circuits where his underpowered car could actually finish in the points and be competitive. Thanks to the immediate power response of the naturally aspirated Ford-Cosworth V8 DFY in the Tyrrell, compared to the delayed power response of the turbocharged engines (all of which had more than 200 more horsepower than the DFY in 1984), Brundle passed de Angelis in a Lotus for second, and was closing on Piquet on the last lap. The British driver finished 8 tenths of a second behind the Brazilian.

Soon after the podium ceremony, word arrived that the officials had found impurities in the water injection system on Brundle's Tyrrell 012 and lead balls in the rubber bag containing the water. Samples of the water were shipped to France and Texas for analysis and found to contain significant levels of hydrocarbons. Team boss Ken Tyrrell was called to a meeting of the FISA Executive Committee on July 18 and, based on the impurities in the water, which had been topped up during a pit stop, was accused of refueling the car during the race. Refueling had been banned prior to the 1984 season and remained illegal until 1994. FISA found the team guilty and Tyrrell was disqualified from the remainder of the World Championship and lost the 13 points they had already gained as of Detroit. They were allowed to and did continue to race, but they were unable to score any championship points. Many in the paddock felt for Tyrrell as they believed the penalty far outweighed the crime and that FISA boss Jean-Marie Balestre had used the system to make an example of the British-based team to vindicate what happened the previous season, when Brabham escaped punishment after admitting to run a lighter car by using a different blend of fuel.

=== Round 9: Dallas (USA) ===
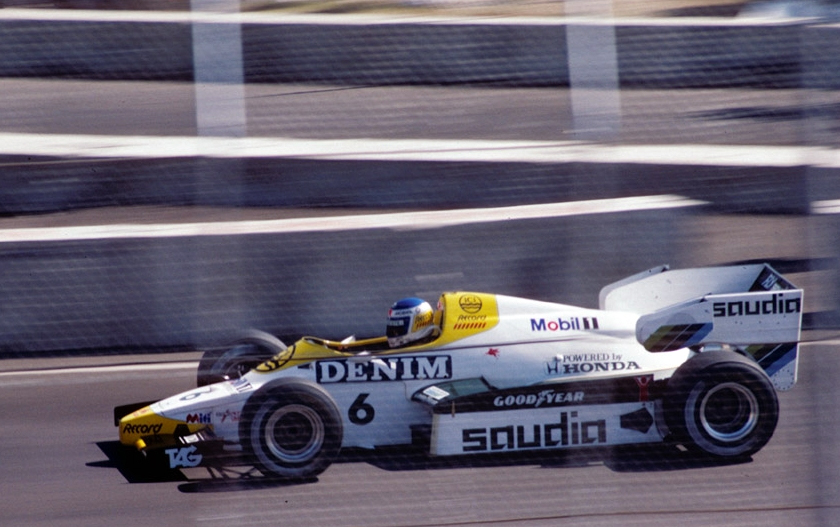
Keke Rosberg won the 1984 Dallas Grand Prix for Williams-Honda.

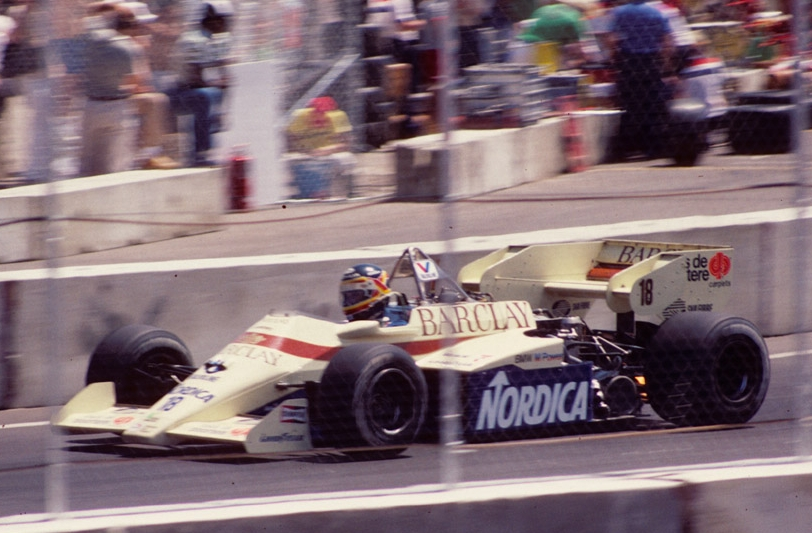
Thierry Boutsen driving for Arrows at the 1984 Dallas Grand Prix.

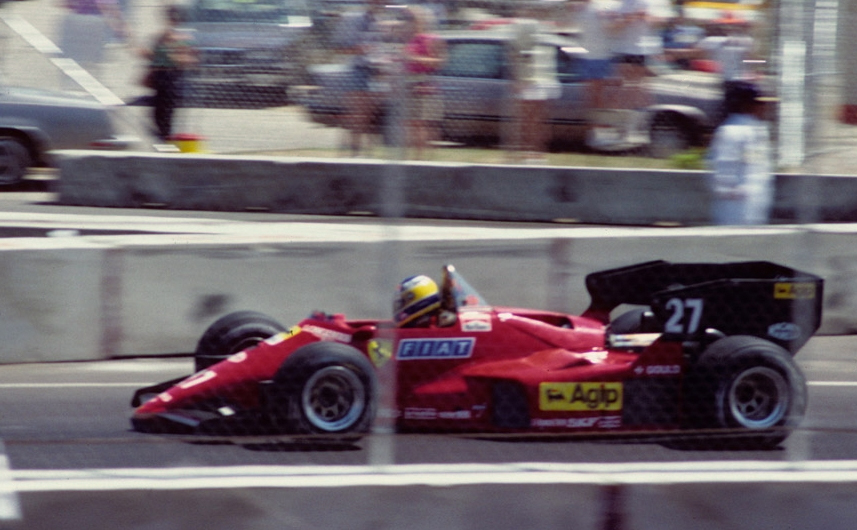
Michele Alboreto finished fourth in the Drivers' Championship in his first season at Ferrari.

The Formula One circus moved some 1,500 km (932.1 mi) south to a whole new location in the United States (to which it would never return), for the Dallas Grand Prix at the Fair Park circuit in Dallas, Texas. This race effectively replaced the United States Grand Prix West in Long Beach, California, which was held in April and was taken over by CART IndyCar racing. This race had already been controversial for being held in the intense 38 °C (100 °F) average heat and humidity of a Texas July summer, and there were week-long rumors of its cancellation. Although the event organization itself (headed by racing legend Carroll Shelby) was praised and Dallas's reception was thought to be welcoming and friendly, the time of year this race was scheduled made conditions extremely difficult. The concrete-wall lined circuit, located in a city district containing the Cotton Bowl some 10 kilometers outside of the center of Dallas measured what is possibly the highest track temperature ever recorded during a Grand Prix: 66 °C (151 °F). As a result, such extreme temperatures combined with the tyre and aerodynamic adhesion meant that the track almost completely disintegrated- the break up was so bad that the only parts of the track that were not covered with gravel were tire tracks left on the racing line. As a result, it was not only very slippery, but extremely bumpy as well. It was then decided to start the Grand Prix at 11:00 a.m. instead of the traditional time of 2:00 p.m. in an attempt to avoid the heat, which was scheduled to be 40 °C (104 °F) that day.

Nigel Mansell put his Lotus on pole position, the first of his career, with his teammate de Angelis alongside him in second. Martin Brundle yet again crashed severely and injured his ankles; he did not take part in the race. On race day, there was an American Trans-Am support race that left the track with huge holes in the track scattered everywhere. Shelby and the organizers were able to briefly fix these holes barely 45 minutes after the race was due to start, with Prost and Lauda leading protests to cancel the race.

As expected, the track broke up at the point that the cars had to line up behind each other even when right near each other to avoid the strewn gravel- which if the cars got on top of, they would slip and slide (with nearly the same effect as driving on ice) and most likely crash at the tight and extremely demanding Fair Park circuit. Mansell held off several challenges from Warwick, who got onto the marbles (strewn gravel) and crashed into a tire barrier- and also challenges from de Angelis, Prost, Lauda and Rosberg. Piquet was also catching this group and Arnoux, who had to start from the pit lane, passed several cars and was also closing on the leading group. Rosberg, who was running 2nd then forced Mansell into a mistake, and took the lead. Mansell had to go into the pits because of problems with his car; Prost took the lead from Rosberg, but eight laps later he clipped the wall and damaged his back right wheel. Rosberg, in his ill-handling Williams-Honda took advantage of Prost's mistake and re-passed the Frenchman. Piquet hit the wall, and then retired due to a jammed accelerator pedal. There were consistent retirements throughout the entire race (all but 2 of the retirements were either accident or punctured-tire related; made worse by the close concrete walls), with the air and track temperatures rising and the track getting even worse. Prost then retired due to a puncture, as did Michele Alboreto and Lauda. Rosberg, equipped with a skull cap that kept him cool went on to win ahead of Arnoux and de Angelis.

Only 7 of the 26 cars entered finished the race, one more finisher than Detroit. Mansell, one lap down in 6th place, suffered gearbox failure right before the finish, deciding to push his broken black Lotus across the line in the Dallas heat in his black overalls. While doing this, he collapsed and fainted due to exhaustion. He was given 6th place because the 7th and 8th-place finishers were 2 laps behind Mansell.

Although race organiser Dallas Grand Prix of Texas Inc. had agreed to hold five annual races at Fair Park, the company wound up insolvent after the 1984 race amidst an investigation into alleged embezzlement, and the future races were cancelled when the company failed to pay the 1985 front money. Another major factor leading to the cancellation was opposition from the nearby, populous Fair Park neighborhood, which was majority Black and low-income; citing noise and traffic concerns, community leaders filed lawsuits against the city and the organiser, creating the possibility that local authorities might not allow future races to take place. Formula One would return to Texas in November 2012 at the newly-constructed and permanent Circuit of the Americas, near the state capital of Austin, south of Dallas.

=== Race 10: Great Britain ===
Formula One returned to Europe after the attrition-filled North American tour. The Brands Hatch circuit, just outside London in southeastern England, played host to this year's British Grand Prix, alternating with Silverstone every two years.

During this time, the Tyrrell team had undergone a difficult period due to the fuel irregularities involving the re-filling of water tanks and the insertion of lead shot balls in the fuel tanks, in order to meet the minimum weight rules. In an unprecedented move that has not been repeated since, the FIA decided to ban the Tyrrell team from every future Grand Prix that season and strip the small English team of all its championship points on the grounds of cheating; team owner/operator Ken Tyrrell lost most of his sponsors between the Dallas and British Grands Prix.

Toleman driver and multiple motorcycle Grand Prix champion Johnny Cecotto crashed heavily at the fast Westfield corner hitting the barriers there head-on; the Venezuelan broke both his legs and never raced in Formula One again. Piquet again qualified on pole position, with Prost and Lauda 2nd and 3rd. This race was run as two parts: the first race saw a massive accident at the Bottom Bend left hand sweeping corner (otherwise known as Graham Hill corner); Riccardo Patrese (Alfa Romeo) tried to pass Jacques Laffite's Williams-Honda, but spun attempting to do so. This caused his teammate Eddie Cheever to lift off, and behind him Johansson did the same but Philippe Alliot in the RAM-Hart did not have time to react and went into the back of the Tyrrell and then flew over it, landing on the rear of Cheever's car. Also involved was Gartner who tried to avoid the crash and ended up in the tire barrier. The race went on, with Prost passing Piquet at the fearsome Paddock Hill bend; but this ended up not mattering because before the end of the lap, Jonathan Palmer had crashed the second RAM heavily at Clearways when the suspension failed. The car was parked beside the track and it was then decided that if it was left there, it could become a launch pad if another car went off the circuit. The race was stopped, and this meant that at the restart Piquet was on pole again as the order was based on the end of the 11th lap- much to the annoyance of Prost.

After the race restarted, Prost retired with gearbox failure, Piquet pitted and lost a lap on the leaders. So victory went to Niki Lauda. Warwick finished 2nd and Ayrton Senna finished 3rd in the Toleman, which was better suited to faster tracks with long corners like Brands Hatch than it was to slow and tight circuits.

=== Race 11: Germany ===
The very fast Hockenheim circuit in West Germany- the longest circuit of the year once again played host to the historic German Grand Prix. Surprisingly at this power circuit, Prost qualified his McLaren on pole position showing the benefits of a good car set up, and took the race victory ahead of Lauda and Warwick. Piquet retired yet again- this time with gearbox problems. The first part of the race saw a stirring drive from Senna- he was as high as 6th in his uncompetitive Toleman- but then his car's rear wing failed and he spun off near the Ostkurve chicane.

=== Race 12: Austria ===
The Austrian Grand Prix, held at the Österreichring at Zeltweg near Graz since 1970, played host to the 15th Austrian Grand Prix and the 400th Formula One Grand Prix. The Österreichring was the fastest circuit of the year (this was the case when Silverstone was not on the calendar). Pole-sitter Piquet took the lead and led for most of the race distance. After the Renault engine in Elio de Angelis's Lotus failed and littered the racing line at the very fast Jochen Rindt Kurve with slippery oil, the leaders Piquet and Prost came through- Piquet slipped and slid slightly through the corner- but Prost, while trying to hold 4th gear in place spun his car and crashed into the track-side Armco barrier. Lauda, who had passed 3rd placed Patrick Tambay coming out of the Bosch Kurve moved up into 2nd, and then began chasing Piquet; Lauda passed him going into the fastest corner on the track, the Tiroch Kurve. Piquet dropped back with ruined tires, and Lauda slowed down a lot after losing 4th gear in the Texaco Panorama curves. Lauda was able to stay in front of Piquet and become the only Austrian to win his home Grand Prix. Italian Michele Alboreto in a Ferrari finished 3rd.

=== Race 13: Netherlands ===
The beach-side Zandvoort circuit half an hour west of Amsterdam was the traditionally long-time host of the Dutch Grand Prix. This race was a McLaren 1–2 with Prost winning in front of Lauda with the Lotus duo Mansell and de Angelis finishing 3rd and 4th, respectively. It was at this race where McLaren secured the Manufacturers' Championship. The result also saw that only de Angelis had a mathematical chance of beating either Lauda or Prost to the Drivers' Championship.

=== Race 14: Italy ===
The Italian Grand Prix took place in early September at the Monza Autodrome near Milan. This race saw Prost retire after an updated spec. TAG-Porsche engine in his car failed early. Lauda, who was suffering the effects of a sore back, won from Italians Michele Alboreto and Riccardo Patrese who inherited the third place when his teammate Eddie Cheever ran out of fuel in his Alfa Romeo. This would prove to be the last F1 podium achieved by Alfa Romeo. Nelson Piquet led early before retiring with engine failure, while teammate Teo Fabi then led until he retired, also with a failed BMW engine. Patrick Tambay then took over the lead until he was passed by Lauda with the Renault retiring shortly after. Swedish driver Stefan Johansson stepped in to drive the Toleman of Ayrton Senna for this race after Toleman has suspended the Brazilian when it became known that he had signed to drive for Lotus from 1985. Johansson drove a steady race and capitalising on the retirements of others finished fourth, scoring his first World Championship points. Austrian drivers Jo Gartner and Gerhard Berger finished 5th and 6th for Osella and ATS respectively; however, as their teams had only entered one car for the season (Piercarlo Ghinzani and Manfred Winkelhock, respectively) and both were in second cars entered for the race neither received World Championship points.

=== Race 15: Europe (Germany) ===
Grands Prix in the Queens neighborhood of New York City and in the beachside resort town of Fuengirola, Spain had been cancelled; which left a month-long gap between the Italian and a replacement Grand Prix: the European Grand Prix, this year held at the all-new Nürburgring Grand Prix circuit, with state of the art safety facilities and paddock terraces. This new circuit replaced the old 22.8 km Nordschleife, which still exists today but in slightly shortened and bypassed form from the GP circuit.

As the race went on, there was an accident at the start involving Senna and Rosberg; both were out at the first corner; and Prost won this race unchallenged from Alboreto, pole-sitter Piquet and Lauda, who qualified 15th. This meant that Prost's victory meant that he still stood a chance to win his first Drivers' Championship; Lauda led the points tally with 3.5 points.

=== Race 16: Portugal ===
The first Portuguese Grand Prix since 1960 was held at the updated Estoril circuit near the Portuguese capital of Lisbon. McLaren had claimed the Constructors' Championship in Italy, after winning 11 of the 15 races in the season, including the last 6 Grands Prix. Prost qualified 2nd alongside Piquet, who collected his 9th pole of the season, while Lauda was 11th on the grid. Lauda climbed up to 3rd after passing Ayrton Senna, who had qualified 3rd in a Toleman. Piquet had fallen away, so Prost was leading, with Nigel Mansell second in his last race for Lotus before moving to Williams. Mansell retired due to persistent brake problems, and Lauda moved up to second, ensuring his third World Championship. Prost won McLaren's 7th consecutive victory and 12th of 16 races, whilst Lauda finished second, a mere half point in front of Prost in the championship, a record margin that has not been matched since. Senna completed the podium. As of 1984, Prost (future winner of four World Championships) had lost his 3rd consecutive F1 championship: he had been beaten by 2 points in 1983, and 7 points in 1982.

== Results and standings ==
=== Grands Prix ===
| Round | Grand Prix | Pole position | Fastest lap | Winning driver | Winning constructor | Report |
|---|---|---|---|---|---|---|
| 1 | (Brazil) Brazilian Grand Prix | (Italy) Elio de Angelis | (France) Alain Prost | (France) Alain Prost | (United Kingdom) McLaren-TAG | Report |
| 2 | (South Africa) South African Grand Prix | (Brazil) Nelson Piquet | (France) Patrick Tambay | (Austria) Niki Lauda | (United Kingdom) McLaren-TAG | Report |
| 3 | (Belgium) Belgian Grand Prix | (Italy) Michele Alboreto | (France) René Arnoux | (Italy) Michele Alboreto | (Italy) Ferrari | Report |
| 4 | (Italy) San Marino Grand Prix | (Brazil) Nelson Piquet | (Brazil) Nelson Piquet | (France) Alain Prost | (United Kingdom) McLaren-TAG | Report |
| 5 | (France) French Grand Prix | (France) Patrick Tambay | (France) Alain Prost | (Austria) Niki Lauda | (United Kingdom) McLaren-TAG | Report |
| 6 | Monaco Grand Prix^{1} | (France) Alain Prost | (Brazil) Ayrton Senna | (France) Alain Prost | (United Kingdom) McLaren-TAG | Report |
| 7 | (Canada) Canadian Grand Prix | (Brazil) Nelson Piquet | (Brazil) Nelson Piquet | (Brazil) Nelson Piquet | (United Kingdom) Brabham-BMW | Report |
| 8 | (United States) Detroit Grand Prix | (Brazil) Nelson Piquet | (United Kingdom) Derek Warwick | (Brazil) Nelson Piquet | (United Kingdom) Brabham-BMW | Report |
| 9 | (United States) Dallas Grand Prix | (United Kingdom) Nigel Mansell | (Austria) Niki Lauda | (Finland) Keke Rosberg | (United Kingdom) Williams-Honda | Report |
| 10 | (United Kingdom) British Grand Prix | (Brazil) Nelson Piquet | (Austria) Niki Lauda | (Austria) Niki Lauda | (United Kingdom) McLaren-TAG | Report |
| 11 | (West Germany) German Grand Prix | (France) Alain Prost | (France) Alain Prost | (France) Alain Prost | (United Kingdom) McLaren-TAG | Report |
| 12 | (Austria) Austrian Grand Prix | (Brazil) Nelson Piquet | (Austria) Niki Lauda | (Austria) Niki Lauda | (United Kingdom) McLaren-TAG | Report |
| 13 | (Netherlands) Dutch Grand Prix | (France) Alain Prost | (France) René Arnoux | (France) Alain Prost | (United Kingdom) McLaren-TAG | Report |
| 14 | (Italy) Italian Grand Prix | (Brazil) Nelson Piquet | (Austria) Niki Lauda | (Austria) Niki Lauda | (United Kingdom) McLaren-TAG | Report |
| 15 | (Germany) European Grand Prix | (Brazil) Nelson Piquet | (Brazil) Nelson Piquet (Italy) Michele Alboreto | (France) Alain Prost | (United Kingdom) McLaren-TAG | Report |
| 16 | (Portugal) Portuguese Grand Prix | (Brazil) Nelson Piquet | (Austria) Niki Lauda | (France) Alain Prost | (United Kingdom) McLaren-TAG | Report |

1. Half points awarded after race was stopped due to dangerous conditions.

=== Scoring system ===
Points were awarded to the top six classified finishers. For the Drivers' Championship, the best eleven results were counted, while, for the Constructors' Championship, all rounds were counted.

No driver classified in more than eleven points-scoring positions, so no drop-rounds applied for this season. Points were awarded in the following system:

| Position | 1st | 2nd | 3rd | 4th | 5th | 6th |
|---|---|---|---|---|---|---|
| Race | 9 | 6 | 4 | 3 | 2 | 1 |

=== World Drivers' Championship standings ===
| Pos | Driver | BRA (Brazil) | RSA (South Africa) | BEL (Belgium) | SMR (Italy) | FRA (France) | MON^{†} (Monaco) | CAN (Canada) | DET (United States) | DAL (United States) | GBR (United Kingdom) | GER (West Germany) | AUT (Austria) | NED (Netherlands) | ITA (Italy) | EUR (Germany) | POR (Portugal) | Points |
|---|---|---|---|---|---|---|---|---|---|---|---|---|---|---|---|---|---|---|
| 1 | (Austria) Niki Lauda | Ret | 1 | Ret | Ret | 1 | Ret | 2 | Ret | Ret^{F} | 1^{F} | 2 | 1^{F} | 2 | 1^{F} | 4 | 2^{F} | 72 |
| 2 | (France) Alain Prost | 1^{F} | 2 | Ret | 1 | 7^{F} | 1^{P} | 3 | 4 | Ret | Ret | 1^{P}^{F} | Ret | 1^{P} | Ret | 1 | 1 | 71.5 |
| 3 | (Italy) Elio de Angelis | 3^{P} | 7 | 5 | 3 | 5 | 5 | 4 | 2 | 3 | 4 | Ret | Ret | 4 | Ret | Ret | 5 | 34 |
| 4 | (Italy) Michele Alboreto | Ret | 11 | 1^{P} | Ret | Ret | 6 | Ret | Ret | Ret | 5 | Ret | 3 | Ret | 2 | 2^{F} | 4 | 30.5 |
| 5 | (Brazil) Nelson Piquet | Ret | Ret^{P} | 9 | Ret^{P}^{F} | Ret | Ret | 1^{P}^{F} | 1^{P} | Ret | 7^{P} | Ret | 2^{P} | Ret | Ret^{P} | 3^{P}^{F} | 6^{P} | 29 |
| 6 | (France) René Arnoux | Ret | Ret | 3^{F} | 2 | 4 | 3 | 5 | Ret | 2 | 6 | 6 | 7 | 11^{F} | Ret | 5 | 9 | 27 |
| 7 | (United Kingdom) Derek Warwick | Ret | 3 | 2 | 4 | Ret | Ret | Ret | Ret^{F} | Ret | 2 | 3 | Ret | Ret | Ret | 11 | Ret | 23 |
| 8 | (Finland) Keke Rosberg | 2 | Ret | 4 | Ret | 6 | 4 | Ret | Ret | 1 | Ret | Ret | Ret | 8 | Ret | Ret | Ret | 20.5 |
| 9 | (Brazil) Ayrton Senna | Ret | 6 | 6 | DNQ | Ret | 2^{F} | 7 | Ret | Ret | 3 | Ret | Ret | Ret | | Ret | 3 | 13 |
| = | (United Kingdom) Nigel Mansell | Ret | Ret | Ret | Ret | 3 | Ret | 6 | Ret | 6^{P} | Ret | 4 | Ret | 3 | Ret | Ret | Ret | 13 |
| 11 | (France) Patrick Tambay | 5 | Ret^{F} | 7 | Ret | 2^{P} | Ret | WD | Ret | Ret | 8 | 5 | Ret | 6 | Ret | Ret | 7 | 11 |
| 12 | (Italy) Teo Fabi | Ret | Ret | Ret | Ret | 9 | | | 3 | | Ret | Ret | 4 | 5 | Ret | Ret | | 9 |
| 13 | (Italy) Riccardo Patrese | Ret | 4 | Ret | Ret | Ret | Ret | Ret | Ret | Ret | 12 | Ret | 10 | Ret | 3 | 6 | 8 | 8 |
| 14 | (France) Jacques Laffite | Ret | Ret | Ret | Ret | 8 | 8 | Ret | 5 | 4 | Ret | Ret | Ret | Ret | Ret | Ret | 14 | 5 |
| 15 | (Belgium) Thierry Boutsen | 6 | 12 | Ret | 5 | 11 | DNQ | Ret | Ret | Ret | Ret | Ret | 5 | Ret | 10 | 9 | Ret | 5 |
| 16 | (Sweden) Stefan Johansson | | | | | | | | | | DSQ | DSQ | DNQ | DSQ | 4 | Ret | 11 | 3 |
| = | (United States) Eddie Cheever | 4 | Ret | Ret | 7 | Ret | DNQ | 11 | Ret | Ret | Ret | Ret | Ret | 13 | 9 | Ret | 17 | 3 |
| 18 | (Italy) Andrea de Cesaris | Ret | 5 | Ret | 6 | 10 | Ret | Ret | Ret | Ret | 10 | 7 | Ret | Ret | Ret | 7 | 12 | 3 |
| 19 | (Italy) Piercarlo Ghinzani | Ret | DNS | Ret | DNQ | 12 | 7 | Ret | Ret | 5 | 9 | Ret | Ret | Ret | 7 | Ret | Ret | 2 |
| 20 | (Switzerland) Marc Surer | 7 | 9 | 8 | Ret | Ret | DNQ | Ret | Ret | Ret | 11 | Ret | 6 | Ret | Ret | Ret | Ret | 1 |
| — | (Austria) Jo Gartner | | | | Ret | | | | | | Ret | Ret | Ret | 12 | 5* | Ret | 16 | 0 |
| — | (Austria) Gerhard Berger | | | | | | | | | | | | 12 | | 6* | Ret | 13 | 0 |
| — | (France) François Hesnault | Ret | 10 | Ret | Ret | DNS | Ret | Ret | Ret | Ret | Ret | 8 | 8 | 7 | Ret | 10 | Ret | 0 |
| — | (Italy) Corrado Fabi | | | | | | Ret | Ret | | 7 | | | | | | | | 0 |
| — | (Italy) Mauro Baldi | Ret | 8 | Ret | 8 | Ret | DNQ | | | | | | | | | 8 | 15 | 0 |
| — | (West Germany) Manfred Winkelhock | EX | Ret | Ret | Ret | Ret | Ret | 8 | Ret | 8 | Ret | Ret | DNS | Ret | DNS | | 10 | 0 |
| — | (United Kingdom) Jonathan Palmer | 8 | Ret | 10 | 9 | 13 | DNQ | | Ret | Ret | Ret | Ret | 9 | 9 | Ret | Ret | Ret | 0 |
| — | (Netherlands) Huub Rothengatter | | | | | | | NC | DNQ | Ret | NC | 9 | NC | Ret | 8 | | | 0 |
| — | (Venezuela) Johnny Cecotto | Ret | Ret | Ret | NC | Ret | Ret | 9 | Ret | Ret | DNQ | | | | | | | 0 |
| — | (France) Philippe Alliot | Ret | Ret | DNQ | Ret | Ret | DNQ | 10 | Ret | DNS | Ret | Ret | 11 | 10 | Ret | Ret | Ret | 0 |
| — | (West Germany) Stefan Bellof | DSQ | DSQ | DSQ | DSQ | DSQ | DSQ | DSQ | DSQ | DSQ | DSQ | | EX | DSQ | | | | 0 |
| — | (United Kingdom) Martin Brundle | DSQ | DSQ | DSQ | DSQ | DSQ | DNQ | DSQ | DSQ | DNQ | | | | | | | | 0 |
| — | (New Zealand) Mike Thackwell | | | | | | | Ret | | | | DNQ | | | | | | 0 |
| — | (France) Philippe Streiff | | | | | | | | | | | | | | | | Ret | 0 |
| — | (Italy) Pierluigi Martini | | | | | | | | | | | | | | DNQ | | | 0 |
| Pos | Driver | BRA (Brazil) | RSA (South Africa) | BEL (Belgium) | SMR (Italy) | FRA (France) | MON^{†} (Monaco) | CAN (Canada) | DET (United States) | DAL (United States) | GBR (United Kingdom) | GER (West Germany) | AUT (Austria) | NED (Netherlands) | ITA (Italy) | EUR (Germany) | POR (Portugal) | Points |

Key
| Colour | Result |
|---|---|
| Gold | Winner |
| Silver | Second place |
| Bronze | Third place |
| Green | Other points position |
| Blue | Other classified position |
| Blue | Not classified, finished (NC) |
| Purple | Not classified, retired (Ret) |
| Red | Did not qualify (DNQ) |
| Black | Disqualified (DSQ) |
| White | Did not start (DNS) |
| White | Race cancelled (C) |
| Blank | Did not practice (DNP) |
| Blank | Excluded (EX) |
| Blank | Did not arrive (DNA) |
| Blank | Withdrawn (WD) |
| Blank | Did not enter (empty cell) |
| Annotation | Meaning |
| P | Pole position |
| F | Fastest lap |

Notes

^{†} Half points were awarded at the Monaco Grand Prix as less than 75% of the scheduled distance was completed.
* Neither Gartner nor Berger were eligible for points, as they were driving the respective "second entries" of Osella and ATS and both teams had officially entered only one car for the entire championship.

=== World Constructors' Championship standings ===
| Pos | Constructor | Car no. | BRA (Brazil) | RSA (South Africa) | BEL (Belgium) | SMR (Italy) | FRA (France) | MON^{†} (Monaco) | CAN (Canada) | DET (United States) | DAL (United States) | GBR (United Kingdom) | GER (West Germany) | AUT (Austria) | NED (Netherlands) | ITA (Italy) | EUR (Germany) | POR (Portugal) | Pts |
|---|---|---|---|---|---|---|---|---|---|---|---|---|---|---|---|---|---|---|---|
| 1 | (United Kingdom) McLaren-TAG | 7 | 1 | 2 | Ret | 1 | 7 | 1 | 3 | 4 | Ret | Ret | 1 | Ret | 1 | Ret | 1 | 1 | 143.5 |
| 1 | (United Kingdom) McLaren-TAG | 8 | Ret | 1 | Ret | Ret | 1 | Ret | 2 | Ret | Ret | 1 | 2 | 1 | 2 | 1 | 4 | 2 | 143.5 |
| 2 | (Italy) Ferrari | 27 | Ret | 11 | 1 | Ret | Ret | 6 | Ret | Ret | Ret | 5 | Ret | 3 | Ret | 2 | 2 | 4 | 57.5 |
| 2 | (Italy) Ferrari | 28 | Ret | Ret | 3 | 2 | 4 | 3 | 5 | Ret | 2 | 6 | 6 | 7 | 11 | Ret | 5 | 9 | 57.5 |
| 3 | (United Kingdom) Lotus-Renault | 11 | 3 | 7 | 5 | 3 | 5 | 5 | 4 | 2 | 3 | 4 | Ret | Ret | 4 | Ret | Ret | 5 | 47 |
| 3 | (United Kingdom) Lotus-Renault | 12 | Ret | Ret | Ret | Ret | 3 | Ret | 6 | Ret | 6 | Ret | 4 | Ret | 3 | Ret | Ret | Ret | 47 |
| 4 | (United Kingdom) Brabham-BMW | 1 | Ret | Ret | 9 | Ret | Ret | Ret | 1 | 1 | Ret | 7 | Ret | 2 | Ret | Ret | 3 | 6 | 38 |
| 4 | (United Kingdom) Brabham-BMW | 2 | Ret | Ret | Ret | Ret | 9 | Ret | Ret | 3 | 7 | Ret | Ret | 4 | 5 | Ret | Ret | 10 | 38 |
| 5 | (France) Renault | 15 | 5 | Ret | 7 | Ret | 2 | Ret | WD | Ret | Ret | 8 | 5 | Ret | 6 | Ret | Ret | 7 | 34 |
| 5 | (France) Renault | 16 | Ret | 3 | 2 | 4 | Ret | Ret | Ret | Ret | Ret | 2 | 3 | Ret | Ret | Ret | 11 | Ret | 34 |
| 5 | (France) Renault | 33 | | | | | | | | | | | | | | | | Ret | 34 |
| 6 | (United Kingdom) Williams-Honda | 5 | Ret | Ret | Ret | Ret | 8 | 8 | Ret | 5 | 4 | Ret | Ret | Ret | Ret | Ret | Ret | 14 | 25.5 |
| 6 | (United Kingdom) Williams-Honda | 6 | 2 | Ret | 4 | Ret | 6 | 4 | Ret | Ret | 1 | Ret | Ret | Ret | 8 | Ret | Ret | Ret | 25.5 |
| 7 | (United Kingdom) Toleman-Hart | 19 | Ret | 6 | 6 | DNQ | Ret | 2 | 7 | Ret | Ret | 3 | Ret | Ret | Ret | 4 | Ret | 3 | 16 |
| 7 | (United Kingdom) Toleman-Hart | 20 | Ret | Ret | Ret | NC | Ret | Ret | 9 | Ret | Ret | DNQ | | | | DNQ | Ret | 11 | 16 |
| 8 | (Italy) Alfa Romeo | 22 | Ret | 4 | Ret | Ret | Ret | Ret | Ret | Ret | Ret | 12 | Ret | 10 | Ret | 3 | 6 | 8 | 11 |
| 8 | (Italy) Alfa Romeo | 23 | 4 | Ret | Ret | 7 | Ret | DNQ | 11 | Ret | Ret | Ret | Ret | Ret | 13 | 9 | Ret | 17 | 11 |
| 9 | (France) Ligier-Renault | 25 | Ret | 10 | Ret | Ret | DNS | Ret | Ret | Ret | Ret | Ret | 8 | 8 | 7 | Ret | 10 | Ret | 3 |
| 9 | (France) Ligier-Renault | 26 | Ret | 5 | Ret | 6 | 10 | Ret | Ret | Ret | Ret | 10 | 7 | Ret | Ret | Ret | 7 | 12 | 3 |
| 10 | (United Kingdom) Arrows-Ford | 17 | 7 | 9 | 8 | | Ret | DNQ | Ret | Ret | | | | | | | | | 3 |
| 10 | (United Kingdom) Arrows-Ford | 18 | 6 | 12 | | 5 | | | | | | | | | | | | | 3 |
| 11 | (United Kingdom) Arrows-BMW | 17 | | | | Ret | | | | | Ret | 11 | Ret | 6 | Ret | Ret | Ret | Ret | 3 |
| 11 | (United Kingdom) Arrows-BMW | 18 | | | Ret | | 11 | DNQ | Ret | Ret | Ret | Ret | Ret | 5 | Ret | 10 | 9 | Ret | 3 |
| 12 | (Italy) Osella-Alfa Romeo | 24 | Ret | DNS | Ret | DNQ | 12 | 7 | Ret | Ret | 5 | 9 | Ret | Ret | Ret | 7 | Ret | Ret | 2 |
| 12 | (Italy) Osella-Alfa Romeo | 30 | | | | Ret | | | | | | Ret | Ret | Ret | 12 | 5 | Ret | 16 | 2 |
| — | (West Germany) ATS-BMW | 14 | EX | Ret | Ret | Ret | Ret | Ret | 8 | Ret | 8 | Ret | Ret | DNS | Ret | DNS | | 13 | 0 |
| — | (West Germany) ATS-BMW | 31 | | | | | | | | | | | | 12 | | 6 | Ret | | 0 |
| — | (United Kingdom) Spirit-Hart | 21 | Ret | 8 | Ret | 8 | Ret | DNQ | NC | | Ret | NC | 9 | NC | Ret | 8 | 8 | 15 | 0 |
| — | (United Kingdom) RAM-Hart | 9 | Ret | Ret | DNQ | Ret | Ret | DNQ | 10 | Ret | DNS | Ret | Ret | 11 | 10 | Ret | Ret | Ret | 0 |
| — | (United Kingdom) RAM-Hart | 10 | 8 | Ret | 10 | 9 | 13 | DNQ | Ret | Ret | Ret | Ret | Ret | 9 | 9 | Ret | Ret | Ret | 0 |
| — | (United Kingdom) Spirit-Ford | 21 | | | | | | | | DNQ | | | | | | | | | 0 |
| DSQ | (United Kingdom) Tyrrell-Ford | 3 | DSQ | DSQ | DSQ | DSQ | DSQ | DNQ | DSQ | DSQ | DNQ | DSQ | DSQ | DNQ | DSQ | | | | 0 (Note: Tyrrell was excluded from the results of the Constructors' Championship due to a technical infringement. It was the first constructor to be disqualified from a Formula One Constructors' Championship, and the only one where their drivers also lost their results. (In the only other instance where a team was disqualified, McLaren in 2007, their drivers kept their points.)) |
| DSQ | (United Kingdom) Tyrrell-Ford | 4 | DSQ | DSQ | DSQ | DSQ | DSQ | DSQ | DSQ | DSQ | DSQ | DSQ | DNQ | EX | DSQ | | | | 0 |
| Pos | Constructor | Car no. | BRA (Brazil) | RSA (South Africa) | BEL (Belgium) | SMR (Italy) | FRA (France) | MON^{†} (Monaco) | CAN (Canada) | DET (United States) | DAL (United States) | GBR (United Kingdom) | GER (West Germany) | AUT (Austria) | NED (Netherlands) | ITA (Italy) | EUR (Germany) | POR (Portugal) | Pts |

- On 18 July, prior to the British Grand Prix, Tyrrell were disqualified from the championship due to a technical infringement, which had been discovered at the Detroit Grand Prix. They continued racing under appeal but were ineligible to score points towards the championship. On 29 August, the FIA rejected the team's appeal and banned them from the final three races of the season. The 13 points they had scored prior to the disqualification were subsequently reallocated.
- ^{†} Half points were awarded at the Monaco Grand Prix as less than 75% of the scheduled distance was completed.
