= Marc Surer =

Swiss racing driver (born 1951)

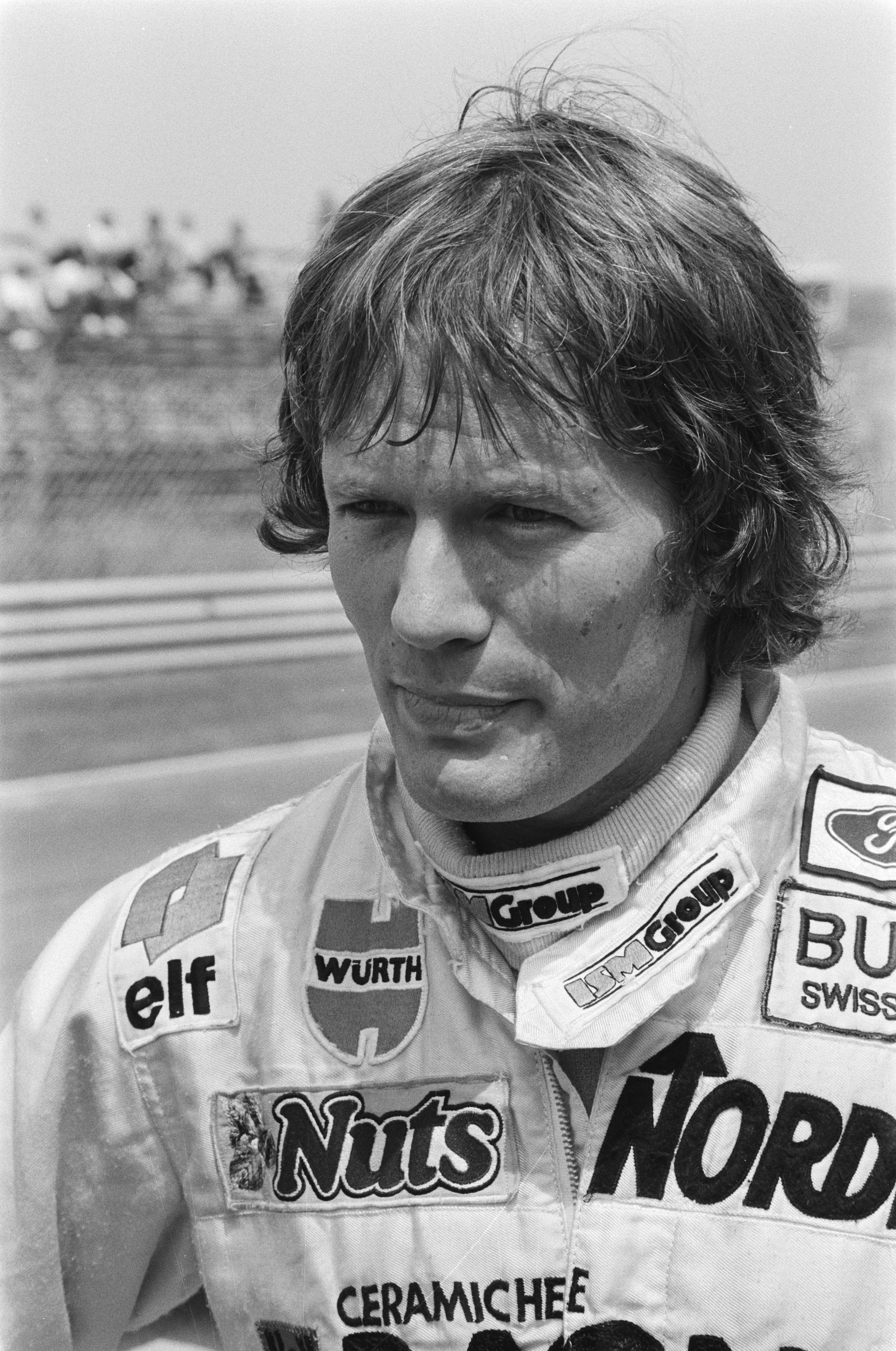
- Surer at the 1982 Dutch Grand Prix
- Born: 18 September 1951 (age 75); Arisdorf, Switzerland
- Spouses: Jolanda Egger (m. 1986; div. 1993) Christina Surer (m. 1997; div. 2000) Silvia Renée Arias (m. 2011)

Formula One World Championship career
- Nationality: (Switzerland) Swiss
- Active years: 1979–1986
- Team(s): Ensign, ATS, Theodore, Arrows, Brabham
- Entries: 88 (82 starts)
- Championships: 0
- Wins: 0
- Podiums: 0
- Career points: 17
- Pole positions: 0
- Fastest laps: 1
- First entry: 1979 Italian Grand Prix
- Last entry: 1986 Belgian Grand Prix

Marc Surer (born 18 September 1951) is a Swiss former racing driver and broadcaster, who competed in Formula One from 1979 to 1986.

Born in Arisdorf, Surer began kart racing at the age of 20. He moved to Germany in 1974 to compete in Formula Vee, as motor racing was banned in Switzerland following the 1955 Le Mans disaster. After finishing runner-up in the 1976 German Formula Three Championship, Surer progressed to European Formula Two, winning the title in 1979 with the BMW Junior Team. Making his Formula One debut at the Italian Grand Prix that year with Ensign, Surer signed for ATS in 1980. He participated in 88 Formula One Grands Prix, scoring 17 championship points.

== Racing career ==
Surer started his career in karting in 1972. Due to the racing ban established in Switzerland after the 1955 Le Mans disaster, he moved to Germany in 1974, where he finished second in the local Formula Vee Championship. In 1976, he switched to European Formula 3, where he was noticed by Jochen Neerpasch, who hired him as a member of the BMW Junior Team alongside Eddie Cheever and Manfred Winkelhock. In 1978, he finished second in the Formula 2 Championship, eventually winning the series the following year in a works March-BMW.

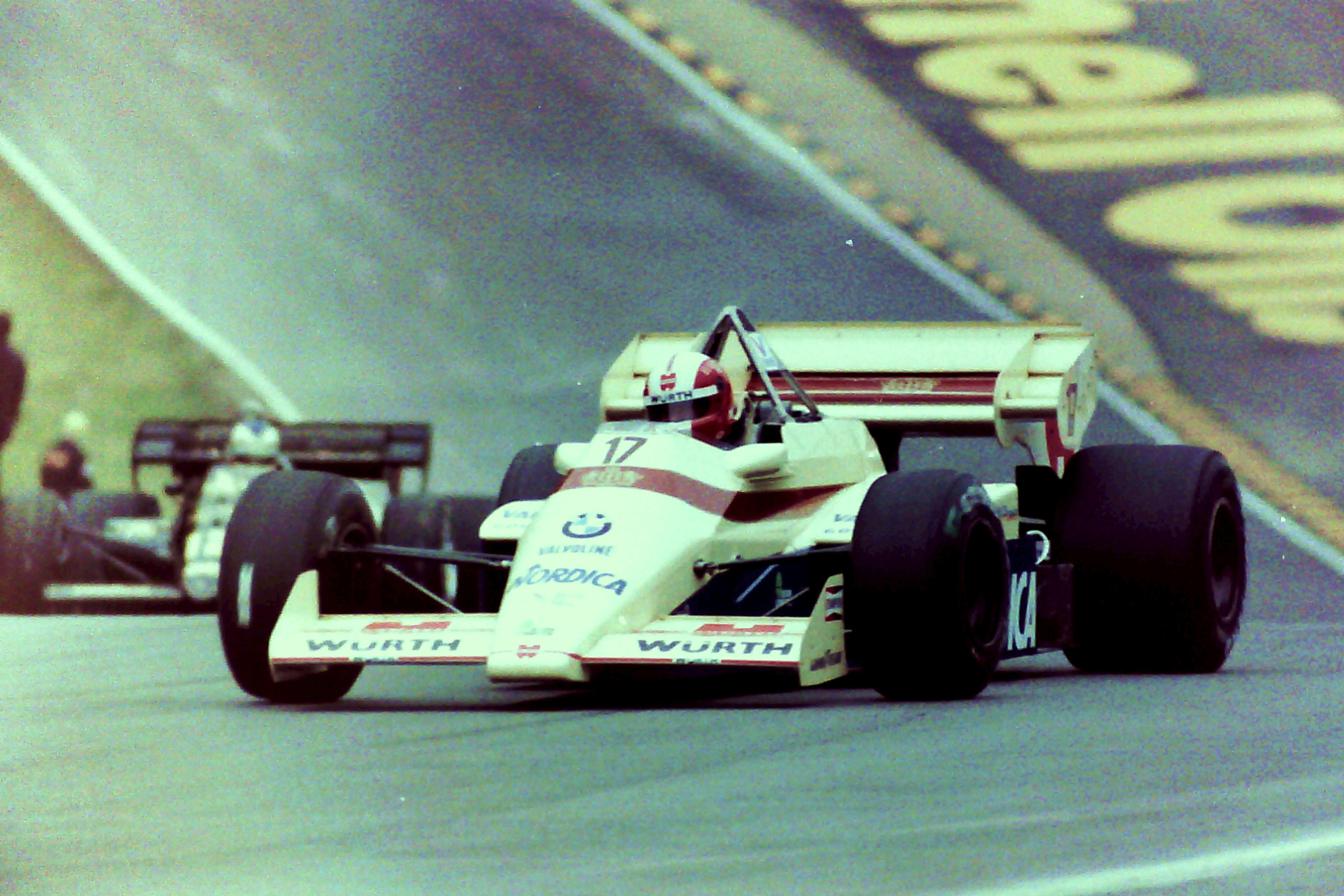
Surer driving for Arrows at the 1984 British Grand Prix.

Surer's debut in Formula 1 took place at the end of 1979 and was somewhat troubled. He broke his legs in qualifying at the South African Grand Prix in an ATS at Kyalami in 1980 and again racing there in 1981 for Ensign. He recovered to give Ensign their best result with a fourth-place finish at the 1981 Brazilian Grand Prix, also setting the fastest lap of the race. He later drove for Theodore before establishing himself at Arrows for a couple of seasons, until BMW's support earned him a seat at Brabham for 1985. Surer returned to Arrows in 1986 but eventually retired from Formula One halfway through the season due to a serious accident at the 1986 ADAC Hessen-Rallye in his Ford RS200 that severely injured him and killed his co-driver and friend Michel Wyder. BMW retained him as a driver, coach and later director of motorsport activities. In 1994 and 1995, Surer, alongside Johnny Cecotto and Joachim Winkelhock, won the German Super Touring Car Championship.

In 1996, Surer began working as a television commentator at all Formula 1 events for Sky Sport (Germany) (formerly known as DF1 and Premiere) next to the lead commentator Jacques Schulz. After Schulz's withdrawal prior to the 2013 season, he remained as a commentator alongside Sascha Roos until 2017.

== Formula One all-time ranking ==
In 2016, in an academic paper that reported a mathematical modeling study that assessed the relative influence of driver and machine, Surer was ranked the 17th best Formula One driver of all time.

== Personal life ==
Surer has been married twice to former Playboy models, first to Playmate Jolanda Egger, and then to Christina Surer between 1997 and 2000. On 3 December 2011 he married his longtime partner Silvia Renée Arias.

== Racing record ==
=== Career summary ===
Season	Series	Team	Races	Wins	Poles	F/Laps	Podiums	Points	Position
1975	Formula Vee		?	0	?	?	?	24	6th
1976	European Formula Three	KWS Autotechnik Team	7	0	0	0	1	13	5th
1976	German Formula Three	KWS Autotechnik Team	5	0	1	0	3	77	**2nd**
1976	Italian Formula Three	KWS Autotechnik Team	?	0	0	0	0	0	NC
1976	Challenge de Formule Renault Europe		?	?	?	?	?	0	?
1977	Deutsche Rennsport Meisterschaft	BMW Junior Team	8	1	1	1	4	82	5th
1977	European Formula Two	Hohmann Auto Technik	7	0	0	0	0	5	13th
1977	European Formula Two	March Racing	1	0	0	0	0	5	13th
1978	European Formula Two	Polifac BMW Junior Team	12	0	1	1	9	48	**2nd**
1978	Deutsche Rennsport Meisterschaft	BMW Schweiz	1	0	0	0	1	12	21st
1978	Japanese Formula Two		1	1	0	?	1	0	NC
1978	World Sportscar Championship	Artos Francy Sauber PP AG	1	0	0	0	0	0	NC
1978	24 Hours of Le Mans	Artos Francy Sauber PP AG	1	0	0	0	0	N/A	NC
1979	European Formula Two	Polifac BMW Junior Team	12	2	2	1	6	38	**1st**
1979	BMW M1 Procar Championship	BMW Schweiz	5	0	1	0	0	23	11th
1979	Deutsche Rennsport Meisterschaft		2	0	0	0	0	2	43rd
1979	Formula One	Team Ensign	1	0	0	0	0	0	NC
1980	Formula One	Team ATS	9	0	0	0	0	0	NC
1980	BMW M1 Procar Championship	Sauber Motorsport	6	0	2	1	2	37	8th
1981	Formula One	Theodore Racing Team	7	0	0	0	0	4	16th
1981	Formula One	Ensign Racing	6	0	0	1	0	4	16th
1981	World Sportscar Championship	Würth-Lubrifilm Team Sauber	6	0	0	0	0	26.5	89th
1981	European Formula Two	Marcus Hotz Racing	2	0	0	1	0	0	NC
1981	24 Hours of Le Mans	Würth-Lubrifilm Team Sauber	1	0	0	0	0	N/A	DNF
1981	IMSA GT Championship		?	?	?	?	?	12	36th
1982	Formula One	Ragno Arrows	12	0	0	0	0	3	21st
1982	World Sportscar Championship	Ford Germany w/ Zakspeed	3	0	1	0	0	8	55th
1982	24 Hours of Le Mans	Ford Germany w/ Zakspeed	1	0	0	0	0	N/A	DNF
1983	Formula One	Arrows Racing Team	15	0	0	0	0	4	15th
1984	Formula One	Barclay Nordica Arrows	15	0	0	0	0	1	20th
1984	World Sportscar Championship	Porsche Kremer Racing	1	0	0	0	0	8	53rd
1985	Formula One	Olivetti Racing	12	0	0	0	0	5	13th
1985	World Sportscar Championship	Porsche Kremer Racing	6	1	0	0	2	45	9th
1986	Formula One	Barclay Arrows BMW	5	0	0	0	0	0	NC
1986	European Touring Car Championship	Juma Team	1	0	0	0	0	10	?
2005	Porsche Supercup	Porsche AG	1	0	0	0	0	0	NC†
2010	Volkswagen Scirocco R-Cup		1	0	0	0	0	0	NC†
2012	Volkswagen Scirocco R-Cup		1	0	0	0	0	0	NC†

^{†} As Surer was a guest driver, he was ineligible for championship points.

=== Complete European Formula Two Championship results ===
(key) (Races in bold indicate pole position; races in italics indicate fastest lap)

Year	Entrant	Chassis	Engine	1	2	3	4	5	6	7	8	9	10	11	12	13	Pos.	Pts
1976	Hohmann Racing	Chevron B35	BMW	HOC	THR	VLL	SAL	PAU	HOC	ROU	MUG	PER	EST	NOG	HOC; DNQ		NC	0
1977	Hohmann Auto Technik	March 762	BMW	SIL; 9	THR; 7	HOC; Ret	NÜR	VLL; 7	PAU	MUG; 5	ROU; Ret	NOG; 7	PER	MIS	EST		13th	5
1977	March Engineering	March 772P	BMW													DON; 4	13th	5
1978	Polifac BMW Junior Team	March 782	BMW	THR; 2	HOC; 2	NÜR; 4	PAU; 3	MUG; 2	VLL; 9	ROU; 3	DON; 3	NOG; 2	PER; Ret	MIS; 2	**HOC**; 2		**2nd**	**51**
1979	Polifac BMW Junior Team	March 792	BMW	SIL; DNS	**HOC**; Ret	THR; 9	NÜR; 1	VLL; 1	MUG; Ret	**PAU**; 3	HOC; 5	ZAN; 3	PER; Ret	MIS; 3	DON; 2		**1st**	**38**
1981	Marcus Hotz Racing	March 812	BMW	SIL	HOC; Ret	THR; 12	NÜR	VLL	MUG	PAU	PER	SPA	DON	MIS	MAN		NC	0

=== Complete Formula One World Championship results ===
(key) (races in italics indicate fastest lap)

Year	Entrant	Chassis	Engine	1	2	3	4	5	6	7	8	9	10	11	12	13	14	15	16	WDC	Points
1979	Team Ensign	Ensign N179	Cosworth V8	ARG	BRA	RSA	USW	ESP	BEL	MON	FRA	GBR	GER	AUT	NED	ITA; DNQ	CAN; DNQ	USA; Ret		NC	0
1980	Team ATS	ATS D3	Cosworth V8	ARG; Ret	BRA; 7															NC	0
1980	Team ATS	ATS D4	Cosworth V8			RSA; DNS	USW	BEL	MON	FRA; Ret	GBR; Ret	GER; 12	AUT; 12	NED; 10	ITA; Ret	CAN; DNQ	USA; 8			NC	0
1981	Ensign Racing	Ensign N180B	Cosworth V8	USW; Ret	BRA; 4	ARG; Ret	SMR; 9	BEL; 11	MON; 6	ESP										16th	4
1981	Theodore Racing Team	Theodore TY01	Cosworth V8								FRA; 12	GBR; 11	GER; 14	AUT; Ret	NED; 8	ITA; DNQ	CAN; 9	CPL; Ret		16th	4
1982	Ragno Arrows	Arrows A4	Cosworth V8	RSA	BRA	USW	SMR	BEL; 7	MON; 9	DET; 8	CAN; 5	NED; 10	GBR; Ret	FRA; 13	GER; 6	AUT; Ret		ITA; Ret		21st	3
1982	Ragno Arrows	Arrows A5	Cosworth V8														SUI; 15		CPL; 7	21st	3
1983	Arrows Racing Team	Arrows A6	Cosworth V8	BRA; 6	USW; 5	FRA; 10	SMR; 6	MON; Ret	BEL; 11	DET; 11	CAN; Ret	GBR; 17	GER; 7	AUT; Ret	NED; 8	ITA; 10	EUR; Ret	RSA; 8		15th	4
1984	Barclay Nordica Arrows	Arrows A6	Cosworth V8	BRA; 7	RSA; 9	BEL; 8		FRA; Ret	MON; DNQ	CAN; Ret	DET; Ret									20th	1
1984	Barclay Nordica Arrows	Arrows A7	BMW Str-4 t/c				SMR; Ret					DAL; Ret	GBR; 11	GER; Ret	AUT; 6	NED; Ret	ITA; Ret	EUR; Ret	POR; Ret	20th	1
1985	Olivetti Racing	Brabham BT54	BMW Str-4 t/c	BRA	POR	SMR	MON	CAN; 15	DET; 8	FRA; 8	GBR; 6	GER; Ret	AUT; 6	NED; 10	ITA; 4	BEL; 8	EUR; Ret	RSA; Ret	AUS; Ret	13th	5
1986	Barclay Arrows BMW	Arrows A8	BMW Str-4 t/c	BRA; Ret	ESP; Ret	SMR; 9	MON; 9	BEL; 9	CAN	DET	FRA	GBR	GER	HUN	AUT	ITA	POR	MEX	AUS	NC	0

=== Complete 24 Hours of Le Mans results ===
Year	Team	Co-Drivers	Car	Class	Laps	Pos.	Class Pos.
1978	(Switzerland) Artos Francy Sauber PP AG	(Switzerland) Eugen Straehl (Switzerland) Harry Blumer	Sauber C 5	S 2.0	257	NC	NC
1981	(Switzerland) Würth-Lubrifilm Team Sauber	(Canada) David Deacon (Austria) Dieter Quester	BMW M1	Gr.5	207	DNF	DNF
1982	(West Germany) Ford Germany (West Germany) Zakspeed	(West Germany) Klaus Ludwig (West Germany) Manfred Winkelhock	Ford C100	C	67	DNF	DNF

=== 24 Hours of Spa results ===
Year	Entrant	No.	Car	Drivers	Class	Laps	Pos.	Class Pos.
1985	(Germany) Schnitzer Racing	5	BMW 635 CSi	(Italy) Roberto Ravaglia (Austria) Gerhard Berger	Group A	500	**1st**	**1st**

== Sources ==
- Profile at www.grandprix.com

Sporting positions
Preceded by Bruno Giacomelli	European Formula Two; Champion; 1979	Succeeded by Brian Henton
