= 2024 Historic Grand Prix of Monaco =

← Previous race
- Circuit de Monaco

Race details
- Date: 10–12 May 2024
- Official name: 14e Grand Prix de Monaco Historique
- Location: Circuit de Monaco
- Course: Street circuit
- Course length: 3.337 km (2.074 miles)

The 2024 Historic Grand Prix of Monaco was the fourteenth running of the Historic Grand Prix of Monaco, a motor racing event for heritage Grand Prix, Voiturettes, Formula One, Formula Two and Sports cars.

== Report ==
Six of Ayrton Senna's most significant racing cars were demonstrated around the circuit between Saturday qualifying sessions, paying tribute thirty years after his fatal accident at the 1994 San Marino Grand Prix. These were his 1977 South American Championship winning kart (driven by Gabriel Bortoleto), his 1982 British and European Formula Ford 2000 championship winning Van Diemen (Cristina Gutiérrez), his 1983 Macau Grand Prix winning Ralt (Eddie Irvine), the Toleman TG184 in which he scored his first F1 podium at the 1984 Monaco Grand Prix (contemporary teammate Stefan Johansson), the Lotus 97T in which he took his first victory at the 1985 Portuguese Grand Prix (Thierry Boutsen) and his 1990 championship-winning McLaren MP4/5B (Bruno Senna). The drivers were joined by Prince Albert II, who had been among the dignitaries present during his Monaco Grand Prix victories.

=== Série A1 ===
Paddins Dowling (ERA R5B) took his second victory, leading from pole to finish ahead of Brad Baker (ERA R10B) who finished second. Michael Birch (Maserati 4CM) had a poor launch from third on the grid, but managed to recover his original position by the end of the opening lap and begin troubling Baker. He got by on lap 2, but Baker stayed with him and retook the position on the exit of Sainte Devote on lap 4. Baker pulled away, setting the fastest lap of the race, but was unable to close the gap to Dowling. On the exit of Saint Devote on lap 8, Thierry Stapts (Bugatti 35) lost drive and was hit by Ralf Emmerling (Riley Brooklands). Emmerling was able to continue to the finish. 2021 winner Patrick Blakeney-Edwards (Frazer Nash Monoplace) did not qualify, having lost a valve during practice and been unable to set a qualifying lap. Fritz Burkard (Alfa Romeo 8C Monza) qualified seventh, but did not start the race.

=== Série A2 ===
Claudia Hürtgen took her third victory (and second consecutive in the race for historic sports cars), leading the entire race from Marino Franchitti. Mark Shaw (Scarab) qualified a strong sixth but broke down on the formation lap. Ewen Sergison (Lotus 16) retired before the start. Max Smith-Hilliard qualified third, only to fall victim to his Lotus 16's notoriously unreliable "queerbox": the car became stuck in gear and stalled on the grid, with all drivers safely navigating past. For most of the race, Tony Wood (Tec-Mec) pressured Joaquín Folch-Rusiñol (Lotus 16) for third place, with Guillermo Fierro-Eleta closely following the pair. Fierro-Eleta passed both for third in traffic at Mirabeau. Folch-Rusiñol spun from fourth after the Piscine late in the race, allowing Wood to take third.

=== Série B ===
Race B quickly became a duel between Andy Middlehurst (Lotus 25) and Joe Colasacco (Ferrari 1512). Both got a good launch and pulled away from the rest of the field, with Colasacco mounting a strong challenge over the first few laps before Middlehurst increased the gap. In the congestion at the start of the race, "Mister John of B" (Lola Mk4) collided with Dan Collins (Lotus 21) on the rise to Beau Rivage, forcing the former into a first-lap retirement. Later on that lap, Philipp Buhofer (BRM P261), who had risen to third, spun on the exit of the Piscine. Colasacco remained close to Middlehurst until lap 6, when the latter made a bold move to lap the Rob Walker Brabham of Sidney Hoole at Portier and pulled a slight gap. Colasacco caught back up, setting the fastest lap along the way, but was unable to take the lead.

=== Série C ===
Many of the fast drivers in practice, including Gregor Fisken and Martin Hunt in HWM-Jaguars, Martin Halusa (Jaguar D-Type) and Guillermo Fierro-Eleta (Maserati 300S), were penalised and started toward the rear of the grid. Max Smith-Hilliard (Lotus 10) got a poor launch from third on the grid, while Tony Wood in fifth directly behind him stormed to third position. On the front row, Richard Wilson (Maserati 250S) got a great launch to take the lead from polesitter Frederic Wakeman (Cooper T38). Wakeman would regain the lead on the second lap. Adrian Sucari (Maserati A6GCS) spun under braking at the Grand Hotel Hairpin from thirteenth position on the opening lap. By the end of the opening lap, Halusa had risen from 22nd to ninth, Fisken from 24th to tenth and Fierro-Eleta from 23rd to 13th. Wakemen retook the lead by passing Wilson around the outside at Massenet on the second lap, while Claudia Hürtgen (Maserati 300S) took third from Wood going into Tabac. Hürtgen was baulked by a lapped car at the Piscine, allowing Max Smith-Hilliard (Lotus 10) to pass for third. Wilson made a lunge at Sainte Devote on lap 7, avoiding contact with the leader but allowing Smith-Hilliard to close up. Wilson's race would end with a spin out of Casino Square on the following lap. The gap between Wakeman and Smith-Hilliard was 2.5 seconds at the end of lap 8, but the latter closed up in traffic and made a bold move to take the lead at Portier on the final lap, while Wakeman spun and ended up seventh. By the end of the race, Halusa and Fisken had each risen 19 places from their starting positions.

=== Série D ===
A significant entrant to Race D was multiple CART and IndyCar race winner Adrián Fernández, having acquired the 1970 Belgian Grand Prix winning BRM P153 of countryman Pedro Rodríguez with help from the organisers of the Mexico City Grand Prix. He qualified a strong sixth but would not make the start, owing to a broken differential shaft. Famed Formula One engineer Adrian Newey returned in his Lotus 49B for the first time since 2018. Roald Goethe (McLaren M19A) and Ewen Sergison (Surtees TS9B) both stalled before the formation lap. Sergison retired on the spot, while Goethe was able to obtain a push start and began from the pit lane. Tom Hartley, Jr. (March 701) and Newey both stalled on the grid, but were able to continue the race. Katsuaki Kubota (Lotus 72) fell to third off the line, allowing Matthew Wrigley (March 721G) to chase polesitter Michael Lyons (Surtees TS9), the top three pulling away from the rest of the field. Newey overtook Nicolas Matile (Matra MS120B) out of the Grand Hotel Hairpin for seventh place on lap 2. David Shaw (Eifelland E21) ran fourth until he retired into the pits after four laps. Wrigley outbraked himself into Saint Devote on lap 8, allowing Kubota into second but not losing any further positions. Lyons' strong lead ended in retirement on lap 9, when his steering seized at the Piscine and he was forced into the pits. Kubota thus took his second Monaco victory in the Lotus 72, having won the 2014 event. "Mister John of B" (Matra MS120C) passed Franco Meiners in the experimental Ferrari 312B3 for third at the Nouvelle Chicane on the final lap. Meiners then spun at La Rascasse, which allowed Newey to finish fourth.

=== Série E ===
Toni Seiler (Shadow DN1) stalled on the grid. Marco Werner (Lotus 76) passed Nick Padmore (Lotus 77) for second place into Sainte Devote, while Matthew Wrigley lost the rear end of his Penske PC3 on the exit and lost seventh to Frédéric Lajoux (Surtees TS19), but would pressure him for the next few laps. James Davison (Hill GH1) stopped on the entrance to Le Tunnel on lap 3. Douglas Mockett (Penske PC4) spun at La Rascasse on lap 5, while Steve Brooks (Embassy Hill Lola T370) turned into James Hagan (Hesketh 308) at Sainte Devote. Polesitter Stuart Hall (McLaren M23) shot into a lead he would never relinquish. There was a close fight for second between Werner, Padmore and Michael Lyons (McLaren M26), only for Werner to retire on lap 6 with a broken second-gear dog ring. Guillaume Roman (Ensign N175) parked his car before Le Tunnel on lap 10.

=== Série F ===
Notable entrants were current McLaren and United Autosports team principal Zak Brown, Jumbo Supermarkten and Racing Team Nederland boss Frits van Eerd, British GT race winner Lee Mowle and two-time 24 Hours of Daytona winner and IMSA team owner Wayne Taylor (driving a Wolf WR4 once raced by friend and countryman Jody Scheckter).

Taylor got a better launch than Harald Becker (Arrows A3) on the row ahead of him, but the two collided and retired on the spot. Stephen Shanly (Tyrrell 010) qualified a remarkable third on his debut at the event, only to spin on the exit of the Piscine. The race was red-flagged and started again with 15 of the original 18 laps, with Brown and Richard Maydon (LEC CRP1) retiring. The second start was abandoned while Michael Cantillon and Luciano Biamino stalled on the grid. Marc Devis (Lotus 78) retired into the pits. Once the race finally got underway, Michael Lyons and Miles Griffiths shot into first and second. On the second lap, Mowle tried a move on Mark Hazell at Portier but could not pass. Michael Cantillon (Tyrrell 010) attempted to pass Martin Overington (Hesketh 308E) for tenth place in Le Tunnel, only to force Overington into the wall and cause a second red flag. The race was restarted for a second time with 10 laps scheduled, this time with a safety car start to avoid stressing the clutches of the cars. Again, Lyons and Griffiths gapped the rest of the field, with Griffiths applying intense pressure to the leader. Mark Hazell and Jamie Constable fought for fourth place, but made contact at Mirabeau Haute on lap 4 which forced Constable out of the race. Nicolas Matile (March 771) was in a three-car battle for twelfth with van Eerd and David Shaw (Williams FW06), only to hit the barrier on the exit of Tabac on lap 5. This brought out a third red flag, this time ending the race.

=== Série G ===
Nicholas Pink (Arrows A5) stalled on the formation lap while Richard Hope (Alfa Romeo 182) stalled on the starting grid, but the latter was able to continue. Niklas Halusa (Williams FW08) spun on entry to the Nouvelle Chicane on lap 2. On lap 3, Steve Brooks (Lotus 91) attempted to pass Mark Hazell (Williams FW08C) into the Nouvelle Chicane, but made contact. Marino Franchitti (Tyrrell 012) pressured Nick Padmore (Lotus 88B) for fourth, and got past on lap 5 when Padmore appeared to slow out of the Nouvelle Chicane. On lap 6, Steve Hartley (Arrows A6) was baulked by the cars around him and crashed on entry to the Nouvelle Chicane, which brought out the safety car. Padmore retired shortly after. Stuart Hall (March 821), Marco Werner (Lotus 87B) and Michael Lyons (Lotus 92) pulled away from the rest of the field at the restart. Going into Sainte Devote on lap 11, Mark Higson (McLaren MP4B) made a late attempt to pass Piero Lottini (Osella FA1B/81). The two made contact, with Higson losing a front wheel and retiring on the spot. The following lap, Michael Cantillon (Williams FW07C) attempted to pass Ken Tyrrell (Tyrrell 011) for seventh on the inside at Mirabeau Haute, damaging a steering arm and coming to a stop at the Grand Hotel hairpin. This briefly promoted Laurent Fort (Ensign N180B) to tenth until he spun at Virage Antony Noghès, but he was still able to finish twelfth. Franchitti caught the back of Lyons but was unable to pass him for the final spot on the podium, the two separated by just a few car lengths at the chequered flag.

== Results ==
=== Summary ===
Série	Namesake	Cars	Years	Pole position		Fastest lap		Race winner
A1	Louis Chiron	Grand Prix	Pre-war	(Republic of Ireland) Paddins Dowling	2:05.965	(Canada) Brad Baker	2:05.983	(Republic of Ireland) Paddins Dowling
A2	Juan Manuel Fangio	Formula 1 - front engine	Pre-1961	(Germany) Claudia Hürtgen	1:54.429	(Germany) Claudia Hürtgen	1:53.822	(Germany) Claudia Hürtgen
B	Graham Hill	Formula 1 Formula 2	1961-1965; 1956-1960	(United Kingdom) Andy Middlehurst	1:48.088	(United States) Joe Colasacco	1:47.159	(United Kingdom) Andy Middlehurst
C	Vittorio Marzotto	Sports cars - front engine	1952-1957	(United Kingdom) Frederic Wakeman	1:59.770	(Germany) Claudia Hürtgen	2:01.520	(United Kingdom) Max Smith-Hilliard
D	Jackie Stewart	Formula 1	1966-1972	(United Kingdom) Michael Lyons	1:34.006	(Japan) Katsuaki Kubota	1:33.839	(Japan) Katsuaki Kubota
E	Niki Lauda	Formula 1	1973-1976	(United Kingdom) Stuart Hall	1:31.629	(United Kingdom) Stuart Hall	1:32.558	(United Kingdom) Stuart Hall
F	Gilles Villeneuve	Formula 1	1977-1980	(United Kingdom) Michael Lyons	1:32.079	(United Kingdom) Miles Griffiths	1:31.414	(United Kingdom) Michael Lyons
G	Ayrton Senna	Formula 1	1981-1985	(United Kingdom) Stuart Hall	1:30.762	(United Kingdom) Stuart Hall	1:30.669	(United Kingdom) Stuart Hall

=== Série A1: Pre-war Grand Prix cars and Voiturettes ===
Pos.	No.	Driver	Car	Year	Laps	Time/retired	Grid
1	54	(Republic of Ireland) Paddins Dowling	ERA R5B	1936	10	21:21.875	1
2	56	(Canada) Brad Baker	ERA R10B	1936	10	+14.623	2
3	70	(United Kingdom) Michael Birch	Maserati 4CM	1935	10	+48.033	3
4	72	(Germany) "Mark" Winter	Maserati 6CM	1936	10	+1:04.135	5
5	12	(United Kingdom) Jonathan Bailey	Bugatti 35C	1927	10	+1:07.428	4
6	10	(Austria) Martin Halusa	Bugatti 35B	1927	10	+1:58.409	6
7	16	(Italy) Stefano Rosina	Bugatti 37/44	1927	9	+1 lap	13
8	6	(France) François Fouquet-Hatevilain	Bugatti 35	1925	9	+1 lap	7
9	8	(United Kingdom) Julia de Baldanza	Bugatti 35B	1928	9	+1 lap	12
10	14	(Italy) Maurizio Piantelli	Bugatti 37A	1927	9	+1 lap	11
11	2	(France) Ralf Emmerling	Riley Brooklands	1928	9	+1 lap	9
12	4	(United States) John Gillett	MG K3 Magnette	1934	8	+2 laps	10
13	18	(France) Thierry Stapts	Bugatti 35	1926	7	+3 laps	8
14	58	(France) Thierry Chanoine	Riley Dobbs	1935	3	+7 laps	14
DNS	28	(Switzerland) Fritz Burkard	Alfa Romeo 8C Monza	1933			
DNQ	52	(United Kingdom) Patrick Blakeney-Edwards	Frazer Nash Monoplace	1935			

=== Série A2: Front-engined Grand Prix cars built before 1961 ===
Pos.	No.	Driver	Car	Year	Laps	Time/retired	Grid
1	20	(Germany) Claudia Hürtgen	Ferrari Dino 246	1960	10	19:28.117	1
2	32	(United Kingdom) Marino Franchitti	Maserati 250F	1957	10	+15.440	2
3	60	(United Kingdom) Tony Wood	Tec-Mec F415	1959	10	+16.772	7
4	30	(Spain) Guillermo Fierro-Eleta	Maserati 250F	1954	10	+17.386	5
5	34	(United Kingdom) John Spiers	Maserati 250F	1955	10	+19.641	8
6	58	(Belgium) Stéphane de Groodt	Maserati 250F	1958	10	+41.215	9
7	62	(Austria) Thomas Schlereth	Ferguson P99	1960	10	+46.898	10
8	56	(Canada) Brad Baker	Maserati 250F	1954	10	+1:39.594	12
9	6	(United Kingdom) Guy Plante	Cooper T23 (Mk2)	1953	10	+1:55.548	13
10	50	(United States) Jeffrey O'Neill	Maserati 250F	1957	9	+1 lap	15
11	8	(Belgium) Paul Grant	Cooper T23 (Mk2)	1953	9	+1 lap	11
12	12	(United Kingdom) Michael Birch	Connaught B2	1955	9	+1 lap	17
13	28	(Belgium) Christian Dumolin	Maserati 250F	1954	9	+1 lap	19
14	4	(United Kingdom) Niamh Wood	Cooper T20 (Mk1)	1952	9	+1 lap	16
15	26	(Canada) Denis Bigioni	Talbot-Lago T26C	1948	9	+1 lap	18
16	42	(United Kingdom) Marshall Bailey	Lotus 16	1959	9	+1 lap	24
17	36	(United Kingdom) Kurt Engelhorn	Maserati 250F	1955	8	+2 laps	22
18	14	(United Kingdom) Julia de Baldanza	Maserati A6GCM	1952	8	+2 laps	25
19	24	(Spain) Jaime Bergel Sainz de Baranda	Maserati 4CLT/48	1949	8	+2 laps	23
20	16	(France) Eric Leroy	Gordini T11/15	1946	8	+2 laps	PL
21	40	(Spain) Joaquín Folch-Rusiñol	Lotus 16	1958	7	+3 laps	4
22	2	(Italy) Massimo Di Risio	OSCA MT4	1949	7	+3 laps	20
23	18	(France) Jean-Jacques Bally	Gordini T11/15	1947	5	+5 laps	21
Ret	44	(United Kingdom) Max Smith-Hilliard	Lotus 16	1958	0	+10 laps	3
DNS	46	(United Kingdom) Ewen Sergison	Lotus 16	1959			14
DNS	48	(United Kingdom) Mark Shaw	Scarab F1	1960			6

=== Série B: Rear-engine Grand Prix Cars, 1500, F1 (1961 to 1965) and F2 (1956-1960) ===
Pos.	No.	Driver	Car	Year	Laps	Time/retired	Grid
1	6	(United Kingdom) Andy Middlehurst	Lotus 25	1962	10	18:14.309	1
2	4	(United States) Joe Colasacco	Ferrari 1512	1964	10	+0.786	2
3	7	(United Kingdom) Mark Shaw	Lotus 21	1961	10	+36.366	5
4	22	(Austria) Lukas Halusa	Brabham BT7	1963	10	+40.316	3
5	25	(United Kingdom) Chris Drake	Cooper T71/T73	1964	10	+52.277	6
6	34	(Italy) Andrea Stortoni	Lotus 18	1961	10	+1:18.219	7
7	15	(United Kingdom) Dan Collins	Lotus 21	1961	10	+1:27.952	10
8	5	(United Kingdom) Andy Willis	BRM P578	1962	10	+1:31.451	9
9	50	(United Kingdom) James Hagan	Lotus 18	1960	10	+1:41.027	13
10	8	(United Kingdom) Nick Taylor	Lotus 18	1960	10	+1:41.269	8
11	32	(Japan) Katsuaki Kubota	Lotus 24	1962	10	+1:48.442	15
12	23	(Switzerland) Stephan Jöbstl	Lotus 24	1962	10	+1:48.953	11
13	24	(Switzerland) Philipp Buhofer	BRM P261	1964	10	+1:51.103	4
14	20	(United Kingdom) Teifion Salisbury	Lotus 18	1961	9	+1 lap	14
15	56	(United Kingdom) John Clark	Cooper T56	1961	9	+1 lap	16
16	1	(United States) John Romano	Brabham BT11	1964	9	+1 lap	17
17	44	(United Kingdom) Jason Timms	Cooper T53	1961	9	+1 lap	18
18	16	(United Kingdom) Clinton McCarthy	Lotus 18	1960	9	+1 lap	20
19	58	(Belgium) Tom de Gres	Brabham BT14	1965	9	+1 lap	21
20	19	(United Kingdom) Sidney Hoole	Cooper T66	1963	9	+1 lap	23
21	18	(United Kingdom) Elliott Hann	Cooper T41	1957	9	+1 lap	27
22	46	(United States) Kurt DelBene	BRP-BRM	1964	9	+1 lap	22
23	52	(Australia) Flavio Puccinelli	Cooper T53	1960	9	+1 lap	24
24	21	(Belgium) Erik Staes	Lotus 18/21	1961	9	+1 lap	26
25	12	(United Kingdom) Stuart Tizzard	Cooper T43	1957	9	+1 lap	29
26	48	(United Kingdom) Robert Pulleyn	Lotus 18	1960	9	+1 lap	28
27	54	(Italy) Marco Cajani	De Tomaso F1	1961	7	+3 laps	30
28	2	(Italy) Federico Buratti	Lotus 24	1962	6	+4 laps	19
Ret	9	(United Kingdom) Costas Michael	Cooper T73	1964	3	+7 laps	25
No lap	28	(France) "Mister John of B"	Lola Mk4	1962	0	+10 laps	12
DNS	35	(United Kingdom) Julian Ellison	Assegai	1961			
PO	14	(United Kingdom) Richard Wilson	Cooper T60	1962			
PO	80	(France) Philippe Bonny	Brabham BT2	1963			

=== Série C: Sports Racing cars - front engines (1952–1957) ===
Pos.	No.	Driver	Car	Year	Laps	Time/retired	Grid
1	10	(United Kingdom) Max Smith-Hilliard	Lotus 10	1955	10	20:42.312	3
2	84	(Germany) Claudia Hürtgen	Maserati 300S	1955	10	+8.053	4
3	60	(Austria) Niklas Halusa	Jaguar D-Type	1954	10	+18.973	22
4	36	(United Kingdom) Tony Wood	Lister-Bristol	1955	10	+22.113	5
5	64	(United Kingdom) Gregor Fisken	HWM-Jaguar	1953	10	+23.544	24
6	62	(United Kingdom) Martin Hunt	HWM-Jaguar Sport	1954	10	+25.826	6
7	70	(United Kingdom) Frederic Wakeman	Cooper T38	1955	10	+31.426	1
8	8	(United Kingdom) Richard Bourne	Lotus 10	1955	10	+31.777	7
9	82	(Spain) Guillermo Fierro-Eleta	Maserati 300S	1957	10	+44.536	23
10	86	(Canada) Brad Baker	Maserati 300S	1955	10	+47.643	8
11	58	(United Kingdom) Nicolas Bert	Jaguar C-Type	1952	10	+50.347	25
12	68	(Argentina) Manuel Eliçabe	Cooper T38 (Mk2)	1955	10	+1:25.368	27
13	54	(United States) Tazio Ottis	Ferrari 750 Monza	1955	10	+1:28.955	26
14	52	(United Kingdom) David Franklin	Ferrari 250 MM	1953	10	+1:38.291	10
15	66	(Germany) Katarina Kyvalova	Cooper T33	1954	10	+1:50.988	11
16	56	(United Kingdom) Nigel Webb	Jaguar C-Type	1952	10	+2:06.383	28
17	28	(United Kingdom) Tim Child	Frazer Nash Le Mans Replica (Mk2)	1952	10	+2:09.418	13
18	24	(Germany) Lutz Rathenow	Veritas RS2000	1948	10	+2:13.529	12
19	38	(United Kingdom) Stephen Bond	Lister Flat Iron	1955	9	+1 lap	14
20	74	(Belgium) Maxime Castelein	Aston Martin DB3S	1953	9	+1 lap	30
21	72	(Germany) Wolfgang Friedrichs	Aston Martin DB3S	1954	9	+1 lap	29
22	12	(Belgium) Erik Staes	Lotus 11	1956	9	+1 lap	31
23	20	(France) Jean-Jacques Bally	Maserati A6GCS	1953	9	+1 lap	15
24	6	(Germany) Bernd Langewiesche	Lotus 9	1955	9	+1 lap	32
25	34	(United Kingdom) Paul Griffin	Connaught ALSR	1954	9	+1 lap	16
26	16	(Italy) Carlo Incerti	OSCA MT4-AD	1955	9	+1 lap	33
27	90	(France) Didier Marty	Allard J2	1950	9	+1 lap	18
28	30	(United States) John Breslow	Frazer Nash Le Mans Replica (Mk2)	1952	8	+2 laps	19
29	2	(United Kingdom) Thomas Rawlings	Connaught L2	1948	8	+2 laps	34
30	26	(United Kingdom) Steve Ward	Frazer Nash Le Mans Replica (Mk1)	1950	8	+2 laps	20
31	80	(United Kingdom) Richard Wilson	Maserati 250S	1957	7	+3 laps	2
32	32	(France) Pierre Macchi	Frazer Nash Le Mans Coupé	1953	7	+3 laps	17
DNS	18	(Argentina) Adrian Sucari	Maserati A6GCS	1954			9
DNS	88	(United States) Jeffrey O'Neill	Maserati 350S	1956			21
PO	4	(Germany) Joachim van Finckenstein	Kieft Sport	1954			
PO	22	(Argentina) Carlos Sielecki	Maserati A6GCS	1954			
PO	76	(Argentina) Mathias Sielecki	Aston Martin DB3S	1955			
DNP	50	(Spain) Jaime Bergel Sainz de Baranda	Pegaso Z-102	1952			

=== Série D: F1 Grand Prix cars 3L (1966–1972) ===
Pos.	No.	Driver	Car	Year	Laps	Time/retired	Grid
1	2	(Japan) Katsuaki Kubota	Lotus 72	1971	12	19:26.639	2
2	5	(United Kingdom) Matthew Wrigley	March 721G	1972	12	+16.084	3
3	16	(France) "Mister John of B"	Matra MS120C	1972	12	+47.835	10
4	3	(United Kingdom) Adrian Newey	Lotus 49B	1968	12	+59.357	8
5	12	(Monaco) Franco Meiners	Ferrari 312B3	1972	12	+1:01.789	7
6	1	(United Kingdom) Tom Hartley, Jr.	March 701	1970	12	+1:29.683	9
7	28	(Germany) Harald Becker	March 701	1970	11	+1 lap	14
8	15	(Monaco) Roald Goethe	McLaren M19A	1971	11	+1 lap	12
9	21	(Monaco) Nicolas Matile	Matra MS120B	1971	10	+2 laps	11
10	22	(United Kingdom) Michael Lyons	Surtees TS9	1971	8	+4 laps	1
11	27	(United Kingdom) David Shaw	Eifelland E21	1972	4	+8 laps	5
DNS	7	(United Kingdom) Ewen Sergison	Surtees TS9B	1971			4
DNS	19	(Mexico) Adrián Fernández	BRM P153	1970			6
DNS	9	(United Kingdom) Shaun Lynn	Brabham BT37	1972			13
PO	11	(Germany) Claudia Hürtgen	Ferrari 312	1969			
PO	23	(Italy) Bruno Ferrari	March 701	1970			

=== Série E: F1 Grand Prix cars 3L (1973–1976) ===
Pos.	No.	Driver	Car	Year	Laps	Time/retired	Grid
1	33	(United Kingdom) Stuart Hall	McLaren M23	1973	18	28:14.245	1
2	6	(United Kingdom) Nick Padmore	Lotus 77	1976	18	+3.540	2
3	1	(United Kingdom) Michael Lyons	McLaren M26	1976	18	+4.898	4
4	2	(Austria) Lukas Halusa	McLaren M23	1976	18	+22.306	6
5	29	(United Kingdom) Matthew Wrigley	Penske PC3	1975	18	+52.970	7
6	19	(Monaco) Frédéric Lajoux	Surtees TS19	1976	18	+1:27.444	8
7	18	(Belgium) Marc Devis	Surtees TS16	1974	17	+1 lap	13
8	27	(United Kingdom) Steve Brooks	Lola T370	1974	17	+1 lap	10
9	16	(Switzerland) Jean-Denis Delétraz	Shadow DN3	1974	17	+1 lap	11
10	5	(United States) Christopher Locke	Lotus 77	1976	16	+2 laps	16
11	23	(France) Philippe Bonny	Trojan T103	1974	16	+2 laps	19
12	12	(Italy) Andrea Burani	Ferrari 312B3	1974	16	+2 laps	20
13	14	(Monaco) Fabrice Notari	Shadow DN1	1973	16	+2 laps	17
14	28	(United States) Stanley Fulton	Penske PC3	1975	15	+3 laps	21
15	31	(Italy) Marco Fumagalli	Ensign N174	1975	14	+4 laps	9
16	24	(United Kingdom) James Hagan	Hesketh 308	1974	11	+7 laps	14
17	37	(France) Guillaume Roman	Ensign N175	1975	8	+10 laps	12
18	3	(Germany) Marco Werner	Lotus 76	1974	5	+13 laps	3
19	34	(United States) Douglas Mockett	Penske PC4	1976	3	+15 laps	18
20	22	(Australia) James Davison	Hill GH1	1975	1	+17 laps	5
DNS	15	(Switzerland) Toni Seiler	Shadow DN1	1973			15
DNS	20	(Japan) Yutaka Toriba	Williams FW05	1976			
PO	4	(Monaco) Roald Goethe	Tyrrell 007	1974			
PO	17	(Italy) Marco Bianchini	Shadow DN5	1975			
DNA		(France) "Mister John of B"	Ferrari 312T	1975			

=== Série F: F1 Grand Prix cars 3L (1977–1980) ===
Pos.	No.	Driver	Car	Year	Laps	Time/retired	Grid
1	24	(United Kingdom) Michael Lyons	Hesketh 308E	1977	5	8:12.395	1
2	14	(United Kingdom) Miles Griffiths	Fittipaldi F5A	1977	5	+0.523	2
3	19	(France) Jonathan Cochet	Fittipaldi F6A	1979	5	+20.560	4
4	26	(United Kingdom) Mark Hazell	Williams FW07B	1980	5	+24.378	6
5	3	(United Kingdom) Michael Cantillon	Tyrrell 010	1980	5	+28.416	11
6	7	(United States) Carlos de Quesada	McLaren M26	1977	5	+29.778	9
7	6	(United Kingdom) Lee Mowle	Lotus 78	1977	5	+30.661	8
8	17	(United Kingdom) Ewen Sergison	Shadow DN9	1978	5	+36.295	12
9	25	(France) "Mister John of B"	Ligier JS11/15	1979	5	+40.560	10
10	15	(United Kingdom) Robert Spencer	Fittipaldi F5A	1977	5	+55.040	17
11	4	(United Kingdom) Stephen Shanly	Tyrrell 010	1980	5	+55.058	3
12	21	(Netherlands) Frits van Eerd	Fittipaldi F7	1980	5	+1:00.900	16
13	28	(United Kingdom) David Shaw	Williams FW06	1979	5	+1:01.166	5
14	10	(Italy) Gianluigi Candiani	Ensign N180	1980	5	+1:04.265	21
15	2	(Austria) Jürgen Boden	Ferrari 312T5	1980	5	+1:06.689	19
16	29	(Italy) Marco Coppini	Arrows A1B	1978	5	+1:16.364	20
17	9	(Monaco) Nicolas Matile	March 771	1977	4	+1 lap	13
18	11	(Italy) Luciano Biamino	Lotus 81	1980	4	+1 lap	25
19	16	(United Kingdom) Jamie Constable	Shadow DN8	1977	3	+2 laps	7
Ret	20	(United States) (South Africa) Wayne Taylor	Wolf WR4	1977	0	+5 laps	24
Ret	23	(United Kingdom) Martin Overington	Hesketh 308E	1977	0	+5 laps	23
Ret	27	(United States) Zak Brown	Williams FW07B	1980	0	+5 laps	18
Ret	30	(Germany) Harald Becker	Arrows A3	1980	0	+5 laps	22
Ret	31	(United Kingdom) Ronald Maydon	LEC CRP1	1977	0	+5 laps	15
DNS	5	(Belgium) Marc Devis	Lotus 78	1977			14
DNS	22	(United Kingdom) Paul Tattersall	Ensign N179	1979			26
DNP	33	(France) Patrick D'Aubreby	March 761	1977			
PO	18	(United Kingdom) Sam Hancock	Fittipaldi F8	1980			

=== Série G: F1 Grand Prix cars 3L (1981–1985) ===
Pos.	No.	Driver	Car	Year	Laps	Time/retired	Grid
1	19	(United Kingdom) Stuart Hall	March 821	1982	18	30:00.368	1
2	15	(Germany) Marco Werner	Lotus 87B	1982	18	+8.614	2
3	11	(United Kingdom) Michael Lyons	Lotus 92	1983	18	+15.847	3
4	9	(United Kingdom) Marino Franchitti	Tyrrell 012	1985	18	+16.073	5
5	4	(United Kingdom) Jamie Constable	Tyrrell 011	1983	18	+29.671	6
6	3	(United States) Ken Tyrrell	Tyrrell 011	1982	18	+45.371	7
7	12	(United Kingdom) Steve Brooks	Lotus 91	1982	18	+1:02.436	14
8	1	(Belgium) Christophe d'Ansembourg	Williams FW07C	1981	18	+1:05.331	10
9	29	(Italy) Valerio Leone	Arrows A6	1983	18	+1:06.886	13
10	35	(Netherlands) Frits van Eerd	Williams FW08C	1983	18	+1:16.806	16
11	25	(Italy) Massimilliano Girardo	Minardi M185	1985	17	+1 lap	19
12	14	(France) Laurent Fort	Ensign N180B	1980	17	+1 lap	15
13	18	(Argentina) Alejandro Walter Chahwan	March 811	1981	16	+2 laps	25
14	31	(Italy) Piero Lottini	Osella FA1B/81	1981	15	+3 laps	23
15	34	(United Kingdom) Mark Hazell	Williams FW08C	1983	14	+4 laps	11
16	30	(United Kingdom) Nicholas Pink	Arrows A5	1981	13	+5 laps	22
17	5	(United Kingdom) Martin Stretton	Tyrrell 012	1984	12	+6 laps	8
18	28	(United Kingdom) Michael Cantillon	Williams FW07C	1982	11	+7 laps	17
19	8	(United Kingdom) Mark Higson	McLaren MP4B	1982	10	+8 laps	20
20	10	(United Kingdom) Nick Padmore	Lotus 88B	1981	8	+10 laps	4
21	27	(Japan) Yutaka Toriba	Williams FW07C	1981	4	+14 laps	12
22	17	(United Kingdom) Steve Hartley	Arrows A6	1983	4	+14 laps	18
23	22	(United Kingdom) Richard Hope	Alfa Romeo 182	1982	3	+15 laps	24
24	6	(Austria) Niklas Halusa	Williams FW08	1982	1	+17 laps	9
DNS	7	(United Kingdom) Ian Simmonds	Tyrrell 012	1983			21
DNS	2	(Belgium) Werner d'Ansembourg	Brabham BT49D	1982			
DNQ	26	(France) Soheil Ayari	Ligier JS21	1983			
PO	32	(United Kingdom) Mark Dwyer	Osella FA1D	1983			
