= 2022 Historic Grand Prix of Monaco =

← Previous race	Next race →
- Circuit de Monaco

Race details
- Date: 13–15 May 2022
- Official name: 13e Grand Prix de Monaco Historique
- Location: Circuit de Monaco
- Course: Street circuit
- Course length: 3.337 km (2.074 miles)

The 2022 Historic Grand Prix of Monaco was the thirteenth running of the Historic Grand Prix of Monaco, a motor racing event for heritage Grand Prix, Voiturettes, Formula One, Formula Two and Sports cars.

== Report ==
=== Série A1 ===
In Race A1, second-placed qualifier Nicholas Topliss, driving ERA R4A, got the best launch and took the lead ahead of polesitter Mark Gillies (ERA R3A). He pulled a gap of a few seconds and appeared set for victory, until Gillies put on a charge and closed up behind him on lap 7 of 10. The two raced closely and began to catch lapped traffic around the same time. Trying to stay ahead, Topliss made a bold move to lap the Riley Dobbs of Thierry Chanoine at Sante Devote on lap 9, catching Chanoine unaware and making contact on the exit. Topliss retired from the race; Chanoine continued to finish sixth on the road, but a 10 second penalty for jumping the start demoted him to seventh. Patrick Blakeney-Edwards, driving a Frazer Nash Monoplace, had a storming opening few laps and moved from twelfth on the grid to fourth by the middle of the race. Topliss' retirement promoted him to the final step on the podium. Fritz Burkard (Maserati 4CL) had been strong in qualifying but started at the back of the grid. He gained twelve places to finish eighth.

=== Série A2 ===
Race A2 was won from pole by Claudia Hürtgen, driving a Ferrari 246 owned by Alex Birkenstock. Hürtgen was a late call-up: Birkenstock was entered for the car but could not attend due to family circumstances. She was followed closely throughout the race by Tony Wood (Tec-Mec F415) but appeared to have the measure of him. The battle for fourth place was hotly contested between Max Smith-Hilliard, Guillermo Fierro-Eleta and Joaquín Folch-Rusiñol. Smith-Hilliard made a bold overtaking move on Folch-Rusiñol into the Nouvelle Chicane, forcing Folch-Rusiñol off track; Folch-Rusiñol then straight-lined the chicane to maintain position. Both drivers received a 10 second penalty. Michael Birch (Connaught B) spun at Virage Antony Noghès on lap 9 of 10 and was immediately collected by Marshall Bailey and Folch-Rusiñol, who had just re-passed Smith-Hilliard. The two leaders, who were coming up to lap these cars at the same time, narrowly avoided a collision. The pile-up blocked the track and the race was red-flagged, with the results taken back to the end of lap 7. Marino Franchitti made his first race appearance at Monaco during this race, only for the driveshaft of his Maserati 250F to snap on the second lap.

=== Série B ===
Race B featured a tight battle between Joe Colasacco (Ferrari 1512) and Mark Shaw (Lotus 21), Shaw applying intense pressure until taking the lead after a bold move at Sainte Devote on lap 8 of 10. It was Colasacco's turn to apply pressure and, distracted, Shaw locked his brakes and went into the barrier at the same corner one lap later. Colasacco cruised unchallenged to victory.

=== Série C ===
Race C was a close fight between Frederic Wakeman (Cooper T38 (Mk2)) and Lukas Halusa (Maserati 300S). Polesitter Wakeman got the best launch but Halusa set a series of fastest laps to remain close behind. On lap 6 of 10, Albert Otten spun his Kieft Sport at Sainte Devote and hit the inside barrier. This triggered a full course yellow, tightening the field and leading to a three-car shootout for victory between Wakeman, Halusa and Guillermo Fierro-Eleta in another 300S. Fierro-Eleta attempted to pass three-wide for the lead at Mirabeau Haute while the group were negotiating backmarkers. He brushed the wall, ending his challenge for the lead, but went on to finish third. Halusa, in his trademark oversteering driving style, kept the pressure on Wakeman until the final lap when his tyres appeared to go off.

=== Série D ===
In Race D, Jordan Grogor (Matra MS120C) jumped the start to take the lead from third on the grid. Polesitter Stuart Hall (McLaren M19A) re-passed him at Tabac on the opening lap and went on unchallenged to victory. Esteban Gutiérrez, in a BRM P153 once piloted by countryman Pedro Rodríguez, pressured Grogor for second position until Gutiérrez's car became stuck in gear and ground to a halt at the Nouvelle Chicane. This brought out a full-course yellow on lap 7 of 12 while his car was recovered. At the restart, Max Smith-Hilliard pressured Jamie Constable for sixth, and eventually Constable spun at La Rascasse on lap 10. He got going again and only lost two positions. On the final lap, David Shaw, in the Eifelland-March 721, locked his brakes at Tabac and hit the wall. Grogor finished second on the road, but was handed a 10 second penalty which demoted him to third.

=== Série E ===
Entered for Race E was James Davison, an Australian racing driver and veteran of many North American racing series. He piloted the Hill GH1 chassis in which countryman Alan Jones scored his first points in the 1975 German Grand Prix. Davison had an issue at the start of the race, leading to an extra formation lap. The race distance was shortened from 18 laps to 17 laps accordingly. He would rejoin on lap 5 of 17 but was not classified. Roberto Moreno jumped the start and was awarded a 10 second penalty. He spent the entire race pressuring Michael Lyons for third so that he could build enough of a gap to stay ahead of Nick Padmore at the finish. He was unable to do so and was classified fifth behind Padmore. The Shadows of Gregor Fisken and Jean-Denis Delétraz and the Tyrrell of Roald Goethe engaged in a close battle for eighth. On lap 10, Goethe attempted to follow Delétraz as he lapped Piero Lottini at La Rascasse, but Lottini did not see Goethe and the two collided. Stuart Hall enjoyed his second victory of the weekend, challenged all the way to the finish by Marco Werner.

=== Série F ===
Two cars missed qualifying in Race F: Luciano Biamino, who suffered a fuel pressure issue, and Frédéric Lajoux, whose car had been hit at the start of qualifying. Both drivers made the start, and would benefit greatly from a race of attrition. Polesitter Miles Griffiths retired to the pits after the formation lap. This made third-placed qualifier David Shaw (Williams FW06) the first car on the inside. Shaw got a slow launch; fifth-placed qualifier Mark Hazell (Williams FW07B), tried to pass him but the two made contact. Shaw suffered front wing damage and fell to the back of the field, while Hazell recovered to run seventh. Michael Lyons (Hesketh 308E), shot into a lead he would not relinquish. Behind him, there was a three-way contest for third place between Philip Hall (Theodore TR1), Lee Mowle (Lotus 78) and Jamie Constable (Shadow DN8). On lap 8 of 18, the full course yellow was triggered when Hazell came to a halt on the rise to Beau Rivage. Mowle got the jump on Hall after the restart. Hall's challenge later ended after hitting the wall on the exit of Virage Antony Noghès, leaving Constable to continue the close fight for third. However, Constable suffered a car failure at the Nouvelle Chicane on lap 14. A second full course yellow was brought out on lap 16 when Paul Tattersall hit the wall at Mirabeau Haute. This resulted in a one-and-a-half-lap shootout to the flag, allowing last-row starter Lajoux, who had methodically worked his way through the field, to challenge Mowle for an unlikely podium. Mowle resisted Lajoux's challenge and finished third behind Lyons and Michael Cantillon (Tyrrell 010).

=== Série G ===
For 2022, the minimum age limit for cars was lowered by five years to 1985. A new series was added to celebrate three-litre Formula 1 cars from 1981 to 1985. The practice session for Race G was interrupted by a collision between the Tyrrells of British driver Martin Stretton and North American driver Ken Tyrrell. Stretton's car was too badly damaged to feature in qualifying, while Tyrrell went on to qualify tenth and finish sixth.

David Shaw (Arrows A4) struggled to get away on the formation lap; he received a push start but did not make it to his original position of third by the end of the lap. He moved through the grid to recover his spot, but incurred a 10 second penalty for doing so. Frits van Eerd (Williams FW08C) had also failed to get away and did not start the race. Marco Werner (Lotus 87B) and Michael Lyons (Lotus 92) ran first and second, trading fastest laps for the opening phase of the race. Eventually Lyons' challenge faded somewhat and Nick Padmore (Lotus 88B) began to challenge him for second. Behind them, Shaw and Mark Hazell in another FW08C battled for fourth place. On lap 12 of 18, Christophe d'Ansembourg (Williams FW07C) brushed the barriers in the tunnel and damaged his suspension, causing him to retire from the race. He left a large piece of debris on the exit of the Nouvelle Chicane, which Shaw ran over on the next lap. Immediately after, Shaw's car suffered a failure on entry to Tabac and he crashed heavily into the wall. He walked away unscathed. At the restart after the ensuing full course yellow, Jamie Constable (Tyrrell 011) pressured Padmore for third place but endured heartbreak when his car came to a stop within sight of the finish line on the final lap. He ended up classified eighth, the first car a lap down. Alejandro Walter Chahwan (March 811) suffered a retirement shortly after the final restart. Hazell was fifth with two laps to go, but suddenly fell to ninth. He set the fastest lap on the final tour, a small consolation having lost so many places late in the race.

== Results ==
=== Summary ===
Série	Namesake	Cars	Years	Pole position		Fastest lap		Race winner
A1	Louis Chiron	Grand Prix	Pre-war	(United Kingdom) Mark Gillies	2:01.639	(United Kingdom) Mark Gillies	2:00.103	(United Kingdom) Mark Gillies
A2	Juan Manuel Fangio	Formula 1 - front engine	Pre-1961	(Germany) Claudia Hürtgen	1:52.421	(Germany) Claudia Hürtgen	1:53.966	(Germany) Claudia Hürtgen
B	Graham Hill	Formula 1 Formula 2	1961-1965; 1956-1960	(United States) Joe Colasacco	1:47.631	(United Kingdom) Mark Shaw	1:48.908	(United States) Joe Colasacco
C	Vittorio Marzotto	Sports cars - front engine	1952-1957	(United Kingdom) Frederic Wakeman	1:59.966	(United Kingdom) Frederic Wakeman	2:00.286	(United Kingdom) Frederic Wakeman
D	Jackie Stewart	Formula 1	1966-1972	(United Kingdom) Stuart Hall	1:30.096	(United Kingdom) Stuart Hall	1:32.345	(United Kingdom) Stuart Hall
E	Niki Lauda	Formula 1	1973-1976	(United Kingdom) Stuart Hall	1:29.428	(United Kingdom) Stuart Hall	1:30.946	(United Kingdom) Stuart Hall
F	Gilles Villeneuve	Formula 1	1977-1980	(United Kingdom) Miles Griffiths	1:30.653	(United Kingdom) Michael Lyons	1:32.311	(United Kingdom) Michael Lyons
G	Ayrton Senna	Formula 1	1981-1985	(Germany) Marco Werner	1:30.932	(United Kingdom) Mark Hazell	1:33.081	(Germany) Marco Werner

=== Série A1: Pre-war Grand Prix cars and Voiturettes ===
Pos.	No.	Driver	Car	Year	Laps	Time/retired	Grid
1	58	(United Kingdom) Mark Gillies	ERA R3A	1934	10	20:34.478	1
2	66	(Switzerland) Anthony Sinopoli	Maserati 6CM/4CM	1936	10	+1:05.114	3
3	52	(United Kingdom) Patrick Blakeney-Edwards	Frazer Nash Monoplace	1935	10	+1:24.571	12
4	68	(United Kingdom) Ewen Sergison	Maserati 6CM	1936	9	+1 lap	4
5	5	(United States) Charles Nearburg	Alfa Romeo P3	1934	9	+1 lap	8
6	28	(Austria) Martin Halusa	Bugatti 35B	1927	9	+1 lap	6
7	56	(France) Thierry Chanoine	Riley Dobbs	1935	9	+1 lap	5
8	72	(Switzerland) Fritz Burkard	Alfa Romeo 8C Monza	1933	9	+1 lap	20
9	62	(Italy) Luigi Moccia	Maserati 4CM	1937	9	+1 lap	19
10	22	(Germany) Nicola von Dönhoff	Bugatti 51	1932	9	+1 lap	9
11	60	(United Kingdom) Nicholas Topliss	ERA R4A	1935	8	+2 laps	2
12	54	(United States) John Gillett	MG K3 Magnette	1934	8	+2 laps	14
13	70	(Netherlands) Ivo Noteboom	Maserati 6CM	1937	8	+2 laps	15
14	30	(Italy) Maurizio Piantelli	Bugatti 37A	1927	8	+2 laps	13
15	24	(United Kingdom) Julia de Baldanza	Bugatti 35B	1928	8	+2 laps	16
16	76	(Netherlands) Lucas Slijpen	Amilcar C6	1928	8	+2 laps	18
17	26	(France) François Fouquet-Hatevilain	Bugatti 35	1925	4	+6 laps	11
18	32	(Switzerland) Jürg König	Bugatti 37A	1926	3	+7 laps	17
DNS	64	(United Kingdom) Michael Birch	Maserati 4CM	1935			7
DNS	74	(France) Ralf Emmerling	Riley Brooklands	1928			10

=== Série A2: Front-engined Grand Prix cars built before 1961 ===
Pos.	No.	Driver	Car	Year	Laps	Time/retired	Grid
1	20	(Germany) Claudia Hürtgen	Ferrari 246	1960	7	13:33.196	1
2	52	(United Kingdom) Tony Wood	Tec-Mec F415	1959	7	+1.114	2
3	32	(Spain) Guillermo Fierro-Eleta	Maserati 250F	1954	7	+11.779	4
4	48	(United Kingdom) Andrew Haddon	Scarab F1	1960	7	+16.141	6
5	44	(United Kingdom) Max Smith-Hilliard	Lotus 16	1958	7	+18.988	5
6	30	(Austria) Lukas Halusa	Maserati 250F	1954	7	+37.074	8
7	34	(United Kingdom) John Spiers	Maserati 250F	1955	7	+42.148	9
8	46	(United Kingdom) Ewen Sergison	Lotus 16	1959	7	+1:17.701	10
9	10	(United Kingdom) Nick Wigley	Cooper T24	1953	7	+1:23.135	12
10	6	(Belgium) Paul Grant	Cooper T23 (Mk2)	1953	7	+1:39.264	11
11	36	(United States) Jeffrey O'Neill	Maserati 250F	1957	7	+1:49.557	14
12	42	(United Kingdom) Marshall Bailey	Lotus 16	1959	6	+1 lap	13
13	12	(United Kingdom) Michael Birch	Connaught B	1955	6	+1 lap	15
14	8	(United Kingdom) Guy Plante	Cooper T23 (Mk2)	1953	6	+1 lap	17
15	26	(Germany) Klaus Lehr	Talbot-Lago T26C	1948	6	+1 lap	18
16	4	(United Kingdom) Niamh Wood	Cooper T20 (Mk1)	1952	6	+1 lap	21
17	28	(United Kingdom) Julia de Baldanza	Maserati A6GCM	1952	6	+1 lap	20
18	18	(France) Jean-Jacques Bally	Gordini T11/15	1951	6	+1 lap	19
19	16	(France) Eric Leroy	Gordini T11/15	1946	5	+2 laps	22
20	38	(United Kingdom) Marino Franchitti	Maserati 250F	1957	2	+5 laps	7
DSQ	40	(Spain) Joaquín Folch-Rusiñol	Lotus 16	1958			3
DNS	50	(Spain) Jaime Bergel Sainz de Baranda	Maserati 4CLT	1949			16
DNQ	14	(Monaco) Jean-Pierre Richelmi	Gordini T16	1952			23

=== Série B: Rear-engine, 1500, F1 Grand Prix cars from 1961 to 1965 and F2 ===
Pos.	No.	Driver	Car	Year	Laps	Time/retired	Grid
1	4	(United States) Joe Colasacco	Ferrari 1512	1964	10	18:41.899	1
2	25	(United Kingdom) Chris Drake	Cooper T71/T73	1964	10	+31.090	3
3	30	(United Kingdom) Andrew Beaumont	Lotus 24	1962	10	+45.424	5
4	6	(United Kingdom) Dan Collins	Lotus 21	1961	10	+46.000	6
5	8	(United Kingdom) Nick Taylor	Lotus 18	1960	10	+46.616	7
6	40	(Switzerland) Philipp Buhofer	Lotus 24	1962	10	+1:21.373	4
7	32	(United Kingdom) Bernardo Hartogs	Lotus 18/21	1961	10	+1:38.923	10
8	80	(France) Philippe Bonny	Brabham BT2	1963	10	+1:39.419	8
9	2	(Italy) Federico Buratti	Lotus 24	1962	10	+1:40.569	9
10	56	(United Kingdom) John Clark	Cooper T56	1961	10	+1:40.910	11
11	16	(United Kingdom) Sidney Hoole	Cooper T66	1963	10	+1:49.815	14
12	22	(Switzerland) Stephan Jöbstl	Lotus 24	1962	10	+1:50.213	18
13	1	(United States) John Romano	Brabham BT11	1964	10	+1:56.828	12
14	18	(United Kingdom) Clinton McCarthy	Lotus 18	1960	9	+1 lap	15
15	21	(Belgium) Erik Staes	Lotus 18/21	1961	9	+1 lap	17
16	34	(Italy) Andrea Stortoni	Lotus 18	1961	9	+1 lap	24
17	26	(Japan) Katsuaki Kubota	Lotus 18	1960	9	+1 lap	13
18	20	(United Kingdom) Teifion Salisbury	Lotus 18	1961	9	+1 lap	21
19	12	(United Kingdom) Cliff Gray	Cooper T43	1957	9	+1 lap	20
20	52	(Germany) Albert Streminski	Emeryson	1960	9	+1 lap	22
21	58	(Belgium) Tom de Gres	Brabham BT14	1965	9	+1 lap	25
22	44	(United Kingdom) James Timms	Cooper T53	1961	9	+1 lap	23
23	38	(United Kingdom) Mark Shaw	Lotus 21	1961	8	Crash	2
24	54	(Italy) Renato Bicciato	De Tomaso F1	1961	8	+2 laps	27
25	36	(United States) Bradley Hoyt	Lotus 18	1960	8	+2 laps	16
26	10	(United Kingdom) Costas Michael	Cooper T73	1964	5	+5 laps	19
27	48	(United Kingdom) Robert Pulleyn	Lotus 18	1960	4	+6 laps	26
PO	14	(United Kingdom) Richard Wilson	Cooper T60	1962			
PO	28	(France) "Mister John of B"	Lola Mk4	1962			
PO	46	(United States) Kurt DelBene	BRP-BRM	1964			
DNA	50	(United Kingdom) James Hagan	Lotus 18	1961			

=== Série C: Front-engine Sport Racing cars from 1952 to 1957 ===
Pos.	No.	Driver	Car	Year	Laps	Time/retired	Grid
1	72	(United Kingdom) Frederic Wakeman	Cooper T38 (Mk2)	1955	10	20:38.719	1
2	88	(Austria) Lukas Halusa	Maserati 300S	1955	10	+1.467	2
3	80	(Spain) Guillermo Fierro-Eleta	Maserati 300S	1957	10	+6.542	3
4	62	(Austria) Niklas Halusa	Jaguar D-Type	1954	10	+8.909	4
5	84	(Germany) Claudia Hürtgen	Maserati 300S	1955	10	+25.578	5
6	78	(United Kingdom) Richard Wilson	Maserati 250S	1957	10	+26.287	6
7	66	(United Kingdom) Martin Hunt	HWM-Jaguar Sport	1954	10	+40.208	7
8	76	(Argentina) Mathias Sielecki	Aston Martin DB3S	1955	10	+1:07.105	8
9	56	(United Kingdom) Nicolas Bert	Jaguar C-Type	1952	10	+1:08.260	11
10	60	(United Kingdom) Nigel Webb	Jaguar C-Type	1952	10	+1:23.075	12
11	28	(United Kingdom) John Ure	Frazer Nash Le Mans Replica (Mk2)	1952	10	+1:30.761	9
12	82	(Switzerland) Conrad Ulrich	Maserati 300S	1955	10	+1:31.290	10
13	20	(Germany) Dominik Roschmann	Maserati A6GCS	1955	10	+2:00.602	15
14	68	(Germany) Katarina Kyvalova	Cooper T33 (Mk1)	1954	10	+2:01.516	13
15	18	(Argentina) Manuel Eliçabe	Maserati A6GCS	1955	10	+2:02.760	14
16	54	(United States) Tazio Ottis	Ferrari 750 Monza	1955	10	+2:07.458	19
17	16	(Germany) Ulrich Schumacher	Maserati A6GCS	1954	9	+1 lap	16
18	74	(Germany) Wolfgang Friedrichs	Aston Martin DB3S	1954	9	+1 lap	17
19	58	(United States) Jeffrey O'Neill	Jaguar C-Type	1953	9	+1 lap	22
20	8	(United Kingdom) Malcolm Paul	Lotus 10	1955	9	+1 lap	20
21	14	(Argentina) Adrian Sucari	Maserati A6GCS	1954	9	+1 lap	21
22	70	(Argentina) Carlos Miguens	Cooper T38 (Mk2)	1955	9	+1 lap	18
23	52	(United Kingdom) David Franklin	Ferrari 225 S	1952	9	+1 lap	23
24	24	(Germany) Lutz Rathenow	Veritas RS2000	1948	9	+1 lap	24
25	32	(United Kingdom) Paul Griffin	Connaught ALSR	1954	9	+1 lap	26
26	30	(France) Pierre Macchi	Frazer Nash Le Mans Coupe	1953	9	+1 lap	28
27	26	(United States) John Breslow	Frazer Nash Le Mans Replica (Mk2)	1952	9	+1 lap	27
28	50	(United Kingdom) Bryn Tootell	Connaught L2	1949	8	+2 laps	29
29	6	(Germany) Albert Otten	Kieft Sport	1954	5	+5 laps	25
DNS	86	(Netherlands) David Hart	Maserati 300S	1956			
PO	22	(Argentina) Carlos Sielecki	Maserati A6GCS	1954			
DNA	10	(United Kingdom) Max Smith-Hilliard	Lotus 10	1955			
DNA	12	(France) Jean-Jacques Bally	Ferrari 500 Mondial	1954			
DNA	64	(United Kingdom) Gregor Fisken	HWM-Jaguar	1955			

=== Série D: F1 Grand Prix cars 3L from 1966 to 1972 ===
Pos.	No.	Driver	Car	Year	Laps	Time/retired	Grid
1	15	(United Kingdom) Stuart Hall	McLaren M19A	1971	12	19:38.832	1
2	25	(United Kingdom) Michael Lyons	Surtees TS9	1971	12	+14.705	4
3	16	(South Africa) Jordan Grogor	Matra MS120C	1971	12	+22.267	2
4	5	(United Kingdom) Matthew Wrigley	March 721G	1972	12	+27.697	7
5	12	(United Kingdom) Max Smith-Hilliard	Surtees TS9B	1971	12	+53.006	6
6	3	(Monaco) Franco Meiners	Ferrari 312B3	1972	12	+1:28.570	10
7	10	(Monaco) Roald Goethe	McLaren M14A	1970	12	+1:34.783	9
8	9	(United Kingdom) Jamie Constable	Brabham BT37	1972	11	+1 lap	8
9	4	(Austria) Jürgen Boden	Ferrari 312B2	1971	11	+1 lap	11
10	21	(Monaco) Nicolas Matile	Matra MS120B	1971	11	+1 lap	15
11	27	(United Kingdom) David Shaw	March 721	1972	10	+2 laps	5
12	24	(Belgium) Paul Grant	De Tomaso F1-70	1972	10	+2 laps	16
13	19	(Mexico) Esteban Gutiérrez	BRM P153	1970	5	+7 laps	3
14	26	(United Kingdom) Christopher Perkins	Surtees TS14A	1972	3	+9 laps	18
15	20	(France) "Mister John of B"	Matra MS120C	1972	2	+10 laps	12
DNS	28	(Germany) Harald Becker	March 701	1970			13
DNS	11	(Germany) Claudia Hürtgen	Ferrari 312	1969			14
DNS	2	(Japan) Katsuaki Kubota	Lotus 72	1971			17
DNA	8	(France) Jean-François Decaux	Ferrari 312	1967			

=== Série E: F1 Grand Prix cars 3L from 1973 to 1976 ===
Pos.	No.	Driver	Car	Year	Laps	Time/retired	Grid
1	8	(United Kingdom) Stuart Hall	McLaren M23	1973	17	26:14.912	1
2	31	(Germany) Marco Werner	Lotus 76	1974	17	+1.539	3
3	7	(United Kingdom) Michael Lyons	McLaren M26	1977	17	+20.585	4
4	6	(United Kingdom) Nick Padmore	Lotus 77	1976	17	+22.143	5
5	22	(Brazil) Roberto Moreno	Lola T370	1974	17	+30.907	2
6	27	(United Kingdom) Matthew Wrigley	Penske PC3	1975	17	+1:09.063	6
7	17	(United Kingdom) Gregor Fisken	Shadow DN5	1975	17	+1:22.515	10
8	16	(United Kingdom) Max Smith-Hilliard	Shadow DN5B	1975	17	+1:31.325	8
9	15	(Switzerland) Jean-Denis Delétraz	Shadow DN3	1974	17	+1:34.219	9
10	5	(United States) Kevin Weeda	Lotus 77	1975	16	+1 lap	11
11	2	(Austria) Niklas Halusa	McLaren M23	1976	16	+1 lap	13
12	37	(France) Guillaume Roman	Ensign N175	1975	16	+1 lap	18
13	14	(Switzerland) Toni Seiler	Shadow DN1	1973	16	+1 lap	15
14	18	(Belgium) Marc Devis	Surtees TS16	1974	16	+1 lap	16
15	1	(Greece) John Inglessis	Lotus 72E	1974	16	+1 lap	21
16	28	(United States) Douglas Mockett	Penske PC4	1976	15	+2 laps	23
17	23	(France) Philippe Bonny	Trojan T103	1974	15	+2 laps	20
18	9	(United States) Christopher Locke	Lotus 77	1976	13	+4 laps	22
19	4	(Monaco) Roald Goethe	Tyrrell 007	1974	8	+9 laps	12
20	33	(Italy) Piero Lottini	Surtees TS19	1976	7	+10 laps	19
21	24	(United Kingdom) James Hagan	Hesketh 308	1974	4	+13 laps	17
22	25	(Italy) Emanuele Pirro	Shadow DN1	1973	2	+15 laps	14
DNS	21	(Australia) James Davison	Hill GH1	1975			7
PO	11	(France) "Mister John of B"	Ferrari 312T	1975			
PO	12	(Germany) Claudia Hürtgen	Ferrari 312B3	1974			
DNA	26	(United Kingdom) Mike Wrigley	Penske PC3	1975			

=== Série F: F1 Grand Prix cars 3L from 1977 to 1980 ===
Pos.	No.	Driver	Car	Year	Laps	Time/retired	Grid
1	1	(United Kingdom) Michael Lyons	Hesketh 308E	1977	18	30:49.063	2
2	4	(United Kingdom) Michael Cantillon	Tyrrell 010	1982	18	+7.642	4
3	6	(United Kingdom) Lee Mowle	Lotus 78	1977	18	+1:03.148	6
4	29	(Monaco) Frédéric Lajoux	Arrows A1B	1978	18	+1:04.283	17
5	12	(United Kingdom) Steve Brooks	Lotus 81	1980	18	+1:05.010	16
6	21	(Netherlands) Frits van Eerd	Fittipaldi F7	1980	18	+1:24.508	9
7	9	(Monaco) Nicolas Matile	March 771	1977	18	+2:01.593	11
8	16	(United Kingdom) Ewen Sergison	Shadow DN9	1978	17	+1 lap	13
9	30	(Germany) Harald Becker	Arrows A3	1980	17	+1 lap	14
10	23	(Italy) Luciano Biamino	Ensign N180	1980	15	+3 laps	18
11	22	(United Kingdom) Paul Tattersall	Ensign N179	1979	13	+5 laps	12
12	17	(United Kingdom) Jamie Constable	Shadow DN8	1977	12	+6 laps	7
13	28	(United Kingdom) David Shaw	Williams FW06	1979	11	+7 laps	3
14	32	(United Kingdom) Philip Hall	Theodore TR1	1978	10	+8 laps	8
15	18	(United Kingdom) Richard Hope	Shadow DN11	1980	9	+9 laps	15
16	27	(United Kingdom) Mark Hazell	Williams FW07B	1980	6	+12 laps	5
17	31	(United Kingdom) Ronald Maydon	LEC CRP1	1977	2	+16 laps	10
DNS	15	(United Kingdom) Miles Griffiths	Fittipaldi F5A	1977			1

=== Série G: F1 Grand Prix cars 3L from 1981 to 1985 ===
Pos.	No.	Driver	Car	Year	Laps	Time/retired	Grid
1	9	(Germany) Marco Werner	Lotus 87B	1982	18	29:46.832	1
2	16	(United Kingdom) Michael Lyons	Lotus 92	1983	18	+6.166	2
3	7	(United Kingdom) Nick Padmore	Lotus 88B	1981	18	+18.783	4
4	23	(Germany) Frank Stippler	Alfa Romeo 182	1982	18	+38.208	9
5	12	(Japan) Katsuaki Kubota	Lotus 91	1982	18	+46.062	8
6	3	(United States) Ken Tyrrell	Tyrrell 011	1982	18	+46.772	10
7	10	(United States) Jonathan Holtzman	Lotus 87B	1981	18	+1:32.312	14
8	4	(United Kingdom) Jamie Constable	Tyrrell 011	1983	17	+1 lap	7
9	20	(United Kingdom) Mark Hazell	Williams FW08C	1983	17	+1 lap	5
10	17	(United Kingdom) Steve Hartley	Arrows A6	1983	17	+1 lap	13
11	2	(United Kingdom) Ian Simmonds	Tyrrell 012	1983	17	+1 lap	17
12	22	(United Kingdom) Richard Hope	Alfa Romeo 182	1982	17	+1 lap	16
13	8	(United Kingdom) Mark Higson	McLaren MP4	1982	16	+2 laps	15
14	28	(United Kingdom) Neil Glover	Arrows A5	1981	16	+2 laps	18
15	18	(Argentina) Alejandro Walter Chahwan	March 811	1981	13	+5 laps	19
16	11	(United Kingdom) Dan Collins	Lotus 91	1982	13	+5 laps	12
17	29	(United Kingdom) David Shaw	Arrows A4	1982	12	+6 laps	3
18	1	(Belgium) Christophe d'Ansembourg	Williams FW07C	1981	11	+7 laps	6
DNS	21	(Netherlands) Frits van Eerd	Williams FW08C	1983			11
PO	5	(United Kingdom) Martin Stretton	Tyrrell 012	1984			
