= Lotus 91 =

Formula One motor racing car

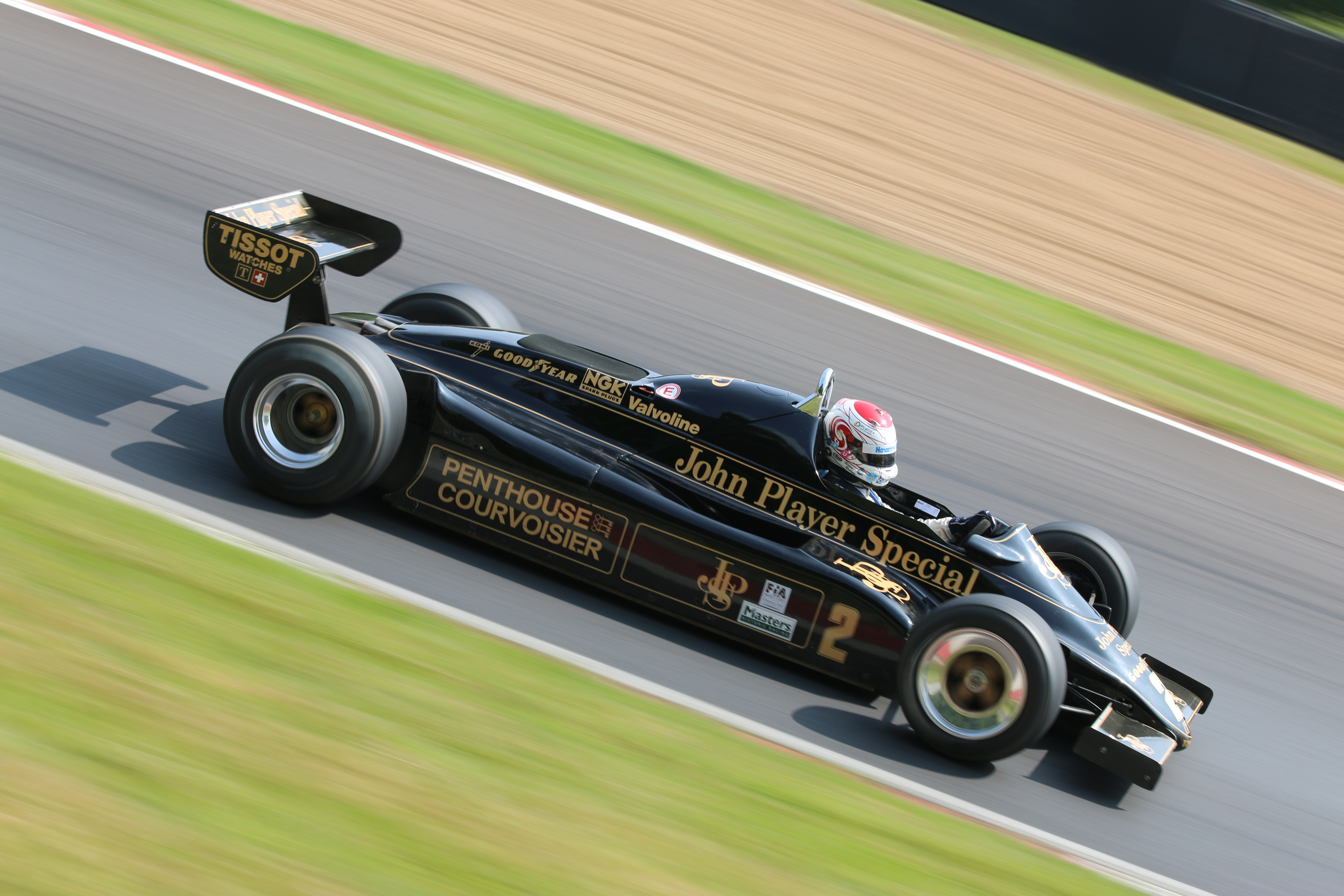
- Category: Formula One
- Constructor: Lotus
- Designers: Colin Chapman (Technical Director); Martin Ogilvie (Chief Designer); John Davis (Head of Aerodynamics and R&D)
- Predecessor: 87B
- Successor: 92

Technical specifications
- Chassis: Carbon fibre and Kevlar monocoque
- Engine: Cosworth DFV, 2,993 cc (182.6 cu in), 90° V8, NA, mid-engine, longitudinally-mounted
- Transmission: Lotus / Hewland 5-speed manual
- Power: 480 hp (357.9 kW) @ 11,000 rpm
- Fuel: Valvoline
- Tyres: Pirelli; Goodyear

Competition history
- Notable entrants: John Player Team Lotus
- Notable drivers: 11. (Italy) Elio de Angelis; 12. (United Kingdom) Nigel Mansell; 12. (Brazil) Roberto Moreno; 12. (United Kingdom) Geoff Lees
- Debut: 1982 Brazilian Grand Prix
Races	Wins	Podiums	Poles	F/Laps
15	1	2	0	0
- Constructors' Championships: 0
- Drivers' Championships: 0

The Lotus 91 was a car used by the English team Lotus in the 1982 Formula One season, designed by Colin Chapman, Martin Ogilvie and Tony Rudd.

== Design ==
After several uncompetitive seasons with experimental or uncompetitive cars, Colin Chapman went back to basics and designed the Lotus 91, based in part on the Williams FW07 and Lotus' own 88 design. Powered by the Ford Cosworth DFV and using a standard Hewland gearbox, the 91 was uncomplicated and easy to maintain. Following Brabham's lead, the new car was the first Lotus chassis to use carbon brakes, improving braking performance considerably.

After a design study by Chapman into new composite materials, the decision was taken to build the car in carbon fibre and Kevlar, making it, after the McLaren MP4/1 and Lotus 87, the third F1 car to race to be built from the material - the Lotus 88 not having raced before it was banned.

Under the direction of Peter Warr, the team worked hard to make the car as competitive as possible. The lightweight chassis gave the 91 a fighting chance against the far more powerful turbo engined cars and Cosworth worked on a short stroke version of the DFV purely for Lotus' use. The sidepods were full length units, extending to the very back of the car to take full advantage of the ground effect aerodynamics. However the 91 was quite pitch sensitive, making it tricky to drive. The Lotus 91 was the basis for the Lotus 92 - which pioneered active suspension in Formula 1. This suspension was revolutionary, using an on-board system to control the ride height and behaviour of the suspension, thus the Lotus 92 was the first car to be fitted with active suspension. The system was partially controlled by computers but at this early stage was mostly operated by hydro-pneumatic valves.

== Racing history ==
Elio de Angelis used the car well but found the 91 was mostly competitive on ultra fast tracks like Hockenheim, Monza and the Österreichring. The latter track provided a thrilling final lap win for de Angelis against Keke Rosberg in the Williams. That win, as well as several other consistent results by de Angelis and a podium place by Mansell, helped the team to fifth in the final standings in 1982, before ground effects were banned for the 1983 Formula One season and the 91 was replaced by the first Lotus turbo car.

The 91 was the last Lotus F1 car to win a race under Colin Chapman's rule before he died of a heart attack on 16 December 1982.

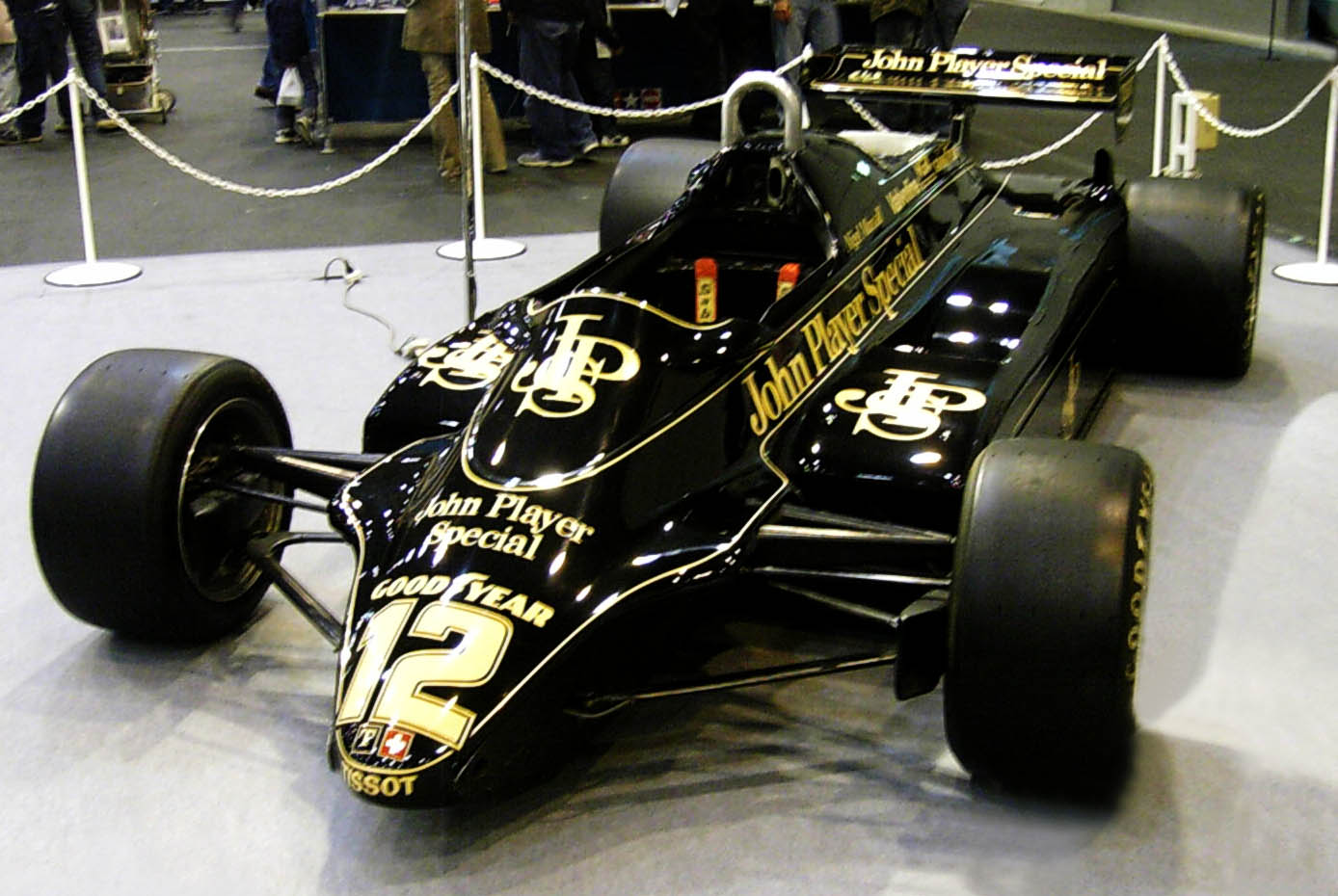
The Lotus 91 without front wing

== Complete Formula One results ==
(key)

Year	Team	Engine	Tyres	Drivers	1	2	3	4	5	6	7	8	9	10	11	12	13	14	15	16	Pts.	WCC
1982	John Player Team Lotus	Cosworth DFV; V8 NA	G		RSA	BRA	USW	SMR	BEL	MON	DET	CAN	NED	GBR	FRA	GER	AUT	SUI	ITA	CPL	30	5th
1982	John Player Team Lotus	Cosworth DFV; V8 NA	G	Nigel Mansell		3	7		Ret	4	Ret	Ret		Ret		9	Ret	8	7	Ret	30	5th
1982	John Player Team Lotus	Cosworth DFV; V8 NA	G	Elio de Angelis		Ret	5		4	5	Ret	4	Ret	4	Ret	Ret	1	6	Ret	Ret	30	5th
1982	John Player Team Lotus	Cosworth DFV; V8 NA	G	Roberto Moreno									DNQ								30	5th
1982	John Player Team Lotus	Cosworth DFV; V8 NA	G	Geoff Lees											12						30	5th
