= Lotus 87 =

Formula One racing car

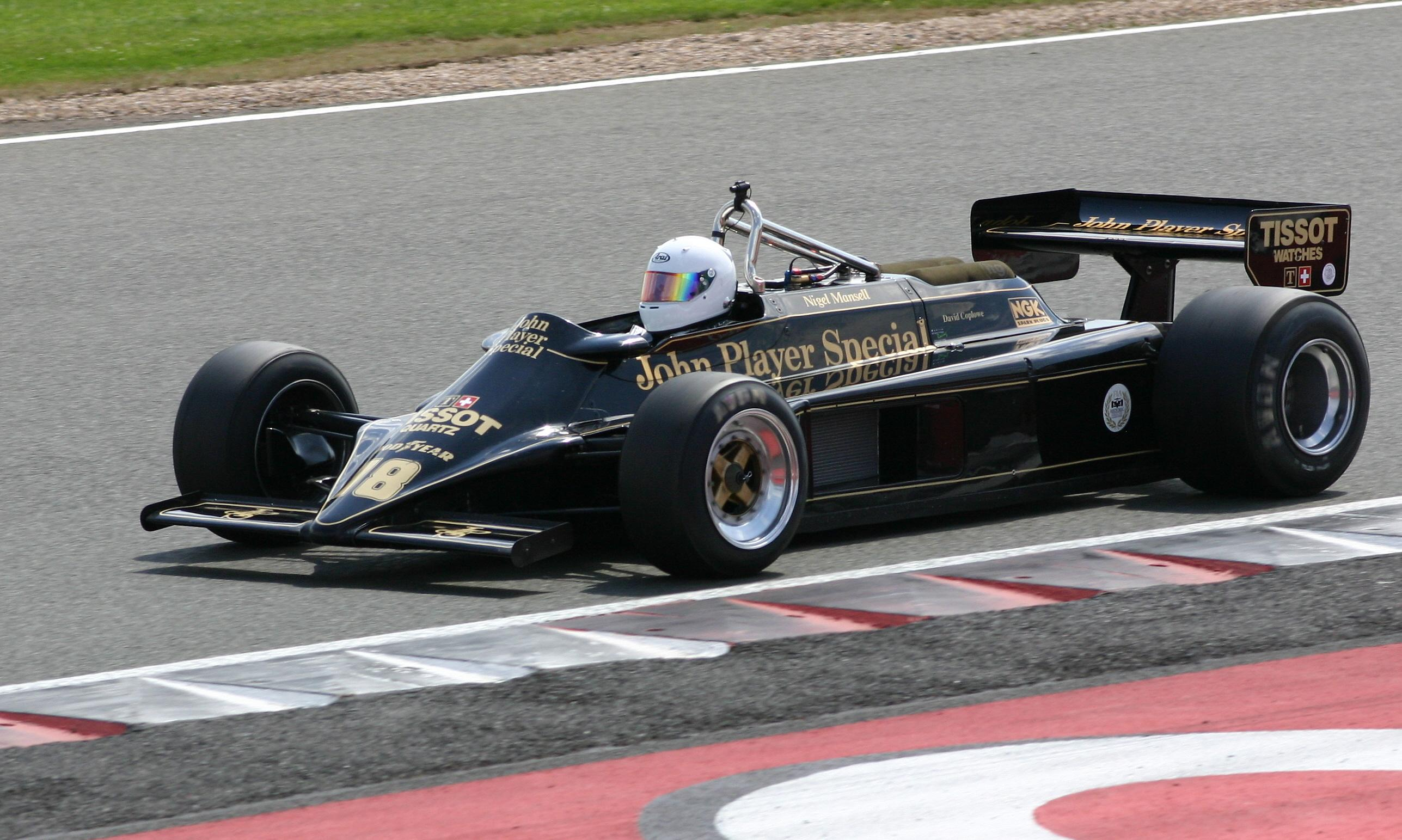
- Category: Formula One
- Constructor: Lotus
- Designers: Colin Chapman (Technical Director); Martin Ogilvie (Chief Designer); Peter Wright (Head of Aerodynamics)
- Predecessor: 81 / 86
- Successor: 88 / 91

Technical specifications
- Chassis: Carbon fibre and kevlar monocoque
- Axle track: 1,778 mm (70.0 in) front, 1,600 mm (63 in) rear
- Wheelbase: 2,705 mm (106.5 in)
- Engine: Ford Cosworth DFV, 2,998 cc (183 cu in), V8, NA, mid-mounted
- Transmission: Hewland FGA 400 5-speed manual gearbox
- Weight: 587 kg (1,294 lb)
- Fuel: Essex (1981); Valvoline (1982)
- Tyres: Michelin (1981); Goodyear (1981-1982)

Competition history
- Notable entrants: Team Essex Lotus; John Player Team Lotus
- Notable drivers: (Italy) Elio de Angelis (United Kingdom) Nigel Mansell
- Debut: 1981 Monaco Grand Prix
Races	Wins	Podiums	Poles	F/Laps
11	0	0	0	0

The Lotus 87 was a Formula One racing car used by Team Lotus in the second part of the 1981 Formula One season and in the first race of the 1982 season.

== Design and development ==
The car, driven by Italian Elio de Angelis and future world champion Nigel Mansell, was another step in Lotus' development of ground effect cars. Its predecessor, the Lotus 81 had proven to suffer from a chassis that was not rigid enough, compared to the dominant Williams FW07. Lotus therefore introduced a new chassis, built out of carbon fibre and reinforced by kevlar sheets, since the team felt carbon fibre alone would not be sufficient to provide the chassis with the stability needed. As the John Barnard-designed McLaren MP4/1 would prove, this was a miscalculation.

The chassis was originally planned for the ambitious twin-chassis Lotus 88, but after the car was outlawed, it was hastily rebuilt to become the more conservative 87.

== Racing history ==
The car was not competitive enough to fight for victories, even though the drivers did manage to get some points.

When the new turbo charged engines of Renault and Ferrari became more reliable, the car proved to be yet still too heavy and was replaced by a lighter 87B specification for the opening round of 1982. It was subsequently replaced altogether by the Lotus 91, which proved more competitive, recording a podium in its first outing in Brazil.

== Formula One World Championship results ==
(key)

Year	Entrant	Chassis	Engine	Tyres	Drivers	1	2	3	4	5	6	7	8	9	10	11	12	13	14	15	16	Points	WCC
1981	Team Essex Lotus; John Player Team Lotus	87	Cosworth DFV; V8 NA	MI; G		USW	BRA	ARG	SMR	BEL	MON	ESP	FRA	GBR	GER	AUT	NED	ITA	CAN	CPL		22*	7th
1981	Team Essex Lotus; John Player Team Lotus	87	Cosworth DFV; V8 NA	MI; G	Nigel Mansell						Ret	6	7	DNQ	Ret	Ret	Ret	Ret	Ret	4		22*	7th
1981	Team Essex Lotus; John Player Team Lotus	87	Cosworth DFV; V8 NA	MI; G	Elio de Angelis						Ret	5	6	DSQ	7	7	5	4	6	Ret		22*	7th
1982	John Player Team Lotus	87B	Cosworth DFV; V8 NA	G		RSA	BRA	USW	SMR	BEL	MON	DET	CAN	NED	GBR	FRA	GER	AUT	SUI	ITA	CPL	30**	5th
1982	John Player Team Lotus	87B	Cosworth DFV; V8 NA	G	Nigel Mansell	Ret																30**	5th
1982	John Player Team Lotus	87B	Cosworth DFV; V8 NA	G	Elio de Angelis	8																30**	5th

* Of these, 13 points were scored with the 87. During the season Lotus switched from Michelin to Goodyear tyres.
** No points scored with the 87B.
