= Lotus 81 =

Formula One racing car

Lotus 81 Lotus 81B
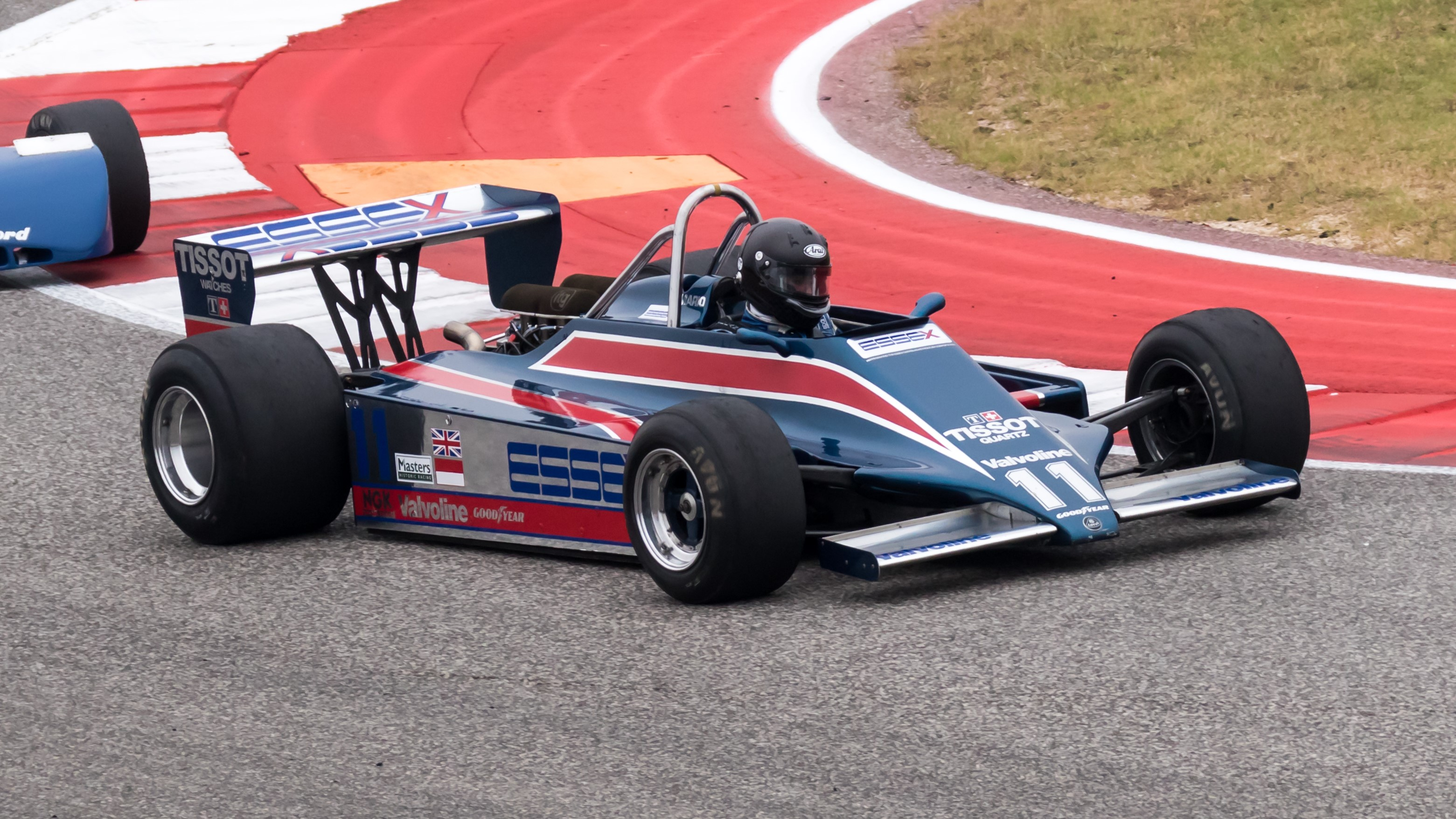
- Lotus 81 during the 2017 FIA Masters Historic Formula One Championship at the Circuit of the Americas
- Category: Formula One
- Constructor: Lotus
- Designers: Colin Chapman (Technical Director); Martin Ogilvie (Chief Designer); Peter Wright (Head of Aerodynamics)
- Predecessor: 80
- Successor: 86 / 87 / 88

Technical specifications
- Chassis: Aluminium monocoque
- Suspension (front): Double wishbones, coil springs over dampers, anti-roll bar
- Suspension (rear): Double wishbones, coil springs over dampers, anti-roll bar
- Length: 4,623 mm (182.0 in)
- Width: 2,134 mm (84.0 in)
- Height: 965 mm (38.0 in)
- Axle track: Front: 1,700 mm (67 in); Rear: 1,638 mm (64.5 in)
- Wheelbase: 2,789 mm (109.8 in)
- Engine: Ford Cosworth DFV, 2,993 cc (182.6 cu in), 90° V8, NA, mid-engine, longitudinally mounted
- Transmission: Hewland FGA 400 5-speed manual
- Weight: 580 kg (1,280 lb)
- Fuel: Essex
- Tyres: Goodyear (1980); Michelin (1981)

Competition history
- Notable entrants: Team Essex Lotus
- Notable drivers: 11. (United States) Mario Andretti; 12. (Italy) Elio de Angelis; 12./11. (United Kingdom) Nigel Mansell
- Debut: 1980 Argentine Grand Prix
- Last event: 1981 Belgian Grand Prix
Races	Wins	Podiums	Poles	F/Laps
18	0	2	0	0
- Constructors' Championships: 0
- Drivers' Championships: 0
- Unless otherwise stated, all data refer to Formula One World Championship Grands Prix only.

The Lotus 81 was a Formula One racing car built by Colin Chapman's Lotus team for the 1980 Formula One season. Unlike many of forebears the 81 was not a terribly innovative or competitive car, coming as it did at a time when Chapman's interest in his racing activities was waning.

Instead it was a very standard ground effect design with sliding skirts and the ubiquitous Cosworth DFV 3.0 litre V8 powerplant. The car was said to generate a great deal of downforce but have excessive pitch sensitivity problems, ultimately leading Chapman to develop the innovative twin-chassis Lotus 88.

Mario Andretti and Elio de Angelis used the 81 in all 14 rounds of the 1980 Formula One world championship, and the car also gave Nigel Mansell his Formula One debut, with the British driver lining up in a total of three races that season. The best result for the car was Elio de Angelis's 2nd place in Brazil.

Chapman had intended to use the Lotus 88 for the 1981 season, but a massive furore over the legality of the new car meant that the 81 was kept on as a stop gap for the first four races Lotus competed in, as they boycotted the 1981 San Marino Grand Prix, with Mansell taking 3rd place in the Belgian Grand Prix and de Angelis claiming three points finishes. The car was replaced by the Lotus 87.

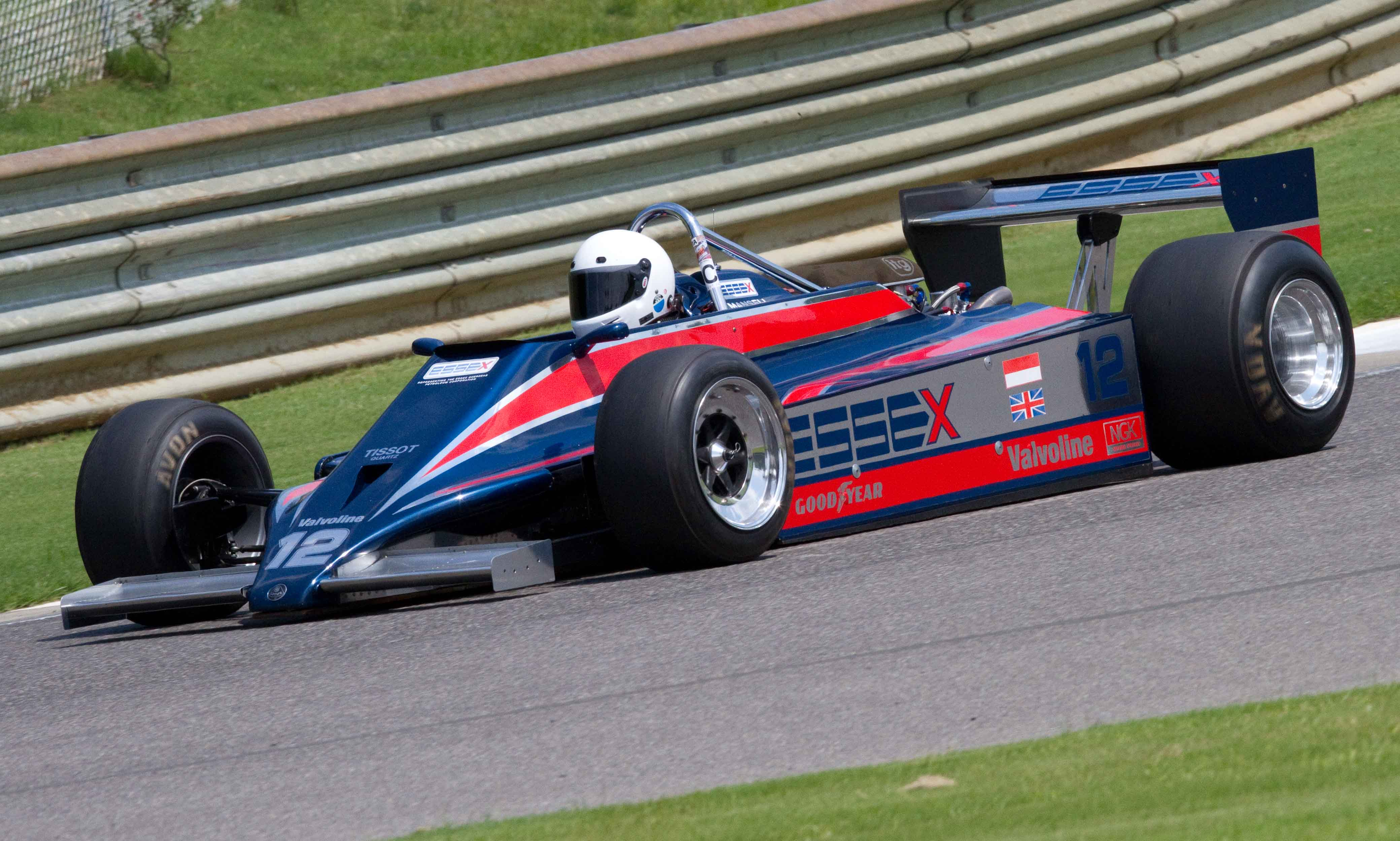
The Lotus 81 at Barber.

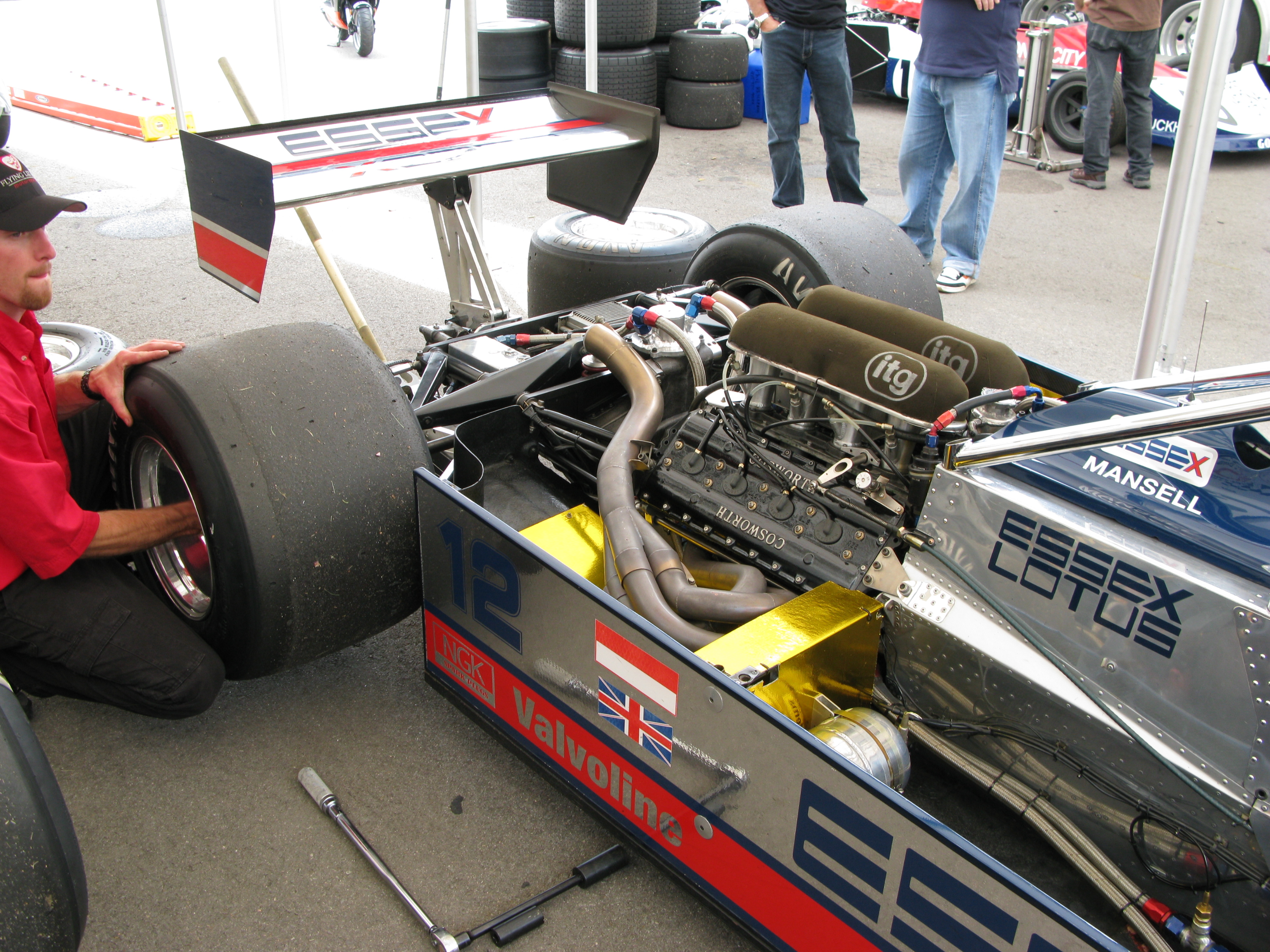
Lotus 81 engine and transmission

== Complete Formula One results ==
(key)

Year	Entrant	Chassis	Engine	Tyres	Drivers	1	2	3	4	5	6	7	8	9	10	11	12	13	14	15	Points	WCC
1980	Team Essex Lotus	81	Ford Cosworth DFV	G		ARG	BRA	RSA	USW	BEL	MON	FRA	GBR	GER	AUT	NED	ITA	CAN	USA		14	5th
1980	Team Essex Lotus	81	Ford Cosworth DFV	G	Mario Andretti	Ret	Ret	12	Ret	Ret	7	Ret	Ret	7	Ret	8	Ret	Ret	6		14	5th
1980	Team Essex Lotus	81	Ford Cosworth DFV	G	Elio de Angelis	Ret	2	Ret	Ret	10	9	Ret	Ret	16	6	Ret	4	10	4		14	5th
1980	Team Essex Lotus	81B	Ford Cosworth DFV	G	Nigel Mansell										Ret	Ret	DNQ				14	5th
1981	Team Essex Lotus	81B	Ford Cosworth DFV	MI		USW	BRA	ARG	SMR	BEL	MON	ESP	FRA	GBR	GER	AUT	NED	ITA	CAN	CPL	22*	7th
1981	Team Essex Lotus	81B	Ford Cosworth DFV	MI	Nigel Mansell	Ret	11	Ret		3											22*	7th
1981	Team Essex Lotus	81B	Ford Cosworth DFV	MI	Elio de Angelis	Ret	5	6		5											22*	7th

* Of those, 9 points were scored with the 81 model.
