= Lotus 88 =

Formula One motor racing car

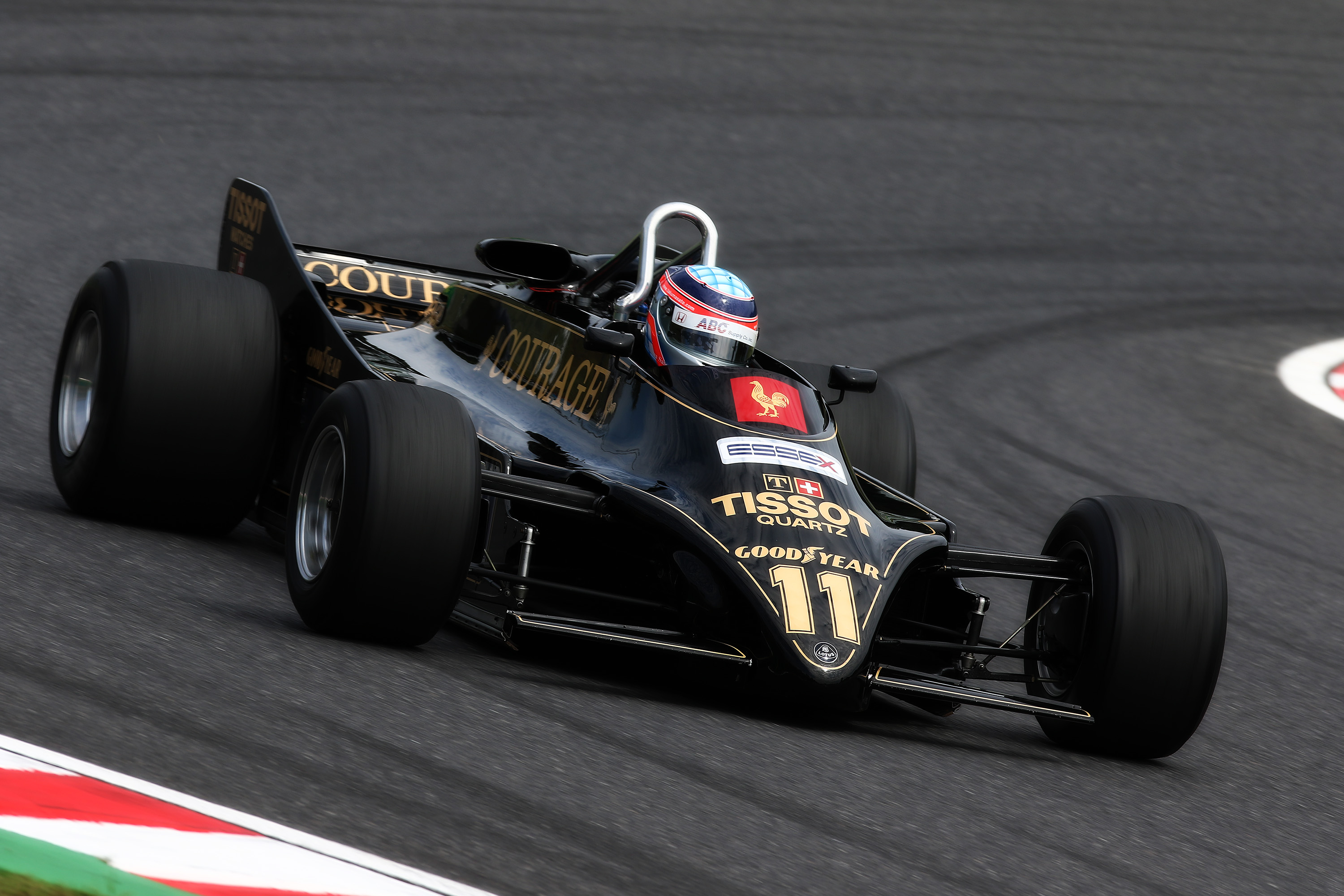
- A Lotus 88 driven by Takuma Sato in 2015
- Category: Formula One
- Constructor: Team Lotus
- Designers: Colin Chapman; Martin Ogilvie
- Predecessor: 81 / 87
- Successor: 91

Technical specifications
- Chassis: Twin-chassis construction
- Suspension (front): Top rocker arms, lower wishbones, inboard springs
- Suspension (rear): As front
- Axle track: Front: 1,778 mm (70.0 in); Rear: 1,600 mm (63 in)
- Wheelbase: 2,178 mm (85.7 in)
- Engine: Cosworth DFV 2,993 cc (2.993 L; 182.6 cu in) V8
- Transmission: Lotus/Hewland 5-speed manual
- Weight: 585 kg (1,290 lb)
- Tyres: Michelin/Goodyear

Competition history
- Notable entrants: Team Essex Lotus
- Notable drivers: 11. (Italy) Elio de Angelis; 12. (United Kingdom) Nigel Mansell
- Debut: 1981 United States Grand Prix West
Races	Wins	Poles	F/Laps
0	0	0	0

The Lotus 88 is an innovative Formula One car designed by Colin Chapman, Peter Wright, Tony Rudd and Martin Ogilvie of Lotus in an effort to maximise the downforce produced by ground effect. The Lotus 88 made its debut at the first practice session of the 1981 season opener, the US Grand Prix West at Long Beach, but was ultimately not allowed to race. It still was the first Formula One car to use a carbon fibre monocoque chassis to debut at a Grand Prix event. The carbon fibre McLaren MP4 made its first appearance at the third Grand Prix of the season in Argentina.

== Design ==
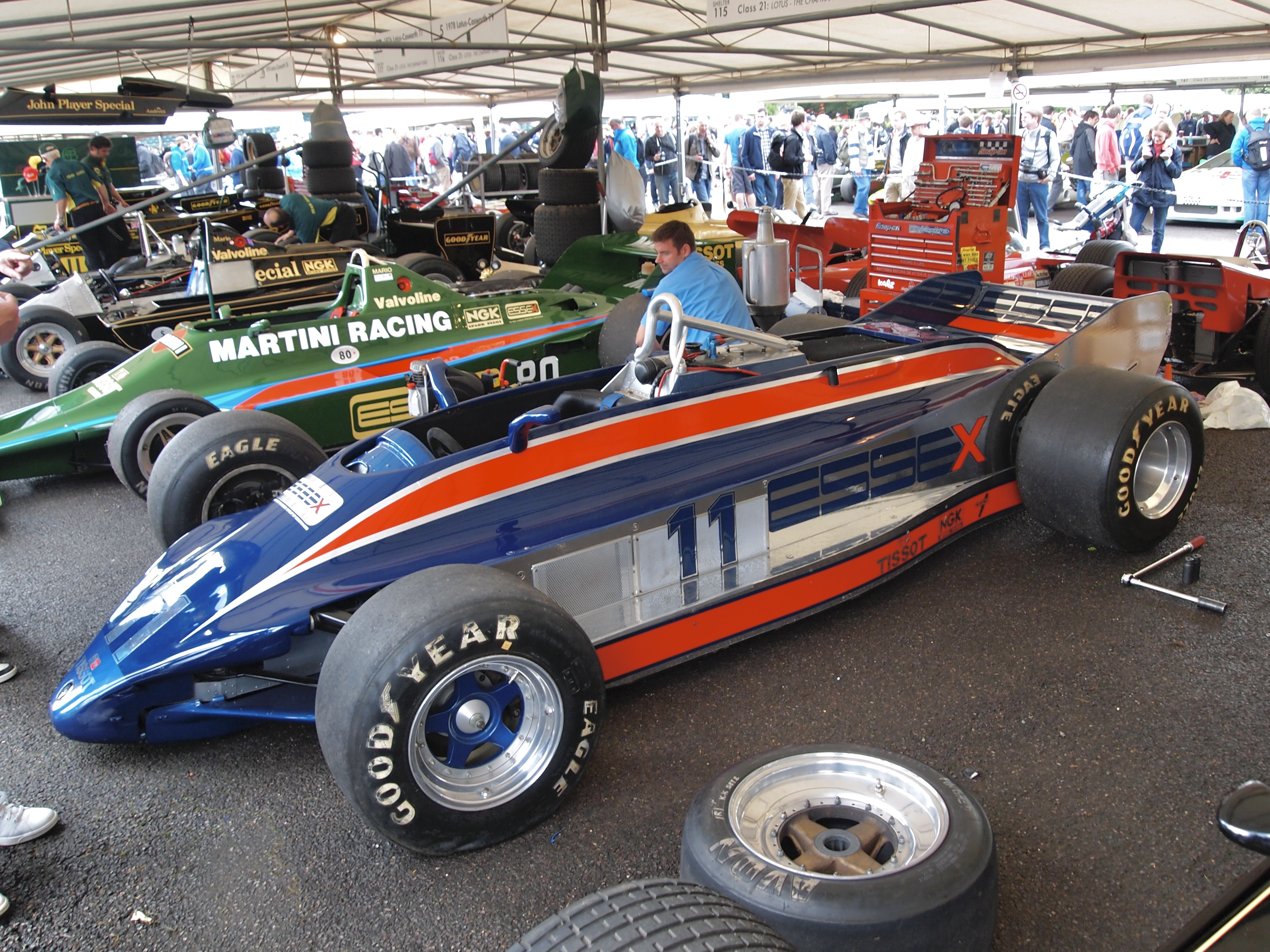
Lotus 86, Goodwood Festival of Speed 2012

By 1981 the ground effect cars were so efficient and so fast that the drivers were suffering from the tremendous g-forces involved in cornering and braking. The FIA banned the moveable skirts fitted to the bottom of the cars' sidepods that were vital for achieving consistent ground effect and regulated a mandatory ground clearance of 6 cm, in the interests of driver safety.

Brabham were the first to circumvent the rules by using hydropneumatic suspension which compressed under aerodynamic loading and lowered the Brabham BT49 onto the track surface. This had the side effect of rendering the car without any sort of suspension, causing the driver to be buffeted even more than before. However, the performance gains were such that other teams were soon following suit - although most had difficulty in replicating the Brabham system and used a simple switch to lower the car. Chapman had other ideas.

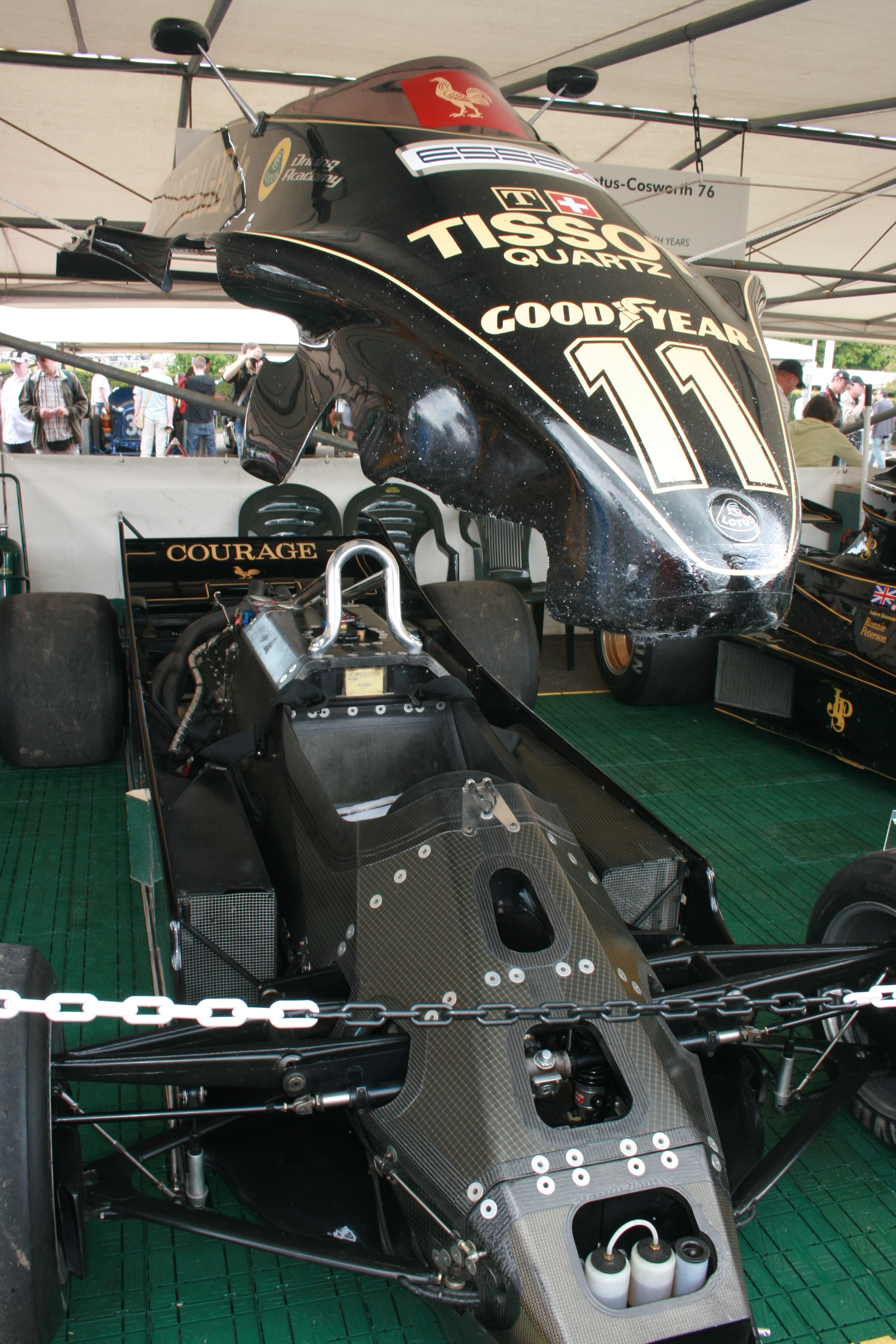
The twin chassis internal structure of the Lotus 88

The earlier Lotus 86 had been designed at the time when skirts were still legal, in the same layout as the 88 but only one prototype had been built. The performance gains were relatively small but significant over conventional ground effects cars. When the skirts were banned, Wright studied the car and its performance without skirts. The loss in performance was largely negligible, so the 88 was quickly designed as a re-engineered 86.

The 88 used an ingenious system of having a twin chassis, one inside the other. The inner chassis would hold the cockpit and would be independently sprung from the outer one, which was designed to take the pressures of the ground effects. The outer chassis did not have discernible wings, and was in effect one huge ground effect system, beginning just behind the nose of the car and extending all the way inside the rear wheels, thereby producing massive amounts of downforce.

The car was powered by the Ford Cosworth DFV engine. Lotus drivers Nigel Mansell and Elio de Angelis reported the car was pleasing to drive and responsive. To make the aerodynamic loads as manageable as possible, the car was constructed extensively in carbon fibre, making it the first Formula One car to use the material in large quantity, followed very shortly after by the McLaren MP4 .

Other teams were outraged at this exploitation of the regulations and protests were lodged with the FIA, on the grounds that the twin chassis tub breached the rules in terms of moveable aerodynamic devices. The FIA upheld the protests and consequently banned the car from competing. Chapman was adamant the car was legal and challenged the other teams and the FIA at every turn, but the decision stood. It reached the point where if the Lotus 88 were entered in the British Grand Prix at Silverstone, the team would lose its championship points and the race itself would lose its place as a championship round of the season.

Chapman was thus forced to update two of his Lotus 87 chassis as replacements for his thwarted brainchild. The Lotus 88 remains a curiosity from a bygone age of F1. Some of the 88's aerodynamics and layout were worked into the successful Lotus 91 which followed in 1982.

== Complete Formula One World Championship results ==
(key)

Year	Entrant	Engines	Tyres	Drivers	1	2	3	4	5	6	7	8	9	10	11	12	13	14	15	Points	WCC
1981	Essex Team Lotus	Ford Cosworth; DFV 3.0 V8	MI		USW	BRA	ARG	SMR	BEL	MON	ESP	FRA	GBR	GER	AUT	NED	ITA	CAN	CPL	22^{1}	7th
1981	Essex Team Lotus	Ford Cosworth; DFV 3.0 V8	MI	Elio de Angelis	PO	PO	DNP													22^{1}	7th
1981	John Player Team Lotus	Ford Cosworth; DFV 3.0 V8	G	Elio de Angelis									PO							22^{1}	7th
1981	John Player Team Lotus	Ford Cosworth; DFV 3.0 V8	G	Nigel Mansell									PO							22^{1}	7th

^1 All points scored by the Lotus 81B and Lotus 87.

== See also ==
- Lotus 78
- Brabham BT46B
