= Williams FW07 =

Formula One motor racing car

Williams FW07 Williams FW07B Williams FW07C Williams FW07D
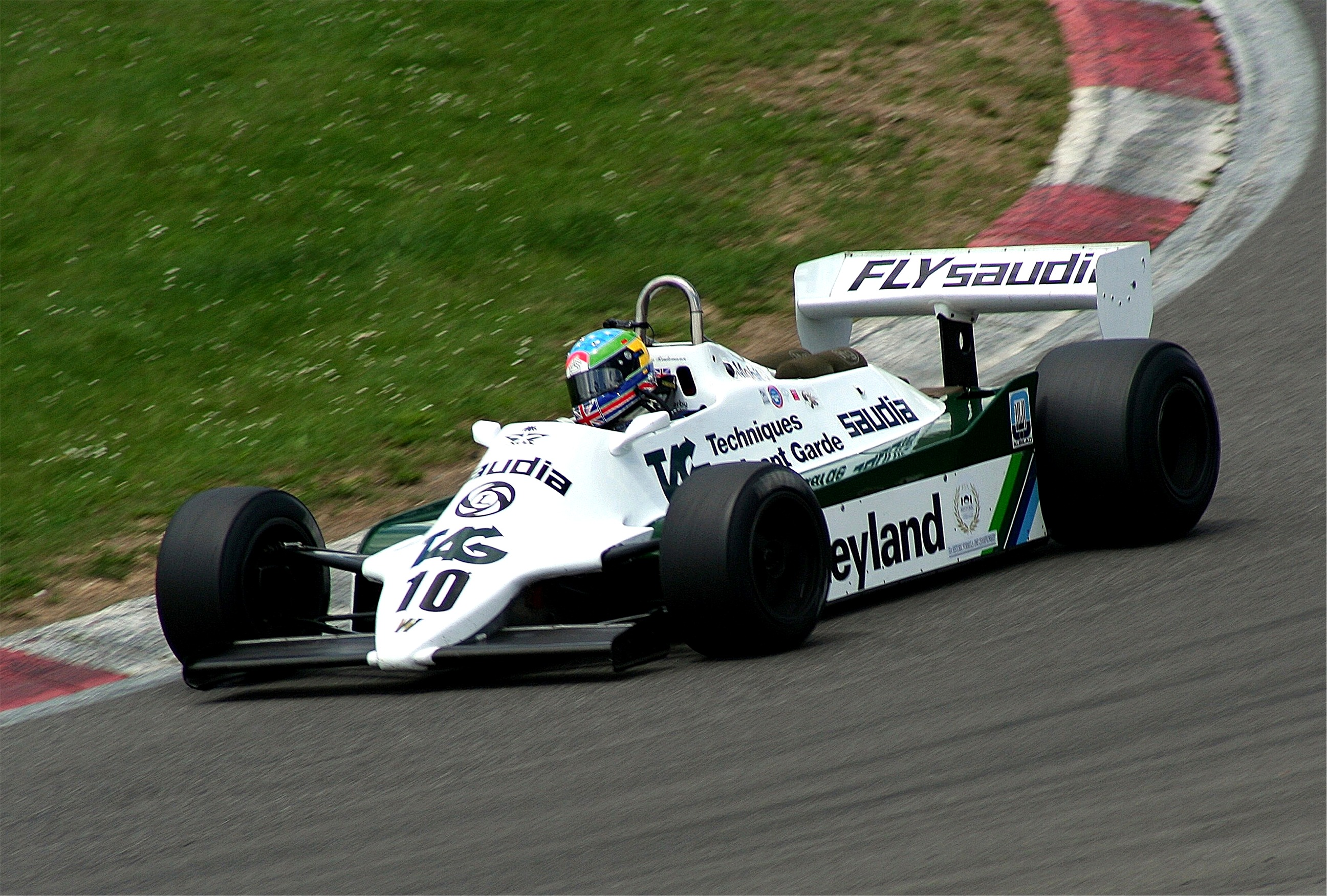
- The FW07C at the Oldtimer Festival
- Category: Formula One
- Constructor: Williams
- Designers: Patrick Head (Technical Director); Neil Oatley (Chief Designer); Frank Dernie (Head of Aerodynamics and R&D)
- Predecessor: FW06
- Successor: FW08

Technical specifications
- Chassis: Aluminium monocoque
- Suspension (front): Lower wishbones and inboard springs
- Suspension (rear): Lower wishbones and inboard springs
- Engine: Ford-Cosworth DFV 2,993 cc (182.6 cu in) V8 naturally aspirated mid-mounted
- Transmission: 1979: Hewland FGB 5-speed manual 1980-1982: Hewland FGA 400 5-speed manual
- Weight: 1979: 579 kg 1980: 585 kg 1981–1982: 540 kg
- Fuel: Mobil
- Tyres: Goodyear (1979–1982); Michelin (1981)

Competition history
- Notable entrants: Albilad-Saudia Racing Team; TAG Williams Racing Team (1981-1982)
- Notable drivers: (Australia) Alan Jones, (Switzerland) Clay Regazzoni, (Argentina) Carlos Reutemann, (South Africa) Desiré Wilson, (United States) Kevin Cogan, (United Kingdom) Rupert Keegan, (Spain) Emilio de Villota (Finland) Keke Rosberg, (United States) Mario Andretti
- Debut: 1979 Spanish Grand Prix
- First win: 1979 British Grand Prix
- Last win: 1981 Caesars Palace Grand Prix
- Last event: 1982 United States Grand Prix West
Races	Wins	Poles	F/Laps
43	15	8	15
- Constructors' Championships: 2 (1980 & 1981)
- Drivers' Championships: 1 (Alan Jones, 1980)

The Williams FW07 was a ground effect Formula One racing car designed by Patrick Head, Frank Dernie, and Neil Oatley for the 1979 Formula One season. Developed versions of the car were further used in the 1980, 1981 and 1982 seasons. It was the first car that won a championship for Williams Racing when it won both the Drivers' and Constructors' in 1980.

== Design ==
=== 1979 ===
It was closely based on the Lotus 79, even being developed in the same wind tunnel at Imperial College London. Some observers, among them Lotus aerodynamicist Peter Wright felt the FW07 was little more than a re-engineered Lotus 79, just having a stiffer chassis. The car was small and simple and extremely light, powered by the ubiquitous Ford Cosworth DFV. It had very clean lines and seemed to be a strong challenger for the new season, but early reliability problems halted any serious threat for the title. While not the first to use ground effects in Formula One, an honour belonging to Colin Chapman and the Lotus 78 (the Lotus 79's predecessor), Dernie may have had a better grasp of the principles than even Chapman. While Head had been developing the Lotus 78's/79's basic principles in the FW07, Chapman's design team was attempting to take the ground effect idea further ahead of rivals on the Lotus 80 engaging the entire bottom of the chassis as an aerodynamic device for generating downforce without the necessity of external wings. Since the Lotus 80 solution had many drawbacks, Chapman devised the twin-chassis concept of Lotus 86 and 88 that should have solved the issues, but it was never allowed to race due to failure to comply with existing technical rules.

When the British Grand Prix at Silverstone came around, chief designer Frank Dernie had designed and implemented a system that ensured that the car's all-important skirts touched the ground at all times and had also corrected some aerodynamic leakage at the back of the chassis between the French and British Grand Prix- Dernie has claimed that the car had a 30 percent aerodynamic improvement. The car's performance was dramatically improved- so much so that Jones set a pole position time 2 seconds faster than the initial next fastest time. Regazzoni won the race, and Jones then easily won the next 3 rounds in Germany, Austria and Holland, and he also won in Canada. The car in the second half of the season was almost unbeatable, and the only other cars that got even close to it were the Ferraris of Jody Scheckter and Gilles Villeneuve, and the Ligier of Jacques Laffite.

=== 1980 ===
The FW07 became FW07B in 1980, and Alan Jones, now with Carlos Reutemann, developed the FW07 further, working especially on setup and suspension strengthening. The car was now so efficient in creating downforce from its ground effect design that the front wings were unnecessary.

At the 1980 French Grand Prix, Alan Jones used for the first time (in a race) a specially prepared John Judd developed Cosworth DFV. Previously Williams had used "development" DFVs allocated by Cosworth to constructors who were judged to provide the best potential to win races against Renault and Ferrari. Modified in John Judd's workshops in Rugby, the Judd-DFV featured an advanced camshaft/cylinder head design which allowed for greater revs than even a development DFV, producing 500-510 BHP at 11,400 RPM compared to 10,800 RPM of a standard DFV. Since both the Renault turbo V6 produced 520 BHP and the Alfa V12 around 525 BHP, it meant that from the French GP onwards both Alan Jones and Carlos Reutemann had a power deficit of just 10-15 BHP compared to the factory based Alfas and Renaults, which gave both Jones and Reutemann a fighting chance on power sensitive circuits such as Hockenheim, the Osterreichring, Zandvoort and Imola. The Williams had the advantage of only requiring a fuel tank size of 173 litres, where the Renault needed a 215 litre fuel tank and the Alfa around 205 litres, effectively giving the 1980 Williams FW07 a superior power to weight ratio.

=== 1981 ===
The FW07B evolved into the FW07C for 1981, and further work was done to the suspension, especially after the FIA banned the moveable skirts needed for effective ground effect. The hydraulic suspension systems were developed by Jones, who hated the rock hard suspension. During a winter test session at the Paul Ricard Circuit in the south of France, he suggested to Frank Williams that to compensate for the harsh ride and the pounding the driver gets while driving the car that he "put suspension on the seat", which Frank thought was a good idea. However, he then replied that Jones should sit on his wallet. 'Yeah,' drawled the tough Aussie, 'then give me something to put in it!' Jones temporarily left Formula One because of the extremely unpleasant ride the FW07C gave, he later described driving the car as "wrecking the internals".

BBC's Horizon series followed the team during winter testing, and later produced the film Gentlemen, Lift Your Skirts which was broadcast during 1981. The film featured extensive behind the scenes footage of the team at work and interviews with the drivers, Frank Williams and Patrick Head.

==== FW07D ====
The FW07D was an experimental six-wheeled test car (four driven rear wheels, and two undriven front wheels) tested by Alan Jones on a single occasion at the Donington Park circuit. With the FW07D proving the concept, its unique design was incorporated into the six-wheeled FW08B.

== Racing history ==
=== 1979 ===
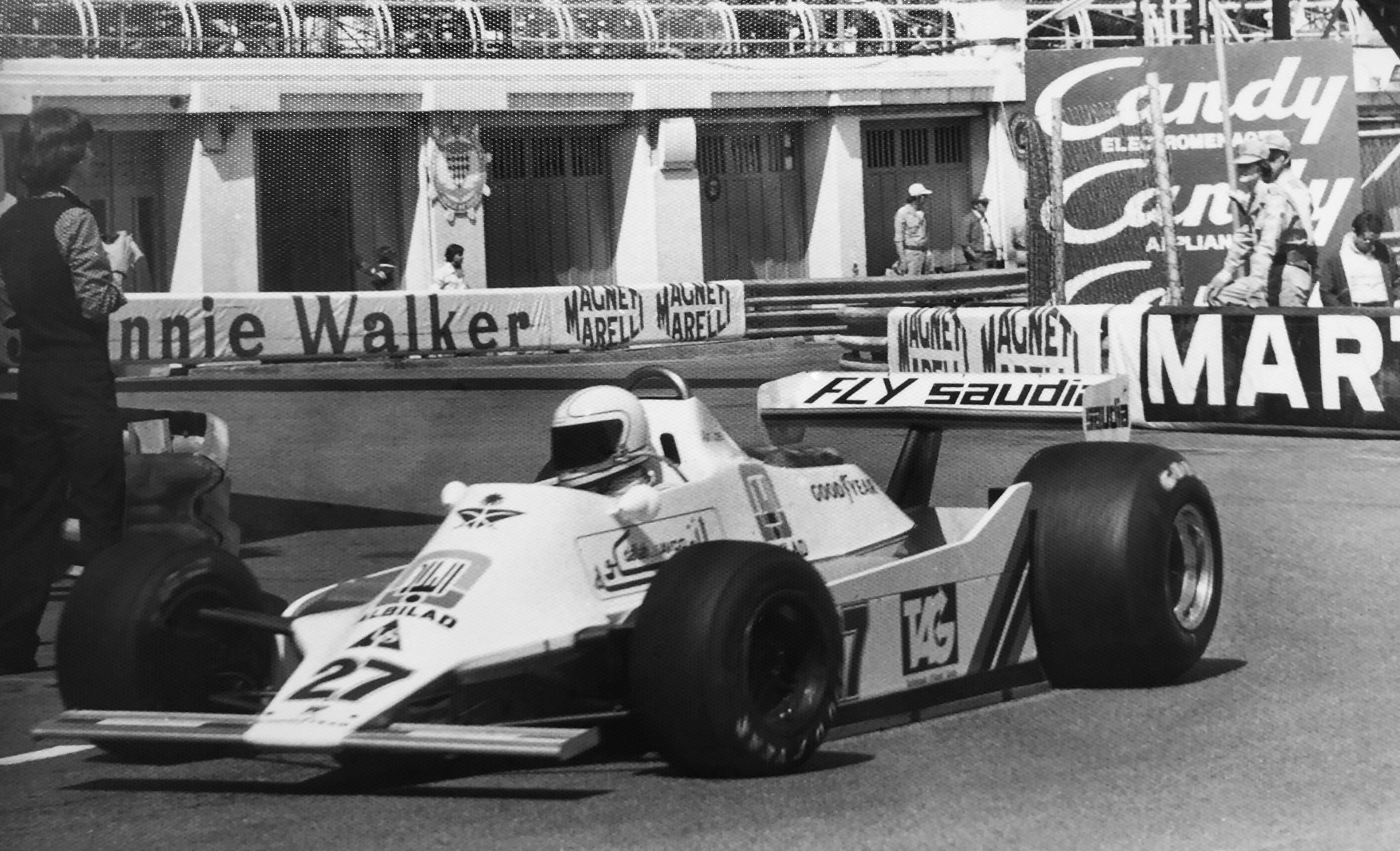
The Williams FW07 (1979).

The car made its debut at the Spanish Grand Prix at Jarama in 1979, the fifth round of the season and the first European round after the non-ground effect FW06 was used for the first four rounds in the Americas and South Africa. The car proved to be reasonably competitive; Australian Alan Jones put the car 13th at Jarama and then 4th for the next round in Belgium; he even led 16 laps of the race before retiring with electrical failure. At the British Grand Prix, Jones stuck the revised Williams on pole and was immediately 2 seconds faster than the next fastest car. The car served to make Team Williams a contender for the first time; Jones retired with fuel pump failure and his Swiss teammate Clay Regazzoni won his last Grand Prix and first since 1976. Jones then won 4 of the next 5 Grand Prix in Germany, Austria, Holland and Canada in a car that was so much quicker than any of the others, particularly around high-speed circuits. But because the car's competitiveness came only at mid-season, Jones and Williams lost the driver's and constructor's championships to South African Jody Scheckter and Ferrari, respectively. But the FW07's competitiveness meant that Williams was a top contender for the 1980 season and beyond.

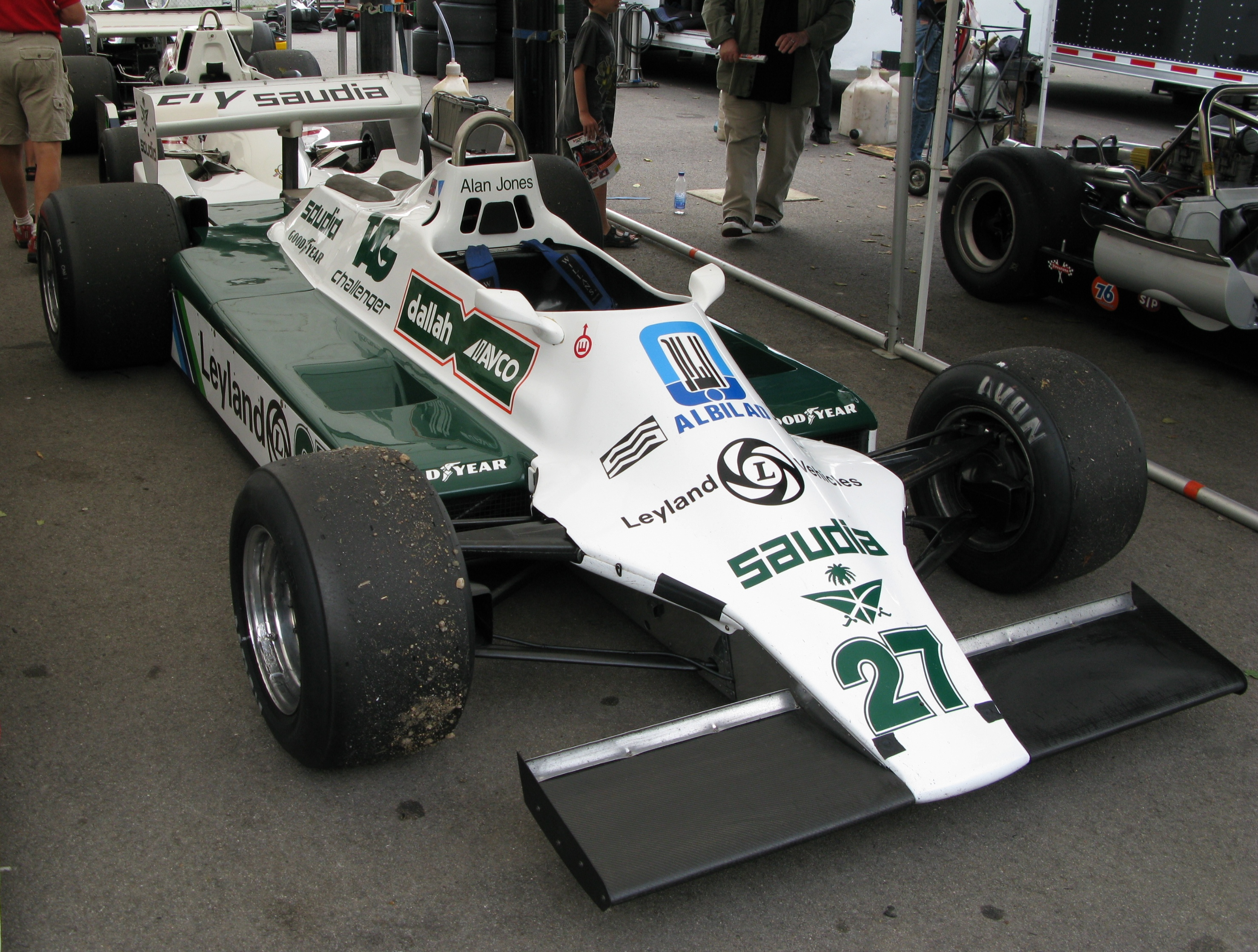
The Williams FW07B (1980).

=== 1980 ===
Regazzoni was replaced by Carlos Reutemann. While the latter and Williams's other driver, Alan Jones, formed a successful partnership, they were not comfortable with each other. Jones won five races in Argentina, France, Britain, Canada and Watkins Glen in the USA to win his only world championship, while Reutemann won at a wet race in Monaco. Williams won also their first Constructors' Championship. The main challenge to the FW07 came from Nelson Piquet in Brabham's neat BT49.

=== 1981 ===
This time it was Reutemann who challenged Piquet for the championship, narrowly missing out in the final race, but Williams took home the constructors' championship after four more wins. The FW07C was the second fastest car of 1981, behind the Renault RE30, but the Williams was more reliable.

Alan Jones lost two potential victories at Monaco and Hockenheim when fuel pressure "hunting" caused the Cosworth DFV to misfire badly, costing the Australian not just wins but also possibly the 1981 World Drivers Championship. The misfiring which afflicted Jones was caused by the high G forces and acceleration generated by the venturi derived ground effects which caused the fuel in the tank to slosh about so violently that the fuel pump was unable to provide the fuel lines with adequate supply. Carlos Reuetemann also had a similar problem in the French Grand Prix in 1981 when he was in a strong position to finish in the points, and this misfire might also have cost Williams the 1981 Drivers Championship as well.

=== 1982 ===
After Jones retired, Williams took on Keke Rosberg in 1982. His mercurial driving seemed to suit the FW07, which although it was now three years old, was still competitive. After 15 wins, 300 points, one drivers' and two constructors' titles the FW07 was replaced by the similarly engineered FW08 from early 1982.

== Historic racing ==
The Williams FW07 and its variants have been regular fixtures in historic racing. The FW07C won the FIA Masters Historic Formula One Championship in 2016, 2018 and 2021, while the FW07B won the championship in 2017.

== Longhorn LR02 ==
Rights to the FW07's design were acquired by Bobby Hillin, owner of the IndyCar team Longhorn Racing. Longhorn Racing built a Williams FW07 copy named Longhorn LR02, with minor adjustments to comply with CART and Indianapolis 500 rules. The car ran in 1981 with Al Unser at the wheel. It achieved a best result of 2nd at the 1981 CART Mexico round. It started the 1981 Indianapolis 500 on the third row in 9th, but finished only 17th.

The car was later sold and turned into a Can-Am car in 1985, with the addition of a 5.0L Chevrolet engine and extensive bodywork, then sold again and raced in SCCA.

== Chassis log ==
FW07	Four built (FW07/1–FW07/4) – all still in existence
FW07/1	Displayed at Long Beach in April 1979. Used by Jones to win the non-championship Gunnar Nilsson Memorial Trophy at Donington Park, and later driven by him to victory at Zandvoort, both in 1979. Also raced by Jones at Jarama, Zolder and Silverstone (also pole position), and used by him only in practice at Monaco (crashed) and Dijon-Prenois, all in 1979. Raced by Regazzoni at the Österreichring, Monza (fastest lap), Montréal and Watkins Glen, again all in 1979. Acquired by RAM Racing, which raced it in 1980 and 1982. Later returned to Williams, and exhibited as part of the Williams Grand Prix Collection. Subjected to a ground-up restoration by John Cadd of JC Historics in 2013/2014. Displayed at Silverstone for 40th anniversary of Williams in June 2017, and auctioned in 2018. Demonstrated by Dario Franchitti at the Red Bull Showrun in Jeddah ahead of the inaugural Saudi Arabian Grand Prix in 2021. Demonstrated by Martin Brundle on the Jeddah circuit during the ensuing race weekend. Owned by Dallah Al-Baraka as of 2021.
FW07/2	Driven for the Williams team only by Regazzoni, including to the team's first (and his final) F1 win, at Silverstone (also fastest lap) in 1979. Also raced by him at Jarama, Zolder, Monaco, Dijon-Prenois, and Zandvoort, all in 1979. Purchased by RAM Racing, which took it to race meetings in 1980, 1981 and 1982. but later returned it to Williams, where it has since been exhibited as part of the Williams Grand Prix Collection. Still part of that collection as of 2018.
FW07/3	Only FW07 chassis not to win a GP. Raced by Jones at Monaco and Dijon-Prenois in 1979. Used for the rest of that year only in practice by Jones at Silverstone, Hockenheim, and Montréal, and by both drivers at the Österreichring (Jones crashed), Monza and Watkins Glen. Acquired by RAM Racing, which raced it in 1980. and later returned it to Williams. Owner "'[n]ot disclosed" as of 2024.
FW07/4	Driven by Jones to four wins, at Hockenheim, the Österreichring, and Montréal (also pole position, fastest lap) in 1979, and at Buenos Aires (also pole position and fastest lap) in 1980. Also raced by Jones at Monza and Watkins Glen (also pole position) in 1979. Used by him only in practice at Zandvoort in 1979, and served as the unused spare car at São Paulo in 1980. Was then the team's number one test car until crashed by Jones (tyre failure) during testing at Donington Park in June 1980. Subsequently exhibited in Saudi Arabia by team sponsors. Sold to Western Australian businessman Peter Briggs in 1981. Displayed at York Motor Museum for two decades; also at Adelaide in 1985, and briefly in Fremantle. Sold to Melbourne aviation engineer Paul Faulkner in 2010; he later fully restored it with considerable assistance from Jones' former Williams mechanic Wayne Eckersley. Supposedly "acquired by a Saudi Arabian enthusiast" (sources vary). Stripped and rebuilt with a new engine by restorer Fifteen Eleven in England in 2021, and then demonstrated by drivers including David Coulthard, Emerson Fittipaldi and Damon Hill as the first F1 car to drive on the Jeddah circuit, at that year's inaugural Saudi Arabian GP weekend. Demonstrated by Johnny Herbert at Albert Park in 2022, as a car "owned by Paul Faulkner". Displayed in Melbourne as part of the Formula 1 Exhibition in 2025–26.
FW07B	Seven built (FW07B/5–FW07B/10 and FW07B/6-R) – FW07B/6 written off (but later rebuilt), others all still in existence
FW07B/5	Driven by Reutemann to victory at Monaco (also fastest lap), and also raced by him at Buenos Aires, São Paulo, Kyalami, Long Beach, Zolder, Jarama, Paul Ricard, Brands Hatch and Hockenheim, all in 1980. Used by Jones only in practice at the Österreichring (crashed), Montréal and Watkins Glen, and served as his unused spare car at Zandvoort, also all in 1980. Converted into the Longhorn LR02 and raced by Al Unser in IndyCar races in 1981 (see above).
FW07B/6	Raced by Jones at São Paulo and Long Beach, and used by him only in practice at Buenos Aires, Kyalami, Monaco, Jarama, and Paul Ricard, all in 1980. Used by both Jones and Reutemann only in practice at Zolder, also in 1980. Sold to Eliseo Salazar in mid-1980 and raced by him later that year. Campaigned by Gary Gove in Can-Am in 1981, at Mid-Ohio and Watkins Glen (crashed in practice and written off). Later completely rebuilt and raced in historic events.
FW07B/7	Driven by Jones to three wins, at Jarama (retrospectively non-championship) (also fastest lap), Paul Ricard (also fastest lap), and Brands Hatch, and also raced by him at Kyalami, Zolder (also pole position), and Zandvoort, all in 1980. Used only in practice by Jones at Long Beach and Imola, and by Reutemann at Montréal and Watkins Glen, also all in 1980. At the end of that year, driven by Jones to victory (also pole position and fastest lap) in the (non-championship) Australian Grand Prix, at Calder in Melbourne. Demonstrated at the Goodwood Festival of Speed in 2008 and 2009, and at the Monterey Motorsports Reunion in 2015 and 2016. Acquired by 2016 by Zak Brown, and "given a workout" by Daniel Ricciardo at Paul Ricard that year. Kept by Brown at United Autosports in England.
FW07B/8	Used by Jones only in practice at Brands Hatch and Hockenheim, both in 1980. Raced by Reutemann to four podium positions and a fourth at the last five championship races of that year, at the Österreichring, Zandvoort, Imola, Montréal and Watkins Glen. Then used by Jones only in practice at Kyalami (non-championship) in 1981. Sold by Williams in 2010 to collector Jorge Ferioli, who normally keeps it in England. Demonstrated by Gastón Mazzacane (in place of the originally billed possible demonstrator Reutemann) during a Turismo Carretera weekend at La Plata, Argentina, in 2010. On display in the newly-inaugurated Reutemann Space at the Museo Juan Manuel Fangio in Balcarce, Argentina, as of November 2023.
FW07B/9	Raced by Jones to two victories, at Montréal and Watkins Glen (also fastest lap), and earlier at Hockenheim (also pole position and fastest lap), the Österreichring and Imola (also fastest lap), all in 1980. Used only in practice by Reutemann at Hockenheim and by Jones at Zandvoort (crashed), also in 1980. Then raced by Jones at Kyalami (non-championship) in 1981. Still part of the Williams Grand Prix Collection as of 2017.
FW07B/10	Driven by Reutemann to a win at Kyalami (non-championship) in 1981. Used by Jones only in practice at Long Beach and Jacarepaguá, also in 1981. At the disposal of a Williams sponsor for private testing in 1982 and 1983. Stored at Williams 1984–1988. Exhibited as part of the Williams Grand Prix Collection 1989–1995. Demonstrated at Goodwood in 1996 (Jonathan Palmer), 1997 (Jason Plato) and 2000 (Jones). On loan to the Donington Grand Prix Collection 2000–2004. Sold in 2005 to new owner who campaigned it very successfully in North America, and sold again in 2024. Kept in the United Kingdom as of 2023.
FW07B/6-R	Did not participate in any F1 race. Sources unclear as to whether this chassis is just the rebuilt version of FW07B/6. Kept in the United States as of 2019.
FW07C	Six built (FW07C/11, FW07C/12, and FW07C/14 – FW07C/17) – all still in existence
FW07C/11	Raced by Jones to victory on its debut at Long Beach (also fastest lap) in 1981. Also raced by him at Jacarepaguá, Buenos Aires, Imola, Zolder, Dijon-Prenois, and Silverstone, all in 1981. Later acquired by a Belgian collector and campaigned successfully in historic racing. Kept in Belgium as of 2023.
FW07C/12	Driven by Reutemann to two wins, controversially at São Paulo, and also at Zolder (also pole position and fastest lap), both in 1981. Also raced by him, mostly to podium finishes, at Long Beach, Buenos Aires, Imola, Monaco, Jarama, Dijon-Prenois, and Silverstone, all in 1981. Served as the unused spare car at Montréal and Caesars Palace, also in 1981. A quarter of a century later, Reutemann described it as "[a] very nice car", and indicated that he would rather have raced it in the last few events of 1981 in preference to chassis FW07C/17. Still part of the Williams Grand Prix Collection as of 2017.
FW07C/14	Used only in practice by Jones at Buenos Aires and Zolder; also served as his unused spare car at Imola and Monaco, all in 1981. Then served as Reutemann's unused spare car at Jarama and Silverstone, was used by him only in practice at Hockenheim, and finally was raced by him at the Österreichring, also in 1981. Later served as an unused spare car at Kyalami and Long Beach, both in 1982. Under subsequent ownerships, has been successful with several different drivers in historic racing. Kept in the United States as of 2021.
FW07C/15	Raced by Jones at Monaco (also fastest time) and Jarama (also fastest time), then used by him only in practice at Dijon-Prenois, and served as his unused spare car at Silverstone, all in 1981. Raced by Reutemann at Hockenheim, served as Jones' unused spare car at the Österreichring and Zandvoort, and as an unused team spare car at Monza, Montréal, and Caesars Palace, also all in 1981. Then raced by Rosberg at Kyalami and Long Beach, and served as an unused spare car at Jacarepaguá, all in 1982. Campaigned by Mike Wilds in England in 1983, and by Walter Lechner in Can-Am in 1984. In Italy as of 2017.
FW07C/16	Raced by Jones to (his final) win, at Caesars Palace, and also previously by him at Hockenheim (also fastest lap), the Österreichring, Zandvoort (also fastest lap), Monza, and Montréal, all in 1981. Ahead of the 1982 season, fitted with some of the upgrades developed for the FW08 and applied to the experimental FW07D (see below); thereafter referred to in some sources as "FW07D/16". Raced by Reutemann at Kyalami and Jacarepaguá, and by Andretti at Long Beach, all in 1982. Sold in 1984 to French collector Jacques Setton together with two other FW07s, and in 2000 to Roy Walzer. Subsequently a front-running competitor in historic racing, under several owners. Kept in the United Kingdom as of 2018.
FW07C/17	The final FW07 chassis ever built to race. Raced by Reutemann at Zandvoort, Monza (also fastest lap), Montréal, and Caesars Palace (also pole position), all in 1981. Reutemann indicated a quarter of a century later that he would rather have raced chassis FW07C/12 in the last few events of 1981. Raced by Rosberg at Jacarepaguá (disqualified) in 1982. Restored by Williams Heritage in the mid-2010s and then sold to a private owner, who raced it very successfully. Owned by Mike Cantillon and kept in the United Kingdom as of 2023.
FW07D	One built
	Experimental six wheel chassis (two front wheels, four small driven rear wheels), constructed as Williams unable to obtain turbocharged engine. Tested by Jones at Donington Park immediately after Caesars Palace race in 1981, and soon afterwards by Rosberg at Paul Ricard and Palmer at Croix-en-Ternois, northern France. Unraced. Later superseded by experimental six wheel FW08. Sources do not indicate that it was ever given a chassis number, or its ultimate fate.

== Complete Formula One World Championship results ==
(key) (results in bold indicate pole position) (results in italics indicate fastest lap)

Year	Entrant	Chassis	Engine	Tyres	Drivers	1	2	3	4	5	6	7	8	9	10	11	12	13	14	15	16	Points	WCC
1979	Albilad-Saudia Racing Team	FW07	Ford Cosworth DFV	**G**		ARG	BRA	RSA	USW	ESP	BEL	MON	FRA	GBR	GER	AUT	NED	ITA	CAN	USA		**75***	2nd
1979	Albilad-Saudia Racing Team	FW07	Ford Cosworth DFV	**G**	Alan Jones					Ret	Ret	Ret	4	**Ret**	1	1	1	9	**1**	Ret		**75***	2nd
1979	Albilad-Saudia Racing Team	FW07	Ford Cosworth DFV	**G**	Clay Regazzoni					Ret	Ret	2	6	1	2	5	Ret	3	3	Ret		**75***	2nd
1980	Albilad-Saudia Racing Team	FW07; FW07B	Ford Cosworth DFV	**G**		ARG	BRA	RSA	USW	BEL	MON	FRA	GBR	GER	AUT	NED	ITA	CAN	USA			**120**	1st
1980	Albilad-Saudia Racing Team	FW07; FW07B	Ford Cosworth DFV	**G**	Alan Jones	**1**	3	Ret	Ret	**2**	Ret	1	1	**3**	2	11	2	1	1			**120**	1st
1980	Albilad-Saudia Racing Team	FW07; FW07B	Ford Cosworth DFV	**G**	Carlos Reutemann	Ret	Ret	5	Ret	3	1	6	3	2	3	4	3	2	2			**120**	1st
1980	RAM Penthouse Rizla Racing	FW07	Ford Cosworth DFV	**G**	Rupert Keegan								11	DNQ	15	DNQ	11	DNQ	9			**120**	1st
1980	RAM Rainbow Jeans Racing	FW07	Ford Cosworth DFV	**G**	Kevin Cogan													DNQ				**120**	1st
1980	RAM Theodore	FW07	Ford Cosworth DFV	**G**	Geoff Lees														DNQ			**120**	1st
1980	Brands Hatch Racing	FW07	Ford Cosworth DFV	**G**	Desiré Wilson								DNQ									**120**	1st
1981	TAG Williams Racing Team	FW07C	Ford Cosworth DFV	**M** **G**		USW	BRA	ARG	SMR	BEL	MON	ESP	FRA	GBR	GER	AUT	NED	ITA	CAN	CPL		**95**	1st
1981	TAG Williams Racing Team	FW07C	Ford Cosworth DFV	**M** **G**	Alan Jones	1	2	4	12	Ret	2	7	17	Ret	11	4	3	2	Ret	1		**95**	1st
1981	Albilad Williams Racing Team	FW07C	Ford Cosworth DFV	**M** **G**	Carlos Reutemann	2	1	2	3	**1**	Ret	4	10	2	Ret	5	Ret	3	10	**8**		**95**	1st
1981	Equipe Banco Occidental	FW07	Ford Cosworth DFV	**M**	Emilio de Villota							EX										**95**	1st
1982	TAG Williams Racing Team	FW07C	Ford Cosworth DFV	**G**		RSA	BRA	USW	SMR	BEL	MON	DET	CAN	NED	GBR	FRA	GER	AUT	SUI	ITA	CPL	**58***	4th
1982	TAG Williams Racing Team	FW07C	Ford Cosworth DFV	**G**	Carlos Reutemann	2	Ret															**58***	4th
1982	TAG Williams Racing Team	FW07C	Ford Cosworth DFV	**G**	Keke Rosberg	5	DSQ	2														**58***	4th
1982	TAG Williams Racing Team	FW07C	Ford Cosworth DFV	**G**	Mario Andretti			Ret														**58***	4th

* 4 points in 1979 scored using the FW06
* 44 points in 1982 scored using the FW08

== See also ==
- Lotus 79
- Brabham BT49
