= 1981 British Grand Prix =

- Race 9 of 15 in the 1981 Formula One World Championship
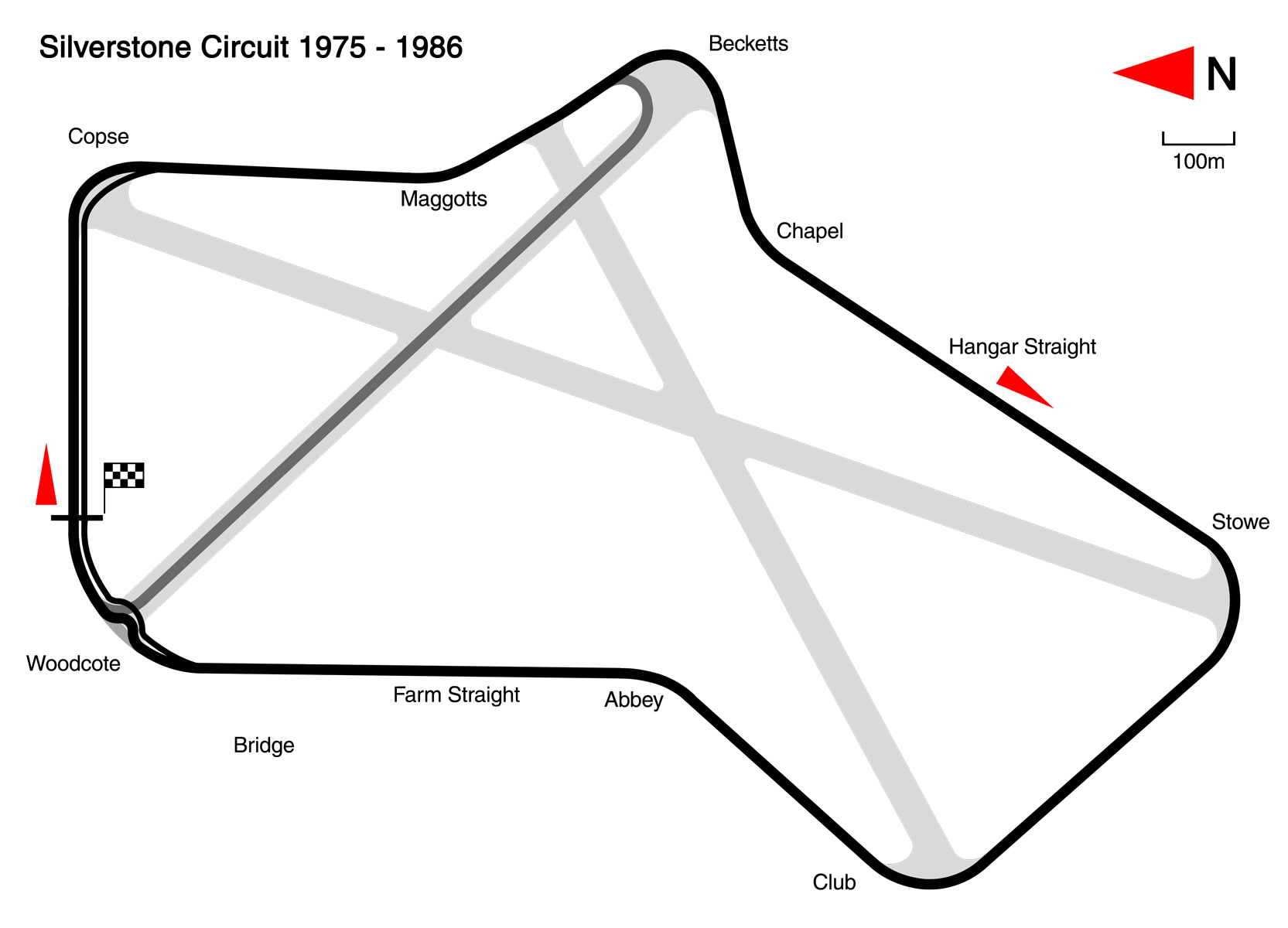

Race details
- Date: 18 July 1981
- Official name: XXXIV Marlboro British Grand Prix
- Location: Silverstone Circuit, Northamptonshire, Great Britain
- Course: Permanent racing facility
- Course length: 4.718 km (2.932 miles)
- Distance: 68 laps, 320.824 km (199.351 miles)
- Weather: Dry

Pole position
Driver	(France) René Arnoux	Renault
- Time: 1:11.000

Fastest lap
Driver	(France) René Arnoux	Renault
- Time: 1:15.067 on lap 50

Podium
First	(United Kingdom) John Watson	McLaren-Ford
Second	(Argentina) Carlos Reutemann	Williams-Ford
Third	(France) Jacques Laffite	Ligier-Matra

The 1981 British Grand Prix was a Formula One motor race held at Silverstone on 18 July 1981. It was the ninth race of the 1981 Formula One World Championship. John Watson won his first race since the 1976 Austrian Grand Prix, and McLaren's and a British driver's first since James Hunt's victory at the 1977 Japanese Grand Prix. The race also marked the first victory for a carbon composite monocoque F1 car, the McLaren MP4/1.

== Classification ==
=== Qualifying ===
Pos	No	Driver	Constructor	Q1	Q2	Gap
1	16	(France) René Arnoux	Renault	1:12.158	1:11.000	—
2	15	(France) Alain Prost	Renault	1:12.237	1:11.046	+0.046
3	5	(Brazil) Nelson Piquet	Brabham-Ford	1:12.328	1:11.952	+0.952
4	28	(France) Didier Pironi	Ferrari	1:14.070	1:12.644	+1.644
5	7	(United Kingdom) John Watson	McLaren-Ford	1:13.370	1:12.712	+1.712
6	8	(Italy) Andrea de Cesaris	McLaren-Ford	1:13.976	1:12.728	+1.728
7	1	(Australia) Alan Jones	Williams-Ford	1:12.998	1:13.250	+1.998
8	27	(Canada) Gilles Villeneuve	Ferrari	1:14.182	1:13.311	+2.311
9	2	(Argentina) Carlos Reutemann	Williams-Ford	1:13.467	1:13.371	+2.371
10	29	(Italy) Riccardo Patrese	Arrows-Ford	1:15.217	1:13.762	+2.762
11	22	(United States) Mario Andretti	Alfa Romeo	1:14.440	1:13.928	+2.928
12	23	(Italy) Bruno Giacomelli	Alfa Romeo	1:14.119	1:14.442	+3.119
13	6	(Mexico) Héctor Rebaque	Brabham-Ford	1:14.594	1:14.542	+3.542
14	26	(France) Jacques Laffite	Ligier-Matra	1:15.313	1:14.798	+3.798
15	25	(France) Patrick Tambay	Ligier-Matra	1:15.656	1:14.976	+3.976
16	20	(Finland) Keke Rosberg	Fittipaldi-Ford	1:16.695	1:15.165	+4.165
17	17	(Republic of Ireland) Derek Daly	March-Ford	1:15.189	1:15.303	+4.189
18	30	(Italy) Siegfried Stohr	Arrows-Ford	1:17.229	1:15.304	+4.304
19	4	(Italy) Michele Alboreto	Tyrrell-Ford	1:16.446	1:15.850	+4.850
20	32	(France) Jean-Pierre Jarier	Osella-Ford	1:15.943	1:15.898	+4.898
21	9	(Sweden) Slim Borgudd	ATS-Ford	1:16.758	1:15.959	+4.959
22	11	(Italy) Elio de Angelis	Lotus-Ford	1:16.029†	1:15.971	+4.971
23	3	(United States) Eddie Cheever	Tyrrell-Ford	1:16.381	1:16.099	+5.099
24	33	(Switzerland) Marc Surer	Theodore-Ford	1:17.124	1:16.155	+5.155
25	21	(Brazil) Chico Serra	Fittipaldi-Ford	1:18.173	1:16.360	+5.360
26	35	(United Kingdom) Brian Henton	Toleman-Hart	1:16.388	1:19.602	+5.388
27	12	(United Kingdom) Nigel Mansell	Lotus-Ford	1:15.992†	1:16.432	+5.432
28	14	(Chile) Eliseo Salazar	Ensign-Ford	1:17.053	1:16.694	+5.694
29	36	(United Kingdom) Derek Warwick	Toleman-Hart	1:17.998	1:16.891	+5.891
30	31	(Italy) Beppe Gabbiani	Osella-Ford	1:20.377	1:17.784	+6.784

- †-time disallowed.

=== Race ===
Pos	No	Driver	Constructor	Tyre	Laps	Time/Retired	Grid	Points
1	7	(United Kingdom) John Watson	McLaren-Ford	M	68	1:26:54.80	5	9
2	2	(Argentina) Carlos Reutemann	Williams-Ford	G	68	+40.65	9	6
3	26	(France) Jacques Laffite	Ligier-Matra	M	67	+1 lap	14	4
4	3	(United States) Eddie Cheever	Tyrrell-Ford	M	67	+1 lap	23	3
5	6	(Mexico) Héctor Rebaque	Brabham-Ford	G	67	+1 lap	13	2
6	9	(Sweden) Slim Borgudd	ATS-Ford	A	67	+1 lap	21	1
7	17	(Republic of Ireland) Derek Daly	March-Ford	A	66	+2 laps	17	
8	32	(France) Jean-Pierre Jarier	Osella-Ford	M	65	+3 laps	20	
9	16	(France) René Arnoux	Renault	M	64	Distributor	1	
10	29	(Italy) Riccardo Patrese	Arrows-Ford	P	64	Engine	10	
11	33	(Switzerland) Marc Surer	Theodore-Ford	A	61	Out of fuel	24	
Ret	22	(United States) Mario Andretti	Alfa Romeo	M	59	Throttle	11	
Ret	20	(Finland) Keke Rosberg	Fittipaldi-Ford	M	56	Suspension	16	
DSQ	11	(Italy) Elio de Angelis	Lotus-Ford	G	25	Ignoring yellow flags	22	
Ret	15	(France) Alain Prost	Renault	M	17	Distributor	2	
Ret	25	(France) Patrick Tambay	Ligier-Matra	M	15	Clutch	15	
Ret	28	(France) Didier Pironi	Ferrari	M	13	Turbo	4	
Ret	5	(Brazil) Nelson Piquet	Brabham-Ford	G	11	Tyre	3	
Ret	23	(Italy) Bruno Giacomelli	Alfa Romeo	M	5	Transmission	12	
Ret	27	(Canada) Gilles Villeneuve	Ferrari	M	4	Spun off	8	
Ret	1	(Australia) Alan Jones	Williams-Ford	G	3	Collision	7	
Ret	8	(Italy) Andrea de Cesaris	McLaren-Ford	M	3	Spun off	6	
Ret	4	(Italy) Michele Alboreto	Tyrrell-Ford	M	1	Clutch	19	
Ret	30	(Italy) Siegfried Stohr	Arrows-Ford	P	0	Spun off	18	
DNQ	21	(Brazil) Chico Serra	Fittipaldi-Ford	M				
DNQ	35	(United Kingdom) Brian Henton	Toleman-Hart	P				
DNQ	12	(United Kingdom) Nigel Mansell	Lotus-Ford	G				
DNQ	14	(Chile) Eliseo Salazar	Ensign-Ford	A				
DNQ	36	(United Kingdom) Derek Warwick	Toleman-Hart	P				
DNQ	31	(Italy) Beppe Gabbiani	Osella-Ford	M				

== Notes ==
- This was the 200th Grand Prix start for McLaren. In those 200 races, McLaren had won 25 Grands Prix, achieved 78 podium finishes, 18 pole positions, 14 fastest laps, 2 Grand Slams, and had won 2 Driver's and 1 Constructor's Championship.

== Championship standings after the race ==
Drivers' Championship standings

Pos	Driver	Points
1	(Argentina) Carlos Reutemann	43
2	(Brazil) Nelson Piquet	26
3	(Australia) Alan Jones	24
4	(Canada) Gilles Villeneuve	21
5	(France) Jacques Laffite	21

Constructors' Championship standings

Pos	Constructor	Points
1	(United Kingdom) Williams-Ford	67
2	(United Kingdom) Brabham-Ford	31
3	(Italy) Ferrari	28
4	(France) Ligier-Matra	21
5	(United Kingdom) McLaren-Ford	20

- Note: Only the top five positions are included for both sets of standings.

Previous race: 1981 French Grand Prix	FIA Formula One World Championship; 1981 season	Next race: 1981 German Grand Prix
Previous race: 1980 British Grand Prix	British Grand Prix	Next race: 1982 British Grand Prix
