= 1981 French Grand Prix =

- Race 8 of 15 in the 1981 Formula One World Championship

Race details
- Date: 5 July 1981
- Official name: 67e Grand Prix de France
- Location: Dijon-Prenois, Dijon, France
- Course: Permanent racing facility
- Course length: 3.801 km (2.361 miles)
- Distance: 80 laps, 304.08 km (188.88 miles)
- Weather: Dry, then wet at half distance, then dry again

Pole position
Driver	(France) René Arnoux	Renault
- Time: 1:05.95

Fastest lap
Driver	(France) Alain Prost	Renault
- Time: 1:09.14 on lap 64

Podium
First	(France) Alain Prost	Renault
Second	(United Kingdom) John Watson	McLaren-Ford
Third	(Brazil) Nelson Piquet	Brabham-Ford

The 1981 French Grand Prix was a Formula One motor race held at Dijon-Prenois near Dijon, France on 5 July 1981. It was the eighth race of the 1981 Formula One World Championship.

The 80-lap race was won by Alain Prost, driving a Renault. On home soil, Prost scored the first of an eventual 51 Grand Prix victories, in a race that was stopped after 58 laps due to heavy rain and then restarted, with aggregate times determining the final positions. John Watson finished second in his McLaren-Ford, while Nelson Piquet, who had been leading in his Brabham-Ford when the race was stopped, finished third.

Prior to the race, Jean-Pierre Jabouille decided to retire from Formula One, having not fully recovered from the leg injuries he had sustained in Canada the previous year. His place at Ligier was taken for the rest of the season by Patrick Tambay, who moved from Theodore.

== Classification ==
=== Qualifying ===
Pos	No	Driver	Constructor	Q1	Q2	Gap
1	16	(France) René Arnoux	Renault	1:07.09	1:05.95	—
2	7	(United Kingdom) John Watson	McLaren-Ford	1:07.05	1:06.36	+0.41
3	15	(France) Alain Prost	Renault	1:07.57	1:06.36	+0.41
4	5	(Brazil) Nelson Piquet	Brabham-Ford	1:09.21	1:06.91	+0.96
5	8	(Italy) Andrea de Cesaris	McLaren-Ford	1:08.83	1:07.03	+1.08
6	26	(France) Jacques Laffite	Ligier-Matra	1:08.71	1:07.09	+1.14
7	2	(Argentina) Carlos Reutemann	Williams-Ford	1:08.83	1:07.42	+1.47
8	11	(Italy) Elio de Angelis	Lotus-Ford	1:08.40	1:07.52	+1.57
9	1	(Australia) Alan Jones	Williams-Ford	1:09.28	1:07.53	+1.58
10	22	(United States) Mario Andretti	Alfa Romeo	1:10.09	1:07.56	+1.61
11	27	(Canada) Gilles Villeneuve	Ferrari	1:07.60	1:07.68	+1.65
12	23	(Italy) Bruno Giacomelli	Alfa Romeo	1:09.81	1:07.63	+1.68
13	12	(United Kingdom) Nigel Mansell	Lotus-Ford	1:09.06	1:07.72	+1.77
14	28	(France) Didier Pironi	Ferrari	1:08.09	1:08.27	+2.14
15	6	(Mexico) Héctor Rebaque	Brabham-Ford	1:09.69	1:08.21	+2.26
16	25	(France) Patrick Tambay	Ligier-Matra	1:09.51	1:08.47	+2.52
17	20	(Finland) Keke Rosberg	Fittipaldi-Ford	1:10.13	1:09.35	+3.40
18	29	(Italy) Riccardo Patrese	Arrows-Ford	1:09.37	1:10.14	+3.42
19	3	(United States) Eddie Cheever	Tyrrell-Ford	1:11.50	1:09.88	+3.93
20	17	(Republic of Ireland) Derek Daly	March-Ford	1:12.10	1:09.94	+3.99
21	33	(Switzerland) Marc Surer	Theodore-Ford	1:19.46	1:10.12	+4.17
22	14	(Chile) Eliseo Salazar	Ensign-Ford	1:15.59	1:10.50	+4.55
23	4	(Italy) Michele Alboreto	Tyrrell-Ford	1:12.37	1:10.64	+4.69
24	21	(Brazil) Chico Serra	Fittipaldi-Ford	1:13.60	1:10.86	+4.91
25	30	(Italy) Siegfried Stohr	Arrows-Ford	1:13.13	1:11.24	+5.29
26	35	(United Kingdom) Brian Henton	Toleman-Hart	1:29.13	1:11.28	+5.33
27	9	(Sweden) Slim Borgudd	ATS-Ford	1:14.62	1:12.20	+6.25
28	31	(Italy) Beppe Gabbiani	Osella-Ford	1:12.24	1:36.20	+6.29
29	36	(United Kingdom) Derek Warwick	Toleman-Hart	1:13.65	no time	+7.70

=== Race ===
Pos	No	Driver	Constructor	Tyre	Laps	Time/Retired	Grid	Points
1	15	(France) Alain Prost	Renault	MI	80	1:35:48.13	3	9
2	7	(United Kingdom) John Watson	McLaren-Ford	MI	80	+ 2.29	2	6
3	5	(Brazil) Nelson Piquet	Brabham-Ford	G	80	+ 24.22	4	4
4	16	(France) René Arnoux	Renault	MI	80	+ 42.30	1	3
5	28	(France) Didier Pironi	Ferrari	MI	79	+ 1 Lap	14	2
6	11	(Italy) Elio de Angelis	Lotus-Ford	MI	79	+ 1 Lap	8	1
7	12	(United Kingdom) Nigel Mansell	Lotus-Ford	MI	79	+ 1 Lap	13	
8	22	(United States) Mario Andretti	Alfa Romeo	MI	79	+ 1 Lap	10	
9	6	(Mexico) Héctor Rebaque	Brabham-Ford	G	78	+ 2 Laps	15	
10	2	(Argentina) Carlos Reutemann	Williams-Ford	G	78	+ 2 Laps	7	
11	8	(Italy) Andrea de Cesaris	McLaren-Ford	MI	78	+ 2 Laps	5	
12	33	(Switzerland) Marc Surer	Theodore-Ford	A	78	+ 2 Laps	21	
13	3	(United States) Eddie Cheever	Tyrrell-Ford	MI	77	+ 3 Laps	19	
14	29	(Italy) Riccardo Patrese	Arrows-Ford	MI	77	+ 3 Laps	18	
15	23	(Italy) Bruno Giacomelli	Alfa Romeo	MI	77	+ 3 Laps	12	
16	4	(Italy) Michele Alboreto	Tyrrell-Ford	MI	77	+ 3 Laps	23	
17	1	(Australia) Alan Jones	Williams-Ford	G	76	Collision	9	
Ret	26	(France) Jacques Laffite	Ligier-Matra	MI	57	Suspension	6	
Ret	17	(Republic of Ireland) Derek Daly	March-Ford	A	55	Engine	20	
Ret	27	(Canada) Gilles Villeneuve	Ferrari	MI	41	Electrical	11	
Ret	25	(France) Patrick Tambay	Ligier-Matra	MI	30	Wheel Bearing	16	
Ret	20	(Finland) Keke Rosberg	Fittipaldi-Ford	MI	11	Suspension	17	
Ret	14	(Chile) Eliseo Salazar	Ensign-Ford	A	6	Suspension	22	
DNS	21	(Brazil) Chico Serra	Fittipaldi-Ford	MI	0	Non starter	24	
DNQ	30	(Italy) Siegfried Stohr	Arrows-Ford	MI				
DNQ	35	(United Kingdom) Brian Henton	Toleman-Hart	P				
DNQ	9	(Sweden) Slim Borgudd	ATS-Ford	MI				
DNQ	31	(Italy) Beppe Gabbiani	Osella-Ford	MI				
DNQ	36	(United Kingdom) Derek Warwick	Toleman-Hart	P				

== Notes ==
- This was the 25th pole position for a French driver.
- This was the 5th Grand Prix win and 10th podium finish for Renault and a Renault-powered car.

== Championship standings after the race ==
Drivers' Championship standings

Pos	Driver	Points
1	(Argentina) Carlos Reutemann	37
2	(Brazil) Nelson Piquet	26
3	(Australia) Alan Jones	24
4	(Canada) Gilles Villeneuve	21
5	(France) Jacques Laffite	17

Constructors' Championship standings

Pos	Constructor	Points
1	(United Kingdom) Williams-Ford	61
2	(United Kingdom) Brabham-Ford	29
3	(Italy) Ferrari	28
4	(France) Renault	18
5	(France) Ligier-Matra	17

- Note: Only the top five positions are included for both sets of standings.

Previous race: 1981 Spanish Grand Prix	FIA Formula One World Championship; 1981 season	Next race: 1981 British Grand Prix
Previous race: 1980 French Grand Prix	French Grand Prix	Next race: 1982 French Grand Prix; Next race at Dijon: 1982 Swiss Grand Prix
