= 1981 Formula One World Championship =

35th season of FIA Formula One motor racing

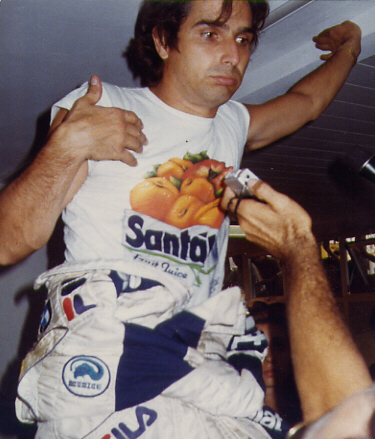
Nelson Piquet won the first of his 3 drivers' championships, driving for the Brabham team.

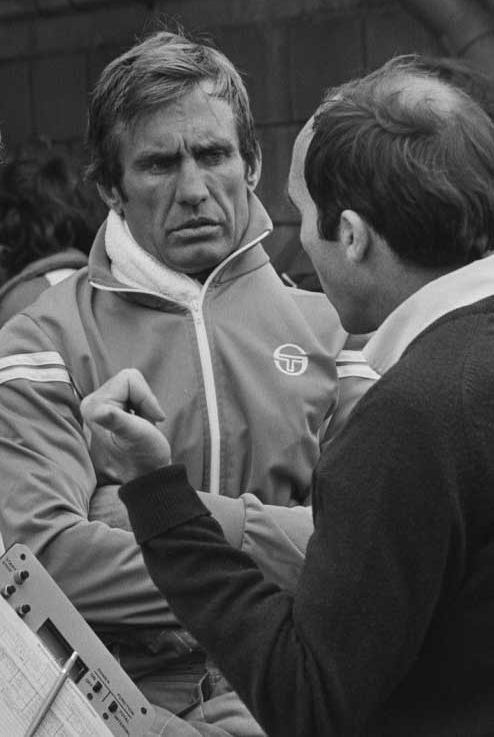
Carlos Reutemann, driving for Williams, placed second in the Drivers' Championship by just one point.

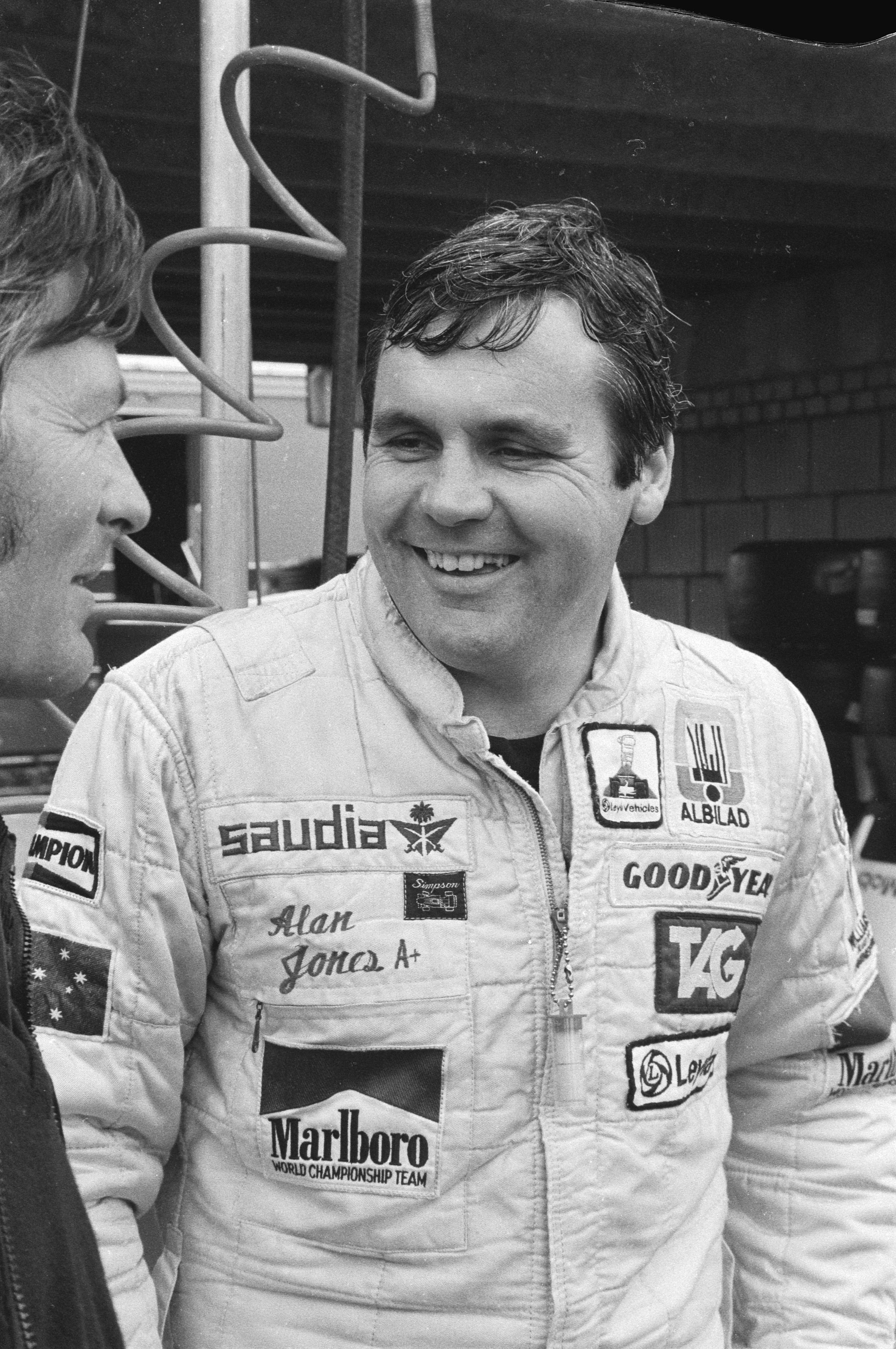
Defending World Champion and Reutemann's teammate Alan Jones, placed third in the Drivers' Championship.

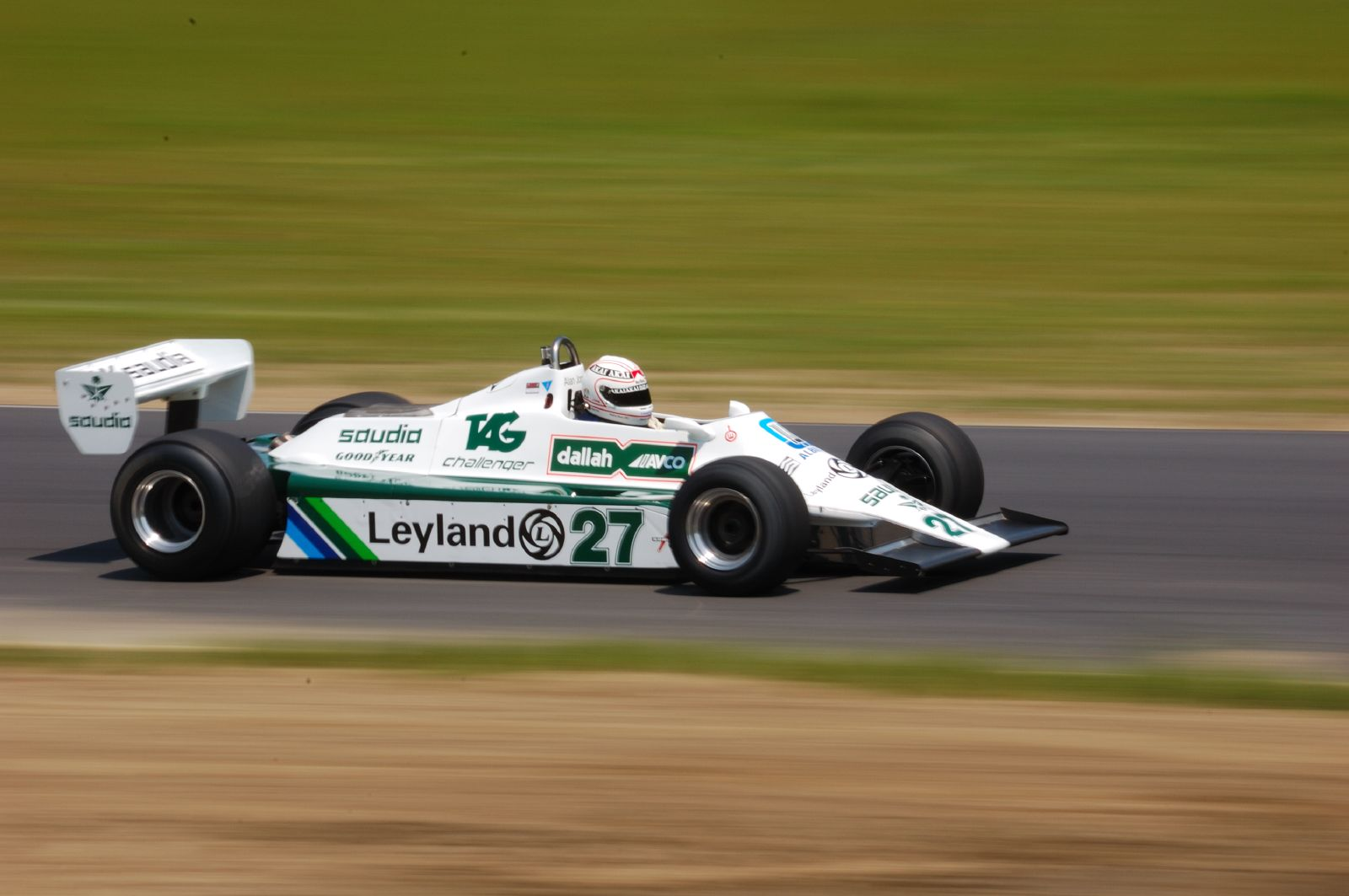
Williams won the 1981 Constructors' Championship with the FW07C.

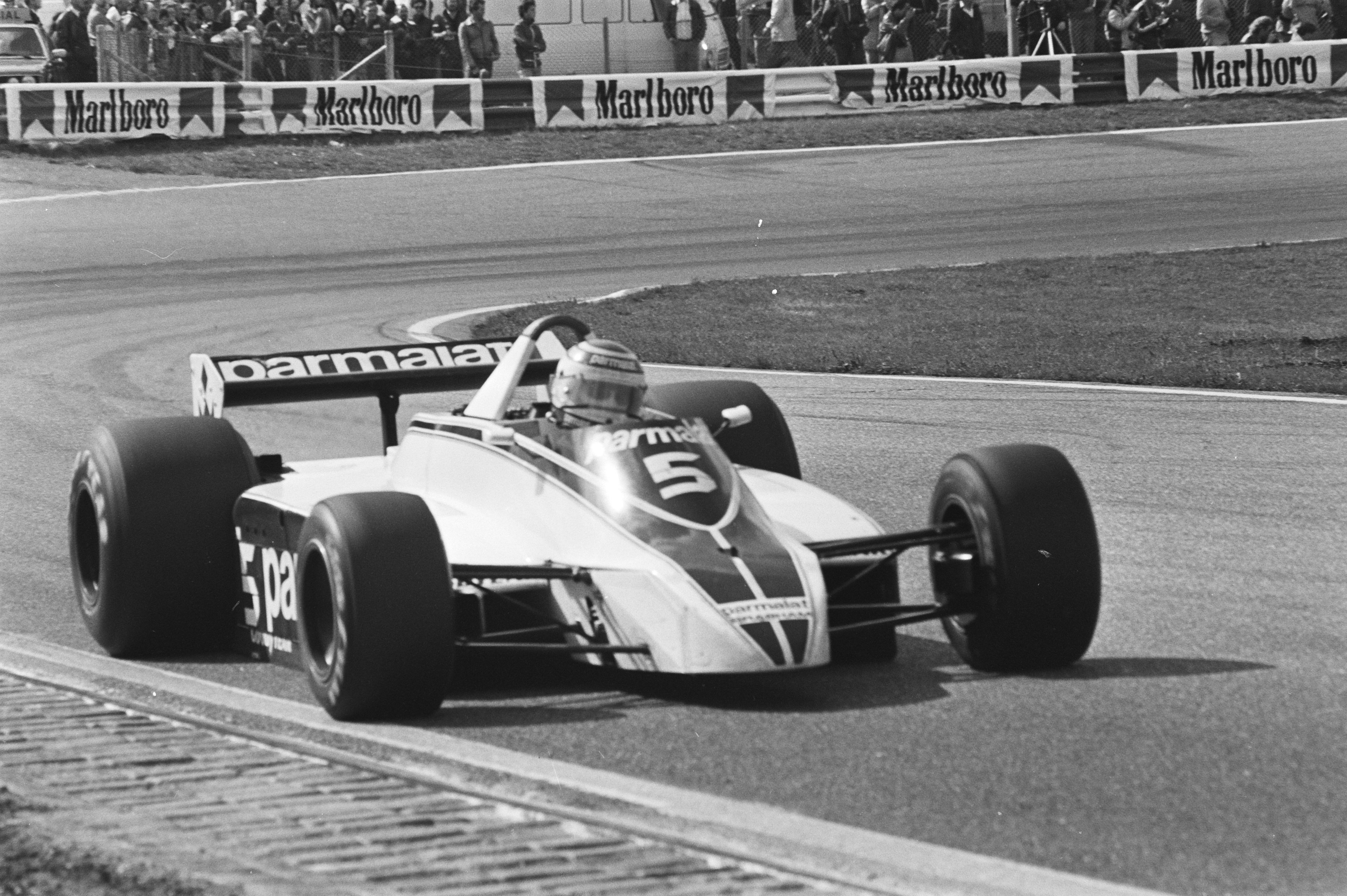
Brabham placed second in the Constructors' Championship with the BT49C.

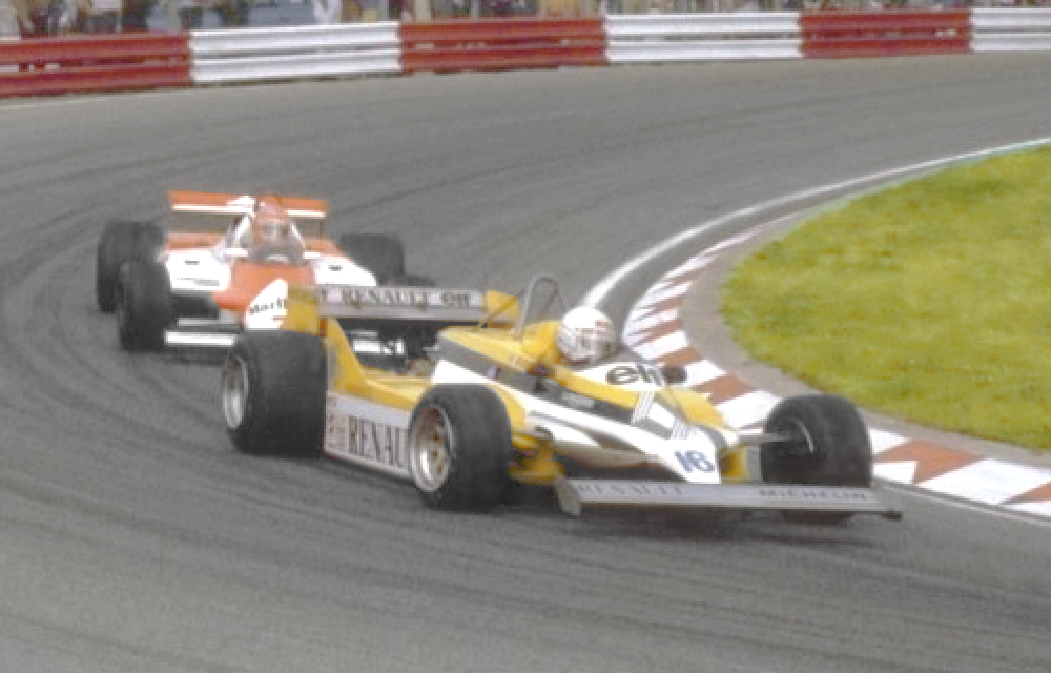
Renault placed third in the Constructors' Championship with the RE30.

The 1981 FIA Formula One World Championship was the 35th season of FIA Formula One motor racing. It featured the 1981 Formula One World Championship for Drivers and the 1981 Formula One World Championship for Manufacturers, which were contested over a fifteen-race series that commenced on 15 March and ended on 17 October. The 1981 South African Grand Prix, as a non-championship race due to difficulties from the ongoing FISA–FOCA war, was open to Formula One entrants but was not part of the World Championship.

The 1981 championship was the first to be run under the FIA Formula One World Championship name, replacing both the original World Championship of Drivers and International Cup for Constructors. Under the influence of Brabham team owner Bernie Ecclestone and the FOCA organisation, teams were asked to sign the first Concorde Agreement, which would set Formula One on course to become a profitable business. The agreement required teams to lodge entries for the entire championship rather than individual races, while the FIA would also set the prize money. A standardised set of rules would be in place at every race and, from 1982 on, the entrants had to own the intellectual rights to the chassis that they entered, as such the distinction between the terms "entrant" and "constructor", and hence also "team", have become less pronounced. (Note: The Equipe Banco Occidental team became the last privateer team to have entered the Williams car for a race alongside the Williams works team at the 1981 Spanish Grand Prix, but eventually withdrew before the practice and qualifying.)

Nelson Piquet won the Drivers' Championship, claiming the first of his three drivers' titles, while Williams won the Constructors' Championship for the second consecutive year.

== Drivers and constructors ==
Avon and Pirelli entered the sport as tyre manufacturers.

The following teams and drivers contested the 1981 FIA Formula One World Championship:

Entrant	Constructor	Chassis	Engine	Tyres	No	Driver	Rounds
(United Kingdom) Albilad Williams Racing Team (United Kingdom) TAG Williams Team	Williams-Ford	FW07C	Ford Cosworth DFV 3.0 V8	M G	1	(Australia) Alan Jones	All
(United Kingdom) Albilad Williams Racing Team (United Kingdom) TAG Williams Team	Williams-Ford	FW07C	Ford Cosworth DFV 3.0 V8	M G	2	(Argentina) Carlos Reutemann	All
(United Kingdom) Tyrrell Racing Team	Tyrrell-Ford	010; 011	Ford Cosworth DFV 3.0 V8	M A	3	(United States) Eddie Cheever	All
(United Kingdom) Tyrrell Racing Team	Tyrrell-Ford	010; 011	Ford Cosworth DFV 3.0 V8	M A	4	(United States) Kevin Cogan	1
(United Kingdom) Tyrrell Racing Team	Tyrrell-Ford	010; 011	Ford Cosworth DFV 3.0 V8	M A	4	(Argentina) Ricardo Zunino	2–3
(United Kingdom) Tyrrell Racing Team	Tyrrell-Ford	010; 011	Ford Cosworth DFV 3.0 V8	M A	4	(Italy) Michele Alboreto	4–15
(United Kingdom) Parmalat Racing	Brabham-Ford	BT49C	Ford Cosworth DFV 3.0 V8	M G	5	(Brazil) Nelson Piquet	All
(United Kingdom) Parmalat Racing	Brabham-Ford	BT49C	Ford Cosworth DFV 3.0 V8	M G	6	(Mexico) Héctor Rebaque	All
(United Kingdom) Marlboro McLaren International	McLaren-Ford	M29F; MP4/1	Ford Cosworth DFV 3.0 V8	M	7	(United Kingdom) John Watson	All
(United Kingdom) Marlboro McLaren International	McLaren-Ford	M29F; MP4/1	Ford Cosworth DFV 3.0 V8	M	8	(Italy) Andrea de Cesaris	All
(West Germany) Team ATS	ATS-Ford	D4; HGS1	Ford Cosworth DFV 3.0 V8	M A	9	(Netherlands) Jan Lammers	1–4
(West Germany) Team ATS	ATS-Ford	D4; HGS1	Ford Cosworth DFV 3.0 V8	M A	9	(Sweden) Slim Borgudd	5, 7–15
(West Germany) Team ATS	ATS-Ford	D4; HGS1	Ford Cosworth DFV 3.0 V8	M A	10	(Sweden) Slim Borgudd	4, 6
(United Kingdom) Team Essex Lotus (United Kingdom) John Player Team Lotus	Lotus-Ford	81B; 87; 88; 88B	Ford Cosworth DFV 3.0 V8	M G	11	(Italy) Elio de Angelis	1–3, 5–15
(United Kingdom) Team Essex Lotus (United Kingdom) John Player Team Lotus	Lotus-Ford	81B; 87; 88; 88B	Ford Cosworth DFV 3.0 V8	M G	12	(United Kingdom) Nigel Mansell	1–3, 5–15
(United Kingdom) Ensign Racing	Ensign-Ford	N180B	Ford Cosworth DFV 3.0 V8	M A	14	(Switzerland) Marc Surer	1–6
(United Kingdom) Ensign Racing	Ensign-Ford	N180B	Ford Cosworth DFV 3.0 V8	M A	14	(Colombia) Ricardo Londoño	2
(United Kingdom) Ensign Racing	Ensign-Ford	N180B	Ford Cosworth DFV 3.0 V8	M A	14	(Chile) Eliseo Salazar	7–15
(France) Équipe Renault Elf	Renault	RE20B; RE30	Renault-Gordini EF1 1.5 V6t	M	15	(France) Alain Prost	All
(France) Équipe Renault Elf	Renault	RE20B; RE30	Renault-Gordini EF1 1.5 V6t	M	16	(France) René Arnoux	All
(United Kingdom) March Grand Prix Team (United Kingdom) Guinness RIzla+. March	March-Ford	811	Ford Cosworth DFV 3.0 V8	M A	17	(Republic of Ireland) Derek Daly	1–3, 7–15
(United Kingdom) March Grand Prix Team (United Kingdom) Guinness RIzla+. March	March-Ford	811	Ford Cosworth DFV 3.0 V8	M A	17	(Chile) Eliseo Salazar	4–6
(United Kingdom) March Grand Prix Team (United Kingdom) Guinness RIzla+. March	March-Ford	811	Ford Cosworth DFV 3.0 V8	M A	18	(Chile) Eliseo Salazar	1–3
(United Kingdom) March Grand Prix Team (United Kingdom) Guinness RIzla+. March	March-Ford	811	Ford Cosworth DFV 3.0 V8	M A	18	(Republic of Ireland) Derek Daly	4–6
(Brazil) Fittipaldi Automotive	Fittipaldi-Ford	F8C	Ford Cosworth DFV 3.0 V8	M A P	20	(Finland) Keke Rosberg	1–10, 12–15
(Brazil) Fittipaldi Automotive	Fittipaldi-Ford	F8C	Ford Cosworth DFV 3.0 V8	M A P	21	(Brazil) Chico Serra	1–10, 12–15
(Italy) Marlboro Team Alfa Romeo	Alfa Romeo	179B; 179C; 179D	Alfa Romeo 1260 3.0 V12	M	22	(United States) Mario Andretti	All
(Italy) Marlboro Team Alfa Romeo	Alfa Romeo	179B; 179C; 179D	Alfa Romeo 1260 3.0 V12	M	23	(Italy) Bruno Giacomelli	All
(France) Équipe Talbot Gitanes	Talbot Ligier-Matra	JS17	Matra MS81 3.0 V12	M	25	(France) Jean-Pierre Jarier	1–2
(France) Équipe Talbot Gitanes	Talbot Ligier-Matra	JS17	Matra MS81 3.0 V12	M	25	(France) Jean-Pierre Jabouille	2–7
(France) Équipe Talbot Gitanes	Talbot Ligier-Matra	JS17	Matra MS81 3.0 V12	M	25	(France) Patrick Tambay	8–15
(France) Équipe Talbot Gitanes	Talbot Ligier-Matra	JS17	Matra MS81 3.0 V12	M	26	(France) Jacques Laffite	All
(Italy) Ferrari	Ferrari	126CK	Ferrari 021 1.5 V6t	M	27	(Canada) Gilles Villeneuve	All
(Italy) Ferrari	Ferrari	126CK	Ferrari 021 1.5 V6t	M	28	(France) Didier Pironi	All
(United Kingdom) Ragno Arrows Beta Racing Team	Arrows-Ford	A3	Ford Cosworth DFV 3.0 V8	M P	29	(Italy) Riccardo Patrese	All
(United Kingdom) Ragno Arrows Beta Racing Team	Arrows-Ford	A3	Ford Cosworth DFV 3.0 V8	M P	30	(Italy) Siegfried Stohr	1–13
(United Kingdom) Ragno Arrows Beta Racing Team	Arrows-Ford	A3	Ford Cosworth DFV 3.0 V8	M P	30	(Canada) Jacques Villeneuve Sr.	14–15
(Italy) Denim Osella	Osella-Ford	FA1B; FA1C	Ford Cosworth DFV 3.0 V8	M	31	(Argentina) Miguel Ángel Guerra	1–4
(Italy) Denim Osella	Osella-Ford	FA1B; FA1C	Ford Cosworth DFV 3.0 V8	M	31	(Italy) Piercarlo Ghinzani	5
(Italy) Denim Osella	Osella-Ford	FA1B; FA1C	Ford Cosworth DFV 3.0 V8	M	31	(Italy) Beppe Gabbiani	6–15
(Italy) Denim Osella	Osella-Ford	FA1B; FA1C	Ford Cosworth DFV 3.0 V8	M	32	(Italy) Beppe Gabbiani	1–5
(Italy) Denim Osella	Osella-Ford	FA1B; FA1C	Ford Cosworth DFV 3.0 V8	M	32	(Italy) Piercarlo Ghinzani	6
(Italy) Denim Osella	Osella-Ford	FA1B; FA1C	Ford Cosworth DFV 3.0 V8	M	32	(Italy) Giorgio Francia	7
(Italy) Denim Osella	Osella-Ford	FA1B; FA1C	Ford Cosworth DFV 3.0 V8	M	32	(France) Jean-Pierre Jarier	9–15
(Hong Kong) Theodore Racing Team	Theodore-Ford	TY01	Ford Cosworth DFV 3.0 V8	M A	33	(France) Patrick Tambay	1–7
(Hong Kong) Theodore Racing Team	Theodore-Ford	TY01	Ford Cosworth DFV 3.0 V8	M A	33	(Switzerland) Marc Surer	8–15
(United Kingdom) Candy Toleman Motorsport	Toleman-Hart	TG181	Hart 415T 1.5 L4t	P	35	(United Kingdom) Brian Henton	4–15
(United Kingdom) Candy Toleman Motorsport	Toleman-Hart	TG181	Hart 415T 1.5 L4t	P	36	(United Kingdom) Derek Warwick	4–15
(Spain) Equipe Banco Occidental	Williams-Ford	FW07	Ford Cosworth DFV 3.0 V8	M	37	(Spain) Emilio de Villota	7

=== Team changes ===
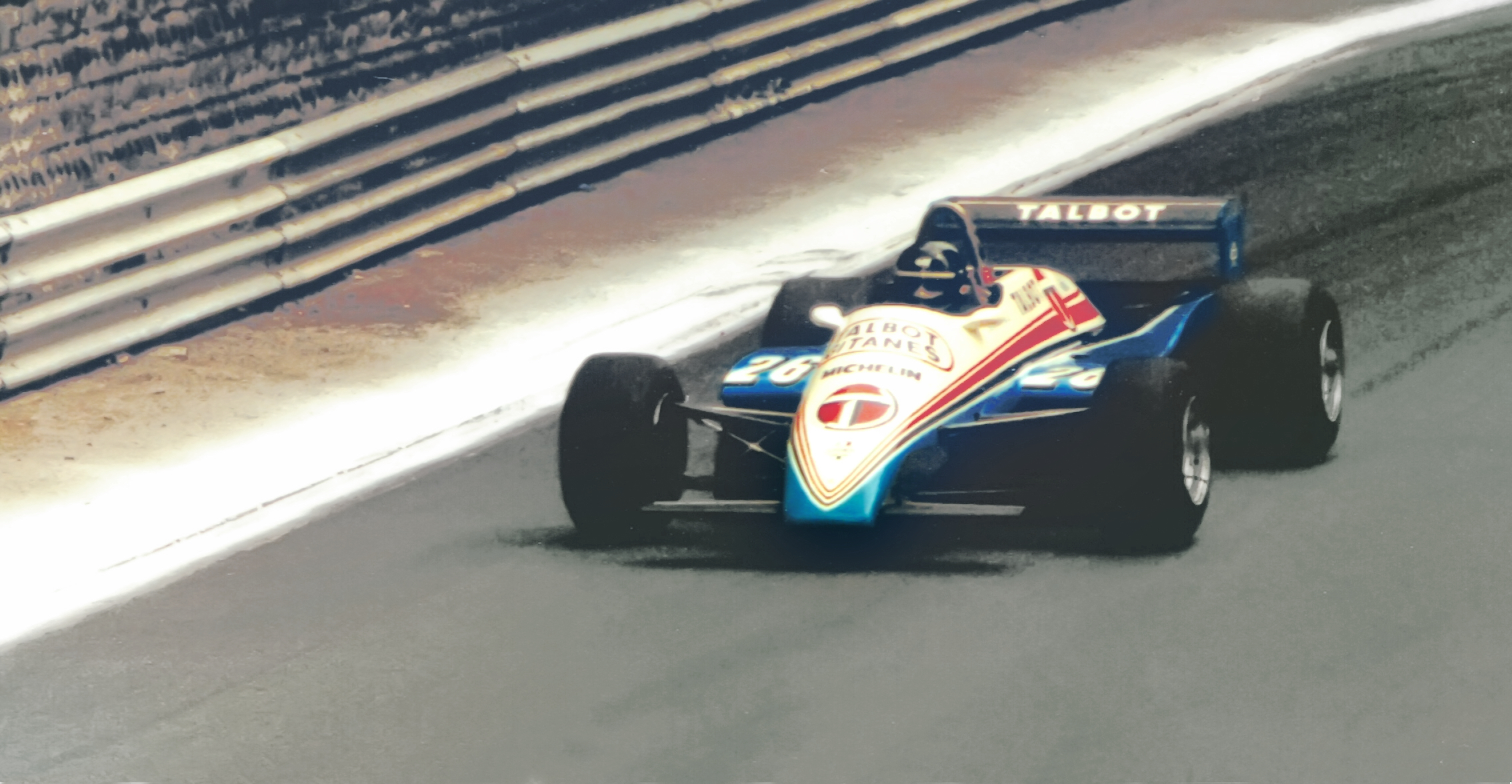
During the 1981–82 seasons, Ligier were sponsored by Talbot.

- After the Shadow team had been absorbed into Theodore Racing halfway through the 1980 season. Theodore entered this season with their own chassis and the Shadow name disappeared.
- In 1980, RAM Racing had raced with a customer Williams chassis, but they did not enter the 1981 season. March Engineering, however, used that chassis to make a return to Formula 1. (In 1983, RAM would return to take over from March.)
- After finishing 1–2 in the 1980 European Formula Two Championship, Toleman entered Formula 1. Discussions took place with Lancia as possible engine supplier, the team decided to use a turbocharged version of the Hart F2 engine. It made them one of the early adopters on the trend towards turbocharged cars, but their first chassis was overweight and underpowered.
- Ligier had acquired substantial sponsorship from Talbot and other public French companies. Talbot supplied Matra V12 engines.

=== Driver changes ===
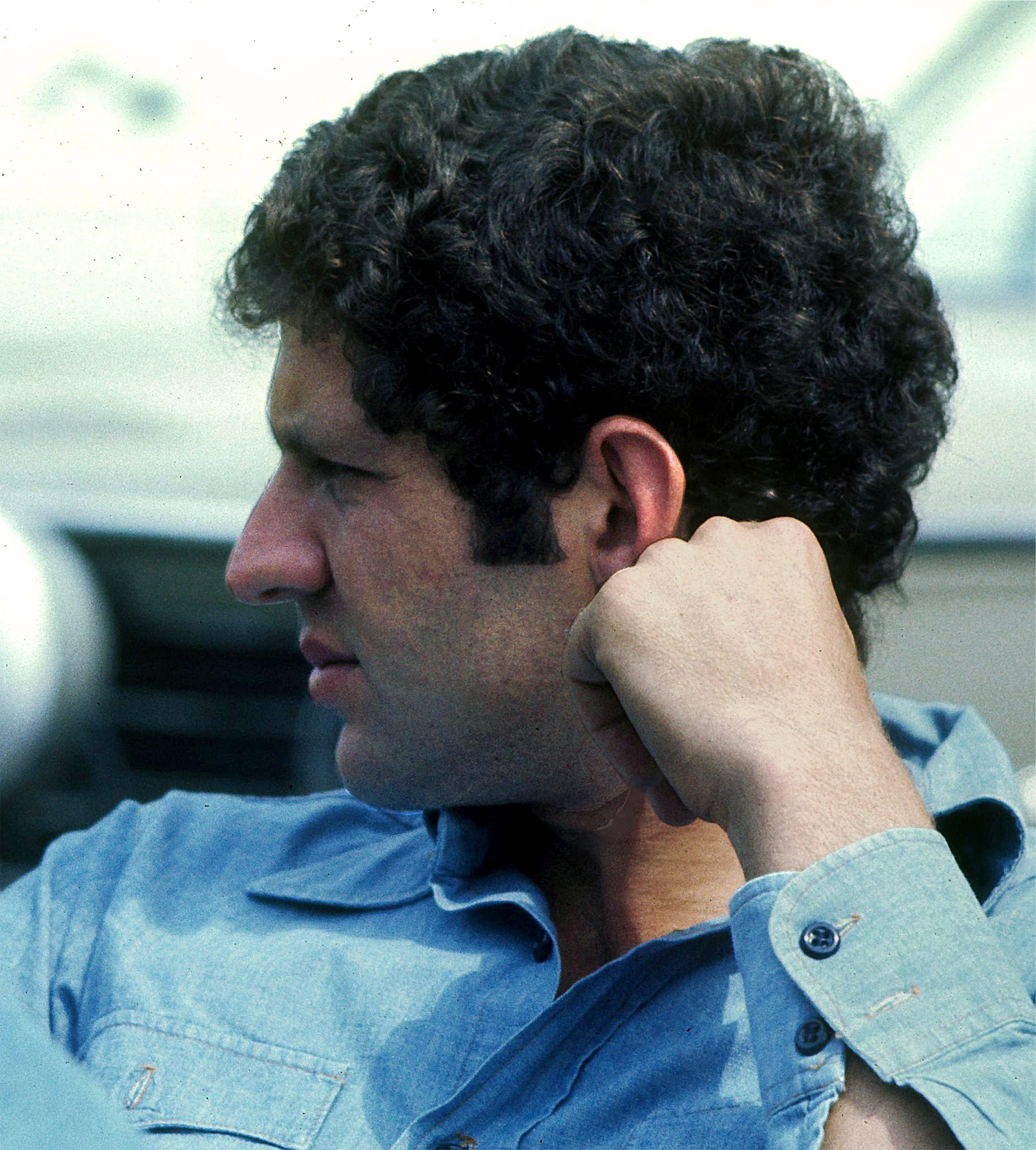
1979 World Champion Jody Scheckter had retired after last season.

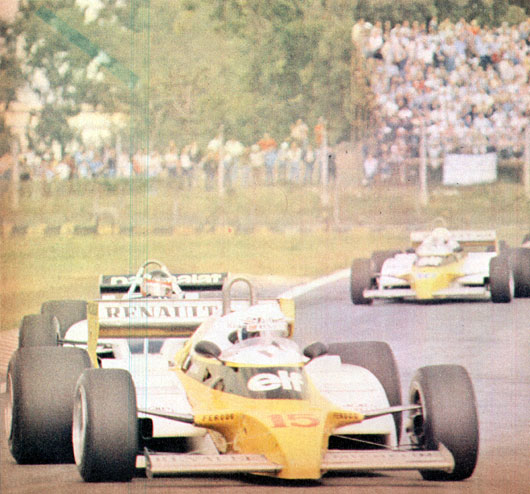
Alain Prost had moved to Renault.

There had been a lot of change over the winter:

- Ligier had lost Didier Pironi to Ferrari, where 1979 World Champion Jody Scheckter had retired. They hired Jean-Pierre Jabouille from Renault, but when the season started, he was still recovering from his leg injuries sustained in the 1980 Canadian Grand Prix. Jean-Pierre Jarier had left the team, but acted as his stand-in for the first two races of the 1981 season.
- Renault managed to sign Alain Prost, despite his two-year contract with McLaren, so the British team had to scramble for a new driver. Main sponsor Marlboro suggested Andrea de Cesaris from Alfa Romeo when he had to move for 1978 World Champion Mario Andretti. The American had spent five years with Lotus. Nigel Mansell was promoted to a full-season drive with the Lotus team.
- Tyrrell had lost both of its 1980 drivers and so hired Eddie Cheever from Osella and an inexperienced Kevin Cogan.
- Another ten driver changes happened in the lower-ranking teams.

==== Mid-season changes ====
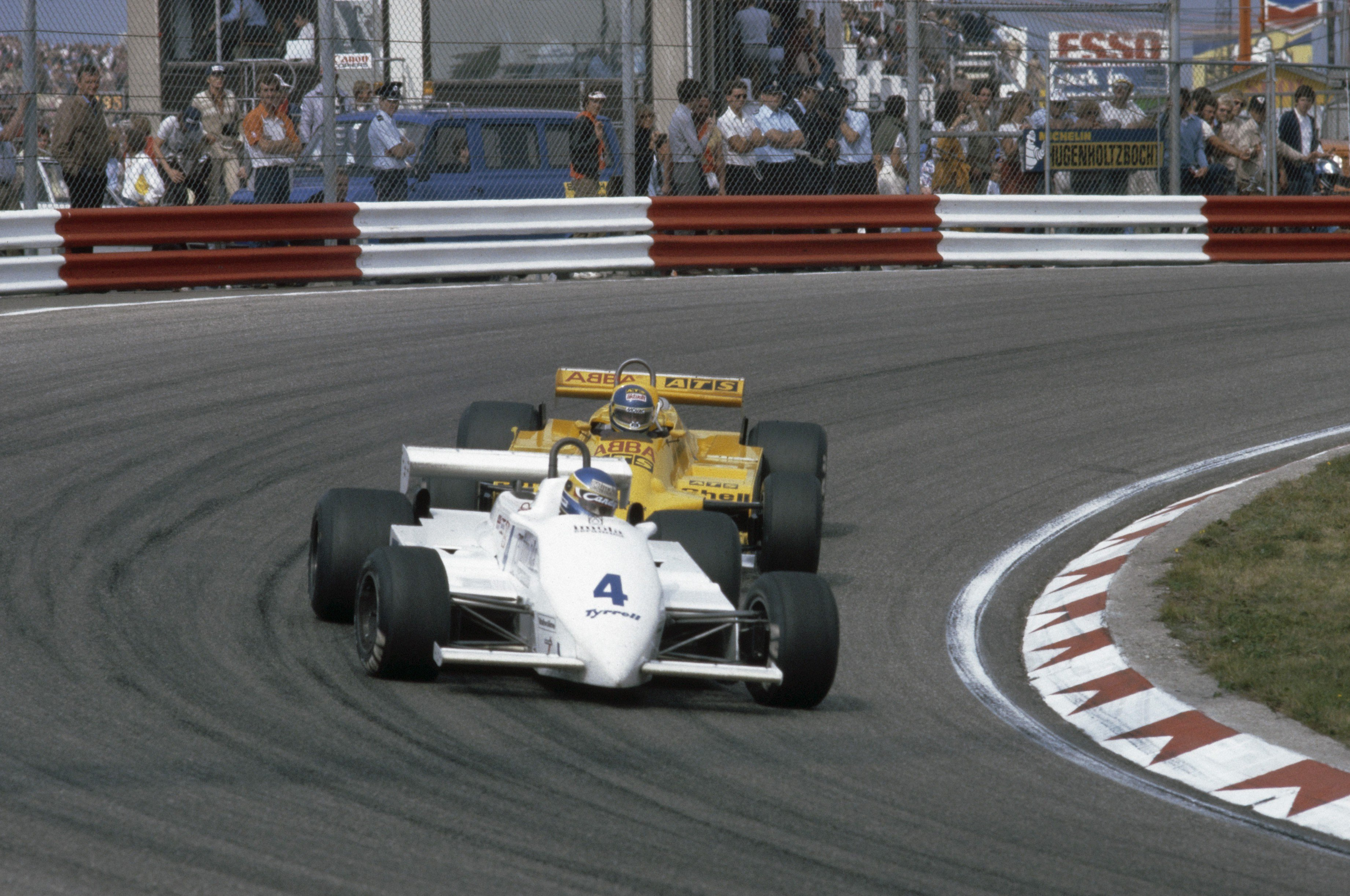
Michele Alboreto (front) and Slim Borgudd (back) both debuted in the 1981 San Marino Grand Prix (Picture from Dutch Grand Prix).

- Kevin Cogan did not manage to qualify for the opening race and was sacked by the Tyrrell team. It was Cogan's last F1 outing. He was replaced by Ricardo Zunino, who had spent the first half of 1980 driving for Brabham. After two races, however, Zunino was moved aside for sportscar driver Michele Alboreto.
- During the first lap of the San Marino Grand Prix, Osella driver Miguel Ángel Guerra was hit by Eliseo Salazar, crashed into a wall and suffered a broken wrist and ankle. Piercarlo Ghinzani made his debut to replace the Argentinian. Later, Giorgio Francia took over for one race, and Jean-Pierre Jarier finished the season, looking forward to a full-season drive in 1982.
- From the Belgian Grand Prix on, Jan Lammers had to give up his seat for Slim Borgudd, the drummer for ABBA. There was no cash sponsorship, but the world famous band's logo on the car's sidepods was a hopeful move by the ATS team to attract other investors.
- Before the Spanish Grand Prix, Eliseo Salazar moved from March to Ensign, replacing Marc Surer. The Swiss driver moved to Theodore, from where Patrick Tambay moved to Ligier. Their driver Jean-Pierre Jabouille retired from F1, concluding he could not fully recover from last year's leg injuries.
- For the last two races of the season, Jacques Villeneuve Sr. (brother of Gilles and uncle to Jacques Jr.) made his F1 debut with Arrows. Their driver Siegfried Stohr was traumatised by the start-line accident at the Belgian Grand Prix and decided to retire to start a racing school and safe driving academy.

== Calendar ==
The championship was contested over the following fifteen races:

Round	Grand Prix	Circuit	Date
1	United States Grand Prix West	(United States) Long Beach Street Circuit, California	15 March
2	Brazilian Grand Prix	(Brazil) Autódromo de Jacarepaguá, Rio de Janeiro	29 March
3	Argentine Grand Prix	(Argentina) Autodromo de Buenos Aires, Buenos Aires	12 April
4	San Marino Grand Prix	(Italy) Autodromo Dino Ferrari, Imola	3 May
5	Belgian Grand Prix	(Belgium) Circuit Zolder, Heusden-Zolder	17 May
6	Monaco Grand Prix	Circuit de Monaco, Monte Carlo	31 May
7	Spanish Grand Prix	(Spain) Circuito Permanente del Jarama, Madrid	21 June
8	French Grand Prix	(France) Dijon-Prenois, Prenois	5 July
9	British Grand Prix	(United Kingdom) Silverstone Circuit, Silverstone	18 July
10	German Grand Prix	(West Germany) Hockenheimring, Hockenheim	2 August
11	Austrian Grand Prix	(Austria) Österreichring, Spielberg	16 August
12	Dutch Grand Prix	(Netherlands) Circuit Park Zandvoort, Zandvoort	30 August
13	Italian Grand Prix	(Italy) Autodromo Nazionale di Monza, Monza	13 September
14	Canadian Grand Prix	(Canada) Île Notre-Dame Circuit, Montréal	27 September
15	Caesars Palace Grand Prix (Note: Saturday race)	(United States) Caesars Palace Grand Prix Circuit, Las Vegas	17 October (Note: The Caesars Palace Grand Prix was not on the original 1981 Formula One Calendar, but it would be added into the calendar on the date of 17 October as a replacement for the United States Grand Prix, which was scheduled for 4 October but cancelled due to the financial difficulties Watkins Glen International was facing.)

The following races were included on the original calendar but were cancelled:

Grand Prix	Circuit	Scheduled date
South African Grand Prix	(South Africa) Kyalami Grand Prix Circuit, Midrand	7 February
United States Grand Prix	(United States) Watkins Glen Grand Prix Course, New York	4 October

=== Calendar changes ===
- The South African Grand Prix at Kyalami was going to be the season opener on 7 February, but difficulties from the ongoing FISA–FOCA war led to the event being run as a non-championship race. It was contested only by the Ford-Cosworth powered teams, all running cars with aerodynamic devices which were banned for the 1981 championship season.
- The race at Long Beach was the official championship opener after the Argentine and Brazilian Grand Prix had been moved back to March/April. The Brazilian race was also moved from the Interlagos to Jacarepaguá due to a long list of safety issues.
- The Italian Grand Prix was back at Autodromo Nazionale di Monza after a year's absence. The circuit underwent major upgrades including a new pit building. The Autodromo Dino Ferrari also hosted a race, which would be dubbed the San Marino Grand Prix.
- The Spanish Grand Prix returned as a championship round after the 1980 edition had been excluded.
- In keeping with the event-sharing arrangement between the two circuits, the French Grand Prix was moved from Paul Ricard Circuit to Dijon-Prenois. Likewise, the British Grand Prix was moved from Brands Hatch to Silverstone.
- The United States Grand Prix at Watkins Glen was originally scheduled for 4 October, but was cancelled due to the hosts' financial difficulties. It was replaced by the Caesars Palace Grand Prix, held in the Caesars Palace car park.

== Regulation changes ==
=== Technical regulations ===
- For the first time, the survival cell was treated as an entity and an integral part of an F1 car. It had to extend in front of the driver's feet and wholly reinforced.
- The minimum weight of the car was raised from 575 kg (1,268 lb) to 585 kg (1,290 lb).

=== Sporting and event regulations ===
- Tyre barriers were installed at certain tracks for the first time.
- All pit lanes had to have a minimum width of 10 m (33 ft).
- At the start of the race, drivers were placed on the grid in a 1x1x1 fashion, instead of a staggered 2x2 pattern.

== Season report ==
=== Non-championship race: South Africa ===
The South African Grand Prix, held on 7 February at the Kyalami Circuit near Johannesburg, was originally supposed to be the first round of the 1981 Formula One World Championship – but it was eventually stripped of its championship status. The ongoing FISA–FOCA war resulted in Fédération Internationale du Sport Automobile (FISA) insisting on a date change which was not acceptable to the race organisers. Approval was ultimately given for the race to go ahead on its original date but as a Formula Libre race rather than as a round of the Formula One World Championship. The downgraded race was supported by the Formula One Constructors Association (FOCA) aligned teams but not by Ferrari, Ligier, Osella, Renault, or Alfa Romeo, whose allegiances lay with FISA. This race was run with the cars running in 1980-specification trim, with the ground-effect wing cars of the time, equipped with sliding skirts that increased their downforce by ensuring the air under the car did not escape from under the car, where the most important airflow was.

In qualifying, it was once again a major battle between the major players of 1980. The Brabham of Nelson Piquet battled the two Williams cars of Alan Jones and Carlos Reutemann for pole position. Piquet took pole, with Reutemann in second. Reutemann had a close call when in the closing minutes of the session, his Williams spun off and went into the catch fencing. The fencing had wrapped around his windpipe and had begun to strangle Reutemann, and the hapless Argentine was unable to remove the catchfencing on his own. It was only the quick mobilisation of the marshals that were able to rescue Reutemann from what could have quite easily have been his death. Following Reutemann was Jones, Keke Rosberg in the Fittipaldi, Elio de Angelis (Lotus), Riccardo Patrese (Arrows), Ricardo Zunino (Brabham), Nigel Mansell (Lotus) and Andrea de Cesaris (McLaren).

The race was held in quite wet conditions, however the rain had abated shortly before the start of the grand prix. Notably, only Carlos Reutemann from second on the grid and Keke Rosberg in fourth on the grid who went for slicks, everyone else would choose wet weather tyres. Unsurprisingly, Reutemann and Rosberg made poor starts in the still wet conditions. Piquet maintained his lead as Reutemann dropped behind Elio de Angelis and the fast starting Jan Lammers who had come up from tenth on the grid. Lammers was running well behind De Angelis before he went for the overtake on the second lap. Lammers lost control in the wet conditions and tapped the rear of De Angelis where he spun wide into the gravel trap. He dropped right down to the back of the field where he would go on to retire later in the race with brake fade. Nigel Mansell had made a storming start, moving into fourth place with John Watson right behind him. The reigning champion Alan Jones had dropped down to sixth after a poor start to the race. Derek Daly had also done well to climb up to seventh on March's return to F1. On lap 4, both Mansell and Watson moved ahead of Reutemann. A three-way battle for second place then followed with De Angelis, Mansell and Watson. Lap 5 saw Watson move ahead of Mansell, the following lap he moved ahead of the other Lotus of De Angelis. Alan Jones then began a comeback drive, moving ahead of Reutemann and Mansell. On lap 11, Geoff Lees spun off the circuit in his Theodore, Lees unluckily went through the catchfencing and was hit on the head by one of the catchfencing poles. Lees had to be lifted out of the car by the marshalls as he had been briefly knocked unconscious by the pole. The track had then begun to dry, Alan Jones was the first driver to come into slicks with Nigel Mansell following suit, despite having spun on the previous lap. Jones having aquaplaned off the circuit on his out-lap damaged the rear of his car. Jones returned to the pits as his mechanics were forced to repair his rear wing. Jones would later retire with a loose skirt. By this time, only Piquet and Watson were the only front runners not to have pitted. Piquet pitted for new tyres, allowing Watson to take the lead of the race. Watson then followed Piquet into the pits the following lap. Reutemann inherited a comfortable lead; his gamble of racing with dry tyres since the start of the race had paid off. Female racer Desiré Wilson retired on lap 51 when she spun her Tyrrell off the circuit. Reutemann took a comfortable win, 20 seconds ahead of Piquet and ahead of De Angelis, Rosberg and John Watson in a McLaren.

=== Race 1: United States West ===
The first of two rounds in the United States of America started a trilogy of F1 races in the Americas on March 15 at the Long Beach street circuit in southern California, just outside the sprawling metropolis of Los Angeles. Goodyear had decided to withdraw from F1 leaving everyone on Michelin tyres, and the cars were now running in new 1981-specification cars, with the sliding skirts now banned and cars required to have a 6 cm ground clearance in order to reduce downforce. Qualifying resulted in something of a surprise with Patrese on pole in the Arrows with Jones and Reutemann behind him. Piquet was fourth with Villeneuve fifth, home favorite Andretti sixth and Mansell seventh. The top 10 was completed by Cheever, Giacomelli (Alfa Romeo) and Jarier. The circuit had been slightly modified with the second left hander on Pine Avenue made one fluid corner instead of two apexes.

Raceday had typically perfect Long Beach weather, and at the start Villeneuve made an amazing start and charged down to the first corner, Queen's Hairpin, so quickly that he overshot, with Patrese going into the lead with Jones and Reutemann chasing. In the middle of the pack, Prost and de Cesaris collided and both went out. Pironi made a remarkable start to go from 11th on the grid to fourth, ahead of Piquet, the recovering Villeneuve, Cheever and Andretti. On the second lap Reutemann overtook Jones for second but otherwise the top six remained unchanged until lap 17, when Pironi was able to pass Piquet for fourth, but on the next lap Villeneuve's Ferrari stopped with a driveshaft failure and so Cheever moved to sixth place. On lap 25 Patrese began to suffer from fuel pressure problems and lost the lead to Reutemann. Patrese soon headed for the pits, everyone moving up a place including Andretti, who took over sixth place. As Jones closed up on Reutemann, the Argentine driver made a mistake on Pine Avenue as he lapped Surer, going wide and Jones going ahead. On the same lap, Laffite overtook Andretti for sixth place and chased after Cheever. The two cars collided on lap 41 on Ocean Boulevard and Laffite ended up in the pits. As Cheever began to drop back, Andretti was able to climb to fifth place and on lap 54 that became fourth when Pironi slowed with an oil leak. Jones thus led another Williams 1–2 with Piquet third, Andretti fourth, Cheever fifth and Tambay sixth in the Theodore.

=== Race 2: Brazil ===
The Formula One circus moved from North to South America to start a two-stop tour there. The first round was at the Jacarepagua Autodrome in Rio de Janeiro – only the second time F1 had been there. F1 had previously visited the 5-mile Interlagos circuit in São Paulo from 1972 to 1980; this circuit was effectively dropped after 1980 because of safety issues with the circuit and the growing slums around the circuit being at odds with Formula One's glamorous image. Tyrrell rented its second car to Zunino but otherwise the field was exactly the same, although the new carbon-fibre McLaren MP4/1 which had been seen in Long Beach was not taken to South America. Jean-Pierre Jabouille tried to qualify the Talbot Ligier, but his legs were clearly not well enough healed from his accident in Montreal six months earlier; the car was handed over to Jean-Pierre Jarier again. Lotus again ran into trouble with the twin-chassised Lotus 88 and there were murmurs about a new hydro-pneumatic suspension on the Brabhams which enabled the cars to be 6 cm off the ground when they were measured but much closer to the ground when they were out on the track. Pole position went to local hero Piquet in his Brabham with the two Williams cars of Reutemann and Jones behind him. Fourth was Patrese in the impressive Arrows while Prost put his Renault fifth ahead of Bruno Giacomelli's Alfa Romeo, Villeneuve's Ferrari 126CK, the second Renault of Rene Arnoux, Andretti's Alfa Romeo and the Lotus 81B of de Angelis.

It was wet on race morning and the start took place with the track damp but the rain holding off. Piquet decided to go on slick tyres (but everyone else except Didier Pironi and Siegfried Stohr decided to use wets). Prost made a bad start and this caused the fast-starting Villeneuve to have to lift off. Andretti hit the rear of Villeneuve and went over the Ferrari. Behind them Arnoux, Eddie Cheever, Stohr and Chico Serra were all involved. At the front Reutemann went into the lead with Jones, Patrese, Giacomelli, de Angelis and the rest in pursuit. In the early laps de Angelis overtook Giacomelli to take fourth place and when Giacomelli spun off fifth place went to Keke Rosberg's Fittipaldi. John Watson made good progress from a poor grid position and on lap 14 he overtook Rosberg for fourth. The Finn then dropped behind Jean-Pierre Jarier (Talbot Ligier) as well. The order at the front remained unchanged until lap 29 when Jarier went wide and dropped behind Marc Surer (Ensign) and Jacques Laffite (Talbot Ligier). On lap 35 Watson spun as the rain increased and so Surer moved to fifth with Laffite sixth. Surer's remarkable run went on, and on lap 49 he overtook de Angelis for fourth place while behind him Jarier repassed Laffite for sixth.

In the closing laps the two Talbot Ligiers switched positions again (Jarier being told to drop back by the team), while Jones waited for Reutemann to move aside as the World Champion was the team's number one. Reutemann did not budge. The team showed pitboards (displaying the names "JONES-REUT") indicating that Reutemann should move over but he did not. Everyone thought he would be waiting for the last lap but Reutemann took the flag first. Jones was furious and did not take part in the podium ceremony. Patrese finished third with the remarkable Surer fourth ahead of de Angelis. The Talbot Ligiers followed, with Laffite ahead, taking home the last point.

=== Race 3: Argentina ===
The other half of the South American tour in Reutemann's home country of Argentina was usually held in January; this time it was in the cooler weather of April. Reutemann's decision to disobey team orders in Brazil energized the Argentine fans (who displayed mock-ups of the Williams pit board, but switching the names to "REUT-JONES") but had split loyalties amongst the Williams team. The Lotus 88 was once again banned. Team boss Colin Chapman was so incensed by the decision that he left before practice even began. There was also a dispute over Brabham's new hydro-pneumatic suspension which was designed to overcome the regulation which meant cars had to run with 6 cm of ground clearance; whenever the Brabham was measured it was 6 cm above the ground. The entry list was the same as in Brazil except that Jabouille was back in the Talbot Ligier. He failed to qualify. Also missing out were the two Osellas and Eliseo Salazar's March. Thanks to his hydro-pneumatic suspension system Piquet was on pole position with Alain Prost second quickest in the Renault. Then came Jones and Reutemann, Rene Arnoux in the second Renault and Hector Rebaque in the second Brabham. The top 10 was completed by Gilles Villeneuve (Ferrari), Keke Rosberg (Fittipaldi), Riccardo Patrese (Arrows) and Elio de Angelis in the Lotus.

Raceday came about, and at this varied circuit located in the Argentine capital of Buenos Aires, Jones took the lead at the start, but Piquet got ahead in the course of the first lap by driving around the outside of Jones in one of the corners and he then drove away from the field. He ended the race over 25 seconds ahead. In the course of the second lap Reutemann overtook Jones and the Australian would later drop behind Prost and Rebaque as well. Rebaque's Brabham was handling well and so he was able to get ahead of the Renault on lap 11 and soon after he got past Reutemann, so for the middle part of the race the Brabhams were running in 1-2 formation. On lap 33, however, the Mexican disappeared with a distributor problem. This put Reutemann back into second place with Prost third and Jones fourth. Arnoux finished fifth while the final point went to de Angelis after a fight with Patrese and Patrick Tambay (Theodore).

Due to internal politics and the drivers' strike at the 1982 South African Grand Prix, the Argentine GP would not return to the calendar until 1995.

=== Race 4: San Marino (Imola, Italy) ===
Three weeks later, the GP circus returned to Europe to start the 4 month long tour there. The first race was a new race – a second Italian race called the San Marino Grand Prix at the Autodromo Dino Ferrari near Imola, just outside Bologna and 50 miles west of the tiny principality of San Marino. Team Lotus had decided to miss the race but in England a new Lotus 87 was being tested to replace the banned twin-chassis Lotus 88. The controversy over hydro-pneumatic suspensions had also faded as all the cars now had systems fitted. The big excitement in the paddock was the appearance of the new Toleman F1 team, complete with a Brian Hart turbo engine and Pirelli tyres. Neither Brian Henton nor Derek Warwick qualified. Otherwise the entry list was little changed, although Tyrrell had replaced Ricardo Zunino with a rising star called Michele Alboreto who brought much-needed backing for the team from a local ceramics company. News had emerged on Friday that the United States Grand Prix at Watkins Glen had been cancelled, although this was seen as predictable, given the historic circuit's financial troubles. Qualifying resulted in a popular pole position for Gilles Villeneuve in the turbocharged Ferrari. The Canadian was seven-tenths ahead of Carlos Reutemann's Williams while the Renaults of Rene Arnoux and Alain Prost filled the second row. Nelson Piquet was fifth and Ferrari's Didier Pironi sixth while the top 10 was completed by John Watson (in the new McLaren MP4/1 - being raced for the first time), Jones, Patrese, and Laffite.

The track was wet at the start and everyone was on wet tyres. This race turned out to be an exciting affair as Villeneuve went into the lead while Pironi was able to use the prodigious power of the Ferrari to blast his way up to second position. At the back of the field there was a nasty accident when F1 debutante Miguel Angel Guerra had a moment in Tosa corner and was then hit by Eliseo Salazar's March. This punted the Osella into the barrier at high speed and the Argentine driver had to be cut from the wreck with serious leg injuries. While Guerra was being released from his car the two Ferraris ran away from the rest of the field with Reutemann third, having driven into his teammate Jones to stop the Australian taking third on the first lap. This had damaged Jones's front wing and he was soon in the pits for repairs. That put Patrese up to fourth place and he overtook Reutemann a few laps later as the Argentine went off over the grass at the final chicane. Piquet and his Brabham teammate Hector Rebaque completed the top six after Laffite and Arnoux had collided. On lap 14 Villeneuve went into the pits for slicks. As he accelerated away it started to rain again and so two laps later Villeneuve was back in pitlane for wet tyres. Pironi led with Patrese second while Piquet moved to third ahead of Reutemann. The Brazilian later got ahead of Patrese as well, and then started to race hard with Pironi. The top five remained unchanged until the 47th lap when Piquet finally overtook Pironi, the Ferrari having damaged a skirt early on. Pironi drifted back behind Patrese, Reutemann and Rebaque but he finished fifth, just ahead of Andrea de Cesaris's McLaren.

=== Race 5: Belgium ===
In stark contrast to San Marino, the Belgian Grand Prix at Zolder was a shambolic event filled with tragedies and frustration. Politics dominated this event; Gordon Murray's hydraulic suspension gave his Brabhams a considerable performance advantage, and the teams had been heavily protesting the system's legality within the revised rules for the season. The political bickering over the Concorde Agreement meant that with 32 entries, there were too many cars and pressure was applied to ATS and Theodore to withdraw. ATS withdrew Jan Lammers but ran its second car for Slim Borgudd while Patrick Tambay was left without a drive. The Osella team had Piercarlo Ghinzani driving in place of the injured Miguel Angel Guerra. But the tragedy started with Carlos Reutemann accidentally running over an Osella mechanic, Giovanni Amadeo, who died of a fractured skull the Monday after the race. This accident led to complaints from the drivers about the congestion in the pits.

Qualifying resulted in pole position for Reutemann with Piquet second for Brabham and Pironi third in his turbocharged Ferrari. Fourth place went to Patrese, with the top 10 being completed by Watson, Jones, Villeneuve, Cheever, Laffite, and Mansell.

The race, however, was an appalling embarrassment by top motor racing standards. At the start, there was a drivers' strike concerning mechanic and team personnel safety, they complained that their views were being ignored, which delayed the start. When the race started, an Arrows mechanic, Dave Luckett, jumped onto the grid just as the clerk of the course hit the lights to go green in an attempt to start Riccardo Patrese's stalled car. Luckett was run over by the other Arrows driver, Siegfried Stohr, and as Luckett laid sprawled unconscious on the track with broken legs, the marshals were able to get him off the track. The disorganization continued: as the drivers started their second lap with both Arrows cars still on the narrow start–finish straight, a number of marshals, protesting the clerk's dangerous decision, jumped onto the track, mere feet from the cars going at full racing speeds, and attempted to stop the race by waving at the drivers to stop, without the approval of the clerk of the course (who is the ultimate authority on the race's direction). The drivers continued on because they had not been shown the red flag by the clerk of the course, who is the only person at a Grand Prix who can show this flag. But by the time they were to start a third lap, the marshals succeeded in stopping the field themselves. In the meantime, Luckett was taken to hospital, and would survive.

When the race restarted neither Arrows took part. Pironi took the lead with Reutemann, Piquet, Watson, and Jones chasing him. The Australian looked very strong in the early laps as he passed Watson and Reutemann and then Jones had a brush with Piquet which left the Brabham in the catchfencing. A furious Piquet charged up to Jones in the pits and attempted to physically fight him. On lap 12 he took the lead from Pironi but eight laps later the Williams jumped out of gear at Bianchibocht and smashed into the barriers. Piquet was fortunate to escape with a scalded thigh caused by water from a demolished radiator. This left Reutemann in the lead from Laffite and Mansell, Pironi having dropped back after going off. Watson was fourth with Villeneuve fifth and de Angelis sixth. It then started to rain, and the race was called off early at 75% distance with Reutemann taking his last victory. In the closing laps Watson faded with gearbox trouble and so Villeneuve finished fourth, de Angelis fifth and Cheever sixth.

=== Race 6: Monaco ===
The historic Monaco Grand Prix was the scene of an ultra-exciting race. With too many cars entered there had to be a pre-qualifying session to get the field down to 26 for practice. This eliminated both Tolemans, both Marches and the single ATS of Slim Borgudd. A further six were lost in qualifying with Hector Rebaque (Brabham), Rosberg and Chico Serra (Fittipaldi), Jabouille, and the two Osellas (Piercarlo Ghinzani and Beppe Gabbiani) all going home early. At the front of the grid Piquet was on pole in his Brabham with Villeneuve a remarkable second in this near downforce-absent Ferrari and an impressive Mansell third in the new Lotus 87, which made its first appearance. Then came Reutemann, Patrese, de Angelis, Jones, Laffite, and Alain Prost (Renault). Watson completed the top 10 in the McLaren MP4/1.

At the start there was the usual first corner accident as Andrea de Cesaris (McLaren) tangled with Mario Andretti's Alfa Romeo. Piquet took the lead with Villeneuve chasing and Mansell third ahead of the two Williams cars. The young Englishman disappeared early on with a suspension problem and Reutemann went out with gearbox trouble and Jones moved up ahead of Villeneuve and began to pressure Piquet for the lead. On lap 53 Piquet came up to lap some backmarkers, went offline and slid off into a barrier at Tabac. Jones took the lead and seemed to have the race in his pocket until lap 67 when he went into the pits with a fuel vaporization problem. He was soon on his way again but Villeneuve saw his chance and began to close in. On lap 72 Villeneuve took the lead at Ste Devote. A disappointed Jones finished second with Laffite third, Pironi fourth, Eddie Cheever fifth (despite being two laps down) and Marc Surer sixth in the Ensign.

=== Race 7: Spain ===
Three weeks after the Monaco Grand Prix, the narrow and tight Jarama circuit just outside Madrid was the location for the Spanish Grand Prix, and it produced one of the best races of the year. The field had altered somewhat with Eliseo Salazar having left March to join Ensign, displacing Marc Surer. Laffite took pole in his Ligier-Matra with the two Williams-DFVs of Jones and Reutemann second and third ahead of Watson, Prost, and the Alfa of Bruno Giacomelli. Villeneuve was seventh.

Race day was incredibly hot. The temperature would be around 38-degrees Celsius when the race began, with Jones and Reutemann blasting into the lead as Laffite made a poor start with Villeneuve diving into third place at the first corner, snagging Prost's front wing as he took the place. At the end of the first lap Villeneuve pulled out of Reutemann's slipstream and took second place. Jones quickly built a lead but on lap 14 - when he was around 10 seconds ahead - he went off at Nuvolari. This left Villeneuve in the lead with Reutemann on his tail. Behind them Watson, Laffite and Elio de Angelis emerged from the hurly-burly and all began to close on the dueling leaders. Reutemann was having some trouble with his gearbox and when Laffite arrived behind him there was little Reutemann could do to stop Jacques overtaking. The Argentine would later drop behind Watson as well as the five front-runners became a train of cars, nose-to-tail for the 18 laps of the race. Villeneuve had the power to get away from his rivals on the straight but in the corners they were all over him. Time and time again Laffite pulled alongside as they emerged from a corner but the Ferrari would surge ahead as the horsepower kicked in. Villeneuve, Jacques Laffite, John Watson, Reutemann and Elio de Angelis remained locked together right to the flag, crossing the line covered by just 1.24s to record the second closest race in the history of F1 at the time. Villeneuve, in a powerful but very ill-handling Ferrari, managed to keep 4 better-handling cars behind him in a car that was badly suited to the slow, narrow and twisty Jarama circuit.

The small crowd, the inappropriate time of year this race was held in and the waning interest of the organizers caused this race to be the last Spanish Grand Prix until 1986, when it was moved south to the new Jerez circuit near Seville.

=== Race 8: France ===
Two weeks after Gilles Villeneuve's extraordinary victory in Spain, the alternating French Grand Prix moved from the Paul Ricard circuit near Marseille to the fast, sweeping Prenois circuit near Dijon, located in the Burgundy countryside where the F1 gathered with Carlos Reutemann well ahead of Nelson Piquet in the World Championship.

Marc Surer (displaced from Ensign by Eliseo Salazar) had taken over the Theodore drive, leaving Patrick Tambay out of work. However, Jabouille had decided to retire as he was no longer competitive as a result of the leg injuries he had suffered in Canada in 1980 and so Tambay became the second Talbot Ligier driver. This was perfect as it reduced the field to 30 cars and meant that there was no need for pre-qualifying. The other news was that Goodyear had returned to F1 and so Williams and Brabham appeared on Goodyear tyres, while Ensign and March used Avon. Qualifying resulted in pole position for Arnoux's Renault. This was not a surprise but second place for Watson's McLaren MP4/1 was rather startling, particularly as the Marlboro car was ahead of the second Renault driven by Prost. Fourth place went to Piquet with Andrea de Cesaris (McLaren), Laffite, Reutemann, de Angelis, Jones and Mario Andretti (Alfa Romeo) completing the top 10.

On the first lap Piquet took the lead from Watson, Prost, de Cesaris and Villeneuve (who had been 11th on the grid in his Ferrari) while Arnoux dropped back to ninth. Prost soon moved ahead of Watson while further back de Cesaris was pushed behind Villeneuve, although both men were then overtaken by Reutemann. Arnoux recovered to run fifth and he moved up to fourth ahead of Reutemann on lap 33 only to run into trouble and drop back behind the Argentine driver.

On lap 58 there was a torrential downpour and the race was stopped. The weather cleared up quickly and so it was decided that the second part of the race would be run with the grid based on the finishing order of the first part. This time Piquet was engulfed by Prost's Renault and he was followed ahead by Watson and Arnoux. Piquet faded quickly behind Pironi and any advantage he had had in the first part of the race disappeared. Prost stayed ahead all the way to the flag to win his first of 51 F1 victories at home in a Renault and he was followed home by Watson. Piquet was given third place (although he was fifth on the road) while the remaining points went to Arnoux, Pironi and de Angelis. Prost was to become one of the greatest drivers in Formula One history in the future.

=== Race 9: Britain ===
The British Grand Prix was held at the flat Silverstone circuit this year, which was the fastest Grand Prix circuit in the world at the time. The field was almost the same as at Dijon two weeks earlier except that Jean-Pierre Jarier had been hired to drive for Osella in place of Miguel Angel Guerra. Team Lotus appeared with the Lotus 88B but once again the team ran into trouble with FISA over the legality of the car and eventually the cars were disqualified. As they had been built by cannibalizing the 87s the team had no choice but to withdraw. Qualifying resulted in a 1-2 for the Renaults of Arnoux and Prost with Nelson Piquet third in his Brabham. The Brazilian used a new BMW turbo-engined BT50 in the course of practice but set his time in the old BT49C. Pironi was fourth fastest for Ferrari and then came the two McLarens of Watson and de Cesaris. The fourth row featured Jones alongside Villeneuve's Ferrari while the top 10 was completed by Reutemann (Williams) and Patrese (Arrows).

Raceday was on a Saturday, and at the start Prost walked away from the field. At the start of lap 5, near the Woodcote chicane, Villeneuve lost control, taking out Alan Jones (Williams) and Andrea de Cesaris (McLaren) who were both unable to avoid the Canadian, while Briton John Watson, in the other McLaren, narrowly missed the wreckage. Villeneuve managed to get the badly damaged Ferrari going again but only got as far as Stowe Corner before parking. On lap 12, Nelson Piquet, who was 3rd at that point, crashed his Brabham at Becketts and had to be carried by an ambulance due to leg injuries. Later in the race, Prost was forced to pit due to problems with an engine plug that could not be replaced without dismantling much of the car, forcing the Frenchman to retire and leaving his teammate, Arnoux, in the lead. Watson was now fighting back, and after being delayed by the Villeneuve-Jones incident he overtook Reutemann and Andretti, and closed on Pironi. Shortly after being overtaken by Watson, the Ferrari's engine blew, so Watson was a safe third with only the two Renault drivers ahead. On the 17th lap Prost retired but Arnoux remained firmly ahead with Watson second, Reutemann third, Andretti fourth, Patrese fifth and Hector Rebaque (Brabham) sixth. Patrese soon moved ahead of Andretti while Rebaque dropped down the order when he stopped for new tyres, Laffite moving into sixth place. The order was then settled until the 50th lap when the Renault engine began to sound odd and Watson began to close up quickly. On the 60th lap he went ahead. At the same moment Andretti disappeared with a throttle cable failure and as Arnoux faded through the field Patrese went out with an engine failure. This meant that the final order was Watson taking victory, with Reutemann, Laffite, Eddie Cheever (Tyrrell), Rebaque and Slim Borgudd (ATS) rounding out the points.

=== Race 10: Germany ===
The German Grand Prix at the very fast, straight dominated Hockenheimring saw the field being unchanged apart from the fact that Team Lotus was back in action with a pair of Lotus 87s, both sporting new JPS sponsorship. There were some changes of tyres with Tyrrell running on Avons, Lotus on Goodyear and Arrows on Pirellis. It was no surprise to see the two Renault turbo cars on the front row with Prost nearly half a second quicker than Arnoux. World Championship leader Reutemann was third with his Williams teammate Jones fourth. Pironi was fifth in his Ferrari, and Piquet was sixth in his Brabham (apparently without any problems from his Silverstone accident), while the top 10 was completed by Laffite, Villeneuve, and the two McLarens of Watson and de Cesaris.

The race turned out to be a classic, and at the start Prost took the lead but Reutemann managed to get ahead of Arnoux. On the run down to the first chicane Pironi also went past Arnoux and Piquet tried the same at the Ostkurve. The Renault and the Brabham touched. This meant that Arnoux had to pit at the end of the lap with a deflated right rear. While this was going on Jones went past Piquet. Halfway around the second lap Pironi disappeared with a blown engine, with Prost leading over Reutemann, Jones, Piquet, Laffite, Villeneuve and Patrick Tambay (Talbot Ligier). Villeneuve soon dropped away but Jones was in combative form and was challenging Prost for the lead in a superb battle. Behind them Piquet had overtaken Reutemann and was closing up; the fight for the lead was soon between the three cars. But Piquet's tyres, improperly worn from his Brabham suffering bodywork damage, could not take the pace and he dropped back behind Reutemann. On lap 21 Jones finally managed to get ahead of Prost in the stadium when they were lapping Arnoux. Behind the top five Rebaque had moved into sixth but this became fifth when Reutemann stopped on lap 28 with an engine failure. At two-thirds distance rain began to fall and as the Renault became more difficult to control Piquet was able to take second from Prost. Jones's car then began to misfire and soon Piquet and Prost were both ahead. Jones headed for the pits. Piquet thus inherited victory with Prost second, Laffite third and Rebaque fourth. Eddie Cheever was fifth with Watson sixth.

=== Race 11: Austria ===
When F1 descended upon the fast and sweeping Österreichring, the entry was as normal except that the Fittipaldi team, which was struggling for money, was not present because it did not have enough engines. Tyrrell had switched from Avon tyres to Goodyear. Eddie Cheever would fail to make the grid in the new Tyrrell 011. With Austria's extra altitude the turbocharged cars were at an advantage, so Arnoux and Prost put their Renaults on the front row with Villeneuve's Ferrari third. Laffite was next up in the Talbot Ligier (powered by a Matra V12 engine) while Williams teammates Carlos Reutemann and Alan Jones were fifth and sixth. The top 10 was completed by Nelson Piquet, Didier Pironi, Elio de Angelis, and Riccardo Patrese.

At the start Villeneuve blasted his Ferrari into the lead ahead of Prost, Arnoux and Pironi (who had made a fast start in his Ferrari). Villeneuve pushed too hard on the second lap and went off at the chicane, rejoining in sixth place. This left Prost and Arnoux to pull away while Pironi's Ferrari provided a road block for those chasing. The cork stayed in the bottle until the ninth lap, by which time 7 cars were stuck behind the Renaults, which had a lead of nearly 20 seconds. Pironi's Ferrari was quicker in the straights but the car's severe lack of downforce compared to the others meant it was noticeably slower through the Österreichring's high-speed sweepers. Villeneuve crashed heavily at the Bosch Kurve while Laffite made it through with a very brave pass at the first Panorama curve and he was followed by Piquet. Laffite began to close up but then the gap stabilized. Pironi dropped back behind the two Williams cars, Jones still leading Reutemann. By mid-distance Laffite was within striking distance of the Renaults before Prost suffered a suspension failure and went out, allowing Arnoux to take the lead. On lap 39 Laffite finally managed to get ahead as the pair diced through traffic. Arnoux had to settle for second while third went to Piquet. Jones and Reutemann were fourth and fifth and the final point went to John Watson (McLaren).

=== Race 12: Holland ===
The Fittipaldi team was back in action for the Dutch GP at the Zandvoort circuit near Amsterdam after missing the Austrian GP but had switched to Pirelli tyres. Otherwise the field was the same as usual and it was an all-Renault front row with Alain Prost outqualifying Rene Arnoux. Third place went to World Championship challenger Piquet with his rival Reutemann fifth, behind his Williams teammate Jones. Laffite was sixth in his Talbot Ligier just ahead of Andretti, Watson, de Angelis, and Patrese. Andrea de Cesaris qualified 13th but was withdrawn because the team was worried that he would damage another car, his season with the team having seen a string of accidents. The Italian De Cesaris, although quick, was horrendously erratic - he ended up crashing no less than 19 times this season, including 8 times during a race, and even more remarkably without injuring himself once.

At the start Prost and Arnoux went into Tarzan ahead but behind them Gilles Villeneuve tried to make up for his poor qualifying and charged through a gap between Patrese and Bruno Giacomelli's Alfa Romeo. Giacomelli was unaware that Villeneuve was there and the result was that Villeneuve ran into the Alfa, vaulted over it and landed, spinning. At the next corner Andretti and Reutemann collided and the American ended up with a bent front wing. Also in trouble were Pironi and Tambay, the pair having collided in the course of the first lap. This left Prost leading Arnoux and Jones with Piquet fourth, Laffite fifth and Reutemann sixth. In the opening laps Jones went ahead of Arnoux and the Frenchman soon dropped behind Piquet and Laffite as well. By the 10th lap Reutemann too was clear of Arnoux and a couple of laps later Watson drove around the outside of Arnoux at Tarzan to take sixth place. The order at the front remained unchanged but Jones was beginning to challenge Prost. Behind these two there was another lively battle for fourth between Laffite and Reutemann. This ended on lap 18 with the pair colliding. Jones tried to pass Prost on several occasions but then his tyres became marginal and he dropped away. In the closing laps he fell into the clutches of Piquet and lost second place. Hector Rebaque gave Brabham fourth place after a steady run with the other points going to de Angelis and Eliseo Salazar in the Ensign, one of the few men still running, albeit two laps down. Piquet's second place meant that he was equal on points with Reutemann.

=== Race 13: Italy ===
The second Italian and last European race of the year, the Italian Grand Prix, returned to the historic Monza circuit just outside Milan after a year's stay at Imola. Nelson Piquet and Carlos Reutemann arrived on equal points in the World Championship, and the summer had been seen the emergence as a major force of Alain Prost in the Renault and he too was becoming the threat to the World Championship leaders. The switching around of tyres continued with Tyrrell deciding to go back to Goodyear at least for Eddie Cheever's car. The field was the same as usual with Arnoux on pole in the Renault ahead of Reutemann's Williams and Prost. Laffite was fourth in his Ligier and he was clear of Jones, who had arrived in Italy after being physically beaten up by 5 men in London; and Piquet while the top 10 was completed by Watson, Pironi and Villeneuve in the powerful but evil-handling Ferraris and Giacomelli's Alfa Romeo. The event was significant in that it marked the first start for the Toleman team, Brian Henton having finally qualified one of the Toleman-Hart cars in 23rd position on the grid after a season of disappointment. At the start Pironi made an exceptional start and he was fourth at the first chicane behind Prost, Reutemann and Arnoux. By the time the field arrived on the back straight Pironi was second. It did not last long Arnoux moved to second on the fifth lap and on lap six Laffite went to third (having overtaken Jones, Piquet and Reutemann). Villeneuve followed him but disappeared with turbo failure soon afterwards. Then Laffite began to drop back with a slow puncture and it began to rain. Jacques went off. This left the two Renaults and the two Williams cars ahead but with a gap between them. Arnoux then went off at the Parabolica, swerving to avoid Eddie Cheever's abandoned Tyrrell and so Prost was left on his own.

There was then a huge accident at the Lesmo when Watson lost control of his MP4/1. It spun into the barriers and the engine was ripped from the tub. Watson emerged unhurt but the engine went across the road, causing Michele Alboreto to crash his Tyrrell. The next to arrive was Reutemann and he had to take to the grass and so he dropped behind Giacomelli. The Alfa driver was not in luck however and on lap 26 his Alfa went into the pits with his gearbox jammed. this put Piquet into third place behind Prost and Jones and it looked like staying that way until the last lap when his engine blew, which allowed Reutemann, de Angelis and Pironi to pass him. He picked up just one point and Reutemann moved three points ahead in the World Championship.

=== Race 14: Canada ===
The season concluded with two races in North America, the first of these being in Montreal, Canada. Alan Jones announced that he was retiring for Formula 1 and there were rumors that Mario Andretti would do the same. At the same time, Niki Lauda was spotted testing one of the new McLaren MP4/1s at Donington Park and it looked like he would be making a comeback. Siegfried Stohr, after his trauma in Belgium and the uncompetitiveness of the Arrows, then decided that he no longer wanted to be an F1 driver and a deal was struck for Riccardo Patrese to be partnered in Canada by Gilles Villeneuve's brother Jacques Villeneuve. (Note: Jacques Villeneuve, the brother of Gilles Villeneuve, not to be confused with 1995 Indianapolis 500 and 1997 Formula One World Champion Jacques Villeneuve, son of Gilles Villeneuve.) Qualifying resulted in pole position for Piquet with his title rival Reutemann alongside. Jones was third while Prost was fourth in his Renault.

The weather had turned cold and wet by race day and at the start Jones took the lead after banging wheels with Reutemann. The Argentine driver had to lift off and he was overtaken by rival Piquet, Prost and de Angelis. Further back, Villeneuve tipped Arnoux into a spin, the Renault bashing into Pironi's Ferrari as it went off. In the laps that followed Villeneuve moved up to take third on lap 7 when Jones spun and Piquet dropped back as he tried to avoid the Williams. This let Prost take the lead with Laffite second. Watson moved to fourth and things began to settle down until lap 13 when Laffite moved into the lead. He was followed through into second place a few laps later by Villeneuve and as Prost faded further he fell behind Watson as well. Watson was then able to catch and pass Villeneuve as well, with the race finishing in that order. Fourth place ended up going to Bruno Giacomelli (Alfa Romeo), fifth to Piquet and sixth to de Angelis. Piquet's two points mean that he and Reutemann headed to Las Vegas separated by a point while Laffite had an outside chance of winning the title.

=== Race 15: Caesars Palace (United States) ===
The Watkins Glen circuit in the state of New York was removed from the calendar in May due to bankruptcy of the company operating the circuit, resulting in a three-week long gap between the Canadian Grand Prix and the new Caesars Palace Grand Prix, at a circuit located in a car park outside of the Caesars Palace hotel and casino complex in Las Vegas, Nevada. During this time frame, Niki Lauda announced his decision to return to F1 with McLaren in 1982. Many in the F1 paddock were confused and unhappy to be racing around the car park of a Las Vegas casino.

World Championship leader Carlos Reutemann qualified on pole ahead of his teammate Alan Jones. The Australian had no intent to do anything to help the Argentine to the title because of their clash over team orders at the start of the year. He was retiring from F1 after the race and had nothing to lose whilst prioritizing a victory. Third on the grid was Gilles Villeneuve in the Ferrari, with Reutemann's title rival Nelson Piquet fourth, Alain Prost fifth in his Renault and John Watson sixth in the McLaren.

In dry, 24 °C (75 °F) conditions, Jones took the lead at the start with Reutemann dropping behind Villeneuve, Prost and Giacomelli before the first corner, while Piquet was eighth. With Villeneuve holding up those behind, Jones drove to an unchallenged victory. Prost overtook Villeneuve on lap three but his Renault was not as fast as Jones' Williams. On the next lap Laffite overtook Watson and the order then stabilized with Piquet running behind Reutemann, both men out of the points. On lap 17 Piquet passed the subdued Reutemann and he was followed by Andretti. Piquet chased after Watson and took sixth place on lap 22. This was briefly fifth when Villeneuve stopped with a fuel injection problem. But Nelson was then overtaken by Andretti. A few moments later Giacomelli's promising run in fourth place ended when he went off and rejoined back in ninth position with Piquet was back in fifth but when Reutemann overtook Watson for sixth the pair were back on equal points (although Piquet would win the title on victories if the order stayed as is). Andretti retired with a broken rear suspension as Piquet moved to fourth and Reutemann to fifth. Soon afterwards Prost pitted for tyres and dropped to sixth but at the same time Mansell went ahead of Reutemann and as Prost recovered the Argentine lost another place. Prost's recovery would take him to second place, while Reutemann's unimpressive afternoon continued as he drifted behind the recovering Giacomelli. Piquet got up to third when Laffite went in for tyres but he was then overtaken by Mansell and Giacomelli, the Italian moving up to third in the closing laps. Jones would win the first Caesars Palace Grand Prix, ahead of Prost, Giacomelli, Mansell, Piquet and Laffite.

With Reutemann out of the points, Piquet's fifth place was enough to win his first of 3 World Championship titles.

== Results and standings ==
=== Grands Prix ===
Round	Grand Prix	Pole position	Fastest lap	Winning driver	Winning constructor	Report
1	United States Grand Prix West	(Italy) Riccardo Patrese	(Australia) Alan Jones	(Australia) Alan Jones	(United Kingdom) Williams-Ford	Report
2	(Brazil) Brazilian Grand Prix	(Brazil) Nelson Piquet	(Switzerland) Marc Surer	(Argentina) Carlos Reutemann	(United Kingdom) Williams-Ford	Report
3	(Argentina) Argentine Grand Prix	(Brazil) Nelson Piquet	(Brazil) Nelson Piquet	(Brazil) Nelson Piquet	(United Kingdom) Brabham-Ford	Report
4	(Italy) San Marino Grand Prix	(Canada) Gilles Villeneuve	(Canada) Gilles Villeneuve	(Brazil) Nelson Piquet	(United Kingdom) Brabham-Ford	Report
5	(Belgium) Belgian Grand Prix	(Argentina) Carlos Reutemann	(Argentina) Carlos Reutemann	(Argentina) Carlos Reutemann	(United Kingdom) Williams-Ford	Report
6	Monaco Grand Prix	(Brazil) Nelson Piquet	(Australia) Alan Jones	(Canada) Gilles Villeneuve	(Italy) Ferrari	Report
7	(Spain) Spanish Grand Prix	(France) Jacques Laffite	(Australia) Alan Jones	(Canada) Gilles Villeneuve	(Italy) Ferrari	Report
8	(France) French Grand Prix	(France) René Arnoux	(France) Alain Prost	(France) Alain Prost	(France) Renault	Report
9	(United Kingdom) British Grand Prix	(France) René Arnoux	(France) René Arnoux	(United Kingdom) John Watson	(United Kingdom) McLaren-Ford	Report
10	(West Germany) German Grand Prix	(France) Alain Prost	(Australia) Alan Jones	(Brazil) Nelson Piquet	(United Kingdom) Brabham-Ford	Report
11	(Austria) Austrian Grand Prix	(France) René Arnoux	(France) Jacques Laffite	(France) Jacques Laffite	(France) Talbot Ligier-Matra	Report
12	(Netherlands) Dutch Grand Prix	(France) Alain Prost	(Australia) Alan Jones	(France) Alain Prost	(France) Renault	Report
13	(Italy) Italian Grand Prix	(France) René Arnoux	(Argentina) Carlos Reutemann	(France) Alain Prost	(France) Renault	Report
14	(Canada) Canadian Grand Prix	(Brazil) Nelson Piquet	(United Kingdom) John Watson	(France) Jacques Laffite	(France) Talbot Ligier-Matra	Report
15	(United States) Caesars Palace Grand Prix	(Argentina) Carlos Reutemann	(France) Didier Pironi	(Australia) Alan Jones	(United Kingdom) Williams-Ford	Report

=== Scoring system ===
Points were awarded to the top six classified finishers. For the Drivers' Championship, the best ten results were counted, while, for the Constructors' Championship, all rounds were counted.

No driver classified in more than ten points-scoring positions, so no drop-rounds applied for this season. Points were awarded in the following system:

Position	1st	2nd	3rd	4th	5th	6th
Race	9	6	4	3	2	1

=== World Drivers' Championship standings ===
Pos	Driver	USW (United States)	BRA (Brazil)	ARG (Argentina)	SMR (Italy)	BEL (Belgium)	MON (Monaco)	ESP (Spain)	FRA (France)	GBR (United Kingdom)	GER (West Germany)	AUT (Austria)	NED (Netherlands)	ITA (Italy)	CAN (Canada)	CPL (United States)	Points
1	(Brazil) Nelson Piquet	3	12^{P}	1^{P}^{F}	1	Ret	Ret^{P}	Ret	3	Ret	1	3	2	6	5^{P}	5	50
2	(Argentina) Carlos Reutemann	2	1	2	3	1^{P}^{F}	Ret	4	10	2	Ret	5	Ret	3^{F}	10	8^{P}	49
3	(Australia) Alan Jones	1^{F}	2	4	12	Ret	2^{F}	7^{F}	17	Ret	11^{F}	4	3^{F}	2	Ret	1	46
4	(France) Jacques Laffite	Ret	6	Ret	Ret	2	3	2^{P}	Ret	3	3	1^{F}	Ret	Ret	1	6	44
5	(France) Alain Prost	Ret	Ret	3	Ret	Ret	Ret	Ret	1^{F}	Ret	2^{P}	Ret	1^{P}	1	Ret	2	43
6	(United Kingdom) John Watson	Ret	8	Ret	10	7	Ret	3	2	1	6	6	Ret	Ret	2^{F}	7	27
7	(Canada) Gilles Villeneuve	Ret	Ret	Ret	7^{P}^{F}	4	1	1	Ret	Ret	10	Ret	Ret	Ret	3	DSQ	25
8	(Italy) Elio de Angelis	Ret	5	6	WD	5	Ret	5	6	DSQ	7	7	5	4	6	Ret	14
9	(France) René Arnoux	8	Ret	5	8	DNQ	Ret	9	4^{P}	9^{P}^{F}	13	2^{P}	Ret	Ret^{P}	Ret	Ret	11
10	(Mexico) Héctor Rebaque	Ret	Ret	Ret	4	Ret	DNQ	Ret	9	5	4	Ret	4	Ret	Ret	Ret	11
11	(Italy) Riccardo Patrese	Ret^{P}	3	7	2	Ret	Ret	Ret	14	10	Ret	Ret	Ret	Ret	Ret	11	10
12	(United States) Eddie Cheever	5	NC	Ret	Ret	6	5	NC	13	4	5	DNQ	Ret	Ret	12	Ret	10
13	(France) Didier Pironi	Ret	Ret	Ret	5	8	4	15	5	Ret	Ret	9	Ret	5	Ret	9^{F}	9
14	(United Kingdom) Nigel Mansell	Ret	11	Ret	WD	3	Ret	6	7	DNQ	Ret	Ret	Ret	Ret	Ret	4	8
15	(Italy) Bruno Giacomelli	Ret	NC	10	Ret	9	Ret	10	15	Ret	15	Ret	Ret	8	4	3	7
16	(Switzerland) Marc Surer	Ret	4^{F}	Ret	9	11	6		12	11	14	Ret	8	DNQ	9	Ret	4
17	(United States) Mario Andretti	4	Ret	8	Ret	10	Ret	8	8	Ret	9	Ret	Ret	Ret	7	Ret	3
18	(Italy) Andrea de Cesaris	Ret	Ret	11	6	Ret	Ret	Ret	11	Ret	Ret	8	DNS	7	Ret	12	1
19	(France) Patrick Tambay	6	10	Ret	11	DNQ	7	13	Ret	Ret	Ret	Ret	Ret	Ret	Ret	Ret	1
20	(Sweden) Slim Borgudd				13	DNQ	DNPQ	DNQ	DNQ	6	Ret	Ret	10	Ret	Ret	DNQ	1
21	(Chile) Eliseo Salazar	DNQ	DNQ	DNQ	Ret	DNQ	DNPQ	14	Ret	DNQ	NC	Ret	6	Ret	Ret	NC	1
—	(France) Jean-Pierre Jarier	Ret	7							8	8	10	Ret	9	Ret	Ret	0
—	(Italy) Siegfried Stohr	DNQ	Ret	9	DNQ	Ret	Ret	Ret	DNQ	Ret	12	Ret	7	DNQ			0
—	(Republic of Ireland) Derek Daly	DNQ	DNQ	DNQ	DNQ	DNQ	DNPQ	16	Ret	7	Ret	11	Ret	Ret	8	DNQ	0
—	(Brazil) Chico Serra	7	Ret	Ret	DNQ	Ret	DNQ	11	DNS	DNQ	DNQ		DNQ	DNQ	DNQ	DNQ	0
—	(Finland) Keke Rosberg	Ret	9	Ret	Ret	Ret	DNQ	12	Ret	Ret	DNQ		DNQ	DNQ	DNQ	10	0
—	(Italy) Michele Alboreto				Ret	12	Ret	DNQ	16	Ret	DNQ	Ret	9	Ret	11	13	0
—	(United Kingdom) Brian Henton				DNQ	DNQ	DNPQ	DNQ	DNQ	DNQ	DNQ	DNQ	DNQ	10	DNQ	DNQ	0
—	(Netherlands) Jan Lammers	Ret	DNQ	12	DNQ												0
—	(Argentina) Ricardo Zunino		13	13													0
—	(Italy) Piercarlo Ghinzani					13	DNQ										0
—	(France) Jean-Pierre Jabouille		WD	DNQ	NC	Ret	DNQ	Ret									0
—	(Italy) Beppe Gabbiani	Ret	DNQ	DNQ	Ret	Ret	DNQ	DNQ	DNQ	DNQ	DNQ	DNQ	DNQ	DNQ	DNQ	DNQ	0
—	(United Kingdom) Derek Warwick				DNQ	DNQ	DNPQ	DNQ	DNQ	DNQ	DNQ	DNQ	DNQ	DNQ	DNQ	Ret	0
—	(Argentina) Miguel Ángel Guerra	DNQ	DNQ	DNQ	Ret												0
—	(Canada) Jacques Villeneuve Sr.														DNQ	DNQ	0
—	(United States) Kevin Cogan	DNQ															0
—	(Italy) Giorgio Francia							DNQ									0
—	(Colombia) Ricardo Londoño		DNP														0
—	(Spain) Emilio de Villota							EX									0
Pos	Driver	USW (United States)	BRA (Brazil)	ARG (Argentina)	SMR (Italy)	BEL (Belgium)	MON (Monaco)	ESP (Spain)	FRA (France)	GBR (United Kingdom)	GER (West Germany)	AUT (Austria)	NED (Netherlands)	ITA (Italy)	CAN (Canada)	CPL (United States)	Points

Key
Colour	Result
Gold	Winner
Silver	Second place
Bronze	Third place
Green	Other points position
Blue	Other classified position
Blue	Not classified, finished (NC)
Purple	Not classified, retired (Ret)
Red	Did not qualify (DNQ)
Red	Did not pre-qualify (DNPQ)
Black	Disqualified (DSQ)
White	Did not start (DNS)
White	Race cancelled (C)
Blank	Did not practice (DNP)
Blank	Excluded (EX)
Blank	Did not arrive (DNA)
Blank	Withdrawn (WD)
Blank	Did not enter (empty cell)
Annotation	Meaning
P	Pole position
F	Fastest lap
†	Did not finish, but classified for completing over 90% of the race distance

=== World Constructors' Championship standings ===
Pos	Constructor	Car no.	USW (United States)	BRA (Brazil)	ARG (Argentina)	SMR (Italy)	BEL (Belgium)	MON (Monaco)	ESP (Spain)	FRA (France)	GBR (United Kingdom)	GER (West Germany)	AUT (Austria)	NED (Netherlands)	ITA (Italy)	CAN (Canada)	CPL (United States)	Pts
1	(United Kingdom) Williams-Ford	1	1^{F}	2	4	12	Ret	2^{F}	7^{F}	17	Ret	11^{F}	4	3^{F}	2	Ret	1	95
1	(United Kingdom) Williams-Ford	2	2	1	2	3	1^{P}^{F}	Ret	4	10	2	Ret	5	Ret	3^{F}	10	8^{P}	95
1	(United Kingdom) Williams-Ford	37							EX									95
2	(United Kingdom) Brabham-Ford	5	3	12^{P}	1^{P}^{F}	1	Ret	Ret^{P}	Ret	3	Ret	1	3	2	6	5^{P}	5	61
2	(United Kingdom) Brabham-Ford	6	Ret	Ret	Ret	4	Ret	DNQ	Ret	9	5	4	Ret	4	Ret	Ret	Ret	61
3	(France) Renault	15	Ret	Ret	3	Ret	Ret	Ret	Ret	1^{F}	Ret	2^{P}^{F}	Ret	1^{P}^{F}	1	Ret	2	54
3	(France) Renault	16	8	Ret	5	8	DNQ	Ret	9	4^{P}	9^{P}^{F}	13	2^{P}	Ret	Ret^{P}	Ret	Ret	54
4	(France) Talbot Ligier-Matra	25	Ret	7	DNQ	NC	Ret	DNQ	Ret	Ret	Ret	Ret	Ret	Ret	Ret	Ret	Ret	44
4	(France) Talbot Ligier-Matra	26	Ret	6	Ret	Ret	2	3	2^{P}	Ret	3	3	1^{F}	Ret	Ret	1	6	44
5	(Italy) Ferrari	27	Ret	Ret	Ret	7^{P}^{F}	4	1	1	Ret	Ret	10	Ret	Ret	Ret	3	DSQ	34
5	(Italy) Ferrari	28	Ret	Ret	Ret	5	8	4	15	5	Ret	Ret	9	Ret	5	Ret	9^{F}	34
6	(United Kingdom) McLaren-Ford	7	Ret	8	Ret	10	7	Ret	3	2	1	6	6	Ret	Ret	2^{F}	7	28
6	(United Kingdom) McLaren-Ford	8	Ret	Ret	11	6	Ret	Ret	Ret	11	Ret	Ret	8	DNS	7	Ret	12	28
7	(United Kingdom) Lotus-Ford	11	Ret	5	6	WD	5	Ret	5	6	DSQ	7	7	5	4	6	Ret	22
7	(United Kingdom) Lotus-Ford	12	Ret	11	Ret	WD	3	Ret	6	7	DNQ	Ret	Ret	Ret	Ret	Ret	4	22
8	(United Kingdom) Arrows-Ford	29	Ret^{P}	3	7	2	Ret	Ret	Ret	14	10	Ret	Ret	Ret	Ret	Ret	11	10
8	(United Kingdom) Arrows-Ford	30	DNQ	Ret	9	DNQ	Ret	Ret	Ret	DNQ	Ret	12	Ret	7	DNQ	DNQ	DNQ	10
9	(Italy) Alfa Romeo	22	4	Ret	8	Ret	10	Ret	8	8	Ret	9	Ret	Ret	Ret	7	Ret	10
9	(Italy) Alfa Romeo	23	Ret	NC	10	Ret	9	Ret	10	15	Ret	15	Ret	Ret	8	4	3	10
10	(United Kingdom) Tyrrell-Ford	3	5	NC	Ret	Ret	6	5	NC	13	4	5	DNQ	Ret	Ret	12	Ret	10
10	(United Kingdom) Tyrrell-Ford	4	DNQ	13	13	Ret	12	Ret	DNQ	16	Ret	DNQ	Ret	9	Ret	11	13	10
11	(United Kingdom) Ensign-Ford	14	Ret	4^{F}	Ret	9	11	6	14	Ret	DNQ	NC	Ret	6	Ret	Ret	NC	5
12	(Hong Kong) Theodore-Ford	33	6	10	Ret	11	DNQ	7	13	12	11	14	Ret	8	DNQ	9	Ret	1
13	(West Germany) ATS-Ford	9	Ret	DNQ	12	DNQ	DNQ		DNQ	DNQ	6	Ret	Ret	10	Ret	Ret	DNQ	1
13	(West Germany) ATS-Ford	10				13		DNPQ										1
—	(United Kingdom) March-Ford	17	DNQ	DNQ	DNQ	Ret	DNQ	DNPQ	16	Ret	7	Ret	11	Ret	Ret	8	DNQ	0
—	(United Kingdom) March-Ford	18	DNQ	DNQ	DNQ	DNQ	DNQ	DNPQ										0
—	(Brazil) Fittipaldi-Ford	20	Ret	9	Ret	Ret	Ret	DNQ	12	Ret	Ret	DNQ		DNQ	DNQ	DNQ	10	0
—	(Brazil) Fittipaldi-Ford	21	7	Ret	Ret	DNQ	Ret	DNQ	11	DNS	DNQ	DNQ		DNQ	DNQ	DNQ	DNQ	0
—	(Italy) Osella-Ford	31	DNQ	DNQ	DNQ	Ret	13	DNQ	DNQ	DNQ	DNQ	DNQ	DNQ	DNQ	DNQ	DNQ	DNQ	0
—	(Italy) Osella-Ford	32	Ret	DNQ	DNQ	Ret	Ret	DNQ	DNQ	WD	8	8	10	Ret	9	Ret	Ret	0
—	(United Kingdom) Toleman-Hart	35				DNQ	DNQ	DNPQ	DNQ	DNQ	DNQ	DNQ	DNQ	DNQ	10	DNQ	DNQ	0
—	(United Kingdom) Toleman-Hart	36				DNQ	DNQ	DNPQ	DNQ	DNQ	DNQ	DNQ	DNQ	DNQ	DNQ	DNQ	Ret	0
Pos	Constructor	Car no.	USW (United States)	BRA (Brazil)	ARG (Argentina)	SMR (Italy)	BEL (Belgium)	MON (Monaco)	ESP (Spain)	FRA (France)	GBR (United Kingdom)	GER (West Germany)	AUT (Austria)	NED (Netherlands)	ITA (Italy)	CAN (Canada)	CPL (United States)	Pts

== Non-championship race ==
A single non-championship Formula One race was also held in 1981. It was technically a Formula Libre race, since the cars did not conform to the current Formula One regulations. Although not a part of the World Championship, the 1981 South African Grand Prix attracted high-calibre drivers and cars and was won by Carlos Reutemann in a Williams.

Race name	Circuit	Date	Winning driver	Constructor	Report
(South Africa) South African Grand Prix	Kyalami	7 February	(Argentina) Carlos Reutemann	(United Kingdom) Williams-Ford	Report
