= 2021 FIA Masters Historic Formula One Championship =

The 2021 FIA Masters Historic Formula One Championship was the ninth season of the FIA Masters Historic Formula One Championship. It began at Donington Park on 2 April and ended at Algarve International Circuit on 31 October.

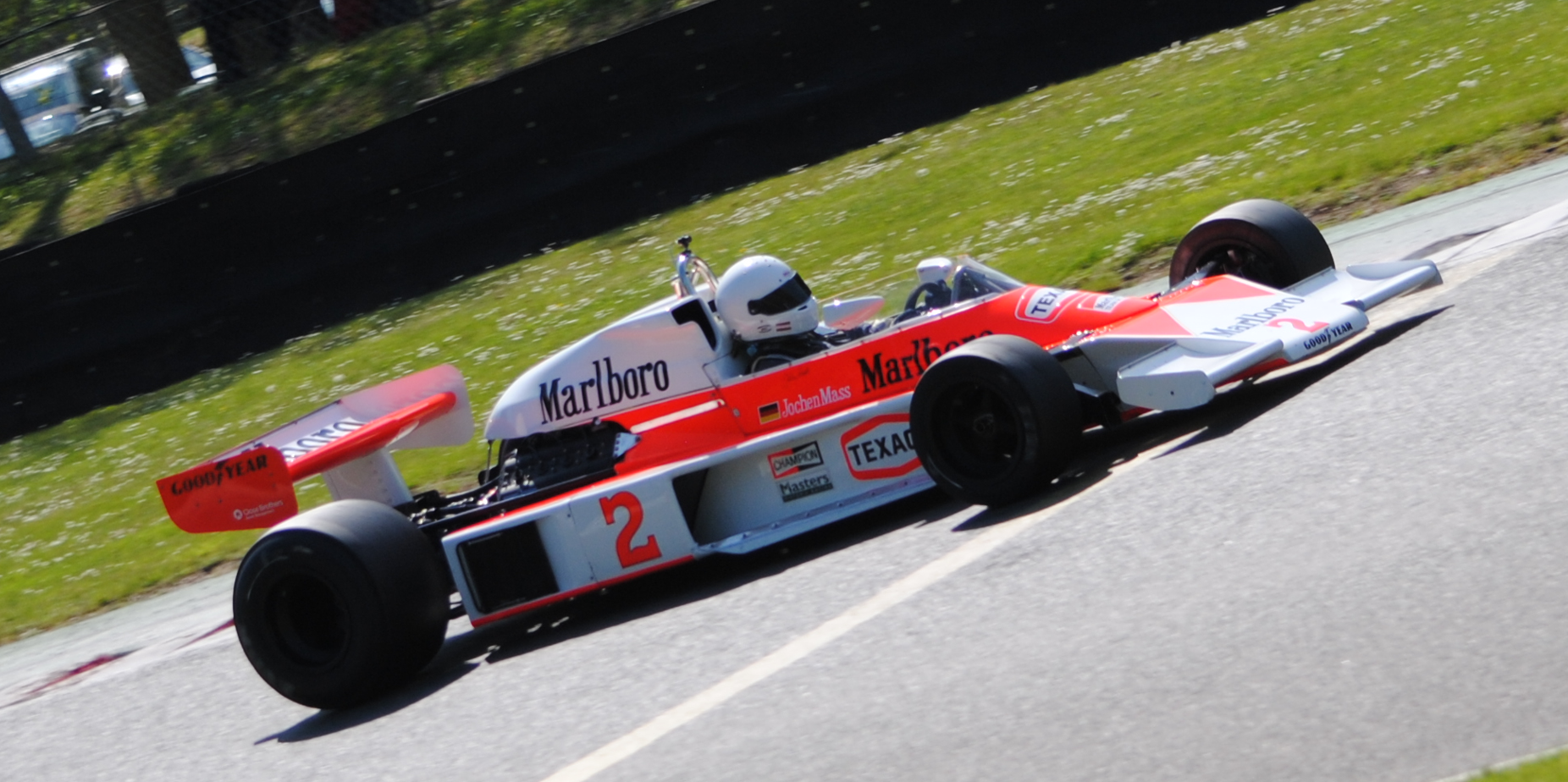
Lukas Halusa is the champion of the Fittipaldi class in a McLaren M23.

== Cars and drivers ==
Team	Chassis	Engine	No.	Driver	Class	Rounds
(United Kingdom) Hall & Hall	McLaren M23	Ford Cosworth DFV 3.0 L V8	2	(Austria) Lukas Halusa	F	All
(United Kingdom) Hall & Hall	Hesketh 308E	Ford Cosworth DFV 3.0 L V8	15	(France) Michel Baudoin	F	3–4, 6–7
(United Kingdom) Complete Motorsport Solutions	Tyrrell 012	Ford Cosworth DFY 3.0 L V8	3	(United Kingdom) Ian Simmonds	L	1–2, 4
(United Kingdom) Complete Motorsport Solutions	Tyrrell 011	Ford Cosworth DFV 3.0 L V8	23	(United States) Ken Tyrrell	H	4–5
(France) AGS Racing	Tyrrell 010	Ford Cosworth DFV 3.0 L V8	3	(France) Evens Stievenart	H	3
(Germany) Steinke Sportwagen Service	Alfa Romeo 182	Alfa Romeo 3.0 L V12	3	(Germany) Thomas Steinke	H	5
(United Kingdom) CGA Race Engineering	Tyrrell P34 (continuation)	Ford Cosworth DFV 3.0 L V8	5	(United States) Jonathan Holtzman	F	2, 4
(United Kingdom) CGA Race Engineering	Williams FW07C	Ford Cosworth DFV 3.0 L V8	7	(United Kingdom) Mike Cantillon	H	1, 3–7
(United Kingdom) CGA Race Engineering	Williams FW07C	Ford Cosworth DFV 3.0 L V8	37	(Belgium) Christophe d'Ansembourg	H	3, 5–7
(United Kingdom) CGA Race Engineering	Lotus 91	Ford Cosworth DFV 3.0 L V8	21	(Japan) Katsuaki Kubota	H	6–7
(United Kingdom) CGA Race Engineering	Tyrrell 011	Ford Cosworth DFV 3.0 L V8	45	(United Kingdom) Jamie Constable	H	4
(United Kingdom) CGA Race Engineering	Tyrrell 011	Ford Cosworth DFV 3.0 L V8	99	(United Kingdom) Jamie Constable	H	5–7
(Germany) Britec Motorsport	Lotus 92	Ford Cosworth DFV 3.0 L V8	5	(Germany) Marco Werner	L	3
(Germany) Britec Motorsport	Lotus 81	Ford Cosworth DFV 3.0 L V8	11	(Germany) Marco Werner	H	5–7
(Germany) Britec Motorsport	Lotus 77	Ford Cosworth DFV 3.0 L V8	6	(United Kingdom) Nick Padmore	F	3, 5–6
(Germany) Britec Motorsport	Lotus 92	Ford Cosworth DFV 3.0 L V8	6	(United Kingdom) Nick Padmore	L	7
(Germany) Britec Motorsport	Lotus 92	Ford Cosworth DFV 3.0 L V8	21	(Switzerland) Felix Haas	L	5
(Germany) Britec Motorsport	Theodore N183	Ford Cosworth DFV 3.0 L V8	33	(Germany) Georg Hallau	L	3, 5
(United Kingdom) University of Bolton	Ensign N180B	Ford Cosworth DFV 3.0 L V8	8	(United Kingdom) Michael Lyons	H	4
(United Kingdom) University of Bolton	Surtees TS9	Ford Cosworth DFV 3.0 L V8	9	(United Kingdom) Judy Lyons	S	4
(United Kingdom) Nine-W Race Engineering	March 751	Ford Cosworth DFV 3.0 L V8	9	(United States) Robert Blain	F	6–7
(United Kingdom) Nine-W Race Engineering	Theodore TR1	Ford Cosworth DFV 3.0 L V8	32	(United Kingdom) Philip Hall	F	2
(United Kingdom) Nine-W Race Engineering	McLaren M29	Ford Cosworth DFV 3.0 L V8	78	(New Zealand) Warren Briggs	H	1–2, 4–7
(France) Gislain Genecand	Surtees TS5A	Chevrolet 5.0 L V8	11	(France) Gislain Genecand	I	3
(United Kingdom) O'Connell Racing	Lotus 91	Ford Cosworth DFV 3.0 L V8	12	(United Kingdom) Steve Brooks	H	1, 3–7
(United Kingdom) O'Connell Racing	Williams FW08C	Ford Cosworth DFV 3.0 L V8	16	(United Kingdom) Mark Hazell	L	All
(United Kingdom) O'Connell Racing	Surtees TS16	Ford Cosworth DFV 3.0 L V8	18	(Belgium) Marc Davis	F	2–3, 6–7
(United Kingdom) O'Connell Racing	Ensign N179	Ford Cosworth DFV 3.0 L V8	22	(United Kingdom) Paul Tattersall	H	3–7
(United Kingdom) O'Connell Racing	Tyrrell 011	Ford Cosworth DFV 3.0 L V8	99	(United Kingdom) Jamie Constable	H	3
(United Kingdom) Winfield	Ensign MN181-B	Ford Cosworth DFV 3.0 L V8	14	(France) Laurent Fort	H	3
(United Kingdom) Chris Perkins Racing	Surtees TS14	Ford Cosworth DFV 3.0 L V8	19	(United Kingdom) Chris Perkins	F	1–2, 4
(France) Gerard Dery	Matra MS120C	Matra MS72 3.0 L V12	20	(United Kingdom) 'Mr John of B'	S	3
(France) Gerard Dery	Ligier JS11/15	Ford Cosworth DFV 3.0 L V8	69	(United Kingdom) 'Mr John of B'	H	3
(Switzerland) Nicolas Matile	Matra MS120B	Matra MS72 3.0 L V12	21	(Switzerland) Nicolas Matile	S	3
(United Kingdom) Zul Racing	Tyrrell 011	Ford Cosworth DFV 3.0 L V8	23	(United States) Ken Tyrrell	H	2
(United Kingdom) Richard Hope	Alfa Romeo 182	Alfa Romeo 3.0 L V12	25	(United Kingdom) Richard Hope	H	7
(France) Team La Fenice	Arrows A1B	Ford Cosworth DFV 3.0 L V8	29	(Monaco) Frédéric Lajoux	H	3
(United Kingdom) Forza Historic Racing	Fittipaldi F5A	Ford Cosworth DFV 3.0 L V8	34	(United Kingdom) Miles Griffiths	F	6
(United Kingdom) Forza Historic Racing	Shadow DN5	Ford Cosworth DFV 3.0 L V8	76	(United Kingdom) Max Smith-Hilliard	F	6–7
(France) Ecurie Griffith's	March 761	Ford Cosworth DFV 3.0 L V8	38	(France) Patrick d'Aubreby	F	3, 6
(France) Acceuil Moteur	Trojan T103	Ford Cosworth DFV 3.0 L V8	41	(France) Philippe Bonny	F	3
(France) Acceuil Moteur	March 811	Ford Cosworth DFV 3.0 L V8	71	(France) Vincent Rivet	H	3
(United Kingdom) Scott Sport	Arrows A5	Ford Cosworth DFV 3.0 L V8	49	(United Kingdom) Neil Glover	H	1–2, 4
(United Kingdom) Mirage Engineering	LEC CRP1	Ford Cosworth DFV 3.0 L V8	51	(United Kingdom) Ron Maydon	F	1
(United Kingdom) Mirage Engineering	McLaren MP4/1	Ford Cosworth DFV 3.0 L V8	77	(United Kingdom) Steve Hartley	H	1–2, 4
(United Kingdom) Wren Classics	Lola T332	Chevrolet 5.0 L V8	74	(United Kingdom) Steve Farthing	I	6
(United Kingdom) X Tec Engineering	Shadow DN9	Ford Cosworth DFV 3.0 L V8	93	(United Kingdom) Mark Harrison	H	1–2, 4
(France) Alain Giradet	McLaren M10B	Chevrolet 5.0 L V8	112	(France) Alain Giradet	I	3

Icon	Class
F	Fittipaldi Class
H	Head Class
L	Lauda Class
S	Stewart Class
I	Invitational Class

== Race results ==
Bold indicates overall winner.

Round		Race	Circuit	Date	Pole position	Fastest lap	Winning ST	Winning FT	Winning HE	Winning LA
1	R1	Masters Historic Race Weekend	(United Kingdom) Donington Park	2 April	(United Kingdom) Steve Hartley	(United Kingdom) Mike Cantillon	No entries	(Austria) Lukas Halusa	**(United Kingdom) Mike Cantillon**	(United Kingdom) Mark Hazell
1	R2	Masters Historic Race Weekend	(United Kingdom) Donington Park	3 April	(United Kingdom) Steve Hartley	(United Kingdom) Steve Hartley	No entries	(Austria) Lukas Halusa	**(United Kingdom) Mike Cantillon**	(United Kingdom) Mark Hazell
2	R3	Masters Historic Festival	(United Kingdom) Brands Hatch	29 May	(United Kingdom) Steve Hartley	(United Kingdom) Steve Hartley	No entries	(Austria) Lukas Halusa	**(United Kingdom) Steve Hartley**	(United Kingdom) Mark Hazell
2	R4	Masters Historic Festival	(United Kingdom) Brands Hatch	30 May		(United Kingdom) Steve Hartley	No entries	(Austria) Lukas Halusa	**(United Kingdom) Steve Hartley**	(United Kingdom) Mark Hazell
3	R5	Grand Prix de France Historique	(France) Circuit Paul Ricard	12 June	(United Kingdom) Steve Brooks	(United Kingdom) Jamie Constable	(Switzerland) Nicolas Matile	(United Kingdom) Nick Padmore	**(United Kingdom) Mike Cantillon**	(Germany) Marco Werner
3	R6	Grand Prix de France Historique	(France) Circuit Paul Ricard	13 June		(United Kingdom) Mike Cantillon	(Switzerland) Nicolas Matile	(United Kingdom) Nick Padmore	**(United Kingdom) Mike Cantillon**	(Germany) Marco Werner
4	R7	Silverstone Classic	(United Kingdom) Silverstone Circuit	30 July	(United Kingdom) Michael Lyons	(United Kingdom) Michael Lyons	No finishers	(Austria) Lukas Halusa	**(United Kingdom) Michael Lyons**	No finishers
4	R8	Silverstone Classic	(United Kingdom) Silverstone Circuit	1 August		(United Kingdom) Michael Lyons	No starters	(Austria) Lukas Halusa	**(United Kingdom) Michael Lyons**	(United Kingdom) Mark Hazell
5	R9	Spa Six Hours	(Belgium) Circuit de Spa-Francorchamps	2 October	(United Kingdom) Mike Cantillon	(United Kingdom) Steve Brooks	No entries	(United Kingdom) Nick Padmore	**(United Kingdom) Jamie Constable**	(United Kingdom) Mark Hazell
5	R10	Spa Six Hours	(Belgium) Circuit de Spa-Francorchamps	3 October		(United Kingdom) Mike Cantillon	No entries	(Austria) Lukas Halusa	**(United Kingdom) Mike Cantillon**	(United Kingdom) Mark Hazell
6	R11	Jerez Historic Festival	(Spain) Circuito de Jerez	23 October	(United Kingdom) Mike Cantillon	(United Kingdom) Mike Cantillon	No entries	(United Kingdom) Nick Padmore	**(United Kingdom) Mike Cantillon**	(United Kingdom) Mark Hazell
6	R12	Jerez Historic Festival	(Spain) Circuito de Jerez	24 October		(Belgium) Christophe d'Ansembourg	No entries	**(Germany) Marco Werner**	(United Kingdom) Miles Griffiths	No starters
7	R13	Algarive Classic Festival	(Portugal) Algarve International Circuit	30 October	(Germany) Marco Werner	(United Kingdom) Max Smith-Hilliard	No entries	(United Kingdom) Max Smith-Hilliard	(United Kingdom) Jamie Constable	(United Kingdom) **Nick Padmore**
7	R14	Algarive Classic Festival	(Portugal) Algarve International Circuit	31 October		(Belgium) Christophe d'Ansembourg	No entries	(Belgium) Marc Devis	**(Germany) Marco Werner**	(United Kingdom) Nick Padmore

=== Championships standings ===
Starters	Position	**1st**	**2nd**	**3rd**	**4th**	**5th**	**6th**	**Fastest Lap**
3+	Points	9	6	4	3	2	1	1
2	Points	6	4					1
1	Points	4						1

Pos.	Driver	Chassis	(United Kingdom) DON		(United Kingdom) BRH		(France) LEC		(United Kingdom) SIL		(Belgium) SPA		(Spain) JER		(Portugal) ALG		Points
Stewart Class
1	(Switzerland) Nicolas Matile	Matra MS120B					**12**	16									10
2	(United Kingdom) Judy Lyons	Surtees TS9							**NC**	DNS							1
	(United Kingdom) 'Mr John of B'	Matra MS120C					PO	PO									0
Fittipaldi Class
1	(Austria) Lukas Halusa	McLaren M23	**3**	**4**	**2**	2	5	5	**5**	8	**DNS**	2	8	6	11	8	98
2	(United Kingdom) Nick Padmore	Lotus 77					**2**	3			2	Ret	**4**	13			36
3	(Belgium) Marc Devis	Surtees TS16			6	Ret	DNS	10					Ret	9	10	6	28
4	(United States) Jonathan Holtzman	Tyrrell P34 (replica)			10	8			11	14							20
5	(France) Michel Baudoin	Hesketh 308E					14	17	12	16			Ret	11	14	12	20
6	(United Kingdom) Miles Griffiths	Fittipaldi F5A											7	3			16
7	(United Kingdom) Max Smith-Hilliard	Shadow DN5											12	8	**4**	DNS	16
8	(United Kingdom) Ron Maydon	LEC CRP1	6	8													12
9	(United Kingdom) Philip Hall	Theodore TR1			11	6											9
10	(United Kingdom) Chris Perkins	Surtees TS14	7	Ret	Ret	Ret			Ret	15							8
11	(France) Patrick d'Aubreby	March 761					Ret	7					11	Ret			7
12	(France) Philippe Bonny	Trojan T103					10	14									6
13	(United States) Robert Blain	March 761											Ret	14	DNS	DNS	0
Head Class
1	(United Kingdom) Mike Cantillon	Williams FW07C	**1**	1			1	1	2	2	Ret	1	**1**	12	9	5	73
2	(United Kingdom) Jamie Constable	Tyrrell 011					9	2	3	4	1	7	3	2	1	Ret	44
3	(United Kingdom) Steve Hartley	McLaren MP4/1	**2**	**2**	**1**	1			4	3							43
4	(Germany) Marco Werner	Lotus 81									Ret	DNS	2	1	**3**	1	30
5	(Belgium) Christophe d'Ansembourg	Williams FW07C					4	6			Ret	4	5	7	7	2	28
6	(United Kingdom) Steve Brooks	Lotus 91	4	DNS			**DNS**	DNS	13	5	3	3	9	5	6	Ret	26
7	(New Zealand) Warren Briggs	McLaren M29	Ret	5	3	4			6	7	5	Ret	10	Ret	8	7	25
8	(United Kingdom) Michael Lyons	Ensign N180B							**1**	1							20
9	(Japan) Katsuaki Kubota	Lotus 91											6	4	5	4	14
10	(United Kingdom) Neil Glover	Arrows A5	8	7	9	9			8	11							11
11	(United States) Ken Tyrrell	Tyrrell 011			8	Ret			9	6	8	5					10
12	(United Kingdom) Mark Harrison	Shadow DN9	Ret	Ret	7	7			7	10							9
13	(France) Laurent Fort	Ensign MN181-B					6	11									6
14	(United Kingdom) 'Mr John of B'	Ligier JS11/15					7	8									6
15	(United Kingdom) Paul Tattersall	Ensign N179					11	15	10	13	9	8	14	10	12	10	6
16	(France) Vincent Rivet	March 811					Ret	13									1
17	(United Kingdom) Richard Hope	Alfa Romeo 182													13	11	0
	(France) Evens Stievenart	Tyrrell 010					DNS	DNS									0
	(Monaco) Frédéric Lajoux	Arrows A1B					DNS	DNS									0
	(Germany) Thomas Steinke	Alfa Romeo 182									DNS	DNS					0
Lauda Class
1	(United Kingdom) Mark Hazell	Williams FW08C	**5**	**3**	4	3	DNS	DNS	**Ret**	9	**4**	6	**13**	DNS	Ret	9	62
2	(Germany) Georg Hallau	Theodore N183					8	9			6	9					20
3	(United Kingdom) Ian Simmonds	Tyrrell 012	Ret	6	**5**	5			Ret	12							18
4	(Germany) Marco Werner	Lotus 92					**3**	4									14
5	(United Kingdom) Nick Padmore	Lotus 92													**1**	3	14
6	(Switzerland) Felix Haas	Lotus 92									7	10					8
Invitation class drivers ineligible for points
	(France) Alain Giradet	McLaren M10B					13	12									
	(United Kingdom) Steve Farthing	Lola T332											15	Ret			
	(France) Gislain Genecand	Surtees TS5A					Ret	18									
Pos.	Driver	Chassis	(United Kingdom) DON		(United Kingdom) BRH		(France) LEC		(United Kingdom) SIL		(Belgium) SPA		(Spain) JER		(Portugal) ALG		Points

Key
Colour	Result
Gold	Winner
Silver	Second place
Bronze	Third place
Green	Other points position
Blue	Other classified position
Blue	Not classified, finished (NC)
Purple	Not classified, retired (Ret)
Red	Did not qualify (DNQ)
Red	Did not pre-qualify (DNPQ)
Black	Disqualified (DSQ)
White	Did not start (DNS)
White	Race cancelled (C)
Blank	Did not practice (DNP)
Blank	Excluded (EX)
Blank	Did not arrive (DNA)
Blank	Withdrawn (WD)
Blank	Did not enter (cell empty)
Text formatting	Meaning
**Bold**	Pole position
Italics	Fastest lap
