= March 2-4-0 =

Formula One racing car

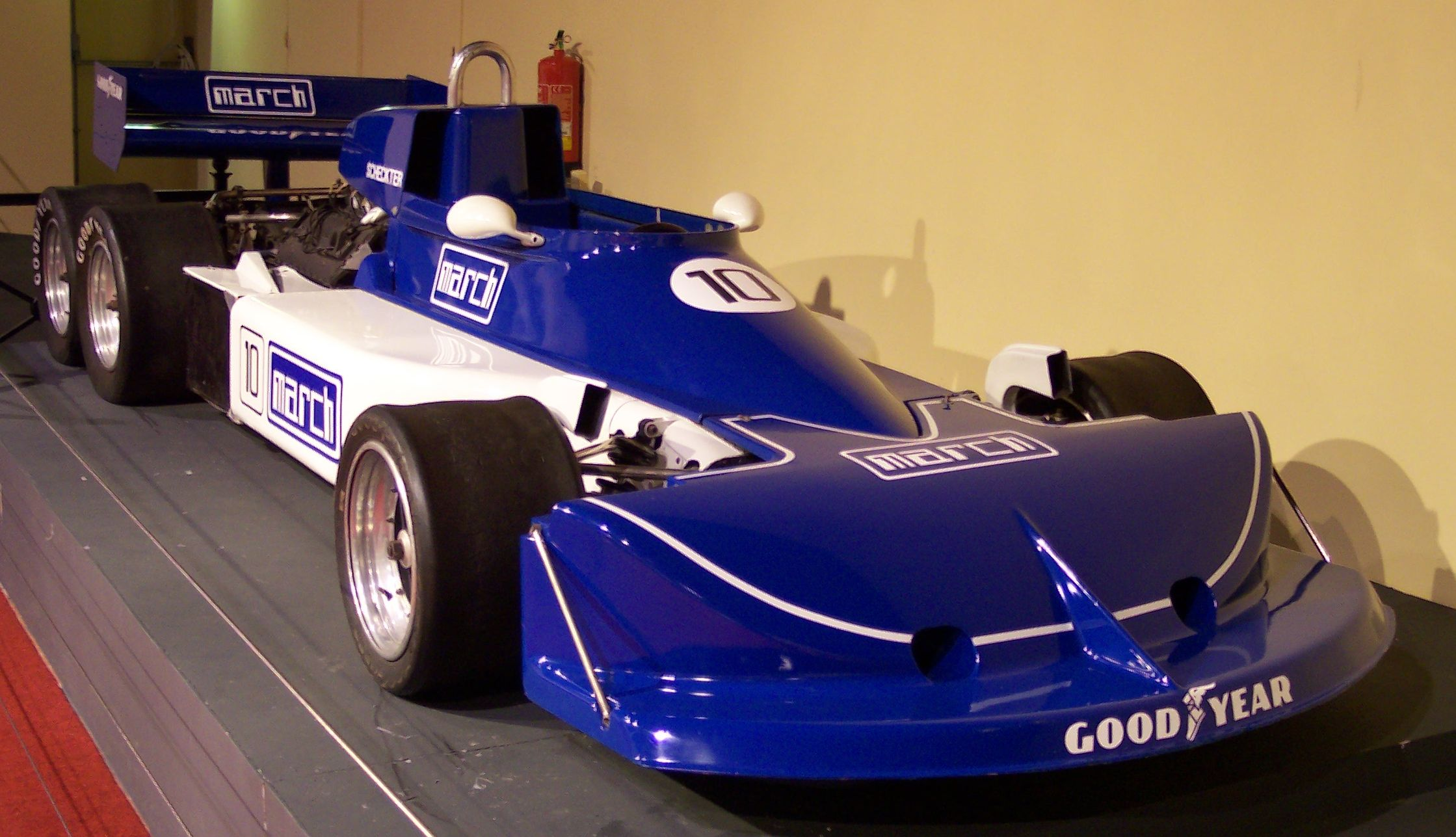
March 2-4-0

The March 2-4-0 was an experimental six-wheeled Formula One racing car built by the March Engineering company of Bicester, UK. It was constructed in late 1976 and tested in early 1977.

The car followed on from the successful use by Tyrrell Racing of a six-wheeled car, the Tyrrell P34, in Formula One racing. However, the engineering concept behind the 2-4-0 was quite different.

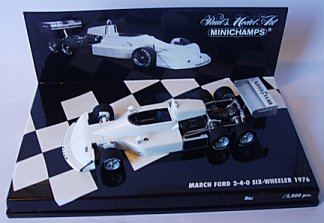
Minichamps 1:43 scale model of the March 2-4-0

== Tyrrell P34: four wheels at the front ==
The front wheels of an open-wheeled F1 car generate aerodynamic drag. The thinking behind the Tyrrell P34 was that this drag effect could be reduced by using smaller diameter tyres at the front. At the time, conventional F1 front wheels would measure around 16" (40 cm) diameter but Tyrrell planned to use just 10" (25 cm) diameter wheels. The corresponding loss of front-end grip was overcome by incorporating two front wheels per side thus actually increasing grip as well as decreasing drag. The design incorporated a system whereby all four front wheels could steer the car.

The P34 was reasonably successful with the two cars taking a memorable 1–2 in the 1976 Swedish Grand Prix. The Tyrrell team also finished 3rd and 4th overall in the championship. The car was less successful in 1977 however and the idea was dropped. Reasons given were that although Goodyear had manufactured special tyres for the car, the tyre company had failed to match the development work on them compared to the normal sized tyres used by other teams. With all four front wheels steering the car, Tyrrell also found that the P34's complex four-wheel front suspension assembly added a lot of weight to the car.

== March 2-4-0: four wheels at the rear ==
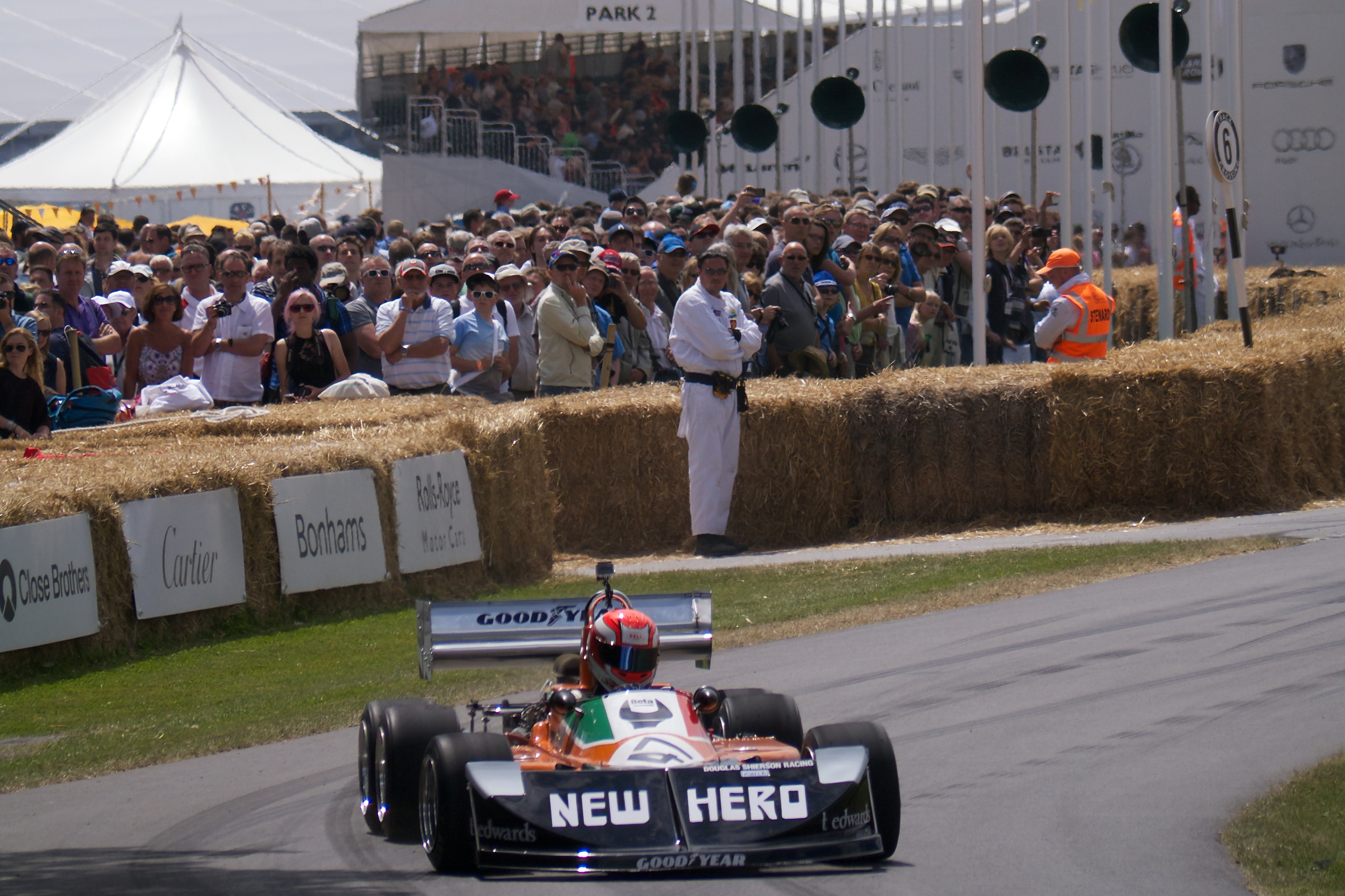
A March 2-4-0 at the 2014 Goodwood Festival of Speed

At March Engineering in Bicester, designer Robin Herd had watched the P34 experiment closely and, by late 1976, had come to the conclusion that the 'four front wheels' concept might have been a blind alley. In his assessment, the improved aerodynamics at the front were largely negated by the rear tyres which at 24" (60 cm) diameter would still have accounted for 30 to 40% of the car's total drag. He also felt that with a modern rear wheel drive F1 car, the extra grip could be employed more usefully for the driven wheels.

With this in mind, Herd drew up plans for a six-wheeled car with four driven wheels at the rear and all of the wheels the same 16" diameter. His theory was that with all six tyres the same size as the regular F1 front tyre, the car would not only be slimmer than normal F1 cars but would possess improved aerodynamic performance at the rear with much cleaner air passing over the wing. Four driven wheels would also mean better traction and, unlike the Tyrrell, there would be no problem with tyre development since the car would use exactly the same rubber as a conventional F1 car.

Herd called this concept '2-4-0', following the Whyte notation used to describe railway rolling stock: two wheels leading, four driven wheels, zero trailing wheels.

== Design, construction & development ==
With the apparent technical advantages of this concept laid out, Max Mosley (Herd's partner at March Cars) gave the go-ahead for a prototype to be built. Mosley noted that the P34 had generated a lot of additional publicity for Tyrrell and, aside from the technical merits, believed a March six-wheeler would be an attractive package to present to potential sponsors.

Unfortunately, the March team was at something of a low point financially during 1976/77 and the development costs of an all-new six-wheel car would be high. As a compromise measure, a 1976-design Cosworth DFV-powered March 761 was adapted by team mechanic Wayne Eckersley in a quiet corner of the Bicester factory. Existing parts from the factory stores were used wherever possible.

A key feature of a car with four driven wheels at the rear would be the transmission. An ingenious gearbox design was required to minimise any frictional power losses. It would also have to be stronger (and hence heavier) to counteract the higher torsional and flexural stresses that the close-coupled four-wheel-drive system would generate.

Herd's original design for the gearbox casing recognised these factors and specified a series of strengthening ribs to counteract the additional loading. However, at some point in development it was decided that the casting would be very complex and expensive to produce. By way of a cost-cutting measure, some of the ribs were duly removed from the drawing.

In fact, the design utilised a standard Hewland F1 gearbox for the first axle. To this, the new casing, gears and an extended pinion for the second axle were fitted. Practically, this meant that any 761 chassis could be easily adapted should the concept prove workable.

Once the 2-4-0 was partially built, the press were invited to the factory in late November 1976 for a viewing of the hitherto 'secret' project. The unveiling generated a huge amount of interest with articles in several motor sport magazines plus a photograph on the cover of the following week's Autosport magazine (dated 2 December 1976).

Simultaneously, the company also outlined plans for a full running demonstration and developmental testing at Silverstone circuit scheduled for a fortnight later.

== Testing ==
The first test took place at Silverstone in late 1976. Unfortunately, on the initial lap the gearbox casing flexed and the gears became unmeshed. No immediate solution could be found and so the rear crown wheel and pinion were removed for the rest of the day's testing. Effectively the 2-4-0 had become a two-wheel drive car again. Fortunately for March, it was a wet day at the circuit and the driver Howden Ganley could not push the car too fast. Consequently, the test was reported as a success by the media.

The problems on the first lap highlighted the fact that the car needed a new, stronger gearbox casing and a serious development program. Unable to afford the time and resources that this would require, the 2-4-0 project was de-prioritised by the company.

In February 1977, the car — now fitted with a stronger gearbox — ran again at Silverstone with driver Ian Scheckter at the wheel. Although it was another wet day, the car was run up and down the Hangar Straight and, with four driven wheels, Scheckter reported that the traction was 'incredible'. Additionally, the events of the day again made Autosport magazine's front page (dated 10 February 1977).

But this was the end of 2-4-0's F1 development history. On its reappearance at the Belgium GP in June, the converted 761 chassis had been reconfigured as a conventional four-wheeler.

== Myth of appearance at the Brazilian GP ==
In August 2002 an article appeared on the 8W website that claimed, on the basis of an incorrectly identified photograph, that the 2-4-0 may have appeared in practice for the 1977 Brazilian Grand Prix at the end of January. The photograph in question actually showed the car testing at Silverstone in February 1977 and it is clear from contemporary reports of the Grand Prix that the 2-4-0 was not present. The author of the 8W article has now corrected the error but not before it was used as a source for a number of other websites.

== Hill climbing ==
In 1979 the 2-4-0 concept was revived by British Hillclimb specialist Roy Lane. Lane had bought a March 771 chassis and with Robin Herd's blessing was loaned the improved 2-4-0 transmission unit. The fact that the 2-4-0 was originally an inexpensive workshop conversion of the standard March F1 chassis meant that Lane was easily able to fit the unit to his car.

Taking advantage of four-wheel traction, Lane won several British hill-climbing events in the 771/2-4-0 that year with the first win at Wiscombe Park in May. However, over the season the car proved troublesome and Lane eventually switched back to the four-wheel configuration.

== Legacy ==
Despite only limited success in short duration racing events, the 2-4-0 concept was never disproven. It is possible that if a weight-shedding program had been pursued (possibly using stronger and lighter materials) and the car's suspect handling improved, the 2-4-0 could have proved successful in F1. The concept would certainly have adapted well to ground effect which was the coming technology in Grand Prix racing.

The Williams team seem to have agreed with Herd's theory because they built and tested two 2-4-0–style six-wheeled cars – designated the FW07D and FW08B. However, any hopes of seeing a 2-4-0–style race car compete in a Grand Prix were dashed when the FIA banned all four-wheel drive systems in this category. The FW08B remains on display in the Williams's factory museum.

The March 2-4-0 story was not without a silver lining for the company that built it. As Max Mosley had surmised, the car was indeed a huge publicity magnet. Additionally, significant income was generated for the team when the Scalextric company purchased the rights to produce and market a best-selling 1/32 scale slot-racing replica.

As of May 2013, the March 2-4-0 was housed in the Louwman collection in The Hague, the Netherlands, and it was raced at the 2014 Oulton Park Gold Cup.

== See also ==
- Tyrrell P34
- Ferrari 312T6
- Williams FW07D
- Williams FW08B
