= 1997 Historic Formula One Championship =

Seasons
- ← 1996 1998 →

The 1997 Historic Formula One Championship (also known as Thoroughbred Grand Prix) was the third season of the Historic Formula One Championship. It began at Silverstone on May 5 and ended at Brands Hatch on October 19.

It was won by Bob Berridge driving a RAM 01.

== Calendar ==
| Round | Circuit | Dates | Race winner | Car |
|---|---|---|---|---|
| 1 | (United Kingdom) Brands Hatch | May 5 | (United Kingdom) Ian Giles | Brabham BT49 |
| 2 | (Italy) Monza | May 18 | (United Kingdom) Ian Giles | Brabham BT49 |
| 3 | (United Kingdom) Donington Park | June 1 | (United Kingdom) John Wilson | Williams FW08 |
| 4 | (Germany) Nürburgring | July 13 | (United Kingdom) Bob Berridge | RAM 01 |
| 5 | (Belgium) Zolder | August 3 | (United Kingdom) Bob Berridge | RAM 01 |
| 6 | (Germany) Nürburgring | August 10 | (United Kingdom) Bob Berridge | RAM 01 |
| 7 | (Czech Republic) Brno | September 14 | (United Kingdom) Bob Berridge | RAM 01 |
| 8 | (United Kingdom) Brands Hatch | October 19 | (United Kingdom) Bob Berridge | RAM 01 |
