= 1996 Historic Formula One Championship =

Seasons
- ← 1995 1997 →

The 1996 Historic Formula One Championship was the second season of the Historic Formula One Championship. It began at Donington Park on May 5 and ended at Brno on September 29.

It was won by Michael Schryver driving a Lotus 72 despite not winning any of the five races.

== Calendar ==
Round	Circuit	Dates	Race winner	Car
1	(United Kingdom) Donington Park	5 May	(United Kingdom) Mike Littlewood	Williams-Cosworth FW07B
2	(Sweden) Anderstorp	9 June	(United Kingdom) Bob Berridge	RAM-Cosworth 01
3	(Germany) Nürburgring	23 June	(United Kingdom) Bob Berridge	RAM-Cosworth 01
4	(United Kingdom) Donington Park	1 September	(United States) Steve Hitchins	Lotus-Cosworth 78
5	(Czech Republic) Brno	29 September	(United Kingdom) Simon Hadfield	Brabham-Cosworth BT49
