= 1995 Historic Formula One Championship =

Seasons
- ← none 1996 →

The 1995 Historic Formula One Championship (also known as Thoroughbred Grand Prix) was the first season of the Historic Formula One Championship. It began at Donington Park on May 21 and ended at Brno on October 1.

It was won by Martin Stretton driving a Tyrrell 005 despite not winning any of the five races.

== Calendar ==
Round	Circuit	Dates	Race winner	Car
1	(United Kingdom) Donington Park	21 May	(United Kingdom) Mike Littlewood	Shadow-Cosworth DN8
2	(Germany) Nürburgring	25 June	(United Kingdom) Sean Walker	Lotus-Cosworth 87B
3	(United Kingdom) Brands Hatch	2 July	(United Kingdom) John Wilson	Williams FW08C
4	(United Kingdom) Donington Park	3 September	(United Kingdom) Sean Walker	Lotus-Cosworth 87B
5	(Czech Republic) Brno	1 October	(United Kingdom) Sean Walker	Lotus-Cosworth 87B
