= 2012 Historic Formula One Championship =

Seasons
- ← 2011 2013 →

The 2012 Historic Formula One Championship was the 18th season of the Historic Formula One Championship. It began at Donington Park on April 14.

It was won by Joaquin Folch driving a Williams FW08.

== Calendar ==
Round	Circuit	Dates	Winner
1	(Germany) Hockenheim	14 April	(Spain) Joaquin Folch
1	(Germany) Hockenheim	15 April	(United Kingdom) Richard Eyre
2	(Belgium) Spa-Francorchamps	26 May	(Spain) Joaquin Folch
2	(Belgium) Spa-Francorchamps	27 May	(Spain) Joaquin Folch
3	(San Marino) Imola	9 June	(Spain) Joaquin Folch
3	(San Marino) Imola	10 June	(Spain) Joaquin Folch
4	(United Kingdom) Silverstone	7 July	(United Kingdom) Steve Hartley
5	(France) Paul Ricard	6 October	(Spain) Joaquin Folch
5	(France) Paul Ricard	7 October	(United Kingdom) Richard Eyre
6	(Spain) Jerez	October	(Spain) Joaquin Folch
