= FIA Masters Historic Formula One Championship =

Single seater racing championship

FIA Masters Historic Formula One
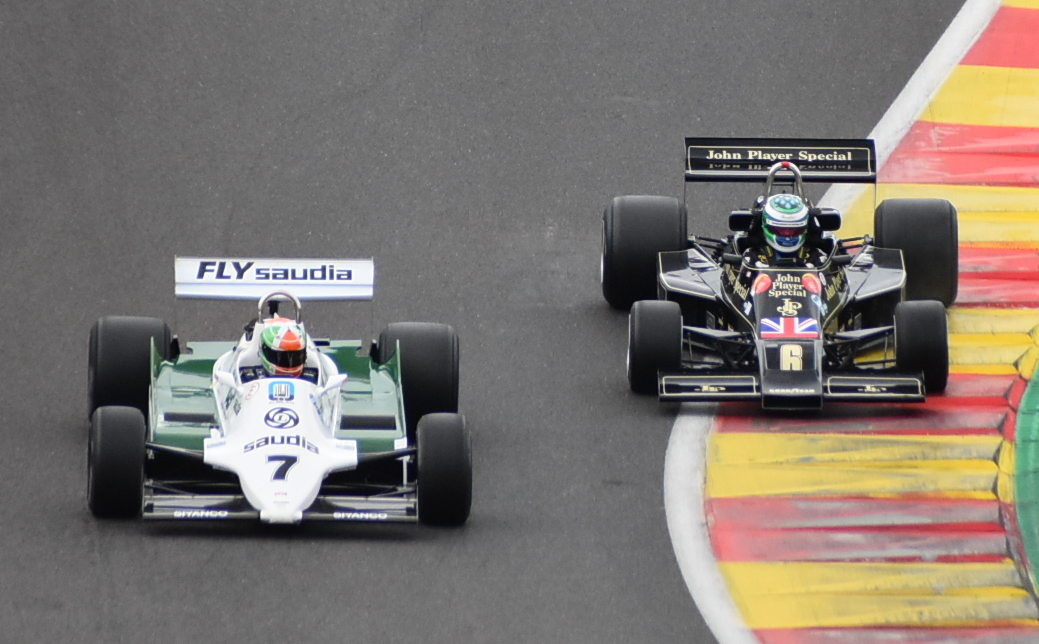
- 1982 Williams FW07C and 1976 Lotus 77
- Category: Single seater
- Country: Europe
- Inaugural season: 2013; 13 years ago
- Tyre suppliers: Avon, Dunlop
- Drivers' champion: Nick Padmore (Lotus 77); Ken Tyrell (Tyrrell 011)
- Official website: www.mastershistoricracing.com

The FIA Masters Historic Formula One Championship is a championship that has old Formula One cars from "the golden era", which caters for 3-litre engine Formula 1 cars, from 1966 to 1985.

The Historic Formula One Championship, previously known as the Thoroughbred Grand Prix Championship, was a championship for Formula One cars built during the 1960s, 1970s and 1980s. This championship was sanctioned by the Fédération Internationale de l'Automobile (FIA), the motor sport's world governing body. The championship was recognised by the FIA in 1994 as the only official FIA Historic Formula One Championship and its first season was in 1995. In 2013, the series was absorbed by Masters Racing to create the FIA Masters Historic Formula One Championship.

Masters Historic Racing is a United Kingdom based organisation, headed by entrepreneur Ron Maydon, which also operates a number of other historic race categories, including a sister American series open to the same cars as the FIA Masters Historic Formula One Championship.

The 2017 season was marred by the death of 61 year-old French driver David Ferrer at Zandvoort. Ferrer was driving a March 701.

== Circuits ==
The season schedule includes six circuits in 2023: Hockenheimring, Brands Hatch, Zandvoort, Silverstone, Spa-Francorchamps, and Algarve.

== Regulations ==
=== Before 2013 ===
The championship was split into four classes according to the vehicle's age and technical specification.

Class	Vehicle eligibility
A	1966–1971 Formula One cars
B	Post–1971 non-ground effect Formula One cars
C	Post–1971 ground effect Formula One cars
D	Post–1971 flat-bottom Formula One cars

The HFO Competition featured classic Grand Prix racing cars from the 20-year period between 1966 and 1985. During that period, there were design innovations and regulatory changes that resulted in significant performance differences and a vast speed differential between the earlier cars such as the Tyrrell 001, and the later machines such as the Tyrrell 012 and Brabham BT49.

Drivers score points within their particular car's class and all have the chance to claim the overall FIA trophy at the end of the season.

==== Points ====
Effectively, there are four competitions going on within every race and each provides points for the driver based on his or her placing in the car's class and the number of competing cars in that class.

Number of starters in the class	Points awarded					
Number of starters in the class	1st	2nd	3rd	4th	5th	6th
>3 starters	9 points	6 points	4 points	3 points	2 points	1 point
2–3 starters	6 points	4 points	–	–	–	–
1 starter	4 points	–	–	–	–	–

An additional point will be awarded to the drivers who achieve the fastest lap in each class during the race.

==== Championship awards ====
The Champion is the driver who scores the greatest points total, regardless of the class in which he or she competes, and a driver can switch classes during the season. In addition to the overall champion, awards also go to drivers with the highest total of points in each class excluding the overall champion, as follows:

Historic Formula One Historic Cup – The competitor scoring the highest number of points in Class A.

Historic Formula One Classic Cup – The competitor scoring the highest number of points in Class B.

Historic Formula One Cup – The competitor scoring the highest number of points in Class C.

Historic Formula One Sporting Cup – The competitor scoring the highest number of points in Class D.

These are all FIA awards that are presented at an official FIA Historic Awards event.

==== Additional awards ====
HFO also presents its own awards at a slightly less formal and usually much more boisterous event as follows:

The Chairman's Trophy – Introduced in 2009 by Tony Smith, this is awarded to the competitor who, in the chairman's opinion, best exhibits the "Spirit of the Championship".

The Geoff Richardson Trophy – Provided by an engine builder, the trophy is awarded to the best newcomer.

The Nicholson McLaren Trophy – Provided by another engine builder. This 'trophy' is awarded to the 'best' team.

The Ensign Trophy – Provided by the former CEO of HFO, Mike Wheatley, who is something of an Ensign fan, having 'raced' an example in HFO very successfully. Although never a winner, the marque was at its peak during the Class B period and this trophy goes to the winner of Class B.

The Colin Chapman Trophy – provided by Clive Chapman and Classic Team Lotus. It is hard to imagine any historic category without a Colin Chapman Trophy but, as in HFO's case, it is equally hard to determine which period it might be applied to since Chapman was responsible for so many 'innovations'.

After considering that Class C covers the period when ground effects, carbon fibre chassis and the controversial twin chassis Lotus Type 88 all emerged from Chapman's expertise, it was agreed that this trophy would go to the winner of Class C.

=== From 2013 ===
The regulations from 2013 are:

- Cars using Cosworth DFV engines must have an engine limiter of 10,000 rpm
- All cars must be presented with a current FIA Historic Technical Passport and be presented in that specification.
- All drivers must be in possession of an International level racing licence.
- Cars must be classed into the following categories in order to enter a race:
  - Jackie Stewart class: Formula One cars built between 1966 and 1972
  - Emerson Fittipaldi class: Formula One cars built between 1973 and 1977
  - Patrick Head class: Post–1978, ground effect Formula One cars
  - Niki Lauda class: Post–1978, flat bottomed Formula One cars
- Characteristics of events:
  - Friday: Untimed Practice (If Available)
  - Friday: Timed Qualifying
  - Saturday: Race 1
  - Sunday: Race 2
- At the end of the championship, there will be two winners, one for the Fittipaldi/Stewart class, and one for the Head/Lauda class.
- Points:
  - For classes with 3 or more starters in the class: 9–6–4–3–2–1
  - For classes with fewer than 3 starters in the class: 6–4
  - For classes with 1 starter in the class: 4
- Drivers must complete 75% of the race in order to be classified

== Champions ==
=== Before 2013 ===
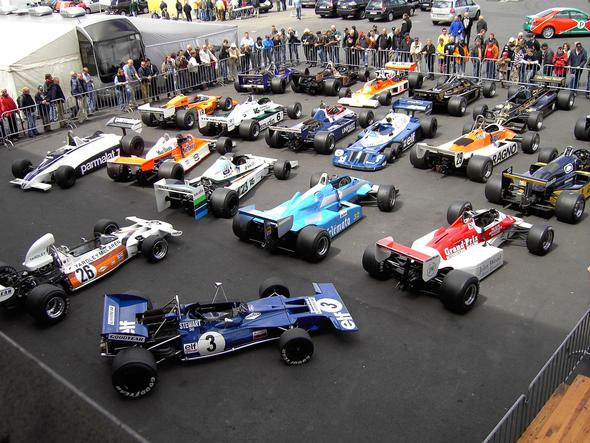
The parc fermé of the Thoroughbred Grand Prix Championship at DAMC 05-Oldtimer Festival Nürburgring in June 1995.

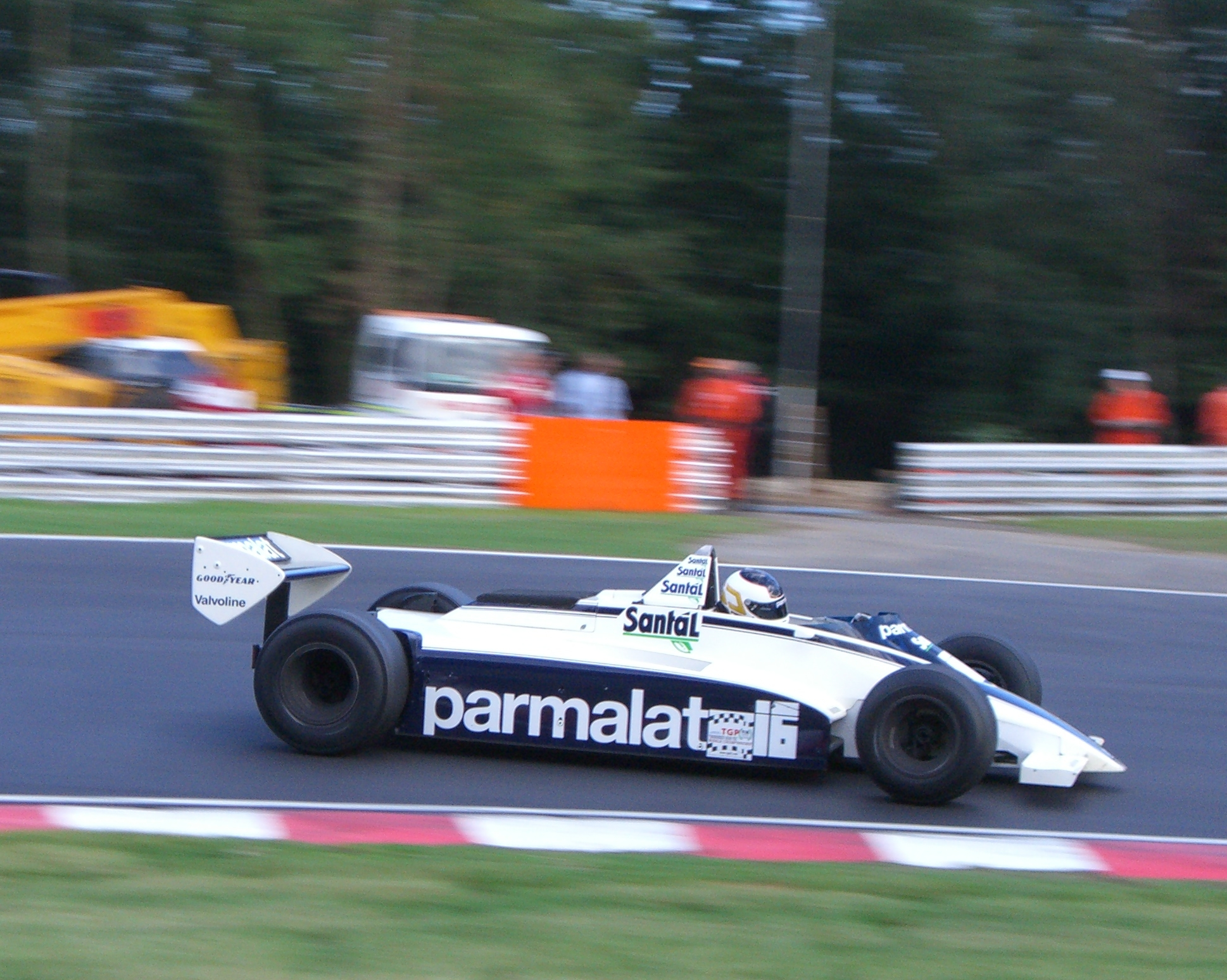
Brabham BT49D driven by Christian Gläsel at a Thoroughbred Grand Prix race at Brands Hatch in September 2005.

Season	Champion	Car
1995	(United Kingdom) Martin Stretton	Tyrrell 005
1996	(United Kingdom) Michael Schryver	Lotus 72
1997	(United Kingdom) Bob Berridge	RAM 01
1998	(United Kingdom) Bob Berridge	Williams FW08
1999	(United Kingdom) Bob Berridge	Williams FW08
2000	(United Kingdom) Martin Stretton	Tyrrell P34
2001	(United Kingdom) John Bladon	Surtees TS9
2002	(United Kingdom) Mike Whatley	Ensign N175
2003	(United Kingdom) Mike Wrigley	Tyrrell 012
2004	(Portugal) Rodrigo Gallego	March 761
2005	(Germany) Christian Gläsel	Brabham BT49
2006	(United Kingdom) Steve Hartley	Arrows A6
2007	(United Kingdom) Steve Hartley	Arrows A6
2008	(Italy) Mauro Pane	Tyrrell P34
2009	(United Kingdom) Bobby Verdon-Roe	McLaren M26
2010	(United Kingdom) Peter Meyrick	March 761
2011	(United States) John Delane	Tyrrell 002
2012	(Spain) Joaquin Folch	Brabham BT49C

=== After 2013 ===
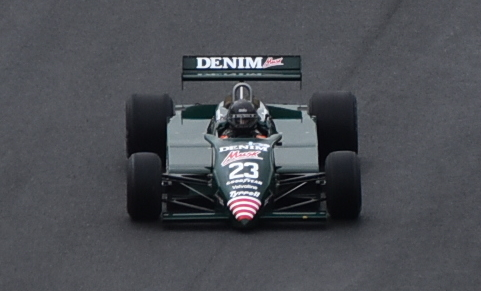
2023 Head/Lauda class champion, Ken Tyrrell (Tyrrell 011)

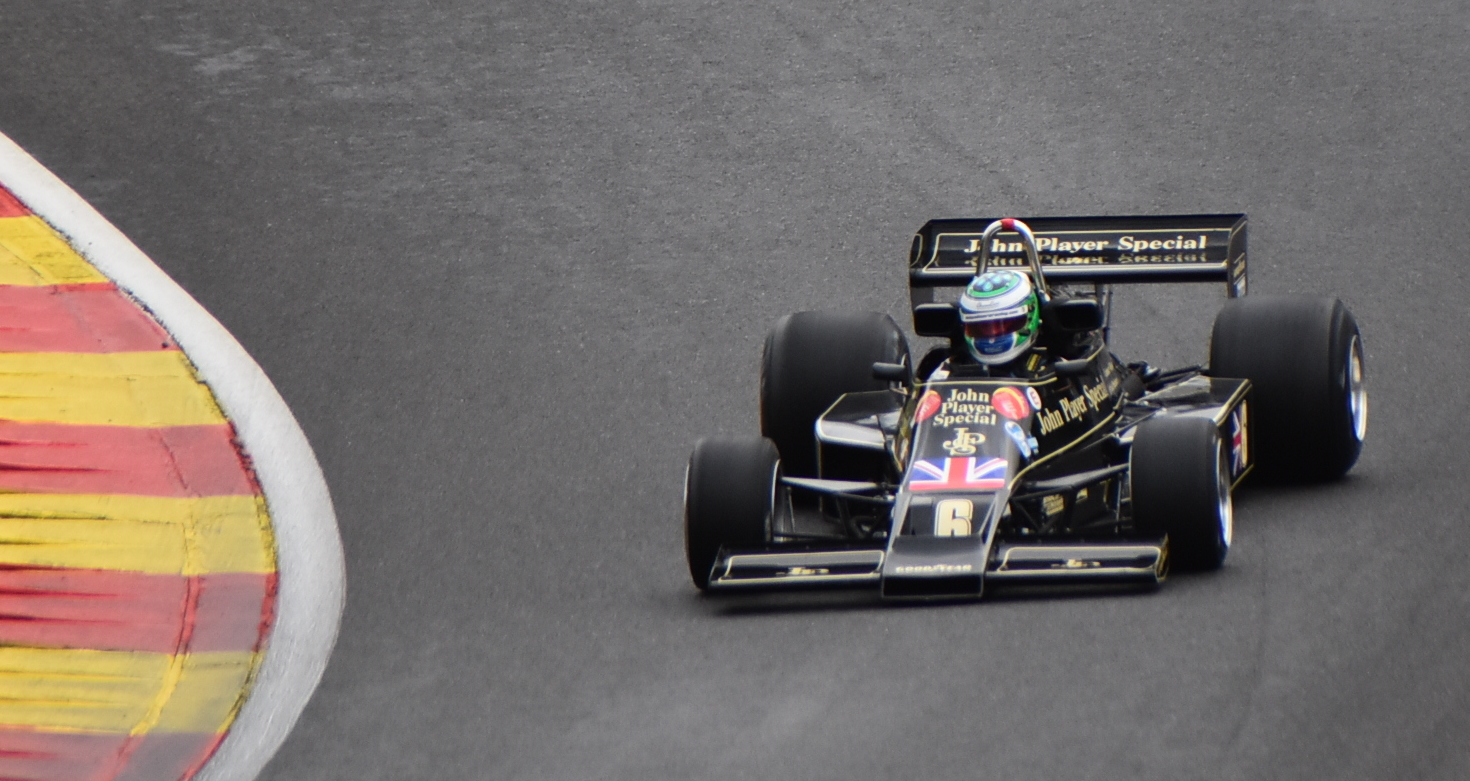
2023 Fittipaldi/Stewart class champion Nick Padmore (Lotus 77)

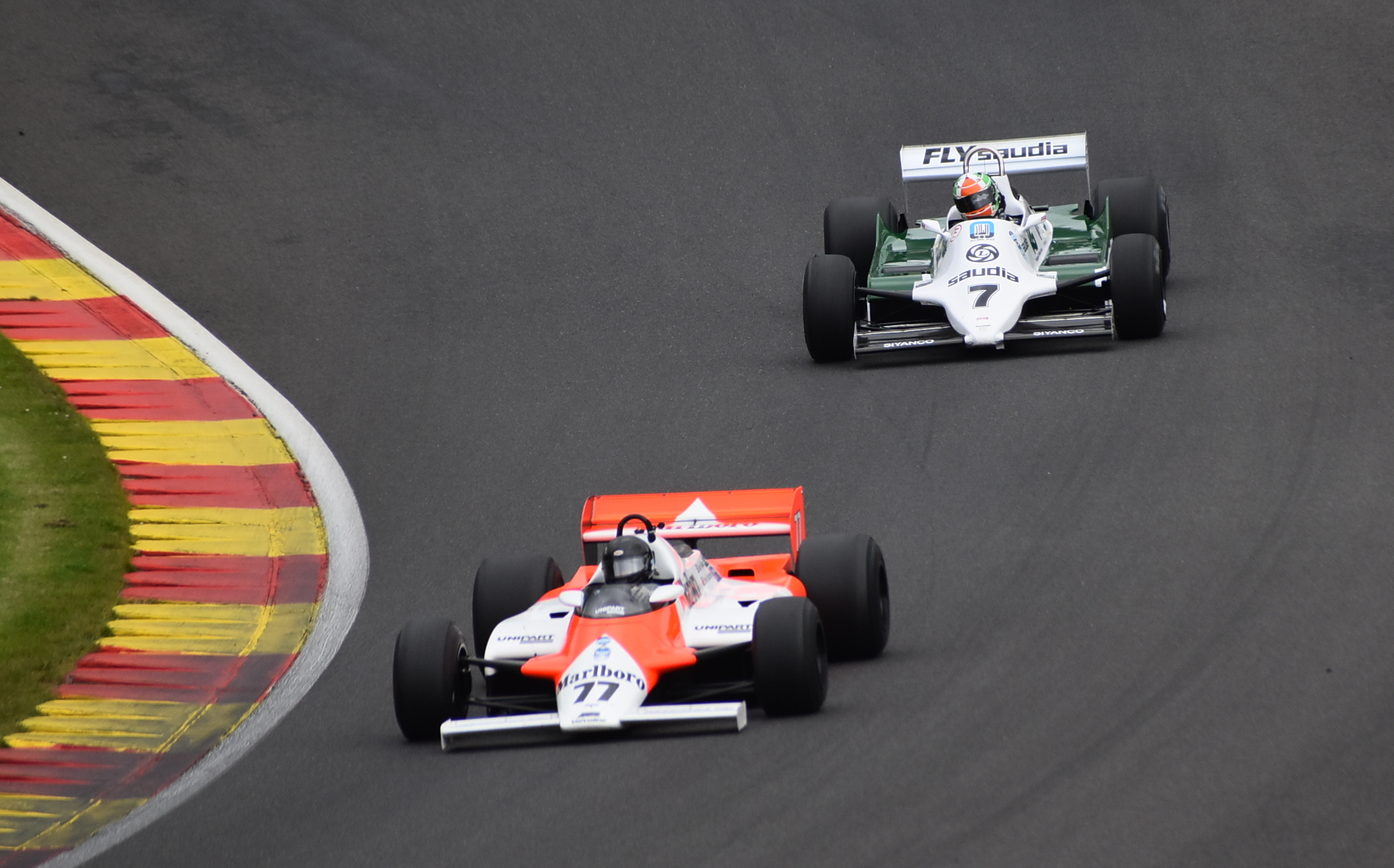
2022 Head/Lauda class champion Steve Hartley (McLaren MP4/1) in front of 2021 Head/Lauda class champion Mike Cantillon (Williams FW07C)

Season	Champion	Car
2013	Fittipaldi/Stewart: (United States) John Delane	Tyrrell 002
2013	Head/Lauda: (United Kingdom) Greg Thornton	Lotus 92
2014	Fittipaldi/Stewart: (Switzerland) Manfredo Rossi di Montelera	Brabham BT42
2014	Head/Lauda: (United Kingdom) Steve Hartley	Arrows A4
2015	Fittipaldi/Stewart: (United Kingdom) Nick Padmore	Surtees TS9B / Lotus 77
2015	Head/Lauda: (United Kingdom) Andy Wolfe	Tyrrell 011
2016	Fittipaldi/Stewart: (United Kingdom) Michael Lyons	Hesketh 308E / McLaren M26
2016	Head/Lauda: (United Kingdom) Nick Padmore	Williams FW07C
2017	Fittipaldi/Stewart: (United Kingdom) Max Smith-Hilliard	Shadow DN5 / Fittipaldi F5A
2017	Head/Lauda: (United Kingdom) Michael Lyons	Williams FW07B
2018	Fittipaldi/Stewart: (United Kingdom) Greg Thornton	Lotus 77 / March 761
2018	Head/Lauda: (United Kingdom) Nick Padmore	Williams FW07C
2019	Fittipaldi/Stewart: (United Kingdom) Henry Fletcher	March 761
2019	Head/Lauda: (Italy) Matteo Ferrer-Aza	Ligier JS11/15
2020	Cancelled due to COVID-19 pandemic	
2021	Fittipaldi/Stewart: (Austria) Lukas Halusa	McLaren M23
2021	Head/Lauda: (United Kingdom) Mike Cantillon	Williams FW07C
2022	Fittipaldi/Stewart: (France) Patrick d’Aubreby	March 761
2022	Head/Lauda: (United Kingdom) Steve Hartley	McLaren MP4/1
2023	Fittipaldi/Stewart: (United Kingdom) Nick Padmore	Lotus 77
2023	Head/Lauda: (United States) Ken Tyrrell	Tyrrell 011

== See also ==
- BOSS GP, a championship featuring historic Formula One cars built after 1996.
- Historic Grand Prix of Monaco, an event open to Formula One cars built before 1980.
