= Tyrrell P34 =

Formula One race car campaigned 1976-1977

Tyrrell P34 Tyrrell P34B
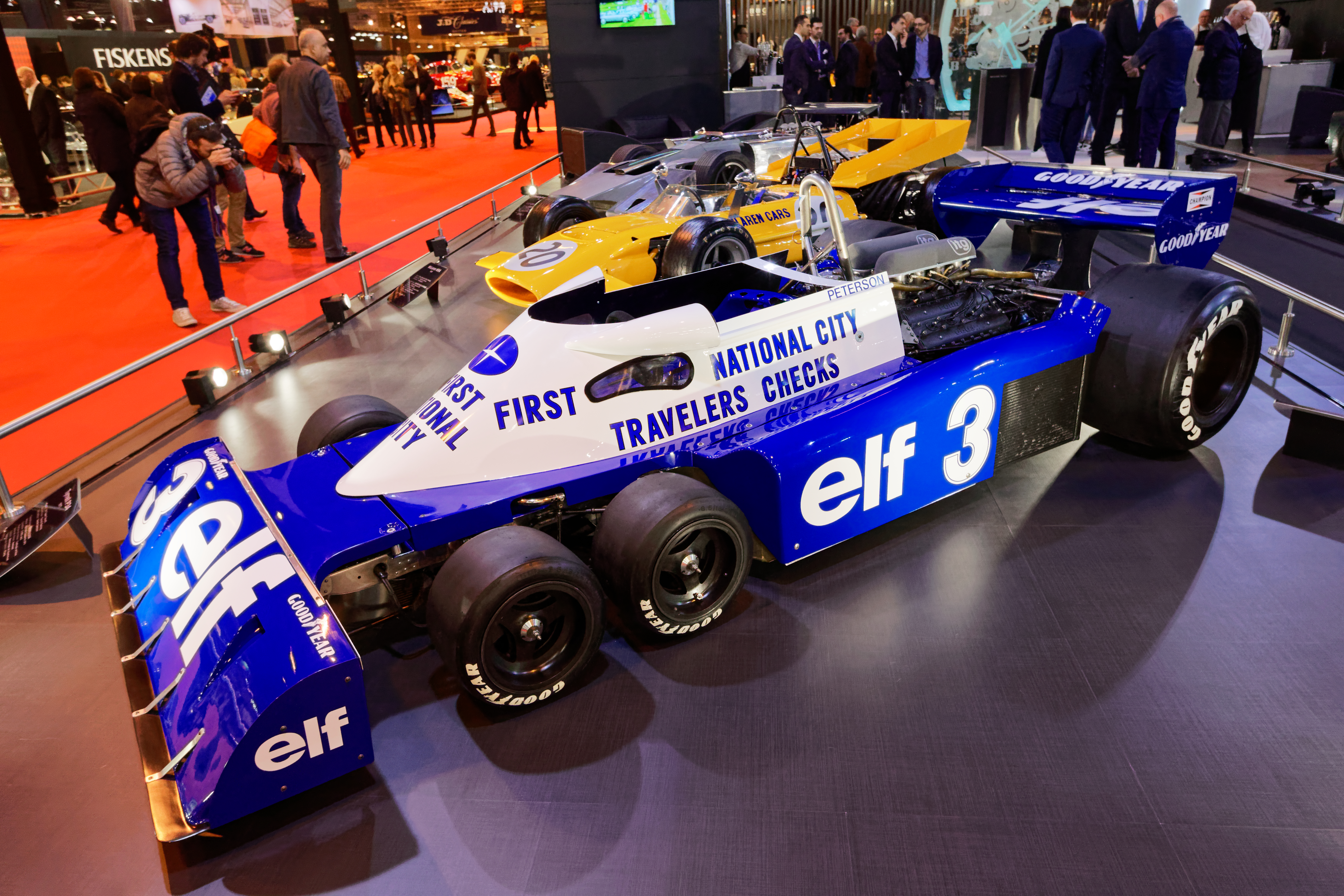
- A 1977-specification Tyrrell P34B
- Category: Formula One
- Constructor: Tyrrell Racing Organisation
- Designer: Derek Gardner
- Predecessor: 007
- Successor: 008

Technical specifications
- Chassis: Aluminium monocoque
- Suspension (front): Double wishbone, coil springs over dampers, anti-roll bar
- Suspension (rear): Double wishbone, radius arms, coil springs over dampers, anti-roll bar
- Axle track: Front: 1,234 mm (48.6 in); Rear: 1,473 mm (58.0 in)
- Wheelbase: 2,453 mm (96.6 in)
- Engine: Ford-Cosworth DFV, 2,993 cc (182.6 cu in), 90° V8, NA, mid-engine, longitudinally mounted
- Transmission: Hewland FG400: 1976: 5-speed; 1977: 6-speed; manual transmission, ZF differential
- Weight: 1976: 595 kg (1,312 lb); 1977: 620 kg (1,370 lb)
- Fuel: Elf
- Tyres: Goodyear

Competition history
- Notable entrants: Elf Team Tyrrell
- Notable drivers: 3. (South Africa) Jody Scheckter; 3. (Sweden) Ronnie Peterson; 4. (France) Patrick Depailler
- Debut: 1976 Spanish Grand Prix
Races	Wins	Podiums	Poles	F/Laps
30	1	14	1	3
- Teams' Championships: 0
- Constructors' Championships: 0
- Drivers' Championships: 0
- Unless otherwise stated, all data refer to Formula One World Championship Grands Prix only.

The Tyrrell P34 (Project 34), commonly known as the "six-wheeler", was a Formula One (F1) race car designed by Derek Gardner, Tyrrell's chief designer. The car used four specially manufactured 10-inch diameter (254 mm) wheels and tyres at the front, with two ordinary-sized wheels at the back. Along with the Brabham BT46B "fancar" developed in 1978, the six-wheeled Tyrrell was one of the most radical entries ever to succeed in F1 competition and has been called the most recognisable design in the history of world motorsports.

The P34 was introduced in September 1975 and began racing in the 1976 season. It proved successful and led other teams to begin design of six-wheeled platforms of their own. Changes to the design made for the 1977 season made it uncompetitive, and the concept was abandoned for Tyrrell's 1978 season. The other six-wheeled designs ended development, and F1 rules later stipulated that cars must have four wheels in total. The cars later had some success in various "classics" race events, but today are museum pieces.

== Design ==
For the mid-1970s, F1 stipulated that the maximum width of the front wing was 1.5 m. Considering the needed room for the driver's feet, the steering mechanism, suspension and the normal front tyre size, this meant the front tyres projected above and out to the sides of the wing. P34's basic concept was to use a tyre that would be small enough to fit entirely behind the wing. This would have two effects: one would be to lower overall drag and thus improve speed on straights, and the other was to clean up overall aerodynamics so the rear wing would receive cleaner airflow.

However, given the space limitations, such a tyre would have to be quite small; in the final design it was 10 inches (250 mm) in diameter. This had too small a contact patch to offer reasonable cornering performance, which led to the use of four wheels instead of two. Adding more wheels also had the advantage of offering more total brake area. The downside was increased complexity of the steering system and a physically larger suspension system. The steering complexity was solved by connecting only the front pair of wheels to the steering wheel and connecting the rear set to the front with a bell crank. Although this was initially considered to be a problem area, a blogger, Joel Rosinsky, later declared: "The steering is so gentle and absolutely free of reaction that you might have thought it was power-assisted!"

The new design was unveiled at the Heathrow Hotel in late September 1975. The car was initially kept under a tarpaulin with hoops over the wheels to make it look conventional, leading to astonishment when the tarp was pulled off. Some in the audience were convinced that the design was a publicity stunt. The car first took to the track at Silverstone on 8 October 1975, and, after more tests, Tyrrell decided to build two more examples with a slightly longer wheelbase to race in the 1976 season.

== Race history ==
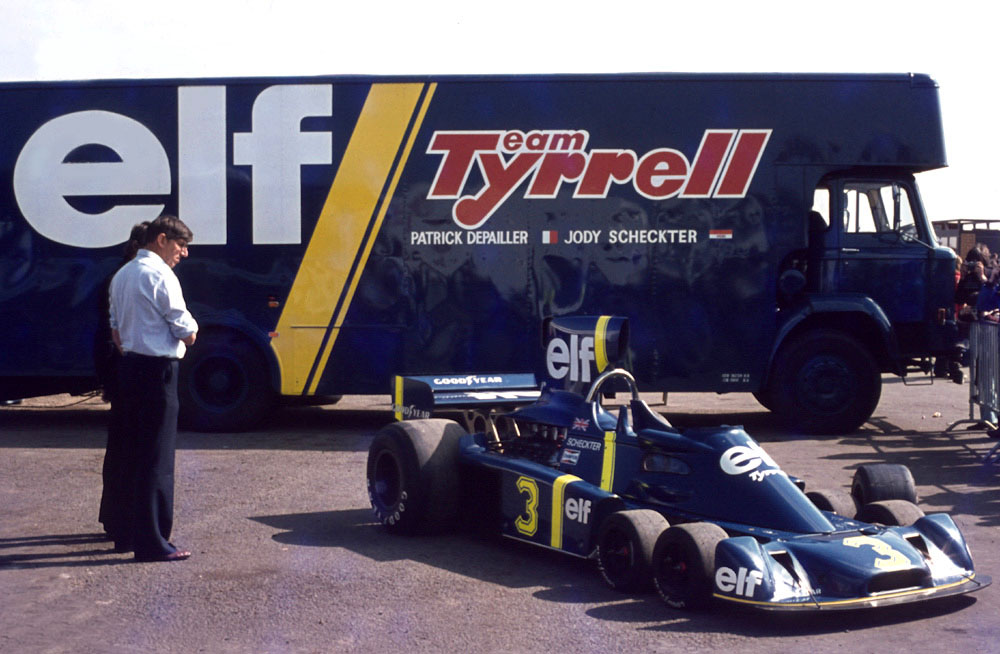
Ken Tyrrell inspecting the P34. Note the airbox on the top, which were banned for the 1976 season onwards.

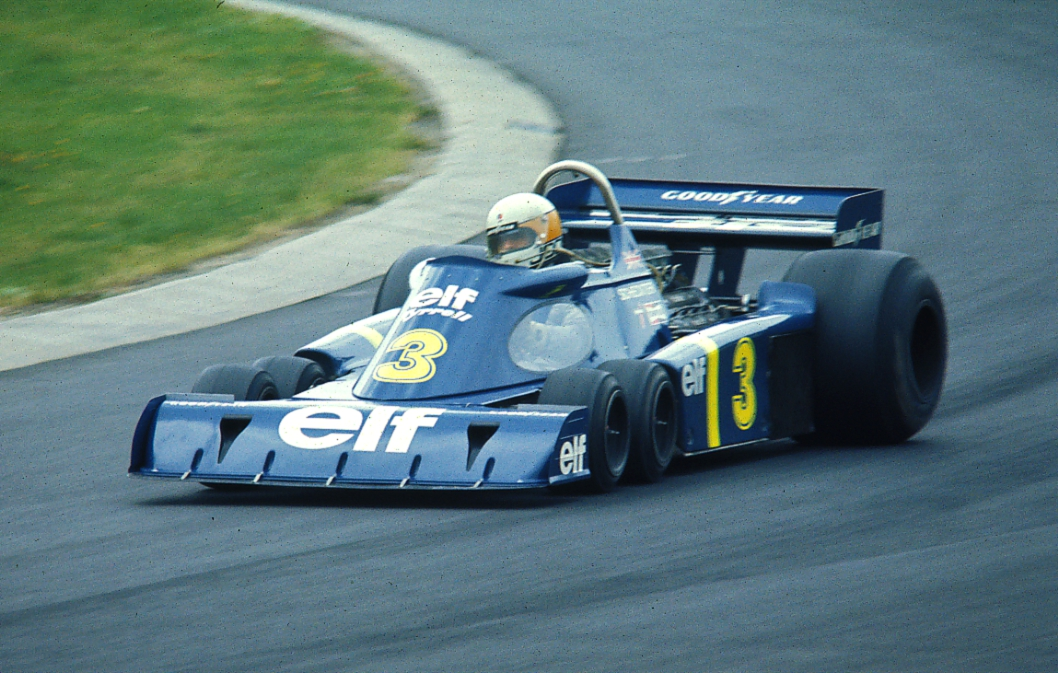
The Tyrrell P34 being driven by Jody Scheckter at the 1976 German Grand Prix

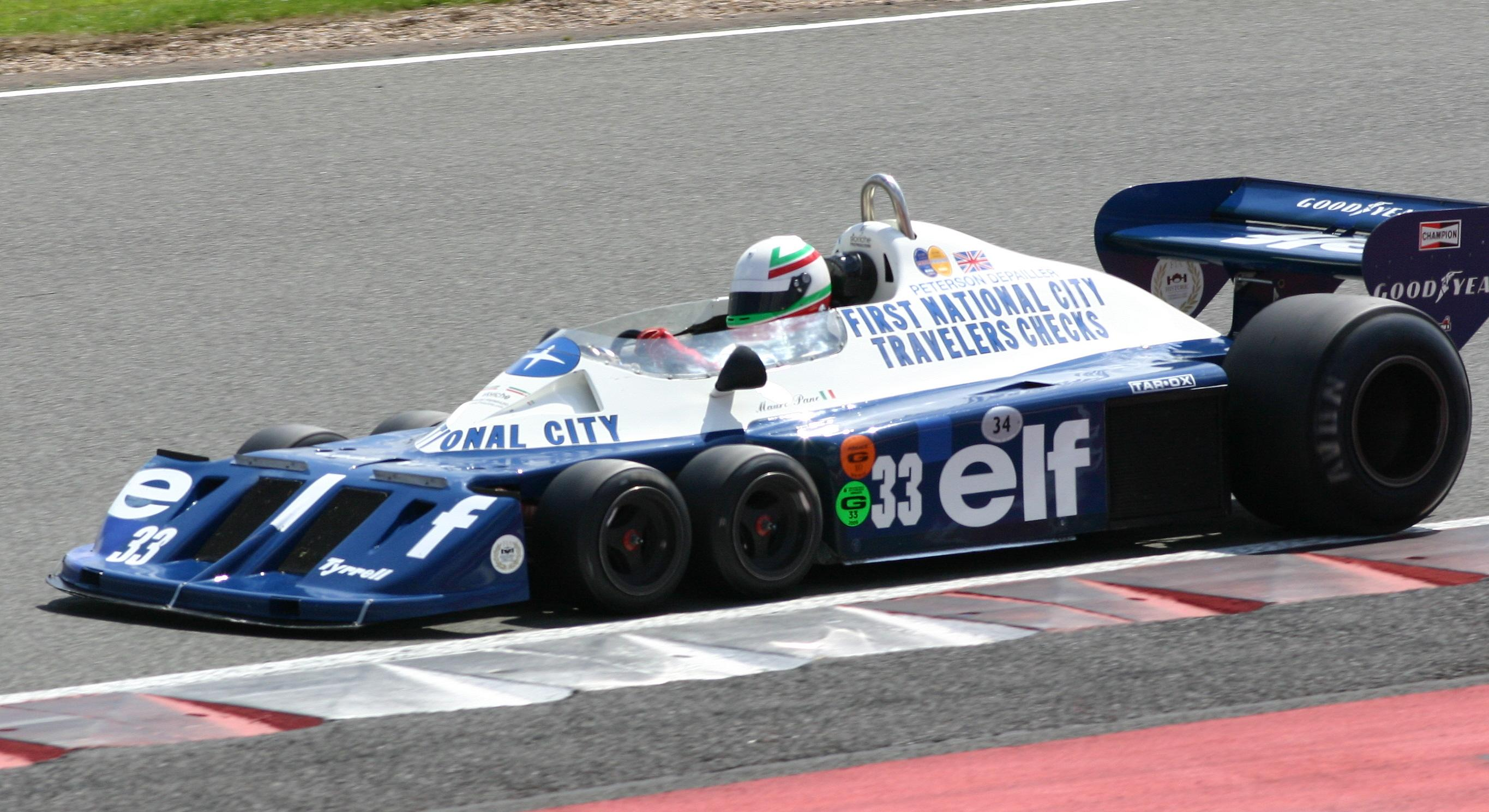
A 1977-spec. Tyrrell P34B at the Silverstone Classic event in 2008

=== 1976 ===
The stretched versions first ran in the Spanish GP in 1976 and proved to be very competitive. Both Jody Scheckter and Patrick Depailler produced good results with the car, but while Depailler praised the car continually, Scheckter was unimpressed. The P34's golden moment came in the Swedish Grand Prix. Scheckter and Depailler finished first and second, and to date Scheckter is the only driver ever to win a race in a six-wheeled car. The car seemed to be particularly good down the straights and through long corners, like at Anderstorp, Watkins Glen, Mosport Park, Fuji and the Österreichring, but it struggled on bumpy circuits like Brands Hatch, Jarama and the Nürburgring, where the grip was actually variable, because, depending upon the contours or bumps on the track, one of the front small tires would touch the road, but the one in front or behind it on the same side would not. Scheckter left the team at the end of the season, insisting that the six-wheeler was "a piece of junk".

=== 1977 ===
For 1977, Scheckter was replaced by Ronnie Peterson, and the P34 was redesigned for cleaner aerodynamics, and some redesign was done on Peterson's car to accommodate his height. The P34B was wider and heavier than before, and, although Peterson was able to string some promising results from the P34B, as was Depailler, it was clear the car was not as good as before. Tyrrell blamed the problems on the increased weight, now 190 pounds (86 kg) over the 1,268 pounds (575 kg) F1 minimum. This placed more strain on the brakes and made it struggle through the corners. Others have blamed Goodyear's failure to properly develop the small front tyres. Late in the season, an attempt to address the handling was made by increasing the track of the front suspension, but this moved the tyres out from their original hidden position, essentially eliminating the whole advantage of the concept.

In November 1977, Tyrrell introduced his car for the 1978 season, and it had a conventional layout. He commented: "In the meantime, we have closed the book on our six-wheeled project, and I am sure the cars will become something of a collector's piece". Tyrrell kept the chassis that Scheckter won on and sold the rest.

== Post-F1 ==
More recently, the P34 has been a popular sight at historic racing events, proving competitive once more. This was made possible when the Avon tyre company agreed to manufacture bespoke 10-inch tyres for Simon Bull, the owner of chassis No. 6. In 1999 and 2000, the resurrected P34 competed at a number of British and European circuits as an entrant in the FIA Thoroughbred Grand Prix series. Driven by Martin Stretton, the car won the TGP series outright in 2000, chassis No. 5 repeating that success in 2008 in the hands of Mauro Pane; this example is now owned by Pierluigi Martini alongside chassis number 2. Stretton also achieved numerous pole positions and class wins at the Grand Prix Historique de Monaco. The P34 has also been seen a number of times at the Goodwood Festival of Speed, held at Goodwood House, West Sussex and the Historic Grand Prix Zandvoort at the Zandvoort circuit.

== Other six-wheeled Formula One cars ==
While the Tyrrell P34 is the most widely known six-wheeled F1 car, it was not the only one. The March Engineering, Williams and Scuderia Ferrari teams also built experimental six-wheeled F1 chassis; however, all of these had four wheels at the back rather than at the front like the P34. The Williams FW07D and FW08B, and the March 2-4-0, had tandem rear wheels, which reduced drag by using the smaller front wheels and tyres in place of the typical larger rear wheels. The Ferrari 312T6 featured the four rear wheels on a single axle. This was similar to how Auto Union increased traction with its Type-D Grand Prix cars in the 1930s. Despite extensive testing, neither the March, Williams, nor the Ferrari, were ever raced. In 1983, the FIA prohibited cars with four driven wheels from competing. Later, the Formula 1 regulations required four as the maximum number of wheels allowed.

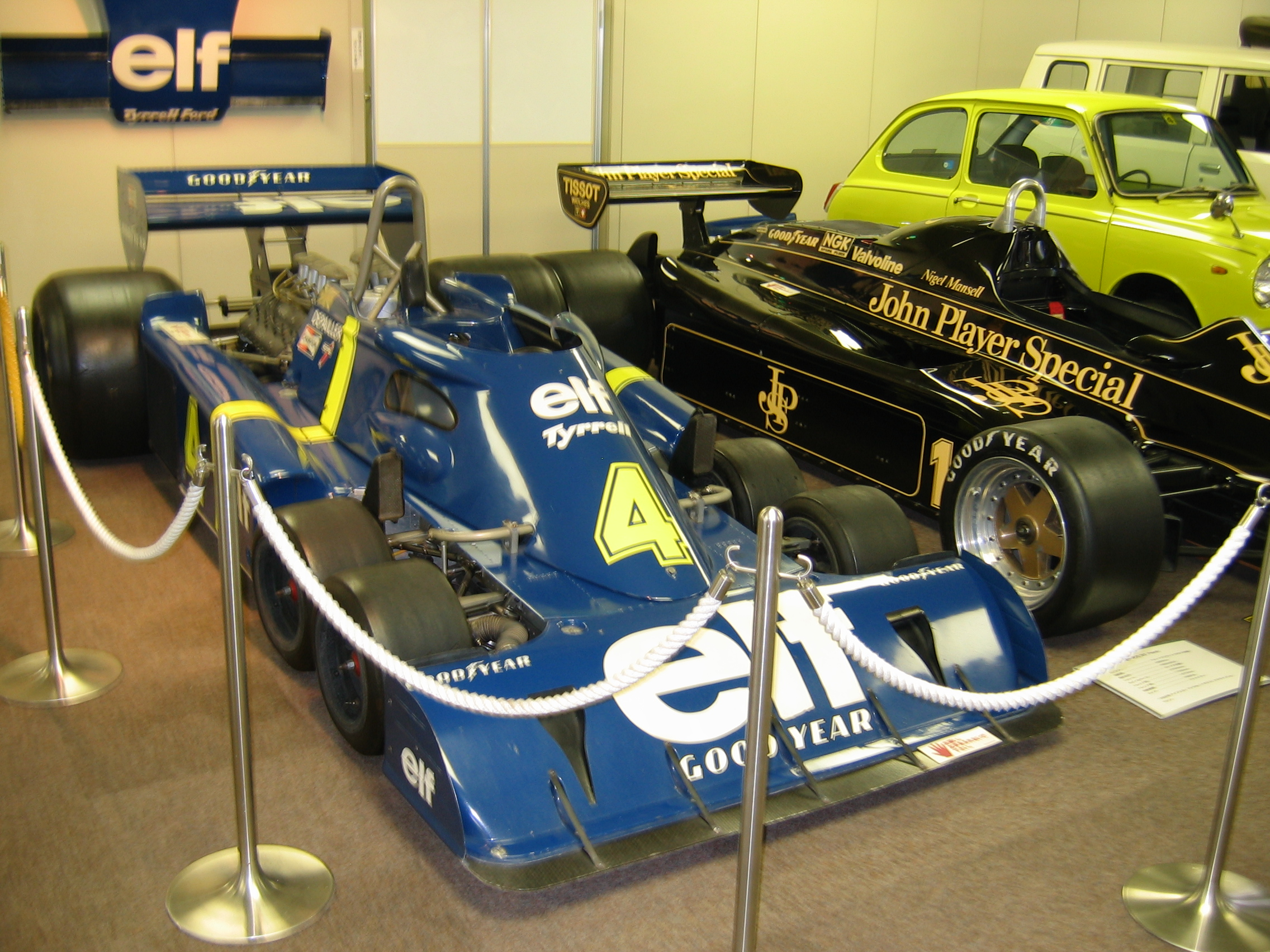
Tyrrell P34 at Tamiya's headquarters

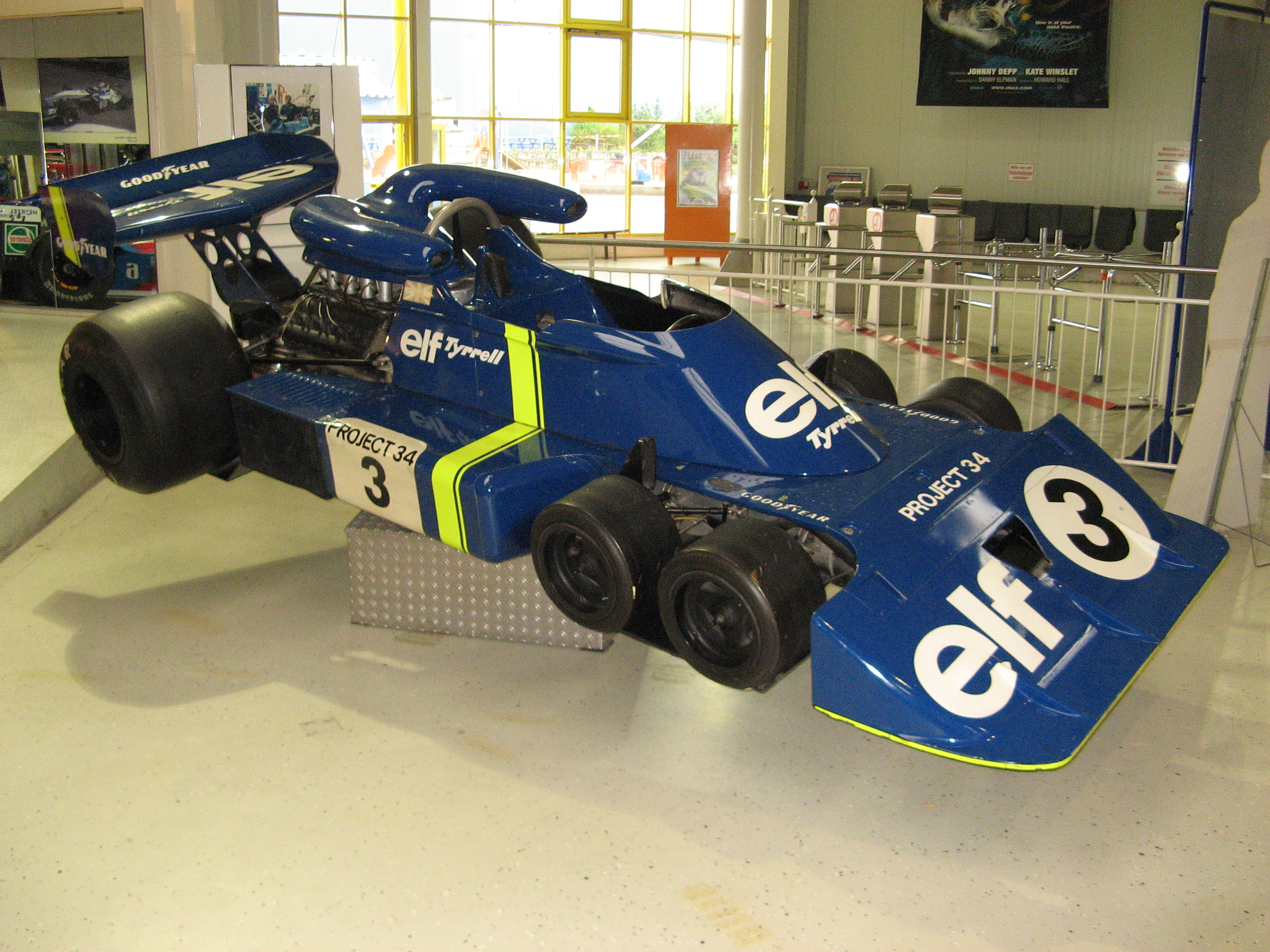
The P34 on display

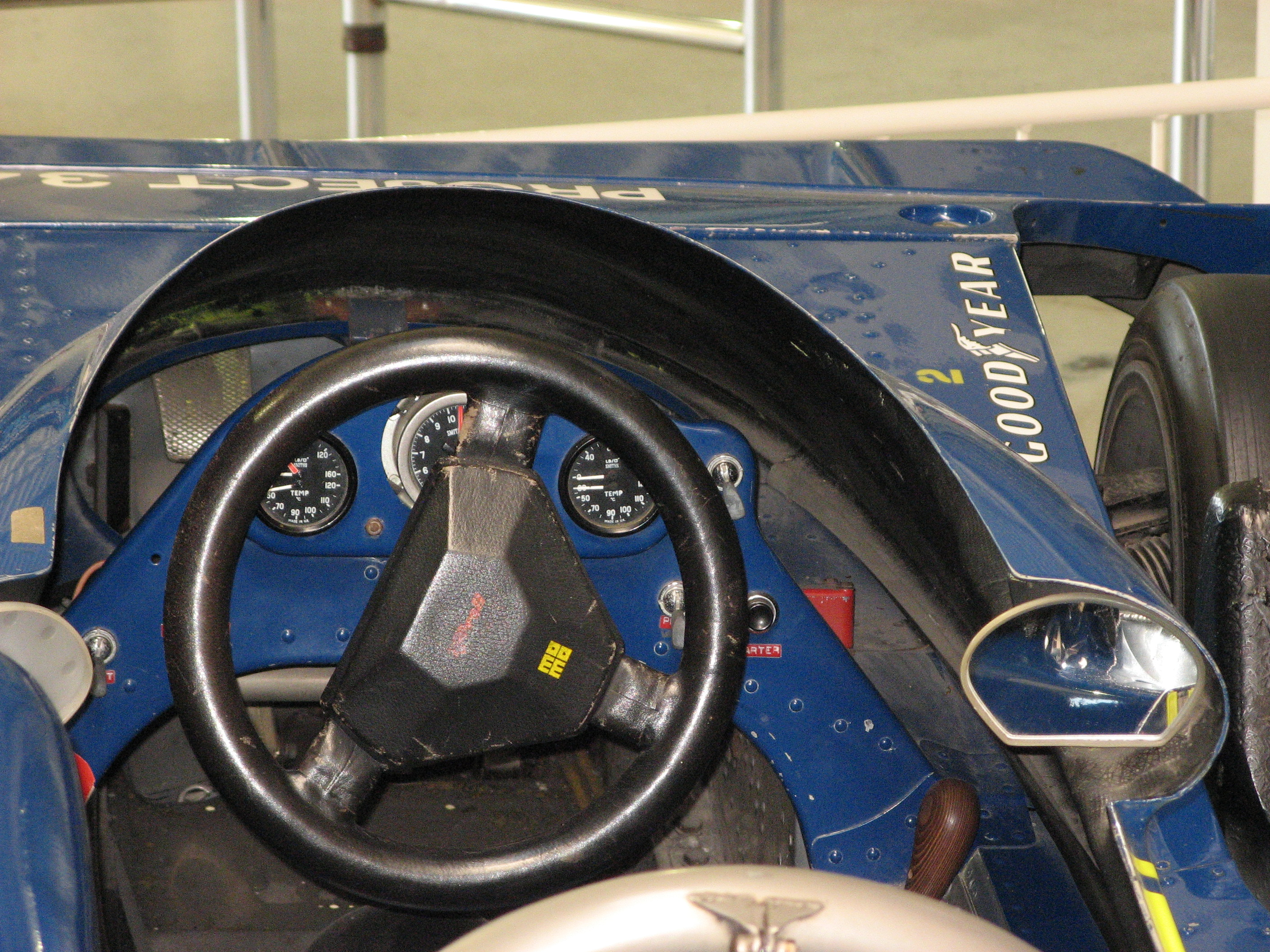
The cockpit of the P34

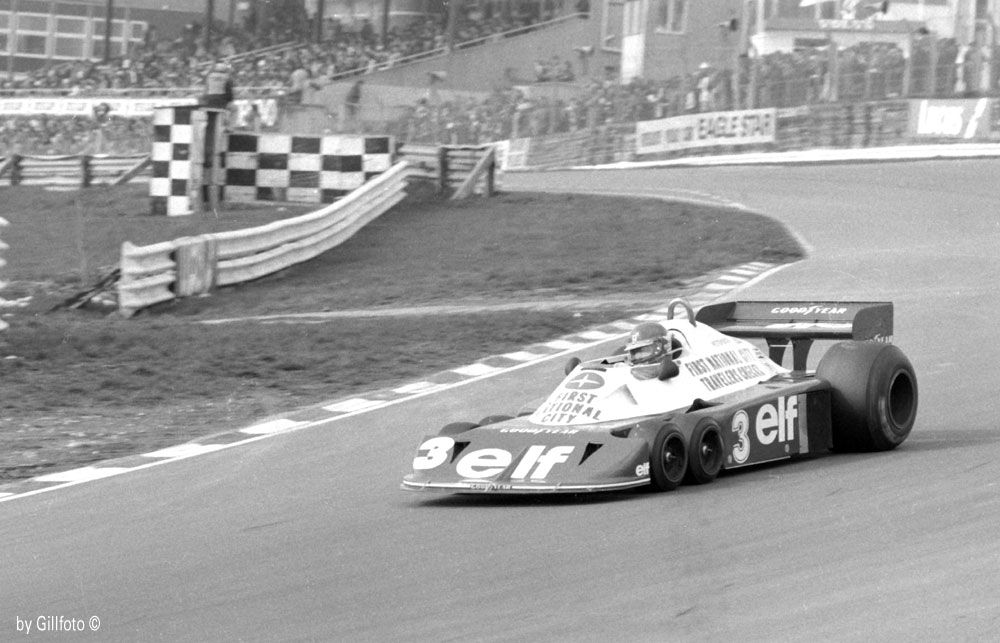
Ronnie Peterson driving the P34 at the 1977 Race of Champions

== Complete Formula One World Championship results ==
(key) (Results in bold indicate pole position; results in italics indicate fastest lap.)

Year	Entrant	Chassis	Engine	Tyres	Drivers	1	2	3	4	5	6	7	8	9	10	11	12	13	14	15	16	17	Points	WCC
1976	Elf Team Tyrrell	P34	Cosworth DFV; V8 NA	G		BRA	RSA	USW	ESP	BEL	MON	SWE	FRA	GBR	GER	AUT	NED	ITA	CAN	USA	JPN		**71***	3rd
1976	Elf Team Tyrrell	P34	Cosworth DFV; V8 NA	G	Jody Scheckter					4	2	**1**	6	2	2	Ret	5	5	4	2	Ret		**71***	3rd
1976	Elf Team Tyrrell	P34	Cosworth DFV; V8 NA	G	Patrick Depailler				Ret	Ret	3	2	2	Ret	Ret	Ret	7	6	2	Ret	2		**71***	3rd
1977	Elf Team Tyrrell	P34B	Cosworth DFV; V8 NA	G		ARG	BRA	RSA	USW	ESP	MON	BEL	SWE	FRA	GBR	GER	AUT	NED	ITA	USA	CAN	JPN	**27**	5th
1977	Elf Team Tyrrell	P34B	Cosworth DFV; V8 NA	G	Ronnie Peterson	Ret	Ret	Ret	Ret	8	Ret	3	Ret	12	Ret	9	5	Ret	6	16	Ret	Ret	**27**	5th
1977	Elf Team Tyrrell	P34B	Cosworth DFV; V8 NA	G	Patrick Depailler	Ret	Ret	3	4	Ret	Ret	8	4	Ret	Ret	Ret	13	Ret	Ret	14	2	3	**27**	5th

* 13 points in 1976 scored using the Tyrrell 007

== In media ==
The Tyrrell P34 was featured in the cartoon The Transformers as the vehicle converted into the Decepticon Stunticon known as Drag Strip. The car, shown sporting a yellow livery with red accents, was depicted as still being active in automotive races, despite the fact that the episode wherein it was stolen was produced and set in the mid-eighties.

The race car also made an appearance in the first episode of the 1993 anime series Moldiver and the 2013 film Rush.

Lupin is seen racing a version of the car in season 1 episode 11 of Lupin the Third Part II, "Bet on the Monaco Grand Prix (Who's Vroomin Who?)".

In season 4 of Phineas and Ferb, a car inspired by the Tyrell P34 is used in the episode "Live and Let Drive" by Dr. Heinz Doofenshmirtz.

In George Harrison's 1976 song "It's What You Value" from his album Thirty Three & 1/3, the lyrics mention "someone's driving a six wheeler," which is widely interpreted as a reference to the Tyrrell P34 Formula One car. This aligns with Harrison's known enthusiasm for motorsports.

== Die-cast toys and model kits ==
Several die-cast and model kit manufacturers were made a replica of the P34:

- 1/64 scale die-cast models were made by Mini GT, Kyosho and Hot Wheels.
- A 1/43 scale model was made by Minichamps.
- 1/20 scale and larger 1/12 scale model kits based on the different specifications were made by Tamiya. A 1/10 scale remote-controlled model car is also available.

== See also ==
Tyrrell-Cosworth P34

- Ferrari 312T6
- March 2-4-0
- Williams FW07D
- Williams FW08B
