= Williams FW09 =

Formula One racing car

Williams FW09 Williams FW09B
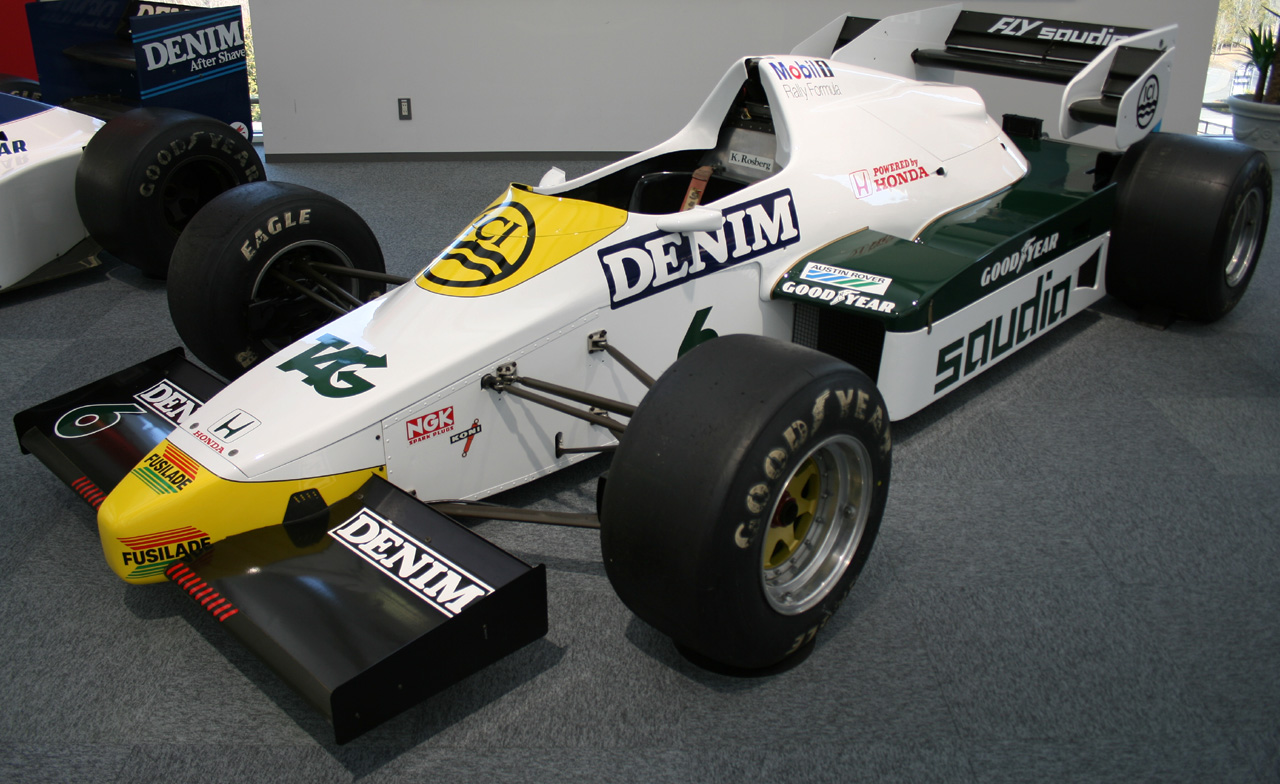
- The FW09B of Keke Rosberg at the Honda Collection Hall
- Category: Formula One
- Constructor: Williams
- Designers: Patrick Head (Technical Director); Neil Oatley (Chief Designer); Frank Dernie (Head of Aerodynamics and R&D); Nobuhiko Kawamoto (Engine Designer (Honda))
- Predecessor: FW08
- Successor: FW10

Technical specifications
- Chassis: Aluminium honeycomb monocoque with carbon fibre stress points
- Suspension (front): Double wishbone, rocker-operated inboard spring damper
- Suspension (rear): Lower wishbone, rocker-operated inboard spring damper/Double wishbone, pullrod-operated inboard spring damper
- Axle track: Front: 1,778 mm (70.0 in); Rear: 1,676 mm (66.0 in)
- Wheelbase: 2,769 mm (109.0 in)
- Engine: Honda RA163E, 1,494 cc (91.2 cu in), 80° V6, turbo, mid-engine, longitudinally mounted
- Transmission: Williams / Hewland 6-speed Manual
- Weight: 558 kg (1,230.2 lb) (FW09); 540 kg (1,190.5 lb) (FW09B)
- Fuel: Mobil
- Tyres: Goodyear

Competition history
- Notable entrants: TAG Williams Racing Team
- Notable drivers: 5. (France) Jacques Laffite; 6. (Finland) Keke Rosberg
- Debut: 1983 South African Grand Prix
- First win: 1984 Dallas Grand Prix
- Last win: 1984 Dallas Grand Prix
- Last event: 1984 Portuguese Grand Prix
| Races | Wins | Poles | F/Laps |
|---|---|---|---|
| 17 | 1 | 0 | 0 |
- Constructors' Championships: 0
- Drivers' Championships: 0

The Williams FW09 was a Formula One car designed by Frank Dernie and Neil Oatley. It was the first Williams chassis to be powered by a turbocharged Honda V6 engine, for which Frank Williams negotiated a deal towards the end of 1982 and the beginning of 1983.

Honda was already supplying the small Spirit team for 1983, but was enthusiastic about supplying Williams, who not only had the reigning World Champion Keke Rosberg as lead driver, but were one of the leading constructors in Formula One who had previously won both the Drivers' and Constructors titles on two occasions, a résumé that neither Spirit nor their young Swedish driver Stefan Johansson could match. Williams had agreed to help develop the engine under Grand Prix race conditions. Spirit folded shortly afterwards.

== Overview ==
=== 1983 ===
The chassis was built from aluminium with carbon fibre used at stress points and was based on the reasonably successful 1983 Williams FW08C. The engine cover had to be redesigned as the car was powered by a smaller, but more powerful (850 bhp (634 kW; 862 PS)) V6 engine rather than the 530 bhp (395 kW; 537 PS) Cosworth V8 that powered the FW08C. The front of the car was also redesigned giving the car cleaner aerodynamics. The FW09 was introduced at the South African Grand Prix, the last race of the 1983 season, which was nothing more than a shakedown exercise. Rosberg showed the potential of both car and engine by qualifying sixth and finishing in fifth place while teammate Jacques Laffite started 10th (after failing to qualify the old car at the previous European Grand Prix at Brands Hatch), but spun off under braking for Crowthorne Corner at the end of the long main straight on lap two, his car ending up in the tyre barrier and out of the race.

=== 1984 ===
The car was then raced in the 1984 season by Rosberg and teammate Laffite. Both drivers found extra power of the engine to their liking, but not the chassis which suffered from the sudden bursts of power that the Honda gave, upsetting the balance of the car- and the engine power delivery was so abrupt that parts of the 1.5L Honda block were actually found to have twisted during the race. Furthermore, the car body was found to produce a lot of drag at high speeds. The problems with the 1984 chassis were noted by broadcaster Clive James, opining in FOCA's season review video that "Rosberg had managed to make the Williams look driveable, which everyone including Frank Williams knew it really wasn't".

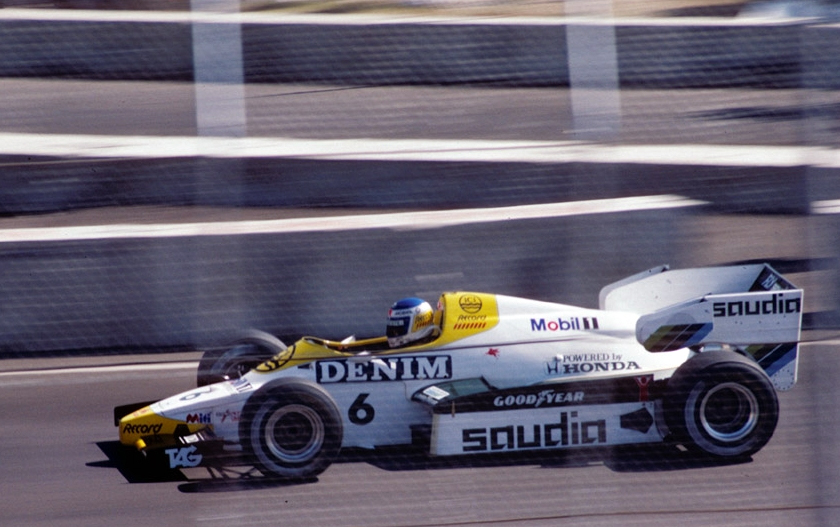
Keke Rosberg won the 1984 Dallas Grand Prix in a Williams FW09B

Reliability was also a problem, with Laffite only recording five finishes during the whole season, but the basic speed was there with the Honda powered FW09 consistently among the fastest cars through the speeds traps on many tracks despite the car itself producing high drag. Indeed, both drivers recorded a top speed of 310 km/h (193 mph) in qualifying and the race at the 1984 South African Grand Prix (although it wasn't as fast as the Brabham-BMWs which recorded 325 km/h (202 mph) in qualifying). Rosberg had a more successful year than Laffite, managing to tame the car's unpredictable handling by winning the attrition-filled Dallas Grand Prix for his and the team's first win since the 1983 Monaco Grand Prix, and giving Honda its first Formula One Grand Prix win since John Surtees won the 1967 Italian Grand Prix at Monza and its first win with a turbo engine.

A modified version of the car dubbed the FW09B was introduced in Round 10 of the season at Brands Hatch for the 1984 British Grand Prix. The car featured 'coke bottle' type sidepods pioneered by McLaren. Unfortunately from that race until the end of the season both Rosberg and Laffite only recorded one finish each and neither was in the points. Rosberg was 8th at the Dutch Grand Prix while Laffite ended the season in Portugal with a disappointing 14th place, following which the FW09 was retired. One particular incident that was more or less a summation of Williams's season was at the Austrian Grand Prix at the Österreichring – which was at the time the fastest circuit used by Formula One with average lap speeds as high as 150+ mph – Rosberg drove into the pits from 9th place and informed technical director Patrick Head that he was retiring the car from the race because it was dangerously unstable at the Österreichring's very fast sweepers and he feared he might have a massive accident – all too commonplace at such a fast circuit. The Finnish driver, who had amazing reflexes and had a flat-out driving style was not one to just quit out of fear, and Head, a hard-nosed character with little patience for losing, accepted Rosberg's decision wholeheartedly. Williams, which along with Ferrari and Brabham were one of the few race winners in a season dominated by McLaren drivers Niki Lauda and Alain Prost, finished sixth in the constructors' championship in 1984 having scored 25.5 points.

The FW09 was retired following the 1984 season. It was replaced in 1985 by the all carbon fibre and more successful Williams FW10.

== Complete Formula One results ==
(key)

| Year | Entrant | Chassis | Engine | Tyres | Driver | Grands Prix | | | | | | | | | | | | | | | | Pts. | WCC |
| Year | Entrant | Chassis | Engine | Tyres | Driver | BRA | USW | FRA | SMR | MON | BEL | DET | CAN | GBR | GER | AUT | NED | ITA | EUR | RSA | | Pts. | WCC |
|---|---|---|---|---|---|---|---|---|---|---|---|---|---|---|---|---|---|---|---|---|---|---|---|
| 1983 | TAG Williams Team | FW09 | Honda RA163E; V6 tc | G | Keke Rosberg | | | | | | | | | | | | | | | 5 | | 2 | 11th |
| 1983 | TAG Williams Team | FW09 | Honda RA163E; V6 tc | G | Jacques Laffite | | | | | | | | | | | | | | | Ret | | 2 | 11th |
| 1984 | | | | | | BRA | RSA | BEL | SMR | FRA | MON | CAN | DET | DAL | GBR | GER | AUT | NED | ITA | EUR | POR | 25.5 | 6th |
| 1984 | Williams Grand Prix Engineering | FW09 | Honda RA163E; V6 tc | G | Keke Rosberg | 2 | Ret | 4 | Ret | 6 | 4 | Ret | Ret | 1 | | | | | | | | 25.5 | 6th |
| 1984 | Williams Grand Prix Engineering | FW09 | Honda RA163E; V6 tc | G | Jacques Laffite | Ret | Ret | Ret | Ret | 8 | 8 | Ret | 5 | 4 | | | | | | | | 25.5 | 6th |
| 1984 | Williams Grand Prix Engineering | FW09B | Honda RA163E; V6 tc | G | Keke Rosberg | | | | | | | | | | Ret | Ret | Ret | 8 | Ret | Ret | Ret | 25.5 | 6th |
| 1984 | Williams Grand Prix Engineering | FW09B | Honda RA163E; V6 tc | G | Jacques Laffite | | | | | | | | | | Ret | Ret | Ret | Ret | Ret | Ret | 14 | 25.5 | 6th |
