= Mauro Pane =

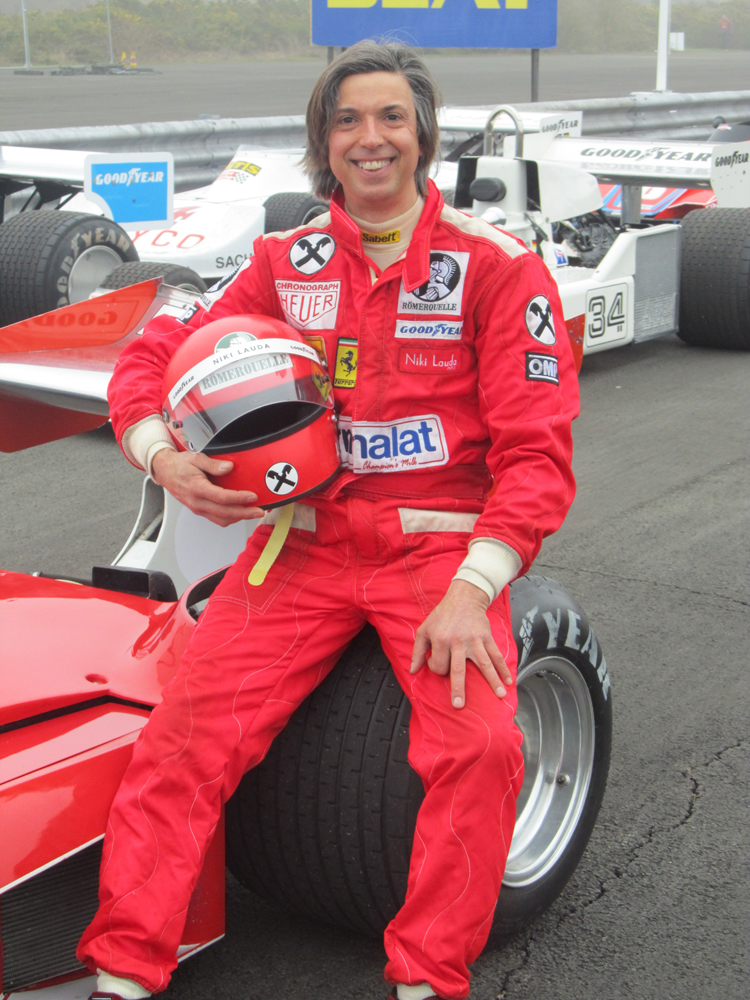
- Pane on the set of the film Rush in March 2012
- Nationality: (Italy) Italian
- Born: March 31, 1963
- Died: February 9, 2014 (aged 50)

Championship titles
- 2008: Historic Formula One Championship

Mauro Pane (31 March 1963 – 9 February 2014) was an Italian driver, champion kart driver and owner of the company "F1 Storiche" (Historic F1)", a European company that repairs and maintains vintage models of single-seater racing cars in Sannazzaro de' Burgondi.

In 1986 Pane won the Italian Karting Championship.

In 2008 Pane was the Historic Formula One Champion with Tyrrell P34 and 2012 with a Lola T370 in Monte Carlo.

Pane was employed in Ron Howard's film Rush as a stunt driver for actor Daniel Brühl who played Niki Lauda

Pane died when his car plunged into a river between Tromello and Gambolò in Lomellina in February 2014. He was 50. The body of a passenger, a Romanian girl named Catalina Ganea, was also found in the car.
