= 2011 Historic Formula One Championship =

2010 Historic Formula One Championship

Seasons
- ← none 2012 →

The 2011 Historic Formula One Championship (also known as Thoroughbred Grand Prix) was the seventeenth season of the Historic Formula One Championship. It began at Hockenheim on April 17 and ended at Jarama on October 30.

It was won by John Delane from The United States driving a Tyrrell 002 despite not winning any of the ten races.

== Calendar ==
Round	Circuit	Dates	Race winner	Car
1	(Germany) Hockenheim	17 April	(United Kingdom) Bobby Verdon-Roe	McLaren-Cosworth MP4/1B
2	(Austria) A1-Ring	14 May	(United Kingdom) Bobby Verdon-Roe	McLaren-Cosworth MP4/1B
3	(Austria) A1-Ring	15 May	(United Kingdom) Bobby Verdon-Roe	McLaren-Cosworth MP4/1B
4	(Italy) Monza	5 June	(France) Patrick d’Aubreby	Tyrrell-Cosworth 012
5	(United Kingdom) Brands Hatch	3 July	(Japan) Hideki Yamauchi	March-Cosworth 761
6	(Germany) Nürburgring	11 September	(United Kingdom) Rob Austin	Surtees-Cosworth TS16
7	(Portugal) Algarve	22 October	(Japan) Hideki Yamauchi	March-Cosworth 761
8	(Portugal) Algarve	23 October	(United Kingdom) Nathan Kinch	McLaren-Cosworth MP4/1B
9	(Spain) Jarama	29 October	(United Kingdom) Bobby Verdon-Roe	McLaren-Cosworth MP4/1B
10	(Spain) Jarama	30 October	(United Kingdom) Bobby Verdon-Roe	McLaren-Cosworth MP4/1B

== Drivers ==
No	Driver	Chassis/Engine
1	(United States) John Delane	Tyrrell-Cosworth 002
2	(United Kingdom) Bobby Verdon-Roe	McLaren-Cosworth MP4/1B
4	(Australia) Brendon Cook	Tyrrell-Cosworth 012
6	(United Kingdom) Richard Eyre	Williams-Cosworth FW8
7	(Spain) Joaquin Folch	Brabham-Cosworth BT49
10	(Japan) Katsu Kubota	March-Cosworth 761
18	(Japan) Hideki Yamauchi	March-Cosworth 761
19	(United Kingdom) Rob Austin	Surtees-Cosworth TS16
20	(Germany) Peter Wuensch	Wolf-Cosworth WR1
27	(United Kingdom) Tony Smith	Williams-Cosworth FW6
28	(United Kingdom) Nathan Kinch	McLaren-Cosworth MP4/1B
30	(United Kingdom) David Abbott	Arrows-Cosworth A4
32	(United Kingdom) Terry Sayers	Osella-Cosworth FW1
36	(Italy) Luciano Quaggia	Theodore-Cosworth TR 1-2
69	(United Kingdom) Roland Kinch	Arrows-Cosworth A4
