= RAM 01 =

Formula One car

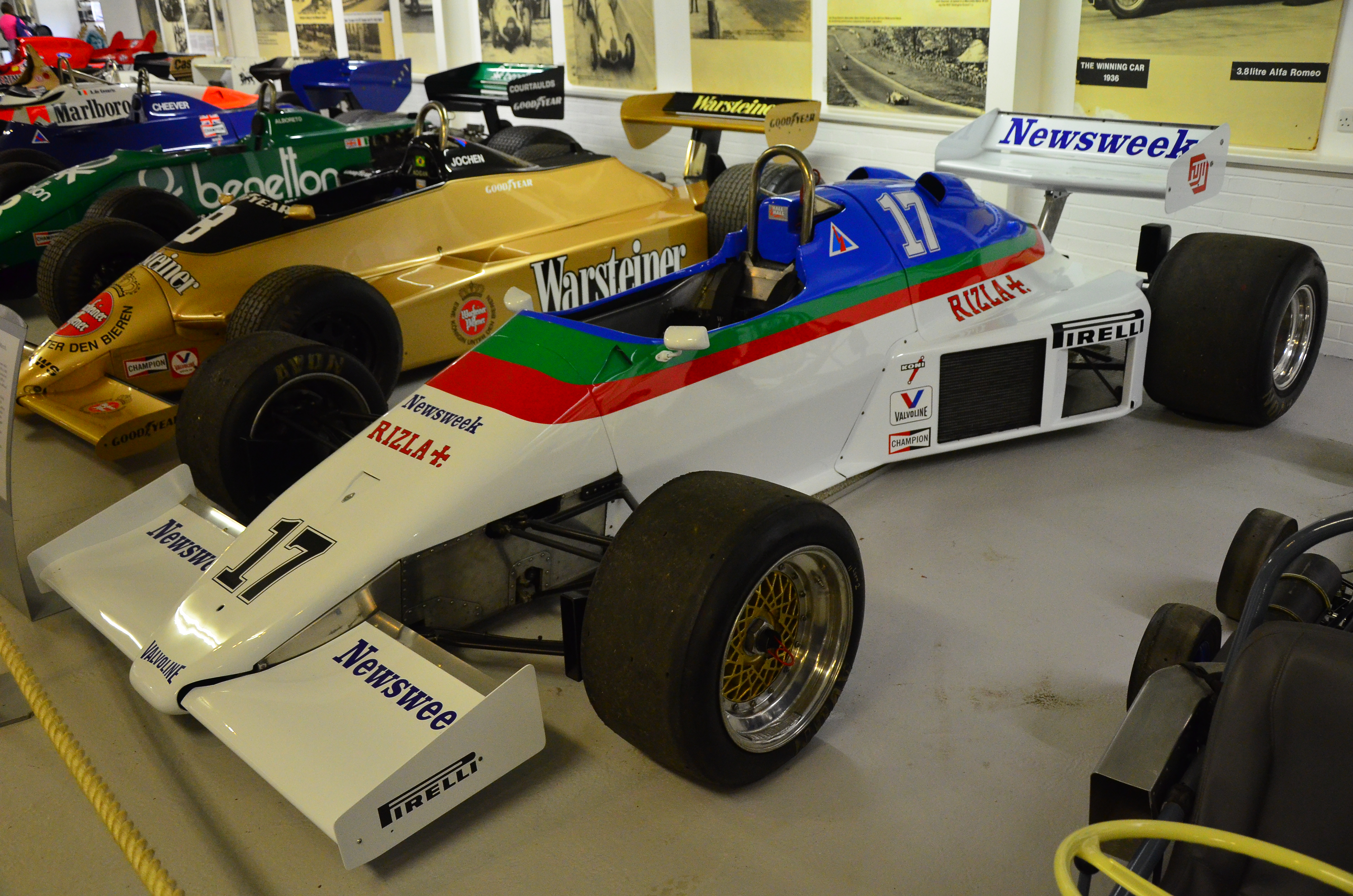
- Category: Formula One
- Constructor: RAM Racing
- Designer: Dave Kelly

Technical specifications
- Chassis: Aluminium Honeycomb monocoque
- Suspension (front): Double wishbones, pull-rod-actuated coil springs and dampers, anti-roll bar
- Suspension (rear): Double wishbones, pull-rod-actuated coil springs and dampers, anti-roll bar
- Wheelbase: 2,692 mm (106.0 in)
- Engine: Ford-Cosworth DFY 2,993 cc (182.6 cu in) 90° V8 naturally aspirated mid-mounted
- Transmission: Hewland FGA 400 5-speed manual.
- Power: 530 hp (400 kW)
- Weight: 540 kg (1,190 lb)
- Tyres: Pirelli

Competition history
- Notable drivers: Eliseo Salazar; Jean-Louis Schlesser; Jacques Villeneuve, Sr. Kenny Acheson; Jonathan Palmer
- Debut: 1983 Brazilian Grand Prix
Races	Wins	Poles	F/Laps
17	0	0	0

The RAM 01, also known as the RAM March 01, is an open-wheel Formula One race car built by British team and constructor RAM Racing in 1983.

== Design and development ==
The 01 was the first car built by the British team to participate in the 1983 Formula One world championship.

Designed by Dave Kelly, the car was equipped with a 530-hp Ford Cosworth DFY V8 powertrain with 390 N⋅m (290 lb⋅ft) of torque, which drove the rear wheels through a five-speed Hewland FGA manual gearbox. The chassis frame, an evolution of that of the March 821, was of the aluminum monocoque type, while the braking system was composed of four ventilated disc brakes. The suspension consisted of double wishbones and shock absorbers with coil springs.

== Racing history ==
With constant driver changes Eliseo Salazar, Jean-Louis Schlesser, Jacques Villeneuve, Sr., and Kenny Acheson, the team only managed to qualify twice, in the first and last races of the season.

The 01 was also used for the first two races of the 1984 season, fitted with a Hart 1.5 litre turbocharged engine.

The 01 was later used in the FIA Historic F1 Championship, winning the 1997 title with Bob Berridge.

== Complete Formula One World Championship results ==
(key)

Year	Entrant	Engine	Tyres	Drivers	1	2	3	4	5	6	7	8	9	10	11	12	13	14	15	16	Pts.	WCC
1983	RAM Racing Team March	Ford Cosworth DFY 3.0 V8	P		BRA	USW	FRA	SMR	MON	BEL	DET	CAN	GBR	GER	AUT	NED	ITA	EUR	RSA		0	NC
1983	RAM Racing Team March	Ford Cosworth DFY 3.0 V8	P	Eliseo Salazar	15	Ret	DNQ	DNQ	DNQ	DNQ											0	NC
1983	RAM Racing Team March	Ford Cosworth DFY 3.0 V8	P	Jean-Louis Schlesser			DNQ														0	NC
1983	RAM Racing Team March	Ford Cosworth DFY 3.0 V8	P	Jacques Villeneuve, Sr.								DNQ									0	NC
1983	RAM Racing Team March	Ford Cosworth DFY 3.0 V8	P	Kenny Acheson									DNQ	DNQ	DNQ	DNQ	DNQ	DNQ	12		0	NC
1984	Skol Bandit Formula 1 Team	Hart 415T 1.5 S4 tc	P		BRA	RSA	BEL	SMR	FRA	MON	CAN	DET	DAL	GBR	GER	AUT	NED	ITA	EUR	POR	0	NC
1984	Skol Bandit Formula 1 Team	Hart 415T 1.5 S4 tc	P	Jonathan Palmer	8	Ret															0	NC
