= Williams FW08 =

1982-83 Williams Formula One racing car

Williams FW08 Williams FW08B Williams FW08C
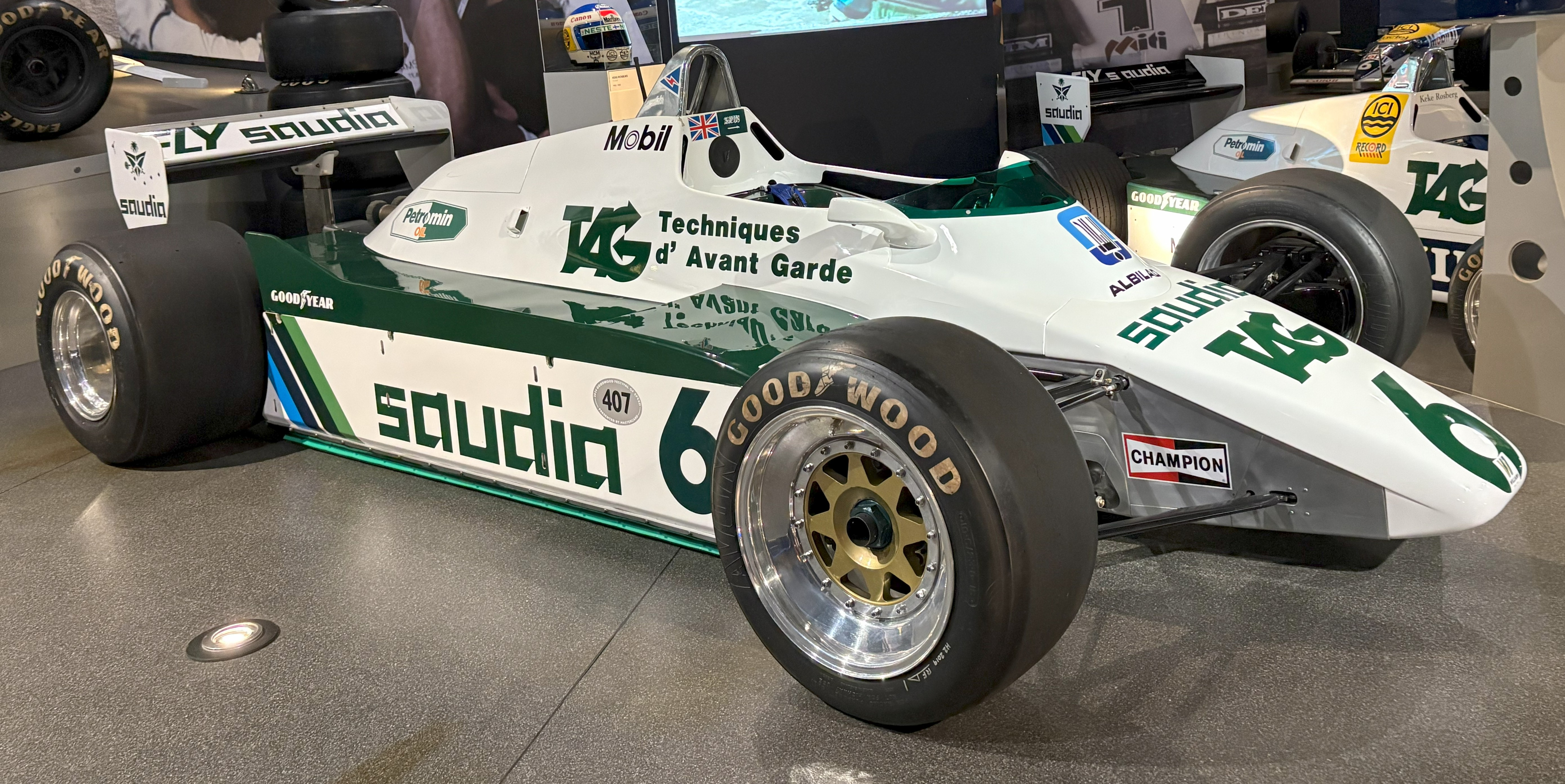
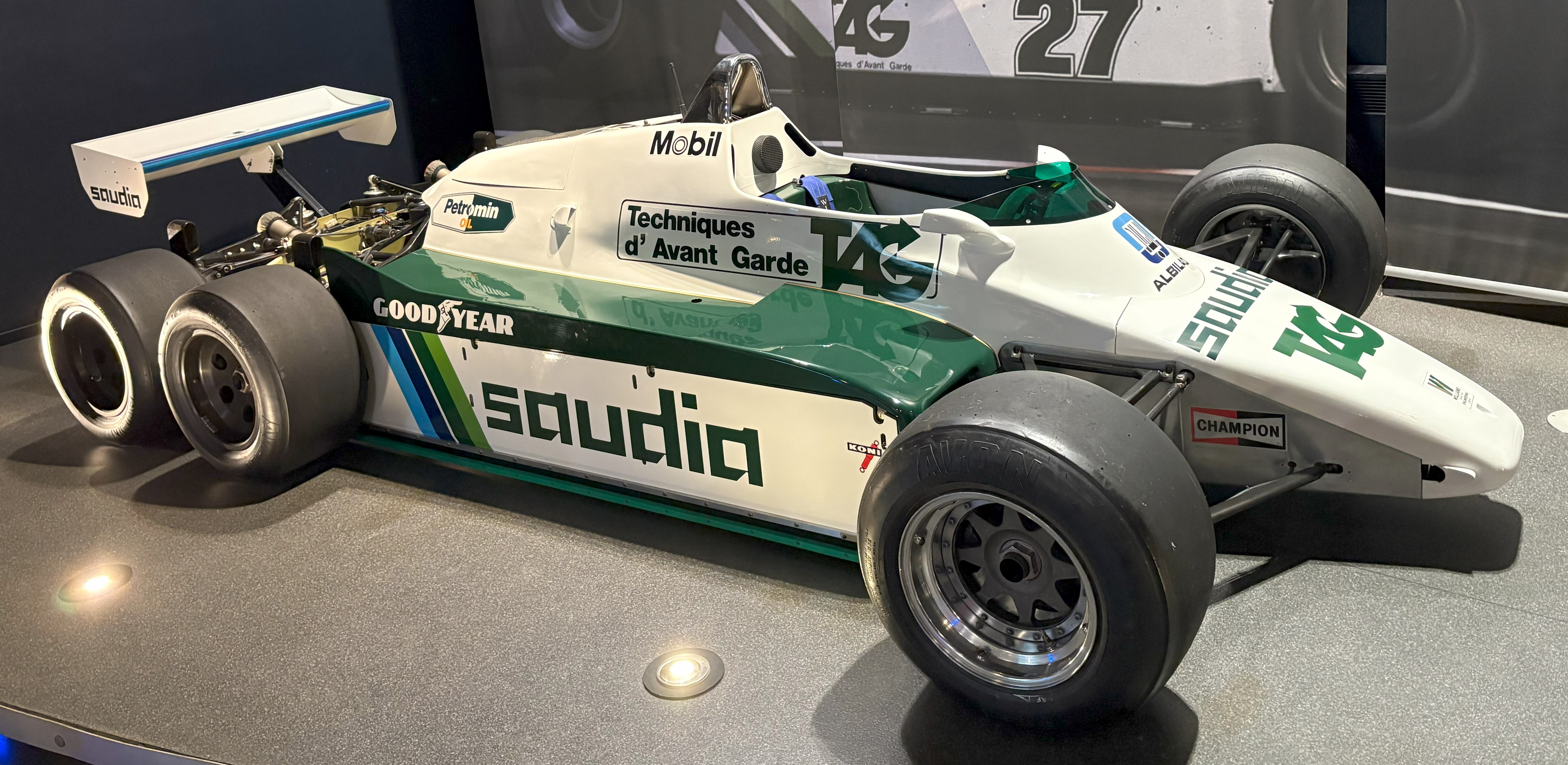
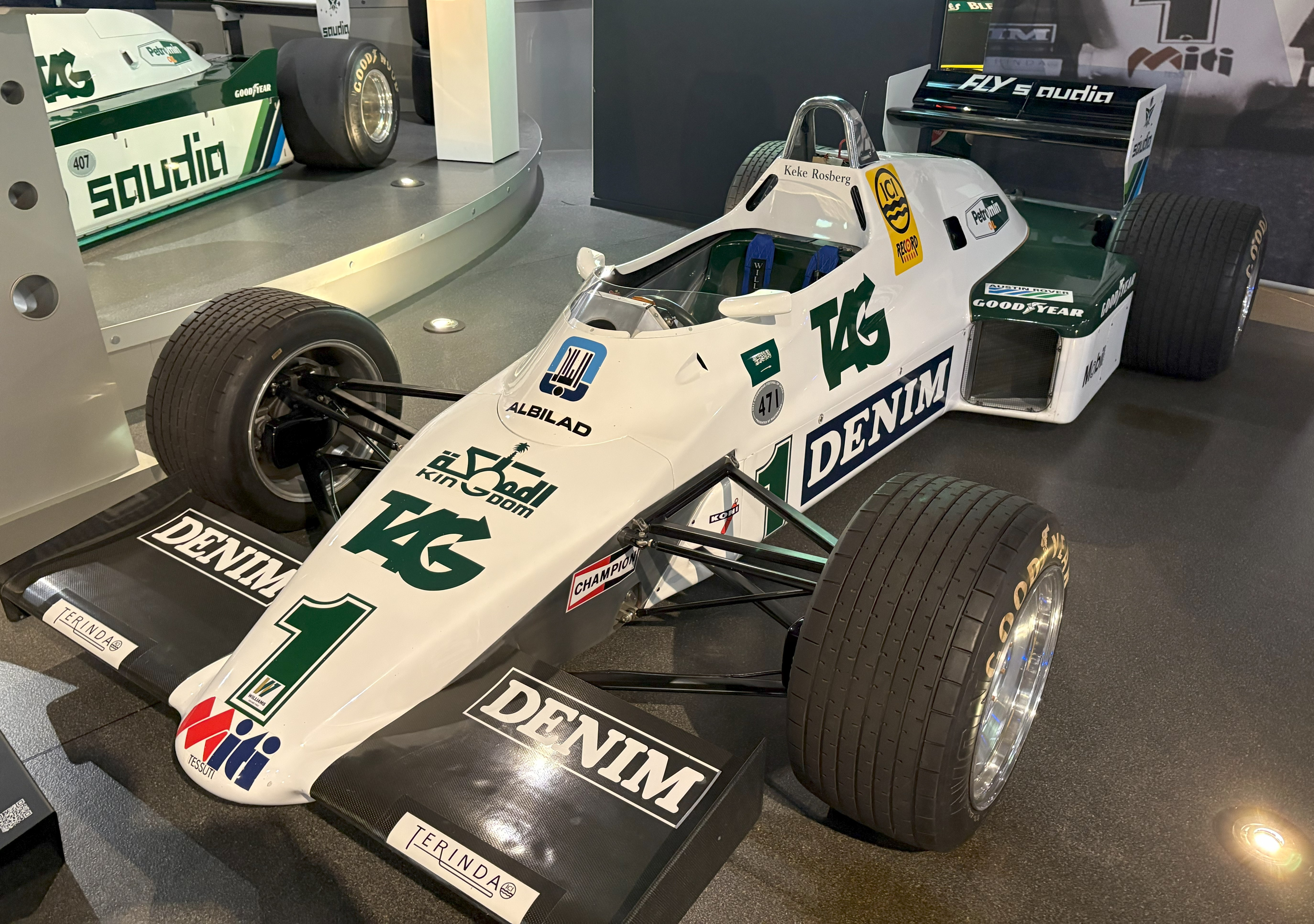
- Keke Rosberg's Williams FW08 (1982). Unraced Williams FW08B. Keke Rosberg's Williams FW08C (1983).
- Category: Formula One
- Constructor: Williams
- Designers: Patrick Head (Technical Director); Frank Dernie (Head of Aerodynamics and R&D)
- Predecessor: FW07
- Successor: FW09

Technical specifications
- Chassis: Aluminium honeycomb monocoque
- Suspension (front): Double wishbones, coil springs over dampers, anti-roll bar
- Suspension (rear): Double wishbones, coil springs over dampers, anti-roll bar
- Engine: Ford Cosworth DFV, 2,993 cc (182.6 cu in), 90° V8, NA, mid-engine, longitudinally mounted
- Transmission: Hewland FGA 400 5-speed manual
- Fuel: Mobil
- Tyres: Goodyear

Competition history
- Notable entrants: TAG Williams Racing Team
- Notable drivers: 5. (Republic of Ireland) Derek Daly; 6./1. (Finland) Keke Rosberg; 2. (France) Jacques Laffite; 42. (United Kingdom) Jonathan Palmer
- Debut: 1982 Belgian Grand Prix
- First win: 1982 Swiss Grand Prix
- Last win: 1983 Monaco Grand Prix
- Last event: 1983 European Grand Prix
Races	Wins	Poles	F/Laps
27	2	2	0
- Constructors' Championships: 0
- Drivers' Championships: 1 (1982 – Keke Rosberg)

The Williams FW08 was a Formula One car designed by Frank Dernie, which debuted at the 1982 Belgian Grand Prix held at the Zolder circuit. An evolution of the FW07 that it replaced, the car was used by Finnish driver Keke Rosberg to win the 1982 World Drivers' Championship.

== Overview ==
The FW08 was a development of the Williams FW07 but featured a shorter wheelbase and much stiffer chassis to cope with the higher g-loading that the minimum ride height regulations introduced in 1981 demanded. While McLaren and others pioneered the use of carbon fibre chassis, Patrick Head stuck to aluminium honeycomb for the new car. The FW08 suited Keke Rosberg's aggressive driving style and he used it to good effect, winning the 1982 Swiss Grand Prix and scoring several other podium places to snatch the championship. Rosberg was on course to win in Belgium on the car's debut but tyre trouble caused him to drop back in the closing stages of the race. The FW08 was Frank Dernie's favourite car of all those he worked on during his time with the team.

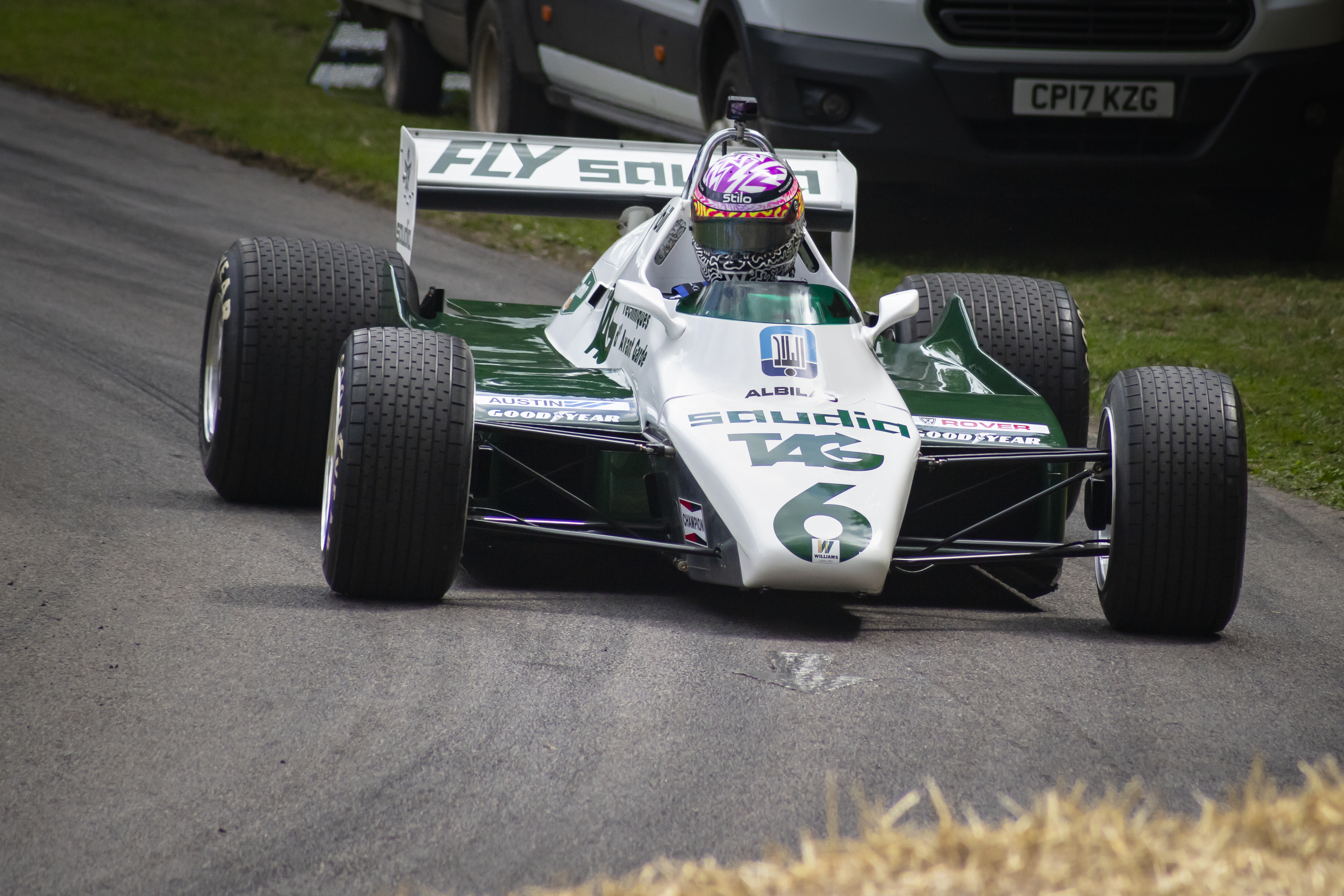
Lia Block driving the original FW08 at the Goodwood Festival of Speed in 2024

During wind tunnel testing at Imperial College, Frank Dernie recorded that the FW08 had a lift to drag ratio of a remarkable 8:1 - eight parts downforce to just one part drag, giving the FW08 supreme aerodynamic efficiency and giving Keke Rosberg a chance to compete with the far more powerful turbo Renault and Ferrari during the 1982 season (the turbo runners of 1982 were producing at least 570 BHP at over 11,000 RPM in race trim, compared to the 515 BHP of the best Cosworth runners). During 1982 Keke Rosberg often qualified and raced without front wings as the downforce generated by the underbody Venturi tunnels was so huge that a front wing was not required. Removing the front wing meant better penetration through the air, thus giving the FW08 straightline speed which was regularly the best of a Cosworth DFV equipped runner and allowing Rosberg the opportunity of taking on the far more powerful turbos thanks to a combination of his driving skill and the lower weight of the FW08 compared to the heavy bulky turbo runners of 1982.

The FW08B was a six-wheeled (four driven wheels at the rear and two undriven wheels at the front) variant that originated from the FW07D (also six-wheeled). It never raced. Patrick Head specifically said that the reason it was banned was because "someone in a FOCA meeting said it would drive up costs and cause chaos during pitstops". The FIA promptly limited the number of wheels for all cars to four, of which only two may be driven.

The FW08 was updated for the 1983 Formula One season to become the FW08C. Under new regulations all ground effect was out and flat bottom cars were in, meaning nearly all the cars in Formula One had to be heavily modified or replaced and the FW08 was no different. Against the turbo cars of Renault, Brabham and Ferrari, Williams were not expected to do as well as they did. Jacques Laffite rejoined the team, having started his F1 career with Frank Williams Racing Cars back in 1974. Rosberg opened the season with pole position at the Brazilian Grand Prix (the last for a Ford-Cosworth DFV powered car) and scored the car's last win, at the 1983 Monaco Grand Prix. He eventually finished fifth in the Drivers' Championship, while Williams finished the season in fourth place, the best of the Cosworth-powered cars.

The FW08C also has the distinction of being the first Formula One car ever driven by Ayrton Senna, at Donington Park in July 1983, after he badgered team boss Frank Williams for a test after being sat beside him on a flight. Senna completed 40 laps and lapped the circuit faster than anyone else had managed in the car, including 1983 race drivers Rosberg and Laffite. However, Williams was not able to offer Senna a drive for 1984 as Rosberg and Laffite were under contract and the Brazilian signed for Toleman instead. Senna did not drive another Williams until he signed to drive for the team in his final season, 1994.

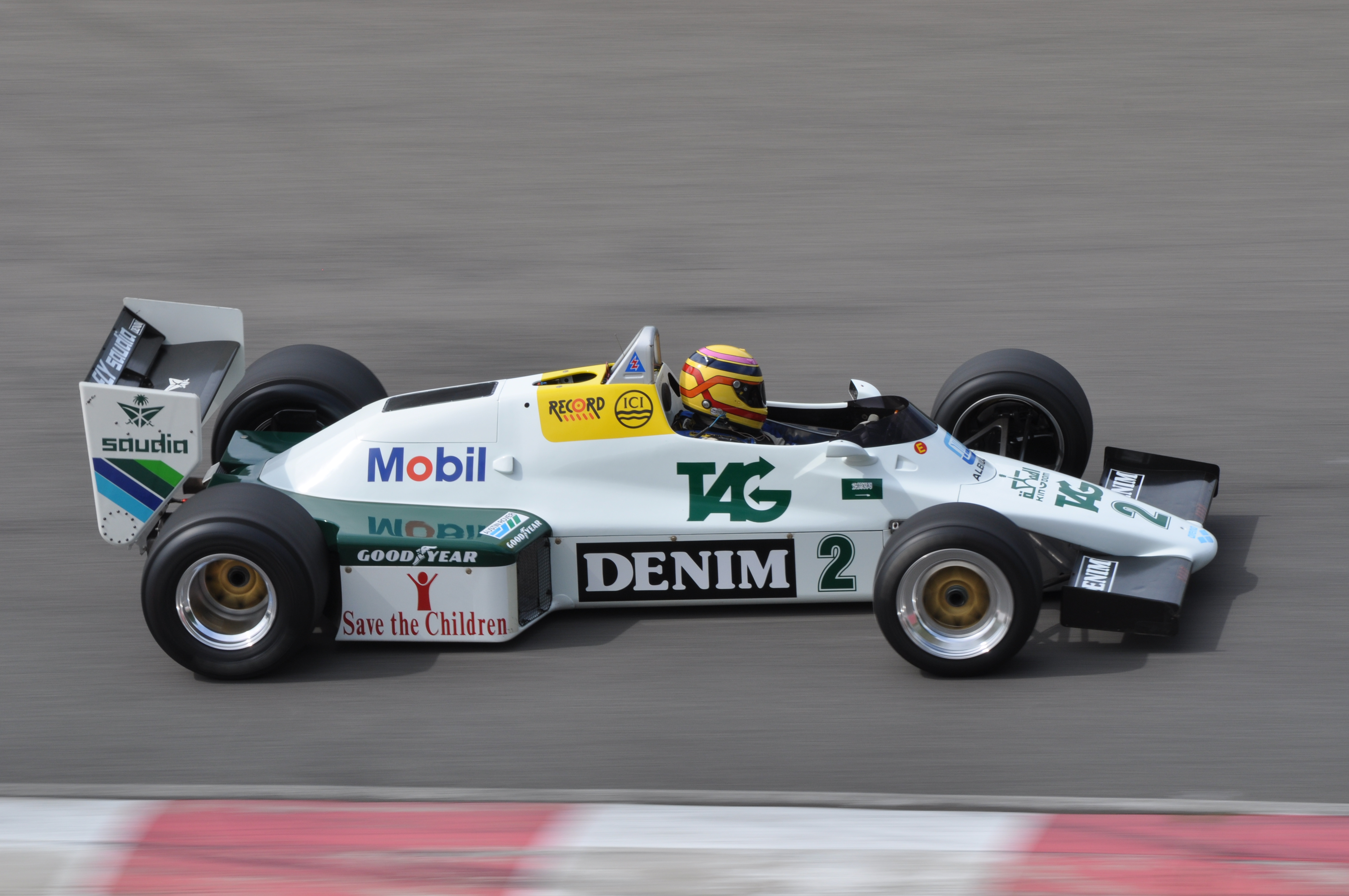
A Williams FW08C formerly of Jacques Laffite, pictured in 2010. The sidepods are much reduced in comparison to the earlier FW08.

The FW08C was retired after the 1983 European Grand Prix at Brands Hatch. A third car was actually raced by the team at this race and was driven to 13th place by Jonathan Palmer. It was replaced by the Honda-powered FW09 for the last race of the season in South Africa.

Early in 1983, Rosberg drove his FW08C to victory in the Race of Champions at Brands Hatch. To date this is the last non-championship Formula One race to have been held.

In 1985, two FW08Cs were entered by PMC Motorsport in some races of the Formula 3000 championship, driven by Thierry Tassin and Lamberto Leoni. The results achieved were unremarkable apart from Lamberto Leoni's two third place finishes, in the Pau street race and at the Österreichring.

== Complete Formula One results ==
(key) (results in bold indicate pole position)

Year	Entrant	Chassis	Engine	Tyres	Driver	1	2	3	4	5	6	7	8	9	10	11	12	13	14	15	16	Pts.	WCC
1982	TAG Williams Racing Team	FW08	Cosworth DFV; V8 NA	G		RSA	BRA	USW	SMR	BEL	MON	DET	CAN	NED	GBR	FRA	GER	AUT	SUI	ITA	CPL	58*	4th
1982	TAG Williams Racing Team	FW08	Cosworth DFV; V8 NA	G	Keke Rosberg					2	Ret	4	Ret	3	**Ret**	5	3	2	1	8	5	58*	4th
1982	TAG Williams Racing Team	FW08	Cosworth DFV; V8 NA	G	Derek Daly					Ret	6	5	7	5	5	7	Ret	Ret	9	Ret	6	58*	4th
1983	TAG Williams Racing Team	FW08C	Cosworth DFV; V8 NA	G		BRA	USW	FRA	SMR	MON	BEL	DET	CAN	GBR	GER	AUT	NED	ITA	EUR	RSA		38*	4th
1983	TAG Williams Racing Team	FW08C	Cosworth DFV; V8 NA	G	Keke Rosberg	**DSQ**	Ret	5	4	1	5	2	4	11	10	8	Ret	11	Ret			38*	4th
1983	TAG Williams Racing Team	FW08C	Cosworth DFV; V8 NA	G	Jacques Laffite	4	4	6	7	Ret	6	5	Ret	12	6	Ret	Ret	DNQ	DNQ			38*	4th
1983	TAG Williams Racing Team	FW08C	Cosworth DFV; V8 NA	G	Jonathan Palmer														13			38*	4th

* 14 points in 1982 scored using the FW07C
* 2 points in 1983 scored by Honda turbo powered Williams FW09

== Sources ==
- Hamilton, Maurice, ed. (1982). Autocourse 1982–1983. Hazleton Publishing. ISBN 0-905138-32-5.
- Hamilton, Maurice, ed. (1983). Autocourse 1983–1984. Hazleton Publishing. ISBN 0-905138-32-5.
