= Lotus 94T =

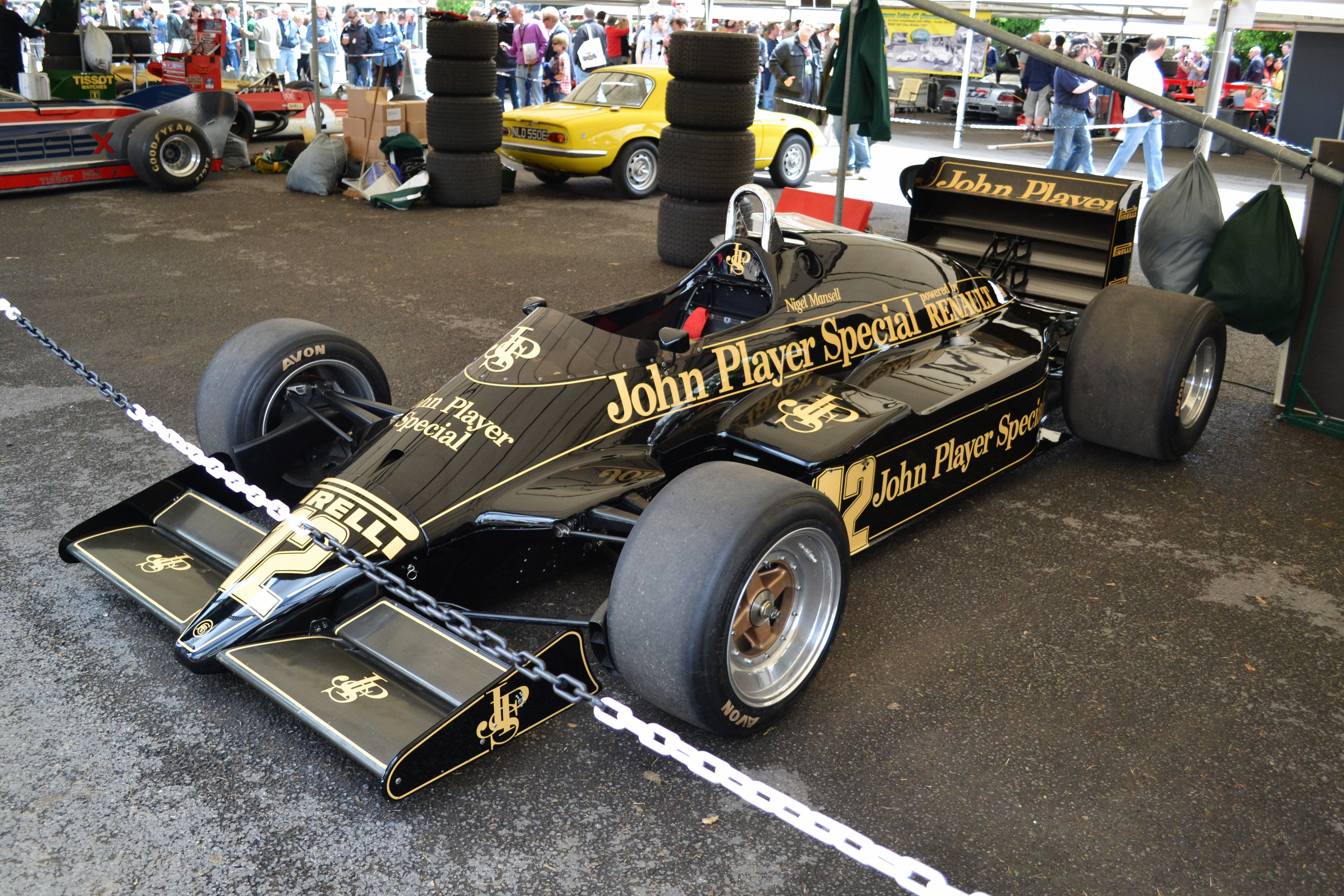
- 94T of Nigel Mansell at the 2012 Goodwood Festival of Speed
- Category: Formula One
- Constructor: Lotus
- Designers: Gérard Ducarouge (Technical Director); Martin Ogilvie (Chief Designer); John Davis (Head of Aerodynamics and R&D)
- Predecessor: 93T
- Successor: 95T

Technical specifications
- Chassis: Carbon fibre and Kevlar monocoque
- Suspension (front): Double-wishbones, pull rod, coil springs
- Suspension (rear): Double-wishbones, pull rod, coil springs
- Axle track: Front: 1,816 mm (71 in); Rear: 1,664 mm (66 in)
- Wheelbase: 2,654 mm (104 in)
- Engine: Renault Gordini EF1, 1,492 cc (91.0 cu in), 90° V6, turbo, mid-engine, longitudinally-mounted
- Transmission: Lotus / Hewland 5-speed manual
- Power: 650 hp (484.7 kW) @ 12,000 rpm
- Weight: 545 kg (1,202 lb)
- Fuel: Elf
- Tyres: Pirelli

Competition history
- Notable entrants: John Player Team Lotus
- Notable drivers: 11. (Italy) Elio de Angelis; 12. (United Kingdom) Nigel Mansell
- Debut: 1983 British Grand Prix
Races	Wins	Podiums	Poles	F/Laps
7	0	1	1	1
- Constructors' Championships: 0
- Drivers' Championships: 0

The Lotus 94T was a Formula One racing car used by Team Lotus in the second part of the 1983 Formula One season.

== Design and development ==
The car was designed and built in only five weeks by the incumbent designer Gérard Ducarouge, who was brought into the team by boss Peter Warr in an attempt to stave off the uncompetitiveness of the previous Lotus cars.

The car was powered by the Renault Gordini EF1 V6-turbo engine, and ran on Pirelli tyres. It featured a lower, slimmer monocoque with improved weight distribution over its predecessor.

== Racing history ==
The 94T made its debut at the 1983 British Grand Prix and proved to be competitive in the hands of Nigel Mansell, who came home fourth in the race, and Elio de Angelis, and provided an upswing in form for the Lotus team which would carry them into the 1984 season with a developed version of the car. Its best result was a third-place at the 1983 European Grand Prix with Mansell, who also claimed the fastest lap in the race, while de Angelis won the pole position. De Angelis scored two points with the car, but Mansell made it into the top six on several occasions, and finished the season with 12 points to his credit.

== Gallery ==
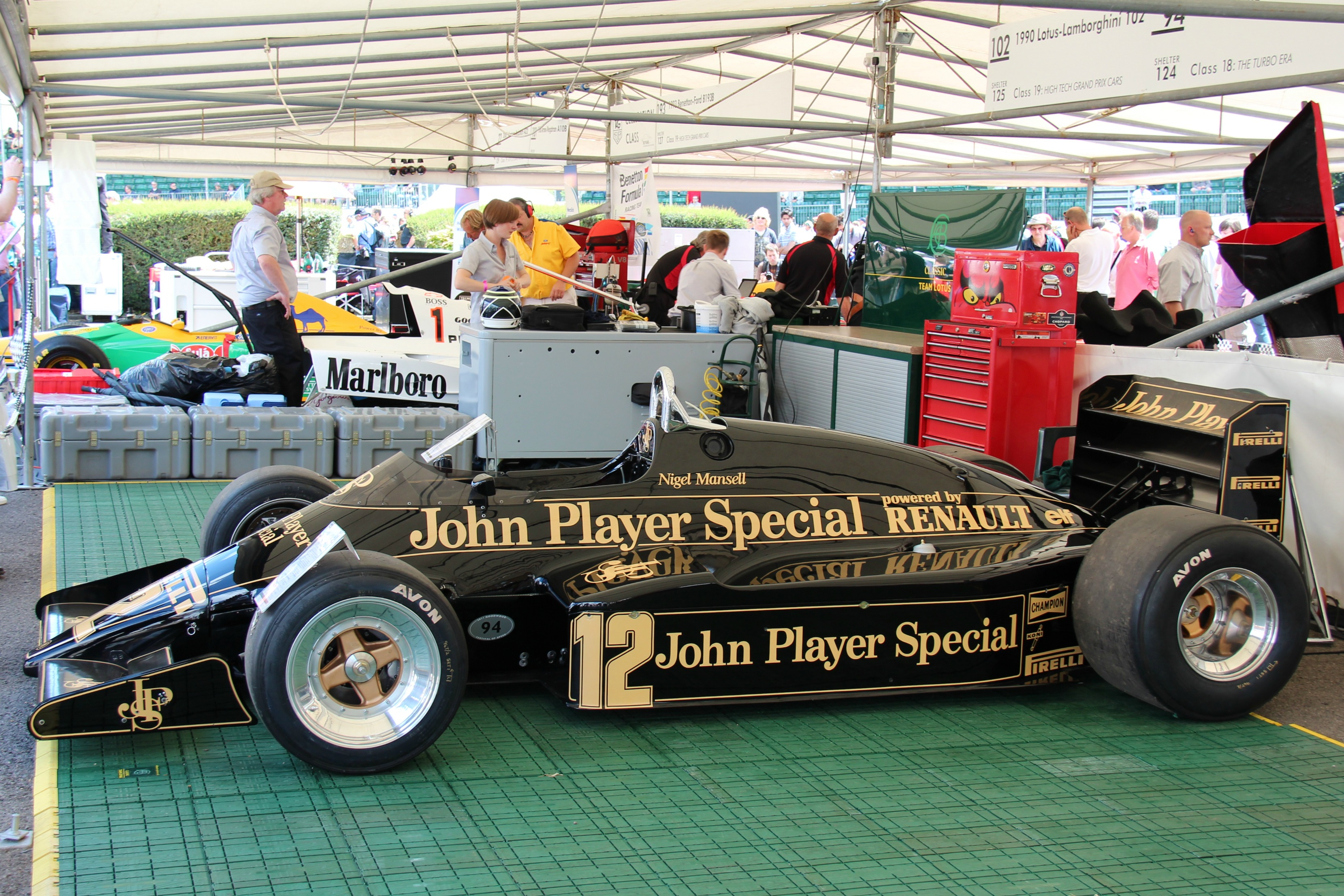
A Lotus 94T of Nigel Mansell at the 2011 Goodwood Festival of Speed

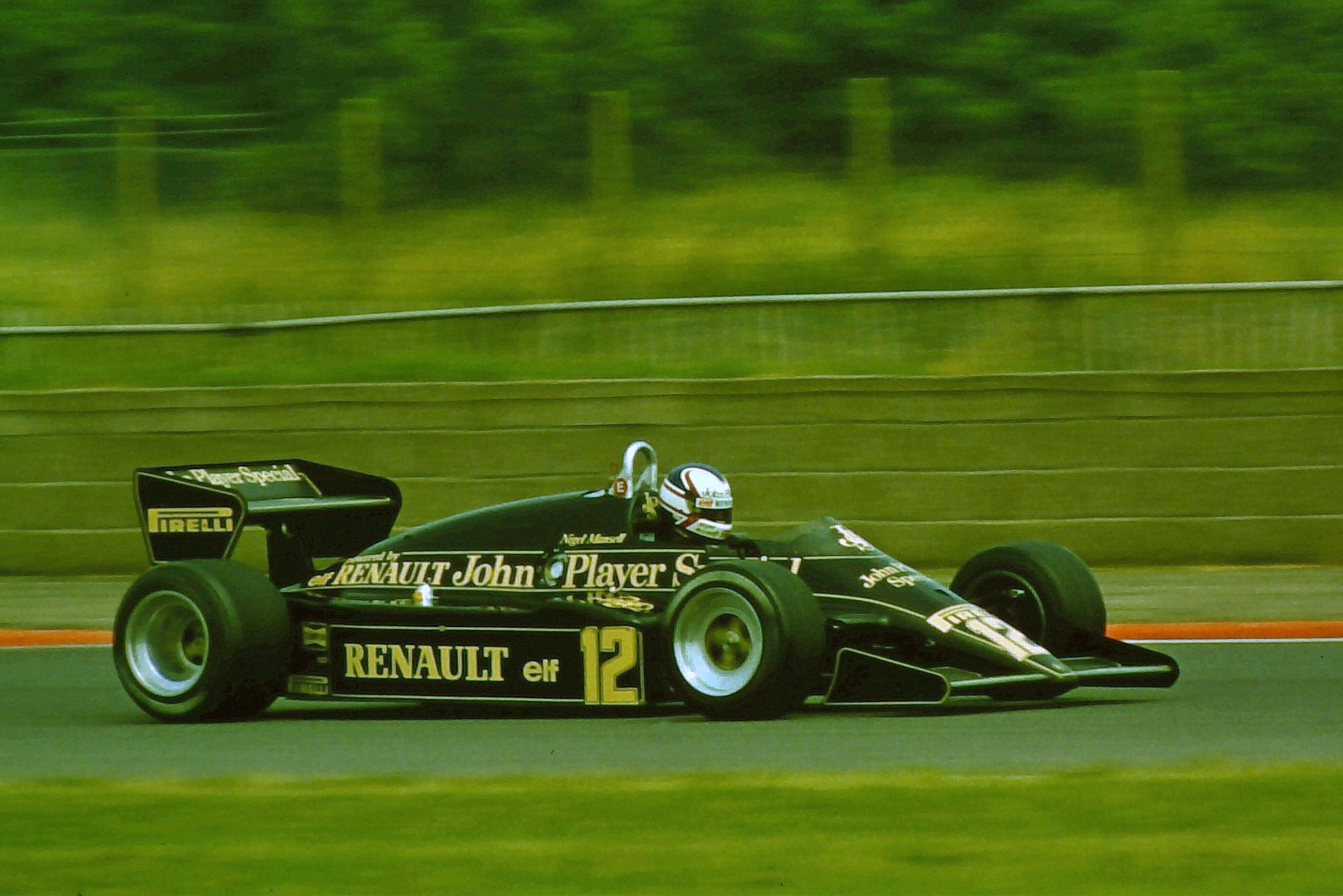
Mansell in his 94T at the 1983 British Grand Prix

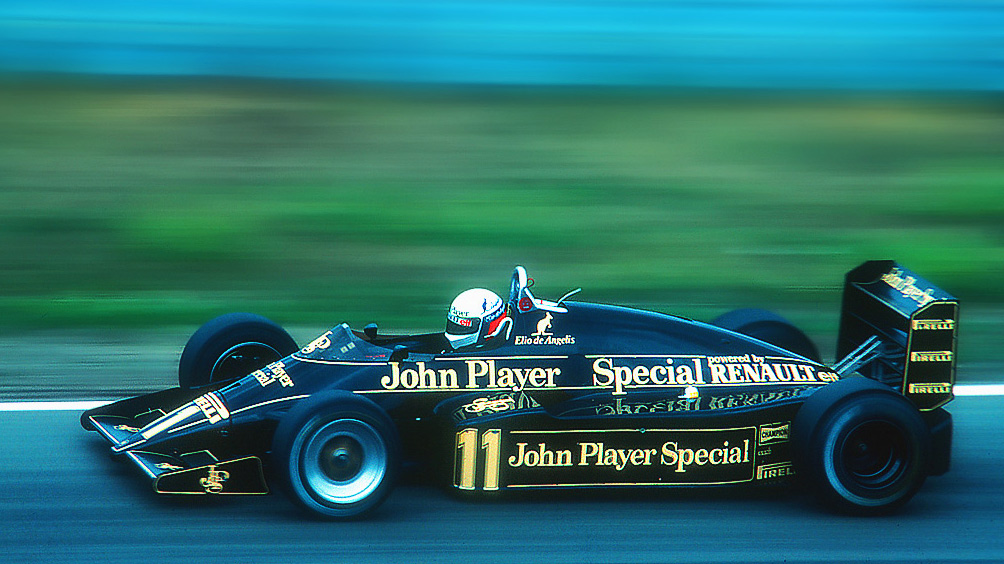
Elio de Angelis driving the 94T at the 1983 Dutch Grand Prix

== Complete Formula One results ==
(key) (results in bold indicate pole position; results in italics indicate fastest lap)

Year	Entrant	Engine	Tyres	Drivers	1	2	3	4	5	6	7	8	9	10	11	12	13	14	15	Points	WCC
1983	John Player Team Lotus	Renault Gordini EF1; V6 tc	**P**		BRA	USW	FRA	SMR	MON	BEL	DET	CAN	GBR	GER	AUT	NED	ITA	EUR	RSA	**11***	**8th**
1983	John Player Team Lotus	Renault Gordini EF1; V6 tc	**P**	Elio de Angelis									Ret	Ret	Ret	Ret	5	**Ret**	Ret	**11***	**8th**
1983	John Player Team Lotus	Renault Gordini EF1; V6 tc	**P**	Nigel Mansell									4		5	Ret	8	3	Ret	**11***	**8th**

* Lotus also used the 92 and 93T models in 1983 but scored all Lotus-Renault points with the 94T; for the German Grand Prix Mansell used the 94T in practice but used the 93T in the race. He also scored a point in the Detroit Grand Prix with the 92, but since the car used a different engine from the one the 94T used, the point counted towards Lotus-Ford in the Constructors’ Championship.
