= Lotus 93T =

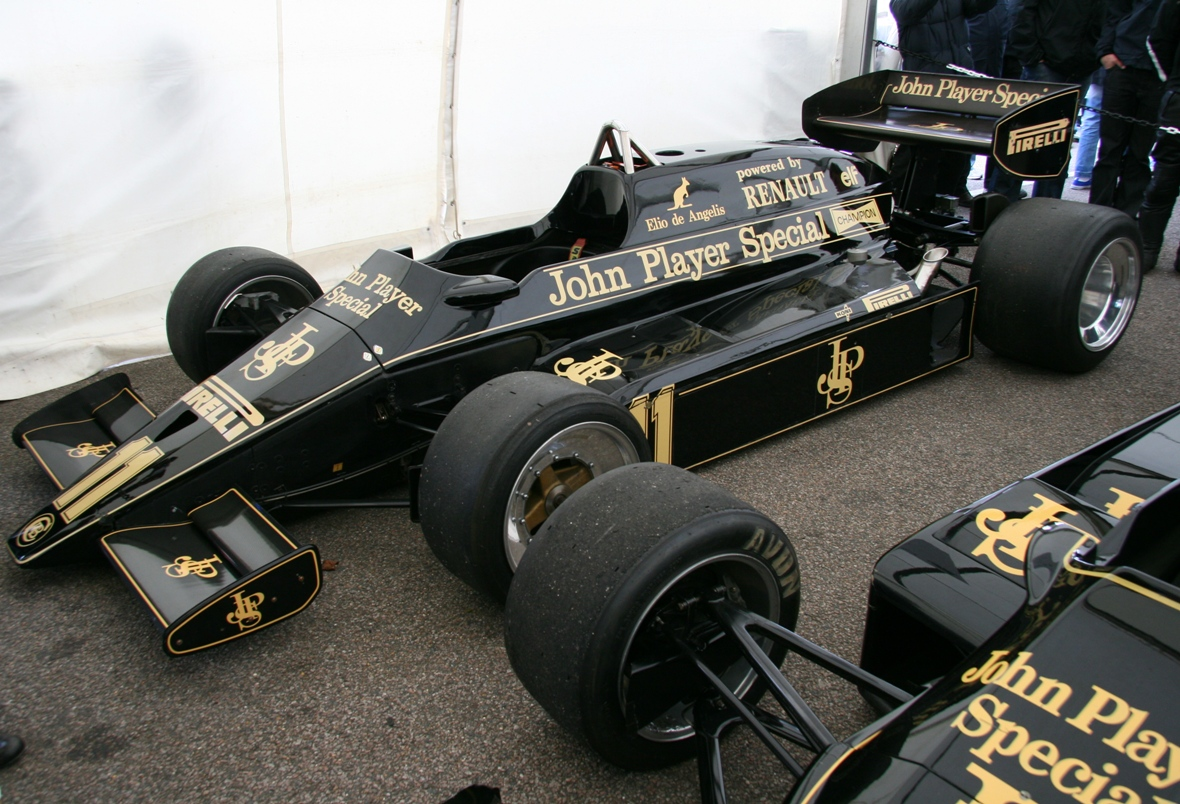
- An Elio de Angelis Lotus 93T on display in 2010.
- Category: Formula One
- Constructor: Lotus
- Designers: Colin Chapman (Technical Director); Martin Ogilvie (Chief Designer); John Davis (Head of Aerodynamics and R&D)
- Predecessor: 92
- Successor: 94T

Technical specifications
- Chassis: Carbon fibre and Kevlar monocoque
- Suspension (front): Double wishbones, pull rod, coil springs
- Suspension (rear): Double wishbones, pull rod, coil springs
- Axle track: Front: 1,816 mm (71 in); Rear: 1,664 mm (66 in)
- Wheelbase: 2,667 mm (105 in)
- Engine: Renault Gordini EF1, 1,492 cc (91.0 cu in), 90° V6, turbo, mid-engine, longitudinally mounted
- Transmission: Lotus / Hewland 5-speed manual
- Weight: 560 kg (1,230 lb)
- Fuel: Elf
- Tyres: Pirelli

Competition history
- Notable entrants: John Player Team Lotus
- Notable drivers: 11. (Italy) Elio de Angelis; 12. (United Kingdom) Nigel Mansell
- Debut: 1983 United States Grand Prix West
Races	Wins	Podiums	Poles	F/Laps
7	0	0	0	0
- Constructors' Championships: 0
- Drivers' Championships: 0

The Lotus 93T was a Formula One car with which the Team Lotus participated the first part of the F1 championship in 1983. It was the first Lotus car to use the Renault Gordini EF1 turbo engine and was the last F1 car designed by team founder Colin Chapman. In the championship the car was driven by Elio de Angelis, the other driver of the team, Nigel Mansell, raced with the Lotus 92, a car with the Ford Cosworth engine. The 93T was replaced in the course of the season with the Lotus 94T. Mansell drove the 93T car twice, in the 1983 German Grand Prix after he suffered problems with his 94T during the warm-up and had to revert to the older model, and much earlier in the year in a non-championship race, the 1983 Race of Champions at Brands Hatch, his first race in the turbo car. The 93T usually performed well in qualifying but suffered with reliability problems and came only once to the finish of a race.

Its design and development is the subject of the documentary made by the teams sponsors John Player & Sons (JPS) called Lotus Goes Turbo which follows the team's steps from Colin Chapman's announcement following the 1982 Austrian Grand Prix won by de Angelis that Lotus would switch from using the venerable old Cosworth DFV to join the ranks of the turbos from 1983, to Chapman's sudden death in 1982 and the design and construction of the teams first turbo car, the 93T while having to conform to FISA's new (and somewhat sudden) flat bottom regulations announced just 6 weeks prior to the season. It also covers the cars public launch in London and its first test session at the Circuit Paul Ricard in the south of France.

== Complete Formula One World Championship results ==
(key)

Year	Entrant	Engine	Tyres	Drivers	1	2	3	4	5	6	7	8	9	10	11	12	13	14	15	Points	WCC
1983	John Player Team Lotus	Renault Gordini EF1; V6 tc	P		BRA	USW	FRA	SMR	MON	BEL	DET	CAN	GBR	GER	AUT	NED	ITA	EUR	RSA	11*	8th
1983	John Player Team Lotus	Renault Gordini EF1; V6 tc	P	Elio de Angelis		Ret	Ret	Ret	Ret	9	Ret	Ret								11*	8th
1983	John Player Team Lotus	Renault Gordini EF1; V6 tc	P	Nigel Mansell										Ret						11*	8th

* All points scored using the Lotus 94T. Lotus-Renault placed 8th in the Constructors' Championship with 11 points. In addition, Lotus-Ford scored 1 point to place 13th in the Championship.
