= Lotus 92 =

Formula One racing car

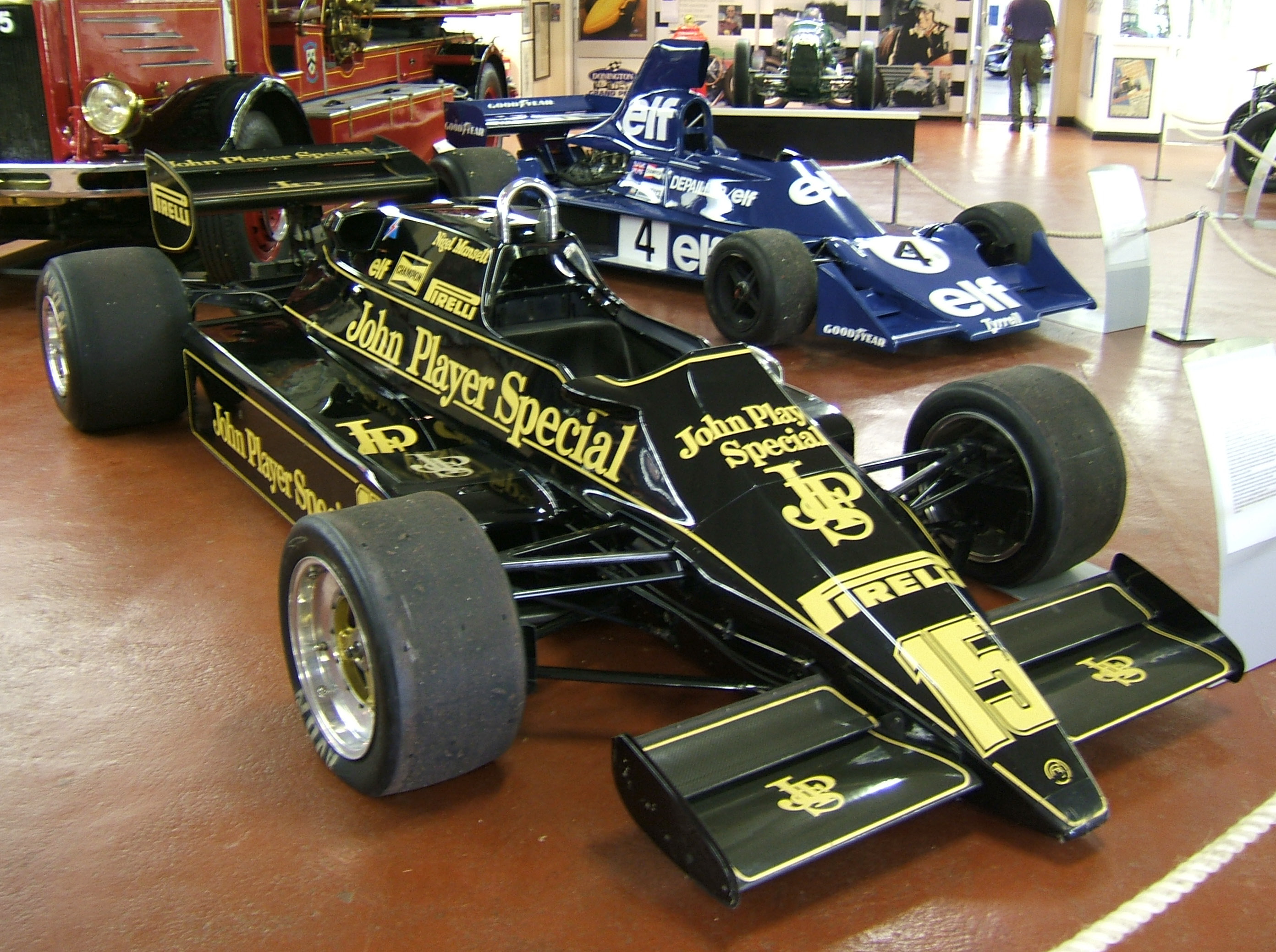
- Category: Formula One
- Constructor: Lotus
- Designers: Colin Chapman (Technical Director); Martin Ogilvie (Chief Designer); John Davis (Head of Aerodynamics and R&D)
- Predecessor: 91
- Successor: 93T

Technical specifications
- Chassis: Carbon fibre and Kevlar monocoque
- Suspension (front): Lotus Active suspension
- Suspension (rear): Lotus Active suspension
- Axle track: Front: 1,786 mm (70.3 in); Rear: 1,672 mm (65.8 in)
- Wheelbase: 2,799 mm (110.2 in)
- Engine: Cosworth DFV, 2,993 cc (182.6 cu in), 90° V8, NA, mid-engine, longitudinally mounted
- Transmission: Lotus / Hewland 5-speed manual
- Weight: 580 kg (1,280 lb)
- Fuel: Elf
- Tyres: Pirelli

Competition history
- Notable entrants: John Player Team Lotus
- Notable drivers: 11. (Italy) Elio de Angelis; 12. (United Kingdom) Nigel Mansell
- Debut: 1983 Brazilian Grand Prix
Races	Wins	Podiums	Poles	F/Laps
8	0	0	0	0
- Constructors' Championships: 0
- Drivers' Championships: 0

The Lotus 92 was a Formula One racing car designed by Martin Ogilvie along with Team Lotus founder Colin Chapman before Chapman died in December 1982. The 92 was used by Lotus in the first part of the 1983 Formula One season.

The car was driven regularly by Nigel Mansell and also in one race (the 1983 Brazilian Grand Prix) by Elio de Angelis. Engine problems on the warmup lap for de Angelis' Renault turbo-engined Lotus 93T forced him into the spare 92, which eventually led to his disqualification, for changing from a Renault-engined car to a Cosworth-engined one. The 92's best result was sixth place for Mansell at the Detroit Grand Prix.

The 92 was the last non-turbo car designed and raced by Lotus until the turbo engines were banned from the 1989 season. It was also the last Lotus car to carry the Cosworth DFY V8 engine (a development of the Keith Duckworth designed Cosworth DFV which Lotus had introduced to F1 in 1967), while also being the first Lotus to use active suspension. The suspension system gave much trouble and virtually eroded Mansell's confidence in such things. Though he would eventually win the F1 title 9 years later in a car with active suspension - the Williams FW14B.

== Complete Formula One results ==
(key)

Year	Entrant	Engine	Tyres	Drivers	1	2	3	4	5	6	7	8	9	10	11	12	13	14	15	Pts.	WCC
1983	John Player Team Lotus	Cosworth DFV; V8 NA	P		BRA	USW	FRA	SMR	MON	BEL	DET	CAN	GBR	GER	AUT	NED	ITA	EUR	RSA	1	12th
1983	John Player Team Lotus	Cosworth DFV; V8 NA	P	Elio de Angelis	DSQ															1	12th
1983	John Player Team Lotus	Cosworth DFV; V8 NA	P	Nigel Mansell	12	12	Ret	12	Ret	Ret	6	Ret								1	12th
