= 1983 Race of Champions =

Last non-championship Formula One race

- Non-championship race in the 1983 Formula One season

Race details
- Date: 10 April 1983
- Official name: Marlboro Race of Champions
- Location: Brands Hatch Grand Prix Circuit, Fawkham, Kent, England
- Course: Permanent racing facility
- Course length: 4.206 km (2.6136 miles)
- Distance: 40 laps, 168.24 km (104.544 miles)
- Weather: Warm, dry

Pole position
Driver	(Finland) Keke Rosberg	Williams-Cosworth
- Time: 1:15.766

Fastest lap
Driver	(France) René Arnoux	Ferrari
- Time: 1:17.826 on lap 18

Podium
First	(Finland) Keke Rosberg	Williams-Cosworth
Second	(United States) Danny Sullivan	Tyrrell-Cosworth
Third	(Australia) Alan Jones	Arrows-Cosworth

The 1983 Race of Champions was a non-championship Formula One (F1) race held at Brands Hatch on 10 April 1983. Contested over 40 laps, it was the final non-championship F1 race to be held in the sport's history (with exception of the Formula One Indoor Trophy sprint event held between 1988 and 1996). Reigning World Champion Keke Rosberg won in a Williams-Ford, narrowly beating the Tyrrell-Ford of F1 rookie Danny Sullivan, while 1980 World Champion Alan Jones was third in an Arrows-Ford. The Brands Hatch circuit would host an official World Championship round later that year under the European Grand Prix title.

== Report ==
=== Entry ===
Only thirteen cars were entered for the event, compared with the maximum grid of 26 starters which took part in the World Championship Grands Prix of 1983. The teams who did not attend, or only sent one of their two cars, were at a scheduled Formula One tyre test at the Paul Ricard Circuit in the south of France in preparation for the French Grand Prix which was held at the same circuit just one week later.

There were two drivers present who did not take part in that year's championship: Brian Henton, who drove a Theodore, and Héctor Rebaque, who drove a Brabham. The Spirit team also made its F1 debut at the event with Swedish driver Stefan Johansson and Honda's first turbo-charged F1 engine, which BBC commentator Murray Walker claimed had completed thousands of miles of trouble free testing. Tyrrell fronted with only one driver. Michele Alboreto was scheduled to race, but it clashed with his drive for Lancia in the opening round of the World Endurance Championship at Monza. Instead his rookie teammate, 32-year-old American Danny Sullivan, was given the opportunity to get more miles under race conditions having only completed in the previous two Grands Prix in Brazil and Long Beach. McLaren fronted with a car for John Watson, fresh from his victory in Long Beach just two weeks earlier. Arrows fronted with two cars, one for 1980 World Champion Alan Jones in his second (and final) drive for the team after making a comeback to F1 at Long Beach, and team driver Chico Serra.

Eleven teams took part, but only Arrows and Theodore entered more than one car. Brabham elected not to use either of its regular drivers Nelson Piquet or Riccardo Patrese, hence Rebaque's presence (he had previously driven for the team in 1981). Like Alboreto, Patrese was driving for Lancia at Monza, while Piquet was advertised to be driving but was actually at the scheduled tyre test at Paul Ricard, so Brabham fronted with Rebaque instead. This drew criticism from Murray Walker's co-commentator, 1976 World Champion James Hunt, who questioned why Brabham couldn't have put an up-and-coming British driver in the car for what really was a British domestic race. Williams fronted with one car for the reigning World Champion Keke Rosberg. The Williams race team was actually at Paul Ricard and Rosberg's car (the team's test car) was tended to by the team's test crew who were given the job by team boss Frank Williams as a reward for their hard work in developing the now flat bottomed Williams FW08C. Lotus used the event as an opportunity to familiarise Nigel Mansell with the Lotus 93T and its turbocharged Renault engine it had so far limited to the team's lead driver Elio de Angelis. Of the thirteen cars, four were turbos including the Ferrari of René Arnoux, although with the Lotus-Renault still new, Brabham without a regular driver and the Spirit-Honda on debut, only Arnoux was rated a chance of victory among the turbos.

=== Qualifying ===
Keke Rosberg took pole position in his Cosworth powered Williams, replicating the result at the previous year's British Grand Prix, also held at Brands Hatch, though without the ground effect his pole time of 1:15.766 was significantly slower than his 1982 pole time of 1:09.540. René Arnoux was less than one tenth of a second behind in his Ferrari turbo, and Alan Jones took an encouraging third place in his continuing comeback from retirement with Arrows. Behind John Watson's McLaren-Ford, the two Theodore drivers proved evenly matched in fifth and seventh, with regular driver Roberto Guerrero outpacing Henton. Sullivan qualified in sixth place despite suffering from jet lag, as he had only arrived in the United Kingdom from the United States the day before the track action began. Mansell qualified eighth with his first taste of a turbo engine in competitive conditions; he was followed by Raul Boesel in the Ligier, Rebaque's Brabham and Chico Serra in the other Arrows. Johansson set the second-fastest time in un-timed practice with a time that would have actually placed him 3rd on the grid, but suffered reliability problems in qualifying proper, restricting him to a single lap and 12th place on the grid in a difficult début for the Spirit team, but he still lined up ahead of Jean-Louis Schlesser, who failed to record a lap time for RAM March. The Spirit Honda again proved its speed in the race morning warm-up where Johansson reportedly was among the quickest on the circuit with times within one second of Arnoux's turbocharged Ferrari.

=== Race ===
Rosberg and Arnoux held their grid positions off the line, but Sullivan rose to third place after being given a nudge under braking for the first corner, the extra momentum forcing him into overtaking Jones around the outside instead of hitting him. Arnoux used the estimated 650 bhp (485 kW; 659 PS) available from his Ferrari 126C2B to blast past Rosberg on the straight at Pilgrims Drop on the first lap, but tyre trouble prevented him from pulling away. Guerrero was squeezed by Jones and Sullivan on the first corner which damaged his front wing so he had to pit at the end of the first lap. Johansson was the first retirement after four laps, the new Honda engine failing on its F1 début. Johansson had made a good start and had passed four cars before the Honda engine started to smoke going into Dingle Dell on lap 4 while chasing Rebaque. After a quiet first start with turbo power, Nigel Mansell ended his race with handling difficulties two laps later.

On lap seven, Arnoux, who had been passed for the lead by Rosberg going into Surtees, pitted for new tyres, his Ferrari wearing its rubber extremely quickly despite cool ambient temperatures (Arnoux also had major tyre troubles in practice and was lucky not to damage the car after blowing a rear tyre at speed on the run to Clearways). By lap 23 and two further stops, his team had no further sets of tyres and he was forced to retire with camshaft trouble, although he had set the fastest lap of the race as consolation, though his lap of 1:17.826 in the flat bottomed Ferrari was 5.458 seconds shy of Didier Pironi's lap record of 1:12.368 set at the 1980 British Grand Prix in a ground effects Ligier-Ford. Watson retired with a bad driveline vibration, while Rebaque retired with tyre and suspension failure in a car he wasn't totally comfortable with. In commentary, Murray Walker claimed that Rebaque looked at sea in the powerful Brabham-BMW, despite his recent experience in racing cars at the ultra-fast Indianapolis Motor Speedway and other oval speedways in the American-based CART series. Serra's car broke its gear linkage also retired from the race. This marked the second time in his career Rosberg had triumphed in a non-championship Formula One race, having won the BRDC International Trophy in at Silverstone in 1978 driving a Theodore.

At around half-distance of the forty-lap race, Rosberg also began to suffer from tyre wear, particularly blistering to his left-rear. Sullivan was using a softer-compound set of tyres, but had "scrubbed" them in the pre-race warm-up and had no such problems. For the final fifteen laps, he was right behind Rosberg, but never managed to overtake the Williams. Despite running side by side at places on the last lap, Rosberg held on to win from Sullivan, with Jones (still with two pins in his hip after breaking it falling off a horse on his farm in Australia) half a minute behind in third. Henton, Boesel, and the lapped Schlesser and Guerrero completed the finishers.

Rosberg would later add the championship Monaco Grand Prix to his victory haul in 1983, but the other finishers would not approach their results at this race in any other F1 Grand Prix in 1983. As the World Championship had become ever-more important in the increasingly commercial world of Formula One, the 1983 Race of Champions remains the final non-championship race to have been held in the sport's history, with exception of the Formula One Indoor Trophy sprint event held between 1988 and 1996.

== Classification ==
=== Entry list ===
No.	Driver	Entrant	Chassis	Engine	Tyres
1	(Finland) Keke Rosberg	TAG Williams Team	Williams FW08C	Ford Cosworth DFV 3.0 V8	G
4	(United States) Danny Sullivan	Benetton Tyrrell Team	Tyrrell 011	Ford Cosworth DFV 3.0 V8	G
5	(Mexico) Héctor Rebaque	Fila Sport	Brabham BT52	BMW M12/13 1.5 L4 (t/c)	MI
7	(United Kingdom) John Watson	Marlboro McLaren International Team	McLaren MP4/1C	Ford Cosworth DFV 3.0 V8	MI
12	(United Kingdom) Nigel Mansell	John Player Special Team Lotus	Lotus 93T	Renault EF1 1.5 V6 (t/c)	P
17	(France) Jean-Louis Schlesser	RAM Racing Team March	March-RAM 01	Ford Cosworth DFV 3.0 V8	P
26	(Brazil) Raul Boesel	Équipe Ligier Gitanes	Ligier JS21	Ford Cosworth DFV 3.0 V8	MI
28	(France) René Arnoux	Ferrari	Ferrari 126C2B	Ferrari 126C Tipo 021/3 1.5 V6 (t/c)	G
29	(Brazil) Chico Serra	Arrows Racing Team	Arrows A6	Ford Cosworth DFV 3.0 V8	G
30	(Australia) Alan Jones	Arrows Racing Team	Arrows A6	Ford Cosworth DFV 3.0 V8	G
33	(Colombia) Roberto Guerrero	Theodore Racing Team	Theodore N183	Ford Cosworth DFV 3.0 V8	G
34	(United Kingdom) Brian Henton	Theodore Racing Team	Theodore N183	Ford Cosworth DFV 3.0 V8	G
40	(Sweden) Stefan Johansson	Spirit Racing	Spirit 201C	Honda RA163-E 1.5 V6 (t/c)	G

=== Qualifying ===
Pos.	No.	Driver	Team	Lap	Gap
1	1	(Finland) Keke Rosberg	Williams-Cosworth	1:15.766	—
2	28	(France) René Arnoux	Ferrari	1:15.839	+0.073
3	30	(Australia) Alan Jones	Arrows-Cosworth	1:17.501	+1.735
4	7	(United Kingdom) John Watson	McLaren-Cosworth	1:18.062	+2.296
5	33	(Colombia) Roberto Guerrero	Theodore-Cosworth	1:18.862	+2.680
6	4	(United States) Danny Sullivan	Tyrrell-Cosworth	1:18.446	+2.783
7	34	(United Kingdom) Brian Henton	Theodore-Cosworth	1:18.549	+3.096
8	12	(United Kingdom) Nigel Mansell	Lotus-Renault	1:18.894	+3.128
9	26	(Brazil) Raul Boesel	Ligier-Cosworth	1:19.236	+3.470
10	5	(Mexico) Héctor Rebaque	Brabham-BMW	1:19.592	+3.826
11	29	(Brazil) Chico Serra	Arrows-Cosworth	1:22.402	+6.636
12	40	(Sweden) Stefan Johansson	Spirit-Honda	1:35.500	+19.734
13	17	(France) Jean-Louis Schlesser	RAM March-Cosworth	No time	—

=== Race ===
Pos.	No.	Driver	Team	Laps	Time/Retired
1	1	(Finland) Keke Rosberg	Williams-Cosworth	40	53:15.253
2	4	(United States) Danny Sullivan	Tyrrell-Cosworth	40	+0.490
3	30	(Australia) Alan Jones	Arrows-Cosworth	40	+28.642
4	34	(United Kingdom) Brian Henton	Theodore-Cosworth	40	+40.520
5	26	(Brazil) Raul Boesel	Ligier-Cosworth	40	+40.971
6	17	(France) Jean-Louis Schlesser	RAM March-Cosworth	39	+1 lap
7	33	(Colombia) Roberto Guerrero	Theodore-Cosworth	39	+1 lap
Ret	29	(Brazil) Chico Serra	Arrows-Cosworth	30	Gear linkage
Ret	28	(France) René Arnoux	Ferrari	23	Tyres/Camshaft
Ret	5	(Mexico) Héctor Rebaque	Brabham-BMW	14	Tyres/Suspension
Ret	7	(United Kingdom) John Watson	McLaren-Cosworth	8	Transmission
Ret	12	(United Kingdom) Nigel Mansell	Lotus-Renault	6	Handling
Ret	40	(Sweden) Stefan Johansson	Spirit-Honda	4	Engine

- Fastest lap: René Arnoux, 1:17.826 (lap 18)
- Lap leaders: René Arnoux (1–6), Keke Rosberg (7–40)

Previous race: 1981 South African Grand Prix	Formula One non-championship races 1983 season	Next race: —
Previous race: 1979 Race of Champions	Race of Champions	Next race: —
