= 1983 British Grand Prix =

- Race 9 of 15 in the 1983 Formula One World Championship
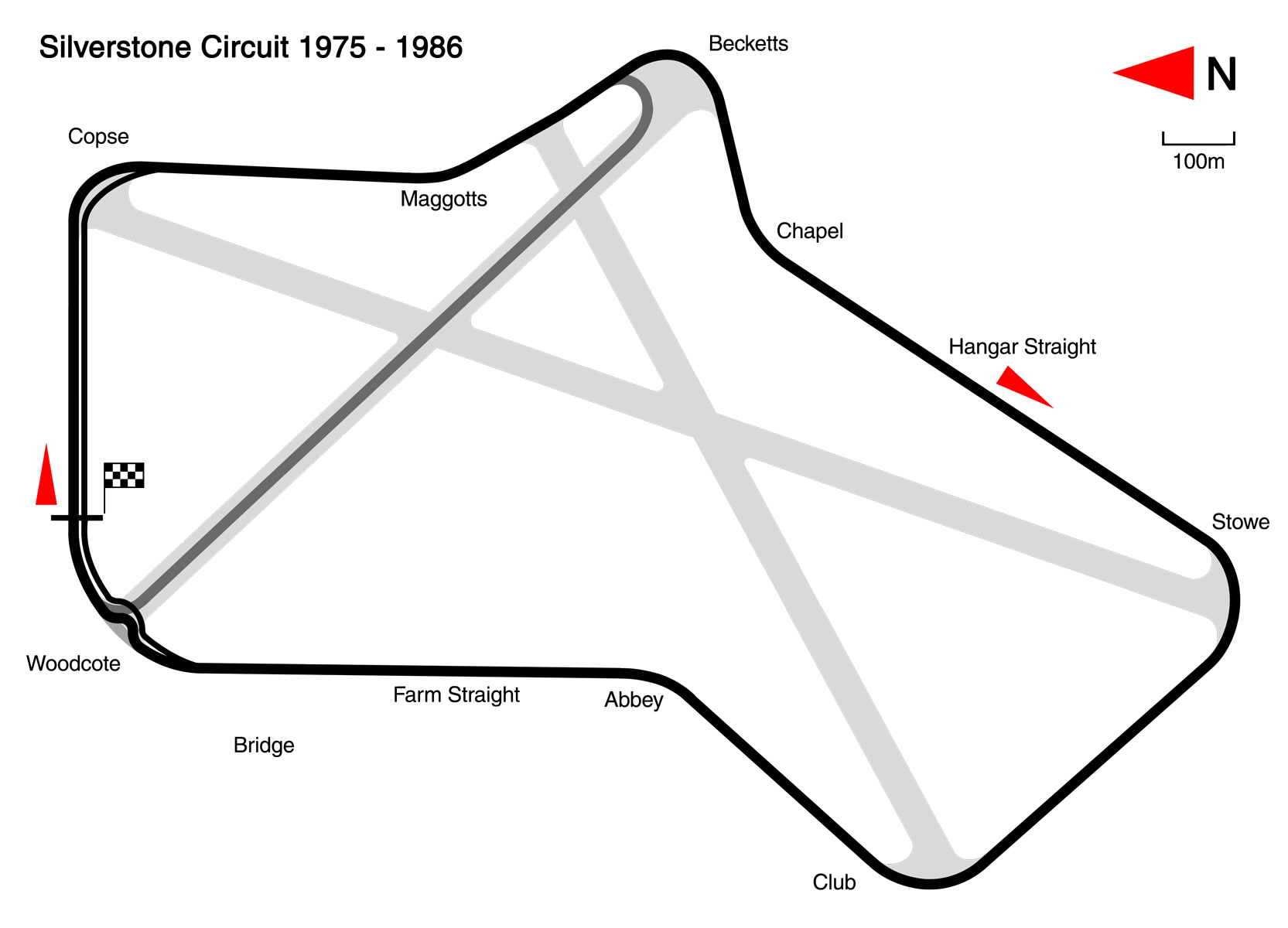

Race details
- Date: 16 July 1983
- Official name: XXXVI Marlboro British Grand Prix
- Location: Silverstone Circuit, Northamptonshire, Great Britain
- Course: Permanent racing facility
- Course length: 4.719 km (2.932 miles)
- Distance: 67 laps, 316.173 km (196.461 miles)

Pole position
Driver	(France) René Arnoux	Ferrari
- Time: 1:09.462

Fastest lap
Driver	(France) Alain Prost	Renault
- Time: 1:14.212 on lap 32

Podium
First	(France) Alain Prost	Renault
Second	(Brazil) Nelson Piquet	Brabham-BMW
Third	(France) Patrick Tambay	Ferrari

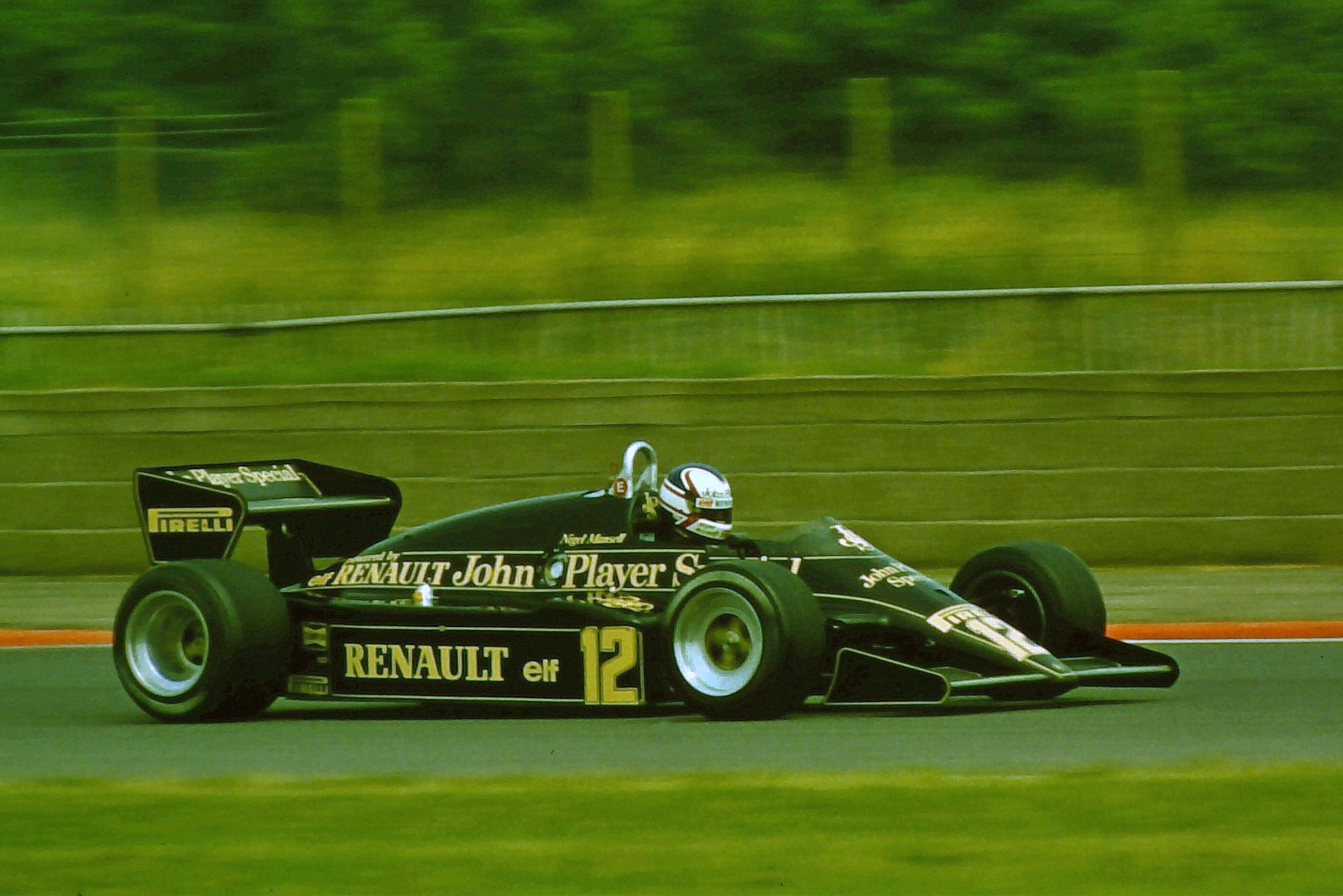
Nigel Mansell finished fourth in a Lotus 94T.

The 1983 British Grand Prix (formally the XXXVI Marlboro British Grand Prix) was a Formula One motor race held at Silverstone on 16 July 1983. It was the ninth race of the 1983 Formula One World Championship.

The 67-lap race was won by Alain Prost, driving a factory Renault, after he started from third position. Nelson Piquet finished second in a Brabham-BMW, with Patrick Tambay third in a Ferrari. The win, Prost's third of the season, enabled him to extend his lead in the Drivers' Championship to six points.

== Qualifying ==
=== Qualifying report ===
The front row of the grid was filled by the Ferraris of René Arnoux and Patrick Tambay, Arnoux over 0.6 seconds ahead. Arnoux created history with his lap as he was the first driver ever to lap Silverstone in under 70 seconds. Drivers' Championship leader Alain Prost was third in his Renault, with Elio de Angelis in the Lotus alongside him on the second row. The two Brabhams made up the third row with Riccardo Patrese ahead of Nelson Piquet, while on the fourth row were Eddie Cheever in the second Renault and Manfred Winkelhock in the ATS. Completing the top ten were Andrea de Cesaris in the Alfa Romeo and Derek Warwick in the Toleman. Further down the grid, the Spirit team with its Honda turbo engine made an impressive debut as Stefan Johansson qualified 14th, ahead of both McLarens and just one place behind reigning World Champion Keke Rosberg in the Williams.

Reigning World Champion Rosberg, the fastest of the non-turbos, was some 4.293 seconds slower than Arnoux. Soon to be local hero Nigel Mansell, having his first Grand Prix in the Lotus Renault, qualified 18th after a troubled practice in sorting the new car. Mansell had raced in the non-championship 1983 Race of Champions at Brands Hatch in the turbo powered Lotus 93T earlier in the season, but until Silverstone his only Grands Prix were in the Ford powered cars.

=== Qualifying classification ===
Pos	No	Driver	Constructor	Q1	Q2	Gap
1	28	(France) René Arnoux	Ferrari	1:10.436	1:09.462	
2	27	(France) Patrick Tambay	Ferrari	1:10.874	1:10.104	+0.642
3	15	(France) Alain Prost	Renault	1:10.170	1:10.808	+0.708
4	11	(Italy) Elio de Angelis	Lotus-Renault	1:10.771	1:11.114	+1.309
5	6	(Italy) Riccardo Patrese	Brabham-BMW	1:11.246	1:10.881	+1.419
6	5	(Brazil) Nelson Piquet	Brabham-BMW	1:11.098	1:10.933	+1.471
7	16	(United States) Eddie Cheever	Renault	1:11.055	1:11.520	+1.593
8	9	(West Germany) Manfred Winkelhock	ATS-BMW	1:13.493	1:11.687	+2.225
9	22	(Italy) Andrea de Cesaris	Alfa Romeo	1:13.163	1:12.150	+2.688
10	35	(United Kingdom) Derek Warwick	Toleman-Hart	1:12.528	1:12.541	+3.066
11	23	(Italy) Mauro Baldi	Alfa Romeo	1:14.006	1:12.860	+3.398
12	36	(Italy) Bruno Giacomelli	Toleman-Hart	1:13.792	1:13.422	+3.960
13	1	(Finland) Keke Rosberg	Williams-Ford	1:13.755	no time	+4.293
14	40	(Sweden) Stefan Johansson	Spirit-Honda	1:15.535	1:13.962	+4.500
15	8	(Austria) Niki Lauda	McLaren-Ford	1:14.267	1:15.118	+4.805
16	3	(Italy) Michele Alboreto	Tyrrell-Ford	1:14.651	1:14.970	+5.189
17	30	(Belgium) Thierry Boutsen	Arrows-Ford	1:14.964	1:15.686	+5.502
18	12	(United Kingdom) Nigel Mansell	Lotus-Renault	1:16.377	1:15.133	+5.671
19	29	(Switzerland) Marc Surer	Arrows-Ford	1:15.135	1:15.350	+5.673
20	2	(France) Jacques Laffite	Williams-Ford	1:15.234	1:16.762	+5.772
21	33	(Colombia) Roberto Guerrero	Theodore-Ford	1:15.441	1:15.317	+5.855
22	26	(Brazil) Raul Boesel	Ligier-Ford	1:15.386	1:16.134	+5.924
23	4	(United States) Danny Sullivan	Tyrrell-Ford	1:15.449	1:16.347	+5.987
24	7	(United Kingdom) John Watson	McLaren-Ford	1:15.609	1:16.091	+6.147
25	25	(France) Jean-Pierre Jarier	Ligier-Ford	1:15.383†	1:15.767	+6.305
26	32	(Italy) Piercarlo Ghinzani	Osella-Alfa Romeo	1:17.162	1:16.544	+7.082
27	34	(Venezuela) Johnny Cecotto	Theodore-Ford	1:16.714	1:16.786	+7.252
28	31	(Italy) Corrado Fabi	Osella-Alfa Romeo	1:20.400	1:17.594	+8.132
29	17	(United Kingdom) Kenny Acheson	RAM-Ford	1:19.267	1:18.103	+8.641

- † — Time disallowed.

== Race ==
=== Race report ===
In the race morning warmup, Elio de Angelis showed he and his Lotus-Renault turbo would be one to watch, posting the fastest time of the session. At the start of the race, Tambay moved ahead of Arnoux, while de Angelis quickly went from hero to zero, retiring on just the second lap with turbo failure heading into Becketts. The somewhat angry Italian pulled off onto the infield, threw his belts off, got out of his car and stalked back to the Lotus pits. While they would ultimately win through Prost plus would gain 4th place with Nigel Mansell's stirring drive in his first GP in the Lotus-Renault in front of the home crowd, early on things were turning a bit sour for Renault. First de Angelis was out, then the second factory car of Cheever retired when his engine failed on lap 4. Then Stefan Johansson joined the growing list of retirements on lap 6 with fuel system problems in the Spirit-Honda. When Patrese's turbo gave up on lap 10, Piquet moved up to fourth behind the Ferraris and Prost, with de Cesaris fifth and Winkelhock sixth. Prost overtook Arnoux on lap 14, followed by Piquet five laps later. Then, on lap 20, Prost passed Tambay for the lead, with Piquet moving into second on lap 31. In the later stages of the race, Winkelhock's engine failed and de Cesaris dropped behind teammate Mauro Baldi, while Mansell, who had qualified a lowly 18th in the second Lotus (the slowest turbo qualifier), made a charge through the field that would become his signature over the coming years, finally passing Arnoux for fourth on lap 48. At the chequered flag, Prost was 19 seconds ahead of Piquet with Tambay, Mansell, Arnoux and Niki Lauda completing the top six. One lap down on Prost, Lauda was the only Cosworth powered car to finish in the points on a track which clearly suited the more powerful turbos.

In the Drivers' Championship, Prost doubled his lead over Piquet to six points, with Tambay two points further back. Renault moved into the outright lead of the Constructors' Championship, three points ahead of Ferrari.

=== Race classification ===
Pos	No	Driver	Constructor	Tyre	Laps	Time/Retired	Grid	Points
1	15	(France) Alain Prost	Renault	MI	67	1:24:39.780	3	9
2	5	(Brazil) Nelson Piquet	Brabham-BMW	MI	67	+ 19.161	6	6
3	27	(France) Patrick Tambay	Ferrari	G	67	+ 26.246	2	4
4	12	(United Kingdom) Nigel Mansell	Lotus-Renault	P	67	+ 38.952	18	3
5	28	(France) René Arnoux	Ferrari	G	67	+ 58.874	1	2
6	8	(Austria) Niki Lauda	McLaren-Ford	MI	66	+ 1 Lap	15	1
7	23	(Italy) Mauro Baldi	Alfa Romeo	MI	66	+ 1 Lap	11	
8	22	(Italy) Andrea de Cesaris	Alfa Romeo	MI	66	+ 1 Lap	9	
9	7	(United Kingdom) John Watson	McLaren-Ford	MI	66	+ 1 Lap	24	
10	25	(France) Jean-Pierre Jarier	Ligier-Ford	MI	65	+ 2 Laps	25	
11	1	(Finland) Keke Rosberg	Williams-Ford	G	65	+ 2 Laps	13	
12	2	(France) Jacques Laffite	Williams-Ford	G	65	+ 2 Laps	20	
13	3	(Italy) Michele Alboreto	Tyrrell-Ford	G	65	+ 2 Laps	16	
14	4	(United States) Danny Sullivan	Tyrrell-Ford	G	65	+ 2 Laps	23	
15	30	(Belgium) Thierry Boutsen	Arrows-Ford	G	65	+ 2 Laps	17	
16	33	(Colombia) Roberto Guerrero	Theodore-Ford	G	64	+ 3 Laps	21	
17	29	(Switzerland) Marc Surer	Arrows-Ford	G	64	+ 3 Laps	19	
Ret	9	(West Germany) Manfred Winkelhock	ATS-BMW	G	49	Engine	8	
Ret	26	(Brazil) Raul Boesel	Ligier-Ford	MI	48	Suspension	22	
Ret	32	(Italy) Piercarlo Ghinzani	Osella-Alfa Romeo	MI	46	Fuel system	26	
Ret	35	(United Kingdom) Derek Warwick	Toleman-Hart	P	27	Gearbox	10	
Ret	6	(Italy) Riccardo Patrese	Brabham-BMW	MI	9	Turbo	5	
Ret	40	(Sweden) Stefan Johansson	Spirit-Honda	G	5	Fuel system	14	
Ret	16	(United States) Eddie Cheever	Renault	MI	3	Engine	7	
Ret	36	(Italy) Bruno Giacomelli	Toleman-Hart	P	3	Turbo	12	
Ret	11	(Italy) Elio de Angelis	Lotus-Renault	P	1	Turbo	4	
DNQ	34	(Venezuela) Johnny Cecotto	Theodore-Ford	G				
DNQ	31	(Italy) Corrado Fabi	Osella-Alfa Romeo	MI				
DNQ	17	(United Kingdom) Kenny Acheson	RAM-Ford	P				

== Championship standings after the race ==
Drivers' Championship standings

Pos	Driver	Points
1	(France) Alain Prost	39
2	(Brazil) Nelson Piquet	33
3	(France) Patrick Tambay	31
4	(Finland) Keke Rosberg	25
5	(France) René Arnoux	19

Constructors' Championship standings

Pos	Constructor	Points
1	(France) Renault	53
2	(Italy) Ferrari	50
3	(United Kingdom) Williams-Ford	35
4	(United Kingdom) Brabham-BMW	33
5	(United Kingdom) McLaren-Ford	27

- Note: Only the top five positions are included for both sets of standings.

Previous race: 1983 Canadian Grand Prix	FIA Formula One World Championship; 1983 season	Next race: 1983 German Grand Prix
Previous race: 1982 British Grand Prix	British Grand Prix	Next race: 1984 British Grand Prix
