= Lotus 95T =

Formula One racing car

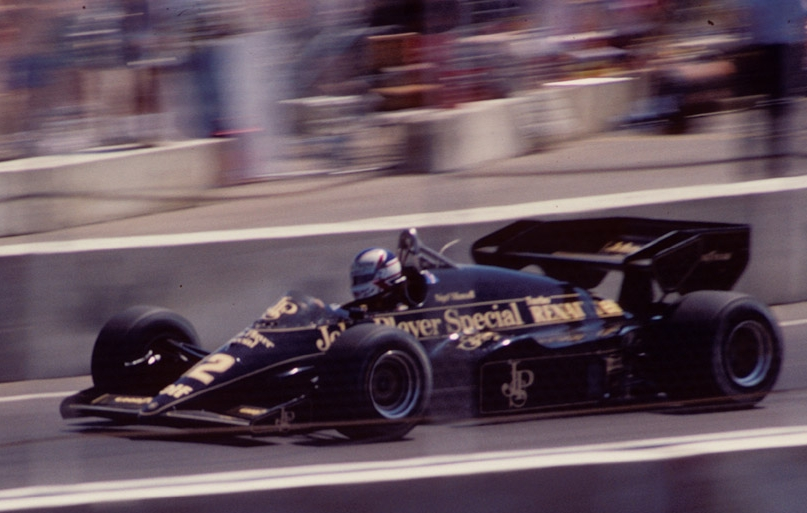
- Category: Formula One
- Constructor: Lotus
- Designers: Gérard Ducarouge (Technical Director); Martin Ogilvie (Chief Designer); John Davis (Head of Aerodynamics and R&D)
- Predecessor: 94T
- Successor: 97T

Technical specifications
- Chassis: Kevlar / Nomex honeycomb monocoque
- Suspension (front): Double-wishbones, pull-rod, coil springs
- Suspension (rear): Double-wishbones, pull-rod, coil springs
- Axle track: Front: 1,800 mm (71 in); Rear: 1,700 mm (67 in)
- Wheelbase: 2,775 mm (109.3 in)
- Engine: Renault Gordini EF4, 1,492 cc (91.0 cu in), 90° V6, turbocharged, mid-engine, longitudinally-mounted
- Transmission: Lotus / Hewland 5-speed manual
- Power: 750–760 hp (559.3–566.7 kW) @ 11,500 rpm
- Weight: 540 kg (1,190 lb)
- Fuel: Elf
- Tyres: Goodyear

Competition history
- Notable entrants: John Player Team Lotus
- Notable drivers: 11. (Italy) Elio de Angelis; 12. (United Kingdom) Nigel Mansell
- Debut: 1984 Brazilian Grand Prix
Races	Wins	Podiums	Poles	F/Laps
16	0	6	2	0
- Constructors' Championships: 0
- Drivers' Championships: 0

The Lotus 95T was a Formula One racing car designed by Gérard Ducarouge for use by Team Lotus in the 1984 Formula One World Championship. The car brought Lotus its best results for several seasons, frequently reaching the podium.

== Design ==
The car was powered by the Renault Gordini EF4 V6 turbo engine and ran on Goodyear tyres, after Lotus had switched from Pirelli. It was a development of the Lotus 94T, which had proved competitive at the end of 1983.

The chassis of the 95T was praised by the editor of the AUTOCOURSE annual in 1984 as the best handling of the season during the annual's team by team review. The technical review of the 95T was particularly positive of the Lotus mechanical grip in slow corners, mentioning that it was equal, if not slightly better than the McLaren MP4/2. The AUTOCOURSE editor reported that the McLaren was more aerodynamically efficient and was better in fast corners, but netherless praised the leadership of Gerard Ducarouge's technical directorship in reviving Lotus in 1984 after a dismal (in terms of results) 1983 season.

== Season summary ==
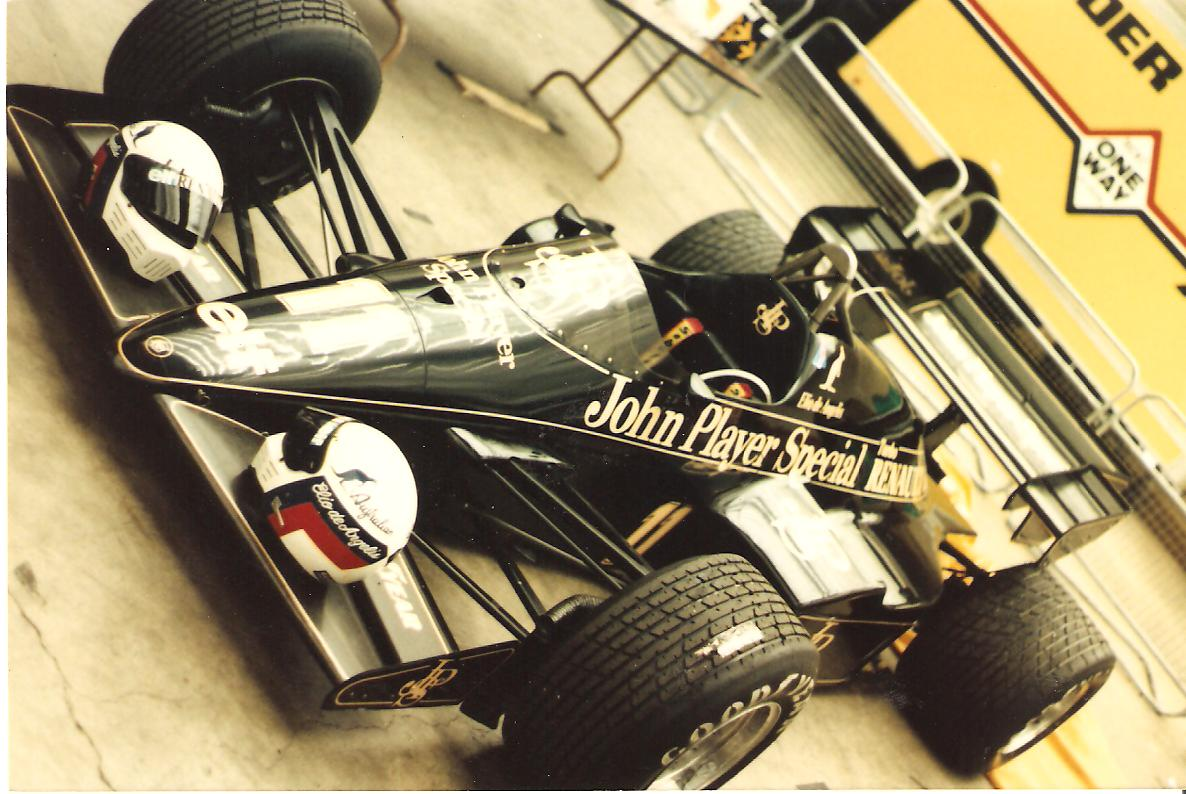
The 95T of Elio de Angelis at the 1984 Detroit Grand Prix

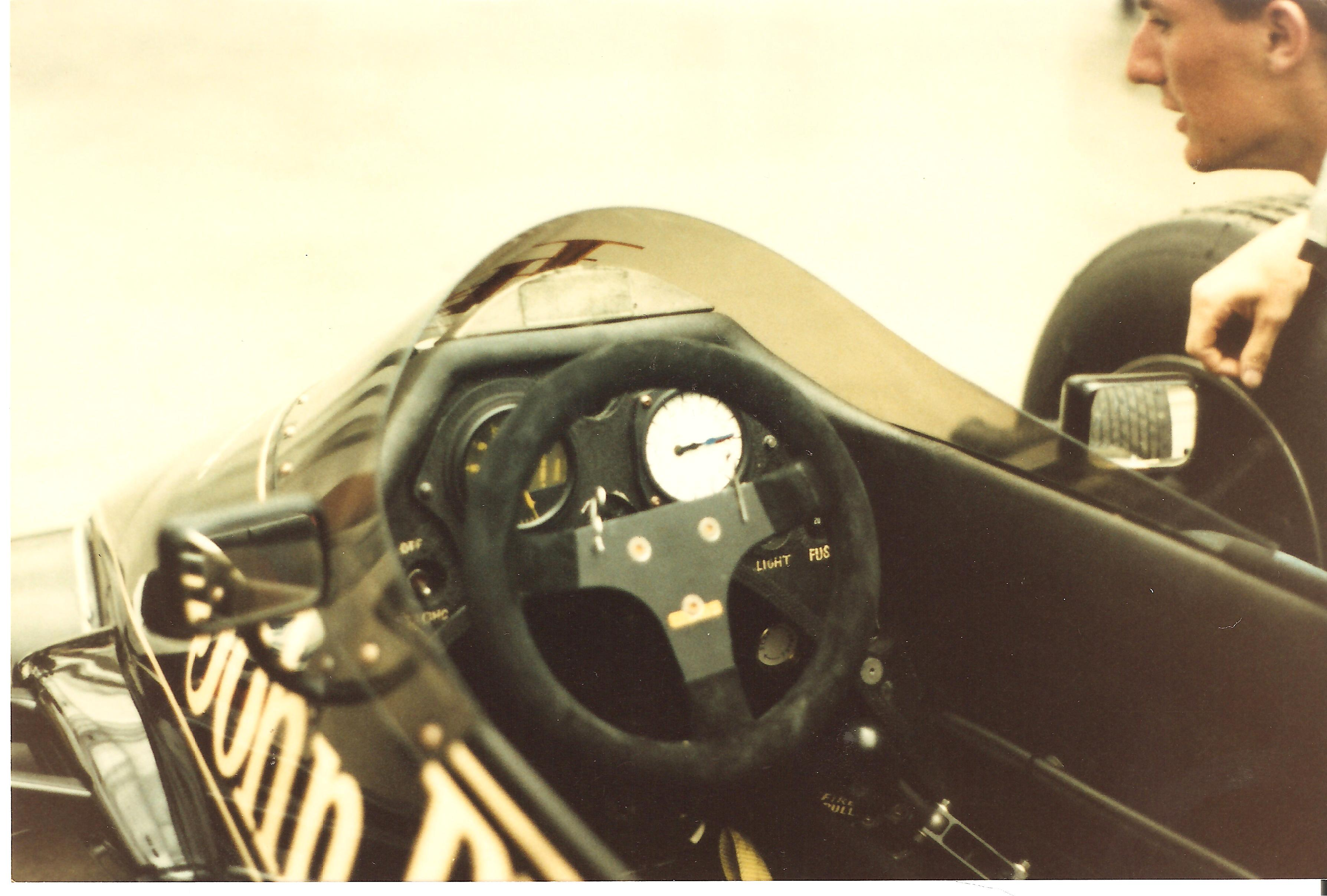
Cockpit of the 95T

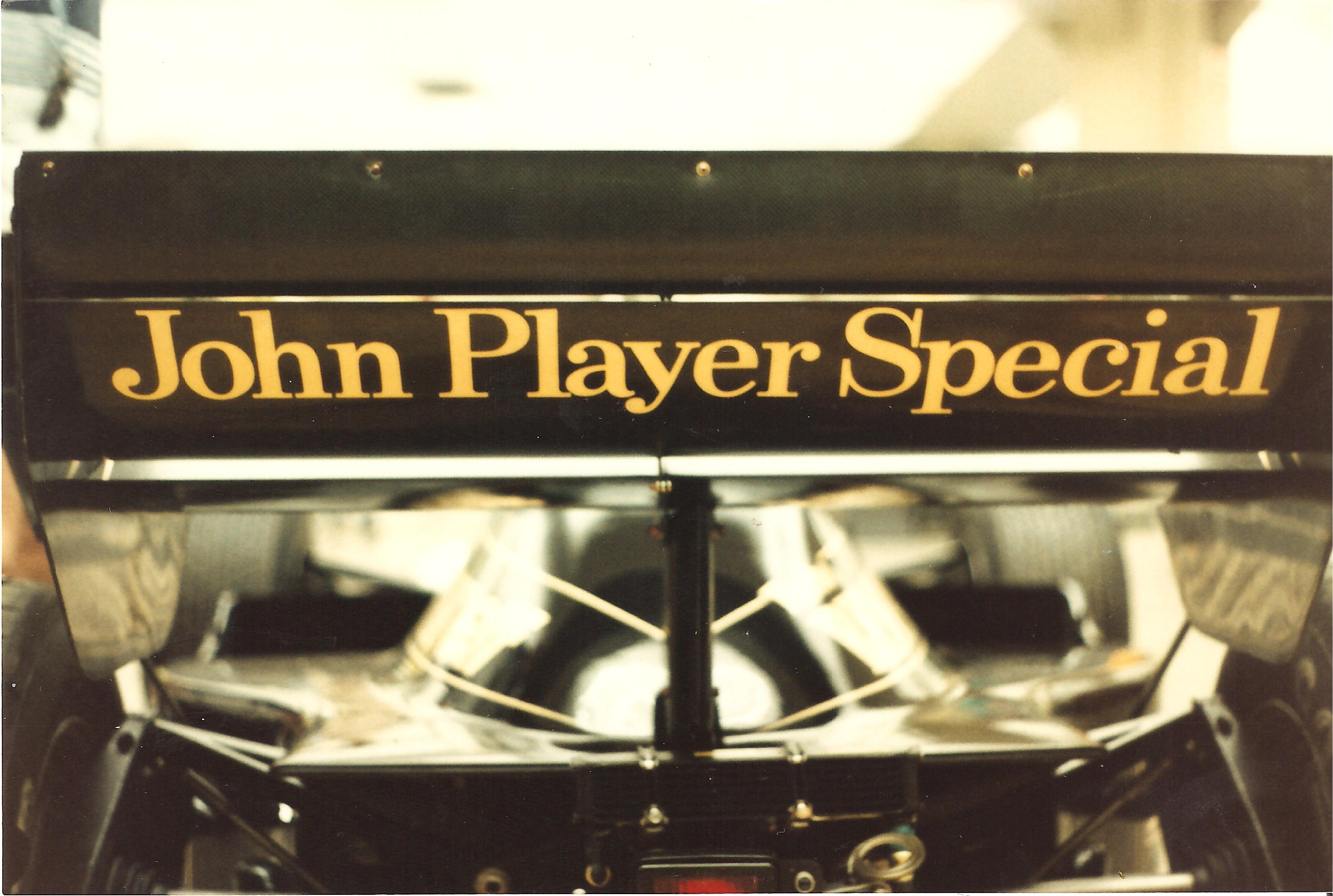
Rear wing of the 95T

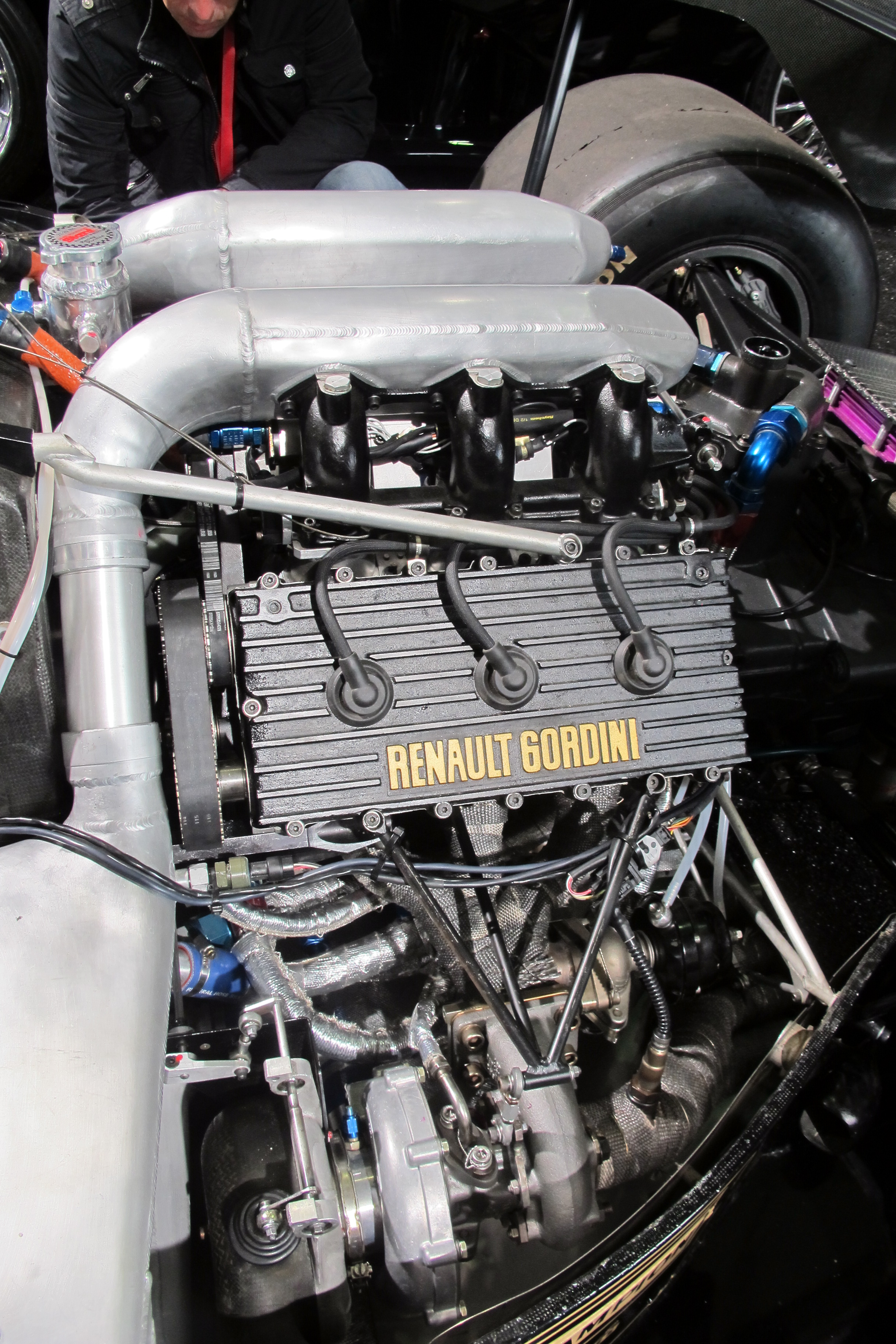
Renault Gordini EF4 engine in the 95T

The car was driven by Elio de Angelis and Nigel Mansell, both of whom were consistently competitive in a season otherwise dominated by McLaren. De Angelis finished in the top five on eleven occasions, including four podium finishes; he also took pole position at the opening race in Brazil. With 34 points, he was third in the Drivers' Championship.

Mansell, meanwhile, finished third in France and the Netherlands, and was running second in the final race in Portugal when his brakes failed (which handed Niki Lauda the Drivers' Championship by half a point from Alain Prost). However, he also crashed out of the lead at a rain-hit Monaco (which prompted team boss Peter Warr, with whom he had a difficult relationship, to famously declare, "He'll never win a Grand Prix as long as I have a hole in my arse"), and in oppressive heat at Dallas he took pole position and led the first half of the race, before his gearbox failed on the final lap and he collapsed from exhaustion trying to push the car to the finish line. He ultimately finished equal ninth in the Drivers' Championship with 13 points, the same tally as Ayrton Senna, who would replace him for 1985.

With a total of 47 points, Lotus placed third in the Constructors' Championship, its best placing since 1978. The 95T was seen by many in Formula One as being as good as the dominant McLaren MP4/2, its biggest problems being the tyres, the gearbox and the Renault engine, which despite being powerful and reliable was not as fuel-efficient as the TAG-Porsche engine in the McLaren. Nonetheless, the car had helped to re-establish Lotus as consistent front-runners, and would be succeeded for 1985 by a further development, the Lotus 97T.

== After Formula One ==
Mansell's 95T was auctioned by Mecum Auctions in Monterey, California in August 2013, with a pre-sale estimate of between $500,000 and $600,000. However, it failed to sell.

== Complete Formula One results ==
(key) (results in bold indicate pole position)

Year	Team	Engine	Tyres	Drivers	1	2	3	4	5	6	7	8	9	10	11	12	13	14	15	16	Points	WCC
1984	John Player Team Lotus	Renault Gordini EF4; V6 tc	**G**		BRA	RSA	BEL	SMR	FRA	MON	CAN	DET	DAL	GBR	GER	AUT	NED	ITA	EUR	POR	**47**	**3rd**
1984	John Player Team Lotus	Renault Gordini EF4; V6 tc	**G**	Elio de Angelis	**3**	7	5	3	5	5	4	2	3	4	Ret	Ret	4	Ret	Ret	5	**47**	**3rd**
1984	John Player Team Lotus	Renault Gordini EF4; V6 tc	**G**	Nigel Mansell	Ret	Ret	Ret	Ret	3	Ret	6	Ret	**6**	Ret	4	Ret	3	Ret	Ret	Ret	**47**	**3rd**
