= Lotus 97T =

Formula One racing car

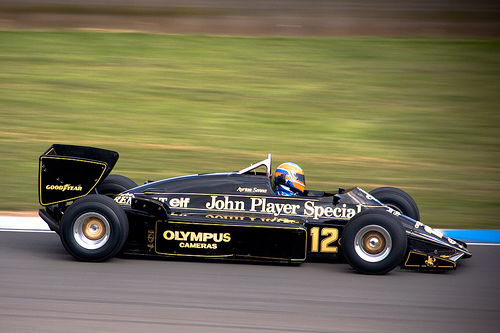
- Category: Formula One
- Constructor: Lotus
- Designers: Gérard Ducarouge (Technical Director); Martin Ogilvie (Chief Designer); Mike Coughlan (Assistant Chief Designer); John Davis (Head of Aerodynamics and R&D)
- Predecessor: 95T
- Successor: 98T

Technical specifications
- Chassis: Carbon fibre monocoque
- Suspension (front): Springs, pullrods, double wishbones
- Suspension (rear): Springs, pullrods, double wishbones
- Axle track: Front: 1,740 mm (69 in); Rear: 1,630 mm (64 in)
- Wheelbase: 2,730 mm (107 in)
- Engine: Renault Gordini EF15B 1,492 cc (91.0 cu in) 90° V6 turbocharged mid-engine, longitudinally-mounted
- Transmission: Lotus / Hewland 5-speed manual
- Power: 760–810 hp (566.7–604.0 kW) @ 11,500 - 12,500 rpm
- Weight: 540 kg (1,190.5 lb)
- Fuel: Elf
- Tyres: Goodyear

Competition history
- Notable entrants: John Player Team Lotus
- Notable drivers: 11. (Italy) Elio de Angelis; 12. (Brazil) Ayrton Senna
- Debut: 1985 Brazilian Grand Prix
Races	Wins	Podiums	Poles	F/Laps
16	3	9	8	3
- Constructors' Championships: 0
- Drivers' Championships: 0

The Lotus 97T was a Formula One racing car designed by Gérard Ducarouge and built by Team Lotus for use in the 1985 Formula One World Championship. A development of the previous year's 95T, the car was powered by the turbocharged 1.5-litre Renault EF15B V6 engine and ran on Goodyear tyres.

== Background ==
=== Chassis ===
The 97T was of a generally simple design, it used elements from the defunct Lotus 96T Indycar project in the aerodynamics with another piece of Lotus design: an early form of bargeboards. These were placed between the front wheels and the side pods improving airflow around the side of the car. Ducarouge also got around the ban on the 'winglets' seen on the rear wings of the 1984 cars by placing them instead on the rear edges of the side pods.

=== Drivers ===
Lotus' major coup for 1985 was signing rising star Ayrton Senna from the Toleman team to replace long time team driver Nigel Mansell who had signed with Williams. Senna, the first driver signed to the team since the death of Colin Chapman, partnered Italian Elio de Angelis who had finished third in the previous season's drivers' championship and had had many promising results with the 95T.

== Racing history ==
The 97T proved competitive during the season, taking 8 poles, 7 with Senna and 1 with de Angelis, and 3 wins. Senna's first was a brilliant performance in the Portuguese Grand Prix where he won by over a minute in monsoon conditions. His second came in the Belgian Grand Prix at Spa, held in wet/dry conditions. De Angelis added a third win (his 2nd and last win in F1, both for Lotus) at the San Marino Grand Prix after original winner Alain Prost (McLaren) was disqualified an hour after the race finished due to his out of fuel McLaren-TAG being 2 kg underweight. Lotus finished fourth in the Constructors' Championship, albeit tied on points with Williams who finished in third place owing to their greater number of race victories.

The 97T marked the start of a brief return to the successful days of the 1960s and 1970s for Lotus, which was continued by the 98T of 1986 and the Honda-powered 99T of 1987. The 97T had perhaps the best handling of any car in the 1985 season, and it was at its most competitive on tight, slow street circuits such as Monaco, Detroit and Adelaide, although it was also competitive on almost every other type of circuit it raced on. However the Renault engine had issues with unreliability and fuel consumption; Senna and de Angelis suffered at high-speed tracks, which were more demanding on fuel consumption, so they had to turn down the turbo boost to save fuel and possibly the engine as well, although de Angelis likely caught on to this earlier than Senna, as the Italian consistently finished in the points in the beginning of the season whereas Senna failed to finish in all but one race before the Austrian Grand Prix. Like a number of others Senna ran out of fuel at Imola, which was the hardest track of the year on fuel consumption, and he again ran out of fuel at Silverstone after a hard battle with Alain Prost. The Renault engine in Senna's car blew up at Monaco, France (which caused him to have an enormous accident at the fastest corner), Germany, South Africa and Australia, while de Angelis suffered engine failure at Germany, Belgium and South Africa.

== Other ==
Senna's 97T was added to Gran Turismo 6 via the May 2014 update as part of the game's new feature "Ayrton Senna Tribute" in two liveries: the Gold Leaf livery (identical to that of de Angelis's 97T apart from the driver number and name) and an in-game only "Team Lotus Special" livery (which was used instead of "John Player Special" due to tobacco advertising regulations).

== Gallery ==
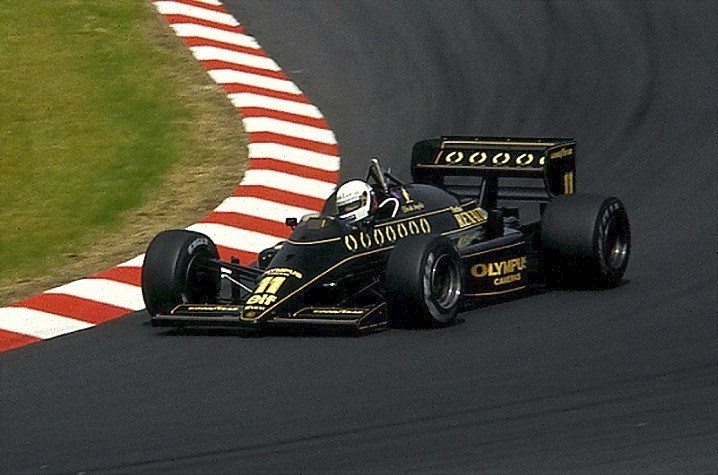
Elio de Angelis driving the 97T at the 1985 German Grand Prix, with a livery used in Germany and the United Kingdom due to a contemporary ban on tobacco advertising.

== Complete Formula One results ==
(key) (Results in bold indicate pole position; results in italics indicate fastest lap)

Year	Team	Engine	Tyres	Drivers	1	2	3	4	5	6	7	8	9	10	11	12	13	14	15	16	Points	WCC
1985	John Player Team Lotus	Renault Gordini; EF4B / EF15; V6 tc	**G**		BRA	POR	SMR	MON	CAN	DET	FRA	GBR	GER	AUT	NED	ITA	BEL	EUR	RSA	AUS	**71**	**4th**
1985	John Player Team Lotus	Renault Gordini; EF4B / EF15; V6 tc	**G**	Elio de Angelis	3	4	1	3	**5**	5	5	NC	Ret	5	5	6	Ret	5	Ret	DSQ	**71**	**4th**
1985	John Player Team Lotus	Renault Gordini; EF4B / EF15; V6 tc	**G**	Ayrton Senna	Ret	**1**	**7**†	**Ret**	16	**Ret**	Ret	10†	Ret	2	3	**3**	1	**2**	Ret	**Ret**	**71**	**4th**

-Lotus finished with the same number of points as the Williams team, but because Williams won one more race than Lotus (Nigel Mansell and Keke Rosberg each won 2 races for Williams while Senna won 2 and de Angelis won 1 race for Lotus), that put Williams third and Lotus fourth in the Constructor's championship.

== See also ==

- McLaren MP4/2
- Williams FW11
