= Gérard Ducarouge =

French Formula One car designer

- Born: 3 October 1941; Paray-le-Monial, Saône-et-Loire, France
- Died: 19 February 2015 (aged 73); Neuilly-sur-Seine, France
- Occupations: Motorsport engineer and designer
- Years active: 1964–2015
- Known for: Formula One designer. (Matra, Ligier, Alfa Romeo, Lotus, Larrousse)

Gérard Ducarouge (23 October 1941 – 19 February 2015) was a French Formula One car designer whose career in motorsport started in 1965 when he joined the French constructor and racing team Equipe Matra Sports. He designed the Matra MS80 car which, entered by the British privateer Matra International team of Ken Tyrrell, won both the World Drivers' Championship (for Jackie Stewart) and World Constructors' Championship in the 1969 season. After leaving Matra he also designed cars for Ligier and Lotus which won several races in the 1970s and 1980s.

== Biography ==
Like many designers, his background was in aeronautical engineering. He qualified at college with Bacalauréat Technique et Mathématique and won his Degre Superieur after studying at the École Nationale Technique d'Aéronautique.

After leaving college, he joined Nord Aviation in 1964, where he worked on various missile projects. However, he became restless and applied for a job as a technician at Matra racing in December 1965. This was shortly after the creation of Matra-Sports and Ducarouge started work on their Formula 3 programme, and from 1966 he also began improving their Formula 2 cars. He steadily rose within the organisation to head of operations, where he designed the Ford Cosworth DFV-powered Matra MS10 and Matra MS80 car, the latter winning the 1969 Formula One World Championship with Jackie Stewart. Ducarouge then designed the Matra MS670 car which won the 24 Hours of Le Mans in 1972, 1973, and 1974. It also delivered the World Championship for Makes to Matra in both 1973 and 1974 seasons. At the end of 1974, Matra pulled out of racing.

Ducarouge resigned shortly after to begin work at the new Formula One team founded by Guy Ligier at Vichy, close to Gerard's home town of Paray-le-Monial. He began work on Ligier's entrant to the 1976 season, the JS5 which retained links with Matra including their 3-litre V12 engine and SEITA Gitanes brand sponsorship. At the 1977 Swedish Grand Prix the team celebrated its maiden Grand Prix victory.

Subsequent victories were to occur throughout the 1979 season. In 1981 a revised Matra V12 was fitted in the latest Liger chassis and with Talbot backing it seemed as though the team would be contenders to win the constructors' championship. But by mid-season Ducarouge was unceremoniously sacked by Guy Ligier. He quickly accepted an offer to join the Alfa Romeo team where he persuaded the team to create his first carbon fibre chassis. Despite this and other innovations instigated by Ducarouge, Alfa Romeo failed to deliver on increasingly high expectations. Following the 1st qualifying session of the 1983 French Grand Prix where Andrea de Cesaris was disqualified for his car being underweight, Ducarouge was blamed and dismissed.

He was not to remain out of work for long, as Peter Warr from Team Lotus head hunted Ducarouge. Lotus had witnessed a severe decline in fortunes following their dominant 1978 campaign, and had culminated with the death of their founder Colin Chapman in December 1982. Following extensive persuasion Ducarouge joined the team following the 1983 Belgian Grand Prix. He immediately began work on the Type 94T which was designed and built in five weeks, and helped salvage some degree of success for the remainder of the 1983 season. Team Lotus began a major restructuring headed by Ducarouge and culminated with the years 1984–87 representing a major revival of the team's fortunes.

In 1984, Ducarouge's next Lotus, the 95T, was widely regarded as the finest handling chassis throughout the season with Elio de Angelis finishing third in the Drivers' Championship despite not winning a race, and teammate Nigel Mansell finishing tenth. Though de Angelis had a consistent season and finished in the points in the first 10 races of the season, he was a long way behind the dominant McLaren-TAGs of 1984 World Champion Niki Lauda and his teammate Alain Prost.

The still born Lotus 96T Indy Car incorporated the innovative use of lightweight aluminium foil honeycomb in the chassis replacing the previous nomex construction. The gain of strength with no weight penalty was to become a hallmark of subsequent Lotus Formula 1 chassis.

For the start of the 1985 season Ducarouge was joined at Lotus by Ayrton Senna. At the Portuguese Grand Prix held at a torrential Estoril, Senna would score his maiden win in a Ducarouge Lotus 97T. This was to be the first of seven wins for Ducarouge at Lotus and culminated in the 1987 victory in Detroit. His 1987 car, the Lotus 99T was the first Formula One car to be fitted with a computer-controlled active suspension system. Also, after four seasons of using the turbocharged Renault V6 engine, the 99T would use the powerful Honda V6 turbo. Senna, growing increasingly dissatisfied with Lotus' ability to build a championship contending car, would by the end of the season be unkindly referring to the 99T as nothing more than a 98T (the team's 1986 car) with a Honda engine instead of a Renault. The 99T was also visually more bulky than its competitors from Williams, Ferrari and McLaren.

Senna would depart for McLaren for the start of the 1988 season leaving Ducarouge to develop and enter the much hoped landmark Lotus 100T. Despite the 100T using the same specification turbocharged Honda V6 engines as McLaren, the team only finished in fourth position and Lotus failed to win a race for the first time since 1984 while McLaren would win a record 15 of the seasons 16 races, giving Ayrton Senna his first World Championship. The major faults of the 100T (driven in 1988 by reigning World Champion Nelson Piquet and Japanese driver Satoru Nakajima) were allegedly laid at incorrect aerodynamic data amassed during testing at Comtec, as well as the chassis being reported to be like "jelly on springs" and not rigid enough to handle the abrupt power delivery of Honda's 650 bhp (485 kW; 659 PS) engine.

Ducarouge departed Lotus to return to France and take up an offer from the Larrousse team. At Larrousse he developed the Lola chassis with Chris Murphy (who would later join Lotus for the 1992 season), though results were few and far between with Larrousse using the somewhat unreliable Lamborghini V12 engine. In 1991 he rejoined Ligier and remained as Technical Director until mid-1994.

In the twilight of his career, Ducarouge retraced his career path back to Matra where he worked as the International development director on various projects, including the development of the Renault Espace F1.

Ducarouge died on 19 February 2015 aged 73.
