= 1983 European Grand Prix =

- Race 14 of 15 in the 1983 Formula One World Championship

Race details
- Date: 25 September 1983
- Official name: John Player Grand Prix of Europe
- Location: Brands Hatch, Kent, England
- Course: Permanent racing facility
- Course length: 4.206 km (2.613 miles)
- Distance: 76 laps, 319.656 km (198.588 miles)
- Weather: Dry

Pole position
Driver	(Italy) Elio de Angelis	Lotus-Renault
- Time: 1:12.092

Fastest lap
Driver	(United Kingdom) Nigel Mansell	Lotus-Renault
- Time: 1:14.342 on lap 70

Podium
First	(Brazil) Nelson Piquet	Brabham-BMW
Second	(France) Alain Prost	Renault
Third	(United Kingdom) Nigel Mansell	Lotus-Renault

The 1983 European Grand Prix (formally the John Player Grand Prix of Europe) was a Formula One motor race held at Brands Hatch on 25 September 1983. It was the fourteenth race of the 1983 Formula One World Championship.

The 76-lap race was won by Nelson Piquet, driving a Brabham-BMW. Piquet's Drivers' Championship rival Alain Prost was second in a factory Renault, while Nigel Mansell was third in a Lotus-Renault. With the win, Piquet moved within two points of Prost at the top of the championship with one race remaining.

== Background ==
A third Grand Prix in the United States (after the earlier races at Long Beach and Detroit) was to have been held on this date, on a track at the Flushing Meadows–Corona Park in Queens, New York City, but was cancelled at short notice due to local protests. A second race in the United Kingdom, at Brands Hatch, was quickly organised in its place, and was the first Formula One race to be officially titled the European Grand Prix: this title had, until 1977, been an honorific title given to one race held in Europe each year alongside its official, national title. For eight of the entered drivers this was their second visit of the year to Brands Hatch as the circuit had hosted the non-championship Race of Champions (won by Keke Rosberg) on 10 April earlier that year.

== Qualifying ==
=== Qualifying report ===
Elio de Angelis surprised by taking pole position in his Lotus-Renault, with teammate Nigel Mansell third. Between them was the Brabham-BMW of Riccardo Patrese, with Nelson Piquet fourth in the other Brabham. The Ferraris filled the third row with René Arnoux ahead of Patrick Tambay, while the factory Renaults took up the fourth row, Eddie Cheever ahead of Drivers' Championship leader Alain Prost. Completing the top ten were Manfred Winkelhock in the ATS and John Watson in the McLaren.

The fastest non-turbo car was the Williams of Keke Rosberg in 16th; teammate Jacques Laffite failed to qualify. Williams had planned to debut their Honda turbo-powered FW09 at this race, but instead decided to wait until the season finale in South Africa. The team, did, however, enter a third car for test driver and Formula Two champion Jonathan Palmer, who qualified 25th.

=== Qualifying classification ===
Pos	No	Driver	Constructor	Q1	Q2	Gap
1	11	(Italy) Elio de Angelis	Lotus-Renault	1:12.342	1:12.092	—
2	6	(Italy) Riccardo Patrese	Brabham-BMW	1:13.475	1:12.458	+0.366
3	12	(United Kingdom) Nigel Mansell	Lotus-Renault	1:12.623	1:13.089	+0.531
4	5	(Brazil) Nelson Piquet	Brabham-BMW	1:12.724	1:13.095	+0.632
5	28	(France) René Arnoux	Ferrari	1:13.596	1:13.113	+1.021
6	27	(France) Patrick Tambay	Ferrari	1:13.898	1:13.157	+1.065
7	16	(United States) Eddie Cheever	Renault	1:13.592	1:13.253	+1.161
8	15	(France) Alain Prost	Renault	1:13.342	1:13.526	+1.250
9	9	(West Germany) Manfred Winkelhock	ATS-BMW	1:13.679	1:14.750	+1.587
10	7	(United Kingdom) John Watson	McLaren-TAG	1:14.296	1:13.783	+1.691
11	35	(United Kingdom) Derek Warwick	Toleman-Hart	1:14.411	1:13.855	+1.763
12	36	(Italy) Bruno Giacomelli	Toleman-Hart	1:15.521	1:13.949	+1.857
13	8	(Austria) Niki Lauda	McLaren-TAG	1:15.266	1:13.972	+1.880
14	22	(Italy) Andrea de Cesaris	Alfa Romeo	1:14.403	1:15.440	+2.311
15	23	(Italy) Mauro Baldi	Alfa Romeo	1:14.727	1:15.174	+2.635
16	1	(Finland) Keke Rosberg	Williams-Ford	1:14.917	1:15.252	+2.825
17	29	(Switzerland) Marc Surer	Arrows-Ford	1:15.346	1:15.501	+3.254
18	30	(Belgium) Thierry Boutsen	Arrows-Ford	1:16.094	1:15.428	+3.336
19	40	(Sweden) Stefan Johansson	Spirit-Honda	1:16.525	1:15.912	+3.820
20	4	(United States) Danny Sullivan	Tyrrell-Ford	1:17.134	1:16.640	+4.548
21	33	(Colombia) Roberto Guerrero	Theodore-Ford	1:16.769	1:17.454	+4.677
22	25	(France) Jean-Pierre Jarier	Ligier-Ford	1:17.141	1:16.880	+4.788
23	26	(Brazil) Raul Boesel	Ligier-Ford	1:17.177	1:17.593	+5.085
24	32	(Italy) Piercarlo Ghinzani	Osella-Alfa Romeo	1:17.850	1:17.408	+5.316
25	42	(United Kingdom) Jonathan Palmer	Williams-Ford	1:17.432	1:17.524	+5.340
26	3	(Italy) Michele Alboreto	Tyrrell-Ford	1:17.456	1:17.936	+5.364
27	17	(United Kingdom) Kenny Acheson	RAM-Ford	1:17.577	1:18.069	+5.485
28	31	(Italy) Corrado Fabi	Osella-Alfa Romeo	1:19.087	1:17.816	+5.724
29	2	(France) Jacques Laffite	Williams-Ford	1:18.467	1:18.261	+6.169
WD	34	(Venezuela) Johnny Cecotto	Theodore-Ford	—	—	—

== Race ==
=== Race report ===
At the start, Riccardo Patrese took the lead from Elio de Angelis, followed by Nigel Mansell, Nelson Piquet and Eddie Cheever. On lap 2 Piquet passed Mansell, who was having trouble with his tyres and would soon fall to seventh, while Alain Prost made a charge to run fourth by lap 9.

Patrese and de Angelis had pulled clear of the rest of the field when, on lap 11, de Angelis attempted to overtake the Brabham at Surtees Corner, only to make contact and send both cars spinning. Piquet duly went through into the lead, while Patrese rejoined the track ahead of Prost but was soon caught and passed by the Renault. De Angelis also rejoined, but continued for only two laps before retiring with an engine failure.

At quarter distance, Piquet led Prost by around 10 seconds, with Patrese a further 10 seconds back and holding up Cheever, René Arnoux, Mansell and Patrick Tambay. On lap 20 Arnoux spun at Surtees, dropping him to the back of the field. There were no further changes among the front-runners until the pit stops, during which both Brabhams hit trouble: Patrese was delayed by a misfitted rear wheel, while Piquet was held up by a malfunctioning wheel-nut gun. Piquet nonetheless retained his lead over Prost, while an unscheduled second stop for Cheever (due to a loose helmet visor which was taped by his pit crew) left Tambay in third and Mansell fourth, with Andrea de Cesaris up to fifth in the Alfa Romeo and Derek Warwick sixth in the Toleman.

In the closing stages, Tambay suffered brake problems, allowing Mansell past on lap 66 before spinning off at Druids two laps later. This moved the second Toleman of Bruno Giacomelli into the top six, while also ending Tambay's challenge for the Drivers' Championship. Shortly afterwards, Warwick had a bizarre accident when his cockpit fire extinguisher leaked, giving him burns to his right hand and leg, though he held on to fifth place.

Up front, Piquet cruised to his second consecutive win, finishing 6.5 seconds ahead of Prost with Mansell a further 24 seconds back. De Cesaris finished four seconds behind Mansell and ten ahead of Warwick, who in turn finished eight seconds ahead of teammate Giacomelli. Patrese ultimately finished seventh, while Arnoux was ninth and Cheever tenth, both one lap down on Piquet. With one race to go, Prost still led the Drivers' Championship but by only two points over Piquet, while Arnoux's failure to score left him needing to win in South Africa to have any chance of the title.

The race also saw the last appearance of the Theodore team, which was struggling financially and had scaled back to one car for Roberto Guerrero. Guerrero finished 12th, one place ahead of Palmer's Williams.

=== Race classification ===
Pos	No	Driver	Constructor	Tyre	Laps	Time/Retired	Grid	Points
1	5	(Brazil) Nelson Piquet	Brabham-BMW	M	76	1:36:45.865	4	9
2	15	(France) Alain Prost	Renault	M	76	+ 6.571	8	6
3	12	(United Kingdom) Nigel Mansell	Lotus-Renault	P	76	+ 30.315	3	4
4	22	(Italy) Andrea de Cesaris	Alfa Romeo	M	76	+ 34.396	14	3
5	35	(United Kingdom) Derek Warwick	Toleman-Hart	P	76	+ 44.915	11	2
6	36	(Italy) Bruno Giacomelli	Toleman-Hart	P	76	+ 52.190	12	1
7	6	(Italy) Riccardo Patrese	Brabham-BMW	M	76	+ 1:12.684	2	
8	9	(West Germany) Manfred Winkelhock	ATS-BMW	G	75	+ 1 Lap	9	
9	28	(France) René Arnoux	Ferrari	G	75	+ 1 Lap	5	
10	16	(United States) Eddie Cheever	Renault	M	75	+ 1 Lap	7	
11	30	(Belgium) Thierry Boutsen	Arrows-Ford	G	75	+ 1 Lap	18	
12	33	(Colombia) Roberto Guerrero	Theodore-Ford	G	75	+ 1 Lap	21	
13	42	(United Kingdom) Jonathan Palmer	Williams-Ford	G	74	+ 2 Laps	25	
14	40	(Sweden) Stefan Johansson	Spirit-Honda	G	74	+ 2 Laps	19	
15	26	(Brazil) Raul Boesel	Ligier-Ford	M	73	+ 3 Laps	23	
Ret	27	(France) Patrick Tambay	Ferrari	G	67	Spun off	6	
Ret	3	(Italy) Michele Alboreto	Tyrrell-Ford	G	64	Engine	26	
Ret	32	(Italy) Piercarlo Ghinzani	Osella-Alfa Romeo	M	63	Throttle	24	
Ret	29	(Switzerland) Marc Surer	Arrows-Ford	G	50	Engine	17	
Ret	1	(Finland) Keke Rosberg	Williams-Ford	G	43	Engine	16	
Ret	23	(Italy) Mauro Baldi	Alfa Romeo	M	39	Clutch	15	
Ret	7	(United Kingdom) John Watson	McLaren-TAG	M	36	Spun off	10	
Ret	4	(United States) Danny Sullivan	Tyrrell-Ford	G	27	Oil leak	20	
Ret	8	(Austria) Niki Lauda	McLaren-TAG	M	25	Engine	13	
Ret	11	(Italy) Elio de Angelis	Lotus-Renault	P	12	Oil pump	1	
Ret	25	(France) Jean-Pierre Jarier	Ligier-Ford	M	0	Clutch	22	
DNQ	17	(United Kingdom) Kenny Acheson	RAM-Ford	P				
DNQ	31	(Italy) Corrado Fabi	Osella-Alfa Romeo	M				
DNQ	2	(France) Jacques Laffite	Williams-Ford	G				

== Championship standings after the race ==
Drivers' Championship standings

Pos	Driver	Points
1	(France) Alain Prost	57
2	(Brazil) Nelson Piquet	55
3	(France) René Arnoux	49
4	(France) Patrick Tambay	40
5	(Finland) Keke Rosberg	25

Constructors' Championship standings

Pos	Constructor	Points
1	(Italy) Ferrari	89
2	(France) Renault	78
3	(United Kingdom) Brabham-BMW	59
4	(United Kingdom) Williams-Ford	36
5	(United Kingdom) McLaren-Ford	34

- Note: Only the top five positions are included for both sets of standings.

Previous race: 1983 Italian Grand Prix	FIA Formula One World Championship; 1983 season	Next race: 1983 South African Grand Prix
Previous race: 1977 British Grand Prix (designated European Grand Prix); Previous race at Brands Hatch: 1982 British Grand Prix	European Grand Prix	Next race: 1984 European Grand Prix; Next race at Brands Hatch: 1984 British Grand Prix
