= 1983 Brazilian Grand Prix =

- Race 1 of 15 in the 1983 Formula One World Championship
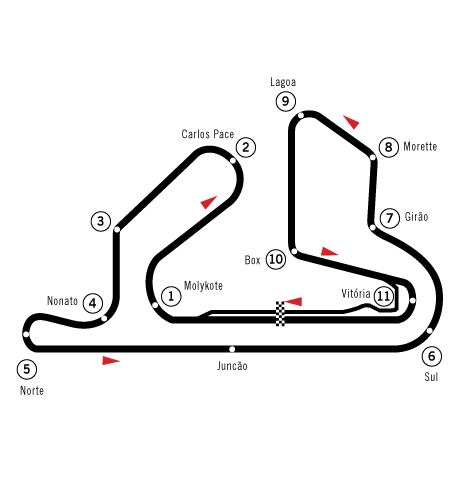

Race details
- Date: 13 March 1983
- Official name: XII Grande Prêmio do Brasil
- Location: Jacarepaguá Circuit; Jacarepaguá, Rio de Janeiro
- Course: Permanent racing facility
- Course length: 5.031 km (3.126 miles)
- Distance: 63 laps, 316.953 km (196.945 miles)
- Weather: Dry

Pole position
Driver	(Finland) Keke Rosberg	Williams-Ford
- Time: 1:34.526

Fastest lap
Driver	(Brazil) Nelson Piquet	Brabham-BMW
- Time: 1:39.829 on lap 4

Podium
First	(Brazil) Nelson Piquet	Brabham-BMW
Second	Not awarded	Not awarded
Third	(Austria) Niki Lauda	McLaren-Ford

The 1983 Brazilian Grand Prix was a Formula One motor race held at Jacarepaguá on 13 March 1983. It was the first race of the 1983 Formula One World Championship.

== Qualifying ==
Andrea de Cesaris in the first race for the new Alfa Romeo 890T V8 turbo engine, was excluded after failing to stop for a weight check during Saturday qualifying.

Keke Rosberg's pole position was the last for the Cosworth DFV engine, and the last for a car with a naturally aspirated engine until turbos were banned in 1989. It was also the last pole position for Cosworth until 1993.

== Race ==
The race marked the Formula One World Championship debut for American driver and future Indianapolis 500 winner Danny Sullivan, Italian driver Corrado Fabi, motorcycle road racing World Champion Johnny Cecotto, British constructor RAM.

Elio de Angelis qualified for the race in his Renault turbo-powered Lotus 93T, but switched to the team's spare car, a Cosworth DFV-powered Lotus 92, when the Renault unit failed on the warm-up lap. This was deemed illegal and so he was disqualified.

When the starting light turned green, the field made a clean start, with Alain Prost edging alongside Keke Rosberg into the first corner. Rosberg, however, retained the advantage under braking and established a clear lead as the cars accelerated onto the long back straight. At the hairpin, contact between Mauro Baldi (Alfa Romeo) and Michele Alboreto (Tyrrell) resulted in Alboreto spinning in the middle of the pack. Although a collision was avoided, the Tyrrell sustained oil-cooler damage and retired after seven laps, marking the first retirement of the 1983 season.

At the conclusion of the opening lap, Rosberg led by 2.5 seconds over Prost. The Brabham BT52 entries of Nelson Piquet and Riccardo Patrese occupied third and fourth respectively, followed by the Ferraris of Patrick Tambay and René Arnoux. Further back were Eddie Cheever (Renault), Derek Warwick (Toleman), Baldi, Niki Lauda, John Watson, Jean-Pierre Jarier and Roberto Guerrero. By lap two, Piquet had overtaken Prost for second, and within a further lap he reduced Rosberg's advantage significantly. On lap seven, Piquet passed Rosberg under braking to take the lead. Patrese moved up to challenge for second, while Prost began to lose ground in fourth.

Attention then shifted to the battle for the minor positions. Watson made rapid progress in his McLaren, overtaking Lauda and subsequently passing Baldi, Warwick and Cheever by lap seven. By lap 11 he had also passed both Ferraris and soon overtook Prost to claim third place by lap 17. Patrese, meanwhile, closed on Rosberg but experienced engine difficulties; by lap 18 he had dropped to ninth and soon retired with a broken exhaust that had reduced turbocharger pressure.

By lap 20 the order was Piquet, Rosberg, Watson, Prost, Tambay and Baldi. Baldi's defensive driving against Warwick culminated in a collision when Niki Lauda passed both; Baldi's Alfa Romeo rode over Warwick's Toleman, sustaining suspension damage. Baldi later retired and was subsequently disqualified for receiving a push-start.

Rosberg pitted on lap 28 for fuel and tyres. During the stop, fuel spilled onto the engine bay and ignited briefly, prompting Rosberg to exit the car before the fire was extinguished. The stop dropped him to ninth, one lap behind Piquet.

Rosberg was push-started from the pit lane and was thus disqualified post race. It was the second consecutive Brazilian Grand Prix in which Rosberg was disqualified from second place. For reasons unknown, FISA did not promote the drivers who finished behind Rosberg, so the six points for second place were officially not awarded.

Piquet made his own stop on lap 40. Despite the absence of an onboard air-jacking system on the BT52, the refuelling and tyre change were completed in just over 16 seconds, and he rejoined with a substantial lead. Rosberg, benefiting from fresh tyres, advanced steadily: he reached seventh by lap 34, fifth by lap 36 and fourth by lap 44. Prost retired on lap 46, and Rosberg overtook Lauda ten laps from the finish to secure second place on the road.

Piquet controlled the closing stages, reducing turbo boost to preserve the car and claiming victory — the first for the new Gordon Murray designed BT52 — having been disqualified from the previous year's event for a weight infringement with the BT49C. Rosberg, however, was later disqualified for the push-start. The final classification beyond second place remained provisional pending appeal.

Lauda finished third on the road, ahead of Jacques Laffite, who made significant progress in the latter stages. Tambay finished fifth, narrowly ahead of Marc Surer (Arrows). Prost, troubled by vibration, held off Warwick for seventh. Severe tyre vibration also affected Arnoux, allowing Chico Serra (Fittipaldi) to pass before the finish. The remaining classified finishers were Danny Sullivan (Tyrrell), Nigel Mansell (Lotus 92), Elio de Angelis (subsequently disqualified for changing car after the start procedure), Johnny Cecotto (Theodore), Eliseo Salazar (March) and Guerrero (Theodore).

== Classification ==
=== Qualifying ===
Pos	No	Driver	Constructor	Q1	Q2	Gap
1	1	(Finland) Keke Rosberg	Williams-Ford	1:34.526	1:35.226	—
2	15	(France) Alain Prost	Renault	1:34.672	1:34.873	+0.146
3	27	(France) Patrick Tambay	Ferrari	1:34.993	1:34.758	+0.232
4	5	(Brazil) Nelson Piquet	Brabham-BMW	1:35.815	1:35.114	+0.588
5	35	(United Kingdom) Derek Warwick	Toleman-Hart	1:35.206	16:44.720	+0.680
6	28	(France) René Arnoux	Ferrari	1:36.390	1:35.547	+1.021
7	6	(Italy) Riccardo Patrese	Brabham-BMW	1:35.958	1:36.827	+1.432
8	16	(United States) Eddie Cheever	Renault	1:37.005	1:36.051	+1.525
9	8	(Austria) Niki Lauda	McLaren-Ford	1:36.054	1:36.900	+1.528
10	23	(Italy) Mauro Baldi	Alfa Romeo	1:36.126	1:36.652	+1.600
11	3	(Italy) Michele Alboreto	Tyrrell-Ford	1:38.747	1:36.291	+1.765
12	25	(France) Jean-Pierre Jarier	Ligier-Ford	1:38.828	1:36.392	+1.866
13	11	(Italy) Elio de Angelis	Lotus-Renault	1:40.056	1:36.454	+1.928
14	33	(Colombia) Roberto Guerrero	Theodore-Ford	1:37.237	1:36.694	+2.168
15	36	(Italy) Bruno Giacomelli	Toleman-Hart	1:36.747	26:16.700	+2.221
16	7	(United Kingdom) John Watson	McLaren-Ford	1:37.844	1:36.977	+2.451
17	26	(Brazil) Raul Boesel	Ligier-Ford	1:38.741	1:37.729	+3.203
18	2	(France) Jacques Laffite	Williams-Ford	1:38.234	1:38.725	+3.708
19	34	(Venezuela) Johnny Cecotto	Theodore-Ford	1:38.378	1:39.178	+3.852
20	29	(Switzerland) Marc Surer	Arrows-Ford	1:40.255	1:38.488	+3.962
21	4	(United States) Danny Sullivan	Tyrrell-Ford	1:39.697	1:38.686	+4.160
22	12	(United Kingdom) Nigel Mansell	Lotus-Ford	1:42.098	1:39.154	+4.628
23	30	(Brazil) Chico Serra	Arrows-Ford	1:41.472	1:39.965	+5.439
24	31	(Italy) Corrado Fabi	Osella-Ford	1:41.316	1:40.309	+5.783
25	9	(West Germany) Manfred Winkelhock	ATS-BMW	1:42.292	1:41.153	+6.627
26	17	(Chile) Eliseo Salazar	RAM-Ford	1:44.357	1:41.478	+6.952
27	32	(Italy) Piercarlo Ghinzani	Osella-Ford	1:46.964	1:42.267	+7.741
EX†	22	(Italy) Andrea de Cesaris	Alfa Romeo	—	—	—

- † — time disallowed, driver excluded.

=== Race ===
Pos	No	Driver	Constructor	Tyre	Laps	Time/Retired	Grid	Points
1	5	(Brazil) Nelson Piquet	Brabham-BMW	MI	63	1:48:27.731	4	9
2	Not awarded (see above)							
3	8	(Austria) Niki Lauda	McLaren-Ford	MI	63	+ 51.883	9	4
4	2	(France) Jacques Laffite	Williams-Ford	G	63	+ 1:13.951	18	3
5	27	(France) Patrick Tambay	Ferrari	G	63	+ 1:18.117	3	2
6	29	(Switzerland) Marc Surer	Arrows-Ford	G	63	+ 1:18.207	20	1
7	15	(France) Alain Prost	Renault	MI	62	+ 1 Lap	2	
8	35	(United Kingdom) Derek Warwick	Toleman-Hart	P	62	+ 1 Lap	5	
9	30	(Brazil) Chico Serra	Arrows-Ford	G	62	+ 1 Lap	23	
10	28	(France) René Arnoux	Ferrari	G	62	+ 1 Lap	6	
11	4	(United States) Danny Sullivan	Tyrrell-Ford	G	62	+ 1 Lap	21	
12	12	(United Kingdom) Nigel Mansell	Lotus-Ford	P	61	+ 2 Laps	22	
13	34	(Venezuela) Johnny Cecotto	Theodore-Ford	G	60	+ 3 Laps	19	
14	17	(Chile) Eliseo Salazar	RAM-Ford	P	59	+ 4 Laps	26	
15	9	(West Germany) Manfred Winkelhock	ATS-BMW	G	59	+ 4 Laps	25	
DSQ	1	(Finland) Keke Rosberg	Williams-Ford	G	63	Push Start in Pits	1	
DSQ	11	(Italy) Elio de Angelis	Lotus-Ford	P	60	Illegal Car Change	13	
NC	33	(Colombia) Roberto Guerrero	Theodore-Ford	G	53	+ 10 Laps	14	
Ret	16	(United States) Eddie Cheever	Renault	MI	41	Brakes	8	
Ret	7	(United Kingdom) John Watson	McLaren-Ford	MI	34	Engine	16	
Ret	26	(Brazil) Raul Boesel	Ligier-Ford	MI	25	Engine	17	
Ret	23	(Italy) Mauro Baldi	Alfa Romeo	MI	23	Collision	10	
Ret	25	(France) Jean-Pierre Jarier	Ligier-Ford	MI	22	Suspension	12	
Ret	6	(Italy) Riccardo Patrese	Brabham-BMW	MI	19	Exhaust	7	
Ret	31	(Italy) Corrado Fabi	Osella-Ford	MI	17	Engine	24	
Ret	36	(Italy) Bruno Giacomelli	Toleman-Hart	P	16	Spun Off	15	
Ret	3	(Italy) Michele Alboreto	Tyrrell-Ford	G	7	Engine	11	
DNQ	32	(Italy) Piercarlo Ghinzani	Osella-Ford	MI				
EX	22	(Italy) Andrea de Cesaris	Alfa Romeo	MI		Missed Weight Check		

== Championship standings after the race ==
Drivers' Championship standings

Pos	Driver	Points
1	(Brazil) Nelson Piquet	9
2	(Austria) Niki Lauda	4
3	(France) Jacques Laffite	3
4	(France) Patrick Tambay	2
5	(Switzerland) Marc Surer	1

Constructors' Championship standings

Pos	Constructor	Points
1	(United Kingdom) Brabham-BMW	9
2	(United Kingdom) McLaren-Ford	4
3	(United Kingdom) Williams-Ford	3
4	(Italy) Ferrari	2
5	(United Kingdom) Arrows-Ford	1

- Note: Only the top five positions are included for both sets of standings.

Previous race: 1982 Caesars Palace Grand Prix	FIA Formula One World Championship; 1983 season	Next race: 1983 United States Grand Prix West
Previous race: 1982 Brazilian Grand Prix	Brazilian Grand Prix	Next race: 1984 Brazilian Grand Prix
