= 1983 South African Grand Prix =

- Race 15 of 15 in the 1983 Formula One World Championship
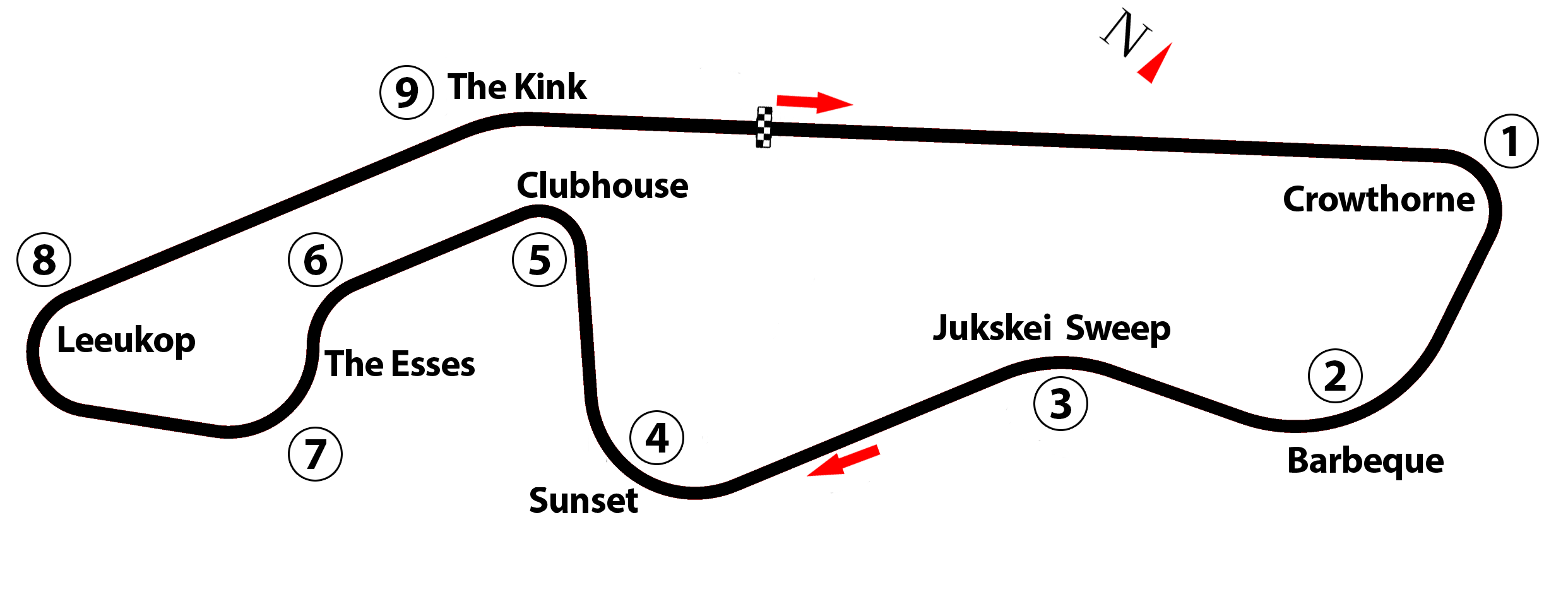

Race details
- Date: 15 October 1983
- Location: Kyalami; Transvaal Province, South Africa
- Course: Permanent racing facility
- Course length: 4.104 km (2.550 miles)
- Distance: 77 laps, 316.008 km (196.358 miles)
- Weather: Dry

Pole position
| Driver | (France) Patrick Tambay | Ferrari |
- Time: 1:06.554

Fastest lap
| Driver | (Brazil) Nelson Piquet | Brabham-BMW |
- Time: 1:09.948 on lap 6

Podium
| First | (Italy) Riccardo Patrese | Brabham-BMW |
| Second | (Italy) Andrea de Cesaris | Alfa Romeo |
| Third | (Brazil) Nelson Piquet | Brabham-BMW |

The 1983 South African Grand Prix was a Formula One motor race held at Kyalami on 15 October 1983. It was the fifteenth and final race of the 1983 Formula One season. The 77 lap race was won by Riccardo Patrese driving for Brabham. This would be Patrese's last win for nearly seven years until he won for Williams at the 1990 San Marino Grand Prix. This was also Williams' first race with the new Honda turbo engine.

He won ahead of Andrea de Cesaris and Nelson Piquet, with the latter scoring enough points to overtake Alain Prost in the standings to become world champion for the second time in his career by just two points. This was also the first title decider occurring in South Africa in 21 years.

== Background ==
=== Championship permutations ===
At the preceding 1983 European Grand Prix, runner-up Nelson Piquet outscored championship leader Alain Prost by three points after winning the race, meaning that three drivers were still in a position to win the World Drivers' Championship: Alain Prost (Renault) led the championship with 57 points, followed by Nelson Piquet (Brabham-BMW) with 55 and René Arnoux (Ferrari) with 49. It was the first time in two years that Formula One saw a three-way-fight for the title and the fourth consecutive season with the championship battle going down to the wire, with Piquet in his second title fight in three years after he became victorious two years prior and his subsequent underwhelming title defense at the infamous 1982 season. While both Prost and Arnoux had the opportunity to win their respective maiden title and to become France's first ever Formula One World Champion, Piquet would have equalized Emerson Fittipaldi's record of two world championship titles as Brazil's most successful driver by that metric, if he won the title. Piquet also would have become the second driver in succession after Keke Rosberg to win the Drivers' Championship by driving for a team that finished third or lower in the Constructors' Championship.

The championship would have been won by either of the top three drivers in the following manner:

| | Prost would have won if: | | |
| | (France) Alain Prost | (Brazil) Nelson Piquet | (France) René Arnoux |
|---|---|---|---|
| Pos. | 1st | Any position | Any position |
| Pos. | 2nd | 3rd or lower | Any position |
| Pos. | 3rd | 2nd or lower | Any position |
| Pos. | 4th or 5th | 3rd or lower | Any position |
| Pos. | 6th | 4th or lower | 2nd or lower |
| Pos. | lower than 6th | 5th or lower | 2nd or lower |

| | Piquet would have won if: | | |
| | (Brazil) Nelson Piquet | (France) Alain Prost | (France) René Arnoux |
|---|---|---|---|
| Pos. | 1st | Any position | Any position |
| Pos. | 2nd | 4th or lower | Any position |
| Pos. | 3rd | 6th or lower | Any position |
| Pos. | 4th | 7th or lower | 2nd or lower |

| | Arnoux would have won if: | | |
| | (France) René Arnoux | (France) Alain Prost | (Brazil) Nelson Piquet |
|---|---|---|---|
| Pos. | 1st | 6th or lower | 4th or lower |

- Ferrari and Renault were also fighting for the Constructor's Championship
  - Ferrari (89pts) needed either
    - To score 5pts or better
    - 4th, or 5th and 6th, or higher, with the Renaults 1st and 3rd or lower
    - 5th or better, with the Renaults 1st and 4th or lower
    - 6th or better, with the Renaults 1st and 5th or lower
    - The Renaults scoring fewer than 11pts
  - Renault (78pts) needed either
    - 1st and 2nd with the Ferraris scoring fewer than 5pts
    - 1st and 3rd with the Ferraris scoring fewer than 3pts
    - 1st and 4th with the Ferraris 6th or lower
    - 1st and 5th with the Ferraris 7th or lower.

=== Race summary ===
Piquet qualified second, behind Patrick Tambay (Ferrari) in pole position and ahead of Riccardo Patrese (Brabham), Arnoux and Prost in third, fourth and fifth. At the start Piquet passed Tambay to take the lead, with Patrese moving into second place. Arnoux retired with engine failure on lap 9. Prost fought his way up to third place, but he also retired on lap 35 with turbo failure. Needing only to finish fourth or higher, Piquet slowed and was overtaken by Patrese, Niki Lauda (McLaren) and Andrea de Cesaris (Alfa Romeo). Lauda's engine failed on lap 71. The race finished with Patrese in first place, de Cesaris in second and Piquet in third, and Piquet won the championship by two points. Ferrari won the Constructors' Championship despite not finishing in the points in the last race for the second consecutive year. John Watson, completing his last full Formula One season, was disqualified for overtaking other cars on the parade lap. This was also the last F1 race for Jean-Pierre Jarier.

== Classification ==
=== Qualifying ===
| Pos | No | Driver | Constructor | Q1 | Q2 | Gap |
|---|---|---|---|---|---|---|
| 1 | 27 | (France) Patrick Tambay | Ferrari | 1:06.554 | 1:07.029 | — |
| 2 | 5 | (Brazil) Nelson Piquet | Brabham-BMW | 1:06.792 | 1:06.821 | +0.238 |
| 3 | 6 | (Italy) Riccardo Patrese | Brabham-BMW | 1:08.181 | 1:07.001 | +0.447 |
| 4 | 28 | (France) René Arnoux | Ferrari | 1:07.222 | 1:07.105 | +0.551 |
| 5 | 15 | (France) Alain Prost | Renault | 1:07.186 | 1:08.136 | +0.632 |
| 6 | 1 | (Finland) Keke Rosberg | Williams-Honda | 1:07.256 | 1:07.344 | +0.702 |
| 7 | 12 | (United Kingdom) Nigel Mansell | Lotus-Renault | 1:09.443 | 1:07.643 | +1.089 |
| 8 | 9 | (West Germany) Manfred Winkelhock | ATS-BMW | 1:07.726 | 1:07.682 | +1.128 |
| 9 | 22 | (Italy) Andrea de Cesaris | Alfa Romeo | 1:08.970 | 1:07.759 | +1.205 |
| 10 | 2 | (France) Jacques Laffite | Williams-Honda | 1:07.931 | 1:08.652 | +1.377 |
| 11 | 11 | (Italy) Elio de Angelis | Lotus-Renault | 1:07.937 | 1:07.980 | +1.383 |
| 12 | 8 | (Austria) Niki Lauda | McLaren-TAG | 1:07.974 | 1:08.587 | +1.420 |
| 13 | 35 | (United Kingdom) Derek Warwick | Toleman-Hart | 1:08.061 | 1:08.301 | +1.507 |
| 14 | 16 | (United States) Eddie Cheever | Renault | 1:08.069 | 1:08.360 | +1.515 |
| 15 | 7 | (United Kingdom) John Watson | McLaren-TAG | 1:08.328 | 1:10.635 | +1.774 |
| 16 | 36 | (Italy) Bruno Giacomelli | Toleman-Hart | 1:08.350 | 1:08.439 | +1.796 |
| 17 | 23 | (Italy) Mauro Baldi | Alfa Romeo | 1:09.364 | 1:08.628 | +2.074 |
| 18 | 3 | (Italy) Michele Alboreto | Tyrrell-Ford | 1:11.096 | 1:11.284 | +4.542 |
| 19 | 4 | (United States) Danny Sullivan | Tyrrell-Ford | 1:11.750 | 1:11.382 | +4.828 |
| 20 | 30 | (Belgium) Thierry Boutsen | Arrows-Ford | 1:11.988 | 1:11.658 | +5.104 |
| 21 | 25 | (France) Jean-Pierre Jarier | Ligier-Ford | 1:12.017 | 1:12.538 | +5.463 |
| 22 | 29 | (Switzerland) Marc Surer | Arrows-Ford | 1:12.309 | 1:12.049 | +5.495 |
| 23 | 26 | (Brazil) Raul Boesel | Ligier-Ford | 1:12.745 | 1:13.330 | +6.191 |
| 24 | 17 | (United Kingdom) Kenny Acheson | RAM-Ford | 1:13.352 | no time | +6.798 |
| 25 | 31 | (Italy) Corrado Fabi | Osella-Alfa Romeo | 1:14.483 | 1:13.656 | +7.102 |
| 26 | 32 | (Italy) Piercarlo Ghinzani | Osella-Alfa Romeo | 1:14.903 | 1:15.503 | +8.349 |

=== Race ===
| Pos | No | Driver | Constructor | Tyre | Laps | Time/Retired | Grid | Points |
|---|---|---|---|---|---|---|---|---|
| 1 | 6 | (Italy) Riccardo Patrese | Brabham-BMW | MI | 77 | 1:33:25.708 | 3 | 9 |
| 2 | 22 | (Italy) Andrea de Cesaris | Alfa Romeo | MI | 77 | + 9.319 | 9 | 6 |
| 3 | 5 | (Brazil) Nelson Piquet | Brabham-BMW | MI | 77 | + 21.969 | 2 | 4 |
| 4 | 35 | (United Kingdom) Derek Warwick | Toleman-Hart | P | 76 | + 1 Lap | 13 | 3 |
| 5 | 1 | (Finland) Keke Rosberg | Williams-Honda | G | 76 | + 1 Lap | 6 | 2 |
| 6 | 16 | (United States) Eddie Cheever | Renault | MI | 76 | + 1 Lap | 14 | 1 |
| 7 | 4 | (United States) Danny Sullivan | Tyrrell-Ford | G | 75 | + 2 Laps | 19 | |
| 8 | 29 | (Switzerland) Marc Surer | Arrows-Ford | G | 75 | + 2 Laps | 22 | |
| 9 | 30 | (Belgium) Thierry Boutsen | Arrows-Ford | G | 74 | + 3 Laps | 20 | |
| 10 | 25 | (France) Jean-Pierre Jarier | Ligier-Ford | MI | 73 | + 4 Laps | 21 | |
| 11 | 8 | (Austria) Niki Lauda | McLaren-TAG | MI | 71 | Electrical | 12 | |
| 12 | 17 | (United Kingdom) Kenny Acheson | RAM-Ford | P | 71 | + 6 Laps | 24 | |
| NC | 12 | (United Kingdom) Nigel Mansell | Lotus-Renault | P | 68 | + 9 Laps | 7 | |
| NC | 26 | (Brazil) Raul Boesel | Ligier-Ford | MI | 66 | + 11 Laps | 23 | |
| Ret | 3 | (Italy) Michele Alboreto | Tyrrell-Ford | G | 60 | Engine | 18 | |
| Ret | 27 | (France) Patrick Tambay | Ferrari | G | 56 | Turbo | 1 | |
| Ret | 36 | (Italy) Bruno Giacomelli | Toleman-Hart | P | 56 | Turbo | 16 | |
| Ret | 15 | (France) Alain Prost | Renault | MI | 35 | Turbo | 5 | |
| Ret | 31 | (Italy) Corrado Fabi | Osella-Alfa Romeo | MI | 28 | Engine | 25 | |
| Ret | 11 | (Italy) Elio de Angelis | Lotus-Renault | P | 20 | Engine | 11 | |
| DSQ | 7 | (United Kingdom) John Watson | McLaren-TAG | MI | 18 | Overtaking on Formation Lap | 15 | |
| Ret | 28 | (France) René Arnoux | Ferrari | G | 9 | Engine | 4 | |
| Ret | 23 | (Italy) Mauro Baldi | Alfa Romeo | MI | 5 | Engine | 17 | |
| Ret | 9 | (West Germany) Manfred Winkelhock | ATS-BMW | G | 1 | Engine | 8 | |
| Ret | 2 | (France) Jacques Laffite | Williams-Honda | G | 1 | Spun Off | 10 | |
| Ret | 32 | (Italy) Piercarlo Ghinzani | Osella-Alfa Romeo | MI | 1 | Engine | 26 | |

== Championship standings after the race ==
- **Bold text** indicates the World Champions.

Drivers' Championship standings

| Pos | Driver | Points |
|---|---|---|
| 1 | (Brazil) **Nelson Piquet** | 59 |
| 2 | (France) Alain Prost | 57 |
| 3 | (France) René Arnoux | 49 |
| 4 | (France) Patrick Tambay | 40 |
| 5 | (Finland) Keke Rosberg | 27 |

Constructors' Championship standings

| Pos | Constructor | Points |
|---|---|---|
| 1 | (Italy) **Ferrari** | 89 |
| 2 | (France) Renault | 79 |
| 3 | (United Kingdom) Brabham-BMW | 72 |
| 4 | (United Kingdom) Williams-Ford | 36 |
| 5 | (United Kingdom) McLaren-Ford | 34 |

- Note: Only the top five positions are included for both sets of standings.

| Previous race: 1983 European Grand Prix | FIA Formula One World Championship; 1983 season | Next race: 1984 Brazilian Grand Prix |
| Previous race: 1982 South African Grand Prix | South African Grand Prix | Next race: 1984 South African Grand Prix |
