= 1983 United States Grand Prix West =

Formula One race

- Race 2 of 15 in the 1983 Formula One World Championship
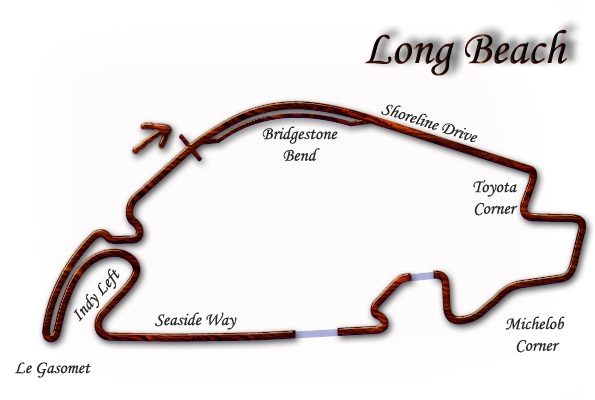

Race details
- Date: March 27, 1983
- Official name: Toyota Grand Prix of Long Beach
- Location: Long Beach Street Circuit
- Course: Temporary street course
- Course length: 3.275 km (2.034 miles)
- Distance: 75 laps, 245.625 km (152.55 miles)
- Weather: Sunny and warm with temperatures reaching up to 65.8 °F (18.8 °C); wind speeds approaching speeds up to 9.9 miles per hour (15.9 km/h)

Pole position
Driver	(France) Patrick Tambay	Ferrari
- Time: 1:26.117

Fastest lap
Driver	(Austria) Niki Lauda	McLaren-Ford
- Time: 1:28.330 on lap 42

Podium
First	(United Kingdom) John Watson	McLaren-Ford
Second	(Austria) Niki Lauda	McLaren-Ford
Third	(France) René Arnoux	Ferrari

The 1983 United States Grand Prix West (officially the Toyota Grand Prix of Long Beach) was a Formula One motor race held on March 27, 1983 at Long Beach Street Circuit. It was the second race of the 1983 Formula One World Championship.

The 75-lap race was won by Northern Irishman John Watson, driving a McLaren-Ford. Watson took his fifth and final F1 victory having started from 22nd position, the lowest from which a driver has won an F1 race. Austrian teammate Niki Lauda finished second, having himself started 23rd, with Frenchman René Arnoux third in a Ferrari. It was also the last win for a Northern Irish driver until Eddie Irvine at the 1999 Australian Grand Prix.

This was the final running of the Long Beach race as an F1 event, before organizer Chris Pook switched to the CART IndyCar series.

== Qualifying ==
=== Qualifying report ===
Once again, the Long Beach circuit had been slightly modified, primarily to free up Ocean Boulevard, one of the city's main thoroughfares. Since the alternate route on Seaside Way included a tunnel under the Long Beach convention center, the pits were moved to the long, curving Shoreline Drive section, where the start and finish lines were reunited for the first time since 1977.

As practice began on Friday, two bumps where the circuit rejoined the old layout at the end of the Seaside Way straight were causing problems. Some teams were concerned that the suspension on their cars would not last more than a few laps under race conditions. René Arnoux (Ferrari) was the first to go over the bumps flat out and his 1:26.935 led Alain Prost (Renault), Patrick Tambay (Ferrari) and Riccardo Patrese (Brabham) on the day's timing chart, while Nelson Piquet (Brabham), Lauda and Watson found their Michelin qualifying tires virtually useless and set poor times.

Overnight repair work smoothed the problematic bumps. Tambay grabbed his first pole with a lap of 1:26.117, the only lap to beat teammate Arnoux's Friday time; Keke Rosberg (Williams) took third with 1:27.145, ahead of teammate Jacques Laffite. American Danny Sullivan (Tyrrell), in his only season of Formula One, managed ninth, while the other American in F1, Eddie Cheever (driving the older model Renault RE30C) was 15th, 7 places behind team mate Prost in the newer RE40 model. The McLarens of Watson and Lauda were never able to arrive at a balanced setup, and they would start in 22nd and 23rd position.

Making what would be an abortive comeback to Formula One, Australia's 1980 World Champion Alan Jones took Chico Serra's drive in the No.30 Arrows-Ford. Still recovering from a broken hip requiring a pin, the result of falling off a horse on his farm north of Melbourne, Jones qualified in a creditable 12th place for his first F1 GP since winning the final race of the 1981 season at Caesars Palace in Las Vegas.

=== Qualifying classification ===
Pos	No	Driver	Constructor	Q1	Q2	Gap
1	27	(France) Patrick Tambay	Ferrari	1:28.598	1:26.117	
2	28	(France) René Arnoux	Ferrari	1:26.935	1:27.628	+0.818
3	1	(Finland) Keke Rosberg	Williams-Ford	1:29.577	1:27.145	+1.028
4	2	(France) Jacques Laffite	Williams-Ford	1:30.529	1:27.818	+1.701
5	11	(Italy) Elio de Angelis	Lotus-Renault	1:31.624	1:27.982	+1.865
6	35	(United Kingdom) Derek Warwick	Toleman-Hart	no time	1:28.130	+2.013
7	3	(Italy) Michele Alboreto	Tyrrell-Ford	1:29.066	1:28.425	+2.308
8	15	(France) Alain Prost	Renault	1:28.558	1:29.765	+2.441
9	4	(United States) Danny Sullivan	Tyrrell-Ford	1:31.271	1:28.833	+2.716
10	25	(France) Jean-Pierre Jarier	Ligier-Ford	1:29.600	1:28.913	+2.796
11	6	(Italy) Riccardo Patrese	Brabham-BMW	1:28.958	1:29.467	+2.841
12	30	(Australia) Alan Jones	Arrows-Ford	1:30.451	1:29.112	+2.995
13	12	(United Kingdom) Nigel Mansell	Lotus-Ford	1:31.728	1:29.167	+3.050
14	36	(Italy) Bruno Giacomelli	Toleman-Hart	no time	1:29.266	+3.149
15	16	(United States) Eddie Cheever	Renault	1:30.597	1:29.422	+3.305
16	29	(Switzerland) Marc Surer	Arrows-Ford	1:30.067	1:29.521	+3.404
17	34	(Venezuela) Johnny Cecotto	Theodore-Ford	1:29.559	1:30.258	+3.442
18	33	(Colombia) Roberto Guerrero	Theodore-Ford	1:29.585	1:28.528†	+3.468
19	22	(Italy) Andrea de Cesaris	Alfa Romeo	1:33.336	1:29.603	+3.486
20	5	(Brazil) Nelson Piquet	Brabham-BMW	1:30.173	1:30.034	+3.917
21	23	(Italy) Mauro Baldi	Alfa Romeo	1:31.924	1:30.070	+3.953
22	7	(United Kingdom) John Watson	McLaren-Ford	1:32.439	1:30.100	+3.983
23	8	(Austria) Niki Lauda	McLaren-Ford	1:30.262	1:30.188	+4.071
24	9	(West Germany) Manfred Winkelhock	ATS-BMW	1:31.599	1:30.220	+4.103
25	17	(Chile) Eliseo Salazar	RAM-Ford	1:32.597	1:31.126	+5.009
26	26	(Brazil) Raul Boesel	Ligier-Ford	1:31.759	1:31.765	+6.642
27	31	(Italy) Corrado Fabi	Osella-Ford	1:33.896	1:31.901	+6.784
28	32	(Italy) Piercarlo Ghinzani	Osella-Ford	no time	1:32.182	+7.065

- † — time disallowed

== Race ==
=== Race report ===
The race took place in warm and sunny conditions and marked the 300th Grand Prix start for Lotus. Tambay held the lead at the first corner. Rosberg, immediately behind him, tried to squeeze through the middle of the all-Ferrari front row. He touched Arnoux's right front with his left rear as he swung wide, but both continued, with Rosberg in second, followed by Laffite and Arnoux. Rosberg spun later in the lap while attempting to overtake, but continued without damage.

After one lap, Sullivan was up to sixth, behind Arnoux, and Cheever was ninth, immediately behind Prost. Sullivan was passed by Patrese on the second lap, and then by Prost and Cheever on lap three. Before long, however, Prost began dropping back with a misfire that had been plaguing him recurrently all weekend, and he finally pitted on lap 16. Cheever was able to get by Arnoux and Patrese when Arnoux began to lose grip from his Goodyears, and was up into fifth place. When Cheever entered the Renault pit for a new set of tires, however, he found the crew still working on Prost's car; he was forced to continue. Prost's problem was eventually solved and he continued, albeit three laps down.

Meanwhile, Rosberg had regained second place behind Tambay and, by lap 20, was again looking for a way by. The top six cars were all running very close together, and Rosberg soon found himself under increasing pressure from Laffite, who was in turn being hounded by Jean-Pierre Jarier's Ligier and Patrese's Brabham.

On lap 26, Rosberg attempted to take the lead again, but collided with Tambay, who spun and stalled. Rosberg continued again, driving around the outside of the disabled car. As he entered the chicane before the start/finish line, he found his teammate Laffite alongside and Jarier almost touching his gearbox behind. The two Williams cars touched briefly, and Jarier ran into the back of Rosberg, who hit the wall, bounced off, and hit it again before sliding to a stop. Jarier continued, but only briefly, as a damaged front wing had spoiled his handling, and he retired in the pits.

Laffite was now in the lead, with Patrese in second. By lap 28, the McLarens were lying third and fourth, having passed Marc Surer, Sullivan and Johnny Cecotto. When Watson got by Lauda at the end of Shoreline Drive, he was 20 seconds behind the two leaders. With Watson closing the gap to the front and Laffite's tires going off quickly, Patrese challenged Laffite for the lead. He slid wide, and Watson and Lauda both passed before he rejoined the track. Soon after, the McLarens passed Laffite as well, and, from 22nd and 23rd on the grid, were now first and second.

With Laffite still struggling with his tires, Patrese was able to catch him up again and took third on lap 52. Arnoux was coming back through the field after a second tire stop, and was waging battle with Cheever for fifth place when they came upon Laffite on lap 67, again at the end of Shoreline Drive. At the hairpin, the Williams and Ferrari swapped places around Cheever, as Arnoux went from sixth to fourth in one corner. On the next lap, however, Cheever lost fifth place when he pulled off with a broken gearbox. With just three laps to go, Patrese retired from third place when his distributor broke.

Semi-retired 1980 World Champion, Australian Alan Jones replaced regular Arrows driver Chico Serra for the race in what was to prove to be a short-lived comeback to Formula One. After qualifying a credible 12th on the grid in the Cosworth powered Arrows A6, Jones ran in the top 10 until retiring on lap 58 with fatigue. Jones, who had only raced at home in Australia since retiring from F1 following the 1981 season, was still suffering the effects of a fall from a horse on his farm a couple of months earlier where he had broken his hip.

Lauda, suffering from a worsening cramp in his right leg, could not challenge Watson in the later stages, and the Ulsterman came home nearly half a minute ahead for his fifth victory. It was the farthest back from which a modern Grand Prix driver had ever come to win a race, and As of 2024, it remains the only time in F1 history a driver has won who qualified 20th or worst. Arnoux came through for third, and Laffite hung on for fourth, ahead of Surer and Cecotto, who scored a point in his second F1 race. It was the first ever points for a Venezuelan driver, and the last until Pastor Maldonado finished tenth in the 2011 Belgian Grand Prix.

Rumors persisted all weekend that race organizer Chris Pook, the main figure in the attempt to create a "Monte Carlo of the United States" in Long Beach, had decided that Formula One was too expensive and risky, and, indeed, after the race, he announced that he planned to run a CART race at Long Beach in 1984 instead of F1. Despite tremendous success since the race's inception in 1976, and the observable impact of the global exposure it brought to the city and to the Los Angeles area in general, the organizers believed that the less expensive and more popular (in the United States at least) CART championship, dominated by American drivers, would be a more promising investment.

=== Race classification ===
Pos	No	Driver	Constructor	Tyre	Laps	Time/Retired	Grid	Points
1	7	(United Kingdom) John Watson	McLaren-Ford	MI	75	1:53:34.889	22	9
2	8	(Austria) Niki Lauda	McLaren-Ford	MI	75	+ 27.993	23	6
3	28	(France) René Arnoux	Ferrari	G	75	+ 1:13.638	2	4
4	2	(France) Jacques Laffite	Williams-Ford	G	74	+ 1 Lap	4	3
5	29	(Switzerland) Marc Surer	Arrows-Ford	G	74	+ 1 Lap	16	2
6	34	(Venezuela) Johnny Cecotto	Theodore-Ford	G	74	+ 1 Lap	17	1
7	26	(Brazil) Raul Boesel	Ligier-Ford	MI	73	+ 2 Laps	26	
8	4	(United States) Danny Sullivan	Tyrrell-Ford	G	73	+ 2 Laps	9	
9	3	(Italy) Michele Alboreto	Tyrrell-Ford	G	73	+ 2 Laps	7	
10	6	(Italy) Riccardo Patrese	Brabham-BMW	MI	72	Distributor	11	
11	15	(France) Alain Prost	Renault	MI	72	+ 3 Laps	8	
12	12	(United Kingdom) Nigel Mansell	Lotus-Ford	P	72	+ 3 Laps	13	
13	16	(United States) Eddie Cheever	Renault	MI	67	Gearbox	15	
Ret	30	(Australia) Alan Jones	Arrows-Ford	G	58	Driver unwell	12	
Ret	5	(Brazil) Nelson Piquet	Brabham-BMW	MI	51	Throttle	20	
Ret	22	(Italy) Andrea de Cesaris	Alfa Romeo	MI	48	Gearbox	19	
Ret	11	(Italy) Elio de Angelis	Lotus-Renault	P	29	Handling	5	
Ret	33	(Colombia) Roberto Guerrero	Theodore-Ford	G	27	Gearbox	18	
Ret	25	(France) Jean-Pierre Jarier	Ligier-Ford	MI	26	Collision	10	
Ret	36	(Italy) Bruno Giacomelli	Toleman-Hart	P	26	Battery	14	
Ret	23	(Italy) Mauro Baldi	Alfa Romeo	MI	26	Spun off	21	
Ret	27	(France) Patrick Tambay	Ferrari	G	25	Collision	1	
Ret	1	(Finland) Keke Rosberg	Williams-Ford	G	25	Collision	3	
Ret	17	(Chile) Eliseo Salazar	RAM-Ford	P	25	Gearbox	25	
Ret	35	(United Kingdom) Derek Warwick	Toleman-Hart	P	11	Spun off	6	
Ret	9	(West Germany) Manfred Winkelhock	ATS-BMW	G	3	Spun off	24	
DNQ	31	(Italy) Corrado Fabi	Osella-Ford	MI				
DNQ	32	(Italy) Piercarlo Ghinzani	Osella-Ford	MI				

== Championship standings after the race ==
Drivers' Championship standings

Pos	Driver	Points
1	(Austria) Niki Lauda	10
2	(Brazil) Nelson Piquet	9
3	(United Kingdom) John Watson	9
4	(France) Jacques Laffite	6
5	(France) René Arnoux	4

Constructors' Championship standings

Pos	Constructor	Points
1	(United Kingdom) McLaren-Ford	19
2	(United Kingdom) Brabham-BMW	9
3	(Italy) Ferrari	6
4	(United Kingdom) Williams-Ford	6
5	(United Kingdom) Arrows-Ford	3

- Note: Only the top five positions are included for both sets of standings.

Previous race: 1983 Brazilian Grand Prix	FIA Formula One World Championship; 1983 season	Next race: 1983 French Grand Prix
Previous race: 1982 United States Grand Prix West	United States Grand Prix West	Next race: N/A

Preceded by 1982 United States Grand Prix West	Grand Prix of Long Beach	Succeeded by 1984 Long Beach Grand Prix
