= McLaren MP4/1 =

McLaren team's Formula One racing car

McLaren MP4 McLaren MP4B McLaren MP4/1C McLaren MP4/1E
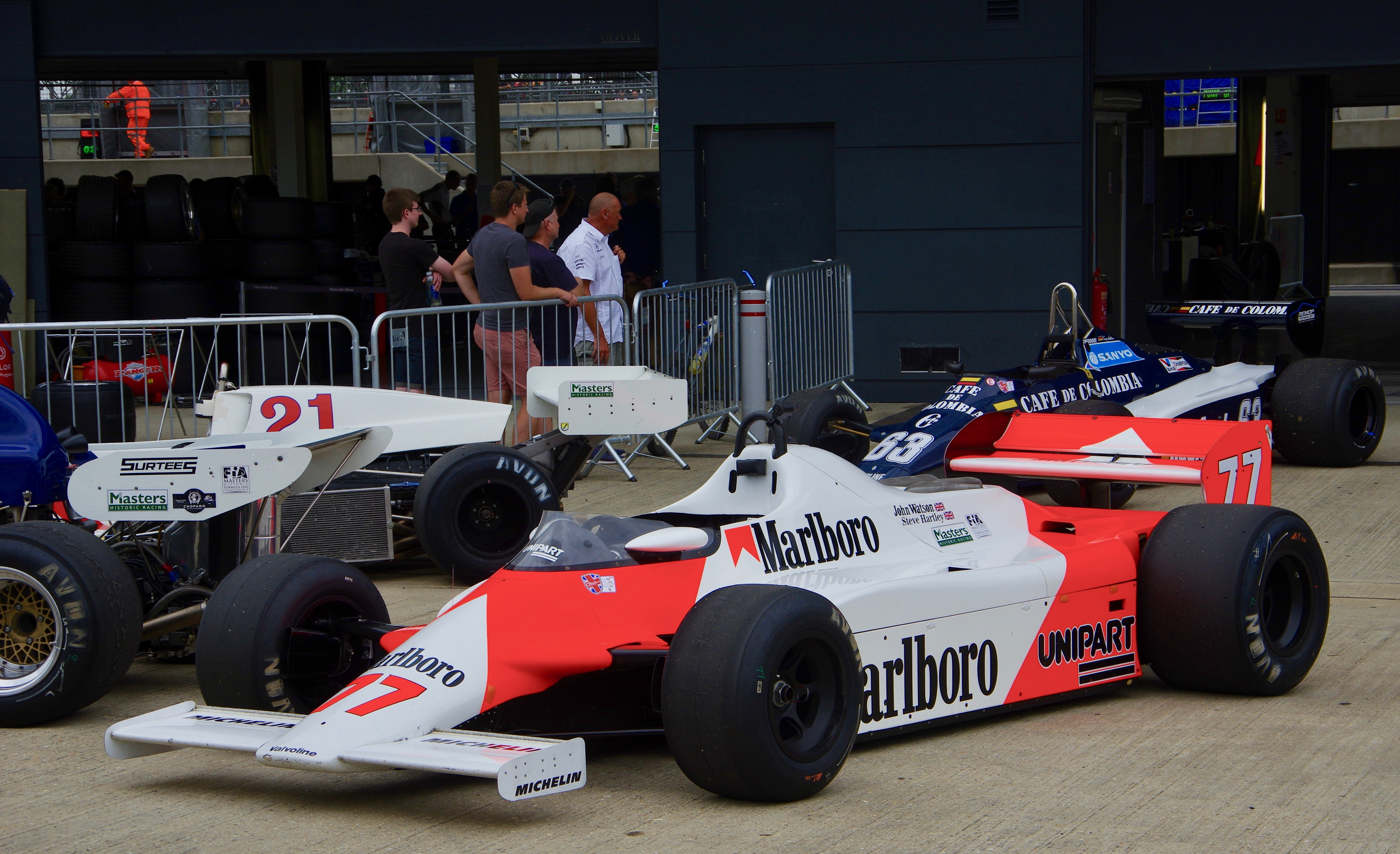
- McLaren MP4 (MP4/1), competed in the 1981 Formula One season
- Category: Formula One
- Constructor: McLaren
- Designers: John Barnard (Technical Director, Chief Designer); Alan Jenkins (Chief Engineer); John Baldwin (Design Office Engineer); Mike Lock (Design Office Engineer); Collin Smith (Design Office Engineer); Steve Nichols (Design Office Engineer)
- Predecessor: M30
- Successor: MP4/2

Technical specifications
- Chassis: Carbon fibre monocoque
- Engine: 1981-1983: mid-engine, longitudinally mounted, Ford-Cosworth DFV, 2,993 cc (182.6 cu in), NA, 90° V8; 1983: mid-engine, longitudinally mounted, TAG-Porsche TTE PO1, 1,499 cc (91.5 cu in), turbo, 90° V6,
- Transmission: McLaren / Hewland FGA 400 5-speed manual
- Power: 510 hp (380.3 kW) @ 11,000 rpm (Cosworth DFY V8), 700 hp (522.0 kW) @ 11,500 rpm (TAG-Porsche V6 turbo)
- Tyres: Michelin

Competition history
- Notable entrants: Marlboro McLaren International
- Notable drivers: 7. (United Kingdom) John Watson; 8. (Italy) Andrea de Cesaris; 8. (Austria) Niki Lauda
- Debut: 1981 Monaco Grand Prix
Races	Wins	Poles	F/Laps
43	6	0	5
- Unless otherwise stated, all data refer to Formula One World Championship Grands Prix only.

The McLaren MP4/1 (initially known as the MP4) was a Formula One racing car produced by the McLaren team. It debuted at round three of the 1981 season, the Argentine Grand Prix, and saw continued use in 1982 and 1983. It was one of the first Formula One cars to use a monocoque chassis wholly manufactured from carbon fibre composite, a concept which is now ubiquitous. Whilst the Lotus 88 was the first Formula One car to debut with a composite chassis at the US Grand Prix West at Long Beach that was the opener for the 1981 season, it was banned during that race weekend, so the MP4/1 was the first to actually race with a composite chassis. The chassis was designed by John Barnard, Steve Nichols and Alan Jenkins. The car was initially powered by a Ford-Cosworth DFV engine, which was the standard in Formula One at the time.

== Background and name ==
Formula One teams had been using carbon-fibre reinforced polymer to build auto parts since 1975, when a carbon fibre rear wing was added to Graham Hill's Embassy. As teams optimised the ground effect cars in vogue at the time, teams began to realise that aluminium, the industry-standard building material at the time, was not stiff enough to handle the degree of downforce exerted on the very best cars. Carbon fibre was both lighter and stiffer than aluminium. After watching Rolls-Royce engineers use carbon fibre to build the Rolls-Royce RB211 turbofan engine, chassis designer John Barnard began drawing up plans for a complete carbon fibre car.

Barnard saw the potential of this technology and persuaded Ron Dennis, the team principal of Formula Two's Project Four Racing, of its viability. However, they were unable to find a Formula One team to implement their idea. Team Lotus was simultaneously working on a carbon fibre car that also debuted in 1981, although the Lotus 88 was banned before its first race because of its controversial dual-chassis structure.

Fortunately for Dennis and Barnard, McLaren Racing (whose drivers had won the 1974 and 1976 Drivers' Championships) was looking for new leadership. The team's performances had declined towards the end of the 1970s, prompting its lead sponsor, Marlboro's John Hogan, to demand changes in the organisation. Hogan knew Dennis from the latter's years at Rondel Racing and agreed to fund the development of the carbon fibre chassis.

The name of the car, MP4, was short for either Marlboro Project Four or McLaren Project Four, depending on who was asked. It was considered "the most advanced and expensive race car in the world".

== Design and construction ==
The chassis was built by McLaren using carbon supplied by American firm Hercules Aerospace in Salt Lake City on the advice of McLaren engineer and former Hercules apprentice Steve Nichols, and quickly revolutionised car design in Formula One with new levels of rigidity and driver protection and its Carbon-Fibre-Composite (CFC) construction. Dennis and Barnard took Nichols' advice after being rejected by multiple British firms due to the ambitiousness of this method of chassis construction. The first few MP4/1 chassis were built in America and sent back to the McLaren factory as they did not have autoclaves at the time.

The car was far more advanced than any of McLaren's previous cars, including its immediate predecessors, the M29 and M30. Its design and construction were of a far more precise nature than before, just about at the level of fighter aircraft. Within months and subsequent years, carbon fibre started being used by all of McLaren's rivals.

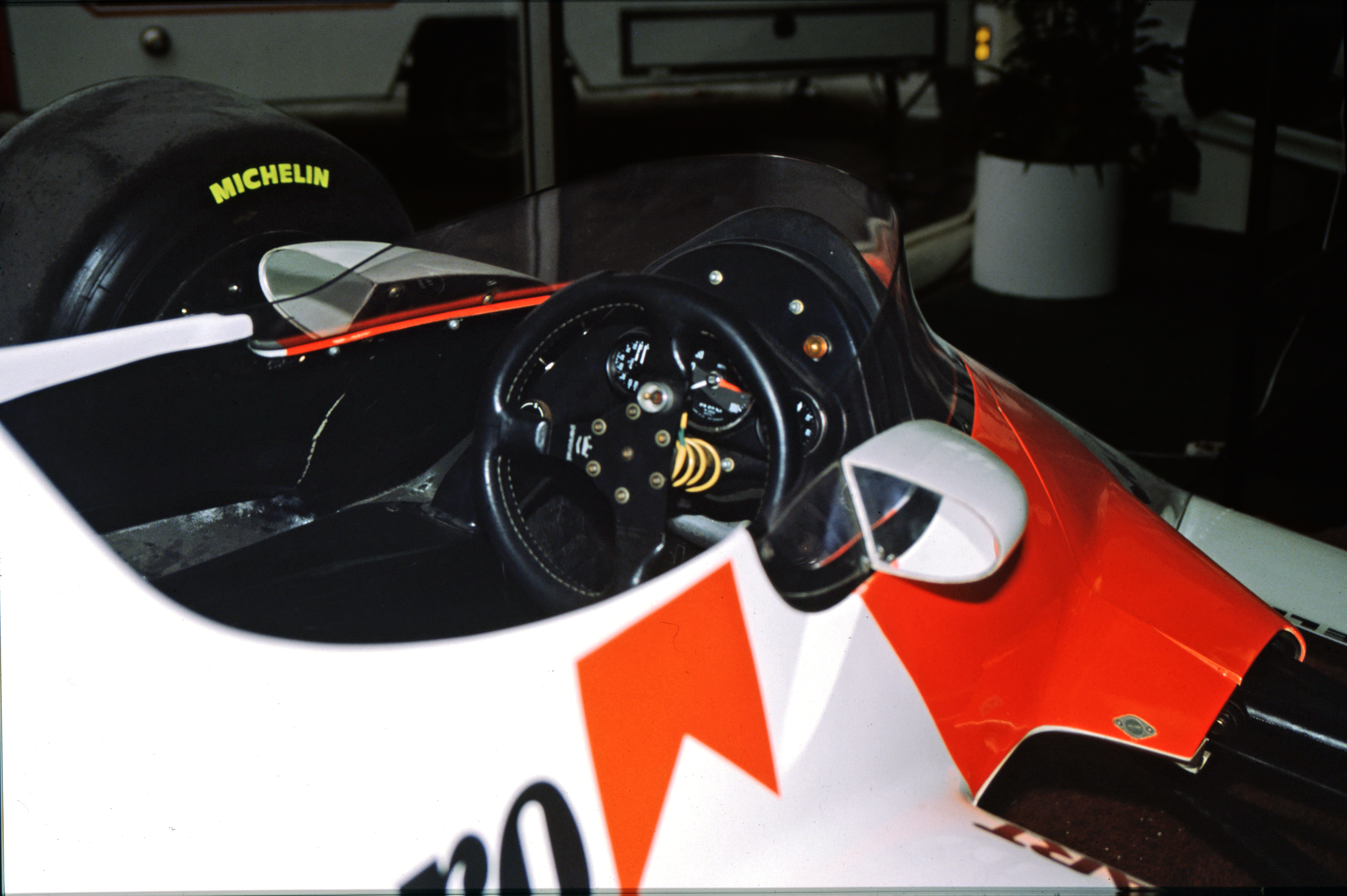
The cockpit of the MP4B

From 1981 until late 1983 the MP4/1 was powered by the 3.0 litre Ford-Cosworth DFV V8 engine, but in late 1983 the team switched to turbocharging, using a 1.5 litre TAG V6 engine built by Porsche.

In both 1981 and 1982, McLaren International benefited from the exclusive use of a developed Nicholson-McLaren Cosworth DFV which powered the MP4. Developed and re-built in John Nicholson's Colnbrook workshops (an agreement with McLaren going back to the mid-1970s) the Nicholson DFV featured bigger pistons and valves than a conventional factory DFV, and thus could rev to around 11,500 RPM, producing around 510 BHP, enabling John Watson and Niki Lauda to all but match the factory Ferrari and Renault V6 twin-turbos in straight line speed during the 1982 season. The Nicholson DFV also used different castings to reduce frictional losses, as well as using MAHLE pistons rather than Cosworth's in house piston/con rods.

Hercules Aerospace keeps John Watson's car which was destroyed in the 1981 Italian Grand Prix and shows it off to visitors after allowing them to view footage of the accident, highlighting how it was possible for him to survive in a carbon fibre car.

== Racing history ==
John Watson and Andrea de Cesaris drove the MP4/1 for most of the 1981 season with Niki Lauda replacing de Cesaris for the 1982 and 1983 seasons. In 1982, the updated MP4B nearly brought Watson to the World Championship, but he finished third behind Keke Rosberg and Didier Pironi, with 39 points. In the same year, however, it did take second in the Constructors' Championship, collecting 69 points.

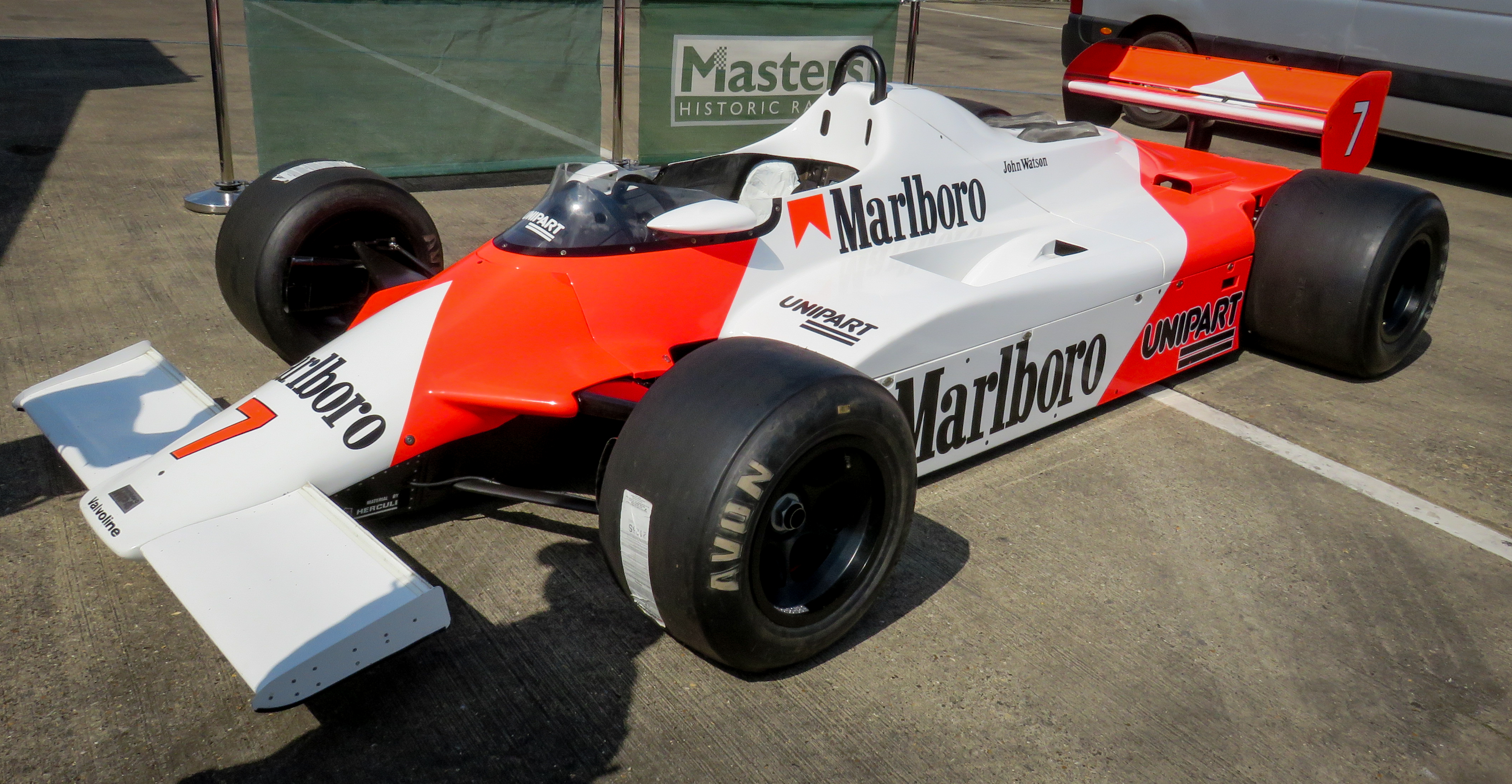
McLaren MP4/1B

For the 1983 season, the car was then updated into the MP4/1C, and the season started with a 1–2 finish for the MP4/1C at Round 2 in Long Beach, in which Watson won from 22nd on the grid – the farthest back on the grid a driver has won from in Formula One – and Lauda finished second from 23rd despite suffering from a worsening leg cramp. This car was used throughout most of the season but against the more powerful turbos of Renault, Ferrari and BMW, results with the outdated Cosworth V8 were becoming harder to come by, though Watson did finish third at the Detroit Grand Prix and the final race for the Cosworth car in Holland.

=== With Porsche: the MP4/1E ===
During the 1983 season, McLaren worked with Techniques d'Avant Garde and Porsche to develop a turbocharged V6 engine built to John Barnard's specifications and the MP4/1D was the test mule. Later in the season at the Dutch Grand Prix at Zandvoort the Cosworth-powered MP4/1C was replaced by the TAG-powered MP4/1E, which was essentially also a test mule that competed in only 4 races and had a different engine cover design similar to that of the MP4/2; according to Watson in an interview given in 2009 this was a car that was forced into appearing at the Dutch Grand Prix after political manoeuvring by Lauda. He went to Marlboro executive Aleardo Buzzi (the man responsible for giving McLaren their primary sponsorship money), behind the back of the McLaren team and complained extensively to Buzzi about the uncompetitiveness of the team without a turbo engine. Buzzi then withheld money that had been committed to McLaren to develop the TAG/Porsche turbo engine. This infuriated Dennis and designer John Barnard, who had designed the MP4/2 specifically for the new turbo-charged engine, but now had to re-design his MP4/1 to "E" spec for the TAG engine.

The MP4/1E was first driven by Watson, not Lauda, at the Porsche proving ground. It was competitive but the new engine was underdeveloped and had teething troubles. This made the car very unreliable, and it did not win any races. However, this car was not really expected to win or even finish races. In total, the MP4/1 brought McLaren 6 wins, 11 other podium finishes and a total of 131 points.

BBC commentator Murray Walker drove the MP4/1C at Silverstone in 1983.

During qualifying for the 1983 Italian Grand Prix, just the second race for the TAG-Porsche engines, and with MP4/1E's available for both Lauda and Watson, the new modified car proved its straight line speed with the McLarens joining the BMW powered Brabhams as the only cars above 300 km/h (186 mph) through the Monza speed trap, faster than the longer developed turbo engines from Renault (also powering Lotus), Ferrari and Alfa Romeo. Despite the straight line speed, teething problems with the new car and engine saw Lauda and Watson only qualify 13th and 15th respectively with Lauda over 4 seconds slower than pole sitter Riccardo Patrese in his Brabham BMW (Watson in his first race meeting with the turbo car was 5.5 seconds off pole). Neither McLaren finished the race with both drivers retiring with electrical troubles on laps 14 (Watson) and 25 (Lauda).

== Other ==
The MP4B (listed as the MP4/1B) is available as a classic car in the video game F1 2019.

== Complete Formula One World Championship results ==
(key) (results in bold indicate pole position; results in italics indicate fastest lap)

Year	Entrant	Chassis	Engine	Tyres	Drivers	1	2	3	4	5	6	7	8	9	10	11	12	13	14	15	16	Points	WCC
1981	Marlboro McLaren International	MP4	Cosworth DFV; V8 NA	MI		USW	BRA	ARG	SMR	BEL	MON	ESP	FRA	GBR	GER	AUT	NED	ITA	CAN	CPL		**28***	6th
1981	Marlboro McLaren International	MP4	Cosworth DFV; V8 NA	MI	John Watson			Ret	10	7	Ret	3	2	1	6	6	Ret	Ret	2	7		**28***	6th
1981	Marlboro McLaren International	MP4	Cosworth DFV; V8 NA	MI	Andrea de Cesaris						Ret	Ret	11	Ret	Ret	8	DNS	7	Ret	12		**28***	6th
1982	Marlboro McLaren International	MP4B	Cosworth DFV; V8 NA	MI		RSA	BRA	USW	SMR	BEL	MON	DET	CAN	NED	GBR	FRA	GER	AUT	SUI	ITA	CPL	**69**	2nd
1982	Marlboro McLaren International	MP4B	Cosworth DFV; V8 NA	MI	John Watson	6	2	6		1	Ret	1	3	9	Ret	Ret	Ret	9	13	4	2	**69**	2nd
1982	Marlboro McLaren International	MP4B	Cosworth DFV; V8 NA	MI	Niki Lauda	4	Ret	1		DSQ	Ret	Ret	Ret	4	1	8	DNS	5	3	Ret	Ret	**69**	2nd
1983	Marlboro McLaren International	MP4/1C	Cosworth DFV; V8 NA	MI		BRA	USW	FRA	SMR	MON	BEL	DET	CAN	GBR	GER	AUT	NED	ITA	EUR	RSA		**34**	5th
1983	Marlboro McLaren International	MP4/1C	Cosworth DFV; V8 NA	MI	John Watson	Ret	1	Ret	5	DNQ	Ret	3	6	9	5	9	3					**34**	5th
1983	Marlboro McLaren International	MP4/1C	Cosworth DFV; V8 NA	MI	Niki Lauda	3	2	Ret	Ret	DNQ	Ret	Ret	Ret	6	DSQ	6						**34**	5th
1983	Marlboro McLaren International	MP4/1E	TAG Porsche TTE PO1; V6 tc	MI	John Watson													Ret	Ret	DSQ		**0**	NC
1983	Marlboro McLaren International	MP4/1E	TAG Porsche TTE PO1; V6 tc	MI	Niki Lauda												Ret	Ret	Ret	11		**0**	NC

* 1 point in 1981 scored using the McLaren M29
