= 1983 French Grand Prix =

- Race 3 of 15 in the 1983 Formula One World Championship
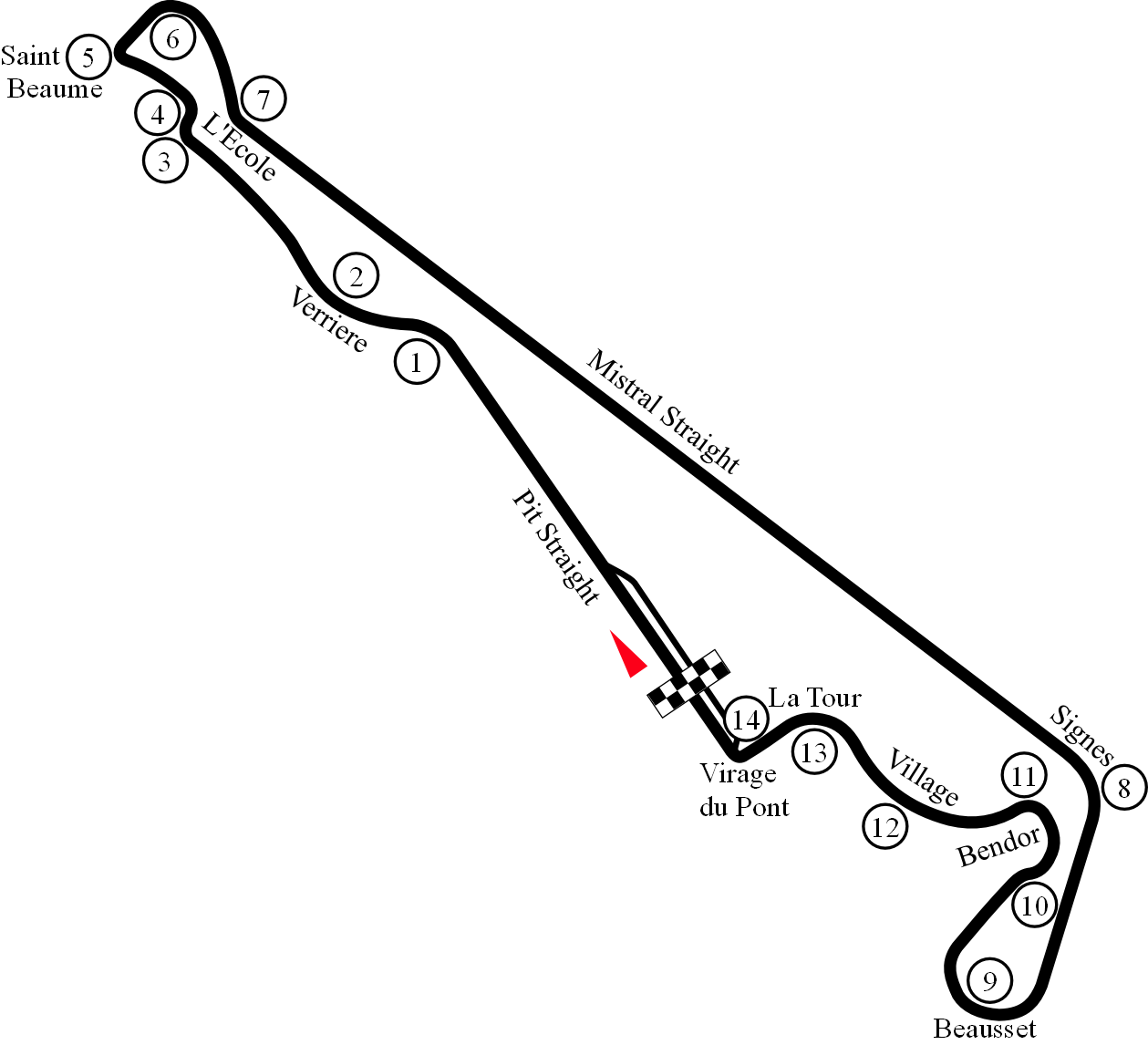

Race details
- Date: 17 April 1983
- Location: Circuit Paul Ricard; Le Castellet, Var, France
- Course: Permanent racing facility
- Course length: 5.810 km (3.610 miles)
- Distance: 54 laps, 313.740 km (194.949 miles)
- Weather: Dry, grey and cool

Pole position
Driver	(France) Alain Prost	Renault
- Time: 1:36.672

Fastest lap
Driver	(France) Alain Prost	Renault
- Time: 1:42.695 on lap 34

Podium
First	(France) Alain Prost	Renault
Second	(Brazil) Nelson Piquet	Brabham-BMW
Third	(United States) Eddie Cheever	Renault

The 1983 French Grand Prix was a Formula One motor race held at Paul Ricard on 17 April 1983. It was the third race of the 1983 Formula One World Championship.

French driver Alain Prost won the race for the Renault team, and this was the French marque's 3rd French Grand Prix win in a row and the 4th in 5 seasons. Second was the Brabham-BMW of 1981 World Champion Nelson Piquet, with Prost's Renault teammate Eddie Cheever finishing third. Rounding out the points finishers were Patrick Tambay in his Ferrari, and the non-turbo Williamses of Keke Rosberg and Jacques Laffite. This was the final time that both Renault cars started on the front row until the 2003 Malaysian Grand Prix, when young Spaniard Fernando Alonso and Jarno Trulli started on the front row.

== Summary ==
=== Qualifying ===
On home soil, Renault dominated the French Grand Prix. Alain Prost took pole position 2.3 seconds faster than second placed teammate Eddie Cheever. It would be Cheever's best ever qualifying position in Formula One. On the fast Circuit Paul Ricard with its 1.8 km long Mistral Straight, the turbo engines with their greater power had a large advantage. The fastest normally-aspirated car was the 12th placed McLaren-Ford of Long Beach runner up Niki Lauda, qualifying some 4.3 seconds slower than pole-sitter Prost. After occupying the front row of the grid at Long Beach, Ferrari had difficulty with René Arnoux qualifying 4th and Tambay faring worse, only qualifying 11th.

Chico Serra returned to the grid in the No.30 Arrows-Ford after the expected sponsorship that would have kept Australia's 1980 World Champion Alan Jones in the seat for the remainder of the season fell through at the last minute. Serra, who qualified 26th in France, would only last this and the next two races in Imola and Monaco before Arrows team boss Jackie Oliver replaced him for good with Belgian rookie Thierry Boutsen (who had finished 2nd and 3rd respectively in the 1981 and 1982 European Formula Two Championships) at the Belgian Grand Prix.

Failing to qualify for the race were the RAM-Fords of Eliseo Salazar and debutante Jean-Louis Schlesser, and the Osella of Piercarlo Ghinzani.

=== Race ===
As he had done in qualifying, Prost dominated the race for his first win in over 12 months, only losing the lead during the mid-race pit stops. Piquet finished second in the Brabham-BMW while Eddie Cheever finished 3rd in his Renault. Tambay managed to salvage what had been a tough weekend by finishing 4th with the Williams pair of Rosberg and Laffite finishing a lap down in 5th and 6th respectively.

Before the race, Lotus driver Nigel Mansell had his toes accidentally run over by his own team pushing his car in the pits which caused him to need a pain killing injection. He started the race but retired after just 6 laps when the pain of pushing the pedals became unbearable. Long Beach winner John Watson was the races first retirement on lap 3 with engine failure in his McLaren.

== Classification ==
=== Qualifying ===
Pos	No	Driver	Constructor	Q1	Q2	Gap
1	15	(France) Alain Prost	Renault	1:38.358	1:36.672	—
2	16	(United States) Eddie Cheever	Renault	1:38.980	1:39.785	+2.308
3	6	(Italy) Riccardo Patrese	Brabham-BMW	1:41.095	1:39.104	+2.432
4	28	(France) René Arnoux	Ferrari	1:40.027	1:39.115	+2.443
5	11	(Italy) Elio de Angelis	Lotus-Renault	1:39.512	1:39.312	+2.640
6	5	(Brazil) Nelson Piquet	Brabham-BMW	1:39.601	1:39.746	+2.929
7	22	(Italy) Andrea de Cesaris	Alfa Romeo	1:38.099†	1:39.611	+2.939
8	23	(Italy) Mauro Baldi	Alfa Romeo	1:41.215	1:39.618	+2.946
9	35	(United Kingdom) Derek Warwick	Toleman-Hart	1:43.038	1:39.881	+3.209
10	9	(West Germany) Manfred Winkelhock	ATS-BMW	1:40.233	1:44.997	+3.561
11	27	(France) Patrick Tambay	Ferrari	1:40.393	1:40.488	+3.721
12	8	(Austria) Niki Lauda	McLaren-Ford	1:41.065	1:41.492	+4.393
13	36	(Italy) Bruno Giacomelli	Toleman-Hart	1:42.219	1:41.775	+5.103
14	7	(United Kingdom) John Watson	McLaren-Ford	1:41.838	1:42.448	+5.166
15	3	(Italy) Michele Alboreto	Tyrrell-Ford	1:42.177	1:43.317	+5.505
16	1	(Finland) Keke Rosberg	Williams-Ford	1:42.450	1:42.551	+5.778
17	34	(Venezuela) Johnny Cecotto	Theodore-Ford	1:43.552	1:42.615	+5.943
18	12	(United Kingdom) Nigel Mansell	Lotus-Ford	1:43.320	1:42.650	+5.978
19	2	(France) Jacques Laffite	Williams-Ford	1:43.295	1:42.678	+6.006
20	25	(France) Jean-Pierre Jarier	Ligier-Ford	1:42.808	1:42.737	+6.065
21	29	(Switzerland) Marc Surer	Arrows-Ford	1:42.962	1:44.346	+6.290
22	33	(Colombia) Roberto Guerrero	Theodore-Ford	1:43.367	1:43.602	+6.695
23	31	(Italy) Corrado Fabi	Osella-Ford	1:45.638	1:43.411	+6.739
24	4	(United States) Danny Sullivan	Tyrrell-Ford	1:44.317	1:43.654	+6.982
25	26	(Brazil) Raul Boesel	Ligier-Ford	1:44.470	1:44.905	+7.798
26	30	(Brazil) Chico Serra	Arrows-Ford	1:44.778	1:45.859	+8.106
27	17	(Chile) Eliseo Salazar	RAM-Ford	1:45.073	2:02.335	+8.401
28	32	(Italy) Piercarlo Ghinzani	Osella-Ford	1:46.541	1:45.812	+9.140
29	18	(France) Jean-Louis Schlesser	RAM-Ford	1:45.866	1:46.102	+9.194

- † — Time disallowed

=== Race ===
Pos	No	Driver	Constructor	Tyre	Laps	Time/Retired	Grid	Points
1	15	(France) Alain Prost	Renault	MI	54	1:34:13.913	1	9
2	5	(Brazil) Nelson Piquet	Brabham-BMW	MI	54	+ 29.720	6	6
3	16	(United States) Eddie Cheever	Renault	MI	54	+ 40.232	2	4
4	27	(France) Patrick Tambay	Ferrari	G	54	+ 1:06.880	11	3
5	1	(Finland) Keke Rosberg	Williams-Ford	G	53	+ 1 Lap	16	2
6	2	(France) Jacques Laffite	Williams-Ford	G	53	+ 1 Lap	19	1
7	28	(France) René Arnoux	Ferrari	G	53	+ 1 Lap	4	
8	3	(Italy) Michele Alboreto	Tyrrell-Ford	G	53	+ 1 Lap	15	
9	25	(France) Jean-Pierre Jarier	Ligier-Ford	MI	53	+ 1 Lap	20	
10	29	(Switzerland) Marc Surer	Arrows-Ford	G	53	+ 1 Lap	21	
11	34	(Venezuela) Johnny Cecotto	Theodore-Ford	G	52	+ 2 Laps	17	
12	22	(Italy) Andrea de Cesaris	Alfa Romeo	MI	50	+ 4 Laps	7	
13	36	(Italy) Bruno Giacomelli	Toleman-Hart	P	49	Gearbox	13	
Ret	26	(Brazil) Raul Boesel	Ligier-Ford	MI	47	Engine	25	
Ret	31	(Italy) Corrado Fabi	Osella-Ford	MI	36	Engine	23	
Ret	9	(West Germany) Manfred Winkelhock	ATS-BMW	G	36	Turbo	10	
Ret	8	(Austria) Niki Lauda	McLaren-Ford	MI	29	Wheel bearing	12	
Ret	23	(Italy) Mauro Baldi	Alfa Romeo	MI	28	Spun Off	8	
Ret	30	(Brazil) Chico Serra	Arrows-Ford	G	26	Gearbox	26	
Ret	33	(Colombia) Roberto Guerrero	Theodore-Ford	G	23	Engine	22	
Ret	4	(United States) Danny Sullivan	Tyrrell-Ford	G	21	Clutch	24	
Ret	11	(Italy) Elio de Angelis	Lotus-Renault	P	20	Electrical	5	
Ret	6	(Italy) Riccardo Patrese	Brabham-BMW	MI	19	Water Leak	3	
Ret	35	(United Kingdom) Derek Warwick	Toleman-Hart	P	14	Engine	9	
Ret	12	(United Kingdom) Nigel Mansell	Lotus-Ford	P	6	Physical	18	
Ret	7	(United Kingdom) John Watson	McLaren-Ford	MI	3	Engine	14	
DNQ	17	(Chile) Eliseo Salazar	RAM-Ford	P				
DNQ	32	(Italy) Piercarlo Ghinzani	Osella-Ford	MI				
DNQ	18	(France) Jean-Louis Schlesser	RAM-Ford	P				

== Championship standings after the race ==
Drivers' Championship standings

Pos	Driver	Points
1	(Brazil) Nelson Piquet	15
2	(Austria) Niki Lauda	10
3	(France) Alain Prost	9
4	(United Kingdom) John Watson	9
5	(France) Jacques Laffite	7

Constructors' Championship standings

Pos	Constructor	Points
1	(United Kingdom) McLaren-Ford	19
2	(United Kingdom) Brabham-BMW	15
3	(France) Renault	13
4	(Italy) Ferrari	9
5	(United Kingdom) Williams-Ford	9

- Note: Only the top five positions are included for both sets of standings.

Previous race: 1983 United States Grand Prix West	FIA Formula One World Championship; 1983 season	Next race: 1983 San Marino Grand Prix
Previous race: 1982 French Grand Prix	French Grand Prix	Next race: 1984 French Grand Prix
