= 1983 United States Grand Prix =

1983 United States Grand Prix may refer to:

- 1983 Detroit Grand Prix
- 1983 United States Grand Prix West
