= 1983 Formula One World Championship =

37th season of FIA Formula One motor racing

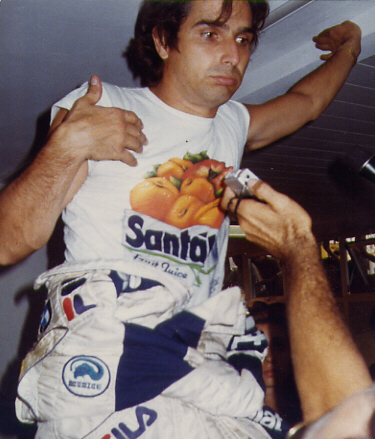
Nelson Piquet won his second Drivers' Championship by two points, driving for Brabham.

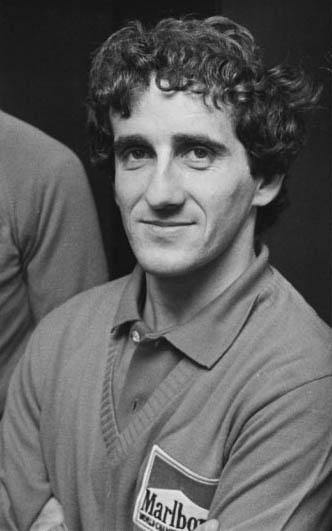
Alain Prost (pictured in 1984), driving for Renault, finished runner-up by two points despite leading for most of the season.

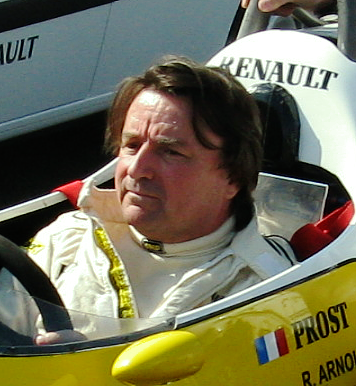
René Arnoux (pictured in 2008), driving for Ferrari, finished third, ten points behind Piquet.

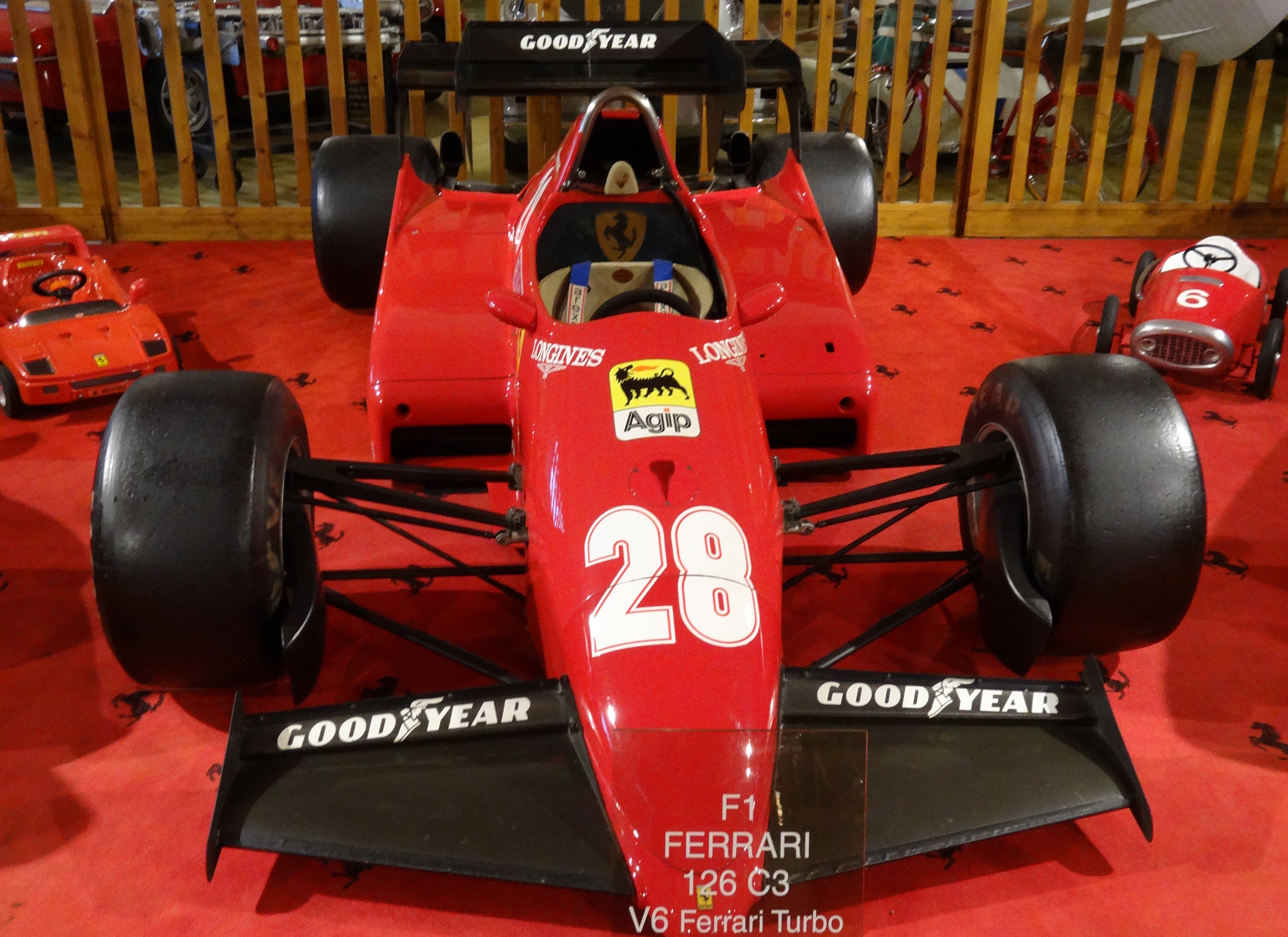
Ferrari won the Constructors' Championship with the 126C3.

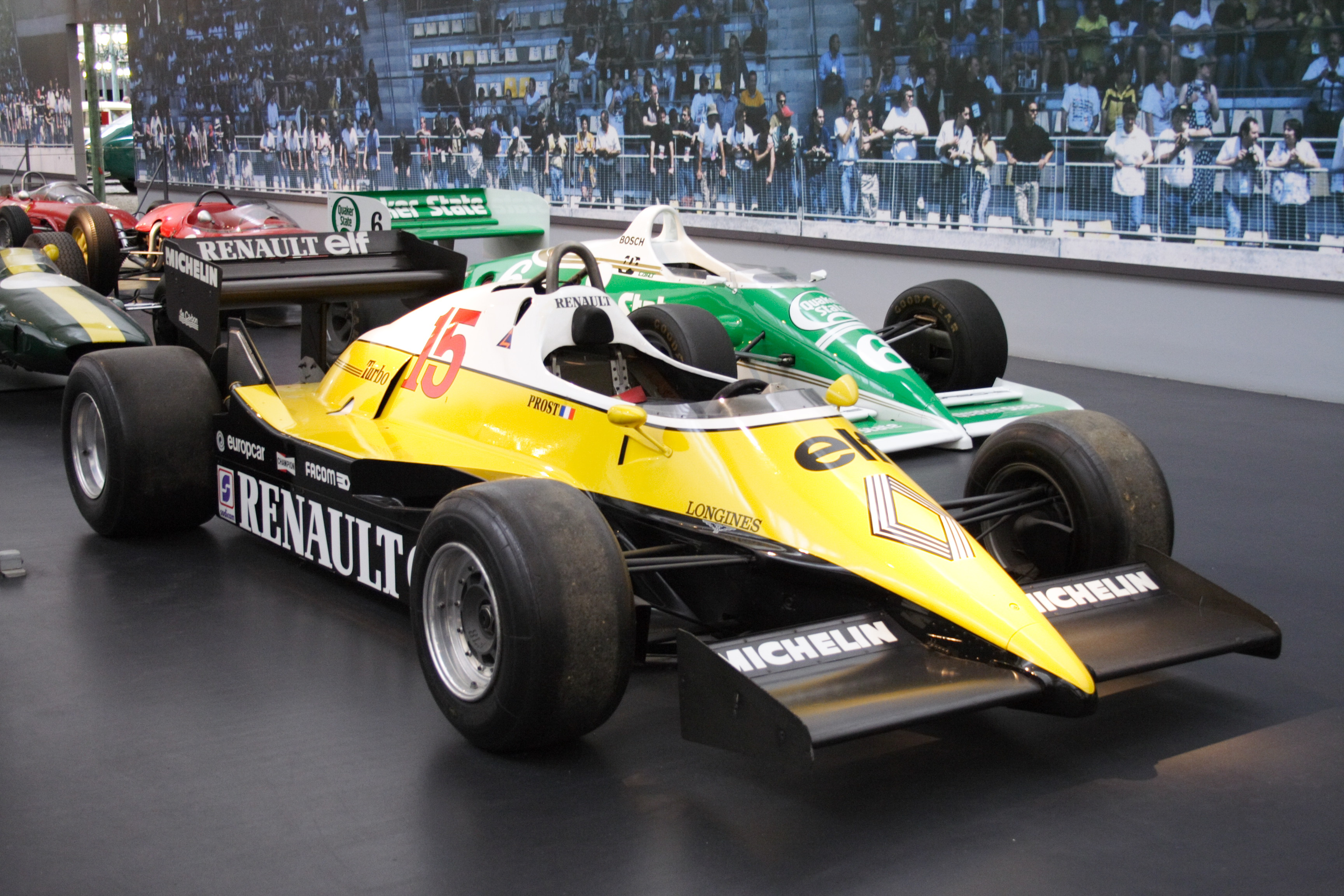
Renault placed second with the RE40.

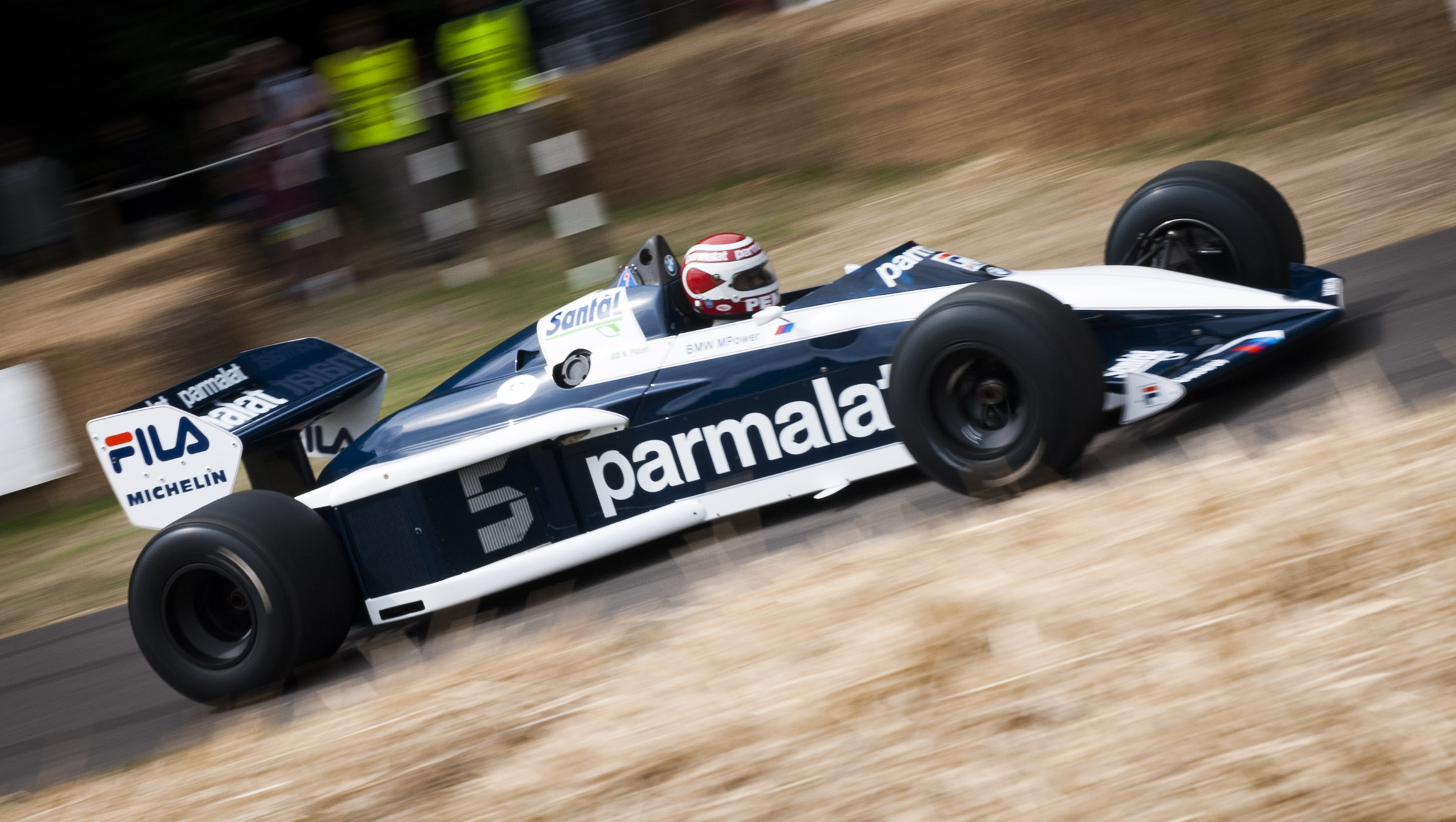
Brabham placed third with the BT52-BMW.

The 1983 FIA Formula One World Championship was the 37th season of FIA Formula One motor racing. It featured the 1983 Formula One World Championship for Drivers and the 1983 Formula One World Championship for Manufacturers, which were contested concurrently over a fifteen-race series that commenced on 13 March and ended on 15 October.

Nelson Piquet, driving for Brabham, won the Drivers' Championship, for the second time. Renault driver Alain Prost led the championship from the Belgian Grand Prix in May until the final race in South Africa, where he retired and enabled the Brazilian to snatch the title. It was the first title by a driver using a turbocharged engine and the last title by a Brabham driver. Piquet won the title despite his team only finishing third in the World Constructors Championship; he would be the last Drivers' Champion for a constructor that was placed third or lower until 2024.

Ferrari won the Constructors' Championship, despite neither of its drivers finishing in the top two positions of the Drivers' Championship with the Maranello team's highest placing driver, René Arnoux, finishing only third in the drivers' standings overall – a unique feat in Formula One history.

The season also included a non-championship Formula One race for the last time: the Race of Champions, held at Brands Hatch early April and won by defending World Champion Keke Rosberg. Brands Hatch would also host a championship round later that year under the European Grand Prix title, the first time that race title had been used as an official race title for a standalone championship event rather than being used as an honorary designation for pre-existing national Grands Prix as had been the case in previous seasons.

== Drivers and constructors ==
Avon exited as a tyre supplier after two seasons.

The following drivers and constructors contested the 1983 FIA Formula One World Championship.

Entrant	Constructor	Chassis	Engine	Tyres	No	Driver	Rounds
(United Kingdom) TAG Williams Team	Williams-Ford	FW08C	Ford Cosworth DFV 3.0 V8	G	1	(Finland) Keke Rosberg	1–14
(United Kingdom) TAG Williams Team	Williams-Ford	FW08C	Ford Cosworth DFV 3.0 V8	G	2	(France) Jacques Laffite	1–14
(United Kingdom) TAG Williams Team	Williams-Ford	FW08C	Ford Cosworth DFV 3.0 V8	G	42	(United Kingdom) Jonathan Palmer	14
(United Kingdom) TAG Williams Team	Williams-Honda	FW09	Honda RA163-E 1.5 V6 t	G	1	(Finland) Keke Rosberg	15
(United Kingdom) TAG Williams Team	Williams-Honda	FW09	Honda RA163-E 1.5 V6 t	G	2	(France) Jacques Laffite	15
(United Kingdom) Benetton Tyrrell Team	Tyrrell-Ford	011B; 012	Ford Cosworth DFV 3.0 V8; Ford Cosworth DFY 3.0 V8	G	3	(Italy) Michele Alboreto	All
(United Kingdom) Benetton Tyrrell Team	Tyrrell-Ford	011B; 012	Ford Cosworth DFV 3.0 V8; Ford Cosworth DFY 3.0 V8	G	4	(United States) Danny Sullivan	All
(United Kingdom) Fila Sport	Brabham-BMW	BT52; BT52B	BMW M12/13 1.5 L4 t	M	5	(Brazil) Nelson Piquet	All
(United Kingdom) Fila Sport	Brabham-BMW	BT52; BT52B	BMW M12/13 1.5 L4 t	M	6	(Italy) Riccardo Patrese	All
(United Kingdom) Marlboro McLaren International Team	McLaren-Ford	MP4/1C	Ford Cosworth DFV 3.0 V8; Ford Cosworth DFY 3.0 V8	M	7	(United Kingdom) John Watson	1–12
(United Kingdom) Marlboro McLaren International Team	McLaren-Ford	MP4/1C	Ford Cosworth DFV 3.0 V8; Ford Cosworth DFY 3.0 V8	M	8	(Austria) Niki Lauda	1–11
(United Kingdom) Marlboro McLaren International Team	McLaren-TAG	MP4/1E	TAG TTE PO1 1.5 V6 t	M	7	(United Kingdom) John Watson	13–15
(United Kingdom) Marlboro McLaren International Team	McLaren-TAG	MP4/1E	TAG TTE PO1 1.5 V6 t	M	8	(Austria) Niki Lauda	12–15
(West Germany) Team ATS	ATS-BMW	D6	BMW M12/13 1.5 L4 t	G	9	(West Germany) Manfred Winkelhock	All
(United Kingdom) John Player Special Team Lotus	Lotus-Ford	92	Ford Cosworth DFV 3.0 V8; Ford Cosworth DFY 3.0 V8	P	11	(Italy) Elio de Angelis	1
(United Kingdom) John Player Special Team Lotus	Lotus-Ford	92	Ford Cosworth DFV 3.0 V8; Ford Cosworth DFY 3.0 V8	P	12	(United Kingdom) Nigel Mansell	1–8
(United Kingdom) John Player Special Team Lotus	Lotus-Renault	93T; 94T	Renault-Gordini EF1 1.5 V6 t	P	11	(Italy) Elio de Angelis	2–15
(United Kingdom) John Player Special Team Lotus	Lotus-Renault	93T; 94T	Renault-Gordini EF1 1.5 V6 t	P	12	(United Kingdom) Nigel Mansell	9–15
(France) Équipe Renault Elf	Renault	RE30C; RE40	Renault-Gordini EF1 1.5 V6 t	M	15	(France) Alain Prost	All
(France) Équipe Renault Elf	Renault	RE30C; RE40	Renault-Gordini EF1 1.5 V6 t	M	16	(United States) Eddie Cheever	All
(United Kingdom) RAM Racing Team March	RAM-Ford	01	Ford Cosworth DFV 3.0 V8; Ford Cosworth DFY 3.0 V8	P	17	(Chile) Eliseo Salazar	1–6
(United Kingdom) RAM Racing Team March	RAM-Ford	01	Ford Cosworth DFV 3.0 V8; Ford Cosworth DFY 3.0 V8	P	17	(Canada) Jacques Villeneuve Sr.	8
(United Kingdom) RAM Racing Team March	RAM-Ford	01	Ford Cosworth DFV 3.0 V8; Ford Cosworth DFY 3.0 V8	P	17	(United Kingdom) Kenny Acheson	9–15
(United Kingdom) RAM Racing Team March	RAM-Ford	01	Ford Cosworth DFV 3.0 V8; Ford Cosworth DFY 3.0 V8	P	18	(France) Jean-Louis Schlesser	3
(Italy) Marlboro Team Alfa Romeo	Alfa Romeo	183T	Alfa Romeo 890T 1.5 V8 t	M	22	(Italy) Andrea de Cesaris	All
(Italy) Marlboro Team Alfa Romeo	Alfa Romeo	183T	Alfa Romeo 890T 1.5 V8 t	M	23	(Italy) Mauro Baldi	All
(France) Équipe Ligier Gitanes	Ligier-Ford	JS21	Ford Cosworth DFV 3.0 V8; Ford Cosworth DFY 3.0 V8	M	25	(France) Jean-Pierre Jarier	All
(France) Équipe Ligier Gitanes	Ligier-Ford	JS21	Ford Cosworth DFV 3.0 V8; Ford Cosworth DFY 3.0 V8	M	26	(Brazil) Raul Boesel	All
(Italy) Ferrari	Ferrari	126C2B; 126C3	Ferrari 021 1.5 V6 t	G	27	(France) Patrick Tambay	All
(Italy) Ferrari	Ferrari	126C2B; 126C3	Ferrari 021 1.5 V6 t	G	28	(France) René Arnoux	All
(United Kingdom) Arrows Racing Team	Arrows-Ford	A6	Ford Cosworth DFV 3.0 V8	G	29	(Switzerland) Marc Surer	All
(United Kingdom) Arrows Racing Team	Arrows-Ford	A6	Ford Cosworth DFV 3.0 V8	G	30	(Brazil) Chico Serra	1, 3–5
(United Kingdom) Arrows Racing Team	Arrows-Ford	A6	Ford Cosworth DFV 3.0 V8	G	30	(Australia) Alan Jones	2
(United Kingdom) Arrows Racing Team	Arrows-Ford	A6	Ford Cosworth DFV 3.0 V8	G	30	(Belgium) Thierry Boutsen	6–15
(Italy) Kelémata Osella	Osella-Ford	FA1D	Ford Cosworth DFV 3.0 V8	M	31	(Italy) Corrado Fabi	1–8
(Italy) Kelémata Osella	Osella-Ford	FA1D	Ford Cosworth DFV 3.0 V8	M	32	(Italy) Piercarlo Ghinzani	1–3
(Italy) Kelémata Osella	Osella-Alfa Romeo	FA1E	Alfa Romeo 1260 3.0 V12	M	31	(Italy) Corrado Fabi	9–15
(Italy) Kelémata Osella	Osella-Alfa Romeo	FA1E	Alfa Romeo 1260 3.0 V12	M	32	(Italy) Piercarlo Ghinzani	4–15
(Hong Kong) Theodore Racing Team	Theodore-Ford	N183	Ford Cosworth DFV 3.0 V8	G	33	(Colombia) Roberto Guerrero	1–14
(Hong Kong) Theodore Racing Team	Theodore-Ford	N183	Ford Cosworth DFV 3.0 V8	G	34	(Venezuela) Johnny Cecotto	1–13
(United Kingdom) Candy Toleman Motorsport	Toleman-Hart	TG183B	Hart 415T 1.5 L4 t	P	35	(United Kingdom) Derek Warwick	All
(United Kingdom) Candy Toleman Motorsport	Toleman-Hart	TG183B	Hart 415T 1.5 L4 t	P	36	(Italy) Bruno Giacomelli	All
(United Kingdom) Spirit Racing	Spirit-Honda	201; 201C	Honda RA163-E 1.5 V6 t	G	40	(Sweden) Stefan Johansson	9–14

=== Team changes ===
- Lotus would be without team founder Colin Chapman after the legendary team boss's sudden death from a heart attack on 16 December 1982 at the age of 54. Chapman's right-hand man Peter Warr took over as team manager.
- Fittipaldi closed its doors due to insufficient funds.
- Ensign was merged into the existing Theodore team.
- March Engineering had been building cars for RAM Racing from 1981. From 1983 on, the chassis was labeled RAM and the March name was only seen in the official entry list.
- ATS switched from Ford-Cosworth V8s in 1982 to BMW 1.5 litre turbo engines for this season. Likewise, Alfa Romeo traded their V12 engine for freshly developed V8 turbos called the 890T.
- Ligier lost their Talbot sponsorship and, with that, the use of the Matra V12s. They managed to buy a supply of Cosworth V8 engines.

==== Mid-season changes ====
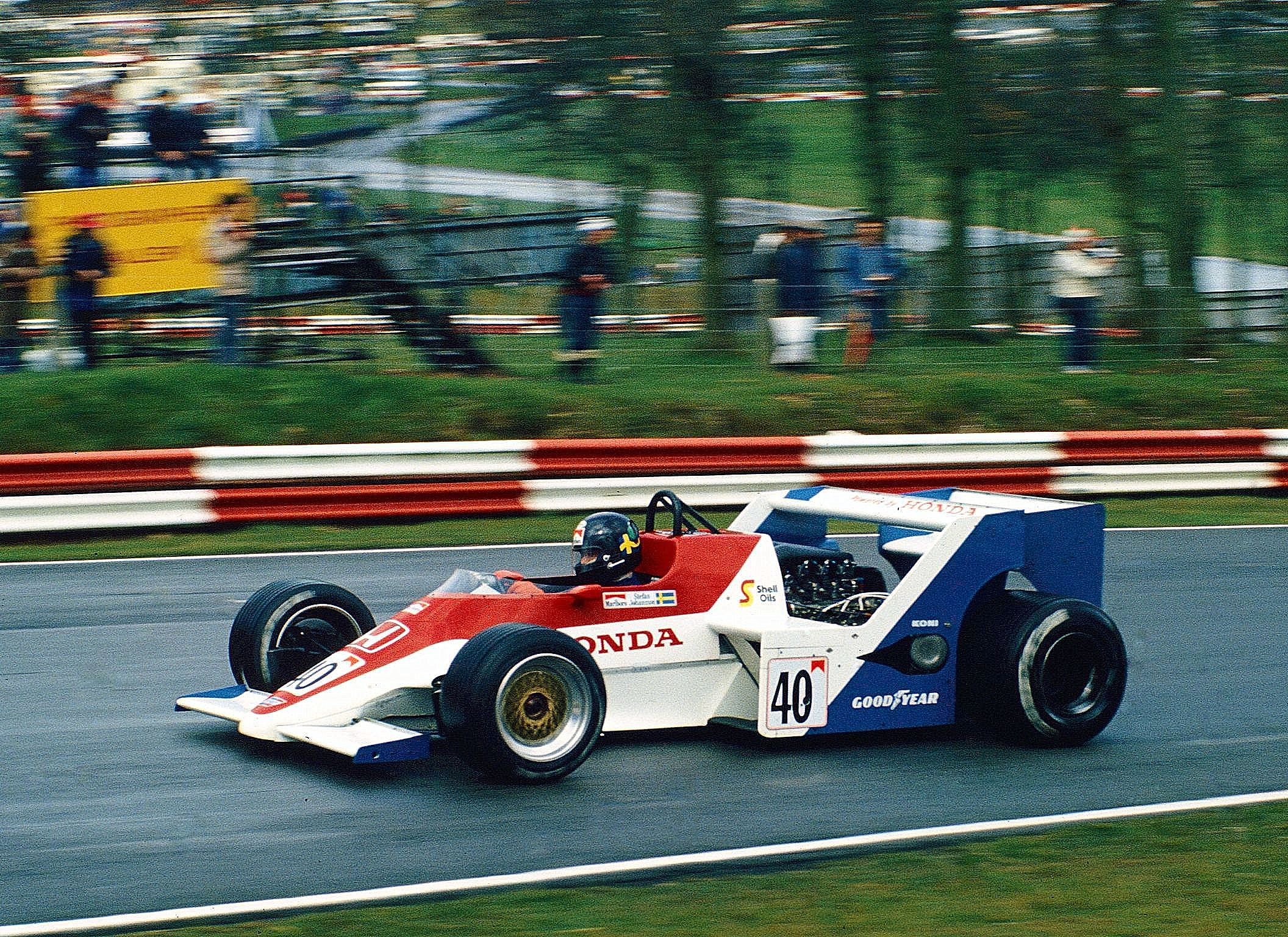
Spirit Racing and the Honda V6 turbo made their F1 debut in the non-championship 1983 Race of Champions at Brands Hatch

- There was a clear trend of manufacturers switching from naturally aspirated engines to turbocharged engines, attracted by their power output. Most teams were careful in their approach, running the old and new cars simultaneously, before finally stepping over to turbo.
  - After the opening race in Brazil, Lotus switched Elio de Angelis from the Ford-Cosworth V8 powered car to the Renault V6 turbo, the same as used by the factory Renault team. Nigel Mansell continued with the Cosworth powered car until the British Grand Prix.
  - At the Dutch Grand Prix, McLaren went from Cosworth V8s to the Porsche built V6 TAG turbo engine for Niki Lauda while John Watson had to wait until the next race in Italy before he also got turbo power. The engine was labelled as the TAG turbo after sponsor Techniques d'Avant Garde.
  - At the final round of the season in South Africa, Williams also made the switch from Cosworth V8s to Honda V6 turbos. Williams got exclusive use of the Honda engines at the expense of the Spirit team.
- Osella, too, stopped using Cosworth V8s, but then went a different way from their rivals: they bought one-year-old Alfa Romeo V12 engines.
- Spirit Racing debuted in Formula One with factory backing from Honda. They entered the 1982 European Formula Two Championship with Marlboro sponsorship and were immediately successful. Before the end of the year, they had developed a F1-ready chassis powered by a Honda turbo engine and begin a testing programme. The team's first championship race was the British Grand Prix with Swede Stefan Johansson at the wheel. The team lost their Honda engines to Williams before the final race of the season.

=== Driver changes ===
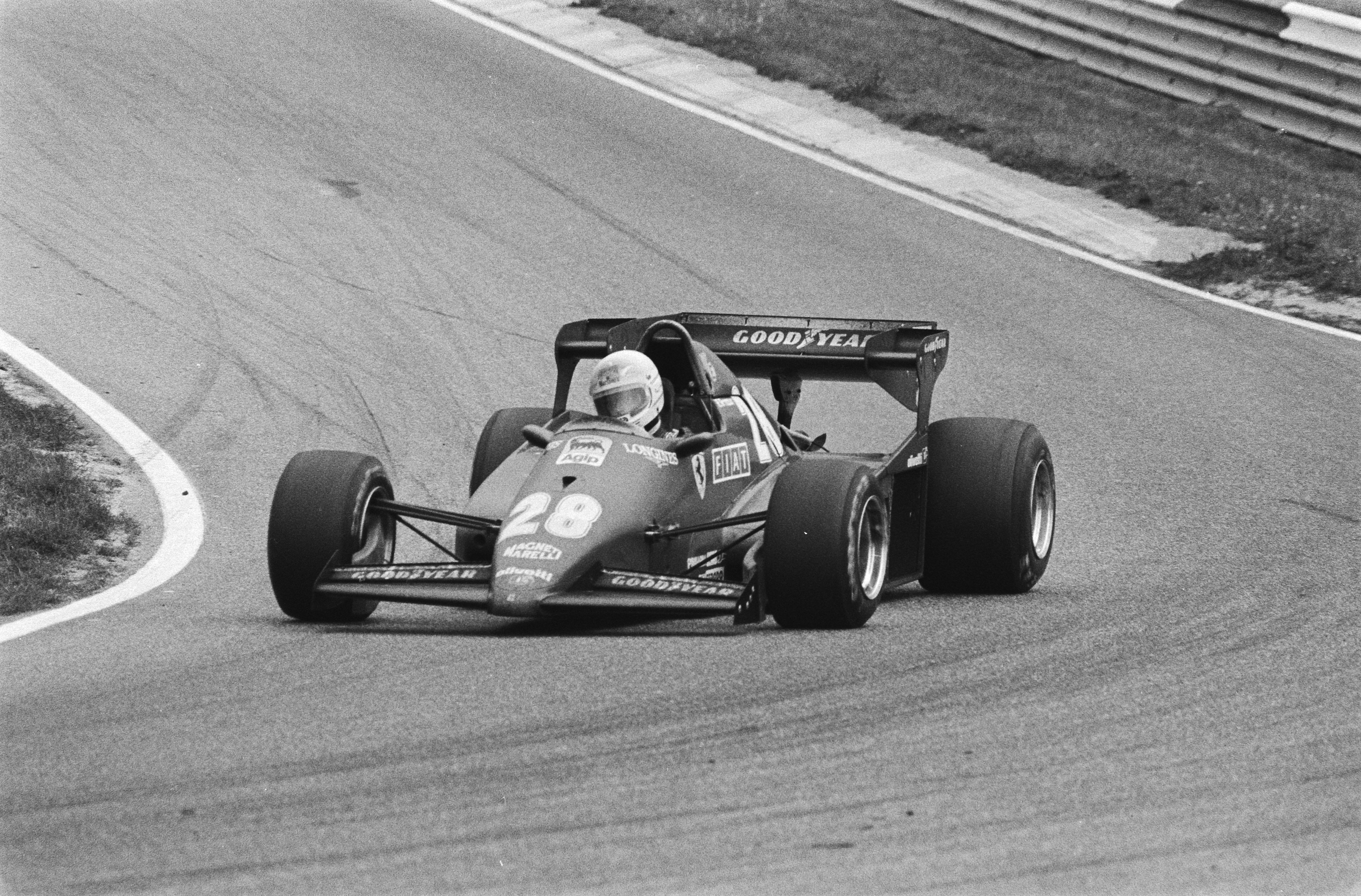
René Arnoux at the 1983 Dutch Grand Prix

- After four years with Renault, René Arnoux was attracted by 1982 Manufacturers' Champion Ferrari, as teammate to Patrick Tambay. Renault then signed Eddie Cheever from Ligier.
- Meanwhile, the other Ligier driver, Jacques Laffite, had moved to Williams. So the French team had to find a new driver pair: Jean-Pierre Jarier from Osella and Raul Boesel from March.
- Another eight driver changes happened in the lower-ranking teams.

==== Mid-season changes ====
- During the season, RAM put four different drivers in their car.
- Alan Jones came out of retirement for a one-time drive with Arrows instead of their driver Chico Serra. The Brazilian was definitely replaced when sportscar driver Thierry Boutsen paid to make his F1 debut at his home race and was allowed to finish the season.
- After one enthusiastic attempt in 1980 with Shadow, Stefan Johansson made his racing debut with Spirit, having driven for the team in Formula Two.
- As a 'thank you' from Williams's team leaders, Jonathan Palmer made his F1 debut in a third Williams car during his home race at Brands Hatch.

== Calendar ==
Round	Grand Prix	Circuit	Date
1	Brazilian Grand Prix	(Brazil) Autodromo Jacarepaguá, Rio de Janeiro	13 March
2	United States Grand Prix West	(United States) Long Beach Street Circuit, California	27 March
3	French Grand Prix	(France) Circuit Paul Ricard, Le Castellet	17 April
4	San Marino Grand Prix	(Italy) Autodromo Dino Ferrari, Imola	1 May
5	Monaco Grand Prix	Circuit de Monaco, Monte Carlo	15 May
6	Belgian Grand Prix	(Belgium) Circuit de Spa-Francorchamps, Stavelot	22 May
7	Detroit Grand Prix	(United States) Detroit Street Circuit, Michigan	5 June
8	Canadian Grand Prix	(Canada) Circuit Gilles Villeneuve, Montreal	12 June
9	British Grand Prix	(United Kingdom) Silverstone Circuit, Silverstone	16 July
10	German Grand Prix	(West Germany) Hockenheimring, Hockenheim	7 August
11	Austrian Grand Prix	(Austria) Österreichring, Spielberg	14 August
12	Dutch Grand Prix	(Netherlands) Circuit Park Zandvoort, Zandvoort	28 August
13	Italian Grand Prix	(Italy) Autodromo Nazionale di Monza, Monza	11 September
14	European Grand Prix	(United Kingdom) Brands Hatch, West Kingsdown	25 September
15	South African Grand Prix	(South Africa) Kyalami Grand Prix Circuit, Midrand	15 October

=== Calendar changes ===
Although the provisional calendar showed 18 Grands Prix, 15 were confirmed, one less than the year before.

- The South African Grand Prix was moved from season opener to be the season finale.
- The French Grand Prix was moved up from July to April.
- The Belgian Grand Prix was held at Circuit de Spa-Francorchamps instead of Circuit Zolder, as part of an agreement to alternate between the venues, and moved back on the schedule, after the Monaco Grand Prix. In similar fashion, this year's British Grand Prix was held at Silverstone instead of Brands Hatch. The latter venue stayed on the calendar under the guise of the European Grand Prix.
- The Dutch Grand Prix was moved back from early July to the end of August.
- The Swiss Grand Prix at Dijon-Prenois and Caesars Palace Grand Prix in Las Vegas were removed from the calendar.

The last ever non-championship Formula One race was held in 1983 with the Race of Champions held at Brands Hatch on 10 April between the United States Grand Prix West (Round 2) at Long Beach and the French Grand Prix (Round 3) at Paul Ricard.

==== Provisional calendar ====
- Organisers had been trying to let the Argentine Grand Prix return since 1982. The race was scheduled for 30 January, but was later cancelled.
- The Swiss Grand Prix had been scheduled for 10 July but the French broadcaster TF1 refused to screen the race having previously showed the French Grand Prix earlier in the season citing the expense of having to cover 2 races in the same season.
- Plans were made to host the Grand Prix of the Soviet Union in Moscow on 21 August, but these plans fell through due to bureaucratic barriers.
- A Grand Prix in New York City, to be held on a temporary circuit at Flushing Meadows in Queens, was scheduled for 25 September, but after certain problems, the event was cancelled and replaced by the European Grand Prix at Brands Hatch which had hosted the non-championship Race of Champions earlier in the year.
- The Las Vegas Grand Prix was scheduled for October 9 but was cancelled.

== Regulation changes ==
- A major change in technical regulations mandated a flat undertray for the cars, with a complete ban on the ground effect technology pioneered by the Lotus 78 in 1977. This was done to reduce downforce and cornering speeds, which were deemed to have reached dangerous levels in 1982, a season in which several violent and fatal accidents occurred.
- Four-wheel drive was banned, as well as cars with more than four wheels.
- The minimum weight was set at 540 kg (1,190 lb).
- The red light at the back of the car should have a power of at least 21W.

== Season report ==
=== Early season ===
==== Race 1: Brazil ====
Six weeks before the start of what was supposed to be Round 2 in Brazil, FISA had banned ground effects and the sliding skirts while also mandating that all cars had to have flat bottoms. As a result, the organizers agreed to move the South African Grand Prix at Kyalami from the first race of the season to the last race in order to give the teams time to get their cars ready for the new regulations. So, the season began in Brazil at the Jacarepagua Riocentro Autodrome in Rio de Janeiro. Defending World Champion Keke Rosberg took pole position (the last non-turbo pole position and front row start until 1989, the last Cosworth V8 pole position until 1993, and last Cosworth V8 front row start until 1990). Rosberg took the lead from the start and held it for six laps, but lost the lead to Nelson Piquet on lap 7, his Williams not being able to hold out the much more powerful Brabham BMW turbo on the long back straight. Rosberg's car then caught fire during his pitstop for fuel and tyres (the first one Williams had ever done). With the fire extinguished, he fought back from ninth to finish second behind Piquet (who never lost the lead once he got it), but was subsequently disqualified for receiving a push start in the pits. This left an unprecedented situation, as the organisers decided not to award second to Niki Lauda, who finished third, but to leave the position vacant. As such, only five drivers scored points, and other than Piquet and Lauda, these were Rosberg's teammate Jacques Laffite, whose presence in fourth was a surprise given his 18th place grid slot. Ferrari had a difficult race and had a best finish of only fifth with Patrick Tambay, who had started third. The final point went to Marc Surer, who had qualified 20th but moved up to 14th by the end of the first lap. Renault had a tough day in Rio. Still racing an updated version of their 1981/1982 car until the new car would appear in Long Beach for Alain Prost, who started on the front row in Rio but could not sustain pace and finished a lap down in seventh while new teammate Eddie Cheever started in eighth place in his first factory drive but retired from the race on lap 42 with brake failure.

==== Race 2: United States West ====
The next race was the first of two to be held in the US, the United States Grand Prix West, held at Long Beach, California. Tambay started the race from pole, and led until lap 25. On that lap, Rosberg attempted to overtake, but the two cars touched and span. Tambay retired, but Rosberg continued in the lead. Soon afterwards, Laffite took the lead, pushing Rosberg into a collision as he did so. The McLaren pair of John Watson and Niki Lauda had started from 22nd and 23rd on the grid, but both Laffite and Patrese were struggling with worn tyres, and were being caught quickly by the McLarens. Patrese attempted to pass Laffite on lap 44 but slid wide, and was passed by both McLarens. They also both found a way past Laffite on the next lap. From there Watson was left to lead home his teammate for a 1–2 victory, and one that still stands as the victory from the lowest qualifying position. Patrese suffered an engine failure three laps from the end, leaving third position to Arnoux, with Laffite following home, a lap down in fourth. The points were rounded out by Surer in the Arrows and Johnny Cecotto in the Theodore. Chico Serra had been replaced in the second Arrows by 1980 World Champion Alan Jones, but the Australian's return to F1 was unsuccessful, and Serra would be back in the car for the next race.

This was the last United States Grand Prix West, as race organiser Chris Pook had decided that Formula One was too expensive. From 1984 onwards, the race would instead be part of the CART IndyCar series.

=== European spring ===
As the F1 circus headed to Europe, Lauda led the championship despite not having yet won a race. The two winners, Piquet and Watson, were joint second, just one point behind. This meant that McLaren held a commanding lead in the Constructors' Championship, ten points ahead of Brabham.

==== Race 3: France ====
For the French Grand Prix at the Circuit Paul Ricard near Marseille, the RAM team entered a second car for local driver Jean-Louis Schlesser, who failed to qualify.

This race was being held in mid-April instead of its usual late June/early July date, in order to avoid the southern French summer heat. The race was dominated by another home driver, Alain Prost. He took pole position, victory and fastest lap and led all but three laps of the race. These three were led by Piquet during the pit stops; the Brazilian eventually finished second to reclaim his championship lead. Eddie Cheever came home third in the second Renault. Tambay was fourth in front of his home crowd, with the two Williams of Rosberg and Laffite fifth and sixth respectively.

Piquet now led the championship by five points from Lauda, with Watson and Prost just one further point behind. McLaren's lead in the Constructors' Championship had been severely narrowed by their failure to score, and Brabham were now just four points behind, with Renault also in close attendance.

==== Race 4: San Marino ====
Arnoux on Ferrari took the pole position, while his teammate Tambay surged up from the second row to join him at the head of the pack in the opening laps. Local driver Riccardo Patrese, however, overcame them both to put his Brabham in the lead. Despite the best efforts of first Arnoux and then Tambay after they swapped places during the pitstops, he stayed there. On lap 34, Tambay finally found a way past, and he remained in the lead until a small misfire allowed Patrese to take the lead 6 laps from the end on the approach to Tosa. However, on the exit to Aqua Minerale Patrese ran wide and ran into the tyre wall. This allowed Tambay to retake the lead and take the chequered flag, giving Ferrari a win on home ground. Prost passed Arnoux in the last five laps to prevent a Ferrari 1–2 finish. Arnoux came home third, however, to make it an all-French podium, leading home the last points scorers: Rosberg, Watson and Surer yet again. Piquet's failure to score due to an engine failure, a common occurrence for the Brabham-BMWs, meant that he and Prost were now tied at the top of the standings with Tambay only one point behind. The McLaren pair of Watson and Lauda were also in close attendance. Ferrari seized the lead in the Constructors' Championship, but were only separated from McLaren and Renault by a total of three points. Brabham's inconsistency saw them slip to fourth, some way behind.

==== Race 5: Monaco ====
Prost took his second pole of the year in Monaco. Arnoux completed an all French front row. However, both were passed at the start by Keke Rosberg who, despite the damp track, took the gamble of starting on slicks while those around him were either on full wets or intermediate tyres, and as Prost dropped back through the field after a few laps the Finn was left with no serious challengers. Despite the rain, and multiple collisions further down the field, including Arnoux, Rosberg led every lap to record his first victory of the year. Jacques Laffite had looked set to record a Williams 1–2, but he was stopped by a gearbox failure. This gave the two remaining podium spots to Piquet and Prost, allowing Piquet to open up a two-point lead in the championship. Tambay was fourth, ahead of Danny Sullivan's Tyrrell and Mauro Baldi's Alfa Romeo. Patrese suffered from an electrics problem ten laps from home.

Prost remained second in the championship, with Tambay only two further points behind. Rosberg's victory moved him up to fourth, while Ferrari retained their lead in the Constructors' Championship, two points ahead of Renault, who were, in turn, two points ahead of Brabham, McLaren and Williams, all on 21.

==== Race 6: Belgium ====
The 1983 race was, for Spa-Francorchamps circuit in southern Belgium, the first time it had hosted a Grand Prix since 1970; although the circuit had been shortened in 1979 to 7 km from 14 km, and had been made a lot safer than its extremely fast original version but had still managed to retain the fast, flowing nature of the old circuit. Zolder and Nivelles had hosted the Belgian Grand Prix for most of the 1970s and early 1980s.

Prost took pole yet again at Spa for the Belgian Grand Prix, although his qualifying performances were not reflected in his points tally at that point in the season. Andrea de Cesaris leapt into the lead from the second row of the grid, and spent the first twenty laps pulling away from Prost. The Italian looked set for a maiden victory before a slow pit stop dropped him to second and engine trouble slowed and finally stopped his Alfa Romeo. This left Prost free to record a victory only briefly challenged by Piquet, who slipped away at the end to fourth. Tambay was second with Cheever third, making it two Renaults on the podium again, while Rosberg and Laffite rounded out the points, their Cosworth powered cars proving no match for the turbo's on the fast Spa layout.

Prost had a four-point lead over Piquet, with Tambay only one further point behind. Renault also assumed the lead in the Constructors' Championship by five points from Ferrari, with Brabham, Williams and McLaren slipping farther behind. Arrows, seemingly determined to get rid of Chico Serra, replaced him for a second time, this time with local rookie Thierry Boutsen. The Belgian, more known at that point for driving sportscars, kept his drive for the rest of the season.

=== North American tour ===
==== Race 7: Detroit ====
The teams then travelled to Detroit for their customary mid-season visit to North America. The Detroit street circuit had been changed slightly from the previous year's race; a hairpin on Jefferson Avenue and Chrysler Drive had been bypassed and eliminated, so that the course stayed on Chrysler Drive up until it turned left onto Congress Street.

Arnoux scored his second pole of the year, but Piquet took the lead at the start. Arnoux retook the lead on lap 9, and held off both Piquet and Rosberg until the electrics failed on his Ferrari, leaving Piquet back in the lead again. Michele Alboreto's Tyrrell inherited Piquet's lead when the Brazilian developed a slow rear puncture, dropping him to fourth. This was Alboreto's second career victory, both of which had come in the United States. Rosberg came home second with Watson third, while Piquet recovered to finish fourth. Laffite was fifth and Nigel Mansell came home sixth to score Lotus's first point of 1983. Prost's failure to score left him just one point ahead of Piquet with Tambay and Rosberg both in close attendance. Renault's lead in the Constructors' Championship was reduced to four points, with Williams moving into second, one point ahead of Ferrari.

==== Race 8: Canada ====
The Canadian Grand Prix at the Circuit Gilles Villeneuve in Montreal a week after Detroit saw the debut of Jacques Villeneuve, brother of the late Gilles Villeneuve. He was given a debut by RAM at his home Grand Prix, replacing Eliseo Salazar. He failed to qualify for the race. Arnoux took pole again and led for most of the race, his lead only being surrendered during the pit stops. He became the year's seventh victor in eight races as he won for Ferrari for the first time. Patrese had looked set for second before yet another technical failure, this time a gearbox failure, saw him continue to fail to score points in 1983. This left Cheever free to come home second, his best result of the year, with Tambay putting the second Ferrari on the podium in third place. Rosberg, Prost and Watson rounded out the points. Prost held on to his championship lead, now just three points, with Tambay and Piquet joint second. Rosberg was just two farther points behind. Renault and Ferrari now held a joint lead in the Constructors' Championship, with Williams, Brabham and McLaren all slipping off the pace.

=== European summer ===
==== Race 9: Britain ====
The teams returned to Europe for the British Grand Prix at Silverstone, the fastest circuit of the year. Although Salazar had been expected to return to the RAM in place of Villeneuve, British driver Kenny Acheson was hired instead. He performed well enough to retain the seat for the rest of the season. The race also saw the debut of the Honda-funded Spirit team. The team would run a limited programme in 1983 with a view to running a full season in 1984. Stefan Johansson would drive the car. For qualifying Arnoux took his third successive pole position in the brand new Ferrari 126C3. He lost the lead to his teammate Tambay at the start and held second ahead of Prost. Although the Ferraris had a straight-line speed advantage over the Renault, overall Prost was the fastest of the three, and he passed both Arnoux and Tambay by lap 20. But for pit stops, he remained in the lead until the finish. Piquet also overcame the Ferraris before the end to finish second, with Tambay in third. Mansell, with Renault turbo power for the first time in his Lotus, took his best result of the year to be the highest home driver in fourth ahead of Arnoux and Lauda. This allowed both Prost and Renault to extend their championship leads. Piquet was now six points behind, with Tambay two points further back. Rosberg was now more than a victory behind and it was clear that teams without turbo power such as Williams, McLaren, Tyrrell and Ligier were at a significant disadvantage. The Constructors' Championship was becoming a two-horse race, with Renault leading Ferrari by three points.

==== Race 10: West Germany ====
The next race was the German Grand Prix at the very fast Hockenheim circuit near Stuttgart, and Tambay secured Ferrari's fourth consecutive pole position. He lost the lead to Arnoux early on, however, and later suffered an engine failure to promote Piquet to second. The Brazilian inherited the lead briefly during Arnoux's pit stop, but the Frenchman could not be stopped and recorded his second victory of the year. A fire three laps from home prevented Piquet from picking up second, which instead went to Andrea de Cesaris, collecting some points for Alfa Romeo. Patrese was third, scoring his first points of the year ahead of Prost, Lauda and Watson.

Prost extended his points lead to nine points over Piquet, but both Tambay and Arnoux were nearing. Ferrari also reassumed their points lead, three ahead of Renault.

==== Race 11: Austria ====
It was another pole for Tambay and Ferrari in Austria at the fast Österreichring circuit near Graz. He led until the first pit stops, when low oil pressure forced his retirement. This should have allowed teammate Arnoux to pick up the victory, but he was passed by Prost in the closing stages. Piquet finished third with Cheever fourth, Mansell fifth and Lauda rounding out the points. Prost now held a 14-point lead over Piquet, 51 points to 37, with Arnoux on 34 and Tambay on 31. Renault went back into the lead of the Constructors' Championship, three points ahead of Ferrari.

==== Race 12: Netherlands ====
Piquet took his first pole of the season at the Dutch Grand Prix at the Zandvoort circuit near Amsterdam, and led until lap 41, when Prost attempted to pass him. The two collided, and both were out on the spot. This left Arnoux to take victory for Ferrari, which turned into a 1–2 when Patrese suffered a problem near the end which dropped him to an eventual ninth. John Watson was third. A race of high attrition allowed for an unusual top six, with Derek Warwick, Mauro Baldi and Michele Alboreto rounding out the points. Johansson came home seventh for the new Spirit team. Arnoux now moved into second in the championship, eight points behind Prost. Tambay and Piquet were now joint third, 14 points behind the leader. Ferrari's lead in the Constructors' Championship, however, was now 12 points over Renault. Piquet's pole ended a run of ten consecutive pole positions by French drivers. This race saw McLaren join the turbo ranks when Lauda debuted the new TAG V6 engine, though Watson still drove the Cosworth-powered car.

==== Race 13: Italy ====
With three races left to run, the teams headed to Italy in early September. The Monza Autodrome near Milan, saw the Ferrari lose pole to Patrese, placing second and third. Piquet jumped both Ferraris to run second behind his teammate in the opening laps, but it did not last long, as electric problems forced Patrese to retire on lap 3. Piquet was then unchallenged for the rest of the race, and came home to record his first victory since the opening race in Brazil, some six months before. Arnoux took second with Cheever third and Tambay fourth. Elio de Angelis scored his first points of the year with fifth, with Derek Warwick scoring points for the second time in a row in sixth. The performances of Piquet and Arnoux, coupled with Prost's failure to score, left the championship in an uncertain position with two races left. Prost still led with 51, Arnoux had 49, Piquet 46 and Tambay 40 with 18 points left on the board. Ferrari maintained their lead, now with 17 points back to Renault.

==== Race 14: Europe (Brands Hatch, UK) ====
A third Grand Prix in the United States was supposed to be held at the Flushing Meadows–Corona Park in the New York City borough of Queens, but was canceled at short notice due to local protests. The British Brands Hatch circuit, just outside London, was able to organise a European Grand Prix in its place. Theodore travelled to the race with just one car, having insufficient funds for Johnny Cecotto to compete in the last two races. After the race, the team folded completely, and did not appear at all at the last race. The Spirit team also announced they would not travel to the last race, in preparation for their first full season in 1984. Williams had run a third car in the Brands Hatch race, for Jonathan Palmer. The British driver finished 13th, the only Williams to finish after Rosberg retired with an engine failure and Laffite failed to qualify.

The race saw de Angelis take the pole position for Lotus. The Italian was overtaken at the start by compatriot Patrese, who led until the first pit stops. After this, he slipped away from the pace, and an engine failure for de Angelis gave the lead to Piquet. He led until the finish, becoming the first driver all season to win two consecutive races. Prost fought through for second, with Mansell taking Lotus's first podium of the year with third. De Cesaris was fourth, while Toleman had both cars in the points, with Warwick ahead of Bruno Giacomelli.

The race left both championships in the balance with one race left. Prost still led, but now by only two points above Piquet. Arnoux could also be champion, but it would require him to win with Prost not scoring and Piquet no higher than fifth. Renault were still 11 points behind Ferrari.

=== Season finale: South Africa ===
The season finale was the South African Grand Prix at the fast, high-altitude Kyalami circuit between Johannesburg and Pretoria. Tambay took pole with Piquet, the best-positioned of the title contenders, in second. Arnoux was fourth with Prost fifth. If the race finished like that, Piquet would be champion. Piquet assumed the lead at the start to further enhance his chances. Prost fought his way up to third, while an early engine failure for Arnoux put him out of the running. With Prost in third and Patrese in second, Piquet's teammate kept Prost behind him. However, when Prost's turbo failed on lap 44, Piquet needed only to finish in the top four. He backed off, and eventually surrendered the lead to Patrese, who became the season's eighth winner. Piquet also allowed Lauda through into second place, but the Austrian's electrics failed three laps later. De Cesaris also passed Piquet before the end, securing his second podium of the year for Alfa Romeo. Third for Piquet was enough to secure him his second world championship, while Warwick once again finished in the points for Toleman in fourth. Rosberg and Cheever rounded out the points. Only two points separated Piquet and Prost at the end, the Frenchman having led in the title race for most of the season. Renault also lost the Constructors' Championship, with Ferrari securing the title for the second year in succession.

== Results and standings ==
=== Grands Prix ===
Round	Grand Prix	Pole position	Fastest lap	Winning driver	Winning constructor	Report
1	(Brazil) Brazilian Grand Prix	(Finland) Keke Rosberg	(Brazil) Nelson Piquet	(Brazil) Nelson Piquet	(United Kingdom) Brabham-BMW	Report
2	United States Grand Prix West	(France) Patrick Tambay	(Austria) Niki Lauda	(United Kingdom) John Watson	(United Kingdom) McLaren-Ford	Report
3	(France) French Grand Prix	(France) Alain Prost	(France) Alain Prost	(France) Alain Prost	(France) Renault	Report
4	(Italy) San Marino Grand Prix	(France) René Arnoux	(Italy) Riccardo Patrese	(France) Patrick Tambay	(Italy) Ferrari	Report
5	Monaco Grand Prix	(France) Alain Prost	(Brazil) Nelson Piquet	(Finland) Keke Rosberg	(United Kingdom) Williams-Ford	Report
6	(Belgium) Belgian Grand Prix	(France) Alain Prost	(Italy) Andrea de Cesaris	(France) Alain Prost	(France) Renault	Report
7	(United States) Detroit Grand Prix	(France) René Arnoux	(United Kingdom) John Watson	(Italy) Michele Alboreto	(United Kingdom) Tyrrell-Ford	Report
8	(Canada) Canadian Grand Prix	(France) René Arnoux	(France) Patrick Tambay	(France) René Arnoux	(Italy) Ferrari	Report
9	(United Kingdom) British Grand Prix	(France) René Arnoux	(France) Alain Prost	(France) Alain Prost	(France) Renault	Report
10	(West Germany) German Grand Prix	(France) Patrick Tambay	(France) René Arnoux	(France) René Arnoux	(Italy) Ferrari	Report
11	(Austria) Austrian Grand Prix	(France) Patrick Tambay	(France) Alain Prost	(France) Alain Prost	(France) Renault	Report
12	(Netherlands) Dutch Grand Prix	(Brazil) Nelson Piquet	(France) René Arnoux	(France) René Arnoux	(Italy) Ferrari	Report
13	(Italy) Italian Grand Prix	(Italy) Riccardo Patrese	(Brazil) Nelson Piquet	(Brazil) Nelson Piquet	(United Kingdom) Brabham-BMW	Report
14	(United Kingdom) European Grand Prix	(Italy) Elio de Angelis	(United Kingdom) Nigel Mansell	(Brazil) Nelson Piquet	(United Kingdom) Brabham-BMW	Report
15	(South Africa) South African Grand Prix	(France) Patrick Tambay	(Brazil) Nelson Piquet	(Italy) Riccardo Patrese	(United Kingdom) Brabham-BMW	Report

=== Scoring system ===
Points were awarded to the top six classified finishers. For the Drivers' Championship, the best eleven results were counted, while, for the Constructors' Championship, all rounds were counted.

No driver classified in more than eleven points-scoring positions, so no drop-rounds applied for this season. Points were awarded in the following system:

Position	1st	2nd	3rd	4th	5th	6th
Race	9	6	4	3	2	1

=== World Drivers' Championship standings ===
Pos	Driver	BRA (Brazil)	USW (United States)	FRA (France)	SMR (Italy)	MON (Monaco)	BEL (Belgium)	DET (United States)	CAN (Canada)	GBR (United Kingdom)	GER (West Germany)	AUT (Austria)	NED (Netherlands)	ITA (Italy)	EUR (United Kingdom)	RSA (South Africa)	Points
1	(Brazil) Nelson Piquet	1^{F}	Ret	2	Ret	2^{F}	4	4	Ret	2	13	3	Ret^{P}	1^{F}	1	3^{F}	59
2	(France) Alain Prost	7	11	1^{P}^{F}	2	3^{P}	1^{P}	8	5	1^{F}	4	1^{F}	Ret	Ret	2	Ret	57
3	(France) René Arnoux	10	3	7	3^{P}	Ret	Ret	Ret^{P}	1^{P}	5^{P}	1^{F}	2	1^{F}	2	9	Ret	49
4	(France) Patrick Tambay	5	Ret^{P}	4	1	4	2	Ret	3^{F}	3	Ret^{P}	Ret^{P}	2	4	Ret	Ret^{P}	40
5	(Finland) Keke Rosberg	DSQ^{P}	Ret	5	4	1	5	2	4	11	10	8	Ret	11	Ret	5	27
6	(United Kingdom) John Watson	Ret	1	Ret	5	DNQ	Ret	3^{F}	6	9	5	9	3	Ret	Ret	DSQ	22
7	(United States) Eddie Cheever	Ret	13	3	Ret	Ret	3	Ret	2	Ret	Ret	4	Ret	3	10	6	22
8	(Italy) Andrea de Cesaris	EX	Ret	12	Ret	Ret	Ret^{F}	Ret	Ret	8	2	Ret	Ret	Ret	4	2	15
9	(Italy) Riccardo Patrese	Ret	10	Ret	Ret^{F}	Ret	Ret	Ret	Ret	Ret	3	Ret	9	Ret^{P}	7	1	13
10	(Austria) Niki Lauda	3	2^{F}	Ret	Ret	DNQ	Ret	Ret	Ret	6	DSQ	6	Ret	Ret	Ret	11	12
11	(France) Jacques Laffite	4	4	6	7	Ret	6	5	Ret	12	6	Ret	Ret	DNQ	DNQ	Ret	11
12	(Italy) Michele Alboreto	Ret	9	8	Ret	Ret	14	1	8	13	Ret	Ret	6	Ret	Ret	Ret	10
13	(United Kingdom) Nigel Mansell	12	12	Ret	12	Ret	Ret	6	Ret	4	Ret	5	Ret	8	3^{F}	NC	10
14	(United Kingdom) Derek Warwick	8	Ret	Ret	Ret	Ret	7	Ret	Ret	Ret	Ret	Ret	4	6	5	4	9
15	(Switzerland) Marc Surer	6	5	10	6	Ret	11	11	Ret	17	7	Ret	8	10	Ret	8	4
16	(Italy) Mauro Baldi	Ret	Ret	Ret	10	6	Ret	12	10	7	Ret	Ret	5	Ret	Ret	Ret	3
17	(United States) Danny Sullivan	11	8	Ret	Ret	5	12	Ret	DSQ	14	12	Ret	Ret	Ret	Ret	7	2
=	(Italy) Elio de Angelis	DSQ	Ret	Ret	Ret	Ret	9	Ret	Ret	Ret	Ret	Ret	Ret	5	Ret^{P}	Ret	2
19	(Venezuela) Johnny Cecotto	13	6	11	Ret	DNPQ	10	Ret	Ret	DNQ	11	DNQ	DNQ	12			1
=	(Italy) Bruno Giacomelli	Ret	Ret	13	Ret	DNQ	8	9	Ret	Ret	Ret	Ret	13	7	6	Ret	1
—	(Belgium) Thierry Boutsen						Ret	7	7	15	9	13	14	Ret	11	9	0
—	(France) Jean-Pierre Jarier	Ret	Ret	9	Ret	Ret	Ret	Ret	Ret	10	8	7	Ret	9	Ret	10	0
—	(Brazil) Chico Serra	9		Ret	8	7											0
—	(Brazil) Raul Boesel	Ret	7	Ret	9	Ret	13	10	Ret	Ret	Ret	DNQ	10	DNQ	15	NC	0
—	(Sweden) Stefan Johansson									Ret	Ret	12	7	Ret	14		0
—	(West Germany) Manfred Winkelhock	15	Ret	Ret	11	Ret	Ret	Ret	9	Ret	DNQ	Ret	DSQ	Ret	8	Ret	0
—	(Italy) Corrado Fabi	Ret	DNQ	Ret	Ret	DNQ	Ret	DNQ	Ret	DNQ	DNQ	10	11	Ret	DNQ	Ret	0
—	(Italy) Piercarlo Ghinzani	DNQ	DNQ	DNQ	DNQ	DNQ	DNQ	Ret	DNQ	Ret	Ret	11	DNQ	Ret	Ret	Ret	0
—	(Colombia) Roberto Guerrero	NC	Ret	Ret	Ret	DNPQ	Ret	NC	Ret	16	Ret	Ret	12	13	12		0
—	(United Kingdom) Kenny Acheson									DNQ	DNQ	DNQ	DNQ	DNQ	DNQ	12	0
—	(United Kingdom) Jonathan Palmer														13		0
—	(Chile) Eliseo Salazar	14	Ret	DNQ	DNQ	DNQ	DNQ										0
—	(Australia) Alan Jones		Ret														0
—	(France) Jean-Louis Schlesser			DNQ													0
—	(Canada) Jacques Villeneuve Sr.								DNQ								0
Pos	Driver	BRA (Brazil)	USW (United States)	FRA (France)	SMR (Italy)	MON (Monaco)	BEL (Belgium)	DET (United States)	CAN (Canada)	GBR (United Kingdom)	GER (West Germany)	AUT (Austria)	NED (Netherlands)	ITA (Italy)	EUR (United Kingdom)	RSA (South Africa)	Points

Key
Colour	Result
Gold	Winner
Silver	Second place
Bronze	Third place
Green	Other points position
Blue	Other classified position
Blue	Not classified, finished (NC)
Purple	Not classified, retired (Ret)
Red	Did not qualify (DNQ)
Black	Disqualified (DSQ)
White	Did not start (DNS)
White	Race cancelled (C)
Blank	Did not practice (DNP)
Blank	Excluded (EX)
Blank	Did not arrive (DNA)
Blank	Withdrawn (WD)
Blank	Did not enter (empty cell)
Annotation	Meaning
P	Pole position
F	Fastest lap

=== World Constructors' Championship standings ===
Pos	Constructor	Car no.	BRA (Brazil)	USW (United States)	FRA (France)	SMR (Italy)	MON (Monaco)	BEL (Belgium)	DET (United States)	CAN (Canada)	GBR (United Kingdom)	GER (West Germany)	AUT (Austria)	NED (Netherlands)	ITA (Italy)	EUR (United Kingdom)	RSA (South Africa)	Points
1	(Italy) Ferrari	27	5	Ret	4	1	4	2	Ret	3	3	Ret	Ret	2	4	Ret	Ret	89
1	(Italy) Ferrari	28	10	3	7	3	Ret	Ret	Ret	1	5	1	2	1	2	9	Ret	89
2	(France) Renault	15	7	11	1	2	3	1	8	5	1	4	1	Ret	Ret	2	Ret	79
2	(France) Renault	16	Ret	13	3	Ret	Ret	3	Ret	2	Ret	Ret	4	Ret	3	10	6	79
3	(United Kingdom) Brabham-BMW	5	1	Ret	2	Ret	2	4	4	Ret	2	13	3	Ret	1	1	3	72
3	(United Kingdom) Brabham-BMW	6	Ret	10	Ret	Ret	Ret	Ret	Ret	Ret	Ret	3	Ret	9	Ret	7	1	72
4	(United Kingdom) Williams-Ford	1	DSQ	Ret	5	4	1	5	2	4	11	10	8	Ret	11	Ret		36
4	(United Kingdom) Williams-Ford	2	4	4	6	7	Ret	6	5	Ret	12	6	Ret	Ret	DNQ	DNQ		36
4	(United Kingdom) Williams-Ford	42														13		36
5	(United Kingdom) McLaren-Ford	7	Ret	1	Ret	5	DNQ	Ret	3	6	9	5	9	3				34
5	(United Kingdom) McLaren-Ford	8	3	2	Ret	Ret	DNQ	Ret	Ret	Ret	6	DSQ	6					34
6	(Italy) Alfa Romeo	22	EX	Ret	12	Ret	Ret	Ret	Ret	Ret	8	2	Ret	Ret	Ret	4	2	18
6	(Italy) Alfa Romeo	23	Ret	Ret	Ret	10	6	Ret	12	10	7	Ret	Ret	5	Ret	Ret	Ret	18
7	(United Kingdom) Tyrrell-Ford	3	Ret	9	8	Ret	Ret	14	1	8	13	Ret	Ret	6	Ret	Ret	Ret	12
7	(United Kingdom) Tyrrell-Ford	4	11	8	Ret	Ret	5	12	Ret	DSQ	14	12	Ret	Ret	Ret	Ret	7	12
8	(United Kingdom) Lotus-Renault	11		Ret	Ret	Ret	Ret	9	Ret	Ret	Ret	Ret	Ret	Ret	5	Ret	Ret	11
8	(United Kingdom) Lotus-Renault	12									4	Ret	5	Ret	8	3	NC	11
9	(United Kingdom) Toleman-Hart	35	8	Ret	Ret	Ret	Ret	7	Ret	Ret	Ret	Ret	Ret	4	6	5	4	10
9	(United Kingdom) Toleman-Hart	36	Ret	Ret	13	Ret	DNQ	8	9	Ret	Ret	Ret	Ret	13	7	6	Ret	10
10	(United Kingdom) Arrows-Ford	29	6	5	10	6	Ret	11	11	Ret	17	7	Ret	8	10	Ret	8	4
10	(United Kingdom) Arrows-Ford	30	9	Ret	Ret	8	7	Ret	7	7	15	9	13	14	Ret	11	9	4
11	(United Kingdom) Williams-Honda	1															5	2
11	(United Kingdom) Williams-Honda	2															Ret	2
12	(Hong Kong) Theodore-Ford	33	NC	Ret	Ret	Ret	DNPQ	Ret	NC	Ret	16	Ret	Ret	12	13	12		1
12	(Hong Kong) Theodore-Ford	34	13	6	11	Ret	DNPQ	10	Ret	Ret	DNQ	11	DNQ	DNQ	12			1
=	(United Kingdom) Lotus-Ford	11	DSQ															1
=	(United Kingdom) Lotus-Ford	12	12	12	Ret	12	Ret	Ret	6	Ret								1
—	(France) Ligier-Ford	25	Ret	Ret	9	Ret	Ret	Ret	Ret	Ret	10	8	7	Ret	9	Ret	10	0
—	(France) Ligier-Ford	26	Ret	7	Ret	9	Ret	13	10	Ret	Ret	Ret	DNQ	10	DNQ	15	NC	0
—	(United Kingdom) Spirit-Honda	40									Ret	Ret	12	7	Ret	14		0
—	(West Germany) ATS-BMW	9	15	Ret	Ret	11	Ret	Ret	Ret	9	Ret	DNQ	Ret	DSQ	Ret	8	Ret	0
—	(Italy) Osella-Alfa Romeo	31									DNQ	DNQ	10	11	Ret	DNQ	Ret	0
—	(Italy) Osella-Alfa Romeo	32				DNQ	DNQ	DNQ	Ret	DNQ	Ret	Ret	11	DNQ	Ret	Ret	Ret	0
—	(United Kingdom) McLaren-TAG	7													Ret	Ret	DSQ	0
—	(United Kingdom) McLaren-TAG	8												Ret	Ret	Ret	11	0
—	(United Kingdom) RAM-Ford	17	14	Ret	DNQ	DNQ	DNQ	DNQ		DNQ	DNQ	DNQ	DNQ	DNQ	DNQ	DNQ	12	0
—	(United Kingdom) RAM-Ford	18			DNQ													0
—	(Italy) Osella-Ford	31	Ret	DNQ	Ret	Ret	DNQ	Ret	DNQ	Ret								0
—	(Italy) Osella-Ford	32	DNQ	DNQ	DNQ													0
Pos	Constructor	Car no.	BRA (Brazil)	USW (United States)	FRA (France)	SMR (Italy)	MON (Monaco)	BEL (Belgium)	DET (United States)	CAN (Canada)	GBR (United Kingdom)	GER (West Germany)	AUT (Austria)	NED (Netherlands)	ITA (Italy)	EUR (United Kingdom)	RSA (South Africa)	Points

== Non-championship race ==
The 1983 season also included a single race which did not count towards the World Championship, the 1983 Race of Champions. This remains the most recent non-championship Formula One race.

Race name	Circuit	Date	Winning driver	Constructor	Report
(United Kingdom) Race of Champions	Brands Hatch	10 April	(Finland) Keke Rosberg	(United Kingdom) Williams-Ford	Report
