= 1983 Detroit Grand Prix =

- Race 7 of 15 in the 1983 Formula One World Championship

Race details
- Date: June 5, 1983
- Official name: 2nd Detroit Grand Prix
- Location: Detroit Street Circuit; Detroit, Michigan
- Course: Temporary street course
- Course length: 4.120 km (2.56 miles)
- Distance: 60 laps, 247.195 km (153.60 miles)
- Weather: Sunny and warm with temperatures reaching up to 76.8 °F (24.9 °C); wind speeds up to 11.3 miles per hour (18.2 km/h)

Pole position
| Driver | (France) René Arnoux | Ferrari |
- Time: 1:44.734

Fastest lap
| Driver | (United Kingdom) John Watson | McLaren-Ford |
- Time: 1:47.668 on lap 55

Podium
| First | (Italy) Michele Alboreto | Tyrrell-Ford |
| Second | (Finland) Keke Rosberg | Williams-Ford |
| Third | (United Kingdom) John Watson | McLaren-Ford |

The 1983 Detroit Grand Prix was a Formula One motor race held in Detroit, Michigan on June 5, 1983. It was the seventh race of the 1983 Formula One World Championship, and the second Formula One race to be held in Detroit.

== Summary ==
=== Circuit changes ===
After the previous year's race had failed to come close to the typical Grand Prix distance of 305 km in the 2 hour time limit, the race distance was shortened to 61 laps (about 250 km). The circuit had been slightly modified from its original configuration the year before, with the pit lane extended to place the entrance before the final chicane, and a short new section of track eliminating the extremely tight hairpin at Turn Five. The new layout was faster and much preferred by the drivers. Friday's entire agenda was run in the rain, however, and it was left to a single hour on Saturday to decide the starting grid.

=== Qualifying ===
Contrary to the usual pattern, after the first fifteen minutes or so of qualifying, the track became slower as more rubber was laid down. This was apparently due to moisture still in the track being drawn out by the now-present sunshine. The pole-winning time of 1:44.734 was posted by René Arnoux on his Ferrari's first set of qualifying tires; on his second set, he was more than two seconds slower. Many who did not record a quick time early in the session were caught out by the changing conditions, and the grid held many surprises as a result. Defending Champion Keke Rosberg was twelfth, Alain Prost thirteenth and Niki Lauda eighteenth, while the non-turbocharged cars of Marc Surer and Alboreto were fifth and sixth. American Eddie Cheever, in the only competitive ride of his F1 career with Renault, was in seventh spot, six places ahead of his highly regarded teammate.

=== Race ===
Over 70,000 fans enjoyed beautiful weather for the race on Sunday. The boats on the Detroit River, the blaring music and the floods of people from the downtown hotels created quite an atmosphere, inevitably bringing comparisons to Monaco, as the Long Beach event often did.

The first attempt at a start was halted just as the green light was about to come on, when Andrea de Cesaris signalled from the grid that his Alfa Romeo had stalled. The whole process was begun again, with another pace lap that reduced the race distance from 61 laps to 60, and this time the green light came on. This time, however, Patrick Tambay's Ferrari, in the second row, stalled on the grid. He held his breath while everyone made their way safely around him, and then, expecting a push-start, instead was removed from the circuit by tow truck.

Piquet made an excellent start and beat Arnoux to Turn One. He led after the first lap, with Arnoux ahead of de Angelis, de Cesaris, Alboreto, Derek Warwick, Rosberg (already up from twelfth) and Cheever. The two leaders quickly began to separate themselves from the rest, while a four-way nose-to-tail battle raged for fourth. On lap five, Cheever retired with ignition failure, de Angelis forfeited third place with a broken gearbox and Piercarlo Ghinzani abandoned his Osella in the pits with an overheating engine.

Arnoux, after steadily closing the gap to Piquet, overtook the Brabham into Turn One and gained the lead on lap 10. Piquet let him through without a fight, knowing that the Ferrari was planning a fuel and tire stop, while he was not. When Rosberg finally got by de Cesaris for third at the end of lap 11, he was almost 15 seconds behind Piquet, but clearly faster. Alboreto, in fifth place and also threatening de Cesaris, had started on full tanks and, like Piquet, was not planning a pit stop.

By lap 20, Rosberg had caught up with Piquet's Brabham and easily went by to take second, about twenty seconds behind Arnoux. On lap 29, the Ferrari's lead was up to almost 30 seconds when Arnoux came into the pits, as expected, followed soon after by Rosberg's Williams, whose intentions had been unclear. Arnoux rejoined after a stop of just 13.5 seconds, still barely in the lead; by the time Rosberg was able to get back on the track (his stop lasted 17.5 seconds), he was in fifth place behind Piquet, Alboreto and Jacques Laffite, none of whom had stopped. But just three laps after his pit stop, Arnoux suddenly coasted to a halt on the circuit with an electrical failure.

When Laffite pitted, Piquet was back in the lead, with Alboreto up to second and Rosberg third, 25 seconds back. John Watson, having started in 21st position on the grid, was now in fourth, making his regular charge through an American Grand Prix field. It looked as if Nelson Piquet and Brabham-BMW were on their way to victory as Alboreto was doing all he could to stay close. Suddenly, on lap 51, Piquet slowed with a punctured left rear tire, and as he made his way back to the pits, Alboreto and Rosberg went by. While he was in the pits, Watson also came through. All that was left was for Alboreto to bring the Tyrrell home over the final nine laps, taking it rather easy since he was too far in front for Rosberg to catch him. Watson, meanwhile, was doing anything but taking it easy, and he set the race's fastest lap (1.6 seconds faster than his qualifying time) while just failing to catch the Williams for second place. Piquet rejoined to finish in fourth, ahead of Laffite in the second Williams and Nigel Mansell's Lotus.

Alboreto's teammate, American Danny Sullivan, in his only season of Formula One, retired at the halfway point of the race when his engine failed. His only points for the season came from his fifth place at Monaco, though he did finish second at the non-Championship Race of Champions at Brands Hatch. When Sullivan could not secure a drive with turbo power for 1984, he saw the writing on the wall and returned to the US and the CART Indy Car series.

Tyrrell's Michele Alboreto scored his second Grand Prix win and first points of the season. The tight downtown street course took away much of the advantage of the turbocharged cars, and Alboreto's win for Cosworth-Ford was the last of the season's three non-turbo victories. It was also the last for a normally aspirated engine until the turbos were outlawed after the 1988 season, and the last of a record 155 wins for the legendary Cosworth DFV and also the last victory for the Tyrrell team.

== Classification ==
=== Qualifying ===
| Pos | No | Driver | Constructor | Q1 | Q2 | Gap |
|---|---|---|---|---|---|---|
| 1 | 28 | (France) René Arnoux | Ferrari | 2:08.851 | 1:44.734 | — |
| 2 | 5 | (Brazil) Nelson Piquet | Brabham-BMW | 2:11.506 | 1:44.933 | +0.199 |
| 3 | 27 | (France) Patrick Tambay | Ferrari | 2:10.994 | 1:45.991 | +1.257 |
| 4 | 11 | (Italy) Elio de Angelis | Lotus-Renault | 2:09.601 | 1:46.258 | +1.524 |
| 5 | 29 | (Switzerland) Marc Surer | Arrows-Ford | 2:09.292 | 1:46.745 | +2.011 |
| 6 | 3 | (Italy) Michele Alboreto | Tyrrell-Ford | 2:08.198 | 1:47.013 | +2.279 |
| 7 | 16 | (United States) Eddie Cheever | Renault | 2:08.418 | 1:47.334 | +2.600 |
| 8 | 22 | (Italy) Andrea de Cesaris | Alfa Romeo | 2:08.034 | 1:47.453 | +2.719 |
| 9 | 35 | (United Kingdom) Derek Warwick | Toleman-Hart | no time | 1:47.534 | +2.800 |
| 10 | 30 | (Belgium) Thierry Boutsen | Arrows-Ford | 2:11.107 | 1:47.586 | +2.852 |
| 11 | 33 | (Colombia) Roberto Guerrero | Theodore-Ford | 2:08.496 | 1:47.701 | +2.967 |
| 12 | 1 | (Finland) Keke Rosberg | Williams-Ford | 2:06.382 | 1:47.728 | +2.994 |
| 13 | 15 | (France) Alain Prost | Renault | 2:15.731 | 1:47.855 | +3.121 |
| 14 | 12 | (United Kingdom) Nigel Mansell | Lotus-Ford | 2:07.792 | 1:48.395 | +3.661 |
| 15 | 6 | (Italy) Riccardo Patrese | Brabham-BMW | 2:17.489 | 1:48.537 | +3.803 |
| 16 | 4 | (United States) Danny Sullivan | Tyrrell-Ford | 2:18.758 | 1:48.648 | +3.914 |
| 17 | 36 | (Italy) Bruno Giacomelli | Toleman-Hart | 2:13.205 | 1:48.785 | +4.051 |
| 18 | 8 | (Austria) Niki Lauda | McLaren-Ford | 2:09.019 | 1:48.992 | +4.258 |
| 19 | 25 | (France) Jean-Pierre Jarier | Ligier-Ford | 2:07.652 | 1:48.994 | +4.260 |
| 20 | 2 | (France) Jacques Laffite | Williams-Ford | 2:13.080 | 1:49.245 | +4.511 |
| 21 | 7 | (United Kingdom) John Watson | McLaren-Ford | 2:10.632 | 1:49.250 | +4.516 |
| 22 | 9 | (West Germany) Manfred Winkelhock | ATS-BMW | 2:12.092 | 1:49.466 | +4.732 |
| 23 | 26 | (Brazil) Raul Boesel | Ligier-Ford | 2:12.164 | 1:49.540 | +4.806 |
| 24 | 32 | (Italy) Piercarlo Ghinzani | Osella-Alfa Romeo | 2:15.556 | 1:49.885 | +5.151 |
| 25 | 23 | (Italy) Mauro Baldi | Alfa Romeo | 2:11.169 | 1:49.916 | +5.182 |
| 26 | 34 | (Venezuela) Johnny Cecotto | Theodore-Ford | 2:14.547 | 1:51.709 | +6.975 |
| 27‡ | 31 | (Italy) Corrado Fabi | Osella-Ford | 2:15.085 | 1:53.516 | +8.782 |

‡ - Driver failed to qualify for the race.

=== Race ===
| Pos | No | Driver | Constructor | Tyre | Laps | Time/Retired | Grid | Points |
|---|---|---|---|---|---|---|---|---|
| 1 | 3 | (Italy) Michele Alboreto | Tyrrell-Ford | G | 60 | 1:50:53.669 | 6 | 9 |
| 2 | 1 | (Finland) Keke Rosberg | Williams-Ford | G | 60 | + 7.702 | 12 | 6 |
| 3 | 7 | (United Kingdom) John Watson | McLaren-Ford | MI | 60 | + 9.283 | 21 | 4 |
| 4 | 5 | (Brazil) Nelson Piquet | Brabham-BMW | MI | 60 | + 1:12.185 | 2 | 3 |
| 5 | 2 | (France) Jacques Laffite | Williams-Ford | G | 60 | + 1:32.603 | 20 | 2 |
| 6 | 12 | (United Kingdom) Nigel Mansell | Lotus-Ford | P | 59 | + 1 Lap | 14 | 1 |
| 7 | 30 | (Belgium) Thierry Boutsen | Arrows-Ford | G | 59 | + 1 Lap | 10 | |
| 8 | 15 | (France) Alain Prost | Renault | MI | 59 | + 1 Lap | 13 | |
| 9 | 36 | (Italy) Bruno Giacomelli | Toleman-Hart | P | 59 | + 1 Lap | 17 | |
| 10 | 26 | (Brazil) Raul Boesel | Ligier-Ford | MI | 58 | + 2 Laps | 23 | |
| 11 | 29 | (Switzerland) Marc Surer | Arrows-Ford | G | 58 | + 2 Laps | 5 | |
| 12 | 23 | (Italy) Mauro Baldi | Alfa Romeo | MI | 56 | + 4 Laps | 25 | |
| Ret | 8 | (Austria) Niki Lauda | McLaren-Ford | MI | 49 | Suspension | 18 | |
| NC | 33 | (Colombia) Roberto Guerrero | Theodore-Ford | G | 38 | + 22 Laps | 11 | |
| Ret | 34 | (Venezuela) Johnny Cecotto | Theodore-Ford | G | 34 | Gearbox | 26 | |
| Ret | 22 | (Italy) Andrea de Cesaris | Alfa Romeo | MI | 33 | Turbo | 8 | |
| Ret | 28 | (France) René Arnoux | Ferrari | G | 31 | Electrical | 1 | |
| Ret | 4 | (United States) Danny Sullivan | Tyrrell-Ford | G | 30 | Electrical | 16 | |
| Ret | 25 | (France) Jean-Pierre Jarier | Ligier-Ford | MI | 29 | Wheel | 19 | |
| Ret | 9 | (West Germany) Manfred Winkelhock | ATS-BMW | G | 26 | Collision | 22 | |
| Ret | 35 | (United Kingdom) Derek Warwick | Toleman-Hart | P | 25 | Engine | 9 | |
| Ret | 6 | (Italy) Riccardo Patrese | Brabham-BMW | MI | 24 | Brakes | 15 | |
| Ret | 11 | (Italy) Elio de Angelis | Lotus-Renault | P | 5 | Gearbox | 4 | |
| Ret | 16 | (United States) Eddie Cheever | Renault | MI | 4 | Distributor | 7 | |
| Ret | 32 | (Italy) Piercarlo Ghinzani | Osella-Alfa Romeo | MI | 4 | Overheating | 24 | |
| Ret | 27 | (France) Patrick Tambay | Ferrari | G | 0 | Engine | 3 | |

== Championship standings after the race ==
Drivers' Championship standings

| Pos | Driver | Points |
|---|---|---|
| 1 | (France) Alain Prost | 28 |
| 2 | (Brazil) Nelson Piquet | 27 |
| 3 | (France) Patrick Tambay | 23 |
| 4 | (Finland) Keke Rosberg | 22 |
| 5 | (United Kingdom) John Watson | 15 |

Constructors' Championship standings

| Pos | Constructor | Points |
|---|---|---|
| 1 | (France) Renault | 36 |
| 2 | (United Kingdom) Williams-Ford | 32 |
| 3 | (Italy) Ferrari | 31 |
| 4 | (United Kingdom) Brabham-BMW | 27 |
| 5 | (United Kingdom) McLaren-Ford | 25 |

- Note: Only the top five positions are included for both sets of standings.

| Previous race: 1983 Belgian Grand Prix | FIA Formula One World Championship; 1983 season | Next race: 1983 Canadian Grand Prix |
| Previous race: 1982 Detroit Grand Prix | Detroit Grand Prix | Next race: 1984 Detroit Grand Prix |
