= 1983 Canadian Grand Prix =

- Race 8 of 15 in the 1983 Formula One World Championship
- Circuit Gilles Villeneuve

Race details
- Date: 12 June 1983
- Official name: XXII Grand Prix Labatt du Canada
- Location: Circuit Gilles Villeneuve; Montreal, Quebec, Canada
- Course: Temporary street circuit
- Course length: 4.410 km (2.740 miles)
- Distance: 70 laps, 308.700 km (191.817 miles)
- Weather: Warm with temperatures approaching 30 °C (86 °F); wind speeds up to 15 kilometres per hour (9.3 mph)

Pole position
Driver	(France) René Arnoux	Ferrari
- Time: 1:28.729

Fastest lap
Driver	(France) Patrick Tambay	Ferrari
- Time: 1:30.851 on lap 42

Podium
First	(France) René Arnoux	Ferrari
Second	(United States) Eddie Cheever	Renault
Third	(France) Patrick Tambay	Ferrari

The 1983 Canadian Grand Prix was a Formula One motor race held at Circuit Gilles Villeneuve on 12 June 1983. It was the eighth race of the 1983 Formula One World Championship.

The 70-lap race was won from pole position by Frenchman René Arnoux, driving a Ferrari. American Eddie Cheever finished second in a Renault, with Arnoux's compatriot and teammate Patrick Tambay third. Tambay moved to within three points of Drivers' Championship leader Alain Prost, who finished fifth in the other Renault.

== Classification ==
=== Qualifying ===
Pos	No	Driver	Constructor	Q1	Q2	Gap
1	28	(France) René Arnoux	Ferrari	1:28.984	1:28.729	
2	15	(France) Alain Prost	Renault	1:29.942	1:28.830	+0.101
3	5	(Brazil) Nelson Piquet	Brabham-BMW	1:30.366	1:28.887	+0.158
4	27	(France) Patrick Tambay	Ferrari	1:28.992	1:29.658	+0.263
5	6	(Italy) Riccardo Patrese	Brabham-BMW	1:31.227	1:29.549	+0.820
6	16	(United States) Eddie Cheever	Renault	1:30.255	1:29.863	+1.134
7	9	(West Germany) Manfred Winkelhock	ATS-BMW	1:31.756	1:30.966	+2.237
8	22	(Italy) Andrea de Cesaris	Alfa Romeo	1:31.813	1:31.173	+2.444
9	1	(Finland) Keke Rosberg	Williams-Ford	1:31.583	1:31.480	+2.751
10	36	(Italy) Bruno Giacomelli	Toleman-Hart	1:32.208	1:31.586	+2.857
11	11	(Italy) Elio de Angelis	Lotus-Renault	1:33.231	1:31.822	+3.093
12	35	(United Kingdom) Derek Warwick	Toleman-Hart	1:32.351	1:32.116	+3.387
13	2	(France) Jacques Laffite	Williams-Ford	1:32.185	1:32.632	+3.456
14	29	(Switzerland) Marc Surer	Arrows-Ford	1:32.931	1:32.540	+3.811
15	30	(Belgium) Thierry Boutsen	Arrows-Ford	1:32.643	1:32.576	+3.847
16	25	(France) Jean-Pierre Jarier	Ligier-Ford	1:34.403	1:32.642	+3.913
17	3	(Italy) Michele Alboreto	Tyrrell-Ford	1:33.664	1:33.175	+4.446
18	12	(United Kingdom) Nigel Mansell	Lotus-Ford	1:33.588	1:34.010	+4.859
19	8	(Austria) Niki Lauda	McLaren-Ford	1:34.452	1:33.671	+4.942
20	7	(United Kingdom) John Watson	McLaren-Ford	1:34.008	1:33.705	+4.976
21	33	(Colombia) Roberto Guerrero	Theodore-Ford	1:35.283	1:33.721	+4.992
22	4	(United States) Danny Sullivan	Tyrrell-Ford	1:34.680	1:33.791	+5.062
23	34	(Venezuela) Johnny Cecotto	Theodore-Ford	1:36.260	1:34.314	+5.585
24	26	(Brazil) Raul Boesel	Ligier-Ford	1:34.967	1:34.486	+5.757
25	31	(Italy) Corrado Fabi	Osella-Ford	1:35.554	1:34.544	+5.815
26	23	(Italy) Mauro Baldi	Alfa Romeo	1:34.988	1:34.755	+6.026
27	17	(Canada) Jacques Villeneuve	RAM-Ford	1:37.858	1:35.133	+6.404
28	32	(Italy) Piercarlo Ghinzani	Osella-Alfa Romeo	1:35.493	1:35.171	+6.442

=== Race ===
Pos	No	Driver	Constructor	Tyre	Laps	Time/Retired	Grid	Points
1	28	(France) René Arnoux	Ferrari	G	70	1:48:31.838	1	9
2	16	(United States) Eddie Cheever	Renault	M	70	+ 42.029	6	6
3	27	(France) Patrick Tambay	Ferrari	G	70	+ 52.610	4	4
4	1	(Finland) Keke Rosberg	Williams-Ford	G	70	+ 1:17.048	9	3
5	15	(France) Alain Prost	Renault	M	69	+ 1 lap	2	2
6	7	(United Kingdom) John Watson	McLaren-Ford	M	69	+ 1 lap	20	1
7	30	(Belgium) Thierry Boutsen	Arrows-Ford	G	69	+ 1 lap	15	
8	3	(Italy) Michele Alboreto	Tyrrell-Ford	G	68	+ 2 laps	17	
9	9	(West Germany) Manfred Winkelhock	ATS-BMW	G	67	+ 3 laps	7	
10	23	(Italy) Mauro Baldi	Alfa Romeo	M	67	+ 3 laps	26	
DSQ	4	(United States) Danny Sullivan	Tyrrell-Ford	G	68	Car underweight	22	
Ret	6	(Italy) Riccardo Patrese	Brabham-BMW	M	56	Gearbox	5	
Ret	35	(United Kingdom) Derek Warwick	Toleman-Hart	P	47	Turbo	12	
Ret	36	(Italy) Bruno Giacomelli	Toleman-Hart	P	43	Engine	10	
Ret	12	(United Kingdom) Nigel Mansell	Lotus-Ford	P	43	Handling	18	
Ret	22	(Italy) Andrea de Cesaris	Alfa Romeo	M	42	Engine	8	
Ret	2	(France) Jacques Laffite	Williams-Ford	G	37	Gearbox	13	
Ret	26	(Brazil) Raul Boesel	Ligier-Ford	M	32	Halfshaft	24	
Ret	33	(Colombia) Roberto Guerrero	Theodore-Ford	G	27	Engine	21	
Ret	31	(Italy) Corrado Fabi	Osella-Ford	M	26	Engine	25	
Ret	34	(Venezuela) Johnny Cecotto	Theodore-Ford	G	17	Differential	23	
Ret	5	(Brazil) Nelson Piquet	Brabham-BMW	M	15	Throttle	3	
Ret	8	(Austria) Niki Lauda	McLaren-Ford	M	11	Spun off	19	
Ret	11	(Italy) Elio de Angelis	Lotus-Renault	P	1	Throttle	11	
Ret	29	(Switzerland) Marc Surer	Arrows-Ford	G	1	Transmission	14	
Ret	25	(France) Jean-Pierre Jarier	Ligier-Ford	M	0	Gearbox	16	
DNQ	17	(Canada) Jacques Villeneuve	RAM-Ford	P				
DNQ	32	(Italy) Piercarlo Ghinzani	Osella-Alfa Romeo	M				

== Championship standings after the race ==
Drivers' Championship standings

Pos	Driver	Points
1	(France) Alain Prost	30
2	(Brazil) Nelson Piquet	27
3	(France) Patrick Tambay	27
4	(Finland) Keke Rosberg	25
5	(France) René Arnoux	17

Constructors' Championship standings

Pos	Constructor	Points
1	(France) Renault	44
2	(Italy) Ferrari	44
3	(United Kingdom) Williams-Ford	35
4	(United Kingdom) Brabham-BMW	27
5	(United Kingdom) McLaren-Ford	26

- Note: Only the top five positions are included for both sets of standings.

Previous race: 1983 Detroit Grand Prix	FIA Formula One World Championship; 1983 season	Next race: 1983 British Grand Prix
Previous race: 1982 Canadian Grand Prix	Canadian Grand Prix	Next race: 1984 Canadian Grand Prix
