= 1983 Belgian Grand Prix =

- Race 6 of 15 in the 1983 Formula One World Championship
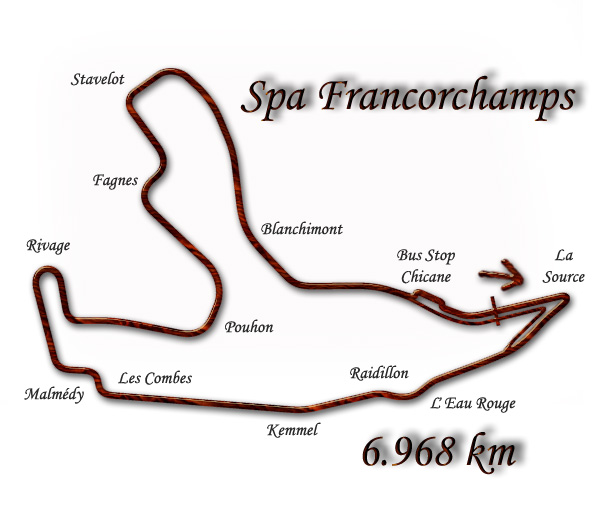

Race details
- Date: 22 May 1983
- Official name: XL Grote Prijs van Belgie
- Location: Circuit de Spa-Francorchamps; Francorchamps, Wallonia, Belgium
- Course: Permanent racing facility
- Course length: 6.940 km (4.312 miles)
- Distance: 40 laps, 280.16 km (174.08 miles)

Pole position
Driver	(France) Alain Prost	Renault
- Time: 2:04.615

Fastest lap
Driver	(Italy) Andrea de Cesaris	Alfa Romeo
- Time: 2:07.493 on lap 17

Podium
First	(France) Alain Prost	Renault
Second	(France) Patrick Tambay	Ferrari
Third	(United States) Eddie Cheever	Renault

The 1983 Belgian Grand Prix was a Formula One motor race held at Spa-Francorchamps on 22 May 1983. It was the first Belgian Grand Prix to be held at Spa since 1970 and the first on the modern Spa circuit, and was also the sixth race of the 1983 FIA Formula One World Championship.

The 40-lap race was won from pole position by Alain Prost, driving a factory Renault. Patrick Tambay finished second in a Ferrari, with Eddie Cheever third in the other Renault. The race marked the debut of local driver and future race winner Thierry Boutsen.

The first attempt to start the race was waved off. The field drove around the circuit and lined up again for the second attempt, which was successful.

== Report ==
=== Race report ===
Andrea de Cesaris jumped from third to first at the start, overtaking Alain Prost and Patrick Tambay, and de Cesaris began to build up a lead on Prost who faced pressure from the Ferraris behind him. After initially challenging Tambay for the last podium place, René Arnoux began to fall back and was caught by Nelson Piquet with Keke Rosberg following a short distance back in 6th. Piquet got a good exit out of La Source, and powered down the hill to overtake Arnoux before Eau Rouge, leaving him in the attention of the non-turbo powered Williams cars who don't get a chance to pass before Arnoux's turbo failed, putting an end to his race a few laps later. De Cesaris pitted from the lead, but it was a slow stop, over 25 seconds, and the second stint got going with Prost leading by almost 10 seconds. Prost's mechanics did a 14.4 second stop in an era when the record was around 13.

Meanwhile, Piquet and Tambay switched positions after their stops. Piquet's pit crew managing a 15.2 second stop, refueling included, for an overcut. De Cesaris's sluggish pit stop would come to be the prologue for his retirement when injection problems made him pull up on the side of the road on lap 25. Piquet inherited second place, with Tambay close on his trails, less than 3 seconds behind. Eddie Cheever who climbed his way from 8th emerged behind them eager to attack the podium positions. The last two points places were with the underpowered Williams cars who were running a lonely and quiet race at significant distance from each other and also from the rest of the field. In the latter stages Piquet lost 5th (highest) gear and went dramatically slower on the straights as his Brabham could not reach top speed. Tambay and Cheever swiftly profited from this, dropping the 1981 champion to fourth. From here on the first six places remain unchanged. Prost won and built a 4-point lead over Piquet in the championship.

== Classification ==
=== Qualifying ===
Pos	No	Driver	Constructor	Q1	Q2	Gap
1	15	(France) Alain Prost	Renault	2:04.615	2:34.212	—
2	27	(France) Patrick Tambay	Ferrari	2:04.626	2:35.036	+0.011
3	22	(Italy) Andrea de Cesaris	Alfa Romeo	2:04.840	26:06.800	+0.225
4	5	(Brazil) Nelson Piquet	Brabham-BMW	2:05.628	3:01.465	+1.013
5	28	(France) René Arnoux	Ferrari	2:05.737	2:30.961	+1.122
6	6	(Italy) Riccardo Patrese	Brabham-BMW	2:06.137	3:01.358	+1.522
7	9	(West Germany) Manfred Winkelhock	ATS-BMW	2:06.264	2:44.663	+1.649
8	16	(United States) Eddie Cheever	Renault	2:07.294	2:25.700	+2.679
9	1	(Finland) Keke Rosberg	Williams-Ford	2:07.975	2:30.151	+3.360
10	29	(Switzerland) Marc Surer	Arrows-Ford	2:08.587	2:35.016	+3.972
11	2	(France) Jacques Laffite	Williams-Ford	2:09.153	3:20.872	+4.538
12	23	(Italy) Mauro Baldi	Alfa Romeo	2:09.225	18:49.960	+4.610
13	11	(Italy) Elio de Angelis	Lotus-Renault	2:09.310	2:30.478	+4.695
14	33	(Colombia) Roberto Guerrero	Theodore-Ford	2:09.322	2:31.077	+4.707
15	8	(Austria) Niki Lauda	McLaren-Ford	2:09.475	3:00.356	+4.860
16	36	(Italy) Bruno Giacomelli	Toleman-Hart	2:09.706	2:35.556	+5.091
17	3	(Italy) Michele Alboreto	Tyrrell-Ford	2:09.739	2:31.533	+5.124
18	30	(Belgium) Thierry Boutsen	Arrows-Ford	2:09.876	2:35.832	+5.261
19	12	(United Kingdom) Nigel Mansell	Lotus-Ford	2:09.924	no time	+5.309
20	7	(United Kingdom) John Watson	McLaren-Ford	2:10.318	no time	+5.703
21	25	(France) Jean-Pierre Jarier	Ligier-Ford	2:11.354	2:49.311	+6.739
22	35	(United Kingdom) Derek Warwick	Toleman-Hart	2:11.474	2:30.477	+6.859
23	4	(United States) Danny Sullivan	Tyrrell-Ford	2:11.683	2:38.284	+7.068
24	31	(Italy) Corrado Fabi	Osella-Ford	2:11.734	2:41.895	+7.119
25	34	(Venezuela) Johnny Cecotto	Theodore-Ford	2:11.860	2:43.780	+7.245
26	26	(Brazil) Raul Boesel	Ligier-Ford	2:12.310	2:34.659	+7.695
27	32	(Italy) Piercarlo Ghinzani	Osella-Alfa Romeo	2:13.738	no time	+9.123
28	17	(Chile) Eliseo Salazar	RAM-Ford	2:18.696	no time	+14.081

=== Race ===
Pos	No	Driver	Constructor	Tyre	Laps	Time/Retired	Grid	Points
1	15	(France) Alain Prost	Renault	MI	40	1:27:11.502	1	9
2	27	(France) Patrick Tambay	Ferrari	G	40	+ 23.182	2	6
3	16	(United States) Eddie Cheever	Renault	MI	40	+ 39.869	8	4
4	5	(Brazil) Nelson Piquet	Brabham-BMW	MI	40	+ 42.295	4	3
5	1	(Finland) Keke Rosberg	Williams-Ford	G	40	+ 50.480	9	2
6	2	(France) Jacques Laffite	Williams-Ford	G	40	+ 1:33.107	11	1
7	35	(United Kingdom) Derek Warwick	Toleman-Hart	P	40	+ 1:58.539	22	
8	36	(Italy) Bruno Giacomelli	Toleman-Hart	P	40	+ 2:38.273	16	
9	11	(Italy) Elio de Angelis	Lotus-Renault	P	39	+ 1 Lap	13	
10	34	(Venezuela) Johnny Cecotto	Theodore-Ford	G	39	+ 1 Lap	25	
11	29	(Switzerland) Marc Surer	Arrows-Ford	G	39	+ 1 lap	10	
12	4	(United States) Danny Sullivan	Tyrrell-Ford	G	39	+ 1 Lap	23	
13	26	(Brazil) Raul Boesel	Ligier-Ford	MI	39	+ 1 Lap	26	
14	3	(Italy) Michele Alboreto	Tyrrell-Ford	G	38	+ 2 Laps	17	
Ret	8	(Austria) Niki Lauda	McLaren-Ford	MI	33	Gearbox	15	
Ret	12	(United Kingdom) Nigel Mansell	Lotus-Ford	P	30	Gearbox	19	
Ret	22	(Italy) Andrea de Cesaris	Alfa Romeo	MI	25	Injection	3	
Ret	33	(Colombia) Roberto Guerrero	Theodore-Ford	G	23	Engine	14	
Ret	28	(France) René Arnoux	Ferrari	G	22	Engine	5	
Ret	31	(Italy) Corrado Fabi	Osella-Ford	MI	19	Wheel	24	
Ret	9	(West Germany) Manfred Winkelhock	ATS-BMW	G	18	Wheel	7	
Ret	7	(United Kingdom) John Watson	McLaren-Ford	MI	8	Collision	20	
Ret	25	(France) Jean-Pierre Jarier	Ligier-Ford	MI	8	Collision	21	
Ret	30	(Belgium) Thierry Boutsen	Arrows-Ford	G	4	Suspension	18	
Ret	23	(Italy) Mauro Baldi	Alfa Romeo	MI	3	Throttle	12	
Ret	6	(Italy) Riccardo Patrese	Brabham-BMW	MI	0	Engine	6	
DNQ	32	(Italy) Piercarlo Ghinzani	Osella-Alfa Romeo	MI				
DNQ	17	(Chile) Eliseo Salazar	RAM-Ford	P				

== Championship standings after the race ==
Drivers' Championship standings

Pos	Driver	Points
1	(France) Alain Prost	28
2	(Brazil) Nelson Piquet	24
3	(France) Patrick Tambay	23
4	(Finland) Keke Rosberg	16
5	(United Kingdom) John Watson	11

Constructors' Championship standings

Pos	Constructor	Points
1	(France) Renault	36
2	(Italy) Ferrari	31
3	(United Kingdom) Brabham-BMW	24
4	(United Kingdom) Williams-Ford	24
5	(United Kingdom) McLaren-Ford	21

- Note: Only the top five positions are included for both sets of standings.

Previous race: 1983 Monaco Grand Prix	FIA Formula One World Championship; 1983 season	Next race: 1983 Detroit Grand Prix
Previous race: 1982 Belgian Grand Prix; Previous race at Spa-Francorchamps: 1970 Belgian Grand Prix	Belgian Grand Prix	Next race: 1984 Belgian Grand Prix
