= 1983 Monaco Grand Prix =

Coordinates: 43°44′4.74″N 7°25′16.8″E

- Race 5 of 15 in the 1983 Formula One World Championship
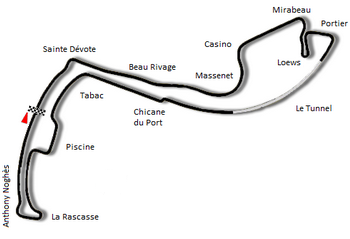

Race details
- Date: 15 May 1983
- Official name: 41e Grand Prix de Monaco
- Location: Circuit de Monaco, Monte Carlo, Monaco
- Course: Street circuit
- Course length: 3.312 km (2.057 miles)
- Distance: 76 laps, 251.712 km (156.406 miles)
- Weather: Wet track at the start

Pole position
Driver	(France) Alain Prost	Renault
- Time: 1:24.840

Fastest lap
Driver	(Brazil) Nelson Piquet	Brabham-BMW
- Time: 1:27.283 on lap 69

Podium
First	(Finland) Keke Rosberg	Williams-Ford
Second	(Brazil) Nelson Piquet	Brabham-BMW
Third	(France) Alain Prost	Renault

The 1983 Monaco Grand Prix was a Formula One motor race held at Monaco on 15 May 1983. It was the fifth race of the 1983 Formula One World Championship. The 76-lap race was won by Finnish driver Keke Rosberg, driving a Williams-Ford (the last victory of Williams in Monaco until 2003 with Juan Pablo Montoya), with Brazilian Nelson Piquet second in a Brabham-BMW and Frenchman Alain Prost third in a Renault. This was only time that both works McLaren cars failed to qualify for a race.

Thirty years later, Rosberg's son Nico won the 2013 race, making them the first father and son to win in the principality.

== Classification ==
=== Pre-qualifying ===
Pos	No	Driver	Constructor	Time	Gap
1	36	(Italy) Bruno Giacomelli	Toleman-Hart	1:32.190	—
2	17	(Chile) Eliseo Salazar	RAM-Ford	1:32.502	+0.312
3	35	(United Kingdom) Derek Warwick	Toleman-Hart	1:33.453	+1.263
4	34	(Venezuela) Johnny Cecotto	Theodore-Ford	1:33.817	+1.627
5	33	(Colombia) Roberto Guerrero	Theodore-Ford	1:38.389	+6.199

=== Qualifying ===
Pos	No	Driver	Constructor	Q1	Q2	Gap
1	15	(France) Alain Prost	Renault	1:24.840	1:52.845	—
2	28	(France) René Arnoux	Ferrari	1:25.182	1:52.183	+0.342
3	16	(United States) Eddie Cheever	Renault	1:26.279	1:52.434	+1.439
4	27	(France) Patrick Tambay	Ferrari	1:26.298	1:53.987	+1.458
5	1	(Finland) Keke Rosberg	Williams-Ford	1:26.307	1:52.030	+1.467
6	5	(Brazil) Nelson Piquet	Brabham-BMW	1:27.273	1:56.736	+2.433
7	22	(Italy) Andrea de Cesaris	Alfa Romeo	1:27.680	1:54.335	+2.840
8	2	(France) Jacques Laffite	Williams-Ford	1:27.726	1:53.580	+2.886
9	25	(France) Jean-Pierre Jarier	Ligier-Ford	1:27.906	1:55.986	+3.066
10	35	(United Kingdom) Derek Warwick	Toleman-Hart	1:28.017	no time	+3.177
11	3	(Italy) Michele Alboreto	Tyrrell-Ford	1:28.256	2:00.969	+3.416
12	29	(Switzerland) Marc Surer	Arrows-Ford	1:28.346	1:56.836	+3.506
13	23	(Italy) Mauro Baldi	Alfa Romeo	1:28.639	1:56.398	+3.799
14	12	(United Kingdom) Nigel Mansell	Lotus-Ford	1:28.721	1:56.560	+3.881
15	30	(Brazil) Chico Serra	Arrows-Ford	1:28.784	no time	+3.944
16	9	(West Germany) Manfred Winkelhock	ATS-BMW	1:28.975	2:01.178	+4.135
17	6	(Italy) Riccardo Patrese	Brabham-BMW	1:29.200	no time	+4.360
18	26	(Brazil) Raul Boesel	Ligier-Ford	1:29.222	1:59.110	+4.382
19	11	(Italy) Elio de Angelis	Lotus-Renault	1:29.518	1:56.762	+4.678
20	4	(United States) Danny Sullivan	Tyrrell-Ford	1:29.530	2:09.076	+4.690
21	36	(Italy) Bruno Giacomelli	Toleman-Hart	1:29.552	no time	+4.712
22	8	(Austria) Niki Lauda	McLaren-Ford	1:29.898	1:52.448	+5.058
23	7	(United Kingdom) John Watson	McLaren-Ford	1:30.283	1:53.772	+5.443
24	31	(Italy) Corrado Fabi	Osella-Ford	1:30.495	no time	+5.655
25	17	(Chile) Eliseo Salazar	RAM-Ford	1:31.229	no time	+6.389
26	32	(Italy) Piercarlo Ghinzani	Osella-Alfa Romeo	1:35.572	no time	+10.732

=== Race ===
Pos	No	Driver	Constructor	Tyre	Laps	Time/Retired	Grid	Points
1	1	(Finland) Keke Rosberg	Williams-Ford	G	76	1:56:38.121	5	9
2	5	(Brazil) Nelson Piquet	Brabham-BMW	MI	76	+ 18.475	6	6
3	15	(France) Alain Prost	Renault	MI	76	+ 31.366	1	4
4	27	(France) Patrick Tambay	Ferrari	G	76	+ 1:04.297	4	3
5	4	(United States) Danny Sullivan	Tyrrell-Ford	G	74	+ 2 Laps	20	2
6	23	(Italy) Mauro Baldi	Alfa Romeo	MI	74	+ 2 Laps	13	1
7	30	(Brazil) Chico Serra	Arrows-Ford	G	74	+ 2 Laps	15	
Ret	6	(Italy) Riccardo Patrese	Brabham-BMW	MI	64	Electrical	17	
Ret	2	(France) Jacques Laffite	Williams-Ford	G	53	Gearbox	8	
Ret	29	(Switzerland) Marc Surer	Arrows-Ford	G	49	Collision	12	
Ret	35	(United Kingdom) Derek Warwick	Toleman-Hart	P	49	Collision	10	
Ret	11	(Italy) Elio de Angelis	Lotus-Renault	P	49	Halfshaft	19	
Ret	25	(France) Jean-Pierre Jarier	Ligier-Ford	MI	32	Suspension	9	
Ret	16	(United States) Eddie Cheever	Renault	MI	30	Engine	3	
Ret	22	(Italy) Andrea de Cesaris	Alfa Romeo	MI	13	Gearbox	7	
Ret	28	(France) René Arnoux	Ferrari	G	6	Suspension	2	
Ret	26	(Brazil) Raul Boesel	Ligier-Ford	MI	3	Collision	18	
Ret	9	(West Germany) Manfred Winkelhock	ATS-BMW	G	3	Collision	16	
Ret	3	(Italy) Michele Alboreto	Tyrrell-Ford	G	0	Collision	11	
Ret	12	(United Kingdom) Nigel Mansell	Lotus-Ford	P	0	Collision	14	
DNQ	36	(Italy) Bruno Giacomelli	Toleman-Hart	P				
DNQ	8	(Austria) Niki Lauda	McLaren-Ford	MI				
DNQ	7	(United Kingdom) John Watson	McLaren-Ford	MI				
DNQ	31	(Italy) Corrado Fabi	Osella-Ford	MI				
DNQ	17	(Chile) Eliseo Salazar	RAM-Ford	P				
DNQ	32	(Italy) Piercarlo Ghinzani	Osella-Alfa Romeo	MI				
DNPQ	34	(Venezuela) Johnny Cecotto	Theodore-Ford	G				
DNPQ	33	(Colombia) Roberto Guerrero	Theodore-Ford	G				

== Championship standings after the race ==
Drivers' Championship standings

Pos	Driver	Points
1	(Brazil) Nelson Piquet	21
2	(France) Alain Prost	19
3	(France) Patrick Tambay	17
4	(Finland) Keke Rosberg	14
5	(United Kingdom) John Watson	11

Constructors' Championship standings

Pos	Constructor	Points
1	(Italy) Ferrari	25
2	(France) Renault	23
3	(United Kingdom) Brabham-BMW	21
4	(United Kingdom) McLaren-Ford	21
5	(United Kingdom) Williams-Ford	21

- Note: Only the top five positions are included for both sets of standings.

Previous race: 1983 San Marino Grand Prix	FIA Formula One World Championship; 1983 season	Next race: 1983 Belgian Grand Prix
Previous race: 1982 Monaco Grand Prix	Monaco Grand Prix	Next race: 1984 Monaco Grand Prix
