= Newman/Haas IndyCar featuring Nigel Mansell =

1994 video game

- North American cover art (Super NES version)
- Developer: Gremlin Graphics
- Publisher: Acclaim Entertainment
- Composers: Mark Cooksey; Neil Biggin
- Platforms: Super NES, Sega Genesis
- Release: Super NES: JP: December 16, 1994; NA: November 1994; EU: December 2, 1994; Sega Genesis: JP: December 16, 1994; NA: December 1994; EU: December 2, 1994
- Genre: Racing
- Modes: Single-player, multiplayer

Newman/Haas IndyCar featuring Nigel Mansell, released in Japan as Nigel Mansell Indy Car (ナイジェルマンセル・インディカー) and in South America as Newman/Haas IndyCar Estrelando Nigel Mansell, is an IndyCar racing video game developed by Gremlin Graphics and published by Acclaim Entertainment, which was released in 1994 for the Super NES and Sega Genesis/Mega Drive.

== Gameplay ==
This title can be considered as the sequel to Nigel Mansell's World Championship Racing, and is based on the 1994 IndyCar season featuring Nigel Mansell and the motor racing team Newman/Haas Racing.

== Reception ==
GamePro gave the Genesis version a mixed review. They criticized the lack of a change view feature (which had by that time become standard for racing games) and the absence of graphical detail, but praised the split-screen multiplayer, highly responsive controls, and the choice of an intense, simplistic arcade mode and a simulation mode which demands careful, thoughtful decision-making from the player. They assessed the Super NES version to be not as good due to the less dramatic visuals and less realistic engine sounds.

Next Generation gave the SNES version of the game two stars out of five, and called the game repetitive, dull, and not fun.

== See also ==
- Newman/Haas Racing (video game)
