= Nigel Mansell =

British racing driver (born 1953)

Nigel Mansell CBE
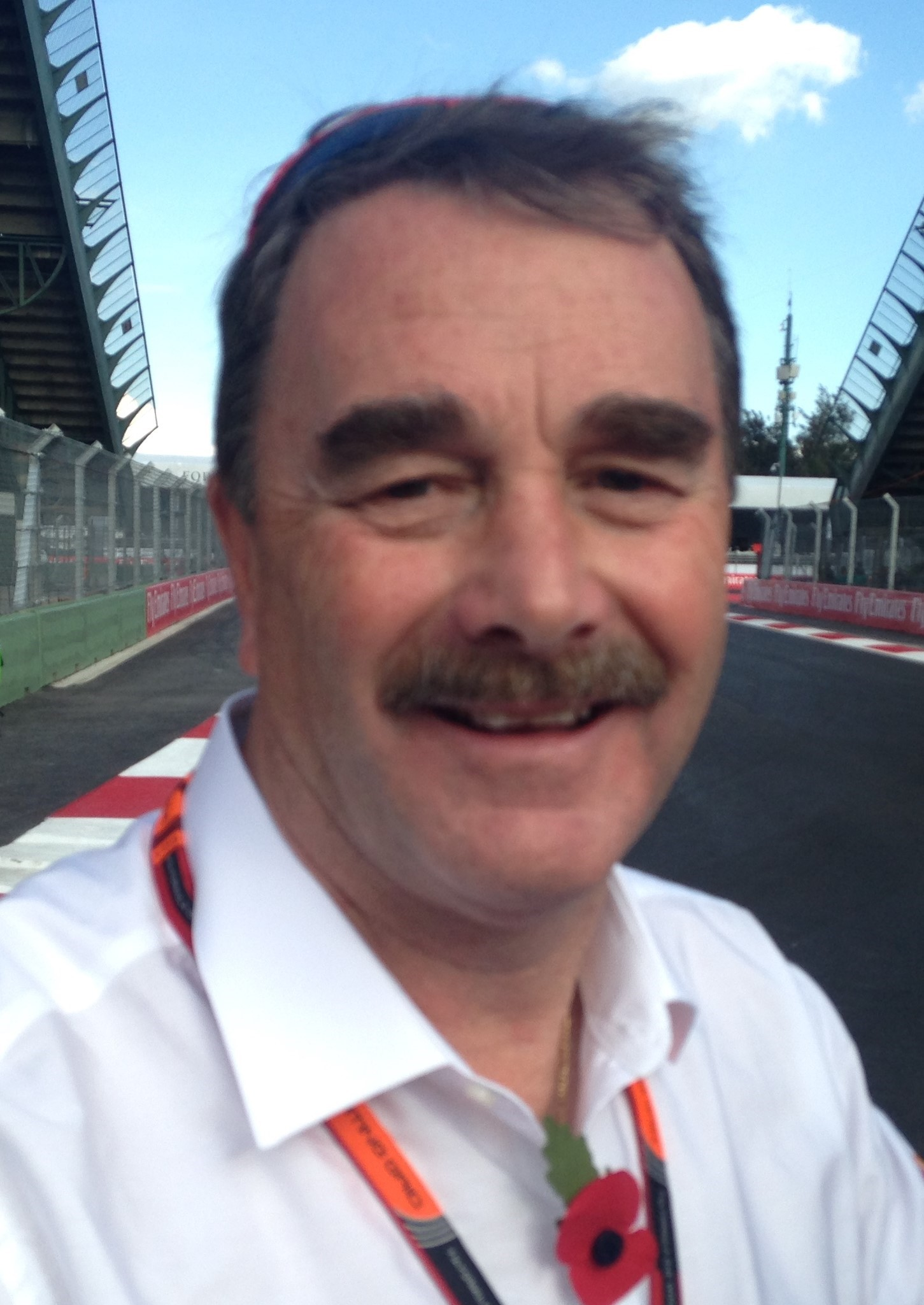
- Mansell at the 2015 Mexican Grand Prix
- Born: Nigel Ernest James Mansell; 8 August 1953 (age 73); Upton-upon-Severn, Worcestershire, England
- Spouse: Roseanne (m. 1975)
- Children: 3, including Leo and Greg

Formula One World Championship career
- Nationality: (United Kingdom) British
- Active years: 1980–1992, 1994–1995
- Team(s): Lotus, Williams, Ferrari, McLaren
- Entries: 191 (187 starts)
- Championships: 1 (1992)
- Wins: 31
- Podiums: 59
- Career points: 480 (482) (Note: Up until 1990, not all points scored by a driver contributed to their final World Championship tally (see list of points scoring systems for more information). Numbers without parentheses are Championship points; numbers in parentheses are total points scored.)
- Pole positions: 32
- Fastest laps: 30
- First entry: 1980 Austrian Grand Prix
- First win: 1985 European Grand Prix
- Last win: 1994 Australian Grand Prix
- Last entry: 1995 Spanish Grand Prix

Champ Car career
- 31 races run over 2 years
- Team: Newman/Haas
- Best finish: 1st (1993)
- First race: 1993 FAI IndyCar Grand Prix (Surfers Paradise)
- Last race: 1994 Monterey Grand Prix (Laguna Seca)
- First win: 1993 FAI IndyCar Grand Prix (Surfers Paradise)
- Last win: 1993 Bosch Spark Plug Grand Prix (Nazareth)
Wins	Podiums	Poles
5	13	10

24 Hours of Le Mans career
- Years: 2010
- Teams: Beechdean
- Best finish: DNF (2010)
- Class wins: 0

Nigel Ernest James Mansell (/ˈmænsəl/; born 8 August 1953) is a British former racing driver who competed in Formula One from 1980 to 1995. Mansell won the Formula One World Drivers' Championship in 1992 with Williams, and won 31 Grands Prix across 15 seasons. In American open-wheel racing, Mansell won the IndyCar World Series in 1993 with Newman/Haas Racing, and remains the only driver to have simultaneously held both the World Drivers' Championship and the American open-wheel National Championship.

Mansell's career in Formula One spanned 15 seasons, with his final two full seasons of top-level racing being spent in the CART series. He was the reigning F1 champion when he moved to CART, becoming the first person to win the CART title in his debut season, and making him the only person to hold both the World Drivers' Championship and the American open-wheel National Championship simultaneously. Mansell is one of the most successful British Formula One drivers of all time in terms of race wins with 31 victories, behind Lewis Hamilton with 106 wins, and is eighth overall on the Formula One race winners list. He held the record for the most pole positions set in a single season, which was broken in 2011 by Sebastian Vettel. He was the last Formula One driver to win a Grand Prix over the age of 40 with his win at the 1994 Australian Grand Prix, until Lewis Hamilton's win at the 2026 Barcelona-Catalunya Grand Prix.

Mansell raced in the Grand Prix Masters series in 2005, and won the championship title. He later signed a one-off race deal for the Scuderia Ecosse GT race team to drive their number 63 Ferrari F430 GT2 car at Silverstone on 6 May 2007. He has since competed in additional sports car races with his sons Leo and Greg, including the 2010 24 Hours of Le Mans, and was inducted into the International Motorsports Hall of Fame in 2005.

== Early life and career ==
Nigel Ernest James Mansell was born on 8 August 1953 in Upton-upon-Severn, Worcestershire, where his parents, Eric and Joyce Mansell, ran a tea shop. He grew up in Hall Green, Birmingham. He attended Hall Green Secondary School.

Mansell had a fairly slow start to his racing career, using his own money to help work his way up the ranks. After considerable success in kart racing, he moved to the Formula Ford series to the disapproval of his father. In 1976, Mansell won six of the nine races he took part in, including his debut event at Mallory Park. He entered 42 races the following year and won 33 of them to become the 1977 British Formula Ford 1600 champion, despite suffering a broken neck in a qualifying session at Brands Hatch. Doctors told him he had been perilously close to quadriplegia, that he would be confined for six months and would never drive again. Mansell discharged himself from the hospital and returned to racing. Three weeks before the accident he had resigned from his job as an aerospace engineer, having previously sold most of his personal belongings to finance his foray into Formula Ford. Later that year he was given the chance to race a Lola T570 Formula 3 car at Silverstone. He finished fourth and decided that he was ready to move into the higher formula.

Mansell raced in Formula Three in 1978–1980. Mansell's first season in Formula Three started with a pole position and a second-place finish. However, the car was not competitive, as a commercial deal with Unipart required his team to use Triumph Dolomite engines that were vastly inferior to the Toyota engines used by the leading teams. After three seventh-place finishes and a fourth in his last race, he parted from the team. The next season saw him drive for David Price Racing. Following a first win in the series at Silverstone in March, he went on to finish eighth in the championship. His racing was consistent, but a collision with Andrea de Cesaris resulted in a huge cartwheeling crash which he was lucky to survive. Again he was hospitalised, this time with broken vertebrae.

Mansell's driving was noticed by Colin Chapman, owner of Lotus, and shortly after his accident, hiding the extent of his injury with painkillers, Mansell performed well enough during a tryout at the Paul Ricard circuit with Lotus, where he was pitted against a number of other drivers to determine who was going to take the second seat for the 1980 season alongside Mario Andretti, as Argentine Carlos Reutemann was leaving to go to Williams. Driving a 79, the seat eventually went to Italian driver Elio de Angelis, but Mansell was selected to become a test driver for the Norfolk-based Formula One team.

== Formula One ==
=== 1980–1984: Lotus ===
1980 and 1981

Mansell's skill as a test driver, including setting the fastest lap around Silverstone in a Lotus car at the time, impressed Chapman enough to give him a trio of starts in F1 in 1980, driving a development version of the Lotus 81 used by the team, the Lotus 81B. In his Formula One debut at the 1980 Austrian Grand Prix, a fuel leak in the cockpit that developed shortly before the start of the race left him with painful first and second degree burns on his buttocks. An engine failure forced him to retire from that race and his second, however an accident at his third event at Imola meant he failed to qualify. Team leader Mario Andretti wrote his car off in a start-line accident during the Canadian Grand Prix at Montreal, so Mansell had to give up his car for Andretti to compete in for his home race, the final race of the season at Watkins Glen in the United States. Andretti announced he was leaving to move to Alfa Romeo at the end of the season leaving Lotus with a vacant race seat.

Despite Mansell being unpopular with sponsor David Thieme of Essex Petroleum, and much speculation in the press that Jean-Pierre Jarier would fill the vacancy, Chapman announced at the start of the season that the seat would be filled by Mansell.

Mansell's four years as a full-time Lotus driver were a struggle, as the cars were unreliable and he was continually out-performed by teammate Elio de Angelis. Out of 59 race starts with the team, he finished just 24 of them. He managed a best finish of third place, which he achieved five times during the four years, including Lotus's fifth race of the 1981 season, and only the seventh of Mansell's Formula One career. Teammate Elio de Angelis took a surprise win at the 1982 Austrian Grand Prix, and was frequently faster than his less-experienced colleague Mansell.

1982

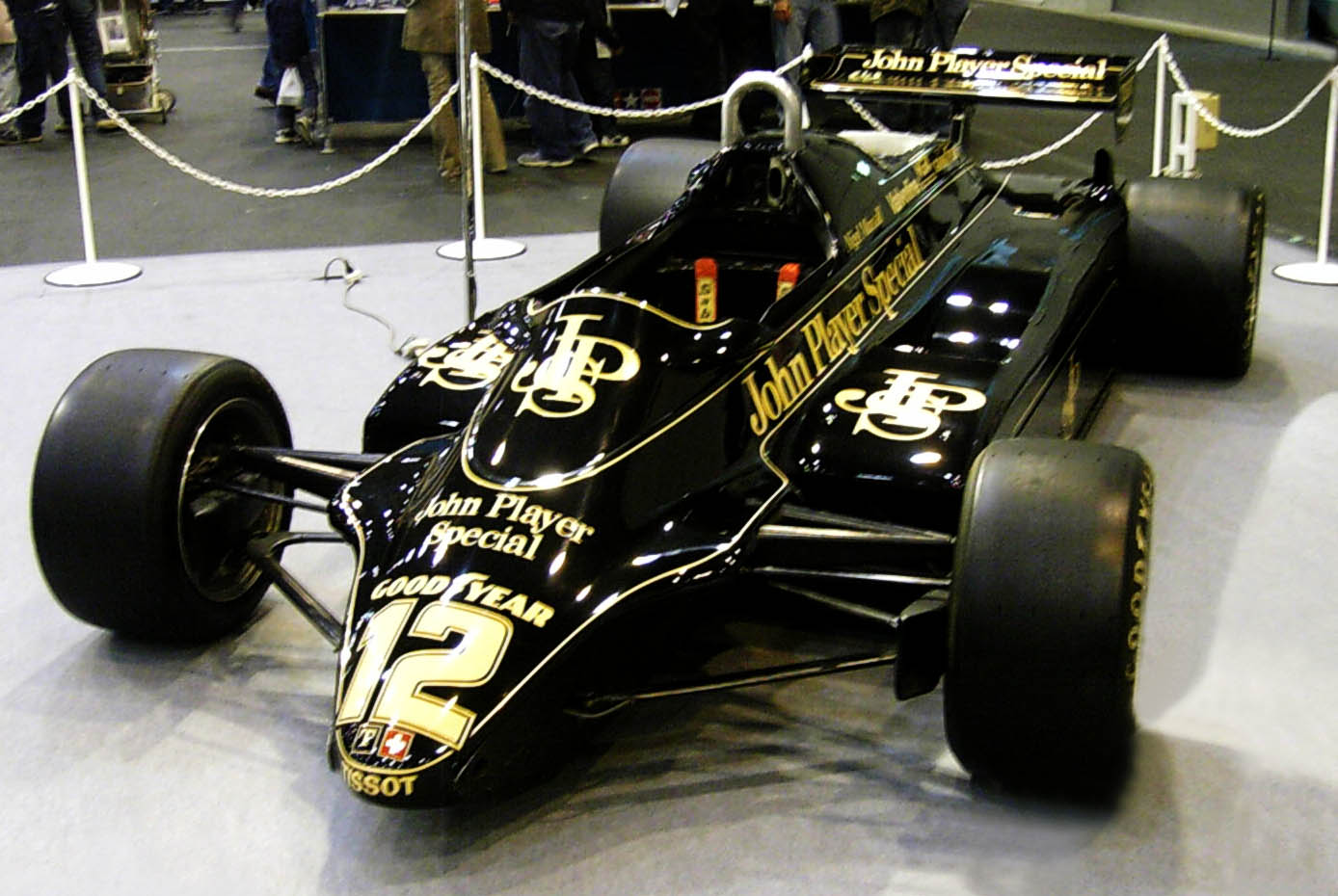
Mansell's Lotus 91 from 1982 on display

During the 1982 season, Mansell planned to race in the 24 Hours of Le Mans sportscar event in order to earn extra money. At the time Mansell was paid £50,000 a year and was offered £10,000 to take part in Le Mans. Chapman believed that by entering the Le Mans race, Mansell was exposing himself to unnecessary risk and paid him £10,000 not to take part in the race. Chapman extended Mansell's contract to the end of the 1984 season in a deal that made him a millionaire.

As a result of the gestures, such as described above, Mansell became very close to Chapman, who made him equal number one in the team with de Angelis, and was devastated by Chapman's sudden death in 1982. In his autobiography Mansell stated that when Chapman died, "The bottom dropped out of my world. Part of me died with him. I had lost a member of my family." Following Chapman's death, relationships at Lotus became strained, as replacement team principal Peter Warr did not have a high regard for him as a driver or person. In his book Team Lotus – My View From The Pit Wall, Warr wrote about the 1982 season:

After carefully analysing the season just finished, it was completely clear who was the number one. It was Elio. He was faster, he had out-qualified Nigel ten times to three. Elio had seven points scoring finishes to Nigel's two and in addition to Elio's win in Austria, had a tally of more than three times the number of points gained by Nigel. What is more, the margin by which Elio eclipsed his team-mate in qualifying overall was a huge 4.5 per cent. And all this in the year when, as near as can be reasonably achieved, the two drivers were given equal equipment and treatment.

1983

De Angelis was then promoted back to outright number one for the 1983 season. This was demonstrated by the fact that he had exclusive use of the quick but unreliable Renault turbo-charged 93T for the whole season, and Mansell did not get to drive a turbocharged car until the ninth round, the British Grand Prix at Silverstone, a race where he climbed from 16th to second and eventually finished fourth in a brand-new, hastily designed 94T. Due to their tumultuous relationship and a lack of decent results, Warr was not keen on honouring the last year of the contract that Mansell had signed with Chapman. However, with encouragement from Lotus's sponsors, John Player Special (who allegedly preferred a British driver), and with the only other remaining top British driver (Derek Warwick, after John Watson's retirement) already confirmed to be joining the factory Renault team, it was announced Mansell would be staying with the team.

1984

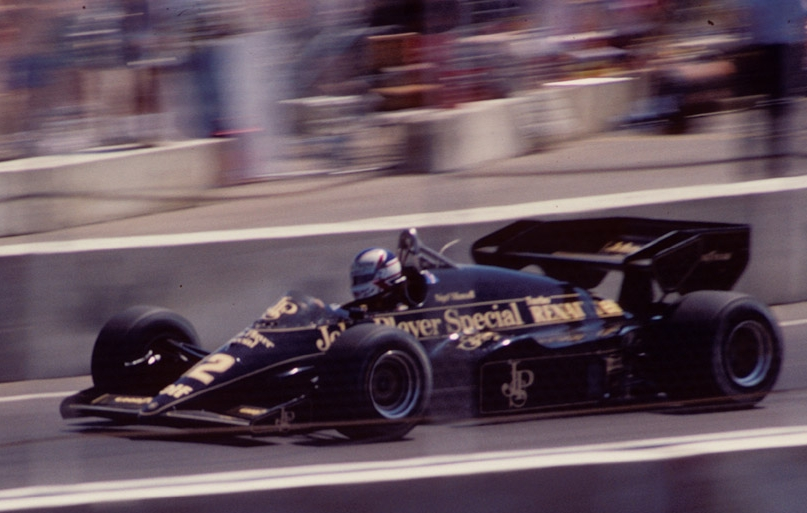
Mansell at the 1984 Dallas Grand Prix

In 1984, Mansell finished in the championship top 10 for the first time, and took his first career pole position but still finished behind teammate de Angelis, who finished third, in the championship. At the 1984 Monaco Grand Prix Mansell surprised many by overtaking Alain Prost in a wet race for the lead, but soon after retired from the race after losing control on the slippery painted lines on the road surface on the run up the hill on lap 15. Late in the season, Lotus announced the recruitment of Ayrton Senna for the following year, leaving Mansell with no race seat at Lotus. After receiving offers from Arrows and Williams, and first turning down Williams's offer, it was announced before the Dutch Grand Prix that he would indeed be joining Williams.

Mansell was remembered by many that year when he collapsed while pushing his car to the finish line after the transmission failed on the last lap of the 1984 Dallas Grand Prix. The race was one of the hottest on record, and after two hours of driving in 104 °F (about 40 °C) conditions Mansell fainted while pushing his car over the line to salvage a sixth-place finish (and thus one championship point) in a race of which he had led half, having started from pole.

In his autobiography, Mansell claimed that his final race with the Lotus team—the 1984 Portuguese Grand Prix—was heavily compromised by Warr's unwillingness to give Mansell the brake pads he desired for the race. With 18 laps of the race remaining, and with Mansell in second position, the brakes on his car failed. On Mansell's departure, Warr was quoted as saying "He'll never win a Grand Prix as long as I have a hole in my arse".

=== 1985–1988: Williams ===
1985

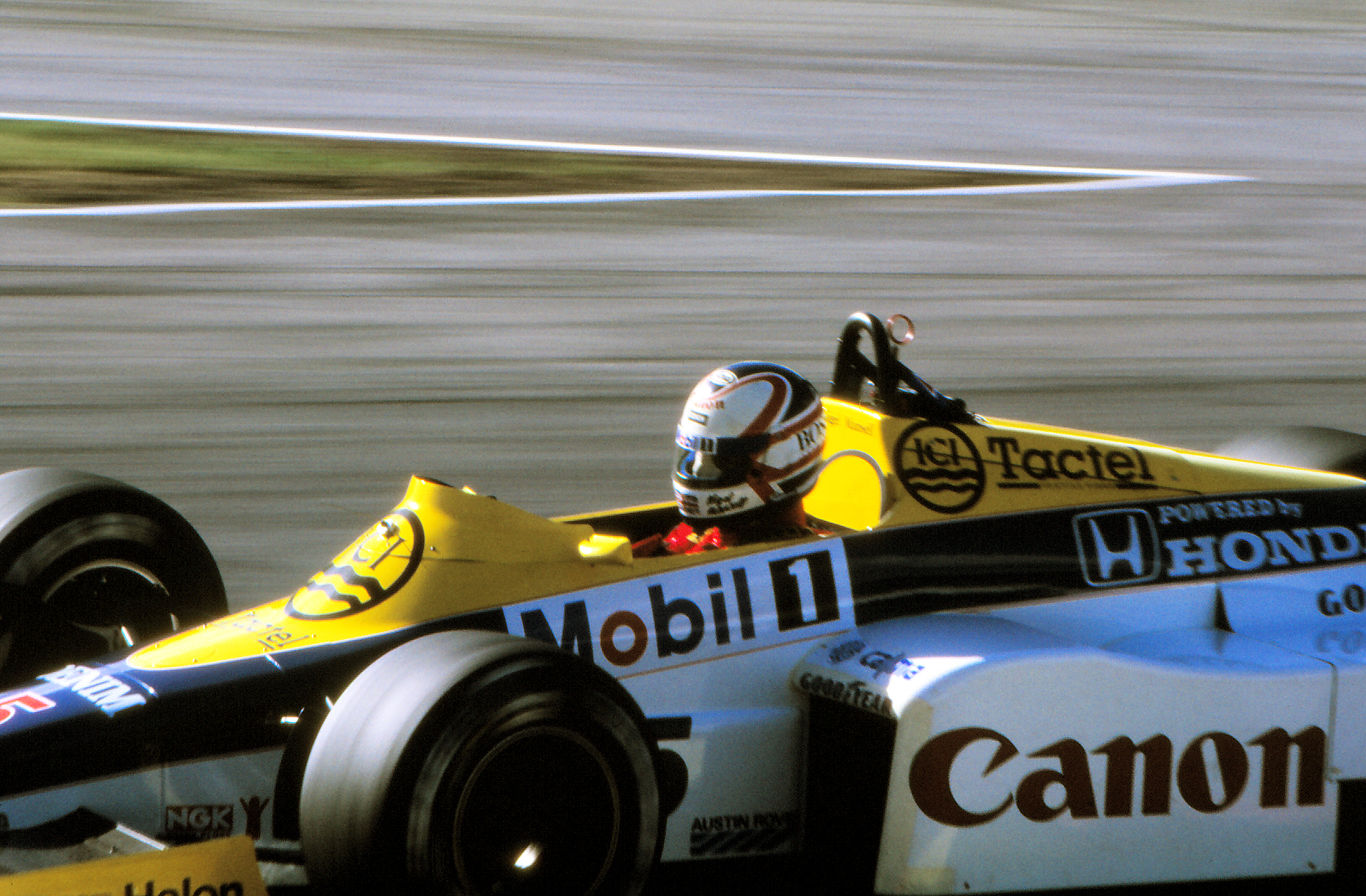
Mansell during practice for the 1985 European Grand Prix

In 1985, Frank Williams hired Mansell to drive alongside Keke Rosberg as part of the Williams team, Mansell later saying "We have the greatest respect for each other." Mansell was given the number 5 on his car, which initially was white like the 6 on Rosberg's car, but was changed to red from the Canadian Grand Prix onwards, probably to help distinguish his car from Rosberg's due to their helmets being similar. That gave birth to the "Red 5", brought to the public's attention mainly through commentator Murray Walker for the BBC, which Mansell kept carrying on subsequent Williams and Newman/Haas cars; even on the 1994 Williams, in which he would race the number 2, it would be red coloured.

Rosberg, the 1982 World Champion who was heading into his fourth season with the team, was initially against Williams signing Mansell based on the clash the pair had at Dallas the previous year (Rosberg won that race and in an interview while on the podium publicly berated Mansell's blocking tactics while leading early in the race, which earned Rosberg a round of boos from the crowd who had appreciated Mansell's courage in trying to push his Lotus to the finish in the extreme heat). Other factors were what Rosberg later said in a 1986 interview was second-hand information about Mansell which ultimately proved to be false. The drivers found they got along well and from early in the pre-season formed a good working and personal relationship.

1985 initially appeared to provide more of the same for Mansell, although he was closer to the pace than before, especially as the Honda engines became more competitive by mid-season.

During practice for the 1985 French Grand Prix, Mansell unwillingly broke the record for the highest speed crash in Formula One history. At the end of the Paul Ricard Circuit's 1.8 km long Mistral Straight, he went off at the fast Courbe de Signes at over 322 km/h (200 mph) in his Williams FW10. Mansell suffered a concussion, which kept him out of the race. Teammate Rosberg claimed the pole for the race and finished second behind the Brabham-BMW of Nelson Piquet.

Mansell achieved second place at the Belgian Grand Prix at Spa-Francorchamps, and followed this with his first victory in 72 starts at the European Grand Prix at Brands Hatch in England. He achieved a second straight victory at the South African Grand Prix in Kyalami. These triumphs helped turn Mansell into a Formula One star.

1986

Going into 1986, the Williams-Honda team had a car, the FW11 which was capable of winning regularly, and Mansell had a new confidence that led to establishing himself as a potential World Championship contender. He also had a new teammate in twice World Champion Nelson Piquet who had joined Williams looking to be a regular winner and contender again after the Brabham-BMWs had become increasingly unreliable and uncompetitive. The Brazilian publicly described Mansell as "an uneducated blockhead" and had also criticised Mansell's wife Roseanne's looks, later retracting these statements following threats of legal action.

Mansell won five Grand Prix in 1986 and also played a part in one of the closest finishes in Formula One history, finishing second to Ayrton Senna in the Spanish Grand Prix at Jerez by a mere 0.014 seconds (Mansell later jokingly said they should give himself and Senna 7½ points each). The 1986 season was led mostly by Mansell in championship points, and it went down to the wire in Adelaide, Australia for the Australian Grand Prix with Prost, Piquet and Mansell all still in contention for the title. The equation was simple, Prost and Piquet needed to win and have Mansell finish no higher than fourth. After aiming for a third-place finish which would guarantee him the title, Mansell would narrowly miss out on winning it after his left-rear tyre exploded in spectacular fashion on the main straight with only 19 laps of the race to go. In a 2012 interview for Sky Sports Legends of F1 Mansell revealed that, had he hit the wall rather than wrestling the car safely to a halt in the run-off area at the end of the straight, the stewards would most likely have red flagged the race. As the race was over two thirds distance, he would have kept his position and won his first F1 world title. Instead Mansell ended the season as runner-up to Alain Prost. His efforts in 1986 led to his being voted the BBC Sports Personality of the Year.

1986 proved to be a tough year for both Mansell and the Williams team, off the track at least. After a pre-season test session at the Paul Ricard Circuit in the south of France, team owner Frank Williams was involved in a horrific road accident which left him a tetraplegic. Williams would not return to the scene until making a surprise appearance at the British Grand Prix at Brands Hatch where Mansell and Piquet finished 1–2. Williams's absence from the day-to-day running of the team created tension between the team and engine supplier Honda. The Japanese giant regarded dual World Champion Nelson Piquet as the team's number one driver (they were reportedly paying the bulk of Piquet's multimillion-dollar retainer) and were reportedly unhappy that the team's co-owner and Technical Director Patrick Head did not rein in Mansell during races and allowed him to take both points and wins from Piquet. As it was, while Williams dominated the Constructors' Championship, the two drivers took enough points from each other to allow McLaren's Alain Prost to sneak through and win the Drivers' Championship.

Before the season had started, Honda had reportedly attempted to persuade Frank Williams to replace Mansell with their own test driver Satoru Nakajima. Williams, who was always more interested in the Constructors' title than the Drivers' as it showed that his team was the best, refused to do this, rightly believing that having two proven F1 winners in Piquet and Mansell would better serve the team than Nakajima would as an F1 rookie.

1987

Six more wins followed in 1987, including an emotional and hugely popular victory at Silverstone for the British Grand Prix in which Mansell came back from 28 seconds behind in 30 laps to beat teammate Piquet, with his car running out of fuel on the slowing down lap. A serious qualifying accident at Suzuka in Japan for the penultimate race of the season severely injured Mansell's back (a spinal concussion). Trying to beat Piquet's lap time, Mansell made a mistake and hit the guardrail. As a result of Mansell's absence from the remaining two races, Piquet became champion for the third time. Piquet called his win over Mansell "a win of intelligence over stupidity". The Brazilian also added that he won because he was more consistent than his teammate, racking up points and podiums where Mansell often ran into trouble. Piquet's was a percentage driving policy which worked well in the ultra-competitive Williams-Honda, whereas Mansell was a hard charger who many felt often pushed his luck too far.

1988

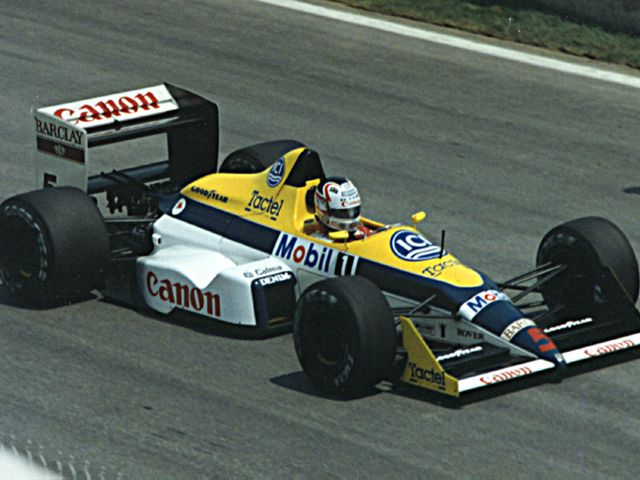
Mansell driving a Williams FW12 at the 1988 Canadian Grand Prix

In 1988, for the first time in his career, Mansell was a team's first driver, having won more races in the previous two seasons than any other driver. However, Williams lost the turbo power of Honda to McLaren, and had to settle with a naturally aspirated Judd V8 engine in its first season in F1. A dismal season followed, which saw Mansell's Williams team experiment with a terribly unreliable (but extremely innovative) active suspension system (the system had worked well when introduced by the team in 1987 where it could draw on approximately 5% of the reported 1,000 bhp (746 kW; 1,014 PS) produced by the Honda turbo, but struggled with the 600 bhp (447 kW; 608 PS) Judd V8). Mansell would complete only two of the 14 races in which he appeared in 1988, both being podium finishes. One of these was a second place at the British Grand Prix at Silverstone where, overnight, the team had stopped using its active suspension (after months of Patrick Head telling Mansell and teammate Riccardo Patrese that it would take many months of work to do so), and reverted to a passive suspension set-up.

Mansell contracted chickenpox in the summer of 1988 and after a competitive drive in the very hot conditions of the 1988 Hungarian Grand Prix the illness became worse, forcing him to miss the next two Grands Prix in Belgium where he was replaced by Martin Brundle, and Italy where he was replaced by Frenchman Jean-Louis Schlesser. By missing the Italian Grand Prix at Monza, Mansell missed the traditional welcome by the Tifosi for a newly signed Ferrari driver after he had announced he would be leaving Williams to join the Maranello-based team for 1989.

=== 1989–1990: Ferrari ===
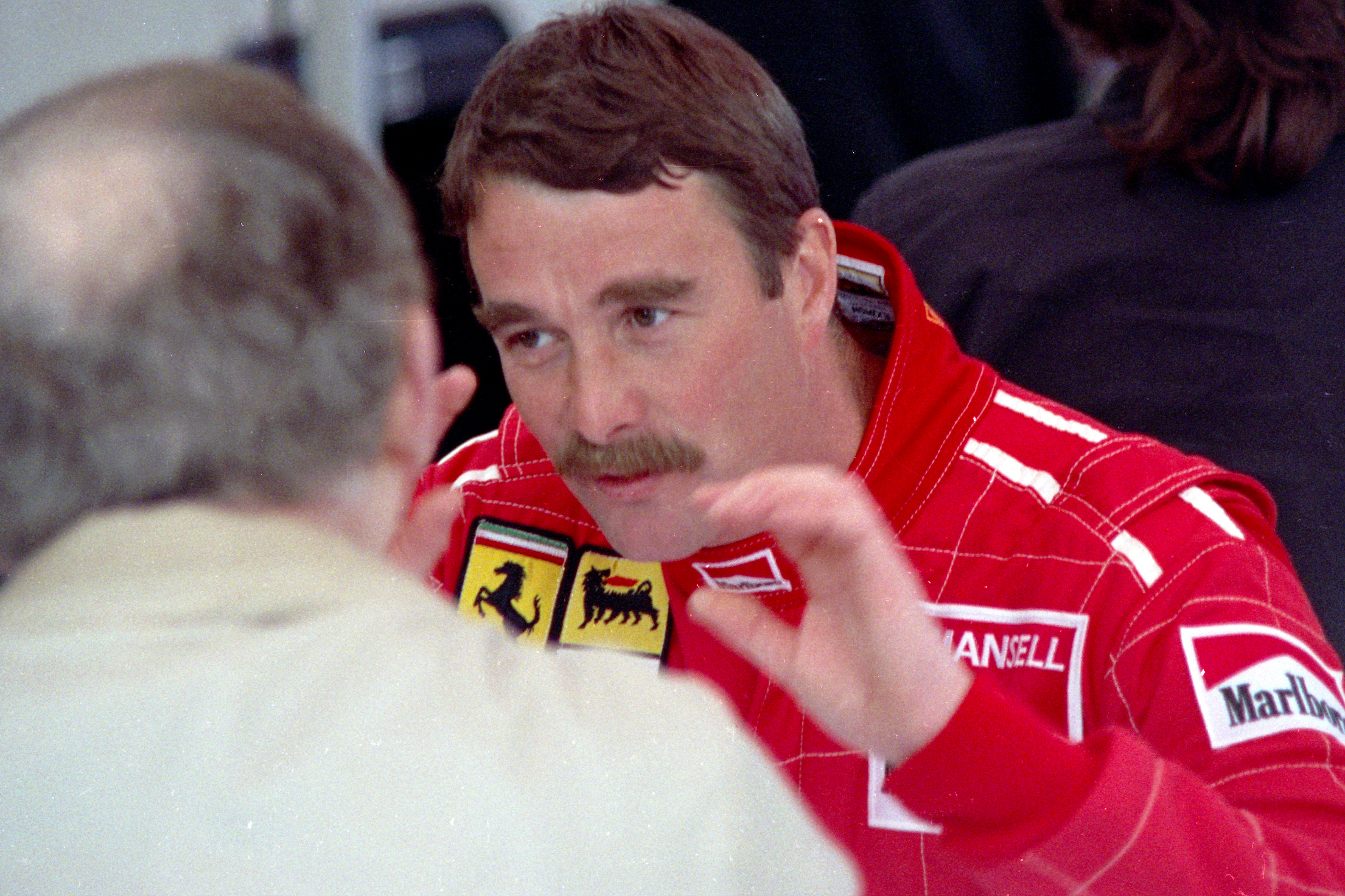
Nigel Mansell during his time with Scuderia Ferrari

1989

In preparation for the 1989 season, Mansell became the last Ferrari driver to be personally selected by Enzo Ferrari before his death in August 1988, an honour Mansell described as "one of the greatest in my entire career". Enzo Ferrari presented a 1989 Ferrari F40 as a gift to Mansell. In Italy he became known as "il leone" ("the lion") by the tifosi because of his fearless driving style. The season was one of change in the sport, with the banning of turbo engines by the FIA and the introduction of the electronically controlled semi-automatic transmission by Ferrari.

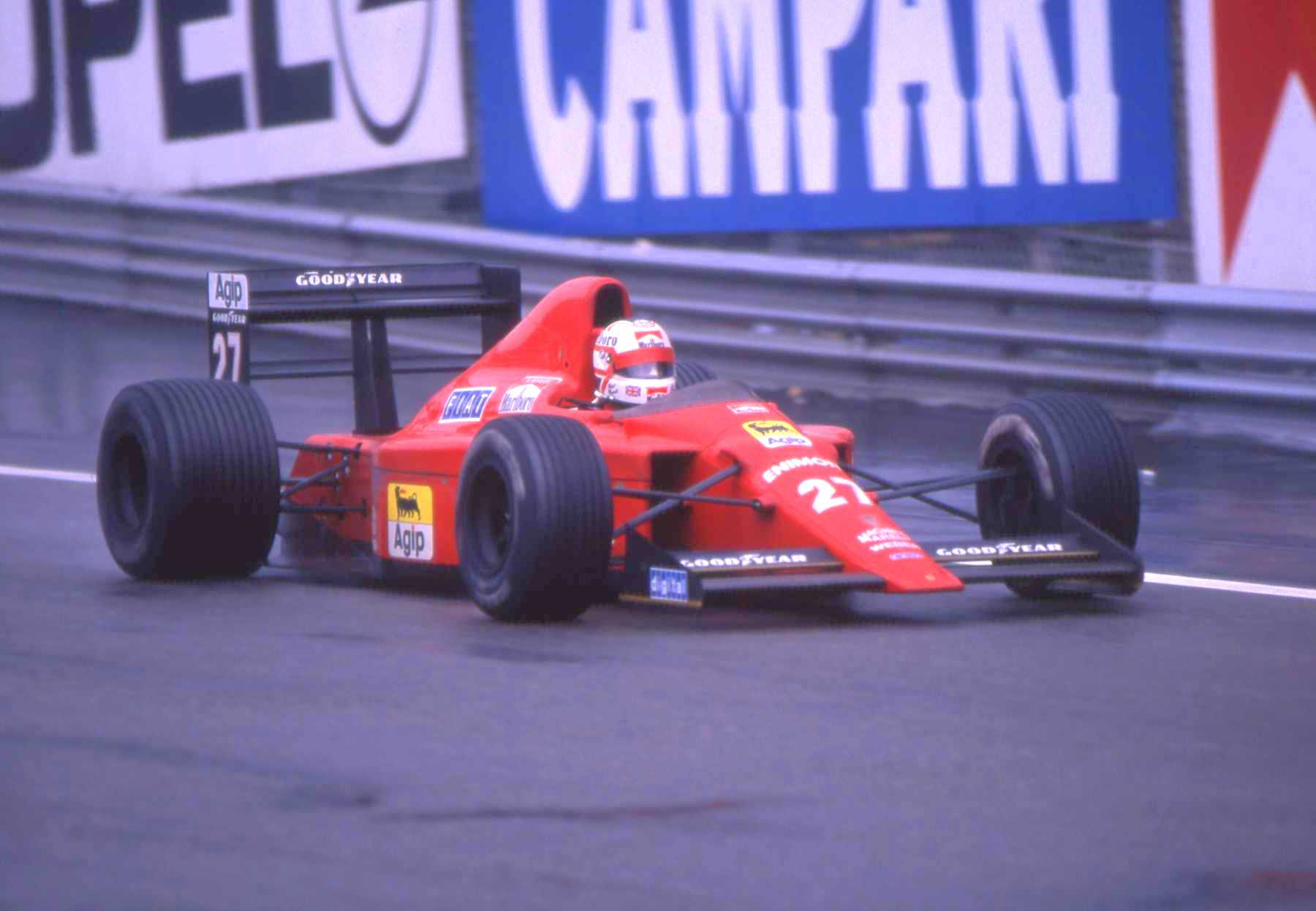
Mansell driving for Ferrari at the 1989 Belgian Grand Prix

Mansell believed that 1989 would be a development year and that he would be able to challenge for the championship the following season. In his first appearance with the team he scored a very unlikely win in the 1989 Brazilian Grand Prix at the Autódromo Internacional Nelson Piquet in Rio de Janeiro; his least favourite track, and the home race of his bitter rival Piquet. He later joked that he had booked an early flight home for halfway through the race as he predicted the car's new electronic gearbox would last only a few laps (as it had done throughout pre-season testing and in qualifying for the race). Mansell became the first driver to win a race in a car with a semi-automatic gearbox. The race saw him as the first driver to win in their debut race for the Scuderia since Mario Andretti had won the 1971 South African Grand Prix and he would remain the last man to win on his Ferrari debut until Kimi Räikkönen won the 2007 Australian Grand Prix.

The rest of 1989 was characterised by gearbox and various other problems, including a disqualification at the Canadian Grand Prix and a black-flagged incident at the Portuguese Grand Prix for reversing in the pit lane, which resulted in a ban for the next race in Spain. However, Mansell finished fourth in the Championship with the help of a second win for Ferrari at the tight and twisty Hungaroring for the Hungarian Grand Prix. Early in practice Mansell had seen that trying to qualify the car high on the grid was a pointless exercise and he decided instead to concentrate on a good race set-up. After qualifying 12th (0.681s behind teammate Gerhard Berger in sixth and 2.225s behind pole man Riccardo Patrese in his Williams-Renault) and not even being considered a chance for the race, he charged his way through the field until he pulled off a sensational passing manoeuvre on the McLaren-Honda of World Champion Ayrton Senna on lap 58 to take a lead he would not lose.

1990

A tough 1990 followed with Ferrari, in which Mansell's car suffered more reliability problems, forcing him to retire from seven races. He was paired with Alain Prost, (who was also the reigning World Champion), and who took over as the team's lead driver. Mansell recalls one incident where at the 1990 British Grand Prix, the car he drove did not handle the same as in the previous race where he had taken pole position. On confronting the mechanics, it transpired that Prost saw Mansell as having a superior car and as a result, they were swapped without telling Mansell. After retiring from the race, he announced he was retiring from the sport altogether at the end of the season. This, combined with the fact that Frenchman Prost was not only a triple World Champion and the winner of more Grands Prix than anyone in history, but also spoke fluent Italian, whereas Mansell's Italian was only conversational at best, gave Prost greater influence within the Maranello-based team. According to Prost, Mansell only attended two or three mechanical briefings throughout the season, preferring playing golf. One notable highlight of the season was a daring pass on Gerhard Berger around the daunting high speed Peraltada corner that was later renamed in his honour. Approaching the corner for the penultimate time Mansell was bobbing from side to side in Berger's mirrors. Heading into one of the quickest corners on the calendar at the time, where the Ferraris had registered forces of 4.7g during practice, Mansell launched to the outside of Berger and flashed past to take second place.

Mansell scored only a single win, at the 1990 Portuguese Grand Prix, finished a thrilling second to Nelson Piquet in Australia and finished fifth in the World Championship. Mansell then announced his retirement from Formula One.

=== 1991–1992: Return to Williams ===
1991

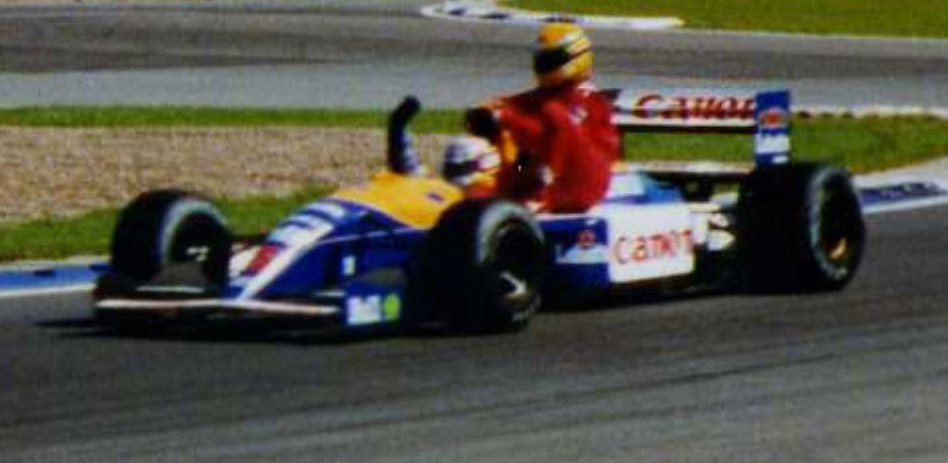
Mansell gives Ayrton Senna a lift after winning the 1991 British Grand Prix.

Mansell's retirement plans were halted when Frank Williams stepped in. Mansell's return to Williams was not straightforward. He would agree to return only if a list of demands were met, including undisputed number one status over Riccardo Patrese (who had remained with the team through 1989 and 1990), guarantees of support in a wide variety of areas with each guarantee in writing, and assurances from suppliers such as Renault and Elf that they would do everything necessary to help him win. Frank Williams said the demands were 'impossible'; Mansell concluded that if that were the case he would be happy to retire. Three weeks later the impossible had happened and Mansell was a Williams driver. Williams signed Mansell on 1 October 1990 after Mansell was assured the contract stated that he would be the focus of the team, having experienced being the 'Number Two' driver at Ferrari. Mansell would be paid £4.6 million a season, a deal which made him the highest paid British sportsman at the time.

Mansell's second stint with Williams was even better than the first. Back in the familiar 'Red 5', he won five races in 1991, including the Spanish Grand Prix. In this race he went wheel-to-wheel with Ayrton Senna, with only centimetres to spare, at over 320 km/h (199 mph) on the main straight. Quite a different spectacle was offered following Mansell's victory in the British Grand Prix at Silverstone. Senna's car had stopped on the final lap, but, rather than leave his rival stranded out on the circuit (the two had come to blows in the pits following their first lap tangle during the 1987 Belgian Grand Prix and were hardly close friends), Mansell pulled over on his victory lap and allowed Senna to ride on the Williams sidepod back to the pits.

The Williams team's decision to develop their new semi-automatic gearbox by racing with it at the start of the season was at the cost of points in the opening rounds of the championship. Senna was on 40 points with four straight wins to open the season by the time Mansell gained his first finish with a second in Monaco. Mansell then had the next race in Canada practically won when his Williams FW14 stopped half a lap from the finish with what was reported to be transmission failure, though it was claimed by designer Adrian Newey that Mansell had let his engine revs drop too low while he was waving to the crowd in celebration and stalled his engine. This handed Nelson Piquet his 23rd and last F1 race win. Despite a good mid-season, which included a hat-trick of victories, Senna's consistency and Mansell's retirements at key races meant that he finished second in the Championship for the third time in his career, this time behind Senna.

1992 - Formula One World Champion

Mansell started the 1992 season with five straight victories (a record not equalled until Michael Schumacher in 2004). At the sixth round of the season in Monaco, he took pole and dominated much of the race. However, with seven laps remaining, Mansell suffered a loose wheel nut and was forced into the pits, emerging behind Ayrton Senna's McLaren-Honda. Mansell, on fresh tyres, set a lap record almost two seconds quicker than Senna's and closed from 5.2 to 1.9 seconds in only two laps. The pair duelled around Monaco for the final four laps but Mansell could find no way past, finishing just 0.2 seconds behind the Brazilian. Mansell broke the record for most wins by a British driver of all time when he won the British Grand Prix at Silverstone, as he surpassed Jackie Stewart's record of 27 wins with his 28th. Mansell was finally crowned Formula One World Champion at the age of 39 early in the season at the Hungarian Grand Prix, the 11th round of that season, where his second-place finish clinched the Drivers' Championship, securing the title in the fewest Grands Prix since the 16-race season format started. Mansell also set the then-record for the most wins in one season (9); both records stood until broken by Schumacher in 2002. He managed 14 pole positions that year at the Brazilian Grand Prix on 26 November, a record only broken by Sebastian Vettel in 2011. He also held the record for the most races before becoming World Champion with 180 races; this record was broken by Nico Rosberg in 2016 with 206 races.

Other Formula One records set in 1992 that Mansell still holds, as of 2025, are: the highest percentage of pole positions in a season (87.5%, 14 out of 16 Grands Prix); most Grand Prix wins before becoming World Champion (29th win achieved at the 1992 German Grand Prix and crowned World Champion with a 2nd place at the 1992 Hungarian Grand Prix); most runner-up championship finishes before becoming World Champion (three, being 1986, 1987 and 1991); most Grands Prix where the same driver started from pole, scored the fastest lap, and crashed out (four, being the 1987 German Grand Prix, 1990 British Grand Prix, 1992 Japanese Grand Prix, and 1992 Italian Grand Prix). Mansell is also the driver with the most wins among those who never won at Monaco (31, having surpassed Jim Clark's previous record of 25 with his 26th win at the 1992 San Marino Grand Prix).

Mansell won the BBC Sports Personality of the Year award again in 1992, one of only four people to have won the award twice.

During this season, Mansell gained a reputation for a psychological competitiveness and mind games. After the announcement by the FIA that the organization would be weighing drivers, Mansell, known for ignoring diet, starved and dehydrated himself the day prior to weigh-ins. This measure led to Mansell weighing less than his teammate Riccardo Patrese by half a kilogram.

Dispute with Williams and departure from F1

Whilst being world champion, Mansell had a public disagreement with Williams. In his autobiography, Mansell writes that this was because of a deal made at the previous Hungarian Grand Prix, which Williams reneged on, and the prospect of his former Ferrari teammate Alain Prost, who had sat out the 1992 season, being his teammate on Williams for the 1993 season.

Mansell's contract was due to expire at the end of the season. According to Patrick Head, Mansell pushed for a contract extension to be agreed early in the season. Despite this being unusual for the team, Mansell's perseverance purportedly paid off, and met with both Frank Williams and Patrick Head at the Williams Motorhome in Jerez, where they discussed and subsequently shook hands on a deal for a further two seasons (1993 and 1994). They followed this up with a written contract sent to Mansell's home address in the Isle of Man for final review and signature. According to Head, Mansell procrastinated on returning the signed agreement however, whilst winning back-to-back races over the upcoming months, finally resulting in Mansell asking for more money, which infuriated and frustrated the Williams leadership team.

According to Mansell, Williams had initially neglected to tell Mansell that Prost had signed for 1993 at only the second race of the 1992 season in Mexico, a position that Mansell felt would be similar to their days together at Ferrari in 1990. To boot, Ayrton Senna had expressed a strong desire to drive for Williams and even offered to drive for them at no salary (only to later be rebuffed as Prost, whose rivalry with the Brazilian was more intense than the one he had with Mansell, had a clause written into his contract which enabled him to block Senna's effort). Williams decided that there was little sense in paying the high fees Mansell went on to demand, and told him that he needed to sign on the original deal or Senna was ready to be signed instead. When Mansell discovered that Senna's potential signing was untrue and a ruse, he decided to move on and called a press conference to announce his retirement. Wiliams made an 11th hour offer to Mansell at the Italian Grand Prix, but by then the damage was done as he retired from F1.

== CART IndyCar World Series ==
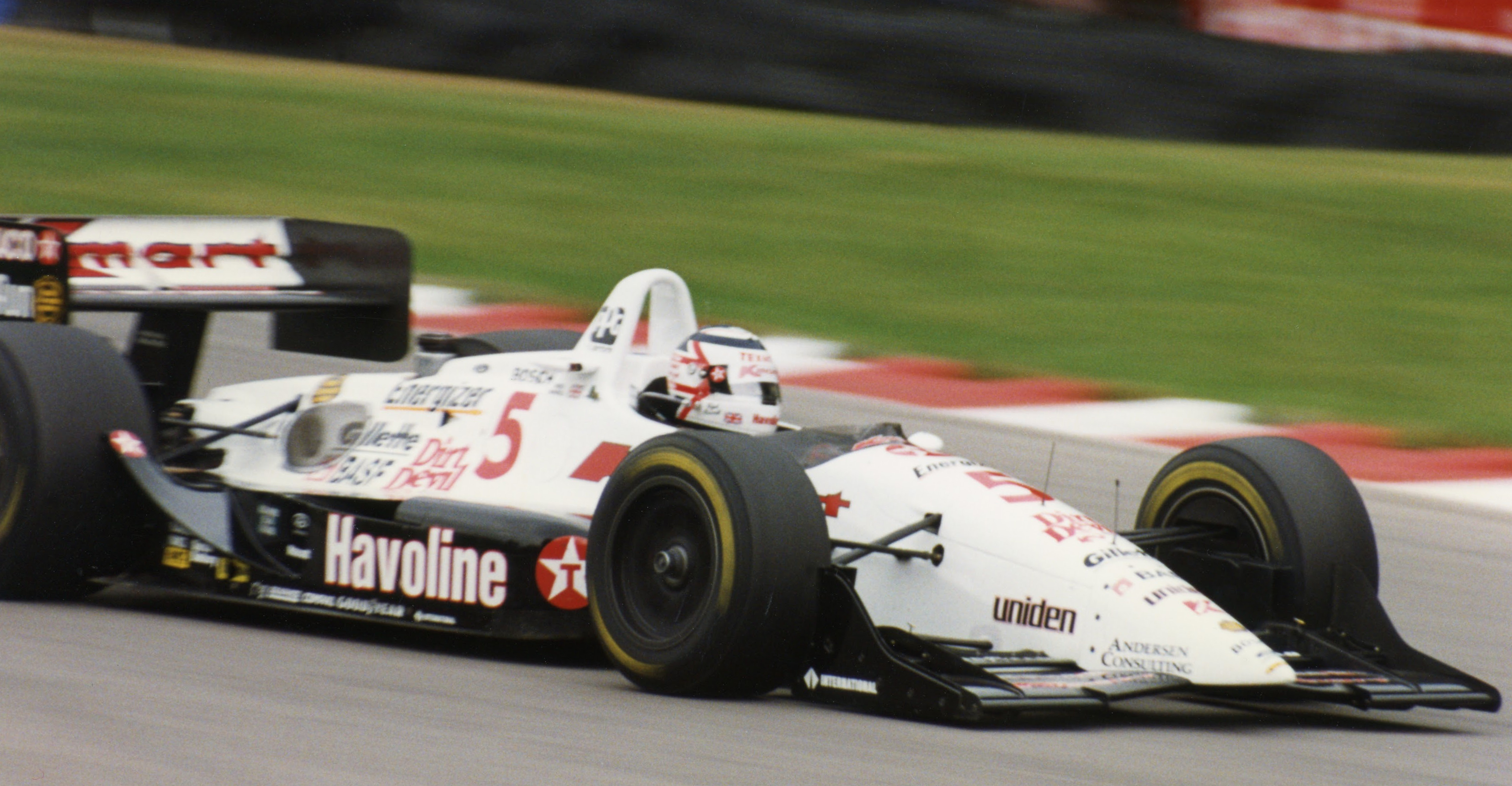
Mansell in the CART series in 1993

Mansell then signed with Newman/Haas Racing to pair with Mario Andretti in the CART series, replacing Mario's son Michael who moved to F1 and McLaren. At the season opener in Surfers Paradise, Australia, he became the first "rookie" to take pole position and win his first race. A few weeks later, he suffered a substantial crash at the Phoenix International Raceway, severely injuring his back. At the 1993 Indianapolis 500, Mansell would lead the race only to finish third after losing the lead to Emerson Fittipaldi and Arie Luyendyk after a poor restart. On his 40th birthday, Mansell would avenge his loss at Indianapolis to score a 200-mile race victory at New Hampshire International Speedway, perhaps his most exciting CART victory. He would go on to score five wins in the 1993 CART season, which, with more high-placed finishes, was good enough to earn him the championship. This enabled Mansell to become the only driver in history to hold both the Formula One and CART championships at the same time; when he won the 1993 CART championship he was still the reigning F1 world champion, the 1993 F1 championship not yet having been decided.

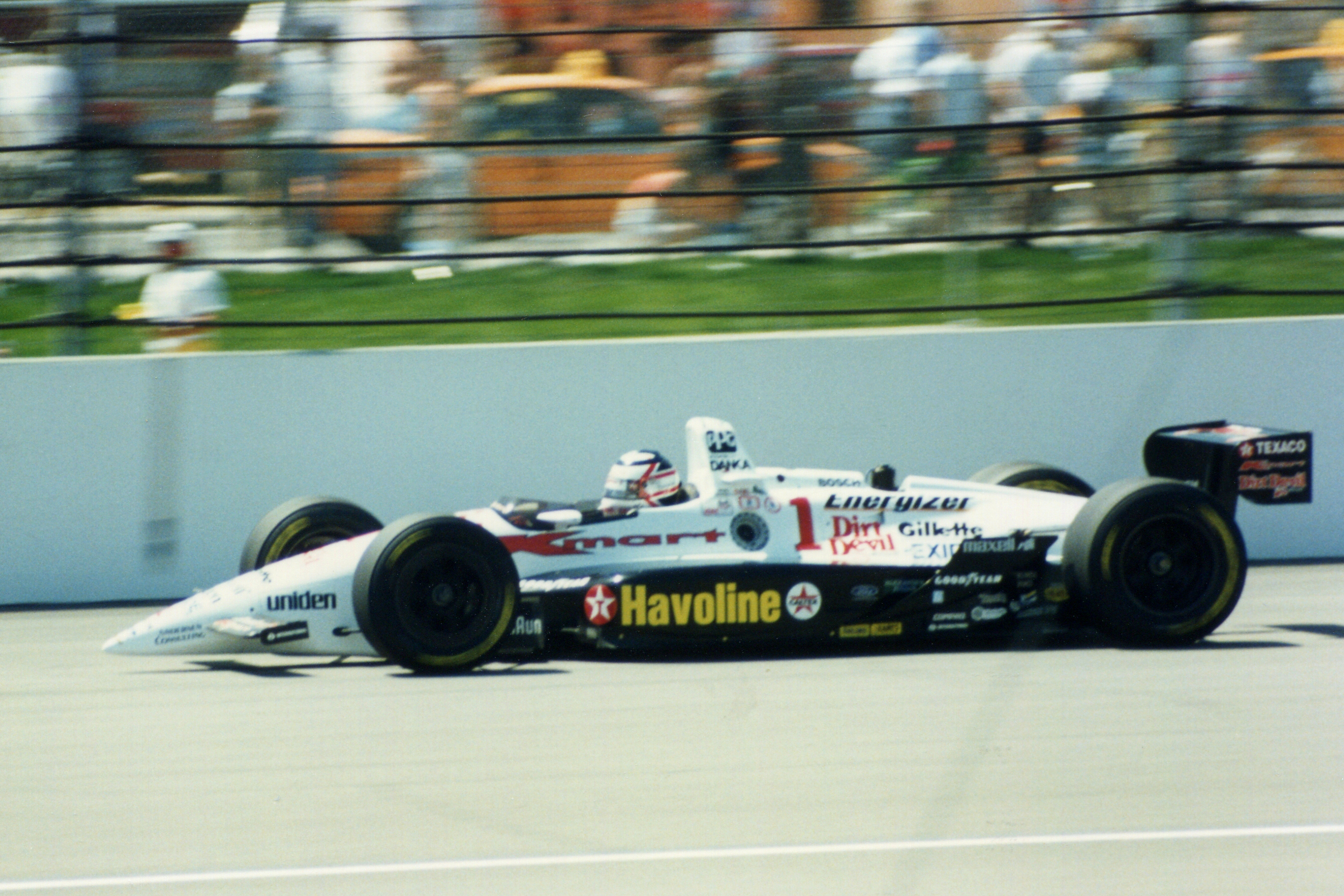
Mansell competing in the 1994 Indianapolis 500

Following this successful season in CART, Mansell received several awards, including a Gold Medal from the Royal Automobile Club and the 1994 ESPY Award for Best Driver.

Mansell's Newman/Haas car was much less reliable the following year, 1994, and results suffered. Mansell was also the catalyst for the breakdown in the relationship between himself and Mario Andretti. Andretti has since remarked "I guess if Ronnie Peterson was the best team-mate I ever had, Nigel Mansell was the worst" and "I had a lot of respect for him as a driver, but not as a man".

== Brief return to Formula One ==
=== 1994: Williams ===
In 1994, after the CART season ended, Mansell returned to F1 and re-joined the Williams team. Since he had left it in 1992, the team had undergone some significant changes. Damon Hill had been promoted from test driver and was running full-time in one car. Prost, Mansell's replacement, won the 1993 Drivers' Championship and then retired after the season. This allowed Williams and Ayrton Senna to finally work out an agreement, and the team received a new sponsor in Rothmans International for a season in which they were expected to remain as champions. However, the car proved unreliable and tricky to handle early in the season, leading Senna to retire from the opening rounds despite claiming pole. In the third race at Imola, Senna was killed in a crash at the Tamburello curve.

Williams test driver David Coulthard took over Senna's seat for the majority of 1994 and Williams got permission from Newman/Haas Racing to bring back Mansell at the French Grand Prix and the final three races of 1994 in Europe, Japan and Australia. Mansell was paid approximately £900,000 per race, compared to teammate Damon Hill being paid £300,000 for the entire season. Mansell's return was helped by Bernie Ecclestone helping unravel his contracts in the United States. It was important for F1 to have a world champion driving that season and with worldwide TV viewing figures starting to decline, they needed Mansell. The 41-year-old was not as quick as Hill in race trim but signs that his speeds were coming back were evident in Japan during a battle with the Ferrari of Jean Alesi. Mansell took his final Grand Prix victory in Adelaide, the last race of the season, having out-qualified the two title contenders at the time, Damon Hill and Michael Schumacher, in the process (helped out by the second qualifying session being held on a wet track, with the times from the first session making up the grid). The plan initially was for Mansell to protect Hill from Schumacher, but both drivers passed him at the start and eventually collided (causing the retirement of both), handing Schumacher his first world title.

Mansell purportedly agreed a new contract to drive for Williams again in 1995, but later claimed this was rescinded. Williams ultimately opted for youth over experience and hired Coulthard for the 1995 season.

=== 1995: McLaren ===
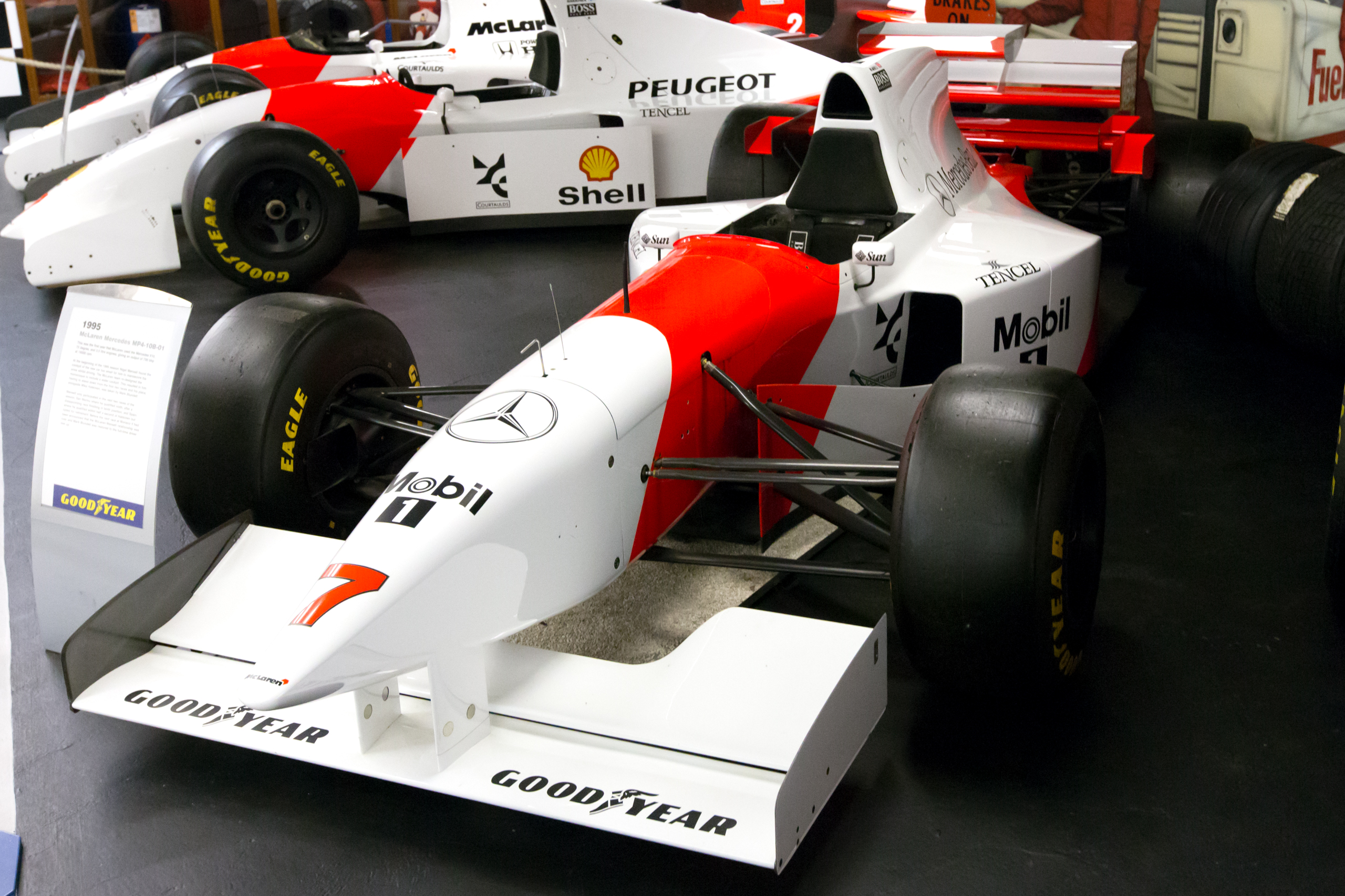
A McLaren MP4/10B, Mansell's last Grand Prix car

After losing the Williams seat to David Coulthard, Mansell signed to drive for McLaren in 1995.

McLaren's title sponsors Marlboro wanted a world champion, whereas McLaren and their engine suppliers Mercedes wanted a lower-profile driver for what was Mercedes' second year back in Formula One since abandoning it in 1955.

Before the season started, Mansell could not fit into the narrow car and was deputised by Mark Blundell for the opening two rounds in Brazil and Argentina. Mansell's car was completed in 33 days and in time for Imola, where despite being in the top-six late in the race, a clash with Eddie Irvine saw him finish tenth and out of the points. The Spanish Grand Prix saw Mansell become frustrated over his car's handling characteristics. He chose to retire after just two races with the team. Mansell cited the decision to retire as his not wanting to make up the numbers and with no hope of the McLaren MP4/10 being competitive. In 2015, Mansell stated that he was wrong to leave McLaren so soon and that in hindsight he should have continued with the team for the season and help improve the car.

=== 1997: Jordan potential comeback ===
A few testing sessions with F1 teams including Jordan suggested another comeback could be on the cards, but it never happened. Reports at the time suggested that the Mansell–Jordan partnership for 1997 was a real possibility with Eddie Jordan's title sponsor willing to pay for the deal. The Jordan team said after the tests in Barcelona in December 1996 that Mansell decided against it.

== British Touring Car Championship ==
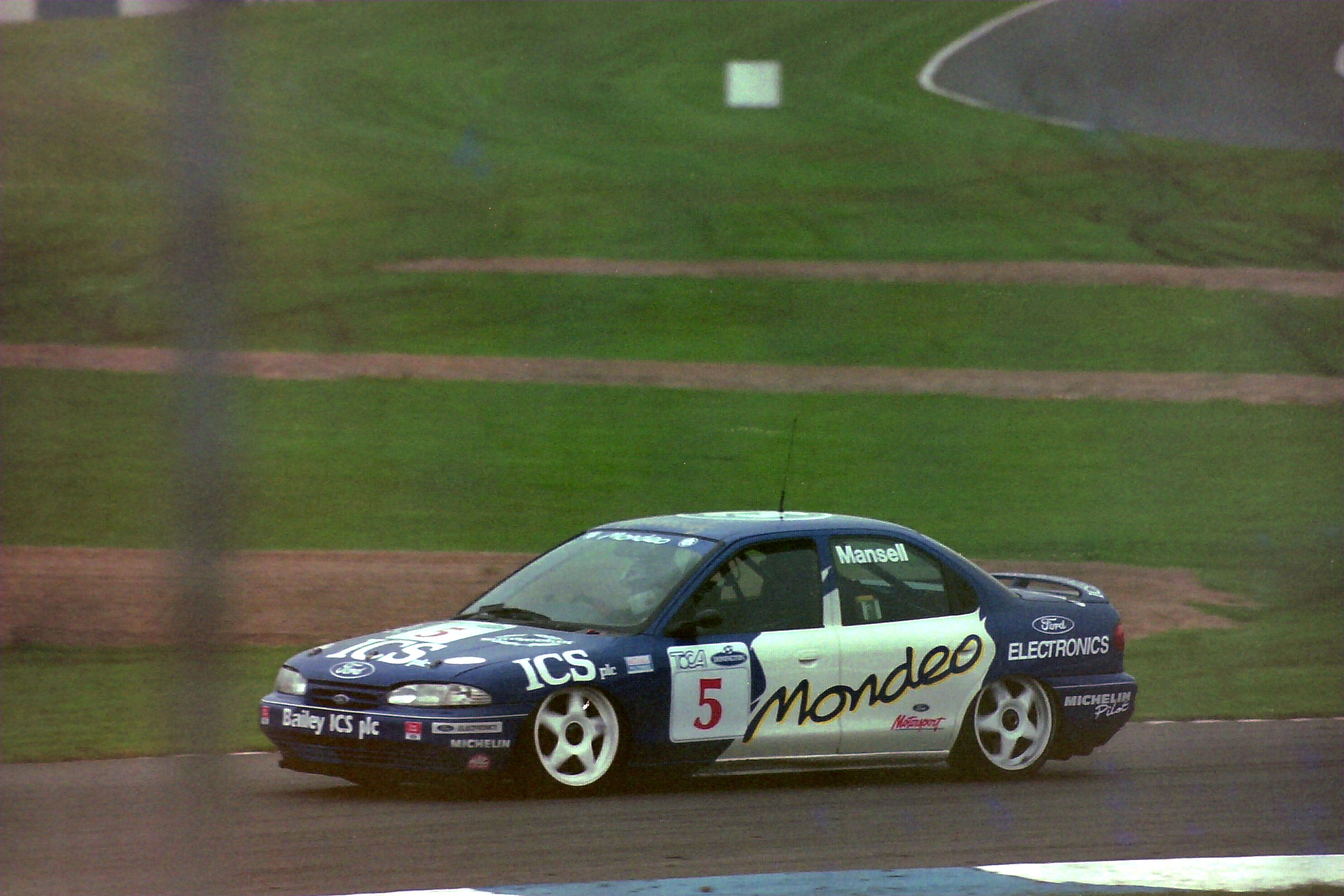
Mansell driving for Ford at Donington Park during the 1993 TOCA Shootout

Mansell took part in the 1993 TOCA Shootout, held at Donington Park. Mansell drove a Ford Mondeo with his usual red number 5. The race ended in disaster for Mansell; he was knocked unconscious following a crash with six laps remaining. He lost control of his car through the exit of the Old Hairpin, over-corrected the slide and collided with Tiff Needell's Vauxhall Cavalier, resulting in a spin and a bad crash into the concrete wall under the bridge.

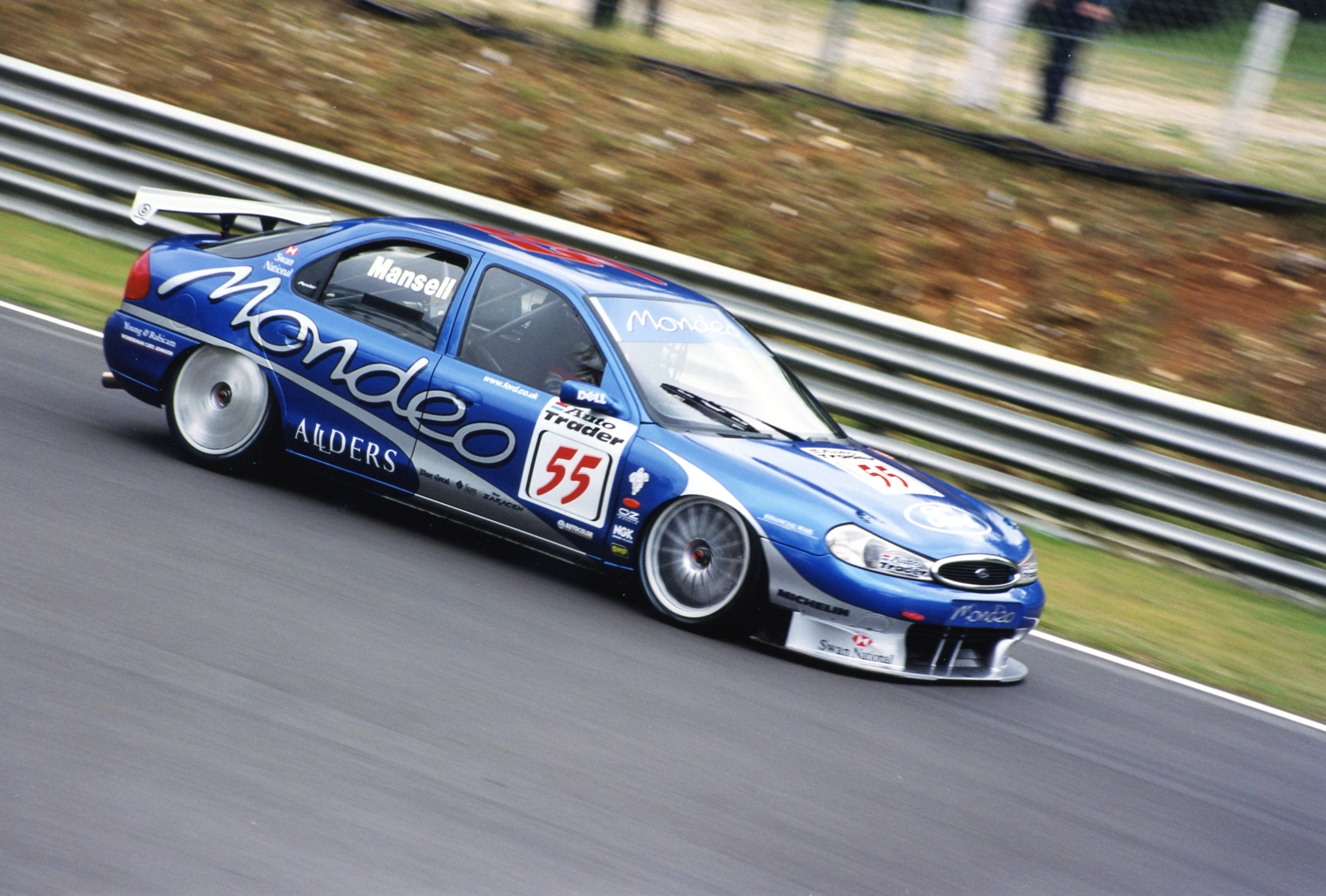
Mansell competing at Brands Hatch in the BTCC

Mansell made a return to racing in 1998 in the British Touring Car Championship, driving in a Ford Mondeo for three rounds. With the number 5 already taken by James Thompson, Mansell raced with the red number 55.

At his first event at Donington Park, Mansell retired three laps into the sprint race, meaning he would start the feature race in 19th position on the grid. As the conditions changed and the track became wetter, Mansell found himself leading the race for several laps, and he finished in fifth position. The race was regarded by many fans as one of the greatest in touring car history.

It was to be his best finish in the series, as Mansell failed to finish either race at the next round he participated in at Brands Hatch, and at his final race at Silverstone he finished in 14th and 11th place. Having competed in three of the 13 rounds, he finished 18th out of 21 in the Drivers' Championship.

== Subsequent appearances ==
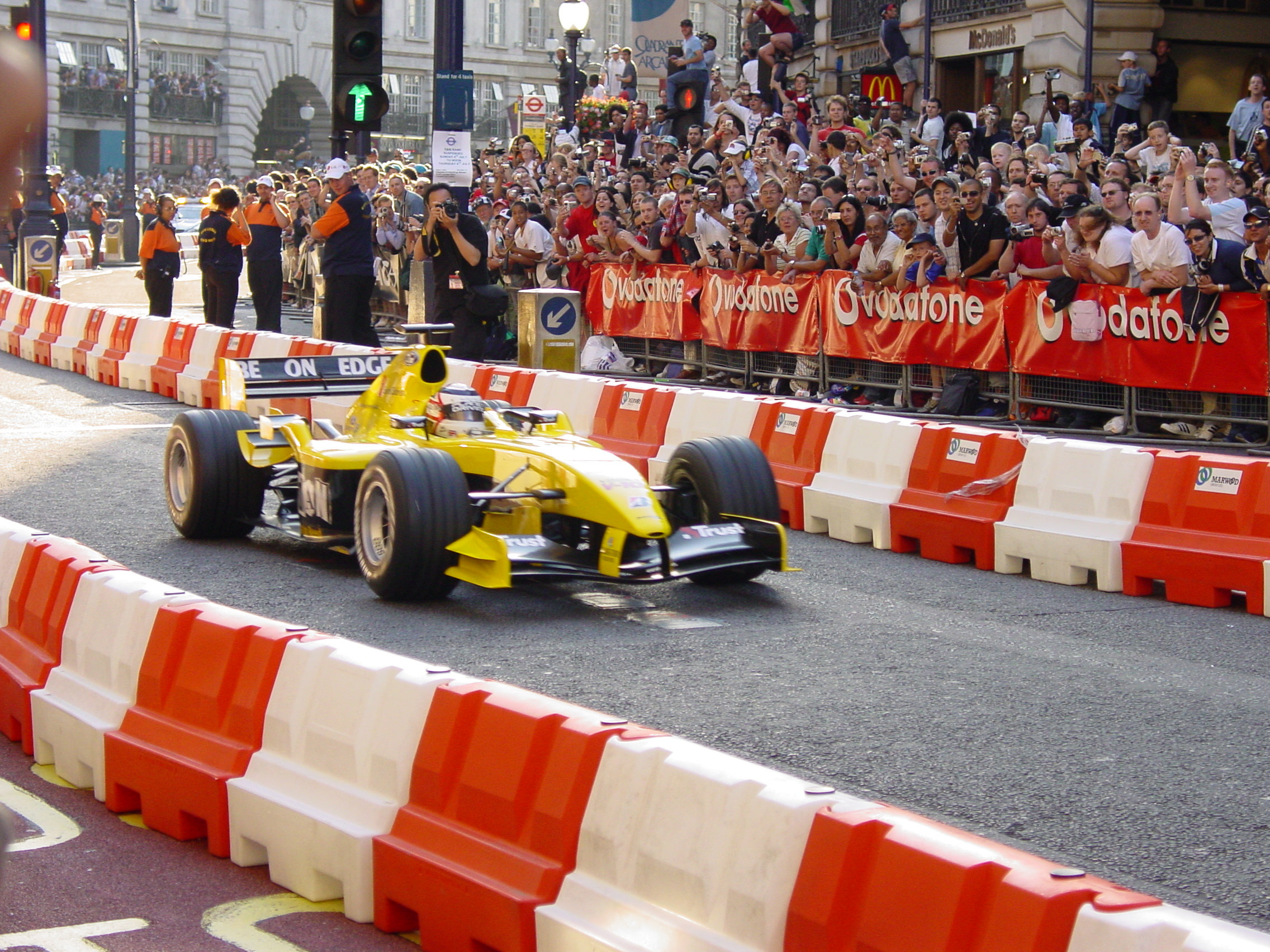
Mansell demonstrating a Jordan EJ14 in London, 2004

On 16 July 2005, Mansell took part in a Race of Legends exhibition event at the Norisring round of the DTM. He competed against other Formula One World Champions Jody Scheckter, Alain Prost and Emerson Fittipaldi, as well as Motorcycle Grand Prix World Champions Mick Doohan and Johnny Cecotto (himself a former F1 driver), each driver having an opportunity to drive Audi, Mercedes and Opel cars. Prost was announced as the winner by the DTM organisers.

Mansell became a financial stakeholder and a driver in the new Grand Prix Masters series. Following a period of testing and developing the car, Mansell made a successful race comeback by winning the inaugural race of the series in Kyalami in November 2005 (Mansell had won at the old Kyalami circuit in 1985 and had also won at the new circuit in 1992). After the success of the race at Kyalami, four dates were scheduled for the GP Masters Series in 2006, including one at Silverstone. Mansell won the season opener at Qatar in April from pole position. The Monza round of the series was cancelled due to noise limitations at the venue, whilst technical issues quickly ruled him out of the Silverstone race.

Also in 2006, Mansell appeared at Brands Hatch, scene of his first Grand Prix win, in October 1985, driving some demonstration laps in the BMW M3 GTR that Andy Priaulx drove to victory in the 2005 24 Hours Nürburgring, as part of the World Touring Car Championship event.

On the weekend of 6 May 2007, Mansell made an appearance in the second round of the FIA GT Championship at Silverstone driving a Ferrari 430 GT2 for the Scuderia Ecosse team. He was paired with Chris Niarchos, finishing seventh in class and 21st overall.

Mansell, with his son Leo, tested a Chamberlain-Synergy team Le Mans prototype Lola-AER B06/10 during the week commencing 14 July 2008, at the Estoril circuit. The pair were said to be considering a drive in the American Le Mans series, possibly commencing as soon as October 2008 in the Petit Le Mans event, although neither driver was in the final field.

On 3 July 2009, Mansell tested his other son Greg's World Series by Renault car at the Silverstone Circuit, setting a best time six seconds off the pace of the fastest driver in the session.

Mansell took part in the last round of the 2009 Le Mans Series, the 1000 km of Silverstone, driving Team LNT's Ginetta-Zytek GZ09S alongside his son Greg and team boss Lawrence Tomlinson.

Mansell raced a Ginetta-Zytek GZ09S in the 2010 24 Hours of Le Mans, alongside his two sons. According to the BBC, this was the first time a father has raced at Le Mans in the same car as his two sons. However, in the race he crashed after only five laps, following a tyre puncture. Reports at the time indicated that he had suffered a concussion, but Mansell later revealed that the accident left him unable to talk or recognise his wife and children. To recover, he took up magic in order to "get [his] brain to work in different ways." Since taking up the hobby, Mansell has become a member of the Magic Circle and gone on to perform around the world, as he explained in a special video interview to mark 30 years since his F1 world-title win in 2022.

For the 2010 Formula One season, the Sporting Regulations were changed so that a former driver sits on the stewards' panel. Mansell took this role at the 2010, 2011, 2012, 2013, 2014, 2015, 2016 British Grands Prix. Also Monaco GP 2012, US GP 2013, Brazil GP 2015.

=== Biographies ===
Mansell has written several autobiographies and books on racing in general:

- In the Driving Seat (1989) (with Derick Allsop)
- Driven to Win (1990)
- Mansell and Williams: Challenge for the Championship (1991)
- Indycar Racing (1993) (with Jeremy Shaw)
- My Story (1995) (with James Allen)
- Staying on Track (2015)

== Television and video games ==
Mansell participated in Prince Edward's charity television special The Grand Knockout Tournament (1987).

There were three video games endorsed by Mansell: Nigel Mansell's Grand Prix (1988, Martech), Nigel Mansell's World Championship Racing (1993, Gremlin Graphics), and Newman/Haas IndyCar (1994). Mansell also appeared as a playable driver for Williams in Codemasters' F1 2013.

Mansell makes a guest appearance in Series 7, Episode 5 of Top Gear, a motoring show presented by Jeremy Clarkson, Richard Hammond, and James May.

In "Eurocrash", Series 5, Episode 2 of The Grand Tour, another motoring show presented by Clarkson, Hammond, and May, Mansell's wax figure is "stolen" from the Polonia Wax Museum in Kraków, Poland and taken with them on their road trip across Central Europe. Despite only appearing as a wax figure, Mansell is also credited as a presenter.

== Personal life ==
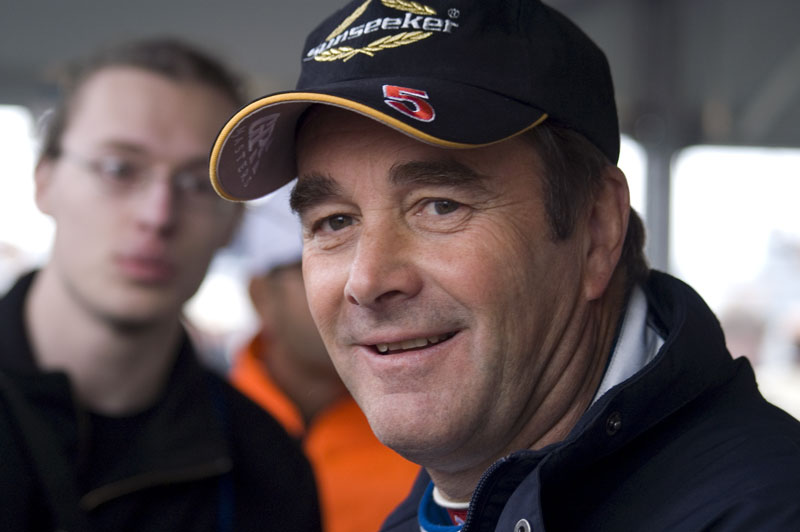
Mansell at the 2007 British Grand Prix, with his trademark moustache shaved off

Mansell married his wife, Roseanne, on 19 April 1975, after having met as college students.

Mansell lived in Port Erin on the Isle of Man during most of his F1 career until 1995. Mansell currently lives in Jersey, Channel Islands. He spent 11 years of his life as a Special Constable on the Isle of Man during his driving career, and in Devon after he retired from racing. During this period, he also developed a golf course in Devon.

A keen golfer, Mansell revealed a desire to compete in The Open Championship and briefly participated in the 1988 Australian Open. In the late 1980s he bought a sports car dealership in Pimperne in Dorset, naming it Nigel Mansell Sports Cars Ltd.

Mansell was the owner of the Team UK Youth cycling team.

Mansell's sons Leo and Greg are also former racing drivers.

In addition to the aforementioned Ferrari F40, Mansell has also owned a bronze left-hand drive 1988 Mercedes-Benz (C126) 560SEC that he used to travel to races in Europe and later sold to art critic Brian Sewell, and a red 1984 Audi Quattro.

=== "Red 5" ===
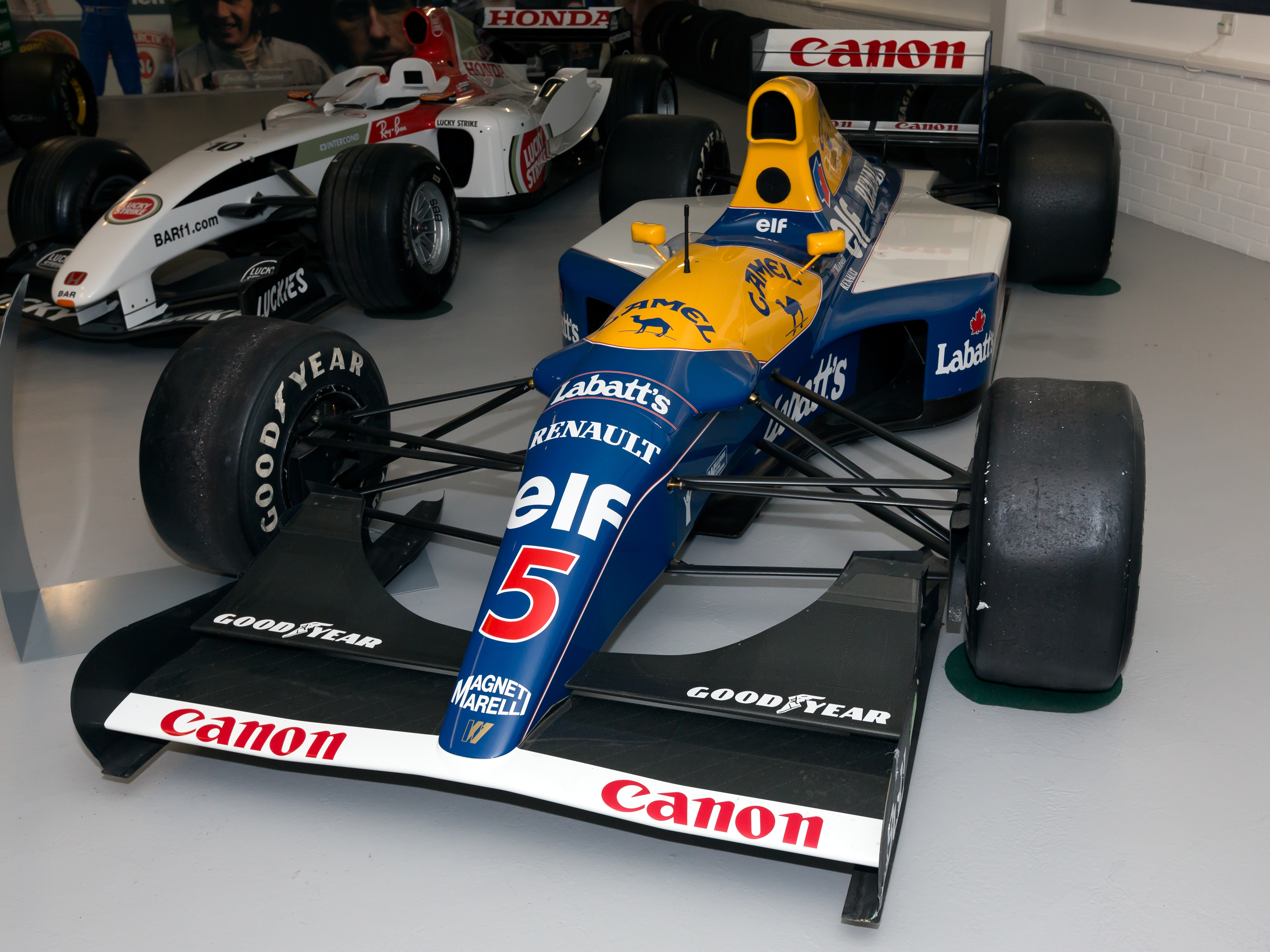
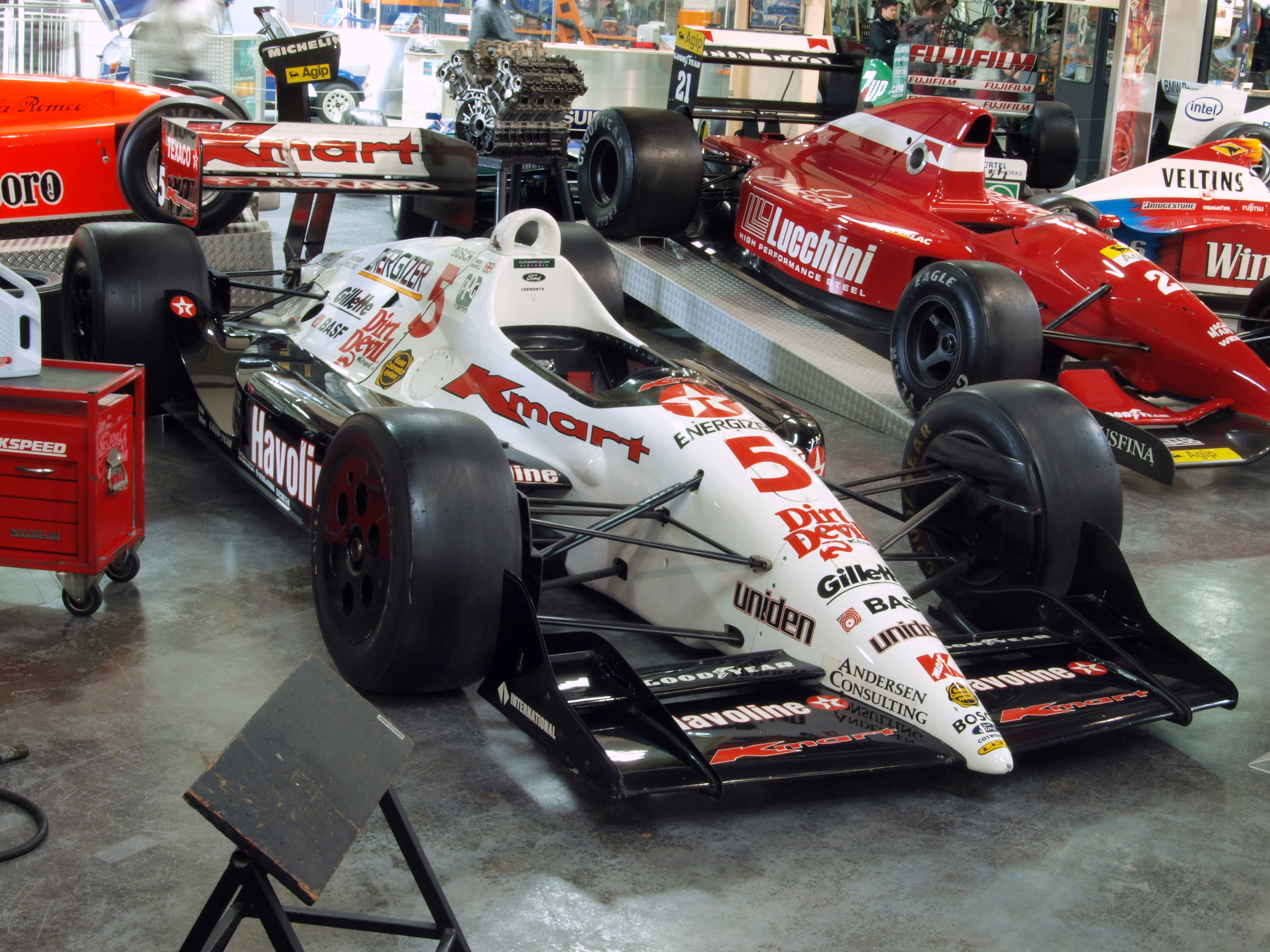
Nigel Mansell's championship winning cars – Williams FW14B (left) and Newman/Haas Lola T93/00 (right) – each featuring "Red 5"

Although teams in motor racing series are generally allocated numbers, Mansell has been associated with the number 5 for many years. This began when he joined Williams in 1985 and was allocated car number 5, as at the time Formula One racing numbers were allocated by constructor and Williams received numbers 5 and 6. For the first four races of the 1985 season, both Williams cars had white numbers, but from a distance the numerals "5" and "6" resembled each other. As a consequence, it was decided to give Mansell's car a red number to make it more distinctive. While this was initially just for recognition, BBC F1 commentator Murray Walker began describing Mansell's car as "Red Five", leading to Mansell retaining the red coloured number throughout his first spell at Williams. On his return to the team in 1991, Williams had retained the number 5 car, allowing Mansell to race as "Red Five" once again. After his departure to CART in 1993 to drive for Newman/Haas, he again ran the red number 5 after Newman/Haas made a deal to acquire it from Penske (it had been Emerson Fittipaldi's race number since 1991). In addition, "Red Five" fitted well into the livery of his Indy car, as Newman/Haas' main sponsors Texaco and Kmart both shared corporate colors of black, white and red. When he returned to Williams for four races in 1994 the team's numbers were 0 and 2 as they had won the Drivers' and Constructors' titles in 1993 but could not run #1 as Alain Prost had retired. Damon Hill drove car #0 while Mansell raced the #2 with the number on the nose of the car painted red (the #2 was white when the car was driven by Ayrton Senna and David Coulthard). So associated with the red 5 is Mansell that, in 2004, he purchased a yacht from Sunseeker, one of his longtime sponsors, which he named Red 5.

== Honours and awards ==
Mansell was awarded the title of BBC Sports Personality of the Year in both 1986 and 1992. Only four other people have won the award more than once, including fellow racing drivers and former F1 World Champions Damon Hill and Lewis Hamilton. Mansell was inducted into the International Motorsports Hall of Fame in 2005. Mansell won the Hawthorn Memorial Trophy, an award for the leading British or Commonwealth driver in F1 each year seven times.

Already an Officer of the Order of the British Empire (OBE), Mansell was appointed a Commander of the Order of the British Empire (CBE) in the 2012 New Year Honours for services to children and young people (as president of UK Youth). He has also received the Special Constabulary Long Service Medal.

In 2015, turn 17 of the Autodromo Hermanos Rodríguez was renamed in honour of Mansell, twice winner of the Mexican Grand Prix (1987 and 1992). He received The London Classic Car Show Icon Award in 2018.

Mansell was inducted into the Motorsports Hall of Fame of America in 2006.

== Racing record ==
=== Career summary ===
Season	Series	Team	Races	Wins	Poles	F/Laps	Podiums	Points	Position
1977	Formula Ford 1600 BRDC		15	5	?	?	?	?	**1st**
1977	Vandervell British Formula Three	Alan McKechnie Racing	2	0	0	0	0	10	17th
1977	Super Visco British Formula Three	Alan McKechnie Racing	2	0	0	0	0	0	NC
1978	Super Visco British Formula Three	March Racing Team	4	0	0	0	0	3	19th
1978	Vandervell British Formula Three	March Racing Team	1	0	1	0	1	15	15th
1979	British Formula Three Championship	Unipart Team	15	1	0	0	2	24	8th
1979	FIA European Formula 3 Championship	Unipart Team	1	0	0	0	0	0	NC
1979	Formula One	Martini Racing Team Lotus	Test driver						
1980	British Formula Three Championship	March Racing Team	8	0	0	1	0	15	9th
1980	European Formula Two	Ralt	4	0	0	0	1	8	12th
1980	Formula One	Team Essex Lotus	3	0	0	0	0	0	NC
1981	Formula One	Team Essex Lotus	4	0	0	0	1	8	14th
1981	Formula One	John Player Team Lotus	10	0	0	0	0	8	14th
1982	Formula One	John Player Team Lotus	13	0	0	0	1	7	14th
1983	Formula One	John Player Special Team Lotus	15	0	0	1	1	10	13th
1984	Formula One	John Player Special Team Lotus	16	0	1	0	2	13	10th
1985	Formula One	Canon Williams Honda Team	15	2	1	1	3	31	6th
1986	Formula One	Canon Williams Honda Team	16	5	2	4	9	72	**2nd**
1987	Formula One	Canon Williams Honda Team	14	6	8	3	7	61	**2nd**
1988	Formula One	Canon Williams Team	14	0	0	1	2	12	9th
1989	Formula One	Scuderia Ferrari	16	2	0	3	6	38	4th
1990	Formula One	Scuderia Ferrari	16	1	3	3	5	37	5th
1991	Formula One	Canon Williams Renault	16	5	2	6	9	72	**2nd**
1992	Formula One	Canon Williams Renault	16	9	14	8	12	108	**1st**
1993	PPG Indy Car World Series	Newman/Haas Racing	16	5	7	4	10	191	**1st**
1994	PPG Indy Car World Series	Newman/Haas Racing	16	0	3	2	3	88	8th
1994	Formula One	Rothmans Williams Renault	4	1	1	0	1	13	9th
1995	Formula One	Marlboro McLaren Mercedes	2	0	0	0	0	0	NC
1998	British Touring Car Championship	Ford Mondeo Racing	6	0	0	0	0	7	18th
2005	Grand Prix Masters	Team Altech	1	1	1	0	1	N/A	**1st**
2006	Grand Prix Masters	Team Altech	2	1	1	0	1	10	**2nd**
2007	FIA GT Championship - GT2	Scuderia Escosse	1	0	0	0	0	2	30th
2009	Le Mans Series - LMP1	Team LNT	1	0	0	0	0	0	NC
2010	Le Mans Series - LMP1	Beechdean Mansell	1	0	0	0	0	12	19th
2010	24 Hours of Le Mans - LMP1	Beechdean Mansell	1	0	0	0	0	N/A	NC

=== Complete European Formula Two Championship results ===
(key) (Races in bold indicate pole position; races in italics indicate fastest lap)

Year	Entrant	Chassis	Engine	1	2	3	4	5	6	7	8	9	10	11	12	Pos.	Pts
1978	Chevron Cars	Chevron B42	Hart	THR	HOC	NÜR	PAU	MUG	VAL	ROU	DON; DNQ	NOG	PER	MIS	HOC	NC	0
1980	Ralt Cars	Ralt RH6	Honda	THR	HOC	NÜR	VAL	PAU	SIL; 11	ZOL; Ret	MUG	ZAN; 5	PER	MIS	HOC; 2	12th	8

=== Complete Formula One World Championship results ===
(key) (Races in bold indicate pole position, races in italics indicate fastest lap)

Year	Entrant	Chassis	Engine	1	2	3	4	5	6	7	8	9	10	11	12	13	14	15	16	17	WDC	Pts
1980	Team Essex Lotus	Lotus 81B	Ford-Cosworth DFV 3.0 V8	ARG	BRA	RSA	USW	BEL	MON	FRA	GBR	GER	AUT; Ret	NED; Ret	ITA; DNQ	CAN	USA				NC	0
1981	Team Essex Lotus	Lotus 81B	Ford-Cosworth DFV 3.0 V8	USW; Ret	BRA; 11	ARG; Ret	SMR; WD	BEL; 3													14th	8
1981	John Player Special Team Lotus	Lotus 87	Ford-Cosworth DFV 3.0 V8						MON; Ret	ESP; 6	FRA; 7	GBR; DNQ	GER; Ret	AUT; Ret	NED; Ret	ITA; Ret	CAN; Ret	CPL; 4			14th	8
1982	John Player Special Team Lotus	Lotus 87B	Ford-Cosworth DFV 3.0 V8	RSA; Ret																	14th	7
1982	John Player Special Team Lotus	Lotus 91	Ford-Cosworth DFV 3.0 V8		BRA; 3	USW; 7	SMR	BEL; Ret	MON; 4	DET; Ret	CAN; Ret	NED	GBR; Ret	FRA	GER; 9	AUT; Ret	SUI; 8	ITA; 7	CPL; Ret		14th	7
1983	John Player Special Team Lotus	Lotus 92	Ford-Cosworth DFV 3.0 V8	BRA; 12	USW; 12																13th	10
1983	John Player Special Team Lotus	Lotus 92	Ford-Cosworth DFY 3.0 V8			FRA; Ret	SMR; 12^{†}	MON; Ret	BEL; Ret	DET; 6	CAN; Ret										13th	10
1983	John Player Special Team Lotus	Lotus 94T	Renault-Gordini EF1 1.5 V6 t									GBR; 4		AUT; 5	NED; Ret	ITA; 8	EUR; 3	RSA; NC			13th	10
1983	John Player Special Team Lotus	Lotus 93T	Renault-Gordini EF1 1.5 V6 t										GER; Ret								13th	10
1984	John Player Special Team Lotus	Lotus 95T	Renault-Gordini EF4 1.5 V6 t	BRA; Ret	RSA; Ret	BEL; Ret	SMR; Ret	FRA; 3	MON; Ret	CAN; 6	DET; Ret	**DAL**; 6^{†}	GBR; Ret	GER; 4	AUT; Ret	NED; 3	ITA; Ret	EUR; Ret	POR; Ret		10th	13
1985	Canon Williams Honda Team	Williams FW10	Honda RA164E 1.5 V6 t	BRA; Ret	POR; 5	SMR; 5	MON; 7	CAN; 6													6th	31
1985	Canon Williams Honda Team	Williams FW10	Honda RA165E 1.5 V6 t						DET; Ret	FRA; DNS	GBR; Ret	GER; 6	AUT; Ret	NED; 6	ITA; 11^{†}	BEL; 2	EUR; 1	**RSA**; 1	AUS; Ret		6th	31
1986	Canon Williams Honda Team	Williams FW11	Honda RA166E 1.5 V6 t	BRA; Ret	ESP; 2	SMR; Ret	MON; 4	BEL; 1	**CAN**; 1	DET; 5	FRA; 1	GBR; 1	GER; 3	HUN; 3	AUT; Ret	ITA; 2	POR; 1	MEX; 5	**AUS**; Ret		**2nd**	**70 (72)**
1987	Canon Williams Honda Team	Williams FW11B	Honda RA167E 1.5 V6 t	**BRA**; 6	SMR; 1	**BEL**; Ret	**MON**; Ret	**DET**; 5	**FRA**; 1	GBR; 1	**GER**; Ret	**HUN**; 14^{†}	AUT; 1	ITA; 3	POR; Ret	ESP; 1	**MEX**; 1	JPN; DNS	AUS		**2nd**	**61**
1988	Canon Williams Team	Williams FW12	Judd CV 3.5 V8	BRA; Ret	SMR; Ret	MON; Ret	MEX; Ret	CAN; Ret	DET; Ret	FRA; Ret	GBR; 2	GER; Ret	HUN; Ret	BEL	ITA	POR; Ret	ESP; 2	JPN; Ret	AUS; Ret		9th	12
1989	Ferrari	Ferrari 640	Ferrari 035/5 3.5 V12	BRA; 1	SMR; Ret	MON; Ret	MEX; Ret	USA; Ret	CAN; DSQ	FRA; 2	GBR; 2	GER; 3	HUN; 1	BEL; 3	ITA; Ret	POR; DSQ	ESP	JPN; Ret	AUS; Ret		4th	38
1990	Ferrari	Ferrari 641	Ferrari 036 3.5 V12	USA; Ret	BRA; 4	SMR; Ret	MON; Ret														5th	37
1990	Ferrari	Ferrari 641/2	Ferrari 037 3.5 V12					CAN; 3	MEX; 2	**FRA**; 18^{†}	**GBR**; Ret	GER; Ret	HUN; 17^{†}	BEL; Ret	ITA; 4	**POR**; 1	ESP; 2	JPN; Ret	AUS; 2		5th	37
1991	Canon Williams Renault	Williams FW14	Renault RS3 3.5 V10	USA; Ret	BRA; Ret	SMR; Ret	MON; 2	CAN; 6^{†}	MEX; 2	FRA; 1	**GBR**; 1	**GER**; 1	HUN; 2	BEL; Ret	ITA; 1	POR; DSQ	ESP; 1	JPN; Ret	AUS; 2		**2nd**	**72**
1992	Canon Williams Renault	Williams FW14B	Renault RS3C 3.5 V10	**RSA**; 1	**MEX**; 1	**BRA**; 1	**ESP**; 1	**SMR**; 1	**MON**; 2	CAN; Ret	**FRA**; 1	**GBR**; 1	**GER**; 1								**1st**	**108**
1992	Canon Williams Renault	Williams FW14B	Renault RS4 3.5 V10											HUN; 2	**BEL**; 2	**ITA**; Ret	**POR**; 1	**JPN**; Ret	**AUS**; Ret		**1st**	**108**
1994	Rothmans Williams Renault	Williams FW16	Renault RS6 3.5 V10	BRA	PAC	SMR	MON	ESP	CAN	FRA; Ret	GBR	GER	HUN	BEL	ITA	POR					9th	13
1994	Rothmans Williams Renault	Williams FW16B	Renault RS6 3.5 V10														EUR; Ret	JPN; 4	**AUS**; 1		9th	13
1995	Marlboro McLaren Mercedes	McLaren MP4/10B	Mercedes FO 110 3.0 V10	BRA	ARG	SMR; 10	ESP; Ret	MON	CAN	FRA	GBR	GER	HUN	BEL	ITA	POR	EUR	PAC	JPN	AUS	NC	0

^{†} Driver did not finish the Grand Prix, but was classified as he completed over 90% of the race distance.

=== American open-wheel racing ===
(key) (Races in bold indicate pole position)

==== PPG Indy Car World Series ====
Year	Team	No.	Chassis	Engine	1	2	3	4	5	6	7	8	9	10	11	12	13	14	15	16	Pos.	Pts	Ref
1993	Newman/Haas Racing	5	Lola T93/00	Ford XB V8 t	**SRF**; 1	PHX; DNS	**LBH**; 3	INDY; 3	MIL; 1	**DET**; 15	**POR**; 2	CLE; 3	TOR; 20	MCH; 1	**NHA**; 1	ROA; 2	VAN; 6	**MDO**; 12	**NAZ**; 1	LAG; 23	1st	191	
1994	Newman/Haas Racing	1	Lola T94/00	Ford XB V8 t	**SRF**; 9	PHX; 3	LBH; 2	INDY; 22	MIL; 5	**DET**; 21	POR; 5	CLE; 2	TOR; 23	**MCH**; 26	MDO; 7	NHA; 18	VAN; 10	ROA; 13	NAZ; 22	LAG; 8	8th	88	

===== Indianapolis 500 =====
Year	Chassis	Engine	Start	Finish	Team
1993	Lola	Ford-Cosworth	8	3	Newman/Haas Racing
1994	Lola	Ford-Cosworth	7	22	Newman/Haas Racing

=== Complete British Touring Car Championship results ===
(key; Races in bold indicate pole position – 1-point awarded all races; Races in italics indicate fastest lap; * signifies that driver led feature race for at least one lap – 1-point awarded)

Year	Team	Car	1	2	3	4	5	6	7	8	9	10	11	12	13	14	15	16	17	18	19	20	21	22	23	24	25	26	Pos	Pts
1998	Ford Mondeo Racing	Ford Mondeo	THR; 1	THR; 2	SIL; 1	SIL; 2	DON; 1	DON; 2	BRH; 1	BRH; 2	OUL; 1	OUL; 2	DON; 1 Ret	DON; 2; 5*	CRO; 1	CRO; 2	SNE; 1	SNE; 2	THR; 1	THR; 2	KNO; 1	KNO; 2	BRH; 1 Ret	BRH; 2 Ret	OUL; 1	OUL; 2	SIL; 1; 14	SIL; 2; 11	18th	7

=== Complete Grand Prix Masters results ===
(key) Races in bold indicate pole position, races in italics indicate fastest lap.

Year	Team	Chassis	Engine	1	2	3	4	5
2005	Team Altech	Delta Motorsport GPM	Nicholson McLaren 3.5 V8	**RSA**; 1				
2006	Team Altech	Delta Motorsport GPM	Nicholson McLaren 3.5 V8	**QAT**; 1	ITA; C	GBR; Ret	MAL; C	RSA; C

=== Complete 24 Hours of Le Mans results ===
Year	Team	Co-Drivers	Car	Class	Laps	Pos.	Class Pos.
2010	(United Kingdom) Beechdean Mansell	(United Kingdom) Greg Mansell (United Kingdom) Leo Mansell	Ginetta-Zytek GZ09S	LMP1	4	DNF	DNF

== Notes ==
Sporting positions
Preceded by Jim Walsh	British Formula Ford Champion; 1977	Succeeded by Peter Morgan
Preceded by Ayrton Senna	Formula One World Champion; 1992	Succeeded by Alain Prost
Preceded by Bobby Rahal	CART Series Champion; 1993	Succeeded by Al Unser Jr.
Awards and achievements
Preceded by Derek Warwick	Hawthorn Memorial Trophy; 1985–1987	Succeeded by Derek Warwick
Preceded by Derek Bell	Autosport; British Competition Driver; 1985–1986	Succeeded by Jonathan Palmer
Preceded by Barry McGuigan	BBC Sports Personality of the Year; 1986	Succeeded by Fatima Whitbread
Preceded by Alain Prost	Autosport; International Racing Driver Award; 1986–1987	Succeeded by Ayrton Senna
Preceded by Martin Brundle	Autosport; British Competition Driver; 1989	Succeeded by Martin Brundle
Preceded by Derek Warwick	Hawthorn Memorial Trophy; 1989–1992	Succeeded by Damon Hill
Preceded by Martin Brundle	Autosport; British Competition Driver; 1991	Succeeded by Derek Warwick
Preceded by Liz McColgan	BBC Sports Personality of the Year; 1992	Succeeded by Linford Christie
Preceded by Ayrton Senna	Autosport; International Racing Driver Award; 1992–1993	Succeeded by Damon Hill
Preceded by Lyn St. James	Indianapolis 500 Rookie of the Year; 1993	Succeeded by Jacques Villeneuve
Preceded by Stefan Johansson	CART Rookie of the Year; 1993	Succeeded by Jacques Villeneuve
