= Nigel Mansell's World Championship Racing =

1992 video game

- Developer: Gremlin Graphics
- Publishers: Gremlin Graphics: Gremlin Interactive (DOS) Game Boy; EU: Nintendo; NA: GameTek SNES; JP: Infocom; NA: GameTek; EU: Nintendo NES; NA: GameTek; EU: Gremlin Interactive Genesis; NA: GameTek; EU: Konami
- Producer: Mark Glossop
- Designer: Matt Donkin
- Programmers: Ritchie Brannan; Damian Hibbard; Graeme Ing; Michael Hirst
- Artist: Damon Godley
- Composers: Richard Ede; Pat Phelan
- Series: Nigel Mansell
- Platform: Amiga: Amiga CD32, Amstrad CPC, Atari ST, Game Boy, MS-DOS, NES, Sega Genesis, SNES, ZX Spectrum
- Release: 1992: 1993 (CD32/CPC/DOS/ZX Spectrum) Game Boy; EU: 1992; NA: August 1993 SNES; JP: 19 March 1993; NA: 1 July 1993; EU: 16 December 1993 NES; NA: October 1993; EU: 1993 Genesis; NA: November 1993; EU: 1994
- Genre: Racing
- Mode: Single-player

Nigel Mansell's World Championship Racing (Note: Also known as Nigel Mansell's World Championship in Europe and as Nigel Mansell's F-1 Challenge (Japanese: ナイジェル・マンセル Ｆ１チャレンジ, Hepburn: Naijeru Manseru F-1 Charenji) in Japan on the Super Famicom.) is an arcade-style Formula One racing video game developed by Gremlin Graphics and released for various systems. The game was largely successful on Amiga and DOS platforms, and was consequently ported to home consoles.

== Gameplay ==
Gameplay screenshot (SNES version)

The player can race a single race, participate in a season of Formula One, or practice their skills on a particular race track. The changing of the tyres is mandatory in the pit lane during the middle of each race, and weather can determine whether the player should use hard tyres, soft tyres, or rain tyres. Before the beginning of the race, it is possible to change some aspects of the car, such as spoilers, tyres and gearbox.

Being licensed by Nigel Mansell, the game followed the 1992 Formula One season, which he won. The player takes on Mansell's role to try to win the title against eleven other real-life drivers that were still active in their careers by the time the game was launched. Like Sega's own Super Monaco GP, each of them belongs to their own team (instead of the common F1 format of two drivers per constructor).

Although all the rival cars' colors resemble the actual constructors' colors by that time, only Mansell character wears a suit in the same color of his team's — blue. Mansell is also the only character to have his own sprite, distinguished by his signature mustache and cap. All the other drivers are shown with a similar sprite, all of them in yellow racing suits.

The player also has the option to change Mansell character by setting a different name and nationality. The countries available on custom mode are South Africa, Mexico, Brazil, Spain, Finland, Monaco, Canada, France, the United Kingdom, Germany, Hungary, Belgium, Italy, Portugal, Japan, Australia, Austria, and the United States. However, the playable character's appearance will remain that of Mansell. The game also features the national anthem for each of these countries, played in the podium whenever the player character wins a race. If a rival wins the race but the player finishes as runner-up or third place, the podium will still be shown, but the anthem to be played will be that of the winning driver's home country. The rivals cannot be customized.

== Ports ==
A port of the game was in development by Gremlin Graphics for the Atari Jaguar after they were signed to be a third-party developer by Atari Corporation for the system in November 1993 and was slated for a Q2 1995 release, but this version was never released for unknown reasons. A Commodore 64 version was also in development but cancelled as it was taking too long; the unreleased game has since been recovered.

== Reception ==
Reception

Review scores
Publication	Score
Computer Gaming World	1.5/5
Power Unlimited	68/100

Award
Publication	Award
Sinclair User	Gold

Rating the game 1.5 stars out of five, Computer Gaming World in August 1994 said that despite the product endorsement, Nigel Mansell "is at best a mediocre attempt at a racing simulation" that should have been released five years earlier. The magazine recommended Lotus III: The Ultimate Challenge for arcade racing and World Circuit as a racing simulation. Power Unlimited gave a score of 68% summarizing: "Mediocre racing game that does not exploit the 32-bit platform in any way. No live video, no replays, no superior in-game graphics. The only advantage is the large number of setting options. Could have been much better."

== See also ==
- Newman/Haas IndyCar featuring Nigel Mansell
