= Ayrton Senna =

Brazilian racing driver (1960–1994)

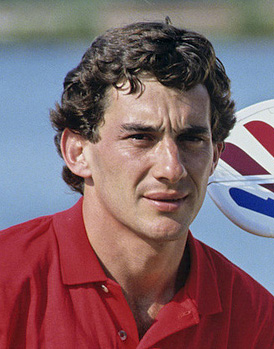
- Undated photo of Senna
- Born: Ayrton Senna da Silva; 21 March 1960; São Paulo, Brazil
- Died: 1 May 1994 (aged 34); Bologna, Emilia-Romagna, Italy
- Cause of death: Injuries sustained at the 1994 San Marino Grand Prix
- Resting place: Cemitério do Morumbi
- Spouse: Lilian de Vasconcelos Souza (m. 1981; div. 1982)
- Partners: Adriane Yamin (1985–1988); Xuxa (1988–1990); Adriane Galisteu (1993–1994; his death)
- Relatives: Viviane Senna (sister); Bruno Senna (nephew)

Formula One World Championship career
- Nationality: (Brazil) Brazilian
- Active years: 1984–1994
- Team(s): Toleman, Lotus, McLaren, Williams
- Entries: 162 (161 starts)
- Championships: 3 (1988, 1990, 1991)
- Wins: 41
- Podiums: 80
- Career points: 610 (614) (Note: Up until 1990, not all points scored by a driver contributed to their final World Championship tally (see list of points scoring systems for more information). Numbers without parentheses are Championship points; numbers in parentheses are total points scored.)
- Pole positions: 65
- Fastest laps: 19
- First entry: 1984 Brazilian Grand Prix
- First win: 1985 Portuguese Grand Prix
- Last win: 1993 Australian Grand Prix
- Last entry: 1994 San Marino Grand Prix

Ayrton Senna da Silva (Brazilian Portuguese: [aˈiʁtõ ˈsẽnɐ dɐ ˈsiwvɐ]; 21 March 1960 – 1 May 1994) was a Brazilian racing driver and philanthropist who competed in Formula One from 1984 to 1994. Senna won three Formula One World Drivers' Championship titles with McLaren, and—at the time of his death—held the record for most pole positions (65), among others; he won 41 Grands Prix across 11 seasons.

Born and raised in São Paulo, Senna began competitive kart racing aged 13; his first go-kart was built by his father using a lawnmower engine. After twice finishing runner-up at the Karting World Championship, Senna progressed to Formula Ford in 1981, dominating the British and European championships in his debut seasons. He then won the 1983 British Formula Three Championship amidst a close title battle with Martin Brundle, further winning the Macau Grand Prix that year. Senna signed for Toleman in 1984, making his Formula One debut at the Brazilian Grand Prix. After scoring several podium finishes in his rookie season, Senna moved to Lotus in 1985 to replace Nigel Mansell, taking his maiden pole position and victory at the rain-affected Portuguese Grand Prix, a feat he repeated in Belgium. He remained at Lotus for his 1986 and 1987 campaigns, scoring multiple wins in each and finishing third in the latter World Drivers' Championship.

Senna signed for McLaren in 1988 to partner Alain Prost; together, they won 15 of 16 Grands Prix held that season—driving the Honda-powered MP4/4—with Senna taking his maiden championship by three points after winning a then-record eight Grands Prix. (Note: In the 1981 to 1990 points system, each driver's best 11 results counted towards the Drivers' Championship. With all results counted, Prost scored 105 points to Senna's 94.) Their fierce rivalry culminated in title-deciding collisions at Suzuka in 1989 and 1990, despite Prost's move to Ferrari in the latter, with Prost winning the former title and Senna taking the following. Senna took seven victories, including his home Grand Prix in Brazil, as he secured his third title in 1991. The dominant Williams–Renault combination prevailed throughout his remaining two seasons at McLaren, with Senna achieving several race wins in each, including his record-breaking sixth Monaco Grand Prix victory in 1993 on his way to again finishing runner-up to Prost in the championship. Senna negotiated a move to Williams for his 1994 campaign, replacing the retired Prost to partner Damon Hill.

During the 1994 San Marino Grand Prix at Imola, Senna was killed in a crash whilst leading the race, driving the Williams FW16. His state funeral was attended by about 3 million people. Following subsequent safety reforms, he was the last fatality in the Formula One World Championship until Jules Bianchi in 2014. Senna achieved 41 wins, 65 pole positions, 19 fastest laps and 80 podiums in Formula One; he remains a legendary figure within motorsport for his raw speed and uncompromising driving style, as well as his philanthropy, and is frequently cited as a national hero of Brazil. (Note: Per several sources:) He was also widely acclaimed for his wet-weather performances, such as at the 1984 Monaco, 1985 Portuguese and 1993 European Grands Prix. Senna was inducted into the International Motorsports Hall of Fame in 2000 and into the Automotive Hall of Fame in 2025.

== Early life ==
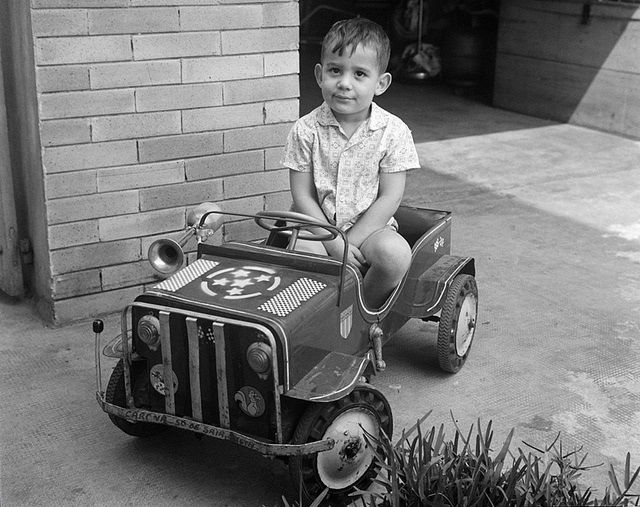
Senna at his family home in 1963

Ayrton Senna was born at 2:35 BRT on 21 March 1960, in the Pro-Matre Maternity Hospital of Santana, a neighbourhood of São Paulo. The middle child of a wealthy Brazilian family, he was born to landowner and factory owner Milton Guirado da Silva and his wife Neide Joanna Senna da Silva; he had an older sister, Viviane, and a younger brother, Leonardo. Senna was of Italian, Spanish, and Portuguese descent: his mother was the granddaughter of Italian immigrants, and his father was the son of a Brazilian father of Portuguese Quatrocentão descent and a Spanish mother from Tíjola, Andalusia.

The house where Senna spent the first four years of his life belonged to his maternal grandfather, João Senna, located less than 100 metres (330 ft) from Campo de Marte, where his family operated the Aeronautics Material park and an airport. Senna was highly athletic—excelling in gymnastics and other sports—and developed an interest in cars and motor racing by the age of four. He had poor motor coordination and had trouble climbing stairways by the age of three; an electroencephalogram showed no abnormalities. Senna's parents nicknamed him Beco. At the age of seven, Senna first learned to drive a Jeep around his family's farm and also how to change gears without using a clutch.

Senna attended the Colégio Rio Branco in the São Paulo neighbourhood of Higienópolis and graduated in 1977 with a grade 5 in physics, alongside other grades in mathematics, chemistry, and English. He later enrolled in a college that specialised in business administration, but dropped out after three months with an average grade of 68%.

== Junior racing career ==
=== Karting (1973–1980) ===
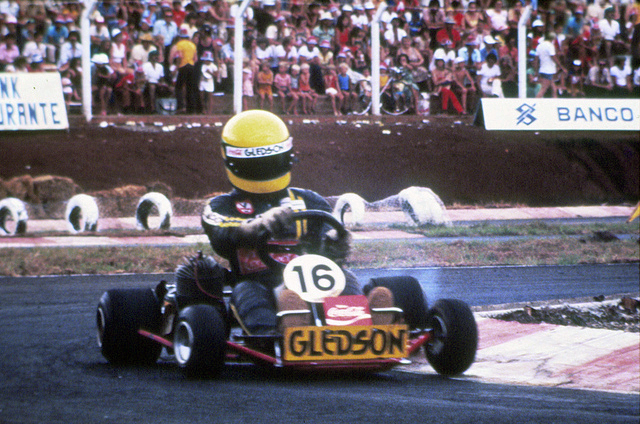
Senna began kart racing at 13.

Senna's first go-kart was built by his father, who operated an automotive factory, using a small 1 hp lawnmower engine. Senna started racing at Interlagos and entered his first kart racing competition at the age of 13. He started his debut race on pole position, against drivers who were several years older than him; he managed to lead most of the race before retiring after colliding with an opponent. His father supported him throughout his karting career, with Lucio Pascal Gascon becoming his manager.

Senna won the South American Kart Championship in 1977. He contested the Karting World Championship five times from 1978 to 1982, finishing runner-up in 1979 and 1980. From 1978 to 1980, he was the teammate and rival of Terry Fullerton at DAP; their fierce rivalry saw several 1–2 finishes in major competitions. Senna later stated that Fullerton was the rival he got the most satisfaction racing against, owing to the lack of money and politics at that level, describing it as "pure racing".

=== Lower formulae (1981–1983) ===
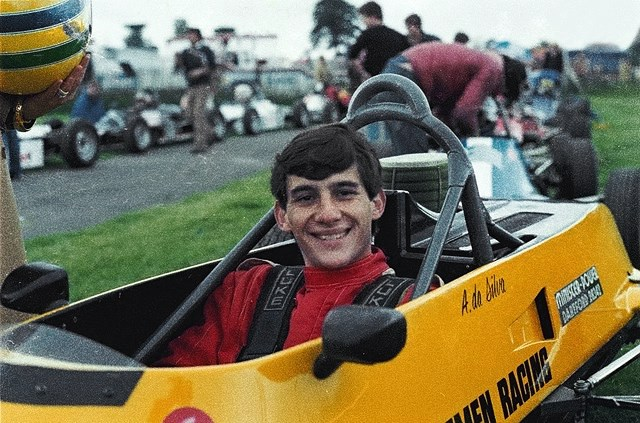
Senna won the 1981 British Formula Ford Championship with Van Diemen.

In 1981, Senna moved to Eaton, a suburb of Norwich in England, to pursue an open-wheel racing career; he began his career in Formula Ford 1600, winning the British and Townsend Thoresen Championships that year with Van Diemen, amid a fractious rivalry with teammate Enrique Mansilla.

At the end of that season, under pressure from his parents to take up a role in the family business, Senna announced his retirement from Formula Ford and returned to Brazil. Before leaving England, Senna was offered a drive with a two-litre Formula Ford team—Rushen Green Racing—for £10,000. Back in Brazil, he decided to take this offer and returned to live in England. As da Silva is the most common Brazilian surname, he adopted his maternal surname, Senna. For 1982, Senna arrived with sponsorship from Banerj and Pool, dominating the British and European Championships, winning 15 of 17 races held at the former.

In 1983, Senna drove in the British Formula Three Championship for West Surrey Racing. He dominated the first half of the season until Martin Brundle, driving a similar car for Eddie Jordan Racing, closed the gap in the second part of the championship. Senna won the title at the final round after a closely fought and, at times, contentious battle with Brundle. In November that year, Senna also triumphed at the inaugural Macau Formula Three Grand Prix with the Toyota-powered Theodore Racing Team, owned by Teddy Yip. Senna was managed for most of his junior career by Armando Teixeira, who was assisted by Domingos Piedade.

== Formula One career ==
=== Toleman (1984) ===
==== Rookie testing ====
Ahead of the 1984 season, Senna was linked to many Formula One teams but received very few offers he liked. He had previously declined a long-term contract from McLaren, and that door was formally closed when Alain Prost (unexpectedly fired by Renault after finishing runner-up in 1983) received the second McLaren seat. He was also linked to Lotus and Brabham, but both teams' title sponsors (Imperial Tobacco / John Player & Sons for Lotus and Parmalat for Brabham) wanted drivers from their respective home countries, so Lotus retained Nigel Mansell and Brabham signed brothers Teo and Corrado Fabi. In addition, Brabham's lead driver, Nelson Piquet, vetoed Senna from Brabham and arranged for the team to sign his friend Roberto Moreno as the test driver. Consequently, Senna joined Toleman, a relatively new team, using less competitive Pirelli tyres. He was paired with Venezuelan Johnny Cecotto, a former Grand Prix motorcycle racing world champion.

In 1983, Senna tested for McLaren, Brabham, Williams, and Toleman, although Williams also lacked a vacancy. Both Williams boss Frank Williams and McLaren boss Ron Dennis observed that Senna insisted on running their cars before anyone else, (other than their regular drivers such as Keke Rosberg) so that he would have the best chance of a good showing by having a fresh car. During his test for Williams at Donington Park, Senna completed 40 laps and was quicker than the other drivers, including Rosberg, Williams's reigning World Champion.

==== Debut season ====
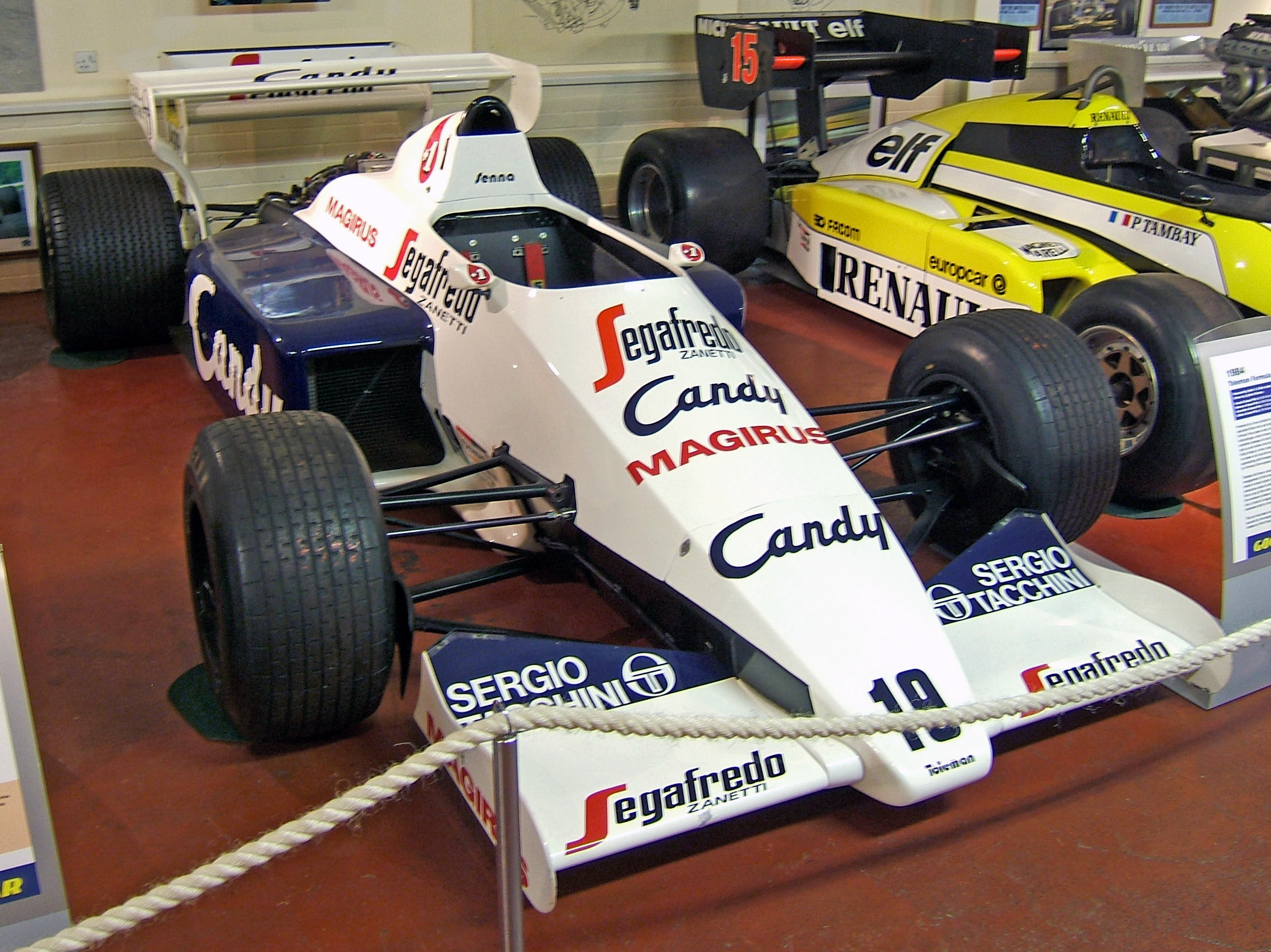
Senna's Toleman TG184 from 1984 on display in the Donington Grand Prix Collection

Senna made his debut at the Brazilian Grand Prix in Rio de Janeiro, where he qualified 17th but retired when the Hart 415T turbocharger failed on lap 8. He scored his first World Championship point when he finished sixth in his second race at the South African Grand Prix at Kyalami with severe cramp in his neck and shoulders, and replicated that result two weeks later at the Belgian Grand Prix. A combination of tyre issues and a fuel-pressure problem resulted in his failure to qualify for the San Marino Grand Prix, the only time this happened during his career. Toleman decided not to run both cars during Friday qualifying at Imola due to a dispute with tyre supplier Pirelli (Toleman were in the process of switching from Pirelli to Michelin). Senna then suffered a fuel-pressure problem in the wet Saturday session at Tosa (the furthest point on the circuit from the pits) and did not have enough time for it to be fixed to allow him to make the grid.

Senna's best result of the season came at the Monaco Grand Prix, the first wet-weather race of the season. Qualifying 13th on the grid, he made steady progress in climbing through the field, passing Niki Lauda for second on lap 19. He quickly began to cut the gap to race leader Alain Prost. Before he could attack Prost, the race was stopped on lap 31 for safety reasons, as the rain had grown even heavier. At the time the race was stopped, Senna was catching Prost by about 4 seconds per lap (while the Tyrrell-Ford of Stefan Bellof was catching both at the same rate, although he was later disqualified due to weight restrictions broken by Tyrrell).

Early on his career, Senna developed a reputation for providing very specific technical details about the performance of his cars and track conditions long before the advent of telemetry. This skill led Toleman's Pat Symonds, Senna's first Formula One race engineer, to regard the Dallas Grand Prix as the initial highlight of Senna's debut season, instead of Monaco. In an interview, Symonds recalled:

The car was reasonably competitive there, so we expected to have a good race, but Ayrton spun early in the race. He then found his way back through the field in a quite effective way and we were looking for a pretty good finish, but then he hit the wall, damaged the rear wheel and the driveshaft and retired, which was a real shame. The real significance of that was that when he came back to the pits he told me what happened and said "I'm sure that the wall moved!" And even though I've heard every excuse every driver has ever made, I certainly hadn't heard of that one! But Ayrton being Ayrton, with his incredible belief in himself, the absolute conviction, he then talked me into going with him after the race to have a look at the place where he had crashed. And he was absolutely right, which was the amazing thing! Dallas being a street circuit, the track was surrounded by concrete blocks and what had happened – we could see it from the tyre marks – was that someone had hit at the far end of the concrete block and that made it swivel slightly, so that the leading edge of the block was standing out by a few millimetres. And he was driving with such precision that those few millimetres were the difference between hitting the wall and not hitting the wall. While I had been, at first, annoyed that we had retired from the race through a driver error, when I saw what had happened, when I saw how he had been driving, that increased my respect for the guy by quite a lot.

That season, Senna took two more podium finishes—third at the British and Portuguese Grands Prix—and placed ninth in the Drivers' Championship with 13 points overall. He did not take part in the Italian Grand Prix after he was suspended by Toleman for being in breach of his contract by entering talks with Lotus for 1985 without informing the Toleman team first. Although Senna did have a £100,000 buyout clause in his contract, the team had to be informed before discussions with another team started. Senna became the first driver Lotus had signed that was not personally chosen by team founder Colin Chapman, who had died in 1982.

Senna had some health issues during the season. Concerned about his low weight, he hired Nuno Cobra to assess his physical condition. By the end of the year, Senna had developed Bell's palsy, possibly from a virus. One side of his face had become completely paralysed; Sid Watkins gave Senna steroids to preserve the possibility of recovery.

=== Lotus (1985–1987) ===
==== 1985: First pole positions and wins ====
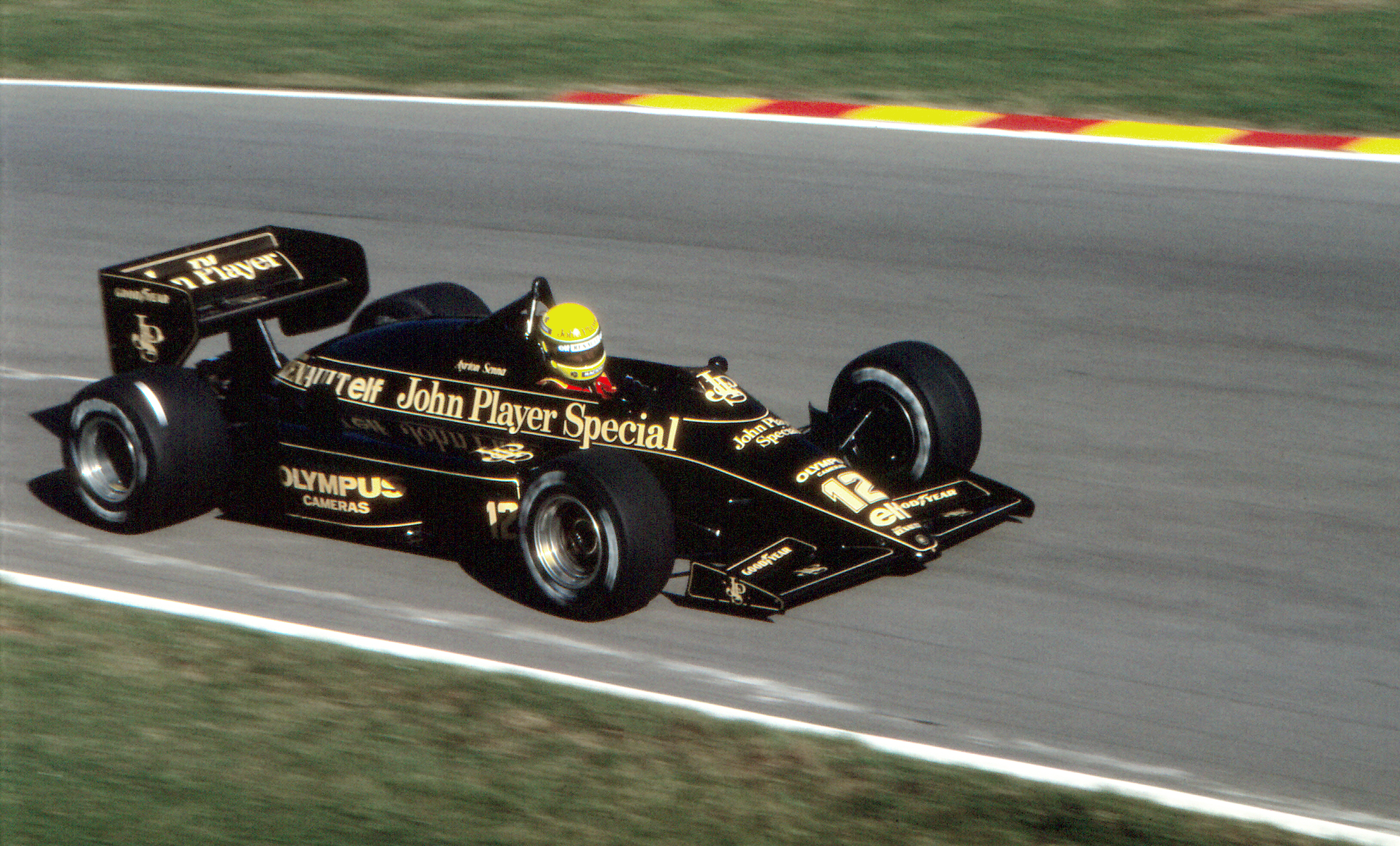
Senna driving the Lotus 97T at the 1985 European Grand Prix

Senna was partnered in his first year at Lotus-Renault by Italian driver Elio de Angelis. He had dominated testing times at Rio, although he retired with electrical issues during the race weekend. Although the Renault-powered Lotus 97T was quick and nimble, particularly on tight and bumpy circuits, it also proved to be heavily unreliable, denying Senna the chance to fight for the championship. At the second round of the season, the Portuguese Grand Prix, Senna took the first pole position of his Formula 1 career. He converted it into his first victory in the race, which was held in very wet conditions, winning by over a minute from the Ferrari of Michele Alboreto, and lapping everyone up to and including third placed Patrick Tambay. The race was the first Grand Slam of Senna's career, as he also set the fastest lap of the race. He later argued it was the best drive of his career, an opinion shared by race engineer Steve Hallam, who recognised Senna's "truly special" talent.

Senna led at the San Marino, Monaco, British and German Grands Prix but retired from all these races either from engine failures or running out of fuel, and he had a huge accident at the French Grand Prix at the Circuit Paul Ricard's fastest corner after breaking the engine in the middle of the corner. He did not finish in the points again until coming second at the Austrian Grand Prix, despite taking pole three more times in the intervening period. His determination to take pole at the Monaco Grand Prix had infuriated Alboreto and Niki Lauda; Senna had set a fast time early and was accused of deliberately baulking the other drivers by running more laps than necessary, a charge he rejected, although the accusations continued in Canada when drivers accused him of running on the racing line when on his slow down lap forcing others on qualifiers to move off line and lose time. Two more podiums followed in the Netherlands and Italy, before Senna added his second victory in wet-dry conditions, at the Circuit de Spa-Francorchamps in Belgium. Senna's relationship with de Angelis soured over the season, as both drivers demanded top driver status within Lotus and, after spending six years at the team, De Angelis departed for Brabham at the end of the year, convinced that Lotus were becoming focused on the Brazilian driver. Senna and de Angelis finished the season fourth and fifth respectively in the driver rankings, separated by five points. In terms of qualifying, Senna had begun to establish himself as the quickest in the field; his tally of seven poles that season was far more than that of any of the other drivers. Renault's V6 qualifying engines were reported to be producing over 1,000 bhp (746 kW; 1,014 PS).

==== 1986: Eight pole positions and eight podiums ====
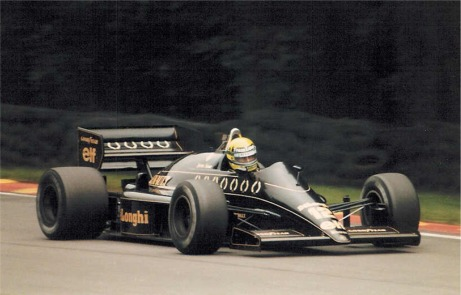
Senna driving the Lotus 98T at the 1986 British Grand Prix

De Angelis was replaced at Lotus by Scotland's Johnny Dumfries after Senna vetoed Derek Warwick from joining the team, saying that Lotus could not run competitive cars for two top drivers at the same time. Senna allegedly pushed for his former flatmate and fellow Brazilian Maurício Gugelmin to join the team as a pure number two driver, but the team's major sponsor John Player & Sons (JPS) insisted on a British driver, which led to the signing of Dumfries. Senna later admitted "It was bad, bad. Until then I had a good relationship with Derek." Senna started the season well, coming second in Brazil behind the Williams-Honda of fellow countryman Nelson Piquet, and winning the Spanish Grand Prix by just 0.014s from Piquet's teammate Nigel Mansell, in one of the closest finishes in Formula One history, to find himself leading the World Championship after two races. The 98T resembled the 97T that came before it, a quick car with superiority on tight, bumpy circuits but plagued with poor reliability, particularly in the second half of the season, as it saw him drift behind the Williams pairing of Mansell and Piquet, as well as the defending and eventual champion Alain Prost. Nonetheless, Senna was once more the top qualifier with eight poles, with a further six podium finishes, including another win at the Detroit Grand Prix, thus finishing the season fourth in the driver's standings again, with a total of 55 points. The 1986 Formula One cars were the most powerful cars in history, with Senna's 98T producing over 1,300 bhp (969 kW; 1,318 PS) in qualifying and 850 bhp (634 kW; 862 PS) in the race.

After winning the Detroit Grand Prix from Frenchmen Prost and Jacques Laffite — that took place one day after Brazil was eliminated from the 1986 FIFA World Cup by France — Senna asked a trackside supporter for the Brazilian flag and he drove one lap waving it. Thereafter, he repeated this ritual every time he won a race. Senna also had a brief foray into rallying when he was invited by British magazine Cars & Car Conversions to try out a Vauxhall Nova, an MG Metro 6R4, a Ford Sierra RS Cosworth and a Ford Escort on a stretch of land closed to the public.

==== 1987: Last season at Lotus ====
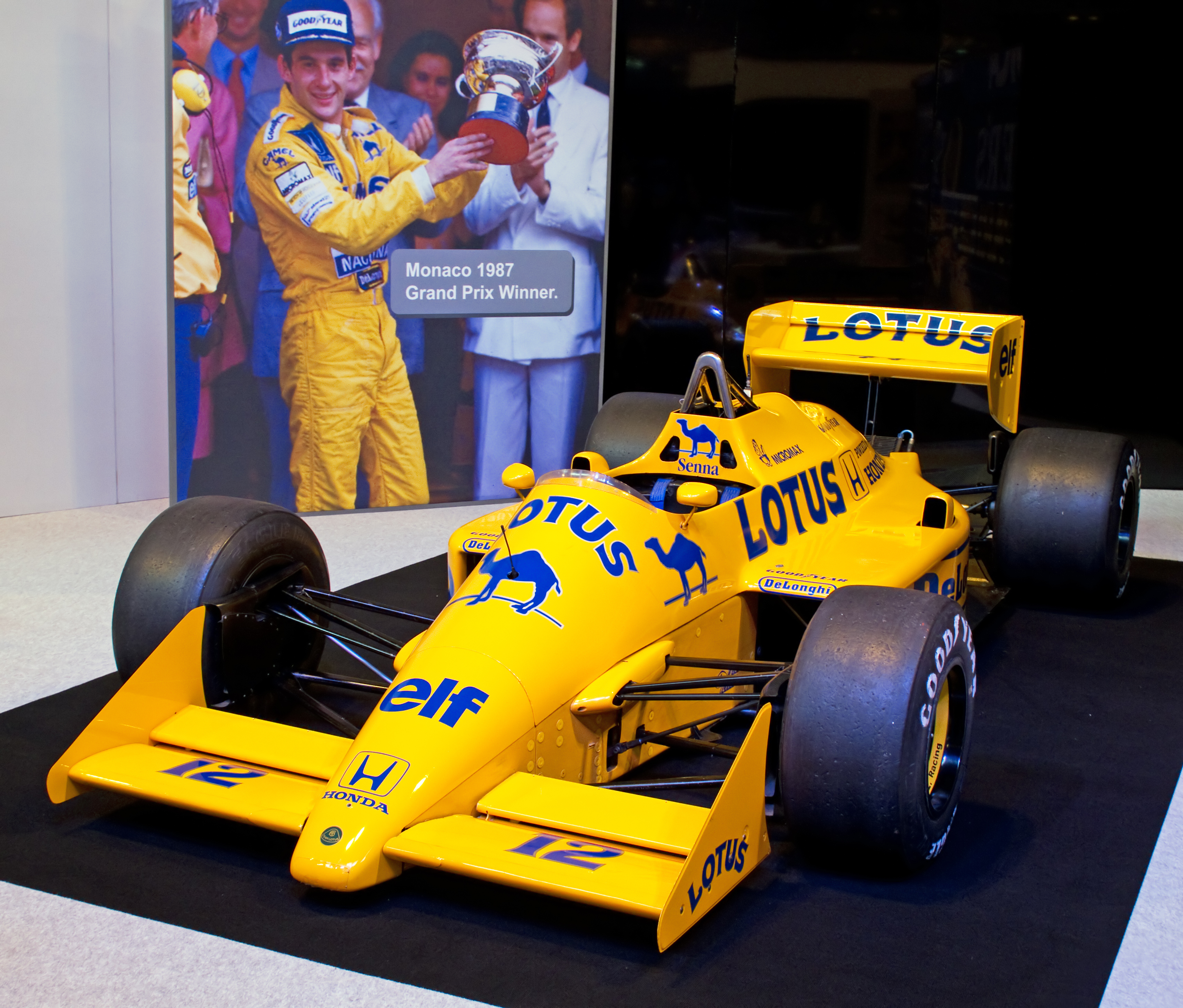
The Lotus 99T raced by Senna in 1987

Team Lotus had a new engine deal in 1987, running the same turbocharged Honda V6 engines as Williams had used to win the previous year's Constructors' Championship, and with them came a new teammate, 34-year-old Japanese driver Satoru Nakajima, who was a test driver employed directly by Honda. The team guaranteed Senna contractually preferential treatment over Nakajima in the allocation of equipment. Senna started the season with mixed fortunes: a podium at the San Marino Grand Prix was tempered by controversy at the following race at Spa-Francorchamps, where he collided with Mansell; afterward in the pits an irate Mansell grabbed Senna by the throat and had to be restrained by Lotus mechanics. Senna then won two races in a row, which helped him take the lead in the World Championship: the ensuing Monaco Grand Prix (the first of his record six victories at the Principality) and the Detroit Grand Prix, his second victory in two years at the angular Michigan street circuit, and the first ever for an active suspension Formula One car.

As the championship progressed, it became evident that the Williams cars had the advantage over the rest of the field, the gap between the Honda-engined teams made most obvious at the British Grand Prix, where Mansell and Piquet, in the superior Williams cars, lapped the Lotuses of Senna and Nakajima who finished 3rd and 4th respectively. Senna became dissatisfied with his chances at Lotus and at Monza it was announced that he would be joining McLaren for 1988. Senna was fined $15,000 for punching a corner marshal after they refused to push his stalled car in Mexico; he then finished the season strongly, coming second in the final two races in Japan and Australia; however post-race scrutiny at the final race found the brake ducts of his Lotus to be wider than permitted by the rules and he was disqualified. Senna was classified third in the final standings, with 57 points, six podium finishes and only one pole position. This season marked a turning point in Senna's career as, throughout the year, he built a deep relationship with Honda, which paid big dividends, as McLaren had secured Williams's supply of Honda's V6 turbo engines for 1988.

=== McLaren (1988–1993) ===
==== 1988: First world championship ====
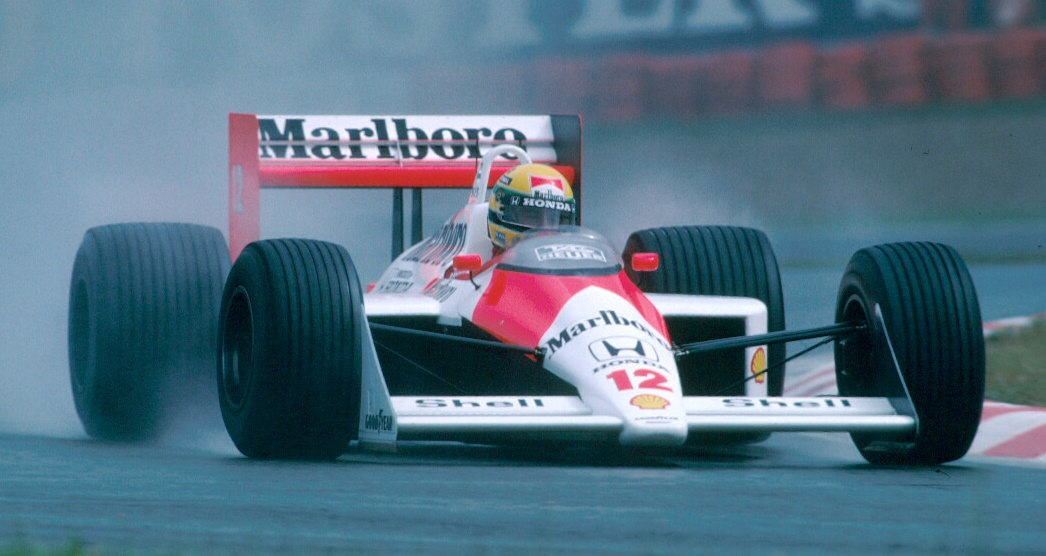
Senna won his first world title in 1988 driving that season's dominant McLaren MP4/4.

In 1988, due to the relationship he had built up with Honda throughout the 1987 season with Lotus, and with the approval of McLaren's number-one driver and then-double world champion, Alain Prost, Senna joined the McLaren team. The foundation for a fierce competition between Senna and Prost was laid, culminating in a number of dramatic race incidents between the two over the next five years. The experienced pair also quickly realized that despite their personal rivalry, they had to work together, especially in testing, to keep ahead of their main opposition from Ferrari, Williams, Benetton, and Lotus.

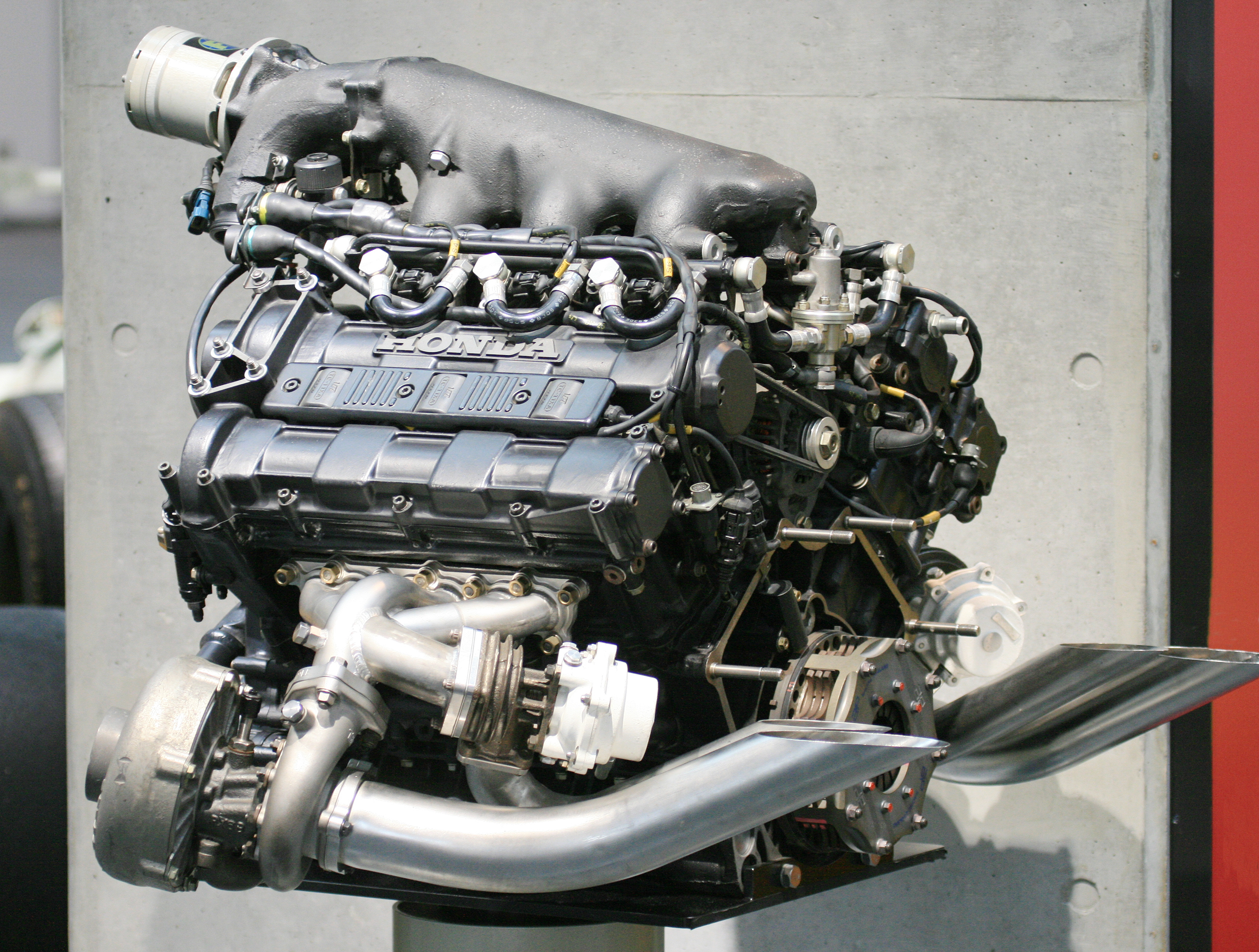
The Honda RA168E engine powered Senna to his first world championship.

One notable incident of the year was at the Monaco Grand Prix, where Senna out-qualified Prost by 1.4 seconds and led for most of the race before crashing on lap 67. Instead of returning to the pit lane, Senna was so distressed by his mistake that he went back to his apartment and did not contact the team until he walked into the pit garage as they were packing up later that night. After team manager Jo Ramirez called him through his Monaco apartment's cleaner, hours after he had crashed, Senna was still devastated by his own mistake. As the television cameras had not captured his crash, team boss Ron Dennis did not know what had caused his DNF until then, although Prost speculated that judging from the tyre marks, it appeared as though Senna had clipped the inside barrier at Portier, which pitched him into the outside guard rail.

At the Portuguese Grand Prix, Prost made a slightly faster start than Senna who, as he would a number of times, dived into the fast first corner ahead. Prost responded and went to pass Senna at the end of the first lap. Senna swerved to block Prost, forcing the Frenchman to nearly run into the pit wall at 290 km/h (180 mph). Prost kept his foot down and soon edged Senna into the first corner and started pulling away. Prost, normally a calm individual, was angered by Senna's manoeuvre, and the Brazilian got away with a warning from the FIA. At the post-race team debrief, Prost voiced his anger at the move, which prompted Senna to apologize to Prost for the incident.

Ultimately, the pair won 15 of 16 races in the dominant McLaren MP4/4 in 1988 with Senna coming out on top, winning his first Formula One world championship title by taking eight wins to Prost's seven. During the season, Senna rewrote the record books. His eight wins beat the old record of seven jointly held by Jim Clark (1963) and Prost (1984). His 13 pole positions also beat the record of nine held by Nelson Piquet (1984).

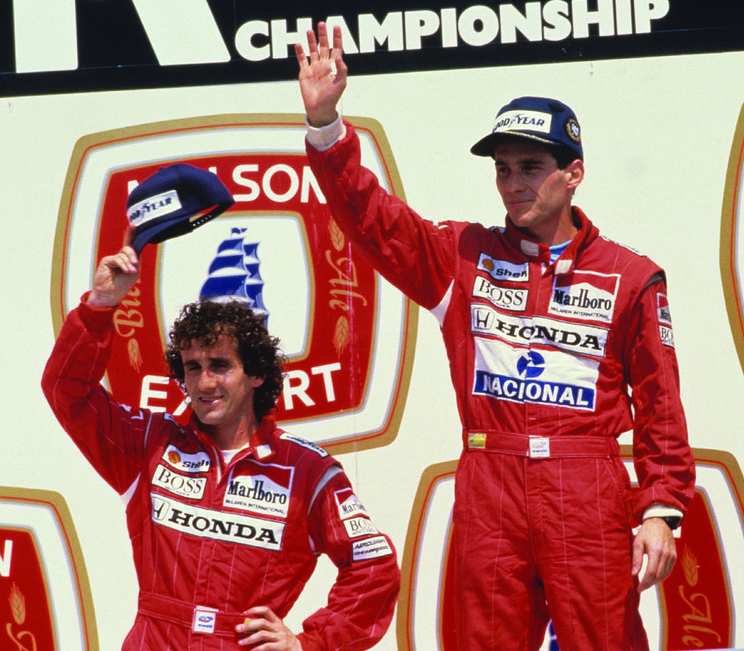
Alain Prost and Senna on the podium at the 1988 Canadian Grand Prix.

The biggest incident of the year happened at the Italian Grand Prix at Monza. With two laps remaining, Senna held a five-second lead over the Ferraris of Gerhard Berger and Michele Alboreto, who were closing in on the McLaren MP4/4 (Prost had earlier retired with a badly misfiring engine). Going into the Rettifilo chicane, Senna closed on the Williams FW12 of Jean-Louis Schlesser (standing in for the unwell Nigel Mansell). Schlesser steered wide, attempting to give Senna room to lap him, losing then regaining control to avoid going into the sand trap, and the two collided; Senna's car was beached on top of a curb and had stalled. Ferrari went on to finish 1–2, the first in an Italian Grand Prix since the death of the team's founder Enzo Ferrari. This proved to be the only race McLaren did not win in 1988.

==== 1989: Runner-up to Alain Prost ====
In 1989, the rivalry between Senna and Prost intensified into numerous battles on the track and a psychological war off it. Some controversy also arose after the French GP press conference when Ron Dennis declared that they found consistent differences between the Honda engines from Prost and Senna, to the detriment of Prost. Tension and mistrust between the two drivers increased when Senna overtook Prost at the restart of the San Marino Grand Prix, a move that Prost claimed violated a pre-race agreement (Senna denied the existence of any agreement, although Prost's story was backed up by John Hogan of the team's major sponsor, Marlboro). A discussion between the two drivers and Dennis during a test session at the Pembrey circuit in Wales served to effectively confirm Senna and Prost's personal animosity to Dennis and the team.

Senna took an early lead in the championship with victories in San Marino, Monaco, and Mexico. Senna led every lap of those races, a feat unequalled until Sebastian Vettel replicated it in 2012. Senna also managed to win in Germany, Belgium, and Spain, but the mechanical failures occurred in Phoenix, Canada, France, Britain, and Italy, together with collisions in Brazil and Portugal, swung the title in Prost's favour.

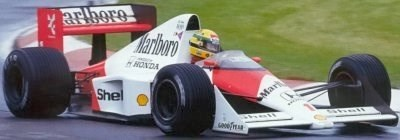
Senna driving the McLaren MP4/5 in 1989

Prost took the 1989 world title after a collision with Senna at the Suzuka Circuit in Japan, the penultimate race of the season, which Senna needed to win to remain in contention for the title. Prost had managed to leave the grid faster than Senna by removing the gurney flap from his car, which was unbeknownst to Senna. This reduction in aerodynamic downforce made Prost's car faster on the straights, but slower through corners—a clever choice to make it even harder for Senna to pass on a circuit already difficult on which to pass. On lap 46, Senna had finally come next to Prost and attempted a pass on the inside at the tight last chicane. Prost turned right into the upcoming corner, cutting Senna off and tangling wheels with him. The collision caused both McLarens to slide to a standstill into the escape road ahead. Prost abandoned the race at that point, whereas Senna urged marshals for a push-start, which he received, then proceeding with the race after a pit stop to replace the damaged nose on his car. He took the lead from the Benetton of Alessandro Nannini and went on to claim victory, only to be disqualified following a stewards meeting after the race. Senna was disqualified for cutting the chicane after the collision with Prost, and for crossing into the pit lane entry which was not part of the track.

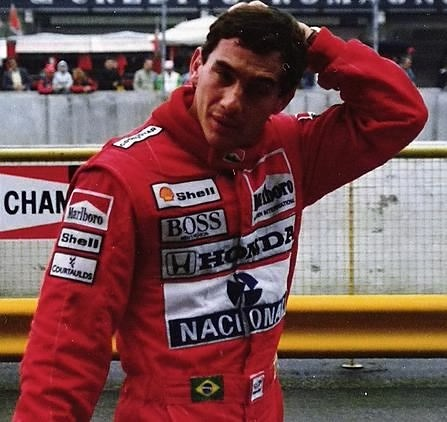
Senna at the 1989 San Marino Grand Prix

A large fine and temporary suspension of his FIA Super License followed in the winter of 1989, and an irate Senna engaged in public criticism of the FIA and its then-president, Jean-Marie Balestre, whom he blamed for his disqualification in Japan. Senna claimed that Balestre had forced the race stewards to disqualify him so his fellow Frenchman Prost could win the championship, though the stewards of the meeting denied that Balestre forced their decision, claiming that he was not present when the decision was made. Senna finished the season second with six wins and one second place.

==== 1990: Second world championship ====
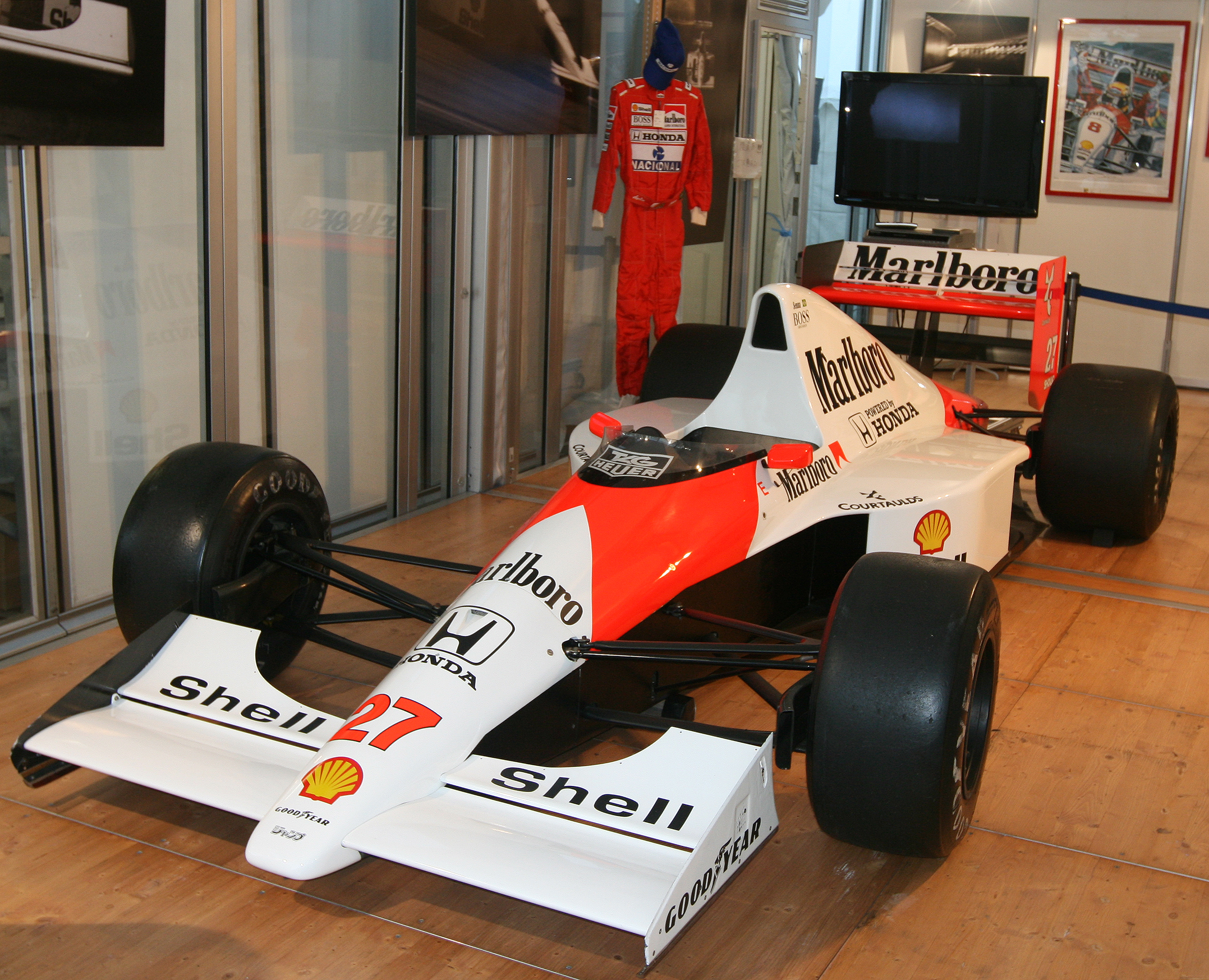
The McLaren MP4/5B raced by Senna in 1990. With it, he won his second world championship.

In 1990, Prost left McLaren for Ferrari, burning bridges on his way out. He was replaced by the Austrian Gerhard Berger, who became Senna's close friend.

Senna took a commanding lead in the championship with six wins, two second-places, and three thirds. Among his victories were the opening round on the wide streets of Phoenix, in which he diced for the lead for several laps with Jean Alesi's Tyrrell before coming out on top, and in Germany, where he fought Benetton driver Alessandro Nannini throughout the race for the win. However, Prost mounted a fierce challenge and scored five wins that season, including a crucial victory in Spain where he and teammate Nigel Mansell finished 1–2 for the Scuderia. Senna had gone out with a damaged radiator, and the gap between Senna and Prost was now reduced to nine points with two races left.

At the penultimate round of the championship in Japan, where Senna and Prost collided the previous year, Senna took pole ahead of Prost. Before qualifying, Senna had sought assurances from the organisers to move pole position left onto the clean side of the racetrack, where the racing line was. He later claimed that this agreement was not honored, possibly due to Balestre's interference. In addition, as revealed by journalist Maurice Hamilton, the FIA had warned that crossing the yellow line of the pit exit on the right to better position oneself at the first corner would not have been appropriate, further infuriating Senna.

At the beginning of the race, Prost pulled ahead of Senna, who immediately tried to repass Prost at the first corner. While Prost turned in, Senna kept his foot on the accelerator and the cars collided at 270 km/h (170 mph) and went off the track. Prost was out of the race, automatically making Senna world champion. Prost believed that Senna's actions were intentional, as (based on Honda telemetry) Senna continued speeding up as the two went into the corner. He added that he considered retiring from the sport after the incident. However, Senna initially denied that he intentionally wrecked Prost. When pundit and former champion Jackie Stewart confronted him about his actions and brought up his history of on-track accidents and collisions, Senna feigned outrage, replying that "if you no longer go for a gap that exists, you are no longer a racing driver."

One year later, Senna admitted that he intentionally wrecked Prost as payback for 1989, as well as his anger over the FIA's decision to disqualify him in 1989 and its pole position ruling in 1990. He said it was not how he wanted it to be, but it was how it had to be. He later apologized to Stewart for his remarks in 1989, telling him that "God won't allow me to live this lie."

==== 1991: Youngest back-to-back and three-time world champion ====
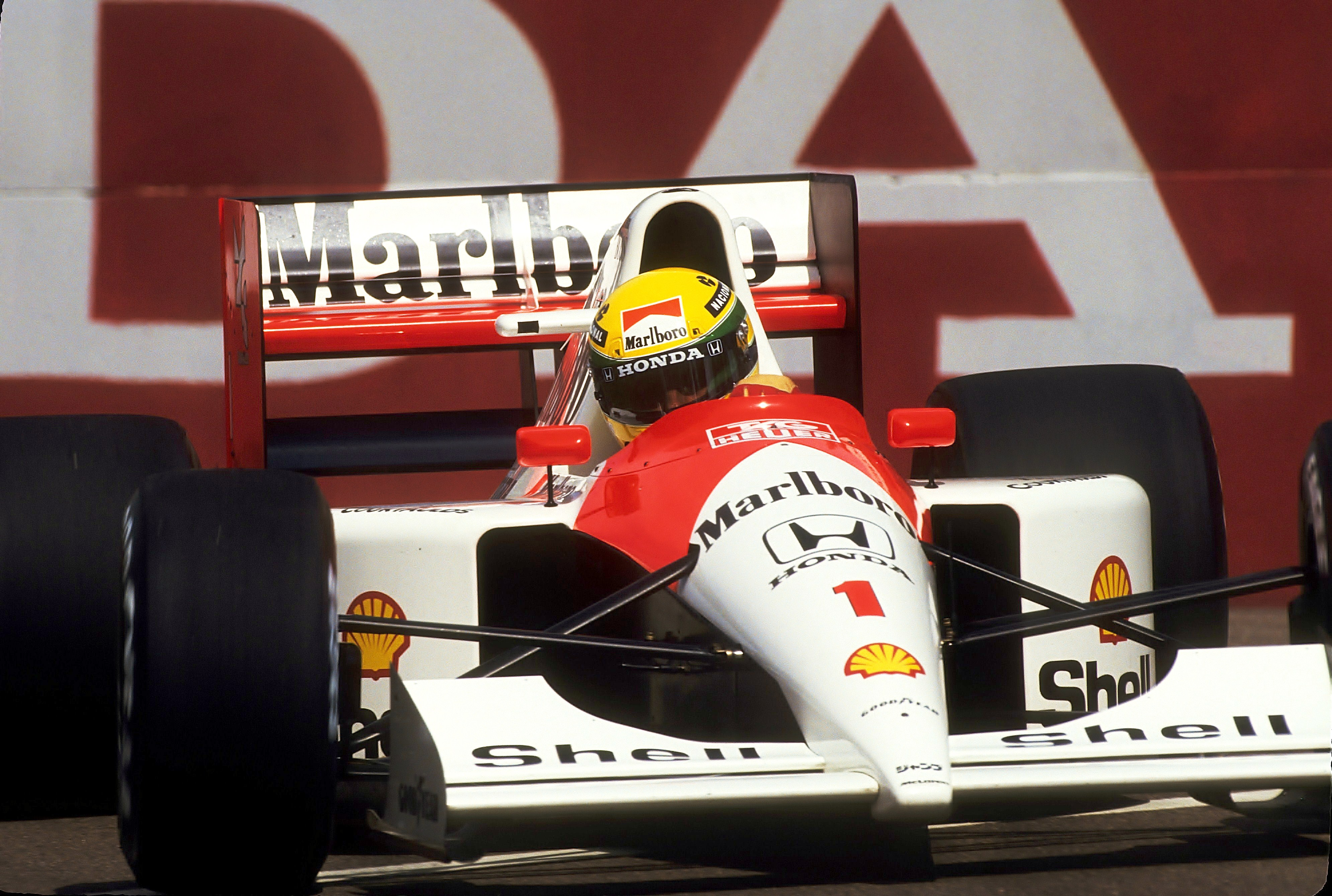
Senna won the 1991 season-opening United States Grand Prix with the new Honda V12-powered McLaren MP4/6.

In 1991, Senna became the youngest ever three-time world champion, taking seven wins and increasing his pole position record to 60 from 127 events. 1991 was a difficult season for Senna, who publicly questioned the new Honda V12 engine's competitiveness, suggesting that it was weaker than the last year's V10. Prost's Ferrari suffered a downturn in performance and was not competitive, but Nigel Mansell, now with Williams, was driving the Adrian Newey designed Williams-Renault.

Senna won the first four races in Phoenix, Brazil, Imola, and Monaco as his rivals struggled to match his pace and reliability. Mansell scored only six points by the time Senna had 40 points. At the Spanish Grand Prix, Senna and Mansell went wheel-to-wheel with only centimetres to spare, at over 320 km/h (200 mph) down the main straight, a race which the Briton eventually won.

Senna also got into several accidents and mishaps, including a jet-skiing accident before the Mexican Grand Prix; a crash in qualifying at that race at the fastest corner on the track; a retirement on the final lap of the British Grand Prix (Mansell eventually gave Senna a ride back to the pits during his victory lap); a testing accident at Hockenheim that sent Senna's car 15 feet into the air and forced him to spend the night in the hospital; and a retirement at the German Grand Prix after running out of fuel.

To save the season, Senna demanded additional engine upgrades from Honda. These modifications, including modifications introduced at Hungary and variable inlet trumpets introduced at Belgium enabled him to make a late-season push. He won three more races to pull away from Mansell. Once again, Senna clinched the title in Japan when Mansell (who needed to win) went off at the first corner while running third and beached his Williams in the gravel trap. Senna finished second, handing the victory to teammate Berger at the last corner as a thank-you gesture for his support over the season.

At the end of the season, Senna won his third consecutive Autosport International Racing Driver Award. At that year's FISA gala dinner, he gave Balestre a helmet because of the sincere atmosphere and as an insulting psychological gesture.

==== 1992: Unsuccessful challenge to the Williams FW14B ====
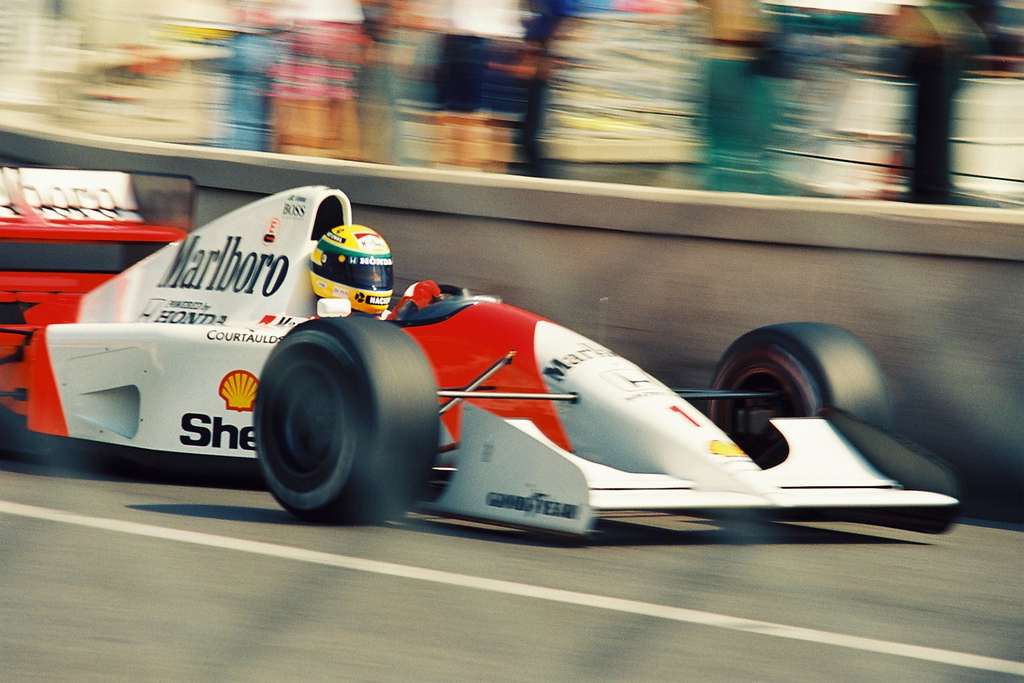
Senna won the 1992 Monaco Grand Prix in his McLaren MP4/7A.

Senna considered moving to Williams for the 1992 season, but Honda's CEO, Nobuhiko Kawamoto, personally requested that he remain at McLaren-Honda, which Senna did out of a sense of loyalty. In addition to Alain Prost's recommendation, Honda had played an important part in bringing Senna with them to McLaren.

In 1992, Williams's all-conquering FW14B car dominated the season. It boasted aerodynamic-enhancing active suspension and a powerful Renault V10 engine, which was now more powerful than Honda's. By contrast, the McLaren MP4/7A was beset by production delays and did not debut until round three. The team struggled to catch up to Williams' technological advantage, building a semi-automatic gearbox for the first time and trialing an active suspension system. The new car suffered from reliability issues and was unpredictable in fast corners. Honda left Formula One at the end of the season.

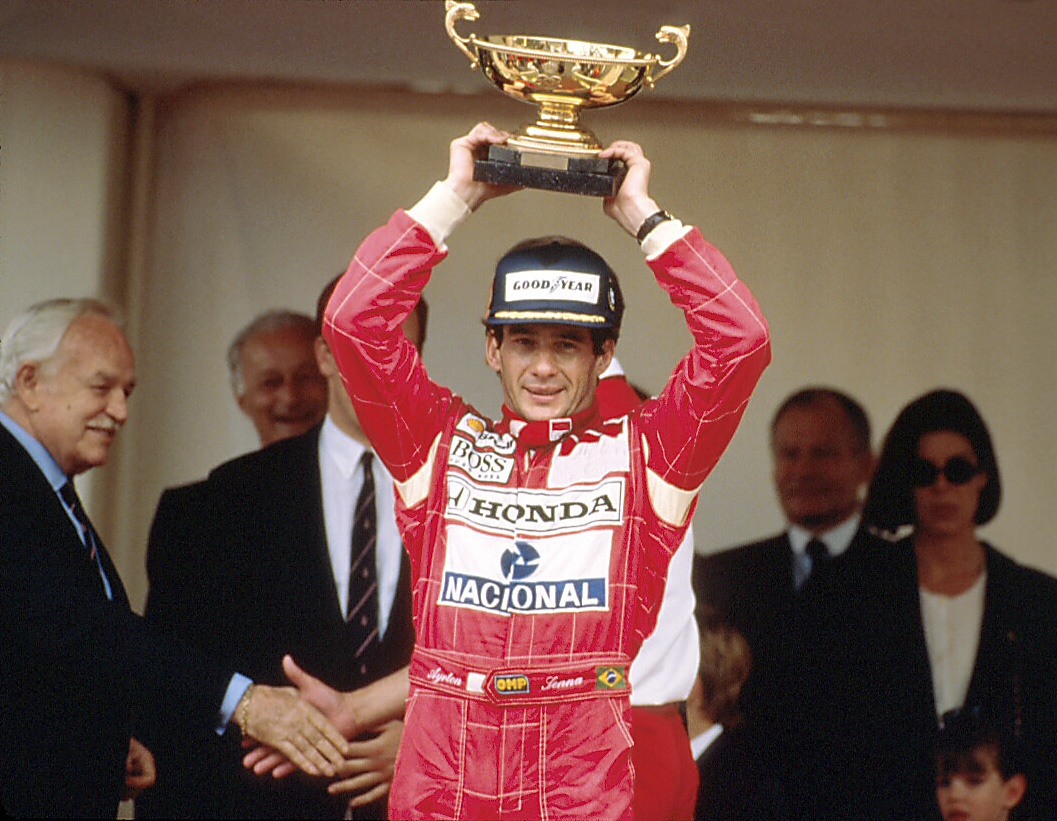
Senna at the 1992 Monaco Grand Prix

Senna won three races (Monaco, Hungary, and Italy) and finished fourth overall in the championship, behind the Williams duo of Mansell and Riccardo Patrese, and Benetton's Michael Schumacher. During this time, relations between Senna and Schumacher grew testy. At the Brazilian Grand Prix, Schumacher accused Senna of "playing around" while attempting to overtake Senna, who had a problem with his engine, a fact that Schumacher was apparently unaware of at the time. At the French Grand Prix, Schumacher collided with Senna, resulting in Senna's retirement. Senna later confronted Schumacher, who admitted responsibility for the accident. At a test session for the German Grand Prix, Senna and Schumacher had a confrontation in the pits, with Senna grabbing Schumacher by the collar and accusing him of endangering him by blocking him on the track.

Senna grew increasingly worried about driver safety during the season. At round two in Mexico, he suffered a major crash during practice and temporarily wore a neck brace before the next day's race. Various drivers, including Senna, criticized the poor condition of the circuit. During qualifying for the Belgian Grand Prix, French driver Érik Comas crashed heavily and Senna was the first to arrive at the scene. Senna could hear that the stricken car's engine was revving at max RPM, and with a possible fuel leakage that could cause an explosion at any moment. Disregarding his own safety, he exited his car and ran across the track to help the Frenchman. His actions were applauded and seemed to soften his hard-nosed image.

==== 1993: Final wins and last season at McLaren ====
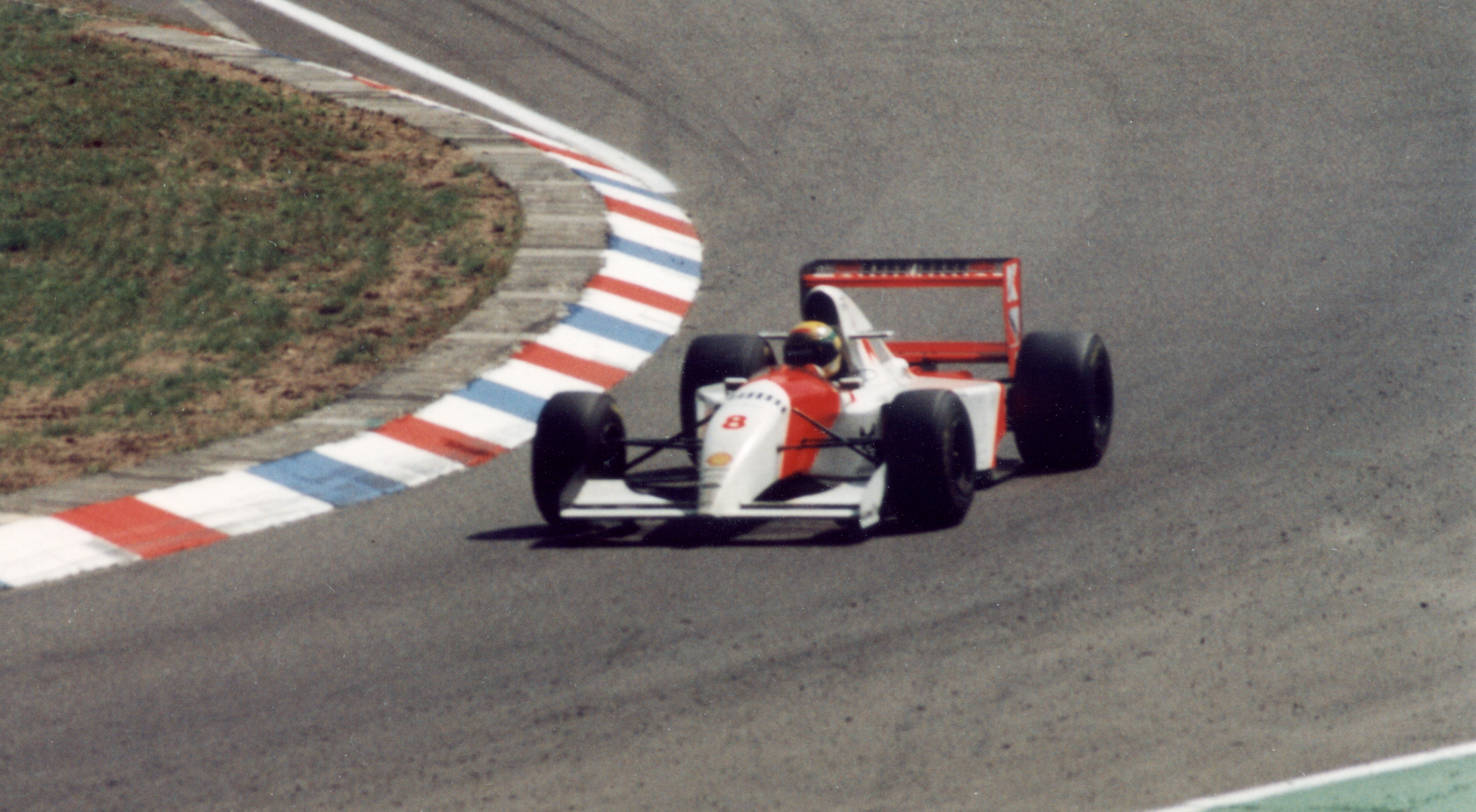
Senna piloted the McLaren MP4/8 from the back of the field to fourth at the 1993 German Grand Prix.

A free agent for 1993, Senna offered to drive for Williams for free. However, Alain Prost, who still had ill will against his former teammate, had already joined the team conditional on not being paired with Senna. Senna publicly accused Prost of cowardice, although the racing press noted that in 1986, Senna had done the same thing to Derek Warwick. Senna declined a drive from Ferrari, which eventually went to teammate Gerhard Berger. He reluctantly re-signed with McLaren on a race-by-race basis, and reportedly received a salary of $1 million per race.

Without Honda, McLaren was left with a customer supply of Ford engines, which were two specifications behind Benetton's Ford works engines and 50-80 horsepower behind Renault. However, Senna was heartened by the McLaren MP4/8, which implemented technological upgrades, including an updated active suspension system. Senna asked to switch to the Chrysler-backed Lamborghini V12 engine in midseason, but Dennis stuck with Ford for the rest of the season after Ford delivered an upgrade at round 11 in Hungary.

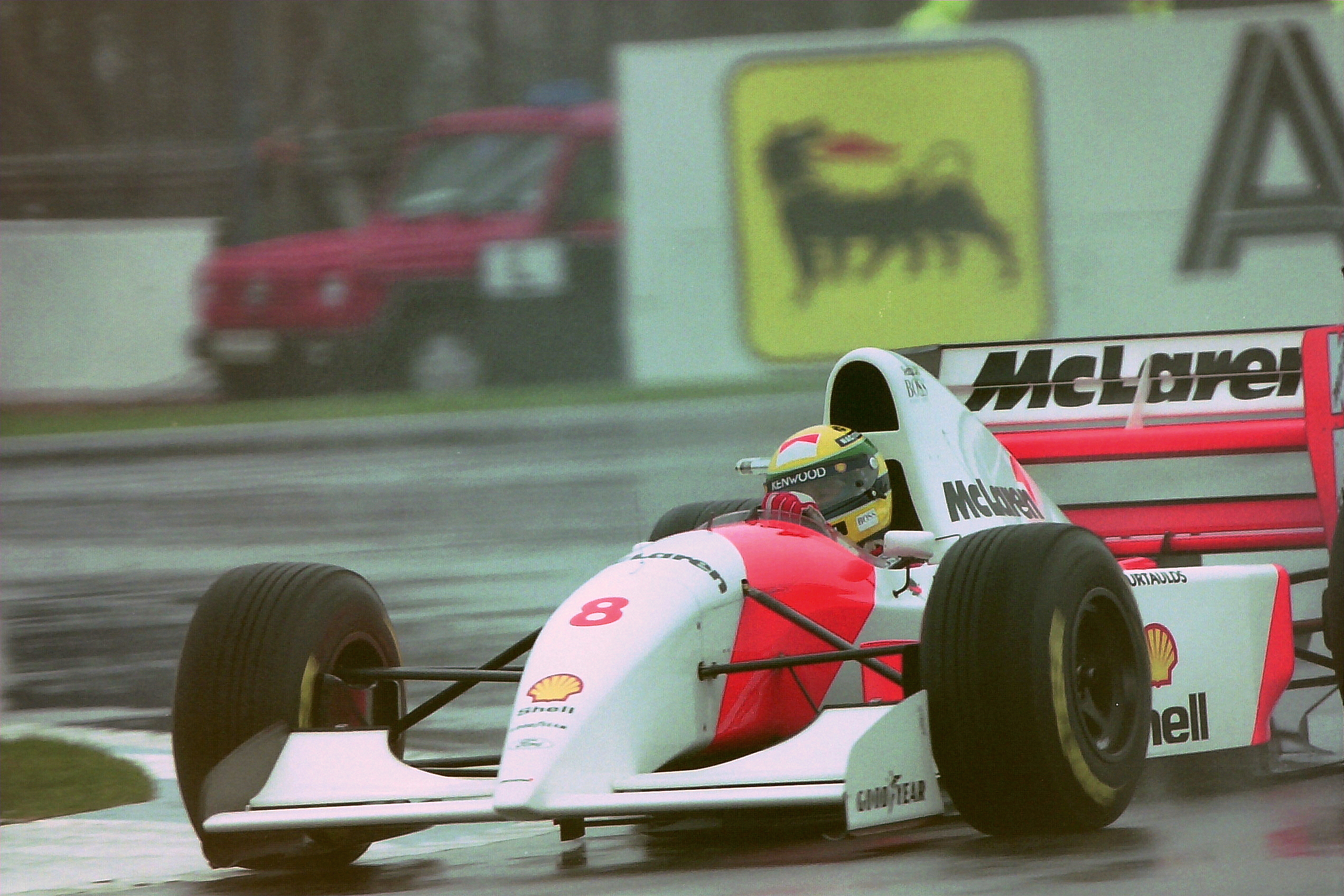
Senna's victory at the 1993 European Grand Prix is considered one of the best drives of his career.

Despite Williams' superiority, Senna won three of the first six races. He finished second at the season opener in Kyalami. He won his second Brazilian Grand Prix after Prost, who had been dominating the race, spun out in the rain; Senna's pass on Damon Hill for the lead was described as "the man at his most brilliant." The next race, the European Grand Prix at Donington Park, has been described as one of the greatest races in Senna's career. In fast-changing and rainy conditions—Prost's seven pit stops set a Formula One record—Senna overtook four drivers on the first lap and eventually lapped all but second place. He also won his record-breaking sixth win at round six in Monaco, breaking a tie with Graham Hill at five, after polesitter Prost was handed a ten-second stop-go penalty for jumping the start.

After Monaco, Senna unexpectedly found himself on top of the drivers' standings. However, he was only five points ahead of Prost. The Frenchman promptly pulled away with four straight victories. Senna's season was hampered by mechanical failures in Imola, Canada, Britain, Hungary, and Portugal. Prost took his fourth world championship, with Senna as runner-up.

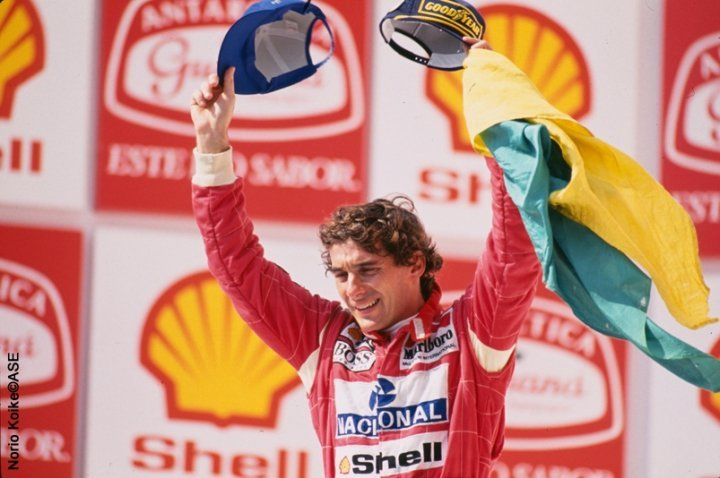
Senna won his second Brazilian Grand Prix in 1993.

Jean Todt recalled that Senna sought a seat at Ferrari for the 1994 season, during the Italian Grand Prix at Monza in September. Todt told Senna he would not break his contracts with Berger and Alesi. In mid-October, Senna signed with Williams to replace the retiring Prost for 1994. However, at the following race, the Japanese Grand Prix, Senna got into a heated argument with Jordan's Eddie Irvine (a backmarker who had tried to block Senna from lapping him) and eventually tried to punch Irvine in the head. He also turned down Prost's suggestion of a conciliatory gesture. After deliberations, the FIA limited Senna's punishment to a six-month suspended race ban (i.e., probation) for 1994, explaining that Irvine had provoked Senna on track and Senna had a "very positive attitude" with the tribunal. Senna's minimal punishment received some criticism, as the FIA had been threatening to ban Prost for four races for criticizing the FIA.

Senna took his 41st and last Formula One win at the Australian Grand Prix. It was McLaren's 104th win as a constructor, putting it ahead of Ferrari in the all-time constructor wins standings. Senna surprised the Formula One community by pulling Prost onto the top step of the podium to celebrate the Frenchman's retirement.

=== Williams (1994) ===
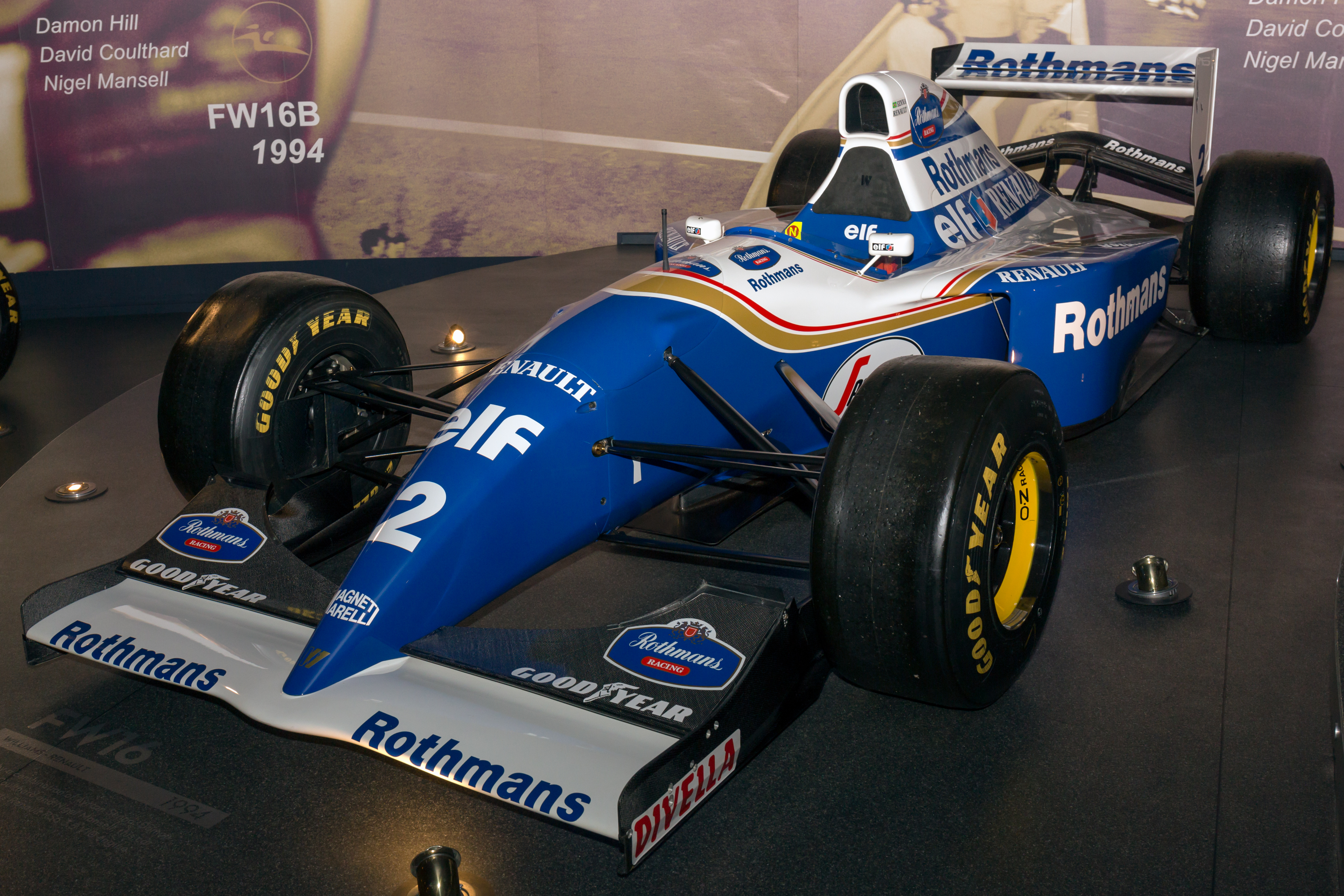
The Williams FW16 was the last Formula One car raced by Senna.

With Prost out of the picture, Senna joined Williams for 1994. He was reportedly paid a $20 million salary. Although Williams remained the premier team in Formula One for several more years, it was particularly affected by the FIA's 1994 ban on electronic driver aids like active suspension, anti-lock brakes, traction control, and launch control. Senna said that he had a "very negative feeling" about the FW16. He added that "it's going to be a season with lots of accidents, and I'll risk saying that we'll be lucky if something really serious doesn't happen." Before round three at Imola, Senna spoke with Ferrari's Luca Cordero di Montezemolo about potentially moving to the Scuderia.

Senna was particularly upset by rumors that Michael Schumacher's Benetton B194 was still secretly using the electronic driver aids. Following his retirement at the Pacific Grand Prix, Senna stood near the first corner to watch the cars, hoping to detect evidence of cheating. According to teammate Damon Hill, Senna claimed that he heard "unusual noises from the engine" indicative of cheating.

Senna took pole at the first three races but retired from each of them. At Brazil, Schumacher took the race lead after passing Senna in the pits. Senna pushed hard to overtake Schumacher, but spun on lap 56, forcing a retirement, However, even though he retired from the race in Brazil, he finished in 13th place because he was the last driver to retire and had completed more laps than the other drivers who had retired earlier. At the Pacific Grand Prix, Senna's race was ended by a multi-car accident at the first corner, where Mika Häkkinen hit him from behind and Nicola Larini subsequently T-boned him. Schumacher won both races, giving him a 20-point lead in the Drivers' Championship. Senna took pole again at Imola but fatally crashed during the race. Schumacher won his first Drivers' Championship and dedicated it to Senna.

== Death, state funeral and reaction ==
=== 1994 San Marino Grand Prix ===
The 1994 San Marino Grand Prix was held on the Autodromo Enzo e Dino Ferrari circuit located in Imola, Italy, between 28 April and 1 May 1994. The race was marked by a string of accidents suffered by Rubens Barrichello, Roland Ratzenberger, JJ Lehto, and Pedro Lamy, as well as Senna. Ratzenberger was killed by his crash in the qualifying session, and Senna brought an Austrian flag with him for the race, which he presumably intended to raise in honor of Ratzenberger. Senna was heavily disturbed by the crashes. On the morning of the race, Senna spoke with his retired ex-rival Alain Prost about re-establishing the Grand Prix Drivers' Association to organise for driver safety. Senna confided to Prost that "I'm not optimistic at all about this race."

On lap 7, Senna fatally crashed at the high-speed Tamburello corner. He was airlifted to Bologna's Maggiore Hospital, where he was pronounced dead at 18:40 CEST (16:40 GMT). The official time of death under Italian law was 14:17 CEST (12:17 GMT), the time of the crash. The hospital's head of emergency medicine, Dr. Maria Teresa Fiandri, stated that Senna sustained fatal skull fractures, brain injuries, and a ruptured temporal artery, any one of which would likely have killed him. Senna's friend and Autosprint's picture editor Angelo Orsi took photographs of Senna being treated on track, but out of respect, they have never been made officially public.

An analysis of the crash primarily focused on Senna's steering column, which broke during the crash or before it. The night before the race, Senna asked for the steering wheel to be adjusted. There was no time to build a new steering column from scratch, so Williams welded together different parts to extend the existing steering column. Following the race, six defendants—three senior Williams employees, the Formula One race director, the race organiser, and the Imola track director—were charged with manslaughter in Italian courts. The Williams defendants argued that the crash broke the steering column, while prosecutors argued that the column broke first and caused the crash. It was also charged that the Imola Circuit was in poor condition.

The defendants stood trial in 1997. Before the verdict, the prosecutor asked to drop the charges against everyone except Williams' Patrick Head and Adrian Newey, for whom he recommended suspended one-year sentences. Head and Newey were acquitted, and an appeals court upheld the acquittals in 1999. However, the Supreme Court of Cassation ordered a retrial to clarify facts about the steering column breakage and other potential causes of the accident. In 2005, a court found that the steering column was poorly modified and that its breakage on track caused Senna's accident. Newey was acquitted, as he was not responsible for the modifications. Head was found culpable, but was protected from prosecution by the statute of limitations. He appealed anyway to clear his name, but his appeal was rejected in 2007.

=== State funeral and burial ===
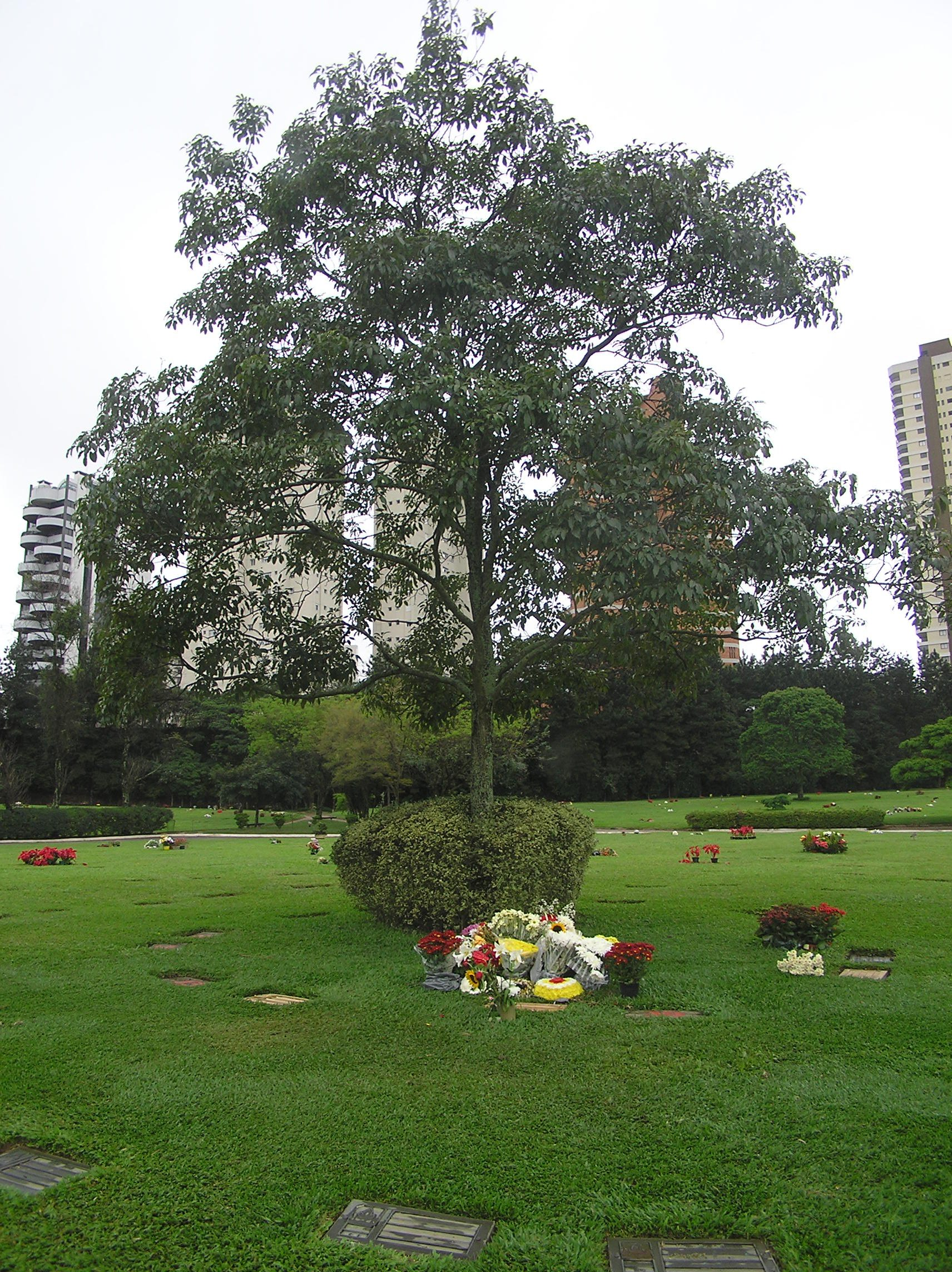

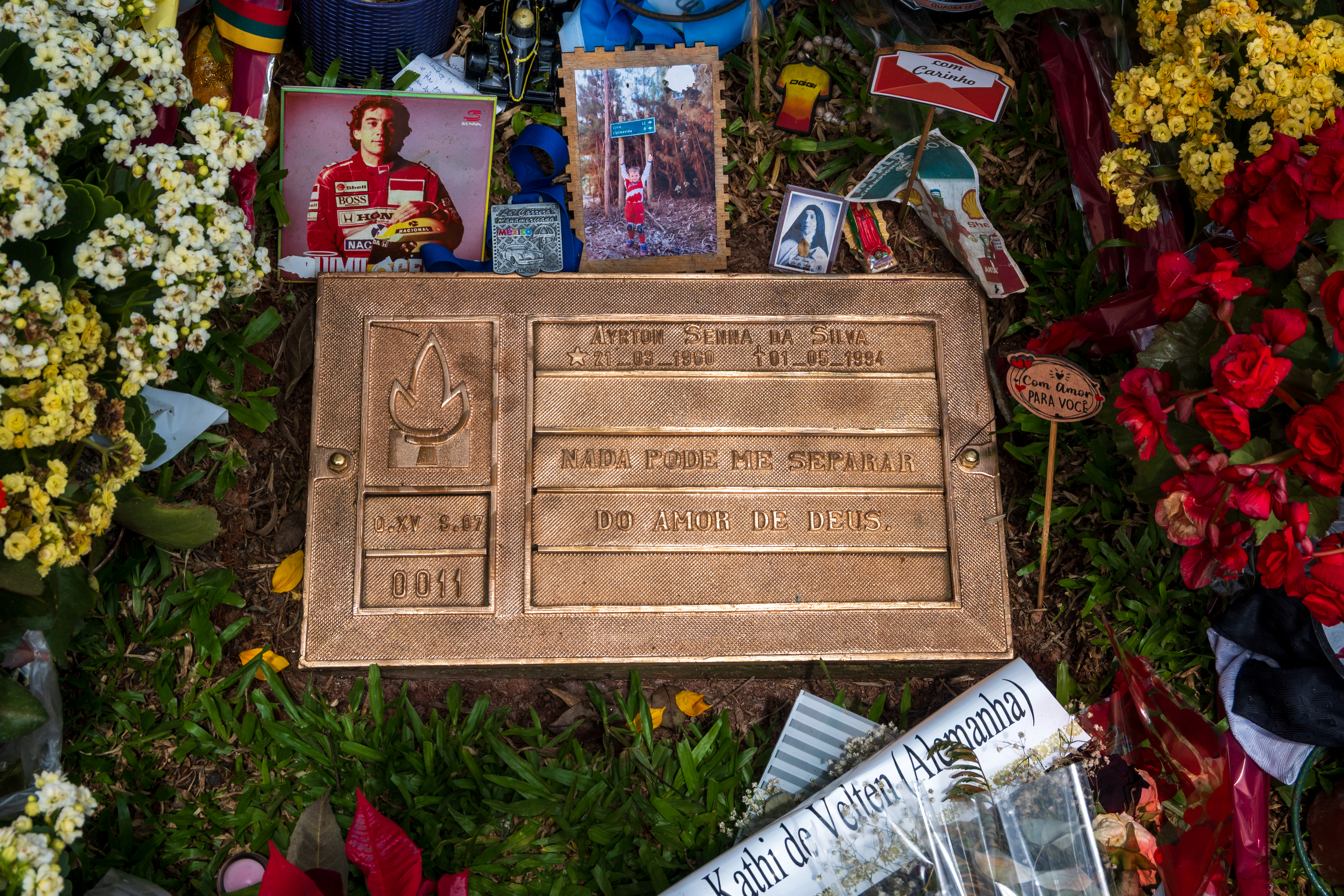
Senna's resting place at the Morumbi cemetery in São Paulo, with an inscription in Portuguese that reads "Nothing can separate me from the love of God"

Senna's body was flown back to Brazil on 4 May 1994. He lay in state at the Legislative Assembly building in São Paulo. His funeral took place the following day, 5 May. It was estimated that the whole ceremony and procession was attended by three million people, with over 200,000 visitors paying their respects and visiting the lay in state body inside the legislative assembly building. It was the largest funeral procession in the country's history. The Brazilian government declared three days of national mourning.

Senna was buried in the Morumbi Cemetery in São Paulo. His grave bears the epitaph "Nada pode me separar do amor de Deus" (Romans 8:38–39, "Nothing can separate me from the love of God").

=== Immediate reactions ===
For the next race at Monaco, the FIA decided to leave the first two grid positions empty and painted them with the colours of the Brazilian and the Austrian flags, to honour Senna and Ratzenberger. Throughout the rest of the 1994 season, Senna was commemorated in various ways. Damon Hill, along with Michael Schumacher, dedicated their individual success to Senna with Hill's victory in the Spanish Grand Prix and Schumacher's world-championship victory in the Australian Grand Prix.

A testament to the adulation he inspired among fans worldwide was the scene at the Tokyo headquarters of Honda where the McLaren cars were typically displayed after each race. Upon his death, so many floral tributes were received that they overwhelmed the large exhibit lobby. This was in spite of the fact Senna no longer drove for McLaren and that they did not use Honda engines anymore. Senna had a special relationship with company founder Soichiro Honda and was beloved in Japan, where he achieved a near-mythic status.

In July 1994, the Brazil national football team dedicated their World Cup victory to Senna, and collectively held a banner with their dedication on the field after defeating Italy in the final, which read "Senna... Aceleramos juntos, o tetra é nosso!" (lit. 'Senna... We speed together, the fourth title is ours!'). Senna had met various members of the squad, including Ronaldo, as well as Leonardo Araújo, three months earlier in Paris, telling them "this is our year".

== Other motorsport ventures ==
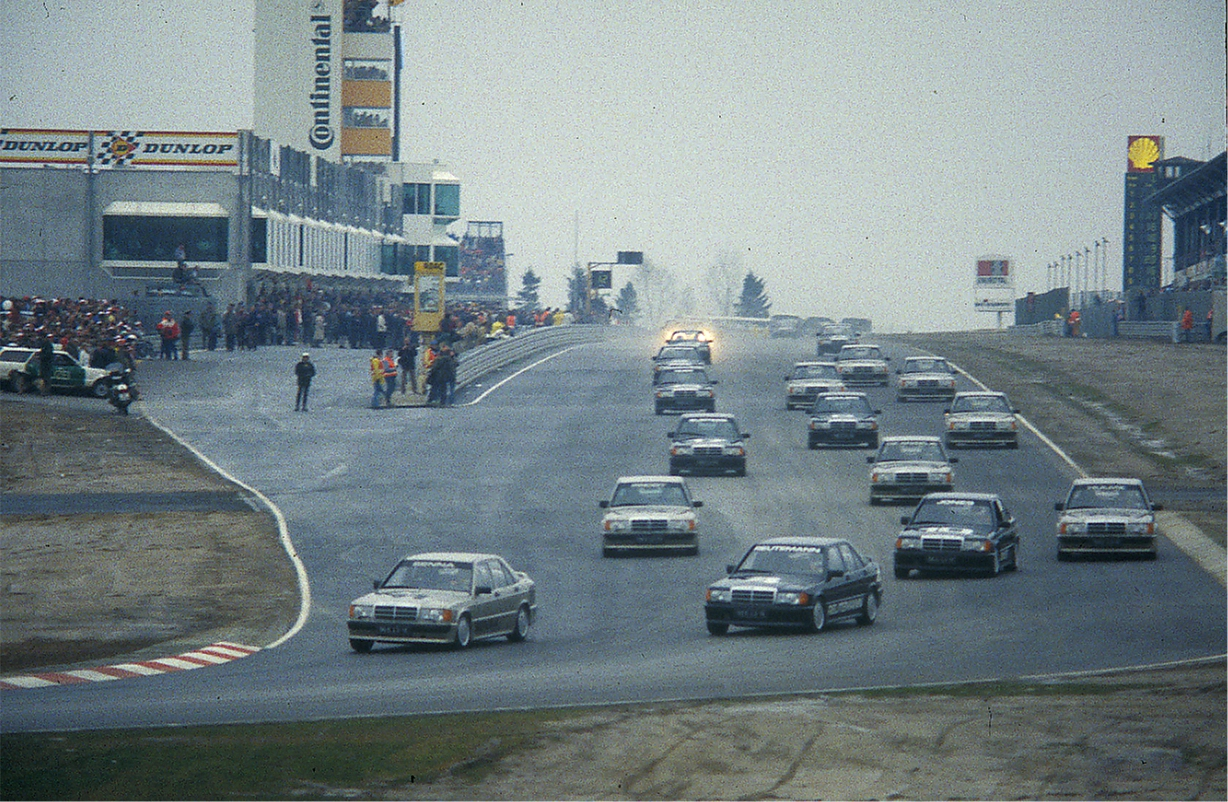
Senna (left) won the saloon exhibition race to celebrate the opening of the GP-Strecke layout of the Nürburgring in 1984.

Senna did not participate in many other forms of motorsport once he reached Formula One. He took part in the 1984 Nürburgring Race of Champions, an exhibition race where all drivers competed in identical examples of the then-new Mercedes 190E 2.3–16 with minor race modifications. The race was held on the then newly opened Nürburgring Grand Prix track, before the European Grand Prix. Notably, this race involved several past and present Formula One drivers, including Stirling Moss and past World Champions Jack Brabham, Denny Hulme, and Alan Jones, driving identical touring cars. Alain Prost started from pole position. Senna, who was a last-minute inclusion in the Mercedes race taking over from Emerson Fittipaldi, took the lead in the first corner of the first lap, winning the race ahead of Niki Lauda and Carlos Reutemann. After the race, Senna was quoted as saying: "Now I know I can do it."

Senna took part in the Nürburgring round of the 1984 World Sportscar Championship, driving a Porsche 956 for New-Man Joest Racing, alongside Henri Pescarolo and Stefan Johansson. He finished in 8th place but impressed the team and his co-drivers. He took part in the Masters of Paris-Bercy event in 1993, an indoor all-star kart racing competition held on a temporary circuit at the Palais Omnisports de Paris-Bercy. The event notably hosted the final on-track duel between Senna and Prost.

In December 1992, Senna partook in an IndyCar testing session with Team Penske, mediated by compatriot and Penske driver Emerson Fittipaldi at the Firebird International Raceway in Chandler, Arizona, where he tested a 1992 Penske PC-21 CART IndyCar. Unlike the more advanced Formula One cars, this IndyCar was powered by a turbo Chevrolet-Ilmor V8, had a traditional transmission with clutch pedal and iron brakes, and was markedly heavier due to its bigger physical size in comparison to a smaller Formula One car; IndyCar teams were run with significantly smaller budgets than Formula One teams and did not have to make their own cars. To familiarise himself, Senna initially ran 14 relatively slow laps before completing a further 10 laps on the same tyres and setting a best time of 49.09 seconds. By comparison, Fittipaldi had set a best time of 49.70 seconds, which he later improved to 48.5 seconds while testing the new 1993 Penske PC-22 later in the session.

In a 2018 interview, Fittipaldi revealed that Team Penske owner Roger Penske was ready to enter a third car for Senna to drive at the 1993 Indianapolis 500, which is one of the most prestigious races in the world and a race that reigning Formula 1 champion Nigel Mansell was competing at. These plans were curtailed by McLaren boss Ron Dennis who banned Senna from competing at Indianapolis as the Month of May preparations would clash with Senna's Formula 1 commitments.

== Personal life ==
=== Religion and charitable work ===
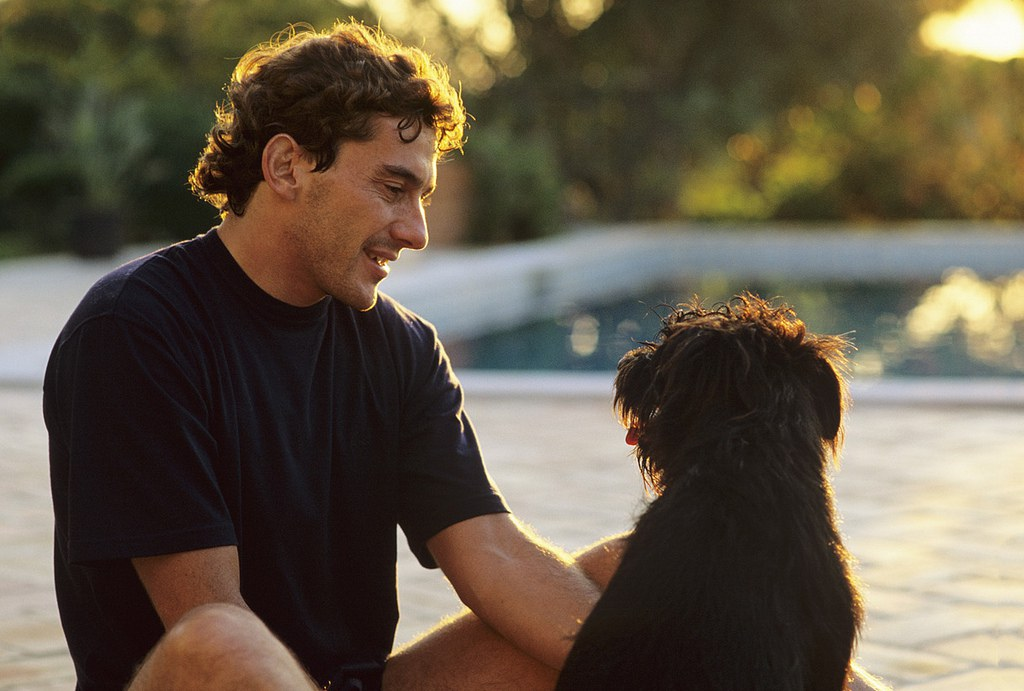
Senna at home in his native Brazil

Senna was a devout Catholic, once saying: "Just because I believe in God, just because I have faith in God, it doesn't mean that I'm immune. It doesn't mean that I'm immortal." He often read the Bible on long flights from São Paulo to Europe. According to his sister, Senna had sought strength from the Bible on the morning of his death: "On that final morning, he woke and opened his Bible and read a text that he would receive the greatest gift of all, which was God himself."

Senna secretly donated millions of U.S. dollars to help poor children. Shortly before his death, he created the framework for an organisation dedicated to Brazilian children, which later became the Instituto Ayrton Senna (IAS). The IAS has invested nearly US$80 million over a twelve-year period in social programs and actions in partnership with schools, government, NGOs, and the private sector, aimed at offering children and teenagers from low-income backgrounds the skills and opportunities they need to develop their full potential as persons, citizens, and future professionals. The foundation is officially advised by Bernie Ecclestone, Alain Prost, and Gerhard Berger.

In a 1994 interview following Senna's death, Frank Williams said that "If you want a summary of Ayrton Senna ... he was actually a greater man out of the car than in it."

=== Family and relationships ===
Senna married his childhood friend Lilian de Vasconcelos Souza in 1981, but she had difficulty adapting to her husband's racing life in England and they divorced in 1982. Vasconcelos later said: "I was his second passion. His first passion was racing." Although Senna did not have much of an income early in his racing career, he insisted on supporting his wife with no help from his father out of a sense of pride.

Senna's nephew Bruno also became a Formula One driver, competing from 2010 to 2012. Senna praised Bruno's talent, telling people in 1993 that "If you think I'm fast, just wait until you see my nephew Bruno." Bruno temporarily quit racing to please his family after Senna's death. In 2012, he raced for the Williams team, which was a decision that, reportedly, had a significant emotional impact on the Senna family.

From 1985 to 1988, Senna dated—and was briefly engaged to—Adriane Yamin, the daughter of a São Paulo entrepreneur.

In 1988, Nelson Piquet accused Senna of being homosexual in an incendiary interview, in which Piquet also called Enzo Ferrari "senile", former teammate Nigel Mansell an "uneducated blockhead", and Mansell's wife "ugly". Piquet retracted his comments after Senna and Mansell threatened to sue him for slander. Senna shot back in a 1990 interview with the Brazilian edition of Playboy, declaring that he lost his virginity at 13 years of age to a prostitute arranged by his cousin, and insinuating that Piquet loathed him because he had previously slept with Piquet's future wife.

Following Piquet's remarks, Senna was involved in a series of high-profile relationships, including with Brazilian singer and television star Xuxa from late 1988 until 1990. Senna also had an affair with American model Carol Alt, and briefly dated models Marjorie Andrade and Elle Macpherson. At the time of his death, Senna was in a relationship with Brazilian model—and, later, television personality—Adriane Galisteu. Six years after Senna's death, in 2000, model Edilaine de Barros filed a paternity suit against the Senna estate, but DNA testing later proved that Senna was not the father.

=== Wealth, properties and endorsements ===
At his death, Senna's estate was estimated at $400 million. Senna owned several properties, including an organic farm in Tatuí, Brazil (where he built a go-kart track in 1991), a beach house in Angra dos Reis, Brazil, an apartment in São Paulo, Brazil, an apartment in Monaco, an estate in Sintra, on the Portuguese Riviera, and a house in Algarve, Portugal. He owned a private jet (British Aerospace 125) and a helicopter, the latter of which he piloted to travel between his various Brazilian residences.

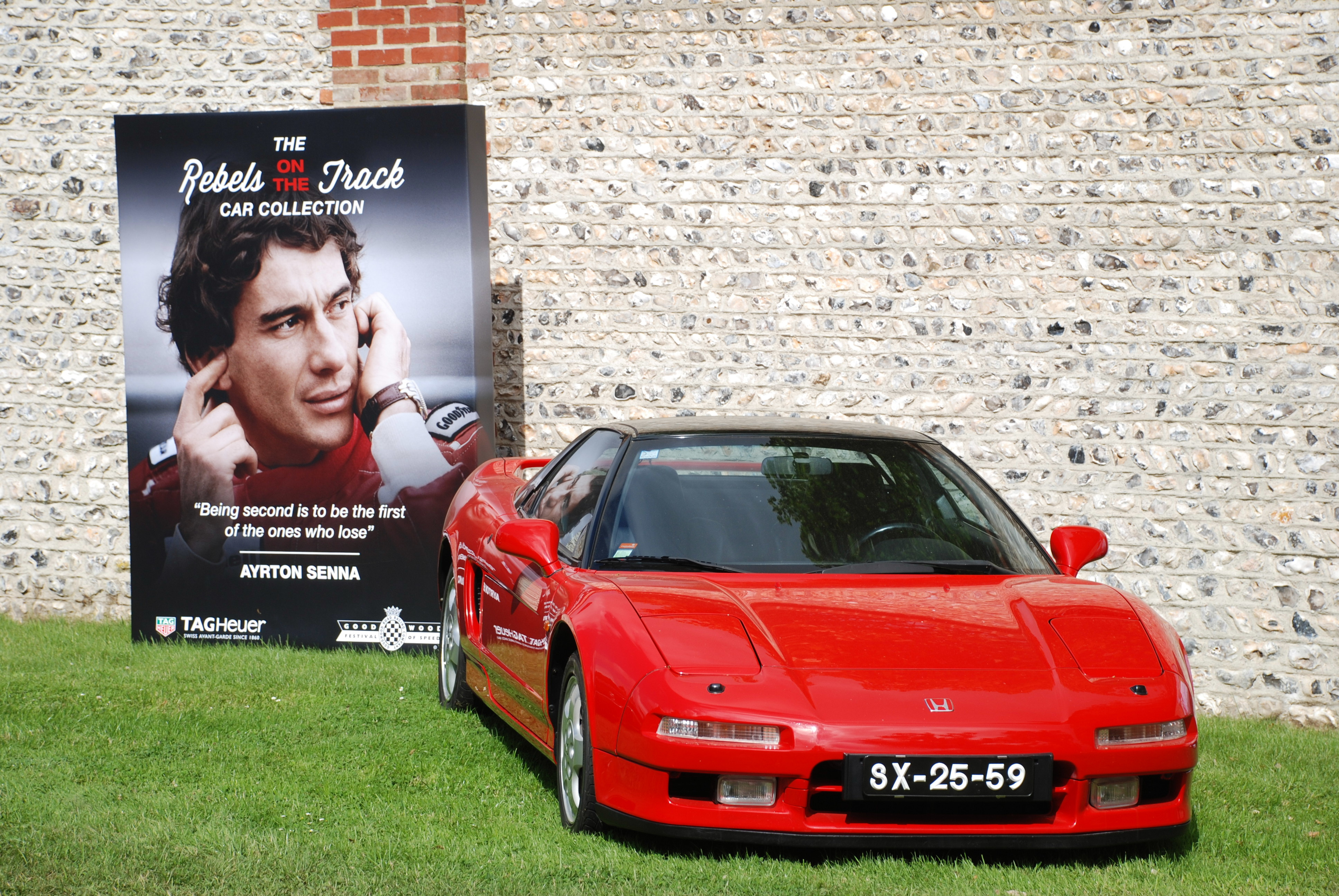
Senna's red NSX, loaned to him by Honda Portugal, on display at the 2016 Goodwood Festival of Speed

As part of his close relationship with Honda, Senna endorsed Honda sportscars, including the Honda Prelude and the Honda NSX. He helped test and fine-tune the NSX, working directly with chief NSX engineer Shigeru Uehara and his team during five testing sessions at Suzuka. Honda credited Senna's feedback, explaining that Senna encouraged Uehara to increase the stiffness of the chassis. In return, Honda gave Senna a custom-made black NSX. He also drove two other NSX cars owned by Honda Portugal and Senna's friend Antonio Carlos de Almeida Braga.

In 1993, Senna signed a lucrative agreement to import, market, and sell Audi cars in Brazil. Sales began in April 1994, just a month before his untimely death. In 1999, Audi Senna was created as a joint venture of Audi with Senna Import. Aside from the black NSX mentioned above, Senna's other personal car in 1994 was a silver Audi 100 S4 Avant. Senna also endorsed the Ducati 916 motorbike shortly before his death in 1994.

In the early 1990s, Senna developed his own merchandise brand represented by a logo with a double S, after his full surname, "Senna da Silva". This logo is meant to represent an S chicane on a racing circuit. The Senna brand was used for apparel, watches, bicycles (Carraro), motorcycles and boats. Hublot, TAG Heuer, Universal Genève, and REC Watches have created limited-edition watches to honour Senna, both during his lifetime and after his death.

Senna also endorsed several video games and multimedia offerings, including 1992's Ayrton Senna's Super Monaco GP II, which featured pre-recorded advice from Senna and included Senna's personal farm circuit in Tatuí as one of the possible tracks. Senna also contributed several interviews to the Japan-exclusive Ayrton Senna Personal Talk: Message for the Future, a multimedia compact disc for the Sega Saturn. Ayrton Senna Kart Duel, a series of kart racing games using his branding was released for the PlayStation 1 in 1996, followed by two sequels in 1997 and 1999. Senna continues to feature in video games following his death. In 2013, Gran Turismo 6 released a Senna-centered expansion pack, with some of the proceeds going to help the IAS. In 2019, F1 2019 released a DLC focusing on the Senna-Prost rivalry.

=== Hobbies ===
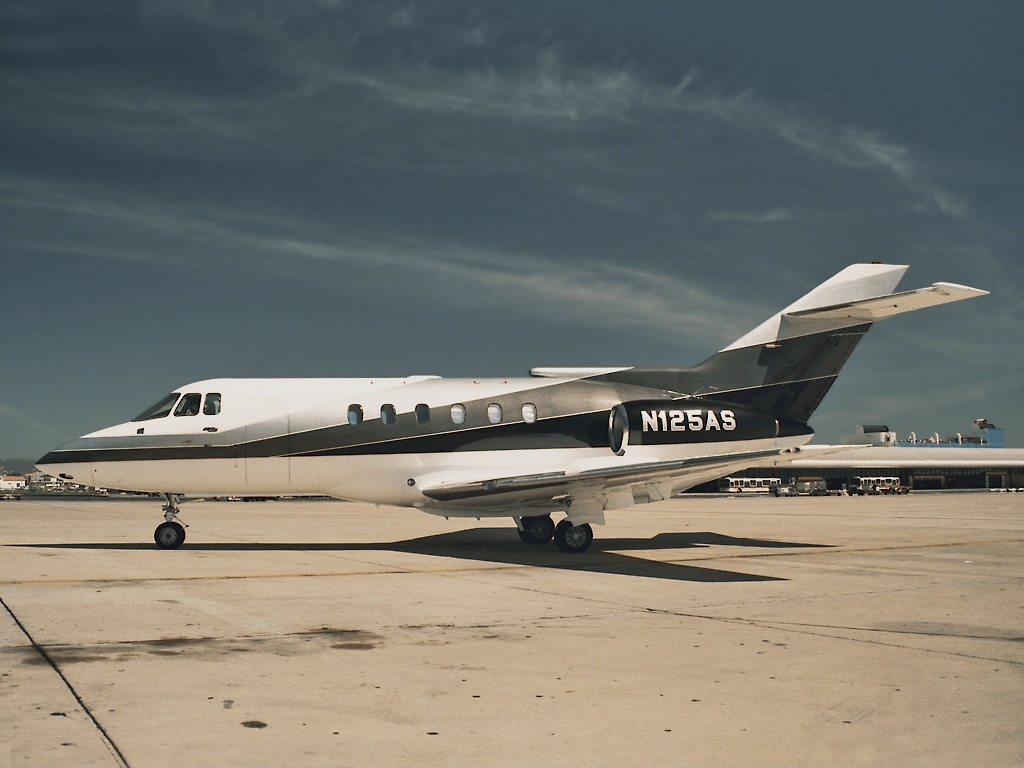

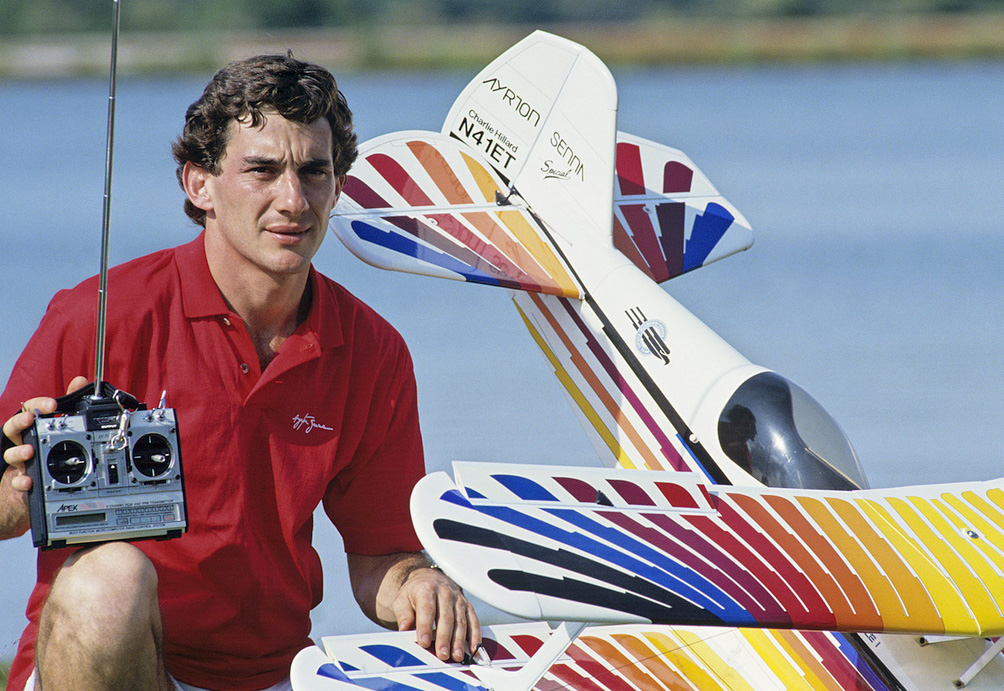
Senna's own BAe-125 private jet (top) in Faro, Portugal with registration N125AS, AS standing for his initials, and passing time with a model plane (bottom)

Senna enjoyed a range of physical activities including running, waterskiing, jet skiing, and paddleboarding. He also had several hobbies, such as flying real and model planes and helicopters, boating, fishing, and riding Ducati motorbikes.

For his 29th birthday in 1989, the Brazilian Air Force gave Senna a flight on one of their jet fighters (a Dassault Mirage III), which bears commemorative livery and is now exhibited at the Aerospace Museum of Rio de Janeiro. After a three-ship flyover of the type at the 1990 Australian Grand Prix, Senna was given a joyride in an RAAF F-111C.

== Racing legacy ==
=== Appraisals ===
Near the end of his career, Senna was almost universally recognized as the best driver in the sport. In 1990, he was named L'Équipe International Athlete of the Year. In 1993, a poll of Formula One drivers gave Senna a near-unanimous vote as the best driver in Formula One.

Following Senna's death, various polls and ranking services have rated him the best driver of all time.

- 2004: A poll on the F1 Racing magazine.
- 2009: A poll of 217 current and former Formula One drivers conducted by Autosport magazine.
- 2010: A poll of F1 drivers conducted by German newspaper Bild am Sonntag.
- 2012: A poll of BBC Sport journalists.
- 2018: Using the elo ranking system the data analysis site FiveThirtyEight produced a ranking of all the F1 drivers during the period of 1950–2020. In the end Senna had the highest average elo rating among the top 30 drivers, and was named the most dominant driver in a best five-year span.
- 2020: Formula One, sponsored by Amazon Web Services, used AWS machine learning algorithms to compare drivers' qualifying performances. The algorithm named Senna the fastest qualifier of all time.

Senna is also universally appraised by his wet driving performance, frequently being considered as one of the best drivers of all time in wet race conditions; as of 2023 he still retains the highest ratio of wins in wet races started. In April 2000, Senna was inducted into the International Motorsports Hall of Fame. That year, the British public also voted Senna's opening lap of the 1993 European Grand Prix, the 43rd in the list of the 100 Greatest Sporting Moments. Several F1 drivers from different generations have publicly cited Senna as their idol or as one of their main inspirations in motorsport, these drivers include names such as Fernando Alonso, Michael Schumacher, Lewis Hamilton, Sebastian Vettel, Pierre Gasly, Charles Leclerc, Kimi Antonelli, Gabriel Bortoleto, among others. (Note: Per several sources:)

=== Driver safety ===
Towards the end of his career, Senna became increasingly preoccupied with the dangers of his profession. On the morning of his death, he spoke with current and former rivals and friends, including Niki Lauda and Alain Prost, about reforming the Formula One drivers' union, the Grand Prix Drivers' Association. Senna wanted the GPDA to advocate for safety reforms.

Following the events of Imola 1994, Formula One enacted a variety of safety improvements in the subsequent years. Some immediate alterations included improved crash barriers, redesigned tracks, higher crash safety standards, and significant cuts to engine power. Other reforms included the use of computer analysis to identify a range of dangerous corners that needed to be made safer, test procedures for tyre barriers, a reduction of the speed limit in the pit lane to 80 km/h in practice and 120 km/h in races, and stricter standards for helmet design were introduced. On-track medical procedures were also revised. In 1995 the Tamburello corner and other parts of the Imola circuit were altered. The tragic events that unfolded at Imola in 1994 with the deaths of Roland Ratzenberger and Ayrton Senna can be understood as a turning point for Formula One driver safety, the changes in attitude and in the procedures and standards that resulted from this were profound, and its effects continues to endure to the present day.

=== Racing persona ===
Senna was often quoted as using driving as a means for self-discovery and racing as a metaphor for life, saying: "The harder I push, the more I find within myself. I am always looking for the next step, a different world to go into, areas where I have not been before. It's lonely driving a Grand Prix car, but very absorbing. I have experienced new sensations, and I want more. That is my excitement, my motivation."

Senna was proud of his driving ability, and responded angrily to criticism. In 2000, Autocourse noted that "Senna was the one driver who genuinely cared where he was ranked in [Autocourse's ranking of the year's] Top 10 drivers," and took being placed below his rivals as a personal slight. (Senna was ranked No. 1 in 1988, 1991, and 1993.) In 1990, Autocourse dropped Senna from No. 1 to No. 2 to criticize him for wrecking Alain Prost at Suzuka in 1990. Senna was so outraged that despite being given the No. 1 driver award in 1991, Senna refused to write the usually customary foreword by the year's World Champion; Honda's Head of Racing wrote the foreword instead. In 1993, Autocourse ranked Senna No. 1 even though Prost took the title that year, writing that Senna had "intense egocentricity and uniquely flawed genius" and "matchless genius in the wet".

Although Senna cultivated a public image of "an inward-looking, aloof driver who is hard to get along with," Senna was close friends with McLaren teammate Gerhard Berger. The two frequently played practical jokes on each other. Berger summed up their relationship by saying "He taught me a lot about our sport, I taught him to laugh." Senna's press officer selected Berger and Emerson Fittipaldi to lead the procession of Formula One greats at Senna's funeral.

== Cultural legacy ==
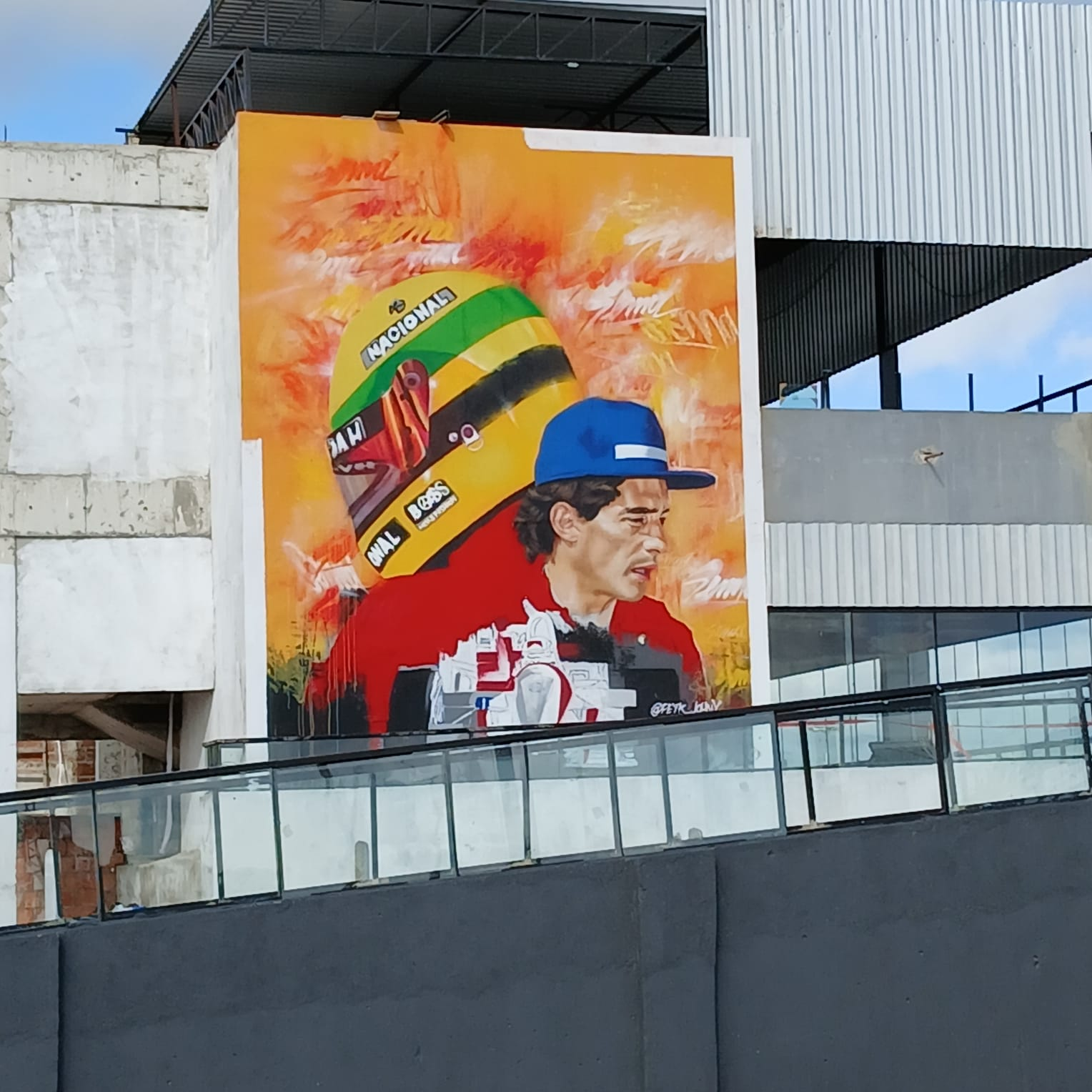
Painting of a mural of Ayrton Senna in the city of Pilar, Alagoas.

A Brazilian cultural icon, Senna remains a national hero in Brazil. During his time at McLaren driving with Honda engines Senna became a fan favourite in Japan, and achieved a near-mythic status in the country. He also developed a close relationship with Honda founder Soichiro Honda, and is credited for popularizing Formula 1 in Japan. In 2006 the Japanese public ranked Senna 22nd in Nippon TV's survey of Japan's top 100 favourite persons in history.

=== Formula One memorials to Senna ===
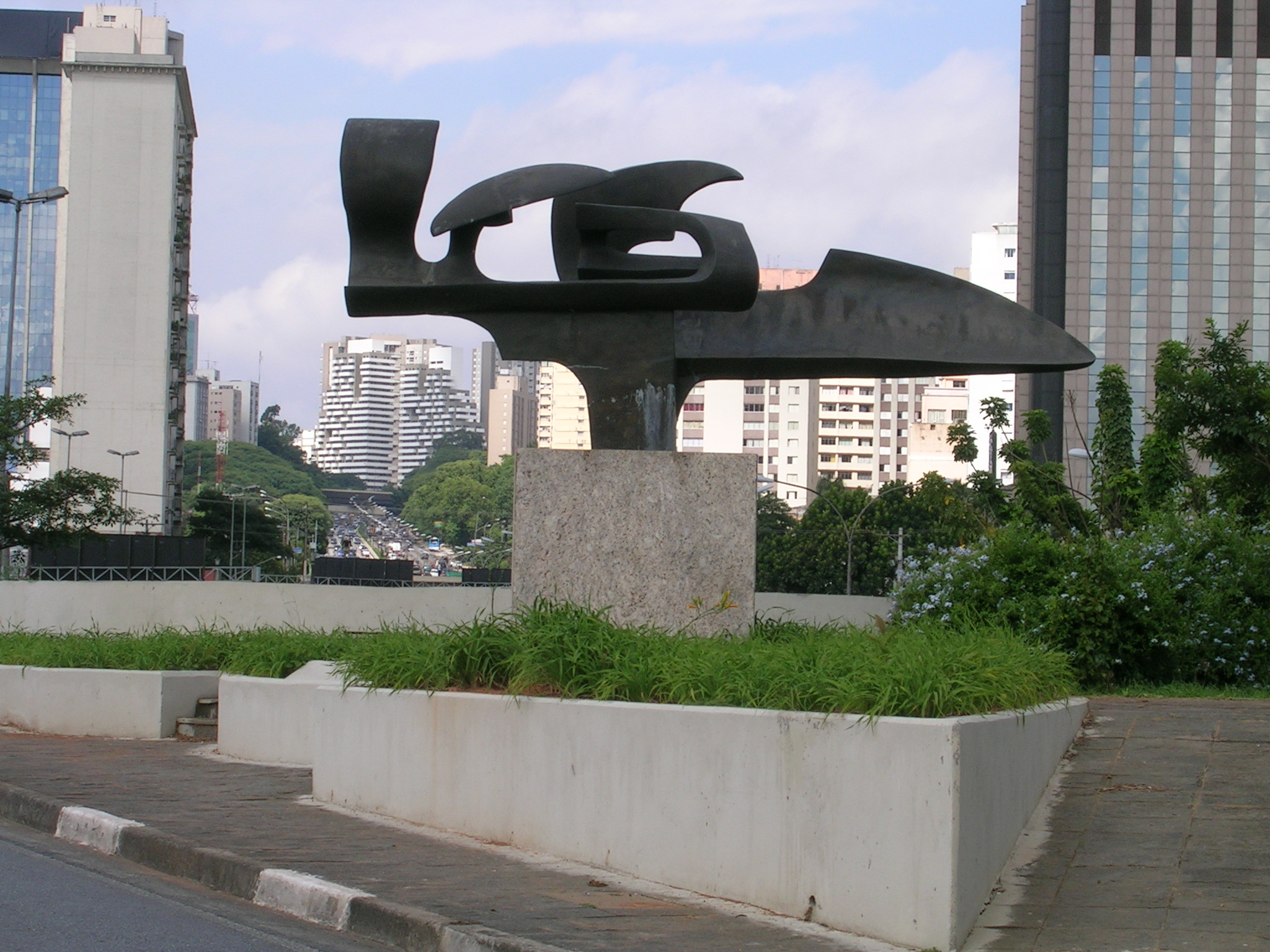
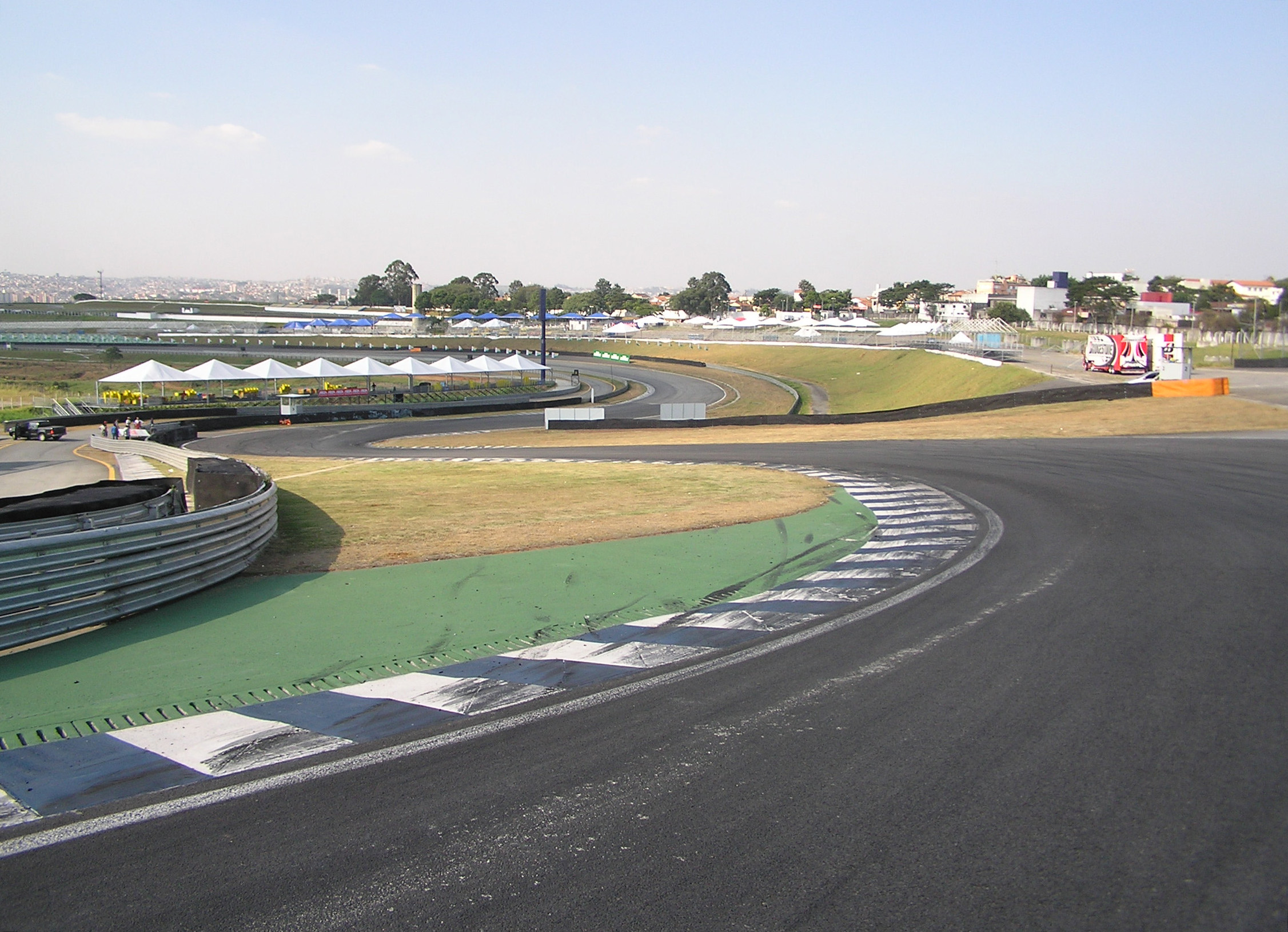
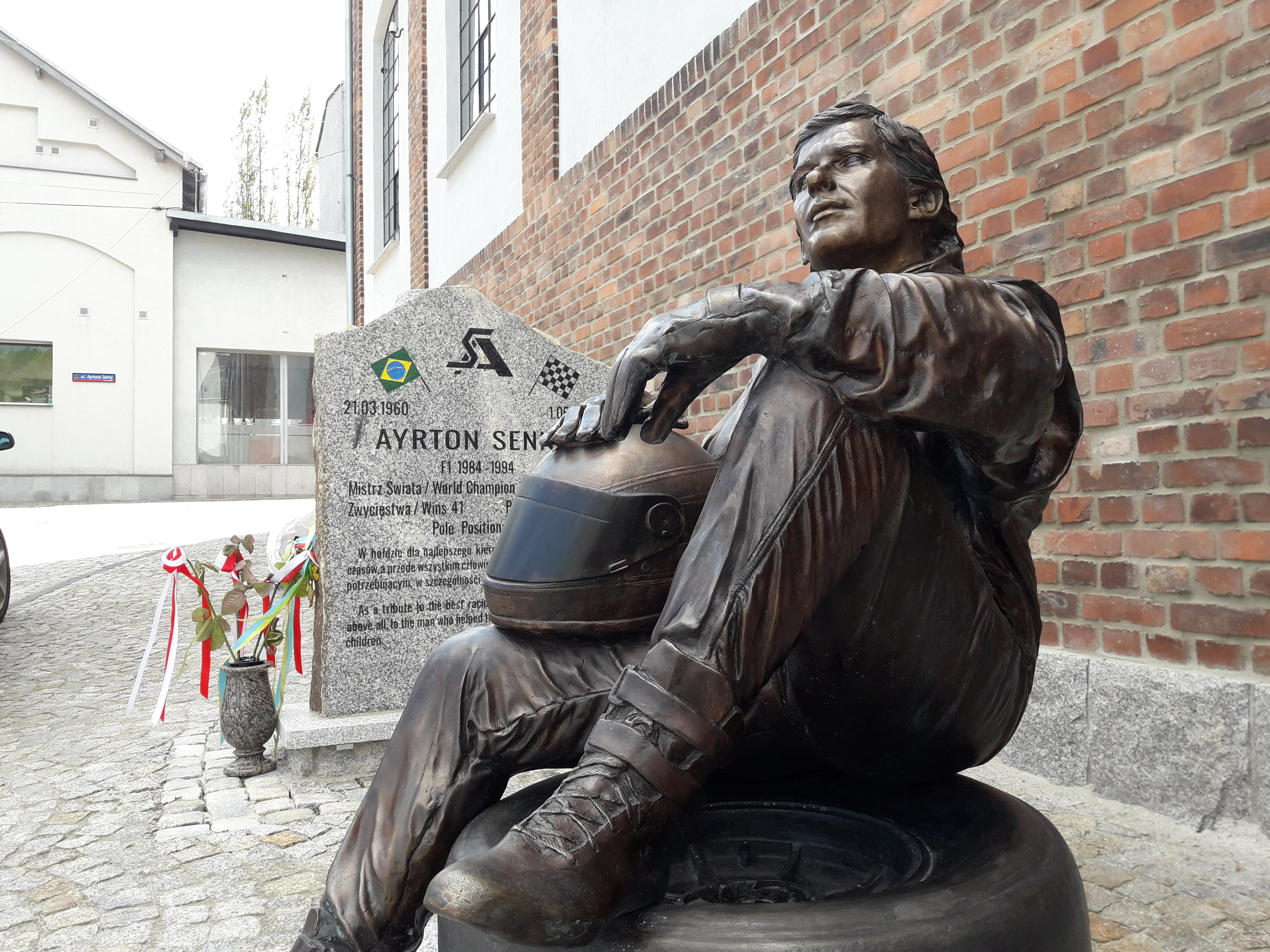
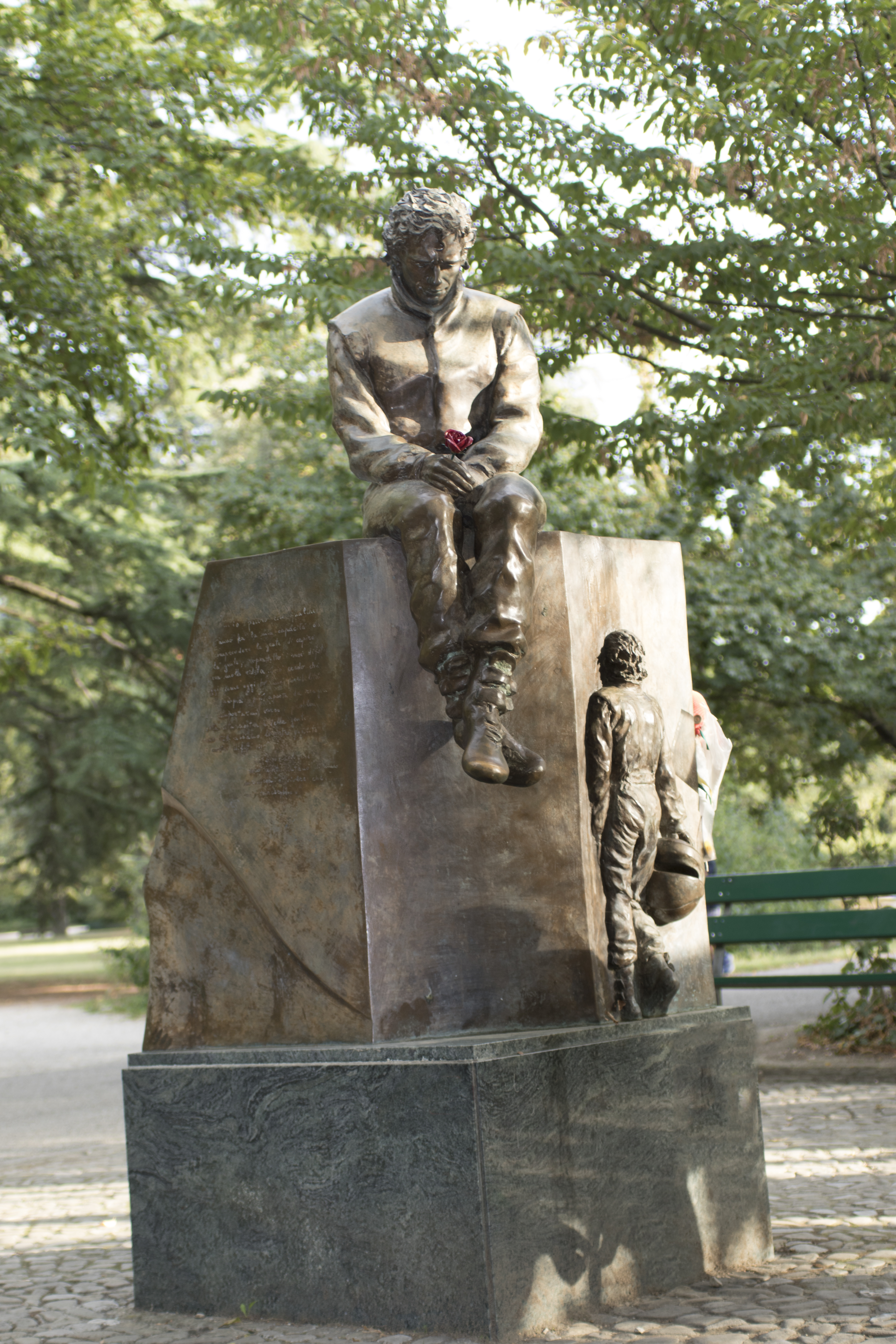
Clockwise from top left: A memorial in Ibirapuera Park; the Senna S at Interlagos; Senna's statue near the Imola Circuit; Senna's statue in Wałbrzych, Poland

Various tracks feature Senna memorials. A statue of Senna stands in a park in Imola, near the Autodromo Enzo e Dino Ferrari's Tamburello corner. Adelaide, reportedly one of Senna's favourite circuits and the track where he scored his final Formula One race win, installed a plaque bearing Senna's signature and hand prints in 1995, while the chicane at the end of the pit straight on the Adelaide Street Circuit has since been renamed the Senna Chicane. Monaco, where Senna triumphed a record six times, installed a plaque in Senna's honour at the Fairmont/Lowes hairpin in 2007. Adelaide, Interlagos, Jerez, Hockenheim, Montreal, Snetterton, Estoril, and Buenos Aires have all renamed portions of their track after Senna.

From 1995 to 2021, Williams included a small "S" logo on the front wing of all of its cars to honour Senna and support the IAS. Following the Williams family's sale of the team to Dorilton Capital, the logo was removed. The team announced plans to open a new space fully dedicated to the Brazilian driver in the Williams museum in Grove. In May 2022 McLaren announced that it would permanently feature the Senna "S" logo on their cars to celebrate the driver's contributions to the team.

In July 2013, Honda released an audio-visual tribute titled "Sound of Honda – Ayrton Senna 1989". Using the telemetry and sound of Senna's Honda-powered McLaren MP4/5, Honda recreated Senna's record-setting lap at the 1989 Japanese Grand Prix by positioning speakers and lights along the Suzuka Circuit. The lights traced Senna's real-life path and were synchronized to Senna's actual laptime.

Seven-time world champion Lewis Hamilton idolized Senna as a boy and has conducted various tributes for Senna throughout his career. When Hamilton matched Senna's three titles in 2015, Viviane Senna presented Hamilton with an Ian Berry artwork. Hamilton wore Senna tribute helmets at the Brazil races in 2011, 2015, and 2016, with the Senna family's support. When Hamilton matched Senna's 65 pole positions in 2017, the Senna family presented Hamilton with a race-worn Senna helmet. At the 2021 São Paulo Grand Prix, Hamilton delighted the crowd by waving a Brazilian flag during his victory lap, homaging Senna's victory celebration from the 1991 Brazilian Grand Prix (Senna's first-ever win in Brazil) thirty years earlier. The Brazilian government granted Hamilton honorary citizenship in 2022. Hamilton repeated the Brazilian flag tribute at the 2024 São Paulo Grand Prix, this time driving Senna's 1990 McLaren MP4/5B.

=== Permanent memorials to Senna ===
Statues of Senna have been erected in Barcelona, Rio de Janeiro, Wałbrzych, Estoril, Interlagos, Donington Park, and Imola—the site of his fatal crash. A life-sized 160 kg (352 lbs) bronze statue of Senna is housed in the McLaren Technology Centre in Surrey, England; it is a work by artist Paul Oz. Another sculpture named "Laureatta" housed in the Ayrton Senna Institute was a present from Japanese fans to celebrate all Senna's victories in F1. The Ayrton Senna monument at Imola was developed by Stefano Pierotti and completed in 1997. In 2024, the Imola statue site was vandalized on two occasions during the month of December, but the statue itself was not damaged.

In Brazil, a major freeway and tunnel in São Paulo and a freeway in Rio de Janeiro are named after Senna. Outside Brazil, Senna's name graces a road in Senna's favoured resort town of Quinta do Lago, Algarve, Portugal; a street in Tilehurst, Reading, England, where Senna lived during his years as a junior racer; a road in the Adelaide suburb of Wingfield; and a street and museum in Wałbrzych, Poland. Outside Earth, minor planet 6543 Senna is also named after Senna.

In September 2024, a property developer in collaboration with the Senna family announced plans to build the Senna Tower, a 550 m (1,800 ft) supertall residential skyscraper in Balneário Camboriú, Brazil.

=== Anniversary tributes ===
2004 marked the 10th anniversary of Senna's death. On 21 April 2004, Imola hosted a charity football match attended by over 10,000 people. The match featured members of Brazil's 1994 World Cup-winning team competing against an exhibition team of Formula One drivers. Viviane Senna presided at the kickoff. The match finished 5–5 and all profits were donated to the IAS. In addition, the book Ayrton: O Herói Revelado (Ayrton: The Hero Revealed) was published.

2010 marked the year of Senna's 50th birthday. In March, Senna's favourite football team, Corinthians, played a video in Senna's memory. On 25 July the BBC motoring show Top Gear paid an emotional tribute to Senna with British Formula One World Champion, Lewis Hamilton driving Senna's original MP4/4, with which he won the 1988 title. In October, StudioCanal, Working Title Films, and Midfield Films released Asif Kapadia's BAFTA-winning documentary Senna, which traces Senna's championship years at McLaren and his efforts to improve safety in the sport.

2014 marked the 20th anniversary of Senna's death. Many tributes took place to commemorate his life.

- The Imola Circuit hosted a memorial ceremony and moment of silence on 1 May 2014, the anniversary. Senna's friend Gerhard Berger and various drivers associated with Italy and Ferrari were in attendance.
- San Marino issued a series of commemorative stamps and silver proof coins.
- During the Brazilian Carnival celebrations, the samba group Unidos da Tijuca received a prize for a Senna-themed parade.
- Senna's birthday was marked by a Google Doodle.
- Brazilian regional airline Azul Linhas Aereas named a plane after Senna and painted it in the colours of Senna's helmet.
- French company Art Mint produced a series of commemorative coins designed by a Brazilian artist.
- British artist Ian Berry unveiled a portrait of Ayrton at the Instituto Ayrton Senna, with Senna's family in attendance.

2019 marked the 25th anniversary of Senna's death. The organisers of the 2019 Spanish Grand Prix presented race winner Lewis Hamilton with a half-Austrian, half-Brazilian flag in honour of Senna and Roland Ratzenberger.

=== Posthumous licensing of the Senna brand ===
The Instituto Ayrton Senna (IAS) occasionally licenses Senna's brand for various commercial and charitable enterprises, mostly related to motorsport.

- Ducati produced three special Senna editions of the Ducati 916 superbike (1996–1998) and the 1199 Panigale S Senna (2013).
- MV Agusta released two limited-edition motorbikes, the F4 750 Senna (2002) and the F4 Senna 1000 (2006). All profits were donated to the IAS.
- During the brief McLaren-Honda reunion in the 2010s, Honda and McLaren ran advertising campaigns recalling the Senna legend.
- In 2014, the IAS commissioned a commemorative Vespa that was auctioned off for charity. It was custom-painted in the colours of Senna's helmet, and its design recalled Piaggio's sponsorship gifts to Formula One polesitters.
- In 2017, McLaren Automotive produced the McLaren Senna, a 789-horsepower hypercar.
- In 2017, American firm Rosland Capital produced a series of commemorative coins featuring Senna.
- In 2018, Nike and the Corinthians football team unveiled a special Senna kit to commemorate Senna's first World Championship, with the tagline #LuteAtéSerEterno ["fight until you're eternal"].

== In popular culture ==
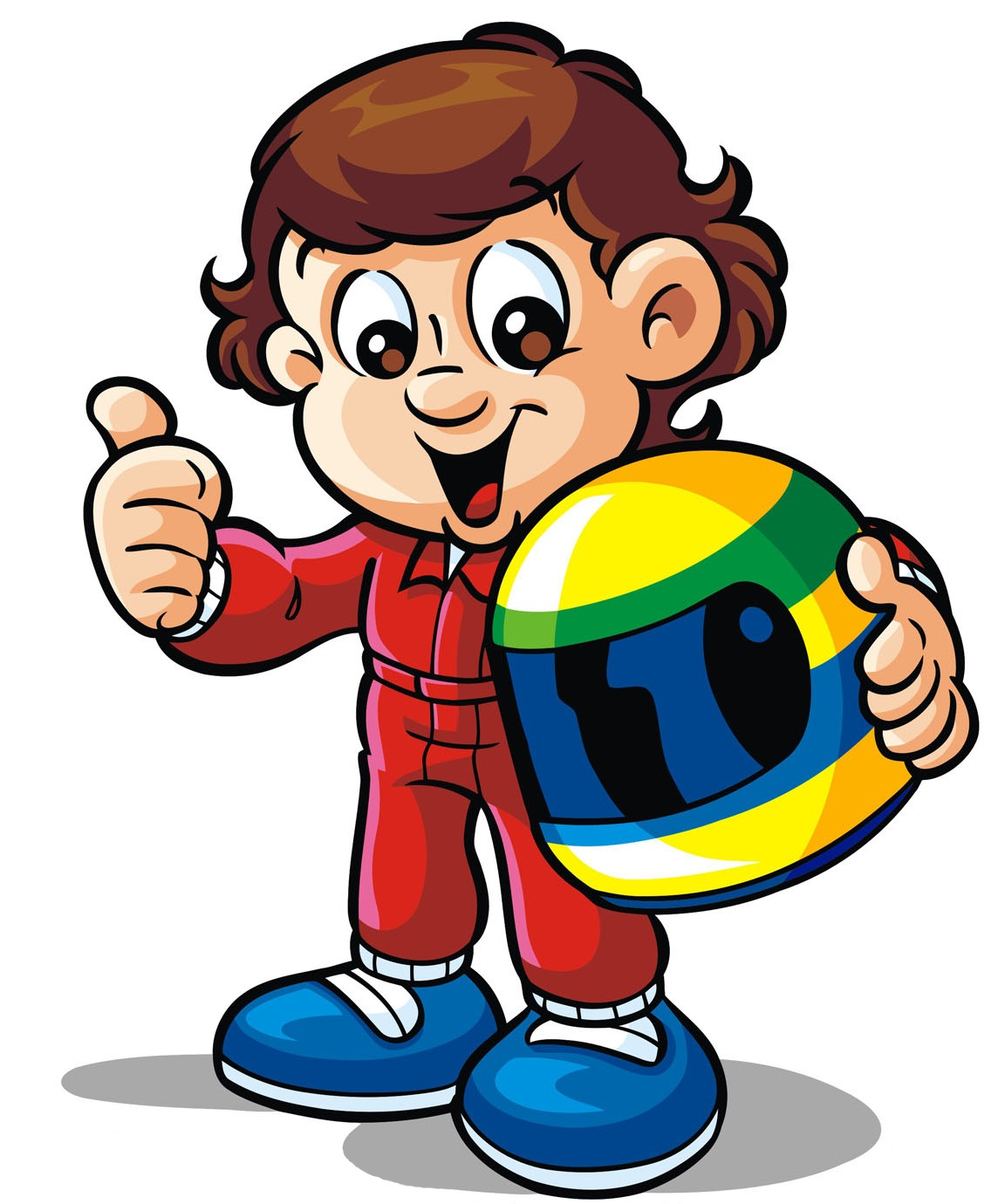
Senninha

As part of Japanese publisher Shueisha's sponsorship of McLaren, Senna collaborated with Akira Toriyama, the creator of Dragon Ball, on artwork for Weekly Shōnen Jump featuring McLaren-themed illustrations of Dragon Ball characters. Senna was also featured in GP Boy, a two-volume manga published in Weekly Shōnen Jump to commemorate Shueisha's sponsorship, and in F1 no Senkō, also published on Jump, which recounts the 1991 Formula One season from Senna's perspective.

Senna launched the cartoon character Senninha ("Little Senna") in 1993/94 to appeal to Brazilian children. A Senninha comic book ran from 1994 to 2000, with a brief relaunch in 2008. To this day the brand and character Senninha continues to be featured in many different products sold internationally and in the Brazilian market, part of the profits are reverted to the Instituto Ayrton Senna for the developing of educational projects.

Senna is mentioned in episode 151 of the Japanese animated series Gintama, along with two other F1 drivers, Jacques Villeneuve and Rubens Barrichello.

Senna's nephew Bruno voiced an animated depiction of his uncle in McLaren's Tooned cartoon series to commemorate McLaren's 50th anniversary. Episode 6 of the series' second season tells a fictionalized account of Senna's career with McLaren involving a rivalry with the character Professor M (voiced by Alexander Armstrong).

Sylvester Stallone said that Senna once contacted him with an offer to portray him in a biographical film and sent him his racing helmet; he added that the project did not materialize due to Senna's death but Stallone was able to re-direct his racing research and preparation into Driven in 2001.

In 2024, Netflix released an eponymous biographical miniseries based on Senna's life, starring Gabriel Leone as Senna.

Senna has been referenced by several songwriters:

- Portuguese rock band Os Pontos Negros have a song titled "Senna" in their 2012 Soba Lobi album
- Italian rock band The Rock Alchemist's 2012 song "Live or Die" and its accompanying 2018 music video are inspired by the life and character of Senna
- Jazz pianist Kim Pensyl (song called "Senna's Samba")
- Japanese jazz-fusion guitarist and T-square bandleader Masahiro Andoh (references in songs such as "Faces" and subsequent revisions, like "The Face")
- Chris Rea (on his song "Saudade")
- Spanish band Delorean (extended play called Ayrton Senna)
- British acid jazz band Corduroy (song called "Ayrton Senna")
- Italian singer-songwriter Lucio Dalla (song titled "Ayrton")
- Finnish rapper Paperi-T (on his song Mainstream-solo)

== Helmet design ==
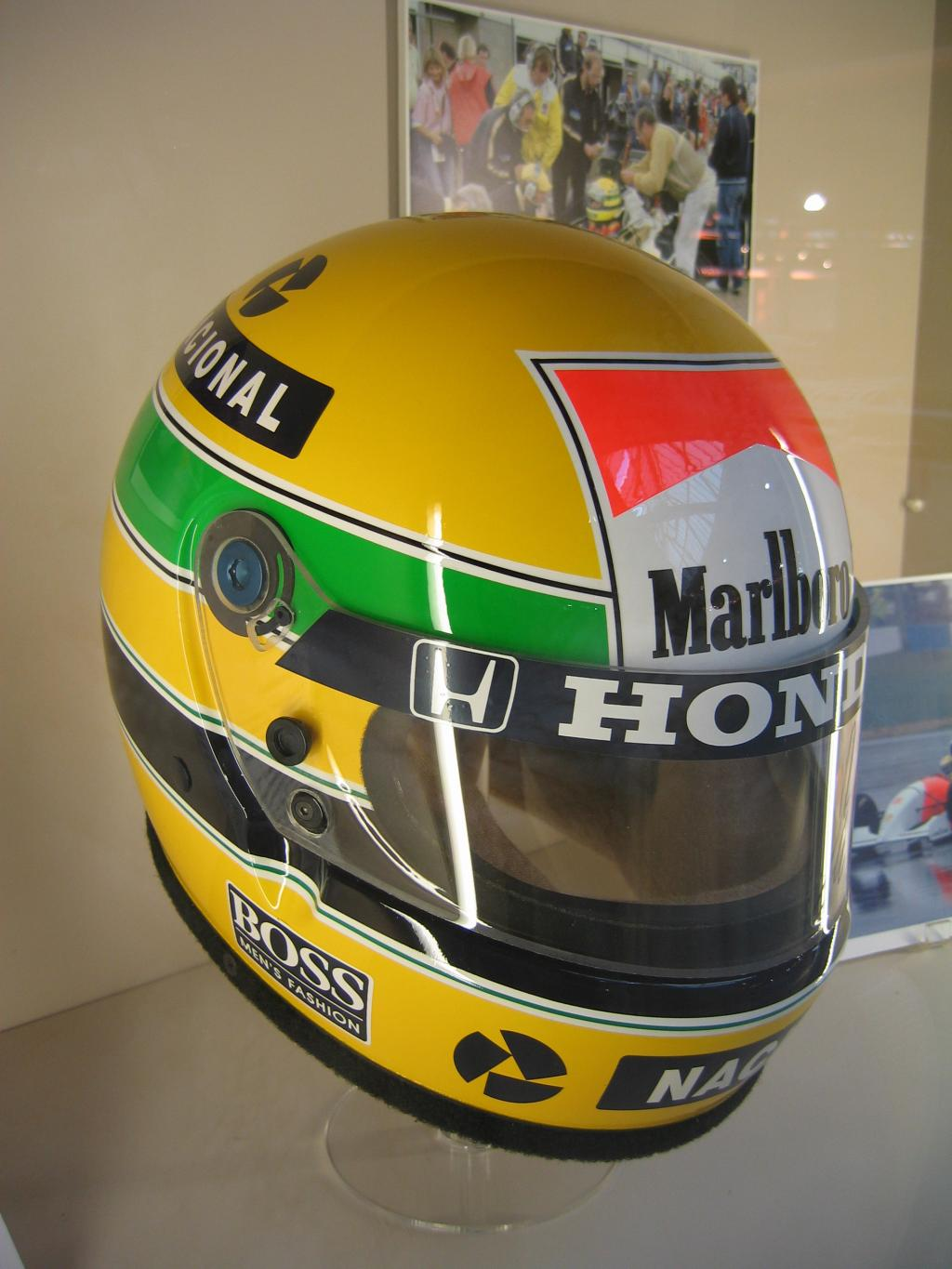
Senna's helmet bearing the colours of the Brazilian national flag

In his karting days, Senna's helmet consisted of a plain white background with notable features absent. He experimented with several designs to satisfy him, such as a white, yellow, and green helmet, before settling on a design by Sid Mosca that included a yellow background with a green stripe surrounding the upper visor and a light metallic blue stripe surrounding the lower visor (both stripes are delineated in the other stripe's color) that was first seen in 1979. Mosca also painted helmets for Emerson Fittipaldi and Nelson Piquet.

According to Mosca, the blue and green stripes symbolised movement and aggression, while the overall yellow colour symbolised youth; the three colors were also identifiable with the flag of Brazil. The helmet never had significant changes, apart from sponsorship. One such change was that Senna occasionally altered the stripe from blue to black. The tone of yellow changed a number of times, while usually a rich sunburst yellow, in 1985 and 1986 in some races, he used a fluorescent neon yellow colour. In 1994, the helmet was a lighter, paler yellow to complement the blue and white of the Williams car.

Senna used a number of helmet brands throughout his career. From 1977 to 1989, he used Bell (Star from 1977 to 1982 and XFM-1 from 1983 to 1989). From 1990 to 1991, he used Honda's own Rheos brand. From 1992 to 1993, he used Shoei (X-4). For 1994, he returned to using Bell (M3 Kevlar). The helmet worn by Senna in the fatal race was returned to Bell in 2002 and was incinerated while family members watched.

=== Third-party adaptations ===
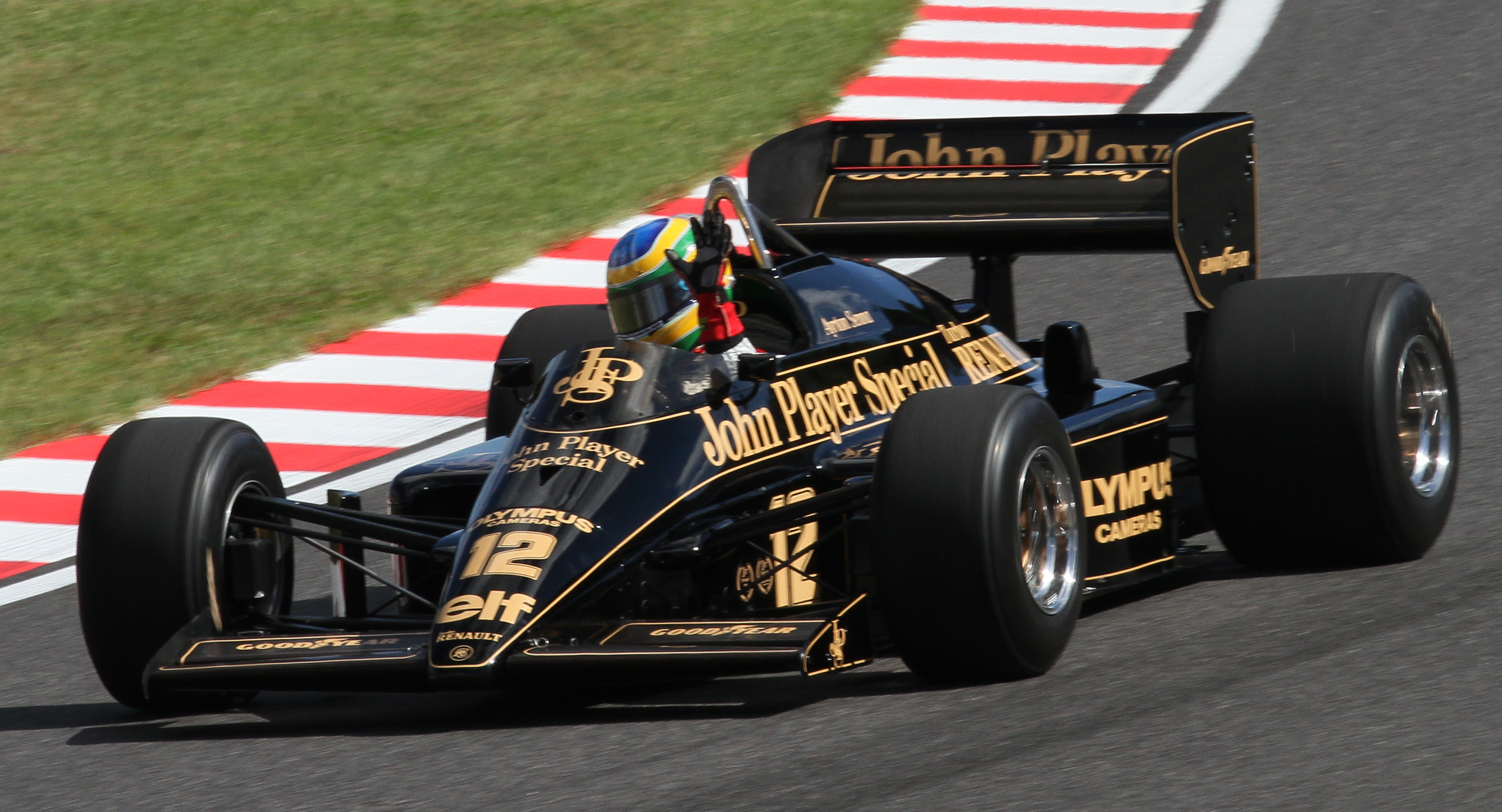
Bruno Senna's helmet design is an adaptation of his uncle's (seen here parading the 1985 Lotus 97T at the 2010 Japanese Grand Prix).

Senna's nephew Bruno wore a modified version of his helmet design (a yellow helmet with a green and blue stripe) during his Formula One career. The stripes were shaped after an S rather than being straight, there was a green stripe under the chin, and there was a blue rounded rectangle near the top. Bruno sported a modified helmet design for the final three races of the 2011 season to honour the 20th anniversary of Senna's last world championship.

At the 1995 Brazilian Grand Prix, Rubens Barrichello incorporated part of Senna's helmet design into his own. As mentioned above, Lewis Hamilton has also worn Senna tribute helmets on several occasions.

Outside of motor racing, Brazilian cyclist Murilo Fischer wore a helmet based on Senna's helmet colour scheme of yellow with green and blue stripes on stage 11 of the 2015 Giro d'Italia, which finished on the Imola circuit. For the 2020 Emilia Romagna Grand Prix at Imola, Pierre Gasly wore a special helmet with Senna's colours and the Senna Sempre (Senna Forever) badging on top.

== Awards and honours ==
- Brazil
  - Commander of the Order of Rio Branco (1992)
  - Grand Cross of the National Order of Merit (1994; posthumous)
  - Grand Cross of the Order of Ipiranga (1994; posthumous)

== Karting record ==
=== Karting career summary ===
Season	Series	Team	Position
1975	Brazilian Championship — Junior		2nd
1976	Brazilian Championship — 100cc		3rd
1977	Brazilian Championship — 100cc		2nd
1977	South American Championship — 100cc		1st
1978	Brazilian Championship — 100cc		1st
1978	CIK-FIA World Championship — Senior	DAP	6th
1979	Brazilian Championship — 100cc		2nd
1979	South American Championship — 100cc		2nd
1979	CIK-FIA World Championship — Senior	DAP	2nd
1980	Brazilian Championship — 100cc		1st
1980	South American Championship — 100cc		1st
1980	CIK-FIA World Championship — Senior	DAP	2nd
1981	CIK-FIA World Championship — Senior	DAP	4th
1982	CIK-FIA World Championship — Senior	DAP	14th

== Racing record ==
=== Racing career summary ===
Season	Series	Team	Races	Wins	Poles	F/Laps	Podiums	Points	Position
1981	RAC Formula Ford 1600	Van Diemen	6	4	0	5	5	—N/a	**1st**
1981	Townsend-Thoresen Formula Ford 1600	Van Diemen	13	8	3	5	13	210	**1st**
1981	P&O Ferries British Formula Ford 1600	Van Diemen	1	0	0	0	0	0	NC
1982	British Formula Ford 2000	Rushen Green	17	15	7	16	17	378	**1st**
1982	European Formula Ford 2000	Rushen Green	8	6	6	7	6	138	**1st**
1982	Formula Ford 2000 UK Celebrity Race	Rushen Green	1	1	0	1	1	—N/a	**1st**
1982	Marlboro British Formula Three	West Surrey Racing	1	1	1	1	1	—N/a	NC
1983	Marlboro British Formula Three	West Surrey Racing	18	13	14	12	15	132	**1st**
1983	FIA European Formula Three	West Surrey Racing	1	0	0	0	0	0	NC
1983	Macau Grand Prix	West Surrey Racing w/ Theodore Racing	1	1	1	0	1	N/A	**1st**
1984	Formula One	Toleman Motorsport	14	0	0	1	3	13	9th
1984	World Sportscar Championship	New-Man Joest Racing	1	0	0	0	0	3	82nd
1984	Nürburgring Race of Champions	—N/a	1	1	0	1	1	—N/a	**1st**
1985	Formula One	John Player Special Team Lotus	16	2	7	3	6	38	4th
1986	Formula One	John Player Special Team Lotus	16	2	8	0	8	55	4th
1987	Formula One	Camel Team Lotus Honda	16	2	1	3	8	57	**3rd**
1988	Formula One	Honda Marlboro McLaren	16	8	13	3	11	90	**1st**
1989	Formula One	Honda Marlboro McLaren	16	6	13	3	7	60	**2nd**
1990	Formula One	Honda Marlboro McLaren	16	6	10	2	11	78	**1st**
1991	Formula One	Honda Marlboro McLaren	16	7	8	2	12	96	**1st**
1992	Formula One	Honda Marlboro McLaren	16	3	1	1	7	50	4th
1993	Formula One	Marlboro McLaren	16	5	1	1	7	73	**2nd**
1994	Formula One	Rothmans Williams Renault	3	0	3	0	0	0	NC

=== Complete British Formula Three Championship results ===
(key) (Races in bold indicate pole position) (Races in italics indicate fastest lap)

Year	Entrant	Engine	1	2	3	4	5	6	7	8	9	10	11	12	13	14	15	16	17	18	19	20	DC	Pts
1983	West Surrey Racing	Toyota	SIL; 1	**THR**; 1	**SIL**; 1	**DON**; 1	**THR**; 1	**SIL**; 1	**THR**; 1	**BRH**; 1	**SIL**; 1	SIL; Ret	**CAD**; DNS	SNE; Ret	**SIL**; 1	**DON**; 2	OUL; Ret	**SIL**; 1	**OUL**; Ret	**THR**; Ret	SIL; 2	**THR**; 1	**1st**	**132**

=== Complete Macau Grand Prix results ===
Year	Team	Chassis/Engine	Qualifying	Race1	Race2	Overall ranking	Ref
1983	(United Kingdom) West Surrey Racing	Ralt・Toyota	1st	**1**	**1**	**1st**	

=== Complete Formula One results ===
(key) (Races in bold indicate pole position; races in italics indicate fastest lap)

Year	Team	Chassis	Engine	1	2	3	4	5	6	7	8	9	10	11	12	13	14	15	16	WDC	Pts
1984	Toleman Group Motorsport	Toleman TG183B	Hart 415T 1.5 L4 t	BRA; Ret	RSA; 6	BEL; 6	SMR; DNQ													9th	13
1984	Toleman Group Motorsport	Toleman TG184	Hart 415T 1.5 L4 t					FRA; Ret	MON; 2^{‡}	CAN; 7	DET; Ret	DAL; Ret	GBR; 3	GER; Ret	AUT; Ret	NED; Ret	ITA	EUR; Ret	POR; 3	9th	13
1985	John Player Special Team Lotus	Lotus 97T	Renault EF15 1.5 V6 t	BRA; Ret	**POR**; 1	**SMR**; 7^{†}	**MON**; Ret	CAN; 16	**DET**; Ret	FRA; Ret	GBR; 10^{†}	GER; Ret	AUT; 2	NED; 3	**ITA**; 3	BEL; 1	**EUR**; 2	RSA; Ret	**AUS**; Ret	4th	38
1986	John Player Special Team Lotus	Lotus 98T	Renault EF15B 1.5 V6 t	**BRA**; 2	**ESP**; 1	**SMR**; Ret	MON; 3	BEL; 2	CAN; 5	**DET**; 1	**FRA**; Ret	GBR; Ret	GER; 2	**HUN**; 2	AUT; Ret	ITA; Ret	**POR**; 4^{†}	**MEX**; 3	AUS; Ret	4th	55
1987	Camel Team Lotus Honda	Lotus 99T	Honda RA166E 1.5 V6 t	BRA; Ret	**SMR**; 2	BEL; Ret	MON; 1	DET; 1	FRA; 4	GBR; 3	GER; 3	HUN; 2	AUT; 5	ITA; 2	POR; 7	ESP; 5	MEX; Ret	JPN; 2	AUS; DSQ	**3rd**	**57**
1988	Honda Marlboro McLaren	McLaren MP4/4	Honda RA168E 1.5 V6 t	**BRA**; DSQ	**SMR**; 1	**MON**; Ret	**MEX**; 2	**CAN**; 1	**DET**; 1	FRA; 2	GBR; 1	**GER**; 1	**HUN**; 1	**BEL**; 1	**ITA**; 10^{†}	POR; 6	**ESP**; 4	**JPN**; 1	**AUS**; 2	**1st**	**90 (94)**
1989	Honda Marlboro McLaren	McLaren MP4/5	Honda RA109E 3.5 V10	**BRA**; 11	**SMR**; 1	**MON**; 1	**MEX**; 1	**USA**; Ret	CAN; 7^{†}	FRA; Ret	**GBR**; Ret	**GER**; 1	HUN; 2	**BEL**; 1	**ITA**; Ret	**POR**; Ret	**ESP**; 1	**JPN**; DSQ	**AUS**; Ret	**2nd**	**60**
1990	Honda Marlboro McLaren	McLaren MP4/5B	Honda RA100E 3.5 V10	USA; 1	**BRA**; 3	**SMR**; Ret	**MON**; 1	**CAN**; 1	MEX; 20^{†}	FRA; 3	GBR; 3	**GER**; 1	HUN; 2	**BEL**; 1	**ITA**; 1	POR; 2	**ESP**; Ret	**JPN**; Ret	**AUS**; Ret	**1st**	**78**
1991	Honda Marlboro McLaren	McLaren MP4/6	Honda RA121E 3.5 V12	**USA**; 1	**BRA**; 1	**SMR**; 1	**MON**; 1	CAN; Ret	MEX; 3	FRA; 3	GBR; 4^{†}	GER; 7^{†}	**HUN**; 1	**BEL**; 1	**ITA**; 2	POR; 2	ESP; 5	JPN; 2	**AUS**; 1^{‡}	**1st**	**96**
1992	Honda Marlboro McLaren	McLaren MP4/6B	Honda RA122E 3.5 V12	RSA; 3	MEX; Ret															4th	50
1992	Honda Marlboro McLaren	McLaren MP4/7A	Honda RA122E/B 3.5 V12			BRA; Ret	ESP; 9^{†}	SMR; 3	MON; 1	**CAN**; Ret	FRA; Ret	GBR; Ret	GER; 2	HUN; 1	BEL; 5	ITA; 1	POR; 3	JPN; Ret	AUS; Ret	4th	50
1993	Marlboro McLaren	McLaren MP4/8	Ford-Cosworth HBE7 3.5 V8	RSA; 2	BRA; 1	EUR; 1	SMR; Ret	ESP; 2	MON; 1	CAN; 18^{†}	FRA; 4	GBR; 5^{†}								**2nd**	**73**
1993	Marlboro McLaren	McLaren MP4/8	Ford HBA8 3.5 V8										GER; 4	HUN; Ret	BEL; 4	ITA; Ret	POR; Ret	JPN; 1	**AUS**; 1	**2nd**	**73**
1994	Rothmans Williams Renault	Williams FW16	Renault RS6 3.5 V10	**BRA**; Ret	**PAC**; Ret	**SMR**; **Ret**	MON	ESP	CAN	FRA	GBR	GER	HUN	BEL	ITA	POR	EUR	JPN	AUS	NC	0

^{‡} Half points awarded as less than 75% of race distance was completed.
^{†} Driver did not finish the Grand Prix but was classified as he completed over 90% of the race distance.

=== Complete World Sportscar Championship results ===
(key) (Races in bold indicate pole position) (Races in italics indicate fastest lap)

Year	Entrant	Class	Chassis	Engine	1	2	3	4	5	6	7	8	9	10	11	Pos.	Pts
1984	New-Man Joest Racing	C1	Porsche 956	Porsche Type-935 2.6 F6 t	MNZ	SIL	LMS	NÜR; 8	BRH	MOS	SPA	IMO	FUJ	KYA	SAN	82nd	3

=== Formula One records ===
Senna holds the following Formula One driver records:

Record		Achieved	Ref
**Most consecutive pole positions**	8 (Note: Record shared with Max Verstappen.)	1988 Spanish Grand Prix – 1989 United States Grand Prix	
**Most consecutive front row starts**	24	1988 German Grand Prix – 1989 Australian Grand Prix	
**Most consecutive wins at the same Grand Prix**	5 (Note: Record shared with Lewis Hamilton at the Spanish Grand Prix.)	Monaco Grand Prix (1989–1993)	
**Most consecutive pole positions at the same Grand Prix**	7	San Marino Grand Prix (1985–1991)	
**Highest percentage of front row starts in a season**	100% (Note: Record shared with Alain Prost (1993) and Damon Hill (1996).)	1989	

== Sources ==
- Collings, Timothy; Edworthy, Sarah (2002). The Formula One Years: A Season-by-Season Account of the World's Premier Motor Racing Championship from 1950 to the Present Day. Carlton Books.
- Hilton, Christopher (1994). Ayrton Senna: The Second Coming. PSL. ISBN 9781852604837.
- Hilton, Christopher (1999). Ayrton Senna: As Time Goes By. Haynes. ISBN 9781859606117.
- Hilton, Christopher (2004). Ayrton Senna: The Whole Story. Haynes.
- Hilton, Christopher (2005). Grand Prix century. Haynes.
- Hughes, Mark; Arron, Simon (2003). The Complete Book of Formula One. Motorbooks International.
- Jones, Bruce, ed. (1999). 50 Years of the Formula One World Championship. Carlton.
- Ménard, Pierre; Vassal, Jacques (2003). Alain Prost: The Science of Racing. Formula 1 Legends Series. Chronosports Editeur. ISBN 2-84707-062-1.
- Rubython, Tom (2004). The Life of Senna.
- Rubython, Tom (2005). The Life of Senna: The Biography of Ayrton Senna. BusinessF1 Books. ISBN 9780954685737.

Sporting positions
Preceded by Roberto Moreno	British Formula Ford Champion; 1981	Succeeded by Julian Bailey
Preceded by Tommy Byrne	British Formula Three Champion; 1983	Succeeded by Johnny Dumfries
Preceded by Roberto Moreno	Macau Grand Prix Winner; 1983	Succeeded by John Nielsen
Preceded by Nelson Piquet	Formula One World Champion; 1988	Succeeded by Alain Prost
Preceded by Alain Prost	Formula One World Champion; 1990–1991	Succeeded by Nigel Mansell
Preceded by James Hunt	Latest Born F1 Champion To Die; 1 May 1994 – present	Incumbent
Preceded by Roland Ratzenberger	Formula One fatal accidents 1 May 1994	Succeeded by Jules Bianchi
Awards and achievements
Preceded by Nigel Mansell	Autosport; International Racing Driver Award; 1988	Succeeded by Jean Alesi
Preceded by Jean Alesi	Autosport; International Racing Driver Award; 1990–1991	Succeeded by Nigel Mansell
Preceded by Greg LeMond	L'Équipe Champion of Champions; 1990	Succeeded by Carl Lewis
