= François Hesnault =

French racing driver (born 1956)

- Born: 30 December 1956 (age 69); Neuilly-sur-Seine, Hauts-de-Seine, France

Formula One World Championship career
- Nationality: (France) French
- Active years: 1984–1985
- Team(s): Ligier, Brabham, Renault
- Entries: 21 (19 starts)
- Championships: 0
- Wins: 0
- Podiums: 0
- Career points: 0
- Pole positions: 0
- Fastest laps: 0
- First entry: 1984 Brazilian Grand Prix
- Last entry: 1985 German Grand Prix

François Hesnault (born 30 December 1956) is a former racing driver from France. He participated in 21 Formula One Grands Prix, debuting on 25 March 1984. He scored no championship points.

Hesnault was born to a wealthy family who owned a large transport business. He did his military service in the French parachute corps and was involved in action in West Africa. Hesnault made his racing debut competing in the French Formula Renault in 1980. He enjoyed some success in the French Formula Three Championship, finishing third in the series with two race victories in 1982 and second in 1983 with five race wins and battled Michel Ferté for the series title that he lost out by two points. Hesnault competed in the 24 Hours of Le Mans twice, firstly in 1982 and again in 1983.

Hesnault debuted in Formula One in the 1984 season with Ligier, with a best result of seventh at the Dutch Grand Prix. For the 1985 season, he was hired to be Nelson Piquet's teammate at Brabham, but he was sacked after four uncompetitive races. He returned for a one-off at the German Grand Prix in a third Renault which carried a prototype onboard camera, making it the first use of this technology in a Grand Prix. This is also the last race in which three cars have been entered for the same team (current third drivers are not eligible to compete in the races). After this race, Hesnault retired from motor racing, having suffered a particularly heavy crash in testing at Circuit Paul Ricard shortly before parting company with Brabham.

== Racing results ==
=== Complete Formula One World Championship results ===
(key)

Year	Entrant	Chassis	Engine	1	2	3	4	5	6	7	8	9	10	11	12	13	14	15	16	WDC	Points
1984	Ligier Loto	Ligier JS23	Renault V6 (t/c)	BRA; Ret	RSA; 10	BEL; Ret	SMR; Ret	FRA; DNS	MON; Ret	CAN; Ret	DET; Ret	DAL; Ret	GBR; Ret	GER; 8	AUT; 8	NED; 7	ITA; Ret	EUR; 10	POR; Ret	NC	0
1985	Motor Racing Developments	Brabham BT54	BMW S4 (t/c)	BRA; Ret	POR; Ret	SMR; Ret	MON; DNQ	CAN	DET	FRA	GBR									NC	0
1985	Equipe Renault Elf	Renault RE60	Renault V6 (t/c)									GER; Ret	AUT	NED	ITA	BEL	EUR	RSA	AUS	NC	0

=== 24 Hours of Le Mans results ===
Year	Team	Co-Drivers	Car	Class	Laps	Pos.	Class Pos.
1982	(Switzerland) C. Haldi	(Switzerland) Claude Haldi (Panama) Rodrigo Terran	Porsche 934/5	Gr.5 SP	141	DNF	DNF
1983	(France) A.S. École Supérieure de Tourisme	(France) Thierry Perrier (France) Bernard Salam	Lancia LC1	Gr.C	133	NC	NC
