= Ligier JS23 =

Ligier JS23 Ligier JS23B
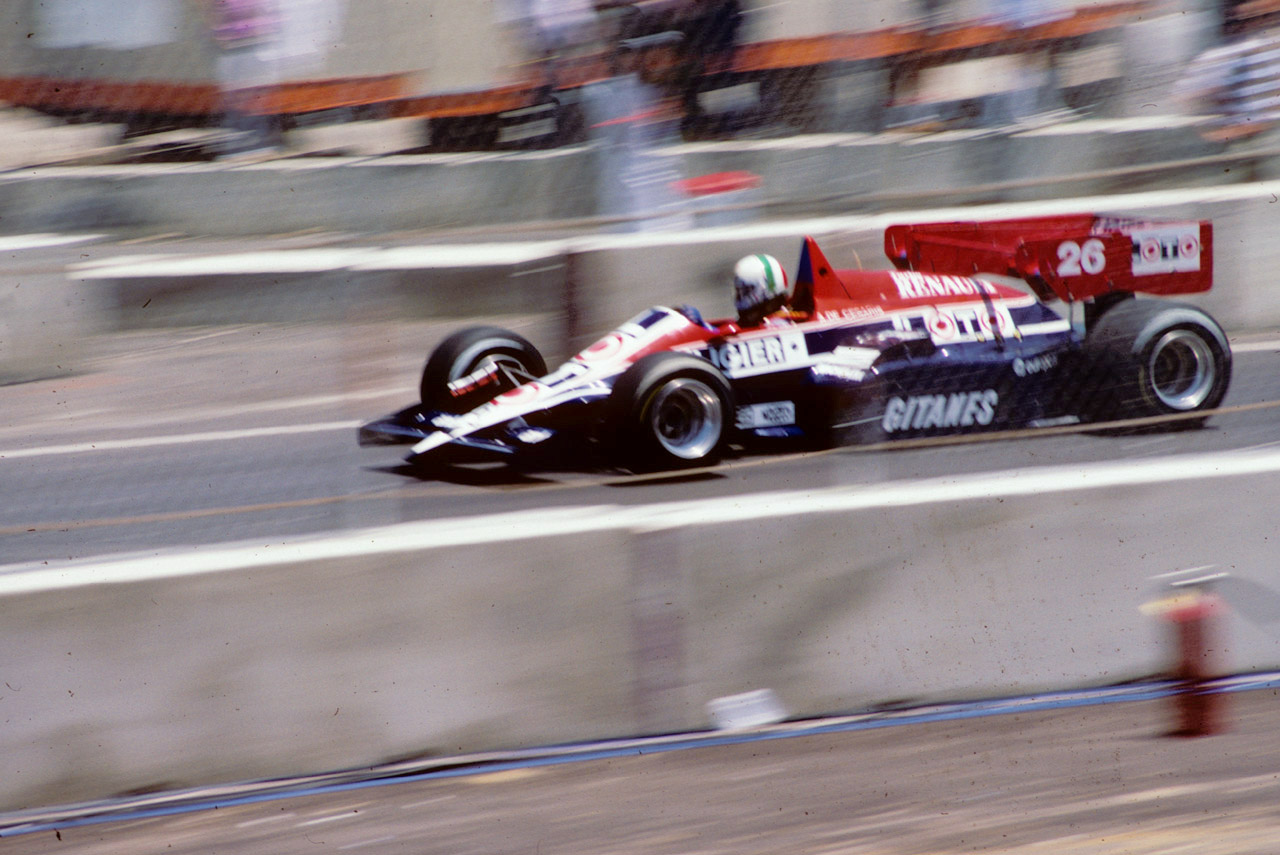
- Andrea de Cesaris driving the JS23 at the 1984 Dallas Grand Prix
- Category: Formula One
- Constructor: Ligier
- Designers: Michel Beaujon (Technical Director); Claude Galopin (Chief Designer); Henri Durand (Head of Aerodynamics)
- Predecessor: JS21
- Successor: JS25

Technical specifications
- Chassis: Carbon fibre Monocoque
- Suspension (front): Double wishbones, pushrods
- Suspension (rear): Double wishbones, pushrods
- Axle track: Front: 1,800 mm (71 in); Rear: 1,652 mm (65.0 in)
- Wheelbase: 2,810 mm (111 in)
- Engine: Renault Gordini EF4, 1,492 cc (91.0 cu in), 90° V6, turbo, mid-engine, longitudinally mounted
- Transmission: Ligier / Hewland 5-speed manual
- Weight: 540 kg (1,190 lb)
- Fuel: Elf
- Tyres: Michelin

Competition history
- Notable entrants: Ligier Loto
- Notable drivers: 25. (France) François Hesnault; 26. (Italy) Andrea de Cesaris
- Debut: 1984 Brazilian Grand Prix
- Last event: 1984 Portuguese Grand Prix
Races	Wins	Poles	F/Laps
16	0	0	0
- Constructors' Championships: 0
- Drivers' Championships: 0

The Ligier JS23 was a Formula One car designed by Michel Beaujon and Claude Galopin for the Ligier team for use in the 1984 Formula One season. The car was powered by a turbocharged Renault V6 engine and ran on Michelin tyres. Drivers of the car during 1984 were François Hesnault and Andrea de Cesaris.

1984 wasn't a successful year for Ligier with de Cesaris scoring all three points Ligier earned meaning the French team finished 9th in the Constructors Championship. De Cesaris actually scored the three points with a 5th place at the 2nd race of the season in South Africa and a 6th place two races later in San Marino.

The JS23 was replaced for the 1985 season by the Ligier JS25.

== Complete Formula One results ==
(key)

Year	Team	Chassis	Engine	Tyres	Drivers	1	2	3	4	5	6	7	8	9	10	11	12	13	14	15	16	Pts.	WCC
1984	Équipe Ligier Loto		Renault EF4 V6tc	MI		BRA	RSA	BEL	SMR	FRA	MON	CAN	DET	DAL	GBR	GER	AUT	NED	ITA	EUR	POR	3	9th
1984	Équipe Ligier Loto	JS23	Renault EF4 V6tc	MI	François Hesnault	Ret	10	Ret	Ret	DNS	Ret	Ret	Ret	Ret	Ret	8	8	7	Ret	10	Ret	3	9th
1984	Équipe Ligier Loto	JS23	Renault EF4 V6tc	MI	Andrea de Cesaris	Ret	5	Ret	6	10	Ret	Ret	Ret	Ret	10	7	Ret	Ret	Ret			3	9th
1984	Équipe Ligier Loto	JS23B	Renault EF4 V6tc	MI	Andrea de Cesaris															7	12	3	9th
