= Ligier JS25 =

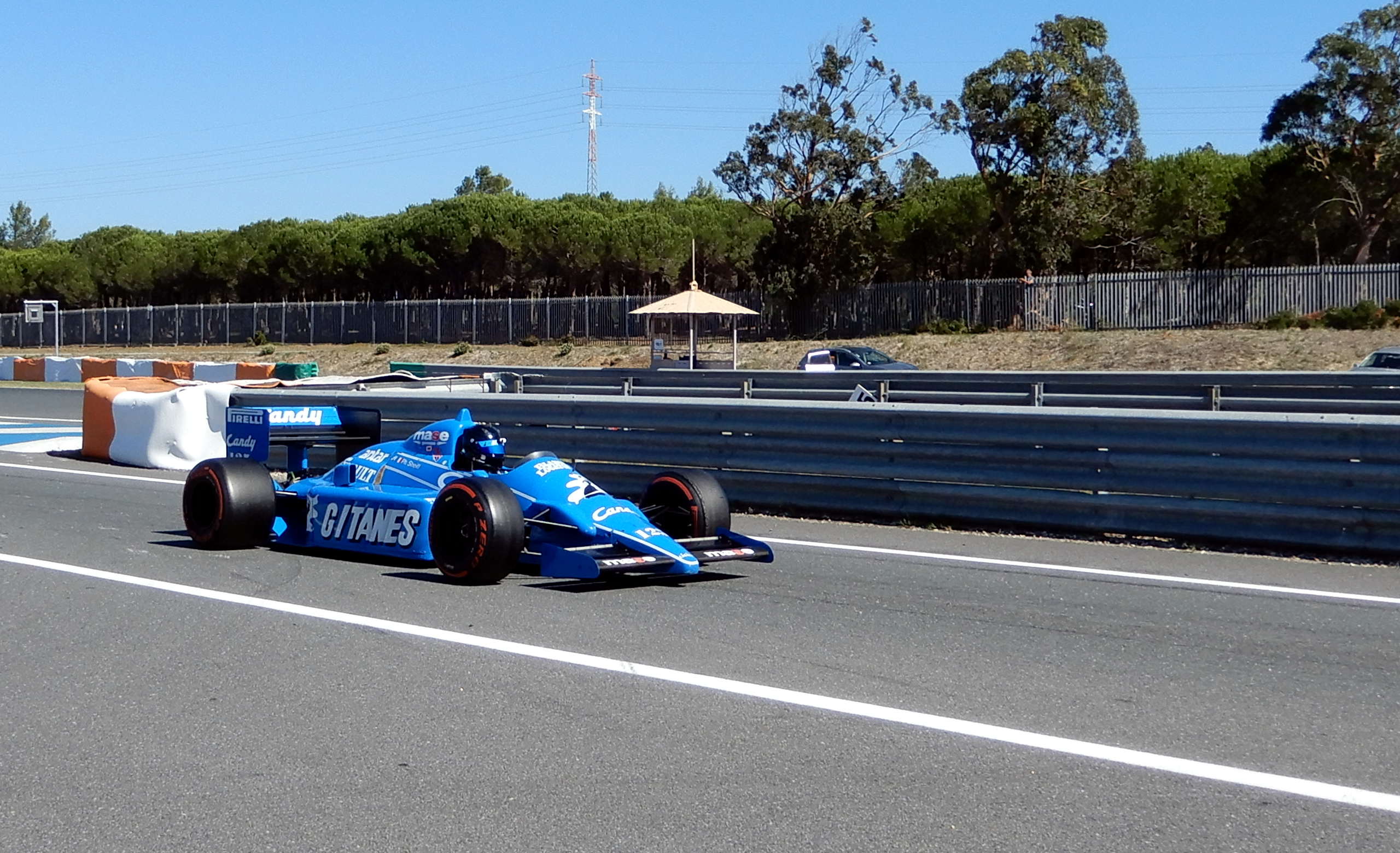
- Category: Formula One
- Constructor: Ligier
- Designers: Michel Beaujon (Technical Director); Claude Galopin (Chief Designer); Henri Durand (Head of Aerodynamics)
- Predecessor: JS23
- Successor: JS27

Technical specifications
- Chassis: Carbon fibre and Kevlar Monocoque
- Suspension (front): Double wishbones, pushrods
- Suspension (rear): Double wishbones, pushrods
- Axle track: Front: 1,790 mm (70 in); Rear: 1,662 mm (65.4 in)
- Wheelbase: 2,835 mm (111.6 in)
- Engine: Renault Gordini EF4B, 1,492 cc (91.0 cu in), 90° V6, turbo, mid-engine, longitudinally mounted
- Transmission: Hewland 5-speed manual
- Weight: 540 kg (1,190 lb)
- Fuel: Antar
- Tyres: Pirelli

Competition history
- Notable entrants: Équipe Ligier Gitanes
- Notable drivers: 25. (Italy) Andrea de Cesaris; 25. (France) Philippe Streiff; 26. (France) Jacques Laffite
- Debut: 1985 Brazilian Grand Prix
- Last event: 1985 Australian Grand Prix
Races	Wins	Podiums	Poles	F/Laps
15	0	4	0	1
- Constructors' Championships: 0
- Drivers' Championships: 0

The Ligier JS25 was a Formula One car designed by Michel Beaujon and Claude Galopin for use by the Ligier team during the 1985 Formula One season. Like its predecessor, the JS23, the JS25 was powered by a turbocharged Renault V6 engine although the car ran on Pirelli instead of Michelin tyres after the French company pulled out of Grand Prix racing at the end of 1984. Drivers of the car were initially their 1984 driver Andrea de Cesaris and veteran Jacques Laffite who returned to the team after two fruitless years at Williams, but after a series of crashes, de Cesaris was fired by team boss Guy Ligier and replaced by Philippe Streiff.

Using the JS25, the French team were able to score 23 points in 1985 and finished 6th in the Constructors Championship. Laffite was able to score two 3rd-place finishes and also a 2nd place at the season ending Australian Grand Prix where teammate Streiff also managed to finish 3rd, although his efforts to take 2nd from Laffite almost cause both cars to not finish the race. Streiff made contact with Laffite on the penultimate lap of the race and drove the last with his left front wheel almost off the car.

Easily the most spectacular moment for the JS25 came at the Austrian Grand Prix when de Cesaris (aptly nicknamed "de Crasheris") destroyed his car in a high-speed rollover on lap 14. The team had not yet seen the accident on the television monitors when de Cesaris returned to the pits and he merely told them that the car had stalled and could not restart it, causing the team to be shocked when they finally saw the crash on replay. It was after this event that team owner Guy Ligier decided he could no longer afford the repair bills for de Cesaris's frequent crashes, stating "I can no longer afford to employ this man" (this was despite the Italian's personal sponsor Marlboro paying the bulk of his salary). He was replaced by Streiff after the next race in the Netherlands.

Ironically, Streiff was almost the cause of the team missing out on what would prove to be their best result of the season. In the final race of the season in Australia, Laffite and Streiff were headed for a safe 2nd and 3rd respectively behind race winner Keke Rosberg's Williams-Honda. On the penultimate lap, Streiff tried to overtake his team-mate for second place with almost disastrous results as the two cars collided. As a result, Streiff's front wheel axle was severely damaged. While Laffite carried on in second, Streiff managed to limp his JS25 home and retain third place despite only have three wheels firmly attached to the car, with the front left wheel bouncing up and down over the course of the last lap, but somehow remaining attached to the car. It would remain a career best finish for Streiff. Guy Ligier, not impressed that Streiff had almost taken out both team cars at the end of the race when they were both assured of a podium finish, would not offer the Frenchman a drive for 1986 as a result.

The JS25 was replaced for the 1986 season by the Ligier JS27.

== Complete Formula One World Championship results ==
(key) (results in italics indicate fastest lap)

Year	Entrant	Engine	Tyres	Driver	1	2	3	4	5	6	7	8	9	10	11	12	13	14	15	16	Pts.	WCC
1985	Équipe Ligier Gitanes	Renault Gordini EF4B; V6 tc	G		BRA	POR	SMR	MON	CAN	DET	FRA	GBR	GER	AUT	NED	ITA	BEL	EUR	RSA	AUS	23	6th
1985	Équipe Ligier Gitanes	Renault Gordini EF4B; V6 tc	G	Andrea de Cesaris	Ret	Ret	Ret	4	14	10	Ret	Ret	Ret	Ret	Ret						23	6th
1985	Équipe Ligier Gitanes	Renault Gordini EF4B; V6 tc	G	Philippe Streiff												10	9	8		3	23	6th
1985	Équipe Ligier Gitanes	Renault Gordini EF4B; V6 tc	G	Jacques Laffite	6	Ret	Ret	6	8	12	Ret	3	3	Ret	Ret	Ret	11	Ret		2	23	6th

- Équipe Ligier boycotted the 1985 South African Grand Prix due to mounting international pressures against tolerating the country's system of apartheid. Ligier's boycott was in lockstep with the French government's boycott and sanctioning of South Africa
