= 1984 San Marino Grand Prix =

- Race 4 of 16 in the 1984 Formula One World Championship
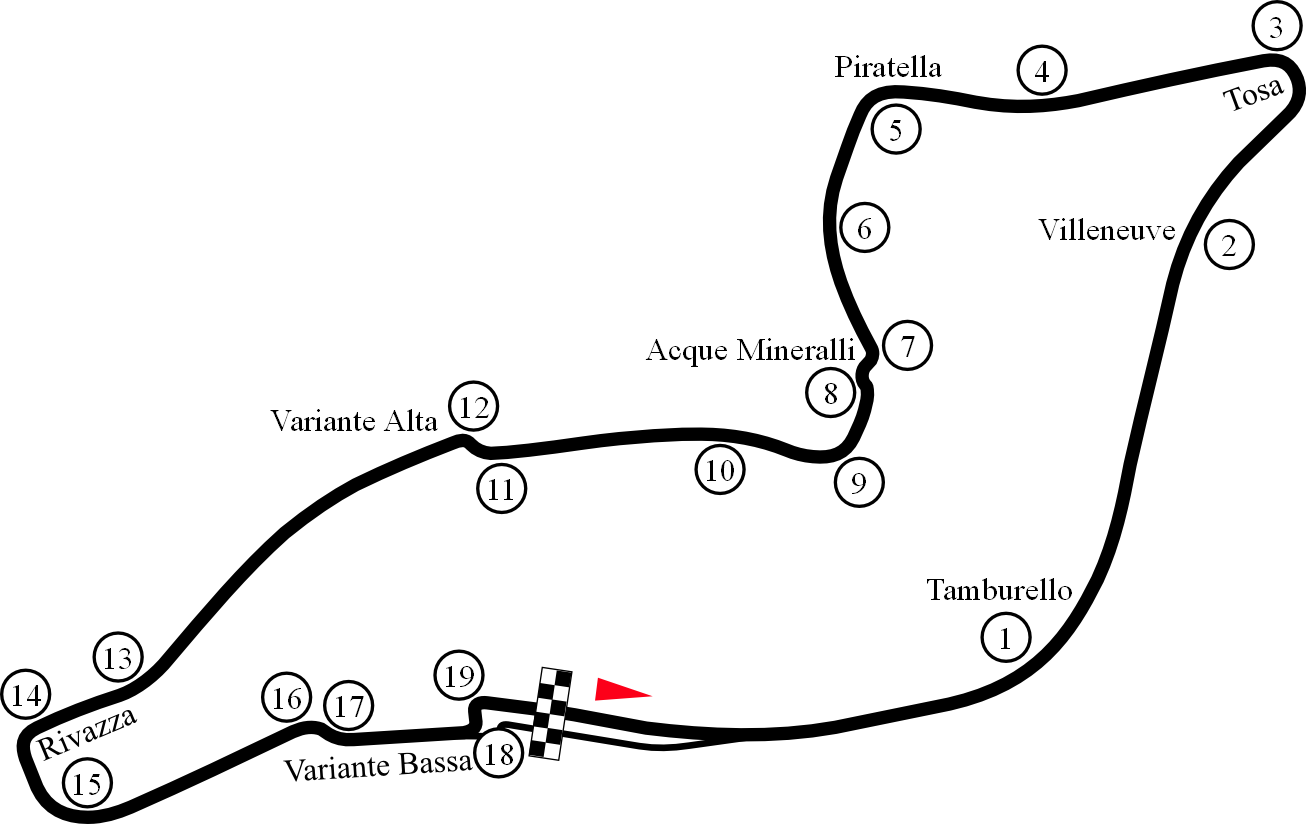

Race details
- Date: 6 May 1984
- Official name: 4^{o} Gran Premio di San Marino
- Location: Autodromo Dino Ferrari; Imola, Emilia-Romagna, Italy
- Course: Permanent racing facility
- Course length: 5.040 km (3.132 miles)
- Distance: 60 laps, 302.400 km (187.902 miles)

Pole position
Driver	(Brazil) Nelson Piquet	Brabham-BMW
- Time: 1:28.517

Fastest lap
Driver	(Brazil) Nelson Piquet	Brabham-BMW
- Time: 1:33.275 on lap 48

Podium
First	(France) Alain Prost	McLaren-TAG
Second	(France) René Arnoux	Ferrari
Third	(Italy) Elio de Angelis	Lotus-Renault

The 1984 San Marino Grand Prix was a Formula One motor race held at Imola on 6 May 1984. It was the fourth race of the 1984 Formula One World Championship.

== Report ==
=== Pre-race ===
A dispute between the Toleman team and tyre suppliers Pirelli lead to Ayrton Senna missing out on Friday practice running for his first Grand Prix around Imola. On Saturday his Hart 415T engine developed a misfire leading to Senna failing to qualify, the only time this would happen in the Brazilian's F1 career.

=== Race ===
The 60-lap race was won by Alain Prost, driving a McLaren-TAG. René Arnoux finished second in a Ferrari, while Elio de Angelis was third in a Lotus-Renault, despite running out of fuel on the last lap, and Derek Warwick finished fourth unable to unlap himself in the last lap largely because he was running dangerously low on fuel also and as such, followed Prost across the line so as not to have to do another lap (if he managed he would have completed more laps than de Angelis, promoting him onto the podium). Stefan Bellof finished fifth but was disqualified at the end of the season, so Thierry Boutsen (Arrows-Ford) and Andrea de Cesaris (Ligier-Renault) rounded out the points finishers, despite the de Cesaris running out of fuel in the last lap.

Andrea de Cesaris running out of fuel was the third time in 1984 that a Renault had run out of fuel as the factory Renault of Patrick Tambay had also run out of fuel in the first two races of the season in Brazil and South Africa. It had become fairly obvious over the first four races that 220 litres of fuel was not enough for the Renault turbo to finish the races at a winning pace, especially compared to the Porsche built TAG turbo being used by McLaren's. After the race Warwick said "This isn't motor racing, its a bloody joke. How am I supposed to race when I know I'm going to run out of fuel?" The Englishman's big problem in the closing laps was that having to continually turn the boost down and cut his revs as he was in the negative on his fuel readout had caused his engine to misfire leaving him no choice but to follow Prost home and forget about trying to catch the Lotus of de Angelis.

The race was not as straight forward for Prost as it seemed. During the race he was having a problem with his carbon brakes overheating, so much so that at one point mid-race it caused his McLaren to spin through the infield as he braked for Rivazza. The spin resolved the issue of whether or not the Frenchman would come in for tyres as it was now necessary as he had flat spotted his soft Michelin 010's in the spin. However, the stop was a quick one and he retained a 20 second lead.

== Classification ==
=== Qualifying ===
Pos	No	Driver	Constructor	Q1	Q2	Gap
1	1	(Brazil) Nelson Piquet	Brabham-BMW	1:35.493	1:28.517	
2	7	(France) Alain Prost	McLaren-TAG	1:35.687	1:28.628	+0.111
3	6	(Finland) Keke Rosberg	Williams-Honda	1:37.024	1:29.418	+0.901
4	16	(United Kingdom) Derek Warwick	Renault	1:36.706	1:29.682	+1.165
5	8	(Austria) Niki Lauda	McLaren-TAG	1:38.021	1:30.325	+1.808
6	28	(France) René Arnoux	Ferrari	1:38.389	1:30.411	+1.894
7	14	(West Germany) Manfred Winkelhock	ATS-BMW	1:47.362	1:30.723	+2.206
8	23	(United States) Eddie Cheever	Alfa Romeo	1:42.731	1:30.843	+2.326
9	2	(Italy) Teo Fabi	Brabham-BMW	1:37.594	1:30.950	+2.433
10	22	(Italy) Riccardo Patrese	Alfa Romeo	1:41.363	1:31.163	+2.646
11	11	(Italy) Elio de Angelis	Lotus-Renault	1:38.423	1:31.173	+2.656
12	26	(Italy) Andrea de Cesaris	Ligier-Renault	1:36.613	1:31.256	+2.739
13	27	(Italy) Michele Alboreto	Ferrari	1:47.919	1:31.282	+2.765
14	15	(France) Patrick Tambay	Renault	1:36.250	1:31.633	+3.146
15	5	(France) Jacques Laffite	Williams-Honda	1:41.891	1:32.600	+4.083
16	17	(Switzerland) Marc Surer	Arrows-BMW	1:42.046	1:33.063	+4.546
17	25	(France) François Hesnault	Ligier-Renault	1:40.356	1:33.186	+4.669
18	12	(United Kingdom) Nigel Mansell	Lotus-Renault	1:38.363	1:34.477	+5.960
19	20	(Venezuela) Johnny Cecotto	Toleman-Hart	no time	1:35.568	+7.051
20	18	(Belgium) Thierry Boutsen	Arrows-Ford	1:40.920	1:36.018	+7.501
21	4	(West Germany) Stefan Bellof	Tyrrell-Ford	1:39.765	1:36.059	+7.542
22	3	(United Kingdom) Martin Brundle	Tyrrell-Ford	1:41.123	1:36.531	+8.014
23	9	(France) Philippe Alliot	RAM-Hart	1:43.132	1:36.733	+8.216
24	21	(Italy) Mauro Baldi	Spirit-Hart	1:42.249	1:36.916	+8.399
25	10	(United Kingdom) Jonathan Palmer	RAM-Hart	1:53.014	1:37.262	+8.745
26	30	(Austria) Jo Gartner	Osella-Alfa Romeo	1:50.979	1:38.948	+10.431
27	24	(Italy) Piercarlo Ghinzani	Osella-Alfa Romeo	1:40.790	2:05.421	+12.273
28	19	(Brazil) Ayrton Senna	Toleman-Hart	no time	1:41.585	+13.068

=== Race ===
Pos	No	Driver	Constructor	Laps	Time/Retired	Grid	Points
1	7	(France) Alain Prost	McLaren-TAG	60	1:36:53.679	2	9
2	28	(France) René Arnoux	Ferrari	60	+ 13.416	6	6
3	11	(Italy) Elio de Angelis	Lotus-Renault	59	Out of Fuel	11	4
4	16	(United Kingdom) Derek Warwick	Renault	59	+ 1 Lap	4	3
5	18	(Belgium) Thierry Boutsen	Arrows-Ford	59	+ 1 Lap	20	2
6	26	(Italy) Andrea de Cesaris	Ligier-Renault	58	Out of Fuel	12	1
7	23	(United States) Eddie Cheever	Alfa Romeo	58	Out of Fuel	8	
8	21	(Italy) Mauro Baldi	Spirit-Hart	58	+ 2 Laps	24	
9	10	(United Kingdom) Jonathan Palmer	RAM-Hart	57	+ 3 Laps	25	
DSQ	4	(West Germany) Stefan Bellof	Tyrrell-Ford	59	Disqualified	21	
DSQ	3	(United Kingdom) Martin Brundle	Tyrrell-Ford	55	Disqualified	22	
Ret	9	(France) Philippe Alliot	RAM-Hart	53	Turbo	23	
NC	20	(Venezuela) Johnny Cecotto	Toleman-Hart	52	+ 8 Laps	19	
Ret	1	(Brazil) Nelson Piquet	Brabham-BMW	48	Turbo	1	
Ret	2	(Italy) Teo Fabi	Brabham-BMW	48	Turbo	9	
Ret	30	(Austria) Jo Gartner	Osella-Alfa Romeo	46	Engine	26	
Ret	17	(Switzerland) Marc Surer	Arrows-BMW	40	Turbo	16	
Ret	14	(West Germany) Manfred Winkelhock	ATS-BMW	31	Turbo	7	
Ret	27	(Italy) Michele Alboreto	Ferrari	23	Exhaust	13	
Ret	8	(Austria) Niki Lauda	McLaren-TAG	15	Engine	5	
Ret	5	(France) Jacques Laffite	Williams-Honda	11	Engine	15	
Ret	22	(Italy) Riccardo Patrese	Alfa Romeo	6	Electrical	10	
Ret	12	(United Kingdom) Nigel Mansell	Lotus-Renault	2	Spun Off	18	
Ret	6	(Finland) Keke Rosberg	Williams-Honda	2	Electrical	3	
Ret	15	(France) Patrick Tambay	Renault	0	Collision	14	
Ret	25	(France) François Hesnault	Ligier-Renault	0	Collision	17	
DNQ	24	(Italy) Piercarlo Ghinzani	Osella-Alfa Romeo				
DNQ	19	(Brazil) Ayrton Senna	Toleman-Hart				

== Championship standings after the race ==
Drivers' Championship standings

Pos	Driver	Points
1	(France) Alain Prost	24
2	(United Kingdom) Derek Warwick	13
3	(France) René Arnoux	10
4	(Italy) Elio de Angelis	10
5	(Italy) Michele Alboreto	9

Constructors' Championship standings

Pos	Constructor	Points
1	(United Kingdom) McLaren-TAG	33
2	(Italy) Ferrari	19
3	(France) Renault	14
4	(United Kingdom) Lotus-Renault	10
5	(United Kingdom) Williams-Honda	9

- Note: Only the top five positions are included for both sets of standings. Points accurate at final declaration of results. Tyrrell and its drivers were subsequently disqualified and their points reallocated.

Previous race: 1984 Belgian Grand Prix	FIA Formula One World Championship; 1984 season	Next race: 1984 French Grand Prix
Previous race: 1983 San Marino Grand Prix	San Marino Grand Prix	Next race: 1985 San Marino Grand Prix
