= Ligier JS27 =

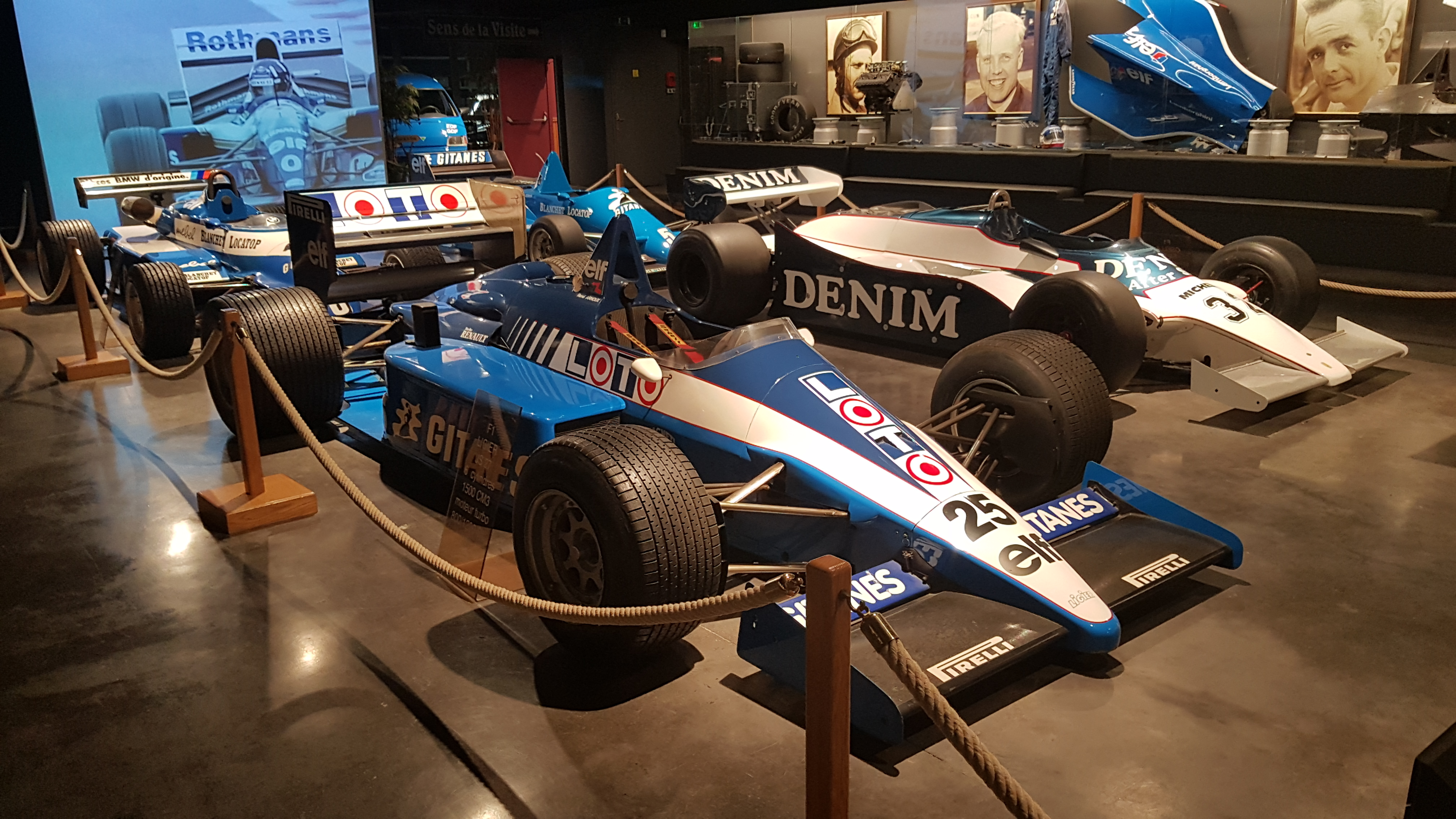
- Category: Formula One
- Constructor: Ligier
- Designers: Michel Têtu (Technical Director); Claude Galopin (Chief Designer); Michel Beaujon (Head of Design); Henri Durand (Head of Aerodynamics)
- Predecessor: JS25
- Successor: JS29

Technical specifications
- Chassis: Carbon fibre and Kevlar Monocoque
- Suspension (front): Double wishbones, pushrods
- Suspension (rear): Double wishbones, pushrods
- Axle track: Front: 1,790 mm (70 in); Rear: 1,662 mm (65.4 in)
- Wheelbase: 2,835 mm (111.6 in)
- Engine: Renault Gordini EF15, 1,492 cc (91.0 cu in), 90° V6, turbo, mid-engine, longitudinally mounted
- Transmission: Ligier / Hewland 5-speed manual
- Weight: 545 kg (1,202 lb)
- Fuel: Elf
- Tyres: Pirelli

Competition history
- Notable entrants: Équipe Ligier
- Notable drivers: 25. (France) René Arnoux; 26. (France) Jacques Laffite; 26. (France) Philippe Alliot
- Debut: 1986 Brazilian Grand Prix
- Last event: 1986 Australian Grand Prix
Races	Wins	Poles	F/Laps
16	0	0	0
- Constructors' Championships: 0
- Drivers' Championships: 0

The Ligier JS27 was the Formula One car used by French team Ligier to compete in the 1986 season.

== Description ==
The JS27 was a development of the previous year's JS25, with a lower fuel tank and revised aerodynamics to take advantage of the fuel limit which had been reduced from 220 to 195 litres. It was also lighter than its overweight predecessor, with the customer supply of Renault engines more effectively integrated into the overall package than before, although the specification of the engines was always slightly behind fellow-Renault users Lotus and was not developed through the course of the season.

Three JS27 chassis were built and ready to race for the first round of the championship in Brazil, and a further two were constructed during the course of the season: chassis 04 was introduced for the Belgian Grand Prix, whilst chassis 05 was ready in time for the race in Canada. Chassis 01 was written off due to the extensive front-end damage caused by Jacques Laffite's career-ending accident at the British Grand Prix.

== Racing history ==
The JS27 was initially driven by the French pairing of Ligier mainstay Laffite and René Arnoux. The latter had missed all but the first race of the 1985 season after being sacked after the Brazilian Grand Prix by Ferrari (neither Ferrari nor Arnoux have ever gone public with the reason for his sacking); at 42 years old, Laffite was the oldest driver on the grid.

The JS27 scored numerous points finishes in the first half of the season, including two podium finishes from Laffite. At Detroit, Laffite led the race and eventually finishing second, whilst Arnoux was on course for second place until he crashed. By the time of the British Grand Prix, Ligier were fourth in the Constructors' Championship, behind Williams, McLaren and Lotus, but ahead of Ferrari. This race, however, saw Laffite caught up in a first-lap pile-up, seriously injuring his legs. The crash effectively ended his Formula One career, as he chose not to return once his injuries had healed.

Due to Laffite's accident and a concurrent lack of development on the chassis, the JS27 was less competitive in the second half of the season. Arnoux and substitute driver Philippe Alliot could only score four points from the German Grand Prix onwards, but this was enough to secure fifth in the Constructors' Championship - the highest-placed team using Pirelli tyres.

After the JS27, the team would suffer a competitive slump that would last until the 1993 season. The JS27 was also the last Ligier chassis to lead a lap of a Grand Prix until Olivier Panis' victory in the 1996 Monaco Grand Prix, Ligier's last season in F1 before its takeover by Alain Prost.

== Complete Formula One World Championship results ==
(key) (results in bold indicate pole position)

Year	Team	Engine(s)	Tyres	Drivers	1	2	3	4	5	6	7	8	9	10	11	12	13	14	15	16	Points	WCC
1986	Équipe Ligier	Renault Gordini EF15; V6 tc	**P**		BRA	ESP	SMR	MON	BEL	CAN	DET	FRA	GBR	GER	HUN	AUT	ITA	POR	MEX	AUS	**29**	**5th**
1986	Équipe Ligier	Renault Gordini EF15; V6 tc	**P**	(France) René Arnoux	4	Ret	Ret	5	Ret	6	Ret	5	4	4	Ret	10	Ret	7	15†	7	**29**	**5th**
1986	Équipe Ligier	Renault Gordini EF15; V6 tc	**P**	(France) Jacques Laffite	3	Ret	Ret	6	5	7	2	6	Ret								**29**	**5th**
1986	Équipe Ligier	Renault Gordini EF15; V6 tc	**P**	(France) Philippe Alliot										Ret	9	Ret	Ret	Ret	6	8	**29**	**5th**

== Sources ==
- Hamilton, Maurice, ed. (1986). AUTOCOURSE 1986-87. Hazleton Publishing. ISBN 0-905138-44-9.
- Ménard, Pierre, ed. (2006). The Great Encyclopedia of Formula 1. Chronosports S.A. ISBN 2-84707-123-7.
- Spurring, Quentin (2005). Formula 1 in Camera 1980-89. Haynes Publishing. ISBN 1-84425-109-8.
