= Ligier JS21 =

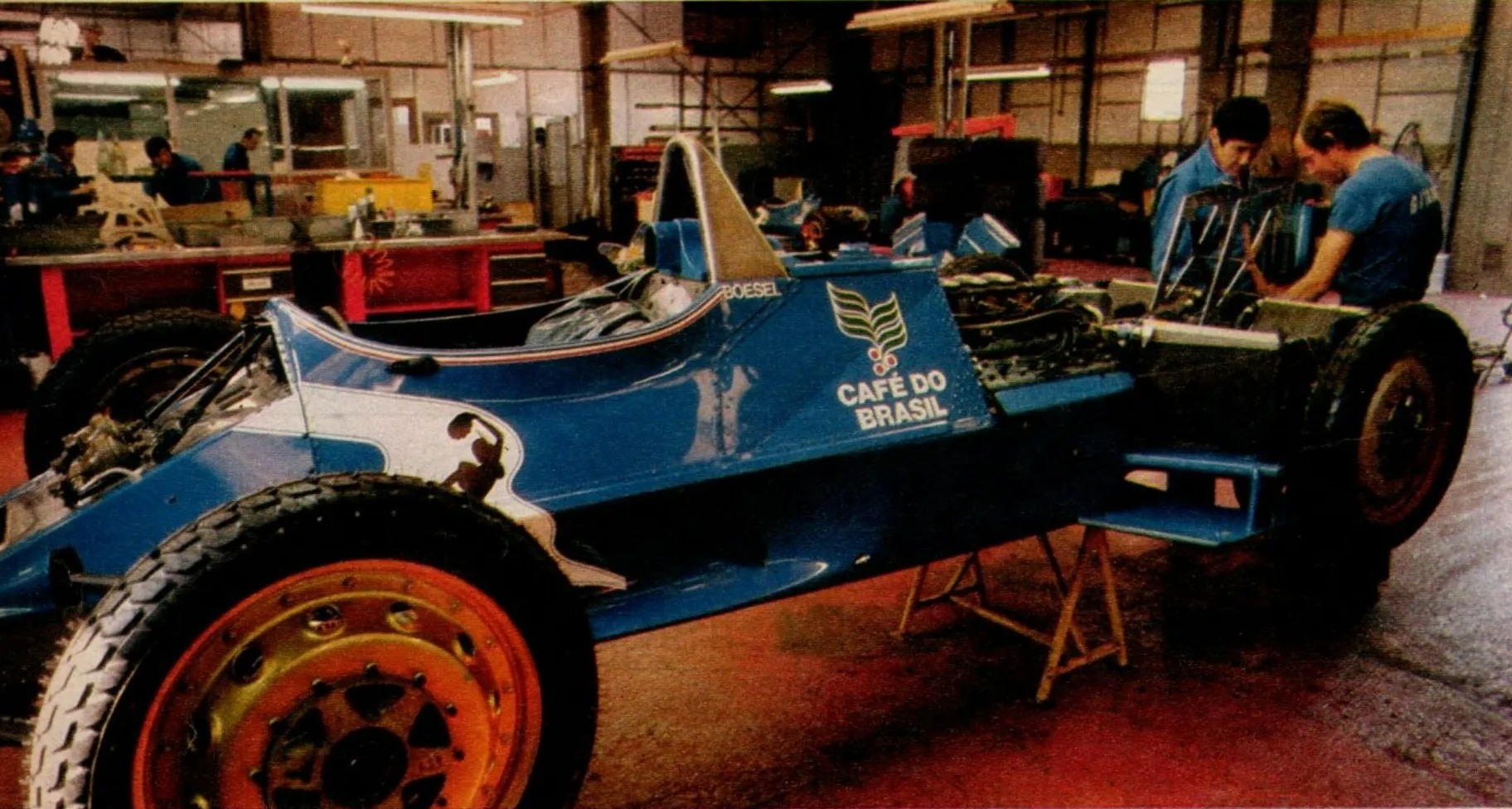
- Category: Formula One
- Constructor: Ligier
- Designers: Michel Beaujon (Technical Director); Claude Galopin (Chief Designer); Henri Durand (Head of Aerodynamics)
- Predecessor: JS19
- Successor: JS23

Technical specifications
- Chassis: Aluminium monocoque
- Axle track: Front: 1,625 mm (64.0 in); Rear: 1,515 mm (59.6 in)
- Wheelbase: 2,800 mm (110 in)
- Engine: Ford Cosworth DFV 3.0, 2,993 cc (182.6 cu in), 90° V8, NA, mid-engine, longitudinally mounted
- Transmission: Hewland FGB, 5-speed manual
- Weight: 540 kg (1,190 lb)
- Fuel: Elf
- Tyres: Michelin

Competition history
- Notable entrants: Ligier Gitanes
- Notable drivers: (France) Jean-Pierre Jarier (Brazil) Raul Boesel
- Debut: 1983 Brazilian Grand Prix
- Last event: 1983 South African Grand Prix
Races	Wins	Poles	F/Laps
15	0	0	0
- Constructors' Championships: 0
- Drivers' Championships: 0

The Ligier JS21 was a Formula One racing car manufactured and raced by Ligier during the 1983 Formula One season. Powered by a Cosworth V8 engine while the majority of teams used turbo power, the team failed to score any points.

== Development ==
The JS21 was designed by Claude Galopin under the technical direction of Michel Beaujon. Henri Durand worked on the car's aerodynamics. Having used Talbot engines for the previous two seasons, the JS21 was designed to be powered by a Ford Cosworth DFV. Ligier was the first choice to be the recipient of the then-new Honda turbo engine due to team owner Guy Ligier's longstanding relationship with Honda but the team declined to use it. The first three JS21 chassis were converted from the previous year's JS19, with four in total being built.

== Racing history ==
The Ligier team recruited two new drivers for the 1983 season, Jean-Pierre Jarier, who had a single outing for the team back in 1977, and Brazilian novice Raul Boesel. Jarier qualified for every race with a best grid placing of 9th, at the Monaco Grand Prix. His best finish was 7th in Austria. For most of the season, Boesel usually qualified several places behind Jarier but improved towards the season's end although he did miss qualifying for the Austrian and Italian races. His best qualifying was 17th, in the season opening Brazilian Grand Prix, and he achieved his best finish of 7th the following race in the United States.

1983 was the first season in the team's history that it failed to score a single point. For the following year, team owner Guy Ligier secured the use of Renault V6 turbocharged engines.

== Complete Formula One World Championship results ==
(key) (Results in bold indicate pole position; results in italics indicate fastest lap)

Year	Team	Engine	Tyres	Drivers	1	2	3	4	5	6	7	8	9	10	11	12	13	14	15	Points	WCC
1983	Equipe Ligier Gitanes	Ford Cosworth DFV 3.0 V8	**MI**		BRA	USW	FRA	SMR	MON	BEL	DET	CAN	GBR	GER	AUT	NED	ITA	EUR	RSA	**0**	**NC**
1983	Equipe Ligier Gitanes	Ford Cosworth DFV 3.0 V8	**MI**	Jean-Pierre Jarier	Ret	Ret	9	Ret	Ret	Ret	Ret	Ret	10	8	7	Ret	9	Ret	10	**0**	**NC**
1983	Equipe Ligier Gitanes	Ford Cosworth DFV 3.0 V8	**MI**	Raul Boesel	Ret	7	Ret	9	Ret	13	10	Ret	Ret	Ret	DNQ	10	DNQ	15	NC	**0**	**NC**
