= DAMS GD-01 =

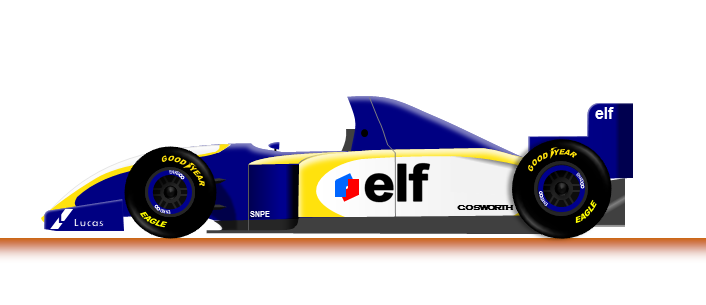
- Category: Formula One
- Constructor: DAMS
- Designers: Rob Arnott; Claude Galopin

Technical specifications
- Chassis: Carbon fibre monocoque
- Suspension (front): Wishbone/pushrod-actuated
- Suspension (rear): As front
- Engine: Ford Cosworth ED 3.0 litres (180 in^{3}) V8 normally aspirated mid-mounted
- Transmission: Xtrac/DAMS 6-speed sequential semi-automatic
- Weight: 595 kilograms (1,312 lb)
- Fuel: Elf
- Tyres: Goodyear

Competition history
- Notable entrants: DAMS
- Notable drivers: (France) Emmanuel Collard (France) Érik Comas (Netherlands) Jan Lammers
- Debut: Test car only
Races	Wins	Poles	F/Laps
0	0	0	0
- Constructors' Championships: 0
- Drivers' Championships: 0

The DAMS GD-01 was an unraced Formula One car used by the French motorsport team, Driot-Arnoux Motor Sport (DAMS). The GD-01 was designed and built by a collaboration of DAMS and Reynard engineers from 1994 to 1995, and was intended to establish the team—which had achieved considerable success in lower categories—in Formula One (F1), the premier Fédération Internationale de l'Automobile (FIA)-sanctioned level of racing. However, due to insufficient financial backing, the team never entered the championship, despite completing construction of the chassis and conducting limited testing.

== Concept ==
DAMS was founded by Jean-Paul Driot and F1 driver René Arnoux in 1988, and was based in Le Mans. The team quickly became a competitive force in International Formula 3000, the level of motorsport immediately below F1, winning the 1990, 1993 and 1994 drivers' championships with Érik Comas, Olivier Panis and Jean-Christophe Boullion respectively. Driot aimed to take the next step in the team's progression by moving up to F1, thus emulating the examples of the Jordan, Pacific and Forti teams, all successful Formula 3000 teams which graduated to F1 in the first half of the 1990s.

In order to design and build a competitive F1 car, DAMS established a partnership with British constructor Reynard, an experienced constructor of racing cars for junior formulae and the American racing scene. The company had also provided data which assisted with the construction of the Benetton B192 and Ligier JS37 F1 cars, and had also built its own chassis, which ultimately became the Pacific PR01 after Reynard's plan to operate its own team fell through. DAMS set up an office near Reynard's headquarters, and assigned former Ligier designer Claude Galopin and Reynard employee Rob Arnott to lead the chassis design team.

== Construction ==
Construction of the GD-01 began in 1994, but progress was slow due to limited financial backing. Sponsorship proved hard to find due to the presence of two existing French teams in the sport—Ligier and Larrousse—and the Le Mans region's focus on its 24-hour race. In addition, changes to the sport's technical regulations—as a result of the deaths of Roland Ratzenberger and Ayrton Senna at the 1994 San Marino Grand Prix—further hindered progress. By the beginning of the 1995 season, nevertheless, the GD-01 was nearly complete. This led Gérard Larrousse, whose eponymous F1 team was struggling to survive due to restrictions on alcohol and tobacco sponsorship caused by the Evin Law, to enter into negotiations with Driot over the possibility of Larrousse running the GD-01 instead of its planned Larrousse LH95 chassis—which it could not afford to build—or an updated LH94, which would be extremely uncompetitive due to modifications needed to comply with the rules. Driot refused to allow his chassis to be raced by another team unless he could have greater involvement; Larrousse eventually folded without contesting a single 1995 race.

The chassis featured a triple bulkhead monocoque made of a composite of carbon fibre and aluminium honeycomb, which was manufactured by the Lille-based SNPE company. The bodywork was quite bulky, as the sidepods housed large water and oil coolers. The GD-01 had a conventional suspension, featuring wishbones with pushrod-actuated shock absorbers. The car featured a low-nose configuration, which was gradually being abandoned in favour of higher noses by other F1 teams at the time, although the Reynard engineers had tested both configurations. The car's overall aerodynamic package has been described by motorsport author Sam Collins as "underdeveloped". The GD-01 was powered by a Ford Cosworth ED V8 engine—a new unit for the three-litre era of F1 that began in 1995—which was a standard contemporary choice for smaller teams due to its low cost and ease of installation. The engine had a mileage of 400 miles (640 km) before rebuilds, a weight of 129.5 kilograms (285 lb), a rev limit of 13,500 rpm, and maximum power of 610 brake horsepower (450 kW) at 13,200 rpm. It was initially thought that the chassis would be powered by a Mugen-Honda engine as part of a low-key return to F1 for Honda, but negotiations between the parties came to nought. The car's transmission was a six-speed sequential unit built specially for the team by British company Xtrac, which also supplied the team's differential. Xtrac gearboxes were also used in the Minardi M195 and Simtek S951 chassis in 1995. The car's electronics were supplied by Pi Research, its Goodyear-supplied tyres fitted on Enkei wheels, and it was fuelled with Elf petrol. Only one chassis was built.

== Launch and testing history ==
DAMS unveiled the GD-01 on the starting grid of the Circuit de la Sarthe in the late summer of 1995. The launch was attended by Driot, Galopin and Arnott, in addition to drivers Érik Comas, Emmanuel Collard and Jan Lammers. The car was presented in a blue, white and yellow scheme with minimal sponsorship; the stickers present on the car were from technical partners such as Elf. By this time, it was already obsolete as the monocoque did not fully comply with the 1995 regulations, but the team's engineers were confident that it could be modified in order to do so.

The GD-01 was tested by Comas and Lammers at the Circuit Paul Ricard in the south of France in October. It proved to be off the pace due to its cautious bodywork and aerodynamic design, indicating that it would need a thorough development programme in order for it to compete effectively in F1, particularly with the introduction of the 107% rule—which prevented drivers who were too slow in relation to the pole position time from qualifying—for the 1996 season. However, the team's struggle to acquire a sufficient budget to race meant that Driot missed the deadline to apply for the 1996 championship. He hoped to apply for the 1997 season, but the continuing struggle to find financial backing, the increasing obsolescence of the GD-01's design, and the failure of the Simtek, Pacific and Forti teams to maintain an F1 team using the Cosworth ED engine, eventually persuaded him to abandon the venture altogether.

== Legacy ==
Throughout the development, construction and testing of the GD-01, DAMS maintained its International Formula 3000 team, which survives to this day in FIA Formula 2 Championship. The sole GD-01 chassis is in the team's factory, whilst the car's design drawings and documentation are in the possession of Adrian Reynard. The car's Xtrac transmission was subsequently used in the Dome F105, another F1 test project which was never entered in a Grand Prix. Reynard continued to expand its operations, designing the British American Racing team's first F1 cars from 1999 onwards, and moving into other series such as Champ Car, before filing for bankruptcy in 2002.
