= 1986 British Grand Prix =

Ninth race of the 1986 Formula One World Championship

- Race 9 of 16 in the 1986 Formula One World Championship

Race details
- Date: 13 July 1986
- Official name: XXXIX Shell Oils British Grand Prix
- Location: Brands Hatch, Kent, Great Britain
- Course: Permanent racing facility
- Course length: 4.206 or 4.207 km (2.613 or 2.614 miles)
- Distance: 75 laps, 315.5 or 315.458 or 315.525 km (196.0 or 196.017 or 196.058 miles)
- Weather: Sunny

Pole position
| Driver | (Brazil) Nelson Piquet | Williams-Honda |
- Time: 1:06.961

Fastest lap
| Driver | (United Kingdom) Nigel Mansell | Williams-Honda |
- Time: 1:09.593 on lap 69

Podium
| First | (United Kingdom) Nigel Mansell | Williams-Honda |
| Second | (Brazil) Nelson Piquet | Williams-Honda |
| Third | (France) Alain Prost | McLaren-TAG |

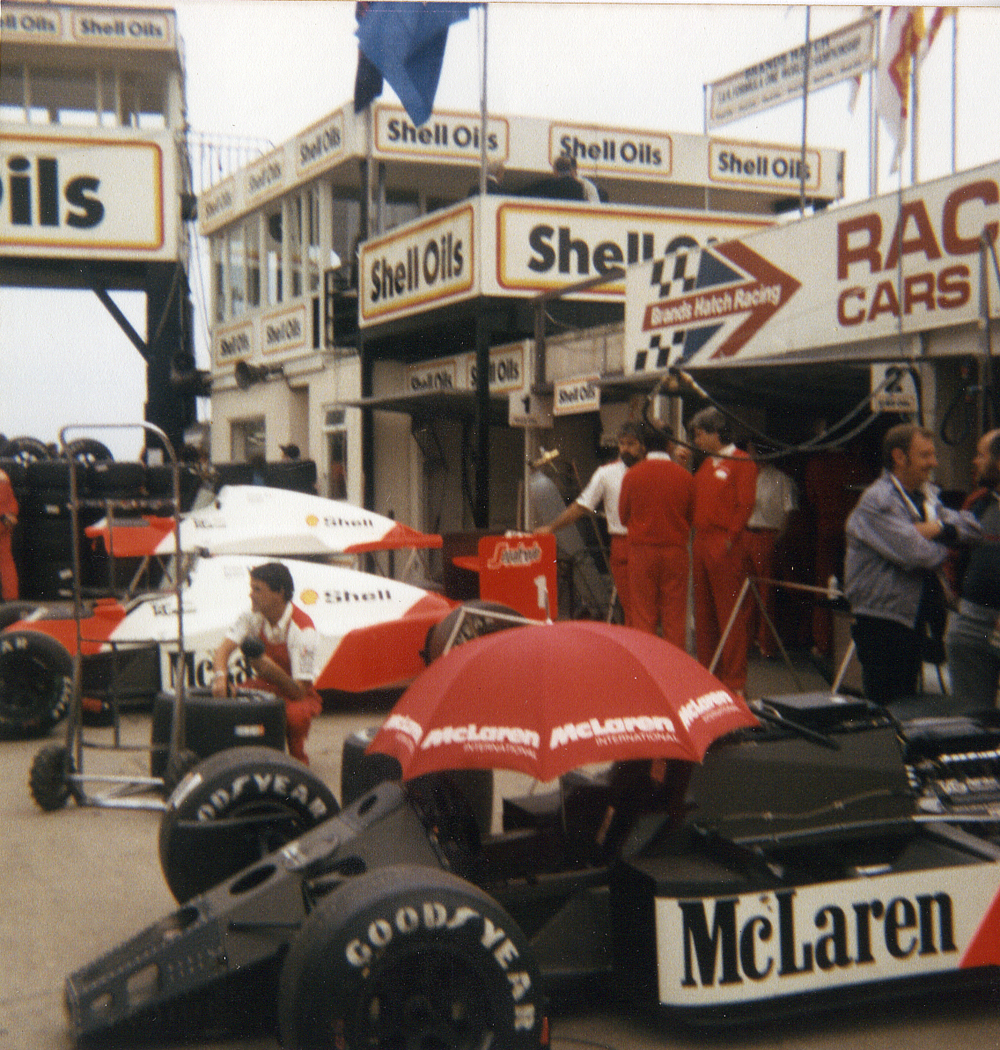
McLaren pits

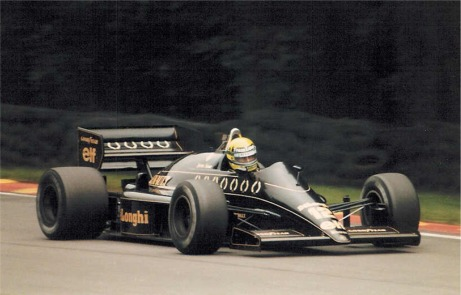
Ayrton Senna in a Lotus 98T

The 1986 British Grand Prix (formally the XXXIX Shell Oils British Grand Prix) was a Formula One motor race held at Brands Hatch in Kent, England on 13 July 1986. It was the ninth race of the 1986 FIA Formula One World Championship.

== Background ==
The race also saw the return to the paddock of Frank Williams for the first time since he was paralysed in a road accident in France four months earlier.

This was the last British Grand Prix and also the last Formula One race to be held at Brands Hatch. The international motorsports governing body at the time, FISA, had instituted a policy of long-term contracts with circuits, and Brands Hatch was perceived as a poorer facility to Silverstone, with much less room for the mechanics to work, besides the track being more dangerous for the drivers. In May 1986, Silverstone and its owner, the British Racing Drivers' Club (BRDC), signed a long-term contract with FISA; the British Grand Prix has been held at the Northamptonshire circuit since 1987. The first time since the 1986 British Grand Prix that major single-seater racing returned to Brands Hatch was the London Champ Car Trophy for CART in 2003.

=== Race ===
French driver Jacques Laffite broke both legs during a multi-car pile-up at the start, resulting in the end of his Formula One career (which he intended to end after the Australian Grand Prix). Laffite, driving a Ligier-Renault, was assisted by Zakspeed driver Jonathan Palmer, a qualified general practitioner before taking up motor racing in the late 1970s. Laffite was making his 176th Formula One start, equalling Graham Hill's record. The pile-up caused the race to be stopped; it was restarted 50 minutes later, after Laffite had been airlifted to Queen Mary's Hospital in nearby Sidcup.

The race was eventually won by local driver Nigel Mansell, driving a Williams-Honda. Mansell won after a battle with Brazilian teammate Nelson Piquet, finishing 5.5 seconds ahead. Reigning World Champion, Frenchman Alain Prost, finished third in his McLaren-TAG, one lap adrift.

This was the first time a woman had stood on the Formula One podium to receive the Manufacturers' Award, and it was Virginia "Ginny" Williams, wife of Frank Williams and mother of Claire Williams.

== Classification ==
=== Qualifying ===
| Pos | No | Driver | Constructor | Q1 | Q2 | Gap |
|---|---|---|---|---|---|---|
| 1 | 6 | (Brazil) Nelson Piquet | Williams-Honda | 1:07.690 | 1:06.961 | |
| 2 | 5 | (United Kingdom) Nigel Mansell | Williams-Honda | 1:08.818 | 1:07.399 | +0.438 |
| 3 | 12 | (Brazil) Ayrton Senna | Lotus-Renault | 1:09.042 | 1:07.524 | +0.563 |
| 4 | 20 | (Austria) Gerhard Berger | Benetton-BMW | 1:09.916 | 1:08.196 | +1.235 |
| 5 | 2 | (Finland) Keke Rosberg | McLaren-TAG | 1:09.479 | 1:08.477 | +1.516 |
| 6 | 1 | (France) Alain Prost | McLaren-TAG | 1:09.779 | 1:09.334 | +2.373 |
| 7 | 19 | (Italy) Teo Fabi | Benetton-BMW | 1:11.819 | 1:09.409 | +2.448 |
| 8 | 25 | (France) René Arnoux | Ligier-Renault | 1:09.971 | 1:09.543 | +2.582 |
| 9 | 8 | (United Kingdom) Derek Warwick | Brabham-BMW | 1:12.403 | 1:10.209 | +3.248 |
| 10 | 11 | (United Kingdom) Johnny Dumfries | Lotus-Renault | 1:10.304 | 1:10.583 | +3.343 |
| 11 | 3 | (United Kingdom) Martin Brundle | Tyrrell-Renault | 1:11.432 | 1:10.334 | +3.373 |
| 12 | 27 | (Italy) Michele Alboreto | Ferrari | 1:11.662 | 1:10.338 | +3.377 |
| 13 | 18 | (Belgium) Thierry Boutsen | Arrows-BMW | 1:12.333 | 1:10.941 | +3.980 |
| 14 | 15 | (Australia) Alan Jones | Lola-Ford | 1:12.060 | 1:11.121 | +4.160 |
| 15 | 7 | (Italy) Riccardo Patrese | Brabham-BMW | 1:12.513 | 1:11.267 | +4.306 |
| 16 | 4 | (France) Philippe Streiff | Tyrrell-Renault | 1:11.682 | 1:11.450 | +4.489 |
| 17 | 16 | (France) Patrick Tambay | Lola-Ford | 1:13.376 | 1:11.458 | +4.497 |
| 18 | 28 | (Sweden) Stefan Johansson | Ferrari | 1:11.500 | 1:11.568 | +4.539 |
| 19 | 26 | (France) Jacques Laffite | Ligier-Renault | 1:12.715 | 1:12.281 | +5.320 |
| 20 | 24 | (Italy) Alessandro Nannini | Minardi-Motori Moderni | 1:12.848 | 1:13.496 | +5.887 |
| 21 | 23 | (Italy) Andrea de Cesaris | Minardi-Motori Moderni | 1:14.366 | 1:12.980 | +6.019 |
| 22 | 14 | (United Kingdom) Jonathan Palmer | Zakspeed | 1:14.678 | 1:13.009 | +6.048 |
| 23 | 17 | (West Germany) Christian Danner | Arrows-BMW | 1:13.261 | 1:13.421 | +6.300 |
| 24 | 21 | (Italy) Piercarlo Ghinzani | Osella-Alfa Romeo | 1:16.440 | 1:16.134 | +9.173 |
| 25 | 29 | (Netherlands) Huub Rothengatter | Zakspeed | | 1:16.854 | +9.917 |
| 26 | 22 | (Canada) Allen Berg | Osella-Alfa Romeo | 1:18.319 | | +11.738 |

=== Race ===
| Pos | No | Driver | Constructor | Tyre | Laps | Time/Retired | Grid | Points |
|---|---|---|---|---|---|---|---|---|
| 1 | 5 | (United Kingdom) Nigel Mansell | Williams-Honda | G | 75 | 1:30:38.471 | 2 | 9 |
| 2 | 6 | (Brazil) Nelson Piquet | Williams-Honda | G | 75 | + 5.574 | 1 | 6 |
| 3 | 1 | (France) Alain Prost | McLaren-TAG | G | 74 | + 1 lap | 6 | 4 |
| 4 | 25 | (France) René Arnoux | Ligier-Renault | P | 73 | + 2 laps | 8 | 3 |
| 5 | 3 | (United Kingdom) Martin Brundle | Tyrrell-Renault | G | 72 | + 3 laps | 11 | 2 |
| 6 | 4 | (France) Philippe Streiff | Tyrrell-Renault | G | 72 | + 3 laps | 16 | 1 |
| 7 | 11 | (United Kingdom) Johnny Dumfries | Lotus-Renault | G | 72 | + 3 laps | 10 | |
| 8 | 8 | (United Kingdom) Derek Warwick | Brabham-BMW | P | 72 | + 3 laps | 9 | |
| 9 | 14 | (United Kingdom) Jonathan Palmer | Zakspeed | G | 69 | + 6 laps | 22 | |
| NC | 18 | (Belgium) Thierry Boutsen | Arrows-BMW | G | 62 | + 13 laps | 13 | |
| Ret | 16 | (France) Patrick Tambay | Lola-Ford | G | 60 | Gearbox | 17 | |
| Ret | 27 | (Italy) Michele Alboreto | Ferrari | G | 51 | Turbo | 12 | |
| Ret | 24 | (Italy) Alessandro Nannini | Minardi-Motori Moderni | P | 50 | Steering | 20 | |
| Ret | 19 | (Italy) Teo Fabi | Benetton-BMW | P | 45 | Fuel system | 7 | |
| Ret | 7 | (Italy) Riccardo Patrese | Brabham-BMW | P | 39 | Engine | 15 | |
| Ret | 12 | (Brazil) Ayrton Senna | Lotus-Renault | G | 27 | Gearbox | 3 | |
| Ret | 29 | (Netherlands) Huub Rothengatter | Zakspeed | G | 24 | Engine | 25 | |
| Ret | 23 | (Italy) Andrea de Cesaris | Minardi-Motori Moderni | P | 23 | Electrical | 21 | |
| Ret | 20 | (Austria) Gerhard Berger | Benetton-BMW | P | 22 | Electrical | 4 | |
| Ret | 15 | (Australia) Alan Jones | Lola-Ford | G | 22 | Throttle | 14 | |
| Ret | 28 | (Sweden) Stefan Johansson | Ferrari | G | 20 | Engine | 18 | |
| Ret | 2 | (Finland) Keke Rosberg | McLaren-TAG | G | 7 | Gearbox | 5 | |
| Ret | 26 | (France) Jacques Laffite | Ligier-Renault | P | 0 | Collision | 19 | |
| Ret | 17 | (West Germany) Christian Danner | Arrows-BMW | G | 0 | Collision | 23 | |
| Ret | 21 | (Italy) Piercarlo Ghinzani | Osella-Alfa Romeo | P | 0 | Collision | 24 | |
| Ret | 22 | (Canada) Allen Berg | Osella-Alfa Romeo | P | 0 | Collision | 26 | |

== Championship standings after the race ==
Drivers' Championship standings

| Pos | Driver | Points |
|---|---|---|
| 1 | (United Kingdom) Nigel Mansell | 47 |
| 2 | (France) Alain Prost | 43 |
| 3 | (Brazil) Ayrton Senna | 36 |
| 4 | (Brazil) Nelson Piquet | 29 |
| 5 | (Finland) Keke Rosberg | 17 |

Constructors' Championship standings

| Pos | Constructor | Points |
|---|---|---|
| 1 | (United Kingdom) Williams-Honda | 76 |
| 2 | (United Kingdom) McLaren-TAG | 60 |
| 3 | (United Kingdom) Lotus-Renault | 36 |
| 4 | (France) Ligier-Renault | 25 |
| 5 | (Italy) Ferrari | 13 |

- Note: Only the top five positions are included for both sets of standings.

| Previous race: 1986 French Grand Prix | FIA Formula One World Championship; 1986 season | Next race: 1986 German Grand Prix |
| Previous race: 1985 British Grand Prix; Previous race at Brands Hatch: 1985 European Grand Prix | British Grand Prix | Next race: 1987 British Grand Prix |
