= 1985 Austrian Grand Prix =

- Race 10 of 16 in the 1985 Formula One World Championship
- The Österreichring (last modified in 1977)

Race details
- Date: 18 August 1985
- Official name: XXIII Holiday Großer Preis von Osterreich
- Location: Österreichring, Spielberg, Styria, Austria
- Course: Permanent racing facility
- Course length: 5.942 km (3.692 miles)
- Distance: 52 laps, 308.984 km (191.994 miles)
- Weather: Dry

Pole position
Driver	(France) Alain Prost	McLaren-TAG
- Time: 1:25.490

Fastest lap
Driver	(France) Alain Prost	McLaren-TAG
- Time: 1:29.241 on lap 39

Podium
First	(France) Alain Prost	McLaren-TAG
Second	(Brazil) Ayrton Senna	Lotus-Renault
Third	(Italy) Michele Alboreto	Ferrari

The 1985 Austrian Grand Prix was a Formula One motor race held at Österreichring on 18 August 1985. It was the tenth race of the 1985 Formula One World Championship. It was the 25th Austrian Grand Prix and the 24th to be held at Österreichring. The race was run over 52 laps of the 5.94-kilometre (3.69 mi) circuit for a total race distance of 308.9 kilometres (191.9 mi).

The race was won by Frenchman Alain Prost, driving a McLaren-TAG, after he started from pole position. Prost took his fourth victory of the season by 30 seconds from Brazilian Ayrton Senna in a Lotus-Renault, with Italian Michele Alboreto third in a Ferrari. With the win, Prost moved level on points with Alboreto at the top of the Drivers' Championship.

This was the last F1 race until the start of 1987 in which a car with a naturally aspirated engine was entered, Martin Brundle failing to qualify his Cosworth-powered Tyrrell.

== Race summary ==
Missing from the grid was RAM driver Manfred Winkelhock who had been killed in a sportscar race in Canada just a week before. His place was taken in the team by Kenny Acheson for his first Formula One race since the 1983 South African Grand Prix.

A second Toleman was driven by Piercarlo Ghinzani.

Before Saturday morning practice triple and defending World Champion (and 1984 Austrian Grand Prix winner) Niki Lauda, flanked by a very unhappy McLaren team boss Ron Dennis, announced to the media that he would be retiring for good from Formula One following the season ending Australian Grand Prix to concentrate on running his airline Lauda Air. Dennis was reportedly unhappy as he had paid Lauda a considerable amount of money to make his F1 comeback in 1982 and he had unsuccessfully tried to get Lauda to continue racing into the 1986 season.

A now relaxed Lauda gave his home fans something to cheer about when he qualified a season-high third. Lauda's teammate Alain Prost captured pole position, averaging 155.478 mph (250.219 km/h), followed by Nigel Mansell (Williams-Honda), Lauda, Keke Rosberg (Williams) and Nelson Piquet (Brabham-BMW). After a troubled qualifying, Ayrton Senna only qualified 14th on the grid in his Lotus-Renault.

The race was restarted after one lap (with Niki Lauda having made a great start from third on the grid to lead Prost as the race was stopped). Mansell had got away very slowly in his Williams, but behind him Teo Fabi in the Toleman-Hart barely moved. Elio de Angelis' Lotus dived left to avoid Fabi and was hit by the Ferrari of Michele Alboreto. Fabi suffered damage as did the Arrows-BMW of the second Austrian driver in the race Gerhard Berger. Luckily for those with damaged cars (especially championship leader Alboreto) the first lap was declared null and void and the race was completely restarted meaning those with damaged cars were permitted to start in the team spares. Lucky too was Prost who was able to change cars after his McLaren had developed a misfire. Piercarlo Ghinzani became a non-starter in his Toleman after teammate Fabi took over the spare TG185 for the race as he had qualified 6th while Ghinzani started 19th. This left Ghinzani without a drive.

On lap 13 Andrea de Cesaris survived one of the biggest and most spectacular crashes ever seen in Formula One when his Ligier-Renault went off-line at the left hand Panorama Curve and slid onto the outside grassy embankment at high speed. The grass, wet from overnight rain caused the Ligier to initially slide sideways before his right rear hit a slight bank launching the car into a series of 4 consecutive mid-air rolls and flips with de Cesaris's head bouncing around freely in the cockpit. Somehow as soon as the Ligier came to a rest, de Cesaris undid his seat belt and walked away with nothing more than a mud-splattered helmet and driving suit. When he returned to the pits, the Ligier team had not yet seen a replay of the accident, and de Cesaris told the team that the car had stalled and wouldn't restart. However, the crash was the end for de Cesaris at Ligier, with team owner Guy Ligier firing the Italian after he saw a replay of the crash stating "I can no longer afford to keep employing this man" referring to the constant repair bills from de Cesaris's crashes since he joined the team in 1984. de Cesaris was fired from Ligier after he raced for the team at the Dutch Grand Prix one week later.

With his 20th career victory, Prost moved into a shared lead in the World Drivers' Championship alongside Alboreto, with each having 50 points. After a string of non-finishes since his win in the second race of the season in Portugal, Senna drove a great race into second from a lowly (for him) 14th on the grid, with Alboreto finishing third in the spare Ferrari to retain his lead in the World Championship (now shared with Prost). Stefan Johansson (Ferrari), Elio de Angelis, and Marc Surer (Brabham), completed the points-scoring finishers.

== Classification ==
=== Qualifying ===
Pos	No	Driver	Constructor	Q1	Q2	Gap
1	2	(France) Alain Prost	McLaren-TAG	1:25.490	no time	
2	5	(United Kingdom) Nigel Mansell	Williams-Honda	1:26.453	1:26.052	+0.562
3	1	(Austria) Niki Lauda	McLaren-TAG	1:26.250	1:26.727	+0.760
4	6	(Finland) Keke Rosberg	Williams-Honda	1:26.333	1:26.762	+0.843
5	7	(Brazil) Nelson Piquet	Brabham-BMW	1:26.568	1:26.404	+0.914
6	19	(Italy) Teo Fabi	Toleman-Hart	1:26.664	11:12.639	+1.174
7	11	(Italy) Elio de Angelis	Lotus-Renault	1:26.799	no time	+1.309
8	15	(France) Patrick Tambay	Renault	1:27.722	1:27.502	+2.012
9	27	(Italy) Michele Alboreto	Ferrari	1:29.774	1:27.516	+2.026
10	22	(Italy) Riccardo Patrese	Alfa Romeo	1:29.485	1:27.851	+2.361
11	8	(Switzerland) Marc Surer	Brabham-BMW	1:27.954	1:50.796	+2.464
12	28	(Sweden) Stefan Johansson	Ferrari	1:28.134	1:27.961	+2.471
13	16	(United Kingdom) Derek Warwick	Renault	1:30.602	1:28.006	+2.516
14	12	(Brazil) Ayrton Senna	Lotus-Renault	1:28.123	3:04.856	+2.633
15	26	(France) Jacques Laffite	Ligier-Renault	1:29.181	1:28.249	+2.759
16	18	(Belgium) Thierry Boutsen	Arrows-BMW	1:28.617	1:28.262	+2.772
17	17	(Austria) Gerhard Berger	Arrows-BMW	1:28.566	1:28.762	+3.076
18	25	(Italy) Andrea de Cesaris	Ligier-Renault	1:28.666	no time	+3.176
19	20	(Italy) Piercarlo Ghinzani	Toleman-Hart	1:28.894	no time	+3.404
20	23	(United States) Eddie Cheever	Alfa Romeo	1:29.031	1:29.608	+3.541
21	10	(France) Philippe Alliot	RAM-Hart	1:32.766	1:29.827	+4.337
22	3	(West Germany) Stefan Bellof	Tyrrell-Renault	1:31.022	1:30.514	+5.024
23	9	(United Kingdom) Kenny Acheson	RAM-Hart	no time	1:35.072	+9.582
24	24	(Netherlands) Huub Rothengatter	Osella-Alfa Romeo	1:35.329	1:58.090	+9.839
25	30	(United Kingdom) Jonathan Palmer	Zakspeed	1:36.060	1:35.787	+10.297
26	29	(Italy) Pierluigi Martini	Minardi-Motori Moderni	10:36.417	1:36.765	+11.275
DNQ	4	(United Kingdom) Martin Brundle	Tyrrell-Ford	1:39.247	1:37.317	+11.827

=== Race ===
Pos	No	Driver	Constructor	Laps	Time/Retired	Grid	Points
1	2	(France) Alain Prost	McLaren-TAG	52	1:20:12.583	1	9
2	12	(Brazil) Ayrton Senna	Lotus-Renault	52	+ 30.002	14	6
3	27	(Italy) Michele Alboreto	Ferrari	52	+ 34.356	9	4
4	28	(Sweden) Stefan Johansson	Ferrari	52	+ 39.073	12	3
5	11	(Italy) Elio de Angelis	Lotus-Renault	52	+ 1:22.092	7	2
6	8	(Switzerland) Marc Surer	Brabham-BMW	51	+ 1 lap	11	1
7	3	(Germany) Stefan Bellof	Tyrrell-Renault	49	Out of fuel	22	
8	18	(Belgium) Thierry Boutsen	Arrows-BMW	49	+ 3 laps	16	
9	24	(Netherlands) Huub Rothengatter	Osella-Alfa Romeo	48	+ 4 laps	24	
10	15	(France) Patrick Tambay	Renault	46	Engine	8	
Ret	26	(France) Jacques Laffite	Ligier-Renault	43	Accident	15	
Ret	29	(Italy) Pierluigi Martini	Minardi-Motori Moderni	40	Suspension	26	
Ret	1	(Austria) Niki Lauda	McLaren-TAG	39	Engine	3	
Ret	17	(Austria) Gerhard Berger	Arrows-BMW	33	Turbo	17	
Ret	19	(Italy) Teo Fabi	Toleman-Hart	31	Electrical	6	
Ret	16	(United Kingdom) Derek Warwick	Renault	29	Engine	13	
Ret	10	(United Kingdom) Kenny Acheson	RAM-Hart	28	Engine	23	
Ret	7	(Brazil) Nelson Piquet	Brabham-BMW	26	Exhaust	5	
Ret	5	(United Kingdom) Nigel Mansell	Williams-Honda	25	Engine	2	
Ret	22	(Italy) Riccardo Patrese	Alfa Romeo	25	Engine	10	
Ret	30	(United Kingdom) Jonathan Palmer	Zakspeed	17	Engine	25	
Ret	9	(France) Philippe Alliot	RAM-Hart	16	Turbo	21	
Ret	25	(Italy) Andrea de Cesaris	Ligier-Renault	13	Accident	18	
Ret	23	(United States) Eddie Cheever	Alfa Romeo	6	Turbo	20	
Ret	6	(Finland) Keke Rosberg	Williams-Honda	4	Oil pressure	4	
DNS	20	(Italy) Piercarlo Ghinzani	Toleman-Hart	0	Car raced by Fabi	19	

== Championship standings after the race ==
Drivers' Championship standings

Pos	Driver	Points
1	(France) Alain Prost	50
2	(Italy) Michele Alboreto	50
3	(Italy) Elio de Angelis	28
4	(Sweden) Stefan Johansson	19
5	(Finland) Keke Rosberg	18

Constructors' Championship standings

Pos	Constructor	Points
1	(Italy) Ferrari	72
2	(United Kingdom) McLaren-TAG	55
3	(United Kingdom) Lotus-Renault	43
4	(United Kingdom) Williams-Honda	24
5	(United Kingdom) Brabham-BMW	15

- Note: Only the top five positions are included for both sets of standings.

Previous race: 1985 German Grand Prix	FIA Formula One World Championship; 1985 season	Next race: 1985 Dutch Grand Prix
Previous race: 1984 Austrian Grand Prix	Austrian Grand Prix	Next race: 1986 Austrian Grand Prix
