= 1984 Belgian Grand Prix =

- Race 3 of 16 in the 1984 Formula One World Championship

Race details
- Date: 29 April 1984
- Official name: XL Grote Prijs van België
- Location: Circuit Zolder; Heusden-Zolder, Limburg, Belgium
- Course: Permanent racing facility
- Course length: 4.262 km (2.648 miles)
- Distance: 70 laps, 298.34 km (185.38 miles)

Pole position
Driver	(Italy) Michele Alboreto	Ferrari
- Time: 1:14.846

Fastest lap
Driver	(France) René Arnoux	Ferrari
- Time: 1:19.294 on lap 64

Podium
First	(Italy) Michele Alboreto	Ferrari
Second	(United Kingdom) Derek Warwick	Renault
Third	(France) René Arnoux	Ferrari

The 1984 Belgian Grand Prix was a Formula One motor race held at Circuit Zolder on 29 April 1984. It was the third race of the 1984 Formula One World Championship. It was the 42nd Belgian Grand Prix, and the tenth and last to be held at Zolder. The race was held over 70 laps of the 4.26-kilometre (2.65 mi) circuit for a race distance of 298.3 kilometres (185.4 mi).

The race was won from pole position by Italian driver Michele Alboreto, driving a Ferrari. It was the third Grand Prix victory for Alboreto, who also became the first Italian driver to win for Ferrari since Ludovico Scarfiotti at the 1966 Italian Grand Prix. British driver Derek Warwick finished second in a Renault, some 42 seconds behind, with Alboreto's French teammate René Arnoux third.

Warwick moved into second place in the Drivers' Championship, five points behind Frenchman Alain Prost, who failed to finish in his McLaren-TAG.

== Qualifying ==
=== Qualifying report ===
Goodyear dominated qualifying filling six of the top seven places with Michele Alboreto securing his first career pole position. Ferrari team mate René Arnoux was second, followed by Keke Rosberg in the Williams-Honda. Renault's Derek Warwick, the first Michelin runner, was fourth ahead of Elio de Angelis in the Lotus-Renault and the surprisingly fast ATS-BMW of Manfred Winkelhock. The McLaren-TAGs were off the pace with points leader Alain Prost in eighth and Niki Lauda in 14th. Reigning world champion Nelson Piquet qualified his Brabham-BMW ninth. The best of the Pirelli runners was Johnny Cecotto in 16th in his Toleman-Hart. The only non-qualifier was Philippe Alliot in his RAM-Hart.

=== Qualifying classification ===
Pos	No	Driver	Constructor	Q1	Q2	Gap
1	27	(Italy) Michele Alboreto	Ferrari	1:18.369	1:14.846	
2	28	(France) René Arnoux	Ferrari	1:18.017	1:15.398	+0.552
3	6	(Finland) Keke Rosberg	Williams-Honda	1:18.617	1:15.414	+0.568
4	16	(United Kingdom) Derek Warwick	Renault	1:16.311	1:15.611	+0.765
5	11	(Italy) Elio de Angelis	Lotus-Renault	1:17.705	1:15.979	+1.133
6	14	(West Germany) Manfred Winkelhock	ATS-BMW	1:18.048	1:16.130	+1.284
7	22	(Italy) Riccardo Patrese	Alfa Romeo	1:18.052	1:16.431	+1.585
8	7	(France) Alain Prost	McLaren-TAG	1:16.587	1:16.595	+1.741
9	1	(Brazil) Nelson Piquet	Brabham-BMW	1:16.604	1:24.286	+1.758
10	12	(United Kingdom) Nigel Mansell	Lotus-Renault	1:17.433	1:16.720	+1.874
11	23	(United States) Eddie Cheever	Alfa Romeo	1:18.401	1:16.746	+1.900
12	15	(France) Patrick Tambay	Renault	1:18.753	1:17.171	+2.325
13	26	(Italy) Andrea de Cesaris	Ligier-Renault	1:18.239	1:17.471	+2.625
14	8	(Austria) Niki Lauda	McLaren-TAG	1:18.831	1:18.071	+3.225
15	5	(France) Jacques Laffite	Williams-Honda	1:19.230	1:18.125	+3.279
16	20	(Venezuela) Johnny Cecotto	Toleman-Hart	1:19.537	1:18.321	+3.475
17	18	(Belgium) Thierry Boutsen	Arrows-BMW	1:19.164	1:18.351	+3.505
18	2	(Italy) Teo Fabi	Brabham-BMW	1:20.193	1:18.848	+4.002
19	19	(Brazil) Ayrton Senna	Toleman-Hart	1:18.914	1:18.876	+4.030
20	24	(Italy) Piercarlo Ghinzani	Osella-Alfa Romeo	1:21.432	1:19.734	+4.888
21	4	(West Germany) Stefan Bellof	Tyrrell-Ford	1:21.003	1:19.811	+4.965
22	3	(United Kingdom) Martin Brundle	Tyrrell-Ford	1:20.527	1:20.123	+5.277
23	25	(France) François Hesnault	Ligier-Renault	1:20.439	1:21.493	+5.593
24	17	(Switzerland) Marc Surer	Arrows-Ford	1:20.615	1:21.088	+5.769
25	21	(Italy) Mauro Baldi	Spirit-Hart	1:23.462	1:20.644	+5.798
26	10	(United Kingdom) Jonathan Palmer	RAM-Hart	1:25.647	1:20.793	+5.947
DNQ	9	(France) Philippe Alliot	RAM-Hart	1:21.253	1:44.990	+6.407

== Race ==
=== Race report ===
Alboreto led all 70 laps and was even able to retain the lead during pit stops, despite Piquet pushing through without stopping. Warwick started well to run second for much of the race with Arnoux, Winkelhock and de Angelis pursuing. Prost and Riccardo Patrese were early retirements with Johnny Cecotto dropping out on lap 1 with a broken clutch.

Lauda's McLaren MP4/2 broke its water pump at half-distance, the second such failure for the TAG-Porsche engine after Prost suffered the same fate on the warm up lap in South Africa. Shortly afterwards Winkelhock stopped and Andrea de Cesaris crashed his Ligier JS23-Renault. Piquet found himself third after the stops, but faded as the race neared its conclusion. Arnoux moved into third until he was caught by Rosberg. Piquet's BMW engine blew and with a lap to go and Rosberg ran out of fuel, allowing Arnoux to join Alboreto and Warwick on the podium. Rosberg was classified fourth, with de Angelis fifth and Stefan Bellof completing the top six in his Tyrrell 012-Ford.

=== Post race ===
The results would change months later as the impact of Tyrrell Racing's disqualification from the 1984 season saw Stefan Bellof removed from sixth position, promoting Ayrton Senna's Toleman TG183B into the points.

The Belgian Grand Prix would return to traditional home at Circuit de Spa-Francorchamps in 1985. The shortened version of the home of Belgian motorsport had its Formula One debut the previous year and proven instantly popular as Gilles Villeneuve's death two years earlier at Zolder was still fresh.

=== Race classification ===
Pos	No	Driver	Constructor	Laps	Time/Retired	Grid	Points
1	27	(Italy) Michele Alboreto	Ferrari	70	1:36:32.048	1	9
2	16	(United Kingdom) Derek Warwick	Renault	70	+ 42.386	4	6
3	28	(France) René Arnoux	Ferrari	70	+ 1:09.803	2	4
4	6	(Finland) Keke Rosberg	Williams-Honda	69	Out of fuel	3	3
5	11	(Italy) Elio de Angelis	Lotus-Renault	69	+ 1 lap	5	2
6	19	(Brazil) Ayrton Senna	Toleman-Hart	68	+ 2 laps	19	1
7	15	(France) Patrick Tambay	Renault	68	+ 2 laps	12	
8	17	(Switzerland) Marc Surer	Arrows-Ford	68	+ 2 laps	24	
9	1	(Brazil) Nelson Piquet	Brabham-BMW	66	Engine	9	
10	10	(United Kingdom) Jonathan Palmer	RAM-Hart	64	+ 6 laps	26	
Ret	21	(Italy) Mauro Baldi	Spirit-Hart	53	Suspension	25	
Ret	26	(Italy) Andrea de Cesaris	Ligier-Renault	42	Accident	13	
Ret	2	(Italy) Teo Fabi	Brabham-BMW	42	Spun off	18	
Ret	14	(West Germany) Manfred Winkelhock	ATS-BMW	39	Exhaust	6	
Ret	8	(Austria) Niki Lauda	McLaren-TAG	35	Water pump	14	
Ret	23	(United States) Eddie Cheever	Alfa Romeo	28	Engine	11	
Ret	5	(France) Jacques Laffite	Williams-Honda	15	Electrical	15	
Ret	25	(France) François Hesnault	Ligier-Renault	15	Radiator	23	
Ret	18	(Belgium) Thierry Boutsen	Arrows-BMW	15	Engine	17	
Ret	24	(Italy) Piercarlo Ghinzani	Osella-Alfa Romeo	14	Transmission	20	
Ret	12	(United Kingdom) Nigel Mansell	Lotus-Renault	14	Clutch	10	
Ret	7	(France) Alain Prost	McLaren-TAG	5	Distributor	8	
Ret	22	(Italy) Riccardo Patrese	Alfa Romeo	2	Ignition	7	
Ret	20	(Venezuela) Johnny Cecotto	Toleman-Hart	1	Clutch	16	
DSQ	4	(West Germany) Stefan Bellof	Tyrrell-Ford	69	Disqualified	21	
DSQ	3	(United Kingdom) Martin Brundle	Tyrrell-Ford	51	Disqualified	22	
DNQ	9	(France) Philippe Alliot	RAM-Hart				

== Championship standings after the race ==
Drivers' Championship standings

Pos	Driver	Points
1	(France) Alain Prost	15
2	(United Kingdom) Derek Warwick	10
3	(Italy) Michele Alboreto	9
4	(Austria) Niki Lauda	9
5	(Finland) Keke Rosberg	9

Constructors' Championship standings

Pos	Constructor	Points
1	(United Kingdom) McLaren-TAG	24
2	(Italy) Ferrari	13
3	(France) Renault	11
4	(United Kingdom) Williams-Honda	9
5	(United Kingdom) Lotus-Renault	6

- Note: Only the top five positions are included for both sets of standings. Points accurate at final declaration of results. Tyrrell and its drivers were subsequently disqualified and their points reallocated.

Previous race: 1984 South African Grand Prix	FIA Formula One World Championship; 1984 season	Next race: 1984 San Marino Grand Prix
Previous race: 1983 Belgian Grand Prix	Belgian Grand Prix	Next race: 1985 Belgian Grand Prix
