= 1984 French Grand Prix =

- Race 5 of 16 in the 1984 Formula One World Championship

Race details
- Date: 20 May 1984
- Official name: 70e Grand Prix de France
- Location: Dijon-Prenois, Dijon, France
- Course: Permanent racing facility
- Course length: 3.801 km (2.361 miles)
- Distance: 79 laps, 300.279 km (186.519 miles)
- Weather: Dry

Pole position
Driver	(France) Patrick Tambay	Renault
- Time: 1:02.200

Fastest lap
Driver	(France) Alain Prost	McLaren-TAG
- Time: 1:05.257 on lap 59

Podium
First	(Austria) Niki Lauda	McLaren-TAG
Second	(France) Patrick Tambay	Renault
Third	(United Kingdom) Nigel Mansell	Lotus-Renault

The 1984 French Grand Prix was a Formula One motor race held at Dijon-Prenois near Dijon, France on 20 May 1984. It was the fifth race of the 1984 Formula One World Championship.

This was the final Formula One race to be held at the 3.801 km (2.362 mi) Dijon-Prenois circuit, as it was deemed too short by governing body FISA. Fittingly in France, Frenchman Patrick Tambay, in the all-French team (French car, French engine, French tyres and French fuel) scored the Equipe Renault team's last pole position until their return to the sport in 2002.

Double World Champion Niki Lauda won the race in his McLaren-TAG, his first win in France since 1975. Tambay finished second in his Renault RE50, with the Lotus-Renault of Nigel Mansell third. Lauda's team-mate and World Championship leader, Alain Prost, could only manage seventh after he was forced to pit to change a loose wheel.

Andrea de Cesaris failed to qualify his Ligier, but nonetheless started the race and finished tenth. De Cesaris' Friday qualifying time was disallowed when his car's onboard fire extinguisher was found to be empty, before rain in the Saturday session prevented him from setting a time fast enough to make the grid. Ligier took the bizarre step of withdrawing their second car, driven by François Hesnault (who had qualified 14th), in order to allow de Cesaris to start 26th and last.

== Classification ==
=== Qualifying ===
Pos	No	Driver	Constructor	Q1	Q2	Gap
1	15	(France) Patrick Tambay	Renault	1:02.200	1:24.855	—
2	11	(Italy) Elio de Angelis	Lotus-Renault	1:02.336	1:20.859	+0.136
3	1	(Brazil) Nelson Piquet	Brabham-BMW	1:02.806	1:30.893	+0.606
4	6	(Finland) Keke Rosberg	Williams-Honda	1:02.908	1:30.872	+0.708
5	7	(France) Alain Prost	McLaren-TAG	1:02.982	1:25.397	+0.782
6	12	(United Kingdom) Nigel Mansell	Lotus-Renault	1:03.200	1:20.061	+1.000
7	16	(United Kingdom) Derek Warwick	Renault	1:03.540	1:23.363	+1.340
8	14	(West Germany) Manfred Winkelhock	ATS-BMW	1:03.865	1:28.393	+1.665
9	8	(Austria) Niki Lauda	McLaren-TAG	1:04.419	1:25.567	+2.219
10	27	(Italy) Michele Alboreto	Ferrari	1:04.459	1:22.749	+2.259
11	28	(France) René Arnoux	Ferrari	1:04.917	1:22.707	+2.517
12	5	(France) Jacques Laffite	Williams-Honda	1:05.410	1:27.917	+3.210
13	19	(Brazil) Ayrton Senna	Toleman-Hart	1:05.744	1:28.225	+3.544
14	18	(Belgium) Thierry Boutsen	Arrows-BMW	1:05.972	1:25.252	+3.772
15	22	(Italy) Riccardo Patrese	Alfa Romeo	1:06.172	1:28.124	+3.972
16	23	(United States) Eddie Cheever	Alfa Romeo	1:06.281	1:23.770	+4.081
17	2	(Italy) Teo Fabi	Brabham-BMW	1:06.370	no time	+4.170
18	20	(Venezuela) Johnny Cecotto	Toleman-Hart	1:08.109	1:31.359	+5.989
19	17	(Switzerland) Marc Surer	Arrows-Ford	1:08.457	1:26.943	+6.257
20	4	(West Germany) Stefan Bellof	Tyrrell-Ford	1:08.608	1:29.539	+6.408
21	10	(United Kingdom) Jonathan Palmer	RAM-Hart	1:09.047	no time	+6.847
22	9	(France) Philippe Alliot	RAM-Hart	1:09.447	no time	+7.247
23	3	(United Kingdom) Martin Brundle	Tyrrell-Ford	1:09.554	1:28.555	+7.354
24	21	(Italy) Mauro Baldi	Spirit-Hart	1:09.629	1:31.021	+7.429
25	24	(Italy) Piercarlo Ghinzani	Osella-Alfa Romeo	1:11.625	1:32.541	+10.431
26	26	(Italy) Andrea de Cesaris	Ligier-Renault	no time	1:22.388	+20.188
—	25	(France) François Hesnault*	Ligier-Renault	1:05.850	1:22.272	—

* François Hesnault qualified 14th with a time of 1:05.850 in the first qualifying session. However, Ligier withdrew his entry in order for their #1 driver Andrea de Cesaris to start, after the Italian's Friday time was disallowed due to an empty on-board fire extinguisher in his JS23 and he could not post a quick time in the wet final session.

=== Race ===
Pos	No	Driver	Constructor	Laps	Time/Retired	Grid	Points
1	8	(Austria) Niki Lauda	McLaren-TAG	79	1:31:11.951	9	9
2	15	(France) Patrick Tambay	Renault	79	+ 7.154	1	6
3	12	(United Kingdom) Nigel Mansell	Lotus-Renault	79	+ 23.969	6	4
4	28	(France) René Arnoux	Ferrari	79	+ 43.706	11	3
5	11	(Italy) Elio de Angelis	Lotus-Renault	79	+ 1:06.125	2	2
6	6	(Finland) Keke Rosberg	Williams-Honda	78	+ 1 Lap	4	1
7	7	(France) Alain Prost	McLaren-TAG	78	+ 1 Lap	5	
8	5	(France) Jacques Laffite	Williams-Honda	78	+ 1 Lap	12	
9	2	(Italy) Teo Fabi	Brabham-BMW	78	+ 1 Lap	17	
10	26	(Italy) Andrea de Cesaris	Ligier-Renault	77	+ 2 Laps	26	
11	18	(Belgium) Thierry Boutsen	Arrows-BMW	77	+ 2 Laps	14	
12	24	(Italy) Piercarlo Ghinzani	Osella-Alfa Romeo	74	+ 5 Laps	25	
13	10	(United Kingdom) Jonathan Palmer	RAM-Hart	72	+ 7 Laps	21	
DSQ	3	(United Kingdom) Martin Brundle	Tyrrell-Ford	76	Disqualified	23	
Ret	21	(Italy) Mauro Baldi	Spirit-Hart	61	Engine	24	
Ret	16	(United Kingdom) Derek Warwick	Renault	53	Accident	7	
Ret	17	(Switzerland) Marc Surer	Arrows-Ford	51	Accident	19	
Ret	23	(United States) Eddie Cheever	Alfa Romeo	51	Engine	16	
Ret	19	(Brazil) Ayrton Senna	Toleman-Hart	35	Turbo	13	
Ret	27	(Italy) Michele Alboreto	Ferrari	33	Engine	10	
Ret	20	(Venezuela) Johnny Cecotto	Toleman-Hart	22	Turbo	18	
Ret	22	(Italy) Riccardo Patrese	Alfa Romeo	15	Engine	15	
Ret	1	(Brazil) Nelson Piquet	Brabham-BMW	11	Turbo	3	
DSQ	4	(West Germany) Stefan Bellof	Tyrrell-Ford	11	Disqualified	20	
Ret	14	(West Germany) Manfred Winkelhock	ATS-BMW	5	Clutch	8	
Ret	9	(France) Philippe Alliot	RAM-Hart	4	Electrical	22	

== Championship standings after the race ==
Drivers' Championship standings

Pos	Driver	Points
1	(France) Alain Prost	24
2	(Austria) Niki Lauda	18
3	(United Kingdom) Derek Warwick	13
4	(France) René Arnoux	13
5	(Italy) Elio de Angelis	12

Constructors' Championship standings

Pos	Constructor	Points
1	(United Kingdom) McLaren-TAG	42
2	(Italy) Ferrari	22
3	(France) Renault	20
4	(United Kingdom) Lotus-Renault	16
5	(United Kingdom) Williams-Honda	10

- Note: Only the top five positions are included for both sets of standings. Points accurate at final declaration of results. Tyrrell and its drivers were subsequently disqualified and their points reallocated.

Previous race: 1984 San Marino Grand Prix	FIA Formula One World Championship; 1984 season	Next race: 1984 Monaco Grand Prix
Previous race: 1983 French Grand Prix; Previous race at Dijon: 1982 Swiss Grand Prix	French Grand Prix	Next race: 1985 French Grand Prix
