= 1984 South African Grand Prix =

- Race 2 of 16 in the 1984 Formula One World Championship
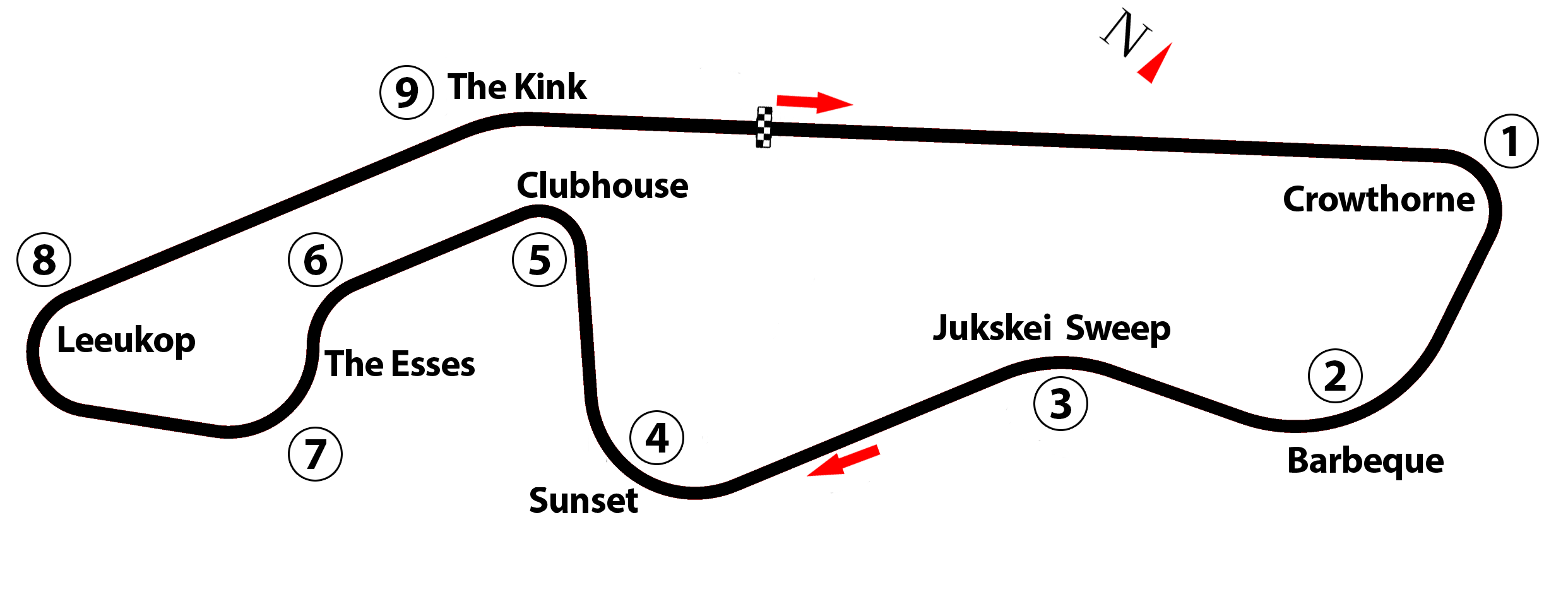

Race details
- Date: 7 April 1984
- Official name: XVIII National Panasonic Grand Prix of South Africa
- Location: Kyalami; Midrand, Transvaal Province, South Africa
- Course: Permanent racing facility
- Course length: 4.104 km (2.550 miles)
- Distance: 75 laps, 307.800 km (191.258 miles)
- Weather: Dry

Pole position
| Driver | (Brazil) Nelson Piquet | Brabham-BMW |
- Time: 1:04.871

Fastest lap
| Driver | (France) Patrick Tambay | Renault |
- Time: 1:08.877 on lap 64

Podium
| First | (Austria) Niki Lauda | McLaren-TAG |
| Second | (France) Alain Prost | McLaren-TAG |
| Third | (United Kingdom) Derek Warwick | Renault |

The 1984 South African Grand Prix was a Formula One motor race held at Kyalami on 7 April 1984. It was race 2 of 16 in the 1984 Formula One World Championship. The 75-lap race was won by Niki Lauda, driving a McLaren-TAG, with teammate Alain Prost second and Derek Warwick third in a Renault.

== Report ==
=== Qualifying ===
Qualifying saw reigning World Champion Nelson Piquet take the first of an eventual nine pole positions for 1984 in his Brabham-BMW (which was clocked at 325 km/h (202 mph) on the circuit's long front straight), with Keke Rosberg alongside him on the front row in his Williams-Honda. On the second row were Nigel Mansell in the Lotus and Patrick Tambay in the factory Renault, while on the third row were Alain Prost in the McLaren and Teo Fabi in the second Brabham. The top ten was completed by Elio de Angelis in the second Lotus, Niki Lauda in the second McLaren, Derek Warwick in the second Renault and Michele Alboreto in the Ferrari. The Cosworth-powered Tyrrells and Arrows struggled, with Thierry Boutsen coming 27th and last in his Arrows and thus failing to qualify.

=== Race ===
In the Sunday morning warm-up session Piercarlo Ghinzani, who had qualified 20th in his Osella, crashed heavily at the fast left-hand Jukskei Sweep, the car bursting into flames. Ghinzani escaped with minor burns on his hands, and subsequently withdrew from the race, thus promoting Boutsen to the last grid spot.

Before the start of the race, Prost's McLaren refused to fire up thanks to a fuel pump failure and his McLaren was pushed to the side of the road and he started from the pitlane in the spare car. In fact, Ghinzani's accident and the subsequent 30 minutes delay before the start was extremely fortunate for Prost. During the warmup, Lauda had a chronic misfire in his TAG-Porsche race engine. It took the McLaren team until 13 minutes into the extra 30 to completely change the electrical system in Lauda's car, which cured the low-end misfire but one still remained intermittent between 7,500 and 8,500 rpm, but it was driveable and allowed Lauda to be 2nd fastest in the warmup to Piquet. In truth however, without Ghinzani's accident and the extra 30 minutes, the McLaren team wouldn't have fixed Lauda's car on time and the former dual World Champion would have been forced to race the spare car, meaning Prost would not have even started.

At the start, Piquet almost stalled on the grid and was passed by Rosberg and Mansell. The Lotus then faltered and Mansell fell down the order, putting Piquet back up to second by the first corner. At the end of lap 1, Piquet passed Rosberg for the lead, before teammate Fabi moved into second on lap 2. Lauda had made a good start to run fourth; he then overtook Rosberg on lap 4 and Fabi on lap 10. Both Brabhams then hit trouble, needing new tyres before retiring with turbo failures, Fabi on lap 19 and Piquet on lap 30.

From there, Lauda controlled the race and went on to win easily, with Prost over a minute behind in second and the only other driver on the lead lap. Warwick gained his first Formula One podium by finishing third, while completing the top six were Riccardo Patrese (Alfa Romeo, its second points finish in a row giving more, somewhat false, hope that the 890T V8 would be competitive), Andrea de Cesaris (Ligier-Renault) and, gaining his first ever World Championship point, Ayrton Senna in his Toleman-Hart.

== Classification ==
=== Qualifying ===
| Pos | No | Driver | Constructor | Q1 | Q2 | Gap |
|---|---|---|---|---|---|---|
| 1 | 1 | (Brazil) Nelson Piquet | Brabham-BMW | 1:05.280 | 1:04.871 | — |
| 2 | 6 | (Finland) Keke Rosberg | Williams-Honda | 1:05.127 | 1:05.058 | +0.187 |
| 3 | 12 | (United Kingdom) Nigel Mansell | Lotus-Renault | 1:05.792 | 1:05.125 | +0.254 |
| 4 | 15 | (France) Patrick Tambay | Renault | 1:05.588 | 1:05.339 | +0.468 |
| 5 | 7 | (France) Alain Prost | McLaren-TAG | 1:06.576 | 1:05.354 | +0.483 |
| 6 | 2 | (Italy) Teo Fabi | Brabham-BMW | 1:05.923 | 1:07.236 | +1.052 |
| 7 | 11 | (Italy) Elio de Angelis | Lotus-Renault | 1:06.305 | 1:05.953 | +1.082 |
| 8 | 8 | (Austria) Niki Lauda | McLaren-TAG | 1:06.238 | 1:06.043 | +1.172 |
| 9 | 16 | (United Kingdom) Derek Warwick | Renault | 1:06.056 | 1:06.491 | +1.185 |
| 10 | 27 | (Italy) Michele Alboreto | Ferrari | 1:07.404 | 1:06.323 | +1.452 |
| 11 | 5 | (France) Jacques Laffite | Williams-Honda | 1:07.142 | 1:06.762 | +1.891 |
| 12 | 14 | (West Germany) Manfred Winkelhock | ATS-BMW | 1:06.974 | 1:07.417 | +2.103 |
| 13 | 19 | (Brazil) Ayrton Senna | Toleman-Hart | 1:07.657 | 1:06.981 | +2.110 |
| 14 | 26 | (Italy) Andrea de Cesaris | Ligier-Renault | 1:09.132 | 1:07.245 | +2.374 |
| 15 | 28 | (France) René Arnoux | Ferrari | 1:07.514 | 1:07.345 | +2.474 |
| 16 | 23 | (United States) Eddie Cheever | Alfa Romeo | 1:07.704 | 1:07.993 | +2.833 |
| 17 | 25 | (France) François Hesnault | Ligier-Renault | 1:09.909 | 1:07.787 | +2.916 |
| 18 | 22 | (Italy) Riccardo Patrese | Alfa Romeo | 1:08.399 | 1:08.042 | +3.171 |
| 19 | 20 | (Venezuela) Johnny Cecotto | Toleman-Hart | 1:09.892 | 1:08.298 | +3.427 |
| 20 | 24 | (Italy) Piercarlo Ghinzani | Osella-Alfa Romeo | 1:10.829 | 1:09.609 | +4.738 |
| 21 | 21 | (Italy) Mauro Baldi | Spirit-Hart | 1:10.450 | 1:09.923 | +5.052 |
| 22 | 10 | (United Kingdom) Jonathan Palmer | RAM-Hart | no time | 1:10.383 | +5.512 |
| 23 | 9 | (France) Philippe Alliot | RAM-Hart | no time | 1:10.619 | +5.748 |
| 24 | 17 | (Switzerland) Marc Surer | Arrows-Ford | 1:12.227 | 1:11.808 | +6.937 |
| 25 | 4 | (West Germany) Stefan Bellof | Tyrrell-Ford | 1:12.322 | 1:12.022 | +7.151 |
| 26 | 3 | (United Kingdom) Martin Brundle | Tyrrell-Ford | 1:12.233 | 1:12.453 | +7.362 |
| 27 | 18 | (Belgium) Thierry Boutsen | Arrows-Ford | 1:12.326 | 1:12.274 | +7.403 |

=== Race ===
| Pos | No | Driver | Constructor | Laps | Time/Retired | Grid | Points |
|---|---|---|---|---|---|---|---|
| 1 | 8 | (Austria) Niki Lauda | McLaren-TAG | 75 | 1:29:23.430 | 8 | 9 |
| 2 | 7 | (France) Alain Prost | McLaren-TAG | 75 | + 1:05.950 | 5 | 6 |
| 3 | 16 | (United Kingdom) Derek Warwick | Renault | 74 | + 1 Lap | 9 | 4 |
| 4 | 22 | (Italy) Riccardo Patrese | Alfa Romeo | 73 | + 2 Laps | 18 | 3 |
| 5 | 26 | (Italy) Andrea de Cesaris | Ligier-Renault | 73 | + 2 Laps | 14 | 2 |
| 6 | 19 | (Brazil) Ayrton Senna | Toleman-Hart | 72 | + 3 Laps | 13 | 1 |
| 7 | 11 | (Italy) Elio de Angelis | Lotus-Renault | 71 | + 4 Laps | 7 | |
| 8 | 21 | (Italy) Mauro Baldi | Spirit-Hart | 71 | + 4 Laps | 20 | |
| 9 | 17 | (Switzerland) Marc Surer | Arrows-Ford | 71 | + 4 Laps | 23 | |
| 10 | 25 | (France) François Hesnault | Ligier-Renault | 71 | + 4 Laps | 17 | |
| 11 | 27 | (Italy) Michele Alboreto | Ferrari | 70 | Ignition | 10 | |
| 12 | 18 | (Belgium) Thierry Boutsen | Arrows-Ford | 70 | + 5 Laps | 26 | |
| DSQ | 3 | (United Kingdom) Martin Brundle | Tyrrell-Ford | 71 | Disqualified | 25 | |
| Ret | 15 | (France) Patrick Tambay | Renault | 66 | Out of Fuel | 4 | |
| DSQ | 4 | (West Germany) Stefan Bellof | Tyrrell-Ford | 60 | Disqualified | 24 | |
| Ret | 5 | (France) Jacques Laffite | Williams-Honda | 60 | Transmission | 11 | |
| Ret | 14 | (West Germany) Manfred Winkelhock | ATS-BMW | 53 | Engine | 12 | |
| Ret | 6 | (Finland) Keke Rosberg | Williams-Honda | 51 | Wheel | 2 | |
| Ret | 12 | (United Kingdom) Nigel Mansell | Lotus-Renault | 51 | Turbo | 3 | |
| Ret | 28 | (France) René Arnoux | Ferrari | 40 | Injection | 15 | |
| Ret | 1 | (Brazil) Nelson Piquet | Brabham-BMW | 29 | Turbo | 1 | |
| Ret | 20 | (Venezuela) Johnny Cecotto | Toleman-Hart | 26 | Tyre | 19 | |
| Ret | 9 | (France) Philippe Alliot | RAM-Hart | 24 | Engine | 22 | |
| Ret | 10 | (United Kingdom) Jonathan Palmer | RAM-Hart | 22 | Gearbox | 21 | |
| Ret | 2 | (Italy) Teo Fabi | Brabham-BMW | 18 | Turbo | 6 | |
| Ret | 23 | (United States) Eddie Cheever | Alfa Romeo | 4 | Radiator | 16 | |
| DNS | 24 | (Italy) Piercarlo Ghinzani | Osella-Alfa Romeo | | Practice Accident | | |

== Championship standings after the race ==
Drivers' Championship standings

| Pos | Driver | Points |
|---|---|---|
| 1 | (France) Alain Prost | 15 |
| 2 | (Austria) Niki Lauda | 9 |
| 3 | (Finland) Keke Rosberg | 6 |
| 4 | (Italy) Elio de Angelis | 4 |
| 5 | (United Kingdom) Derek Warwick | 4 |

Constructors' Championship standings

| Pos | Constructor | Points |
|---|---|---|
| 1 | (United Kingdom) McLaren-TAG | 24 |
| 2 | (United Kingdom) Williams-Honda | 6 |
| 3 | (Italy) Alfa Romeo | 6 |
| 4 | (France) Renault | 5 |
| 5 | (United Kingdom) Lotus-Renault | 4 |

- Note: Only the top five positions are included for both sets of standings. Points accurate at final declaration of results. Tyrrell and its drivers were subsequently disqualified and their points reallocated.

| Previous race: 1984 Brazilian Grand Prix | FIA Formula One World Championship; 1984 season | Next race: 1984 Belgian Grand Prix |
| Previous race: 1983 South African Grand Prix | South African Grand Prix | Next race: 1985 South African Grand Prix |
