= 1985 British Grand Prix =

Eighth race of the 1985 Formula One World Championship

- Race 8 of 16 in the 1985 Formula One World Championship
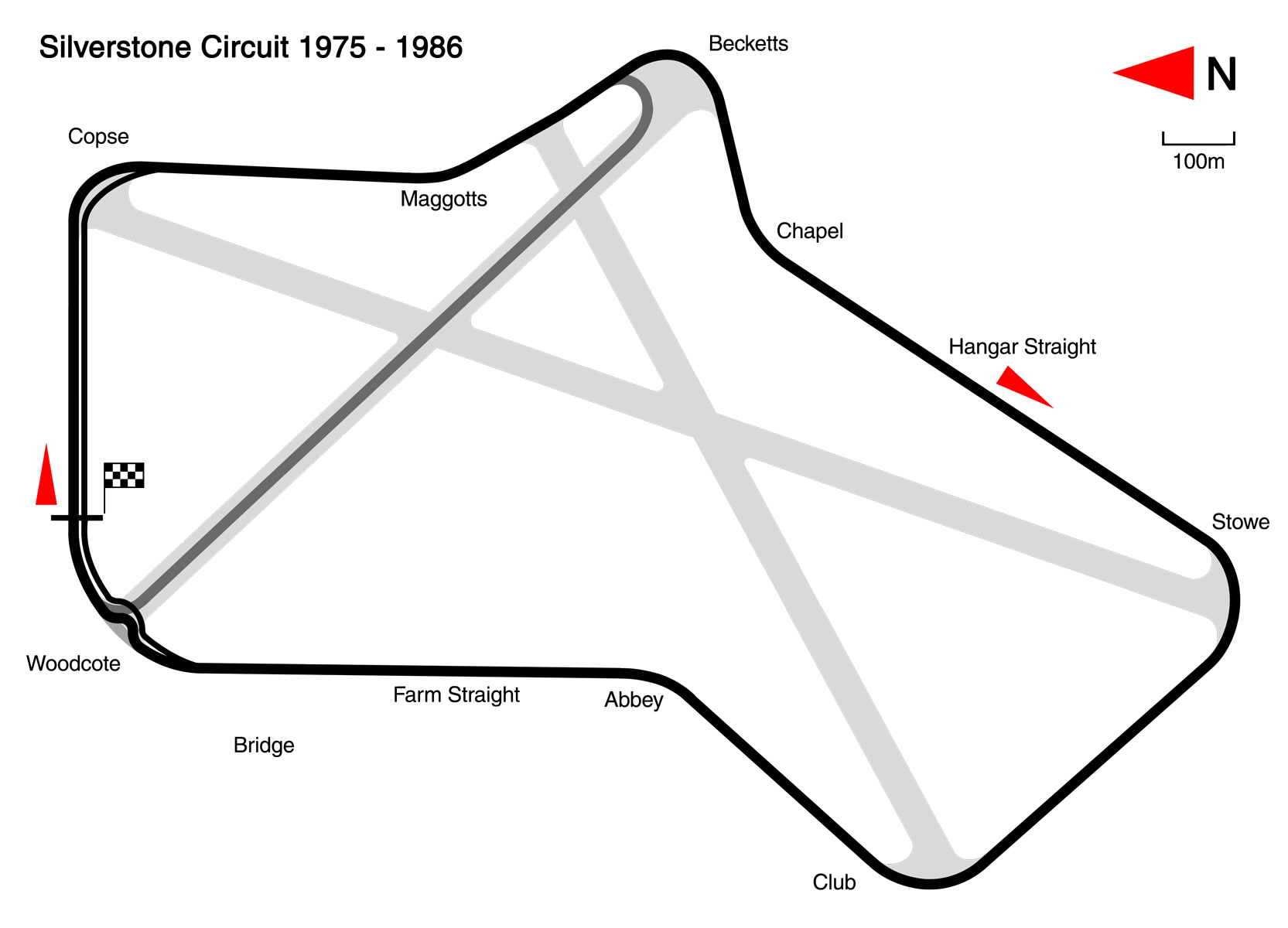

Race details
- Date: 21 July 1985
- Official name: XXXVIII Marlboro British Grand Prix
- Location: Silverstone Circuit; Northamptonshire, Great Britain
- Course: Permanent racing facility
- Course length: 4.719 km (2.932 miles)
- Distance: 65 laps, 306.735 km (190.569 miles)
- Scheduled distance: 66 laps, 311.454 km (193.529 miles)
- Weather: Cool, overcast

Pole position
Driver	(Finland) Keke Rosberg	Williams-Honda
- Time: 1:05.591

Fastest lap
Driver	(France) Alain Prost	McLaren-TAG
- Time: 1:09.886 on lap 43

Podium
First	(France) Alain Prost	McLaren-TAG
Second	(Italy) Michele Alboreto	Ferrari
Third	(France) Jacques Laffite	Ligier-Renault

The 1985 British Grand Prix (formally the XXXVIII Marlboro British Grand Prix) was a Formula One motor race held at Silverstone on 21 July 1985. It was the eighth race of the 1985 Formula One World Championship.

The 65-lap race was won by Alain Prost, driving a McLaren-TAG, after he started from third position. Michele Alboreto finished second in a Ferrari, with Jacques Laffite third in a Ligier-Renault. The win, Prost's third of the season, moved him to within two points of Alboreto at the top of the Drivers' Championship.

== Report ==
Silverstone, a circuit located on a former World War II airfield located between London and Birmingham in England was known for being the fastest circuit used by Formula One; it was even faster than Monza, Österreichring and Hockenheim. The circuit's layout back then was quite different and simpler compared to the current layout used from 2010 onwards. Silverstone alternated the British Grand Prix with Brands Hatch and each circuit would host it every 2nd year.

Qualifying saw Keke Rosberg underline Silverstone's incredibly high speed laps by taking pole in his Williams with a lap of 1:05.591. At an average speed of 160.9 mph (259 km/h), it stood as the fastest qualifying lap in F1 history for 17 years. Alongside Rosberg on the front row was Nelson Piquet in the Brabham, while Alain Prost in the McLaren and Ayrton Senna in the Lotus were on the second row. Nigel Mansell in the second Williams and championship leader Michele Alboreto in the Ferrari filled the third row, while on the fourth were Andrea de Cesaris in the Ligier and Elio de Angelis in the second Lotus. Teo Fabi in the Toleman and Niki Lauda in the second McLaren completed the top ten.

At the start of the race, Senna made a superb start and passed Prost, the slow-starting Piquet and Rosberg to take the lead, while Mansell moved up to third and de Cesaris to fifth. Behind them, four cars were eliminated at the first corner, Copse, as Patrick Tambay in the Renault lost control and was hit by the second Ferrari of Stefan Johansson, which also caused the Osella of Piercarlo Ghinzani and the RAM of Philippe Alliot to crash into each other.

Back at the front, de Cesaris passed Prost and then Mansell to be third, before Prost repassed the Ligier on lap 9. Prost later admitted he was apprehensive about being behind the Ligier thanks to the unpredictable de Cesaris' reputation for crashing. Mansell dropped out on lap 18 with a clutch failure, before team-mate Rosberg suffered a broken exhaust four laps later. Senna continued to lead, with Prost now second and Lauda up to third ahead of de Cesaris, Piquet and Alboreto. Prost and Lauda's McLaren-TAG/Porsche MP4/2B's performance through high-speed corners was far superior to that of any other car competing that year – something that was a feature of all of the original Silverstone's 8 corners (10 if the 3-turn sequence of the Woodcote chicane is counted).

Alboreto passed Piquet for fifth, before moving up to fourth on lap 42 when de Cesaris's clutch failed. By then, Senna and Prost were running nose-to-tail. The Frenchman finally passed the Brazilian on lap 58, Lauda's electrics failing on the same lap. Then Senna's fuel injection failed, promoting Alboreto to second, while Jacques Laffite in the second Ligier moved up to third ahead of Piquet.

The chequered flag was erroneously shown at the end of lap 65, one lap early, with Prost having lapped the entire field. Halfway around what was meant to have been the final lap, Laffite ran out of fuel, which annoyed Piquet – he would have thus taken the final podium place had the error not been made. The final points were taken by Derek Warwick in the second Renault and Marc Surer in the second Brabham.

In the Drivers' Championship, Prost moved to within two points of Alboreto, while in the Constructors' Championship McLaren moved up to second, 18 points behind Ferrari.

== Classification ==
=== Qualifying ===
Pos	No	Driver	Constructor	Q1	Q2	Gap
1	6	(Finland) Keke Rosberg	Williams-Honda	1:06.107	1:05.591	
2	7	(Brazil) Nelson Piquet	Brabham-BMW	1:08.933	1:06.249	+0.658
3	2	(France) Alain Prost	McLaren-TAG	1:06.308	1:08.532	+0.717
4	12	(Brazil) Ayrton Senna	Lotus-Renault	1:06.324	1:06.794	+0.733
5	5	(United Kingdom) Nigel Mansell	Williams-Honda	1:09.080	1:06.675	+1.084
6	27	(Italy) Michele Alboreto	Ferrari	1:06.793	1:07.427	+1.202
7	25	(Italy) Andrea de Cesaris	Ligier-Renault	1:11.082	1:07.448	+1.857
8	11	(Italy) Elio de Angelis	Lotus-Renault	1:07.581	1:07.696	+1.990
9	19	(Italy) Teo Fabi	Toleman-Hart	1:07.678	1:07.871	+2.087
10	1	(Austria) Niki Lauda	McLaren-TAG	1:07.743	1:09.001	+2.152
11	28	(Sweden) Stefan Johansson	Ferrari	1:08.169	1:07.887	+2.296
12	16	(United Kingdom) Derek Warwick	Renault	1:08.238	1:08.604	+2.647
13	15	(France) Patrick Tambay	Renault	1:09.898	1:08.240	+2.649
14	22	(Italy) Riccardo Patrese	Alfa Romeo	1:08.384	1:10.110	+2.793
15	8	(Switzerland) Marc Surer	Brabham-BMW	1:09.572	1:08.587	+2.996
16	26	(France) Jacques Laffite	Ligier-Renault	1:10.756	1:08.656	+3.065
17	17	(Austria) Gerhard Berger	Arrows-BMW	1:09.870	1:08.672	+3.081
18	9	(West Germany) Manfred Winkelhock	RAM-Hart	1:10.299	1:09.114	+3.523
19	18	(Belgium) Thierry Boutsen	Arrows-BMW	1:09.413	1:09.131	+3.540
20	3	(United Kingdom) Martin Brundle	Tyrrell-Renault	1:10.718	1:09.242	+3.651
21	10	(France) Philippe Alliot	RAM-Hart	1:11.162	1:09.609	+4.018
22	23	(United States) Eddie Cheever	Alfa Romeo	1:11.072	1:10.345	+4.754
23	29	(Italy) Pierluigi Martini	Minardi-Motori Moderni	1:13.645	1:15.363	+8.054
24	30	(United Kingdom) Jonathan Palmer	Zakspeed	1:17.856	1:13.713	+8.122
25	24	(Italy) Piercarlo Ghinzani	Osella-Alfa Romeo	1:16.400	no time	+10.809
26	4	(West Germany) Stefan Bellof	Tyrrell-Ford	1:17.009	1:16.596	+11.005

=== Race ===
Pos	No	Driver	Constructor	Laps	Time/Retired	Grid	Points
1	2	(France) Alain Prost	McLaren-TAG	65	1:18:10.436	3	9
2	27	(Italy) Michele Alboreto	Ferrari	64	+ 1 Lap	6	6
3	26	(France) Jacques Laffite	Ligier-Renault	64	+ 1 Lap	16	4
4	7	(Brazil) Nelson Piquet	Brabham-BMW	64	+ 1 Lap	2	3
5	16	(United Kingdom) Derek Warwick	Renault	64	+ 1 Lap	12	2
6	8	(Switzerland) Marc Surer	Brabham-BMW	63	+ 2 Laps	15	1
7	3	(United Kingdom) Martin Brundle	Tyrrell-Renault	63	+ 2 Laps	20	
8	17	(Austria) Gerhard Berger	Arrows-BMW	63	+ 2 Laps	17	
9	22	(Italy) Riccardo Patrese	Alfa Romeo	62	+ 3 Laps	14	
10	12	(Brazil) Ayrton Senna	Lotus-Renault	60	Fuel injection, electronics	4	
11	4	(West Germany) Stefan Bellof	Tyrrell-Ford	59	+ 6 Laps	26	
Ret	1	(Austria) Niki Lauda	McLaren-TAG	57	Electrical	10	
Ret	18	(Belgium) Thierry Boutsen	Arrows-BMW	57	Spun Off	19	
Ret	25	(Italy) Andrea de Cesaris	Ligier-Renault	41	Clutch	7	
Ret	29	(Italy) Pierluigi Martini	Minardi-Motori Moderni	38	Transmission	23	
NC	11	(Italy) Elio de Angelis	Lotus-Renault	37	+ 28 Laps	8	
Ret	9	(West Germany) Manfred Winkelhock	RAM-Hart	28	Turbo	18	
Ret	6	(Finland) Keke Rosberg	Williams-Honda	21	Exhaust	1	
Ret	5	(United Kingdom) Nigel Mansell	Williams-Honda	17	Clutch	5	
Ret	23	(United States) Eddie Cheever	Alfa Romeo	17	Turbo	22	
Ret	30	(United Kingdom) Jonathan Palmer	Zakspeed	6	Engine	24	
Ret	19	(Italy) Teo Fabi	Toleman-Hart	4	Transmission	9	
Ret	28	(Sweden) Stefan Johansson	Ferrari	1	Accident	11	
Ret	15	(France) Patrick Tambay	Renault	0	Collision	13	
Ret	10	(France) Philippe Alliot	RAM-Hart	0	Accident	21	
Ret	24	(Italy) Piercarlo Ghinzani	Osella-Alfa Romeo	0	Accident	25	

== Championship standings after the race ==
Drivers' Championship standings

Pos	Driver	Points
1	(Italy) Michele Alboreto	37
2	(France) Alain Prost	35
3	(Italy) Elio de Angelis	26
4	(Finland) Keke Rosberg	18
5	(Sweden) Stefan Johansson	16

Constructors' Championship standings

Pos	Constructor	Points
1	(Italy) Ferrari	56
2	(United Kingdom) McLaren-TAG	38
3	(United Kingdom) Lotus-Renault	35
4	(United Kingdom) Williams-Honda	23
5	(France) Renault	15

- Note: Only the top five positions are included for both sets of standings.

Previous race: 1985 French Grand Prix	FIA Formula One World Championship; 1985 season	Next race: 1985 German Grand Prix
Previous race: 1984 British Grand Prix	British Grand Prix	Next race: 1986 British Grand Prix
