= 1984 Portuguese Grand Prix =

- Race 16 of 16 in the 1984 Formula One World Championship
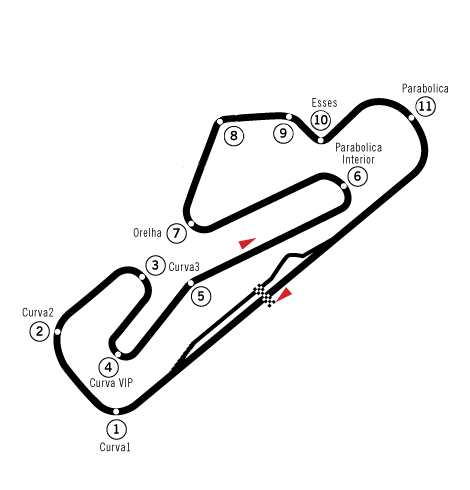

Race details
- Date: 21 October 1984
- Official name: 13º Grande Prémio de Portugal
- Location: Autódromo do Estoril, Estoril, Portugal
- Course: Permanent racing facility
- Course length: 4.35 km (2.702 miles)
- Distance: 70 laps, 304.5 km (189.14 miles)
- Weather: Dry

Pole position
Driver	(Brazil) Nelson Piquet	Brabham-BMW
- Time: 1:21.703

Fastest lap
Driver	(Austria) Niki Lauda	McLaren-TAG
- Time: 1:22.996 on lap 51

Podium
First	(France) Alain Prost	McLaren-TAG
Second	(Austria) Niki Lauda	McLaren-TAG
Third	(Brazil) Ayrton Senna	Toleman-Hart

The 1984 Portuguese Grand Prix was a Formula One motor race held at Estoril on 21 October 1984. It was the sixteenth and final race of the 1984 FIA Formula One World Championship. It was the first World Championship Portuguese Grand Prix since 1960, when it was held at the Boavista street circuit in Oporto.

Niki Lauda needed second place to secure the title, and gained it when Nigel Mansell spun out with 18 laps to go. As a result, he took the title by just half a point from team-mate Alain Prost, remaining the closest title-winning margin in Formula One history. The point-scoring drivers won a total of 13 world championships between them, and the three drivers on the podium were all (at least) triple World Champions from different eras – Lauda, approaching the end of his long and distinguished F1 career, Prost, enjoying the best years of his career, and Ayrton Senna, still at the dawn of his.

After running a strong second behind Prost for most of the race, Mansell's spin on lap 52 was due to his front left brake failing. The Englishman later told that as it was his last race for Lotus before joining Williams in 1985, team boss Peter Warr (whom he had never got along with personally) had refused to give him the brakes he wanted for his Lotus 95T and that it was this that ultimately caused his retirement and handed Lauda the second place he needed to win the World Championship.

The race also represented the last win for French tyre manufacturer Michelin in Formula One until the 2001 San Marino Grand Prix and also the last win for any Formula One driver using a home tyre manufacturer until the 2026 Chinese Grand Prix when Andrea Kimi Antonelli won the race using Italian Pirelli tyres.

== Classification ==
=== Qualifying ===
Pos	No	Driver	Constructor	Q1	Q2	Gap
1	1	(Brazil) Nelson Piquet	Brabham-BMW	1:30.889	1:21.703	—
2	7	(France) Alain Prost	McLaren-TAG	1:28.276	1:21.774	+0.071
3	19	(Brazil) Ayrton Senna	Toleman-Hart	1:30.077	1:21.936	+0.233
4	6	(Finland) Keke Rosberg	Williams-Honda	1:32.269	1:22.049	+0.346
5	11	(Italy) Elio de Angelis	Lotus-Renault	1:28.428	1:22.291	+0.588
6	12	(United Kingdom) Nigel Mansell	Lotus-Renault	1:32.986	1:22.319	+0.616
7	15	(France) Patrick Tambay	Renault	1:29.409	1:22.583	+0.880
8	27	(Italy) Michele Alboreto	Ferrari	1:31.192	1:22.686	+0.983
9	16	(United Kingdom) Derek Warwick	Renault	1:35.913	1:22.801	+1.098
10	20	(Sweden) Stefan Johansson	Toleman-Hart	1:28.991	1:22.942	+1.239
11	8	(Austria) Niki Lauda	McLaren-TAG	1:28.837	1:23.183	+1.480
12	22	(Italy) Riccardo Patrese	Alfa Romeo	1:37.154	1:24.048	+2.345
13	33	(France) Philippe Streiff	Renault	1:37.280	1:24.089	+2.386
14	23	(United States) Eddie Cheever	Alfa Romeo	1:34.809	1:24.235	+2.532
15	5	(France) Jacques Laffite	Williams-Honda	1:39.696	1:24.437	+2.734
16	17	(Switzerland) Marc Surer	Arrows-BMW	1:34.003	1:24.688	+2.985
17	28	(France) René Arnoux	Ferrari	1:36.634	1:24.848	+3.145
18	18	(Belgium) Thierry Boutsen	Arrows-BMW	1:32.530	1:25.115	+3.412
19	2	(West Germany) Manfred Winkelhock	Brabham-BMW	no time	1:25.289	+3.586
20	26	(Italy) Andrea de Cesaris	Ligier-Renault	1:33.398	1:26.082	+4.379
21	25	(France) François Hesnault	Ligier-Renault	1:34.233	1:26.701	+4.998
22	24	(Italy) Piercarlo Ghinzani	Osella-Alfa Romeo	1:31.336	1:26.840	+5.137
23	14	(Austria) Gerhard Berger	ATS-BMW	1:44.966	1:28.106	+6.403
24	30	(Austria) Jo Gartner	Osella-Alfa Romeo	1:33.540	1:28.229	+6.526
25	21	(Italy) Mauro Baldi	Spirit-Hart	1:36.483	1:29.001	+7.298
26	10	(United Kingdom) Jonathan Palmer	RAM-Hart	1:40.344	1:29.397	+7.694
27	9	(France) Philippe Alliot	RAM-Hart	1:34.839	1:30.406	+8.703

=== Race ===
Pos	No	Driver	Constructor	Tyre	Laps	Time/Retired	Grid	Points
1	7	(France) Alain Prost	McLaren-TAG	MI	70	1:41:11.753	2	9
2	8	(Austria) Niki Lauda	McLaren-TAG	MI	70	+ 13.425	11	6
3	19	(Brazil) Ayrton Senna	Toleman-Hart	MI	70	+ 20.042	3	4
4	27	(Italy) Michele Alboreto	Ferrari	G	70	+ 20.317	8	3
5	11	(Italy) Elio de Angelis	Lotus-Renault	G	70	+ 1:32.169	5	2
6	1	(Brazil) Nelson Piquet	Brabham-BMW	MI	69	+ 1 Lap	1	1
7	15	(France) Patrick Tambay	Renault	MI	69	+ 1 Lap	7	
8	22	(Italy) Riccardo Patrese	Alfa Romeo	G	69	+ 1 Lap	12	
9	28	(France) René Arnoux	Ferrari	G	69	+ 1 Lap	17	
10	2	(West Germany) Manfred Winkelhock	Brabham-BMW	MI	69	+ 1 Lap	19	
11	20	(Sweden) Stefan Johansson	Toleman-Hart	MI	69	+ 1 Lap	10	
12	26	(Italy) Andrea de Cesaris	Ligier-Renault	MI	69	+ 1 Lap	20	
13	14	(Austria) Gerhard Berger	ATS-BMW	P	68	+ 2 Laps	23	
14	5	(France) Jacques Laffite	Williams-Honda	G	67	+ 3 Laps	15	
15	21	(Italy) Mauro Baldi	Spirit-Hart	P	66	+ 4 Laps	25	
16	30	(Austria) Jo Gartner	Osella-Alfa Romeo	P	65	Out of Fuel	24	
17	23	(United States) Eddie Cheever	Alfa Romeo	G	64	+ 6 Laps	14	
Ret	24	(Italy) Piercarlo Ghinzani	Osella-Alfa Romeo	P	60	Engine	22	
Ret	12	(United Kingdom) Nigel Mansell	Lotus-Renault	G	52	Brakes	6	
Ret	16	(United Kingdom) Derek Warwick	Renault	MI	51	Gearbox	9	
Ret	33	(France) Philippe Streiff	Renault	MI	48	Transmission	13	
Ret	6	(Finland) Keke Rosberg	Williams-Honda	G	39	Engine	4	
Ret	25	(France) François Hesnault	Ligier-Renault	MI	31	Electrical	21	
Ret	18	(Belgium) Thierry Boutsen	Arrows-BMW	G	24	Transmission	18	
Ret	10	(United Kingdom) Jonathan Palmer	RAM-Hart	P	19	Gearbox	26	
Ret	17	(Switzerland) Marc Surer	Arrows-BMW	G	8	Electrical	16	
Ret	9	(France) Philippe Alliot	RAM-Hart	P	2	Engine	27	

== Championship standings after the race ==
Drivers' Championship standings

Pos	Driver	Points
1	(Austria) Niki Lauda	72
2	(France) Alain Prost	71.5
3	(Italy) Elio de Angelis	34
4	(Italy) Michele Alboreto	30.5
5	(Brazil) Nelson Piquet	29

Constructors' Championship standings

Pos	Constructor	Points
1	(United Kingdom) McLaren-TAG	143.5
2	(Italy) Ferrari	57.5
3	(United Kingdom) Lotus-Renault	47
4	(United Kingdom) Brabham-BMW	38
5	(France) Renault	34

- Note: Only the top five positions are included for both sets of standings.

Previous race: 1984 European Grand Prix	FIA Formula One World Championship; 1984 season	Next race: 1985 Brazilian Grand Prix
Previous race: 1966 Portuguese Grand Prix	Portuguese Grand Prix	Next race: 1985 Portuguese Grand Prix
