= 1985 Portuguese Grand Prix =

- Race 2 of 16 in the 1985 Formula One World Championship
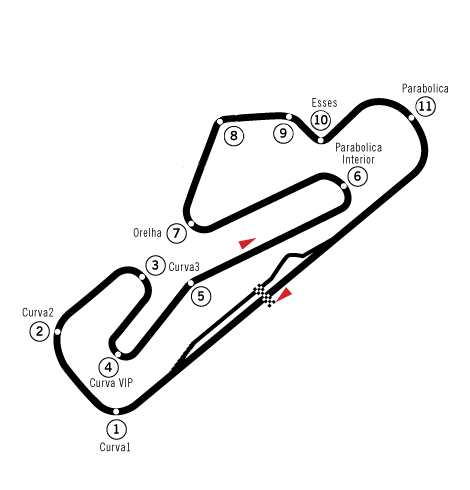

Race details
- Date: 21 April 1985
- Official name: 14º Grande Prémio de Portugal
- Location: Autódromo do Estoril, Estoril, Portugal
- Course: Permanent racing facility
- Course length: 4.35 km (2.702 miles)
- Distance: 67 laps, 291.45 km (181.034 miles)
- Scheduled distance: 70 laps, 304.5 km (189.14 miles)
- Weather: Overcast, Cold, Rain

Pole position
Driver	(Brazil) Ayrton Senna	Lotus-Renault
- Time: 1:21.007

Fastest lap
Driver	(Brazil) Ayrton Senna	Lotus-Renault
- Time: 1:44.121 on lap 15

Podium
First	(Brazil) Ayrton Senna	Lotus-Renault
Second	(Italy) Michele Alboreto	Ferrari
Third	(France) Patrick Tambay	Renault

The 1985 Portuguese Grand Prix was a Formula One motor race held in Estoril on 21 April 1985. It was the second round of the 1985 FIA Formula One World Championship and was won by Ayrton Senna from pole position, taking both his first pole position and win in the process. Senna demonstrated his proficiency in wet racing by finishing the race at least one lap ahead of every car except second-place finisher Michele Alboreto.

== Qualifying ==
Pos	No.	Driver	Constructor	Q1	Q2	Gap
1	12	(Brazil) Ayrton Senna	Lotus-Renault	1:21.708	1:21.007	—
2	2	(France) Alain Prost	McLaren-TAG	1:23.887	1:21.420	+0.413
3	6	(Finland) Keke Rosberg	Williams-Honda	15:59.178	1:21.904	+0.897
4	11	(Italy) Elio de Angelis	Lotus-Renault	1:23.306	1:22.159	+1.152
5	27	(Italy) Michele Alboreto	Ferrari	1:22.831	1:22.577	+1.570
6	16	(United Kingdom) Derek Warwick	Renault	1:24.538	1:23.084	+2.077
7	1	(Austria) Niki Lauda	McLaren-TAG	1:23.670	1:23.288	+2.281
8	25	(Italy) Andrea de Cesaris	Ligier-Renault	1:24.723	1:23.302	+2.295
9	5	(United Kingdom) Nigel Mansell	Williams-Honda	1:26.459	1:23.594	+2.587
10	7	(Brazil) Nelson Piquet	Brabham-BMW	1:25.588	1:23.618	+2.611
11	28	(Sweden) Stefan Johansson	Ferrari	1:25.136	1:23.652	+2.645
12	15	(France) Patrick Tambay	Renault	1:25.718	1:24.111	+3.104
13	22	(Italy) Riccardo Patrese	Alfa Romeo	1:24.519	1:24.230	+3.223
14	23	(United States) Eddie Cheever	Alfa Romeo	1:24.880	1:24.563	+3.556
15	9	(West Germany) Manfred Winkelhock	RAM-Hart	1:34.876	1:24.721	+3.714
16	18	(Belgium) Thierry Boutsen	Arrows-BMW	1:24.747	1:26.695	+3.740
17	17	(Austria) Gerhard Berger	Arrows-BMW	1:26.154	1:24.842	+3.835
18	26	(France) Jacques Laffite	Ligier-Renault	1:24.943	1:26.181	+3.936
19	8	(France) François Hesnault	Brabham-BMW	14:46.042	1:25.717	+4.710
20	10	(France) Philippe Alliot	RAM-Hart	1:27.430	1:26.186	+5.179
21	4	(West Germany) Stefan Bellof	Tyrrell-Ford	1:27.284	1:27.474	+6.277
22	3	(United Kingdom) Martin Brundle	Tyrrell-Ford	1:28.694	1:27.602	+6.595
23	30	(United Kingdom) Jonathan Palmer	Zakspeed	1:28.166		+7.159
24	21	(Italy) Mauro Baldi	Spirit-Hart	1:30.231	1:28.473	+7.466
25	29	(Italy) Pierluigi Martini	Minardi-Ford	1:31.205	1:28.596	+7.589
26	24	(Italy) Piercarlo Ghinzani	Osella-Alfa Romeo	1:30.855		+9.848

Source: ChicaneF1.com.

== Race ==
Jonathan Palmer was the first driver to retire and was able to bring his Zakspeed into the pits and retire with suspension problems. Wet weather caused spinouts frequently early in the race. Philippe Alliot retired trackside for this reason on lap 3. François Hesnault retired trackside with an electrical problem on the same lap.

On lap 4, Riccardo Patrese made contact with Stefan Johansson while attempting to pass him on the inside line. Running 10th and 11th at the time, both cars were spun out into a gravel trap by the contact. Patrese was beached, and Johansson was able to rejoin the race after a delay, several positions down. Soon after, Stefan Bellof and Manfred Winkelhock made contact on track; both were able to restart their cars and rejoin the race. Numerous other small offs and spinoffs continued through the wet conditions.

By lap 10, Ayrton Senna had pulled away from 2nd position by almost 13 seconds. Elio de Angelis, Alain Prost, and Michele Alboreto (in order) were closely contending second position, and Derek Warwick was 15 seconds behind them in 5th. Gerhard Berger and Pierluigi Martini both spun off and retired on lap 12. The top four held steady to lap 15, with Niki Lauda and Patrick Tambay in 5th and 6th, 25 seconds behind 4th place Alboreto. Keke Rosberg spun his car on track on lap 16, and it came to rest in the middle of the track, causing a local yellow. Rosberg's car was not immediately cleared and remained on track in the same position for numerous laps.

At 20 laps, Senna had extended his lead on his teammate de Angelis to 30 seconds, with Prost and Alboreto still close behind. The two Renaults of Tambay and Warwick were more than a minute behind Senna in 6th and 7th. Only 9 cars remained on the lead lap. Nelson Piquet pitted repeatedly around lap 25, finally retiring with a tyre issue. Rain, which was already falling at the start of the race, continued and got heavier. Near lap 30, Mauro Baldi spun out and ended on track with damage to his car and leaving a lot of mud on the racing surface, and Alain Prost retired with damage after spinning and striking the rear of his car on the track barrier. Still in the lead, Ayrton Senna signaled to race officials along pit lane asking them to stop the race. The race was not stopped or interrupted, but did continue at an unusually slow pace because of the poor weather conditions.

The 1985 Portuguese Grand Prix was originally scheduled for 70 laps. At the beginning of lap 67, race leader Ayrton Senna was given a "one lap to go" indication from the race director, as the race had exceeded the prescribed two-hour time limit. Senna crossed the line, having led every lap of the race, and with only one other car on the lead lap, that of second-place Michele Alboreto. Patrick Tambay and Elio de Angelis, both one lap down, took third and fourth. Nigel Mansell and Stefan Bellof took the final points-paying positions, two laps down.

Senna's win was his first of two in the 1985 Formula One season, and the first of what would be 41 Formula One Grand Prix victories.

=== Race classification ===
Pos	No.	Driver	Constructor	Tyre	Laps	Time/retired	Grid	Points
1	12	(Brazil) Ayrton Senna	Lotus-Renault	G	67	2:00:28.006	1	9
2	27	(Italy) Michele Alboreto	Ferrari	G	67	+ 1:02.978	5	6
3	15	(France) Patrick Tambay	Renault	G	66	+ 1 lap	12	4
4	11	(Italy) Elio de Angelis	Lotus-Renault	G	66	+ 1 lap	4	3
5	5	(United Kingdom) Nigel Mansell	Williams-Honda	G	65	+ 2 laps	9	2
6	4	(West Germany) Stefan Bellof	Tyrrell-Ford	G	65	+ 2 laps	21	1
7	16	(United Kingdom) Derek Warwick	Renault	G	65	+ 2 laps	6	
8	28	(Sweden) Stefan Johansson	Ferrari	G	62	+ 5 laps	11	
9	24	(Italy) Piercarlo Ghinzani	Osella-Alfa Romeo	P	61	+ 6 laps	26	
NC	9	(West Germany) Manfred Winkelhock	RAM-Hart	P	50	+ 17 laps	15	
Ret	1	(Austria) Niki Lauda	McLaren-TAG	G	49	Engine	7	
Ret	23	(United States) Eddie Cheever	Alfa Romeo	G	36	Engine	14	
Ret	2	(France) Alain Prost	McLaren-TAG	G	30	Spun Off	2	
Ret	25	(Italy) Andrea de Cesaris	Ligier-Renault	P	29	Tyre	8	
Ret	7	(Brazil) Nelson Piquet	Brabham-BMW	P	28	Tyre	16	
Ret	18	(Belgium) Thierry Boutsen	Arrows-BMW	G	28	Electrical	10	
Ret	3	(United Kingdom) Martin Brundle	Tyrrell-Ford	G	20	Transmission	22	
Ret	21	(Italy) Mauro Baldi	Spirit-Hart	P	19	Spun off	24	
Ret	6	(Finland) Keke Rosberg	Williams-Honda	G	16	Spun off	3	
Ret	26	(France) Jacques Laffite	Ligier-Renault	P	15	Tyre	18	
Ret	17	(Austria) Gerhard Berger	Arrows-BMW	G	12	Spun off	17	
Ret	29	(Italy) Pierluigi Martini	Minardi-Ford	P	12	Spun off	25	
Ret	22	(Italy) Riccardo Patrese	Alfa Romeo	G	4	Spun off	13	
Ret	10	(France) Philippe Alliot	RAM-Hart	P	3	Spun off	20	
Ret	8	(France) François Hesnault	Brabham-BMW	P	3	Electrical	19	
Ret	30	(United Kingdom) Jonathan Palmer	Zakspeed	G	2	Suspension	23	

Sources: Formula1.com, GP Archive.

== Championship standings after the race ==
Drivers' Championship standings

Pos	Driver	Points
1	(Italy) Michele Alboreto	12
2	(France) Alain Prost	9
3	(Brazil) Ayrton Senna	9
4	(Italy) Elio de Angelis	7
5	(France) Patrick Tambay	6

Constructors' Championship standings

Pos	Constructor	Points
1	(United Kingdom) Lotus-Renault	16
2	(Italy) Ferrari	15
3	(United Kingdom) McLaren-TAG	9
4	(France) Renault	6
5	(United Kingdom) Williams-Honda	2

- Note: Only the top five positions are included for both sets of standings.

Previous race: 1985 Brazilian Grand Prix	FIA Formula One World Championship; 1985 season	Next race: 1985 San Marino Grand Prix
Previous race: 1984 Portuguese Grand Prix	Portuguese Grand Prix	Next race: 1986 Portuguese Grand Prix
