= Claude Galopin =

French automotive engineer

Claude Galopin is a French automotive engineer.

== Career ==
In 1984, Galopin was recruited by the Ligier Formula One team as a race engineer, a position he remained in for four years. He then stepped down to International Formula 3000 to work for the GBDA Motorsport team, whose driver Olivier Grouillard finished second in the 1988 Drivers' Championship. GBDA folded at the end of the season, and Galopin was recruited by the AGS F1 team for 1989, where he took the position on chief engineer.

Galopin returned to Ligier for 1990 as Philippe Alliot's race engineer. He designed the 1991 Ligier JS35 chassis with Richard Divila, but the car's performance was disappointing and he was summarily fired by team owner Guy Ligier. For 1992 he returned to Formula 3000 with the DAMS team—which, like GBDA, was part owned by former driver René Arnoux—where he engineered Olivier Panis and Jean-Christophe Boullion to the 1993 and 1994 championships. Galopin worked for DAMS until 2002, during which time he also designed the team's unraced GD-01 chassis intended for F1, before moving to Pescarolo Sport.
