= Spirit 101 =

Spirit 101 Spirit 101D
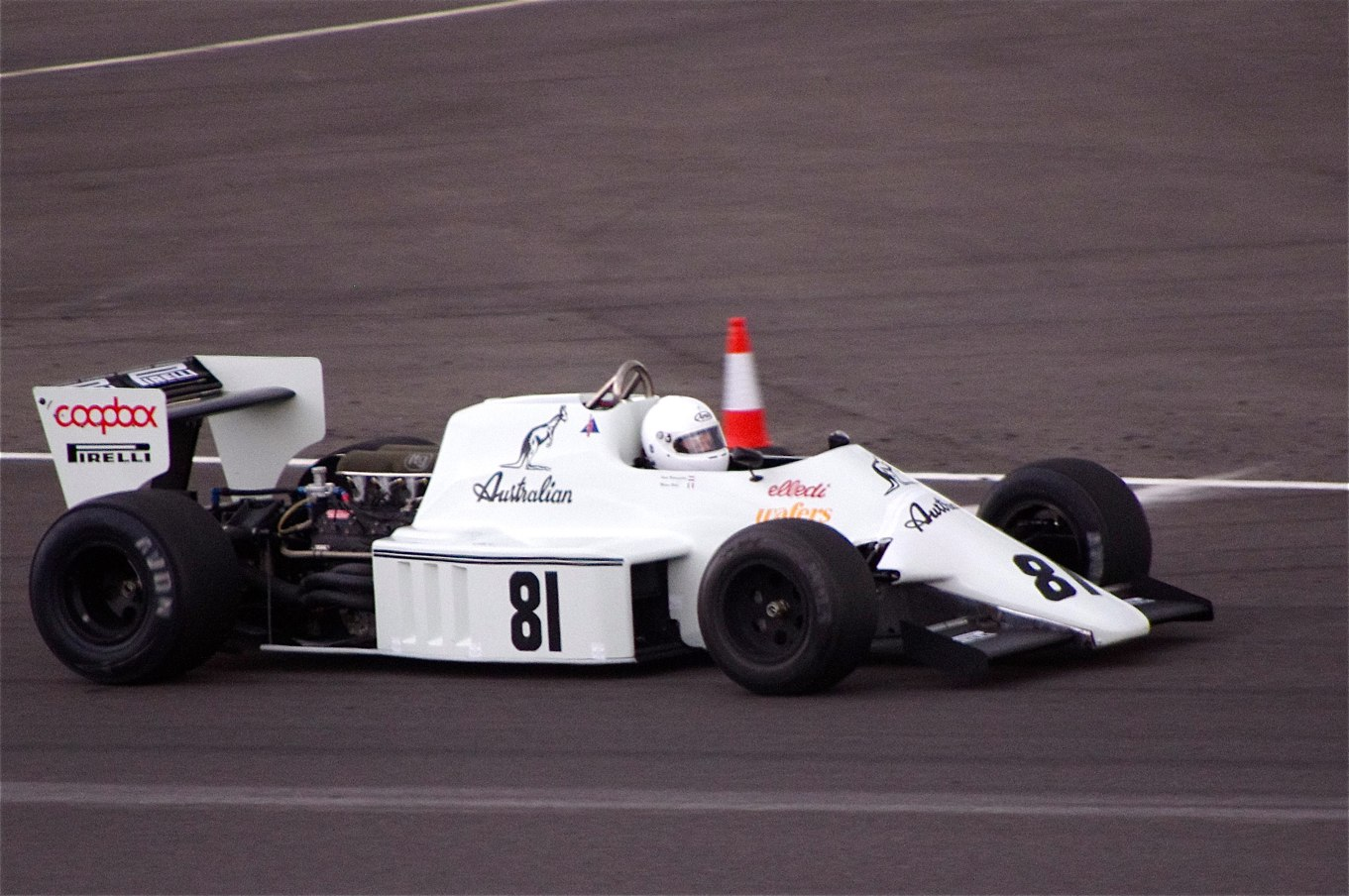
- Category: Formula One
- Constructor: Spirit
- Designers: Gordon Coppuck; Tim Wright
- Predecessor: Spirit 201C

Technical specifications
- Chassis: Aluminium alloy monocoque
- Suspension (front): Double wishbones, coil springs
- Suspension (rear): Double wishbones, coil springs
- Engine: 1984-1985: Hart 415T, Straight 4, 1,459 cc (89.0 cu in), turbo, mid-engine, longitudinally mounted. 1984: Ford Cosworth DFV, 2,993 cc (182.6 cu in), V8 naturally aspirated, mid-mounted.
- Transmission: Hewland FGB 6-speed manual
- Weight: 540 kg (1,190 lb)
- Fuel: Shell
- Tyres: Pirelli

Competition history
- Notable entrants: Spirit Racing; Spirit Enterprises Ltd
- Notable drivers: (Italy) Mauro Baldi (Netherlands) Huub Rothengatter
- Debut: 1984 Brazilian Grand Prix
| Races | Wins | Poles | F/Laps |
|---|---|---|---|
| 19 | 0 | 0 | 0 |
- Constructors' Championships: 0
- Drivers' Championships: 0
- Unless otherwise stated, all data refer to Formula One World Championship Grands Prix only.

The Spirit 101 was a Formula One car for the 1984 and 1985 Formula One seasons. The car was designed by Gordon Coppuck and Tim Wright.

== Development ==
Having competed in the 1983 season using the Spirit 201 chassis and Honda RA163E turbocharged engine, Spirit decided to continue in Formula One for 1984 with Hart turbocharged engines. Initially, twice world champion Emerson Fittipaldi and Italian Fulvio Ballabio were slated to drive, with funding from Ballabio's sponsors. However Fittipaldi left to find a drive in Indy car racing after finding the machine uncompetitive and Ballabio was refused an FIA Super Licence. Instead, Italian Mauro Baldi found funds and was nominated as the team's sole driver, with Stefan Johansson being released as he could not find the funding to continue. The 101 was a neat but underpowered car and Baldi struggled to move away from the rear of the grid. Jean-Louis Schlesser had planned to take over from the third race before the threat of litigation from RAM Racing, as he still owed them money.

== Racing History ==
=== 1983 ===
The first version of the car was presented largely incomplete at the Italian Grand Prix and didn't race during the season.

=== 1984 ===
In 1984, the first chassis was adapted to house the Hart 415T engine and become the "101B", featuring new sidepods. Later, a newly built and improved chassis debuted at the 1984 San Marino Grand Prix. The original chassis was then modified again as the "101C" to use the Ford Cosworth DFV (the third engine type to be used in few months), fitted with the previous year's side pods. After the Detroit Grand Prix, it would be refitted with Hart engines to be used as the T-Car.

The 101B debuted at the 1984 Brazilian Grand Prix and Baldi retired with a broken distributor. At the South African Grand Prix, the Italian finished eighth.

The Belgian Grand Prix saw Baldi retire with broken suspension and at the San Marino the Italian finished eighth. The French Grand Prix saw Baldi retire with engine failure.

The Italian failed to qualify for the Monaco.

Baldi was replaced by Dutchman Huub Rothengatter for the Canadian Grand Prix, who finished the race fourteen laps down and was not classified.

At the Detroit Grand Prix, the Hart Engine was replaced by the Ford Cosworth DFV, but Rothengatter failed to qualify. Rothengatter retired from the Dallas Grand Prix with a Fuel Leak. At the British Grand Prix, the Dutchman was nine laps down and was not classified. The German Grand Prix saw Rothengatter finish ninth. At the Austrian Grand Prix, the Dutchman finished the race twenty eight laps down and was not classified.

Rothengatter retired from the Dutch Grand Prix on lap 56 with throttle problems. He started 27th and last at Zandvoort with FISA making an exception and allowing an extra starter over the usual 26 due to the season disqualification of the Tyrrell team. It was rumored that this inclusion was to have a local in the race in an effort to boost attendance, even though Rothengatter was 7.496 seconds slower than the pole winning McLaren-TAG turbo of Alain Prost and 0.793 slower than the RAM-Hart of 26th placed qualifier Philippe Alliot. For the race, the Spirit-Hart was painted in Dutch racing Orange. Rothengatter then finished ninth at Italy.

Baldi replaced Rothengatter for the final two races: the European Grand Prix saw Baldi finish eighth and 15th in Portugal.

The Spirit team had scored no World Championship points during the year.

=== 1985 ===
The 101-02 chassis, having been progressively upgraded throughout 1984, was again updated into the Spirit 101D for 1985 and Baldi continued to drive. The first race of 1985 was the 1985 Brazilian Grand Prix and Baldi retired because of a broken turbocharger. The Italian spun off and retired at Portugal. The San Marino Grand Prix saw Baldi retire because of an electrical fault. Allen Berg had arranged a deal to take over the seat later in the season. Due to ongoing financial difficulties, John Wickham, the co-founder of Spirit, accepted an offer from Toleman to buy out the team's tyre contract and folded the F1 outfit after just three rounds.

The Spirit team had scored no World Championship points during the year.

== Complete Formula One World Championship results ==
(key)

| Year | Entrants | Chassis | Engines | Tyres | Drivers | 1 | 2 | 3 | 4 | 5 | 6 | 7 | 8 | 9 | 10 | 11 | 12 | 13 | 14 | 15 | 16 | Points | WCC |
|---|---|---|---|---|---|---|---|---|---|---|---|---|---|---|---|---|---|---|---|---|---|---|---|
| 1984 | Spirit Racing | 101 | Hart 415T S4 (t/c) | P | | BRA | RSA | BEL | SMR | FRA | MON | CAN | DET | DAL | GBR | GER | AUT | NED | ITA | EUR | POR | 0 | NC |
| 1984 | Spirit Racing | 101 | Hart 415T S4 (t/c) | P | Mauro Baldi | Ret | 8 | Ret | 8 | Ret | DNQ | | | | | | | | | 8 | 15 | 0 | NC |
| 1984 | Spirit Racing | 101 | Hart 415T S4 (t/c) | P | Huub Rothengatter | | | | | | | NC | | Ret | NC | 9 | NC | Ret | 8 | | | 0 | NC |
| 1984 | Spirit Racing | 101C | Ford Cosworth DFV V8 | P | Huub Rothengatter | | | | | | | | DNQ | | | | | | | | | 0 | NC |
| 1985 | Spirit Enterprises Ltd | 101D | Hart 415T S4 (t/c) | P | | BRA | POR | SMR | MON | CAN | DET | FRA | GBR | GER | AUT | NED | ITA | BEL | EUR | RSA | AUS | 0 | NC |
| 1985 | Spirit Enterprises Ltd | 101D | Hart 415T S4 (t/c) | P | Mauro Baldi | Ret | Ret | Ret | | | | | | | | | | | | | | 0 | NC |
