= RAM 02 =

Formula One car

- Category: Formula One
- Constructor: RAM Racing
- Designer(s): Dave Kelly; Sergio Rinland

Technical specifications
- Chassis: Carbon fiber Honeycomb monocoque
- Suspension (front): Double wishbones, pull-rod-actuated coil springs and dampers, anti-roll bar
- Suspension (rear): Double wishbones, pull-rod-actuated coil springs and dampers, anti-roll bar
- Axle track: 1,753 mm (69.0 in) (front); 1,607 mm (63.3 in) (rear)
- Wheelbase: 2,769 mm (109.0 in)
- Engine: Hart 1,496 cc (91.3 cu in) L4 turbocharged mid-mounted
- Transmission: Hewland FGB 400 5-speed manual.
- Power: 600 hp (450 kW)
- Weight: 550 kg (1,210 lb)
- Fuel: Shell
- Tyres: Pirelli

Competition history
- Notable drivers: Philippe Alliot; Jonathan Palmer; Mike Thackwell
- Debut: 1984 Brazilian Grand Prix
Races	Wins	Poles	F/Laps
16	0	0	0

The RAM 02 was an open-wheel Formula One race car, designed, developed, and built by British team and constructor RAM in 1984.

== Complete Formula One results ==
(key)

Year	Entrant	Engine	Tyres	Driver	1	2	3	4	5	6	7	8	9	10	11	12	13	14	15	16	Pts.	WCC
1984	RAM Racing	Hart; L4 turbo	Pirelli		BRA	RSA	BEL	SMR	FRA	MON	CAN	DET	DAL	GBR	GER	AUT	NED	ITA	EUR	POR	0	-
1984	RAM Racing	Hart; L4 turbo	Pirelli	Philippe Alliot	Ret	Ret	DNQ	Ret	Ret	DNQ	10	Ret	DNS	Ret	Ret	11	10	Ret	Ret	Ret	0	-
1984	RAM Racing	Hart; L4 turbo	Pirelli	Jonathan Palmer			10	9	13	DNQ		Ret	Ret	Ret	Ret	9	9	Ret	Ret	Ret	0	-
1984	RAM Racing	Hart; L4 turbo	Pirelli	Mike Thackwell							Ret										0	-
