= Corrado Fabi =

Italian racing driver (born 1961)

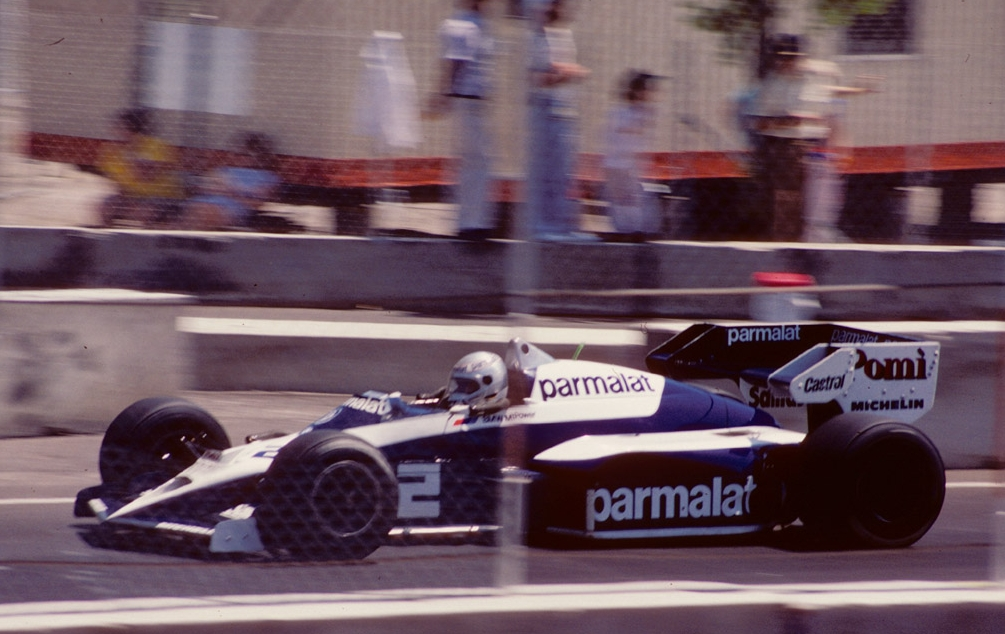
- Corrado Fabi substituting for his brother Teo at the 1984 Dallas Grand Prix
- Born: 12 April 1961 (age 65); Milan, Italy

Formula One World Championship career
- Nationality: (Italy) Italian
- Active years: 1983–1984
- Team(s): Osella, Brabham
- Entries: 18 (12 starts)
- Championships: 0
- Wins: 0
- Podiums: 0
- Career points: 0
- Pole positions: 0
- Fastest laps: 0
- First entry: 1983 Brazilian Grand Prix
- Last entry: 1984 Dallas Grand Prix

Corrado Fabi (born 12 April 1961) is a former racing driver from Italy. He participated in 18 Formula One Grands Prix, debuting on 13 March 1983, scoring no championship points. He is the younger brother of Teo Fabi, also a racing driver.

== Career ==
Fabi was born in Milan. He took up karting as a teenager, driving for the Birel Team. In 1979, age 18, he made his debut in Formula Three. In 1980, he partnered Michele Alboreto in the Euroracing European F3 team, finishing third in the championship. In 1981, Fabi graduated to Formula Two and in 1982 he won the championship driving a March-BMW.

In 1983, Fabi made his debut in Formula One with Osella at the Brazilian Grand Prix. Despite the car's lack of competitiveness, which marred his season, Fabi was able to show form, regularly outqualifying his teammate Piercarlo Ghinzani. In 1984, he shared a Brabham Formula One drive with his brother Teo, deputising for him when Teo's commitments to CART racing in the USA took precedence. After his opportunities in Formula One dried up, Corrado Fabi raced briefly in CART before retiring to look after the family business.

== Racing record ==
=== Career summary ===
Season	Series	Team	Races	Wins	Poles	F/Laps	Podiums	Points	Position
1979	Italian Formula Three		?	?	?	?	?	8	11th
1980	European Formula Three	Euroracing	14	2	1	5	7	50	**3rd**
1980	Italian Formula Three	Euroracing	2	0	0	0	1	23	4th
1980	Vandervell British Formula Three	Euroracing	?	?	?	?	?	1	14th
1981	European Formula Two	Roloil Marlboro Racing	12	1	2	2	4	29	5th
1981	World Sportscar Championship	BMW Italia	1	0	0	0	0	15	182nd
1982	European Formula Two	Roloil Racing	13	5	2	3	7	57	**1st**
1982	World Sportscar Championship	Martini Racing	1	0	0	0	1	16	18th
1983	Formula One	Osella Squadra Corse	9	0	0	0	0	0	NC
1984	CART PPG Indy Car World Series	Forsythe Racing	4	0	0	0	0	11	28th
1984	Formula One	MRD International	3	0	0	0	0	0	NC
1987	International Formula 3000	Genoa Racing	1	0	0	0	0	0	NC

=== Complete European Formula Two Championship results ===
(key) (Races in bold indicate pole position; races in italics indicate fastest lap)

Year	Entrant	Chassis	Engine	1	2	3	4	5	6	7	8	9	10	11	12	13	Pos.	Pts
1981	Roloil Marlboro Racing	March 812	BMW	SIL; 3	HOC; Ret	THR; Ret	**NÜR**; 3	VLL; 4	MUG; 1	PAU; Ret	PER; Ret	SPA; 4	DON; 2	MIS; Ret	**MAN**; 7		5th	29
1982	Roloil Racing	March 822	BMW	SIL; Ret	HOC; 3	THR; Ret	NÜR; 2	MUG; 1	VLL; 1	PAU; Ret	SPA; 5	HOC; 1	DON; 1	**MAN**; Ret	PER; Ret	**MIS**; 1	**1st**	**57**

=== Complete Formula One World Championship results ===
(key)

Year	Entrant	Chassis	Engine	1	2	3	4	5	6	7	8	9	10	11	12	13	14	15	16	WDC	Pts
1983	Osella Squadra Corse	Osella FA1D	Ford Cosworth DFV 3.0 V8	BRA; Ret	USW; DNQ	FRA; Ret	SMR; Ret	MON; DNQ	BEL; Ret	DET; DNQ	CAN; Ret									NC	0
1983	Osella Squadra Corse	Osella FA1E	Alfa Romeo 1260 3.0 V12									GBR; DNQ	GER; DNQ	AUT; 10	NED; 11	ITA; Ret	EUR; DNQ	RSA; Ret		NC	0
1984	MRD International	Brabham BT53	BMW M12/13 1.5 L4t	BRA	RSA	BEL	SMR	FRA	MON; Ret	CAN; Ret	DET	DAL; 7	GBR	GER	AUT	NED	ITA	EUR	POR	NC	0

=== American Open-Wheel racing ===
(key) (Races in bold indicate pole position)

==== CART PPG Indy Car World Series ====
Year	Team	No.	Chassis	Engine	1	2	3	4	5	6	7	8	9	10	11	12	13	14	15	16	Pos.	Pts	Ref
1984	Forsythe Racing	33	Lola T800	Cosworth DFX V8t	LBH	PHX	INDY	MIL	POR	MEA	CLE	MCH	ROA	POC	MDO; 25	SAN; 10	MCH	PHX; 6	LAG	CPL; 25	28th	11	

=== Complete International Formula 3000 results ===
(key) (Races in bold indicate pole position; races in italics indicate fastest lap.)

Year	Entrant	Chassis	Engine	1	2	3	4	5	6	7	8	9	10	11	Pos.	Pts
1987	Genoa Racing	March 87B	Cosworth	SIL	VLL	SPA	PAU	DON; Ret	PER; DNQ	BRH	BIR	IMO	BUG; DNQ	JAR	NC	0

Sporting positions
Preceded by Geoff Lees	European Formula Two; Champion; 1982	Succeeded by Jonathan Palmer
