= Jo Gartner =

Austrian racing driver (1954–1986)

- Born: Josef Anton Gartner; 24 January 1954; Vienna, Austria
- Died: 1 June 1986 (aged 32); Circuit de la Sarthe, Le Mans, France

Formula One World Championship career
- Nationality: (Austria) Austrian
- Active years: 1984
- Team: Osella
- Entries: 8
- Championships: 0
- Wins: 0
- Podiums: 0
- Career points: 0
- Pole positions: 0
- Fastest laps: 0
- First entry: 1984 San Marino Grand Prix
- Last entry: 1984 Portuguese Grand Prix

Josef Anton Gartner (24 January 1954 – 1 June 1986) was a Formula One and sports car endurance driver from Austria. After a successful lower formula career, including a win in the Formula Two Pau Grand Prix, he participated in eight Formula One Grands Prix for Osella during the 1984 season, scoring no points. He was killed in an accident at the 1986 24 Hours of Le Mans.

== Career ==
=== Early career ===
Gartner was born in Vienna. In 1972, he began working for the Kaimann Formula Super Vee team in a technical capacity. After buying, modifying and selling a Formula Vee chassis of his own, Gartner began his motor sport career in some hillclimbing events in 1976. In 1977, aged 23, he started competing more seriously, driving in the Volkswagen-supported European Formula Super Vee championship. The following season, he finished third in the championship.

Gartner moved up to the European Formula Three Championship in 1979, driving a Martini with support from Renault, and switched to Formula Two in 1980 with a two-year-old March. On his Formula Two debut, Gartner's car was damaged by debris from the accident that killed his countryman Markus Höttinger. He was subsequently invited to take Höttinger's place in the BMW M1 Procar Championship series, in which he raced against Formula One drivers, driving for fellow Austrian Helmut Marko.

In 1981, Gartner drove a year-old Toleman TG280 at selected races and picked up a point with sixth place at the Enna-Pergusa round. He finished the season with two races for the Merzario team, finishing eighth at Mantorp Park. Continuing with Merzario for 1982, Gartner picked up his only point of the season with sixth at the opening round at Silverstone, but the car was generally uncompetitive in a strong field.

For 1983, Gartner decided to return to running his own car, an ex-works Spirit 201. After a fourth place at Hockenheim, he won the Pau Grand Prix when the first driver across the line, Alain Ferté, was disqualified because his car was underweight. This win enabled Gartner to gain the necessary sponsorship for a move to Formula One.

=== Formula One ===
In 1984, Gartner had secured the part-time second seat with the struggling Italian Osella team, as teammate to Piercarlo Ghinzani, driving a year-old, non-turbo FA1E. He qualified on his debut at the 1984 San Marino Grand Prix, but his race ended with an engine failure. At his next race, Gartner was given the new turbocharged Osella FA1F as the team decided to run a second car at all the remaining races. At the 1984 British Grand Prix, Gartner was allowed to start in 27th position because the Tyrrell Racing team was participating under appeal. However, his race ended when he was unable to avoid a first-lap accident involving Philippe Alliot and Eddie Cheever. After mechanical failures in the next two races, he finished 12th at the Dutch Grand Prix, five laps down on the winner Alain Prost.

At the Italian Grand Prix at Monza, Gartner qualified 24th but finished fifth, beating fellow Austrian Gerhard Berger into sixth after Ghinzani and Cheever ran out of fuel. However, Gartner was denied the two points normally awarded to the fifth-place finisher, as Osella had only entered one car at the beginning of the season. Berger in sixth was similarly denied his single point, driving for ATS.

Classified 12th at the European Grand Prix although he retired with fuel injection problems, Gartner closed the season with a 16th place classification in Portugal, having run out of fuel. For 1985, he was in contention for a seat at Arrows, but lost out to Berger. He also held talks with Toleman and Osella, but both seats went to drivers with more finance in place.

=== Endurance racing and death ===
Gartner had finished fourth in the 1985 24 Hours of Le Mans in a Porsche 962C along with teammates David Hobbs and Guy Edwards. In 1985, after his season in Formula One, he joined the Fitzpatrick Porsche Group C endurance racing team, driving a Porsche 956, and also campaigned a Porsche 962 for Bob Akin in the IMSA GT Championship. He won the 1986 12 Hours of Sebring, along with teammates Akin and Hans-Joachim Stuck, finishing on three wheels, and also won an international race at Thruxton with Tiff Needell. Gartner was aiming to join the factory Rothman's Porsche team for 1987.

Whilst contesting the 1986 24 Hours of Le Mans for Kremer Racing with teammates Sarel van der Merwe and Kunimitsu Takahashi, Gartner's Porsche 962 suffered a mechanical failure at 2:10 am on the Sunday morning, and turned hard left into the barriers on the Mulsanne Straight at 160 mph (260 km/h). The car somersaulted down the track, hit a telephone pole, crashed into trees and then caught fire after it came to a rest on top of the barriers on the opposite side of the track. The accident took out 100 meters of guardrail and debris was strewn over 200 meters. Gartner was killed on impact, due to a broken neck. Although the cause of the accident was never determined, two marshals saw Gartner brake on the straight before the car veered off into the barriers, which suggests a problem with the manual gearbox. Gartner was the last fatality at the Le Mans 24 Hours under race conditions until Allan Simonsen was killed in the 2013 race.

== Racing record ==
=== Complete European Formula Two Championship results ===
(key)

Year	Entrant	Chassis	Engine	1	2	3	4	5	6	7	8	9	10	11	12	13	Pos.	Pts
1980	Racing Team Albatross	March 782	BMW	THR	HOC; 13	NÜR	VLL	PAU									NC	0
1980	Team Jim Bean	March 782	BMW						SIL; 7	ZOL	MUG; 12	ZAN; 11	PER	MIS	HOC; Ret		NC	0
1981	Jo Gartner Racing	Toleman TG280	BMW	SIL	HOC	THR	NÜR; 7	VLL	MUG; 9	PAU	PER; 6	SPA; Ret	DON; Ret				19th	1
1981	Astra Team Merzario Srl	March 812	BMW											MIS; DNQ	MAN; 8		19th	1
1982	Merzario Team	Merzario 282	BMW	SIL; 6	HOC; Ret	THR; 10	NÜR; Ret	MUG; Ret	VLL; 7	PAU; Ret	SPA; 15	HOC; 7	DON; Ret	MAN; Ret	PER	MIS	17th	1
1983	Emco Sports	Spirit 201	BMW	SIL; Ret	THR; Ret	HOC; 4	NÜR; Ret	VLL; Ret	PAU; 1	JAR; 17	DON; Ret	MIS; Ret	PER; 5	ZOL; Ret	MUG; 7		6th	14
1984	Emco Sports	Spirit 201B	BMW	SIL; Ret	HOC; Ret	THR	VLL	MUG	PAU	HOC	MIS	PER	DON	BRH			NC	0

=== Complete Formula One results ===
(key)

Year	Entrant	Chassis	Engine	1	2	3	4	5	6	7	8	9	10	11	12	13	14	15	16	WDC	Pts
1984	Osella Squadra Corse	Osella FA1E	Alfa Romeo 1260 3.0 V12	BRA	RSA	BEL	SMR; Ret	FRA	MON	CAN	DET	DAL								NC	0
1984	Osella Squadra Corse	Osella FA1F	Alfa Romeo 890T 1.5 V8t										GBR; Ret	GER; Ret	AUT; Ret	NED; 12	ITA; 5^{1}	EUR; Ret	POR; 16	NC	0

Notes

- ^1 – Gartner was driving his team's "second entry", and as the team had only entered one car for the entire championship, the second entry was ineligible to score championship points.

=== 24 Hours of Le Mans results ===
Year	Team	Co-Drivers	Car	Class	Laps	Pos.	Class Pos.
1985	(United Kingdom) John Fitzpatrick Racing	(United Kingdom) David Hobbs (United Kingdom) Guy Edwards	Porsche 956B	C1	366	4th	4th
1986	(Germany) Porsche Kremer Racing	(South Africa) Sarel van der Merwe (Japan) Kunimitsu Takahashi	Porsche 962C	C1	169	DNF	DNF
