= 1983 Italian Grand Prix =

- Race 13 of 15 in the 1983 Formula One World Championship
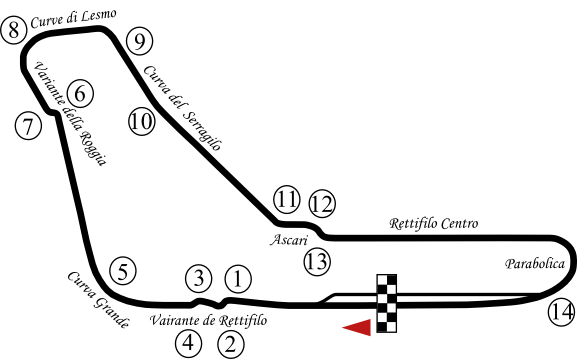

Race details
- Date: 11 September 1983
- Official name: LIV Gran Premio d'Italia
- Location: Autodromo Nazionale di Monza, Monza
- Course: Permanent racing facility
- Course length: 5.800 km (3.60 miles)
- Distance: 52 laps, 301.600 km (187.400 miles)
- Weather: Dry

Pole position
| Driver | (Italy) Riccardo Patrese | Brabham-BMW |
- Time: 1:29.122

Fastest lap
| Driver | (Brazil) Nelson Piquet | Brabham-BMW |
- Time: 1:34.431 on lap 20

Podium
| First | (Brazil) Nelson Piquet | Brabham-BMW |
| Second | (France) René Arnoux | Ferrari |
| Third | (United States) Eddie Cheever | Renault |

The 1983 Italian Grand Prix was a Formula One motor race held at Monza on 11 September 1983. It was the thirteenth race of the 1983 Formula One World Championship.

== Qualifying ==
During qualifying, Nelson Piquet pushed his Brabham BMW turbo to 305.7 km/h (190 mph) through the Monza speed trap just before the Vairante de Retiffilo chicane, though even this only resulted in 4th place on the grid. Only his Brabham teammate and pole winner Riccardo Patrese, and the McLaren TAG-Porsche turbo's of Niki Lauda (12th) and John Watson (15th) joined him above the 300 km/h (186 mph) mark. Next up through the speed trap came (in order) the Ferrari's of Patrick Tambay (2nd) and René Arnoux (3rd), the Renault's of Alain Prost (5th) and Eddie Cheever (7th), the Renault turbo powered Lotus of Elio de Angelis (8th) and the Spirit Honda turbo of Stefan Johansson (17th)

Completing the top 10 were Andrea de Cesaris 6th in his Alfa Romeo, Manfred Winkelhock 9th in his ATS BMW and Mauro Baldi 10th in the second of the Alfa Romeo V8 turbo's.

At this power circuit, the fastest of the 3.0L, naturally aspirated V8 Cosworth DFY runners was reigning World Champion Keke Rosberg in his Williams who could only manage 16th on the 26 car grid. Rosberg's time was 6.169 seconds slower than Patrese's pole time in his Brabham whose turbo BMW engine which was putting out approximately 850 bhp (630 kW) in qualifying compared to about 540 bhp (400 kW) for the non-turbocharged Ford-Cosworth. 0158-4138

== Race ==
The 52-lap race was won by Nelson Piquet, with René Arnoux second in his Ferrari and Eddie Cheever third in his factory Renault. Drivers' Championship leader Alain Prost retired with turbo failure while on his 27th lap, allowing Piquet and Arnoux to close to within five and two points of him respectively in the championship.

The race saw the occurrence of an unusual incident in the pit lane. After completing a pit stop, Lauda's McLaren stalled in front of the Brabham garage. The Brabham crew, who were preparing for Piquet's mid-race fuel and tyre stop, were joined by Brabham team owner and FOCA chief executive Bernie Ecclestone in giving Lauda a push start, to get him back into the race and to clear the area for Piquet. However, the Austrian driver retired shortly after with an electrical failure.

Another incident occurred at the end of the race, when the tifosi ran onto the track to celebrate Arnoux's second place with the cars still going round. Nigel Mansell, running seventh in his Lotus-Renault, slowed down to avoid running over any of the spectators, only to be overtaken by Bruno Giacomelli's Toleman-Hart. Infuriated, Mansell drove the wrong way into the pit lane.

== Classification ==
=== Qualifying ===
| Pos | No | Driver | Constructor | Q1 | Q2 | Gap |
|---|---|---|---|---|---|---|
| 1 | 6 | (Italy) Riccardo Patrese | Brabham-BMW | 1:30.253 | 1:29.122 | — |
| 2 | 27 | (France) Patrick Tambay | Ferrari | 1:31.036 | 1:29.650 | +0.528 |
| 3 | 28 | (France) René Arnoux | Ferrari | 1:30.799 | 1:29.901 | +0.779 |
| 4 | 5 | (Brazil) Nelson Piquet | Brabham-BMW | 1:30.202 | 1:30.475 | +1.080 |
| 5 | 15 | (France) Alain Prost | Renault | 1:32.244 | 1:31.144 | +2.022 |
| 6 | 22 | (Italy) Andrea de Cesaris | Alfa Romeo | 1:31.295 | 1:31.272 | +2.150 |
| 7 | 16 | (United States) Eddie Cheever | Renault | 1:31.613 | 1:31.564 | +2.442 |
| 8 | 11 | (Italy) Elio de Angelis | Lotus-Renault | 1:32.590 | 1:31.628 | +2.506 |
| 9 | 9 | (West Germany) Manfred Winkelhock | ATS-BMW | 1:34.161 | 1:31.959 | +2.837 |
| 10 | 23 | (Italy) Mauro Baldi | Alfa Romeo | 1:32.407 | 1:32.593 | +3.285 |
| 11 | 12 | (United Kingdom) Nigel Mansell | Lotus-Renault | 1:34.610 | 1:32.423 | +3.301 |
| 12 | 35 | (United Kingdom) Derek Warwick | Toleman-Hart | 1:33.738 | 1:32.677 | +3.555 |
| 13 | 8 | (Austria) Niki Lauda | McLaren-TAG | 1:33.190 | 1:33.133 | +4.011 |
| 14 | 36 | (Italy) Bruno Giacomelli | Toleman-Hart | 1:35.489 | 1:33.384 | +4.262 |
| 15 | 7 | (United Kingdom) John Watson | McLaren-TAG | 1:35.928 | 1:34.705 | +5.583 |
| 16 | 1 | (Finland) Keke Rosberg | Williams-Ford | 1:36.631 | 1:35.291 | +6.169 |
| 17 | 40 | (Sweden) Stefan Johansson | Spirit-Honda | 1:37.862 | 1:35.483 | +6.361 |
| 18 | 30 | (Belgium) Thierry Boutsen | Arrows-Ford | 1:36.968 | 1:35.624 | +6.502 |
| 19 | 25 | (France) Jean-Pierre Jarier | Ligier-Ford | 1:37.270 | 1:36.220 | +7.098 |
| 20 | 29 | (Switzerland) Marc Surer | Arrows-Ford | 1:36.796 | 1:36.435 | +7.313 |
| 21 | 33 | (Colombia) Roberto Guerrero | Theodore-Ford | 1:37.677 | 1:36.619 | +7.497 |
| 22 | 4 | (United States) Danny Sullivan | Tyrrell-Ford | 1:37.565 | 1:36.644 | +7.522 |
| 23 | 32 | (Italy) Piercarlo Ghinzani | Osella-Alfa Romeo | 1:36.647 | no time | +7.525 |
| 24 | 3 | (Italy) Michele Alboreto | Tyrrell-Ford | 1:36.788 | 1:37.319 | +7.666 |
| 25 | 31 | (Italy) Corrado Fabi | Osella-Alfa Romeo | 1:38.577 | 1:36.834 | +7.712 |
| 26 | 34 | (Venezuela) Johnny Cecotto | Theodore-Ford | 1:37.105 | 1:37.634 | +7.983 |
| 27 | 26 | (Brazil) Raul Boesel | Ligier-Ford | 1:37.798 | 1:37.186 | +8.064 |
| 28 | 2 | (France) Jacques Laffite | Williams-Ford | 1:37.277 | 1:37.245 | +8.123 |
| 29 | 17 | (United Kingdom) Kenny Acheson | RAM-Ford | 1:37.755 | 1:37.272 | +8.150 |

=== Race ===
| Pos | No | Driver | Constructor | Tyre | Laps | Time/Retired | Grid | Points |
|---|---|---|---|---|---|---|---|---|
| 1 | 5 | (Brazil) Nelson Piquet | Brabham-BMW | MI | 52 | 1:23:10.880 | 4 | 9 |
| 2 | 28 | (France) René Arnoux | Ferrari | G | 52 | +10.212 | 3 | 6 |
| 3 | 16 | (United States) Eddie Cheever | Renault | MI | 52 | +18.612 | 7 | 4 |
| 4 | 27 | (France) Patrick Tambay | Ferrari | G | 52 | +29.023 | 2 | 3 |
| 5 | 11 | (Italy) Elio de Angelis | Lotus-Renault | P | 52 | +53.680 | 8 | 2 |
| 6 | 35 | (United Kingdom) Derek Warwick | Toleman-Hart | P | 52 | +1:13.348 | 12 | 1 |
| 7 | 36 | (Italy) Bruno Giacomelli | Toleman-Hart | P | 52 | +1:33.922 | 14 | |
| 8 | 12 | (United Kingdom) Nigel Mansell | Lotus-Renault | P | 52 | +1:36.035 | 11 | |
| 9 | 25 | (France) Jean-Pierre Jarier | Ligier-Ford | MI | 51 | +1 lap | 19 | |
| 10 | 29 | (Switzerland) Marc Surer | Arrows-Ford | G | 51 | +1 lap | 20 | |
| 11 | 1 | (Finland) Keke Rosberg | Williams-Ford | G | 51 | +1 lap | 16 | |
| 12 | 34 | (Venezuela) Johnny Cecotto | Theodore-Ford | G | 50 | +2 laps | 26 | |
| 13 | 33 | (Colombia) Roberto Guerrero | Theodore-Ford | G | 50 | +2 laps | 21 | |
| Ret | 31 | (Italy) Corrado Fabi | Osella-Alfa Romeo | MI | 45 | Engine | 25 | |
| Ret | 4 | (United States) Danny Sullivan | Tyrrell-Ford | G | 44 | Fuel system | 22 | |
| Ret | 30 | (Belgium) Thierry Boutsen | Arrows-Ford | G | 41 | Engine | 18 | |
| Ret | 9 | (West Germany) Manfred Winkelhock | ATS-BMW | G | 35 | Exhaust | 9 | |
| Ret | 3 | (Italy) Michele Alboreto | Tyrrell-Ford | G | 28 | Clutch | 24 | |
| Ret | 15 | (France) Alain Prost | Renault | MI | 26 | Turbo | 5 | |
| Ret | 8 | (Austria) Niki Lauda | McLaren-TAG | MI | 24 | Electrical | 13 | |
| Ret | 7 | (United Kingdom) John Watson | McLaren-TAG | MI | 13 | Electrical | 15 | |
| Ret | 32 | (Italy) Piercarlo Ghinzani | Osella-Alfa Romeo | MI | 10 | Gearbox | 23 | |
| Ret | 23 | (Italy) Mauro Baldi | Alfa Romeo | MI | 4 | Turbo | 10 | |
| Ret | 40 | (Sweden) Stefan Johansson | Spirit-Honda | G | 4 | Distributor | 17 | |
| Ret | 6 | (Italy) Riccardo Patrese | Brabham-BMW | MI | 2 | Engine | 1 | |
| Ret | 22 | (Italy) Andrea de Cesaris | Alfa Romeo | MI | 2 | Collision | 6 | |
| DNQ | 26 | (Brazil) Raul Boesel | Ligier-Ford | MI | | | | |
| DNQ | 2 | (France) Jacques Laffite | Williams-Ford | G | | | | |
| DNQ | 17 | (United Kingdom) Kenny Acheson | RAM-Ford | P | | | | |

== Championship standings after the race ==
Drivers' Championship standings

| Pos | Driver | Points |
|---|---|---|
| 1 | (France) Alain Prost | 51 |
| 2 | (France) René Arnoux | 49 |
| 3 | (Brazil) Nelson Piquet | 46 |
| 4 | (France) Patrick Tambay | 40 |
| 5 | (Finland) Keke Rosberg | 25 |

Constructors' Championship standings

| Pos | Constructor | Points |
|---|---|---|
| 1 | (Italy) Ferrari | 89 |
| 2 | (France) Renault | 72 |
| 3 | (United Kingdom) Brabham-BMW | 50 |
| 4 | (United Kingdom) Williams-Ford | 36 |
| 5 | (United Kingdom) McLaren-Ford | 34 |

- Note: Only the top five positions are included for both sets of standings.

| Previous race: 1983 Dutch Grand Prix | FIA Formula One World Championship; 1983 season | Next race: 1983 European Grand Prix |
| Previous race: 1982 Italian Grand Prix | Italian Grand Prix | Next race: 1984 Italian Grand Prix |
Awards
| Preceded by 1982 British Grand Prix | Formula One Promotional Trophy for Race Promoter; 1983 | Succeeded by 1984 Detroit Grand Prix |
