= 1983 Dutch Grand Prix =

- Race 12 of 15 in the 1983 Formula One World Championship
- The Zandvoort Circuit (1980–1989)

Race details
- Date: 28 August 1983
- Official name: XXX Grote Prijs van Nederland
- Location: Circuit Zandvoort, Zandvoort, Netherlands
- Course: Permanent racing facility
- Course length: 4.252 km (2.642 miles)
- Distance: 72 laps, 306.144 km (190.229 miles)
- Weather: Cloudy

Pole position
Driver	(Brazil) Nelson Piquet	Brabham-BMW
- Time: 1:15.630

Fastest lap
Driver	(France) René Arnoux	Ferrari
- Time: 1:19.863 on lap 33

Podium
First	(France) René Arnoux	Ferrari
Second	(France) Patrick Tambay	Ferrari
Third	(United Kingdom) John Watson	McLaren-Ford

The 1983 Dutch Grand Prix was a Formula One motor race held at Zandvoort on 28 August 1983. It was the twelfth race of the 1983 Formula One World Championship.

The 72-lap race was won by René Arnoux, driving a Ferrari, with team-mate Patrick Tambay second and John Watson third in a McLaren-Ford. Alain Prost and Nelson Piquet collided midway through the race while challenging for the lead, allowing Arnoux to move into second in the Drivers' Championship, eight points behind Prost. However, this would turn out to be Arnoux's last Formula One victory.

Derek Warwick finished fourth to score his and the Toleman team's first points. Mauro Baldi in the Alfa Romeo and Michele Alboreto in the Tyrrell completed the top six.

The race saw McLaren debut the new Porsche-built TAG turbo engine. Niki Lauda drove the TAG-powered MP4/1E car, while Watson continued with the Ford-powered McLaren. However, Lauda could only qualify 19th, four places behind Watson, and retired on lap 26 with a brake failure. Watson's third place was the last time a car with a naturally aspirated engine would legally finish on a Formula One podium until the 1988 Canadian Grand Prix.

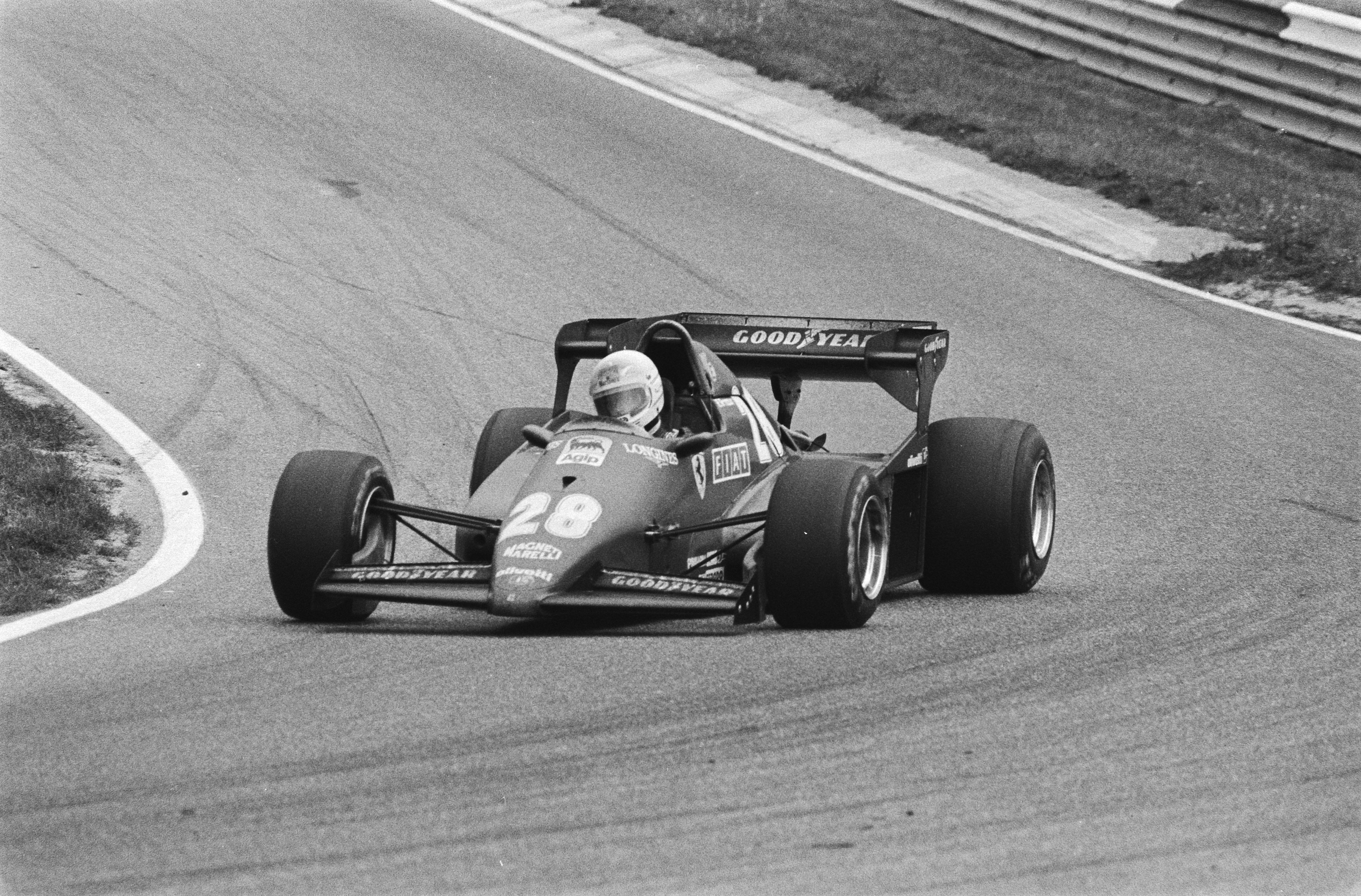
René Arnoux won the race for Ferrari.

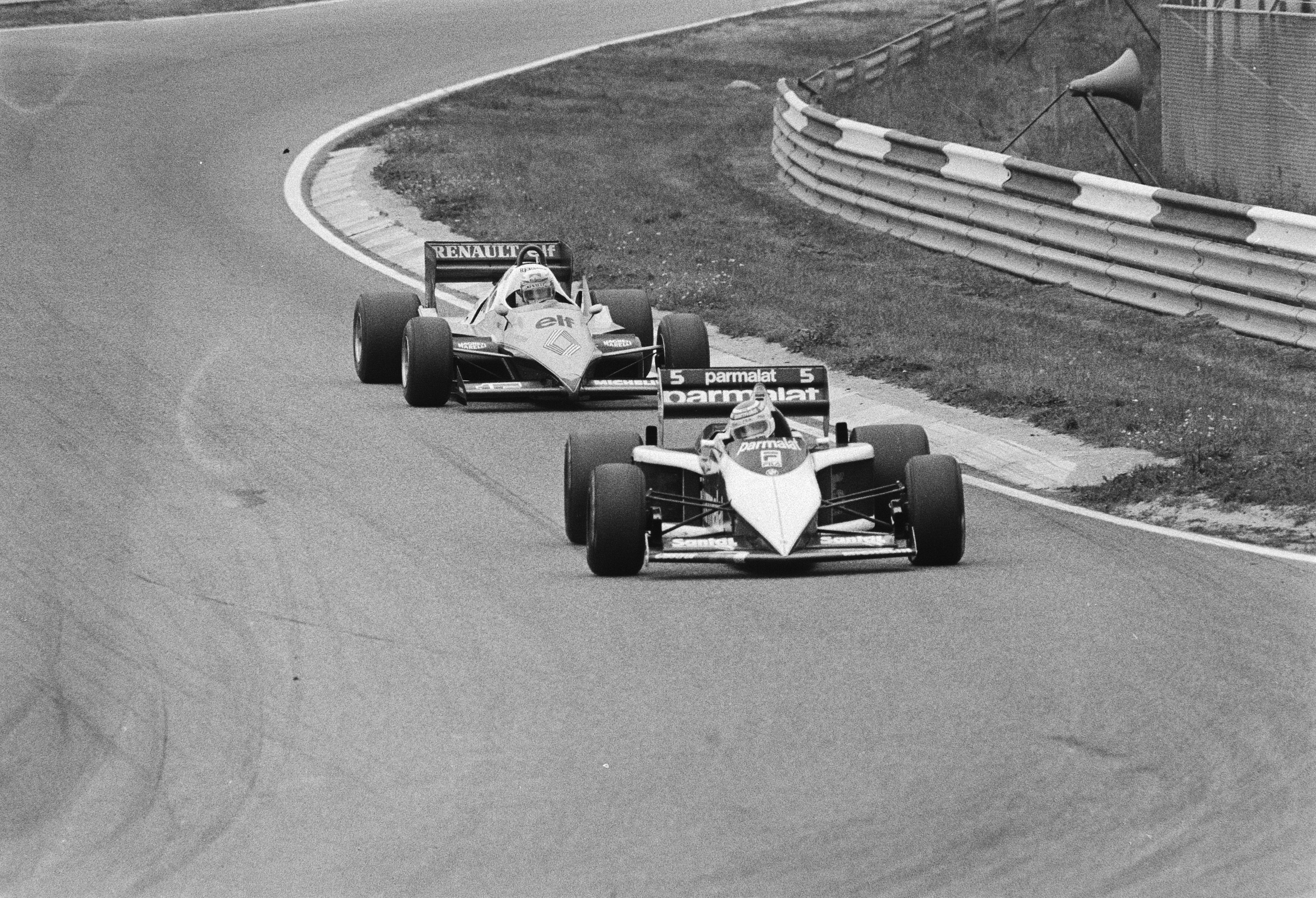
Nelson Piquet and Alain Prost prior to their collision.

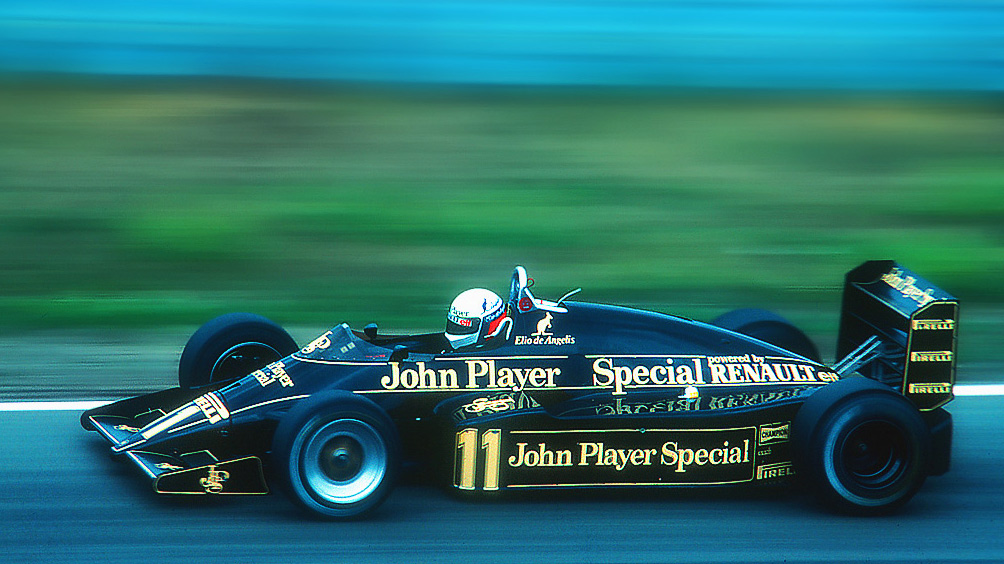
Elio de Angelis retired early due to an electrical failure.

== Classification ==
=== Qualifying ===
Pos	No	Driver	Constructor	Q1	Q2	Gap
1	5	(Brazil) Nelson Piquet	Brabham-BMW	1:17.194	1:15.630	—
2	27	(France) Patrick Tambay	Ferrari	1:16.857	1:16.370	+0.740
3	11	(Italy) Elio de Angelis	Lotus-Renault	1:16.411	8:39.650	+0.781
4	15	(France) Alain Prost	Renault	1:16.611	1:16.642	+0.981
5	12	(United Kingdom) Nigel Mansell	Lotus-Renault	1:16.721	1:16.711	+1.081
6	6	(Italy) Riccardo Patrese	Brabham-BMW	1:17.544	1:16.940	+1.310
7	35	(United Kingdom) Derek Warwick	Toleman-Hart	1:17.198	1:17.666	+1.568
8	22	(Italy) Andrea de Cesaris	Alfa Romeo	1:17.233	1:17.552	+1.603
9	9	(West Germany) Manfred Winkelhock	ATS-BMW	1:18.086	1:17.306	+1.676
10	28	(France) René Arnoux	Ferrari	1:18.202	1:17.397	+1.767
11	16	(United States) Eddie Cheever	Renault	1:18.067	1:17.676	+2.046
12	23	(Italy) Mauro Baldi	Alfa Romeo	1:17.887	1:18.885	+2.257
13	36	(Italy) Bruno Giacomelli	Toleman-Hart	1:18.642	1:17.902	+2.272
14	29	(Switzerland) Marc Surer	Arrows-Ford	1:20.153	1:19.696	+4.066
15	7	(United Kingdom) John Watson	McLaren-Ford	1:21.010	1:19.787	+4.157
16	40	(Sweden) Stefan Johansson	Spirit-Honda	1:20.447	1:19.966	+4.336
17	2	(France) Jacques Laffite	Williams-Ford	1:21.395	1:19.979	+4.349
18	3	(Italy) Michele Alboreto	Tyrrell-Ford	1:20.149	1:20.282	+4.519
19	8	(Austria) Niki Lauda	McLaren-TAG	1:20.169	1:21.050	+4.539
20	33	(Colombia) Roberto Guerrero	Theodore-Ford	1:21.592	1:20.190	+4.560
21	30	(Belgium) Thierry Boutsen	Arrows-Ford	1:20.245	1:20.257	+4.615
22	25	(France) Jean-Pierre Jarier	Ligier-Ford	1:20.381	1:20.247	+4.617
23	1	(Finland) Keke Rosberg	Williams-Ford	1:20.666	1:20.391	+4.761
24	26	(Brazil) Raul Boesel	Ligier-Ford	1:21.738	1:20.660	+5.030
25	31	(Italy) Corrado Fabi	Osella-Alfa Romeo	1:22.047	1:20.815	+5.185
26	4	(United States) Danny Sullivan	Tyrrell-Ford	1:20.863	1:20.842	+5.212
27	32	(Italy) Piercarlo Ghinzani	Osella-Alfa Romeo	1:21.763	1:20.926	+5.296
28	34	(Venezuela) Johnny Cecotto	Theodore-Ford	1:21.734	1:20.955	+5.325
29	17	(United Kingdom) Kenny Acheson	RAM-Ford	1:23.425	1:23.093	+7.463

=== Race ===
Pos	No	Driver	Constructor	Tyre	Laps	Time/Retired	Grid	Points
1	28	(France) René Arnoux	Ferrari	G	72	1:38:41.950	10	9
2	27	(France) Patrick Tambay	Ferrari	G	72	+ 20.839	2	6
3	7	(United Kingdom) John Watson	McLaren-Ford	MI	72	+ 43.741	15	4
4	35	(United Kingdom) Derek Warwick	Toleman-Hart	P	72	+ 1:16.839	7	3
5	23	(Italy) Mauro Baldi	Alfa Romeo	MI	72	+ 1:24.292	12	2
6	3	(Italy) Michele Alboreto	Tyrrell-Ford	G	71	+ 1 lap	18	1
7	40	(Sweden) Stefan Johansson	Spirit-Honda	G	70	+ 2 laps	16	
8	29	(Switzerland) Marc Surer	Arrows-Ford	G	70	+ 2 laps	14	
9	6	(Italy) Riccardo Patrese	Brabham-BMW	MI	70	+ 2 laps	6	
10	26	(Brazil) Raul Boesel	Ligier-Ford	MI	70	+ 2 laps	24	
11	31	(Italy) Corrado Fabi	Osella-Alfa Romeo	MI	68	Engine	25	
12	33	(Colombia) Roberto Guerrero	Theodore-Ford	G	68	+ 4 laps	20	
13	36	(Italy) Bruno Giacomelli	Toleman-Hart	P	68	Spun off	13	
14	30	(Belgium) Thierry Boutsen	Arrows-Ford	G	65	Engine	21	
Ret	1	(Finland) Keke Rosberg	Williams-Ford	G	53	Ignition	23	
DSQ	9	(West Germany) Manfred Winkelhock	ATS-BMW	G	50	Overtaking on formation lap	9	
Ret	5	(Brazil) Nelson Piquet	Brabham-BMW	MI	41	Collision	1	
Ret	15	(France) Alain Prost	Renault	MI	41	Suspension	4	
Ret	16	(United States) Eddie Cheever	Renault	MI	39	Electrical	11	
Ret	2	(France) Jacques Laffite	Williams-Ford	G	37	Handling	17	
Ret	12	(United Kingdom) Nigel Mansell	Lotus-Renault	P	26	Spun off	5	
Ret	8	(Austria) Niki Lauda	McLaren-TAG	MI	25	Brakes	19	
Ret	4	(United States) Danny Sullivan	Tyrrell-Ford	G	20	Engine	26	
Ret	11	(Italy) Elio de Angelis	Lotus-Renault	P	12	Electrical	3	
Ret	22	(Italy) Andrea de Cesaris	Alfa Romeo	MI	5	Engine	8	
Ret	25	(France) Jean-Pierre Jarier	Ligier-Ford	MI	3	Suspension	22	
DNQ	32	(Italy) Piercarlo Ghinzani	Osella-Alfa Romeo	MI				
DNQ	34	(Venezuela) Johnny Cecotto	Theodore-Ford	G				
DNQ	17	(United Kingdom) Kenny Acheson	RAM-Ford	P				

== Championship standings after the race ==
Drivers' Championship standings

Pos	Driver	Points
1	(France) Alain Prost	51
2	(France) René Arnoux	43
3	(Brazil) Nelson Piquet	37
4	(France) Patrick Tambay	37
5	(Finland) Keke Rosberg	25

Constructors' Championship standings

Pos	Constructor	Points
1	(Italy) Ferrari	80
2	(France) Renault	68
3	(United Kingdom) Brabham-BMW	41
4	(United Kingdom) Williams-Ford	36
5	(United Kingdom) McLaren-Ford	34

- Note: Only the top five positions are included for both sets of standings.

Previous race: 1983 Austrian Grand Prix	FIA Formula One World Championship; 1983 season	Next race: 1983 Italian Grand Prix
Previous race: 1982 Dutch Grand Prix	Dutch Grand Prix	Next race: 1984 Dutch Grand Prix
