= 1983 Austrian Grand Prix =

- Race 11 of 15 in the 1983 Formula One World Championship
- The Österreichring (last modified in 1977)

Race details
- Date: 14 August 1983
- Official name: XXI Holiday Großer Preis von Osterreich
- Location: Österreichring; Spielberg, Styria, Austria
- Course: Permanent racing facility
- Course length: 5.942 km (3.692 miles)
- Distance: 53 laps, 314.926 km (195.686 miles)
- Weather: Dry

Pole position
Driver	(France) Patrick Tambay	Ferrari
- Time: 1:29.871

Fastest lap
Driver	(France) Alain Prost	Renault
- Time: 1:33.961 on lap 20

Podium
First	(France) Alain Prost	Renault
Second	(France) René Arnoux	Ferrari
Third	(Brazil) Nelson Piquet	Brabham-BMW

The 1983 Austrian Grand Prix was a Formula One motor race held at the Österreichring on 14 August 1983. It was the eleventh race of the 1983 FIA Formula One World Championship.

The 53-lap race was won by Alain Prost, driving a factory Renault, with Drivers' Championship rivals René Arnoux and Nelson Piquet second and third in a Ferrari and a Brabham-BMW respectively. With the win, Prost extended his lead in the Drivers' Championship to 14 points with four races remaining. However, this would turn out to be the final victory for the original factory Renault team.

== Classification ==
=== Qualifying ===
Pos	No	Driver	Constructor	Q1	Q2	Gap
1	27	(France) Patrick Tambay	Ferrari	1:30.358	1:29.871	—
2	28	(France) René Arnoux	Ferrari	1:29.995	1:29.935	+0.064
3	12	(United Kingdom) Nigel Mansell	Lotus-Renault	1:31.263	1:30.457	+0.586
4	5	(Brazil) Nelson Piquet	Brabham-BMW	1:31.912	1:30.566	+0.695
5	15	(France) Alain Prost	Renault	1:30.841	1:32.187	+0.970
6	6	(Italy) Riccardo Patrese	Brabham-BMW	1:31.770	1:31.440	+1.569
7	36	(Italy) Bruno Giacomelli	Toleman-Hart	1:33.333	1:31.693	+1.822
8	16	(United States) Eddie Cheever	Renault	1:31.695	1:31.962	+1.824
9	23	(Italy) Mauro Baldi	Alfa Romeo	1:31.802	1:31.769	+1.898
10	35	(United Kingdom) Derek Warwick	Toleman-Hart	1:32.888	1:31.962	+2.091
11	22	(Italy) Andrea de Cesaris	Alfa Romeo	1:32.359	1:32.720	+2.488
12	11	(Italy) Elio de Angelis	Lotus-Renault	1:34.818	1:32.451	+2.580
13	9	(West Germany) Manfred Winkelhock	ATS-BMW	1:33.754	1:33.211	+3.340
14	8	(Austria) Niki Lauda	McLaren-Ford	1:34.518	1:36.604	+4.647
15	1	(Finland) Keke Rosberg	Williams-Ford	1:36.136	1:35.380	+5.509
16	40	(Sweden) Stefan Johansson	Spirit-Honda	1:40.330	1:35.892	+6.021
17	7	(United Kingdom) John Watson	McLaren-Ford	1:36.059	1:36.141	+6.188
18	3	(Italy) Michele Alboreto	Tyrrell-Ford	1:36.347	1:36.079	+6.208
19	30	(Belgium) Thierry Boutsen	Arrows-Ford	1:37.253	1:36.357	+6.486
20	25	(France) Jean-Pierre Jarier	Ligier-Ford	1:36.435	1:36.437	+6.564
21	33	(Colombia) Roberto Guerrero	Theodore-Ford	1:36.918	1:36.532	+6.661
22	29	(Switzerland) Marc Surer	Arrows-Ford	1:37.175	1:36.619	+6.748
23	4	(United States) Danny Sullivan	Tyrrell-Ford	1:37.858	1:36.772	+6.901
24	2	(France) Jacques Laffite	Williams-Ford	1:37.546	1:37.017	+7.146
25	32	(Italy) Piercarlo Ghinzani	Osella-Alfa Romeo	1:38.455	1:37.117	+7.246
26	31	(Italy) Corrado Fabi	Osella-Alfa Romeo	1:37.650	1:37.217	+7.346
27	26	(Brazil) Raul Boesel	Ligier-Ford	1:37.400	1:37.554	+7.529
28	34	(Venezuela) Johnny Cecotto	Theodore-Ford	1:37.677	1:37.497	+7.626
29	17	(United Kingdom) Kenny Acheson	RAM-Ford	1:38.974	1:39.138	+9.103

=== Race ===
Pos	No	Driver	Constructor	Tyre	Laps	Time/Retired	Grid	Points
1	15	(France) Alain Prost	Renault	MI	53	1:24:32.745	5	9
2	28	(France) René Arnoux	Ferrari	G	53	+ 6.835	2	6
3	5	(Brazil) Nelson Piquet	Brabham-BMW	MI	53	+ 27.659	4	4
4	16	(United States) Eddie Cheever	Renault	MI	53	+ 28.395	8	3
5	12	(United Kingdom) Nigel Mansell	Lotus-Renault	P	52	+ 1 Lap	3	2
6	8	(Austria) Niki Lauda	McLaren-Ford	MI	51	+ 2 Laps	14	1
7	25	(France) Jean-Pierre Jarier	Ligier-Ford	MI	51	+ 2 Laps	20	
8	1	(Finland) Keke Rosberg	Williams-Ford	G	51	+ 2 Laps	15	
9	7	(United Kingdom) John Watson	McLaren-Ford	MI	51	+ 2 Laps	17	
10	31	(Italy) Corrado Fabi	Osella-Alfa Romeo	MI	50	+ 3 Laps	26	
11	32	(Italy) Piercarlo Ghinzani	Osella-Alfa Romeo	MI	49	+ 4 Laps	25	
12	40	(Sweden) Stefan Johansson	Spirit-Honda	G	48	+ 5 Laps	16	
13	30	(Belgium) Thierry Boutsen	Arrows-Ford	G	48	+ 5 Laps	19	
Ret	9	(West Germany) Manfred Winkelhock	ATS-BMW	G	33	Water Leak	13	
Ret	22	(Italy) Andrea de Cesaris	Alfa Romeo	MI	31	Out of Fuel	11	
Ret	27	(France) Patrick Tambay	Ferrari	G	30	Ignition	1	
Ret	6	(Italy) Riccardo Patrese	Brabham-BMW	MI	29	Engine	6	
Ret	33	(Colombia) Roberto Guerrero	Theodore-Ford	G	25	Gearbox	21	
Ret	2	(France) Jacques Laffite	Williams-Ford	G	21	Vibrations	24	
Ret	23	(Italy) Mauro Baldi	Alfa Romeo	MI	13	Oil Leak	9	
Ret	3	(Italy) Michele Alboreto	Tyrrell-Ford	G	8	Collision	18	
Ret	35	(United Kingdom) Derek Warwick	Toleman-Hart	P	2	Turbo	10	
Ret	36	(Italy) Bruno Giacomelli	Toleman-Hart	P	1	Radiator	7	
Ret	11	(Italy) Elio de Angelis	Lotus-Renault	P	0	Collision	12	
Ret	29	(Switzerland) Marc Surer	Arrows-Ford	G	0	Collision	22	
Ret	4	(United States) Danny Sullivan	Tyrrell-Ford	G	0	Collision	23	
DNQ	26	(Brazil) Raul Boesel	Ligier-Ford	MI				
DNQ	34	(Venezuela) Johnny Cecotto	Theodore-Ford	G				
DNQ	17	(United Kingdom) Kenny Acheson	RAM-Ford	P				

== Championship standings after the race ==
Drivers' Championship standings

Pos	Driver	Points
1	(France) Alain Prost	51
2	(Brazil) Nelson Piquet	37
3	(France) René Arnoux	34
4	(France) Patrick Tambay	31
5	(Finland) Keke Rosberg	25

Constructors' Championship standings

Pos	Constructor	Points
1	(France) Renault	68
2	(Italy) Ferrari	65
3	(United Kingdom) Brabham-BMW	41
4	(United Kingdom) Williams-Ford	36
5	(United Kingdom) McLaren-Ford	30

- Note: Only the top five positions are included for both sets of standings.

Previous race: 1983 German Grand Prix	FIA Formula One World Championship; 1983 season	Next race: 1983 Dutch Grand Prix
Previous race: 1982 Austrian Grand Prix	Austrian Grand Prix	Next race: 1984 Austrian Grand Prix
