= Spirit Racing =

Auto racing team

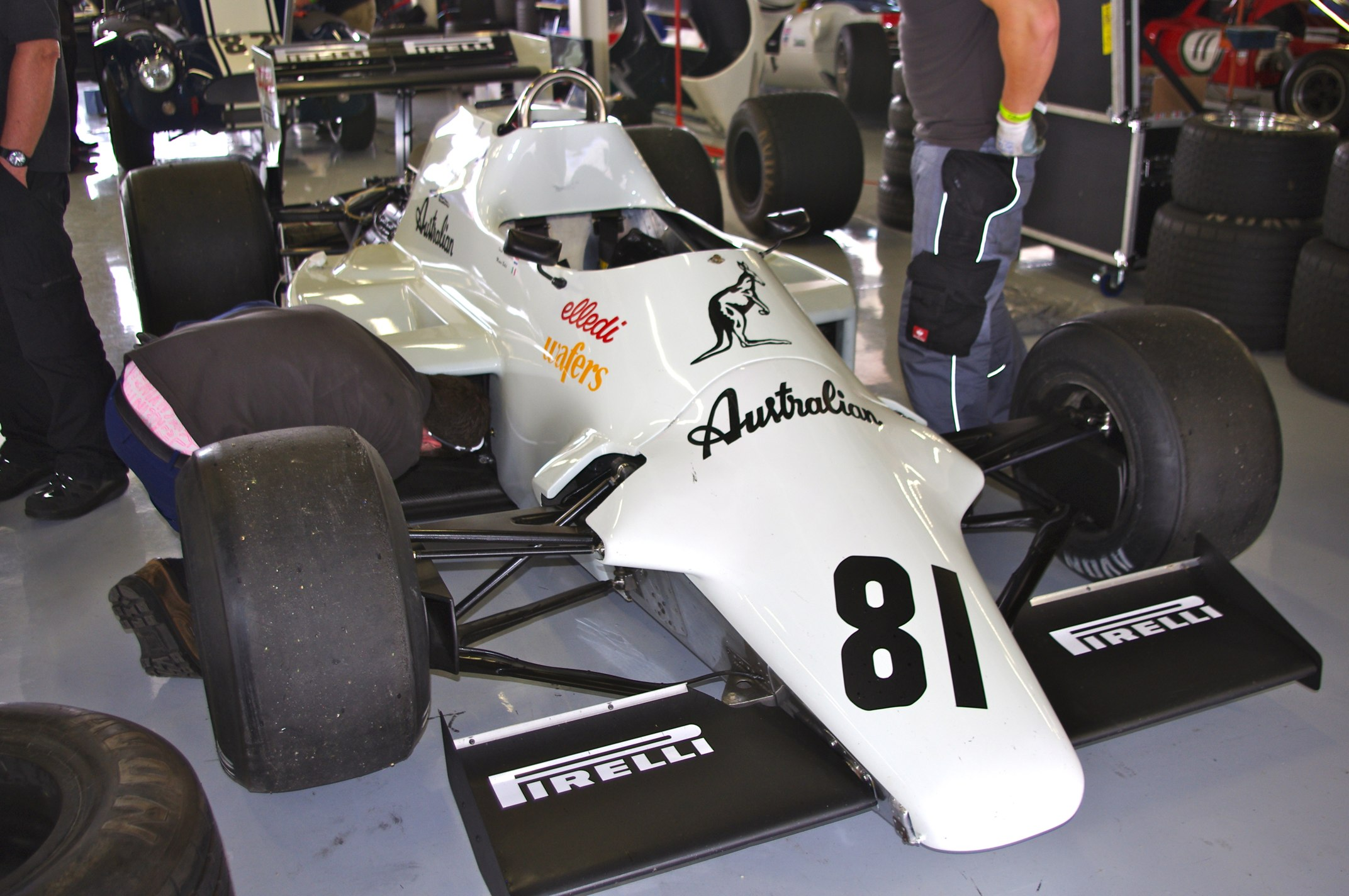
- Base: Slough, Berkshire, United Kingdom
- Founder(s): Gordon Coppuck; John Wickham
- Noted drivers: Stefan Johansson; Thierry Boutsen; Mauro Baldi; Huub Rothengatter

Formula One World Championship career
- First entry: 1983 British Grand Prix
- Races entered: 25 (23 starts)
- Engines: Honda RA163E V6 (t/c) (1983); Hart 415T L4 (t/c) (1984–1985); Ford Cosworth DFV V8 (1984)
- Constructors' Championships: 0
- Drivers' Championships: 0
- Race victories: 0 (best finish: 7th, 1983 Dutch Grand Prix)
- Podiums: 0
- Points: 0
- Pole positions: 0 (best grid position: 13th, 1983 German Grand Prix)
- Fastest laps: 0
- Final entry: 1985 San Marino Grand Prix

Spirit Racing was a racing car constructor and racing team from the United Kingdom. Founded in 1981, it participated in the 1982 European Formula Two Championship, moved to Formula One in 1983 (staying to the end of the 1985 season), then competing in the 1988 F3000 season before finally folding at the end of that year. In 26 F1 races (including the non-championship 1983 Race of Champions), its best finish was seventh at the 1983 Dutch Grand Prix.

== Formula Two ==
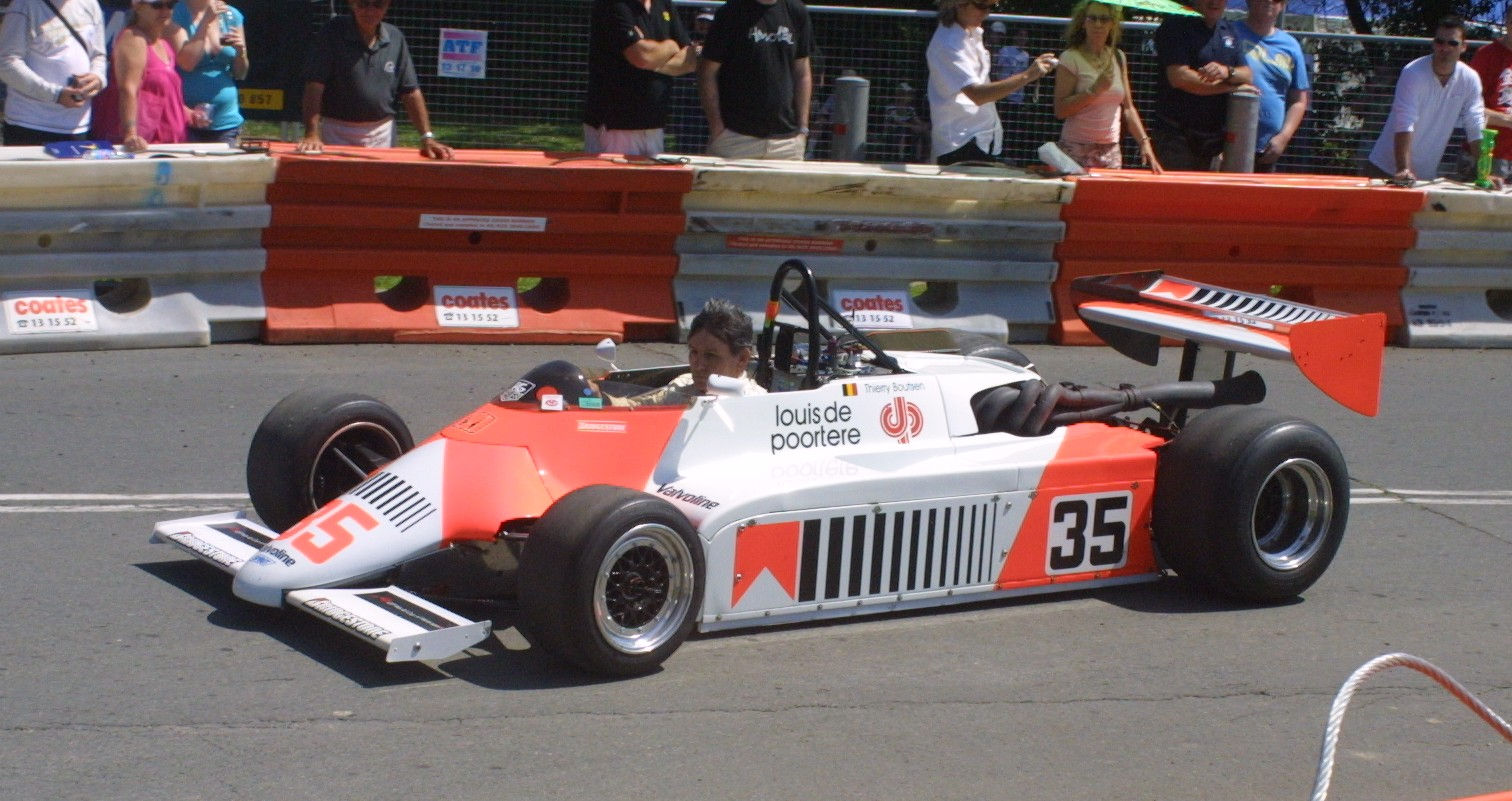
Thierry Boutsen's F2 Spirit 201

Spirit Racing was founded in August 1981 by ex-March employees Gordon Coppuck and John Wickham with backing from Bridgestone and Honda, who were keen to re-enter Formula One as an engine supplier. The initial plan was to participate in the 1982 European Formula Two Championship, and so ex-McLaren designer John Baldwin was hired to produce the Spirit 201 chassis with Coppuck, to be powered by a naturally-aspirated 2-litre Honda V6 engine. With sponsorship from Marlboro and capable drivers in Stefan Johansson and Thierry Boutsen, the car was an immediate success, taking pole position in eight of the 13 rounds of the championship, while Boutsen won three times and challenged for the title before losing out in the final round to the March of Corrado Fabi.

Also in 1983 Geoff Lees won the Japanese Formula Two Championship winning two races while driving the Spirit 201.

== Formula One ==
Before the F2 championship was over, Honda had built prototypes for a turbocharged Formula One engine. After a dummy unit was sent to Spirit, the team modified one of its 201 chassis to meet F1 regulations, and began a testing programme with the new engine in November 1982 at Silverstone, with plans to join the F1 World Championship midway through the 1983 season. Honda were anxious to keep a low profile – much as they had been when they had first entered F1 two decades earlier – and so the team avoided testing at the same time as other F1 teams, while also taking its programme to Willow Springs and Riverside in California. Then, when the decision was made to enter one car into the World Championship, Johansson was chosen as the driver – he was seen as a faded talent having made a disappointing F1 debut for Shadow in 1980, whereas Boutsen was seen as a star of the future.

After a further test at Jacarepaguá, the team made its competitive F1 debut in April 1983, at the non-championship Race of Champions at Brands Hatch. In a field of 13 cars, Johansson set the second-fastest time in free practice, but suffered engine problems in qualifying and started 12th. He then retired early with a punctured radiator following a collision with the Theodore of Roberto Guerrero. Following this, the team resumed its testing programme, with sessions at Silverstone, Brands Hatch and Donington Park, before making its World Championship debut in July at the British Grand Prix at Silverstone. Driving a further revision of the F2 car, the 201C, Johansson qualified 14th out of 29 cars despite continued engine problems, and ran strongly in the early stages before retiring with a broken fuel pump.

The team then continued in the championship until the penultimate race of the season, the European Grand Prix at Brands Hatch. Johansson tended to qualify ahead of most of the naturally-aspirated cars, and finished seventh at Zandvoort, but mechanical problems continued to blight the car. In the meantime, the team was building its first purpose-designed F1 car, the 101, but at the same time, Honda were showing concern at the lack of progress and were being courted by Williams, who offered a record of success. Following a disastrous weekend for Spirit at Monza, where the 101 was presented but not driven and Johansson suffered another early retirement, the Japanese company decided to supply its engines to Williams only, and Spirit thus missed the final race of the season at Kyalami.

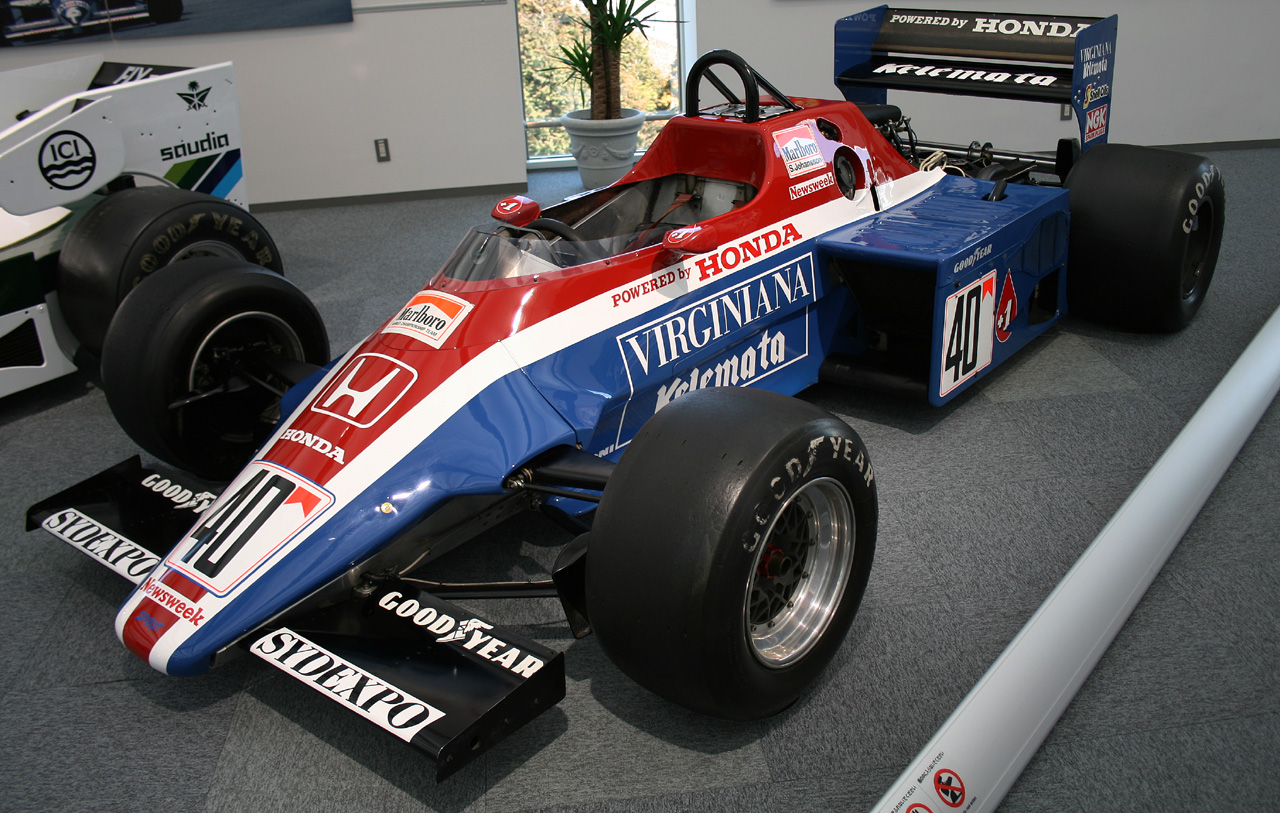
Spirit's first Formula One chassis, the 201C.

Spirit decided to continue in 1984 with Hart turbocharged engines. Initially twice world champion Emerson Fittipaldi and moneyed Italian Fulvio Ballabio were slated to drive. However Fittipaldi left to find a drive in Indy car racing after finding the machine uncompetitive and Ballabio was refused a Super Licence. Instead Mauro Baldi found funds and was nominated as the team's sole driver, Johansson being released as he could not find the funding to continue. The 101 was a neat but underpowered car and Baldi struggled to move away from the rear of the grid. Jean-Louis Schlesser had planned to take over from the third race before the threat of litigation from RAM (still owed money by the Frenchman) saw Baldi stay until Huub Rothengatter took over. When the Dutchman's money ran out Baldi found enough funds to complete the season. The team's best result was 8th place, scored by Baldi on three occasions and Rothengatter once.

The 101 chassis (having been progressively upgraded throughout 1984) was updated again for 1985 and Baldi continued to drive. Allen Berg had arranged a deal to take over the seat later in the season. Money was even tighter, however, and after three rounds Wickham decided to take up an offer from Toleman to buy out the team's tyre contract and folded the F1 outfit. Wickham initially promised to be back with a new car in 1986 but that never happened.

== Formula 3000 ==
Spirit briefly resurfaced in Formula 3000 in 1988, running Bertrand Gachot, Steve Kempton and Paolo Barilla with some success, but co-founder Wickham left the outfit midway through the season and the team folded at the end of the year.

== Formula Two results ==
(key) (results in bold indicate pole position)

Year	Chassis	Engine	Tyres	Driver(s)	1	2	3	4	5	6	7	8	9	10	11	12	13
1982	Spirit 201	Honda V6	**B**		SIL	HOC	THR	NUR	MUG	VAL	PAU	SPA	HOC	DON	MAN	PER	MIS
1982	Spirit 201	Honda V6	**B**	Thierry Boutsen	12	2	3	1	4	6	**2**	1	**Ret**	9	4	**1**	6
1982	Spirit 201	Honda V6	**B**	Stefan Johansson	**Ret**	Ret	**14**	6	**3**	**4**	7	**Ret**	4	11	Ret	11	7

== Complete Formula One results ==
(key)

Year	Chassis	Engine	Tyres	Drivers	1	2	3	4	5	6	7	8	9	10	11	12	13	14	15	16	Points	WCC
1983	Spirit 201; Spirit 201C	Honda RA163E; V6t	G		BRA	USW	FRA	SMR	MON	BEL	DET	CAN	GBR	GER	AUT	NED	ITA	EUR	RSA		0	NC
1983	Spirit 201; Spirit 201C	Honda RA163E; V6t	G	Stefan Johansson									Ret	Ret	12	7	Ret	14			0	NC
1984	Spirit 101	Hart 415T; L4t	P		BRA	RSA	BEL	SMR	FRA	MON	CAN	DET	DAL	GBR	GER	AUT	NED	ITA	EUR	POR	0	NC
1984	Spirit 101	Hart 415T; L4t	P	Mauro Baldi	Ret	8	Ret	8	Ret	DNQ									8	15	0	NC
1984	Spirit 101	Hart 415T; L4t	P	Huub Rothengatter							NC		Ret	NC	9	NC	Ret	8			0	NC
1984	Spirit 101C	Ford Cosworth DFV; V8	P	Huub Rothengatter								DNQ									0	NC
1985	Spirit 101D	Hart 415T; L4t	P		BRA	POR	SMR	MON	CAN	DET	FRA	GBR	GER	AUT	NED	ITA	BEL	EUR	RSA	AUS	0	NC
1985	Spirit 101D	Hart 415T; L4t	P	Mauro Baldi	Ret	Ret	Ret														0	NC
