= 1983 German Grand Prix =

- Race 10 of 15 in the 1983 Formula One World Championship

Race details
- Date: 7 August 1983
- Official name: XLV Großer Preis von Deutschland
- Location: Hockenheimring, Hockenheim, West Germany
- Course: Permanent racing facility
- Course length: 6.802 km (4.227 miles)
- Distance: 45 laps, 299.068 km (185.832 miles)
- Weather: Dry

Pole position
Driver	(France) Patrick Tambay	Ferrari
- Time: 1:49.328

Fastest lap
Driver	(France) René Arnoux	Ferrari
- Time: 1:53.938 on lap 12

Podium
First	(France) René Arnoux	Ferrari
Second	(Italy) Andrea de Cesaris	Alfa Romeo
Third	(Italy) Riccardo Patrese	Brabham-BMW

The 1983 German Grand Prix was a Formula One motor race held at the Hockenheimring on 7 August 1983. It was the tenth race of the 1983 Formula One World Championship.

The 45-lap race was won by French driver René Arnoux, driving a Ferrari, after he started from second position. Teammate and compatriot Patrick Tambay took pole position, but retired on lap 12 with an engine failure. Italian Andrea de Cesaris finished second in an Alfa Romeo, with another Italian, Riccardo Patrese, third in a Brabham-BMW.

Drivers' Championship leader, Frenchman Alain Prost, could only manage fourth in his Renault, but nonetheless extended his lead in the championship to nine points over Brazilian Nelson Piquet, who failed to score in the other Brabham-BMW. With his second win in three races, Arnoux moved up to fourth in the championship, five points behind Piquet and three behind Tambay in third.

Niki Lauda was disqualified from fifth for reversing his McLaren-Ford in the pits.

== Classification ==
=== Qualifying ===
Pos	No	Driver	Constructor	Q1	Q2	Gap
1	27	(France) Patrick Tambay	Ferrari	1:49.328	2:10.057	—
2	28	(France) René Arnoux	Ferrari	1:49.435	2:09.594	+0.107
3	22	(Italy) Andrea de Cesaris	Alfa Romeo	1:50.845	2:16.694	+1.522
4	5	(Brazil) Nelson Piquet	Brabham-BMW	1:51.082	2:16.969	+1.754
5	15	(France) Alain Prost	Renault	1:51.228	2:13.620	+1.900
6	16	(United States) Eddie Cheever	Renault	1:51.540	2:09.752	+2.212
7	23	(Italy) Mauro Baldi	Alfa Romeo	1:51.867	2:15.218	+2.539
8	6	(Italy) Riccardo Patrese	Brabham-BMW	1:52.105	no time	+2.777
9	35	(United Kingdom) Derek Warwick	Toleman-Hart	1:54.199	2:13.461	+4.871
10	36	(Italy) Bruno Giacomelli	Toleman-Hart	1:54.648	13:17.646	+5.320
11	11	(Italy) Elio de Angelis	Lotus-Renault	1:54.831	2:14.182	+5.503
12	1	(Finland) Keke Rosberg	Williams-Ford	1:55.289	2:13.337	+5.961
13	40	(Sweden) Stefan Johansson	Spirit-Honda	1:55.870	10:37.156	+6.542
14	30	(Belgium) Thierry Boutsen	Arrows-Ford	1:56.015	no time	+6.687
15	2	(France) Jacques Laffite	Williams-Ford	1:56.318	2:15.838	+6.990
16	3	(Italy) Michele Alboreto	Tyrrell-Ford	1:56.398	2:15.547	+7.070
17	12	(United Kingdom) Nigel Mansell	Lotus-Renault	1:56.490	16:03.168	+7.162
18	8	(Austria) Niki Lauda	McLaren-Ford	1:56.730	no time	+7.402
19	25	(France) Jean-Pierre Jarier	Ligier-Ford	1:57.018	2:15.326	+7.690
20	29	(Switzerland) Marc Surer	Arrows-Ford	1:57.072	40:52.470	+7.744
21	4	(United States) Danny Sullivan	Tyrrell-Ford	1:57.426	2:18.376	+8.098
22	34	(Venezuela) Johnny Cecotto	Theodore-Ford	1:57.744	2:15.753	+8.416
23	7	(United Kingdom) John Watson	McLaren-Ford	1:57.776	no time	+8.448
24	33	(Colombia) Roberto Guerrero	Theodore-Ford	1:57.790	2:17.479	+8.462
25	26	(Brazil) Raul Boesel	Ligier-Ford	1:58.413	no time	+9.085
26	32	(Italy) Piercarlo Ghinzani	Osella-Alfa Romeo	1:58.473	2:19.172	+9.145
DNQ	17	(United Kingdom) Kenny Acheson	RAM-Ford	1:59.003	2:20.758	+9.675
DNQ	31	(Italy) Corrado Fabi	Osella-Alfa Romeo	2:01.113	2:22.859	+11.785
DNQ	9	(West Germany) Manfred Winkelhock	ATS-BMW	no time	no time	n/a

=== Race ===
Pos	No	Driver	Constructor	Tyre	Laps	Time/Retired	Grid	Points
1	28	(France) René Arnoux	Ferrari	G	45	1:27:10.319	2	9
2	22	(Italy) Andrea de Cesaris	Alfa Romeo	MI	45	+ 1:10.652	3	6
3	6	(Italy) Riccardo Patrese	Brabham-BMW	MI	45	+ 1:44.093	8	4
4	15	(France) Alain Prost	Renault	MI	45	+ 2:00.750	5	3
5	7	(United Kingdom) John Watson	McLaren-Ford	MI	44	+ 1 lap	23	2
6	2	(France) Jacques Laffite	Williams-Ford	G	44	+ 1 lap	15	1
7	29	(Switzerland) Marc Surer	Arrows-Ford	G	44	+ 1 lap	20	
8	25	(France) Jean-Pierre Jarier	Ligier-Ford	MI	44	+ 1 lap	19	
9	30	(Belgium) Thierry Boutsen	Arrows-Ford	G	44	+ 1 lap	14	
10	1	(Finland) Keke Rosberg	Williams-Ford	G	44	+ 1 lap	12	
11	34	(Venezuela) Johnny Cecotto	Theodore-Ford	G	44	+ 1 lap	22	
12	4	(United States) Danny Sullivan	Tyrrell-Ford	G	43	+ 2 laps	21	
13	5	(Brazil) Nelson Piquet	Brabham-BMW	MI	42	Fire	4	
DSQ	8	(Austria) Niki Lauda	McLaren-Ford	MI	44	Reversed in pits	18	
Ret	16	(United States) Eddie Cheever	Renault	MI	38	Fuel system	6	
Ret	32	(Italy) Piercarlo Ghinzani	Osella-Alfa Romeo	MI	34	Oil leak	26	
Ret	26	(Brazil) Raul Boesel	Ligier-Ford	MI	27	Engine	25	
Ret	23	(Italy) Mauro Baldi	Alfa Romeo	MI	24	Turbo	7	
Ret	36	(Italy) Bruno Giacomelli	Toleman-Hart	P	19	Turbo	10	
Ret	35	(United Kingdom) Derek Warwick	Toleman-Hart	P	17	Engine	9	
Ret	40	(Sweden) Stefan Johansson	Spirit-Honda	G	11	Engine	13	
Ret	27	(France) Patrick Tambay	Ferrari	G	11	Engine	1	
Ret	11	(Italy) Elio de Angelis	Lotus-Renault	P	10	Engine	11	
Ret	3	(Italy) Michele Alboreto	Tyrrell-Ford	G	4	Fuel pump	16	
Ret	12	(United Kingdom) Nigel Mansell	Lotus-Renault	P	1	Engine	17	
Ret	33	(Colombia) Roberto Guerrero	Theodore-Ford	G	0	Engine	24	
DNQ	17	(United Kingdom) Kenny Acheson	RAM-Ford	P				
DNQ	31	(Italy) Corrado Fabi	Osella-Alfa Romeo	MI				
DNQ	9	(West Germany) Manfred Winkelhock	ATS-BMW	G				

== Championship standings after the race ==
Drivers' Championship standings

Pos	Driver	Points
1	(France) Alain Prost	42
2	(Brazil) Nelson Piquet	33
3	(France) Patrick Tambay	31
4	(France) René Arnoux	28
5	(Finland) Keke Rosberg	25

Constructors' Championship standings

Pos	Constructor	Points
1	(Italy) Ferrari	59
2	(France) Renault	56
3	(United Kingdom) Brabham-BMW	37
4	(United Kingdom) Williams-Ford	36
5	(United Kingdom) McLaren-Ford	29

- Note: Only the top five positions are included for both sets of standings.

Previous race: 1983 British Grand Prix	FIA Formula One World Championship; 1983 season	Next race: 1983 Austrian Grand Prix
Previous race: 1982 German Grand Prix	German Grand Prix	Next race: 1984 German Grand Prix
