= Huub Rothengatter =

Dutch racing driver (born 1954)

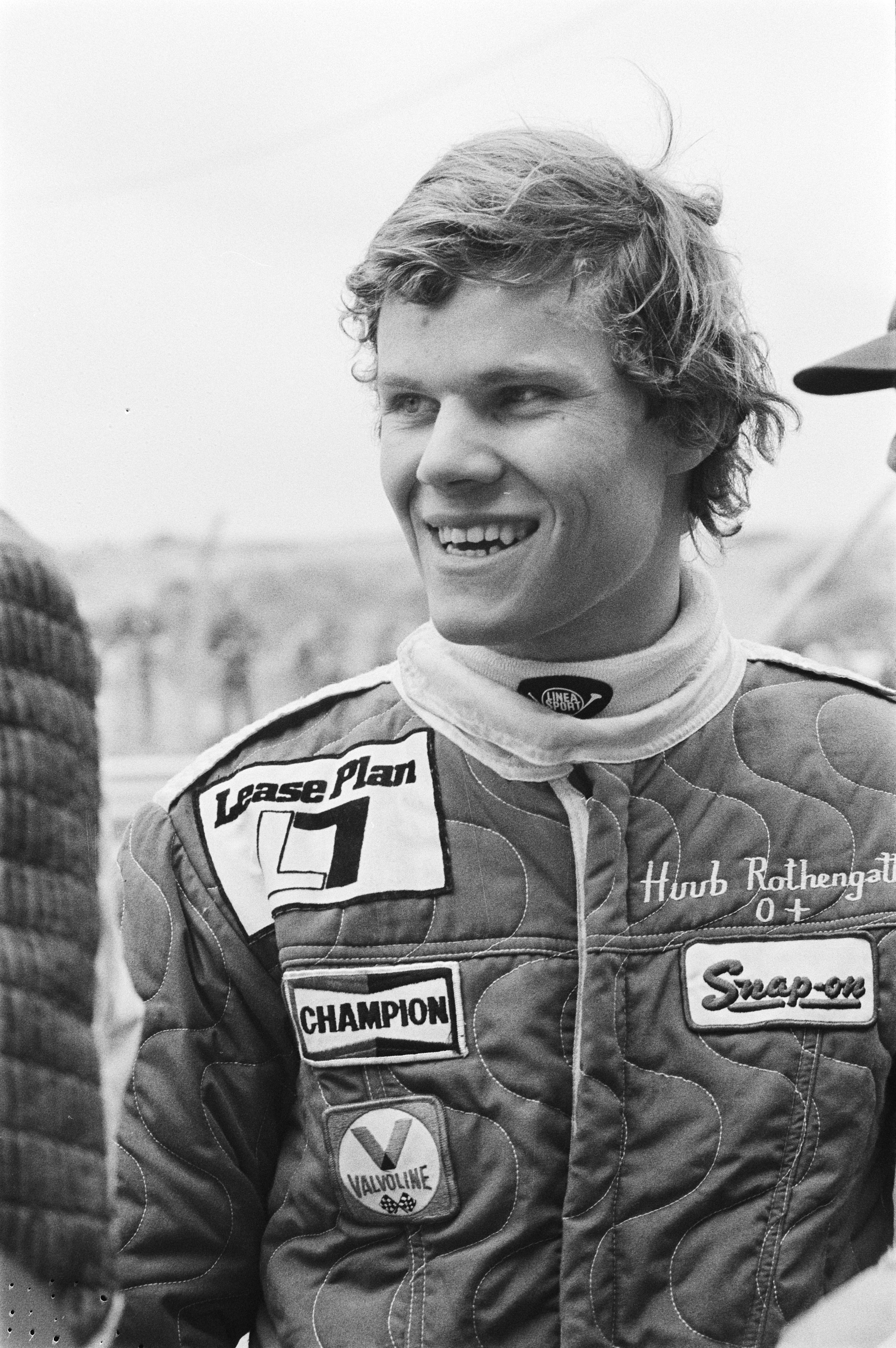
- Rothengatter in 1977
- Born: Hubertus Rothengatter; 8 October 1954 (age 72); Bussum, Netherlands

Formula One World Championship career
- Nationality: (Netherlands) Dutch
- Active years: 1984–1986
- Team(s): Spirit, Osella, Zakspeed
- Entries: 30 (25 starts)
- Championships: 0
- Wins: 0
- Podiums: 0
- Career points: 0
- Pole positions: 0
- Fastest laps: 0
- First entry: 1984 Canadian Grand Prix
- Last entry: 1986 Australian Grand Prix

Hubertus "Huub" Rothengatter (born 8 October 1954) is a former racing driver from the Netherlands. He participated in 30 Formula One (F1) Grands Prix, debuting on 17 June 1984. He scored no championship points. He drove for Spirit, Osella and Zakspeed.

Rothengatter later entered into sports management, as a manager for Dutch F1 driver Jos Verstappen.

Rothengatter is co-founder of EVBox.

== Racing record ==
=== Complete European Formula Two Championship results ===
(key) (Races in bold indicate pole position; races in italics indicate fastest lap)

Year	Entrant	Chassis	Engine	1	2	3	4	5	6	7	8	9	10	11	12	Pos.	Pts
1979	Racing Team Holland	Chevron B48	BMW	SIL; 8	HOC; Ret	THR; 6	NÜR; 5	VLL; Ret	MUG; Ret	PAU; DNQ	HOC; Ret	ZAN; 12	PER; 8	MIS; Ret	DON; 13	18th	3
1980	Docking Spitzley Racing	Toleman TG280	Hart	THR; 6	HOC; 5	NÜR; 6	VLL; 7	PAU; Ret	SIL; 5	ZOL; 1	MUG; Ret	ZAN; 7	PER; 4	MIS; 4	HOC; 13	7th	21
1981	Lista Racing Team	March 802	BMW	SIL	HOC	THR	NÜR	VLL	MUG	PAU	PER; 2	SPA; 13	DON; 8	MIS; 11	MAN; Ret	12th	6

=== Complete World Sportscar Championship results ===
(key) (Races in bold indicate pole position) (Races in italics indicate fastest lap)

Year	Entrant	Class	Chassis	Engine	1	2	3	4	5	6	7	8	9	10	11	Pos.	Pts
1983	Porsche Kremer Racing	C	Porsche CK5	Porsche Type-935 2.8 F6t	MNZ	SIL	NÜR	LMS	SPA; DNS	FUJ	KYA					NC	0
1984	Procar Automobil AG	C1	Sehcar C830	Porsche Type-935 2.6 F6t	MNZ; DNS	SIL; 15	LMS	NÜR	BRH	MOS	SPA	IMO	FUJ	KYA	SAN	NC	0

=== Complete Formula One results ===
(key)

Year	Team	Chassis	Engine	1	2	3	4	5	6	7	8	9	10	11	12	13	14	15	16	WDC	Pts
1984	Spirit Racing	Spirit 101	Hart 415T 1.5 L4t	BRA	RSA	BEL	SMR	FRA	MON	CAN; NC		DAL; Ret	GBR; NC	GER; 9	AUT; NC	NED; Ret	ITA; 8	EUR	POR	NC	0
1984	Spirit Racing	Spirit 101C	Ford Cosworth DFV 3.0 V8								DET; DNQ									NC	0
1985	Osella Squadra Corse	Osella FA1G	Alfa Romeo 890T 1.5 V8t	BRA	POR	SMR	MON	CAN	DET	FRA	GBR	GER; Ret	AUT; 9	NED; NC	ITA; Ret		EUR; DNQ	RSA; Ret	AUS; 7	NC	0
1985	Osella Squadra Corse	Osella FA1F	Alfa Romeo 890T 1.5 V8t													BEL; NC				NC	0
1986	Zakspeed Racing	Zakspeed 861	Zakspeed 1500/4 1.5 L4t	BRA	ESP	SMR; Ret	MON; DNQ	BEL; Ret	CAN; 12	DET; DNS	FRA; Ret	GBR; Ret	GER; Ret	HUN; Ret	AUT; 8	ITA; Ret	POR; Ret	MEX; DNS	AUS; Ret	NC	0

== Sources ==
- F1 Rejects biography
