= Gordon Coppuck =

British engineer and car designer (born 1936)

- Born: 8 December 1936 (age 89); Fleet, Hampshire
- Occupations: Motorsport engineer and designer
- Known for: Formula One; (March, McLaren, Spirit)
- Notable work: Co-founder Spirit Racing

Gordon Coppuck (born 8 December 1936 in Fleet, Hampshire) is a British racing car designer who was chief designer for McLaren and later worked for March and co-founded Spirit.

Born in December 1936, he attended Queen Mary's School for Boys before becoming an apprentice at the National Gas Turbine Establishment (NGTE). In 1965 he followed his ex NGTE colleague Robin Herd to McLaren, working as his assistant. In 1971 he became chief designer at McLaren, responsible for various models including the Indianapolis 500 M16 and world championship winning M23. When McLaren merged with Ron Dennis's Project Four in 1980, Coppuck departed, rejoining Herd at March. The following year he founded Spirit with March's Formula Two team manager John Wickham. Spirit raced in Formula Two and then Formula One before Coppuck returned to March. Coppuck's nephew Frank Coppuck is also a racing car designer.
