= 1984 Dutch Grand Prix =

- Race 13 of 16 in the 1984 Formula One World Championship
- The Zandvoort Circuit (1980–1989)

Race details
- Date: 26 August 1984
- Official name: XXXI Grote Prijs van Nederland
- Location: Circuit Zandvoort; Zandvoort, Netherlands
- Course: Permanent racing facility
- Course length: 4.252 km (2.642 miles)
- Distance: 71 laps, 301.892 km (187.582 miles)
- Weather: Sunny

Pole position
Driver	(France) Alain Prost	McLaren-TAG
- Time: 1:13.567

Fastest lap
Driver	(France) René Arnoux	Ferrari
- Time: 1:19.465 on lap 64

Podium
First	(France) Alain Prost	McLaren-TAG
Second	(Austria) Niki Lauda	McLaren-TAG
Third	(United Kingdom) Nigel Mansell	Lotus-Renault

The 1984 Dutch Grand Prix was a Formula One motor race held at Zandvoort on 26 August 1984. It was the thirteenth race of the 1984 Formula One World Championship.

The 71-lap race was won by Frenchman Alain Prost, driving a McLaren-TAG, after he started from pole position. Brazilian Nelson Piquet led the first ten laps in his Brabham-BMW before his oil pressure failed, after which Prost led the remainder of the race. His Austrian teammate Niki Lauda finished second, with Briton Nigel Mansell third in a Lotus-Renault after fighting for the position with his own teammate Elio de Angelis who finished 4th. At the end of the race de Angelis was unable to challenge his teammate as he was lapped by Prost with 3 laps to go while Mansell had managed to stay ahead of the McLaren.

The 1-2 finish secured the Constructors' Championship for McLaren, their first since 1974.

Before the race, it was rumoured that Ayrton Senna would break his contract with the Toleman team and join Lotus on a 3-year contract from 1985. When this move was announced two days after the race, Toleman management were angered as Senna had not informed them of his intentions as per the requirements of his contract, and as a result they suspended him from the next race in Italy. It was also correctly rumoured that, with Jacques Laffite already known to be leaving Williams at the end of the season to return to Ligier, team owner Frank Williams had signed Mansell for 1985 alongside Keke Rosberg after his original choice Derek Warwick had decided to stay with the Renault team.

With the Tyrrell team excluded from the championship (and its pending appeal to be heard before the next race in Italy allowing them to be starters in Holland), the race had 27 starters with Dutch driver Huub Rothengatter driving the Spirit-Hart starting in last place. For his home race, the Spirit was painted in Dutch racing orange.

== Classification ==
=== Qualifying ===
Pos	No	Driver	Constructor	Q1	Q2	Gap
1	7	(France) Alain Prost	McLaren-TAG	1:14.946	1:13.567	
2	1	(Brazil) Nelson Piquet	Brabham-BMW	1:13.872	1:13.953	+0.305
3	11	(Italy) Elio de Angelis	Lotus-Renault	1:14.027	1:13.883	+0.316
4	16	(United Kingdom) Derek Warwick	Renault	1:15.184	1:14.405	+0.838
5	15	(France) Patrick Tambay	Renault	1:17.013	1:14.566	+0.999
6	8	(Austria) Niki Lauda	McLaren-TAG	1:15.556	1:14.866	+1.299
7	6	(Finland) Keke Rosberg	Williams-Honda	1:15.137	1:15.117	+1.550
8	5	(France) Jacques Laffite	Williams-Honda	1:16.659	1:15.231	+1.664
9	27	(Italy) Michele Alboreto	Ferrari	1:16.248	1:15.264	+1.697
10	2	(Italy) Teo Fabi	Brabham-BMW	1:16.607	1:15.338	+1.771
11	18	(Belgium) Thierry Boutsen	Arrows-BMW	1:16.595	1:15.735	+2.168
12	12	(United Kingdom) Nigel Mansell	Lotus-Renault	1:16.533	1:15.811	+2.244
13	19	(Brazil) Ayrton Senna	Toleman-Hart	1:16.951	1:15.960	+2.393
14	26	(Italy) Andrea de Cesaris	Ligier-Renault	1:17.897	1:16.070	+2.503
15	28	(France) René Arnoux	Ferrari	1:16.121	1:16.200	+2.554
16	14	(West Germany) Manfred Winkelhock	ATS-BMW	1:17.760	1:16.450	+2.883
17	23	(United States) Eddie Cheever	Alfa Romeo	1:16.991	1:17.855	+3.424
18	22	(Italy) Riccardo Patrese	Alfa Romeo	1:17.124	1:17.402	+3.557
19	17	(Switzerland) Marc Surer	Arrows-BMW	1:17.534	1:17.368	+3.801
20	25	(France) François Hesnault	Ligier-Renault	1:18.469	1:17.905	+4.338
21	24	(Italy) Piercarlo Ghinzani	Osella-Alfa Romeo	1:22.472	1:19.454	+5.887
22	10	(United Kingdom) Jonathan Palmer	RAM-Hart	1:19.849	1:19.598	+6.031
23	30	(Austria) Jo Gartner	Osella-Alfa Romeo	1:21.655	1:20.017	+6.450
24	4	(West Germany) Stefan Bellof	Tyrrell-Ford	1:20.861	1:20.092	+6.525
25	3	(Sweden) Stefan Johansson	Tyrrell-Ford	1:20.959	1:20.236	+6.669
26	9	(France) Philippe Alliot	RAM-Hart	1:21.387	1:20.270	+6.703
27	21	(Netherlands) Huub Rothengatter	Spirit-Hart	1:24.771	1:21.063	+7.496

=== Race ===
Pos	No	Driver	Constructor	Laps	Time/Retired	Grid	Points
1	7	(France) Alain Prost	McLaren-TAG	71	1:37:21.468	1	9
2	8	(Austria) Niki Lauda	McLaren-TAG	71	+ 10.283	6	6
3	12	(United Kingdom) Nigel Mansell	Lotus-Renault	71	+ 1:19.544	12	4
4	11	(Italy) Elio de Angelis	Lotus-Renault	70	+ 1 lap	3	3
5	2	(Italy) Teo Fabi	Brabham-BMW	70	+ 1 lap	10	2
6	15	(France) Patrick Tambay	Renault	70	+ 1 lap	5	1
7	25	(France) François Hesnault	Ligier-Renault	69	+ 2 laps	20	
8	6	(Finland) Keke Rosberg	Williams-Honda	68	Out of fuel	7	
9	10	(United Kingdom) Jonathan Palmer	RAM-Hart	67	+ 4 laps	22	
10	9	(France) Philippe Alliot	RAM-Hart	67	+ 4 laps	26	
11	28	(France) René Arnoux	Ferrari	66	Electrical	15	
12	30	(Austria) Jo Gartner	Osella-Alfa Romeo	66	+ 5 laps	23	
13	23	(United States) Eddie Cheever	Alfa Romeo	65	Out of fuel	17	
DSQ	4	(West Germany) Stefan Bellof	Tyrrell-Ford	69	Illegal fuel and ballast	24	
DSQ	3	(Sweden) Stefan Johansson	Tyrrell-Ford	69	Illegal fuel and ballast	25	
Ret	18	(Belgium) Thierry Boutsen	Arrows-BMW	59	Accident	11	
Ret	21	(Netherlands) Huub Rothengatter	Spirit-Hart	53	Throttle	27	
Ret	22	(Italy) Riccardo Patrese	Alfa Romeo	51	Engine	18	
Ret	26	(Italy) Andrea de Cesaris	Ligier-Renault	31	Engine	14	
Ret	5	(France) Jacques Laffite	Williams-Honda	23	Engine	8	
Ret	16	(United Kingdom) Derek Warwick	Renault	23	Spun off	4	
Ret	14	(West Germany) Manfred Winkelhock	ATS-BMW	22	Spun off	16	
Ret	19	(Brazil) Ayrton Senna	Toleman-Hart	19	Engine	13	
Ret	17	(Switzerland) Marc Surer	Arrows-BMW	17	Wheel	19	
Ret	1	(Brazil) Nelson Piquet	Brabham-BMW	10	Oil pressure	2	
Ret	24	(Italy) Piercarlo Ghinzani	Osella-Alfa Romeo	8	Fuel pump	21	
Ret	27	(Italy) Michele Alboreto	Ferrari	7	Engine	9	

== Championship standings after the race ==
- **Bold text** indicates the World Champions.

Drivers' Championship standings

Pos	Driver	Points
1	(Austria) Niki Lauda	54
2	(France) Alain Prost	52.5
3	(Italy) Elio de Angelis	29.5
4	(France) René Arnoux	24.5
5	(Brazil) Nelson Piquet	24

Constructors' Championship standings

Pos	Constructor	Points
1	(United Kingdom) **McLaren-TAG**	106.5
2	(United Kingdom) Lotus-Renault	42.5
3	(Italy) Ferrari	39.5
4	(France) Renault	33
5	(United Kingdom) Brabham-BMW	32

- Note: Only the top five positions are included for both sets of standings. Points accurate at final declaration of results. Tyrrell's points were subsequently reallocated.

Previous race: 1984 Austrian Grand Prix	FIA Formula One World Championship; 1984 season	Next race: 1984 Italian Grand Prix
Previous race: 1983 Dutch Grand Prix	Dutch Grand Prix	Next race: 1985 Dutch Grand Prix
