= 1984 Austrian Grand Prix =

- Race 12 of 16 in the 1984 Formula One World Championship
- The Österreichring (last modified in 1977)

Race details
- Date: 19 August 1984
- Official name: XXII Holiday Großer Preis von Österreich
- Location: Österreichring, Spielberg, Styria, Austria
- Course: Permanent racing facility
- Course length: 5.942 km (3.692 miles)
- Distance: 51 laps, 303.042 km (188.292 miles)
- Weather: Dry

Pole position
Driver	(Brazil) Nelson Piquet	Brabham-BMW
- Time: 1:26.173

Fastest lap
Driver	(Austria) Niki Lauda	McLaren-TAG
- Time: 1:32.882 on lap 23

Podium
First	(Austria) Niki Lauda	McLaren-TAG
Second	(Brazil) Nelson Piquet	Brabham-BMW
Third	(Italy) Michele Alboreto	Ferrari

The 1984 Austrian Grand Prix was a Formula One motor race held at Österreichring on 19 August 1984. It was the twelfth race of the 1984 Formula One World Championship, and the 400th Grand Prix held as part of the World Championship since it began in 1950.

The 51-lap race was won by local driver Niki Lauda, driving a McLaren-TAG. Brazilian Nelson Piquet finished second in a Brabham-BMW, having started from pole position, with Italian Michele Alboreto third in a Ferrari. The win, Lauda's fourth of the season, gave him the lead of the Drivers' Championship by 4.5 points from his French teammate Alain Prost, who spun out shortly after half distance.

== Report ==
The race had to be stopped soon after the first start, due to a problem with the starting lights which caused chaos among the drivers with Niki Lauda claiming that he saw "Red, green, yellow then red again". This caused 3rd fastest qualifier Elio de Angelis to hesitate badly off the line and his Lotus-Renault was almost hit from behind by several cars and saw the Toleman-Hart of Ayrton Senna in 4th place by the time they reached Hella-Licht after starting 10th. On the formation lap for the re-start, pole sitter Piquet, who had seen the McLarens change tyres on the grid, angered the other drivers when he led the field on an extremely slow lap in an effort to not allow Prost or Lauda to scrub in their new Michelin rubber.

Alain Prost, Lauda's team mate and the World Championship leader going into the race, failed to finish after spinning off on oil at the Jochen Rindt Curve on lap 28, that came from the Lotus of Elio de Angelis when his Renault engine failed moments before Prost retired (de Angelis later received criticism for continuing to drive his car on the racing line while dropping oil). Prost had been running a close second behind Piquet at the time of his spin. Piquet came upon the oil of de Angelis first and managed to keep his car from sliding off despite a twitch on the oil. Prost however was having gear selection problems and hit the oil with one hand on his steering wheel and the other on his gear lever. This saw him spin off and clout the outside guardrail almost nose first, the resulting suspension damage causing his immediate retirement. Lauda moved into second and then passed Piquet for the lead, the Brazilian suffering tyre trouble. Despite a brief gearbox problem where for a few hundred metres he could not find a gear before eventually finding 4th coming out of the Texaco Schikane, Lauda went on to win his home race by 23 seconds largely only having 3rd and 5th gears left in his McLaren's gearbox.

Another Austrian driver Gerhard Berger, who would go on to win 10 Grands Prix before retiring at the end of the 1997 season, made his Formula One debut at the Österreichring, finishing 12th and last in his ATS-BMW. The third Austrian in the race, Jo Gartner, retired after only 6 laps with engine troubles in his Osella-Alfa Romeo.

Both Renaults retired with engine failures, Derek Warwick on lap 18 and Patrick Tambay on lap 43.

== Classification ==
=== Qualifying ===
Pos	No	Driver	Constructor	Q1	Q2	Gap
1	1	(Brazil) Nelson Piquet	Brabham-BMW	1:26.928	1:26.173	
2	7	(France) Alain Prost	McLaren-TAG	1:26.203	1:27.098	+0.030
3	11	(Italy) Elio de Angelis	Lotus-Renault	1:27.531	1:26.318	+0.145
4	8	(Austria) Niki Lauda	McLaren-TAG	1:26.715	1:27.312	+0.542
5	15	(France) Patrick Tambay	Renault	1:27.748	1:26.748	+0.575
6	16	(United Kingdom) Derek Warwick	Renault	1:27.928	1:27.123	+0.950
7	2	(Italy) Teo Fabi	Brabham-BMW	1:29.893	1:27.201	+1.028
8	12	(United Kingdom) Nigel Mansell	Lotus-Renault	1:28.430	1:27.558	+1.385
9	6	(Finland) Keke Rosberg	Williams-Honda	1:28.760	1:29.012	+2.587
10	19	(Brazil) Ayrton Senna	Toleman-Hart	1:29.463	1:29.200	+3.027
11	5	(France) Jacques Laffite	Williams-Honda	1:29.228	1:31.498	+3.055
12	27	(Italy) Michele Alboreto	Ferrari	1:29.694	1:30.000	+3.541
13	22	(Italy) Riccardo Patrese	Alfa Romeo	1:30.966	1:30.736	+4.563
14	14	(West Germany) Manfred Winkelhock	ATS-BMW	1:33.276	1:30.853	+4.680
15	28	(France) René Arnoux	Ferrari	1:31.003	1:31.313	+4.830
16	23	(United States) Eddie Cheever	Alfa Romeo	1:31.250	1:31.045	+4.872
17	18	(Belgium) Thierry Boutsen	Arrows-BMW	1:31.255	1:31.189	+5.016
18	26	(Italy) Andrea de Cesaris	Ligier-Renault	1:36.771	1:31.588	+5.415
19	17	(Switzerland) Marc Surer	Arrows-BMW	1:31.701	1:31.655	+5.482
20	31	(Austria) Gerhard Berger	ATS-BMW	1:31.904	No time	+5.731
21	25	(France) François Hesnault	Ligier-Renault	1:32.582	1:32.270	+6.097
22	30	(Austria) Jo Gartner	Osella-Alfa Romeo	1:35.212	1:33.019	+6.846
23	24	(Italy) Piercarlo Ghinzani	Osella-Alfa Romeo	1:33.172	No time	+6.999
24	10	(United Kingdom) Jonathan Palmer	RAM-Hart	1:34.622	1:34.128	+7.955
25	9	(France) Philippe Alliot	RAM-Hart	1:34.495	1:44.304	+8.322
26	21	(Netherlands) Huub Rothengatter	Spirit-Hart	1:00:43.900	1:35.605	+9.432
27	3	(Sweden) Stefan Johansson	Tyrrell-Ford	1:37.292	1:36.282	+10.109
28	4	(West Germany) Stefan Bellof	Tyrrell-Ford	1:37.535	1:37.893	+11.362

=== Race ===
Pos	No	Driver	Constructor	Laps	Time/Retired	Grid	Points
1	8	(Austria) Niki Lauda	McLaren-TAG	51	1:21:12.851	4	9
2	1	(Brazil) Nelson Piquet	Brabham-BMW	51	+ 23.525	1	6
3	27	(Italy) Michele Alboreto	Ferrari	51	+ 48.998	12	4
4	2	(Italy) Teo Fabi	Brabham-BMW	51	+ 56.312	7	3
5	18	(Belgium) Thierry Boutsen	Arrows-BMW	50	+ 1 Lap	17	2
6	17	(Switzerland) Marc Surer	Arrows-BMW	50	+ 1 Lap	19	1
7	28	(France) René Arnoux	Ferrari	50	+ 1 Lap	15	
8	25	(France) François Hesnault	Ligier-Renault	49	+ 2 Laps	21	
9	10	(United Kingdom) Jonathan Palmer	RAM-Hart	49	+ 2 Laps	24	
10	22	(Italy) Riccardo Patrese	Alfa Romeo	48	Out of Fuel	13	
11	9	(France) Philippe Alliot	RAM-Hart	48	+ 3 Laps	25	
12	31	(Austria) Gerhard Berger	ATS-BMW	48	Gearbox	20	
Ret	15	(France) Patrick Tambay	Renault	42	Engine	5	
Ret	19	(Brazil) Ayrton Senna	Toleman-Hart	35	Oil Pressure	10	
Ret	12	(United Kingdom) Nigel Mansell	Lotus-Renault	32	Engine	8	
Ret	7	(France) Alain Prost	McLaren-TAG	28	Spun Off/Gearbox	2	
Ret	11	(Italy) Elio de Angelis	Lotus-Renault	28	Engine	3	
NC	21	(Netherlands) Huub Rothengatter	Spirit-Hart	23	+ 28 Laps	26	
Ret	23	(United States) Eddie Cheever	Alfa Romeo	18	Engine	16	
Ret	16	(United Kingdom) Derek Warwick	Renault	17	Engine	6	
Ret	26	(Italy) Andrea de Cesaris	Ligier-Renault	15	Injection	18	
Ret	6	(Finland) Keke Rosberg	Williams-Honda	15	Handling	9	
Ret	5	(France) Jacques Laffite	Williams-Honda	12	Engine	11	
Ret	30	(Austria) Jo Gartner	Osella-Alfa Romeo	6	Engine	22	
Ret	24	(Italy) Piercarlo Ghinzani	Osella-Alfa Romeo	4	Gearbox	23	
DNS	14	(West Germany) Manfred Winkelhock	ATS-BMW	0	Gearbox	14	
DNQ	3	(Sweden) Stefan Johansson	Tyrrell-Ford				
EX	4	(West Germany) Stefan Bellof	Tyrrell-Ford				

== Championship standings after the race ==
Drivers' Championship standings

Pos	Driver	Points
1	(Austria) Niki Lauda	48
2	(France) Alain Prost	43.5
3	(Italy) Elio de Angelis	26.5
4	(France) René Arnoux	24.5
5	(Brazil) Nelson Piquet	24

Constructors' Championship standings

Pos	Constructor	Points
1	(United Kingdom) McLaren-TAG	91.5
2	(Italy) Ferrari	39.5
3	(United Kingdom) Lotus-Renault	35.5
4	(France) Renault	32
5	(United Kingdom) Brabham-BMW	30

- Note: Only the top five positions are included for both sets of standings. Points accurate at final declaration of results. Tyrrell's points were subsequently reallocated.

Previous race: 1984 German Grand Prix	FIA Formula One World Championship; 1984 season	Next race: 1984 Dutch Grand Prix
Previous race: 1983 Austrian Grand Prix	Austrian Grand Prix	Next race: 1985 Austrian Grand Prix
