= 1984 British Grand Prix =

- Race 10 of 16 in the 1984 Formula One World Championship

Race details
- Date: 22 July 1984
- Official name: XXXVII John Player British Grand Prix
- Location: Brands Hatch; Kent, Great Britain
- Course: Permanent racing facility
- Course length: 4.206 or 4.207 km (2.613 or 2.614 miles)
- Distance: 71 (aggregated: 11 + 60) laps, 298.626 or 298.633 or 298.697 km (185.558 or 185.562 or 185.602 miles)
- Scheduled distance: 75 laps, 315.450 or 315.457 or 315.525 km (196.012 or 196.016 or 196.058 miles)

Pole position
| Driver | (Brazil) Nelson Piquet | Brabham-BMW |
- Time: 1:10.869

Fastest lap
| Driver | (Austria) Niki Lauda | McLaren-TAG |
- Time: 1:13.191 on lap 57

Podium
| First | (Austria) Niki Lauda | McLaren-TAG |
| Second | (United Kingdom) Derek Warwick | Renault |
| Third | (Brazil) Ayrton Senna | Toleman-Hart |

The 1984 British Grand Prix (formally the XXXVII John Player British Grand Prix) was a Formula One motor race held at Brands Hatch, Kent, England on 22 July 1984. It was the tenth race of the 1984 Formula One World Championship.

The 71-lap race was won by Austrian Niki Lauda, driving a McLaren-TAG, with local driver Derek Warwick second in a Renault and Brazilian Ayrton Senna third in a Toleman-Hart. Lauda's teammate Alain Prost retired shortly after half distance with a gearbox failure, enabling Lauda to reduce the Frenchman's lead in the Drivers' Championship to 1.5 points. Niki Lauda's win for McLaren saw him become the highest point scorer in Formula One history, passing Jackie Stewart's 360 points.

== Report ==
=== Background ===
Going into the race, McLaren driver Alain Prost led the Drivers' Championship with 34.5 points. Teammate Niki Lauda was second on 24, closely followed by Lotus's Elio de Angelis on 23.5, Ferrari's René Arnoux on 22.5, Williams' Keke Rosberg on 20 and Brabham's Nelson Piquet on 18. McLaren led the Constructors' Championship with 58.5 points, comfortably ahead of Ferrari on 31.5, Lotus on 29.5, Williams on 24 and Brabham on 21.

Prior to the event, the FIA announced that the Tyrrell team would be disqualified from the World Championship for the illegal use of fuel and ballast on their cars. The ruling resulted in Tyrrell losing the 13 points they had scored in the first nine races of the season. Tyrrell owner Ken Tyrrell was granted a High Court order to allow their cars to compete in the Friday Qualifying session. As a result of his crash in the previous race at Dallas in which he broke both of his ankles, Martin Brundle was replaced in the No. 4 Tyrrell by Swedish driver Stefan Johansson.

=== Qualifying ===
Johnny Cecotto broke both legs after a heavy crash during first practice. He would never race in Formula One again. Nelson Piquet claimed pole position.

=== Race ===
Piquet was away from pole position and had built a huge gap. Down the field, Patrese, trying to make up positions in the race, made a mistake into the Druids Hairpin, with drivers reacting behind causing a multi-car pile up.

The race began with multiple incidents on the opening lap that significantly reduced the field. An Osella was forced into the barriers, a RAM somersaulted and came to rest on the grass, Eddie Cheever’s Alfa Romeo sustained rear-end damage, and Stefan Johansson’s Tyrrell was also damaged. While Johansson was able to return to the pits, Cheever retired. At the end of the first lap, 23 cars remained in the race.

At the front, Nelson Piquet led Alain Prost and Niki Lauda, with the three pulling clear of the rest of the field, which was headed by Derek Warwick. Early mechanical issues eliminated Keke Rosberg, who retired with Honda engine trouble, and Teo Fabi, whose BMW engine suffered electrical problems. Manfred Winkelhock also retired after spinning on the bottom straight.

By lap 10, the two McLarens of Prost and Lauda were applying increasing pressure to Piquet. On lap 12, Prost overtook Piquet at Paddock Bend, with Lauda following through shortly afterwards at Druids.

On the same lap, Jonathan Palmer crashed heavily exiting Clearways while running 17th. His damaged RAM came to rest in a dangerous position near the racing line. Although Palmer was uninjured, the severity and location of the wreck prompted race officials to stop the race in accordance with safety regulations.

During the stoppage, damaged barriers and tyre walls were repaired and remaining wreckage cleared. The restart was scheduled after a further 20-minute countdown. Cars lined up in the order they had held at the end of lap 11, meaning Piquet resumed from pole position and was permitted to fit new tyres.

Several cars were unable to restart. The ATS, which had been retrieved, was not allowed to rejoin as it had officially retired. Rosberg and Fabi were eligible to restart but their cars could not be repaired in time. As a result, 19 cars took the restart.

The final classification was based on the combined time of the first 11 laps and the remaining 60 laps of the restarted race, for a total distance of 71 laps instead of the scheduled 75.

Prost led the restart from Piquet and Lauda, followed by Warwick and Patrick Tambay. The leading trio again set the pace. Lauda passed Piquet on lap 29 and later inherited the lead when Prost slowed with gearbox problems on lap 38 and pitted.

Piquet remained competitive until late in the race, when his BMW engine lost turbo boost, reducing it to normally aspirated power. He dropped from second place to seventh by the finish.

Warwick capitalised on Piquet’s problems to move into second place, while Ayrton Senna delivered a notable performance for Toleman. Senna pressured Elio de Angelis for much of the race and overtook him at Paddock Bend on lap 69. De Angelis subsequently suffered turbo problems but finished, while Senna secured third place on the same lap as the winner.

Further down the order, Andrea de Cesaris spun at Druids on lap 52 but continued to finish 10th. The Ferraris of Michele Alboreto and René Arnoux finished fifth and sixth. Riccardo Patrese retired near the finish with gearbox failure, and Tambay’s Renault caught fire on the final lap but was quickly extinguished by marshals.

Renault driver Derek Warwick gave the British fans something to cheer when he finished 42 seconds behind Lauda in second place, while Cecotto's Toleman teammate Ayrton Senna finished 21 seconds behind Warwick in third, his second podium finish in just his rookie season. Lotus-Renault driver Elio de Angelis kept his championship hopes alive finishing a lap down in fourth place. He was followed by the two Ferraris of Michele Alboreto and René Arnoux in the final points positions.

Lauda's win saw him move to 33 points and with Prost failing to finish his championship lead was cut to just 1.5 points. With 67.5 points, McLaren had scored almost double the number of Constructors' points than second placed Ferrari who were on 34.5 points.

Eddie Cheever (Alfa Romeo), Philippe Alliot (RAM) and Jo Gartner (Osella) were all outed in a first lap crash which started when Riccardo Patrese lost his Alfa going into the Graham Hill Bend. The race was stopped after 11 laps to clear Jonathan Palmer's RAM.

== Classification ==
=== Qualifying ===
| Pos | No | Driver | Constructor | Q1 | Q2 | Gap |
|---|---|---|---|---|---|---|
| 1 | 1 | (Brazil) Nelson Piquet | Brabham-BMW | 1:14.568 | 1:10.869 | |
| 2 | 7 | (France) Alain Prost | McLaren-TAG | 1:11.494 | 1:11.076 | +0.207 |
| 3 | 8 | (Austria) Niki Lauda | McLaren-TAG | 1:11.598 | 1:11.344 | +0.475 |
| 4 | 11 | (Italy) Elio de Angelis | Lotus-Renault | 1:11.734 | 1:11.573 | +0.704 |
| 5 | 6 | (Finland) Keke Rosberg | Williams-Honda | 1:13.740 | 1:11.603 | +0.734 |
| 6 | 16 | (United Kingdom) Derek Warwick | Renault | 1:12.278 | 1:11.703 | +0.834 |
| 7 | 19 | (Brazil) Ayrton Senna | Toleman-Hart | 1:11.890 | 1:13.991 | +1.021 |
| 8 | 12 | (United Kingdom) Nigel Mansell | Lotus-Renault | 1:13.184 | 1:12.435 | +1.566 |
| 9 | 27 | (Italy) Michele Alboreto | Ferrari | 1:13.645 | 1:13.122 | +2.253 |
| 10 | 15 | (France) Patrick Tambay | Renault | 1:14.106 | 1:13.138 | +2.269 |
| 11 | 14 | (West Germany) Manfred Winkelhock | ATS-BMW | 1:13.713 | 1:13.374 | +2.505 |
| 12 | 18 | (Belgium) Thierry Boutsen | Arrows-BMW | 1:15.355 | 1:13.528 | +2.659 |
| 13 | 28 | (France) René Arnoux | Ferrari | 1:14.281 | 1:13.934 | +3.065 |
| 14 | 2 | (Italy) Teo Fabi | Brabham-BMW | 1:17.731 | 1:14.040 | +3.171 |
| 15 | 17 | (Switzerland) Marc Surer | Arrows-BMW | 1:17.040 | 1:14.336 | +3.467 |
| 16 | 5 | (France) Jacques Laffite | Williams-Honda | 1:14.568 | 1:26.939 | +3.699 |
| 17 | 22 | (Italy) Riccardo Patrese | Alfa Romeo | 1:14.871 | 1:14.568 | +3.699 |
| 18 | 23 | (United States) Eddie Cheever | Alfa Romeo | 1:15.113 | 1:14.609 | +3.740 |
| 19 | 26 | (Italy) Andrea de Cesaris | Ligier-Renault | 1:16.116 | 1:15.112 | +4.243 |
| 20 | 25 | (France) François Hesnault | Ligier-Renault | 1:17.384 | 1:15.837 | +4.968 |
| 21 | 24 | (Italy) Piercarlo Ghinzani | Osella-Alfa Romeo | 1:16.466 | 1:16.829 | +5.597 |
| 22 | 21 | (Netherlands) Huub Rothengatter | Spirit-Hart | 1:17.665 | 1:16.759 | +5.890 |
| 23 | 10 | (United Kingdom) Jonathan Palmer | RAM-Hart | 1:18.244 | 1:17.265 | +6.396 |
| 24 | 9 | (France) Philippe Alliot | RAM-Hart | 1:24.043 | 1:17.517 | +6.648 |
| 25 | 3 | (Sweden) Stefan Johansson | Tyrrell-Ford | 1:18.450 | 1:17.777 | +6.908 |
| 26 | 4 | (West Germany) Stefan Bellof | Tyrrell-Ford | 1:17.893 | 1:17.912 | +7.024 |
| 27 | 30 | (Austria) Jo Gartner | Osella-Alfa Romeo | 1:18.347 | 1:18.121 | +7.252 |

=== Race ===
| Pos | No | Driver | Constructor | Tyre | Laps | Time/Retired | Grid | Points |
|---|---|---|---|---|---|---|---|---|
| 1 | 8 | (Austria) Niki Lauda | McLaren-TAG | M | 71 | 1:29:28.532 | 3 | 9 |
| 2 | 16 | (United Kingdom) Derek Warwick | Renault | M | 71 | + 42.123 | 6 | 6 |
| 3 | 19 | (Brazil) Ayrton Senna | Toleman-Hart | M | 71 | + 1:03.328 | 7 | 4 |
| 4 | 11 | (Italy) Elio de Angelis | Lotus-Renault | G | 70 | + 1 lap | 4 | 3 |
| 5 | 27 | (Italy) Michele Alboreto | Ferrari | G | 70 | + 1 lap | 9 | 2 |
| 6 | 28 | (France) René Arnoux | Ferrari | G | 70 | + 1 lap | 13 | 1 |
| 7 | 1 | (Brazil) Nelson Piquet | Brabham-BMW | M | 70 | + 1 lap | 1 | |
| 8 | 15 | (France) Patrick Tambay | Renault | M | 69 | Turbo | 10 | |
| 9 | 24 | (Italy) Piercarlo Ghinzani | Osella-Alfa Romeo | P | 68 | + 3 laps | 21 | |
| 10 | 26 | (Italy) Andrea de Cesaris | Ligier-Renault | M | 68 | + 3 laps | 19 | |
| 11 | 17 | (Switzerland) Marc Surer | Arrows-BMW | G | 67 | + 4 laps | 15 | |
| 12 | 22 | (Italy) Riccardo Patrese | Alfa Romeo | G | 66 | + 5 laps | 17 | |
| DSQ | 4 | (West Germany) Stefan Bellof | Tyrrell-Ford | G | 68 | Disqualified | 26 | |
| NC | 21 | (Netherlands) Huub Rothengatter | Spirit-Hart | P | 62 | + 9 laps | 22 | |
| Ret | 25 | (France) François Hesnault | Ligier-Renault | M | 43 | Electrical | 20 | |
| Ret | 7 | (France) Alain Prost | McLaren-TAG | M | 37 | Gearbox | 2 | |
| Ret | 12 | (United Kingdom) Nigel Mansell | Lotus-Renault | G | 24 | Gearbox | 8 | |
| Ret | 18 | (Belgium) Thierry Boutsen | Arrows-BMW | G | 24 | Electrical | 12 | |
| Ret | 5 | (France) Jacques Laffite | Williams-Honda | G | 14 | Water pump | 16 | |
| Ret | 10 | (United Kingdom) Jonathan Palmer | RAM-Hart | P | 10 | Accident | 23 | |
| Ret | 2 | (Italy) Teo Fabi | Brabham-BMW | M | 9 | Electrical | 14 | |
| Ret | 14 | (West Germany) Manfred Winkelhock | ATS-BMW | P | 8 | Spun off | 11 | |
| Ret | 6 | (Finland) Keke Rosberg | Williams-Honda | G | 5 | Engine | 5 | |
| DSQ | 3 | (Sweden) Stefan Johansson | Tyrrell-Ford | G | 1 | Disqualified | 25 | |
| Ret | 23 | (United States) Eddie Cheever | Alfa Romeo | G | 0 | Accident | 18 | |
| Ret | 9 | (France) Philippe Alliot | RAM-Hart | P | 0 | Accident | 24 | |
| Ret | 30 | (Austria) Jo Gartner | Osella-Alfa Romeo | P | 0 | Accident | 27 | |
| DNQ | 20 | (Venezuela) Johnny Cecotto | Toleman-Hart | M | | Injury | | |

== Championship standings after the race ==
Drivers' Championship standings

| Pos | Driver | Points |
|---|---|---|
| 1 | (France) Alain Prost | 34.5 |
| 2 | (Austria) Niki Lauda | 33 |
| 3 | (Italy) Elio de Angelis | 26.5 |
| 4 | (France) René Arnoux | 23.5 |
| 5 | (Finland) Keke Rosberg | 20 |

Constructors' Championship standings

| Pos | Constructor | Points |
|---|---|---|
| 1 | (United Kingdom) McLaren-TAG | 67.5 |
| 2 | (Italy) Ferrari | 34.5 |
| 3 | (United Kingdom) Lotus-Renault | 32.5 |
| 4 | (France) Renault | 26 |
| 5 | (United Kingdom) Williams-Honda | 24 |

- Note: Only the top five positions are included for both sets of standings. Points accurate at final declaration of results. Tyrrell's points were subsequently reallocated.

| Previous race: 1984 Dallas Grand Prix | FIA Formula One World Championship; 1984 season | Next race: 1984 German Grand Prix |
| Previous race: 1983 British Grand Prix; Previous race at Brands Hatch: 1983 European Grand Prix | British Grand Prix | Next race: 1985 British Grand Prix; Next race at Brands Hatch: 1985 European Grand Prix |
