= 1984 German Grand Prix =

11th round of the 1984 Formula One season

- Race 11 of 16 in the 1984 Formula One World Championship

Race details
- Date: 5 August 1984
- Official name: XLVI Großer Preis von Deutschland
- Location: Hockenheimring; Hockenheim, Baden-Württemberg, West Germany
- Course: Permanent racing facility
- Course length: 6.802 km (4.227 miles)
- Distance: 44 laps, 299.068 km (185.832 miles)
- Weather: Dry

Pole position
| Driver | (France) Alain Prost | McLaren-TAG |
- Time: 1:47.012

Fastest lap
| Driver | (France) Alain Prost | McLaren-TAG |
- Time: 1:53.538 on lap 31

Podium
| First | (France) Alain Prost | McLaren-TAG |
| Second | (Austria) Niki Lauda | McLaren-TAG |
| Third | (United Kingdom) Derek Warwick | Renault |

The 1984 German Grand Prix was a Formula One motor race held at Hockenheim on 5 August 1984. It was the eleventh race of the 1984 Formula One World Championship.

The 44-lap race was won by Alain Prost, who also took pole position and set the fastest lap, driving a McLaren-TAG. Teammate Niki Lauda finished second, completing McLaren's second 1-2 finish of the season, while Derek Warwick was third in a Renault. Nigel Mansell (Lotus-Renault), Patrick Tambay (Renault) and René Arnoux (Ferrari) rounded out the top six.

== Race report ==
De Angelis took the lead from Prost at the start overtaking on the inside of the first corner. Marc Surer's Arrows-BMW had a fuel injection problem and retired at the end of Lap 1. Rosberg was climbing up the order quickly at the start, moving from 19th to 7th across the opening 5 laps. On Lap 5, Senna had a spin on the fast outward leg before the East Curve Chicane and crashed into the wall due to his rear aerofoil having collapsed, having run in fifth in the Toleman.

On Lap 7, de Angelis' Renault engine in the Lotus blew up and Prost went into the lead, de Angelis trying to drive the car into the pits. Piquet soon overtook Prost and went into the lead. Lauda was following behind in third place, having started off carefully, and had passed Rosberg and Warwick as the race settled down. Within a lap the two Williams failed. Laffite came into the pits with smoke pouring from an exhaust pipe and signs of a disintegrated piston coming out of the pipe, and Rosberg coasted to a stop out on the circuit with an electrical fault.

Barely after the retirement of both Williams cars, the second RAM entry also withdrew from the race. Shortly thereafter, Piercarlo Ghinzani's Osella was forced into the pit lane due to a fire originating around the right-hand turbocharger of its Alfa Romeo V8 engine. Michele Alboreto retired with an electrical failure, while Riccardo Patrese exited the race as a result of a gearbox malfunction.

The high-speed nature of the circuit, combined with three chicanes that required repeated heavy braking and rapid acceleration, placed considerable mechanical strain on the field and contributed to the high rate of retirements. On lap 22, Nelson Piquet began experiencing difficulties with gear selection and was forced to slow significantly, allowing both Alain Prost and Niki Lauda to pass.

Piquet's Brabham was fitted with a special six-speed gearbox configuration, consisting of five conventional ratios and an overdrive top gear. Pqiuet encountered problems engaging second, fourth, and sixth gears. After completing one additional lap without resolving the issue, he entered the pit lane at the end of lap 23 and retired from the race.

The race having settled down, Prost and Lauda secured a 1-2 for the McLaren team. Derek Warwick came third, his final podium finish in Formula One. Prost extended his championship standings by three points to Lauda.

== Classification ==
=== Qualifying ===
| Pos | No | Driver | Constructor | Q1 | Q2 | Gap |
|---|---|---|---|---|---|---|
| 1 | 7 | (France) Alain Prost | McLaren-TAG | 1:49.439 | 1:47.012 | |
| 2 | 11 | (Italy) Elio de Angelis | Lotus-Renault | 1:48.033 | 1:47.065 | +0.053 |
| 3 | 16 | (United Kingdom) Derek Warwick | Renault | 1:48.576 | 1:48.382 | +1.370 |
| 4 | 15 | (France) Patrick Tambay | Renault | 1:51.414 | 1:48.425 | +1.413 |
| 5 | 1 | (Brazil) Nelson Piquet | Brabham-BMW | 1:48.698 | 1:48.584 | +1.572 |
| 6 | 27 | (Italy) Michele Alboreto | Ferrari | 1:49.782 | 1:48.847 | +1.835 |
| 7 | 8 | (Austria) Niki Lauda | McLaren-TAG | 1:48.912 | 1:49.004 | +1.900 |
| 8 | 2 | (Italy) Teo Fabi | Brabham-BMW | 1:51.693 | 1:49.302 | +2.290 |
| 9 | 19 | (Brazil) Ayrton Senna | Toleman-Hart | 1:49.395 | 1:49.831 | +2.383 |
| 10 | 28 | (France) René Arnoux | Ferrari | 1:50.830 | 1:49.857 | +2.845 |
| 11 | 26 | (Italy) Andrea de Cesaris | Ligier-Renault | 1:50.338 | 1:50.117 | +3.105 |
| 12 | 5 | (France) Jacques Laffite | Williams-Honda | 1:51.428 | 1:50.511 | +3.499 |
| 13 | 14 | (West Germany) Manfred Winkelhock | ATS-BMW | 1:51.697 | 1:50.686 | +3.674 |
| 14 | 17 | (Switzerland) Marc Surer | Arrows-BMW | 1:56.450 | 1:51.475 | +4.463 |
| 15 | 18 | (Belgium) Thierry Boutsen | Arrows-BMW | 1:52.144 | 1:51.551 | +4.539 |
| 16 | 12 | (United Kingdom) Nigel Mansell | Lotus-Renault | 1:52.958 | 1:51.715 | +4.703 |
| 17 | 25 | (France) François Hesnault | Ligier-Renault | 1:53.985 | 1:51.872 | +4.860 |
| 18 | 23 | (United States) Eddie Cheever | Alfa Romeo | 1:54.802 | 1:51.950 | +4.938 |
| 19 | 6 | (Finland) Keke Rosberg | Williams-Honda | 2:12.229 | 1:52.003 | +4.991 |
| 20 | 22 | (Italy) Riccardo Patrese | Alfa Romeo | 1:52.769 | 1:54.665 | +5.757 |
| 21 | 24 | (Italy) Piercarlo Ghinzani | Osella-Alfa Romeo | 1:59.505 | 1:54.546 | +7.534 |
| 22 | 9 | (France) Philippe Alliot | RAM-Hart | 1:55.505 | 1:55.795 | +8.493 |
| 23 | 30 | (Austria) Jo Gartner | Osella-Alfa Romeo | 1:58.457 | 1:55.594 | +8.582 |
| 24 | 21 | (Netherlands) Huub Rothengatter | Spirit-Hart | 1:56.112 | 2:00.118 | +9.100 |
| 25 | 10 | (United Kingdom) Jonathan Palmer | RAM-Hart | 1:56.797 | 46:43.220 | +9.785 |
| 26 | 3 | (Sweden) Stefan Johansson | Tyrrell-Ford | 2:00.268 | 1:59.461 | +12.449 |
| DNQ | 4 | (New Zealand) Mike Thackwell | Tyrrell-Ford | 2:01.320 | 1:59.516 | +12.504 |

=== Race ===
| Pos | No | Driver | Constructor | Laps | Time/Retired | Grid | Points |
|---|---|---|---|---|---|---|---|
| 1 | 7 | (France) Alain Prost | McLaren-TAG | 44 | 1:24:43.210 | 1 | 9 |
| 2 | 8 | (Austria) Niki Lauda | McLaren-TAG | 44 | + 3.149 | 7 | 6 |
| 3 | 16 | (United Kingdom) Derek Warwick | Renault | 44 | + 36.423 | 3 | 4 |
| 4 | 12 | (United Kingdom) Nigel Mansell | Lotus-Renault | 44 | + 51.663 | 16 | 3 |
| 5 | 15 | (France) Patrick Tambay | Renault | 44 | + 1:11.949 | 4 | 2 |
| 6 | 28 | (France) René Arnoux | Ferrari | 43 | + 1 Lap | 10 | 1 |
| 7 | 26 | (Italy) Andrea de Cesaris | Ligier-Renault | 43 | + 1 Lap | 11 | |
| 8 | 25 | (France) François Hesnault | Ligier-Renault | 43 | + 1 Lap | 17 | |
| 9 | 21 | (Netherlands) Huub Rothengatter | Spirit-Hart | 40 | + 4 Laps | 24 | |
| DSQ | 3 | (Sweden) Stefan Johansson | Tyrrell-Ford | 42 | Disqualified | 26 | |
| Ret | 14 | (West Germany) Manfred Winkelhock | ATS-BMW | 31 | Gearbox | 13 | |
| Ret | 23 | (United States) Eddie Cheever | Alfa Romeo | 29 | Engine | 18 | |
| Ret | 2 | (Italy) Teo Fabi | Brabham-BMW | 28 | Turbo | 8 | |
| Ret | 1 | (Brazil) Nelson Piquet | Brabham-BMW | 23 | Gearbox | 5 | |
| Ret | 22 | (Italy) Riccardo Patrese | Alfa Romeo | 16 | Fuel System | 20 | |
| Ret | 24 | (Italy) Piercarlo Ghinzani | Osella-Alfa Romeo | 14 | Electrical | 21 | |
| Ret | 30 | (Austria) Jo Gartner | Osella-Alfa Romeo | 13 | Turbo | 23 | |
| Ret | 27 | (Italy) Michele Alboreto | Ferrari | 13 | Engine | 6 | |
| Ret | 10 | (United Kingdom) Jonathan Palmer | RAM-Hart | 11 | Turbo | 25 | |
| Ret | 6 | (Finland) Keke Rosberg | Williams-Honda | 10 | Electrical | 19 | |
| Ret | 5 | (France) Jacques Laffite | Williams-Honda | 10 | Engine | 12 | |
| Ret | 18 | (Belgium) Thierry Boutsen | Arrows-BMW | 8 | Engine | 15 | |
| Ret | 11 | (Italy) Elio de Angelis | Lotus-Renault | 8 | Turbo | 2 | |
| Ret | 9 | (France) Philippe Alliot | RAM-Hart | 7 | Overheating | 22 | |
| Ret | 19 | (Brazil) Ayrton Senna | Toleman-Hart | 4 | Rear Wing | 9 | |
| Ret | 17 | (Switzerland) Marc Surer | Arrows-BMW | 1 | Turbo | 14 | |
| DNQ | 4 | (New Zealand) Mike Thackwell | Tyrrell-Ford | | | | |

== Championship standings after the race ==
Drivers' Championship standings

| Pos | Driver | Points |
|---|---|---|
| 1 | (France) Alain Prost | 43.5 |
| 2 | (Austria) Niki Lauda | 39 |
| 3 | (Italy) Elio de Angelis | 26.5 |
| 4 | (France) René Arnoux | 24.5 |
| 5 | (United Kingdom) Derek Warwick | 23 |

Constructors' Championship standings

| Pos | Constructor | Points |
|---|---|---|
| 1 | (United Kingdom) McLaren-TAG | 82.5 |
| 2 | (United Kingdom) Lotus-Renault | 35.5 |
| 3 | (Italy) Ferrari | 35.5 |
| 4 | (France) Renault | 32 |
| 5 | (United Kingdom) Williams-Honda | 24 |

- Note: Only the top five positions are included for both sets of standings. Points accurate at final declaration of results. Tyrrell's points were subsequently reallocated.

| Previous race: 1984 British Grand Prix | FIA Formula One World Championship; 1984 season | Next race: 1984 Austrian Grand Prix |
| Previous race: 1983 German Grand Prix | German Grand Prix | Next race: 1985 German Grand Prix |
