= List of Renault one-make racing cups champions =

This is a list of Renault one-make racing cups champions. Since year 2000 they are commonly named as Renault Clio Cups.

Colors-Cars

Renault 8 Gordini/Renault 8 TS	Renault 12 Gordini	Renault 5 LS/TL	Renault 5 TS/TX/Alpine/Alpine Turbo/LeCar	Renault 5 GT Turbo
Renault Alliance/Renault 21 Turbo	Renault Spider	Renault Mégane Coupé (I)	Renault Mégane R.S. (II)	Other
Renault Clio (I)	Renault Clio (II)	Renault Clio (III)	Renault Clio (IV)	Renault Clio (V)
Alpine V6 Turbo	Alpine A110

== Europe ==
=== Main ===
Year	FRA	ESP	GBR	ITA	SWI	GER	NLD	BEL
1966	(France) Robert Mieusset							
1967	(France) François Laccareau							
1968	(France) Roland Trollé							
1969	(France) Bernard Lagier	(Spain) Salvador Cañellas						
1970	(France) Bernard Mangé	(Spain) Gerardo Van Dulken						
1971	(France) Marc Sourd	(Spain) Juan G. de la Rasilla						
1972	(France) René Metge	(Spain) Juan Ignacio Villacieros						
1973	(France) Jean-Pierre Gabreau	(Spain) Juan Escavias de Carvajal						
1974	(France) Gérard Delplanque	(Spain) Jaime Villacieros	(United Kingdom) Neil McGrath					
1975	(France) Jean-Luc Rancon	(Spain) Ricardo García Galiano	(United Kingdom) Neil McGrath	(Italy) Aldo Cerruti				
1976	(France) Yves Frémont	(Spain) José A. Sasiambarrena	(United Kingdom) Neil McGrath	(Italy) Massimo Nardelli				
1977	(France) André Bourdon	(Spain) Arturo de Onís	(United Kingdom) ??	(Italy) Mauro Baldi				
1978	(France) Jean-Pierre Lajournade	(Spain) Fermín Sánchez	(United Kingdom) Neil McGrath	(Italy) Massimo Sigala	(Switzerland) Hans Peter Uellinger			
1979	(France) Éric Houdeletk	(Spain) César Hernández	(United Kingdom) Jim Edwards Sr	(Italy) Titto Salvatori	(Switzerland) Rolf Führer			
1980	(France) Denis Derepas	(Spain) Luis Pérez Sala	(United Kingdom) Rob Hall	(Italy) Luigi Giannini	(Switzerland) Silvio Berger			
1981	(France) Francis Canal	(Spain) Luis Villamil	Not held?	(San Marino) Massimo Ercolani	(Switzerland) Stephan Lüscher			
1982	(France) Manuel Carvalho	(Spain) Rafael Ochoa	Not held?	(Italy) Annino Conti	(Switzerland) Rene Traversa			
1983	(France) Jean-Michel Bernes	(Spain) Carlos Sainz	Not held?	(Italy) Ferruccio Zambaiti	(Switzerland) Armin Conrad			
1984	(France) Jean-Claude Dutrey	(Spain) Jesús Díez Villarroel	Not held?	(Italy) Marco Brand	(Switzerland) Herbert Furrer			
1985	(France) Marc Ranucci	(Spain) Javier Moreno	(United Kingdom) Rob Hall	(Italy) Marco Brand	(Switzerland) Hermman Roth			
1986	(France) Michel Duvernay	(Spain) Antonio Castro	(United Kingdom) ??	(Italy) Pibo	(Switzerland) Michel Walpen			
1987	(France) Michel Bourgault	(Spain) Manuel Ayuso	(United Kingdom) Barrie Wiliams	(Italy) Roberto Russo	(Switzerland) Urs Eberle			
1988	(France) Bernard Castagné	(Spain) Tomás Saldaña	(United Kingdom) ??	(Italy) Massimo Di Risio	(Switzerland) Charlie Grütter		(Belgium) Pierre-Alain Thibaut	
1989	(France) Jean-Louis Carponcin	(Spain) Enrique Codony	(United Kingdom) ??	(Italy) Salvatore Pirro	(Switzerland) Hanspeter Bigler		(Netherlands) John Postma	
1990	(France) Henri Lebeau	(Spain) Eduardo de Aysa	(United Kingdom) Jim Edwards Jr	(Italy) Mauro Gagliardini	(Switzerland) Philipp Steinauer		(Netherlands) Hendrik-Jan de Vries	
1991	(France) Patrick Bourdais	(Spain) Enrique de la Puente	(United Kingdom) Steve Waudby	(Italy) Salvatore Pirro	(Switzerland) Marcel Klay		(Netherlands) Frans Verschuur	(Belgium) ??
1992	(France) Jean-Marc Morizet	(Spain) Pablo Irizar	(United Kingdom) Matt Johnson	(Italy) Luca Drudi	(Switzerland) Stefan Bertschart		(Netherlands) Frans Verschuur	(Belgium) ??
1993	(France) Frédéric Fezard	(Spain) Ignacio Hervás	(United Kingdom) Alastair Lyall	(Italy) Maurizio Campani	(Switzerland) Daniel Hadorn		(Netherlands) Donald Molenaar	(Belgium) ??
1994	(France) Christophe Sarthy	(Spain) Iván Rodríguez	(United Kingdom) John Bintcliffe		(Switzerland) Edy Kobelt		(Netherlands) John de Vos	(Belgium) ??
1995	(France) Jean-François Poughon	(Spain) Nicolás Arribas	(United Kingdom) Lee Brookes		(Switzerland) Balz Kamm		(Netherlands) Frans Verschuur	(Belgium) Pierre-Yves Corthals
1996	(France) Éric Archambaud	(Spain) Leonardo Sabán	(United Kingdom) Jason Plato		(Switzerland) Jo Lima		(Netherlands) Phil Bastiaans	(Belgium) Pierre-Yves Corthals
1997	(France) Guillaume Greuet	(Spain) Victor Sáez	(United Kingdom) Bryce Wilson		(Switzerland) Daniel Hadorn		(Netherlands) Donald Molenaar	(Belgium) Pierre-Yves Corthals
1998	(France) Jean-Claude Kamber	(Spain) Javier Mora	(United Kingdom) Dan Eaves		(Switzerland) Edy Kamm		(Netherlands) Phil Bastiaans	(Belgium) ??
1999	(France) Frédéric Gabillon	(Spain) Alberto Hevia	(United Kingdom) Andy Priaulx		(Switzerland) Lorent Luyet		(Netherlands) John de Vos	(Belgium) Stéphane Lémeret
2000	(France) Gilles Vannelet	(Spain) Alfredo Mostajo	(United Kingdom) Jim Edwards Jr.		(Switzerland) Mathias Schläppi		(Netherlands) Marcel Kesseler	(Belgium) Pierre-Yves Corthals
2001		(Spain) Luis Miguel Reyes	(United Kingdom) Daniel Buxton		(Switzerland) Daniel Hadorn		(Netherlands) Jeroen Bleekemolen	(Belgium) Mathias Viaene
2002		(Spain) Iván Portoles	(United Kingdom) Paul Rivett		(Switzerland) Mathias Schläppi	(Germany) Sebastian Grunert	(Netherlands) Sebastiaan Bleekemolen	(Belgium) Stéphane Lémeret
2003		(Spain) Óscar Nogués	(Republic of Ireland) Jonathan Fildes	(Italy) Giuseppe Cirò	(Switzerland) Daniel Hadorn	(Germany) Marc Basseng	(Netherlands) Robert van der Berg	(Belgium) Michel Heydens
2004	(France) Ludovic Simon	(Spain) Álvaro Rodríguez	(United Kingdom) Paul Rivett	(Italy) Giuseppe Cirò	(Switzerland) Daniel Hadorn	(Germany) Demian Schaffert	(Netherlands) Sebastiaan Bleekemolen	(Belgium) Pierre-Yves Corthals
2005	(France) Nicolas Pierre	(Spain) Juan Miguel Larios	(United Kingdom) Jonathan Adam	(Italy) Massimiliano Pedalà	(Switzerland) Frédéric Yerly	(Germany) Christian Ott	(Netherlands) Allard Kalff	
2006	(France) Johan-Boris Scheier	(Spain) Luis Calleja	(United Kingdom) Tom Onslow-Cole	(Italy) Massimiliano Pedalà	(Switzerland) Lucas Ryf	(Netherlands) Wilko Becker	(Netherlands) Mike Verschuur	
2007	(France) Jean-Philippe Bournot	(Spain) Fernando Navarrete, jr	(United Kingdom) Martin Byford	(Italy) Massimiliano Pedalà	(Switzerland) Daniel Hadorn	(Germany) Kristian Nägele	(Netherlands) Tim Bujis	
2008	(Belgium) Maxime Martin	(Spain) Antonio de la Reina	(United Kingdom) Ben Winrow	(Italy) Simone Di Luca	(Switzerland) Daniel Hadorn		(Netherlands) Pim van Riet	(Belgium) François Verbist
2009	(France) Nicolas Milan	(Spain) Gonzalo M. de Andrés	(United Kingdom) Phil Glew	(Italy) Cristian Ricciarini	(Switzerland) Daniel Hadorn		(Netherlands) Sandra van der Sloot	(Belgium) François Verbist
2010	(France) Nicolas Milan	(Spain) José M. de los Milagros	(United Kingdom) Dave Newsham	(Italy) Giancarlo Lenzotti	(Switzerland) Frédéric Yerly		(Netherlands) Addie van de Ven	
2011	(France) Nicolas Milan	(Spain) José M. de los Milagros	(United Kingdom) Paul Rivett	(Spain) Óscar Nogués	(Switzerland) Reto Wüst		(Netherlands) Sebastiaan Bleekemolen	
2012	(France) Marc Guillot	(France) Marc Guillot	(United Kingdom) Jack Goff	(Switzerland) Stefano Comini	(Germany) Marc-Uwe von Niesewand		(Netherlands) Niels Langeveld	
2013	(France) Éric Trémoulet	(France) Nicolas Milan	(United Kingdom) Josh Files	(Italy) Ronnie Marchetti	(Germany) Dino Calcum		(Netherlands) Marcel Dekker	
2014	(France) Nicolas Milan	(France) Marc Guillot	(United Kingdom) Mike Bushell	(Spain) Óscar Nogués	(Germany) Dino Calcum		(Netherlands) Sebastiaan Bleekemolen	
2015	(France) Marc Guillot	(Spain) Rafa Villanueva	(United Kingdom) Ashley Sutton	(Italy) Simone Iacone	(Switzerland) Pascal Eberle		(Netherlands) Niels Langeveld	
2016	(France) Éric Trémoulet	(France) Éric Trémoulet	(United Kingdom) Ant Whorton-Eales	(Italy) Cristian Ricciarini	(Germany) Dino Calcum		(Netherlands) Sebastiaan Bleekemolen	
2017	(France) Marc Guillot	(Spain) Álex Royo	(United Kingdom) Mike Bushell	(Italy) Gustavo Sandrucci	(Czech Republic) Tomáš Pekař		(Belgium) Sven van Laere	
2018	(France) Nicolas Milan	(France) Nicolas Milan	(United Kingdom) Paul Rivett	(Italy) Simone Di Luca	(Netherlands) Sebastiaan Bleekemolen			
2019	(France) Dorian Guldenfels	(France) David Pouget	(United Kingdom) Jack Young	(Italy) Felice Jelmini	(Czech Republic) Tomáš Pekař			
2020	(France) Nicolas Milan	(France) Nicolas Milan		(Italy) Massimiliano Danetti	(Czech Republic) Tomáš Pekař			
Year	FRA	ESP	GBR	ITA	(Switzerland) (Germany) (Czech Republic) Bohemia		(Netherlands) (Belgium) Benelux	
Year	FRA	ESP	GBR	ITA	(Switzerland) (Germany) (Czech Republic) (Netherlands) (Belgium) Central Europe			

(Europe) Clio Cup Series

Year	(France)	(Spain)	(Italy)	Eastern Europe	(Europe)
2021	Clio Cup Europe (Overall): (France) Nicolas Milan				
2021	(France) Nicolas Milan	(France) Nicolas Milan	(France) Marc Guillot	(France) Marc Guillot	
2022	Clio Cup Series (Super-winner): (France) Nicolas Milan				
2022	(France) Nicolas Milan	(Spain) Álex Royo	(Italy) Gabriele Torelli	(France) Marc Guillot	(France) Anthony Jurado
2023	Clio Cup Series (Overall): (France) David Pouget				
2023	(France) David Pouget	(Spain) Adrián Schimpf	(Italy) Luca Franca	(Italy) Gabriele Torelli	(France) David Pouget
2024	Clio Cup Series (Overall): (Italy) Gabriele Torelli				
2024	(Italy) Gabriele Torelli	(Italy) Damiano Puccetti	(France) Anthony Jurado	(Netherlands) Lorenzo van Riet	
2025	Clio Cup Series (Overall): (France) David Pouget				
2025	(France) David Pouget	(Italy) Gabriele Torelli	(France) Gaël Castelli	(France) Alexandre Finkelstein	

=== Other ===
Year	(Spain) (Iniciación)	PRT	(Denmark) (Sweden) (Norway) Scandinavia		SLO	(Europe) (Cups)	(Europe) (Trophies)
1974	(Spain) Rafael de Juan						
1975	(Spain) Arturo de Onís						
1976	(Spain) Pedro Galera					(France) Yves Frémont	
1977	(Spain) Francisco Larrey					(Italy) Mauro Baldi	
1978	(Spain) Luis Villamil					(Germany) Wolfgang Schütz	
1979	(Spain) Alberto González						
1980	(Spain) José Luis Llobell						
1981	(Spain) Rafael Ochoa					(Germany) Wolfgang Schütz	
1982	(Spain) Carlos Sainz					(France) Joël Gouhier	
1983	(Spain) Alfonso Casado					(Netherlands) Jan Lammers	
1984	(Spain) Gustavo Durán					(Netherlands) Jan Lammers	
1985	(Spain) Iñigo Maguregui					(Argentina) Oscar Larrauri	
1986	(Portugal) Henrique Marqués					(Italy) Massimo Sigala	
1987	(Spain) Luis Rodríguez-Astudillo					(Italy) Massimo Sigala	
1988	(Spain) David Arias	(Portugal) ??				(Italy) Massimo Sigala	
1989	(Spain) Enrique de la Puente	(Portugal) ??				(Italy) Massimo Sigala	
1990	(Spain) Bertrand Tramont	(Portugal) ??				(Italy) Massimo Sigala	
1991	(Spain) Juan Carlos Delgado	(Portugal) Albuquerque de Carvalho					
1992	(Spain) Iván Rodríguez	(Portugal) Vítor Lopes	(Sweden) Kenny Bräck			(France) Bernard Castagne	
1993	(Spain) Alfredo Mesalles	(Portugal) José João Magalhães	(Sweden) Jan Nilsson			(Italy) Salvatore Pirro	
1994	(Spain) Diego Aznar	(Portugal) Vasco Campos	(Norway) Thomas Nielsen			(France) Bernard Castagne	
1995	(Spain) Guillermo Paniagua	(Portugal) Vasco Campos	(Norway) Sten Erik Nielsen			(Switzerland) Marcel Kläy	
1996	(Spain) Rafa Villanueva	(Portugal) Vasco Campos					(Italy) Franck Lagorce
1997		(Portugal) Luís Veloso					(Norway) Tommy Rustad
1998		(Portugal) José João Magalhães					(Italy) Andrea Belicchi
1999		(Portugal) Francisco Carvalho					(France) Jérôme Policand
2000		(Portugal) Patrick Cunha					(Italy) Luca Rangoni
2001		(Portugal) Luís Veloso					(Italy) Luca Rangoni
2002		(Portugal) Patrick Cunha					(Italy) Luca Rangoni
2003							(Italy) Luca Rangoni
2004			(Denmark) Jesper Davidsen				
2005			(Denmark) Henrik Larsen				(Belgium) Jan Heylen
2006			(Denmark) Jesper Davidsen				(Netherlands) Jaap van Lagen
2007			(Norway) Petter Granlund		??		(Portugal) Pedro Petiz
2008			(Denmark) Per Poulsen		(Croatia) Dan Lipošćak		(France) Michaël Rossi
2009			(Denmark) Claus Christensen		(Italy) Giancarlo Lenzotti		(Netherlands) Mike Verschuur
2010			(Denmark) Michael Christensen				(Netherlands) Nick Catsburg
2011			(Denmark) Michael Christensen			(France) Nicolas Milan	(Switzerland) Stefano Comini
2012			(Denmark) Kim Lund Johansen	(Sweden) Andreas Wernersson		(Spain) Óscar Nogués	(Spain) Albert Costa
2013				(Sweden) Andreas Wernersson		(United Kingdom) Josh Files	(Italy) Mirko Bortolotti
2014				(Sweden) Robert Helling		(Spain) Óscar Nogués	
2015				(Sweden) Henric Skoog			(France) Andrea Pizzitola
2016				(Sweden) Marcus Annervi			(Netherlands) Pieter Schothorst
2017				(Sweden) Joel Jern			
2018						(France) Pierre Sancinéna	
2019						(France) Gaël Castelli	
2020						(France) Jean-Baptiste Mela	
2021						(France) Jean-Baptiste Mela	
2022						(France) Lucas Frayssinet	
2023						(Belgium) Lorens Lecertua	
2024	(Spain) Nico Abella					(France) Charles Roussanne	
Year	(Spain) (VLine)	PRT	DNK	SWE	(Slovenia) (Croatia) (Austria) (Italy) Alpe Adria	(Europe) (Cups)	(Europe) (Trophies)

== America ==
Year	(United States) IMSA Renault Cup	Year	(Argentina) Copa Mégane	(Brazil) Super Clio Cup	(Mexico) Renault Clio Cup
1982	(United States) ??	2000	(Argentina) Rubén Valsagna		
1983	(United States) ??	2001	(Argentina) Juan Pablo Satorra		
(United States) IMSA Renault Alliance Cup		2002	(Argentina) Nicolás Kern	(Brazil) Luiz Carreira Jr.	(Mexico) Eugenio Martín del Campo
1984	??	2003	(Argentina) Pablo Varela	(Brazil) Elias Nascimento Jr.	(Mexico) Ricardo Pérez de Lara
1985	(United States) Parker Johnstone	2004	(Argentina) Humberto Krujoski	(Brazil) René Bauer	(Mexico) José González
(United States) SCCA Sports Renault		2005	(Argentina) Gabriel Satorra	(Brazil) José Cordova	
1985	(United States) David Murry	2006	(Argentina) Jorge Loyarte	(Brazil) Wagner Ebrahim	
1986	(United States) Scott Lagasse	2007	(Argentina) Agustín Canapino	(Brazil) José Cordova	
1987	(United States) Mike Davies	2008	(Argentina) Facundo Della Motta	(Brazil) José Cordova	
1988	(United States) Mike Davies	2009	(Argentina) Nicolás Ursprung	(Brazil) José C. Vitte	

== Asia ==
TUR		CHN		(United Arab Emirates) Middle East	
2002	(Turkey) Hakan Güven	2009	(Hong Kong) Aaron Kwok	2022-23	(Poland) Jerzy Spinkiewicz
2003	(Turkey) Ahmet Atay	2010	(Hong Kong) David Louie	2023-24	(Mexico) Eduardo Miranda
2004	(Turkey) Selim Özgörkey	2011	(United Kingdom) Steve Elmes	2024-25	(United Kingdom) Harry Hannam
		2012	(Hong Kong) Eric Lo		
		2013	(Hong Kong) Tommy Chan		
		2014	(South Africa) Naomi Schiff		
		2015	(Indonesia) Senna Iriawan		
		2016	(China) Kenneth Lim		
		2017	(Hong Kong) David Lau		
		2018	(Hong Kong) Frank Yee		
		2019	(China) Yang Chun Lei		

== See also ==
- Renault Clio Cup § Chronology and cars used
- Dacia Logan Cup
- Formula Renault
- Eurocup Mégane Trophy
- es:Copa Nacional Renault
- es:Copa Mégane Argentina
- fr:Clio Cup France
- fr:Coupe de France Renault
- nl:Renault Clio Cup
- de:New Renault Clio Cup
