= 1998 12 Hours of Sebring =

Sports car endurance race

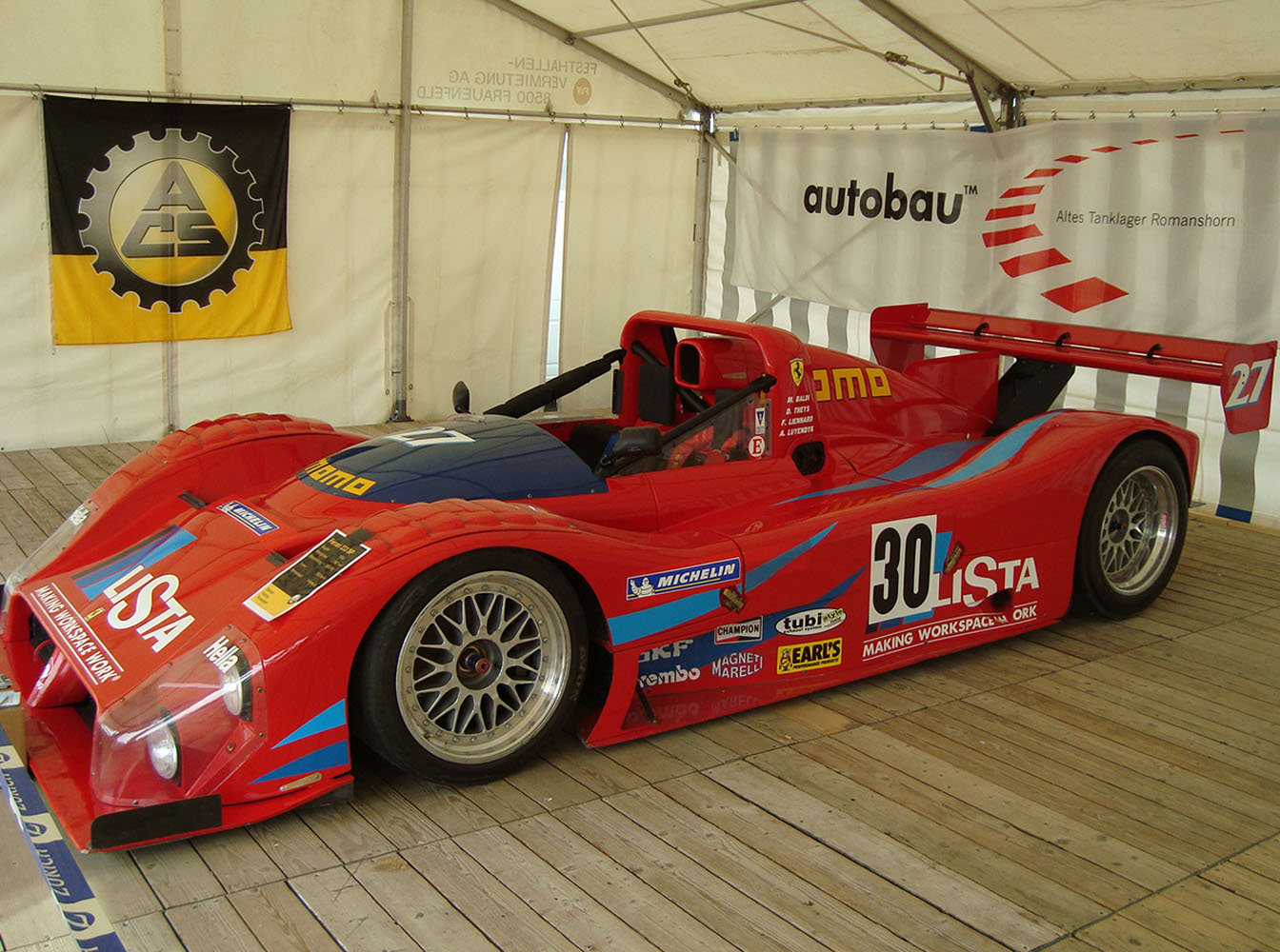
Ferrari 333 SP

The 1998 Superflo 12 Hours of Sebring was the 46th running of the 12 Hours of Sebring. It also served as the inaugural round of the 1998 IMSA GT Championship season. It took place at Sebring International Raceway, Florida, on March 22, 1998.

== Race results ==
Class winners in bold.

Pos	Class	No	Team	Drivers	Chassis	Tyre	Laps
Pos	Class	No	Team	Drivers	Engine	Tyre	Laps
1	**WSC**	**30**	**(United States) MOMO Doran Racing**	**(Belgium) Didier Theys (Italy) Mauro Baldi (Italy) Gianpiero Moretti**	**Ferrari 333 SP**	**Y**	**319**
1	**WSC**	**30**	**(United States) MOMO Doran Racing**	**(Belgium) Didier Theys (Italy) Mauro Baldi (Italy) Gianpiero Moretti**	**Ferrari F310E 4.0 L V12**	**Y**	**319**
2	**GT1**	**4**	**(United States) Panoz Motorsports**	**(United Kingdom) Andy Wallace (Australia) David Brabham**	**Panoz GTR-1**	**MI**	**318**
2	**GT1**	**4**	**(United States) Panoz Motorsports**	**(United Kingdom) Andy Wallace (Australia) David Brabham**	**Ford (Roush) 6.0 L V8**	**MI**	**318**
3	GT1	74	(United States) Champion Motors	(Belgium) Thierry Boutsen (France) Bob Wollek (United Kingdom) Andy Pilgrim	Porsche 911 GT1	**MI**	318
3	GT1	74	(United States) Champion Motors	(Belgium) Thierry Boutsen (France) Bob Wollek (United Kingdom) Andy Pilgrim	Porsche 3.2 L Turbo Flat-6	**MI**	318
4	GT1	5	(United States) Panoz Motorsports	(France) Éric Bernard (United Kingdom) Jamie Davies (United States) Doc Bundy	Panoz GTR-1	**MI**	312
4	GT1	5	(United States) Panoz Motorsports	(France) Éric Bernard (United Kingdom) Jamie Davies (United States) Doc Bundy	Ford (Roush) 6.0 L V8	**MI**	312
5	**GT2**	**66**	**(Germany) Konrad Racing**	**(United States) Nick Ham (Austria) Franz Konrad**	**Porsche 911 GT2**	**MI**	**300**
5	**GT2**	**66**	**(Germany) Konrad Racing**	**(United States) Nick Ham (Austria) Franz Konrad**	**Porsche 3.6 L Turbo Flat-6**	**MI**	**300**
6 DNF	WSC	7	(United States) Doyle-Risi Racing	(South Africa) Wayne Taylor (Belgium) Eric van de Poele (Spain) Fermín Vélez	Ferrari 333 SP	**P**	298
6 DNF	WSC	7	(United States) Doyle-Risi Racing	(South Africa) Wayne Taylor (Belgium) Eric van de Poele (Spain) Fermín Vélez	Ferrari F310E 4.0 L V12	**P**	298
7	GT2	65	(United States) Saleen Allen Speedlab	(United States) Steve Saleen (United States) Ron Johnson (United States) Tommy Archer	Saleen Mustang SR	?	297
7	GT2	65	(United States) Saleen Allen Speedlab	(United States) Steve Saleen (United States) Ron Johnson (United States) Tommy Archer	Ford 5.9 L V8	?	297
8	GT1	91	(United States) Rock Valley Racing	(United States) John Heinricy (United States) Stu Hayner (United States) Roger Schramm	Chevrolet Camaro	**G**	297
8	GT1	91	(United States) Rock Valley Racing	(United States) John Heinricy (United States) Stu Hayner (United States) Roger Schramm	Chevrolet V8	**G**	297
9	GT2	04	(Canada) C.J. Motorsports	(United States) John Morton (Canada) John Graham (Canada) Ron Fellows	Porsche 911 GT2	**G**	296
9	GT2	04	(Canada) C.J. Motorsports	(United States) John Morton (Canada) John Graham (Canada) Ron Fellows	Porsche 3.6 L Turbo Flat-6	**G**	296
10	GT2	99	(United States) Larry Schumacher	(United Kingdom) Robert Nearn (United States) John O'Steen (United States) Larry Schumacher	Porsche 911 GT2	**P**	296
10	GT2	99	(United States) Larry Schumacher	(United Kingdom) Robert Nearn (United States) John O'Steen (United States) Larry Schumacher	Porsche 3.6 L Turbo Flat-6	**P**	296
11	**GT3**	**10**	**(United States) Prototype Technology Group**	**(United States) Bill Auberlen (United States) Boris Said**	**BMW M3**	**Y**	**295**
11	**GT3**	**10**	**(United States) Prototype Technology Group**	**(United States) Bill Auberlen (United States) Boris Said**	**BMW 3.2 L I6**	**Y**	**295**
12	GT3	6	(United States) Prototype Technology Group	(United States) Peter Cunningham (Canada) Ross Bentley (United States) Mark Simo	BMW M3	**Y**	293
12	GT3	6	(United States) Prototype Technology Group	(United States) Peter Cunningham (Canada) Ross Bentley (United States) Mark Simo	BMW 3.2 L I6	**Y**	293
13	WSC	20	(United States) Dyson Racing	(United States) Dorsey Schroeder (United States) Butch Leitzinger (United Kingdom) James Weaver (United States) Elliott Forbes-Robinson	Riley & Scott Mk III	**G**	290
13	WSC	20	(United States) Dyson Racing	(United States) Dorsey Schroeder (United States) Butch Leitzinger (United Kingdom) James Weaver (United States) Elliott Forbes-Robinson	Ford 5.0 L V8	**G**	290
14	GT3	23	(United States) Alex Job Racing	(United States) Charles Slater (United States) Cort Wagner (United States) Darryl Havens	Porsche 911 Carrera RSR	**P**	286
14	GT3	23	(United States) Alex Job Racing	(United States) Charles Slater (United States) Cort Wagner (United States) Darryl Havens	Porsche 3.8 L Flat-6	**P**	286
15	GT3	07	(United States) G & W Motorsports	(Netherlands) Patrick Huisman (United States) Danny Marshall (United States) Steve Marshall (United States) Darren Law	Porsche 993	**P**	285
15	GT3	07	(United States) G & W Motorsports	(Netherlands) Patrick Huisman (United States) Danny Marshall (United States) Steve Marshall (United States) Darren Law	Porsche 3.8 L Flat-6	**P**	285
16	GT3	76	(United States) Team A.R.E.	(United States) John Ruther (United States) Jake Vargo (United States) Nick Anegelos (United States) Peter Argetsinger	Porsche 993 Carrera RSR	**Y**	283
16	GT3	76	(United States) Team A.R.E.	(United States) John Ruther (United States) Jake Vargo (United States) Nick Anegelos (United States) Peter Argetsinger	Porsche 3.8 L Flat-6	**Y**	283
17	WSC	95	(United States) TRV Motorsport	(United States) Jeret Schroeder (United States) Tom Volk (United States) Lyn St. James	Kudzu DL-4	**G**	283
17	WSC	95	(United States) TRV Motorsport	(United States) Jeret Schroeder (United States) Tom Volk (United States) Lyn St. James	Chevrolet 6.0 L V8	**G**	283
18	GT3	24	(United States) Tim Vargo	(United States) Jack Refenning (United States) Tim Vargo (United States) Josh Vargo (United States) Brady Refenning	Porsche 911 Carrera RSR	**P**	277
18	GT3	24	(United States) Tim Vargo	(United States) Jack Refenning (United States) Tim Vargo (United States) Josh Vargo (United States) Brady Refenning	Porsche 3.8 L Flat-6	**P**	277
19	GT3	25	(United States) Alex Job Racing	(United States) Charles Slater (United States) Don Kitch (Italy) Angelo Cilli (United States) Dale White (United States) Michael Peterson	Porsche 911 Carrera RSR	**P**	268
19	GT3	25	(United States) Alex Job Racing	(United States) Charles Slater (United States) Don Kitch (Italy) Angelo Cilli (United States) Dale White (United States) Michael Peterson	Porsche 3.8 L Flat-6	**P**	268
20	GT1	2	(United States) Mosler Automotive	(United States) Shane Lewis (United States) Vic Rice (United States) Tom Reese	Mosler Raptor	**P**	263
20	GT1	2	(United States) Mosler Automotive	(United States) Shane Lewis (United States) Vic Rice (United States) Tom Reese	Chevrolet 6.3 L V8	**P**	263
21	GT3	96	(United States) Olive Garden Racing	(United States) Kevin Wheeler (United States) Mike Davies (United States) Ron Zitza	Porsche 911 Carrera RSR	**P**	259
21	GT3	96	(United States) Olive Garden Racing	(United States) Kevin Wheeler (United States) Mike Davies (United States) Ron Zitza	Porsche 3.8 L Flat-6	**P**	259
22	GT1	71	(United States) Art Pilla	(United States) Arthur Pilla (United States) Oma Kimbrough (United States) David Kitchak	Porsche 911 GT2	?	253
22	GT1	71	(United States) Art Pilla	(United States) Arthur Pilla (United States) Oma Kimbrough (United States) David Kitchak	Porsche 3.6 L Turbo Flat-6	?	253
23 DNF	GT3	46	(United States) Bill Radar	(United States) Max Schmidt (United States) Chris Bingham	Porsche 911 Carrera RSR	**P**	249
23 DNF	GT3	46	(United States) Bill Radar	(United States) Max Schmidt (United States) Chris Bingham	Porsche 3.8 L Flat-6	**P**	249
24 DNF	WSC	39	(United States) Matthews-Colucci Racing	(United States) David Murry (United States) Hurley Haywood (United Kingdom) Derek Bell (United States) Jim Matthews	Riley & Scott Mk III	**P**	247
24 DNF	WSC	39	(United States) Matthews-Colucci Racing	(United States) David Murry (United States) Hurley Haywood (United Kingdom) Derek Bell (United States) Jim Matthews	Ford 5.0 L V8	**P**	247
25	GT3	32	(United States) Phoenix Motorsports	(United States) Don Knowles (United States) Jim Michaelian (United States) Jim McNeely (United States) John Heinricy	Pontiac Firebird	**T**	246
25	GT3	32	(United States) Phoenix Motorsports	(United States) Don Knowles (United States) Jim Michaelian (United States) Jim McNeely (United States) John Heinricy	Pontiac V8	**T**	246
26	WSC	12	(United States) Genesis Racing	(United States) Chuck Goldsborough (United Kingdom) Michael DeFontes (United States) Mark Neuhaus (United States) Rick Fairbanks	Hawk MD3R	**G**	244
26	WSC	12	(United States) Genesis Racing	(United States) Chuck Goldsborough (United Kingdom) Michael DeFontes (United States) Mark Neuhaus (United States) Rick Fairbanks	Mazda 2.0 L 3-Rotor	**G**	244
27 DNF	GT3	68	(United States) The Racer's Group	(United States) Stephen Earle (United States) Philip Collin (United States) Kevin Buckler	Porsche 911 Carrera RSR	?	242
27 DNF	GT3	68	(United States) The Racer's Group	(United States) Stephen Earle (United States) Philip Collin (United States) Kevin Buckler	Porsche 3.8 L Flat-6	?	242
28 DNF	GT1	11	(United States) Robinson Racing	(United States) Jack Baldwin (United States) Irv Hoerr (United States) George Robinson	Oldsmobile Aurora GTS-1	?	235
28 DNF	GT1	11	(United States) Robinson Racing	(United States) Jack Baldwin (United States) Irv Hoerr (United States) George Robinson	Oldsmobile 4.0 L V8	?	235
29 DNF	GT3	55	(United States) AASCO Performance	(United States) Tim Ralston (United States) Kelly Collins (Costa Rica) Jorge Trejos	Porsche 911 Carrera RSR	**P**	232
29 DNF	GT3	55	(United States) AASCO Performance	(United States) Tim Ralston (United States) Kelly Collins (Costa Rica) Jorge Trejos	Porsche 3.8 L Flat-6	**P**	232
30 DNF	WSC	28	(United States) Intersport Racing	(United States) Jon Field (United States) Butch Brickell (United States) Rick Sutherland	Riley & Scott Mk III	**G**	173
30 DNF	WSC	28	(United States) Intersport Racing	(United States) Jon Field (United States) Butch Brickell (United States) Rick Sutherland	Ford 5.0 L V8	**G**	173
31 DNF	GT2	77	(Germany) Konrad Motorsport	(Germany) Wido Rössler (United States) Peter Kitchak (United States) Matt Turner	Porsche 911 GT2	**D**	170
31 DNF	GT2	77	(Germany) Konrad Motorsport	(Germany) Wido Rössler (United States) Peter Kitchak (United States) Matt Turner	Porsche 3.6 L Turbo Flat-6	**D**	170
32 DNF	GT3	1	(United States) Prototype Technology Group	(United States) Craig Carter (United States) Andy Petery (Italy) Giovanna Amati	BMW M3	**Y**	170
32 DNF	GT3	1	(United States) Prototype Technology Group	(United States) Craig Carter (United States) Andy Petery (Italy) Giovanna Amati	BMW 3.2 L I6	**Y**	170
33 DNF	GT2	01	(United States) Rohr	(Canada) Sylvain Tremblay (United States) Martin Snow (United States) Jochen Rohr	Porsche 911 GT2	**P**	160
33 DNF	GT2	01	(United States) Rohr	(Canada) Sylvain Tremblay (United States) Martin Snow (United States) Jochen Rohr	Porsche 3.6 L Turbo Flat-6	**P**	160
34 DNF	GT2	38	(United States) Mark Hein	(United States) Mark Hein (United States) Gary Blackman (United States) John Green (United States) Pete Halsmer	Acura NSX	**G**	159
34 DNF	GT2	38	(United States) Mark Hein	(United States) Mark Hein (United States) Gary Blackman (United States) John Green (United States) Pete Halsmer	Acura 3.2 L V6	**G**	159
35 DNF	GT1	87	(United States) John Annis	(United States) John Annis (United States) Lee Hill (United States) Randy Pobst (United States) Mick Robinson	Chevrolet Camaro	?	152
35 DNF	GT1	87	(United States) John Annis	(United States) John Annis (United States) Lee Hill (United States) Randy Pobst (United States) Mick Robinson	Chevrolet V8	?	152
36 DNF	WSC	8	(United States) Transatlantic Racing Services	(United States) Johnny O'Connell (United States) Henry Camferdam (United States) Scott Schubot	Riley & Scott Mk III	**D**	130
36 DNF	WSC	8	(United States) Transatlantic Racing Services	(United States) Johnny O'Connell (United States) Henry Camferdam (United States) Scott Schubot	Ford 5.0 L V8	**D**	130
37 DNF	WSC	59	(United States) Intersport Racing	(United States) Alex Smith (United States) Simon Gregg (United States) Joaquin DeSoto (United States) John Mirro	Spice SC95	**G**	129
37 DNF	WSC	59	(United States) Intersport Racing	(United States) Alex Smith (United States) Simon Gregg (United States) Joaquin DeSoto (United States) John Mirro	Oldsmobile Aurora 4.0 L V8	**G**	129
38 DNF	GT3	54	(United States) Bell Motorsports	(United States) Terry Borcheller (United States) Carlos DeQuesada (United States) Scott Neuman (United States) Joe Varde	BMW M3	**Y**	125
38 DNF	GT3	54	(United States) Bell Motorsports	(United States) Terry Borcheller (United States) Carlos DeQuesada (United States) Scott Neuman (United States) Joe Varde	BMW 3.2 L I6	**Y**	125
39 DNF	GT3	93	Team Ecuador	(Ecuador) Henry Taleb (Italy) Rino Mastronardi	Nissan 240SX	**Y**	95
39 DNF	GT3	93	Team Ecuador	(Ecuador) Henry Taleb (Italy) Rino Mastronardi	Nissan 2.4 L I4	**Y**	95
40 DNF	GT3	57	(United States) Kryderacing	(United States) Luis Sereix (United States) Frank Del Vecchio (United States) Reed Kryder	Nissan 240SX	?	42
40 DNF	GT3	57	(United States) Kryderacing	(United States) Luis Sereix (United States) Frank Del Vecchio (United States) Reed Kryder	Nissan 2.4 L I4	?	42
41 DNF	WSC	63	(United States) Downing Atlanta	(United States) Jim Pace (Japan) Yojiro Terada (United States) Jim Downing	Kudzu DLM	**G**	36
41 DNF	WSC	63	(United States) Downing Atlanta	(United States) Jim Pace (Japan) Yojiro Terada (United States) Jim Downing	Mazda 2.0 L 3-Rotor	**G**	36
42 DNF	GT3	86	(United States) First Union	(United States) Darren Law (United States) Steve Pfeffer (United States) Mike Fitzgerald	Porsche 993	?	34
42 DNF	GT3	86	(United States) First Union	(United States) Darren Law (United States) Steve Pfeffer (United States) Mike Fitzgerald	Porsche 3.8 L Flat-6	?	34
43 DNF	GT3	67	(United States) The Racer's Group	(United States) Peter Baron (United States) Dennis O'Keefe (United States) Steve Pelke	Porsche 911 Carrera RSR	?	24
43 DNF	GT3	67	(United States) The Racer's Group	(United States) Peter Baron (United States) Dennis O'Keefe (United States) Steve Pelke	Porsche 3.8L Flat-6	?	24
44 DNF	GT2	15	(United States) Jon Lewis	(United States) Bill Eagle (United States) Dorsey Schroeder	Vector M12	**G**	16
44 DNF	GT2	15	(United States) Jon Lewis	(United States) Bill Eagle (United States) Dorsey Schroeder	Lamborghini 5.7 L V12	**G**	16
45 DNF	WSC	16	(United States) Dyson Racing	(United Kingdom) James Weaver (United States) Elliott Forbes-Robinson (United States) Butch Leitzinger	Riley & Scott Mk III	**G**	7
45 DNF	WSC	16	(United States) Dyson Racing	(United Kingdom) James Weaver (United States) Elliott Forbes-Robinson (United States) Butch Leitzinger	Ford 5.0L V8	**G**	7
46 DNF	GT2	69	(Germany) Gustl Spreng	(Germany) Gustl Spreng (Germany) Kersten Jodexnis (United States) Ray Mummery	Porsche 993 Carrera Turbo	**Y**	6
46 DNF	GT2	69	(Germany) Gustl Spreng	(Germany) Gustl Spreng (Germany) Kersten Jodexnis (United States) Ray Mummery	Porsche 3.6 L Turbo Flat-6	**Y**	6
47 DNF	GT3	33	(United States) Phoenix Racing	(United States) Steve McNeely (United States) Jim Michealian (United States) Joe Aquilante	Pontiac Firebird	?	4
47 DNF	GT3	33	(United States) Phoenix Racing	(United States) Steve McNeely (United States) Jim Michealian (United States) Joe Aquilante	Pontiac V8	?	4
48 DNF	GT1	3	(United States) Greg Malvaso	(United States) Jerry Kinn (United States) Chuck Singletary (United States) Gerre Payvis	Chevrolet Camaro	?	0
48 DNF	GT1	3	(United States) Greg Malvaso	(United States) Jerry Kinn (United States) Chuck Singletary (United States) Gerre Payvis	Chevrolet V8	?	0

== Statistics ==
- Pole Position - #7 Doyle-Risi Racing - 1:55.052
- Average Speed - 158.208 km/h (98.306 mph)
