= Mauro Baldi =

Italian racing driver (born 1954)

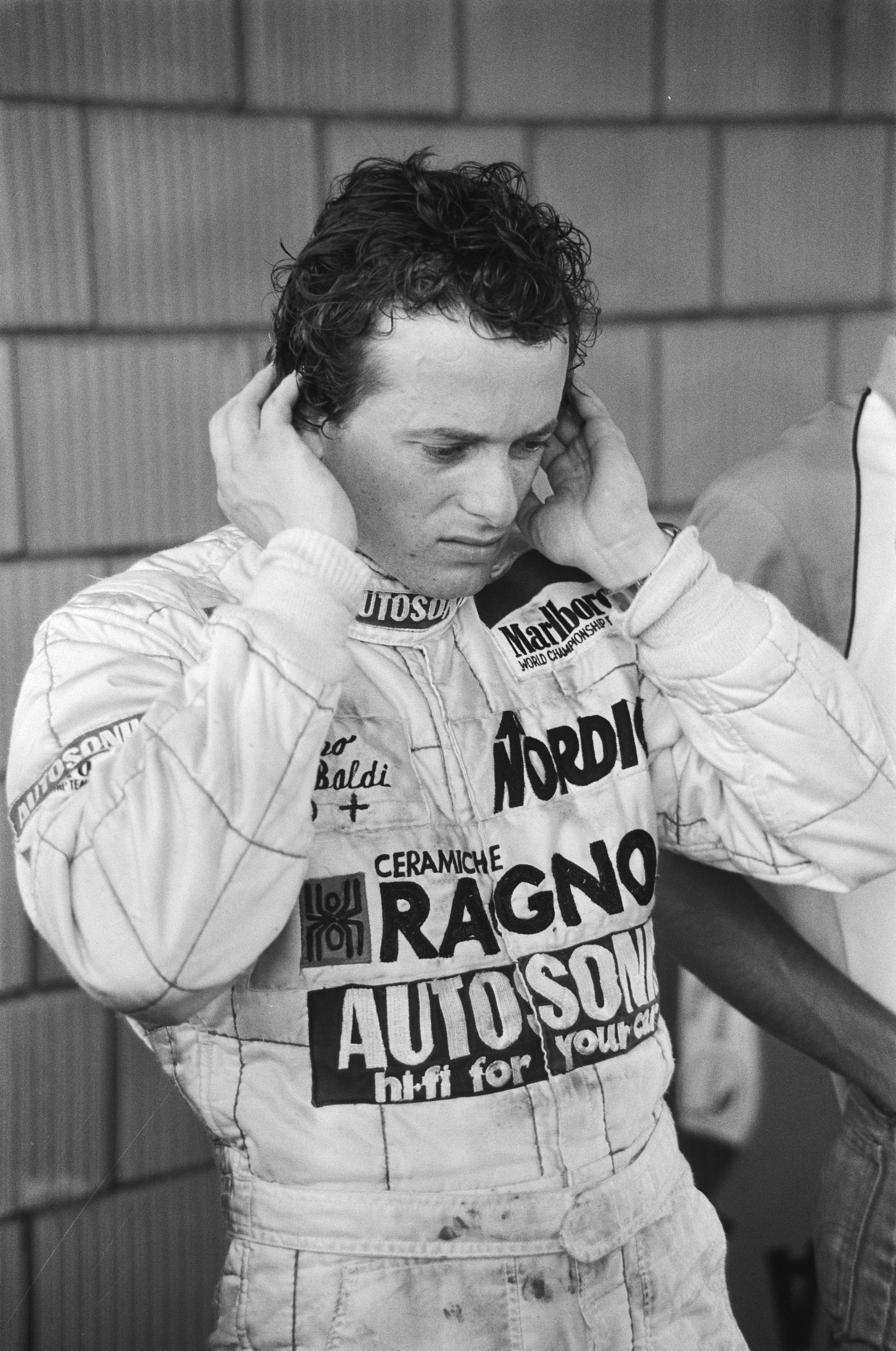
- Baldi at the 1982 Dutch Grand Prix
- Born: Mauro Giuseppe Baldi; 31 January 1954 (age 72); Reggio Emilia, Emilia-Romagna, Italy

Formula One World Championship career
- Nationality: (Italy) Italian
- Active years: 1982–1985
- Team(s): Arrows, Alfa Romeo, Spirit
- Entries: 41 (36 starts)
- Championships: 0
- Wins: 0
- Podiums: 0
- Career points: 5
- Pole positions: 0
- Fastest laps: 0
- First entry: 1982 South African Grand Prix
- Last entry: 1985 San Marino Grand Prix

World Sportscar Championship career
- Years active: 1982, 1984–1992
- Teams: Momo, Martini, Jolly Club, RLR, Sauber, Peugeot
- Starts: 69
- Championships: 1 (1990)
- Wins: 17
- Podiums: 34
- Poles: 20
- Fastest laps: 10

24 Hours of Le Mans career
- Years: 1984–1986, 1988–1989, 1991–1994, 1997–2000
- Teams: Martini, Porsche, Sauber, Peugeot, Konrad, Moretti, JB, Panoz
- Best finish: 1st (1994)
- Class wins: 1 (1994)

Mauro Giuseppe Baldi (born 31 January 1954) is an Italian former racing driver, who competed in Formula One from 1982 to 1985. In endurance racing, Baldi won the World Sportscar Championship in 1990 with Sauber, and the 24 Hours of Le Mans in 1994 with Porsche; he won the 12 Hours of Sebring in 1998 and is a two-time winner of the 24 Hours of Daytona with Doran.

Baldi is one of 11 drivers to complete the informal Triple Crown of endurance racing, achieving the feat at the 1998 12 Hours of Sebring.

== Biography ==
Mauro Giuseppe Baldi was born on 31 January 1954 in Reggio Emilia, Emilia-Romagna.

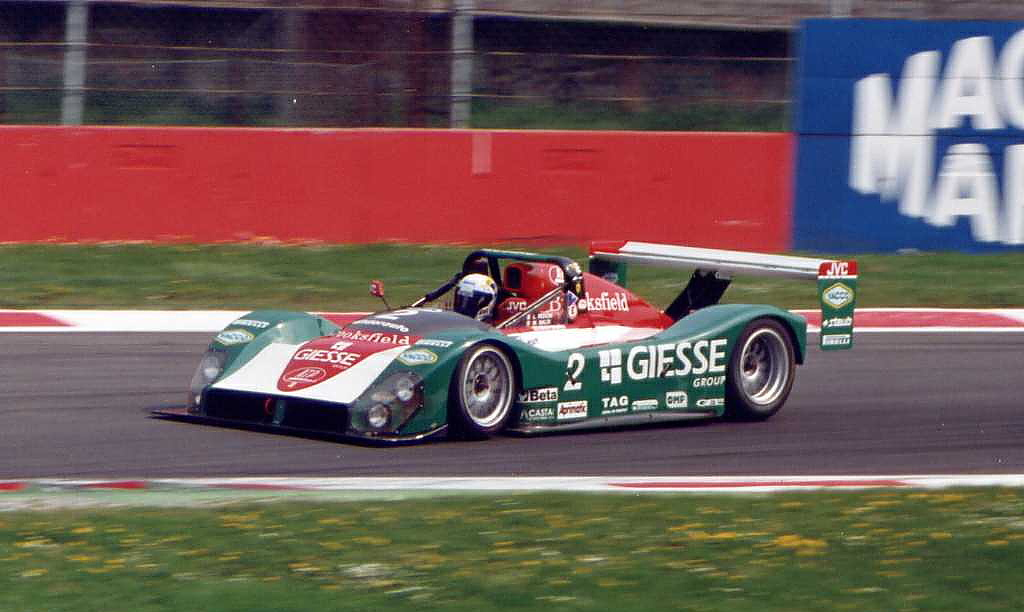
Baldi driving at Monza during the 1999 SportsRacing World Cup.

Baldi started his career in rallying in 1972 and turned to circuit racing in 1975 with the Italian Renault 5 Cup. By 1980, he had become a top Formula 3 driver, winning the Monaco F3 Grand Prix and the 1981 European Formula 3 Championship with eight victories. In 1982, he signed to drive for Arrows before moving to Alfa Romeo in 1983, scoring a fifth place in Zandvoort. When Benetton became Alfa Romeo's team sponsor in 1984, Baldi lost his drive, and joined the underfunded Spirit team until 1985.

After retiring from Formula One, Baldi went to enjoy a successful career in sports car racing, driving for the works Martini-Lancia team in 1984 and 1985. In 1986, he switched to a Porsche 956 from Richard Lloyd Racing's outfit, returning to a works drive in 1988 with the Sauber-Mercedes team, with whom Baldi won the 1990 FIA World Sports Prototype Championship for Drivers, sharing the car with Jean-Louis Schlesser. In 1991 and 1992, he was a driver for Peugeot.

Baldi came very close to making a return to F1 in 1989, when he agreed with Coloni to take over one of the team's cars from Enrico Bertaggia for the Italian Grand Prix. The move was blocked by Jochen Neerpasch, the sporting director of Mercedes, his then sportscar team. Later he had a brief return to F1 in 1990, doing most of the test driving for the Modena Lambo project.

Returning to sports cars, Baldi won the Le Mans 24 Hours race in 1994, sharing the Dauer 962 Le Mans (a modified Porsche 962) with Yannick Dalmas and Hurley Haywood. He also won the 24 Hours of Daytona in 1998 and 2002, and the 12 Hours of Sebring, again in 1998, with Arie Luyendyk and Didier Theys.

== Racing record ==
=== Career summary ===
Season	Series	Team	Races	Wins	Poles	F/Laps	Podiums	Points	Position
1976	Coppa Renault 5 Elf		11	1	?	?	5	80	**3rd**
1977	Coppa Renault 5 Elf		10	3	?	4	7	95	**1st**
1977	Renault 5 European Cup		?	2	?	1	4	52	**1st**
1978	Italian Formula Three		?	?	?	?	?	26	7th
1978	European Formula Three	Scuderia Tricolore	2	0	0	0	1	4	16th
1979	Italian Formula Three		?	1	?	1	?	35	**3rd**
1979	European Formula Three	Scuderia Tricolore	10	0	1	1	3	22	4th
1980	European Formula Three	Mauro Baldi	14	3	2	3	5	45	4th
1980	Italian Formula Three		?	?	?	?	?	13	8th
1980	German Formula Three	Automobiles Martini	2	0	0	0	0	0	NC
1981	European Formula Three	Euroracing	14	8	7	6	11	94	**1st**
1981	Italian Formula Three	Euroracing	?	?	?	?	?	27	6th
1981	German Formula Three	Euroracing	1	0	0	0	0	0	NC†
1982	Formula One	Arrows Racing Team	11	0	0	0	0	2	25th
1982	World Sportscar Championship	Momo Racing	3	0	0	0	0	11	38th
1983	Formula One	Marlboro Team Alfa Romeo	15	0	0	0	0	3	16th
1984	Formula One	Spirit Racing	7	0	0	0	0	0	NC
1984	World Sportscar Championship	Martini Racing	4	0	0	0	1	28	19th
1984	World Sportscar Championship	Jolly Club	1	0	0	0	0	28	19th
1984	24 Hours of Le Mans	Martini Racing	1	0	0	0	0	N/A	DNF
1985	World Sportscar Championship	Martini Racing	7	1	0	0	2	36	13th
1985	IMSA GT Championship	Bayside Disposal	2	0	0	0	2	0	NC
1985	Formula One	Spirit Enterprises Ltd.	3	0	0	0	0	0	NC
1985	24 Hours of Le Mans	Martini Racing	1	0	0	0	0	N/A	7th
1986	World Sportscar Championship	Liqui Moly Equipe	5	1	0	0	2	38	9th
1986	24 Hours of Le Mans	Liqui Moly Equipe	1	0	0	0	0	N/A	9th
1987	World Sportscar Championship	Liqui Moly Equipe/Britten-Lloyd Racing	9	1	1	0	3	58	8th
1987	All-Japan Sports Prototype Championship	Toyota Team TOM'S	1	0	0	0	0	12	22nd
1987	World Touring Car Championship	CiBiEmme Sport	1	0	0	0	0	0	NC
1988	World Sportscar Championship	Team Sauber Mercedes	10	2	7	2	7	188	**3rd**
1988	IMSA GT Championship	Busby Racing	6	0	1	0	2	50	13th
1988	1988 24 Hours of Le Mans	Team Sauber Mercedes	1	0	0	0	0	N/A	DNS
1989	World Sportscar Championship	Team Sauber Mercedes	8	3	5	4	6	102	**3rd**
1989	24 Hours of Le Mans	Team Sauber Mercedes	1	0	0	0	1	N/A	**2nd**
1989	IMSA GT Championship	Momo-Gebhardt Racing	1	0	0	0	0	0	NC
1990	World Sportscar Championship	Team Sauber Mercedes	9	6	7	3	6	49.5	**1st**
1990	IMSA GT Championship	Busby Racing	1	0	0	0	0	0	NC
1991	World Sportscar Championship	Peugeot Talbot Sport	7	1	0	0	3	69	**3rd**
1991	24 Hours of Le Mans	Peugeot Talbot Sport	1	0	0	0	0	N/A	DNF
1992	World Sportscar Championship	Peugeot Talbot Sport	6	2	0	1	4	64	**3rd**
1992	24 Hours of Le Mans	Peugeot Talbot Sport	1	0	0	0	1	N/A	**3rd**
1993	Italian Superturismo Championship	Peugeot Talbot Sport	1	0	0	0	0	6	22nd
1993	24 Hours of Le Mans	Peugeot Talbot Sport	1	0	0	0	1	N/A	**3rd**
1994	IMSA GT Championship	Euromotorsport	3	0	1	0	0	13	43rd
1994	24 Hours of Le Mans	Le Mans Porsche Team / Joest Racing	1	1	0	0	1	N/A	**1st**
1994	SCCA Pro Racing World Challenge	Porsche	?	1	?	?	?	0	NC
1994	PPG Indy Car World Series	Payton/Coyne Racing	1	0	0	0	0	0	NC
1995	IMSA GT Championship	Scandia Racing Team	11	1	4	1	5	245	**3rd**
1996	IMSA GT Championship	Scandia Racing Team	2	0	0	0	1	29	33rd
1997	FIA GT Championship	JB Racing	5	0	0	0	0	0	NC
1997	FIA GT Championship	Konrad Motorsport	4	0	0	0	0	0	NC
1997	24 Hours of Le Mans	Konrad Motorsport	1	0	0	0	0	N/A	DNF
1998	IMSA GT Championship	Momo Doran Racing	1	1	0	0	1	0	NC
1998	International Sports Racing Series	JB Racing Giesse Team Ferrari	1	0	0	1	0	0	NC
1998	24 Hours of Le Mans	Moretti Racing	1	0	0	0	1	N/A	14th
1998	24 Hours of Daytona	Doran/Moretti Racing	1	1	0	1	1	N/A	**1st**
1999	SportsRacing World Cup	JB Giesse Team Ferrari	8	1	0	1	4	85	5th
1999	American Le Mans Series	Doran Enterprises	3	0	0	0	1	31	34th
1999	24 Hours of Le Mans	JB Racing	1	0	0	0	0	N/A	DNF
2000	SportsRacing World Cup	R&M	6	1	0	1	3	51	12th
2000	Grand American Road Racing Championship	Doran/Lista Racing	2	1	0	0	1	85	24th
2000	American Le Mans Series	Doran/Lista Racing	1	0	0	0	0	20	40th
2000	24 Hours of Le Mans	Team Den Blå Avis	1	0	0	0	0	N/A	NC
2001	Grand American Road Racing Championship	Lista Doran Racing	7	2	1	0	6	267	8th
2001	FIA Sportscar Championship	R&M	8	0	0	0	2	41	13th
2002	FIA Sportscar Championship	R&M	5	0	0	0	3	44	5th
2002	Rolex Sports Car Series	Doran Lista Racing	4	2	0	0	3	130	7th
2002	American Le Mans Series	Doran Lista Racing	1	0	0	0	0	0	NC
2002	24 Hours of Daytona	Doran Lista Racing	1	1	?	?	1	N/A	**1st**
2003	FIA Sportscar Championship	R&M	1	0	0	0	0	5	27th
2003	Rolex Sports Car Series	Ferri Competizione	1	0	0	0	0	26	28th
2003	American Le Mans Series	Ferri Competizione	1	0	0	0	0	4	60th

^{†} As Baldi was a guest driver, he was ineligible for championship points.

=== Complete European Formula 3 results ===
(key) (Races in bold indicate pole position) (Races in italics indicate fastest lap)

Year	Team	Engine	1	2	3	4	5	6	7	8	9	10	11	12	13	14	15	16	Pos.	Pts
1978	Mauro Baldi	Toyota	ZAN	NÜR	ÖST	ZOL	IMO; DNQ	NÜR	DIJ	MNZ; DNQ	PER; 11	MAG	KNU	KAR	DON	KAS	JAR	VLL; 3	16th	4
1979	Mauro Baldi	Toyota	VLL; 3	ÖST; Ret	ZOL; Ret	MAG; 9	DON; Ret	ZAN; 2	PER; 5	**MNZ**; 2	KNU; Ret	KIN; Ret	JAR	KAS					4th	22
1980	Ecurie Oreca	Renault	NÜR; 4	ÖST; 8	ZOL; 15	MAG; 5	**ZAN**; 1	LAC; 3	**MUG**; 3	MNZ; 18	MIS; 1	KNU; 11		**JAR**; 1	KAS; 5	ZOL; 4			4th	45
1980	Ecurie Oreca	Toyota											SIL; Ret						4th	45
1981	Euroracing	Alfa Romeo	VLL; 1	**NÜR**; 5	DON; 6	**ÖST**; 1	**ZOL**; 1	**MAG**; 2	LAC; 6	**ZAN**; 1	SIL; 2	CET; 1	MIS; 1	KNU; 1	**JAR**; 2	**IMO**; 1	**MUG**; DNS		**1st**	**94**

=== Complete Formula One results ===
(key)

Year	Entrant	Chassis	Engine	1	2	3	4	5	6	7	8	9	10	11	12	13	14	15	16	WDC	Points
1982	Arrows Racing Team	Arrows A4	Cosworth V8	RSA; DNQ	BRA; 10	USW; DNQ	SMR	BEL; NC	MON; DNQ	DET; Ret	CAN; 8	NED; 6	GBR; 9	FRA; Ret	GER; Ret	AUT; 6	SUI; DNQ		CPL; 11	25th	2
1982	Arrows Racing Team	Arrows A5	Cosworth V8															ITA; 12		25th	2
1983	Marlboro Team Alfa Romeo	Alfa Romeo 183T	Alfa Romeo V8	BRA; Ret	USW; Ret	FRA; Ret	SMR; 10	MON; 6	BEL; Ret	DET; 12	CAN; 10	GBR; 7	GER; Ret	AUT; Ret	NED; 5	ITA; Ret	EUR; Ret	RSA; Ret		16th	3
1984	Spirit Racing	Spirit 101	Hart Straight-4	BRA; Ret	RSA; 8	BEL; Ret	SMR; 8	FRA; Ret	MON; DNQ	CAN	DET	DAL	GBR	GER	AUT	NED	ITA	EUR; 8	POR; 15	NC	0
1985	Spirit Enterprises Ltd.	Spirit 101D	Hart Straight-4	BRA; Ret	POR; Ret	SMR; Ret	MON	CAN	DET	FRA	GBR	GER	AUT	NED	ITA	BEL	EUR	RSA	AUS	NC	0

=== 24 Hours of Le Mans results ===
Year	Team	Co-Drivers	Car	Class	Laps	Pos.	Class Pos.
1984	(Italy) Martini Racing	(Italy) Paolo Barilla (West Germany) Hans Heyer	Lancia LC2-Ferrari	C1	275	DNF	DNF
1985	(Italy) Martini Lancia	(France) Henri Pescarolo	Lancia LC2-Ferrari	C1	358	7th	7th
1986	(United Kingdom) Liqui Moly Equipe	(United States) Price Cobb (United States) Rob Dyson	Porsche 956 GTi	C1	318	9th	7th
1988	(Switzerland) Team Sauber Mercedes	(United Kingdom) James Weaver (West Germany) Jochen Mass	Sauber C9-Mercedes	C1	-	DNS	DNS
1989	(Switzerland) Team Sauber Mercedes	(United Kingdom) Kenny Acheson (Italy) Gianfranco Brancatelli	Sauber C9-Mercedes	C1	384	**2nd**	**2nd**
1991	(France) Peugeot Talbot Sport	(France) Philippe Alliot (France) Jean-Pierre Jabouille	Peugeot 905	C1	22	DNF	DNF
1992	(France) Peugeot Talbot Sport	(France) Philippe Alliot (France) Jean-Pierre Jabouille	Peugeot 905 Evo 1B	C1	345	**3rd**	**3rd**
1993	(France) Peugeot Talbot Sport	(France) Philippe Alliot (France) Jean-Pierre Jabouille	Peugeot 905 Evo 1B	C1	367	**3rd**	**3rd**
1994	(Germany) Le Mans Porsche Team (Germany) Joest Racing	(France) Yannick Dalmas (United States) Hurley Haywood	Dauer 962 Le Mans	GT1	344	**1st**	**1st**
1997	(Germany) Konrad Motorsport	(Austria) Franz Konrad (United Kingdom) Robert Nearn	Porsche 911 GT1	GT1	138	DNF	DNF
1998	(Italy) Moretti Racing	(Italy) Gianpiero Moretti (Belgium) Didier Theys	Ferrari 333 SP	LMP1	311	14th	**3rd**
1999	(France) JB Racing	(France) Jérôme Policand (Italy) Christian Pescatori	Ferrari 333 SP	LMP	71	DNF	DNF
2000	(Denmark) Team Den Blå Avis	(Denmark) John Nielsen (Germany) Klaus Graf	Panoz LMP-1 Roadster-S-Élan	LMP900	205	NC	NC

=== American Open Wheel racing results ===
(key)

==== IndyCar World Series ====
Year	Team	No.	1	2	3	4	5	6	7	8	9	10	11	12	13	14	15	16	Rank	Points	Ref
1994	Payton/Coyne Racing	19	SRF	PHX	LBH	INDY	MIL	DET	POR	CLE	TOR	MIS	MDO; 19	NHM	VAN	ROA	NZR	LAG	**47th**	**0**	

== Sources ==
- Profile at www.grandprix.com

Sporting positions
Preceded by Yves Frémont	Coupe d'Europe Renault 5 Alpine; Champion; 1977	Succeeded by Wolfgang Schütz
Preceded by Alain Prost	Monaco Formula Three; Race Winner; 1980	Succeeded by Alain Ferté
Preceded by Michele Alboreto	European Formula Three Championship; Champion; 1981	Succeeded by Oscar Larrauri
Preceded by Jean-Louis Schlesser	World Sportscar Championship; Champion; 1990; With: Jean-Louis Schlesser	Succeeded by Teo Fabi
Preceded by Geoff Brabham; Christophe Bouchut; Éric Hélary	Winner of the 24 Hours of Le Mans; 1994; With: Yannick Dalmas & Hurley Haywood	Succeeded by Yannick Dalmas; J.J. Lehto; Masanori Sekiya
