= 2024 Renault Clio Cup Series =

59th season of Renault one-make racing series

The 2024 Renault Clio Cup Series was the 59th season of Renault one-make racing series. It was the fifth season that uses Renault Clio R.S. V. The season began on 30 March at Nogaro and ended on 20 October at Monza.

Rangoni Corse drivers won all the general drivers classifications: Gabriele Torelli won the Series overall classification and the French Cup, Damiano Puccetti won the Spanish Cup, Lorenzo van Riet won the Mid-Europe Cup, and Anthony Jurado won the Italian Cup. The team also won the overall teams classification.

== Calendar ==
The calendar features 9 rounds across four regional cups: France, Spain, Italy, and Mid-Europe. Europe Cup no longer counts as a regional cup as it is incorporated into the overall series. Each round would feature 2 races each.

| Round | Circuit | Date | (France) | (Spain) | (Italy) | ME | Map of circuit locations |
|---|---|---|---|---|---|---|---|
| 1 | (France) Circuit Paul Armagnac, Nogaro | 30 March—1 April | Yes | Yes | | | 2024 Renault Clio Cup Series is located in Europe |
| 2 | (Portugal) Algarve International Circuit, Portimão | 26–28 April | Yes | Yes | | | 2024 Renault Clio Cup Series is located in Europe |
| 3 | (Germany) Hockenheimring Baden-Württemberg, Hockenheim | 10–12 May | Yes | | | Yes | 2024 Renault Clio Cup Series is located in Europe |
| 4 | (Italy) Misano World Circuit Marco Simoncelli, Misano Adriatico | 17–19 May | | Yes | Yes | | 2024 Renault Clio Cup Series is located in Europe |
| 5 | (Belgium) Circuit de Spa-Francorchamps, Stavelot | 31 May—2 June | | Yes | Yes | Yes | 2024 Renault Clio Cup Series is located in Europe |
| 6 | (France) Circuit de Nevers Magny-Cours, Magny-Cours | 23–25 August | Yes | | | Yes | 2024 Renault Clio Cup Series is located in Europe |
| 7 | (Spain) Circuit de Barcelona-Catalunya, Montmeló | 12–14 September | | Yes | Yes | Yes | 2024 Renault Clio Cup Series is located in Europe |
| 8 | (France) Circuit Paul Ricard, Le Castellet, Var | 4–6 October | Yes | | Yes | Yes | 2024 Renault Clio Cup Series is located in Europe |
| 9 | (Italy) Autodromo Nazionale di Monza, Monza | 18–20 October | | | Yes | | 2024 Renault Clio Cup Series is located in Europe |

== Entry list ==
Each driver may register for either the Series overall classification only, overall with one regional cups, or up to two regionals without entering overall classification.

| Team | No. | Drivers | Class | Regions | | Rounds |
|---|---|---|---|---|---|---|
| (France) GPA Racing | 1 | (France) David Pouget | | CCS | FR | All |
| (France) GPA Racing | 13 | (Italy) Alex Lancellotti | C | IT | | 4–5, 7–9 |
| (France) GPA Racing | 15 | (France) Stéphane Nevers | G | FR | | 8 |
| (France) GPA Racing | 18 | (France) Cédric Delcroix | C | FR | | 1–3 |
| (France) GPA Racing | 20 | (France) Yann-Maël Navillod | G | FR | | 1 |
| (France) GPA Racing | 23 | (France) Alexandre Finkelstein | | FR | | 1–3, 6, 8 |
| (France) GPA Racing | 25 | (France) Alexandre Albouy | C | FR | | 1, 8 |
| (France) GPA Racing | 42 | (Spain) Mariano Alonso | | CCS | | 4, 9 |
| (France) GPA Racing | 56 | (Republic of Ireland) Harry McGovern | J | CCS | | 5–6 |
| (France) GPA Racing | 64 | (Spain) Gabriel Alonso | G | CCS | | 2, 7, 9 |
| (France) GPA Racing | 72 | (France) Kévin Jimenez | C | FR | | 1 |
| (France) GPA Racing | 84 | (Italy) Mattia Lancellotti | C | IT | | 9 |
| (France) GPA Racing | 85 | (France) Benjamin Cauvas | C | CCS | ME | 2–3, 5–8 |
| (France) GPA Racing | 86 | (Republic of Ireland) Jack Byrne | J | CCS | ME | All |
| (France) GPA Racing | 95 | (France) Gaël Rostant | G | ES | | 1–2, 5, 7 |
| (France) GPA Racing | 777 | (France) Florent Grizaud | C | FR | | 1 |
| (France) GPA Racing | 999 | (France) "HORN" | G | CCS | IT | 1, 3–9 |
| (Italy) Sevenhills Motorsport | 2 | (Italy) Adam Sascha | J | IT | | 4–5, 7 |
| (Italy) Sevenhills Motorsport | 17 | (Italy) Manuel Stefani | G | IT | | 4, 7 |
| (Italy) Sevenhills Motorsport | 57 | (Costa Rica) Aldo Vincenti Castillo | C | IT | | 4–5, 7 |
| (Italy) Sevenhills Motorsport | 65 | (Italy) Sebastian Gavazza | J | IT | | 4–5, 7, 9 |
| (Italy) Sevenhills Motorsport | 84 | (Italy) Mattia Lancellotti | C | IT | | 4–5 |
| (Switzerland) Stucki Motorsport | 3 | (Switzerland) Daniel Nyffeler | C | ME | | 3, 5–8 |
| (Switzerland) Stucki Motorsport | 9 | (Switzerland) Andreas Stucki | C | ME | | 3, 5–8 |
| (Switzerland) Stucki Motorsport | 14 | (Germany) Udo Brunner | G | ME | | 3, 5–8 |
| (France) JSB Compétition | 4 | (France) Aurélien Renet | C | FR | ME | 1, 3, 5–8 |
| (Italy) Rangoni Corse | 5 | (France) Anthony Jurado | | CCS | IT | All |
| (Italy) Rangoni Corse | 12 | (Italy) Gabriele Torelli | | CCS | FR | All |
| (Italy) Rangoni Corse | 43 | (Italy) Damiano Puccetti | J | CCS | ES | All |
| (Italy) Rangoni Corse | 107 | (Netherlands) Lorenzo van Riet | C | CCS | ME | All |
| (Italy) Rangoni Corse | 165 | (Italy) Rolando Bordacchini | G | IT | | 4–5, 7–9 |
| (France) T2CM | 7 | (France) Mickaël Carrée | G | CCS | FR | All |
| (France) T2CM | 54 | (France) Sébastien Gehin | G | ME | | 5–6, 8 |
| (France) T2CM | 133 | (France) Samuel Chaligne | G | FR | ES | 1–8 |
| (France) T2CM | 215 | (France) Maxime Guedou | C | FR | | 6 |
| (Italy) EsseCorse | 8 | (Italy) Andrea Cordini | G | IT | | 4, 9 |
| (Italy) EsseCorse | 73 | (Italy) Sandro Cutini | C | IT | | 9 |
| (Italy) EsseCorse | 115 | (Italy) Luca Gresini | C | IT | | 4 |
| (Italy) EsseCorse | 121 | (Italy) Ronnie Stefani | J | IT | | 4–5, 7–9 |
| (Italy) EsseCorse | 207 | (Italy) Cristian Ricciarini | G | IT | | 4–5, 7–9 |
| (Spain) AST Competition | 10 | (Netherlands) Mauro Polderman | J | CCS | ME | All |
| (Spain) AST Competition | 21 | (Netherlands) Stephan Polderman | G | CCS | IT | All |
| (Spain) AST Competition | 55 | (Netherlands) René Steenmetz | G | CCS | ES | 1–2, 5, 7, 9 |
| (Spain) AST Competition | 113 | (Spain) Adrián Schimpf | J | CCS | IT | 1–4, 6 |
| (Spain) AST Competition | 199 | (Spain) Alejandro Schimpf | J | CCS | ES | 1–4 |
| (Serbia) Tempo Racing | 11 | (Serbia) Nikola Miljkovic | C | CCS | ME | 1–3, 5–9 |
| (Serbia) Tempo Racing | 219 | (Serbia) Milan Popović | C | CCS | | 1, 3, 7, 9 |
| (Italy) MC Motortecnica | 16 | (Italy) Giacomo Trebbi | C | IT | | 4–5, 7–9 |
| (Italy) MC Motortecnica | 19 | (Italy) Gianalberto Coldani | C | IT | | 4, 9 |
| (Italy) MC Motortecnica | 22 | (Italy) Ludovico Longoni | C | CCS | IT | 1–2, 4–5, 7–9 |
| (Italy) MC Motortecnica | 53 | (Italy) "Nava" | G | CCS | | All |
| (Italy) MC Motortecnica | 60 | (Italy) Leonardo Arduini | J | CCS | IT | All |
| (Italy) MC Motortecnica | 372 | (Italy) Andrea Chierichetti | G | ES | IT | 1–2, 4–5, 7, 9 |
| (France) Milan Compétition | 27 | (Portugal) Manuel Fernandes | C | FR | | 2 |
| (France) Milan Compétition | 31 | (France) Jérémy Bordagaray | C | FR | | 1 |
| (France) Milan Compétition | 35 | (France) Thomas Compain | J | FR | ME | 1–3, 5–8 |
| (France) Milan Compétition | 47 | (Spain) Jordi Palomeras Ventós | C | IT | | 4 |
| (France) Milan Compétition | 48 | (France) Nicolas Milan | | CCS | FR | All |
| (France) Milan Compétition | 69 | (Italy) Quinto Stefana | G | CCS | IT | 1–4 |
| (France) Milan Compétition | 93 | (France) Nicolas Milan Jr. | J | FR | | 6–8 |
| (France) Milan Compétition | 131 | (France) Alexandre Barcet | J | FR | | 1 |
| (France) Milan Compétition | 131 | (France) Steve Compain | G | FR | | 3 |
| (France) Milan Compétition | 131 | (Belgium) Lucas Cartelle | J | CCS | IT | 5–7 |
| (France) Milan Compétition | 135 | (France) Rodrigues Dagnet | G | FR | | 6, 8 |
| (France) VIC'TEAM ^{4–7} (France) DonCare Racing ^{8} | 28 | (France) David Pajot | G | IT | | 4–5, 7–8 |
| (Norway) TF Performance | 30 | (Norway) Knut Eirik Knudsen | C | ME | | 3, 5–8 |
| (Norway) TF Performance | 79 | (Norway) Felix Heiberg | J | ME | | 3, 5–8 |
| (France) GM Sport | 33 | (France) Michel Faye | G | CCS | FR | All |
| (France) GM Sport | 39 | (Czech Republic) Jaroslav Honzik | C | ME | | 3, 5–8 |
| (France) GM Sport | 99 | (France) Guillaume Maio | C | CCS | ME | All |
| (France) GM Sport | 100 | (France) Romain Lavocat | C | FR | | 1 |
| (France) GM Sport | 100 | (France) Romain Lavocat | C | ME | | 3, 5–8 |
| (France) GM Sport | 158 | (France) Florian Venturi | J | FR | | 1–3, 6 |
| (France) GM Sport | 193 | (France) Loic Labeda | C | CCS | | 9 |
| (France) COMTE Racing | 37 | (France) Calvin Comte | C | FR | | 1–3, 6, 8 |
| (France) COMTE Racing | 58 | (France) Pierre Bredeaux | J | FR | | 1–3, 6 |
| (France) Team Lucas | 40 | (France) Laurent Dziadus | G | FR | | 1 |
| (France) Team Lucas | 40 | (France) Laurent Dziadus | G | ME | | 3, 5–6 |
| (Italy) FARO Racing | 67 | (Slovenia) Fabijan Miha | C | IT | | 4 |
| (Italy) FARO Racing | 73 | (Italy) Sandro Cutini | C | IT | | 4–5, 7 |
| (Slovenia) BA Motorsport | 67 | (Slovenia) Fabijan Miha | C | IT | | 5 |
| (Poland) UNIQ Racing | 45 | (India) Rahil Taneja | G | IT | | 8 |
| (Poland) UNIQ Racing | 75 | (Mexico) Eduardo Miranda | J | IT | | 4–5, 7 |
| (Poland) UNIQ Racing | 90 | (Turkey) Emir Saraç | C | IT | | 4–5, 7–9 |
| (Poland) UNIQ Racing | 555 | (Egypt) Youssef Gaber | C | IT | | 4–5, 7–9 |
| (France) Inter Generation | 77 | (France) Jean-Louis Carponcin | G | FR | | 1–3, 8 |
| (Italy) ASD Scuderia Venanzio | 51 | (Italy) Francesco Pagano | J | IT | | 9 |
| (Serbia) AKSK Crvena Zvezda | 111 | (Serbia) Nikola Tošić | J | CCS | ME | All |
| (Denmark) Dall Racing | 112 | (Denmark) Mathias Dall | J | ME | | 3, 5 |
| (France) FAS Competition | 170 | (France) Rémi Belleville | C | ME | | 3, 5–8 |
| (Italy) Tuder Motorsport | 238 | (Italy) Davide Rosini | C | IT | | 4 |
| (France) P2B Racing Team | 437 | (France) Quentin Buret | C | FR | | 8 |
| (United Kingdom) LDR Performance Tuning | 991 | (United Kingdom) Ben Jenkins | J | IT | | 9 |

| Icon | Class |
Region
| CCS | Clio Cup Series |
| FR | France |
| ES | Spain |
| IT | Italy |
| ME | Mid-Europe |
Drivers
| J | Juniors |
| C | Challengers |
| G | Gentlemen |

== Results ==
| Round | | Circuit | Race Overall Winner | France Cup | (Spain) España Cup | (Italy) Italia Cup | Mid-Europe Cup |
|---|---|---|---|---|---|---|---|
| 1 | R1 | (France) Nogaro | (France) Anthony Jurado | (Italy) Gabriele Torelli | (Netherlands) René Steenmetz | | |
| 1 | R2 | (France) Nogaro | (France) Guillaume Maio | (France) Nicolas Milan | (Italy) Damiano Puccetti | | |
| 2 | R1 | (Portugal) Portimão | (France) Nicolas Milan | (France) Nicolas Milan | (Spain) Adrián Schimpf | | |
| 2 | R2 | (Portugal) Portimão | (France) Anthony Jurado | (Italy) Gabriele Torelli | (Spain) Alejandro Schimpf | | |
| 3 | R1 | (Germany) Hockenheim | (Italy) Gabriele Torelli | (Italy) Gabriele Torelli | | | (Netherlands) Lorenzo van Riet |
| 3 | R2 | (Germany) Hockenheim | (France) David Pouget | (France) David Pouget | | | (France) Guillaume Maio |
| 4 | R1 | (Italy) Misano | (Italy) Gabriele Torelli | | (Italy) Damiano Puccetti | (France) Anthony Jurado | |
| 4 | R2 | (Italy) Misano | (Italy) Gabriele Torelli | | (Italy) Damiano Puccetti | (Spain) Adrián Schimpf | |
| 5 | R1 | (Belgium) Spa-Francorchamps | (Italy) Gabriele Torelli | | (Netherlands) René Steenmetz | (Italy) Alex Lancellotti | (Netherlands) Lorenzo van Riet |
| 5 | R2 | (Belgium) Spa-Francorchamps | (France) David Pouget | | (Italy) Damiano Puccetti | (Italy) Alex Lancellotti | (Serbia) Nikola Miljkovic |
| 6 | R1 | (France) Magny-Cours | (France) Anthony Jurado | (Italy) Gabriele Torelli | | | (France) Aurélien Renet |
| 6 | R2 | (France) Magny-Cours | (Italy) Gabriele Torelli | (Italy) Gabriele Torelli | | | (Serbia) Nikola Miljkovic |
| 7 | R1 | (Spain) Barcelona | (Italy) Gabriele Torelli | | (Italy) Damiano Puccetti | (France) Anthony Jurado | (Serbia) Nikola Miljkovic |
| 7 | R2 | (Spain) Barcelona | (Italy) Gabriele Torelli | | (Italy) Damiano Puccetti | (France) Anthony Jurado | (Netherlands) Mauro Polderman |
| 8 | R1 | (France) Paul Ricard | (France) Anthony Jurado | (Italy) Gabriele Torelli | | (France) Anthony Jurado | (France) Aurélien Renet |
| 8 | R2 | (France) Paul Ricard | (France) David Pouget | (France) David Pouget | | (France) Anthony Jurado | (France) Guillaume Maio |
| 9 | R1 | (Italy) Monza | (France) David Pouget | | | (Italy) Alex Lancellotti | |
| 9 | R2 | (Italy) Monza | (France) Nicolas Milan | | | (France) Anthony Jurado | |

== Championship standings ==
=== Points systems ===
In each race, points are awarded for the top 20 (Overall and Regionals) or top 10 (Juniors, Challengers and Gentlemen, for each Regional Cups). Entries are required to complete 90% of the winning car's race distance (rounded down in laps) in order to be classified and earn points.

==== Overall and Regionals ====
| Position | 1st | 2nd | 3rd | 4th | 5th | 6th | 7th | 8th | 9th | 10th | 11th | 12th | 13th | 14th | 15th | 16th | 17th | 18th | 19th | 20th |
| Points | 50 | 42 | 36 | 33 | 30 | 27 | 24 | 22 | 20 | 18 | 16 | 14 | 12 | 10 | 8 | 6 | 4 | 3 | 2 | 1 |

==== Juniors, Challengers and Gentlemen ====
Sub-classifications may be established based on driver's age and experience:

- Juniors: Drivers 22 years old and younger.
- Challengers: Drivers 23-44 years old with no success record, defined as a race win or championship podium finish in recognized racing series, including past Renault cup editions.
- Gentlemen: Drivers 45 years old and older with no success record.

| Position | 1st | 2nd | 3rd | 4th | 5th | 6th | 7th | 8th | 9th | 10th |
| Points | 20 | 15 | 12 | 10 | 8 | 6 | 4 | 3 | 2 | 1 |

=== Clio Cup Series ===
==== Drivers Overall Classification ====
| Pos. | Driver | (France) NOG | | (Portugal) POR | | (Germany) HOC | | (Italy) MIS | | (Belgium) SPA | | (France) MAG | | (Spain) BAR | | (France) LEC | | (Italy) MON | | Points |
|---|---|---|---|---|---|---|---|---|---|---|---|---|---|---|---|---|---|---|---|---|
| 1 | (Italy) Gabriele Torelli | 2 | 6 | 6 | 2 | 1 | 2 | 1 | 1 | 1 | 2 | 2 | 1 | 1 | 1 | 2 | 6 | Ret | 3 | 737 |
| 2 | (France) Nicolas Milan | 5 | 2 | 1 | 4 | 4 | 3 | 4 | 2 | 3 | 3 | 8 | 15 | 2 | 3 | 5 | 3 | 3 | 1 | 671 |
| 3 | (France) David Pouget | 3 | 20 | 3 | 26 | 3 | 1 | 2 | 11 | 2 | 1 | 3 | 3 | 3 | 4 | 4 | 1 | 1 | 4 | 646 |
| 4 | (France) Anthony Jurado | 1 | 9 | 2 | 1 | 2 | 4 | 3 | 37† | 5 | 40 | 1 | 4 | 5 | 2 | 1 | 4 | 5 | 2 | 638 |
| 5 | (France) Guillaume Maio | 14 | 1 | 13 | 6 | 28 | 7 | Ret | 12 | 22 | 14 | 9 | 9 | 10 | 8 | 10 | 7 | 7 | 14 | 408 |
| 6 | (Netherlands) Lorenzo van Riet | 8 | 16 | 16 | 14 | 8 | 13 | 6 | 26 | 6 | 5 | 20 | 8 | 8 | 13 | 11 | 12 | 10 | 5 | 405 |
| 7 | (Italy) Leonardo Arduini | 12 | 15 | 12 | 13 | 7 | 11 | 12 | 32 | 13 | 11 | 10 | 6 | 14 | 14 | 12 | 15 | 6 | 11 | 392 |
| 8 | (Italy) Damiano Puccetti | 20 | 19 | 14 | 9 | 11 | 36 | 9 | 3 | 15 | 13 | 11 | 21 | 6 | 6 | 14 | 14 | 8 | 9 | 377 |
| 9 | (Republic of Ireland) Jack Byrne | 9 | 4 | 11 | 10 | 9 | 15 | 30 | 15 | Ret | 8 | 13 | Ret | Ret | 9 | 36 | 20 | 4 | 15 | 312 |
| 10 | (Serbia) Nikola Miljkovic | 22 | 24 | 10 | 8 | Ret | 16 | | | 9 | 4 | DSQ | 2 | 4 | 41 | 17 | 43† | 14 | 33 | 258 |
| 11 | (France) Mickaël Carrée | 7 | 18 | 25 | 18 | 18 | 17 | 17 | 10 | 44 | 24 | 12 | 11 | 33 | 19 | 21 | 23 | 27 | 16 | 253 |
| 12 | (Netherlands) Mauro Polderman | 17 | Ret | Ret | 20 | 15 | 37 | 16 | 25 | 11 | 9 | DSQ | 10 | 7 | 5 | 9 | 25 | Ret | 35 | 234 |
| 13 | (Netherlands) Stephan Polderman | 39† | 22 | 18 | 17 | 23 | 29 | 35 | 31 | 14 | 37 | 24 | 25 | 13 | 26 | 15 | 13 | 15 | 20 | 196 |
| 14 | (Italy) Ludovico Longoni | 15 | 23 | 15 | 11 | | | 15 | Ret | 30 | 16 | | | 18 | 23 | 26 | 19 | 9 | 22 | 182 |
| 15 | (Serbia) Nikola Tošić | 29 | 28 | 17 | Ret | 19 | 14 | 22 | 19 | 25 | 22 | 15 | 14 | 25 | Ret | 22 | Ret | 17 | 23 | 176 |
| 16 | (Spain) Alejandro Schimpf | 34 | Ret | 7 | 7 | Ret | 12 | 11 | 4 | | | | | | | | | | | 141 |
| 17 | (Spain) Adrián Schimpf | 23 | 30 | 8 | 15 | 6 | 5 | DNS | 6 | | | DNS | Ret | | | | | | | 140 |
| 18 | (Italy) "Nava" | DNS | DNS | 26 | 24 | 29 | 31 | 38† | 23 | 32 | Ret | 31 | 23 | 32 | 25 | 23 | 35 | 11 | 17 | 113 |
| 19 | (France) Benjamin Cauvas | | | 19 | 21 | 16 | 21 | | | 40 | Ret | 19 | Ret | DSQ | 15 | 24 | 17 | | | 93 |
| 20 | (France) "HORN" | 37† | 35† | | | 25 | 33 | 26 | DNS | 35 | DSQ | 25 | 27 | 23 | 28 | 38 | 28 | 22 | 26 | 77 |
| 21 | (France) Michel Faye | 36 | 25 | 29 | 28 | 31 | 30 | 33 | 28 | 38 | 36 | 34 | 26 | 36 | 39 | 32 | 36 | 28 | 31 | 75 |
| 22 | (Netherlands) René Steenmetz | 19 | Ret | Ret | DNS | | | | | 12 | DSQ | | | 16 | DSQ | | | 33 | 28 | 57 |
| 23 | (Italy) Quinto Stefana | 21 | 27 | 20 | 19 | 36 | 24 | Ret | 24 | | | | | | | | | | | 53 |
| 24 | (Republic of Ireland) Harry McGovern | | | | | | | | | 17 | 15 | 17 | Ret | | | | | | | 46 |
| 25 | (Spain) Mariano Alonso | | | | | | | 19 | 30 | | | | | | | | | 19 | 19 | 44 |
| 26 | (Belgium) Lucas Cartelle | | | | | | | | | 18 | 41† | 30 | Ret | 29 | 21 | | | | | 39 |
| 27 | (Serbia) Milan Popović | 31 | 29 | | | 34 | 38 | | | | | | | 42 | 47† | | | Ret | 36 | 10 |
| 28 | (Spain) Gabriel Alonso | | | 32 | 30 | | | | | | | | | 46 | 40 | | | 34 | 34 | 5 |
Ineligible to score points
| — | (France) Loic Labeda | | | | | | | | | | | | | | | | | 26 | 18 | — |
Regional-only entries
| — | (France) Alexandre Finkelstein | 6 | 11 | 5 | 3 | 5 | 6 | | | | | 5 | Ret | | | 3 | 2 | | | — |
| — | (Italy) Alex Lancellotti | | | | | | | 5 | Ret | 4 | 7 | | | 27 | 12 | 6 | 5 | 2 | 6 | — |
| — | (France) Florian Venturi | 4 | 3 | 9 | 5 | 12 | 9 | | | | | 6 | 5 | | | | | | | — |
| — | (France) Aurélien Renet | 13 | 10 | | | Ret | 18 | | | Ret | 6 | 4 | 7 | 9 | Ret | 8 | 8 | | | — |
| — | (France) Pierre Bredeaux | 25 | 8 | 4 | 29 | Ret | Ret | | | | | 7 | Ret | | | | | | | — |
| — | (Italy) Cristian Ricciarini | | | | | | | 10 | 5 | 19 | 23 | | | 15 | 16 | 40 | WD | 13 | 10 | — |
| — | (France) Kévin Jimenez | 11 | 5 | | | | | | | | | | | | | | | | | — |
| — | (France) Thomas Compain | 10 | 7 | 30 | 12 | 14 | 10 | | | 7 | 10 | 23 | Ret | 22 | 7 | 19 | 10 | | | — |
| — | (Italy) Mattia Lancellotti | | | | | | | 7 | 7 | 10 | DNS | | | | | | | 20 | 7 | — |
| — | (France) Alexandre Albouy | 16 | 17 | | | | | | | | | | | | | 7 | 9 | | | — |
| — | (Italy) Giacomo Trebbi | | | | | | | 8 | 9 | 8 | 12 | | | 12 | 10 | 13 | 18 | Ret | 8 | — |
| — | (Switzerland) Andreas Stucki | | | | | 13 | 8 | | | Ret | DNS | 16 | 13 | 19 | 17 | 18 | 11 | | | — |
| — | (Spain) Jordi Palomeras Ventós | | | | | | | 13 | 8 | | | | | | | | | | | — |
| — | (Denmark) Mathias Dall | | | | | 10 | Ret | | | 16 | 17 | | | | | | | | | — |
| — | (Italy) Ronnie Stefani | | | | | | | 21 | DNS | 26 | 21 | | | 11 | 11 | Ret | DNS | 18 | 12 | — |
| — | (Italy) Gianalberto Coldani | | | | | | | 14 | 13 | | | | | | | | | 12 | Ret | — |
| — | (Norway) Knut Eirik Knudsen | | | | | 17 | 26 | | | 27 | 42† | 14 | 12 | 17 | Ret | 16 | 21 | | | — |
| — | (France) Calvin Comte | 26 | 12 | 23 | 23 | 20 | 23 | | | | | 21 | 16 | | | 31 | 31 | | | — |
| — | (Italy) Francesco Pagano | | | | | | | | | | | | | | | | | 16 | 13 | — |
| — | (France) Florent Grizaud | 32 | 13 | | | | | | | | | | | | | | | | | — |
| — | (France) Laurent Dziadus | 18 | 14 | | | 38† | DNS | | | Ret | Ret | 22 | 17 | | | | | | | — |
| — | (Mexico) Eduardo Miranda | | | | | | | 20 | 14 | 23 | 18 | | | 28 | 46† | | | | | — |
| — | (Czech Republic) Jaroslav Honzik | | | | | 26 | 20 | | | 20 | Ret | 27 | Ret | 24 | 20 | 28 | 16 | | | — |
| — | (France) Samuel Chaligne | 30 | 33 | 27 | 25 | 24 | 28 | 24 | 16 | DNQ | DNQ | 35 | 20 | 37 | 30 | 37 | 37 | | | — |
| — | (Portugal) Manuel Fernandes | | | 22 | 16 | | | | | | | | | | | | | | | — |
| — | (France) David Pajot | | | | | | | 37 | 17 | 21 | 20 | | | 21 | 29 | Ret | 27 | | | — |
| — | (Italy) Adam Sascha | | | | | | | 18 | 22 | 45 | 31 | | | 20 | 18 | | | | | — |
| — | (Norway) Felix Heiberg | | | | | 30 | 27 | | | 24 | 19 | 18 | 22 | 31 | 24 | 25 | 22 | | | — |
| — | (France) Rodrigues Dagnet | | | | | | | | | | | 28 | 18 | | | 44 | 26 | | | — |
| — | (Italy) Davide Rosini | | | | | | | Ret | 18 | | | | | | | | | | | — |
| — | (France) Cédric Delcroix | Ret | 34† | 24 | 22 | 22 | 19 | | | | | | | | | | | | | — |
| — | (France) Sébastien Gehin | | | | | | | | | 33 | 27 | 29 | 19 | | | 29 | 34 | | | — |
| — | (Italy) Sandro Cutini | | | | | | | 39† | 20 | 31 | 28 | | | 30 | 45 | | | 24 | 25 | — |
| — | (France) Quentin Buret | | | | | | | | | | | | | | | 20 | 33 | | | — |
| — | (Egypt) Youssef Gaber | | | | | | | 27 | 21 | 28 | 25 | | | 41 | 22 | 30 | 29 | 30 | 24 | — |
| — | (Switzerland) Daniel Nyffeler | | | | | 21 | 22 | | | 29 | Ret | 26 | 24 | 26 | 27 | 35 | 30 | | | — |
| — | (Italy) Andrea Chierichetti | 35 | 31 | 21 | Ret | | | 23 | Ret | 36 | 35 | | | 39 | 35 | | | 23 | 29 | — |
| — | (Turkey) Emir Saraç | | | | | | | 29 | Ret | 34 | 26 | | | 38 | 36 | 39 | Ret | 25 | 21 | — |
| — | (United Kingdom) Ben Jenkins | | | | | | | | | | | | | | | | | 21 | 30 | — |
| — | (France) Yann-Maël Navillod | 40† | 21 | | | | | | | | | | | | | | | | | — |
| — | (France) Gaël Rostant | 24 | 26 | 31 | 31 | | | | | 41 | 33 | | | 47 | 33 | | | | | — |
| — | (France) Romain Lavocat | 27 | 32 | | | 33 | 32 | | | 37 | 30 | 32 | 28 | 35 | 37 | 27 | 24 | | | — |
| — | (France) Steve Compain | | | | | 27 | 25 | | | | | | | | | | | | | — |
| — | (Italy) Luca Gresini | | | | | | | 25 | DSQ | | | | | | | | | | | — |
| — | (France) Jean-Louis Carponcin | 28 | Ret | 28 | 27 | 35 | 34 | | | | | | | | | 42 | WD | | | — |
| — | (Italy) Andrea Cordini | | | | | | | 28 | 27 | | | | | | | | | 29 | 32 | — |
| — | (Italy) Sebastian Gavazza | | | | | | | 34 | 36† | 39 | Ret | | | DNS | 31 | | | 31 | 27 | — |
| — | (Italy) Rolando Bordacchini | | | | | | | 31 | 29 | 43 | 34 | | | 45 | 42 | 41 | 40 | 32 | Ret | — |
| — | (Slovenia) Fabijan Miha | | | | | | | 36 | 33 | Ret | 29 | | | | | | | | | — |
| — | (France) Maxime Guedou | | | | | | | | | | | 37 | 29 | | | | | | | — |
| — | (France) Nicolas Milan Jr. | | | | | | | | | | | 33 | 30 | 34 | 32 | 46† | 32 | | | — |
| — | (Germany) Udo Brunner | | | | | 37 | 39 | | | 47 | 39 | 36 | 31 | 48 | 43 | 45 | 41 | | | — |
| — | (France) Rémi Belleville | | | | | 32 | 35 | | | 42 | 38 | Ret | 32 | 43 | 38 | 33 | 42 | | | — |
| — | (Costa Rica) Aldo Vincenti Castillo | | | | | | | 32 | 34 | 46 | 32 | | | 40 | 44 | | | | | — |
| — | (France) Jérémy Bordagaray | 33 | Ret | | | | | | | | | | | | | | | | | — |
| — | (Italy) Manuel Stefani | | | | | | | Ret | 35 | | | | | 44 | 34 | | | | | — |
| — | (France) Stéphane Nevers | | | | | | | | | | | | | | | 34 | 38 | | | — |
| — | (France) Alexandre Barcet | 38† | Ret | | | | | | | | | | | | | | | | | — |
| — | (India) Rahil Taneja | | | | | | | | | | | | | | | 43 | 39 | | | — |
| Pos. | Driver | (France) NOG | | (Portugal) POR | | (Germany) HOC | | (Italy) MIS | | (Belgium) SPA | | (France) MAG | | (Spain) BAR | | (France) LEC | | (Italy) MON | | Points |

| Colour | Result |
|---|---|
| Gold | Winner |
| Silver | Second place |
| Bronze | Third place |
| Green | Points classification |
| Blue | Non-points classification |
| Blue | Non-classified finish (NC) |
| Purple | Retired, not classified (Ret) |
| Red | Did not qualify (DNQ) |
| Red | Did not pre-qualify (DNPQ) |
| Black | Disqualified (DSQ) |
| White | Did not start (DNS) |
| White | Withdrew (WD) |
| White | Race cancelled (C) |
| Blank | Did not practice (DNP) |
| Blank | Did not arrive (DNA) |
| Blank | Excluded (EX) |

† – Drivers did not finish the race, but were classified as they completed 90% of the race distance.

==== Juniors Classification ====
| Pos. | Driver | (France) NOG | | (Portugal) POR | | (Germany) HOC | | (Italy) MIS | | (Belgium) SPA | | (France) MAG | | (Spain) BAR | | (France) LEC | | (Italy) MON | | Points |
|---|---|---|---|---|---|---|---|---|---|---|---|---|---|---|---|---|---|---|---|---|
| 1 | (Italy) Damiano Puccetti | 20 | 19 | 14 | 9 | 11 | 36 | 9 | 3 | 15 | 13 | 11 | 21 | 6 | 6 | 14 | 14 | 8 | 9 | 247 |
| 2 | (Italy) Leonardo Arduini | 12 | 15 | 12 | 13 | 7 | 11 | 12 | 32 | 13 | 11 | 10 | 6 | 14 | 14 | 12 | 15 | 6 | 11 | 246 |
| 3 | (Republic of Ireland) Jack Byrne | 9 | 4 | 11 | 10 | 9 | 15 | 30 | 15 | Ret | 8 | 13 | Ret | Ret | 9 | 36 | 20 | 4 | 15 | 196 |
| 4 | (Netherlands) Mauro Polderman | 17 | Ret | Ret | 20 | 15 | 37 | 16 | 25 | 11 | 9 | DSQ | 10 | 7 | 5 | 9 | 25 | Ret | 35 | 170 |
| 5 | (Serbia) Nikola Tošić | 29 | 28 | 17 | Ret | 19 | 14 | 22 | 19 | 25 | 22 | 15 | 14 | 25 | Ret | 22 | Ret | 17 | 23 | 126 |
| 6 | (Spain) Adrián Schimpf | 23 | 30 | 8 | 15 | 6 | 5 | DNS | 6 | | | DNS | Ret | | | | | | | 91 |
| 7 | (Spain) Alejandro Schimpf | 34 | Ret | 7 | 7 | Ret | 12 | 11 | 4 | | | | | | | | | | | 86 |
| 8 | (Belgium) Lucas Cartelle | | | | | | | | | 18 | 41† | 30 | Ret | 29 | 21 | | | | | 34 |
| 9 | (Republic of Ireland) Harry McGovern | | | | | | | | | 17 | 15 | 17 | Ret | | | | | | | 26 |
| Pos. | Driver | (France) NOG | | (Portugal) POR | | (Germany) HOC | | (Italy) MIS | | (Belgium) SPA | | (France) MAG | | (Spain) BAR | | (France) LEC | | (Italy) MON | | Points |

==== Challengers Classification ====
| Pos. | Driver | (France) NOG | | (Portugal) POR | | (Germany) HOC | | (Italy) MIS | | (Belgium) SPA | | (France) MAG | | (Spain) BAR | | (France) LEC | | (Italy) MON | | Points |
|---|---|---|---|---|---|---|---|---|---|---|---|---|---|---|---|---|---|---|---|---|
| 1 | (France) Guillaume Maio | 14 | 1 | 13 | 6 | 28 | 7 | Ret | 12 | 22 | 14 | 9 | 9 | 10 | 8 | 10 | 7 | 7 | 14 | 285 |
| 2 | (Netherlands) Lorenzo van Riet | 8 | 16 | 16 | 14 | 8 | 13 | 6 | 26 | 6 | 5 | 20 | 8 | 8 | 13 | 11 | 12 | 10 | 5 | 279 |
| 3 | (Serbia) Nikola Miljkovic | 22 | 24 | 10 | 8 | Ret | 16 | | | 9 | 4 | DSQ | 2 | 4 | 41 | 17 | 43† | 14 | 33 | 188 |
| 4 | (Italy) Ludovico Longoni | 15 | 23 | 15 | 11 | | | 15 | Ret | 30 | 16 | | | 18 | 23 | 26 | 19 | 9 | 22 | 146 |
| 5 | (France) Benjamin Cauvas | | | 19 | 21 | 16 | 21 | | | 40 | Ret | 19 | Ret | DSQ | 15 | 24 | 17 | | | 98 |
| 6 | (Serbia) Milan Popović | 31 | 29 | | | 34 | 38 | | | | | | | 42 | 47† | | | Ret | 36 | 48 |
| 7 | (Spain) Mariano Alonso | | | | | | | 19 | 30 | | | | | | | | | 19 | 19 | 44 |
Ineligible to score points
| — | (France) Loic Labeda | | | | | | | | | | | | | | | | | 26 | 18 | — |
| Pos. | Driver | (France) NOG | | (Portugal) POR | | (Germany) HOC | | (Italy) MIS | | (Belgium) SPA | | (France) MAG | | (Spain) BAR | | (France) LEC | | (Italy) MON | | Points |

==== Gentlemen Classification ====
| Pos. | Driver | (France) NOG | | (Portugal) POR | | (Germany) HOC | | (Italy) MIS | | (Belgium) SPA | | (France) MAG | | (Spain) BAR | | (France) LEC | | (Italy) MON | | Points |
|---|---|---|---|---|---|---|---|---|---|---|---|---|---|---|---|---|---|---|---|---|
| 1 | (France) Mickaël Carrée | 7 | 18 | 25 | 18 | 18 | 17 | 17 | 10 | 44 | 24 | 12 | 11 | 33 | 19 | 21 | 23 | 27 | 16 | 301 |
| 2 | (Netherlands) Stephan Polderman | 39† | 22 | 18 | 17 | 23 | 29 | 35 | 31 | 14 | 37 | 24 | 25 | 13 | 26 | 15 | 13 | 15 | 20 | 259 |
| 3 | (Italy) "Nava" | DNS | DNS | 26 | 24 | 29 | 31 | 38† | 23 | 32 | Ret | 31 | 23 | 32 | 25 | 23 | 35 | 11 | 17 | 180 |
| 4 | (France) Michel Faye | 36 | 25 | 29 | 28 | 31 | 30 | 33 | 28 | 38 | 36 | 34 | 26 | 36 | 39 | 32 | 36 | 28 | 31 | 165 |
| 5 | (France) "HORN" | 37† | 35† | | | 25 | 33 | 26 | DNS | 35 | DSQ | 25 | 27 | 23 | 28 | 38 | 28 | 22 | 26 | 143 |
| 6 | (Italy) Quinto Stefana | 21 | 27 | 20 | 19 | 36 | 24 | Ret | 24 | | | | | | | | | | | 82 |
| 7 | (Netherlands) René Steenmetz | 19 | Ret | Ret | DNS | | | | | 12 | DSQ | | | 16 | DSQ | | | 33 | 28 | 70 |
| 8 | (Spain) Gabriel Alonso | | | 32 | 30 | | | | | | | | | 46 | 40 | | | 34 | 34 | 33 |
| Pos. | Driver | (France) NOG | | (Portugal) POR | | (Germany) HOC | | (Italy) MIS | | (Belgium) SPA | | (France) MAG | | (Spain) BAR | | (France) LEC | | (Italy) MON | | Points |

==== Teams classification ====
| Pos. | Team | Points |
|---|---|---|
| 1 | (Italy) Rangoni Corse | 1459 |
| 2 | (France) GPA Racing | 1005 |
| 3 | (France) Milan Compétition | 763 |
| 4 | (Spain) AST Competition | 636 |
| 5 | (Italy) MC Motortecnica | 608 |
| 6 | (France) GM Sport | 483 |
| 7 | (Serbia) Tempo Racing | 268 |
| 8 | (France) T2CM | 253 |
| 9 | (Serbia) AKSK Crvena Zvezda | 176 |

=== Clio Cup France ===
| Pos. | Driver | (France) NOG | | (Portugal) POR | | (Germany) HOC | | (France) MAG | | (France) LEC | | Points |
|---|---|---|---|---|---|---|---|---|---|---|---|---|
| 1 | (Italy) Gabriele Torelli | 2 | 6 | 6 | 2 | 1 | 2 | 2 | 1 | 2 | 6 | 438 |
| 2 | (France) David Pouget | 3 | 20 | 3 | 26 | 3 | 1 | 3 | 3 | 4 | 1 | 372 |
| 3 | (France) Nicolas Milan | 5 | 2 | 1 | 4 | 4 | 3 | 8 | 15 | 5 | 3 | 367 |
| 4 | (France) Alexandre Finkelstein | 6 | 11 | 5 | 3 | 5 | 6 | 5 | Ret | 3 | 2 | 313 |
| 5 | (France) Florian Venturi | 4 | 3 | 9 | 5 | 12 | 9 | 6 | 5 | | | 267 |
| 6 | (France) Mickaël Carrée | 7 | 18 | 25 | 18 | 18 | 17 | 12 | 11 | 21 | 23 | 234 |
| 7 | (France) Thomas Compain | 10 | 7 | 30 | 12 | 14 | 10 | 23 | Ret | 19 | 10 | 222 |
| 8 | (France) Calvin Comte | 26 | 12 | 23 | 23 | 20 | 23 | 21 | 16 | 31 | 31 | 209 |
| 9 | (France) Samuel Chaligne | 30 | 33 | 27 | 25 | 24 | 28 | 35 | 20 | 37 | 37 | 155 |
| 10 | (France) Michel Faye | 36 | 25 | 29 | 28 | 31 | 30 | 34 | 26 | 32 | 36 | 142 |
| 11 | (France) Pierre Bredeaux | 25 | 8 | 4 | 29 | Ret | Ret | 7 | Ret | | | 117 |
| 12 | (France) Jean-Louis Carponcin | 28 | Ret | 28 | 27 | 35 | 34 | | | 42 | WD | 94 |
| 13 | (France) Alexandre Albouy | 16 | 17 | | | | | | | 7 | 9 | 92 |
| 14 | (France) Cédric Delcroix | Ret | 34† | 24 | 22 | 22 | 19 | | | | | 78 |
| 15 | (France) Kévin Jimenez | 11 | 5 | | | | | | | | | 58 |
| 16 | (Portugal) Manuel Fernandes | | | 22 | 16 | | | | | | | 51 |
| 17 | (France) Aurélien Renet | 13 | 10 | | | | | | | | | 44 |
| 18 | (France) Steve Compain | | | | | 27 | 25 | | | | | 36 |
| 19 | (France) Laurent Dziadus | 18 | 14 | | | | | | | | | 32 |
| 20 | (France) Florent Grizaud | 32 | 13 | | | | | | | | | 22 |
| 21 | (France) Romain Lavocat | 27 | 32 | | | | | | | | | 14 |
| 22 | (France) Yann-Maël Navillod | 40† | 21 | | | | | | | | | 8 |
| 23 | (France) Jérémy Bordagaray | 33 | Ret | | | | | | | | | 3 |
| 24 | (France) Alexandre Barcet | 38† | Ret | | | | | | | | | 1 |
Ineligible to score points
| — | (France) Rodrigues Dagnet | | | | | | | 28 | 18 | 44 | 26 | — |
| — | (France) Quentin Buret | | | | | | | | | 20 | 33 | — |
| — | (France) Maxime Guedou | | | | | | | 37 | 29 | | | — |
| — | (France) Nicolas Milan Jr. | | | | | | | 33 | 30 | 46† | 32 | — |
| — | (France) Stéphane Nevers | | | | | | | | | 34 | 38 | — |
| Pos. | Driver | (France) NOG | | (Portugal) POR | | (Germany) HOC | | (France) MAG | | (France) LEC | | Points |

| Colour | Result |
|---|---|
| Gold | Winner |
| Silver | Second place |
| Bronze | Third place |
| Green | Points classification |
| Blue | Non-points classification |
| Blue | Non-classified finish (NC) |
| Purple | Retired, not classified (Ret) |
| Red | Did not qualify (DNQ) |
| Red | Did not pre-qualify (DNPQ) |
| Black | Disqualified (DSQ) |
| White | Did not start (DNS) |
| White | Withdrew (WD) |
| White | Race cancelled (C) |
| Blank | Did not practice (DNP) |
| Blank | Did not arrive (DNA) |
| Blank | Excluded (EX) |

==== Juniors Classification ====
| Pos. | Driver | (France) NOG | | (Portugal) POR | | (Germany) HOC | | (France) MAG | | (France) LEC | | Points |
|---|---|---|---|---|---|---|---|---|---|---|---|---|
| 1 | (France) Florian Venturi | 4 | 3 | 9 | 5 | 12 | 9 | 6 | 5 | | | 155 |
| 2 | (France) Thomas Compain | 10 | 7 | 30 | 12 | 14 | 10 | 23 | Ret | 19 | 10 | 139 |
| 3 | (France) Pierre Bredeaux | 25 | 8 | 4 | 29 | Ret | Ret | 7 | Ret | | | 71 |
| 4 | (France) Alexandre Barcet | 38† | Ret | | | | | | | | | 20 |
Ineligible to score points
| — | (France) Nicolas Milan Jr. | | | | | | | 33 | 30 | 46† | 32 | — |
| Pos. | Driver | (France) NOG | | (Portugal) POR | | (Germany) HOC | | (France) MAG | | (France) LEC | | Points |

==== Challengers Classification ====
| Pos. | Driver | (France) NOG | | (Portugal) POR | | (Germany) HOC | | (France) MAG | | (France) LEC | | Points |
|---|---|---|---|---|---|---|---|---|---|---|---|---|
| 1 | (France) Calvin Comte | 26 | 12 | 23 | 23 | 20 | 23 | 21 | 16 | 31 | 31 | 154 |
| 2 | (France) Cédric Delcroix | Ret | 34† | 24 | 22 | 22 | 19 | | | | | 66 |
| 3 | (France) Alexandre Albouy | 16 | 17 | | | | | | | 7 | 9 | 60 |
| 4 | (Portugal) Manuel Fernandes | | | 22 | 16 | | | | | | | 40 |
| 5 | (France) Kévin Jimenez | 11 | 5 | | | | | | | | | 40 |
| 6 | (France) Aurélien Renet | 13 | 10 | | | | | | | | | 30 |
| 7 | (France) Florent Grizaud | 32 | 13 | | | | | | | | | 16 |
| 8 | (France) Romain Lavocat | 27 | 32 | | | | | | | | | 14 |
| 9 | (France) Jérémy Bordagaray | 33 | Ret | | | | | | | | | 4 |
Ineligible to score points
| — | (France) Quentin Buret | | | | | | | | | 20 | 33 | — |
| — | (France) Maxime Guedou | | | | | | | 37 | 29 | | | — |
| Pos. | Driver | (France) NOG | | (Portugal) POR | | (Germany) HOC | | (France) MAG | | (France) LEC | | Points |

==== Gentlemen Classification ====
| Pos. | Driver | (France) NOG | | (Portugal) POR | | (Germany) HOC | | (France) MAG | | (France) LEC | | Points |
|---|---|---|---|---|---|---|---|---|---|---|---|---|
| 1 | (France) Mickaël Carrée | 7 | 18 | 25 | 18 | 18 | 17 | 12 | 11 | 21 | 23 | 195 |
| 2 | (France) Samuel Chaligne | 30 | 33 | 27 | 25 | 24 | 28 | 35 | 20 | 37 | 37 | 126 |
| 3 | (France) Michel Faye | 36 | 25 | 29 | 28 | 31 | 30 | 34 | 26 | 32 | 36 | 115 |
| 4 | (France) Jean-Louis Carponcin | 28 | Ret | 28 | 27 | 35 | 34 | | | 42 | WD | 62 |
| 5 | (France) Laurent Dziadus | 18 | 14 | | | | | | | | | 35 |
| 6 | (France) Steve Compain | | | | | 27 | 25 | | | | | 27 |
| 7 | (France) Yann-Maël Navillod | 40† | 21 | | | | | | | | | 18 |
Ineligible to score points
| — | (France) Rodrigues Dagnet | | | | | | | 28 | 18 | 44 | 26 | — |
| — | (France) Stéphane Nevers | | | | | | | | | 34 | 38 | — |
| Pos. | Driver | (France) NOG | | (Portugal) POR | | (Germany) HOC | | (France) MAG | | (France) LEC | | Points |

=== Clio Cup España ===
| Pos. | Driver | (France) NOG | | (Portugal) POR | | (Italy) MIS | | (Belgium) SPA | | (Spain) BAR | | Points |
|---|---|---|---|---|---|---|---|---|---|---|---|---|
| 1 | (Italy) Damiano Puccetti | 20 | 19 | 14 | 9 | 9 | 3 | 15 | 13 | 6 | 6 | 468 |
| 2 | (France) Gaël Rostant | 24 | 26 | 31 | 31 | | | 41 | 33 | 47 | 33 | 279 |
| 3 | (France) Samuel Chaligne | 30 | 33 | 27 | 25 | 24 | 16 | DNQ | DNQ | 37 | 30 | 279 |
| 4 | (Italy) Andrea Chierichetti | 35 | 31 | 21 | Ret | 23 | Ret | 36 | 35 | 39 | 35 | 273 |
| 5 | (Spain) Alejandro Schimpf | 34 | Ret | 7 | 7 | 11 | 4 | | | | | 214 |
| 6 | (Netherlands) René Steenmetz | 19 | Ret | Ret | DNS | | | 12 | DSQ | 16 | DSQ | 142 |
| Pos. | Driver | (France) NOG | | (Portugal) POR | | (Italy) MIS | | (Belgium) SPA | | (Spain) BAR | | Points |

==== Gentlemen Classification ====
| Pos. | Driver | (France) NOG | | (Portugal) POR | | (Italy) MIS | | (Belgium) SPA | | (Spain) BAR | | Points |
|---|---|---|---|---|---|---|---|---|---|---|---|---|
| 1 | (France) Samuel Chaligne | 30 | 33 | 27 | 25 | 24 | 16 | DNQ | DNQ | 37 | 30 | 129 |
| 2 | (France) Gaël Rostant | 24 | 26 | 31 | 31 | | | 41 | 33 | 47 | 33 | 119 |
| 3 | (Italy) Andrea Chierichetti | 35 | 31 | 21 | Ret | 23 | Ret | 36 | 35 | 39 | 35 | 119 |
| 4 | (Netherlands) René Steenmetz | 19 | Ret | Ret | DNS | | | 12 | DSQ | 16 | DSQ | 60 |
| Pos. | Driver | (France) NOG | | (Portugal) POR | | (Italy) MIS | | (Belgium) SPA | | (Spain) BAR | | Points |

=== Clio Cup Italia ===
| Pos. | Driver | (Italy) MIS | | (Belgium) SPA | | (Spain) BAR | | (France) LEC | | (Italy) MON | | Points |
|---|---|---|---|---|---|---|---|---|---|---|---|---|
| 1 | (France) Anthony Jurado | 3 | 37† | 5 | 40 | 5 | 2 | 1 | 4 | 5 | 2 | 387 |
| 2 | (Italy) Alex Lancellotti | 5 | Ret | 4 | 7 | 27 | 12 | 6 | 5 | 2 | 6 | 367 |
| 3 | (Italy) Giacomo Trebbi | 8 | 9 | 8 | 12 | 12 | 10 | 13 | 18 | Ret | 8 | 309 |
| 4 | (Italy) Leonardo Arduini | 12 | 32 | 13 | 11 | 14 | 14 | 12 | 15 | 6 | 11 | 295 |
| 5 | (Italy) Cristian Ricciarini | 10 | 5 | 19 | 23 | 15 | 16 | 40 | WD | 13 | 10 | 253 |
| 6 | (Italy) Ludovico Longoni | 15 | Ret | 30 | 16 | 18 | 23 | 26 | 19 | 9 | 22 | 212 |
| 7 | (Netherlands) Stephan Polderman | 35 | 31 | 14 | 37 | 13 | 26 | 15 | 13 | 15 | 20 | 198 |
| 8 | (Italy) Ronnie Stefani | 21 | DNS | 26 | 21 | 11 | 11 | Ret | DNS | 18 | 12 | 178 |
| 9 | (Italy) Mattia Lancellotti | 7 | 7 | 10 | DNS | | | | | 20 | 7 | 161 |
| 10 | (Egypt) Youssef Gaber | 27 | 21 | 28 | 25 | 41 | 22 | 30 | 29 | 30 | 24 | 147 |
| 11 | (France) David Pajot | 37 | 17 | 21 | 20 | 21 | 29 | Ret | 27 | | | 125 |
| 12 | (France) "HORN" | 26 | DNS | 35 | DSQ | 23 | 28 | 38 | 28 | 22 | 26 | 120 |
| 13 | (Mexico) Eduardo Miranda | 20 | 14 | 23 | 18 | 28 | 46† | | | | | 102 |
| 14 | (Turkey) Emir Saraç | 29 | Ret | 34 | 26 | 38 | 36 | 39 | Ret | 25 | 21 | 93 |
| 15 | (Italy) Adam Sascha | 18 | 22 | 45 | 31 | 20 | 18 | | | | | 91 |
| 16 | (Italy) Sandro Cutini | 39† | 20 | 31 | 28 | 30 | 45 | | | 24 | 25 | 83 |
| 17 | (Italy) Gianalberto Coldani | 14 | 13 | | | | | | | 12 | Ret | 79 |
| 18 | (Italy) Rolando Bordacchini | 31 | 29 | 43 | 34 | 45 | 42 | 41 | 40 | 32 | Ret | 62 |
| 19 | (Belgium) Lucas Cartelle | | | 18 | 41† | 29 | 21 | | | | | 60 |
| 20 | (Italy) Andrea Chierichetti | 23 | Ret | 36 | 35 | 39 | 35 | | | 23 | 29 | 58 |
| 21 | (Spain) Jordi Palomeras Ventós | 13 | 8 | | | | | | | | | 57 |
| 22 | (Spain) Adrián Schimpf | DNS | 6 | | | | | | | | | 42 |
| 23 | (Italy) Andrea Cordini | 28 | 27 | | | | | | | 29 | 32 | 30 |
| 24 | (Italy) Sebastian Gavazza | 34 | 36† | 39 | Ret | DNS | 31 | | | 31 | 27 | 29 |
| 25 | (Italy) Davide Rosini | Ret | 18 | | | | | | | | | 20 |
| 26 | (Costa Rica) Aldo Vincenti Castillo | 32 | 34 | 46 | 32 | 40 | 44 | | | | | 19 |
| 27 | (Slovenia) Fabijan Miha | 36 | 33 | Ret | 29 | | | | | | | 17 |
| 28 | (Italy) Quinto Stefana | Ret | 24 | | | | | | | | | 12 |
| 29 | (Italy) Manuel Stefani | Ret | 35 | | | 44 | 34 | | | | | 11 |
| 30 | (Italy) Luca Gresini | 25 | DSQ | | | | | | | | | 10 |
Ineligible to score points
| — | (Italy) Francesco Pagano | | | | | | | | | 16 | 13 | — |
| — | (United Kingdom) Ben Jenkins | | | | | | | | | 21 | 30 | — |
| — | (India) Rahil Taneja | | | | | | | 43 | 39 | | | — |
| Pos. | Driver | (Italy) MIS | | (Belgium) SPA | | (Spain) BAR | | (France) LEC | | (Italy) MON | | Points |

==== Juniors Classification ====
| Pos. | Driver | (Italy) MIS | | (Belgium) SPA | | (Spain) BAR | | (France) LEC | | (Italy) MON | | Points |
|---|---|---|---|---|---|---|---|---|---|---|---|---|
| 1 | (Italy) Leonardo Arduini | 12 | 32 | 13 | 11 | 14 | 14 | 12 | 15 | 6 | 11 | 180 |
| 2 | (Italy) Ronnie Stefani | 21 | DNS | 26 | 21 | 11 | 11 | Ret | DNS | 18 | 12 | 102 |
| 3 | (Italy) Adam Sascha | 18 | 22 | 45 | 31 | 20 | 18 | | | | | 67 |
| 4 | (Mexico) Eduardo Miranda | 20 | 14 | 23 | 18 | 28 | 46† | | | | | 64 |
| 5 | (Italy) Sebastian Gavazza | 34 | 36† | 39 | Ret | DNS | 31 | | | 31 | 27 | 56 |
| 6 | (Belgium) Lucas Cartelle | | | 18 | 41† | 29 | 21 | | | | | 41 |
| 7 | (Spain) Adrián Schimpf | DNS | 6 | | | | | | | | | 20 |
Ineligible to score points
| — | (Italy) Francesco Pagano | | | | | | | | | 16 | 13 | — |
| Pos. | Driver | (Italy) MIS | | (Belgium) SPA | | (Spain) BAR | | (France) LEC | | (Italy) MON | | Points |

==== Challengers Classification ====
| Pos. | Driver | (Italy) MIS | | (Belgium) SPA | | (Spain) BAR | | (France) LEC | | (Italy) MON | | Points |
|---|---|---|---|---|---|---|---|---|---|---|---|---|
| 1 | (Italy) Alex Lancellotti | 5 | Ret | 4 | 7 | 27 | 12 | 6 | 5 | 2 | 6 | 167 |
| 2 | (Italy) Giacomo Trebbi | 8 | 9 | 8 | 12 | 12 | 10 | 13 | 18 | Ret | 8 | 136 |
| 3 | (Italy) Ludovico Longoni | 15 | Ret | 30 | 16 | 18 | 23 | 26 | 19 | 9 | 22 | 98 |
| 4 | (Egypt) Youssef Gaber | 27 | 21 | 28 | 25 | 41 | 22 | 30 | 29 | 30 | 24 | 77 |
| 5 | (Italy) Mattia Lancellotti | 7 | 7 | 10 | DNS | | | | | 20 | 7 | 72 |
| 6 | (Turkey) Emir Saraç | 29 | Ret | 34 | 26 | 38 | 36 | 39 | Ret | 25 | 21 | 56 |
| 7 | (Italy) Sandro Cutini | 39† | 20 | 31 | 28 | 30 | 45 | | | 24 | 25 | 47 |
| 8 | (Italy) Gianalberto Coldani | 14 | 13 | | | | | | | 12 | Ret | 30 |
| 9 | (Spain) Jordi Palomeras Ventós | 13 | 8 | | | | | | | | | 25 |
| 10 | (Costa Rica) Aldo Vincenti Castillo | 32 | 34 | 46 | 32 | 40 | 44 | | | | | 21 |
| 11 | (Italy) Davide Rosini | Ret | 18 | | | | | | | | | 8 |
| 12 | (Slovenia) Fabijan Miha | 36 | 33 | Ret | 29 | | | | | | | 8 |
| 13 | (Italy) Luca Gresini | 25 | DSQ | | | | | | | | | 4 |
| Pos. | Driver | (Italy) MIS | | (Belgium) SPA | | (Spain) BAR | | (France) LEC | | (Italy) MON | | Points |

==== Gentlemen Classification ====
| Pos. | Driver | (Italy) MIS | | (Belgium) SPA | | (Spain) BAR | | (France) LEC | | (Italy) MON | | Points |
|---|---|---|---|---|---|---|---|---|---|---|---|---|
| 1 | (Italy) Cristian Ricciarini | 10 | 5 | 19 | 23 | 15 | 16 | 40 | WD | 13 | 10 | 157 |
| 2 | (Netherlands) Stephan Polderman | 35 | 31 | 14 | 37 | 13 | 26 | 15 | 13 | 15 | 20 | 145 |
| 3 | (France) "HORN" | 26 | DNS | 35 | DSQ | 23 | 28 | 38 | 28 | 22 | 26 | 95 |
| 4 | (France) David Pajot | 37 | 17 | 21 | 20 | 21 | 29 | Ret | 27 | | | 89 |
| 5 | (Italy) Rolando Bordacchini | 31 | 29 | 43 | 34 | 45 | 42 | 41 | 40 | 32 | Ret | 70 |
| 6 | (Italy) Andrea Chierichetti | 23 | Ret | 36 | 35 | 39 | 35 | | | 23 | 29 | 67 |
| 7 | (Italy) Andrea Cordini | 28 | 27 | | | | | | | 29 | 32 | 36 |
| 8 | (Italy) Manuel Stefani | Ret | 35 | | | 44 | 34 | | | | | 18 |
| 9 | (Italy) Quinto Stefana | Ret | 24 | | | | | | | | | 12 |
Ineligible to score points
| — | (India) Rahil Taneja | | | | | | | 43 | 39 | | | — |
| Pos. | Driver | (Italy) MIS | | (Belgium) SPA | | (Spain) BAR | | (France) LEC | | (Italy) MON | | Points |

=== Clio Cup Mid-Europe ===
| Pos. | Driver | (Germany) HOC | | (Belgium) SPA | | (France) MAG | | (Spain) BAR | | (France) LEC | | Points |
|---|---|---|---|---|---|---|---|---|---|---|---|---|
| 1 | (Netherlands) Lorenzo van Riet | 8 | 13 | 6 | 5 | 20 | 8 | 8 | 13 | 11 | 12 | 360 |
| 2 | (France) Guillaume Maio | 28 | 7 | 22 | 14 | 9 | 9 | 10 | 8 | 10 | 7 | 339 |
| 3 | (France) Aurélien Renet | Ret | 18 | Ret | 6 | 4 | 7 | 9 | Ret | 8 | 8 | 275 |
| 4 | (Netherlands) Mauro Polderman | 15 | 37 | 11 | 9 | DSQ | 10 | 7 | 5 | 9 | 25 | 274 |
| 5 | (France) Thomas Compain | 14 | 10 | 7 | 10 | 23 | Ret | 22 | 7 | 19 | 10 | 273 |
| 6 | (Serbia) Nikola Miljkovic | Ret | 16 | 9 | 4 | DSQ | 2 | 4 | 41 | 17 | 43† | 253 |
| 7 | (Switzerland) Andreas Stucki | 13 | 8 | Ret | DNS | 16 | 13 | 19 | 17 | 18 | 11 | 231 |
| 8 | (Norway) Knut Eirik Knudsen | 17 | 26 | 27 | 42† | 14 | 12 | 17 | Ret | 16 | 21 | 199 |
| 9 | (Republic of Ireland) Jack Byrne | 9 | 15 | Ret | 8 | 13 | Ret | Ret | 9 | 36 | 20 | 197 |
| 10 | (Serbia) Nikola Tošić | 19 | 14 | 25 | 22 | 15 | 14 | 25 | Ret | 22 | Ret | 178 |
| 11 | (Norway) Felix Heiberg | 30 | 27 | 24 | 19 | 18 | 22 | 31 | 24 | 25 | 22 | 174 |
| 12 | (Czech Republic) Jaroslav Honzik | 26 | 20 | 20 | Ret | 27 | Ret | 24 | 20 | 28 | 16 | 162 |
| 13 | (France) Benjamin Cauvas | 16 | 21 | 40 | Ret | 19 | Ret | DSQ | 15 | 24 | 17 | 143 |
| 14 | (Switzerland) Daniel Nyffeler | 21 | 22 | 29 | Ret | 26 | 24 | 26 | 27 | 35 | 30 | 130 |
| 15 | (France) Romain Lavocat | 33 | 32 | 37 | 30 | 32 | 28 | 35 | 37 | 27 | 24 | 122 |
| 16 | (Denmark) Mathias Dall | 10 | Ret | 16 | 17 | | | | | | | 88 |
| 17 | (France) Rémi Belleville | 32 | 35 | 42 | 38 | Ret | 32 | 43 | 38 | 33 | 42 | 84 |
| 18 | (France) Sébastien Gehin | | | 33 | 27 | 29 | 19 | | | 29 | 34 | 78 |
| 19 | (Germany) Udo Brunner | 37 | 39 | 47 | 39 | 36 | 31 | 48 | 43 | 45 | 41 | 71 |
| 20 | (France) Laurent Dziadus | 38† | DNS | Ret | Ret | 22 | 17 | | | | | 42 |
| Pos. | Driver | (Germany) HOC | | (Belgium) SPA | | (France) MAG | | (Spain) BAR | | (France) LEC | | Points |

==== Juniors Classification ====
| Pos. | Driver | (Germany) HOC | | (Belgium) SPA | | (France) MAG | | (Spain) BAR | | (France) LEC | | Points |
|---|---|---|---|---|---|---|---|---|---|---|---|---|
| 1 | (Netherlands) Mauro Polderman | 15 | 37 | 11 | 9 | DSQ | 10 | 7 | 5 | 9 | 25 | 140 |
| 2 | (France) Thomas Compain | 14 | 10 | 7 | 10 | 23 | Ret | 22 | 7 | 19 | 10 | 139 |
| 3 | (Republic of Ireland) Jack Byrne | 9 | 15 | Ret | 8 | 13 | Ret | Ret | 9 | 36 | 20 | 107 |
| 4 | (Norway) Felix Heiberg | 30 | 27 | 24 | 19 | 18 | 22 | 31 | 24 | 25 | 22 | 98 |
| 5 | (Serbia) Nikola Tošić | 19 | 14 | 25 | 22 | 15 | 14 | 25 | Ret | 22 | Ret | 91 |
| 6 | (Denmark) Mathias Dall | 10 | Ret | 16 | 17 | | | | | | | 37 |
| Pos. | Driver | (Germany) HOC | | (Belgium) SPA | | (France) MAG | | (Spain) BAR | | (France) LEC | | Points |

==== Challengers Classification ====
| Pos. | Driver | (Germany) HOC | | (Belgium) SPA | | (France) MAG | | (Spain) BAR | | (France) LEC | | Points |
|---|---|---|---|---|---|---|---|---|---|---|---|---|
| 1 | (Netherlands) Lorenzo van Riet | 8 | 13 | 6 | 5 | 20 | 8 | 8 | 13 | 11 | 12 | 137 |
| 2 | (France) Guillaume Maio | 28 | 7 | 22 | 14 | 9 | 9 | 10 | 8 | 10 | 7 | 134 |
| 3 | (France) Aurélien Renet | Ret | 18 | Ret | 6 | 4 | 7 | 9 | Ret | 8 | 8 | 102 |
| 4 | (Serbia) Nikola Miljkovic | Ret | 16 | 9 | 4 | DSQ | 2 | 4 | 41 | 17 | 43† | 96 |
| 5 | (Switzerland) Andreas Stucki | 13 | 8 | Ret | DNS | 16 | 13 | 19 | 17 | 18 | 11 | 80 |
| 6 | (Norway) Knut Eirik Knudsen | 17 | 26 | 27 | 42† | 14 | 12 | 17 | Ret | 16 | 21 | 66 |
| 7 | (Czech Republic) Jaroslav Honzik | 26 | 20 | 20 | Ret | 27 | Ret | 24 | 20 | 28 | 16 | 50 |
| 8 | (France) Benjamin Cauvas | 16 | 21 | 40 | Ret | 19 | Ret | DSQ | 15 | 24 | 17 | 49 |
| 9 | (Switzerland) Daniel Nyffeler | 21 | 22 | 29 | Ret | 26 | 24 | 26 | 27 | 35 | 30 | 37 |
| 10 | (France) Romain Lavocat | 33 | 32 | 37 | 30 | 32 | 28 | 35 | 37 | 27 | 24 | 32 |
| 11 | (France) Rémi Belleville | 32 | 35 | 42 | 38 | Ret | 32 | 43 | 38 | 33 | 42 | 19 |
| Pos. | Driver | (Germany) HOC | | (Belgium) SPA | | (France) MAG | | (Spain) BAR | | (France) LEC | | Points |
