= Williams FW11 =

Formula One racing car

Williams FW11 Williams FW11B
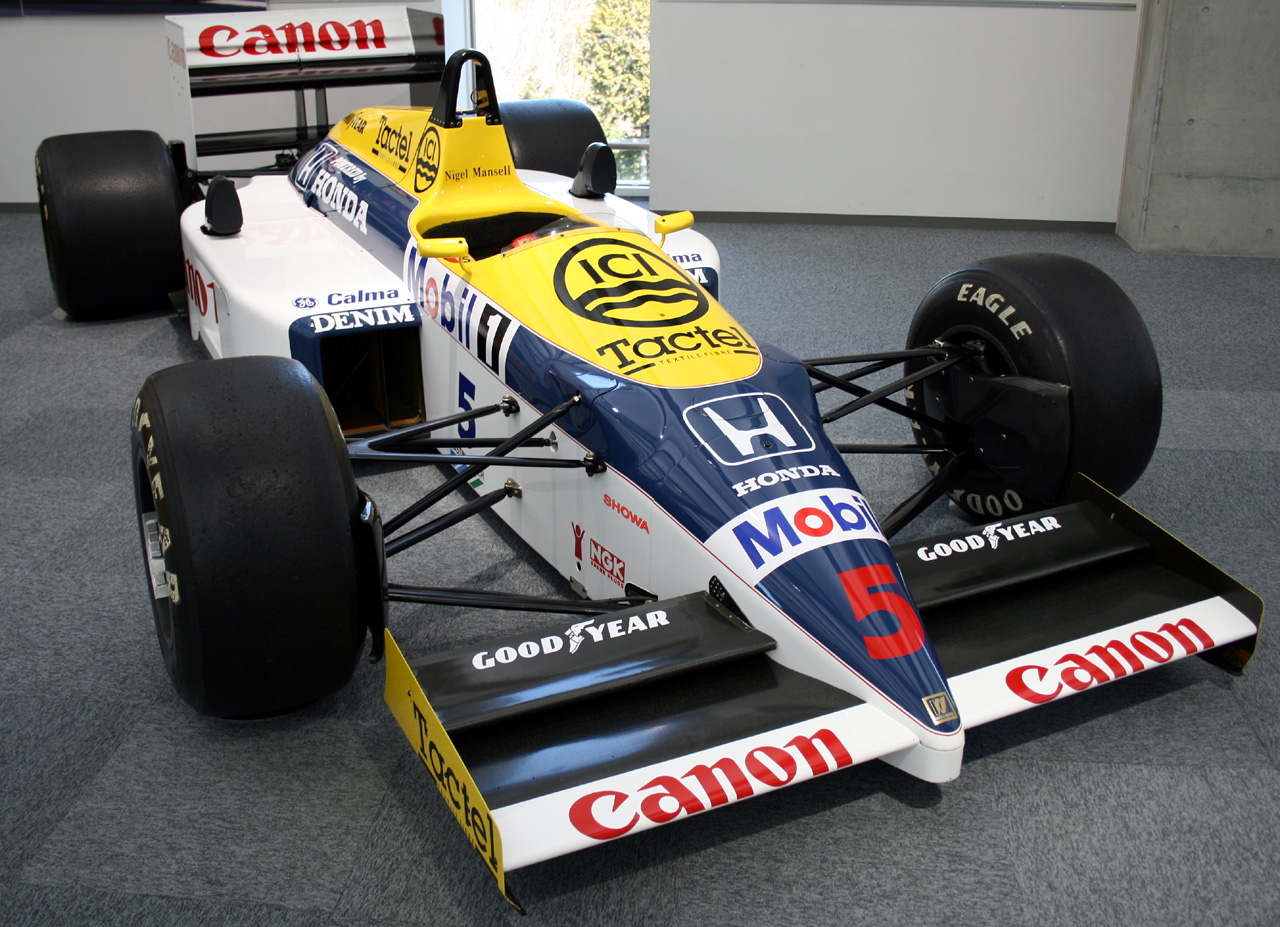
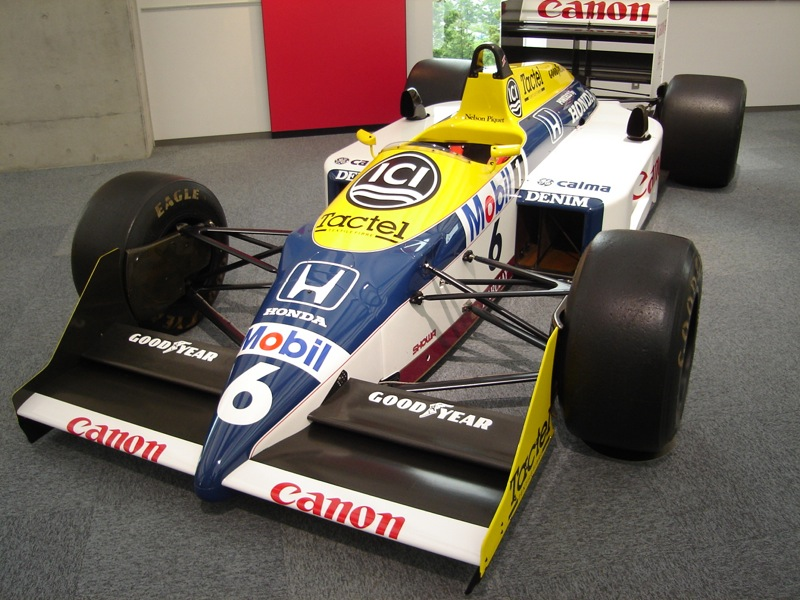
- Nigel Mansell's Williams FW11 (1986). Nelson Piquet's Williams FW11B (1987).
- Category: Formula One
- Constructor: Williams (chassis); Honda (engine)
- Designers: Patrick Head (Technical Director); Sergio Rinland (Chief Engineer); Frank Dernie (Head of Aerodynamics); Osamu Goto (Engine Technical Director (Honda))
- Predecessor: FW10
- Successor: FW12

Technical specifications
- Chassis: Moulded carbon composite monocoque
- Suspension (front): 1986-1987: double wishbones, pushrods 1987: active suspension
- Suspension (rear): 1986-1987: double wishbones, pullrods 1987: active suspension
- Axle track: Front: 1986: 1,803 mm (71.0 in); 1987: 1,778 mm (70.0 in); Rear: 1986: 1,651 mm (65.0 in); 1987: 1,625 mm (64.0 in)
- Wheelbase: 1986: 2,794 mm (110.0 in); 1987: 2,845 mm (112.0 in)
- Engine: 1986: Honda RA166E; 1987: Honda RA167E, 4.0 bar limited (1987 only), 1.5 L (1,494 cc, 91.2 cu in) V6 turbocharged
- Transmission: Williams / Hewland 6-speed manual
- Power: 800-1,000 hp @ 11,000 rpm (race-spec), 1,200+ hp @ 12,000 rpm (qualifying-spec)
- Weight: 540 kg (1,190 lb)
- Fuel: Mobil
- Tyres: Goodyear

Competition history
- Notable entrants: Canon Williams Honda Team
- Notable drivers: 5. (United Kingdom) Nigel Mansell; 6. (Brazil) Nelson Piquet; 5. (Italy) Riccardo Patrese
- Debut: 1986 Brazilian Grand Prix
- First win: 1986 Brazilian Grand Prix
- Last win: 1987 Mexican Grand Prix
- Last event: 1987 Australian Grand Prix
Races	Wins	Poles	F/Laps
32	18	16	17
- Constructors' Championships: 2 (1986, 1987)
- Drivers' Championships: 1 (1987, Nelson Piquet)

The Williams FW11 is a Formula One car designed by Frank Dernie for the Williams team. The original FW11 was used in the 1986 Formula One World Championship while an updated version, the FW11B, was used in the 1987 Championship. In both years, the car was powered by a Honda 1.5-litre turbocharged V6 engine, and driven by Briton Nigel Mansell and Brazilian Nelson Piquet.

The original FW11 won nine races of the 1986 Championship, with both Mansell and Piquet challenging for the Drivers' title before dramatically losing out to Alain Prost in his McLaren in the final race of the season in Australia. The FW11B won nine races of the 1987 Championship, and Piquet won the Drivers' title despite winning fewer races than Mansell. In both years, Williams comfortably won the Constructors' title.

The FW11B was the last Williams car with a turbocharged engine until the FW36 in 2014.

== History ==
=== 1986 ===
In 1986, the car won first time out in Brazil with Piquet, before Mansell laid down a title challenge with four wins. Williams were shaken by the near fatal road crash of Frank Williams which demoralised the team. Williams survived the crash but became a quadriplegic as a result, with the 1986 British Grand Prix the first time during the season he would appear in the Williams pits as he went through his rehabilitation. Patrick Head stepped up and managed the team until Williams returned late in the season. This may have caused the in-fighting between the two team mates, and the lost points helped Alain Prost take his second world championship. That and Mansell's spectacular blow out in the final race in Australia where all he had to do was finish third to win the title. The points built up between Piquet and Mansell were enough for Williams to take the constructors' championship, however.

Reportedly, both Nelson Piquet and Honda, whom it was rumored were paying the bulk of the Brazilian's US$3.3 million retainer, left Australia angry with Head and Williams Management. Both believed that the 1981 and 1983 World Champion had been signed by Frank Williams as the undisputed number 1 driver and that the team hadn't honoured their contract, with Frank Williams' comment when he announced the signing of Piquet that he had just signed "The best driver in the world" seeming to support their view. Both Piquet and Honda believed that Williams should have reined in Mansell during races and forced him to give best to Piquet for race wins or higher points finishes, and thus an easier passage to the World Championship, something that both Piquet and Honda coveted.

=== 1987 ===
The FW11 was updated slightly for 1987 to become the FW11B, and the team made no mistakes in wrapping up both championships. Honda were now supplying Lotus with the same engine supplied to Williams (though Lotus used the 1986 RA166E engine rather than the RA167E 1987 engine used by Williams), which helped Ayrton Senna challenge consistently, but the FW11's superiority told, and Piquet finished in the points (mostly on the podium) in every race other than San Marino (where he had a terrible crash at Tamburello during Friday practice, and he emerged with only a sore ankle, and he wanted to start the race but was prevented from doing so by F1 Medical boss, Prof. Sid Watkins who told him "You have a concussion, you can't race"), Belgium, and Australia, and he was champion. As for Mansell, he scored six victories including a memorable come from behind win at the British Grand Prix at Silverstone, passing Piquet for the lead with just 3 laps remaining. He scored twice as many wins as Piquet, but also had the lion's share of bad luck and unreliability. Piquet's third championship was assured after Mansell had a major crash during practice for the Japanese Grand Prix.

The team tested and developed its own active suspension for the first time with the FW11B, specifically through Piquet and chief designer Frank Dernie, after Mansell declared no confidence in the system having experienced a different version of it on the Lotus 92 in 1983 which led him to being disillusioned with the system. After much testing Piquet found the car to be superior to the conventionally suspended FW11B. The new suspension was an active suspension system similar to the one Lotus had been using all season on the Lotus 99T, but was renamed as Williams Reactive Ride due to the Lotus team having copyright on the 'Active Suspension' name for the system. The Williams engineered suspension was also lighter, less complicated and drew much less power from the Honda engine than did the Lotus example. The first time a hydraulic variant of the system was tested Dernie fitted it to a 1984 FW09, and during testing Piquet noted that although the car rode very smoothly, it handled very badly. So Dernie redesigned the system and hired Paddy Lowe and Steve Wise to design an electronic computerized system. In a race simulation test at the Imola circuit, driving a reactive suspension FW11B, Piquet completed 59 laps some 3 minutes faster than Mansell had done to win the Grand Prix at the circuit earlier in the year, though it was noted that he was also the only car on the circuit for the simulation and thus wasn't slowed by having to lap other cars. Still, his confidence in the new suspension was absolute and he first used it in competition at the Italian Grand Prix at Monza where it proved much faster than the passive suspension FW11B, allowing him to run with less wing and record the highest speed of the 1987 season when he was speed trapped at 218.807 mph (352.135 km/h), some 5 mph faster than Mansell could manage in the conventional suspension car. Piquet would start from the pole and win the race from the Lotus of Ayrton Senna, with Mansell unable to keep pace finishing 3rd. It took until the next race in Portugal before Mansell would try the reactive car during a Grand Prix weekend. There were also plans in 1987 to introduce a semi automatic transmission, but this never came to pass.

The FW11 was not a technical showcase by any means, but solid engineering, exceptional aerodynamics, the engine's outright power and superior fuel economy (even better than the TAG-Porsche engines used by McLaren), and Piquet and Mansell helped the car take 18 wins, 16 pole positions and 278 points over two seasons of racing.

The FW11B was the last Williams to race with a Honda engine, the Japanese company announcing during the season that they were moving to McLaren from 1988, despite a year left to run in the contract with Williams. It was believed there were two main reasons for this. Honda were unhappy with Williams management for allegedly not honoring the number 1 status contract of 'their' driver Nelson Piquet. Honda (and Piquet) believed that Williams should have ordered Nigel Mansell to give way to Piquet during races, and that their failure to do so cost Piquet the 1986 Drivers' Championship, and almost cost him the 1987 championship (though had Piquet not won in 1987, Mansell still would have given the Japanese company its first Drivers' Championship). While Mansell would stay with Williams for 1988, Piquet had announced during practice for the Hungarian Grand Prix that he would be moving to Lotus in 1988 as their undisputed number 1 driver, thus also staying with Honda. The second rumored reason why Honda left Williams a year before the contract ended was the team's refusal to dump Nigel Mansell from the driver line up and replace him with Satoru Nakajima in 1986 (Nakajima made his F1 debut with Lotus in 1987). Team owner Frank Williams, always more interested in the Constructors Championship which saw the team as the champions, preferred to keep the experienced Mansell, not only as he was a proven race winner having won his first two Grands Prix near the end of 1985, but he was more likely to score valuable points for the team. Williams was proven correct as Nakajima would race 5 full seasons in F1 with Lotus (1987-1989) and Tyrrell (1990-1991) and would only score a total of 16 points from 74 starts, with a best race finish of two 4th places. Another reason Mansell was retained was that he was under contract with the team until the end of 1988.

An interim car that was tested before the FW11's successor FW12 was finished, the FW11C was used for the Judd V8 engine powering the FW12 in 1988. It was only built for testing purposes and it never raced.

== Other ==
Mansell's FW11 was featured in the Japanese and American versions of the 2001 game Gran Turismo 3 under the alias F686/M. It was the most powerful Formula One car in the game, producing 939 PS (926 hp) (with an oil change it has 973 hp). It was also featured in the game Formula One 05 as an unlockable car. Piquet's FW11B was featured in the game Toca Race Driver 3.

== Complete Formula One results ==
(key) (results shown in bold indicate pole position; results in italics indicate fastest lap)

Year	Entrant	Chassis	Engine	Tyres	Driver	1	2	3	4	5	6	7	8	9	10	11	12	13	14	15	16	Pts.	WCC
1986	Canon Williams Honda Team	FW11	Honda RA166E; V6 tc	G		BRA	ESP	SMR	MON	BEL	CAN	DET	FRA	GBR	GER	HUN	AUT	ITA	POR	MEX	AUS	141	1st
1986	Canon Williams Honda Team	FW11	Honda RA166E; V6 tc	G	Nigel Mansell	Ret	2	Ret	4	1	**1**	5	1	1	3	3	Ret	2	1	5	**Ret**	141	1st
1986	Canon Williams Honda Team	FW11	Honda RA166E; V6 tc	G	Nelson Piquet	1	Ret	2	7	**Ret**	3	Ret	3	**2**	1	1	Ret	1	3	4	2	141	1st
1987	Canon Williams Honda Team	FW11B	Honda RA167E; V6 tc	G		BRA	SMR	BEL	MON	DET	FRA	GBR	GER	HUN	AUT	ITA	POR	ESP	MEX	JPN	AUS	137	1st
1987	Canon Williams Honda Team	FW11B	Honda RA167E; V6 tc	G	Nigel Mansell	**6**	1	**Ret**	**Ret**	**5**	**1**	1	**Ret**	**14**	1	3	Ret	1	**1**	DNS		137	1st
1987	Canon Williams Honda Team	FW11B	Honda RA167E; V6 tc	G	Nelson Piquet	2	DNS	Ret	2	2	2	**2**	1	1	**2**	**1**	3	**4**	2	15	Ret	137	1st
1987	Canon Williams Honda Team	FW11B	Honda RA167E; V6 tc	G	Riccardo Patrese																9	137	1st

== Sponsors ==
Brand	Country	Placed on
Canon	Japan	Sidepods, nose, front wing, rear wing
Tactel	United States	Fin, nose, front wing end plate
Calma	United States	Sidepods
Denim	Italy	Sidepods
ICI	United Kingdom	Fin, nose
Save The Children	United Kingdom	Side
Mobil 1	United States	Sides, nose

Awards
Preceded by Williams FW10B	Autosport; Racing Car Of The Year; 1986	Succeeded by Jaguar XJR-8
