= Lotus 98T =

Formula One racing car

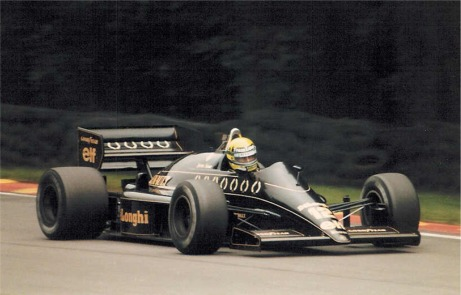
- Category: Formula One
- Constructor: Lotus
- Designers: Gérard Ducarouge (Technical Director); Martin Ogilvie (Chief Designer); Mike Coughlan (Assistant Chief Designer); John Davis (Head of Aerodynamics and R&D); Bernard Dudot (Chief Engine Designer (Renault))
- Predecessor: 97T
- Successor: 99T

Technical specifications
- Chassis: Carbon fibre and Kevlar Aluminium honeycomb monocoque
- Suspension (front): Double wishbones, pull-rod actuated coil springs over dampers, anti-roll bar
- Suspension (rear): Double wishbones, pull-rod actuated coil springs over dampers, anti-roll bar
- Axle track: Front: 1,816 mm (71.5 in); Rear: 1,620 mm (64 in)
- Wheelbase: 2,720 mm (107 in)
- Engine: Renault Gordini EF15B, 1,492 cc (91.0 cu in), 90° V6, turbo, mid-engine, longitudinally-mounted
- Transmission: Lotus / Hewland 6-speed manual
- Power: 800-900 hp (race-spec), 1,000-1,200+ hp (qualifying-trim) @ 12,500 rpm
- Weight: 540 kg (1,190 lb)
- Fuel: Elf
- Tyres: Goodyear

Competition history
- Notable entrants: John Player Team Lotus
- Notable drivers: 11. (United Kingdom) Johnny Dumfries; 12. (Brazil) Ayrton Senna
- Debut: 1986 Brazilian Grand Prix
Races	Wins	Podiums	Poles	F/Laps
16	2	8	8	0
- Constructors' Championships: 0
- Drivers' Championships: 0

The Lotus 98T was a Formula One car designed by Gérard Ducarouge and Martin Ogilvie and built by Team Lotus for use in the 1986 Formula One World Championship. Development of the previous year's 97T, the car was driven by Brazilian Ayrton Senna, in his second year with the team, and Scottish newcomer Johnny Dumfries.

== Design ==
The chassis featured a lower monocoque than the 97T as a result of a regulation change stipulating a reduction in fuel capacity to 195 litres. The powertrain consisted of the new Renault EF15B turbocharged V6 engine, driving through a six-speed, manual transmission by Hewland.

The EF15B was to appear in two forms, the standard engine and the "D.P." engine which featured pneumatic valve springs for the first time. At the end of the season Renault introduced the revised EF15C which in addition to the D.P. valve gear also boasted common rail fuel injection and much-revised water cooling through the cylinder head reducing the likelihood of pre-ignition (detonation). Power figures for this period of F1 history are largely speculative as most engine manufactures freely admitted that their testbeds would not have a sufficient power rating to measure the 1.5-litre turbo's output at above 4-bar boost. It is claimed that the Renault EF15B in its pinnacle increment produced in excess of 1000 HP at unrestricted boost pressure, thus making it one of the most powerful engines ever used in Formula 1 history.

This was, however, during qualifying, where teams used unrestricted boost pressures for maximum power output, and for very quick lap times. These qualifying spec. engines, thanks to the unrestricted boost were pushed to their absolute structural limits and would only last about a couple of clean laps. There were also engines set up for races, and these produced around 900 HP in this trim, which was about the maximum the engine could cope with over a race distance. The 98T was also the final Lotus powered by a Renault engine, as Lotus switched to Honda for the following year/season.

The gearbox came in two variants, a conventional five-speed, and a new six-speed. The six-speed was very much a development gearbox and was largely unreliable. While Senna opted to run only with the five-speed, Dumfries was tasked with testing the six-speed. Both gearboxes featured Hewland internals within a Lotus designed casing.

Other notable innovations of the 98T included a two-stage ride height adjustment, water injection through the intercoolers, an early form of barge board (also present on the 97T), and an advanced (for the time) fuel consumption microcomputer.

== Driver controversy ==
At the end of 1985 Elio de Angelis, who had driven for Lotus since 1980, left the team to join Brabham. Lotus intended to replace the Italian with Derek Warwick, out of a drive as a result of Renault closing their factory team. However, Ayrton Senna did not believe that the team could sustain two number 1 drivers and did not want the focus of the team to be on anything but himself. He thus put pressure on Lotus not to sign Warwick, and to instead sign his fellow countryman, Maurício Gugelmin, as a number 2 driver. The team bowed to Senna's first demand, but signed Johnny Dumfries rather than Gugelmin, as long-time sponsor John Player reportedly wanted a British driver. Subsequently, Warwick replaced de Angelis at Brabham after the Italian's fatal testing accident at Paul Ricard (and eventually joined Lotus in 1990), while Gugelmin would not appear in F1 until he joined the March team in 1988.

The 98T was the last Lotus car to carry John Player's famous black and gold colours. With Renault withdrawing from F1 at the end of 1986, Lotus did a deal with Honda to use the Japanese company's engines in 1987 and 1988. As part of the deal, the team signed Honda's official test driver, Satoru Nakajima, as Senna's teammate for 1987. John Player, still wanting a British driver in the team, subsequently pulled its sponsorship, to be replaced by another cigarette brand, Camel.

== Complete Formula One results ==
(key) (results in bold indicate pole position)

Year	Entrant	Engine	Tyres	Driver	1	2	3	4	5	6	7	8	9	10	11	12	13	14	15	16	Pts.	WCC
1986	John Player Team Lotus	Renault Gordini EF15B; V6 tc	**G**		BRA	ESP	SMR	MON	BEL	CAN	DET	FRA	GBR	GER	HUN	AUT	ITA	POR	MEX	AUS	58	3rd
1986	John Player Team Lotus	Renault Gordini EF15B; V6 tc	**G**	Ayrton Senna	**2**	**1**	**Ret**	3	2	5	**1**	**Ret**	Ret	2	**2**	Ret	Ret	**4**	**3**	Ret	58	3rd
1986	John Player Team Lotus	Renault Gordini EF15B; V6 tc	**G**	Johnny Dumfries	9	Ret	Ret	DNQ	Ret	Ret	7	Ret	7	Ret	5	Ret	Ret	9	Ret	6	58	3rd
