= 1986 Spanish Grand Prix =

- Race 2 of 16 in the 1986 Formula One World Championship

Race details
- Date: 13 April 1986
- Official name: Gran Premio Tio Pepe de España
- Location: Circuito Permanente de Jerez, Spain
- Course: Permanent racing facility
- Course length: 4.218 km (2.62 miles)
- Distance: 72 laps, 303.696 km (188.74 miles)
- Weather: Warm, dry and sunny

Pole position
Driver	(Brazil) Ayrton Senna	Lotus-Renault
- Time: 1:21.605

Fastest lap
Driver	(United Kingdom) Nigel Mansell	Williams-Honda
- Time: 1:27.176 on lap 65

Podium
First	(Brazil) Ayrton Senna	Lotus-Renault
Second	(United Kingdom) Nigel Mansell	Williams-Honda
Third	(France) Alain Prost	McLaren-TAG

The 1986 Spanish Grand Prix was a Formula One motor race held at Jerez on 13 April 1986. This was the first Formula One Spanish Grand Prix since the 1981 race was held at Jarama.

This race featured a 3 car battle for the lead over the last half of the race. Ayrton Senna (Lotus-Renault), Nigel Mansell (Williams-Honda) and reigning World Champion Alain Prost (McLaren-TAG) all had opportunities to take the win, with close nose to tail racing around the circuit. Once Mansell pitted for fresh tyres he charged back into the fight making up over 19 seconds in the final 10 laps on his fresh rubber. It was not quite sufficient to take the win, but it was very close with Senna and Mansell taking the chequered flag almost side by side, Senna only 0.014 s in front of Mansell in one of the closest finishes in Formula One history. This was the third-closest finish in Formula One history, after Mansell's spectacular charge allowed him to pull alongside Senna on the final straight.

In an interview after the race, Mansell said he had no problems with Senna's defensive driving (blocking) at the end of the race when the Williams was clearly the quicker car, saying that Senna was entitled to protect his lead. He then jokingly added that the finish was so close they should give them both 7 1/2 points each (which is the average between the winner's 9 points and second place's 6).

== Classification ==
=== Qualifying ===
Pos	No	Driver	Constructor	Q1	Q2	Gap
1	12	(Brazil) Ayrton Senna	Lotus-Renault	1:21.605	1:21.924	—
2	6	(Brazil) Nelson Piquet	Williams-Honda	1:23.097	1:22.431	+0.826
3	5	(United Kingdom) Nigel Mansell	Williams-Honda	1:23.024	1:22.576	+0.971
4	1	(France) Alain Prost	McLaren-TAG	1:23.702	1:22.886	+1.281
5	2	(Finland) Keke Rosberg	McLaren-TAG	1:23.948	1:23.004	+1.399
6	25	(France) René Arnoux	Ligier-Renault	1:24.566	1:24.274	+2.669
7	20	(Austria) Gerhard Berger	Benetton-BMW	1:24.501	1:25.235	+2.896
8	26	(France) Jacques Laffite	Ligier-Renault	1:24.817	1:25.863	+3.212
9	19	(Italy) Teo Fabi	Benetton-BMW	1:25.052	1:26.196	+3.447
10	11	(United Kingdom) Johnny Dumfries	Lotus-Renault	1:29.093	1:25.107	+3.502
11	28	(Sweden) Stefan Johansson	Ferrari	1:25.466	1:25.655	+3.861
12	3	(United Kingdom) Martin Brundle	Tyrrell-Renault	1:25.831	1:41.631	+4.226
13	27	(Italy) Michele Alboreto	Ferrari	1:26.554	1:26.094	+4.489
14	7	(Italy) Riccardo Patrese	Brabham-BMW	1:26.231	1:29.911	+4.626
15	8	(Italy) Elio de Angelis	Brabham-BMW	1:27.300	1:26.550	+4.945
16	14	(United Kingdom) Jonathan Palmer	Zakspeed	1:27.600	1:26.918	+5.313
17	15	(Australia) Alan Jones	Lola-Hart	1:28.645	1:26.946	+5.341
18	16	(France) Patrick Tambay	Lola-Hart	1:27.045	1:26.992	+5.387
19	18	(Belgium) Thierry Boutsen	Arrows-BMW	1:28.812	1:27.169	+5.564
20	4	(France) Philippe Streiff	Tyrrell-Renault	1:27.637	1:28.086	+6.032
21	21	(Italy) Piercarlo Ghinzani	Osella-Alfa Romeo	1:28.894	1:28.423	+6.818
22	17	(Switzerland) Marc Surer	Arrows-BMW	1:28.803	1:28.443	+6.838
23	22	(West Germany) Christian Danner	Osella-Alfa Romeo	1:29.046		+7.441
24	23	(Italy) Andrea de Cesaris	Minardi-Motori Moderni	1:29.195	17:53.811	+7.590
25	24	(Italy) Alessandro Nannini	Minardi-Motori Moderni		1:30.062	+8.457

=== Race ===
Pos	No	Driver	Constructor	Tyre	Laps	Time/Retired	Grid	Pts
1	12	(Brazil) Ayrton Senna	Lotus-Renault	G	72	1:48:47.735	1	9
2	5	(United Kingdom) Nigel Mansell	Williams-Honda	G	72	+ 0.014	3	6
3	1	(France) Alain Prost	McLaren-TAG	G	72	+ 21.552	4	4
4	2	(Finland) Keke Rosberg	McLaren-TAG	G	71	+ 1 lap	5	3
5	19	(Italy) Teo Fabi	Benetton-BMW	P	71	+ 1 lap	9	2
6	20	(Austria) Gerhard Berger	Benetton-BMW	P	71	+ 1 lap	7	1
7	18	(Belgium) Thierry Boutsen	Arrows-BMW	G	68	+ 4 laps	19	
8	16	(France) Patrick Tambay	Lola-Hart	G	66	+ 6 laps	18	
Ret	11	(United Kingdom) Johnny Dumfries	Lotus-Renault	G	52	Gearbox	10	
Ret	3	(United Kingdom) Martin Brundle	Tyrrell-Renault	G	41	Engine	12	
Ret	26	(France) Jacques Laffite	Ligier-Renault	P	40	Halfshaft	8	
Ret	17	(Switzerland) Marc Surer	Arrows-BMW	G	39	Fuel system	22	
Ret	6	(Brazil) Nelson Piquet	Williams-Honda	G	39	Engine	2	
Ret	8	(Italy) Elio de Angelis	Brabham-BMW	P	29	Gearbox	15	
Ret	25	(France) René Arnoux	Ligier-Renault	P	29	Halfshaft	6	
Ret	27	(Italy) Michele Alboreto	Ferrari	G	22	Wheel bearing	13	
Ret	4	(France) Philippe Streiff	Tyrrell-Renault	G	22	Engine	20	
Ret	22	(West Germany) Christian Danner	Osella-Alfa Romeo	P	14	Engine	23	
Ret	28	(Sweden) Stefan Johansson	Ferrari	G	11	Brakes	11	
Ret	21	(Italy) Piercarlo Ghinzani	Osella-Alfa Romeo	P	10	Engine	21	
Ret	7	(Italy) Riccardo Patrese	Brabham-BMW	P	8	Gearbox	14	
Ret	23	(Italy) Andrea de Cesaris	Minardi-Motori Moderni	P	1	Differential	24	
Ret	14	(United Kingdom) Jonathan Palmer	Zakspeed	G	0	Collision	16	
Ret	15	(Australia) Alan Jones	Lola-Hart	G	0	Collision	17	
DNS	24	(Italy) Alessandro Nannini	Minardi-Motori Moderni	P	0	Differential	25	

== Championship standings after the race ==
Drivers' Championship standings

Pos	Driver	Points
1	(Brazil) Ayrton Senna	15
2	(Brazil) Nelson Piquet	9
3	(United Kingdom) Nigel Mansell	6
4	(France) Jacques Laffite	4
4	(France) Alain Prost	4

Constructors' Championship standings

Pos	Constructor	Points
1	(United Kingdom) Williams-Honda	15
1	(United Kingdom) Lotus-Renault	15
3	(France) Ligier-Renault	7
3	(United Kingdom) McLaren-TAG	7
5	(United Kingdom) Benetton-BMW	4

- Note: Only the top five positions are included for both sets of standings.

Previous race: 1986 Brazilian Grand Prix	FIA Formula One World Championship; 1986 season	Next race: 1986 San Marino Grand Prix
Previous race: 1981 Spanish Grand Prix	Spanish Grand Prix	Next race: 1987 Spanish Grand Prix
