= 1986 Brazilian Grand Prix =

- Race 1 of 16 in the 1986 Formula One World Championship
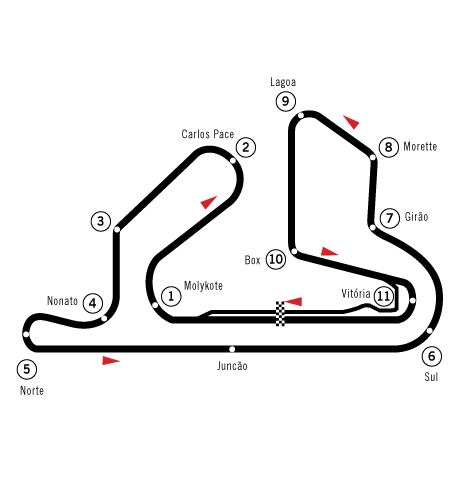

Race details
- Date: 23 March 1986
- Official name: 15º Grande Premio Brasil de Fórmula 1
- Location: Jacarepaguá Circuit, Rio de Janeiro, Brazil
- Course: Permanent racing facility
- Course length: 5.031 km (3.126 miles)
- Distance: 61 laps, 306.891 km (190.693 miles)
- Weather: Hot, dry and sunny

Pole position
Driver	(Brazil) Ayrton Senna	Lotus-Renault
- Time: 1:25.501

Fastest lap
Driver	(Brazil) Nelson Piquet	Williams-Honda
- Time: 1:33.546 on lap 46

Podium
First	(Brazil) Nelson Piquet	Williams-Honda
Second	(Brazil) Ayrton Senna	Lotus-Renault
Third	(France) Jacques Laffite	Ligier-Renault

The 1986 Brazilian Grand Prix was a Formula One motor race held at Jacarepaguá in Rio de Janeiro on 23 March 1986. It was the opening race of the 1986 Formula One World Championship. It was the 15th Brazilian Grand Prix and the seventh to be held at Jacarepaguá. The race was held over 61 laps of the 5.03-kilometre (3.13 mi) circuit for a race distance of 306.9 kilometres (190.7 mi).

The race was won by local driver Nelson Piquet, driving a Williams-Honda, after he started from second position. Compatriot Ayrton Senna took pole position in his Lotus-Renault, but Piquet overtook him on lap 3 and went on to win from him by 34 seconds. Frenchman Jacques Laffite finished third in a Ligier-Renault.

== Summary ==
The new season had seen many driver changes, the most significant was Piquet's arrival at Williams after seven years at Brabham, while Keke Rosberg left Williams to join McLaren and Elio de Angelis joined Brabham after several seasons at Lotus. Senna used his influence at Lotus to ensure they hired a driver that would not interfere with his campaign which left Derek Warwick out of a seat, although that would prove to be temporary. Williams was missing their team principal, Frank Williams who had had a car accident in pre-season testing that left him a quadriplegic.

Senna led from pole position but was soon under threat from the Williams pair. Nigel Mansell spun off the track on the opening lap after contact with Senna, but Piquet was in the lead by lap three. As pitstops began it started to look as though Alain Prost (McLaren MP4/2C) might pull a surprise by only pitting once and snatching the win away from the Brazilians but that came to an end along with Prost's TAG-Porsche engine just past half-distance.

There was no threat to the Brazilian pair after that with Piquet retaking the lead from Senna after the latter's final tyre stop. Behind Laffite was his Ligier teammate René Arnoux. Fifth place was taken by the Tyrrell 014-Renault of Martin Brundle for his first official points finish since his debut season two years previously (Brundle had scored several points in 1984 including 2 points on debut in Brazil and a 2nd placing at Detroit, but had lost all points when Tyrrell were disqualified for the season). Gerhard Berger finished sixth in his Benetton B186-BMW on the debut for the new team which had taken over the Toleman team during the off-season. Philippe Streiff in the second Tyrrell, Elio de Angelis (Brabham BT55), Johnny Dumfries (Lotus 98T) and Teo Fabi (Benetton B186) were the only other finishers in a day of high attrition where Mansell had been the only non-mechanical retirement.

== Classification ==
=== Qualifying ===
Pos	No	Driver	Constructor	Q1	Q2	Gap
1	12	(Brazil) Ayrton Senna	Lotus-Renault	1:26.893	1:25.501	
2	6	(Brazil) Nelson Piquet	Williams-Honda	1:26.266	1:26.755	+0.765
3	5	(United Kingdom) Nigel Mansell	Williams-Honda	1:27.406	1:26.749	+1.248
4	25	(France) René Arnoux	Ligier-Renault	1:30.563	1:27.133	+1.632
5	26	(France) Jacques Laffite	Ligier-Renault	1:30.175	1:27.190	+1.689
6	27	(Italy) Michele Alboreto	Ferrari	1:30.156	1:27.485	+1.984
7	2	(Finland) Keke Rosberg	McLaren-TAG	1:28.763	1:27.705	+2.204
8	28	(Sweden) Stefan Johansson	Ferrari	1:30.363	1:27.711	+2.210
9	1	(France) Alain Prost	McLaren-TAG	1:28.467	1:28.099	+2.598
10	7	(Italy) Riccardo Patrese	Brabham-BMW		1:29.294	+3.793
11	11	(United Kingdom) Johnny Dumfries	Lotus-Renault	1:30.452	1:29.503	+4.002
12	19	(Italy) Teo Fabi	Benetton-BMW	1:31.138	1:29.748	+4.247
13	16	(France) Patrick Tambay	Lola-Hart	1:31.429	1:30.594	+5.093
14	8	(Italy) Elio de Angelis	Brabham-BMW	1:31.682	1:31.074	+5.573
15	18	(Belgium) Thierry Boutsen	Arrows-BMW	1:32.911	1:31.244	+5.743
16	20	(Austria) Gerhard Berger	Benetton-BMW	1:31.653	1:31.313	+5.812
17	3	(United Kingdom) Martin Brundle	Tyrrell-Renault	1:32.983	1:32.009	+6.508
18	4	(France) Philippe Streiff	Tyrrell-Renault	1:35.669	1:32.388	+6.887
19	15	(Australia) Alan Jones	Lola-Hart	1:33.664	1:33.236	+7.735
20	17	(Switzerland) Marc Surer	Arrows-BMW	1:33.781	1:34.144	+8.280
21	14	(United Kingdom) Jonathan Palmer	Zakspeed	1:35.199	1:33.784	+8.283
22	23	(Italy) Andrea de Cesaris	Minardi-Motori Moderni	1:37.835	1:34.646	+9.145
23	21	(Italy) Piercarlo Ghinzani	Osella-Alfa Romeo	1:38.165	1:35.980	+10.479
24	22	(West Germany) Christian Danner	Osella-Alfa Romeo	1:39.389	1:36.558	+11.057
25	24	(Italy) Alessandro Nannini	Minardi-Motori Moderni	1:40.739	1:37.466	+11.965

=== Race ===
Pos	No	Driver	Constructor	Laps	Time/Retired	Grid	Points
1	6	(Brazil) Nelson Piquet	Williams-Honda	61	1:39:32.583	2	9
2	12	(Brazil) Ayrton Senna	Lotus-Renault	61	+ 34.827	1	6
3	26	(France) Jacques Laffite	Ligier-Renault	61	+ 59.759	5	4
4	25	(France) René Arnoux	Ligier-Renault	61	+ 1:28.429	4	3
5	3	(United Kingdom) Martin Brundle	Tyrrell-Renault	60	+ 1 lap	17	2
6	20	(Austria) Gerhard Berger	Benetton-BMW	59	+ 2 laps	16	1
7	4	(France) Philippe Streiff	Tyrrell-Renault	59	+ 2 laps	18	
8	8	(Italy) Elio de Angelis	Brabham-BMW	58	+ 3 laps	14	
9	11	(United Kingdom) Johnny Dumfries	Lotus-Renault	58	+ 3 laps	11	
10	19	(Italy) Teo Fabi	Benetton-BMW	56	+ 5 laps	12	
Ret	18	(Belgium) Thierry Boutsen	Arrows-BMW	37	Exhaust	15	
Ret	27	(Italy) Michele Alboreto	Ferrari	35	Fuel system	6	
Ret	1	(France) Alain Prost	McLaren-TAG	30	Engine	9	
Ret	22	(West Germany) Christian Danner	Osella-Alfa Romeo	29	Engine	24	
Ret	28	(Sweden) Stefan Johansson	Ferrari	26	Brakes	8	
Ret	16	(France) Patrick Tambay	Lola-Hart	24	Battery	13	
Ret	7	(Italy) Riccardo Patrese	Brabham-BMW	21	Water leak	10	
Ret	14	(United Kingdom) Jonathan Palmer	Zakspeed	20	Engine	21	
Ret	17	(Switzerland) Marc Surer	Arrows-BMW	19	Engine	20	
Ret	24	(Italy) Alessandro Nannini	Minardi-Motori Moderni	18	Clutch	25	
Ret	23	(Italy) Andrea de Cesaris	Minardi-Motori Moderni	16	Turbo	22	
Ret	21	(Italy) Piercarlo Ghinzani	Osella-Alfa Romeo	16	Engine	23	
Ret	2	(Finland) Keke Rosberg	McLaren-TAG	6	Engine	7	
Ret	15	(Australia) Alan Jones	Lola-Hart	5	Injection	19	
Ret	5	(United Kingdom) Nigel Mansell	Williams-Honda	0	Spun off	3	

== Championship standings after the race ==
Drivers' Championship standings

Pos	Driver	Points
1	(Brazil) Nelson Piquet	9
2	(Brazil) Ayrton Senna	6
3	(France) Jacques Laffite	4
4	(France) René Arnoux	3
5	(United Kingdom) Martin Brundle	2

Constructors' Championship standings

Pos	Constructor	Points
1	(United Kingdom) Williams-Honda	9
2	(France) Ligier-Renault	7
3	(United Kingdom) Lotus-Renault	6
4	(United Kingdom) Tyrrell-Renault	2
5	(United Kingdom) Benetton-BMW	1

- Note: Only the top five positions are included for both sets of standings.

Previous race: 1985 Australian Grand Prix	FIA Formula One World Championship; 1986 season	Next race: 1986 Spanish Grand Prix
Previous race: 1985 Brazilian Grand Prix	Brazilian Grand Prix	Next race: 1987 Brazilian Grand Prix
