= 1986 Belgian Grand Prix =

- Race 5 of 16 in the 1986 Formula One World Championship
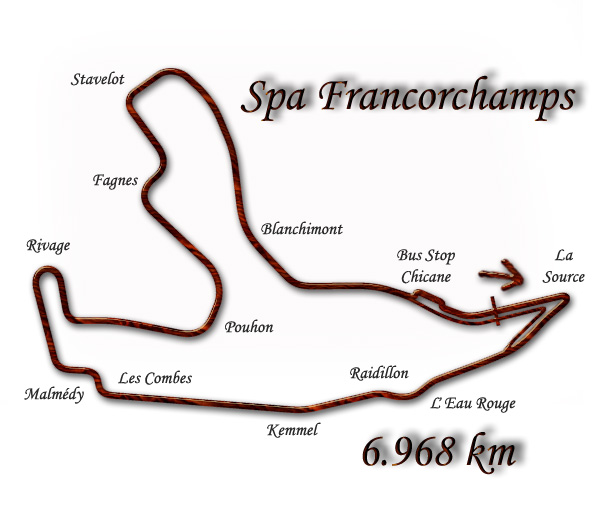

Race details
- Date: 25 May 1986
- Location: Circuit de Spa-Francorchamps; Francorchamps, Wallonia, Belgium
- Course: Permanent racing facility
- Course length: 6.940 km (4.312 miles)
- Distance: 43 laps, 301.172 km (187.136 miles)
- Weather: Dry

Pole position
Driver	(Brazil) Nelson Piquet	Williams-Honda
- Time: 1:54.331

Fastest lap
Driver	(France) Alain Prost	McLaren-TAG
- Time: 1:59.282 on lap 31

Podium
First	(United Kingdom) Nigel Mansell	Williams-Honda
Second	(Brazil) Ayrton Senna	Lotus-Renault
Third	(Sweden) Stefan Johansson	Ferrari

The 1986 Belgian Grand Prix was a Formula One motor race held at the Circuit de Spa-Francorchamps on 25 May 1986. It was the fifth race of the 1986 FIA Formula One World Championship. The race was the 44th Belgian Grand Prix and the 32nd to be held at Spa-Francorchamps. It was held over 43 laps of the 7-kilometre (4.35 mi) circuit for a total race distance of 301 kilometres (187 mi).

The race was won by British driver Nigel Mansell, driving a Williams-Honda. It was Mansell's first victory of the season. Brazilian driver Ayrton Senna finished second in a Lotus-Renault, with Sweden's Stefan Johansson third in a Ferrari. Senna's result allowed him to take the lead of the Drivers' Championship from Frenchman Alain Prost, who could only manage sixth in his McLaren-TAG.

== Qualifying ==
Brabham entered only one BT55, the car of Riccardo Patrese. Elio de Angelis had been killed in a testing accident at Circuit Paul Ricard just over a week before the race. Williams-Honda driver Nelson Piquet took pole late in the qualifying session using the team's spare car. Piquet's engine blew up in his race car during qualifying forcing him into the spare. Austrian Gerhard Berger scored his first front row start and the first for the BMW powered Benetton after being fastest in Friday qualifying. His Friday time of 1:54.468 was half a second faster than his Saturday time but still good enough for the front row. World Champion Alain Prost was third in his McLaren-TAG with the Lotus-Renault of Ayrton Senna completing the second row. Nigel Mansell qualified fifth in his Williams-Honda with Teo Fabi completing the top 6 in his Benetton-BMW.

== Race ==
Piquet won the start and led the field into the La Source hairpin but behind him was chaos. Senna had made a good start from the 2nd row and when Berger's car twitched under brakes Senna went to the outside and then turned hard into the right hand corner. In doing so he squeezed out Berger who in turn squeezed out Prost while avoiding Senna. Prost, who had gone inside when the Benetton twitched, hit the inside barrier damaging the nose of his car with the right front wing drooping on the ground. He then drove over Berger's wheel launching the rear of his McLaren into the air. Other drivers were forced to take avoiding action with Berger's teammate Fabi having to stop to avoid hitting his teammates damaged car while Prost's teammate Keke Rosberg had to do a complete 180 degree turn the wrong way to avoid the Benettons. However, the only car that retired from the crash was the Lola-Ford of Patrick Tambay who went inside the stopped Fabi but hit his right rear with his left front wheel and damaged the left front suspension putting him out on the spot. Through it all Senna emerged unscathed in 2nd place followed by Mansell and the two Ferraris of Stefan Johansson and Michele Alboreto.

Both Berger and Prost pitted at the end of lap 1 with Berger in for a long stop for repairs and Prost for a new nose cone, his rear suspension survived intact despite its unscheduled first corner flight. Mansell disposed of Senna on lap 2, but spun on lap 5, falling back to 4th place. Piquet led until suffering turbo failure on lap 16, leaving Senna in front, ahead of Mansell, who shortly overtook Senna during pit stops. Prost emerged last on the road and only a few hundred metres in front of the leading Williams, on his way to being the last car on the lead lap and finishing in sixth place. He set a new lap record of 1:59.282 on lap 31.

Nigel Mansell scored his first win of 1986 and the third win of his career. Senna, the cause of the first corner crash, finished 20 seconds behind in second, with Stefan Johansson finishing third after passing team leader Alboreto only two laps from home. Jacques Laffite finished fifth in his Ligier-Renault with Prost gaining a vital World Championship point for finishing sixth. Swiss driver Marc Surer finished ninth in his Arrows A8 in what would be the last Grand Prix of Surer's career – he would be seriously injured competing in the European Rally Championship a week later. Post race, Mansell dedicated his win to his friend and former team mate Elio de Angelis, who died just ten days prior to Spa in a testing accident at Paul Ricard.

== Classification ==
=== Qualifying ===
Pos	No	Driver	Constructor	Q1	Q2	Gap
1	6	(Brazil) Nelson Piquet	Williams-Honda	1:54.637	1:54.331	—
2	20	(Austria) Gerhard Berger	Benetton-BMW	1:54.468	1:54.939	+0.137
3	1	(France) Alain Prost	McLaren-TAG	1:55.039	1:54.501	+0.170
4	12	(Brazil) Ayrton Senna	Lotus-Renault	1:55.776	1:54.576	+0.245
5	5	(United Kingdom) Nigel Mansell	Williams-Honda	1:55.345	1:54.582	+0.251
6	19	(Italy) Teo Fabi	Benetton-BMW	1:57.440	1:54.765	+0.434
7	25	(France) René Arnoux	Ligier-Renault	1:57.269	1:55.576	+1.245
8	2	(Finland) Keke Rosberg	McLaren-TAG	1:56.534	1:55.662	+1.331
9	27	(Italy) Michele Alboreto	Ferrari	1:56.294	1:56.242	+1.911
10	16	(France) Patrick Tambay	Lola-Ford	1:58.574	1:56.309	+1.978
11	28	(Sweden) Stefan Johansson	Ferrari	1:57.697	1:56.496	+2.165
12	3	(United Kingdom) Martin Brundle	Tyrrell-Renault	1:57.797	1:56.537	+2.206
13	11	(United Kingdom) Johnny Dumfries	Lotus-Renault	1:58.619	1:57.462	+3.131
14	18	(Belgium) Thierry Boutsen	Arrows-BMW	1:57.918	1:57.612	+3.281
15	7	(Italy) Riccardo Patrese	Brabham-BMW	2:00.357	1:57.612	+3.281
16	15	(Australia) Alan Jones	Lola-Ford	1:59.180	1:57.815	+3.484
17	26	(France) Jacques Laffite	Ligier-Renault	1:58.238	2:27.817	+3.907
18	4	(France) Philippe Streiff	Tyrrell-Renault	1:59.347	1:58.603	+4.272
19	23	(Italy) Andrea de Cesaris	Minardi-Motori Moderni	2:00.984	1:59.960	+5.629
20	14	(United Kingdom) Jonathan Palmer	Zakspeed	2:02.307	2:00.148	+5.817
21	17	(Switzerland) Marc Surer	Arrows-BMW	2:01.320	2:01.415	+4.661
22	24	(Italy) Alessandro Nannini	Minardi-Motori Moderni	2:01.528	2:01.354	+7.023
23	29	(Netherlands) Huub Rothengatter	Zakspeed	2:06.006	2:03.842	+9.511
24	21	(Italy) Piercarlo Ghinzani	Osella-Alfa Romeo	2:05.092	3:38.767	+10.761
25	22	(West Germany) Christian Danner	Osella-Alfa Romeo	2:09.465	2:06.219	+11.888

=== Race ===
Pos	No	Driver	Constructor	Laps	Time/Retired	Grid	Points
1	5	(United Kingdom) Nigel Mansell	Williams-Honda	43	1:27:57.925	5	9
2	12	(Brazil) Ayrton Senna	Lotus-Renault	43	+ 19.827	4	6
3	28	(Sweden) Stefan Johansson	Ferrari	43	+ 23.592	11	4
4	27	(Italy) Michele Alboreto	Ferrari	43	+ 29.634	9	3
5	26	(France) Jacques Laffite	Ligier-Renault	43	+ 1:10.690	17	2
6	1	(France) Alain Prost	McLaren-TAG	43	+ 2:17.772	3	1
7	19	(Italy) Teo Fabi	Benetton-BMW	42	+ 1 Lap	6	
8	7	(Italy) Riccardo Patrese	Brabham-BMW	42	+ 1 Lap	15	
9	17	(Switzerland) Marc Surer	Arrows-BMW	41	+ 2 Laps	21	
10	20	(Austria) Gerhard Berger	Benetton-BMW	41	+ 2 Laps	2	
11	15	(Australia) Alan Jones	Lola-Ford	40	Out of Fuel	16	
12	4	(France) Philippe Streiff	Tyrrell-Renault	40	+ 3 Laps	18	
13	14	(United Kingdom) Jonathan Palmer	Zakspeed	37	+ 6 Laps	20	
Ret	23	(Italy) Andrea de Cesaris	Minardi-Motori Moderni	35	Out of Fuel	19	
Ret	29	(Netherlands) Huub Rothengatter	Zakspeed	25	Electrical	23	
Ret	3	(United Kingdom) Martin Brundle	Tyrrell-Renault	25	Gearbox	12	
Ret	24	(Italy) Alessandro Nannini	Minardi-Motori Moderni	24	Gearbox	22	
Ret	25	(France) René Arnoux	Ligier-Renault	23	Engine	7	
Ret	6	(Brazil) Nelson Piquet	Williams-Honda	16	Turbo	1	
Ret	18	(Belgium) Thierry Boutsen	Arrows-BMW	7	Electrical	14	
Ret	11	(United Kingdom) Johnny Dumfries	Lotus-Renault	7	Spun Off	13	
Ret	2	(Finland) Keke Rosberg	McLaren-TAG	6	Engine	8	
Ret	21	(Italy) Piercarlo Ghinzani	Osella-Alfa Romeo	3	Engine	24	
Ret	22	(Germany) Christian Danner	Osella-Alfa Romeo	2	Engine	25	
Ret	16	(France) Patrick Tambay	Lola-Ford	0	Accident	10	

== Championship standings after the race ==
Drivers' Championship standings

Pos	Driver	Points
1	(Brazil) Ayrton Senna	25
2	(France) Alain Prost	23
3	(United Kingdom) Nigel Mansell	18
4	(Brazil) Nelson Piquet	15
5	(Finland) Keke Rosberg	11

Constructors' Championship standings

Pos	Constructor	Points
1	(United Kingdom) McLaren-TAG	34
2	(United Kingdom) Williams-Honda	33
3	(United Kingdom) Lotus-Renault	25
4	(France) Ligier-Renault	12
5	(Italy) Ferrari	10

- Note: Only the top five positions are included for both sets of standings.

Previous race: 1986 Monaco Grand Prix	FIA Formula One World Championship; 1986 season	Next race: 1986 Canadian Grand Prix
Previous race: 1985 Belgian Grand Prix	Belgian Grand Prix	Next race: 1987 Belgian Grand Prix
