= 1986 Formula One World Championship =

40th season of FIA Formula One motor racing

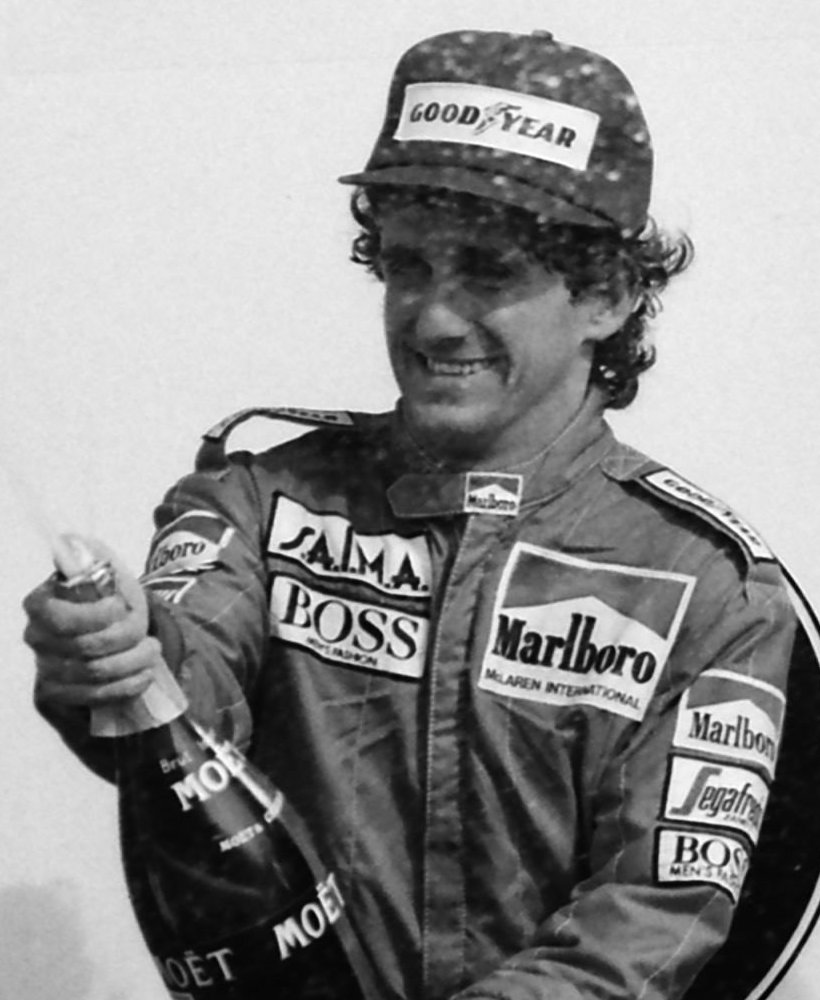
Alain Prost (pictured in 1985) won his second consecutive Drivers' Championship, driving for McLaren. The first driver in 26 years to win consecutive titles.

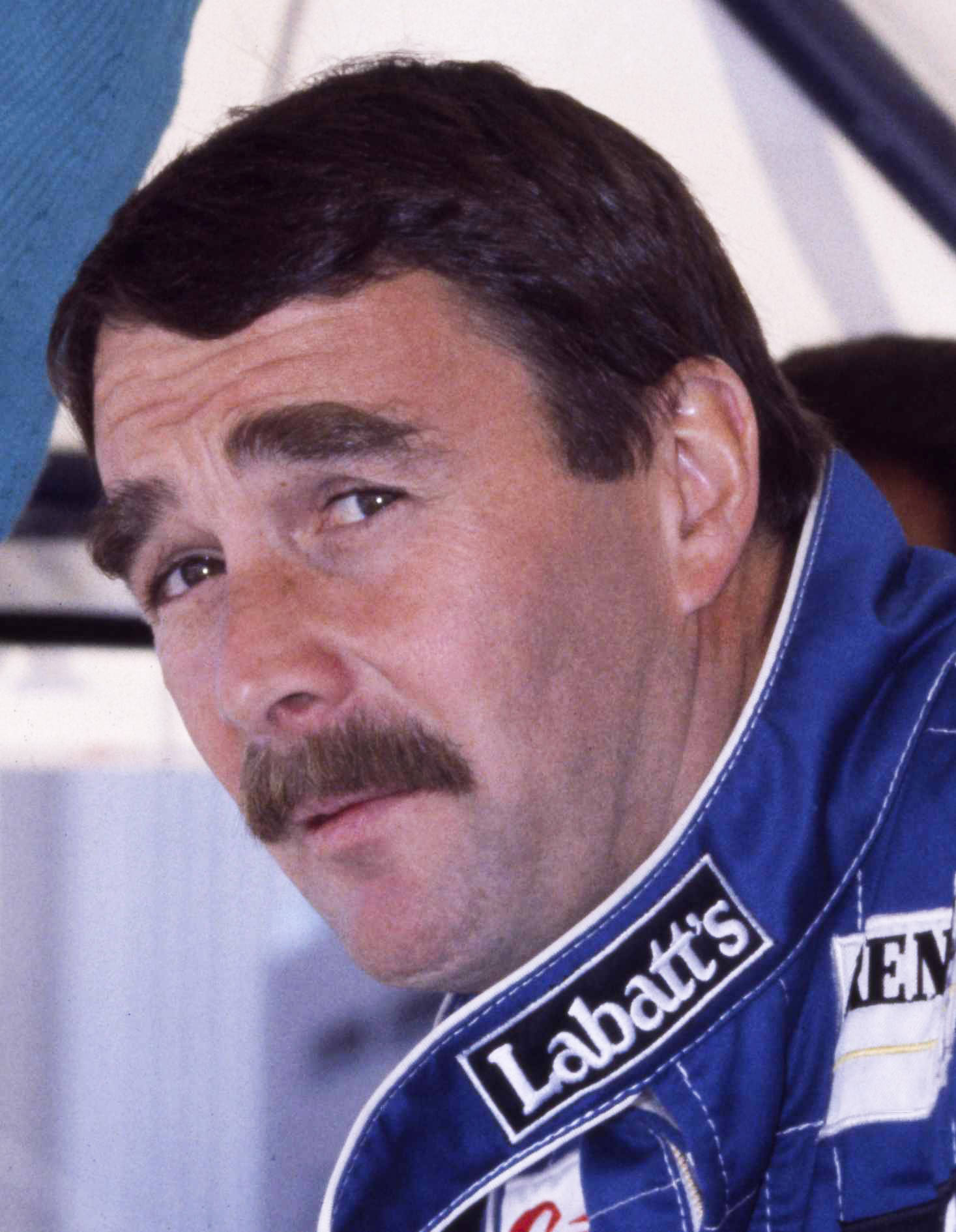
Nigel Mansell, driving for Williams, finished runner-up to Prost by two points after dramatically retiring from the final race.

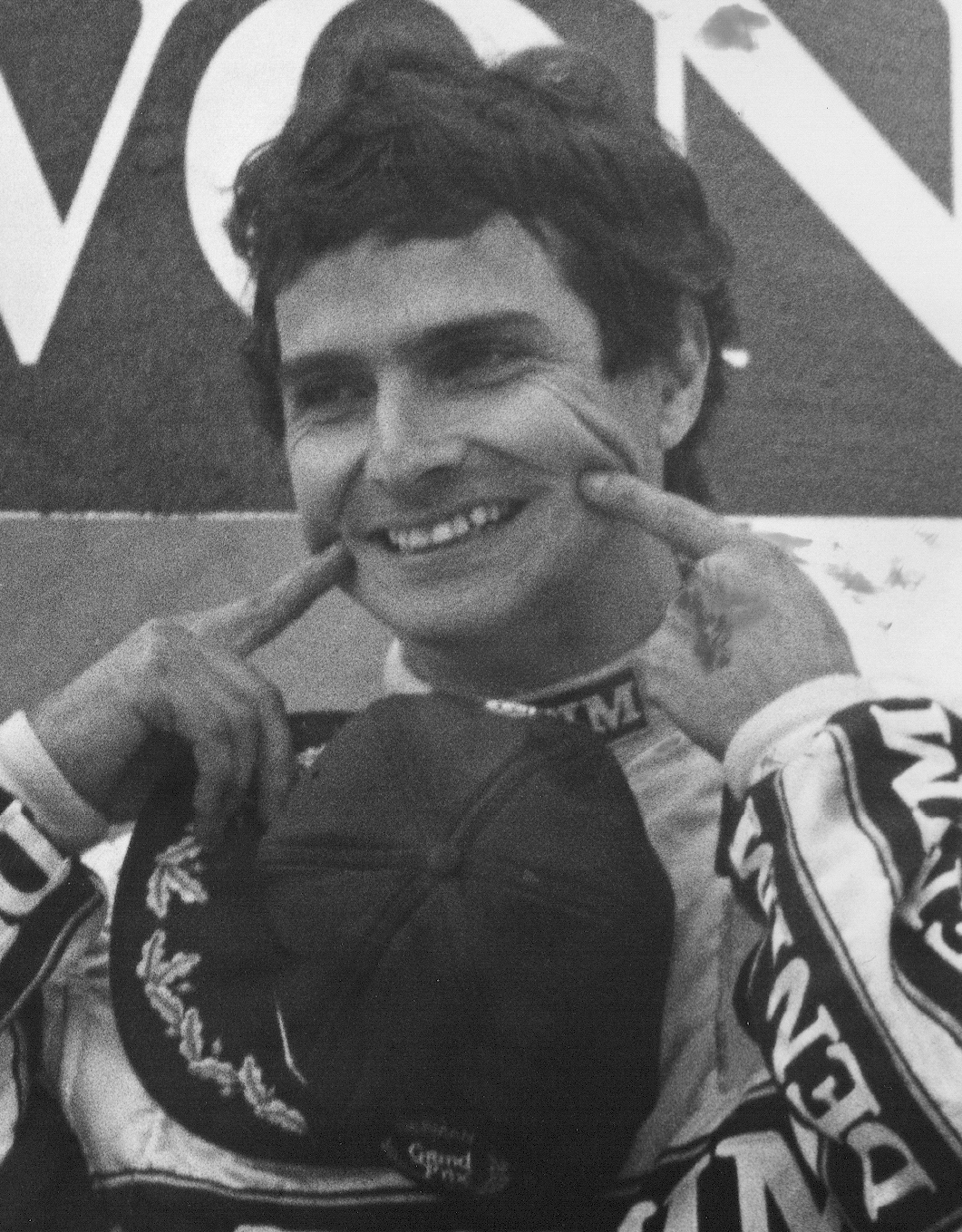
Mansell's Williams teammate and then two-time champion Nelson Piquet (pictured in 1987) finished third, three points behind Prost.

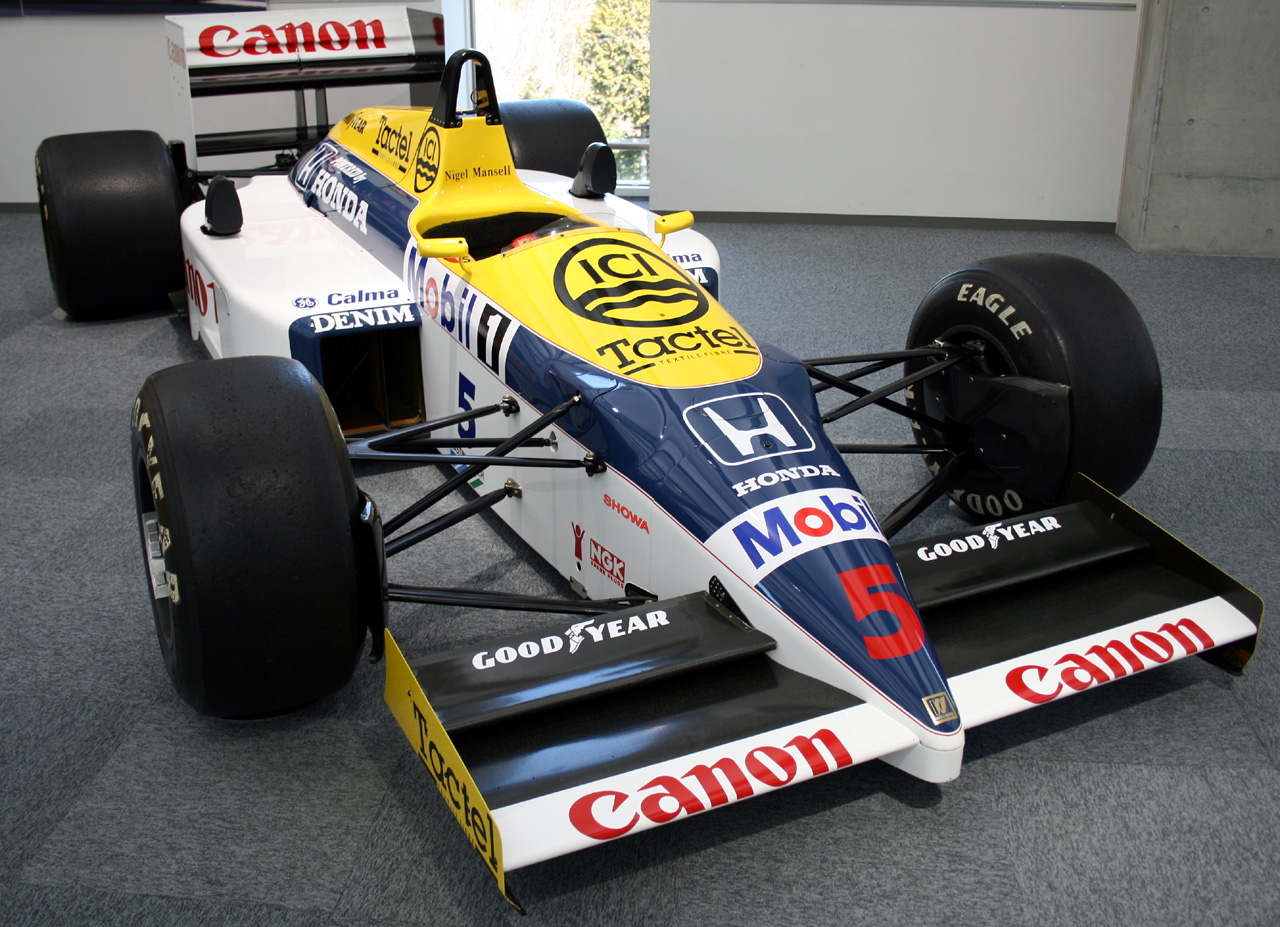
Williams-Honda won the World Constructors' Championship with the Williams FW11.

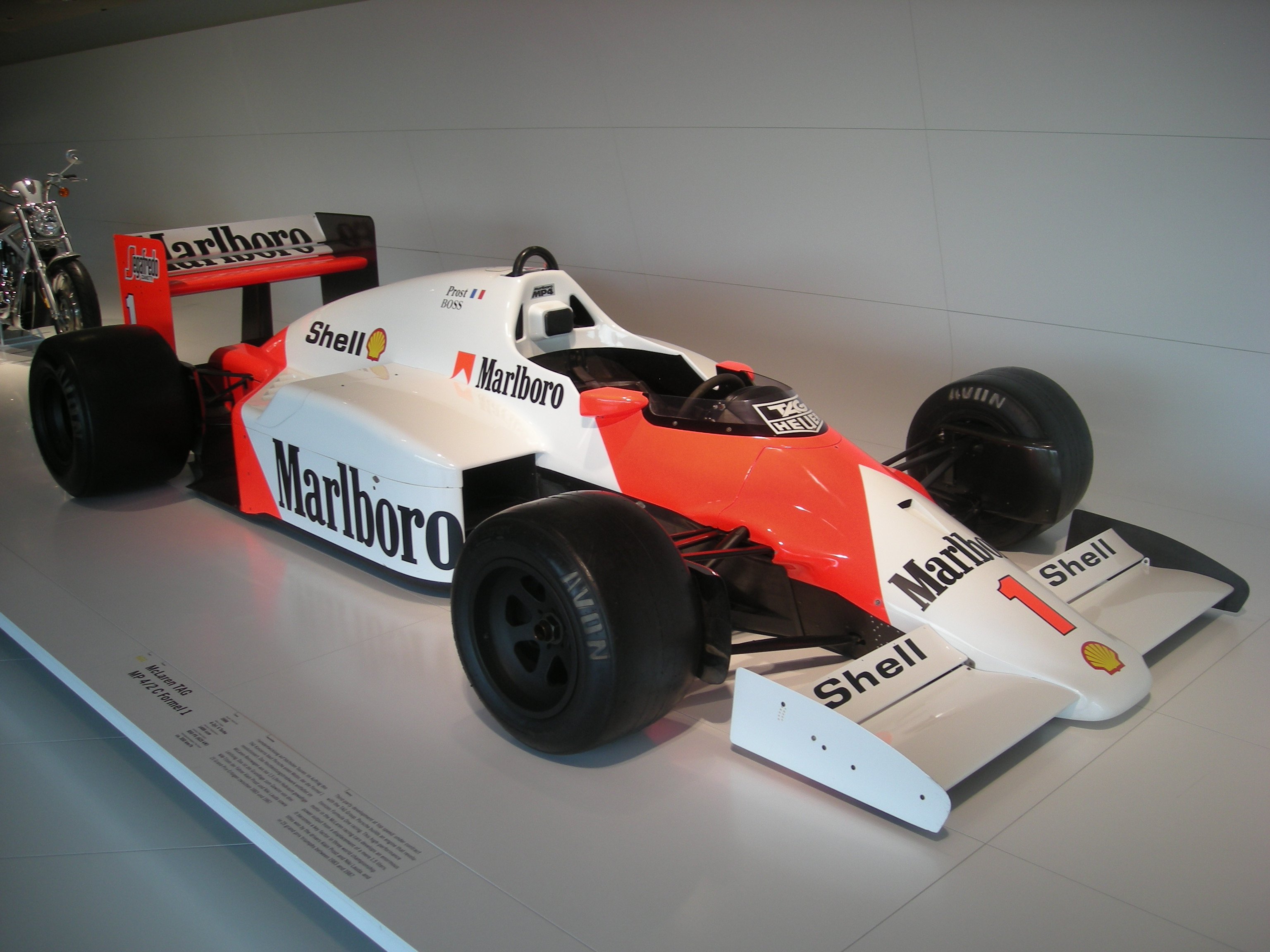
McLaren-TAG finished runner-up in the Constructors' Championship with the McLaren MP4/2.

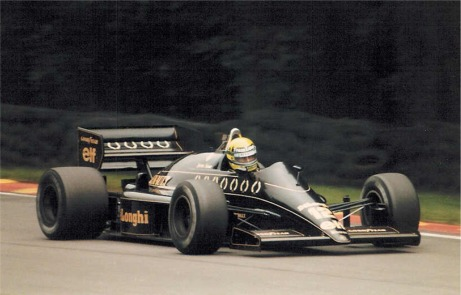
Lotus-Renault finished third in the Constructors' Championship with the Lotus 98T.

The 1986 FIA Formula One World Championship was the 40th season of FIA Formula One motor racing. It featured the 1986 Formula One World Championship for Drivers and the 1986 Formula One World Championship for Manufacturers, both of which commenced on 23 March and ended on 26 October after sixteen races. The Drivers' Championship was won by Alain Prost, Prost was the first driver to win back-to-back Drivers' Championships since Jack Brabham in 1959 and 1960. Together with Prost, Nigel Mansell, Nelson Piquet and Ayrton Senna dominated throughout the season and formed what was dubbed as the "Gang of Four". The 1986 season also marked the final Formula One season of 1982 Drivers' Champion Keke Rosberg who retired from the sport at the end of season following a difficult season with McLaren.

After 1986, Renault left the sport as an engine supplier due to company restructuring, only to return in 1989. The Constructors' Championship was won by Williams-Honda. Honda became the first Japanese engine supplier to win a Constructors' Championship.

== Drivers and constructors ==
The following competitors contested the 1986 Formula One World Championship.

Entrant	Constructor	Chassis	Engine	Tyres	No	Driver	Rounds
(United Kingdom) Marlboro McLaren TAG Turbo	McLaren-TAG	MP4/2C	TAG-Porsche TTE PO1 1.5 V6 t	G	1	(France) Alain Prost	All
(United Kingdom) Marlboro McLaren TAG Turbo	McLaren-TAG	MP4/2C	TAG-Porsche TTE PO1 1.5 V6 t	G	2	(Finland) Keke Rosberg	All
(United Kingdom) Data General Team Tyrrell	Tyrrell-Renault	014; 015	Renault EF4B 1.5 V6 t	G	3	(United Kingdom) Martin Brundle	All
(United Kingdom) Data General Team Tyrrell	Tyrrell-Renault	014; 015	Renault EF4B 1.5 V6 t	G	4	(France) Philippe Streiff	All
(United Kingdom) Canon Williams Honda Team	Williams-Honda	FW11	Honda RA166E 1.5 V6 t	G	5	(United Kingdom) Nigel Mansell	All
(United Kingdom) Canon Williams Honda Team	Williams-Honda	FW11	Honda RA166E 1.5 V6 t	G	6	(Brazil) Nelson Piquet	All
(United Kingdom) Olivetti Brabham	Brabham-BMW	BT54; BT55	BMW M12/13/1 1.5 L4 t	P	7	(Italy) Riccardo Patrese	All
(United Kingdom) Olivetti Brabham	Brabham-BMW	BT54; BT55	BMW M12/13/1 1.5 L4 t	P	8	(Italy) Elio de Angelis	1–4
(United Kingdom) Olivetti Brabham	Brabham-BMW	BT54; BT55	BMW M12/13/1 1.5 L4 t	P	8	(United Kingdom) Derek Warwick	6–16
(United Kingdom) John Player Special Team Lotus	Lotus-Renault	98T	Renault EF15B 1.5 V6 t	G	11	(United Kingdom) Johnny Dumfries	All
(United Kingdom) John Player Special Team Lotus	Lotus-Renault	98T	Renault EF15B 1.5 V6 t	G	12	(Brazil) Ayrton Senna	All
(West Germany) West Zakspeed Racing	Zakspeed	861	Zakspeed 1500/4 1.5 L4 t	G	14	(United Kingdom) Jonathan Palmer	All
(West Germany) West Zakspeed Racing	Zakspeed	861	Zakspeed 1500/4 1.5 L4 t	G	29	(Netherlands) Huub Rothengatter	3–16
(United States) Team Haas (USA) Ltd.	Lola-Hart	THL1	Hart 415T 1.5 L4 t	G	15	(Australia) Alan Jones	1–2
(United States) Team Haas (USA) Ltd.	Lola-Hart	THL1	Hart 415T 1.5 L4 t	G	16	(France) Patrick Tambay	1–3
(United States) Team Haas (USA) Ltd.	Lola-Ford	THL2	Ford-TEC 1.5 V6 t	G	15	(Australia) Alan Jones	3–16
(United States) Team Haas (USA) Ltd.	Lola-Ford	THL2	Ford-TEC 1.5 V6 t	G	16	(France) Patrick Tambay	4–6, 8–16
(United States) Team Haas (USA) Ltd.	Lola-Ford	THL2	Ford-TEC 1.5 V6 t	G	16	(United States) Eddie Cheever	7
(United Kingdom) Barclay Arrows BMW	Arrows-BMW	A8; A9	BMW M12/13 1.5 L4 t	G	17	(Switzerland) Marc Surer	1–5
(United Kingdom) Barclay Arrows BMW	Arrows-BMW	A8; A9	BMW M12/13 1.5 L4 t	G	17	(West Germany) Christian Danner	7–16
(United Kingdom) Barclay Arrows BMW	Arrows-BMW	A8; A9	BMW M12/13 1.5 L4 t	G	18	(Belgium) Thierry Boutsen	All
(United Kingdom) Benetton BMW Team	Benetton-BMW	B186	BMW M12/13 1.5 L4 t	P	19	(Italy) Teo Fabi	All
(United Kingdom) Benetton BMW Team	Benetton-BMW	B186	BMW M12/13 1.5 L4 t	P	20	(Austria) Gerhard Berger	All
(Italy) Osella Squadra Corse	Osella-Alfa Romeo	FA1G; FA1F; FA1H	Alfa Romeo 890T 1.5 V8 t	P	21	(Italy) Piercarlo Ghinzani	All
(Italy) Osella Squadra Corse	Osella-Alfa Romeo	FA1G; FA1F; FA1H	Alfa Romeo 890T 1.5 V8 t	P	22	(West Germany) Christian Danner	1–6
(Italy) Osella Squadra Corse	Osella-Alfa Romeo	FA1G; FA1F; FA1H	Alfa Romeo 890T 1.5 V8 t	P	22	(Canada) Allen Berg	7–12, 14–16
(Italy) Osella Squadra Corse	Osella-Alfa Romeo	FA1G; FA1F; FA1H	Alfa Romeo 890T 1.5 V8 t	P	22	(Italy) Alex Caffi	13
(Italy) Minardi Team	Minardi-Motori Moderni	M185B; M186	Motori Moderni Tipo 615–90 1.5 V6 t	P	23	(Italy) Andrea de Cesaris	All
(Italy) Minardi Team	Minardi-Motori Moderni	M185B; M186	Motori Moderni Tipo 615–90 1.5 V6 t	P	24	(Italy) Alessandro Nannini	All
(France) Équipe Ligier	Ligier-Renault	JS27	Renault EF4B 1.5 V6 t Renault EF15B 1.5 V6 t	P	25	(France) René Arnoux	All
(France) Équipe Ligier	Ligier-Renault	JS27	Renault EF4B 1.5 V6 t Renault EF15B 1.5 V6 t	P	26	(France) Jacques Laffite	1–9
(France) Équipe Ligier	Ligier-Renault	JS27	Renault EF4B 1.5 V6 t Renault EF15B 1.5 V6 t	P	26	(France) Philippe Alliot	10–16
(Italy) Ferrari	Ferrari	F1/86	Ferrari Tipo 032 1.5 V6 t	G	27	(Italy) Michele Alboreto	All
(Italy) Ferrari	Ferrari	F1/86	Ferrari Tipo 032 1.5 V6 t	G	28	(Sweden) Stefan Johansson	All
(France) Jolly Club SpA	AGS-Motori Moderni	JH21C	Motori Moderni Tipo 615–90 1.5 V6 t	P	31	(Italy) Ivan Capelli	13–14

=== Team changes ===
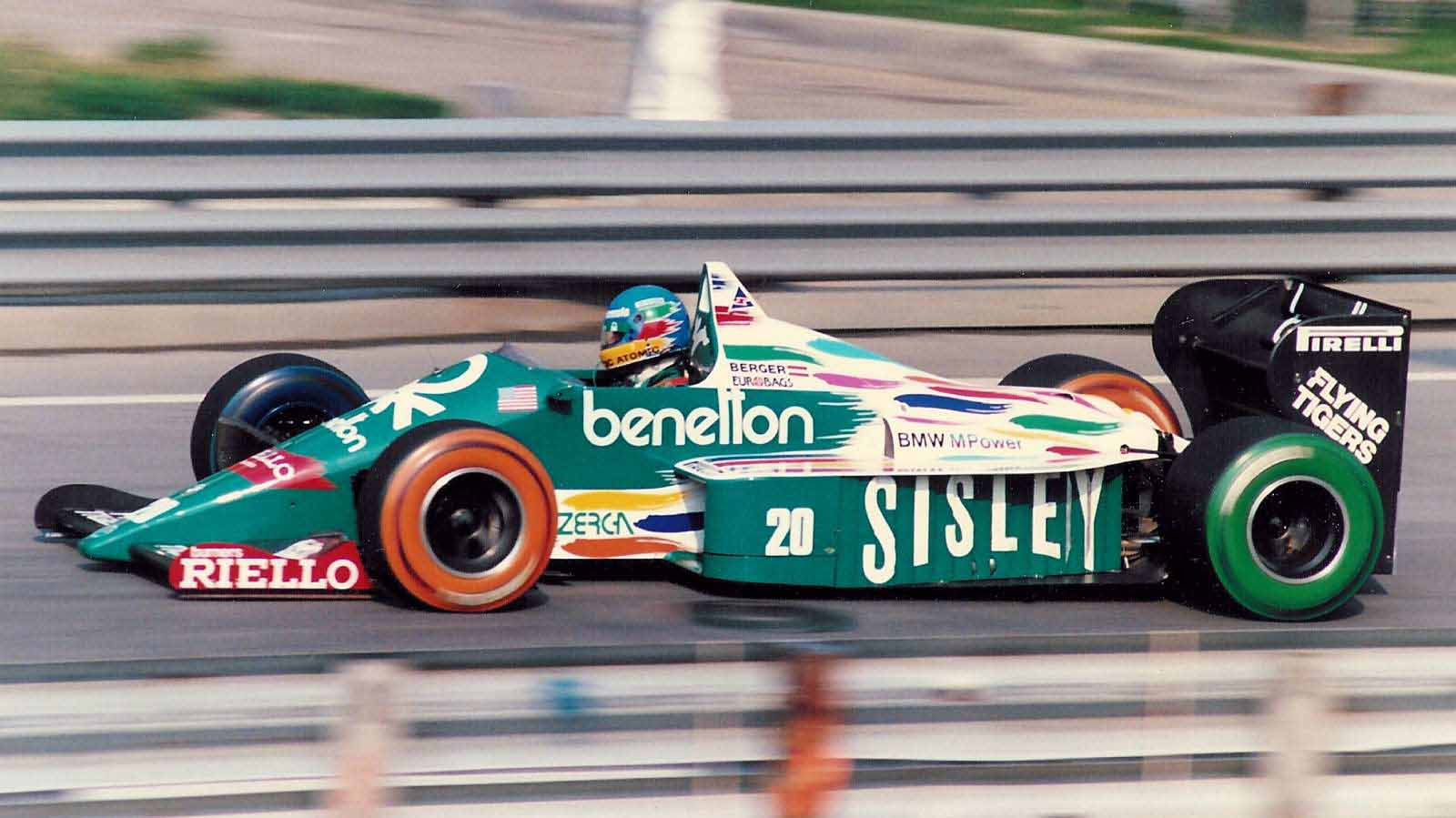
Benetton Formula made their entrance in F1.

- Two factory-backed constructors left Formula One after the 1985 season: Renault (only staying one more year as an engine supplier) and Alfa Romeo. Two other teams had already folded during the season: RAM and Spirit.
- The Toleman team was bought by the Benetton Group and renamed Benetton Formula.
- Shortly before the season began, Frank Williams was involved in a road accident in France that left him in a wheelchair. Technical director and part-owner Patrick Head would be forced to run the team in all departments, in addition to his design and engineering work.

==== Mid-season changes ====
- When entering the sport in 1985, Haas Lola encountered delays in the development of their first car, and the specially developed Ford-Cosworth V6 turbo was not ready either. So their first chassis was adjusted to be powered by a four-cylinder Hart turbo engine and could only make its debut in September. It was not until the third race of 1986 that the team could get delivery of the Cosworth engine and switch to their second car, specifically designed around it.
- The small French constructor AGS made their debut in the Italian Grand Prix. Their track record from F2 and F3000 was not particularly promising and the team had no more than seven employees. Their first F1 car existed of as many Renault parts as was legal, bolted onto an F3000 chassis. It was powered by a well-used Motori Moderni engine and driven by Ivan Capelli, while he was still on his way to become International F3000 champion.

=== Driver changes ===
- After triple world champion Niki Lauda retired, 1982 champion Keke Rosberg took his place at McLaren. Nelson Piquet, two world championships under his belt, took the opportunity to leave Brabham after seven seasons, and move to Williams.
- Elio de Angelis had chosen to leave Lotus, frustrated that the team's efforts were being focused mostly on Ayrton Senna. He was granted Piquet's seat at Brabham. Derek Warwick was originally signed to replace the Italian, but Senna gave his preference to Johnny Dumfries, British F3 champion and European F3 runner-up in 1984.
- A lot of other driver changes happened in the lower-ranking teams.

==== Mid-season changes ====
- Derek Warwick was left without a drive after the deal with Lotus fell through. He ended up at Brabham in May 1986, after De Angelis died following a fiery crash during private testing at Circuit Paul Ricard.
- In warm-up to the Canadian Grand Prix, Patrick Tambay, driving for Haas Lola, suffered suspension failure and a huge accident injured both his feet. Team owner Carl Haas tried to get 1978 world champion Mario Andretti as a replacement, but he declined and recommended his son Michael. When Michael was unable to obtain a FIA Superlicence, however, Haas turned to the experienced Eddie Cheever. Tambay returned for French Grand Prix.
- After fives races of the F1 season, Marc Surer suffered a serious accident when competing in the 1986 ADAC Hessen-Rallye. Christian Danner moved to Arrows to replace him. Danner's seat at Osella was filled by Allen Berg. It was the Canadian's debut, after talks with Arrows, Tyrrell, RAM and Spirit had not come to fruition. When his sponsorship money ran out, he was replaced at the Italian Grand Prix by Alex Caffi, granting him a debut at his home race, but further sponsorship did mean that Berg was able to see out the season.
- At the start of the British Grand Prix, Jacques Laffite was involved in a multi-car pile-up. He broke both legs and it ended his F1 career. Philippe Alliot returned to take his seat at Ligier, after driving two seasons for RAM.

== Calendar ==
Round	Grand Prix	Circuit	Date
1	Brazilian Grand Prix	(Brazil) Autódromo de Jacarepaguá, Rio de Janeiro	23 March
2	Spanish Grand Prix	(Spain) Circuito de Jerez, Jerez de la Frontera	13 April
3	San Marino Grand Prix	(Italy) Autodromo Dino Ferrari, Imola	27 April
4	Monaco Grand Prix	Circuit de Monaco, Monte Carlo	11 May
5	Belgian Grand Prix	(Belgium) Circuit de Spa-Francorchamps, Stavelot	25 May
6	Canadian Grand Prix	(Canada) Circuit Gilles Villeneuve, Montréal	15 June
7	Detroit Grand Prix	(United States) Detroit Street Circuit, Downtown Detroit, Michigan	22 June
8	French Grand Prix	(France) Circuit Paul Ricard, Le Castellet	6 July
9	British Grand Prix	(United Kingdom) Brands Hatch, West Kingsdown	13 July
10	German Grand Prix	(West Germany) Hockenheimring, Hockenheim	27 July
11	Hungarian Grand Prix	(Hungary) Hungaroring, Mogyoród	10 August
12	Austrian Grand Prix	(Austria) Österreichring, Spielberg	17 August
13	Italian Grand Prix	(Italy) Autodromo Nazionale di Monza, Monza	7 September
14	Portuguese Grand Prix	(Portugal) Autódromo do Estoril, Estoril	21 September
15	Mexican Grand Prix	Autódromo Hermanos Rodríguez, Mexico City	12 October
16	Australian Grand Prix	(Australia) Adelaide Street Circuit, Adelaide	26 October

=== Calendar changes ===
- The Spanish Grand Prix returned to the calendar for the first time in five years and was held at the newly built Circuito de Jerez. (In 1984 and 1985, Formula One had tried to stage the race in Fuengirola.) The owners of the Jarama circuit tried to get the slot of the European Grand Prix, but were unsuccessful.
- The Belgian Grand Prix was moved up to May to avoid the chance of hot and dry weather, after the asphalt broke up in practice for the 1985 edition under the immense power of the cars.
- The British Grand Prix was moved from Silverstone to Brands Hatch, in keeping with the event-sharing arrangement between the two circuits. The 1986 British Grand Prix would be the last at Brands Hatch, as from 1987, it would be permanently held at Silverstone (under FISA's "one country, one circuit" rule).
- The German Grand Prix returned to the Hockenheimring after using the Nürburgring for 1985, and would be permanently held at Hockenheim (again, "one country, one circuit").
- The Hungarian Grand Prix was organised for the first time. It was the first F1 race to take place behind the Iron Curtain.
- The Portuguese Grand Prix was moved back to September.
- The Mexican Grand Prix returned for the first time since 1970. The Autódromo Hermanos Rodríguez in Mexico City was upgraded to a new layout to improve safety. (The race was originally supposed to return in 1985 but was cancelled due to the 1985 Mexico City earthquake.)

==== Provisional calendar ====
An early version of the calendar showed 20 races. These rounds were eventually removed:

Grand Prix	Circuit	Date
Argentine Grand Prix	(Argentina) Autódromo de Buenos Aires, Buenos Aires	9 March
Japanese Grand Prix	(Japan) Suzuka International Racing Course, Suzuka City	6 April
Dutch Grand Prix	(Netherlands) Circuit Park Zandvoort, Zandvoort	31 August
South African Grand Prix	(South Africa) Kyalami Circuit, Midrand	26 October

- An attempt was made to revive the Argentine Grand Prix at the Autódromo de Buenos Aires to be held on 9 March as Round 1. This was unsuccessful due to lack of sponsorship and no Argentinian driver competing in the championship.
- The Japanese Grand Prix, originally scheduled for 6 April, was cancelled as rebuilding parts of the Suzuka International Racing Course were too time-consuming. The race would only return the following year in a completely renovated Suzuka.
- Detroit was originally due to be replaced by the return of the US Grand Prix in name to be held at Road America in Elkhart Lake Wisconsin but terms could not be agreed which meant that the race returned to Detroit.
- The Dutch Grand Prix, originally scheduled for 31 August, was dropped after the owners, CENAV (Circuit Exploitatie Nederlandse Autorensport Vereniging), went out of business. It was replaced by the Hungarian Grand Prix.
- The South African Grand Prix, originally scheduled for 26 October, was dropped because of apartheid. FISA banned all events in South Africa until 1992.
- In the provisional calendar, the Swedish Grand Prix was earmarked to return for the first time since 1978 and was scheduled for 14 September (later than the original June slot it had between 1973 and 1978), the Italian Grand Prix was to take place on 28 September, Portuguese Grand Prix was to take place on 12 October, Mexican Grand Prix on 9 November and Australian Grand Prix on 23 November as the final round. All 4 were moved ahead when the Dutch, Swedish and South African rounds fell through.

== Regulation changes ==
=== Background ===
Back in 1980, Renault proved that turbocharged engines were the way to success and by the half-way point in the 1985 season, all teams had followed their example. The FIA saw that the power output from turbo engines had doubled in the past six years. The 1986 F1 cars in qualifying trim proved to be the most powerful Grand Prix cars in history. Manufacturers mentioned numbers above 1,400 bhp (1,000 kW), powering cars that weighed just 540 kg (1,190 lb) giving a staggering power-to-weight ratio of 2,500 hp/ton. This power output was only seen in qualifying trim, since the specially prepared engines, tyres and gearboxes could only hold on for two to four laps under this immense force before destroying themselves, and in race trim, with the engines limited in power to conserve them to run a 190-mile (306 km) race distance, the cars were not much slower.

So after mandating turbocharged engines for 1986, the governing body decided to re-allow naturally aspirated engines for 1987, and at the same time started reining in the power of turbo engines, before banning them altogether for the 1989 season.

=== Technical regulations ===
- 1.5 litre turbocharged engines compulsory (with unlimited number of cylinders, RPM and power output).
- Fuel use during the race was limited from 220 L (58 US gal) to 195 L (52 US gal). This led to fuel saving playing a major role in team strategy during the season.

=== Event regulations ===
- Catch-fencing was banned.
- After the accident and death of Elio de Angelis in testing, a permanent team of professional firefighters, FIA medical service inspector and medevac helicopter were made mandatory at all testing and race events.

== Season report ==
In Sky TV's "Tales from the crypt" Mansell said that at the end of year FIA Paris prizegiving, Bertie Martin, the Clerk of the Course at Adelaide, told him that had he hit the wall and debris covered the track, he would have red-flagged the race and, as two thirds race distance had been completed, Mansell would have been world champion.

== Results and standings ==
=== Grands Prix ===
The 1986 Formula One World Championship was contested over a sixteen-race series.

Round	Grand Prix	Pole position	Fastest lap	Winning driver	Winning constructor	Report
1	(Brazil) Brazilian Grand Prix	(Brazil) Ayrton Senna	(Brazil) Nelson Piquet	(Brazil) Nelson Piquet	(United Kingdom) Williams-Honda	Report
2	(Spain) Spanish Grand Prix	(Brazil) Ayrton Senna	(United Kingdom) Nigel Mansell	(Brazil) Ayrton Senna	(United Kingdom) Lotus-Renault	Report
3	(Italy) San Marino Grand Prix	(Brazil) Ayrton Senna	(Brazil) Nelson Piquet	(France) Alain Prost	(United Kingdom) McLaren-TAG	Report
4	Monaco Grand Prix	(France) Alain Prost	(France) Alain Prost	(France) Alain Prost	(United Kingdom) McLaren-TAG	Report
5	(Belgium) Belgian Grand Prix	(Brazil) Nelson Piquet	(France) Alain Prost	(United Kingdom) Nigel Mansell	(United Kingdom) Williams-Honda	Report
6	(Canada) Canadian Grand Prix	(United Kingdom) Nigel Mansell	(Brazil) Nelson Piquet	(United Kingdom) Nigel Mansell	(United Kingdom) Williams-Honda	Report
7	(United States) Detroit Grand Prix	(Brazil) Ayrton Senna	(Brazil) Nelson Piquet	(Brazil) Ayrton Senna	(United Kingdom) Lotus-Renault	Report
8	(France) French Grand Prix	(Brazil) Ayrton Senna	(United Kingdom) Nigel Mansell	(United Kingdom) Nigel Mansell	(United Kingdom) Williams-Honda	Report
9	(United Kingdom) British Grand Prix	(Brazil) Nelson Piquet	(United Kingdom) Nigel Mansell	(United Kingdom) Nigel Mansell	(United Kingdom) Williams-Honda	Report
10	(West Germany) German Grand Prix	(Finland) Keke Rosberg	(Austria) Gerhard Berger	(Brazil) Nelson Piquet	(United Kingdom) Williams-Honda	Report
11	(Hungary) Hungarian Grand Prix	(Brazil) Ayrton Senna	(Brazil) Nelson Piquet	(Brazil) Nelson Piquet	(United Kingdom) Williams-Honda	Report
12	(Austria) Austrian Grand Prix	(Italy) Teo Fabi	(Austria) Gerhard Berger	(France) Alain Prost	(United Kingdom) McLaren-TAG	Report
13	(Italy) Italian Grand Prix	(Italy) Teo Fabi	(Italy) Teo Fabi	(Brazil) Nelson Piquet	(United Kingdom) Williams-Honda	Report
14	(Portugal) Portuguese Grand Prix	(Brazil) Ayrton Senna	(United Kingdom) Nigel Mansell	(United Kingdom) Nigel Mansell	(United Kingdom) Williams-Honda	Report
15	(Mexico) Mexican Grand Prix	(Brazil) Ayrton Senna	(Brazil) Nelson Piquet	(Austria) Gerhard Berger	(United Kingdom) Benetton-BMW	Report
16	(Australia) Australian Grand Prix	(United Kingdom) Nigel Mansell	(Brazil) Nelson Piquet	(France) Alain Prost	(United Kingdom) McLaren-TAG	Report

=== Scoring system ===
Points were awarded to the top six classified finishers. For the Drivers' Championship, the best eleven results were counted, while, for the Constructors' Championship, all rounds were counted.

Numbers without parentheses are championship points; numbers in parentheses are total points scored. Points were awarded in the following system:

Position	1st	2nd	3rd	4th	5th	6th
Race	9	6	4	3	2	1

=== World Drivers' Championship standings ===
Pos	Driver	BRA (Brazil)	ESP (Spain)	SMR (Italy)	MON (Monaco)	BEL (Belgium)	CAN (Canada)	DET (United States)	FRA (France)	GBR (United Kingdom)	GER (West Germany)	HUN (Hungary)	AUT (Austria)	ITA (Italy)	POR (Portugal)	MEX (Mexico)	AUS (Australia)	Points
1	(France) Alain Prost	Ret	3	1	1^{P}^{F}	(6)^{F}	2	3	2	3	(6)^{†}	Ret	1	DSQ	2	2	1	72 (74)
2	(United Kingdom) Nigel Mansell	Ret	2^{F}	Ret	4	1	1^{P}	5	1^{F}	1^{F}	3	3	Ret	2	1^{F}	(5)	Ret^{P}	70 (72)
3	(Brazil) Nelson Piquet	1^{F}	Ret	2^{F}	7	Ret^{P}	3^{F}	Ret^{F}	3	2^{P}	1	1^{F}	Ret	1	3	4^{F}	2^{F}	69
4	(Brazil) Ayrton Senna	2^{P}	1^{P}	Ret^{P}	3	2	5	1^{P}	Ret^{P}	Ret	2	2^{P}	Ret	Ret	4^{P}^{†}	3^{P}	Ret	55
5	(Sweden) Stefan Johansson	Ret	Ret	4	10	3	Ret	Ret	Ret	Ret	11^{†}	4	3	3	6	12^{†}	3	23
6	(Finland) Keke Rosberg	Ret	4	5^{†}	2	Ret	4	Ret	4	Ret	5^{P}^{†}	Ret	9^{†}	4	Ret	Ret	Ret	22
7	(Austria) Gerhard Berger	6	6	3	Ret	10	Ret	Ret	Ret	Ret	10^{F}	Ret	7^{F}	5	Ret	1	Ret	17
8	(France) Jacques Laffite	3	Ret	Ret	6	5	7	2	6	Ret								14
9	(Italy) Michele Alboreto	Ret	Ret	10^{†}	Ret	4	8	4	8	Ret	Ret	Ret	2	Ret	5	Ret	Ret	14
10	(France) René Arnoux	4	Ret	Ret	5	Ret	6	Ret	5	4	4	Ret	10	Ret	7	15^{†}	7	14
11	(United Kingdom) Martin Brundle	5	Ret	8	Ret	Ret	9	Ret	10	5	Ret	6	Ret	10	Ret	11	4	8
12	(Australia) Alan Jones	Ret	Ret	Ret	Ret	11^{†}	10	Ret	Ret	Ret	9	Ret	4	6	Ret	Ret	Ret	4
13	(United Kingdom) Johnny Dumfries	9	Ret	Ret	DNQ	Ret	Ret	7	Ret	7	Ret	5	Ret	Ret	9	Ret	6	3
14	(France) Philippe Streiff	7	Ret	Ret	11	12	11	9	Ret	6	Ret	8	Ret	9	Ret	Ret	5^{†}	3
15	(France) Patrick Tambay	Ret	8	Ret	Ret	Ret	DNS		Ret	Ret	8	7	5	Ret	NC	Ret	NC	2
16	(Italy) Teo Fabi	10	5	Ret	Ret	7	Ret	Ret	Ret	Ret	Ret	Ret	Ret^{P}	Ret^{P}^{F}	8	Ret	10	2
17	(Italy) Riccardo Patrese	Ret	Ret	6^{†}	Ret	8	Ret	6	7	Ret	Ret	Ret	Ret	Ret	Ret	13^{†}	Ret	2
18	(West Germany) Christian Danner	Ret	Ret	Ret	DNQ	Ret	Ret	Ret	11	Ret	Ret	Ret	6	8	11	9	Ret	1
19	(France) Philippe Alliot										Ret	9	Ret	Ret	Ret	6	8	1
—	(Belgium) Thierry Boutsen	Ret	7	7	8	Ret	Ret	Ret	NC	NC	Ret	Ret	Ret	7	10	7	Ret	0
—	(United Kingdom) Derek Warwick						Ret	10	9	8	7	Ret	DNS	Ret	Ret	Ret	Ret	0
—	(United Kingdom) Jonathan Palmer	Ret	Ret	Ret	12	13	Ret	8	Ret	9	Ret	10	Ret	Ret	12	10^{†}	9	0
—	(Netherlands) Huub Rothengatter			Ret	DNQ	Ret	12	DNS	Ret	Ret	Ret	Ret	8	Ret	Ret	DNS	Ret	0
—	(Italy) Andrea de Cesaris	Ret	Ret	Ret	DNQ	Ret	Ret	Ret	Ret	Ret	Ret	Ret	Ret	Ret	Ret	8	Ret	0
—	(Italy) Elio de Angelis	8	Ret	Ret	Ret													0
—	(Switzerland) Marc Surer	Ret	Ret	9	9	9												0
—	(Italy) Piercarlo Ghinzani	Ret	Ret	Ret	DNQ	Ret	Ret	Ret	Ret	Ret	Ret	Ret	11	Ret	Ret	Ret	Ret	0
—	(Canada) Allen Berg							Ret	Ret	Ret	12	Ret	Ret		13	16	NC	0
—	(Italy) Alessandro Nannini	Ret	DNS	Ret	DNQ	Ret	Ret	Ret	Ret	Ret	Ret	Ret	Ret	Ret	Ret	14	Ret	0
—	(Italy) Alex Caffi													NC				0
—	(Italy) Ivan Capelli													Ret	Ret			0
—	(United States) Eddie Cheever							Ret										0
Pos	Driver	BRA (Brazil)	ESP (Spain)	SMR (Italy)	MON (Monaco)	BEL (Belgium)	CAN (Canada)	DET (United States)	FRA (France)	GBR (United Kingdom)	GER (West Germany)	HUN (Hungary)	AUT (Austria)	ITA (Italy)	POR (Portugal)	MEX (Mexico)	AUS (Australia)	Points

Key
Colour	Result
Gold	Winner
Silver	Second place
Bronze	Third place
Green	Other points position
Blue	Other classified position
Blue	Not classified, finished (NC)
Purple	Not classified, retired (Ret)
Red	Did not qualify (DNQ)
Black	Disqualified (DSQ)
White	Did not start (DNS)
White	Race cancelled (C)
Blank	Did not practice (DNP)
Blank	Excluded (EX)
Blank	Did not arrive (DNA)
Blank	Withdrawn (WD)
Blank	Did not enter (empty cell)
Annotation	Meaning
P	Pole position
F	Fastest lap

^{†} Driver did not finish the Grand Prix, but was classified as he completed over 90% of the race distance.

=== World Constructors' Championship standings ===
Pos	Manufacturer	No.	BRA (Brazil)	ESP (Spain)	SMR (Italy)	MON (Monaco)	BEL (Belgium)	CAN (Canada)	DET (United States)	FRA (France)	GBR (United Kingdom)	GER (West Germany)	HUN (Hungary)	AUT (Austria)	ITA (Italy)	POR (Portugal)	MEX (Mexico)	AUS (Australia)	Pts
1	(United Kingdom) Williams-Honda	5	Ret	2^{F}	Ret	4	1	1^{P}	5	1^{F}	1^{F}	3	3	Ret	2	1^{F}	5	Ret^{P}	141
1	(United Kingdom) Williams-Honda	6	1^{F}	Ret	2^{F}	7	Ret^{P}	3^{F}	Ret^{F}	3	2^{P}	1	1^{F}	Ret	1	3	4^{F}	2^{F}	141
2	(United Kingdom) McLaren-TAG	1	Ret	3	1	1^{P}^{F}	6^{F}	2	3	2	3	6^{†}	Ret	1	DSQ	2	2	1	96
2	(United Kingdom) McLaren-TAG	2	Ret	4	5^{†}	2	Ret	4	Ret	4	Ret	5^{P}^{†}	Ret	9^{†}	4	Ret	Ret	Ret	96
3	(United Kingdom) Lotus-Renault	11	9	Ret	Ret	DNQ	Ret	Ret	7	Ret	7	Ret	5	Ret	Ret	9	Ret	6	58
3	(United Kingdom) Lotus-Renault	12	2^{P}	1^{P}	Ret^{P}	3	2	5	1^{P}	Ret^{P}	Ret	2	2^{P}	Ret	Ret	4^{P}^{†}	3^{P}	Ret	58
4	(Italy) Ferrari	27	Ret	Ret	10^{†}	Ret	4	8	4	8	Ret	Ret	Ret	2	Ret	5	Ret	Ret	37
4	(Italy) Ferrari	28	Ret	Ret	4	10	3	Ret	Ret	Ret	Ret	11^{†}	4	3	3	6	12^{†}	3	37
5	(France) Ligier-Renault	25	4	Ret	Ret	5	Ret	6	Ret	5	4	4	Ret	10	Ret	7	15^{†}	7	29
5	(France) Ligier-Renault	26	3	Ret	Ret	6	5	7	2	6	Ret	Ret	9	Ret	Ret	Ret	6	8	29
6	(United Kingdom) Benetton-BMW	19	10	5	Ret	Ret	7	Ret	Ret	Ret	Ret	Ret	Ret	Ret^{P}	Ret^{P}^{F}	8	Ret	10	19
6	(United Kingdom) Benetton-BMW	20	6	6	3	Ret	10	Ret	Ret	Ret	Ret	10^{F}	Ret	7^{F}	5	Ret	1	Ret	19
7	(United Kingdom) Tyrrell-Renault	3	5	Ret	8	Ret	Ret	9	Ret	10	5	Ret	6	Ret	10	Ret	11	4	11
7	(United Kingdom) Tyrrell-Renault	4	7	Ret	Ret	11	12	11	9	Ret	6	Ret	8	Ret	9	Ret	Ret	5^{†}	11
8	(United States) Lola-Ford	15			Ret	Ret	11^{†}	10	Ret	Ret	Ret	9	Ret	4	6	Ret	Ret	Ret	6
8	(United States) Lola-Ford	16				Ret	Ret	DNS	Ret	Ret	Ret	8	7	5	Ret	NC	Ret	NC	6
9	(United Kingdom) Brabham-BMW	7	Ret	Ret	6^{†}	Ret	8	Ret	6	7	Ret	Ret	Ret	Ret	Ret	Ret	13^{†}	Ret	2
9	(United Kingdom) Brabham-BMW	8	8	Ret	Ret	Ret		Ret	10	9	8	7	Ret	DNS	Ret	Ret	Ret	Ret	2
10	(United Kingdom) Arrows-BMW	17	Ret	Ret	9	9	9		Ret	11	Ret	Ret	Ret	6	8	11	9	Ret	1
10	(United Kingdom) Arrows-BMW	18	Ret	7	7	8	Ret	Ret	Ret	NC	NC	Ret	Ret	Ret	7	10	7	Ret	1
—	(West Germany) Zakspeed	14	Ret	Ret	Ret	12	13	Ret	8	Ret	9	Ret	10	Ret	Ret	12	10^{†}	9	0
—	(West Germany) Zakspeed	29			Ret	DNQ	Ret	12	DNS	Ret	Ret	Ret	Ret	8	Ret	Ret	DNS	Ret	0
—	(Italy) Minardi-Motori Moderni	23	Ret	Ret	Ret	DNQ	Ret	Ret	Ret	Ret	Ret	Ret	Ret	Ret	Ret	Ret	8	Ret	0
—	(Italy) Minardi-Motori Moderni	24	Ret	DNS	Ret	DNQ	Ret	Ret	Ret	Ret	Ret	Ret	Ret	Ret	Ret	Ret	14	Ret	0
—	(United States) Lola-Hart	15	Ret	Ret															0
—	(United States) Lola-Hart	16	Ret	8	Ret														0
—	(Italy) Osella-Alfa Romeo	21	Ret	Ret	Ret	DNQ	Ret	Ret	Ret	Ret	Ret	Ret	Ret	11	Ret	Ret	Ret	Ret	0
—	(Italy) Osella-Alfa Romeo	22	Ret	Ret	Ret	DNQ	Ret	Ret	Ret	Ret	Ret	12	Ret	Ret	NC	13	16	NC	0
—	(France) AGS-Motori Moderni	31													Ret	Ret			0
Pos	Constructor	Car no.	BRA (Brazil)	ESP (Spain)	SMR (Italy)	MON (Monaco)	BEL (Belgium)	CAN (Canada)	DET (United States)	FRA (France)	GBR (United Kingdom)	GER (West Germany)	HUN (Hungary)	AUT (Austria)	ITA (Italy)	POR (Portugal)	MEX (Mexico)	AUS (Australia)	Pts

Key
Colour	Result
Gold	Winner
Silver	Second place
Bronze	Third place
Green	Other points position
Blue	Other classified position
Blue	Not classified, finished (NC)
Purple	Not classified, retired (Ret)
Red	Did not qualify (DNQ)
Black	Disqualified (DSQ)
White	Did not start (DNS)
White	Race cancelled (C)
Blank	Did not practice (DNP)
Blank	Excluded (EX)
Blank	Did not arrive (DNA)
Blank	Withdrawn (WD)
Blank	Did not enter (empty cell)
Annotation	Meaning
P	Pole position
F	Fastest lap

^{†} Car did not finish the Grand Prix, but was classified as it completed over 90% of the race distance.
