= 1986 French Grand Prix =

- Race 8 of 16 in the 1986 Formula One World Championship
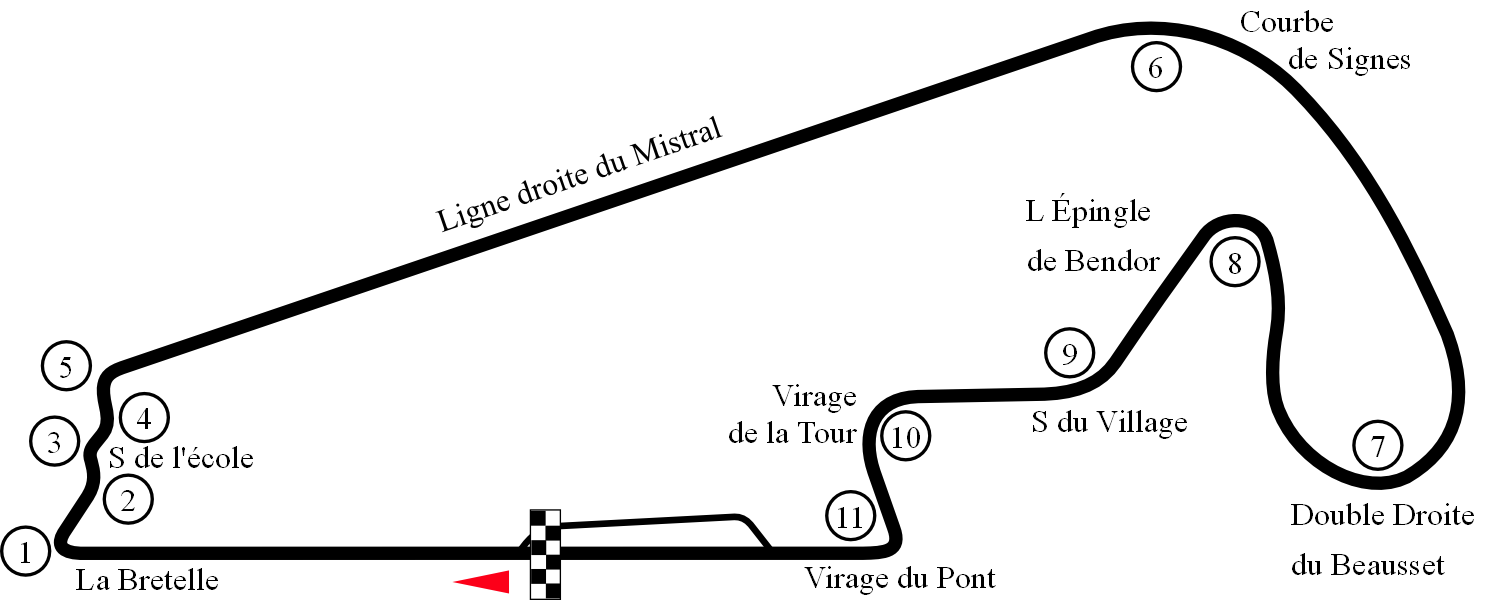

Race details
- Date: 6 July 1986
- Official name: 72e Grand Prix de France
- Location: Circuit Paul Ricard; Le Castellet, Var, France
- Course: Permanent racing facility
- Course length: 3.812 km (2.369 miles)
- Distance: 80 laps, 304.960 km (189.493 miles)
- Weather: Dry

Pole position
Driver	(Brazil) Ayrton Senna	Lotus-Renault
- Time: 1:06.526

Fastest lap
Driver	(United Kingdom) Nigel Mansell	Williams-Honda
- Time: 1:09.993 on lap 57

Podium
First	(United Kingdom) Nigel Mansell	Williams-Honda
Second	(France) Alain Prost	McLaren-TAG
Third	(Brazil) Nelson Piquet	Williams-Honda

The 1986 French Grand Prix was a Formula One motor race held at Paul Ricard on 6 July 1986. It was the eighth race of the 1986 Formula One World Championship.

Following Elio de Angelis's fatal testing crash on the full 5.81-kilometre (3.61 mi) circuit two months previously, a decision was made to use the shorter, 3.812-kilometre (2.369 mi) "Club" circuit for this race and for future F1 races (up to and including 1990). This eliminated the high-speed Verrerie bends, where de Angelis had crashed, and reduced the length of the Mistral straight from 1.8 km (1.1 mi) to 1 km (0.62 mi). Nonetheless, the cars still recorded speeds of over 330 km/h (205 mph) on the straight.

The 80-lap race was won by Nigel Mansell, driving a Williams-Honda. It was Mansell's third victory of the season. Alain Prost finished second in a McLaren-TAG, with Nelson Piquet third in the other Williams-Honda. Ayrton Senna took pole position in his Lotus-Renault, but crashed at Signes early in the race after sliding on oil laid by Andrea de Cesaris's failed Minardi.

This race marked Scuderia Ferrari's 400th start in a World Championship event as a team.

== Classification ==
=== Qualifying ===
Pos	No	Driver	Constructor	Q1	Q2	Gap
1	12	(Brazil) Ayrton Senna	Lotus-Renault	1:06.526	1:06.807	
2	5	(United Kingdom) Nigel Mansell	Williams-Honda	1:06.755	1:09.899	+0.229
3	6	(Brazil) Nelson Piquet	Williams-Honda	1:06.797	1:07.184	+0.271
4	25	(France) René Arnoux	Ligier-Renault	1:07.114	1:07.075	+0.549
5	1	(France) Alain Prost	McLaren-TAG	1:07.270	1:07.266	+0.740
6	27	(Italy) Michele Alboreto	Ferrari	1:07.365	1:09.161	+0.839
7	2	(Finland) Keke Rosberg	McLaren-TAG	1:07.545	1:08.175	+1.019
8	20	(Austria) Gerhard Berger	Benetton-BMW	1:07.835	1:07.554	+1.028
9	19	(Italy) Teo Fabi	Benetton-BMW	1:08.703	1:07.818	+1.292
10	28	(Sweden) Stefan Johansson	Ferrari	1:07.874	1:08.881	+1.348
11	26	(France) Jacques Laffite	Ligier-Renault	1:07.913	1:08.288	+1.387
12	11	(United Kingdom) Johnny Dumfries	Lotus-Renault	1:09.477	1:08.544	+2.018
13	16	(France) Patrick Tambay	Lola-Ford	1:09.108	1:08.616	+2.090
14	8	(United Kingdom) Derek Warwick	Brabham-BMW	1:09.471	1:08.905	+2.379
15	3	(United Kingdom) Martin Brundle	Tyrrell-Renault	1:09.044	1:10.293	+2.518
16	7	(Italy) Riccardo Patrese	Brabham-BMW	1:09.624	1:09.436	+2.910
17	4	(France) Philippe Streiff	Tyrrell-Renault	1:09.935	1:09.700	+3.174
18	17	(West Germany) Christian Danner	Arrows-BMW	1:09.737	1:10.614	+3.211
19	24	(Italy) Alessandro Nannini	Minardi-Motori Moderni	1:09.792	1:10.630	+3.266
20	15	(Australia) Alan Jones	Lola-Ford	1:09.929	1:10.733	+3.403
21	18	(Belgium) Thierry Boutsen	Arrows-BMW	1:09.987	1:28.882	+3.461
22	14	(United Kingdom) Jonathan Palmer	Zakspeed	1:10.305	1:10.511	+3.779
23	23	(Italy) Andrea de Cesaris	Minardi-Motori Moderni	1:11.483	1:21.859	+4.957
24	29	(Netherlands) Huub Rothengatter	Zakspeed	1:12.940	1:12.163	+5.637
25	21	(Italy) Piercarlo Ghinzani	Osella-Alfa Romeo	1:14.496	1:12.443	+5.917
26	22	(Canada) Allen Berg	Osella-Alfa Romeo	1:18.866	1:14.264	+7.738

=== Race ===
Pos	No	Driver	Constructor	Laps	Time/Retired	Grid	Points
1	5	(United Kingdom) Nigel Mansell	Williams-Honda	80	1:37:19.272	2	9
2	1	(France) Alain Prost	McLaren-TAG	80	+ 17.128	5	6
3	6	(Brazil) Nelson Piquet	Williams-Honda	80	+ 37.545	3	4
4	2	(Finland) Keke Rosberg	McLaren-TAG	80	+ 48.703	7	3
5	25	(France) René Arnoux	Ligier-Renault	79	+ 1 Lap	4	2
6	26	(France) Jacques Laffite	Ligier-Renault	79	+ 1 Lap	11	1
7	7	(Italy) Riccardo Patrese	Brabham-BMW	78	+ 2 Laps	16	
8	27	(Italy) Michele Alboreto	Ferrari	78	+ 2 Laps	6	
9	8	(United Kingdom) Derek Warwick	Brabham-BMW	77	+ 3 Laps	14	
10	3	(United Kingdom) Martin Brundle	Tyrrell-Renault	77	+ 3 Laps	15	
11	17	(Germany) Christian Danner	Arrows-BMW	76	+ 4 Laps	18	
NC	18	(Belgium) Thierry Boutsen	Arrows-BMW	67	+ 13 Laps	21	
Ret	16	(France) Patrick Tambay	Lola-Ford	64	Brakes	13	
Ret	11	(United Kingdom) Johnny Dumfries	Lotus-Renault	56	Engine	12	
Ret	14	(United Kingdom) Jonathan Palmer	Zakspeed	46	Engine	22	
Ret	4	(France) Philippe Streiff	Tyrrell-Renault	43	Fire	17	
Ret	29	(Netherlands) Huub Rothengatter	Zakspeed	32	Accident	24	
Ret	22	(Canada) Allen Berg	Osella-Alfa Romeo	25	Turbo	26	
Ret	20	(Austria) Gerhard Berger	Benetton-BMW	22	Gearbox	8	
Ret	19	(Italy) Teo Fabi	Benetton-BMW	7	Engine	9	
Ret	28	(Sweden) Stefan Johansson	Ferrari	5	Turbo	10	
Ret	12	(Brazil) Ayrton Senna	Lotus-Renault	3	Accident	1	
Ret	21	(Italy) Piercarlo Ghinzani	Osella-Alfa Romeo	3	Accident	25	
Ret	24	(Italy) Alessandro Nannini	Minardi-Motori Moderni	3	Accident	19	
Ret	23	(Italy) Andrea de Cesaris	Minardi-Motori Moderni	3	Turbo	23	
Ret	15	(Australia) Alan Jones	Lola-Ford	2	Accident	20	

== Championship standings after the race ==
Drivers' Championship standings

Pos	Driver	Points
1	(France) Alain Prost	39
2	(United Kingdom) Nigel Mansell	38
3	(Brazil) Ayrton Senna	36
4	(Brazil) Nelson Piquet	23
5	(Finland) Keke Rosberg	17

Constructors' Championship standings

Pos	Constructor	Points
1	(United Kingdom) Williams-Honda	61
2	(United Kingdom) McLaren-TAG	56
3	(United Kingdom) Lotus-Renault	36
4	(France) Ligier-Renault	22
5	(Italy) Ferrari	13

- Note: Only the top five positions are included for both sets of standings.

Previous race: 1986 Detroit Grand Prix	FIA Formula One World Championship; 1986 season	Next race: 1986 British Grand Prix
Previous race: 1985 French Grand Prix	French Grand Prix	Next race: 1987 French Grand Prix
