= 1986 Detroit Grand Prix =

- Race 7 of 16 in the 1986 Formula One World Championship

Race details
- Date: June 22, 1986
- Official name: 5th Detroit Grand Prix
- Location: Detroit Street Circuit; Detroit, Michigan
- Course: Temporary street course
- Course length: 4.120 km (2.56 miles)
- Distance: 63 laps, 259.56 km (161.28 miles)
- Weather: Cloudy and hot with temperatures reaching up to 91 °F (33 °C); wind speeds up to 23 miles per hour (37 km/h)

Pole position
Driver	(Brazil) Ayrton Senna	Lotus-Renault
- Time: 1:38.301

Fastest lap
Driver	(Brazil) Nelson Piquet	Williams-Honda
- Time: 1:41.233 on lap 41

Podium
First	(Brazil) Ayrton Senna	Lotus-Renault
Second	(France) Jacques Laffite	Ligier-Renault
Third	(France) Alain Prost	McLaren-TAG

The 1986 Detroit Grand Prix was a Formula One motor race held on June 22, 1986, in Detroit, Michigan.

== Summary ==
Lotus-Renault star Ayrton Senna started on the pole and came away with a hard-earned win, the fourth of his career. The young Brazilian charged through the field after dropping to eighth with a deflating tire for his first USGP victory. The race saw six lead changes among five drivers, and the victory for Senna began a streak that would see him take five United States Grand Prix wins in six years.

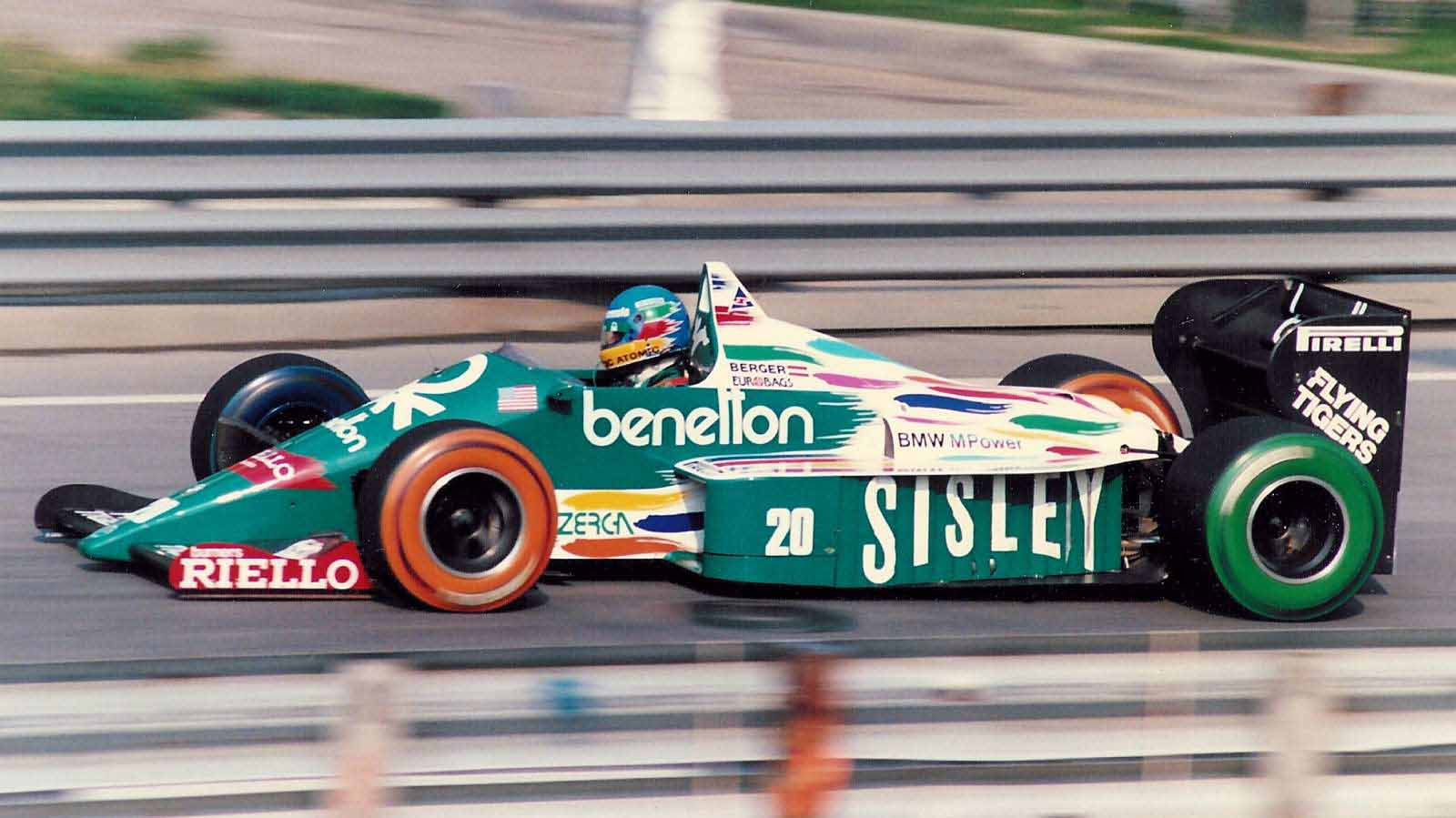
Gerhard Berger driving for Benetton at the race.

American Eddie Cheever, in his only F1 race of the season, was taking Patrick Tambay's seat in the Carl Haas Lola, as Tambay had not fully recovered from his Montreal injuries. Haas had attempted to get the legendary Mario Andretti, but, apparently because of a FISA-CART feud, Andretti's application for an FIA Super Licence was denied (allegedly Haas then tried for Michael Andretti on Mario's suggestion but his bid for the license was also denied). Cheever, who was racing in the 1986 World Sportscar Championship for the TWR Jaguar team, already had the required licence and had no such issues qualified tenth, out-qualifying temporary teammate Alan Jones by almost 3 seconds. His race ended at just over half-distance with a broken wheel peg.

As expected, the drivers had difficulty finding grip in Friday's sessions, as the temporary street circuit needed time to get some rubber down. Williams-Honda driver Nigel Mansell was the only one under 1:40, putting in two outstanding laps on race tires. On a gorgeous Saturday, Mansell and Senna bided their time, waiting until halfway through the one-hour session to take the track. Senna came out on qualifiers, managed to get a clear track, and clocked a course record 1:38.301. Mansell was balked on his run on the fragile qualifying tires when Alain Prost crashed in the chicane, and Senna had the pole by more than half a second.

Sunday was hot and humid with a chance of rain. At the start, Senna led Mansell into the first corner, and René Arnoux's Ligier-Renault jumped ahead of Nelson Piquet in the second Williams.

Beginning lap 3, Senna missed a gear entering Turn One, and Mansell's Williams shot by into the lead.

By the end of lap 5, Mansell's lead was 4.3 seconds, but that was as big as it got. His rear brake pads were too cool and had become glazed, and Senna was able to draw back up to him. By lap seven, he was right on his gearbox, and on lap 8, he retook the lead.

Senna immediately began to draw away, while Mansell slipped back through the field. On lap 14, with a 6.5 second lead, Senna suddenly ducked into the pits with a slowly deflating right rear tire. Despite a quick change, he re-entered in eighth place, twenty seconds behind the new leader, René Arnoux.

Arnoux held the lead for just three laps before having to pit for new rubber. His Ligier teammate Jacques Laffite, running with harder compound Pirelli rear tires, moved to the top of the score sheet. At age 42, it was Laffite's first time to lead a race in more than three years, and the last time in his career.

After his stop on lap 14, Senna had begun to carve his way back to the front, overtaking, not back markers, but the best drivers of the era. He passed the struggling Ferraris of Michele Alboreto on lap 15, and Stefan Johansson on lap 17. He then passed Arnoux when he made his tire stop on lap 18, Prost's McLaren-TAG on lap 28, and Mansell on lap 31. Piquet passed Laffite to become the race's fifth different leader. Senna reached second just 1.7 seconds behind Piquet by passing Laffite, who then pitted for tires.

With the two of them in front on their own, and Piquet leading by up to 3.5 seconds, Senna was content for the time being to follow his countryman. After eight laps in the lead, Piquet pitted for tires. Senna regained first place and then also pitted. Piquet's 18.4 second stop was even slower than teammate Mansell's had been, but when he returned to the track, the two-time champion got the bit between his teeth. Running second behind Senna, Piquet set the fastest lap of the race on lap 41, but with a pit stop ten seconds quicker than Piquet's, Senna was able to retain the lead.

On the very next lap, the 42nd, Piquet pushed a bit too much, and crashed hard at the left-hand corner before the last chicane. He ended up in the tire barrier, unhurt, but with his car in a very precarious position. The crane, present for just that reason, was unable to move the car. Arnoux, now 16.6 seconds behind in second, took a second a lap off Senna's lead for five laps while a yellow was displayed in the corner where Piquet had crashed. As soon as the yellow flag was gone, Arnoux went wide and hit Piquet's abandoned Williams! The Frenchman decided that his car was not damaged, and attempted to rejoin the field, but did so right in front of Thierry Boutsen's Arrows-BMW, sidelining both cars.

These three – Piquet, Arnoux and Boutsen – were the only drivers all afternoon to retire due to accidents.

With 17 laps to go, Senna led Prost by 27 seconds, but the McLaren's TAG engine was cutting out under braking. Laffite was able to close as Prost struggled, and quickly the Ligier moved by into second place. Senna came home 30 seconds in front for his first victory in the United States, and the only American win for the Renault.

== Classification ==
=== Qualifying ===
Pos	No	Driver	Constructor	Q1	Q2	Gap
1	12	(Brazil) Ayrton Senna	Lotus-Renault	1:40.301	1:38.301	—
2	5	(United Kingdom) Nigel Mansell	Williams-Honda	1:39.490	1:38.839	+0.538
3	6	(Brazil) Nelson Piquet	Williams-Honda	1:41.510	1:39.076	+0.775
4	25	(France) René Arnoux	Ligier-Renault	1:43.166	1:39.689	+1.388
5	28	(Sweden) Stefan Johansson	Ferrari	1:42.989	1:40.312	+2.011
6	26	(France) Jacques Laffite	Ligier-Renault	1:45.236	1:40.676	+2.375
7	1	(France) Alain Prost	McLaren-TAG	1:43.368	1:40.715	+2.414
8	7	(Italy) Riccardo Patrese	Brabham-BMW	1:43.664	1:40.819	+2.518
9	2	(Finland) Keke Rosberg	McLaren-TAG	1:43.732	1:40.848	+2.547
10	16	(United States) Eddie Cheever	Lola-Ford	1:46.499	1:41.540	+3.239
11	27	(Italy) Michele Alboreto	Ferrari	1:44.296	1:41.606	+3.305
12	20	(Austria) Gerhard Berger	Benetton-BMW	1:43.759	1:41.836	+3.535
13	18	(Belgium) Thierry Boutsen	Arrows-BMW	1:45.711	1:42.279	+3.978
14	11	(United Kingdom) Johnny Dumfries	Lotus-Renault	1:45.846	1:42.511	+4.210
15	8	(United Kingdom) Derek Warwick	Brabham-BMW	1:44.890	1:42.558	+4.257
16	3	(United Kingdom) Martin Brundle	Tyrrell-Renault	1:45.250	1:42.815	+4.514
17	19	(Italy) Teo Fabi	Benetton-BMW	1:48.912	1:43.658	+5.357
18	4	(France) Philippe Streiff	Tyrrell-Renault	1:47.478	1:43.796	+5.495
19	17	(West Germany) Christian Danner	Arrows-BMW	1:48.855	1:44.259	+5.958
20	14	(United Kingdom) Jonathan Palmer	Zakspeed	1:49.812	1:44.401	+6.100
21	15	(Australia) Alan Jones	Lola-Ford	1:45.521	1:44.450	+6.149
22	21	(Italy) Piercarlo Ghinzani	Osella-Alfa Romeo	1:49.067	1:45.059	+6.758
23	23	(Italy) Andrea de Cesaris	Minardi-Motori Moderni	1:47.359	1:46.705	+8.404
24	24	(Italy) Alessandro Nannini	Minardi-Motori Moderni	1:47.230	11:12.906	+8.929
25	22	(Canada) Allen Berg	Osella-Alfa Romeo	1:56.741	1:48.682	+10.381
26	29	(Netherlands) Huub Rothengatter	Zakspeed	1:49.680	29:44.015	+11.379

=== Race ===
Pos	No	Driver	Constructor	Tyre	Laps	Time/Retired	Grid	Points
1	12	(Brazil) Ayrton Senna	Lotus-Renault	G	63	1:51:12.847	1	9
2	26	(France) Jacques Laffite	Ligier-Renault	P	63	+ 31.017	6	6
3	1	(France) Alain Prost	McLaren-TAG	G	63	+ 31.824	7	4
4	27	(Italy) Michele Alboreto	Ferrari	G	63	+ 1:30.936	11	3
5	5	(United Kingdom) Nigel Mansell	Williams-Honda	G	62	+ 1 Lap	2	2
6	7	(Italy) Riccardo Patrese	Brabham-BMW	P	62	+ 1 Lap	8	1
7	11	(United Kingdom) Johnny Dumfries	Lotus-Renault	G	61	+ 2 Laps	14	
8	14	(United Kingdom) Jonathan Palmer	Zakspeed	G	61	+ 2 Laps	20	
9	4	(France) Philippe Streiff	Tyrrell-Renault	G	61	+ 2 Laps	18	
10	8	(United Kingdom) Derek Warwick	Brabham-BMW	P	60	+ 3 Laps	15	
Ret	17	(West Germany) Christian Danner	Arrows-BMW	G	51	Electrical	19	
Ret	25	(France) René Arnoux	Ligier-Renault	P	46	Accident	4	
Ret	18	(Belgium) Thierry Boutsen	Arrows-BMW	G	44	Accident	13	
Ret	23	(Italy) Andrea de Cesaris	Minardi-Motori Moderni	P	43	Gearbox	23	
Ret	6	(Brazil) Nelson Piquet	Williams-Honda	G	41	Accident	3	
Ret	28	(Sweden) Stefan Johansson	Ferrari	G	40	Electrical	5	
Ret	19	(Italy) Teo Fabi	Benetton-BMW	P	38	Gearbox	17	
Ret	16	(United States) Eddie Cheever	Lola-Ford	G	37	Steering	10	
Ret	15	(Australia) Alan Jones	Lola-Ford	G	33	Steering	21	
Ret	22	(Canada) Allen Berg	Osella-Alfa Romeo	P	28	Electrical	25	
Ret	3	(United Kingdom) Martin Brundle	Tyrrell-Renault	G	15	Electrical	16	
Ret	21	(Italy) Piercarlo Ghinzani	Osella-Alfa Romeo	P	14	Turbo	22	
Ret	2	(Finland) Keke Rosberg	McLaren-TAG	G	12	Transmission	9	
Ret	20	(Austria) Gerhard Berger	Benetton-BMW	P	8	Engine	12	
Ret	24	(Italy) Alessandro Nannini	Minardi-Motori Moderni	P	3	Turbo	24	
DNS	29	(Netherlands) Huub Rothengatter	Zakspeed	G	0	Electrical	26	

== Championship standings after the race ==
Drivers' Championship standings

Pos	Driver	Points
1	(Brazil) Ayrton Senna	36
2	(France) Alain Prost	33
3	(United Kingdom) Nigel Mansell	29
4	(Brazil) Nelson Piquet	19
5	(Finland) Keke Rosberg	14

Constructors' Championship standings

Pos	Constructor	Points
1	(United Kingdom) Williams-Honda	48
2	(United Kingdom) McLaren-TAG	47
3	(United Kingdom) Lotus-Renault	36
4	(France) Ligier-Renault	19
5	(Italy) Ferrari	13

- Note: Only the top five positions are included for both sets of standings.

Previous race: 1986 Canadian Grand Prix	FIA Formula One World Championship; 1986 season	Next race: 1986 French Grand Prix
Previous race: 1985 Detroit Grand Prix	Detroit Grand Prix	Next race: 1987 Detroit Grand Prix
