= 1986 German Grand Prix =

- Race 10 of 16 in the 1986 Formula One World Championship

Race details
- Date: 27 July 1986
- Official name: XLVIII Großer Preis von Deutschland
- Location: Hockenheimring; Hockenheim, West Germany
- Course: Permanent racing facility
- Course length: 6.802 km (4.227 miles)
- Distance: 44 laps, 299.068 km (185.832 miles)
- Weather: Dry

Pole position
Driver	(Finland) Keke Rosberg	McLaren-TAG
- Time: 1:42.013

Fastest lap
Driver	(Austria) Gerhard Berger	Benetton-BMW
- Time: 1:46.604 on lap 35

Podium
First	(Brazil) Nelson Piquet	Williams-Honda
Second	(Brazil) Ayrton Senna	Lotus-Renault
Third	(United Kingdom) Nigel Mansell	Williams-Honda

The 1986 German Grand Prix was a Formula One motor race held at the Hockenheimring on 27 July 1986. It was the tenth race of the 1986 Formula One World Championship.

== Pre-race ==
In the run-up to the race, Keke Rosberg announced that he would be retiring from Formula One at the end of the season, while Lotus announced that they would be using Honda engines in 1987, following Renault's withdrawal from the sport, with Japanese driver Satoru Nakajima replacing Johnny Dumfries. Meanwhile, Ligier drafted in Philippe Alliot to replace the injured Jacques Laffite.

== Qualifying ==
While other turbo engines of the mid-1980s had qualifying setups with high boost and well over 1000 hp for a few laps, especially BMW, and despite the McLaren drivers asking for more qualifying power, TAG-Porsche put less effort and money into such modifications and stayed closer to race configuration. This worked in the 1986 Monaco Grand Prix, where Alain Prost took pole, fastest lap and the win ahead of his teammate. The all-McLaren front row at the fast Hockenheimring with its long straights in the forest and short stadium section was a surprise. TAG finally used larger turbos while the other brands had to limit boost for the long full throttle sections.

== Race ==
The 45-lap race was race of attrition won by Brazilian driver Nelson Piquet, driving a Williams-Honda. Compatriot Ayrton Senna was second in a Lotus-Renault, with Briton Nigel Mansell third in the other Williams-Honda. Frenchman Alain Prost was running third in his McLaren-TAG in the closing laps when he ran out of fuel, dropping him to sixth and thus allowing Mansell to extend his lead in the Drivers' Championship to seven points.

== Classification ==
=== Qualifying ===
Pos	No	Driver	Constructor	Q1	Q2	Gap
1	2	(Finland) Keke Rosberg	McLaren-TAG	1:42.478	1:42.013	—
2	1	(France) Alain Prost	McLaren-TAG	1:43.373	1:42.166	+0.153
3	12	(Brazil) Ayrton Senna	Lotus-Renault	1:45.212	1:42.329	+0.316
4	20	(Austria) Gerhard Berger	Benetton-BMW	1:44.493	1:42.541	+0.528
5	6	(Brazil) Nelson Piquet	Williams-Honda	1:43.852	1:42.545	+0.532
6	5	(United Kingdom) Nigel Mansell	Williams-Honda	1:42.696	1:43.086	+0.683
7	7	(Italy) Riccardo Patrese	Brabham-BMW	1:46.094	1:43.348	+1.335
8	25	(France) René Arnoux	Ligier-Renault	1:43.991	1:43.693	+1.680
9	19	(Italy) Teo Fabi	Benetton-BMW	12:12.563	1:44.001	+1.998
10	27	(Italy) Michele Alboreto	Ferrari	1:46.319	1:44.308	+2.295
11	28	(Sweden) Stefan Johansson	Ferrari	1:46.847	1:44.346	+2.333
12	11	(United Kingdom) Johnny Dumfries	Lotus-Renault	1:47.845	1:44.768	+2.755
13	16	(France) Patrick Tambay	Lola-Ford	1:47.221	1:44.979	+2.966
14	26	(France) Philippe Alliot	Ligier-Renault	1:45.047	1:45.905	+3.034
15	3	(United Kingdom) Martin Brundle	Tyrrell-Renault	1:49.406	1:45.432	+3.419
16	14	(United Kingdom) Jonathan Palmer	Zakspeed	1:47.167	1:45.887	+3.874
17	17	(West Germany) Christian Danner	Arrows-BMW	1:49.439	1:46.355	+4.342
18	4	(France) Philippe Streiff	Tyrrell-Renault	1:47.371	1:48.397	+5.358
19	15	(Australia) Alan Jones	Lola-Ford	1:51.918	1:47.517	+5.505
20	8	(United Kingdom) Derek Warwick	Brabham-BMW	1:48.206	53:52.766	+6.193
21	18	(Belgium) Thierry Boutsen	Arrows-BMW	1:49.240	2:03.702	+7.227
22	24	(Italy) Alessandro Nannini	Minardi-Motori Moderni	1:50.224	1:49.369	+7.356
23	23	(Italy) Andrea de Cesaris	Minardi-Motori Moderni	1:50.900	1:50.066	+8.053
24	29	(Netherlands) Huub Rothengatter	Zakspeed	1:52.461	1:50.918	+8.905
25	21	(Italy) Piercarlo Ghinzani	Osella-Alfa Romeo		1:56.468	+14.455
26	22	(Canada) Allen Berg	Osella-Alfa Romeo	1:56.959		+14.946

=== Race ===
Pos	No	Driver	Constructor	Laps	Time/Retired	Grid	Points
1	6	(Brazil) Nelson Piquet	Williams-Honda	44	1:22:08.263	5	9
2	12	(Brazil) Ayrton Senna	Lotus-Renault	44	+ 15.437	3	6
3	5	(United Kingdom) Nigel Mansell	Williams-Honda	44	+ 44.580	6	4
4	25	(France) René Arnoux	Ligier-Renault	44	+ 1:15.176	8	3
5	2	(Finland) Keke Rosberg	McLaren-TAG	43	Out of fuel	1	2
6	1	(France) Alain Prost	McLaren-TAG	43	Out of fuel	2	1
7	8	(United Kingdom) Derek Warwick	Brabham-BMW	43	+ 1 Lap	20	
8	16	(France) Patrick Tambay	Lola-Ford	43	+ 1 Lap	13	
9	15	(Australia) Alan Jones	Lola-Ford	42	+ 2 Laps	19	
10	20	(Austria) Gerhard Berger	Benetton-BMW	42	+ 2 Laps	4	
11	28	(Sweden) Stefan Johansson	Ferrari	41	Broken wing	11	
12	22	(Canada) Allen Berg	Osella-Alfa Romeo	40	+ 4 Laps	26	
Ret	17	(West Germany) Christian Danner	Arrows-BMW	38	Turbo	17	
Ret	29	(Netherlands) Huub Rothengatter	Zakspeed	38	Gearbox	24	
Ret	14	(United Kingdom) Jonathan Palmer	Zakspeed	37	Engine	16	
Ret	3	(United Kingdom) Martin Brundle	Tyrrell-Renault	34	Electrical	15	
Ret	7	(Italy) Riccardo Patrese	Brabham-BMW	22	Turbo	7	
Ret	23	(Italy) Andrea de Cesaris	Minardi-Motori Moderni	20	Gearbox	23	
Ret	24	(Italy) Alessandro Nannini	Minardi-Motori Moderni	19	Overheating	22	
Ret	11	(United Kingdom) Johnny Dumfries	Lotus-Renault	17	Water radiator	12	
Ret	18	(Belgium) Thierry Boutsen	Arrows-BMW	13	Turbo	21	
Ret	26	(France) Philippe Alliot	Ligier-Renault	11	Engine	14	
Ret	21	(Italy) Piercarlo Ghinzani	Osella-Alfa Romeo	10	Clutch	25	
Ret	4	(France) Philippe Streiff	Tyrrell-Renault	7	Engine	18	
Ret	27	(Italy) Michele Alboreto	Ferrari	6	Transmission	10	
Ret	19	(Italy) Teo Fabi	Benetton-BMW	0	Collision	9	

== Championship standings after the race ==
Drivers' Championship standings

Pos	Driver	Points
1	(United Kingdom) Nigel Mansell	51
2	(France) Alain Prost	44
3	(Brazil) Ayrton Senna	42
4	(Brazil) Nelson Piquet	38
5	(Finland) Keke Rosberg	19

Constructors' Championship standings

Pos	Constructor	Points
1	(United Kingdom) Williams-Honda	89
2	(United Kingdom) McLaren-TAG	63
3	(United Kingdom) Lotus-Renault	42
4	(France) Ligier-Renault	28
5	(Italy) Ferrari	13

- Note: Only the top five positions are included for both sets of standings.

Previous race: 1986 British Grand Prix	FIA Formula One World Championship; 1986 season	Next race: 1986 Hungarian Grand Prix
Previous race: 1985 German Grand Prix	German Grand Prix	Next race: 1987 German Grand Prix
