= 1986 Canadian Grand Prix =

- Race 6 of 16 in the 1986 Formula One World Championship

Race details
- Date: 15 June 1986
- Official name: XXV Grand Prix du Canada
- Location: Circuit Gilles Villeneuve; Montreal, Quebec, Canada
- Course: Temporary street circuit
- Course length: 4.410 km (2.740 miles)
- Distance: 69 laps, 304.290 km (189.077 miles)
- Weather: Dry with temperatures approaching 25 °C (77 °F); wind speeds up to 20.5 km/h (12.7 mph)

Pole position
Driver	(United Kingdom) Nigel Mansell	Williams-Honda
- Time: 1:24.118

Fastest lap
Driver	(Brazil) Nelson Piquet	Williams-Honda
- Time: 1:25.443 on lap 63 (lap record)

Podium
First	(United Kingdom) Nigel Mansell	Williams-Honda
Second	(France) Alain Prost	McLaren-TAG
Third	(Brazil) Nelson Piquet	Williams-Honda

The 1986 Canadian Grand Prix was a Formula One motor race held at Circuit Gilles Villeneuve, Montreal on 15 June 1986. It was the sixth race of the 1986 Formula One World Championship.

The 69-lap race was won from pole position by Briton Nigel Mansell, driving a Williams-Honda. Frenchman Alain Prost finished second in a McLaren-TAG, with Mansell's Brazilian teammate Nelson Piquet third. Prost took the lead of the Drivers' Championship by two points from Mansell and another Brazilian, Ayrton Senna, who finished fifth in his Lotus-Renault.

This would prove to be the final Canadian Grand Prix held on the circuit in its original configuration with the pits and start/finish straight coming out of the Epingle de Casino Hairpin. After a sponsorship dispute saw the race not held in 1987, a new pit complex was built at the other end of the circuit just before the Epingle de L'ile Hairpin with the circuit also being reprofiled to accommodate a new start/finish straight that would open in time for the 1988 race. The changes to the circuit would result in one less corner (down from 19 to 18), but also added an extra 20 metres of track.

== Classification ==
=== Qualifying ===
Pos	No	Driver	Constructor	Q1	Q2	Gap
1	5	(United Kingdom) Nigel Mansell	Williams-Honda	1:28.829	1:24.118	
2	12	(Brazil) Ayrton Senna	Lotus-Renault	1:27.422	1:24.188	+0.070
3	6	(Brazil) Nelson Piquet	Williams-Honda	1:28.588	1:24.384	+0.266
4	1	(France) Alain Prost	McLaren-TAG	1:29.541	1:25.192	+1.074
5	25	(France) René Arnoux	Ligier-Renault	1:30.200	1:25.224	+1.106
6	2	(Finland) Keke Rosberg	McLaren-TAG	1:29.384	1:25.533	+1.415
7	20	(Austria) Gerhard Berger	Benetton-BMW	1:29.471	1:26.439	+2.321
8	26	(France) Jacques Laffite	Ligier-Renault	1:30.171	1:26.447	+2.329
9	7	(Italy) Riccardo Patrese	Brabham-BMW	1:32.692	1:26.483	+2.365
10	8	(United Kingdom) Derek Warwick	Brabham-BMW	1:33.231	1:27.413	+3.295
11	27	(Italy) Michele Alboreto	Ferrari	1:45.740	1:27.495	+3.377
12	18	(Belgium) Thierry Boutsen	Arrows-BMW	1:35.843	1:27.614	+3.496
13	15	(Australia) Alan Jones	Lola-Ford	1:33.291	1:28.058	+3.940
14	16	(France) Patrick Tambay	Lola-Ford	1:31.487	1:28.095	+3.977
15	19	(Italy) Teo Fabi	Benetton-BMW	1:51.056	1:28.102	+3.984
16	11	(United Kingdom) Johnny Dumfries	Lotus-Renault	1:32.144	1:28.521	+4.403
17	4	(France) Philippe Streiff	Tyrrell-Renault	1:32.307	1:28.639	+4.521
18	28	(Sweden) Stefan Johansson	Ferrari	1:28.881	1:29.078	+4.763
19	3	(United Kingdom) Martin Brundle	Tyrrell-Renault	1:34.233	1:29.111	+4.993
20	24	(Italy) Alessandro Nannini	Minardi-Motori Moderni	1:35.789	1:29.653	+5.535
21	23	(Italy) Andrea de Cesaris	Minardi-Motori Moderni	1:32.619	1:29.854	+5.736
22	14	(United Kingdom) Jonathan Palmer	Zakspeed	1:31.856	1:30.005	+5.887
23	21	(Italy) Piercarlo Ghinzani	Osella-Alfa Romeo	1:36.575	1:31.479	+7.361
24	29	(Netherlands) Huub Rothengatter	Zakspeed	1:46.280	1:32.113	+7.995
25	22	(West Germany) Christian Danner	Osella-Alfa Romeo	1:41.436	no time	+17.318

=== Race ===
Pos	No	Driver	Constructor	Laps	Time/Retired	Grid	Points
1	5	(United Kingdom) Nigel Mansell	Williams-Honda	69	1:42:26.415	1	9
2	1	(France) Alain Prost	McLaren-TAG	69	+ 20.659	4	6
3	6	(Brazil) Nelson Piquet	Williams-Honda	69	+ 36.262	3	4
4	2	(Finland) Keke Rosberg	McLaren-TAG	69	+ 1:35.673	6	3
5	12	(Brazil) Ayrton Senna	Lotus-Renault	68	+ 1 lap	2	2
6	25	(France) René Arnoux	Ligier-Renault	68	+ 1 lap	5	1
7	26	(France) Jacques Laffite	Ligier-Renault	68	+ 1 lap	8	
8	27	(Italy) Michele Alboreto	Ferrari	68	+ 1 lap	11	
9	3	(United Kingdom) Martin Brundle	Tyrrell-Renault	67	+ 2 laps	19	
10	15	(Australia) Alan Jones	Lola-Ford	66	+ 3 laps	13	
11	4	(France) Philippe Streiff	Tyrrell-Renault	65	+ 4 laps	17	
12	29	(Netherlands) Huub Rothengatter	Zakspeed	63	+ 6 laps	24	
Ret	7	(Italy) Riccardo Patrese	Brabham-BMW	44	Turbo	9	
Ret	21	(Italy) Piercarlo Ghinzani	Osella-Alfa Romeo	43	Gearbox	23	
Ret	23	(Italy) Andrea de Cesaris	Minardi-Motori Moderni	40	Gearbox	21	
Ret	18	(Belgium) Thierry Boutsen	Arrows-BMW	38	Electrical	12	
Ret	20	(Austria) Gerhard Berger	Benetton-BMW	34	Turbo	7	
Ret	28	(Sweden) Stefan Johansson	Ferrari	29	Accident	18	
Ret	11	(United Kingdom) Johnny Dumfries	Lotus-Renault	28	Accident	16	
Ret	14	(United Kingdom) Jonathan Palmer	Zakspeed	24	Engine	22	
Ret	8	(United Kingdom) Derek Warwick	Brabham-BMW	20	Engine	10	
Ret	24	(Italy) Alessandro Nannini	Minardi-Motori Moderni	17	Turbo	20	
Ret	19	(Italy) Teo Fabi	Benetton-BMW	13	Battery	15	
Ret	22	(Germany) Christian Danner	Osella-Alfa Romeo	6	Turbo	25	
DNS	16	(France) Patrick Tambay	Lola-Ford	0	Accident in morning warmup	14	

== Championship standings after the race ==
Drivers' Championship standings

Pos	Driver	Points
1	(France) Alain Prost	29
2	(United Kingdom) Nigel Mansell	27
3	(Brazil) Ayrton Senna	27
4	(Brazil) Nelson Piquet	19
5	(Finland) Keke Rosberg	14

Constructors' Championship standings

Pos	Constructor	Points
1	(United Kingdom) Williams-Honda	46
2	(United Kingdom) McLaren-TAG	43
3	(United Kingdom) Lotus-Renault	27
4	(France) Ligier-Renault	13
5	(Italy) Ferrari	10

- Note: Only the top five positions are included for both sets of standings.

Previous race: 1986 Belgian Grand Prix	FIA Formula One World Championship; 1986 season	Next race: 1986 Detroit Grand Prix
Previous race: 1985 Canadian Grand Prix	Canadian Grand Prix	Next race: 1988 Canadian Grand Prix
