= McLaren MP4/2 =

Formula One racing car

McLaren MP4/2 McLaren MP4/2B McLaren MP4/2C
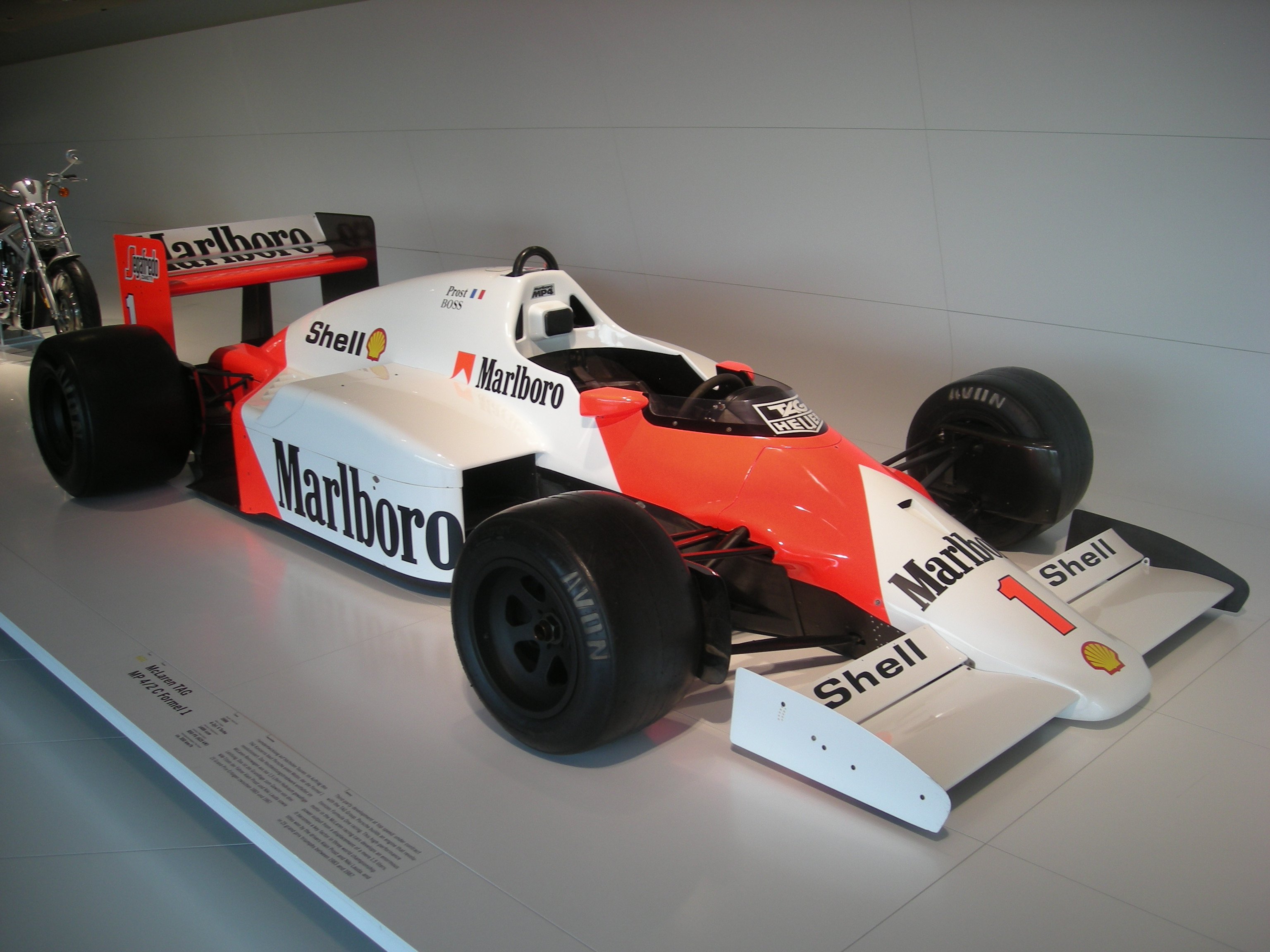
- Alain Prost's 1986 McLaren MP4/2C on display at the Porsche Museum
- Category: Formula One
- Constructor: McLaren (chassis); Porsche (engine)
- Designers: John Barnard (Technical Director, Chief Designer, Executive Engineer); Steve Nichols (Deputy Chief Designer, Senior Engineer); Gordon Kimball (Deputy Chief Designer); Alan Jenkins (Senior Engineer); Tim Wright (Senior Engineer); Bob Bell (Chief Aerodynamicist); Hans Mezger (Chief Engine Designer (Porsche))
- Predecessor: McLaren MP4/1E
- Successor: McLaren MP4/3

Technical specifications
- Chassis: Carbon fibre honeycomb monocoque
- Suspension (front): Double wishbones, Pushrods
- Suspension (rear): Double wishbones, Pushrods
- Axle track: MP4/2 - MP4/2B: Front: 1,803 mm (71.0 in); Rear: 1,651 mm (65.0 in); MP4/2C: Front: 1,816 mm (71.5 in); Rear: 1,676 mm (66.0 in)
- Wheelbase: 2,794 mm (110.0 in)
- Engine: TAG-Porsche TTE PO1, 1,499 cc (91.5 cu in), 90° V6, turbo, mid-engine, longitudinally mounted
- Transmission: McLaren / Hewland FGB 5-speed manual
- Power: 1984: varying setups i.e. turbo boost levels 650–850 bhp (485–634 kW; 659–862 PS) (race trim) - 800–960 bhp (597–716 kW; 811–973 PS) (qualifying trim)
- Weight: 540 kg (1,190.5 lb)
- Fuel: Shell
- Tyres: 1984: Michelin; 1985-1986: Goodyear

Competition history
- Notable entrants: Marlboro McLaren International
- Notable drivers: 7./1. (France) Alain Prost; 8./1. (Austria) Niki Lauda; 2. (Finland) Keke Rosberg; 2. (United Kingdom) John Watson
- Debut: 1984 Brazilian Grand Prix
- First win: 1984 Brazilian Grand Prix
- Last win: 1986 Australian Grand Prix
- Last event: 1986 Australian Grand Prix
Races	Wins	Poles	F/Laps
48	22	7	16
- Constructors' Championships: 2 (1984, 1985)
- Drivers' Championships: 3 (1984 Niki Lauda, 1985, 1986 Alain Prost)

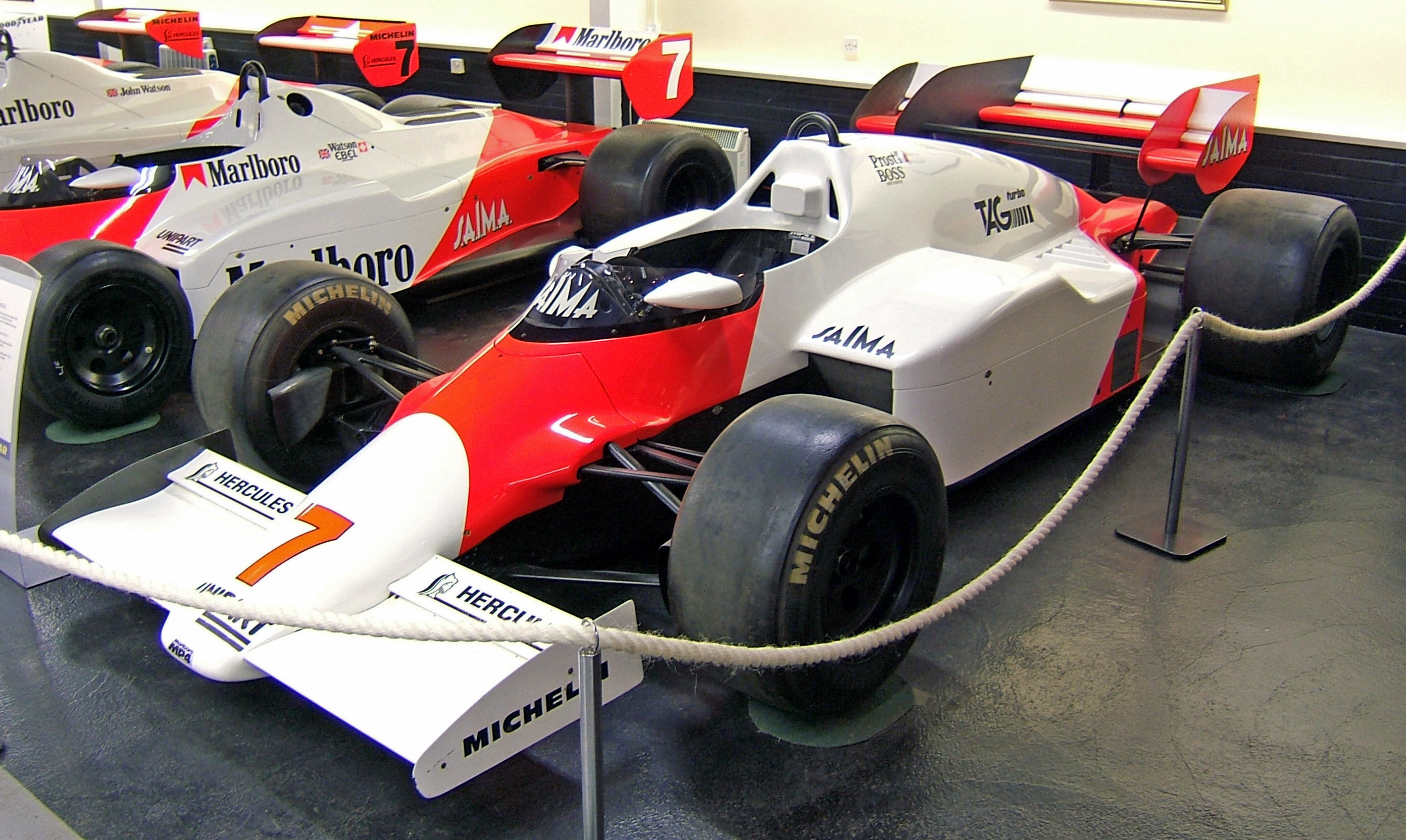
A 1984 McLaren MP4/2, the #7 car driven by Alain Prost

The McLaren MP4/2 was a Formula One car produced by McLaren for the 1984 season. An iteration of it, the MP4/2B, was used in the 1985 season, and a slightly updated version, the MP4/2C, raced in the 1986 season for McLaren. It was closely based on the MP4/1E model that was used as a test car, used in the final races of 1983.

The chassis was designed by John Barnard, Steve Nichols, Gordon Kimball, Alan Jenkins, Tim Wright and Bob Bell with the car being powered by a TAG-Porsche engine, designed by Hans Mezger at Porsche.

== Overview ==
=== 1984 ===
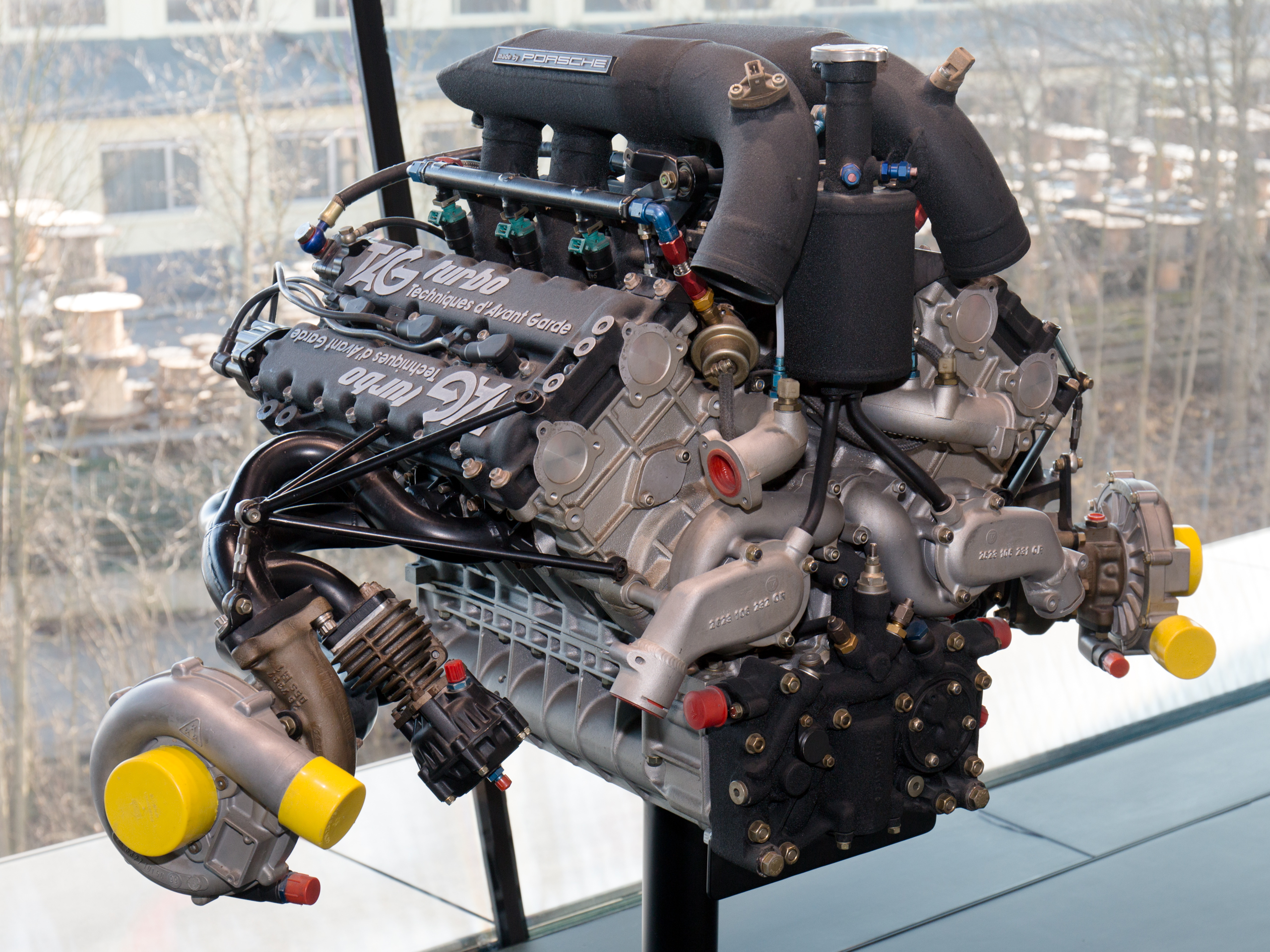
The Porsche built TAG TTE PO1 V6 turbo

Like most of its major competitors (other than the Williams FW09), the car used an all carbon fibre chassis pioneered by the car's designer John Barnard with its predecessor, the MP4/1. The car was powered by a 1.5 Litre, 90° V6 TAG-Porsche turbo engine that produced 650 bhp (485 kW; 659 PS) in race set-up and up to 800 bhp (597 kW; 811 PS) in qualifying set-up i.e. with maximum turbo pressure. It was first used in the 1983 Dutch Grand Prix, at the insistence of veteran Niki Lauda, who felt that the new engine required race testing before a championship challenge could be mounted. Porsche built these engines while TAG Electronics paid for the whole engine program. The MP4/1, which until then had raced with the Cosworth DFY V8 engine, was modified to MP4/1E specs to take the new engine and in the final race of the 1983 season in South Africa, Lauda proved the car was competitive, running at the front of the field and challenging for the lead of the race. He was running second with only six laps remaining, but his race ended with electrical failure on lap 71 of the Kyalami circuit.

Lauda was joined for 1984 by Alain Prost, who had narrowly lost the 1983 championship to Brabham's Nelson Piquet by just two points. Prost was openly critical of Renault's failure to develop the Renault RE40 and was fired two days after the season ended. McLaren boss Ron Dennis immediately snapped up the young Frenchman in place of John Watson (negotiations reportedly broke down when Watson asked for more money than what Lauda was earning, something Dennis baulked at despite Watson having a win and two further podiums in 1983. Watson himself later refuted the claims). Prost and Lauda proved to be a formidable combination and gave McLaren what many considered to be the strongest driver line up of the season. Both were excellent development drivers, and both gave technical feedback on the car and the engine which pushed the car's development far further than the other teams. Prost, who before 1984 had won nine races for Renault, was considered to be the best driver in Formula One and just needed a fast and reliable car to prove it. Lauda, the 1975 and 1977 World Champion, had proven in the Cosworth engined car that he was still a winner and was always a danger, despite openly admitting that he often made the races harder for himself by being a poor qualifier (Lauda's average qualifying position in 1984 was eighth, Prost's was third with the Austrian never out-qualifying his teammate).

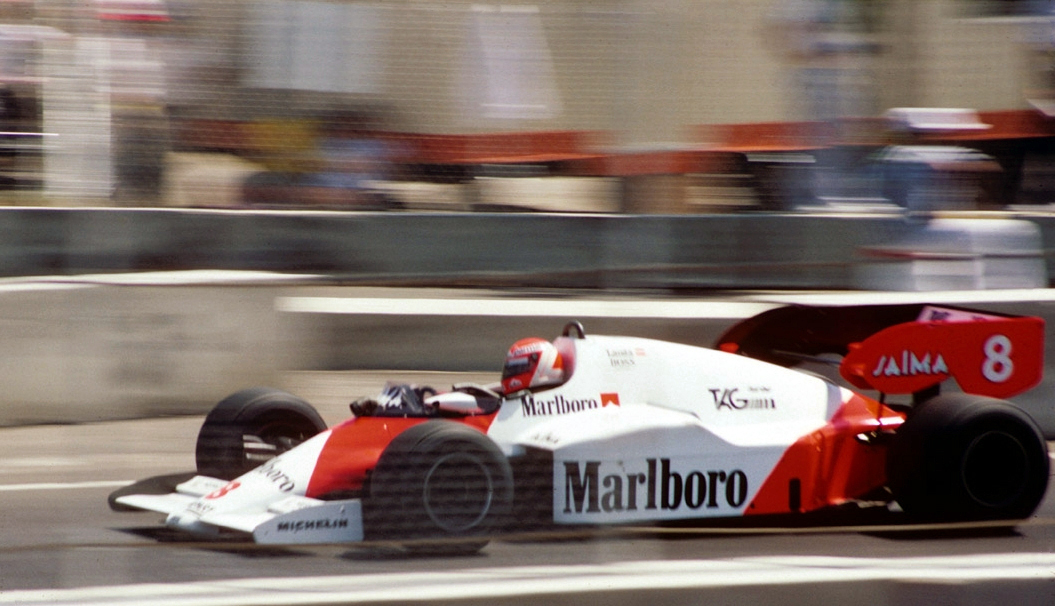
Niki Lauda driving the McLaren MP4/2 at the 1984 Dallas Grand Prix.

The MP4/2 was one of the few F1 cars to use carbon brakes at the time, giving it another major advantage over most of its rivals on all bar the street circuits or when conditions were hot and dry; notably, the carbon brakes were not as good as the steel brakes at tracks like the Detroit and Dallas street circuits due to the steel brakes lasting longer in the heat. That, combined to superior fuel consumption of the allowed 220 litres and the driving skill of Lauda and Prost saw the MP4/2 score 12 wins in 1984, at the time the highest number of wins in a season by a single team. Lauda beat Prost to the championship by just half a point in the final race, even though Prost had 7 wins to Lauda's 5 (at the final round in Portugal, Prost needed to win and have Lauda finish 3rd or worse to take the title. Lauda finished second). This remains the closest finish to a championship in Formula One history.

Often the MP4/2s were the only cars to finish on the same lap, such was their domination. The MP4/2 and both its updated successors were very aerodynamically efficient cars and had excellent rear-end traction, and as a result they clearly handled the best in long, high speed corners- their superiority was more obvious on high-speed circuits made up of these long, fast corners, such as Jacarepagua, Dijon, Silverstone, Zandvoort, Spa and Kyalami, and particularly the Österreichring, where all 3 variations of the MP4/2 won in successive years (1984, 1985 and 1986), beginning with Lauda's only ever win in his home Grand Prix in 1984 cheered on by thousands of his countrymen and women. McLaren comfortably won the constructors' championship from Ferrari with a score of 143.5 to just 57.5 from the Prancing Horse.

Although the MP4/2 was not the fastest car in qualifying (since they were the only top team not using special engines for qualifying) — often beaten by the Brabham BT53-BMW turbo of Piquet who scored 9 pole positions for the season — it was the most reliable and most consistent, attributes which helped it be so successful throughout its career. Only twice during the season were the McLarens outclassed on pure pace. These were Michele Alboreto's win for Ferrari in Belgium at Zolder, and Piquet's first win (and points) of the year in Canada. The other two races the team did not win were the North American street races at Detroit (Piquet) and Dallas (Keke Rosberg - Williams-Honda).

On the official FIA video review of the 1984 season (produced by the Formula One Constructors Association), narrator Clive James summed up the year with the words "Anything as fast as the McLarens fell apart, anything as reliable finished later". Even though the comments were made for Round 2 of the championship in South Africa where Lauda and Prost scored the first of four 1-2 finishes for the year and had lapped the entire field, a feat even more remarkable since Prost was forced to start from the pit lane, it proved to be an accurate summary for McLaren's season long dominance.

It was lucky that both McLarens actually started the race at Kyalami. This was due to a massive race morning warm up crash that destroyed the Osella-Alfa Romeo of Piercarlo Ghinzani and gave the Italian driver burns to his hands and face forcing him to miss the race. As a result, McLaren were given approximately 30 minutes of extra time to fix a misfire that had developed in Lauda's TAG-Porsche which required a complete electrical system replacement. Had Ghinzani not crashed Lauda would have been forced to start in the spare car which would have left Prost a non-starter as his own MP4/2 suffered a mechanical fuel pump failure as the grid went away on their final warm up lap. Prost was able to start in the spare from the pit lane (hurriedly converted to his settings as it had been Lauda's for the weekend) and put in one of his trademark drives to be the only other driver to finish on the lead lap with his teammate, though he started his last lap only seconds before Lauda took the flag.

During 1984, both McLarens failed to finish a race only on two occasions in Belgium and Dallas, while recording four 1-2 finishes in South Africa, Germany, Holland and Portugal. McLaren wrapped up the Constructors' title in Round 13 with their 1–2 at Zandvoort, while the Drivers' title became a two horse race following the next race in Italy as the mathematical chance that Lotus-Renault driver Elio de Angelis had to upset the McLaren's evaporated as Lauda won and de Angelis suffered gearbox failure on lap 14. The race at Monza was also Prost's shortest of the year, ending after just three laps with a blown TAG engine.

=== 1985 ===
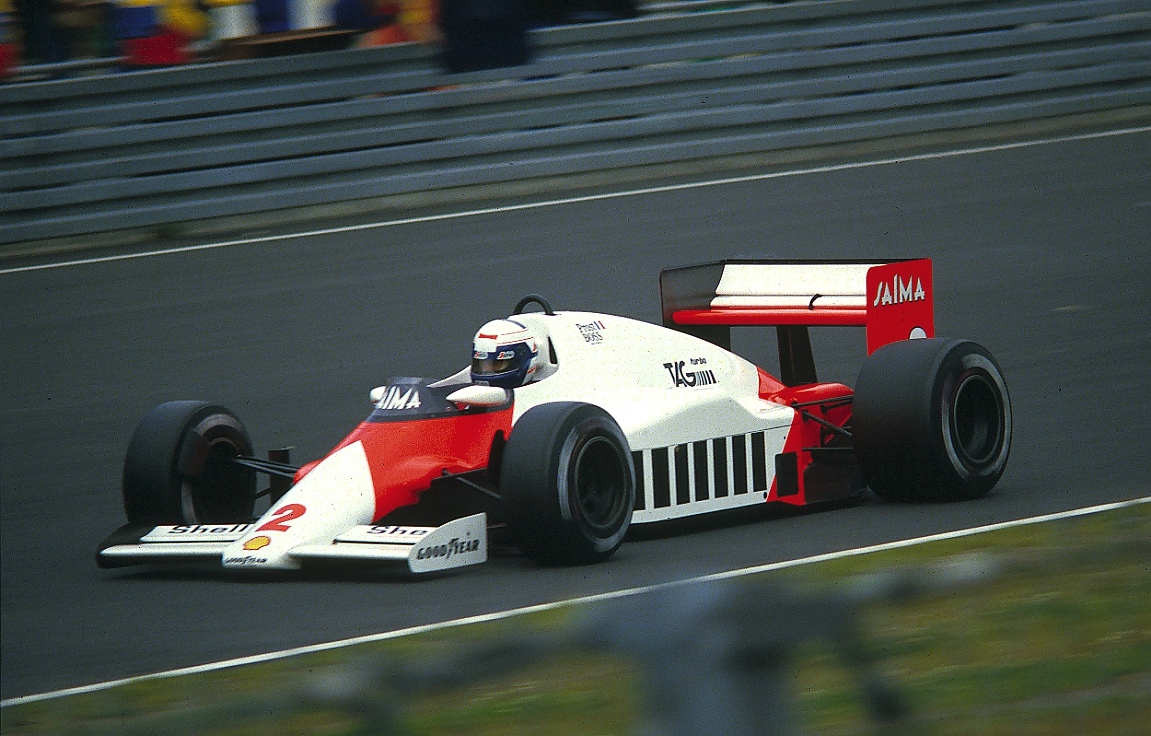
Alain Prost driving the McLaren MP4/2B at the 1985 German Grand Prix.

For 1985, the MP4/2 was updated with cleaner aerodynamics and redesigned wings (to comply with new regulations which banned the "winglets" on the rear wings of the cars which had been in use since 1983) and was dubbed the "MP4/2B", while Porsche refined the TAG engine with improved power (850 bhp (634 kW; 862 PS) in race and 960 bhp (716 kW; 973 PS) in qualifying) and fuel consumption. The suspension had to be redesigned after McLaren were forced to switch from Michelin to Goodyear tyres when the French company pulled out of Formula One. However, the competition had more or less caught up. Michele Alboreto in his Ferrari 156/85 fought Prost for most of the season, until McLaren's greater reliability and their superiority in the high-speed circuits that followed told in both championships. Prost won his first championship with 5 wins and wrapped up the title with two rounds still to run by finishing a calculated 4th in the European Grand Prix at Brands Hatch (Prost admitted that he did not like 'driving for points' like he had at Brands and the previous race in Belgium, but after losing the last two championships by only 2 and ½ a point respectively, did not want to risk losing for a third time). McLaren claimed their second successive constructors' championship, scoring 90 points to Ferrari's 82, with Williams-Honda and Lotus-Renault tied on 71 points, though Williams won four races to Lotus' three.

Lauda retired from F1 at the end of the season, but not before adding a final victory to his tally in the 1985 Dutch Grand Prix at Zandvoort where he finished only 0.232 seconds in front of Prost. Lauda's win in the Netherlands also showed that McLaren had no team orders as to who should finish in front, just that they should not take each other out of the race. This was despite the fact that a win would have been more beneficial to Prost's championship challenge. Going into the race Prost and Alboreto were tied at the top of the table on 50 points. With Prost finishing 2nd and Alboreto 4th, it gave Prost a three-point lead in the championship, a lead he would not relinquish to become the first (and so far only) French driver to ever win the World Drivers' Championship. As it was, Alboreto's Ferrari was hit by unreliability and he failed to score in the final five races of the season following Zandvoort. The MP4/2B was as good a car as its predecessor, and retained its superiority on high-speed circuits made up of long, fast corners that were not flat out such as Jacarepagua, Silverstone, the Österreichring, Kyalami, and Brands Hatch.

The only times that mean anything to me are in the warm-up on race morning. If you've qualified in the first six or so, and you're in good shape for the race, overtaking is not usually too much of a problem. The car has been better than ever this year, but for sure the engine program is six months behind. That has certainly been our major problem this year, shortage of power. Our engine will not accept a lot of turbo boost.

— Alain Prost talking about the McLaren-TAG and his racing philosophy following his first World Championship win.

Later in the 1980s, Prost's former Renault teammate of 1983 Eddie Cheever confirmed the view of the other drivers when he said that they often had no need to worry about Prost during qualifying, unless he happened to be on the pole. The time to start worrying about him was at the end of the race morning warm up when the name A. Prost would be at or near the top of the timesheet with a time closer to his qualifying time than most of the grid. Then the others knew what they feared, Prost had qualified with a good race set up. Often he would be some two or three seconds off the pace in qualifying due to the TAG engine having less power than its rivals, but come the morning warm-up he would be the fastest more often than not.

=== 1986 ===
The MP4/2 was little changed in 1986, with the exclusion of some tweaking in aerodynamics which saw it dubbed the "MP4/2C", while Prost was joined by Finn Keke Rosberg, the 1982 World Champion when driving for Williams. Rosberg was expected to not only be faster than Prost, but also to push for Prost's championship. However, the Finn's style of driving was not suited to the MP4/2C and his task was made difficult by John Barnard's refusal before mid-season to allow him to change the set up to suit (coincidentally, by the time Barnard relented, he had announced he was leaving McLaren for Ferrari at the end of the year). It was only after Rosberg announced his retirement from F1 prior to the German Grand Prix at Hockenheim that Barnard allowed Rosberg to change how his car was set up, the only race of the year Rosberg's qualified on pole position. Rosberg's main problem with the car, other than his heavy right foot which saw him run out of fuel in a few early season races, was that Barnard had originally designed the car to suit the smoother driving styles of Prost and Niki Lauda, while Rosberg had never shaken the ground effects style of late braking and throwing the car into a corner. Before Barnard relented on setup, the Finn was always quick, but was mostly outshone by his teammate and unfortunately for Rosberg, by the time he was able to set up the MP4/2C to his liking the championship for him was lost.

By 1986 the Williams FW11 had overtaken McLaren as the best car; notably, the MP4/2's mileage was not as good as it was in 1984, with the fuel tank reduced in size from 220 litres to 195 litres (the TAG's fuel mileage was hurt by the increased speeds). Nelson Piquet had left Brabham to join Nigel Mansell at Williams and the two fought a fierce internal battle, while Prost cleverly built up his points total and snatched 4 wins from under the Williams teammates' noses. His second world championship was won more by stealth than speed as by now it was clear the TAG Porsche engine was past its best. The TAG-Porsche V6 engine was producing some 850 bhp (634 kW; 862 PS) in race trim by 1986 compared to 900 bhp (671 kW; 912 PS) of the Honda, Renault and BMW engines. In qualifying BMW was rated the most powerful at 1,400 bhp (1,044 kW; 1,419 PS), Renault and Honda engines had approximately 1,200 bhp (895 kW; 1,217 PS). Ferrari allegedly had the same amount of power as the Honda's, but their Ferrari F1/86 was uncompetitive on all but the smoothest of tracks and was generally not a threat.

Prost won his second championship in dramatic circumstances at the season ending Australian Grand Prix. Going into the race, Prost trailed Mansell by 7 points with Piquet a further 2 behind Prost. Rosberg, in his last ever F1 Grand Prix, cleared out early and built up a 30-second lead before suffering a tyre failure on lap 62 (he later admitted he would not have won anyway as if it was needed he planned to give best to Prost in his attempt to win his second championship). Just one lap later on the same piece of road, Mansell suffered the same, but a much more spectacular tyre failure at some 180 mph (290 km/h) on the high-speed Brabham Straight which ended his race. Piquet, who had inherited Rosberg's lead then pitted for tyres to avoid a repeat of Mansell's problem and handed the lead to Prost (himself having stopped on lap 30 to replace a puncture). Prost went on to win from Piquet and Ferrari's Stefan Johansson (who would replace Rosberg at McLaren for 1987) to secure his second World Championship and become the first driver to win back-to-back championships since Jack Brabham had won in 1959 and 1960.

The MP4/2 won 22 Grands Prix (Prost, 16; Lauda, 6), took 7 pole positions (Prost, 6; Rosberg, 1), and scored 327.5 points throughout its three-year career. It contributed to 2 Constructors' and 3 Drivers' championships, and remains among the most successful chassis in F1 history.

Prost's MP4/2C was driven at the 2010 Goodwood Festival of Speed by 2009 World Champion Jenson Button who had joined McLaren in 2010.

MP4/2C at Goodwood Festival of Speed 2010

== Sponsorship and livery ==
At the 1986 Portuguese Grand Prix, Rosberg's MP4/2C were painted with yellow Marlboro logo to promote the Marlboro Lights.

== Complete Formula One results ==
(key) (results in bold indicate pole position; results in italics indicate fastest lap)

Year	Entrant	Chassis	Engine	Tyres	Drivers	1	2	3	4	5	6	7	8	9	10	11	12	13	14	15	16	Points	WCC
1984	Marlboro McLaren International	MP4/2	TAG Porsche TTE PO1; V6 tc	MI		BRA	RSA	BEL	SMR	FRA	MON	CAN	DET	DAL	GBR	GER	AUT	NED	ITA	EUR	POR	143.5	1st
1984	Marlboro McLaren International	MP4/2	TAG Porsche TTE PO1; V6 tc	MI	Alain Prost	1	2	Ret	1	7	**1**	3	4	Ret	Ret	**1**	Ret	**1**	Ret	1	1	143.5	1st
1984	Marlboro McLaren International	MP4/2	TAG Porsche TTE PO1; V6 tc	MI	Niki Lauda	Ret	1	Ret	Ret	1	Ret	2	Ret	Ret	1	2	1	2	1	4	2	143.5	1st
1985	Marlboro McLaren International	MP4/2B	TAG Porsche TTE PO1; V6 tc	G		BRA	POR	SMR	MON	CAN	DET	FRA	GBR	GER	AUT	NED	ITA	BEL	EUR	RSA	AUS	90	1st
1985	Marlboro McLaren International	MP4/2B	TAG Porsche TTE PO1; V6 tc	G	Niki Lauda	Ret	Ret	4	Ret	Ret	Ret	Ret	Ret	5	Ret	1	Ret	PO		Ret	Ret	90	1st
1985	Marlboro McLaren International	MP4/2B	TAG Porsche TTE PO1; V6 tc	G	Alain Prost	1	Ret	DSQ	1	3	Ret	3	1	2	**1**	2	1	**3**	4	3	Ret	90	1st
1985	Marlboro McLaren International	MP4/2B	TAG Porsche TTE PO1; V6 tc	G	John Watson														7			90	1st
1986	Marlboro McLaren International	MP4/2C	TAG Porsche TTE PO1; V6 tc	G		BRA	ESP	SMR	MON	BEL	CAN	DET	FRA	GBR	GER	HUN	AUT	ITA	POR	MEX	AUS	96	2nd
1986	Marlboro McLaren International	MP4/2C	TAG Porsche TTE PO1; V6 tc	G	Alain Prost	Ret	3	1	**1**	6	2	3	2	3	6	Ret	1	DSQ	2	2	1	96	2nd
1986	Marlboro McLaren International	MP4/2C	TAG Porsche TTE PO1; V6 tc	G	Keke Rosberg	Ret	4	5	2	Ret	4	Ret	4	Ret	**5**	Ret	9	4	Ret	Ret	Ret	96	2nd

== See also ==
- Williams FW11
- Lotus 97T

Awards
Preceded by Brabham BT52	Autosport; Racing Car Of The Year; 1984	Succeeded by Williams FW10B
