= Allen Berg =

Canadian racing driver (born 1961)

- Born: 1 August 1961 (age 65); Vancouver, British Columbia, Canada

Formula One World Championship career
- Nationality: (Canada) Canadian
- Active years: 1986
- Team: Osella
- Entries: 9
- Championships: 0
- Wins: 0
- Podiums: 0
- Career points: 0
- Pole positions: 0
- Fastest laps: 0
- First entry: 1986 Detroit Grand Prix
- Last entry: 1986 Australian Grand Prix

Allen Bernard Berg (born August 1, 1961) is a Canadian former racing driver who most notably raced for the Osella team in Formula One. His son, Alex, is a racing driver.

== Personal life ==
Berg's son, Alex, is also a racing driver.

== Racing career ==
Berg was born in Vancouver, British Columbia. He began in karting in 1978 and switched to cars when he was 20, into Formula Atlantic. In 1983, he won the prestigious Tasman Formula Pacific Series in Australia and New Zealand and entered the British Formula 3 series. However, his timing was bad since he had to compete against Ayrton Senna and Martin Brundle. He won one race (one which Senna and Brundle opted out of to compete for European F3 points and outright race win) and ended up fifth in the series. The following year, he was runner-up in the British F3 series to Johnny Dumfries with eight second places. At the end of the season, he tested for Arrows and Tyrrell and held discussions with Spirit and RAM Racing but neither led to a drive in Formula 1.

In 1985, Berg returned to Canada to seek funding for Formula One.

In 1986, Berg managed to buy a seat in the Osella F1 team midway through the season, taking the seat vacated by Christian Danner, who had left to join the Arrows team to replace Marc Surer. Surer suffered career-ending injuries in the 1986 ADAC Hessen-Rallye between the Belgian and Canadian Grands Prix. Berg took part in nine races before his sponsorship ran out and he missed the Italian Grand Prix; further sponsorship did at least mean he was able to see out the season. He had advanced discussions with several F1 teams to continue in F1 in 1987, including Larrousse, but, with the cancellation of the Canadian Grand Prix that season, he could not raise enough sponsorship and was unable to secure a drive.

Berg has remained involved in motor sport as a professional driver, team owner, series administrator, driving coach and instructor. He has competed in sportscar racing and the Trans-Am Series. He spent a season driving a privateer BMW M3 in the Deutsche Tourenwagen Meisterschaft in 1991, before enjoying success on the Mexican racing scene, winning the Mexican Formula 2 championship in 1993. He also won the Indy Lights Panamericana title in 2001 as a driver-owner, before retiring from driving.

Berg currently operates Allen Berg Racing Schools primarily in Monterey, California, based at WeatherTech Raceway Laguna Seca. Allen Berg Racing Schools provides a race driving experience in formula racing cars for people with little to no experience. The school also provides instructional programs for up-and-coming drivers to work their way into driving professionally. Multiple graduates of the school have gone on to drive race cars for a career.

== Racing record ==
=== Complete British Formula Three Championship results ===
(key) (Races in bold indicate pole position) (Races in italics indicate fastest lap)

Year	Entrant	Engine	1	2	3	4	5	6	7	8	9	10	11	12	13	14	15	16	17	18	19	20	DC	Pts
1983	Neil Trundle Racing	Toyota	SIL; 10	THR; 8	SIL; 7	DON; Ret	THR; 5	SIL; 7	THR; 6	BRH; 5	SIL; 3	SIL; 10	CAD; Ret	SNE; Ret	SIL; 4	DON; Ret	OUL; 3	SIL; 4	OUL; 5	THR; Ret	SIL; 5	THR; DNS	5th	32
1984	Eddie Jordan Racing	Toyota	SIL; 2	THR; 2	SIL; 8	ZOL; 3	THR; 16	THR; 4	DON; 2	**SIL**; 3	SNE; 15	DON; 2	OUL; Ret	SIL; 2	SPA; 2	ZAN; 3	BRH; 2	THR; 6	SIL; 2				2nd	67

=== Complete Formula One results ===
(key)

Year	Entrant	Chassis	Engine	1	2	3	4	5	6	7	8	9	10	11	12	13	14	15	16	WDC	Pts
1986	Osella Squadra Corse	Osella FA1G	Alfa Romeo 890T 1.5 V8t	BRA	ESP	SMR	MON	BEL	CAN	DET; Ret	FRA; Ret	GBR; Ret								NC	0
1986	Osella Squadra Corse	Osella FA1F	Alfa Romeo 890T 1.5 V8t										GER; 12	HUN; Ret	AUT; Ret	ITA	POR; 13	MEX; 16	AUS; NC	NC	0

=== Complete 24 Hours of Le Mans results ===
Year	Team	Co-Drivers	Car	Class	Laps	Pos.	Class Pos.
1990	(United Kingdom) Richard Lloyd Racing	(United Kingdom) John Watson (Italy) Bruno Giacomelli	Porsche 962C	C1	335	11th	11th

Sporting positions
Preceded by Carlos Guerrero	Mexican Formula Two Champion; 1993	Succeeded by Fernando Plata
