= John Crichton-Stuart, 7th Marquess of Bute =

Scottish peer and racing driver (1958–2021)

The Most Honourable The Marquess of Bute
- Born: John Colum Crichton-Stuart; 26 April 1958; Rothesay, Buteshire, Scotland
- Died: 22 March 2021 (aged 62)
- Other names: Johnny Dumfries; John Bute
- Education: Ampleforth College
- Occupation: Racing driver
- Spouses: Carolyn Waddell (m. 1984; div. 1993) Serena Solitaire Wendell (m. 1999)
- Children: 4 including John Bryson Crichton-Stuart, 8th Marquess of Bute
- Parent(s): John Crichton-Stuart, 6th Marquess of Bute; Nicola Weld-Forester

Formula One World Championship career
- Nationality: (United Kingdom) British
- Active years: 1986
- Team: Lotus
- Entries: 16 (15 starts)
- Championships: 0
- Wins: 0
- Podiums: 0
- Career points: 3
- Pole positions: 0
- Fastest laps: 0
- First entry: 1986 Brazilian Grand Prix
- Last entry: 1986 Australian Grand Prix

24 Hours of Le Mans career
- Years: 1987 – 1991
- Teams: Kouros Racing; Silk Cut Jaguar/TWR; Toyota Team Tom's; Courage Compétition
- Best finish: 1st (1988)
- Class wins: 1 (1988)

John Colum Crichton-Stuart, 7th Marquess of Bute (26 April 1958 – 22 March 2021), was a Scottish peer and racing driver, best known for winning the 24 Hours of Le Mans in 1988. He was known as Johnny Dumfries, or, after he succeeded his father as marquess in 1993, John Bute. He attended Ampleforth College, as had his father and most male members of the Crichton-Stuart family, but did not finish the normal five years of study.

== Early life ==
Bute was born in Rothesay into one of Scotland's oldest families, the son of John, 6th Marquess of Bute, and Nicola Weld-Forester. He was a descendant of the 3rd Earl of Bute, an 18th-century prime minister. His courtesy title as heir to his father's peerage was Earl of Dumfries.

Bute had two older sisters, Sophia, who later married the musician Jimmy Bain, and Caroline, who died in a car accident in 1984. He also had a younger brother, Anthony, who became an art dealer in the United States.

The children's nanny was Helen Lightbody, who had served as nanny to Prince Charles and Princess Anne, and they were brought up in Mount Stuart House on the Isle of Bute. Bute later recalled how easy it was for a child to hide in the house.

Heir to a large fortune, the young Dumfries was educated at Ampleforth College, which he left at the age of sixteen and set about pursuing a career in motor racing.

== Career ==
In 1984, Bute, then known as Johnny Dumfries, was the sensation of the F3 season, scoring 14 race victories on his way to winning, and completely dominating, the British Formula 3 Championship for Team BP (Dave Price Racing). He also finished runner-up to Ivan Capelli in the European Formula Three Championship that year. In 1985, he graduated to the newly created FIA International Formula 3000 Championship, initially competing for Onyx Race Engineering before switching to Lola Motorsport. It was a disappointing season, with a sixth-place finish in Vallelunga being the highlight of the year.

In 1986, Bute made his breakthrough into F1, and raced a single season for the JPS Team Lotus. He was a late addition to the team, apparently as a result of Ayrton Senna not wanting Derek Warwick as a teammate. He competed in 15 Grands Prix for Lotus (not qualifying at Monaco), which used the turbocharged Renault engines and scored three championship points. During most of the 1986 season he was usually one of the midfield drivers, on par with the Tyrrell drivers Martin Brundle and Philippe Streiff. He was replaced for 1987 by the Japanese driver Satoru Nakajima as part of Lotus's deal to use Honda engines from that season onwards.

In 1988, Bute scored the biggest racing victory of his career when he won the Le Mans 24 Hours, driving a Jaguar XJR-9 for Tom Walkinshaw's Silk Cut Jaguar Team alongside Dutchman Jan Lammers and Englishman Andy Wallace.

Bute also participated in the 1-hour endurance race in the 1988 British Touring Car Championship at Donington Park with fellow ex-F1 Briton Guy Edwards for Andy Rouse's Kaliber Racing team in Ford Sierra RS500, finishing third overall and in Class A.

== Wealth ==
Bute ranked 616th in the Sunday Times Rich List 2008, with an estimated wealth of £125m. In the 2006 list, he ranked 26th in Scotland with £122m.

Bute lived with his family in London and at his ancestral seat, Mount Stuart House, 5 miles (8 km) south of Rothesay on the Isle of Bute. In December 2020 he was charged with breaching COVID-19 restrictions for allegedly travelling to his Bute home from London.

In 2007, another family country house, Dumfries House in Cumnock, Ayrshire, was sold to a trust, now called The King's Foundation, for £45 million. The house is now the headquarters of the foundation.

== Personal life ==
In 1984, Bute married Carolyn Waddell; they were divorced in 1993. They had three children:

- Lady Caroline Crichton-Stuart (b. 26 September 1984)
- Lady Cathleen Crichton-Stuart (b. 14 September 1986)
- John Bryson Crichton-Stuart, 8th Marquess of Bute (b. 21 December 1989)

On the Isle of Bute in February 1999, he married his second wife, fashion designer Serena Wendell. They had one child:

- Lady Lola Affrica Crichton-Stuart (b. 23 June 1999)

Bute died of cancer in March 2021.

== Racing record ==
=== Complete British Formula Three results ===
(key) (Races in bold indicate pole position) (Races in italics indicate fastest lap)

Year	Entrant	Engine	1	2	3	4	5	6	7	8	9	10	11	12	13	14	15	16	17	DC	Pts
1984	Team BP	Volkswagen	**SIL**; 1	THR; 1	SIL; 1	ZOL; 2	**THR**; 1	**THR**; 1	**DON**; 1	SIL; 4	**SNE**; 1	**DON**; 9	OUL	**SIL**; 1	SPA; 7	ZAN	**BRH**; 18	**THR**; 1	**SIL**; 1	**1st**	**106**

=== Complete International Formula 3000 results ===
(key)

Year	Entrant	1	2	3	4	5	6	7	8	9	10	11	12	Pos.	Pts
1985	Onyx Racing	SIL; Ret	THR; 7	EST; Ret	NÜR; C	VAL; 6	PAU							16th	1
1985	Lola Motorsport							SPA; Ret	DIJ; 10	PER	ÖST	ZAN	DON	16th	1
1988	GEM Motorsport	JER	VAL	PAU	SIL	MNZ	PER	BRH	BIR	BUG	ZOL; Ret	DIJ; 13		NC	0

=== Complete Formula One results ===
(key)

Year	Entrant	Chassis	Engine	1	2	3	4	5	6	7	8	9	10	11	12	13	14	15	16	WDC	Pts.
1986	John Player Special Team Lotus	Lotus 98T	Renault V6 t	BRA; 9	ESP; Ret	SMR; Ret	MON; DNQ	BEL; Ret	CAN; Ret	DET; 7	FRA; Ret	GBR; 7	GER; Ret	HUN; 5	AUT; Ret	ITA; Ret	POR; 9	MEX; Ret	AUS; 6	13th	3

=== Complete 24 Hours of Le Mans results ===
Year	Class	No	Tyres	Car	Team	Co-drivers	Laps	Pos.	Class Pos.
1987	C1	62	**M**	Sauber C9; Mercedes-Benz M117 5.0L Turbo V8	(Switzerland) Kouros Racing	(United States) Chip Ganassi (New Zealand) Mike Thackwell	37	DNF	DNF
1988	C1	2	**D**	Jaguar XJR-9LM; Jaguar 7.0L V12	(United Kingdom) Silk Cut Jaguar	(Netherlands) Jan Lammers (United Kingdom) Andy Wallace	394	**1st**	**1st**
1989	C1	37	**B**	Toyota 89C-V; Toyota R32V 3.2L Turbo V8	(Japan) Toyota Team Tom's	(United Kingdom) Geoff Lees (United Kingdom) John Watson	58	DNF	DNF
1990	C1	37	**B**	Toyota 90C-V; Toyota R32V 3.2L Turbo V8	(Japan) Toyota Team Tom's	(Japan) Aguri Suzuki (Italy) Roberto Ravaglia	64	DNF	DNF
1991	C2	13	**G**	Courage C26S; Porsche Type-935 3.0L Turbo Flat-6	(France) Courage Compétition	(Sweden) Anders Olofsson (Sweden) Thomas Danielsson	45	DNF	DNF

=== Complete British Touring Car Championship results ===
(key) (Races in bold indicate pole position in class) (Races in italics indicate fastest lap in class - 1 point awarded all races)

Year	Team	Car	Class	1	2	3	4	5	6	7	8	9	10	11	12	13	DC	Pts	Class
1988	Kaliber Racing	Ford Sierra RS500	A	SIL	OUL	THR	DON ovr:3‡ cls:3‡	THR	SIL	SIL	BRH	SNE	BRH	BIR	DON	SIL	43rd	4	16th
1989	Kaliber Racing	Ford Sierra RS500	A	OUL	SIL	THR	DON; DNS	THR	SIL	SIL	BRH	SNE	BRH	BIR	DON	SIL	NC	0	NC

‡ Endurance driver.

Peerage of Great Britain
Preceded by John Crichton-Stuart	Marquess of Bute; 1993–2021	Succeeded by John Crichton-Stuart
Sporting positions
Preceded by Ayrton Senna	British Formula Three Champion; 1984	Succeeded by Maurício Gugelmin
Preceded by Derek Bell; Hans-Joachim Stuck; Al Holbert	Winner of the 24 Hours of Le Mans; 1988; With: Jan Lammers & Andy Wallace	Succeeded by Jochen Mass; Manuel Reuter; Stanley Dickens
Awards and achievements
Preceded by Martin Brundle	Autosport; National Racing Driver of the Year; 1984	Succeeded by Andy Rouse
