= 1985 Australian Grand Prix =

Race 16 of 16 in the 1985 Formula One World Championship
← Previous race	Next race →

Race details
- Date: 3 November 1985
- Official name: L Mitsubishi Australian Grand Prix
- Location: Adelaide Street Circuit; Adelaide, South Australia
- Course: Temporary street circuit
- Course length: 3.780 km (2.362 miles)
- Distance: 82 laps, 309.960 km (193.684 miles)
- Weather: Sunny

Pole position
Driver	(Brazil) Ayrton Senna	Lotus-Renault
- Time: 1:19.843

Fastest lap
Driver	(Finland) Keke Rosberg	Williams-Honda
- Time: 1:23.758 on lap 57

Podium
First	(Finland) Keke Rosberg	Williams-Honda
Second	(France) Jacques Laffite	Ligier-Renault
Third	(France) Philippe Streiff	Ligier-Renault

The 1985 Australian Grand Prix was a Formula One motor race held on the Adelaide Street Circuit in Adelaide on 3 November 1985. The sixteenth and final race of the 1985 Formula One World Championship, it was the 50th running of the Australian Grand Prix and the first to be held on the streets of Adelaide on a layout specifically designed for the debut of the World Championship in Australia. The race was held over 82 laps of the 3.780 km (2.362 mi) circuit for a total race distance of 310 kilometres. The race was won by Keke Rosberg driving a Williams-Honda; this was the final win for Rosberg, the last race for Alfa Romeo until 2019, and the last by a Finnish driver until Mika Häkkinen won the 1997 European Grand Prix. This would also be the last F1 race for three time world champion Niki Lauda.

== Pre-race ==
The new Adelaide Street Circuit was received extremely positively with glowing reviews from those within the paddock despite the circuit's temporary nature as it wound through streets, parkland and across horse racing venue Victoria Park Racecourse immediately adjacent to the Adelaide central business district, with the drivers enjoying a street circuit that was unlike Monaco and Detroit with their endless short straights, narrow roads and hairpin or right angle corners. The Adelaide circuit was wide and fast in places, and included a 900-metre long straight (named the "Brabham Straight" for Australia's three-time World Champion Jack Brabham) where the faster cars reached over 200 mph (322 km/h). The reception for the track, and the professional way in which the event was organised and executed was sufficiently positive to see the promoters awarded the Formula One Promotional Trophy for 1985.

Dual World Champion Nelson Piquet confirmed the drivers' positive view on the circuit when he said early in race week "After Detroit, Dallas and Las Vegas, we all expected another bad street circuit", while his Brabham team boss and head of the Formula One Constructors Association (FOCA) Bernie Ecclestone told the assembled media that he believed that the standard of the organisation and the circuit itself was bad news for Formula One, explaining that Adelaide had raised the standards of what would be expected in the future and that several tracks in the rest of the world already on the calendar, or hoping to be, would have to lift their own games in order to match it. Over the course of the weekend, the only complaint from the drivers was of a lack of grip on the newly laid surface (along with the new road built inside the Victoria Park Racecourse which is where the pits were located, the entire circuit other than the Brabham Straight had been re-laid a few months prior to the race to prevent the problems often faced on American street circuits where the road surface broke up badly under the strain of the high powered cars). The new surface was causing graining in both qualifying and race tyres. Other than a bump in the road at the end of the Brabham Straight where the old surface met the new one, the circuit itself was generally given the thumbs up by those that really mattered, the teams and their often highly paid drivers.

The only Australian driver in the field, 1980 World Drivers' Champion Alan Jones who was driving the Haas Lola team's Lola THL1-Hart, was given the honour of driving the first Formula One car out onto the new circuit when first practice opened at 10am on the Thursday morning (standard practice at the time was to give an extra day's practice at a new circuit, though the meeting starting on the Thursday with just the support categories became a feature of the AGP in Adelaide). Bernie Ecclestone had arranged for Jones to do a lap of the track before any other cars were released from the pits. Jones also had the honour of having a section of track named after him, with the Rundle Road section of the track, a 350-metre straight between turns 9 and 10, renamed as the "Jones Straight" when the circuit was in use. Jones Straight led directly onto the fast Brabham Straight.

== Qualifying ==
Official qualifying became a battle royal between the Williams-Hondas of 1982 World Champion Keke Rosberg and his teammate Nigel Mansell, and the Lotus-Renault of Ayrton Senna. Rosberg took the honors on Friday with a lap of 1:22.402, only 0.001 faster than Senna, with Mansell a further 0.161 back in third. During final qualifying, Mansell looked to have pole position wrapped up with a lap of 1:20.537 in his Williams FW10, with Senna second with Rosberg another three-tenths further back in third. Senna was out on his third run with only minutes left before the end of qualifying in his black and gold Lotus 97T, powered by a special Renault qualifying engine rumored to be putting out some 1,150 bhp (858 kW; 1,166 PS), and stunned everyone with a time of 1:19.843, seven-tenths faster than Mansell, to grab his 7th pole position of the season. As such, Senna was the only driver to record a time under 1:20- and he went out again but could not get anywhere near that time again.

World Champion designate Alain Prost was 4th on the grid in his McLaren TAG-Porsche, the Ferrari of 1985 World Championship runner up Michele Alboreto fifth, and Marc Surer in his Brabham-BMW rounding out the top six qualifiers. Outgoing World Champion Niki Lauda was 16th on the grid in his McLaren. Alan Jones ended up 19th on the grid after engine and turbo problems throughout practice and qualifying.

The slowest qualifier for the race, Huub Rothengatter in the Osella-Alfa Romeo, was 10.473 seconds slower than Senna with a time of 1:30.319. With only 25 cars appearing for the race (the RAM and Zakspeed teams did not contest the last two races of the season - indeed RAM would never race Formula One again), all cars that attended qualified for the start.

== Race ==
The race of high attrition, which was run in 35 °C (95 °F) heat, was won by Rosberg driving the Williams-Honda; it would turn out to be the last victory (and last fastest lap) of his Formula One career. Rosberg was the only front running driver to finish strongly and one of only eight cars to be classified. It was the fifth and final Grand Prix win of Rosberg's career and confirmed his status as a street race specialist with three of his previous four wins being on the streets of Monaco (1983), Dallas (1984), and Detroit earlier in the 1985 season. Rosberg had some technical problems which could have lost him the race, his race engineer, Frank Dernie suggested a strategy to minimise loss of time. Rosberg gave the winner's trophy to Dernie.

On the penultimate lap, Ligier-Renault driver Philippe Streiff tried to overtake his senior team-mate Jacques Laffite for second place and, as result of this manoeuvre, Streiff's front wheel axle was severely damaged. With fourth placed Ivan Capelli a lap down in his Tyrrell-Renault, Streiff managed to limp his Ligier JS25 home and retain third place despite having only three wheels firmly attached to the car, with the front left wheel bouncing up and down over the course of the last lap, but somehow remaining attached to the car. It would remain a career best finish for Streiff. Ligier team boss Guy Ligier, not impressed that Streiff had almost taken out both team cars at the end of the race when they were both assured of a podium finish, would not offer the Frenchman a drive for 1986. It turned out to be Streiff's only career podium.

A delayed Stefan Johansson finished fifth in his Ferrari ahead of Gerhard Berger in his Arrows-BMW. Berger at that stage of his career was also a part-time factory touring car driver for BMW in the European Touring Car Championship (he had won the Spa 24 Hours for BMW's Schnitzer Motorsport in July 1985). He performed double duty during the AGP weekend, also driving a BMW 635 CSi during the Group A support race. This was actually a breach of Formula One's driver rules which stated a driver must not drive another type of race car or in another motor race within the 24 hours before the start of a Grand Prix. As the Group A race was scheduled to start on the Saturday afternoon one hour after F1 qualifying had finished, Berger had to obtain permission from FISA, FOCA, and his Arrows team boss Jackie Oliver to race the BMW. As it turned out, his touring car race lasted 3 laps before he was punted into the gravel trap at the end of the pit straight by the Holden Dealer Team Commodore of John Harvey. The only other race finishers were Huub Rothengatter (Osella) and Pierluigi Martini (Minardi), both of whom were four laps behind Rosberg. Martin Brundle's Tyrrell was running at the end, but Brundle was 33 laps down on Rosberg and was not classified as a finisher.

Renault had a largely forgettable weekend in their last Grand Prix as a manufacturer (until 2002). Patrick Tambay, whose Renault RE60B was fitted with an on-board camera during practice and qualifying, qualified 8th while Derek Warwick qualified in 12th place. After Friday's qualifying, Tambay visited Adelaide's major dirt track racing venue Speedway Park which was hosting the inaugural Australian Sprintcar Masters meeting and while there turned a few laps of the ¼ mile clay oval track in a 700 hp (522 kW; 710 PS) V8 Sprint Car. Warwick did the same thing on the Saturday night of the two night meeting. However, unlike Berger in the Group A race, Warwick did not have permission to drive the winged sprint car within the 24 hours before the race time period and was hit with a hefty fine by the governing body FISA (despite Warwick only driving a few laps and not actually racing). In their last race both Renaults retired with transmission failure, Tambay on lap 21 and Warwick on lap 58.

All 25 cars present qualified for the race. With RAM Racing (who pulled out of F1 altogether after the European Grand Prix) and Zakspeed (who only ran the European races in 1985) not making the journey to Australia, there would not be a cut-off based on grid numbers. Early in the race Elio de Angelis, driving in his last race for Lotus, was disqualified for regaining his original grid position after being delayed on the parade lap. de Angelis later confessed that in the heat of the moment he simply forgot the rules.

The race was the 100th World Championship start for 1980 World Champion Alan Jones. Jones (along with Alain Prost) was one of two drivers to have won the Australian Grand Prix previously (Jones in 1980 and Prost in 1982). Jones' Lola retired on lap 21 with failed electrics following a typically fiery drive through to 6th place after stalling at the start and being dead last at the end of the first lap, while Prost retired with engine failure on lap 27. It was also the last race for outgoing world champion Niki Lauda. His McLaren ended in the fence with damage to the front left after a brake failure at the end of the long Brabham Straight.

Fittingly Lauda's career ended while he was in the lead of a Grand Prix. Lauda and race winner Rosberg were the only drivers in the field who had actually competed in the non-championship 1984 Australian Grand Prix which was held for Formula Pacific cars. Lauda had also failed to finish the 1984 race while Rosberg had finished second behind Brazilian Roberto Moreno.

Both Alfa Romeo and Renault had their last Grand Prix as a constructor in the turbo era. As of 2024, Alfa have never returned to Grand Prix racing as a factory team; the Alfa team that competed in F1 from 1982 to 1985 was actually a pseudo-factory team actually run by EuroRacing with support from the Alfa factory, and the Alfa team that competed in F1 from 2019 to 2023 was a rebranded Sauber with Alfa Romeo providing technical assistance with the hope that Alfa Romeo will be a works team in the near future. Renault would return in 2002 following their purchase the Benetton team. It was also the last Grand Prix for the Toleman team under the Toleman name. The team would continue in 1986 but would be renamed Benetton after being purchased by their main sponsors, the Italian clothes manufacturer Benetton Group. All six cars (the Alfa Romeo 184TB's of Riccardo Patrese and Eddie Cheever, the Renault RE60B's of Patrick Tambay and Derek Warwick, and the Hart powered Toleman TG185's of Teo Fabi and Piercarlo Ghinzani) failed to finish the last F1 race for their teams.

== Championship permutations ==
McLaren-TAG Porsche and Ferrari came into this race fighting for the Constructor's Championship

- McLaren-TAG Porsche (90pts) needed either
  - 2nd (or 3rd and 6th) or better
  - 4th (or 5th and 6th) with the Ferraris 1st and 3rd or lower
  - 5th with the Ferraris 1st and 4th or lower
  - 6th with the Ferraris 1st and 5th or lower
  - the Ferraris scoring 1st and 6th or lower
- Ferrari (80pts) needed either
  - 1st and 2nd with the McLarens scoring fewer than 5pts
  - 1st and 3rd with the McLarens scoring fewer than 3pts
  - 1st and 4th with the McLarens 6th or lower
  - 1st and 5th with the McLarens 7th or lower

As no Ferrari won the race, McLaren-TAG clinched their second consecutive title

== Classification ==
=== Qualifying ===
Pos	No	Driver	Constructor	Q1	Q2	Gap
1	12	(Brazil) Ayrton Senna	Lotus-Renault	1:22.403	1:19.844	—
2	5	(United Kingdom) Nigel Mansell	Williams-Honda	1:22.564	1:20.537	+0.703
3	6	(Finland) Keke Rosberg	Williams-Honda	1:22.402	1:21.877	+2.044
4	2	(France) Alain Prost	McLaren-TAG	1:23.943	1:21.889	+2.056
5	27	(Italy) Michele Alboreto	Ferrari	1:24.666	1:22.337	+2.504
6	8	(Switzerland) Marc Surer	Brabham-BMW	1:24.404	1:22.561	+2.728
7	17	(Austria) Gerhard Berger	Arrows-BMW	1:25.362	1:22.592	+2.759
8	15	(France) Patrick Tambay	Renault	1:25.173	1:22.683	+2.850
9	7	(Brazil) Nelson Piquet	Brabham-BMW	1:23.018	1:22.718	+2.885
10	11	(Italy) Elio de Angelis	Lotus-Renault	1:24.543	1:23.077	+3.244
11	18	(Belgium) Thierry Boutsen	Arrows-BMW	1:23.943	1:23.196	+3.363
12	16	(United Kingdom) Derek Warwick	Renault	1:24.372	1:23.426	+3.593
13	23	(United States) Eddie Cheever	Alfa Romeo	1:23.597	1:24.295	+3.764
14	22	(Italy) Riccardo Patrese	Alfa Romeo	1:23.758	1:24.128	+3.925
15	28	(Sweden) Stefan Johansson	Ferrari	1:24.732	1:23.902	+4.069
16	1	(Austria) Niki Lauda	McLaren-TAG	1:24.691	1:23.941	+4.108
17	3	(United Kingdom) Martin Brundle	Tyrrell-Renault	1:25.646	1:24.241	+4.408
18	25	(France) Philippe Streiff	Ligier-Renault	1:26.618	1:24.266	+4.433
19	33	(Australia) Alan Jones	Lola-Hart	1:25.780	1:24.369	+4.536
20	26	(France) Jacques Laffite	Ligier-Renault	1:26.972	1:24.830	+4.997
21	20	(Italy) Piercarlo Ghinzani	Toleman-Hart	1:25.021	1:26.630	+5.188
22	4	(Italy) Ivan Capelli	Tyrrell-Renault	1:27.120		+7.287
23	29	(Italy) Pierluigi Martini	Minardi-Motori Moderni	1:27.196	1:27.402	+7.363
24	19	(Italy) Teo Fabi	Toleman-Hart	1:28.261	1:28.110	+8.277
25	24	(Netherlands) Huub Rothengatter	Osella-Alfa Romeo	1:30.319		+10.486

=== Race ===
Pos	No	Driver	Constructor	Tyre	Laps	Time/Retired	Grid	Points
1	6	(Finland) Keke Rosberg	Williams-Honda	G	82	2:00:40.473	3	9
2	26	(France) Jacques Laffite	Ligier-Renault	P	82	+ 43.130	20	6
3	25	(France) Philippe Streiff	Ligier-Renault	P	82	+ 1:28.536	18	4
4	4	(Italy) Ivan Capelli	Tyrrell-Renault	G	81	+ 1 lap	22	3
5	28	(Sweden) Stefan Johansson	Ferrari	G	81	+ 1 lap	15	2
6	17	(Austria) Gerhard Berger	Arrows-BMW	G	81	+ 1 lap	7	1
7	24	(Netherlands) Huub Rothengatter	Osella-Alfa Romeo	P	78	+ 4 laps	25	
8	29	(Italy) Pierluigi Martini	Minardi-Motori Moderni	P	78	+ 4 laps	23	
Ret	12	(Brazil) Ayrton Senna	Lotus-Renault	G	62	Engine	1	
Ret	27	(Italy) Michele Alboreto	Ferrari	G	61	Transmission	5	
Ret	1	(Austria) Niki Lauda	McLaren-TAG	G	57	Brakes	16	
Ret	16	(United Kingdom) Derek Warwick	Renault	G	57	Transmission	12	
NC	3	(United Kingdom) Martin Brundle	Tyrrell-Renault	G	49	+ 33 laps	17	
Ret	8	(Switzerland) Marc Surer	Brabham-BMW	P	42	Engine	6	
Ret	22	(Italy) Riccardo Patrese	Alfa Romeo	G	42	Exhaust	14	
Ret	19	(Italy) Teo Fabi	Toleman-Hart	P	40	Engine	24	
Ret	18	(Belgium) Thierry Boutsen	Arrows-BMW	G	37	Oil Leak	11	
Ret	20	(Italy) Piercarlo Ghinzani	Toleman-Hart	P	28	Clutch	21	
Ret	2	(France) Alain Prost	McLaren-TAG	G	26	Engine	4	
Ret	15	(France) Patrick Tambay	Renault	G	20	Transmission	8	
Ret	33	(Australia) Alan Jones	Lola-Hart	G	20	Electrical	19	
DSQ	11	(Italy) Elio de Angelis	Lotus-Renault	G	18	Illegal start	10	
Ret	7	(Brazil) Nelson Piquet	Brabham-BMW	P	14	Fire	9	
Ret	23	(United States) Eddie Cheever	Alfa Romeo	G	5	Engine	13	
Ret	5	(United Kingdom) Nigel Mansell	Williams-Honda	G	1	Transmission	2	

== Championship standings after the race ==
Drivers' Championship standings

Pos	Driver	Points
1	(France) Alain Prost	73 (76)
2	(Italy) Michele Alboreto	53
3	(Finland) Keke Rosberg	40
4	(Brazil) Ayrton Senna	38
5	(Italy) Elio de Angelis	33

Constructors' Championship standings

Pos	Constructor	Points
1	(United Kingdom) McLaren-TAG	90
2	(Italy) Ferrari	82
3	(United Kingdom) Williams-Honda	71
4	(United Kingdom) Lotus-Renault	71
5	(United Kingdom) Brabham-BMW	26

- Note: Only the top five positions are included for both sets of standings. Only the best 11 results counted towards the Drivers' Championship. Numbers without parentheses are Championship points; numbers in parentheses are total points scored.

== Cultural notes ==
In Adelaide's northern industrial suburb Wingfield, a connected group of streets bears the names of the 1985 pole-sitter and the 6 points scorers: Senna, Rosberg, Laffite, Streiff, Capelli, Johansson and Berger Roads.

Previous race: 1985 South African Grand Prix	FIA Formula One World Championship; 1985 season	Next race: 1986 Brazilian Grand Prix
Previous race: 1984 Australian Grand Prix	Australian Grand Prix	Next race: 1986 Australian Grand Prix
Awards
Preceded by 1984 Detroit Grand Prix	Formula One Promotional Trophy for Race Promoter; 1985	Succeeded by 1986 Mexican Grand Prix
