= Serena Bute =

British fashion designer and model

Serena Solitaire Crichton-Stuart, Marchioness of Bute (born 29 December 1959), also known by her maiden name Serena Wendell, is a British fashion designer and former model. Through her father, she is descended from the Lee family of Virginia.

== Early life ==
Born in December 1959, Bute is the daughter of Major Jac Wendell (1924–2005), of the Grenadier Guards (grandson of the American actor Jacob Wendell, and nephew of Catherine Mommand, sometime Countess of Carnarvon), and his wife Anthea Peronelle Maxwell-Hyslop, sister of the Conservative politician Robin Maxwell-Hyslop. She was brought up in London and rural Wales by her mother and stepfather, Peter Rees, Baron Rees, and after a French finishing school became a fashion model.

== Career ==
Working in the world of fashion, Serena Wendell soon began designing and making clothes herself, launching some small fashion labels and selling to friends. She eventually established her own serious label, Serena Bute, and in 2023 was a director of Rowanwood Ltd, Deltawood Ltd, and Serena Bute Ltd. The guiding principle of the Serena Bute label is "elegant comfort". Bute's collections include wide-legged trousers, always with a grosgrain stripe. Shirts are large and tailored, made of silk, velvet, and cotton. Woollen cloths and wool-silk fabrics are supplied by Bute Fabrics, a long-established upholstery firm founded by her late husband's grandfather the 5th Marquess of Bute.

The Serena Bute label is reported as a favourite of Kate Moss, Emma Watson, Rita Ora, and Adwoa Aboah.

== Personal life ==
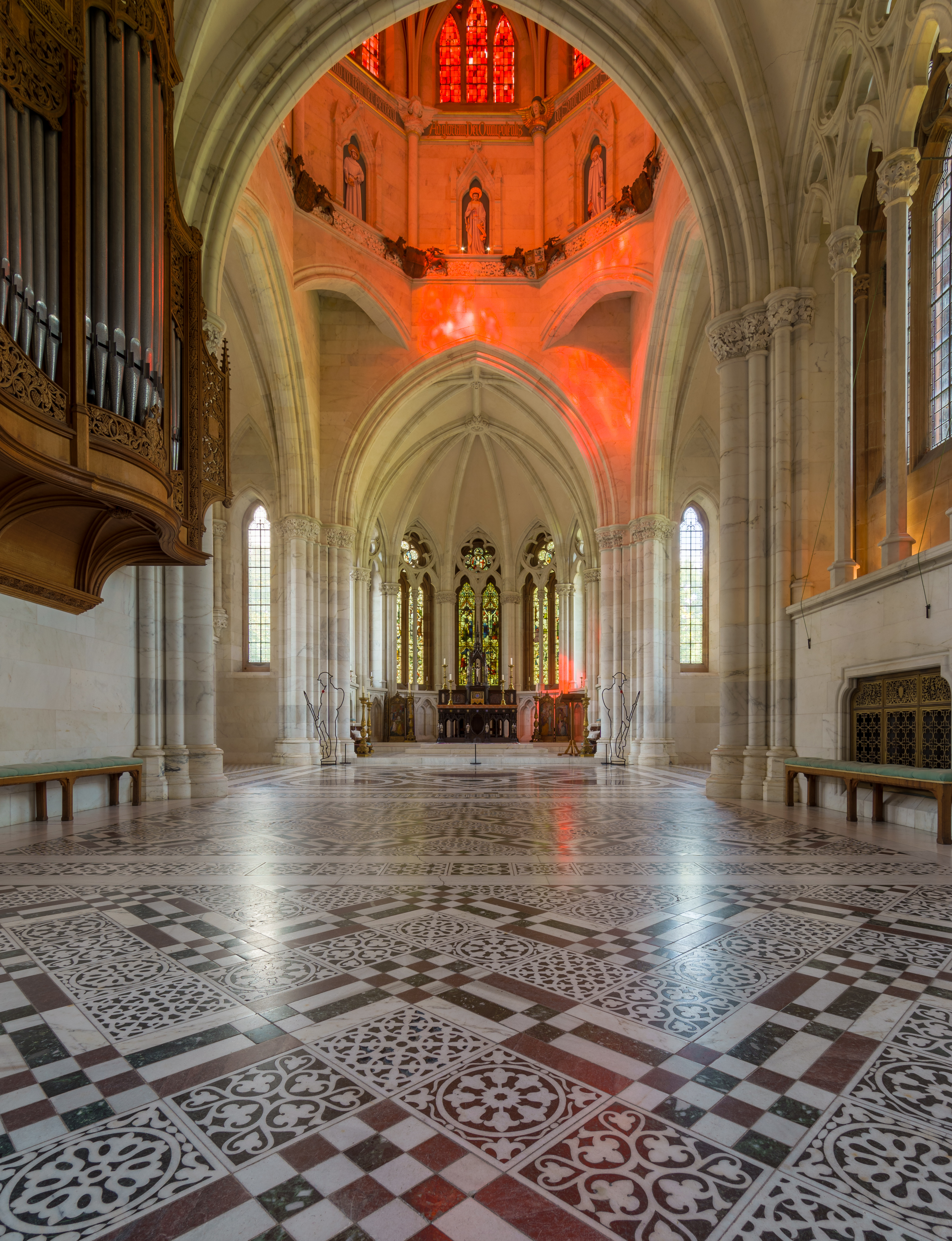
The Mount Stuart House chapel

Serena Wendell married firstly Robert de Lisser, and they had two children, Jazzy and Joshua de Lisser. They settled in Jamaica and were together for ten years. After they separated, she spent eighteen months bringing up the children alone in Jamaica, then returned to England for medical help with Hepatitis C. She commented in 2020 that she did not then know where her first husband was.

Secondly, on 13 February 1999, in the marble chapel at Mount Stuart House, on the island of Bute, she married as his second wife John Crichton-Stuart, 7th Marquess of Bute, with whom she has a daughter, Lola (born 23 Jun 1999). She was reported to be four months pregnant at the time. Until his death in March 2021, they shared a house in Regent's Park and also had the use of Mount Stuart House, but did not live there, preferring a renovated farmhouse, Ardscalpsie, six miles from Rothesay on the west coast of Bute.
