= 1986 Australian Grand Prix =

Race 16 of 16 in the 1986 Formula One World Championship
← Previous race	Next race →

Race details
- Date: 26 October 1986
- Official name: LI Foster's Australian Grand Prix
- Location: Adelaide Street Circuit; Adelaide, South Australia
- Course: Temporary street circuit
- Course length: 3.779 km (2.348 miles)
- Distance: 82 laps, 309.878 km (192.549 miles)
- Weather: Sunny

Pole position
Driver	(United Kingdom) Nigel Mansell	Williams-Honda
- Time: 1:18.403

Fastest lap
Driver	(Brazil) Nelson Piquet	Williams-Honda
- Time: 1:20.787 on lap 82

Podium
First	(France) Alain Prost	McLaren-TAG
Second	(Brazil) Nelson Piquet	Williams-Honda
Third	(Sweden) Stefan Johansson	Ferrari

The 1986 Australian Grand Prix was a Formula One motor race held on 26 October 1986 at the Adelaide Street Circuit, Adelaide, Australia. It was the sixteenth and final race of the 1986 Formula One World Championship. The race decided a three-way battle for the Drivers' Championship between Brit Nigel Mansell, driving a Williams-Honda; his Brazilian teammate Nelson Piquet; and Frenchman Alain Prost, driving a McLaren-TAG.

Mansell took pole position for the race, but a poor start off the grid enabled teammate Piquet, Ayrton Senna and Keke Rosberg to overtake him and demote him to fourth by the end of the first lap.

A few laps into the race, Finland's Keke Rosberg, in his final Grand Prix, took the lead from Piquet. However, the Finn retired with a puncture on lap 63, handing the lead back to Piquet and elevating Mansell into third place, which would have been sufficient to secure the championship. One lap later, Mansell's race ended as his left-rear tyre exploded on the main straight with 19 laps remaining. The title was then between Piquet and Prost with the latter needing to finish ahead of the former to successfully defend his title. Following the tyre failures of Rosberg and Mansell, the Williams team called Piquet in for a precautionary tyre change leaving him 15 seconds behind. He made a late charge to close the gap to 4.2 seconds but Prost took victory to win his second of four titles.

It was not until the 2007 Brazilian Grand Prix that there were again three possible drivers' title contenders entering the final race of the season.

This was the final Grand Prix for 1980 World Champion Alan Jones and for 1982 World Champion Keke Rosberg.

== Background ==
Going into the race, three drivers were in contention for the World Championship. Nigel Mansell, driving a Williams-Honda, led with 70 points, while reigning champion Alain Prost, driving a McLaren-TAG, was second on 64 and Mansell's teammate Nelson Piquet was third on 63.

The Williams-Honda was superior in speed to the McLaren-TAG, with Mansell and Piquet having won nine of the previous fifteen races between them, and the team sealing the Constructors' Championship at the Portuguese Grand Prix in late September. However, Mansell and Piquet had been battling with one another and had taken points from each other on a number of occasions, while Prost's consistency had seen him accumulate points all year and thus remain in touch with the Williams drivers.

=== Championship permutations ===
After being outscored by Piquet and Prost at the preceding Mexican Grand Prix, Mansell therefore failed to prematurely secure the Drivers' Championship. Nonetheless, he went into the race in the strongest position among the three title contenders as he only needed a third place to win the championship, as opposed to his title rivals who needed to win the race in order to keep their respective title hopes alive. It was the first time in two years that the championship was decided at the final round and the first time since 1983 that three drivers were still in contention for the Drivers' Championship at the season finale. Mansell had the opportunity to both winning his first Drivers' Championship overall and becoming Britain's first World Drivers' Champion since James Hunt in 1976. If Prost won, he would have successfully defended his title, while Piquet had the chance to win his third world championship overall, becoming Brazil's most successful Formula One driver by the number of Drivers' Championships in the process, as he was tied with Emerson Fittipaldi, who won the drivers' title in 1972 and 1974.

The championship would have been won by either of the top three drivers in the following manner:

	Mansell would have won if:		
	(United Kingdom) Nigel Mansell	(France) Alain Prost	(Brazil) Nelson Piquet
Pos.	3rd or better	Any position	Any position
Pos.	4th	Any position	Any position
Pos.	5th	Any position	2nd or lower
Pos.	6th	2nd or lower	2nd or lower

	Prost would have won if:		
	(France) Alain Prost	(United Kingdom) Nigel Mansell	(Brazil) Nelson Piquet
Pos.	1st	6th or lower	Any position

	Piquet would have won if:		
	(Brazil) Nelson Piquet	(United Kingdom) Nigel Mansell	(France) Alain Prost
Pos.	1st	5th or lower	Any position

== Qualifying report ==
Qualifying saw Mansell take pole position from teammate Piquet by 0.3 seconds, with Ayrton Senna third in his Lotus, a further 0.2 seconds back. Prost was fourth but 1.2 seconds behind Mansell, followed by René Arnoux in the Ligier and Gerhard Berger in the Benetton. Completing the top ten were Keke Rosberg in the second McLaren, Philippe Alliot in the second Ligier, Michele Alboreto in the Ferrari and Philippe Streiff in the Tyrrell. Andrea de Cesaris surprised by taking eleventh, the best grid position for the Minardi team up to this point, ahead of Stefan Johansson in the second Ferrari, Teo Fabi in the second Benetton and Johnny Dumfries in the second Lotus.

Friday's qualifying was interrupted about halfway through by a sudden and heavy downpour which caught out both Patrick Tambay (Haas Lola) and Johansson who (in separate accidents) slid off the road behind the pits and across the wet, muddy grass of the Victoria Park Racecourse infield before hitting an unprotected concrete wall side on with both the Lola-Ford and the Ferrari wrecked upon impact. The wall, not previously seen as a problem as it was well off the track, had 2 rows of tyres protecting it by Saturday morning. Both drivers were OK other than general soreness and bruising.

During the morning practice, Prost had been the fastest with a 1:19.121, 4 seconds inside the lap record, faster than Mansell's Friday qualifying time, 7/10ths faster than his own Friday time and faster even than Senna's 1985 pole time. However, while others around them improved on their Friday times, neither the reigning World Champion nor his soon to be retired teammate Rosberg (who was 2nd in the morning session) could get near the morning times in the afternoon, reporting a distinct lack of grip even before Streiff's Renault blew-up and all but ruined the last 20 minutes of qualifying after he coated the racing line down the Brabham Straight and around the right hand hairpin with a good amount of Elf's finest before parking his Tyrrell off to the inside of the hairpin exit.

Home country hero Alan Jones in his last drive in Formula One was ahead of his team mate Tambay on the grid. Using a revised Ford engine, the Lola's qualified 15th and 17th, though both were over 4.3 seconds slower than Mansell's pole time.

The Australian Grand Prix also saw Tambay's Lola and the Lotus of Johnny Dumfries each carrying an onboard camera for television use. During qualifying, Martin Brundle's Tyrrell-Renault was timed at a fastest of all 205 mph (330 km/h) on the 900 metre long Brabham Straight. Due to the FISA mandated turbo boost restrictions in 1987 (4.0 Bar) and 1988 (2.5 Bar), plus the cars having Naturally aspirated engines from 1989, Brundle's speed would be the fastest ever recorded on the Adelaide Street Circuit.

=== Qualifying classification ===
Pos	No	Driver	Constructor	Q1	Q2	Gap
1	5	(United Kingdom) Nigel Mansell	Williams-Honda	1:19.255	1:18.403	
2	6	(Brazil) Nelson Piquet	Williams-Honda	1:20.088	1:18.714	+0.311
3	12	(Brazil) Ayrton Senna	Lotus-Renault	1:21.302	1:18.906	+0.503
4	1	(France) Alain Prost	McLaren-TAG	1:19.785	1:19.654	+1.251
5	25	(France) René Arnoux	Ligier-Renault	1:20.491	1:19.976	+1.573
6	20	(Austria) Gerhard Berger	Benetton-BMW	1:22.260	1:20.554	+2.151
7	2	(Finland) Keke Rosberg	McLaren-TAG	1:21.295	1:20.778	+2.375
8	26	(France) Philippe Alliot	Ligier-Renault	1:22.765	1:20.981	+2.578
9	27	(Italy) Michele Alboreto	Ferrari	1:21.709	1:21.747	+3.306
10	4	(France) Philippe Streiff	Tyrrell-Renault	1:23.262	1:21.720	+3.317
11	23	(Italy) Andrea de Cesaris	Minardi-Motori Moderni	1:23.476	1:22.012	+3.609
12	28	(Sweden) Stefan Johansson	Ferrari	1:22.050	1:22.309	+3.647
13	19	(Italy) Teo Fabi	Benetton-BMW	1:22.584	1:22.129	+3.726
14	11	(United Kingdom) Johnny Dumfries	Lotus-Renault	1:23.786	1:22.664	+4.261
15	15	(Australia) Alan Jones	Lola-Ford	24:46.383	1:22.796	+4.393
16	3	(United Kingdom) Martin Brundle	Tyrrell-Renault	1:24.061	1:23.004	+4.601
17	16	(France) Patrick Tambay	Lola-Ford	1:24.584	1:23.008	+4.605
18	24	(Italy) Alessandro Nannini	Minardi-Motori Moderni	1:25.593	1:23.052	+4.649
19	7	(Italy) Riccardo Patrese	Brabham-BMW	1:23.396	1:23.230	+4.827
20	8	(United Kingdom) Derek Warwick	Brabham-BMW	1:23.552	1:23.313	+4.910
21	14	(United Kingdom) Jonathan Palmer	Zakspeed	1:24.509	1:23.476	+5.073
22	18	(Belgium) Thierry Boutsen	Arrows-BMW	1:24.768	1:24.295	+5.892
23	29	(Netherlands) Huub Rothengatter	Zakspeed	1:25.746	1:25.181	+6.778
24	17	(West Germany) Christian Danner	Arrows-BMW	1:25.296	1:25.233	+6.831
25	21	(Italy) Piercarlo Ghinzani	Osella-Alfa Romeo	3:03.680	1:25.257	+6.855
26	22	(Canada) Allen Berg	Osella-Alfa Romeo	1:28.912	1:27.208	+8.806

== Race report ==
The prospect of a three-way battle for the Drivers' Championship crown attracted a capacity crowd of 150,000 to the Adelaide circuit.

Mansell yielded the lead to Senna's Lotus at the second corner on lap 1 and fell behind both Piquet and Rosberg on the same lap. Piquet also overtook Senna on lap 1 to take the lead but it would last only six laps as on lap 7, Rosberg took the lead from Piquet and began to build a sizeable gap between himself and the rest of the field.

On lap 23 Piquet spun, although no damage was sustained to the car, and he continued the race despite dropping back several places. Prost suffered a puncture a few laps later and he dropped to fourth position after having to pit. Piquet charged back through the field, passing Mansell for second place on lap 44, but Prost closed on the two Williams cars and, with 25 laps to go, all three championship contenders were running together in positions 2, 3 and 4.

The battle became one for the lead on lap 63 when Rosberg suffered a right rear tyre failure and retired from the race. Rosberg later revealed that he would never have won the race anyway unless Prost failed to finish or had sufficient problem not to be able to challenge, as he had promised Prost and the team that he would give best to his teammate to help his bid to win back-to-back championships. Prost had just passed Mansell for third which became second when Rosberg retired, with Piquet now leading. Mansell only needed a third-place finish to win the championship.

Mansell was still in third position when, on lap 64, his left rear tyre exploded at 290 km/h (180 mph) on the high-speed Brabham Straight as he was lapping Alliot's Ligier, sending a shower of sparks flying behind him and severely damaging his left rear suspension. The Williams coasted to a stop in the run-off area at the end of the straight, Mansell managing to avoid hitting anything. Fearing the same happening to the second car, Williams called Piquet to the pits and Prost took the lead. Piquet would make a late charge, closing the gap from 15.484 seconds with 2 laps remaining to just 4.205 at the finish and Prost claimed both the race and the World Championship. Prost had so little fuel left that he pulled up only metres past the finish line.

In his last race for Ferrari, Johansson completed the podium in third place, albeit a lap down on Prost and Piquet. Martin Brundle ran out of fuel as he crossed the line in fourth place in his Tyrrell. His teammate Streiff was classified fifth, two laps down, with Dumfries taking the final point in his Lotus.

By winning, Prost became the first and so far only driver to ever win the Australian Grand Prix in both non-championship and World Championship form, having won the non-championship 1982 Australian Grand Prix run for Formula Pacific cars at the Calder Park Raceway in Melbourne.

This was the last race for the Renault turbo engine, the French company being the pioneers in Formula One turbocharging back in 1977, as well as Renault's last F1 race as an engine supplier until their return with Williams in 1989. It was also the last F1 race for two former World Champions, 1980 champion Alan Jones and 1982 champion Rosberg, as well as the last race for Patrick Tambay, Dumfries, Allen Berg and Huub Rothengatter, and for Team Haas, whom both Jones and Tambay drove for.

=== Race classification ===
Pos	No	Driver	Constructor	Tyre	Laps	Time/Retired	Grid	Points
1	1	(France) Alain Prost	McLaren-TAG	G	82	1:54:20.388	4	9
2	6	(Brazil) Nelson Piquet	Williams-Honda	G	82	+4.205	2	6
3	28	(Sweden) Stefan Johansson	Ferrari	G	81	+1 lap	12	4
4	3	(United Kingdom) Martin Brundle	Tyrrell-Renault	G	81	+1 lap	16	3
5	4	(France) Philippe Streiff	Tyrrell-Renault	G	80	Out of fuel	10	2
6	11	(United Kingdom) Johnny Dumfries	Lotus-Renault	G	80	+2 laps	14	1
7	25	(France) René Arnoux	Ligier-Renault	P	79	+3 laps	5	
8	26	(France) Philippe Alliot	Ligier-Renault	P	79	+3 laps	8	
9	14	(United Kingdom) Jonathan Palmer	Zakspeed	G	77	+5 laps	21	
10	19	(Italy) Teo Fabi	Benetton-BMW	P	77	+5 laps	13	
NC	16	(France) Patrick Tambay	Lola-Ford	G	70	+12 laps	17	
Ret	5	(United Kingdom) Nigel Mansell	Williams-Honda	G	63	Tyre	1	
Ret	7	(Italy) Riccardo Patrese	Brabham-BMW	P	63	Electrical	19	
Ret	2	(Finland) Keke Rosberg	McLaren-TAG	G	62	Tyre	7	
NC	22	(Canada) Allen Berg	Osella-Alfa Romeo	P	61	+21 laps	26	
Ret	8	(United Kingdom) Derek Warwick	Brabham-BMW	P	57	Brakes	20	
Ret	17	(West Germany) Christian Danner	Arrows-BMW	G	52	Engine	24	
Ret	18	(Belgium) Thierry Boutsen	Arrows-BMW	G	50	Engine	22	
Ret	12	(Brazil) Ayrton Senna	Lotus-Renault	G	43	Engine	3	
Ret	23	(Italy) Andrea de Cesaris	Minardi-Motori Moderni	P	40	Mechanical	11	
Ret	20	(Austria) Gerhard Berger	Benetton-BMW	P	40	Engine	6	
Ret	29	(Netherlands) Huub Rothengatter	Zakspeed	G	29	Suspension	23	
Ret	15	(Australia) Alan Jones	Lola-Ford	G	16	Engine	15	
Ret	24	(Italy) Alessandro Nannini	Minardi-Motori Moderni	P	10	Accident	18	
Ret	21	(Italy) Piercarlo Ghinzani	Osella-Alfa Romeo	P	2	Transmission	25	
Ret	27	(Italy) Michele Alboreto	Ferrari	G	0	Collision	9	

== Championship standings after the race ==
- **Bold text** indicates the World Champions.

Drivers' Championship standings

Pos	Driver	Points
1	(France) **Alain Prost**	72 (74)
2	(United Kingdom) Nigel Mansell	70 (72)
3	(Brazil) Nelson Piquet	69
4	(Brazil) Ayrton Senna	55
5	(Sweden) Stefan Johansson	23

Constructors' Championship standings

Pos	Constructor	Points
1	(United Kingdom) **Williams-Honda**	141
2	(United Kingdom) McLaren-TAG	96
3	(United Kingdom) Lotus-Renault	58
4	(Italy) Ferrari	37
5	(France) Ligier-Renault	29

- Note: Only the top five positions are included for both sets of standings.

Previous race: 1986 Mexican Grand Prix	FIA Formula One World Championship; 1986 season	Next race: 1987 Brazilian Grand Prix
Previous race: 1985 Australian Grand Prix	Australian Grand Prix	Next race: 1987 Australian Grand Prix
