= 1986 Italian Grand Prix =

- Race 13 of 16 in the 1986 Formula One World Championship
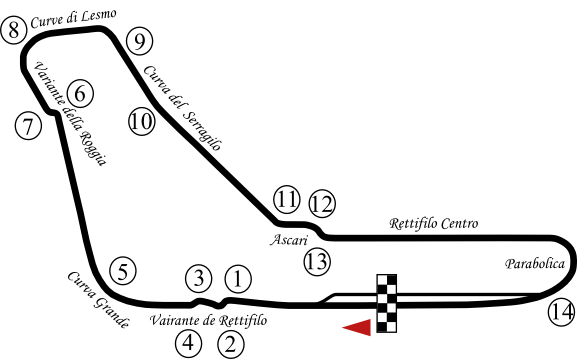

Race details
- Date: 7 September 1986
- Official name: 57º Gran Premio d'Italia
- Location: Autodromo Nazionale di Monza, Monza
- Course: Permanent racing facility
- Course length: 5.800 km (3.60 miles)
- Distance: 51 laps, 295.800 km (183.600 miles)
- Weather: Dry

Pole position
| Driver | (Italy) Teo Fabi | Benetton-BMW |
- Time: 1:24.078

Fastest lap
| Driver | (Italy) Teo Fabi | Benetton-BMW |
- Time: 1:28.099 on lap 35

Podium
| First | (Brazil) Nelson Piquet | Williams-Honda |
| Second | (United Kingdom) Nigel Mansell | Williams-Honda |
| Third | (Sweden) Stefan Johansson | Ferrari |

The 1986 Italian Grand Prix was a Formula One motor race held at Monza on 7 September 1986. It was the thirteenth race of the 1986 Formula One World Championship.

The 51-lap race was won by Brazilian driver Nelson Piquet, driving a Williams-Honda. Piquet's British teammate and Drivers' Championship rival, Nigel Mansell, finished second, with Swede Stefan Johansson third in a Ferrari. The other two championship challengers, Frenchman Alain Prost and Brazilian Ayrton Senna, both failed to finish, Senna suffering a transmission failure in his Lotus-Renault at the very start of the race and Prost being disqualified halfway through for illegally switching to his spare McLaren-TAG after the start of the formation lap.

The win moved Piquet into second place in the Drivers' Championship, five points behind Mansell and three ahead of Prost, with three races remaining.

== Qualifying report ==
During the second qualifying session at Monza, the Benetton-BMW of Gerhard Berger was recorded as being the fastest car along the start-finish straight, with a top speed of 351.22 km/h (218.24 mph). He was followed by four more BMW-powered cars: teammate Teo Fabi, the Brabhams of Derek Warwick and Riccardo Patrese, and the Arrows of Thierry Boutsen. The fastest non-BMW powered car was the Williams-Honda of Nigel Mansell, with a top speed 10 km/h (6 mph) slower than that of Berger.

Despite this, Berger could only qualify fourth, while Fabi took his second consecutive pole position. Alain Prost lined up alongside Fabi on the front row, despite being nearly half a second slower in his McLaren-TAG and recording a top speed over 16 km/h (10 mph) slower than Berger's. Drivers' Championship leader Mansell was third, ahead of Berger, while Brazilian pair Ayrton Senna (Lotus-Renault) and Nelson Piquet (Williams-Honda) made up the third row. The top 10 was completed by Warwick, Keke Rosberg in the second McLaren, Michele Alboreto in the Ferrari and Patrese; Alboreto's position was notable as he had missed the first day of qualifying after injuring his arm in a motorcycle crash.

The race saw the debut of local driver Alex Caffi, deputising for Allen Berg at Osella, as well as the debut of the French AGS team, whose Motori Moderni-powered JH21C was driven by another local driver, Ivan Capelli. With the number of entries increased to 27 at both this race and the next race in Portugal, FISA decided to allow all the cars to start. Caffi was the beneficiary of this decision, starting 27th behind Capelli and Osella teammate Piercarlo Ghinzani.

=== Qualifying classification ===
| Pos | No | Driver | Constructor | Q1 | Q2 | Gap |
|---|---|---|---|---|---|---|
| 1 | 19 | (Italy) Teo Fabi | Benetton-BMW | 1:26.019 | 1:24.078 | |
| 2 | 1 | (France) Alain Prost | McLaren-TAG | 1:26.885 | 1:24.514 | +0.436 |
| 3 | 5 | (United Kingdom) Nigel Mansell | Williams-Honda | 1:26.181 | 1:24.882 | +0.804 |
| 4 | 20 | (Austria) Gerhard Berger | Benetton-BMW | 1:25.580 | 1:24.885 | +0.807 |
| 5 | 12 | (Brazil) Ayrton Senna | Lotus-Renault | 1:25.363 | 1:24.916 | +0.838 |
| 6 | 6 | (Brazil) Nelson Piquet | Williams-Honda | 1:26.614 | 1:25.137 | +1.059 |
| 7 | 8 | (United Kingdom) Derek Warwick | Brabham-BMW | 7:12.970 | 1:25.175 | +1.097 |
| 8 | 2 | (Finland) Keke Rosberg | McLaren-TAG | 1:26.742 | 1:25.378 | +1.300 |
| 9 | 27 | (Italy) Michele Alboreto | Ferrari | no time | 1:25.549 | +1.471 |
| 10 | 7 | (Italy) Riccardo Patrese | Brabham-BMW | 1:27.438 | 1:26.111 | +2.033 |
| 11 | 25 | (France) René Arnoux | Ligier-Renault | 1:27.928 | 1:26.187 | +2.109 |
| 12 | 28 | (Sweden) Stefan Johansson | Ferrari | 1:26.517 | 1:26.422 | +2.344 |
| 13 | 18 | (Belgium) Thierry Boutsen | Arrows-BMW | 1:28.051 | 1:26.754 | +2.676 |
| 14 | 26 | (France) Philippe Alliot | Ligier-Renault | 1:27.287 | 1:27.269 | +3.191 |
| 15 | 16 | (France) Patrick Tambay | Lola-Ford | 1:29.744 | 1:27.808 | +3.730 |
| 16 | 17 | (West Germany) Christian Danner | Arrows-BMW | 1:30.397 | 1:27.923 | +3.845 |
| 17 | 11 | (United Kingdom) Johnny Dumfries | Lotus-Renault | 1:28.857 | 1:28.024 | +3.946 |
| 18 | 15 | (Australia) Alan Jones | Lola-Ford | 7:40.132 | 1:28.403 | +3.965 |
| 19 | 24 | (Italy) Alessandro Nannini | Minardi-Motori Moderni | 1:29.239 | 1:28.690 | +4.612 |
| 20 | 3 | (United Kingdom) Martin Brundle | Tyrrell-Renault | 1:31.266 | 1:29.125 | +5.047 |
| 21 | 23 | (Italy) Andrea de Cesaris | Minardi-Motori Moderni | 1:31.375 | 1:29.561 | +5.483 |
| 22 | 14 | (United Kingdom) Jonathan Palmer | Zakspeed | 1:32.064 | 1:29.659 | +5.581 |
| 23 | 4 | (France) Philippe Streiff | Tyrrell-Renault | 1:30.199 | 1:30.976 | +6.121 |
| 24 | 29 | (Netherlands) Huub Rothengatter | Zakspeed | 1:32.726 | 1:30.904 | +6.826 |
| 25 | 31 | (Italy) Ivan Capelli | AGS-Motori Moderni | 58:12.143 | 1:33.844 | +9.766 |
| 26 | 21 | (Italy) Piercarlo Ghinzani | Osella-Alfa Romeo | 1:36.128 | 1:36.334 | +12.050 |
| 27 | 22 | (Italy) Alex Caffi | Osella-Alfa Romeo | 1:36.900 | 1:38.493 | +12.822 |

== Race report ==
Following problems at the start of the formation lap, pole position man Teo Fabi was forced to start from the back of the grid and Alain Prost, alongside him on the front row, had to start from the pit lane in the spare car. At the green light, Gerhard Berger took the lead, but on lap eight lost positions to first Mansell, Piquet, and an on-form Alboreto in the Ferrari. Ayrton Senna was out with a broken gearbox at the start. Alboreto looked to be in challenging the Williams duo for the lead having overtaken Rosberg, Arnoux and Berger before spinning at the exit of the first chicane. Like the British Grand Prix, the race became a close fight between the two Williams drivers, but this time Piquet hunted down his teammate British driver Nigel Mansell to take the victory. Piquet defeated Mansell in a straight fight, leading the Briton home by 9.828 seconds. The Brazilian managed to pass Mansell at the Curva Grande to go on and claim his fourth win of the season. Behind, Fabi and Prost had charged from the rear and by lap 12 were running 8th and 9th. Prost was disqualified for changing cars after the start of the formation lap, which was illegal, but his engine blew up a lap after he was flagged anyway. Johansson charged early in the race, passing Rosberg and Arnoux on lap five to go on to finish third. Berger survived to finish 5th one lap down, while Alan Jones scored the final point in the Haas team's anniversary race having made their F1 debut in Italy in 1985.

=== Race classification ===
| Pos | No | Driver | Constructor | Laps | Time/Retired | Grid | Points |
|---|---|---|---|---|---|---|---|
| 1 | 6 | (Brazil) Nelson Piquet | Williams-Honda | 51 | 1:17:42.889 | 6 | 9 |
| 2 | 5 | (United Kingdom) Nigel Mansell | Williams-Honda | 51 | + 9.828 | 3 | 6 |
| 3 | 28 | (Sweden) Stefan Johansson | Ferrari | 51 | + 22.915 | 12 | 4 |
| 4 | 2 | (Finland) Keke Rosberg | McLaren-TAG | 51 | + 53.809 | 8 | 3 |
| 5 | 20 | (Austria) Gerhard Berger | Benetton-BMW | 50 | + 1 lap | 4 | 2 |
| 6 | 15 | (Australia) Alan Jones | Lola-Ford | 49 | + 2 laps | 18 | 1 |
| 7 | 18 | (Belgium) Thierry Boutsen | Arrows-BMW | 49 | + 2 laps | 13 | |
| 8 | 17 | (West Germany) Christian Danner | Arrows-BMW | 49 | + 2 laps | 16 | |
| 9 | 4 | (France) Philippe Streiff | Tyrrell-Renault | 49 | + 2 laps | 23 | |
| 10 | 3 | (United Kingdom) Martin Brundle | Tyrrell-Renault | 49 | + 2 laps | 20 | |
| NC | 22 | (Italy) Alex Caffi | Osella-Alfa Romeo | 45 | + 6 laps | 27 | |
| Ret | 19 | (Italy) Teo Fabi | Benetton-BMW | 44 | Puncture | 1 | |
| Ret | 27 | (Italy) Michele Alboreto | Ferrari | 33 | Engine | 9 | |
| Ret | 23 | (Italy) Andrea de Cesaris | Minardi-Motori Moderni | 33 | Engine | 21 | |
| Ret | 31 | (Italy) Ivan Capelli | AGS-Motori Moderni | 31 | Puncture | 25 | |
| Ret | 25 | (France) René Arnoux | Ligier-Renault | 30 | Gearbox | 11 | |
| Ret | 14 | (United Kingdom) Jonathan Palmer | Zakspeed | 27 | Engine | 22 | |
| DSQ | 1 | (France) Alain Prost | McLaren-TAG | 27 | Illegal car change | 2 | |
| Ret | 26 | (France) Philippe Alliot | Ligier-Renault | 22 | Engine | 14 | |
| Ret | 11 | (United Kingdom) Johnny Dumfries | Lotus-Renault | 18 | Gearbox | 17 | |
| Ret | 8 | (United Kingdom) Derek Warwick | Brabham-BMW | 16 | Spun off | 7 | |
| Ret | 24 | (Italy) Alessandro Nannini | Minardi-Motori Moderni | 15 | Electrical | 19 | |
| Ret | 21 | (Italy) Piercarlo Ghinzani | Osella-Alfa Romeo | 12 | Suspension | 26 | |
| Ret | 16 | (France) Patrick Tambay | Lola-Ford | 2 | Accident | 15 | |
| Ret | 7 | (Italy) Riccardo Patrese | Brabham-BMW | 2 | Accident | 10 | |
| Ret | 29 | (Netherlands) Huub Rothengatter | Zakspeed | 1 | Engine | 24 | |
| Ret | 12 | (Brazil) Ayrton Senna | Lotus-Renault | 0 | Transmission | 5 | |

== Championship standings after the race ==
Drivers' Championship standings

| Pos | Driver | Points |
|---|---|---|
| 1 | (United Kingdom) Nigel Mansell | 61 |
| 2 | (Brazil) Nelson Piquet | 56 |
| 3 | (France) Alain Prost | 53 |
| 4 | (Brazil) Ayrton Senna | 48 |
| 5 | (Finland) Keke Rosberg | 22 |

Constructors' Championship standings

| Pos | Constructor | Points |
|---|---|---|
| 1 | (United Kingdom) Williams-Honda | 117 |
| 2 | (United Kingdom) McLaren-TAG | 75 |
| 3 | (United Kingdom) Lotus-Renault | 50 |
| 4 | (Italy) Ferrari | 30 |
| 5 | (France) Ligier-Renault | 28 |

- Note: Only the top five positions are included for both sets of standings.

| Previous race: 1986 Austrian Grand Prix | FIA Formula One World Championship; 1986 season | Next race: 1986 Portuguese Grand Prix |
| Previous race: 1985 Italian Grand Prix | Italian Grand Prix | Next race: 1987 Italian Grand Prix |
