= 1985 South African Grand Prix =

- Race 15 of 16 in the 1985 Formula One World Championship
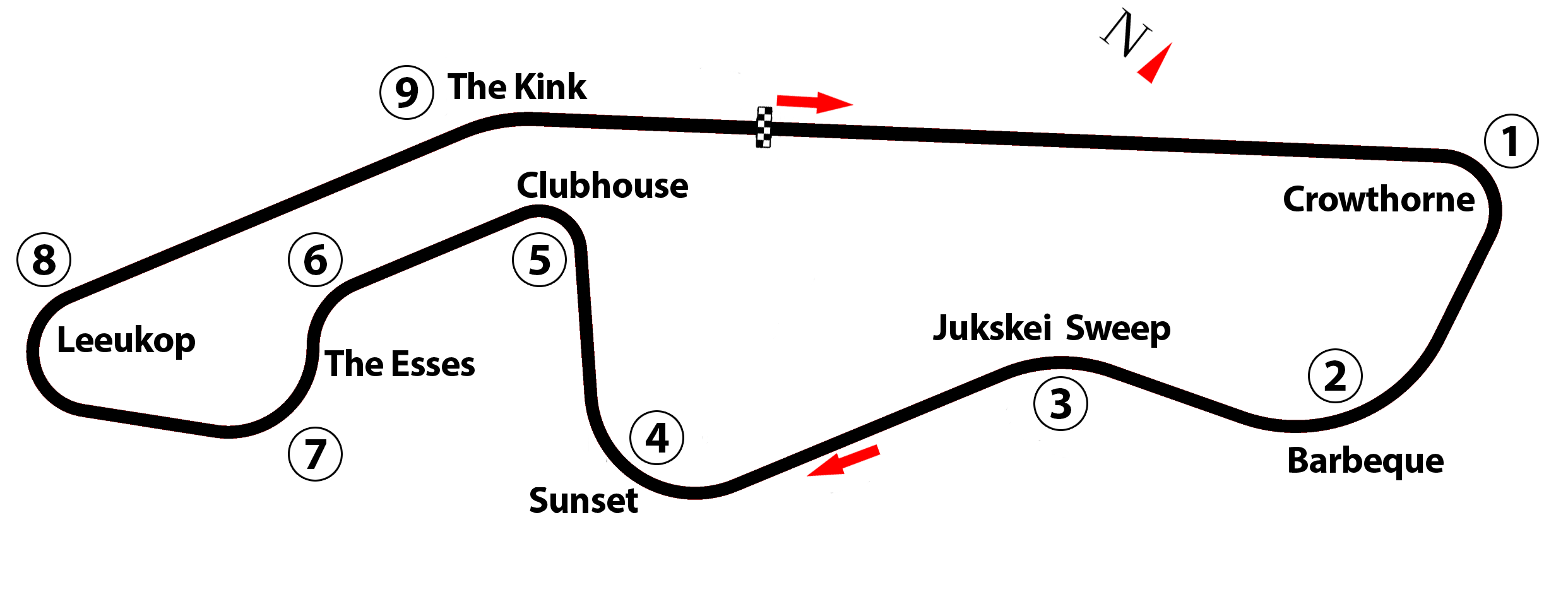

Race details
- Date: 19 October 1985
- Location: Kyalami; Transvaal Province, South Africa
- Course: Permanent racing facility
- Course length: 4.104 km (2.550 miles)
- Distance: 75 laps, 307.800 km (191.258 miles)
- Weather: Sunny, hot and dry

Pole position
Driver	(United Kingdom) Nigel Mansell	Williams-Honda
- Time: 1:02.366

Fastest lap
Driver	(Finland) Keke Rosberg	Williams-Honda
- Time: 1:08.149 on lap 74

Podium
First	(United Kingdom) Nigel Mansell	Williams-Honda
Second	(Finland) Keke Rosberg	Williams-Honda
Third	(France) Alain Prost	McLaren-TAG

The 1985 South African Grand Prix was a Formula One motor race held on 19 October 1985 at the Kyalami Circuit in South Africa. It was the fifteenth and penultimate round of the 1985 FIA Formula One World Championship.

The race was marked with some teams boycotting the event due to apartheid – the segregation of blacks and whites – and was the last South African Formula One race until apartheid ended in 1992. The race was won by Nigel Mansell in a Williams-Honda, who also took pole position.

== Report ==
Until the 2023 Las Vegas Grand Prix, this was the last World Championship Grand Prix to be held on a Saturday; it also was the last World Championship Grand Prix where laurel wreaths were given to the drivers at the podium. The event was boycotted by two teams, Ligier and Renault, owing to mounting international pressures against tolerating the country's system of apartheid. A state of emergency had been declared by the South African government in July due to growing civil unrest nationwide, and French teams Ligier and Renault's boycotts were in lockstep with the French government's boycott and sanctioning of South Africa, apparently doing so under pressure. Most of the Formula One drivers, including Alain Prost, Niki Lauda and Nigel Mansell were personally very much against racing in South Africa, but the drivers held the mentality that because they were contracted to drive at every Grand Prix, they would race at Kyalami.

Some governments tried to keep their drivers from entering the race. Brazil's sanctions on South Africa nearly prevented Nelson Piquet or Ayrton Senna from racing.

Finland and Sweden held similar reservations regarding Finn Keke Rosberg and Swede Stefan Johansson competing. Sweden's National Automobile Federation had announced Johansson could not race in South Africa before the event, but he did race.

Ayrton Senna initially said he would race if Lotus raced. However, he later said he would boycott the race.

Multiple sponsors also ordered teams to remove their branding from cars they backed, most notably Marlboro and Beatrice Foods.

The latter held an equity interest in the single car Haas Lola team. While Alan Jones qualified 18th for that team, his car was not on the starting grid. Officially Jones cited illness as to why he did not race, but it was widely rumored at the time that Beatrice ordered the team to boycott. In 2017, Jones described a meeting with Bernie Ecclestone the night before the race, who suggested that Jones feign illness the next morning and not show up. Ecclestone described how Beatrice were under pressure in the US from activists such as Jesse Jackson not to race, under threats including strike action by African Americans working in their businesses. Only Jones and team management Teddy Mayer and Carl Haas were aware of this plan. Jones said "And so, on the Saturday morning I was gone. I just didn’t turn up. They had the car out ready to go, when they were told, "AJ’s been struck down by a virus and we are not racing"."

It was the final South African Grand Prix until apartheid ended, with FISA president Jean-Marie Balestre announcing days after the race that the Grand Prix would not return to the nation for 1986 because of apartheid. Even without the political pressures, this might well have been the final Formula One race held at Kyalami in its then form: FISA had long since deemed that circuits where lap times were under 60 seconds were considered too small for Grand Prix racing and with car speeds increasing all the time, it was reasonable to conclude that lap times from 1986 would be under 60 seconds. Kyalami's pole position time had actually fallen by over 10 seconds since the 1981 race, and Mansell's 1985 pole time of 1:02.366, at an average speed of 237 km/h (147 mph), was over two and a half seconds faster than Nelson Piquet's 1984 pole time of 1:04.871.

During qualifying, the Brabham BMWs reached 332 km/h (206 mph) on the 1.65 km (1.0 mi) long front straight, just 3 km/h (2 mph) shy of their season's best at Paul Ricard in France some 3 months earlier.

The South African Grand Prix would only return in 1992, after apartheid ended, in a new configuration of the Kyalami circuit. Mansell would also win the 1992 race driving a Williams, albeit with a naturally-aspirated Renault engine.

== Classification ==
=== Qualifying ===
Pole position went to Nigel Mansell, averaging 236.898 km/h (147.201 mph).

Pos	No	Driver	Constructor	Q1	Q2	Gap
1	5	(United Kingdom) Nigel Mansell	Williams-Honda	1:03.188	1:02.366	—
2	7	(Brazil) Nelson Piquet	Brabham-BMW	1:03.844	1:02.490	+0.124
3	6	(Finland) Keke Rosberg	Williams-Honda	1:03.073	1:02.504	+0.138
4	12	(Brazil) Ayrton Senna	Lotus-Renault	1:04.517	1:02.825	+0.459
5	8	(Switzerland) Marc Surer	Brabham-BMW	1:05.411	1:04.088	+1.722
6	11	(Italy) Elio de Angelis	Lotus-Renault	1:04.611	1:04.129	+1.763
7	19	(Italy) Teo Fabi	Toleman-Hart	1:06.083	1:04.215	+1.849
8	1	(Austria) Niki Lauda	McLaren-TAG	1:05.357	1:04.283	+1.917
9	2	(France) Alain Prost	McLaren-TAG	1:05.757	1:04.376	+2.010
10	18	(Belgium) Thierry Boutsen	Arrows-BMW	1:05.079	1:04.518	+2.152
11	17	(Austria) Gerhard Berger	Arrows-BMW	1:06.546	1:04.780	+2.414
12	22	(Italy) Riccardo Patrese	Alfa Romeo	1:06.386	1:04.948	+2.582
13	20	(Italy) Piercarlo Ghinzani	Toleman-Hart	1:07.800	1:05.114	+2.748
14	23	(United States) Eddie Cheever	Alfa Romeo	1:07.159	1:05.260	+2.894
15	27	(Italy) Michele Alboreto	Ferrari	1:05.268	1:05.757	+2.902
16	28	(Sweden) Stefan Johansson	Ferrari	1:05.406	1:05.388	+3.022
17	3	(United Kingdom) Martin Brundle	Tyrrell-Renault	1:06.709	1:05.649	+3.283
18	33	(Australia) Alan Jones	Lola-Hart	1:07.144	1:05.731	+3.365
19	4	(France) Philippe Streiff	Tyrrell-Renault	1:07.935	1:06.205	+3.839
20	29	(Italy) Pierluigi Martini	Minardi-Motori Moderni	1:10.025	1:08.658	+6.292
21	24	(Netherlands) Huub Rothengatter	Osella-Alfa Romeo	1:09.904	1:09.873	+7.507

=== Race ===
Pos	No	Driver	Constructor	Laps	Time/Retired	Grid	Points
1	5	(United Kingdom) Nigel Mansell	Williams-Honda	75	1:28:22.866	1	9
2	6	(Finland) Keke Rosberg	Williams-Honda	75	+ 7.572	3	6
3	2	(France) Alain Prost	McLaren-TAG	74	+ 1 Lap	9	4
4	28	(Sweden) Stefan Johansson	Ferrari	74	+ 1 Lap	16	3
5	17	(Austria) Gerhard Berger	Arrows-BMW	74	+ 1 Lap	11	2
6	18	(Belgium) Thierry Boutsen	Arrows-BMW	74	+ 1 Lap	10	1
7	3	(United Kingdom) Martin Brundle	Tyrrell-Renault	73	+ 2 Laps	17	
Ret	11	(Italy) Elio de Angelis	Lotus-Renault	52	Engine	6	
Ret	29	(Italy) Pierluigi Martini	Minardi-Motori Moderni	45	Radiator	20	
Ret	1	(Austria) Niki Lauda	McLaren-TAG	37	Turbo	8	
Ret	4	(France) Philippe Streiff	Tyrrell-Renault	16	Accident	19	
Ret	12	(Brazil) Ayrton Senna	Lotus-Renault	8	Engine	4	
Ret	27	(Italy) Michele Alboreto	Ferrari	8	Turbo	15	
Ret	7	(Brazil) Nelson Piquet	Brabham-BMW	6	Engine	2	
Ret	20	(Italy) Piercarlo Ghinzani	Toleman-Hart	4	Engine	13	
Ret	19	(Italy) Teo Fabi	Toleman-Hart	3	Engine	7	
Ret	8	(Switzerland) Marc Surer	Brabham-BMW	3	Engine	5	
Ret	24	(Netherlands) Huub Rothengatter	Osella-Alfa Romeo	1	Electrical	21	
Ret	22	(Italy) Riccardo Patrese	Alfa Romeo	0	Collision	12	
Ret	23	(United States) Eddie Cheever	Alfa Romeo	0	Collision	14	
DNS	33	(Australia) Alan Jones	Lola-Hart		Withdrew	18	

== Championship standings after the race ==
Drivers' Championship standings

Pos	Driver	Points
1	(France) Alain Prost	73 (76)
2	(Italy) Michele Alboreto	53
3	(Brazil) Ayrton Senna	38
4	(Italy) Elio de Angelis	33
5	(United Kingdom) Nigel Mansell	31

Constructors' Championship standings

Pos	Constructor	Points
1	(United Kingdom) McLaren-TAG	90
2	(Italy) Ferrari	80
3	(United Kingdom) Lotus-Renault	71
4	(United Kingdom) Williams-Honda	62
5	(United Kingdom) Brabham-BMW	26

- Note: Only the top five positions are included for both sets of standings. Only the best 11 results counted towards the Drivers' Championship. Numbers without parentheses are Championship points; numbers in parentheses are total points scored.

Previous race: 1985 European Grand Prix	FIA Formula One World Championship; 1985 season	Next race: 1985 Australian Grand Prix
Previous race: 1984 South African Grand Prix	South African Grand Prix	Next race: 1992 South African Grand Prix
