= Philippe Streiff =

French racing driver (1955–2022)

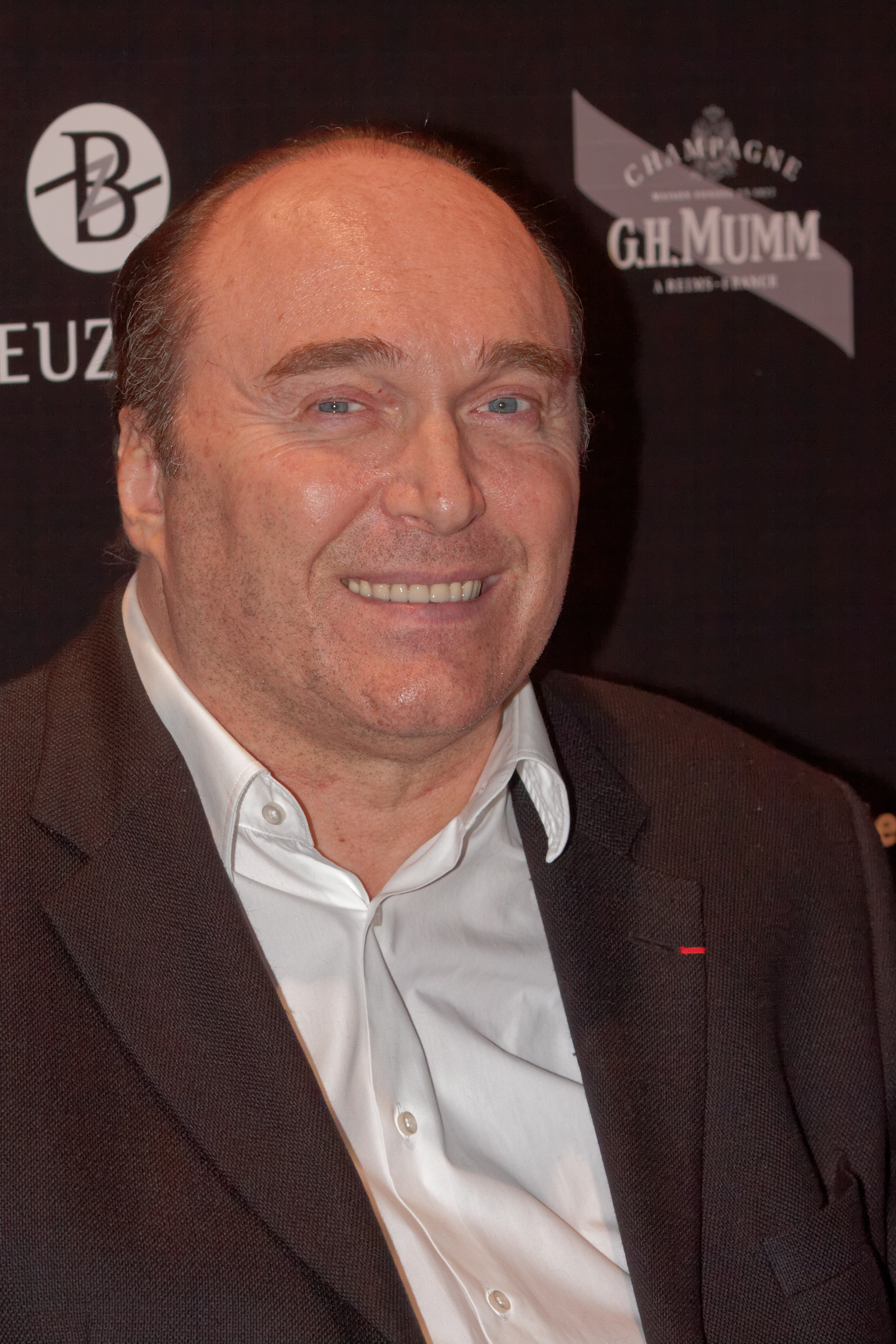
- Streiff in 2014
- Born: Philippe Pierre Streiff; 26 June 1955; La Tronche, Isère, France
- Died: 23 December 2022 (aged 67); Puteaux, Hauts-de-Seine, France

Formula One World Championship career
- Nationality: (France) French
- Active years: 1984–1989
- Team(s): Renault, Ligier, Tyrrell, AGS
- Entries: 55 (53 starts)
- Championships: 0
- Wins: 0
- Podiums: 1
- Career points: 11
- Pole positions: 0
- Fastest laps: 0
- First entry: 1984 Portuguese Grand Prix
- Last entry: 1989 Brazilian Grand Prix

24 Hours of Le Mans career
- Years: 1978, 1981, 1983–1984
- Teams: Lola, Rondeau, Ford, Porsche
- Best finish: 2nd (1981)
- Class wins: 1 (1981)

Philippe Pierre Streiff (26 June 1955 – 23 December 2022) was a French racing driver and motorsport executive, who competed in Formula One from 1984 to 1989.

== Early life and career ==
Philippe Pierre Streiff was born on 26 June 1955 in La Tronche, Isère, France.

== Formula One career ==
Streiff participated in 55 Formula One Grands Prix, debuting on 21 October 1984. He achieved one podium, and scored a total of 11 championship points.

A pre-season testing crash at the Jacarepaguá circuit in Rio de Janeiro in 1989 with AGS left Streiff a quadriplegic and thus using a wheelchair, with the quality of the care he received in the aftermath having been called into question, even if the accident itself was so serious the roll-bar broke on impact.

== Other ventures ==
Streiff organised the Masters of Paris-Bercy, a kart racing competition held in collaboration with the FFSA, from 1993 to 2001.

In early 1994, Streiff made a bid to purchase Ligier in partnership with Hugues de Chaunac. The bid had the support of the similarly Renault-powered Williams F1 team, who intended to turn Ligier into a 'junior' team. The bid was unsuccessful.

== Death ==
Streiff died on 23 December 2022 aged 67 in Puteaux, Hauts-de-Seine, five miles from the centre of Paris.

== Legacy ==
Belgian Luc Costermans, who had broken the World blind road speed record in late 2008, dedicated his record to Streiff.

== Racing record ==
=== Career summary ===
Season	Series	Team	Races	Wins	Poles	F/Laps	Podiums	Points	Position
1978	Championnat de France Formula Renault	Ecurie Motul Nogaro	14	1	0	1	6	101	5th
1978	24 Hours of Le Mans	Team Pronuptia	1	0	0	0	0	N/A	NC
1979	European Formula Three	Ecurie Motul Nogaro	7	0	0	0	0	0	13th
1979	French Formula Three	Ecurie Motul Nogaro	?	?	?	?	?	28	**2nd**
1980	European Formula Three	Ecurie Motul Nogaro	11	1	1	0	2	18	6th
1980	French Formula Three	Ecurie Motul Nogaro	2	1	0	0	2	57	**3rd**
1981	European Formula Three	Ecurie Motul Nogaro	13	0	0	1	5	36	4th
1981	French Formula Three	Ecurie Motul Nogaro	5	2	3	2	4	99	**1st**
1981	Japanese Formula Two		1	0	0	0	0	0	NC
1981	24 Hours of Le Mans	Jean Rondeau	1	0	0	0	1	N/A	**2nd**
1982	European Formula Two	Motul GPA	13	0	0	0	2	22	6th
1983	European Formula Two	Écurie Armagnac Bigorre	11	0	0	0	4	25	4th
1983	24 Hours of Le Mans	Ford France	1	0	0	0	0	N/A	DNF
1984	European Formula Two	AGS	11	1	0	0	4	27	4th
1984	Formula One	Equipe Renault Elf	1	0	0	0	0	0	NC
1984	24 Hours of Le Mans	Skoal Bandit Porsche Team	1	0	0	0	1	N/A	**3rd**
1984	24 Hours of Le Mans	John Fitzpatrick Racing	1	0	0	0	1	N/A	**3rd**
1985	International Formula 3000	AGS	10	0	0	0	1	12	8th
1985	International Formula 3000	Lola Motorsport	1	0	0	0	0	12	8th
1985	Formula One	Équipe Ligier Gitanes	4	0	0	0	1	4	15th
1985	Formula One	Tyrrell Racing Organisation	1	0	0	0	0	4	15th
1986	Formula One	Data General Team Tyrrell	16	0	0	0	0	3	14th
1987	Formula One	Data General Team Tyrrell	16	0	0	0	0	4	15th
1987	World Touring Car Championship	Eggenberger Motorsport	1	0	0	0	0	0	NC
1988	Formula One	AGS	15	0	0	0	0	0	NC
1988	World Sportscar Championship	Blaupunkt-Joest Racing	2	0	0	0	0	20	37th
1988	World Sportscar Championship	Team Sauber Mercedes	2	0	0	0	0	20	37th

=== Complete 24 Hours of Le Mans results ===
Year	Team	Co-drivers	Car	Class	Laps	Pos.	Class pos.
1978	(France) Team Pronuptia	(France) Michel Elkoubi (France) Pierre Yver	Lola T296-Cosworth	Gr.6; S 2.0	232	NC	NC
1981	(France) Jean Rondeau	(France) Jacky Haran (France) Jean-Louis Schlesser	Rondeau M379C-Cosworth	GTP (3.0)	341	**2nd**	**1st**
1983	Ford France	(France) Jean-Pierre Jaussaud	Rondeau M482-Ford Cosworth	C	12	DNF	DNF
1984	(United Kingdom) Skoal Bandit Porsche Team (United Kingdom) John Fitzpatrick Racing	(United Kingdom) David Hobbs (South Africa) Sarel van der Merwe	Porsche 956	C1	351	**3rd**	**3rd**

=== Complete European Formula Three results ===
(key) (Races in bold indicate pole position) (Races in italics indicate fastest lap)

Year	Entrant	1	2	3	4	5	6	7	8	9	10	11	12	13	14	15	Total	Points
1980	Ecurie Motul Nogaro	NÜR; 7	OST; NC	ZOL; 22	MAG; 4	ZAN; 8	LCA; 7	MUG	MIS; Ret	KNU; 5	SIL; DNA	JAR; 9	KAC; 3	ZOL; 1			6th	18
1981	Ecurie Motul Nogaro	VAL; DNQ	NÜR; Ret	DON; 9	OST; 6	ZOL; 2	MAG; 4	LCA; 4	ZAN; 3	SIL; DNA	CET; 5	MIS; 4	KNU; 3	JAR; Ret	IMO; 2	MUG; 3	4th	36

=== Complete European Formula Two Championship results ===
(key) (Races in bold indicate pole position; races in italics indicate fastest lap)

Year	Entrant	Chassis	Engine	1	2	3	4	5	6	7	8	9	10	11	12	13	Pos	Pts
1982	Motul GPA	AGS	BMW	SIL; 10	HOC; Ret	THR; 5	NÜR; Ret	MUG; Ret	VLL; 2	PAU; Ret	SPA; 4	HOC; Ret	DON; 5	MAN; 2	PER; 4	MIS; Ret	6th	22
1983	Écurie Armagnac Bigorre	AGS	BMW	SIL; 5	THR; 8	HOC; Ret	NÜR	VLL; 5	PAU; 8	JAR; 4	DON; 3	MIS; Ret	PER; 2	ZOL; 3	MUG; 3		4th	25
1984	Automobiles Gonfaronnaises Sportives	AGS	BMW	SIL; Ret	HOC; 5	THR; 3	VLL; Ret	MUG; 11	PAU; 2	HOC; Ret	MIS; 2	PER; Ret	DON; 7	BRH; 1			4th	27

=== Complete International Formula 3000 Championship results ===
(key) (Races in bold indicate pole position; races in italics indicate fastest lap)

Year	Entrant	Chassis	Engine	1	2	3	4	5	6	7	8	9	10	11	12	Pos.	Pts
1985	Automobiles Gonfaronnaises Sportives	AGS JH20	Cosworth	SIL; Ret	THR; Ret	EST; 10	NÜR	VLL; 5	PAU; 5	SPA; Ret	DIJ; 9		ÖST; 5	ZAN; 3	DON; 5	8th	12
1985	Lola Motorsport	Lola T950	Cosworth									PER; Ret				8th	12

=== Complete Formula One results ===
(key)

Year	Entrant	Chassis	Engine	1	2	3	4	5	6	7	8	9	10	11	12	13	14	15	16	WDC	Points
1984	Equipe Renault Elf	Renault RE50	Renault V6	BRA	RSA	BEL	SMR	FRA	MON	CAN	DET	DAL	GBR	GER	AUT	NED	ITA	EUR	POR; Ret	NC	0
1985	Équipe Ligier Gitanes	Ligier JS25	Renault V6	BRA	POR	SMR	MON	CAN	DET	FRA	GBR	GER	AUT	NED	ITA; 10	BEL; 9	EUR; 8		AUS; 3	15th	4
1985	Tyrrell Racing Organisation	Tyrrell 014	Renault V6															RSA; Ret		15th	4
1986	Data General Team Tyrrell	Tyrrell 014	Renault V6	BRA; 7	ESP; Ret	SMR; Ret			CAN; 11											14th	3
1986	Data General Team Tyrrell	Tyrrell 015	Renault V6				MON; 11	BEL; 12		DET; 9	FRA; Ret	GBR; 6	GER; Ret	HUN; 8	AUT; Ret	ITA; 9	POR; Ret	MEX; Ret	AUS; 5	14th	3
1987	Data General Team Tyrrell	Tyrrell DG016	Cosworth V8	BRA; 11	SMR; 8	BEL; 9	MON; Ret	DET; 14	FRA; 6	GBR; Ret	GER; 4	HUN; 9	AUT; Ret	ITA; 12	POR; 12	ESP; 7	MEX; 8	JPN; 12	AUS; Ret	15th	4
1988	Automobiles Gonfaronnaises Sportives	AGS JH23	Cosworth V8	BRA; Ret	SMR; 10	MON; Ret	MEX; 12	CAN; Ret	DET; Ret	FRA; Ret	GBR; Ret	GER; Ret	HUN; Ret	BEL; 10	ITA; Ret	POR; 9	ESP; Ret	JPN; 8	AUS; 11	NC	0
1989	Automobiles Gonfaronnaises Sportives	AGS JH23B	Cosworth V8	BRA; DNA	SMR	MON	MEX	USA	CAN	FRA	GBR	GER	HUN	BEL	ITA	POR	ESP	JPN	AUS	NC	0

== Notes and references ==
Sporting positions
Preceded by Alain Ferté	French Formula Three; Champion; 1981	Succeeded by Pierre Petit
