= 1986 Mexican Grand Prix =

- Race 15 of 16 in the 1986 Formula One World Championship

Race details
- Date: October 12, 1986
- Official name: Gran Premio de Mexico
- Location: Autódromo Hermanos Rodríguez, Mexico City, Mexico
- Course: Permanent circuit
- Course length: 4.421 km (2.747 miles)
- Distance: 68 laps, 300.628 km (186.802 miles)
- Weather: Sunny and hot

Pole position
| Driver | (Brazil) Ayrton Senna | Lotus-Renault |
- Time: 1:16.990

Fastest lap
| Driver | (Brazil) Nelson Piquet | Williams-Honda |
- Time: 1:19.360 on lap 64

Podium
| First | (Austria) Gerhard Berger | Benetton-BMW |
| Second | (France) Alain Prost | McLaren-TAG |
| Third | (Brazil) Ayrton Senna | Lotus-Renault |

The 1986 Mexican Grand Prix was a Formula One motor race held at Mexico City on October 12, 1986.

The first Mexican Grand Prix since 1970 was held at the newly renamed Autódromo Hermanos Rodríguez, located in the Magdalena Mixhuca recreational sports park in the middle of Mexico City. The track had been slightly shortened and modified from its previous layout; although Mexico City was located on a geologically active surface; so the circuit was very bumpy- and the most fearsome and spectacular corner on the circuit, the banked 275 km/h, 180-degree Peraltada turn remained from before, but with more run-off area and less banking than before.

It was the first win for Gerhard Berger and the first win for the Benetton team. Benetton ran on Pirelli tyres, and their relative durability compared to competitors on Goodyear tyres played to the team's advantage. Berger won this race due to not having to make a pit stop for a fresh set of tyres. It would also prove to be the final win for the turbocharged BMW engine.

Starting from third on the grid, Nigel Mansell could have wrapped up his first World Drivers' Championship with a win. However, it all went wrong on the grid when he went to select first gear for the start, and was still fumbling trying to get it in when the lights went green. By the time he got his Williams-Honda into gear more than two thirds of the field had gone past and he finished the first lap in 18th place. He would ultimately finish in 5th place meaning that the following Australian Grand Prix in Adelaide would see a three-way shootout for the championship between Mansell, defending champion Prost looking to be the first driver to win back-to-back championships since Jack Brabham in 1959–1960, and Mansell's own Williams teammate Nelson Piquet looking to win his 3rd championship after winning the 1981 and 1983 titles.

== Classification ==
=== Qualifying ===
| Pos | No | Driver | Constructor | Q1 | Q2 | Gap |
|---|---|---|---|---|---|---|
| 1 | 12 | (Brazil) Ayrton Senna | Lotus-Renault | 1:18.367 | 1:16.990 | — |
| 2 | 6 | (Brazil) Nelson Piquet | Williams-Honda | 1:18.037 | 1:17.279 | +0.289 |
| 3 | 5 | (United Kingdom) Nigel Mansell | Williams-Honda | 1:18.269 | 1:17.514 | +0.524 |
| 4 | 20 | (Austria) Gerhard Berger | Benetton-BMW | 1:17.780 | 1:17.609 | +0.619 |
| 5 | 7 | (Italy) Riccardo Patrese | Brabham-BMW | 1:21.241 | 1:18.285 | +1.295 |
| 6 | 1 | (France) Alain Prost | McLaren-TAG | 1:19.294 | 1:18.421 | +1.431 |
| 7 | 8 | (United Kingdom) Derek Warwick | Brabham-BMW | 1:19.713 | 1:18.527 | +1.537 |
| 8 | 16 | (France) Patrick Tambay | Lola-Ford | 1:20.492 | 1:18.839 | +1.849 |
| 9 | 19 | (Italy) Teo Fabi | Benetton-BMW | 1:18.971 | 1:18.893 | +1.903 |
| 10 | 26 | (France) Philippe Alliot | Ligier-Renault | 1:20.372 | 1:19.257 | +2.267 |
| 11 | 2 | (Finland) Keke Rosberg | McLaren-TAG | | 1:19.342 | +2.352 |
| 12 | 27 | (Italy) Michele Alboreto | Ferrari | 1:19.628 | 1:19.388 | +2.398 |
| 13 | 25 | (France) René Arnoux | Ligier-Renault | 1:19.624 | 1:20.458 | +2.634 |
| 14 | 28 | (Sweden) Stefan Johansson | Ferrari | 1:20.303 | 1:19.769 | +2.779 |
| 15 | 15 | (Australia) Alan Jones | Lola-Ford | 1:20.525 | 1:20.090 | +3.100 |
| 16 | 3 | (United Kingdom) Martin Brundle | Tyrrell-Renault | 1:21.587 | 1:20.198 | +3.208 |
| 17 | 11 | (United Kingdom) Johnny Dumfries | Lotus-Renault | 1:20.479 | 1:21.491 | +3.489 |
| 18 | 14 | (United Kingdom) Jonathan Palmer | Zakspeed | 1:21.154 | 1:20.668 | +3.678 |
| 19 | 4 | (France) Philippe Streiff | Tyrrell-Renault | 1:20.946 | 1:21.174 | +3.956 |
| 20 | 17 | (West Germany) Christian Danner | Arrows-BMW | 1:21.069 | 1:21.461 | +4.079 |
| 21 | 18 | (Belgium) Thierry Boutsen | Arrows-BMW | 1:21.171 | 1:21.361 | +4.181 |
| 22 | 23 | (Italy) Andrea de Cesaris | Minardi-Motori Moderni | 1:22.470 | 1:22.521 | +5.480 |
| 23 | 29 | (Netherlands) Huub Rothengatter | Zakspeed | 1:23.812 | 1:22.524 | +5.534 |
| 24 | 24 | (Italy) Alessandro Nannini | Minardi-Motori Moderni | 1:25.179 | 1:23.457 | +6.467 |
| 25 | 21 | (Italy) Piercarlo Ghinzani | Osella-Alfa Romeo | 1:25.767 | 1:24.176 | +7.186 |
| 26 | 22 | (Canada) Allen Berg | Osella-Alfa Romeo | 1:26.573 | 1:27.209 | +9.583 |

=== Race ===
| Pos | No | Driver | Constructor | Laps | Time/Retired | Grid | Points |
|---|---|---|---|---|---|---|---|
| 1 | 20 | (Austria) Gerhard Berger | Benetton-BMW | 68 | 1:33:18.700 | 4 | 9 |
| 2 | 1 | (France) Alain Prost | McLaren-TAG | 68 | +25.438 | 6 | 6 |
| 3 | 12 | (Brazil) Ayrton Senna | Lotus-Renault | 68 | +52.513 | 1 | 4 |
| 4 | 6 | (Brazil) Nelson Piquet | Williams-Honda | 67 | +1 lap | 2 | 3 |
| 5 | 5 | (United Kingdom) Nigel Mansell | Williams-Honda | 67 | +1 lap | 3 | 2 |
| 6 | 26 | (France) Philippe Alliot | Ligier-Renault | 67 | +1 lap | 10 | 1 |
| 7 | 18 | (Belgium) Thierry Boutsen | Arrows-BMW | 66 | +2 laps | 21 | |
| 8 | 23 | (Italy) Andrea de Cesaris | Minardi-Motori Moderni | 66 | +2 laps | 22 | |
| 9 | 17 | (Germany) Christian Danner | Arrows-BMW | 66 | +2 laps | 20 | |
| 10 | 14 | (United Kingdom) Jonathan Palmer | Zakspeed | 65 | Out of fuel | 18 | |
| 11 | 3 | (United Kingdom) Martin Brundle | Tyrrell-Renault | 65 | +3 laps | 16 | |
| 12 | 28 | (Sweden) Stefan Johansson | Ferrari | 64 | Turbo | 14 | |
| 13 | 7 | (Italy) Riccardo Patrese | Brabham-BMW | 64 | Spun off | 5 | |
| 14 | 24 | (Italy) Alessandro Nannini | Minardi-Motori Moderni | 64 | +4 laps | 24 | |
| 15 | 25 | (France) René Arnoux | Ligier-Renault | 63 | Engine | 13 | |
| 16 | 22 | (Canada) Allen Berg | Osella-Alfa Romeo | 61 | +7 laps | 26 | |
| Ret | 11 | (United Kingdom) Johnny Dumfries | Lotus-Renault | 53 | Electrical | 17 | |
| Ret | 8 | (United Kingdom) Derek Warwick | Brabham-BMW | 37 | Engine | 7 | |
| Ret | 15 | (Australia) Alan Jones | Lola-Ford | 35 | Tyre | 15 | |
| Ret | 2 | (Finland) Keke Rosberg | McLaren-TAG | 32 | Puncture | 11 | |
| Ret | 27 | (Italy) Michele Alboreto | Ferrari | 10 | Turbo | 12 | |
| Ret | 21 | (Italy) Piercarlo Ghinzani | Osella-Alfa Romeo | 8 | Turbo | 25 | |
| Ret | 4 | (France) Philippe Streiff | Tyrrell-Renault | 8 | Turbo | 19 | |
| Ret | 19 | (Italy) Teo Fabi | Benetton-BMW | 4 | Engine | 9 | |
| Ret | 16 | (France) Patrick Tambay | Lola-Ford | 0 | Accident | 8 | |
| DNS | 29 | (Netherlands) Huub Rothengatter | Zakspeed | 0 | Accident | 23 | |

== Championship standings after the race ==
- **Bold text** indicates the World Champions.

Drivers' Championship standings

| Pos | Driver | Points |
|---|---|---|
| 1 | (United Kingdom) Nigel Mansell | 70 (72) |
| 2 | (France) Alain Prost | 64 (65) |
| 3 | (Brazil) Nelson Piquet | 63 |
| 4 | (Brazil) Ayrton Senna | 55 |
| 5 | (Finland) Keke Rosberg | 22 |

Constructors' Championship standings

| Pos | Constructor | Points |
|---|---|---|
| 1 | (United Kingdom) **Williams-Honda** | 135 |
| 2 | (United Kingdom) McLaren-TAG | 87 |
| 3 | (United Kingdom) Lotus-Renault | 57 |
| 4 | (Italy) Ferrari | 33 |
| 5 | (France) Ligier-Renault | 29 |

- Note: Only the top five positions are included for both sets of standings.

| Previous race: 1986 Portuguese Grand Prix | FIA Formula One World Championship; 1986 season | Next race: 1986 Australian Grand Prix |
| Previous race: 1970 Mexican Grand Prix | Mexican Grand Prix | Next race: 1987 Mexican Grand Prix |
Awards
| Preceded by 1985 Australian Grand Prix | Formula One Promotional Trophy for Race Promoter; 1986 | Succeeded by 1987 Japanese Grand Prix |
