= 1986 Portuguese Grand Prix =

- Race 14 of 16 in the 1986 Formula One World Championship
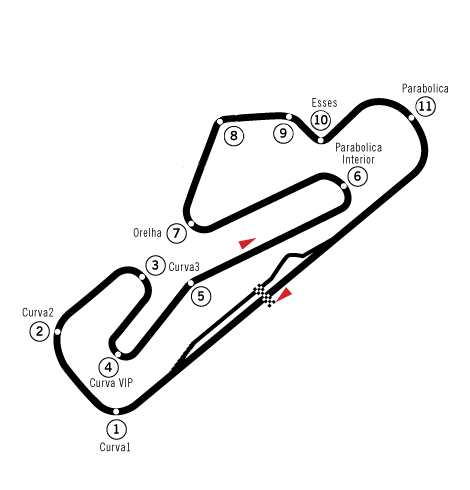

Race details
- Date: 21 September 1986
- Official name: 15º Grande Prémio de Portugal
- Location: Autódromo do Estoril; Estoril, Portugal
- Course: Permanent racing facility
- Course length: 4.35 km (2.703 miles)
- Distance: 70 laps, 304.5 km (189.208 miles)
- Weather: Dry

Pole position
Driver	(Brazil) Ayrton Senna	Lotus-Renault
- Time: 1:16.673

Fastest lap
Driver	(United Kingdom) Nigel Mansell	Williams-Honda
- Time: 1:20.943 on lap 53

Podium
First	(United Kingdom) Nigel Mansell	Williams-Honda
Second	(France) Alain Prost	McLaren-TAG
Third	(Brazil) Nelson Piquet	Williams-Honda

The 1986 Portuguese Grand Prix was a Formula One motor race held at Estoril on 21 September 1986. It was the fourteenth race of the 1986 FIA Formula One World Championship.

The 70-lap race was won by British driver Nigel Mansell, driving a Williams-Honda. Brazilian Ayrton Senna took pole position in his Lotus-Renault, but Mansell passed him at the start and led the entire race, also setting the fastest race lap. Senna held on to second place until he ran out of fuel on the final lap and dropped to fourth, promoting Frenchman Alain Prost in the McLaren-TAG to second and Mansell's Brazilian teammate Nelson Piquet to third.

The win, Mansell's fifth of the season, gave him a ten-point lead in the Drivers' Championship with two races remaining, with Piquet second and Prost a further point back in third. Senna's final-lap misfortune ended his challenge for the title. The win also secured the Constructors' Championship for Williams, their third in all.

Keke Rosberg, who retired on lap 41 due to electrical problems, raced his gold-and-white McLaren to promote the newly launched Marlboro Lights brand (marking the only race in which McLaren did so).

== Classification ==
=== Qualifying ===
Pos	No	Driver	Constructor	Q1	Q2	Gap
1	12	(Brazil) Ayrton Senna	Lotus-Renault	1:19.943	1:16.673	
2	5	(United Kingdom) Nigel Mansell	Williams-Honda	1:19.047	1:17.489	+0.816
3	1	(France) Alain Prost	McLaren-TAG	1:19.692	1:17.710	+1.037
4	20	(Austria) Gerhard Berger	Benetton-BMW	1:19.923	1:17.742	+1.069
5	19	(Italy) Teo Fabi	Benetton-BMW	1:20.957	1:18.071	+1.398
6	6	(Brazil) Nelson Piquet	Williams-Honda	1:19.410	1:18.180	+1.507
7	2	(Finland) Keke Rosberg	McLaren-TAG	1:20.556	1:18.360	+1.687
8	28	(Sweden) Stefan Johansson	Ferrari	1:21.621	1:19.332	+2.659
9	7	(Italy) Riccardo Patrese	Brabham-BMW	1:21.257	1:19.637	+2.964
10	25	(France) René Arnoux	Ligier-Renault	1:21.876	1:19.657	+2.984
11	26	(France) Philippe Alliot	Ligier-Renault	1:21.693	1:19.769	+3.096
12	8	(United Kingdom) Derek Warwick	Brabham-BMW	1:23.455	1:19.882	+3.209
13	27	(Italy) Michele Alboreto	Ferrari	1:21.123	1:20.019	+3.346
14	16	(France) Patrick Tambay	Lola-Ford	1:22.396	1:20.761	+4.088
15	11	(United Kingdom) Johnny Dumfries	Lotus-Renault	1:23.778	1:21.594	+4.921
16	23	(Italy) Andrea de Cesaris	Minardi-Motori Moderni	1:23.361	1:21.611	+4.938
17	15	(Australia) Alan Jones	Lola-Ford	1:22.612	1:21.646	+4.973
18	24	(Italy) Alessandro Nannini	Minardi-Motori Moderni	1:24.724	1:21.702	+5.029
19	3	(United Kingdom) Martin Brundle	Tyrrell-Renault	1:25.114	1:21.835	+5.162
20	14	(United Kingdom) Jonathan Palmer	Zakspeed	1:23.941	1:21.929	+5.256
21	18	(Belgium) Thierry Boutsen	Arrows-BMW	1:23.412	1:22.068	+5.395
22	17	(West Germany) Christian Danner	Arrows-BMW	1:24.665	1:22.274	+5.601
23	4	(France) Philippe Streiff	Tyrrell-Renault	1:23.895	1:22.388	+5.715
24	21	(Italy) Piercarlo Ghinzani	Osella-Alfa Romeo	1:26.552	1:23.566	+6.893
25	31	(Italy) Ivan Capelli	AGS-Motori Moderni	1:25.795	1:23.987	+7.314
26	29	(Netherlands) Huub Rothengatter	Zakspeed	1:25.928	1:24.105	+7.432
27	22	(Canada) Allen Berg	Osella-Alfa Romeo	1:29.724	1:26.861	+10.188

=== Race ===
Pos	No	Driver	Constructor	Laps	Time/Retired	Grid	Points
1	5	(United Kingdom) Nigel Mansell	Williams-Honda	70	1:37:21.900	2	9
2	1	(France) Alain Prost	McLaren-TAG	70	+ 18.772	3	6
3	6	(Brazil) Nelson Piquet	Williams-Honda	70	+ 49.274	6	4
4	12	(Brazil) Ayrton Senna	Lotus-Renault	69	Out of Fuel	1	3
5	27	(Italy) Michele Alboreto	Ferrari	69	+ 1 Lap	13	2
6	28	(Sweden) Stefan Johansson	Ferrari	69	+ 1 Lap	8	1
7	25	(France) René Arnoux	Ligier-Renault	69	+ 1 Lap	10	
8	19	(Italy) Teo Fabi	Benetton-BMW	68	+ 2 Laps	5	
9	11	(United Kingdom) Johnny Dumfries	Lotus-Renault	68	+ 2 Laps	15	
10	18	(Belgium) Thierry Boutsen	Arrows-BMW	67	+ 3 Laps	21	
11	17	(Germany) Christian Danner	Arrows-BMW	67	+ 3 Laps	22	
12	14	(United Kingdom) Jonathan Palmer	Zakspeed	67	+ 3 Laps	20	
13	22	(Canada) Allen Berg	Osella-Alfa Romeo	63	+ 7 Laps	27	
Ret	7	(Italy) Riccardo Patrese	Brabham-BMW	62	Engine	9	
NC	16	(France) Patrick Tambay	Lola-Ford	62	+ 8 Laps	14	
Ret	24	(Italy) Alessandro Nannini	Minardi-Motori Moderni	60	Gearbox	18	
Ret	20	(Austria) Gerhard Berger	Benetton-BMW	44	Spun Off	4	
Ret	23	(Italy) Andrea de Cesaris	Minardi-Motori Moderni	43	Spun Off	16	
Ret	2	(Finland) Keke Rosberg	McLaren-TAG	41	Electrical	7	
Ret	8	(United Kingdom) Derek Warwick	Brabham-BMW	41	Electrical	12	
Ret	26	(France) Philippe Alliot	Ligier-Renault	39	Engine	11	
Ret	4	(France) Philippe Streiff	Tyrrell-Renault	28	Engine	23	
Ret	3	(United Kingdom) Martin Brundle	Tyrrell-Renault	18	Engine	19	
Ret	15	(Australia) Alan Jones	Lola-Ford	10	Brakes/Spin	17	
Ret	29	(Netherlands) Huub Rothengatter	Zakspeed	9	Transmission	26	
Ret	21	(Italy) Piercarlo Ghinzani	Osella-Alfa Romeo	8	Engine	24	
Ret	31	(Italy) Ivan Capelli	AGS-Motori Moderni	6	Transmission	25	

== Championship standings after the race ==
- **Bold text** indicates the World Champions.

Drivers' Championship standings

Pos	Driver	Points
1	(United Kingdom) Nigel Mansell	70
2	(Brazil) Nelson Piquet	60
3	(France) Alain Prost	59
4	(Brazil) Ayrton Senna	51
5	(Finland) Keke Rosberg	22

Constructors' Championship standings

Pos	Constructor	Points
1	(United Kingdom) **Williams-Honda**	130
2	(United Kingdom) McLaren-TAG	81
3	(United Kingdom) Lotus-Renault	53
4	(Italy) Ferrari	33
5	(France) Ligier-Renault	28

- Note: Only the top five positions are included for both sets of standings.

Previous race: 1986 Italian Grand Prix	FIA Formula One World Championship; 1986 season	Next race: 1986 Mexican Grand Prix
Previous race: 1985 Portuguese Grand Prix	Portuguese Grand Prix	Next race: 1987 Portuguese Grand Prix
