= Arrows A9 =

Formula One racing car

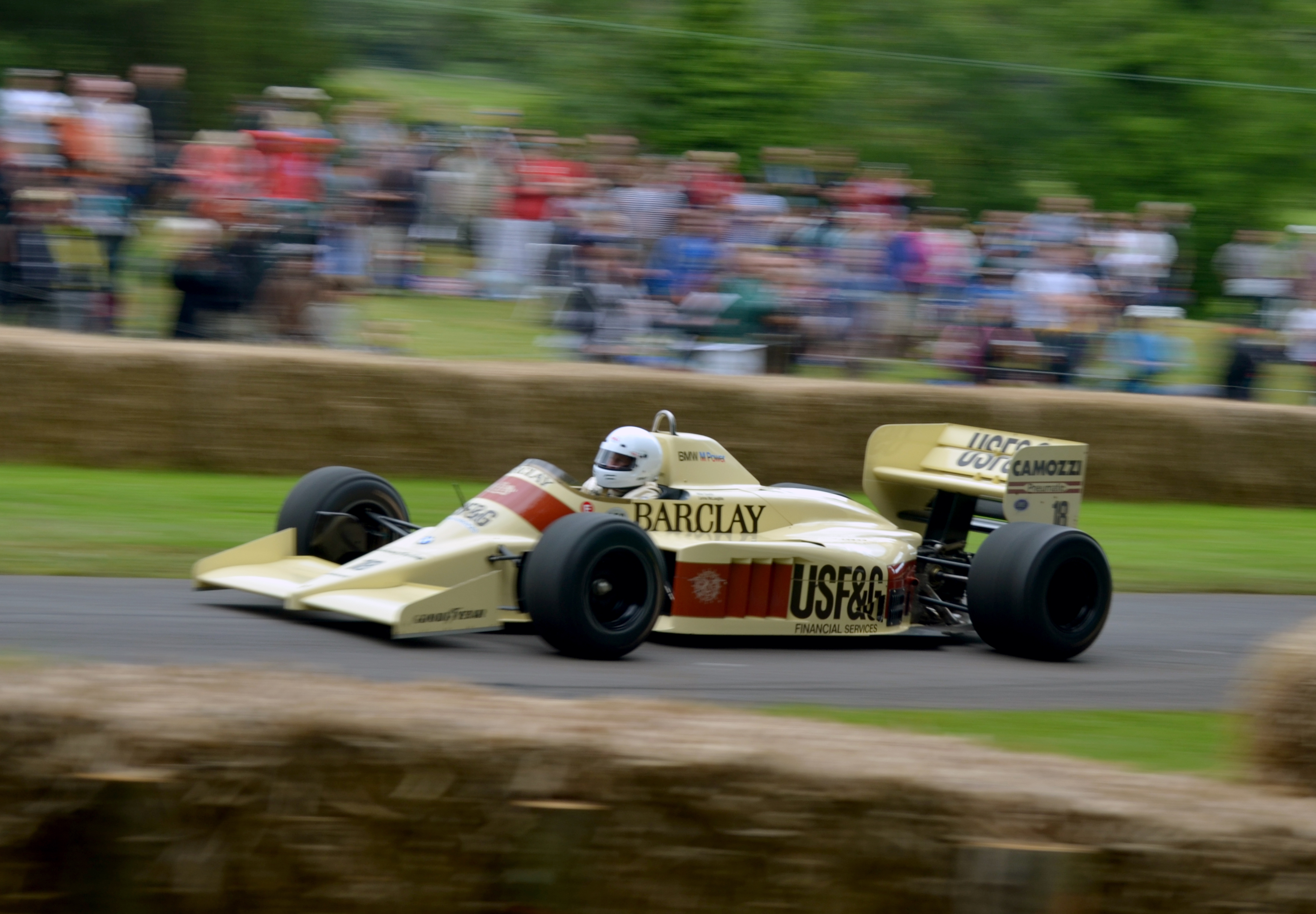
- The A9 at the 2012 Goodwood Festival of Speed
- Category: Formula One
- Constructor: Arrows
- Designer: Dave Wass
- Predecessor: A8
- Successor: A10

Technical specifications
- Chassis: Carbon fibre monocoque
- Axle track: Front: 1,854 mm (73.0 in); Rear: 1,676 mm (66.0 in)
- Wheelbase: 2,921 mm (115.0 in)
- Engine: BMW M12/13, 1,500 cc (91.5 cu in), inline-four, turbocharged, mid-engine, longitudinally mounted
- Transmission: Arrows / Hewland 6-speed manual
- Weight: 540 kg (1,190 lb)
- Fuel: Castrol
- Tyres: Goodyear

Competition history
- Notable entrants: Barclay Arrows BMW
- Notable drivers: 17. (Germany) Christian Danner; 18. (Belgium) Thierry Boutsen
- Debut: 1986 German Grand Prix
- Last event: 1986 Austrian Grand Prix
Races	Wins	Poles	F/Laps
3	0	0	0
- Constructors' Championships: 0
- Drivers' Championships: 0

The Arrows A9 was a Formula One car which the Arrows team used to compete in the 1986 Formula One season. It was powered by the massively-powerful BMW M12/13 turbocharged inline-four engine. Unlike the BMWs used by the Brabham and Benetton teams whose engines were maintained and updated regularly by BMW, the Arrows engines were maintained by Swiss engine guru Heini Mader and were rated as the least powerful of the BMW runners.

The A9 was supposed to replace the ageing A8 car, but it turned out to be worse than its predecessor. The new car was the team's first carbon composite chassis, built by British Aerospace but delays in manufacture caused the car to be late. Its lack of performance caused Dave Wass to quit Arrows.

Because of this, the team stuck with the A8 from the previous season. As a result, the A9 only saw action at three races, at the German and Austrian Grands Prix, in the hands of Thierry Boutsen, in both of these races the car failed to finish after its turbocharger failed.

At the Hungarian Grand Prix teammate Christian Danner raced the A9 but retired after 7 laps with rear suspension failure.

The Arrows team found that the rear end was the major problem with the A9 and for a couple of races it was run with its new front end joined to the rear end of the A8. While this actually improved the performance of the new car, Arrows soon returned to running the older A8 for the balance of the season.

Arrows finished the season in 10th place, with a single point, earned by Boutsen's teammate Christian Danner in Austria while driving the A8.

== Complete Formula One results ==
(key)

Year	Entrant	Engine	Tyres	Drivers	1	2	3	4	5	6	7	8	9	10	11	12	13	14	15	16	Points	WCC
1986	Barclay Arrows BMW	BMW M12 S4 (t/c)	G		BRA	ESP	SMR	MON	BEL	CAN	DET	FRA	GBR	GER	HUN	AUT	ITA	POR	MEX	AUS	1*	10th
1986	Barclay Arrows BMW	BMW M12 S4 (t/c)	G	Thierry Boutsen										Ret		Ret					1*	10th
1986	Barclay Arrows BMW	BMW M12 S4 (t/c)	G	Christian Danner											Ret						1*	10th

* scored with the Arrows A8
