= Gerhard Berger =

Austrian racing driver (born 1959)

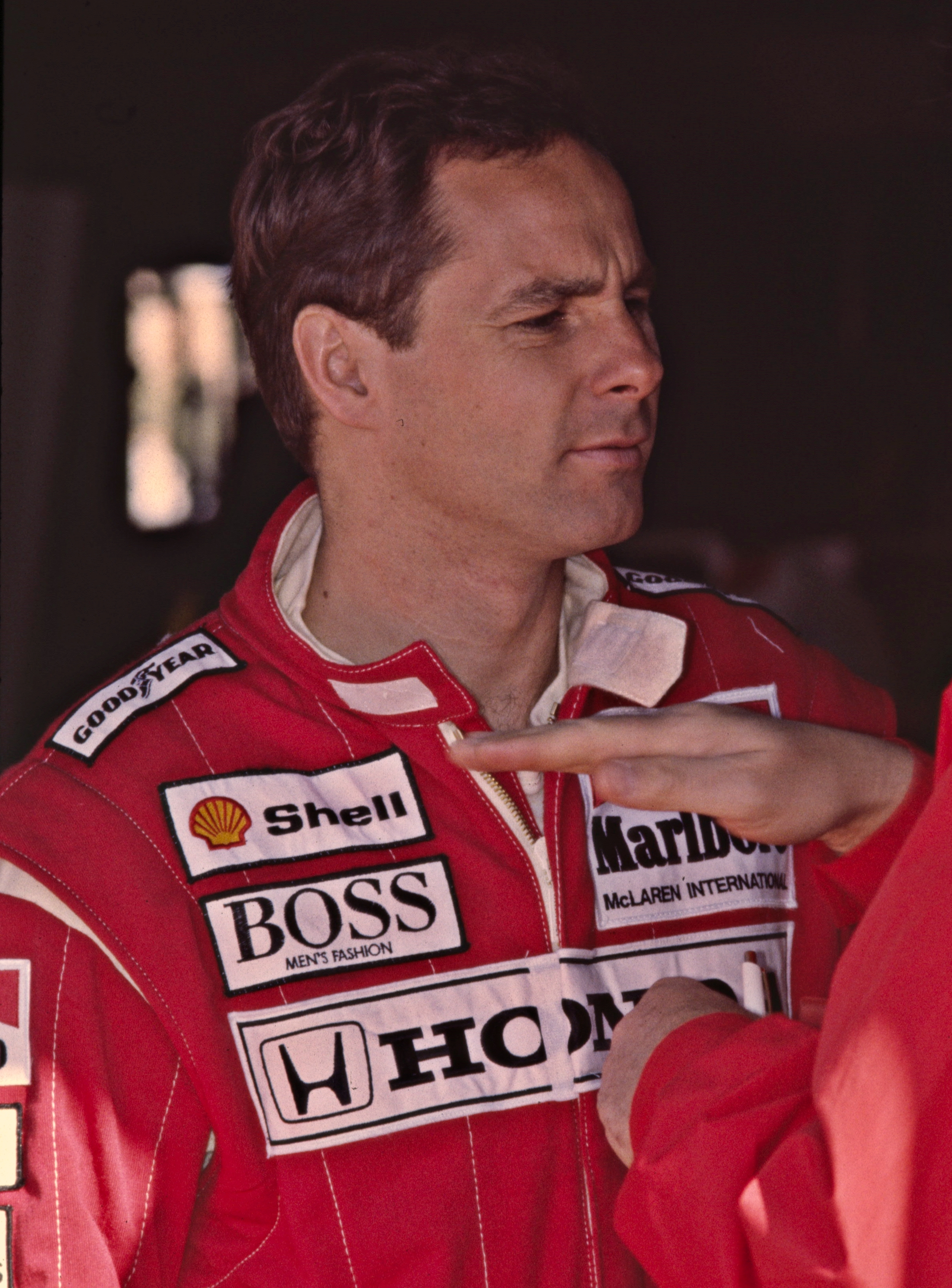
- Berger at the 1991 United States Grand Prix
- Born: 27 August 1959 (age 67); Wörgl, Tyrol, Austria
- Spouse: Ana Corvo (m. 1995; div. 2013)
- Children: 5
- Relatives: Lucas Auer (nephew)

Formula One World Championship career
- Nationality: (Austria) Austrian
- Active years: 1984–1997
- Team(s): ATS, Arrows, Benetton, Ferrari, McLaren
- Entries: 210
- Championships: 0
- Wins: 10
- Podiums: 48
- Career points: 385
- Pole positions: 12
- Fastest laps: 21
- First entry: 1984 Austrian Grand Prix
- First win: 1986 Mexican Grand Prix
- Last win: 1997 German Grand Prix
- Last entry: 1997 European Grand Prix

Gerhard Berger (German pronunciation: [ˈɡeːɐ̯.haʁt ˈbɛʁ.ɡɐ]; born 27 August 1959) is an Austrian former racing driver and motorsport executive, who competed in Formula One from 1984 to 1997. Berger won ten Formula One Grands Prix across 14 seasons.

Berger competed in Formula One for 14 seasons, twice finishing third overall in the championship in 1988 and 1994 with Ferrari. With 210 starts, Berger is amongst the most experienced Formula One drivers of all time. His first and last victories were also the first and last victories for the Benetton team, with eleven years separating them. He was also a race winner with Ferrari and with McLaren. When at McLaren, Berger drove alongside Ayrton Senna, contributing to the team's 1990 and 1991 constructors' titles. Berger retired in 1997 with ten wins, 12 pole positions, 21 fastest laps and 48 podiums in Formula One.

Berger returned to Formula One in 2006 as the co-owner of Toro Rosso, before selling his 50% share back to Red Bull at the end of the 2008 season.

== Career ==
=== Early years ===
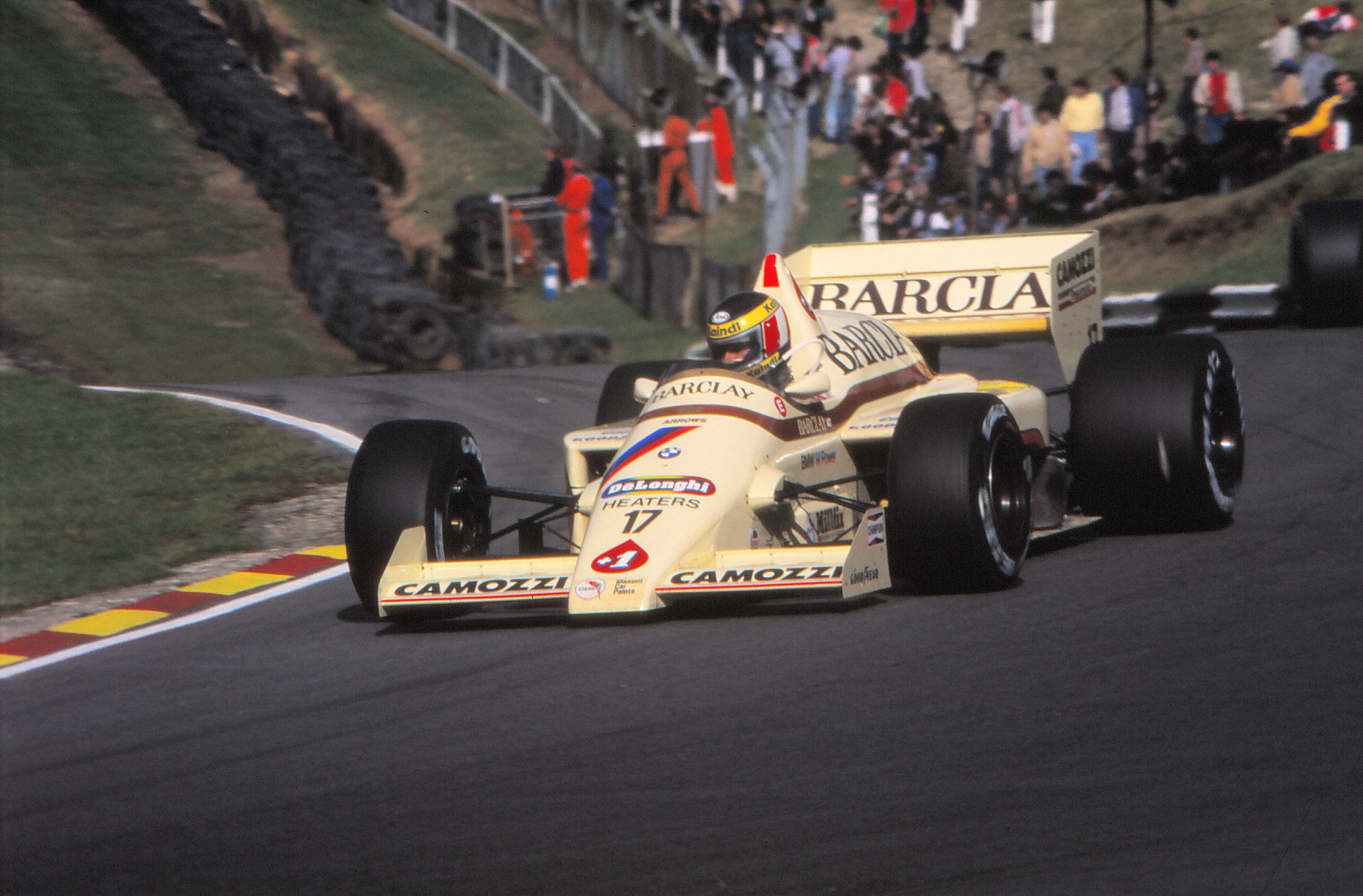
Berger during practice for the 1985 European Grand Prix

Gerhard Berger was born in Wörgl, Austria. His father Johann owned a truck company, which Gerhard worked at, later being promoted to driver. Berger, a multiple race winner in European Formula Three, moved up to Formula One in 1984 driving for the ATS team.

Shortly after entering Formula One, Berger was fortunate to have survived a serious road accident. A week after the 1984 season ended, he was driving home in his BMW 323i through the hills above Salzburg. Suddenly his car was rammed from behind, resulting in it cartwheeling off a cliff. Berger was at that time not wearing a seatbelt, and was thrown clear of the BMW through the rear window. By chance, the first car on the crash scene was occupied by two surgeons specialising in back injuries. The doctors realised the extent of his injuries (a broken neck and some damaged bones in his back) and made sure he was not moved until special equipment arrived. Following emergency surgery, and a stay in hospital in Innsbruck, he made a full recovery.

A full season for Arrows followed in 1985, though both Berger and teammate Thierry Boutsen were hampered by the Arrows A8 which was not the best chassis on the grid and did not allow either to exploit the immense power of the BMW M12 engine. Although he had some good drives (including running sixth in France), Berger would finish the season in 20th place having scored 3 points in the last two races of the year in South Africa and Australia.

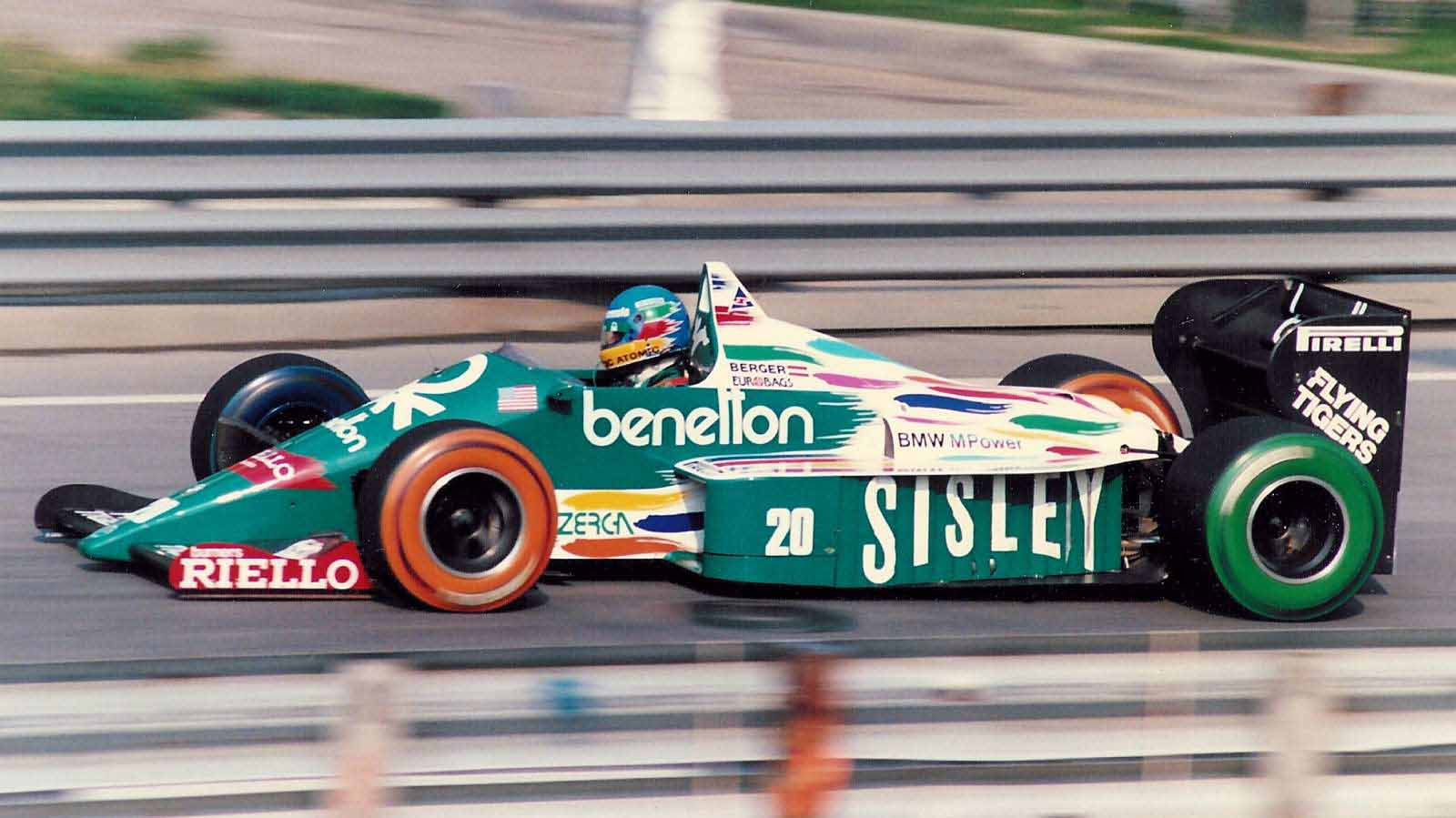
Berger driving for Benetton at the 1986 Detroit Grand Prix

It was not until joining Benetton in 1986 that his F1 career took off. Finally in a car that allowed him to exploit both his talent and the exceptional power of the BMW turbo engine (1,400 bhp (1,044 kW; 1,419 PS) in qualifying in 1986), coupled with a clever Pirelli tyre strategy, Berger won his first Grand Prix in Mexico using the Benetton B186. Berger was also on course for an easy victory at his home race, the 1986 Austrian Grand Prix before being forced into the pits from a comfortable lead with a flat battery. Berger out-qualified teammate Teo Fabi 12–4 in 1986 though Fabi, who as a Rookie had qualified on the pole for the 1983 Indianapolis 500, took pole at the faster Österreichring and Monza circuits. Berger established himself as a very fast driver in Formula One that year, recording the fastest speed trap of the season, clocking an incredible 351.22 km/h (218.23 mph) at the Italian Grand Prix at Monza. This remains the fastest straight line speed attained by a turbocharged car in the first turbo era.

Berger was also successful in Group A touring cars during this time, racing for the German Schnitzer BMW team, driving the BMW 635 Csi in the European Touring Car Championship. He won the 1985 Spa 24 Hours partnering Italian touring car ace Roberto Ravaglia and fellow Formula One driver, Marc Surer of Switzerland.

Until the mid-1980s when teams began stopping their drivers competing in other categories of racing (primarily due to the risk involved), it was not uncommon for a Grand Prix driver to race in sports and touring cars. However, by 1985 Formula One drivers were not permitted race in any other category within 24 hours of the start of a Grand Prix. At the season ending 1985 Australian Grand Prix in Adelaide, Berger had to obtain permission from the FIA, FOCA, and from Arrows team to race in a Group A touring car race which was a support category for the weekend. He needed the permission as the Grand Prix was scheduled to start at 2 pm on Sunday, 3 November and the Group A race was to start at 3 pm on the Saturday. Driving an ex-Schnitzer BMW 635 CSi (that had finished second behind his own at the Spa 24 Hours) for Australian racing legend and millionaire Bob Jane, Berger qualified second on the grid but his race lasted just three laps before he was punted into the gravel trap at the end of the pit straight by the Holden Commodore V8 of local veteran John Harvey.

=== Ferrari ===
For the 1987 season, Berger signed for Ferrari, partnering the Italian Michele Alboreto and replacing Stefan Johansson. After mechanical failures robbed him of the chance to perform, Berger came on strongly in the latter half of 1987, winning the final two rounds of the season. The 1987 Ferrari F1/87 benefitted from the work of ex-McLaren designer John Barnard although the car was designed by Austrian Gustav Brunner. Ferrari were back competing for race honours for the first time since mid-1985 from the Hungarian Grand Prix onwards. Berger was running a close second to Nigel Mansell at the Hungaroring before he was forced to retire. At Estoril for the Portuguese Grand Prix, Berger dominated the race from pole position before spinning in the latter stages to finish second after pressure from Alain Prost. The Austrian then looked to be heading for a second consecutive victory at the Hermanos Rodriguez circuit for the Mexican Grand Prix as he once again dominated the race but mechanical problems forced him to retire when leading. Success at both Suzuka and Adelaide for the Japanese and the Australian Grands Prix, including pole positions in both events and the fastest lap in Adelaide, ensured Ferrari and Berger went into the winter season with boosted confidence and both team and driver were tipped as favourites for the 1988 Championship. As he had done to Fabi in 1986, Berger out-qualified teammate Alboreto 12–4 in 1987. Berger's wins also gave Ferrari its first back to back victories since the late Gilles Villeneuve won the Monaco and Spanish Grands Prix in 1981.

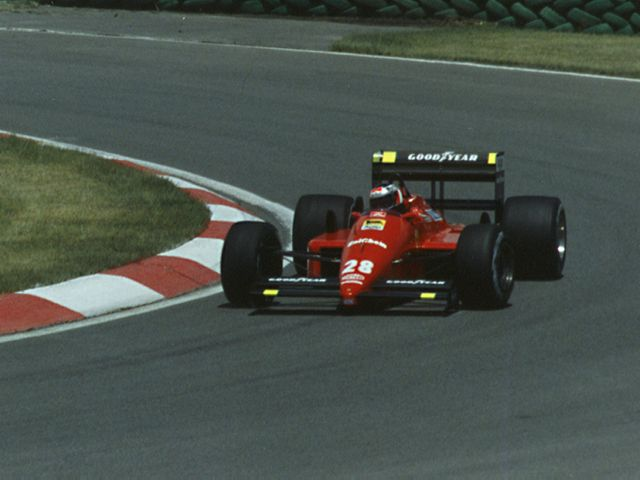
Berger driving for Ferrari at the 1988 Canadian Grand Prix

In 1988, the McLaren team, with twice World Champion Alain Prost and the sensationally fast Ayrton Senna dominated the season, winning 15 of the 16 rounds. The Honda V6 turbo engine in the McLaren MP4/4, and Lotus's 100T had superior fuel efficiency to the Ferrari, which caused both Berger and Alboreto to often drive much slower than possible in races. Berger was the only driver to break the McLaren stranglehold in 1988, winning the Italian Grand Prix after Senna tangled with Jean-Louis Schlesser, who had temporarily replaced Nigel Mansell (who was sick with chicken pox) in the Williams-Judd. Alboreto made it a Ferrari 1–2, finishing only half a second behind the Austrian. This was a particularly poignant victory for the team, as it came just weeks after the death of Enzo Ferrari. Berger was also the only non-McLaren to take pole in 1988 when he sat on pole for the British Grand Prix at Silverstone. It was also the only race where both Ferrari cars were on the front row, with Alboreto qualifying only 0.199 behind his teammate.

The Ferrari F1/87/88C proved troublesome for both Berger and teammate Alboreto especially in terms of fuel consumption from the 1.5 litre turbo engine (Ferrari, unlike the Japanese, had not built a new engine for the season to cope with the lower fuel limit of 150 litres and the lower 2.5 Bar turbo limit, instead fronting with an updated version of their 1987 engine). At the very wet British Grand Prix for instance, Berger led the opening laps from Senna having already attained pole position, consequently building a large cushion over the rest of the field before having to slow just to finish (at the halfway mark he was in second place, 50 seconds in front of 3rd placed Nigel Mansell). Ultimately he finished in ninth position, having fallen from fifth after running out of fuel coming out of the Woodcote chicane on the last lap, with Alboreto already having run out of fuel 3 laps from the finish. In the space of 200 metres, Berger was passed by Nelson Piquet (Lotus), Derek Warwick and Eddie Cheever (Arrows) and Riccardo Patrese (Williams). Both Ferrari drivers were often forced to use the lowest turbo boost setting they had (approximately 2.0 bar) and reduce their engine's revs in order to get the cars to the finish of a race. Until changes were made to the Ferrari's V6 engine late in the season, this meant that Berger and Alboreto were often vulnerable to attack from the leading atmospheric cars, with Berger estimating that he could often only use 550 bhp (410 kW; 558 PS) of the car's available 650 bhp (485 kW; 659 PS) during a race if he wanted to finish.

Berger was leading the final race of the season at Adelaide ahead of Prost and Senna before he clashed with former Ferrari driver René Arnoux in the Ligier while trying to lap the Frenchman. Before the race Berger, apparently with the full support of the team, told the McLaren drivers who qualified 1–2 in front of him that he was going to go all out and run as fast as he could without worrying about running out of fuel to give a good show for the fans. He did just that and after passing Senna for second on lap 3, he set numerous fastest laps before finally catching and passing Prost on lap 14. From there, he put some five seconds between himself and Prost before being taken out by Arnoux on lap 28. Berger out-qualified Alboreto in all 16 events for the 1988 Formula One calendar and in the eight races where they were both classified as finishers, finished behind Alboreto only once in France, spelling the end for the Italian after five seasons with the Maranello outfit.

For 1989, Berger was joined at Ferrari by Nigel Mansell. The Ferrari 640 with its V12 engine was fast but fragile, thanks in part to its revolutionary semi-automatic gearbox designed by John Barnard. At the Brazilian Grand Prix, Berger tangled with Senna at the first corner as the Brazilian found himself trapped between Riccardo Patrese's Williams-Renault to the left and Berger's Ferrari to the right, with the three drivers dicing for the lead. Berger was lucky to escape alive from a crash during the San Marino Grand Prix at Imola's Tamburello corner, where he went straight on into the wall at almost 180 mph (290 km/h). The car spun multiple times along the wall before catching fire. It took 16 seconds for a rescue crew to reach the Ferrari and put the fire out. Suffering remarkably few injuries, notably burns to his hands and some broken ribs, Berger was able to make it back to the cockpit at the Mexican Grand Prix after missing just the Monaco Grand Prix. Berger attributed this to Ferrari's unique semi-automatic paddle-shift gearbox, saying that his return would have been delayed if Ferrari still used the traditional gear stick transmission used in all other F1 cars in 1989.

With the exception of the Australian Grand Prix where both Ferrari drivers had poor qualifying sessions, Berger featured in the top four in qualifying and races in all of the remaining Grands Prix but poor reliability and accidents meant that he only finished three races all year (by mid-season the problem with the semi-automatic transmission was found to be not enough power from the battery which was fixed with the help of team sponsor, electrical experts Magneti Marelli). His first points of the year didn't come until he finished in second place in Round 12 at the Italian Grand Prix. He won the next race in Portugal which was overshadowed by the accident involving Mansell and Senna, and then finished second at the next race in Spain. These races were in fact his only points scored for the year but was still enough to give him 7th in the championship after being third in 1988. The improvement in form from Ferrari came too late though. At the British Grand Prix it was announced that Alain Prost would leave McLaren at the end of the season to join the Scuderia while Berger decided to sign for McLaren who, with their Honda V10 engines, was at the time the best and fastest team in Grand Prix racing.

=== McLaren ===
From 1990 to 1992, Berger joined Ayrton Senna at McLaren. His arrival was met with great anticipation as he had proven great form for Benetton and Ferrari. A McLaren-Honda seemed to offer Berger a genuine chance at the world championship for the first time. However, although generally quicker than his predecessor Alain Prost in relation to Senna in qualifying (he often qualified 2nd behind Senna), he was rarely able to match the Brazilian's pace during races. He took three wins in these three seasons, gifted the 1991 Japanese Grand Prix by Senna; as well as victories in Canada and Australia in 1992. During his three years at McLaren, Berger also obtained four pole positions and out-qualified Senna eight times.

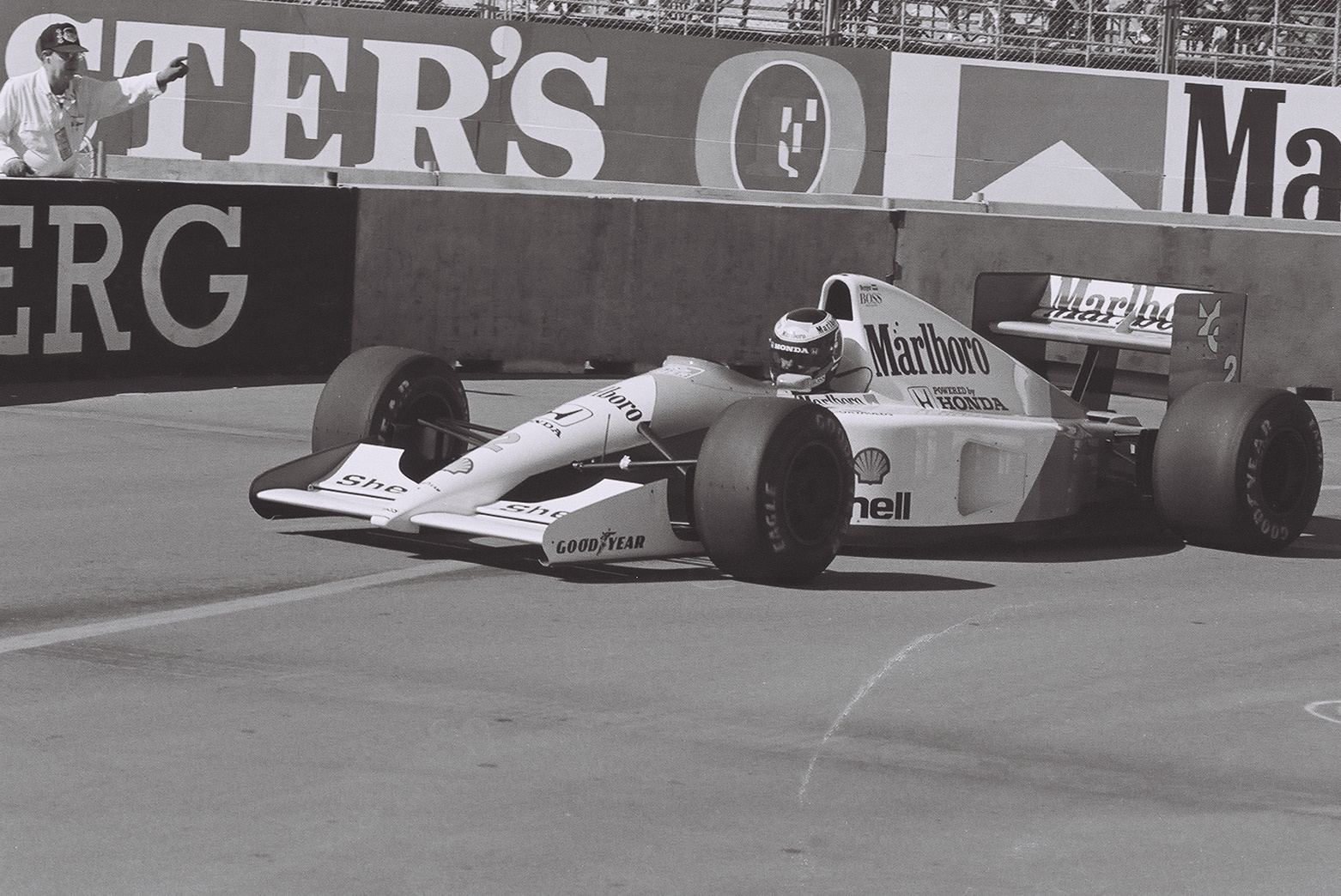
Berger driving for McLaren at the 1991 United States Grand Prix

Berger's debut at McLaren ruffled feathers, as he outqualified Senna for the 1990 United States Grand Prix obtaining pole position. Initially, Berger complained of a lack of space in the McLaren MP4/5B for the 1990 season, which had been designed in 1988/89 for the shorter Senna and Prost. At the 1990 Canadian Grand Prix, Berger finished first, around 45 seconds ahead of the eventual winner Senna, but was penalized by one minute for creeping at the start before the green lights. Berger also started from pole position at the 1990 Mexican Grand Prix. In 1990, Berger failed to win a race for his new team, while teammate Senna won the Drivers' Championship for the second time.

Towards the end of 1991, Berger found his form in the McLaren MP4/6 – a car he was able to fit in better than the MP4/5B, out-qualifying teammate Senna at the Portuguese, Spanish and the title deciding Japanese Grands Prix (claiming pole position in the latter two events).

In 1992, Berger won the 1992 Canadian Grand Prix having overtaken Riccardo Patrese's Williams and attacking teammate Senna before the Brazilian retired. During the 1992 Portuguese Grand Prix, Berger was involved in an incident with the Williams of Patrese. Patrese did not realize that Berger was heading towards the pitlane touched the McLaren's rear wheel and went airborne, narrowly missing a bridge, before coming to a halt in front of the armco of the pitlane. Berger then went on to win the Australian Grand Prix for the second time after a battle with Patrese. Berger therefore won his last race for McLaren and McLaren's last race with Honda engines. A lucrative offer from Ferrari proved too tempting for Berger who announced before the 1992 Belgian Grand Prix that he would be returning to the struggling Italian outfit.

According to former McLaren mechanic (Senna's chief mechanic in 1988) and the head of McLaren's gearbox shop from 1990-2006 Neil Trundle, Berger's nickname with the McLaren mechanics was "Gearhard" due to the number of gearboxes he broke in comparison to Senna.

=== Return to Ferrari ===
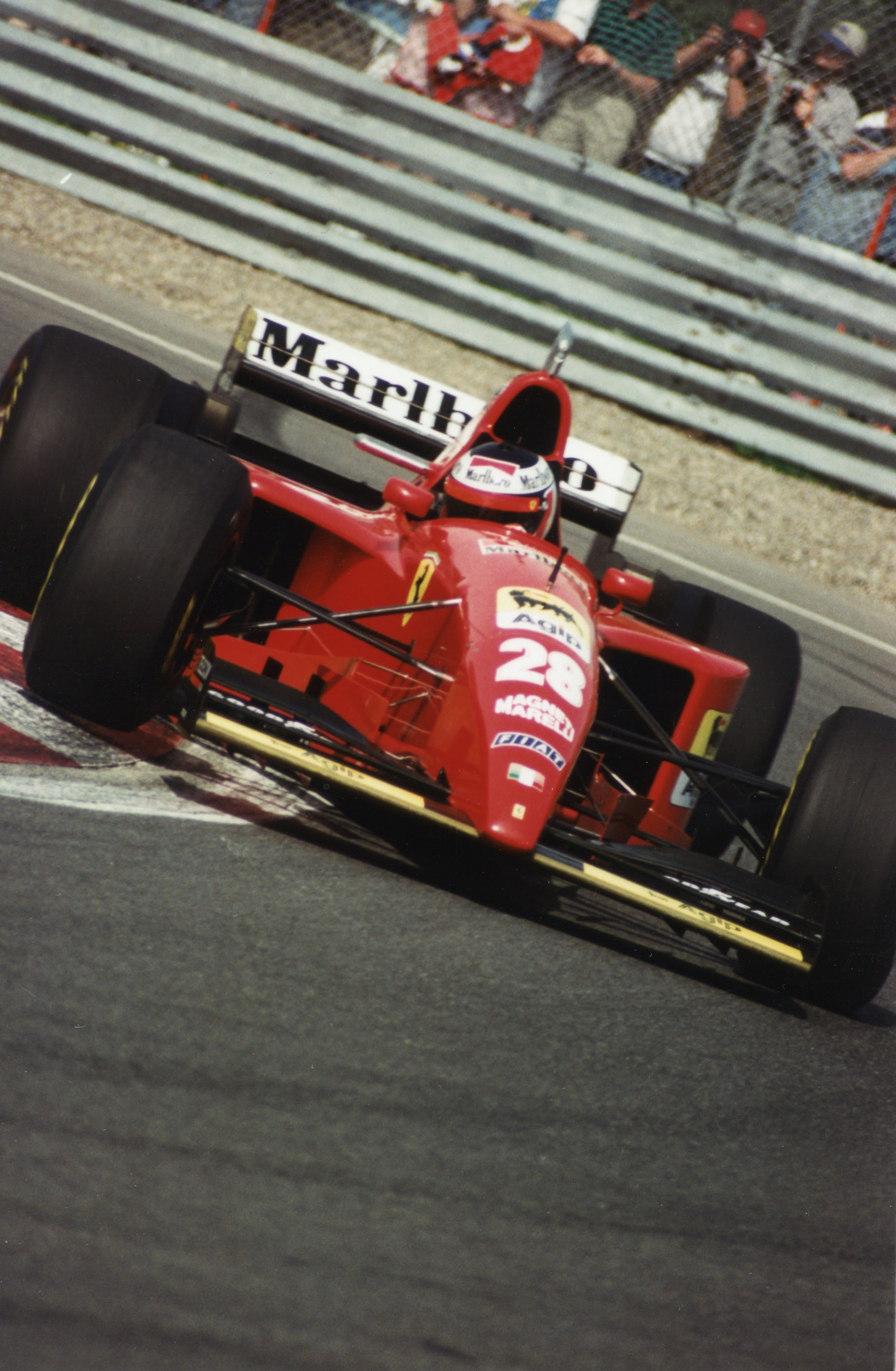
Berger driving a Ferrari at Montreal in 1995

Berger was persuaded by Ayrton Senna (who told him that Honda would leave Formula One at the end of the 1992 season, leaving McLaren without a works engine for the 1993 season) and also by his countryman Niki Lauda to return to the Italian team in 1993 as Lauda felt Berger brought valuable experience with him from his partnership with Senna. The active ride suspension made the car unpredictable to drive and the Ferrari F93A failed to record a single victory and spent the majority of the season competing for the lower points. Berger's best result was third position at the 1993 Hungarian Grand Prix. Berger had a number of spectacular incidents during the season including a clash with Michael Andretti at the start of the 1993 Brazilian Grand Prix and a dramatic impact with the armco at the 1993 Portuguese Grand Prix having just exited the pits. The 1993 Monaco Grand Prix was perhaps where Berger displayed his fighting qualities best of all, obtaining second fastest lap before he attempted an opportunistic move on Damon Hill's Williams at Loews hairpin while challenging for second position. The Austrian was forced to retire.

In 1994, Berger recovered from the deaths of close friend Senna and countryman Roland Ratzenberger at the 1994 San Marino Grand Prix, to score an emotional win at Hockenheim for the 1994 German Grand Prix in the Ferrari 412T, the first win for Ferrari since the 1990 Spanish Grand Prix. Berger also scored two pole positions in 1994, the first at Hockenheim and then at Estoril for the 1994 Portuguese Grand Prix where he retired from while leading. Berger was also in the lead at the final round at the 1994 Australian Grand Prix when he made a mistake, letting his former teammate Nigel Mansell pass and win for Williams.

A final season with the team in 1995 saw Berger score a number of podiums and was in a race winning position at the 1995 San Marino Grand Prix having qualified second before stalling in the pits but the fastest lap was a mere consolation. A particularly audacious pass on Damon Hill in Canada was just one example of his strong racecraft. Berger produced another aggressive drive for third having received a ten-second stop-go penalty for a jump start and then climbing up through the field from 14th position at the 1995 German Grand Prix, making a number of overtakings on the way. At Monza, both Ferrari drivers were in contention for the win, when an on-board camera on Jean Alesi's Ferrari fell into the path of Berger and smashed the Austrian's front suspension after damaging Alesi's car. The departure of both Alesi and Berger from Ferrari to Benetton also spelt the end of the number 27 and 28 era for Ferrari that stretched back to 1981 with Gilles Villeneuve and Didier Pironi only interrupted by the signing of 1989 world champion Alain Prost for the 1990 season.

=== Final seasons with Benetton ===
With the arrival of Michael Schumacher at Ferrari in 1996, Berger moved back to Benetton, although the team lost the competitiveness of the previous years. He could have remained at Maranello, but felt that the new Ferrari V10 engine would take too much time to develop. Berger spent his final two years in the sport at the team he drove for in 1986 while also sporting a revised helmet design, with the Austrian flag being rotated horizontally. 1996 proved to be a disappointing season for the Austrian, the handling characteristics of the Benetton B196 not being to his taste. Berger nearly won the German Grand Prix for the second time in his career before his Renault V10 engine blew up, handing victory to Damon Hill in the Williams. Berger's main problem for the early part of 1996 was his driving position that prevented a smooth airflow into the airbox. Consequently, Berger was significantly slower down the straights than teammate Jean Alesi.

The Benetton B197 had a lacklustre opening to the 1997 season at Melbourne but the team and Berger bounced back at the 1997 Brazilian Grand Prix, with Berger finishing second having overtaken Mika Häkkinen and Michael Schumacher. Berger then scored Benetton's final Grand Prix victory at the age of 37, again at Hockenheim, coming back after a three race layoff following a sinusitis surgery and the death of his father in a light aircraft accident. As well as the victory, Berger also claimed pole position and fastest lap during the 1997 German Grand Prix. He announced his decision to leave Benetton at the end of the season during the same weekend. He eventually retired at the end of the season, his final race seeing him finish a very close fourth in Jerez only seconds behind the victor Mika Häkkinen. In his final season as a Formula One driver, Berger and Alesi out-qualified each other seven times each with the Austrian missing three races due to illness. Rumours of a Ferrari return for 1998 were false. Sauber offered Berger a drive for 1998 to partner Alesi, but the Austrian turned down the offer for a number of reasons, not least because of the new regulations for grooved tyres which the Austrian did not find inspiring.

== Off-track activities ==
=== Berger and Senna ===
During the years that Berger was at McLaren (1990–1992), he became most famous for his humorous side. Popular accounts tell of many ingenious practical jokes thought up by the Austrian to break through to his serious, focused and unyielding teammate Ayrton Senna. Senna accepted the challenge and as both were spurred on by team manager Ron Dennis, the practical joking escalated. Accounts tell of an incident at Monza where Senna had been showing off his new tailor-made briefcase while riding in a helicopter with Berger. Having been made of carbon fibre composite, Senna argued that it was virtually indestructible. Berger opened the door of the helicopter and threw the briefcase out, to Senna's disbelief. Berger asserted that he only sought to innocently test the hypothesis.

Berger later recounted further events before the 1990 Australian Grand Prix. "After dinner, we started to throw people in the swimming pool, all dressed. As I was good at defending myself, I escaped from the bath, but many people got wet. Senna ran away to avoid us from getting him, however, later, I went to his room and he awkwardly threw a glass of water at me. For a Tyrolean, that was nothing, but it did mean that the game was now on. With a hose, we improvised an extension to the fire extinguisher and we put it under his room door at three in the morning. We invited some people to watch and when we pushed the lever, Senna flew out of the window like a rocket. It looked like a bomb had exploded inside the room. The confusion woke many people up, who started to scream at Senna for making so much noise. He was terribly embarrassed."

In an Australian hotel room, Berger filled Senna's bed with frogs. An infuriated Senna confronted Berger, who replied, "Did you find the snake?" Senna retaliated by putting strong-smelling French cheese in the air conditioning unit of Berger's room.

On another occasion, Senna and Brazilian compatriot Maurício Gugelmin decided to fill Berger's shoes with shaving foam on a fast train ride to a dinner in Japan. The Austrian was forced to attend the dinner wearing a tuxedo with running shoes. A further incident followed in which Berger replaced Senna's passport photo with what Ron Dennis described as "an equivalent-sized piece of male genitalia" (although other media accounts refer to a black pair of breasts, while Berger contends he snipped a woman spreading her legs in a Playboy magazine he had taken). Senna's fame meant he rarely had his passport checked, but on a later trip to Argentina, Berger's prank resulted in officials holding the Brazilian for 24 hours. In response to this gag, Senna superglued all of Berger's credit cards together.

The strong connection between Senna and Berger has extended beyond the Brazilian's death in 1994. Berger later acted as an advisor to Bruno Senna, Ayrton's nephew, who made his Formula One debut with the HRT F1 Team in the 2010 World Championship, and subsequently switched to Williams.

=== Other pranks ===
Berger's pranks continued at his new team for 1993, Scuderia Ferrari. Specifically, at the Fiorano Circuit a day before the launch of that season's new F1 car, Berger and his then new teammate, Jean Alesi, decided to take a nearby roadcar for a spin. Unbeknownst to them, that roadcar was team director Jean Todt's new specially made Lancia Y10. Because of the view that Alesi was driving conservatively, Berger decided to apply the handbrake causing the Lancia to flip upon their return to the pits, skidding upside down centimeters away from their yet-to-be unveiled new F1 car. Alesi was sent to the hospital. Later when Todt enquired about his roadcar, Berger conceded the two had put some "slight curb marks on the roof".

== After retirement from racing ==
Berger was up until 2003 regularly seen in the pitlane in his new capacity as Competitions Director at BMW, overseeing their successful return to Formula One in 2000.

Berger was the first to drive a F1 car on the new Shanghai Grand Prix circuit when he demonstrated a 2003 Ferrari F2003-GA.

On 25 April 2004, ten years after Ayrton Senna's death, Berger drove the JPS Lotus Renault 97T, which Senna had used in the 1985 championship, for three laps at Imola before the start of the 2004 San Marino Grand Prix.

In February 2006, Berger acquired 50% of Scuderia Toro Rosso in a deal which saw Red Bull boss Dietrich Mateschitz purchase half of Berger Logistik, a road haulage company founded by Berger's father Johann in 1961. His Toro Rosso team won their first Grand Prix with Sebastian Vettel taking the win. He sold his share back to Mateschitz in November 2008.

In 2012, Berger was appointed President of the FIA Single Seat Commission. He left the role in December 2014.

In March 2017, Berger became chairman of ITR, the promoter of the Deutsche Tourenwagen Masters.

== Helmet ==
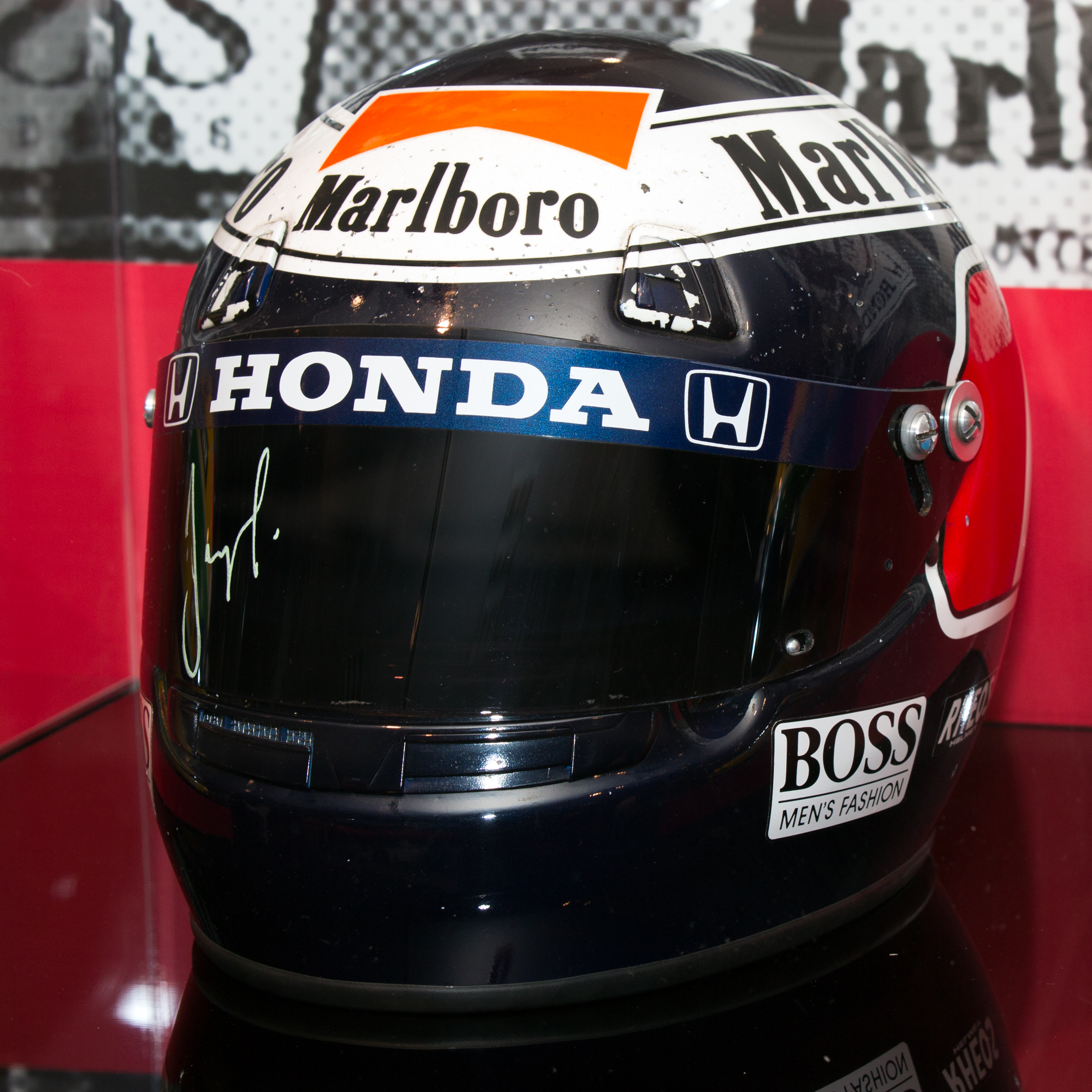
Berger's 1991 helmet

Berger's helmet originally was blue with yellow lines and azure and white details near the visor. In 1986, during his first spell at Benetton he used a different design that complimented the livery of the Benetton BMW. In 1987 his helmet was dark grey-blue, featuring the Austrian flag on either side. For the 1995 Portuguese Grand Prix, Berger sported a helmet featuring flags of multiple nations. The top was painted to resemble the Austrian flag and "NO WAR IN THE WORLD" at the rear. The special design was a result of a winning entrant for a one-off competition. In 1996, Berger modified his original design with the Austrian flag rotated horizontally.

== Racing record ==
=== Career summary ===
| Season | Series | Team | Races | Wins | Poles | F/Laps | Podiums | Points | Position |
|---|---|---|---|---|---|---|---|---|---|
| 1982 | German Formula Three | Josef Kaufmann Racing | 10 | 0 | 0 | 0 | 2 | 83 | **3rd** |
| 1982 | European Formula Three | Josef Kaufmann Racing | 3 | 0 | 0 | 0 | 0 | 0 | NC |
| 1983 | European Formula Three | MC Motorsport | 11 | 0 | 0 | 1 | 3 | 18 | 7th |
| 1983 | Macau Grand Prix | Trivellato Racing | 1 | 0 | 0 | 1 | 1 | N/A | **3rd** |
| 1984 | European Formula Three | Trivellato Racing | 11 | 2 | 1 | 1 | 7 | 49 | **3rd** |
| 1984 | Formula One | ATS Wheels | 4 | 0 | 0 | 0 | 0 | 0 | NC |
| 1984 | Interserie | URD Rennsport | 1 | 0 | 0 | 0 | 0 | 8 | 31st |
| 1984 | European Touring Car Championship | Schnitzer Motorsport | 5 | 0 | 0 | 0 | 0 | 0 | NC |
| 1985 | Formula One | Barclay Arrows BMW | 16 | 0 | 0 | 0 | 0 | 3 | 20th |
| 1985 | Deutsche Tourenwagen Meisterschaft | Schnitzer Motorsport | 1 | 0 | 0 | 0 | 0 | 11 | 30th |
| 1985 | European Touring Car Championship | Schnitzer Motorsport | 6 | 1 | 0 | 0 | 1 | 29 | NC |
| 1985 | World Sportscar Championship | Brun Motorsport | 1 | 0 | 0 | 0 | 0 | 6 | 56th |
| 1986 | Formula One | Benetton BMW Team | 16 | 1 | 0 | 2 | 2 | 17 | 7th |
| 1986 | European Touring Car Championship | Schnitzer Motorsport | 7 | 2 | 0 | 0 | 2 | 58 | NC |
| 1987 | Formula One | Ferrari | 16 | 2 | 3 | 3 | 3 | 36 | 5th |
| 1988 | Formula One | Ferrari | 16 | 1 | 1 | 3 | 5 | 41 | **3rd** |
| 1989 | Formula One | Ferrari | 15 | 1 | 0 | 1 | 3 | 21 | 7th |
| 1990 | Formula One | Honda Marlboro McLaren | 16 | 0 | 2 | 3 | 7 | 43 | 4th |
| 1991 | Formula One | Honda Marlboro McLaren | 16 | 1 | 2 | 2 | 6 | 43 | 4th |
| 1992 | Formula One | Honda Marlboro McLaren | 16 | 2 | 0 | 2 | 5 | 49 | 5th |
| 1993 | Formula One | Scuderia Ferrari | 16 | 0 | 0 | 0 | 1 | 12 | 8th |
| 1994 | Formula One | Scuderia Ferrari | 16 | 1 | 2 | 0 | 6 | 41 | **3rd** |
| 1995 | Formula One | Scuderia Ferrari | 17 | 0 | 1 | 2 | 6 | 31 | 6th |
| 1996 | Formula One | Mild Seven Benetton Renault | 16 | 0 | 0 | 1 | 2 | 21 | 6th |
| 1997 | Formula One | Mild Seven Benetton Renault | 14 | 1 | 1 | 2 | 2 | 27 | 5th |

=== Complete German Formula Three results ===
(key) (Races in bold indicate pole position) (Races in italics indicate fastest lap)

| Year | Team | Engine | 1 | 2 | 3 | 4 | 5 | 6 | 7 | 8 | 9 | 10 | DC | Pts |
|---|---|---|---|---|---|---|---|---|---|---|---|---|---|---|
| 1982 | Josef Kaufmann Racing | Alfa Romeo | NÜR; 16 | HOC; 6 | SAL; 4 | WUN; 3 | ERD; 5 | NÜR; Ret | DIE; 10 | ZOL; 3 | NÜR; 4 | KAS; 9 | 3rd | 83 |

=== Complete European Formula 3 results ===
(key) (Races in bold indicate pole position) (Races in italics indicate fastest lap)

| Year | Team | Engine | 1 | 2 | 3 | 4 | 5 | 6 | 7 | 8 | 9 | 10 | 11 | 12 | 13 | 14 | 15 | 16 | DC | Pts |
|---|---|---|---|---|---|---|---|---|---|---|---|---|---|---|---|---|---|---|---|---|
| 1982 | Josef Kaufmann Racing | Alfa Romeo | MUG | NÜR; 16 | DON | ZOL | MAG | ÖST; 12 | ZAN | SIL | MNZ; DNQ | PER | LAC | KNU | NOG | JAR | KAS; 9 | | NC | 0 |
| 1983 | MC Motorsport | Alfa Romeo | VLL | NÜR; C | ZOL; 3 | MAG; 6 | ÖST; 2 | LAC | SIL; 13 | MNZ; Ret | MIS; 7 | ZAN; 11 | KNU; 2 | NOG; Ret | JAR; Ret | IMO; 6 | DON | CET | 7th | 18 |
| 1984 | Trivellato Racing | Alfa Romeo | DON; 4 | ZOL; 4 | MAG; 7 | LAC; 3 | **ÖST**; 1 | SIL; 4 | NÜR; 3 | MNZ; 1 | PER; 3 | MUG; 2 | KNU | NOG; 3 | JAR | | | | 3rd | 49 |

=== Complete Macau Grand Prix results ===
| Year | Team | Chassis/Engine | Qualifying | Race1 | Race2 | Overall ranking | Ref |
|---|---|---|---|---|---|---|---|
| 1983 | (Italy) Trivellato Racing | Ralt・Alfa Romeo | 5th | 3 | 3 | **3rd** | |

=== Complete Formula One results ===
(key) (Races in bold indicate pole position; races in italics indicate fastest lap)

| Year | Entrant | Chassis | Engine | 1 | 2 | 3 | 4 | 5 | 6 | 7 | 8 | 9 | 10 | 11 | 12 | 13 | 14 | 15 | 16 | 17 | WDC | Pts |
|---|---|---|---|---|---|---|---|---|---|---|---|---|---|---|---|---|---|---|---|---|---|---|
| 1984 | Team ATS | ATS D7 | BMW M12/13 1.5 L4t | BRA | RSA | BEL | SMR | FRA | MON | CAN | DET | DAL | GBR | GER | AUT; 12 | NED | ITA; 6^{‡} | EUR; Ret | POR; 13 | | NC | 0 |
| 1985 | Barclay Arrows BMW | Arrows A8 | BMW M12/13 1.5 L4t | BRA; Ret | POR; Ret | SMR; Ret | MON; Ret | CAN; 13 | DET; 11 | FRA; Ret | GBR; 8 | GER; 7 | AUT; Ret | NED; 9 | ITA; Ret | BEL; 7 | EUR; 10 | RSA; 5 | AUS; 6 | | 20th | 3 |
| 1986 | Benetton BMW Team | Benetton B186 | BMW M12/13 1.5 L4t | BRA; 6 | ESP; 6 | SMR; 3 | MON; Ret | BEL; 10 | CAN; Ret | DET; Ret | FRA; Ret | GBR; Ret | GER; 10 | HUN; Ret | AUT; 7 | ITA; 5 | POR; Ret | MEX; 1 | AUS; Ret | | 7th | 17 |
| 1987 | Ferrari | Ferrari F1/87 | Ferrari 033D 1.5 V6t | BRA; 4 | SMR; Ret | BEL; Ret | MON; 4 | DET; 4 | FRA; Ret | GBR; Ret | GER; Ret | HUN; Ret | AUT; Ret | ITA; 4 | **POR**; 2 | ESP; Ret | MEX; Ret | **JPN**; 1 | **AUS**; 1 | | 5th | 36 |
| 1988 | Ferrari | Ferrari F1/87/88C | Ferrari 033E 1.5 V6t | BRA; 2 | SMR; 5 | MON; 2 | MEX; 3 | CAN; Ret | DET; Ret | FRA; 4 | **GBR**; 9 | GER; 3 | HUN; 4 | BEL; Ret | ITA; 1 | POR; Ret | ESP; 6 | JPN; 4 | AUS; Ret | | **3rd** | **41** |
| 1989 | Ferrari | Ferrari 640 | Ferrari 035/5 3.5 V12 | BRA; Ret | SMR; Ret | MON | MEX; Ret | USA; Ret | CAN; Ret | FRA; Ret | GBR; Ret | GER; Ret | HUN; Ret | BEL; Ret | ITA; 2 | POR; 1 | ESP; 2 | JPN; Ret | AUS; Ret | | 7th | 21 |
| 1990 | Honda Marlboro McLaren | McLaren MP4/5B | Honda RA109E 3.5 V10 | **USA**; Ret | BRA; 2 | SMR; 2 | MON; 3 | CAN; 4 | **MEX**; 3 | FRA; 5 | GBR; 14† | GER; 3 | HUN; 16† | BEL; 3 | ITA; 3 | POR; 4 | ESP; Ret | JPN; Ret | AUS; 4 | | 4th | 43 |
| 1991 | Honda Marlboro McLaren | McLaren MP4/6 | Honda RA121E 3.5 V12 | USA; Ret | BRA; 3 | SMR; 2 | MON; Ret | CAN; Ret | MEX; Ret | FRA; Ret | GBR; 2 | GER; 4 | HUN; 4 | BEL; 2 | ITA; 4 | POR; Ret | **ESP**; Ret | **JPN**; 1 | AUS; 3 | | 4th | 43 |
| 1992 | Honda Marlboro McLaren | McLaren MP4/6B | Honda RA122E 3.5 V12 | RSA; 5 | MEX; 4 | | | | | | | | | | | | | | | | 5th | 49 |
| 1992 | Honda Marlboro McLaren | McLaren MP4/7A | Honda RA122E/B 3.5 V12 | | | BRA; Ret | ESP; 4 | SMR; Ret | MON; Ret | CAN; 1 | FRA; Ret | GBR; 5 | GER; Ret | HUN; 3 | BEL; Ret | ITA; 4 | POR; 2 | JPN; 2 | AUS; 1 | | 5th | 49 |
| 1993 | Scuderia Ferrari | Ferrari F93A | Ferrari 041 3.5 V12 | RSA; 6 | BRA; Ret | EUR; Ret | SMR; Ret | ESP; 6 | MON; 14† | CAN; 4 | FRA; 14 | GBR; Ret | GER; 6 | HUN; 3 | BEL; 10† | ITA; Ret | POR; Ret | JPN; Ret | AUS; 5 | | 8th | 12 |
| 1994 | Scuderia Ferrari | Ferrari 412T1 | Ferrari 041 3.5 V12 | BRA; Ret | PAC; 2 | SMR; Ret | MON; 3 | ESP; Ret | CAN; 4 | | | | | | | | | | | | **3rd** | **41** |
| 1994 | Scuderia Ferrari | Ferrari 412T1B | Ferrari 041 3.5 V12 | | | | | | | FRA; 3 | GBR; Ret | | | | | | | | | | **3rd** | **41** |
| 1994 | Scuderia Ferrari | Ferrari 412T1B | Ferrari 043 3.5 V12 | | | | | | | | | **GER**; 1 | HUN; 12† | BEL; Ret | ITA; 2 | **POR**; Ret | EUR; 5 | JPN; Ret | AUS; 2 | | **3rd** | **41** |
| 1995 | Scuderia Ferrari | Ferrari 412T2 | Ferrari 044/1 3.0 V12 | BRA; 3 | ARG; 6 | SMR; 3 | ESP; 3 | MON; 3 | CAN; 11† | FRA; 12 | GBR; Ret | GER; 3 | HUN; 3 | **BEL**; Ret | ITA; Ret | POR; 4 | EUR; Ret | PAC; 4 | JPN; Ret | AUS; Ret | 6th | 31 |
| 1996 | Mild Seven Benetton Renault | Benetton B196 | Renault RS8 3.0 V10 | AUS; 4 | BRA; Ret | ARG; Ret | EUR; 9 | SMR; 3 | MON; Ret | ESP; Ret | CAN; Ret | FRA; 4 | GBR; 2 | GER; 13 | HUN; Ret | BEL; 6 | ITA; Ret | POR; 6 | JPN; 4 | | 6th | 21 |
| 1997 | Mild Seven Benetton Renault | Benetton B197 | Renault RS9 3.0 V10 | AUS; 4 | BRA; 2 | ARG; 6 | SMR; Ret | MON; 9 | ESP; 10 | CAN | FRA | GBR | **GER**; 1 | HUN; 8 | BEL; 6 | ITA; 7 | AUT; 10 | LUX; 4 | JPN; 8 | EUR; 4 | 5th | 27 |

^{‡} Berger was driving his team's "second entry", and as the team had only entered one car for the entire championship, the second entry was ineligible to score points.

^{†} Driver did not finish the race, but was still classified as they completed at least 90% of the race distance.

=== 24 Hours of Spa results ===
| Year | Entrant | No. | Car | Drivers | Class | Laps | Pos. | Class Pos. |
|---|---|---|---|---|---|---|---|---|
| 1985 | (Germany) Schnitzer Racing | 5 | BMW 635 CSi | (Italy) Roberto Ravaglia (Switzerland) Marc Surer | Group A | 500 | **1st** | **1st** |

Sporting positions
| Preceded by Tom Walkinshaw; Hans Heyer; Win Percy | Winner of the Spa 24 Hours; 1985; With: Roberto Ravaglia & Marc Surer | Succeeded by Dieter Quester; Altfrid Heger; Thierry Tassin |
