= Arrows A8 =

Formula One racing car

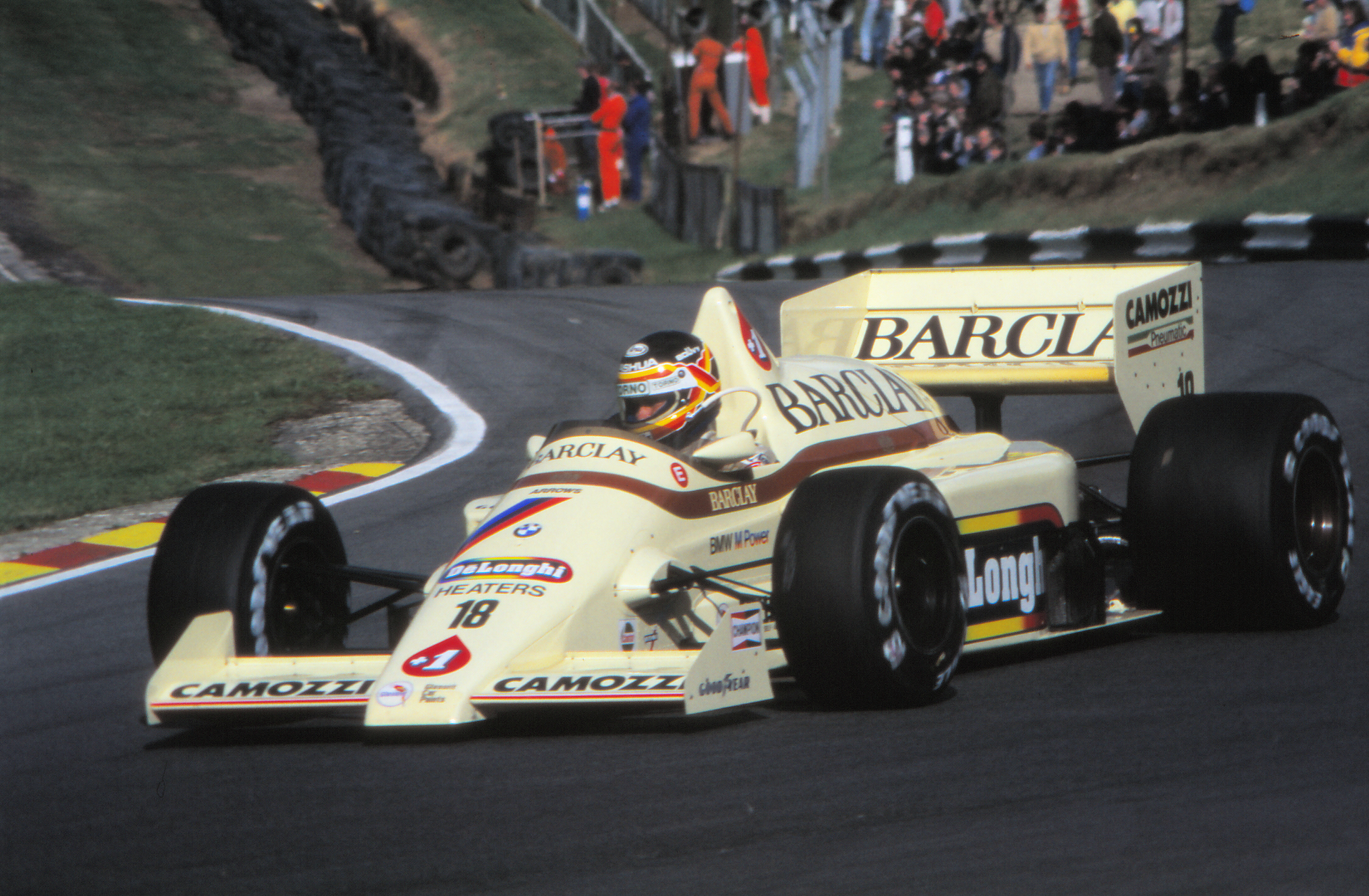
- Thierry Boutsen driving the A8 at the 1985 European Grand Prix
- Category: Formula One
- Constructor: Arrows
- Designer: Dave Wass
- Predecessor: A7
- Successor: A9

Technical specifications
- Chassis: Aluminium and carbon fibre monocoque
- Suspension (front): Double wishbones, push-rod dampers
- Suspension (rear): Double wishbones, pull-rod dampers
- Axle track: 1,778 millimetres (70.0 in) (Front); 1,651 millimetres (65.0 in) (Rear)
- Wheelbase: 2,794 millimetres (110.0 in)
- Engine: BMW M12/13, 1,499 cc (91.5 cu in), Straight 4, turbocharged, mid-engine, longitudinally mounted
- Transmission: Hewland 5-speed manual
- Power: 900 brake horsepower (670 kW) @ 10,500 rpm 545 newton-metres (402 lbf⋅ft) @ 8,500 rpm
- Weight: 540 kg (1,190 lb)
- Tyres: Goodyear

Competition history
- Notable entrants: Barclay Arrows BMW
- Notable drivers: (Austria) Gerhard Berger (Belgium) Thierry Boutsen (Switzerland) Marc Surer (Germany) Christian Danner
- Debut: 1985 Brazilian Grand Prix
- Last event: 1986 Australian Grand Prix
Races	Wins	Poles	F/Laps
32	0	0	0
- Constructors' Championships: 0
- Drivers' Championships: 0

The Arrows A8 was a Formula One car, designed by Dave Wass, which the Arrows team used to compete in the 1985 and 1986 Formula One seasons. Powered by the BMW M12 turbocharged engine, its best finish was when Thierry Boutsen drove it to second place at the 1985 San Marino Grand Prix.

== Design and development ==
The A8 was designed by Dave Wass and utilised a carbon-composite tub behind which was mounted the BMW M12 turbocharged engine, the team continuing the use of this powerplant from the previous season. The engines were maintained by Swiss engine guru Heini Mader. A total of five A8 cars were built for 1985.

== Racing history ==
=== 1985 season ===
For 1985, Arrows continued with the Belgian driver Thierry Boutsen while Gerhard Berger was contracted to drive the second entry. A podium finish was achieved by Boutsen at Imola where he placed third but was later moved to second when winner Alain Prost's McLaren was disqualified for being underweight.

Boutsen himself was lucky to finish the race having run out of fuel within sight of the flag, though he had enough momentum to be able to coast over the line still in third place. This proved to be the A8's high point as it was never again driven to a podium finish. The A8 scored 14 points during the 1985 season, placing Arrows eighth in the Constructors' Championship.

=== 1986 season ===
Arrows continued with the A8 for the 1986 season, with Marc Surer and Christian Danner nominated as drivers. The team could only place tenth in the Constructors' Championship final standings due to Danner scoring a solitary point for sixth place at the 1986 Austrian Grand Prix. The team introduced a new car, the A9, midseason at the Austrian Grand Prix where it was driven by Boutsen. After qualifying 21st, Boutsen retired from the race with turbo failure. After a further two races at which it failed to finish, the A9 was shelved and the team persevered with the A8 for the remainder of the season.

While Heini Mader did a good job in maintaining the team's BMW engines, they lacked the power of the same engines powering the Brabham and later Benetton teams as those particular engines were continually maintained by BMW, giving them access to new parts, information and factory backed development that Mader did not have. This was shown in the results as the Arrows-BMWs rarely out-qualified or out-raced the Brabhams or Benettons.

== Complete Formula One results ==
(key) (results in bold indicate pole position; results in italics indicate fastest lap)

Year	Entrant	Chassis	Engine	Tyres	Drivers	1	2	3	4	5	6	7	8	9	10	11	12	13	14	15	16	Points	WCC
1985	Barclay Arrows BMW	A8	BMW M12/13 Straight 4 tc	G		BRA	POR	SMR	MON	CAN	DET	FRA	GBR	GER	AUT	NED	ITA	BEL	EUR	RSA	AUS	14	8th
1985	Barclay Arrows BMW	A8	BMW M12/13 Straight 4 tc	G	Gerhard Berger	Ret	Ret	Ret	Ret	13	11	Ret	8	7	Ret	9	Ret	7	10	5	6	14	8th
1985	Barclay Arrows BMW	A8	BMW M12/13 Straight 4 tc	G	Thierry Boutsen	11	Ret	2	9	9	7	9	Ret	4	8	Ret	9	10	6	6	Ret	14	8th
1986	Barclay Arrows BMW	A8	BMW M12/13 Straight 4 tc	G		BRA	ESP	SMR	MON	BEL	CAN	DET	FRA	GBR	GER	HUN	AUT	ITA	POR	MEX	AUS	1	10th
1986	Barclay Arrows BMW	A8	BMW M12/13 Straight 4 tc	G	Marc Surer	Ret	Ret	9	9	9	DNS											1	10th
1986	Barclay Arrows BMW	A8	BMW M12/13 Straight 4 tc	G	Christian Danner							Ret	9	Ret	Ret		6	8	11	9	Ret	1	10th
1986	Barclay Arrows BMW	A8	BMW M12/13 Straight 4 tc	G	Thierry Boutsen	Ret	7	7	8	Ret	Ret	Ret	NC	8		Ret		7	10	7	Ret	1	10th
