= Thierry Boutsen =

Belgian racing driver (born 1957)

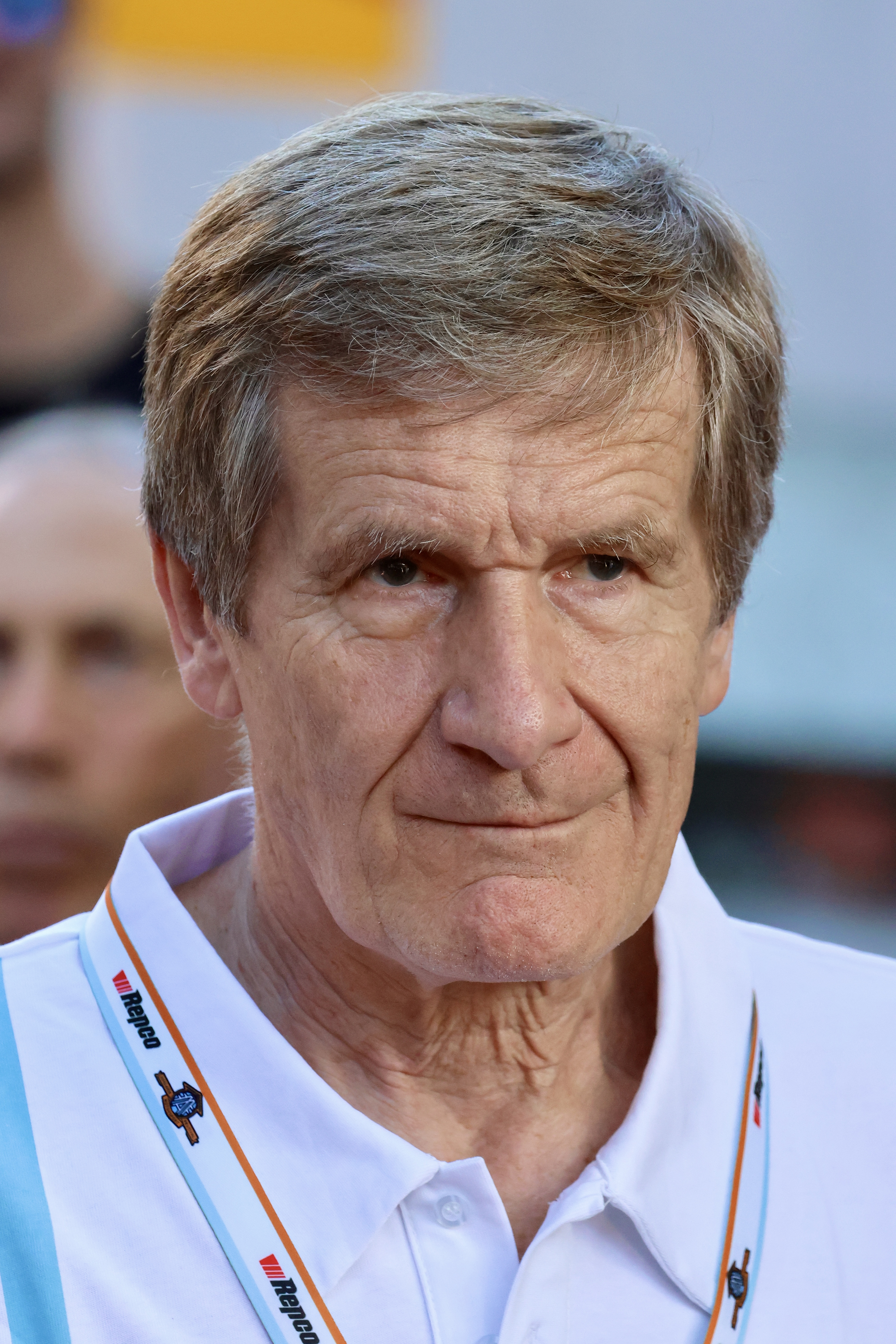
- Boutsen at the 2026 Adelaide Motorsport Festival
- Born: Thierry Marc Alain Boutsen; 13 July 1957 (age 69); Brussels, Belgium
- Spouse: Daniela Leite (m. 1993)
- Children: 4

Formula One World Championship career
- Nationality: (Belgium) Belgian
- Active years: 1983–1993
- Team(s): Arrows, Benetton, Williams, Ligier, Jordan
- Entries: 164 (163 starts)
- Championships: 0
- Wins: 3
- Podiums: 15
- Career points: 132
- Pole positions: 1
- Fastest laps: 1
- First entry: 1983 Belgian Grand Prix
- First win: 1989 Canadian Grand Prix
- Last win: 1990 Hungarian Grand Prix
- Last entry: 1993 Belgian Grand Prix

24 Hours of Le Mans career
- Years: 1981, 1983, 1986, 1993–1999
- Teams: Welter, Ford, Brun, Peugeot, Porsche, Toyota
- Best finish: 2nd (1993, 1996)
- Class wins: 1 (1996)

Thierry Marc Alain Boutsen (French: [tjɛ.ʁi but.sɛn]; born 13 July 1957) is a Belgian former racing driver, businessman and motorsport executive, who competed in Formula One from 1983 to 1993. Boutsen won three Formula One Grands Prix across 11 seasons.

Boutsen competed in Formula One for Arrows, Benetton, Williams, Ligier and Jordan. He finished fourth in the 1988 World Drivers' Championship with Benetton. Boutsen also competed in 10 editions of the 24 Hours of Le Mans from 1981 to 1999, finishing runner-up in 1993 and 1996 with Peugeot and Porsche, respectively.

Since retiring from motor racing, Boutsen has moved into the aviation industry, selling business jets from his firm in Monaco. He is also the founder, co-owner and advisor to Boutsen Racing, who have competed in touring car racing since 1998.

== Career ==
=== Junior formulae and sportscars ===
After winning the "Volant V" in 1977 at the André Pilette Racing School, Zolder, Boutsen entered the Belgian Formula Ford 1600 championship and won it in 1978 with 15 victories in 18 races. He also entered the 1978 Spa 24 Hours race, the last auto race on the old 14 km (8.7 mi) Spa-Francorchamps circuit- driving a Toyota Trueno. For 1979, he moved to Formula 3, winning three races in 1980 and second place in the European title race, behind Michele Alboreto. In 1981, he moved to Formula 2 and was again second in the European championship, including winning at the 14-mile Nürburgring- this time behind Geoff Lees.

Boutsen also entered the 1981 24 Hours of Le Mans. The race started at 3pm in unusually hot weather – one hour earlier than usual due to the Parliamentary elections held on the same weekend. At 4:06pm Boutsen suffered a massive accident just after the Hunaudières kink, some 400 metres (0.25 mi) before the Mulsanne bosse (the "hump") when his WM P81-Peugeot was travelling at some 350 km/h (217 mph). A suspension piece had failed and the car hit the guard-rail losing the entire rear end. Boutsen was untouched, but the debris field of hurled parts and bodywork was spread over 150 metres (490 ft). Three marshals and a gendarme were struck by the debris. One of them, Thierry Mabilat, was killed - struck in the chest by a detached piece of the guard rail. The other two marshals, Claude Hertault and Serge David (who lost an arm), and the gendarme were all seriously injured.

In 1983, Boutsen drove in the European Touring Car Championship and in World Sportscar races, where he won the very first Group C race, the Monza 1000 km with Bob Wollek driving a Porsche 956. He also won the famous Daytona 24-hour race in 1985, co-driving the Porsche 962 from the Preston Henn Racing with Bob Wollek, A. J. Foyt and Al Unser Sr.

=== Formula One ===
==== Arrows ====
Boutsen was considered a promising driver, testing for McLaren and Brabham. He was briefly attached to the Spirit Honda F1 project before losing out to his Formula Two teammate Stefan Johansson.

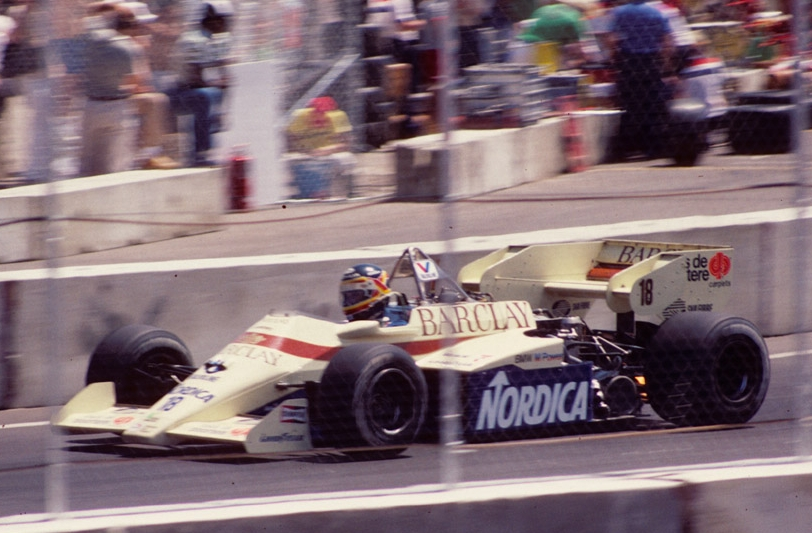
Boutsen driving for Arrows at the 1984 Dallas Grand Prix.

In 1983, Boutsen paid $500,000 for a drive in Formula One and made his debut with Arrows at his home race, the 1983 Belgian Grand Prix at the shortened 7 km (4.3 mi) Spa. While he scored no points in 1983, his careful handling and close performance compared to experienced teammate Marc Surer allowed him to foster a positive reputation within the team. With backing from Barclay cigarettes he remained with Arrows for a further three seasons. The first saw Arrows struggle with their difficult first turbocharged car, with powerful BMW turbo engines but poor handling. Boutsen scored points twice in the old Cosworth DFV powered A6 and once in the turbo machine. His second season saw several notable results, including second place at Imola. Boutsen crossed the line third, behind Alain Prost and Elio de Angelis but after the race, Prost was disqualified because his car was 2 kg underweight. Three more points scores saw him 11th overall in the standings. A final season with Arrows saw no points for Boutsen in an uncompetitive car, but in parallel to F1 he drove for the Walter Brun team in Group C and clinched the World Championship title with them in 1986, winning that year's Spa 1000 km.

==== Benetton ====
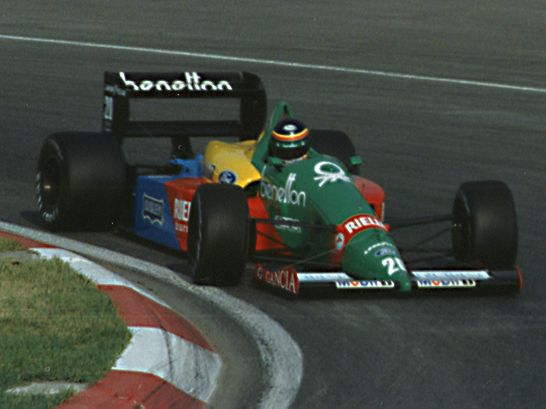
Boutsen driving for Benetton at the 1988 Canadian Grand Prix.

Boutsen got his big chance when he switched to the works Ford Europe F1 team, Benetton, for the 1987 season as teammate to Teo Fabi. While the package wasn't a race winner, it did allow him to run regularly in the top 6. He scored points in six races, his best being awarded third place in Adelaide after the disqualification of Ayrton Senna's Lotus and moved to eighth overall. At the Australian Grand Prix, Boutsen was furious with Fabi when the Italian refused to let his teammate lap him for a number of laps. When Boutsen confronted Fabi about this after the race, a frustrated Fabi (who had been unable to find an F1 drive for 1988), told the Belgian to "come back and see me when you have a pole position". Fabi scored no wins in his F1 career but did have three poles to his name while at that stage Boutsen could only boast his second place at Imola in 1985.

1988 saw Boutsen with a new teammate, the Italian Alessandro Nannini. When Cosworth stopped development of their turbocharged V6 engine, Benetton were forced to switch to normally aspirated Ford DFR V8 engines in anticipation of the banning of turbos in 1989. Boutsen's consistency, mechanical sympathy and speed in the Rory Byrne designed Benetton B188 saw him score points in 10 of the 16 races, including five third-place finishes (all behind the all-conquering McLaren-Honda cars), and place fourth overall as the best non-turbo driver in the field.

==== Williams ====
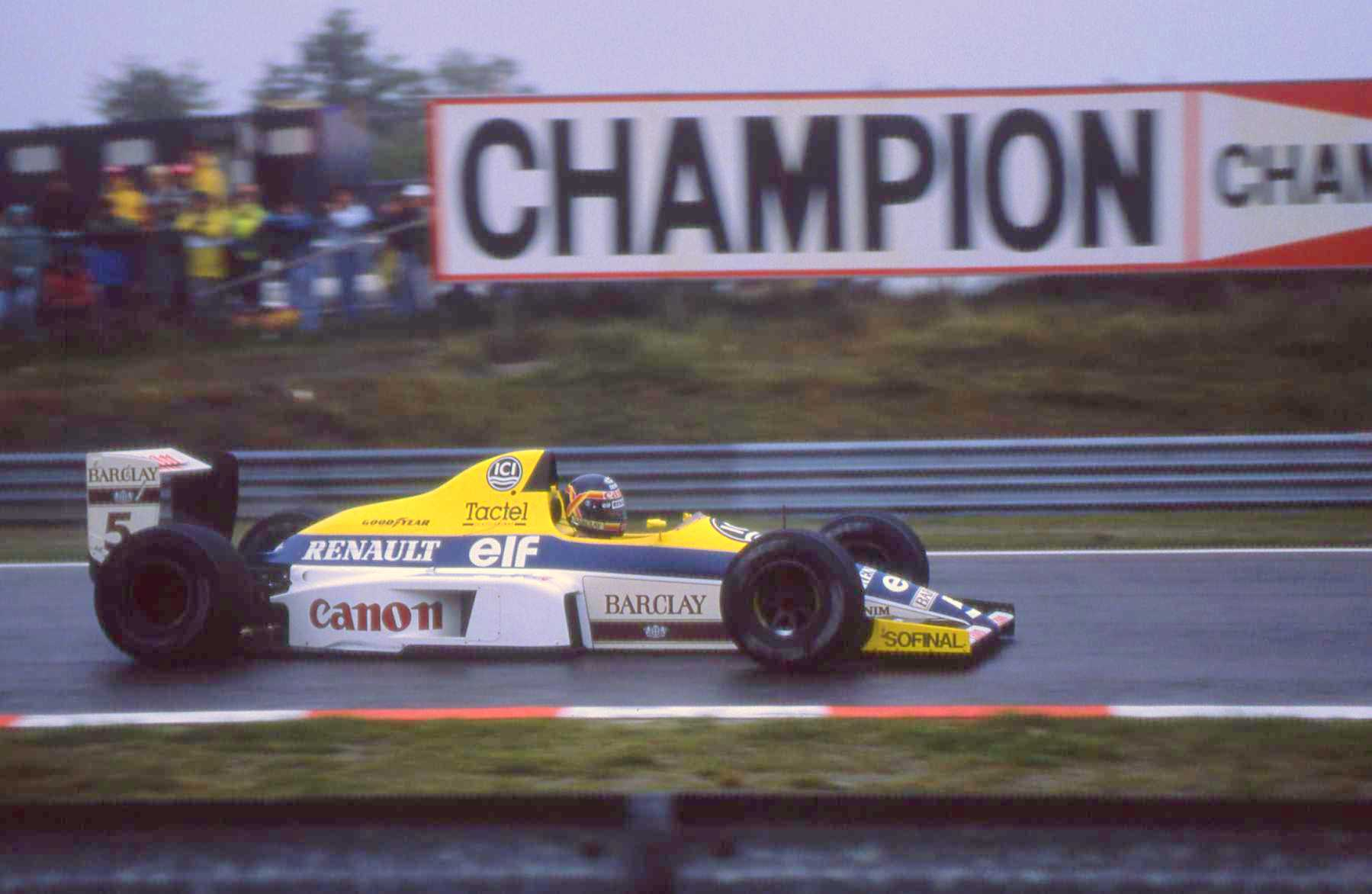
Boutsen driving the Williams FW12 at the 1989 Belgian Grand Prix

Frank Williams signed Boutsen in the summer of 1988 to replace Nigel Mansell for 1989 as Mansell had signed to move to Ferrari. Boutsen's reputation as a reliable, fast driver with good development skills saw Williams sign him on a two-year contract.

For 1989, Boutsen drove the new V10 Renault powered Williams FW12C. 1989 began with Boutsen on the back foot due to a heavy pre-season testing crash in Rio and because veteran teammate Riccardo Patrese had a major resurgence in form. However at the Canadian Grand Prix, Boutsen drove well in wet conditions and took his maiden victory after Senna suffered a late engine failure. Although it was a welcome win (Boutsen became the first new winner in F1 since former Arrows teammate Gerhard Berger had won the 1986 Mexican Grand Prix for Benetton), it was considered a lucky win for the Belgian as he had been last at one stage and had a full 360° spin, though luckily he managed to keep his car off the walls. He managed to catch and pass Patrese who was suffering with a loose undertray and took the lead three laps from the end when the Honda V10 engine in Senna's McLaren MP4/5 seized. Three more podium finishes came before Boutsen rounded the year off with a second victory at the rain-soaked Australian Grand Prix. Ironically Boutsen had been one of the drivers protesting about the conditions at the circuit before the race.

1990 saw more consistent points scoring drives, including Boutsen's third and final Grand Prix victory - a lights-to-flag victory in Hungary where he took his first pole position and held off sustained pressure from Alessandro Nannini (Benetton) and Ayrton Senna (McLaren) to win. However, with Nigel Mansell available in 1991, Williams felt they needed a 'star' driver to put together a championship bid. Despite Boutsen winning three races in two years to Patrese's one and finishing every race in 1990 in the points (top-six) barring retirements, the team felt that Patrese had been more consistent (and had worked well with Mansell in 1988) and decided to keep the Italian to drive alongside Mansell.

==== Ligier ====
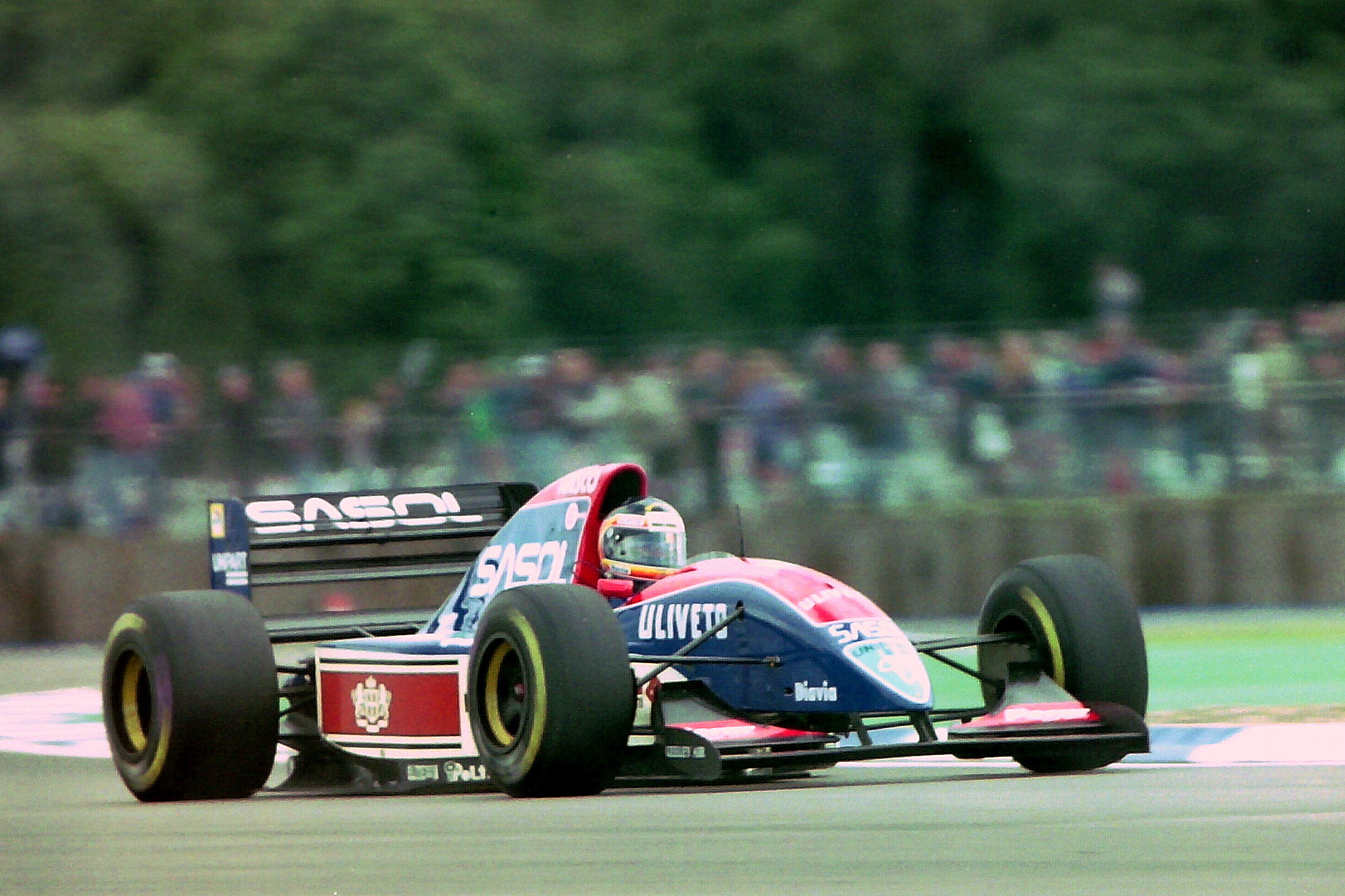
Boutsen driving for Jordan at the 1993 British Grand Prix.

With no vacancies among the top teams, Boutsen had to drop down to the Ligier team. Despite having a sizeable budget and Lamborghini V12 engines, the JS35 was an uncompetitive car and Boutsen was frequently unable to disguise his disgust with the machinery given to him. The arrival of Renault engines in 1992 improved matters a little and in his final race for the team he scored fifth place, his first points since leaving Williams.

==== Jordan ====
Initially, Boutsen was unable to find a drive for 1993, but Barclay secured him a slot at Jordan, replacing Ivan Capelli. Boutsen was too tall for the car and largely outpaced by young teammate Rubens Barrichello, failing to score any points in ten races. With Eddie Jordan keen to bring in younger, well-sponsored drivers to the seat the decision was taken to turn Boutsen's home race into a farewell event, though he retired on the first lap.

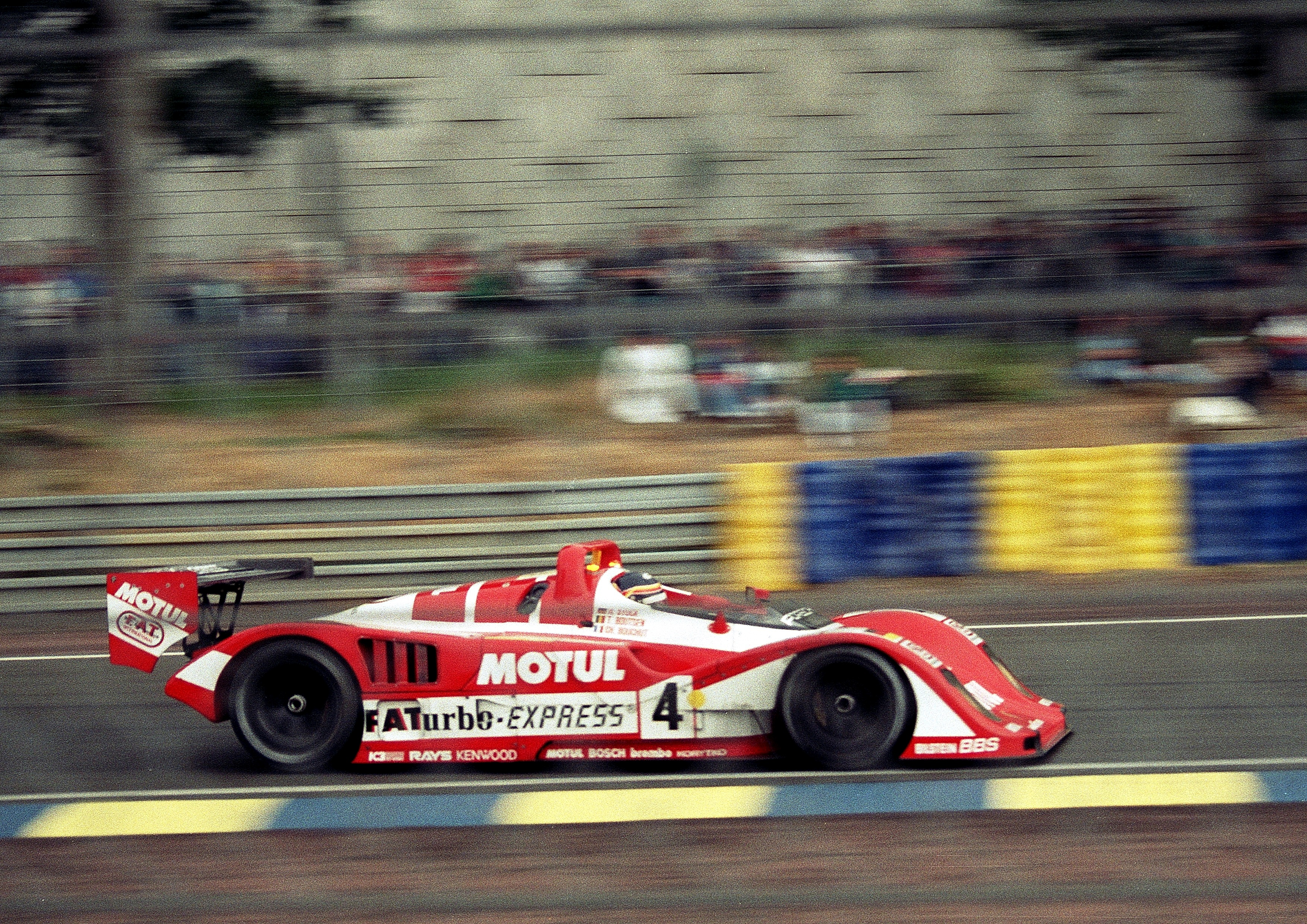
Boutsen competing at the 1995 24 Hours of Le Mans in a Kremer K8 Spyder

=== Touring cars ===
For 1994, Boutsen was hired by Ford Motorsport to lead their works challenge on the newly created Super Tourenwagen Cup in Germany. Driving a factory prepared Ford Mondeo built by Eggenberger Motorsport, that first season was a learning year for both Boutsen and the team.

The following year, Boutsen was joined by his old Williams teammate Riccardo Patrese, but the season was a disaster. Attempting to follow Audi's lead by developing a four-wheel drive car, the Mondeo was totally uncompetitive.

Boutsen started in only the first four races in 1996 before leaving the team and turning his attention to sports car racing. After three years of limited success, Ford pulled the plug on the project at the end of that season to focus solely on the British series.

=== Sportscars ===
Boutsen then drove sports cars in the US, driving for Champion Racing in a Porsche 911 GT1, alongside Bill Adam and Hans Stuck. The trio finished second in class at the 24 Hours of Daytona in 1997, Boutsen won the GT-1 US Championship with the Champion Racing in 1998. After being severely injured in a crash at Le Mans in 1999 at the wheel of a Toyota GT-One he retired from racing altogether.

== Helmet ==
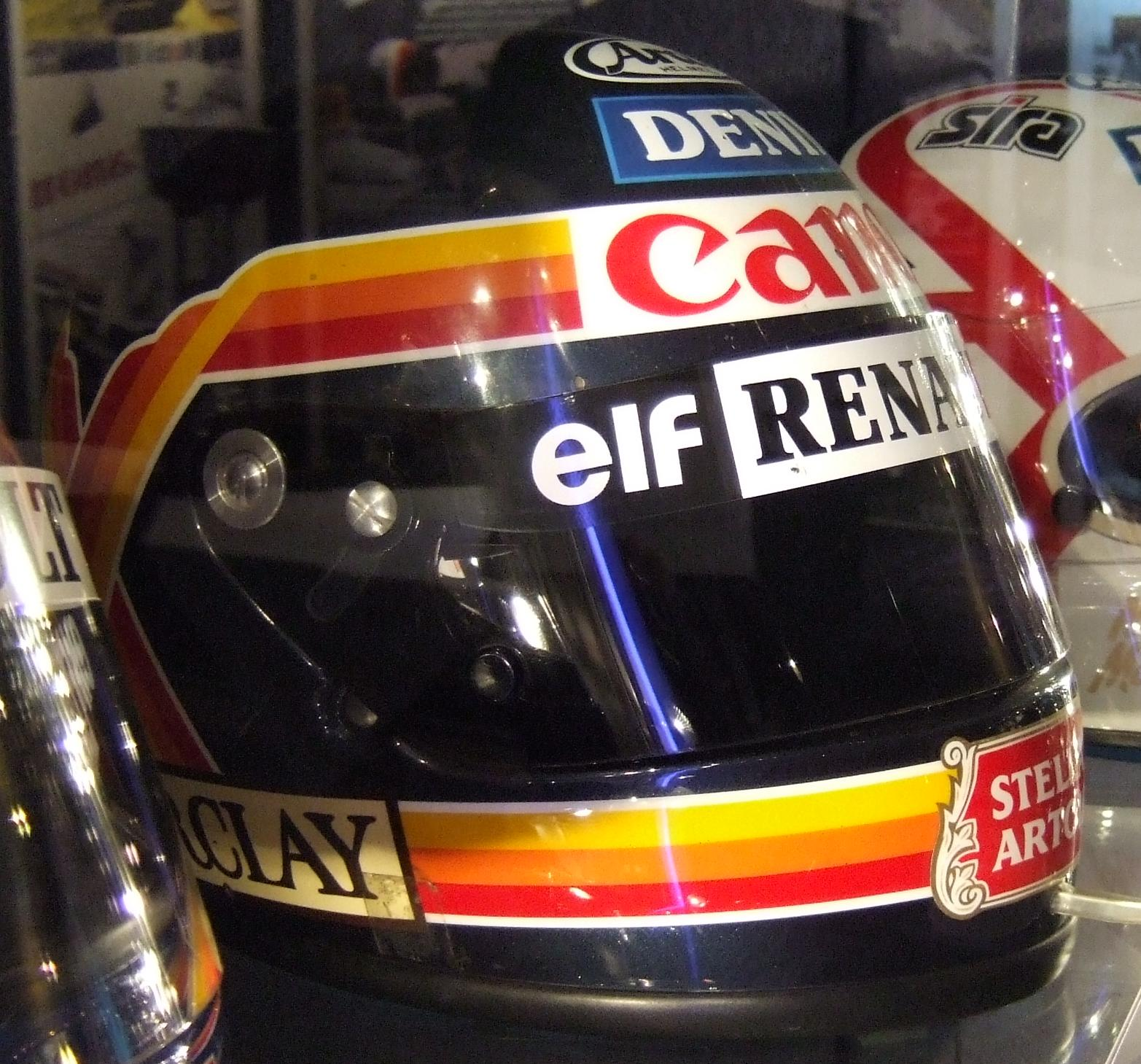
Boutsen's helmet on display at the Williams team's museum

Boutsen's helmet was black with a red, orange and yellow ribbon design surrounding the visor and the rear area. The colours used are the colours of the Belgian flag (except for orange).

== Business ==
Today, Boutsen runs his own company, Boutsen Aviation, in Monaco. Its business is the "Sale and Acquisition of Business Jets". He founded the company in 1997 with his wife Daniela and up to May 2011, the company had sold 205 aircraft, ranging from Airbus Corporate Jets to Cessna Citation. He is also co-owner of Boutsen Energy Racing alongside his brother-in-law Olivier Lainé and Georges Kaczka. The team competes in the Formula Le Mans class in the Le Mans Series. Boutsen also runs cars in Formula Renault and Eurocup Mégane Trophy.

== Racing record ==
=== Career summary ===
Season	Series	Team	Races	Wins	Poles	F/Laps	Podiums	Points	Position
1977	24 Hours of Spa-Francorchamps	Team Dubois	1	0	0	?	0	N/A	23rd
1978	24 Hours of Spa-Francorchamps	Luigi Racing	1	0	0	0	0	N/A	NC
1979	FIA European Formula 3	Roger Heavens Racing	10	0	0	0	0	6	13th
1979	Vandervell British Formula Three	Roger Heavens Racing	1	0	0	0	0	2	19th
1979	German Formula 3	Roger Heavens Racing	3	1	0	1	1	0	NC
1979	Formula 3 Radio Trent Trophy	Roger Heavens Racing	1	0	0	1	1	N/A	**2nd**
1979	World Challenge for Endurance Drivers	J. P. Willeme	1	0	0	0	0	0	NC
1980	FIA European Formula 3	Marlboro Racing for Zolder	14	3	2	3	6	54	**2nd**
1981	European Formula Two	Marlboro Racing for Zolder	12	2	5	2	5	37	**2nd**
1981	Japanese Formula Two	March Engineering	3	0	0	1	1	25	7th
1981	24 Hours of Le Mans	WM A.E.R.E.M.	1	0	0	0	0	N/A	DNF
1982	European Formula Two	Marlboro Team Spirit	13	3	3	0	6	50	**3rd**
1982	Japanese Formula Two	Marlboro Team Spirit	2	0	0	0	0	10	12th
1982	World Sportscar Championship	Ford France	2	0	0	0	0	0	NC
1983	Formula One	Arrows Racing Team	10	0	0	0	0	0	NC
1983	World Sportscar Championship	Canon Racing	2	0	0	0	1	44	6th
1983	World Sportscar Championship	Sorga S.A.	1	1	0	0	1	44	6th
1983	World Sportscar Championship	Ford France	1	0	0	0	0	44	6th
1983	World Sportscar Championship	Matsuda Collection	1	0	0	0	0	44	6th
1983	World Sportscar Championship	John Fitzpatrick Racing	1	0	0	0	0	44	6th
1984	Formula One	Barclay Nordica Arrows	15	0	0	0	0	5	15th
1984	World Sportscar Championship	Skoal Bandit Porsche Team	7	0	1	0	2	18	30th
1985	Formula One	Barclay Arrows BMW	16	0	0	0	1	11	11th
1985	World Sportscar Championship	Brun Motorsport	5	0	0	1	1	13	31st
1986	Formula One	Barclay Arrows BMW	16	0	0	0	0	0	NC
1986	World Sportscar Championship	Brun Motorsport	7	1	2	0	2	41	9th
1987	Formula One	Benetton Formula	16	0	0	0	1	16	8th
1987	World Touring Car Championship	Eggenberger Motorsport	1	0	1	0	0	0	NC
1988	Formula One	Benetton Formula	16	0	0	0	5	27	4th
1989	Formula One	Canon Williams	16	2	0	0	5	37	5th
1990	Formula One	Canon Williams	16	1	1	1	3	34	6th
1991	Formula One	Équipe Ligier Gitanes	16	0	0	0	0	0	NC
1992	Formula One	Ligier Gitanes Blondes	16	0	0	0	0	2	14th
1993	Formula One	Sasol Jordan	10	0	0	0	0	0	NC
1993	24 Hours of Le Mans	Peugeot Talbot Sport	1	0	0	0	1	N/A	**2nd**
1994	Super Tourenwagen Cup	Eggenberger Motorsport	8	0	0	0	0	23	10th
1994	24 Hours of Le Mans	Dauer Racing/Le Mans Porsche Team	1	0	0	1	1	N/A	**3rd**
1995	Super Tourenwagen Cup	Ford Mondeo Team Schübel	16	0	0	0	0	95	18th
1995	24 Hours of Le Mans	Porsche Kremer Racing	1	0	0	0	0	N/A	6th
1996	Super Tourenwagen Cup	Ford Mondeo Team Schübel	4	0	0	0	0	21	30th
1996	BPR Global GT Series	Porsche AG	2	2	0	2	2	N/A	NC
1996	24 Hours of Le Mans	Porsche AG	1	0	0	0	1	N/A	**2nd**
1997	FIA GT Championship	Porsche AG	10	0	0	0	0	18	15th
1997	24 Hours of Le Mans	Porsche AG	1	0	0	0	0	N/A	DNF
1998	24 Hours of Le Mans	Toyota Motorsport	1	0	0	0	0	N/A	DNF
1999	24 Hours of Le Mans	Toyota Motorsport	1	0	0	0	0	N/A	DNF

=== Complete European Formula Two Championship results ===
(key) (Races in bold indicate pole position; races in italics indicate fastest lap)

Year	Entrant	Chassis	Engine	1	2	3	4	5	6	7	8	9	10	11	12	13	Pos.	Points
1981	Marlboro Racing for Zolder	March 812	BMW	SIL; Ret	HOC; Ret	**THR**; Ret	NÜR; 1	VAL; 3	**MUG**; Ret	PAU; 2	**PER**; 1	**SPA**; 2	DON; 12	**MIS**; 8	MAN; 4		**2nd**	**37**
1982	Marlboro Team Spirit	Spirit 201	Honda	SIL; 12	HOC; 2	THR; 3	NÜR; 1	MUG; 4	VAL; 6	**PAU**; 2	SPA; 1	**HOC**; Ret	DON; 9	MAN; 4	**PER**; 1	MIS; 6	**3rd**	**50**

=== Complete All Japan Formula 2 Championship results ===
(key) (Races in bold indicate pole position) (Races in italics indicate fastest lap)

Year	Entrant	Chassis	Engine	1	2	3	4	5	6	DC	Points
1981	Walter Wolf Racing Japan	March 802	BMW M12	SUZ	SUZ; 7					7th	25
1981	Racing Mate Project Team	March 812	BMW M12			SUZ; 6	SUZ	SUZ; 2		7th	25
1982	Marlboro Team Spirit	Spirit 201	Honda RA262E	SUZ	FUJ	SUZ	SUZ	SUZ; 4	SUZ; 15	12th	10

=== Complete World Sportscar Championship results ===
(key) (Races in bold indicate pole position; results in italics indicate fastest lap)

Year	Entrant	Chassis	Engine	Class	1	2	3	4	5	6	7	8	9	10	11	Pos.	Points
1982	Ford France	Rondeau M382	Ford Cosworth DFL 3.3 L V8	Group C	MNZ	SIL	NÜR	LMS	SPA; Ret	MUG	FUJ; Ret	BRH				NC	0
1983	Sorga S.A.	Porsche 956	Porsche Type-935/76 2.6 L Turbo Flat-6	Group C	MNZ; 1											6th	44
1983	Canon Racing	Porsche 956	Porsche Type-935/76 2.6 L Turbo Flat-6	Group C		SIL; 3	NÜR		SPA; 9							6th	44
1983	Matsuda Collection	Porsche 956	Porsche Type-935/76 2.6 L Turbo Flat-6	Group C						FUJ; 4						6th	44
1983	John Fitzpatrick Racing	Porsche 956	Porsche Type-935/76 2.6 L Turbo Flat-6	Group C							KYA; Ret					6th	44
1983	Ford France	Rondeau M382	Ford Cosworth DFL 3.3 L V8	Group C				LMS; Ret								6th	44
1984	Skoal Bandit Porsche Team	Porsche 956B	Porsche Type-935/76 2.6 L Turbo Flat-6	Group C	MNZ; Ret	SIL; 8	LMS	NÜR; 2	BRH; 3†	MOS	SPA; Ret	IMO; Ret	FUJ; DNA	KYA	SAN; Ret	30th	18
1984	Skoal Bandit Porsche Team	Porsche 962	Porsche Type-935/76 2.6 L Turbo Flat-6	Group C					BRH; 6†							30th	18
1985	Brun Motorsport	Porsche 962C	Porsche Type-935/76 2.6 L Turbo Flat-6	Group C1	MUG; 3	MNZ; DSQ	SIL; 10	LMS								31st	13
1985	Brun Motorsport	Porsche 956B	Porsche Type-935/76 2.6 L Turbo Flat-6	Group C1					HOC; Ret	MOS	SPA; Ret	BRH	FUJ	SHA		31st	13
1986	Brun Motorsport	Porsche 962C	Porsche Type-935/76 2.6 L Turbo Flat-6	Group C1	MNZ; 5	SIL; 11					**NÜR**; Ret	**SPA**; 1	FUJ			9th	41
1986	Brun Motorsport	Porsche 956	Porsche Type-935/79 2.6 L Turbo Flat-6	Group C1			LMS; Ret	NOR; 9	BRH; 3	JER						9th	41

^{†} Boutsen drove as part of both Skoal Bandit Porsche Team entries, but did not complete the minimum percentage amount of laps in either car to be eligible for points.

=== Complete Formula One results ===
(key) (Races in bold indicate pole position; races in italics indicate fastest lap)

Year	Team	Chassis	Engine	1	2	3	4	5	6	7	8	9	10	11	12	13	14	15	16	WDC	Points
1983	Arrows Racing Team	Arrows A6	Ford DFV 3.0 V8	BRA	USW	FRA	SMR	MON	BEL; Ret	DET; 7	CAN; 7	GBR; 15	GER; 9	AUT; 13	NED; 14	ITA; Ret	EUR; 11	RSA; 9		NC	0
1984	Barclay Nordica Arrows	Arrows A6	Ford DFV 3.0 V8	BRA; 6	RSA; 12		SMR; 5													15th	5
1984	Barclay Nordica Arrows	Arrows A7	BMW M12/13 1.5 L4t			BEL; Ret		FRA; 11	MON; DNQ	CAN; Ret	DET; Ret	DAL; Ret	GBR; Ret	GER; Ret	AUT; 5	NED; Ret	ITA; 10	EUR; 9	POR; Ret	15th	5
1985	Barclay Arrows BMW	Arrows A8	BMW M12/13 1.5 L4t	BRA; 11	POR; Ret	SMR; 2†	MON; 9	CAN; 9	DET; 7	FRA; 9	GBR; Ret	GER; 4	AUT; 8	NED; Ret	ITA; 9	BEL; 10	EUR; 6	RSA; 6	AUS; Ret	11th	11
1986	Barclay Arrows BMW	Arrows A8	BMW M12/13 1.5 L4t	BRA; Ret	ESP; 7	SMR; 7	MON; 8	BEL; Ret	CAN; Ret	DET; Ret	FRA; NC	GBR; NC		HUN; Ret		ITA; 7	POR; 10	MEX; 7	AUS; Ret	NC	0
1986	Barclay Arrows BMW	Arrows A9	BMW M12/13 1.5 L4t										GER; Ret		AUT; Ret					NC	0
1987	Benetton Formula	Benetton B187	Ford GBA 1.5 V6t	BRA; 5	SMR; Ret	BEL; Ret	MON; Ret	DET; Ret	FRA; Ret	GBR; 7	GER; Ret	HUN; 4	AUT; 4	ITA; 5	POR; 14	ESP; 16	MEX; Ret	JPN; 5	AUS; 3	8th	16
1988	Benetton Formula	Benetton B188	Ford DFR 3.5 V8	BRA; 7	SMR; 4	MON; 8	MEX; 8	CAN; 3	DET; 3	FRA; Ret	GBR; Ret	GER; 6	HUN; 3	BEL; DSQ	ITA; 6	POR; 3	ESP; 9	JPN; 3	AUS; 5	4th	27
1989	Canon Williams	Williams FW12C	Renault RS1 3.5 V10	BRA; Ret	SMR; 4	MON; 10	MEX; Ret	USA; 6	CAN; 1	FRA; Ret	GBR; 10	GER; Ret	HUN; 3	BEL; 4	ITA; 3					5th	37
1989	Canon Williams	Williams FW13	Renault RS1 3.5 V10													POR; Ret	ESP; Ret	JPN; 3	AUS; 1	5th	37
1990	Canon Williams	Williams FW13B	Renault RS2 3.5 V10	USA; 3	BRA; 5	SMR; Ret	MON; 4	CAN; Ret	MEX; 5	FRA; Ret	GBR; 2	GER; 6	**HUN**; 1	BEL; Ret	ITA; Ret	POR; Ret	ESP; 4	JPN; 5	AUS; 5	6th	34
1991	Équipe Ligier Gitanes	Ligier JS35	Lamborghini LE3512 3.5 V12	USA; Ret	BRA; 10	SMR; 7	MON; 7	CAN; Ret	MEX; 8											NC	0
1991	Équipe Ligier Gitanes	Ligier JS35B	Lamborghini LE3512 3.5 V12							FRA; 12	GBR; Ret	GER; 9	HUN; 17	BEL; 11	ITA; Ret	POR; 16	ESP; Ret	JPN; 9	AUS; Ret	NC	0
1992	Ligier Gitanes Blondes	Ligier JS37	Renault RS3C 3.5 V10	RSA; Ret	MEX; 10	BRA; Ret	ESP; Ret	SMR; Ret	MON; 12	CAN; 10	FRA; Ret	GBR; 10	GER; 7	HUN; Ret	BEL; Ret	ITA; Ret	POR; 8	JPN; Ret	AUS; 5	14th	2
1993	Sasol Jordan	Jordan 193	Hart 1035 3.5 V10	RSA	BRA	EUR; Ret	SMR; Ret	ESP; 11	MON; Ret	CAN; 12	FRA; 11	GBR; Ret	GER; 13	HUN; 9	BEL; Ret	ITA	POR	JPN	AUS	NC	0

=== Complete 24 Hours of Le Mans results ===
Year	Team	Co-Drivers	Car	Class	Laps	Pos.	Class Pos.
1981	(France) WM A.E.R.E.M.	(France) Serge Saulnier (France) Michel Pignard	WM P81- Peugeot	C	15	DNF	DNF
1983	Ford France	(France) Henri Pescarolo	Rondeau M482-Ford Cosworth	C	174	DNF	DNF
1986	(Switzerland) Brun Motorsport	(France) Alain Ferté (Belgium) Didier Theys	Porsche 956	C1	89	DNF	DNF
1993	(France) Peugeot Talbot Sport	(France) Yannick Dalmas (Italy) Teo Fabi	Peugeot 905 Evo 1B	C1	374	**2nd**	**2nd**
1994	(Germany) Le Mans Porsche Team (Germany) Joest Racing	(Germany) Hans-Joachim Stuck (United States) Danny Sullivan	Dauer 962 Le Mans	GT1	343	**3rd**	**2nd**
1995	(Germany) Porsche Kremer Racing	(Germany) Hans-Joachim Stuck (France) Christophe Bouchut	Kremer K8 Spyder	WSC	289	6th	**2nd**
1996	(Germany) Porsche AG	(Germany) Hans-Joachim Stuck (France) Bob Wollek	Porsche 911 GT1	GT1	353	**2nd**	**1st**
1997	(Germany) Porsche AG	(Germany) Hans-Joachim Stuck (France) Bob Wollek	Porsche 911 GT1	GT1	238	DNF	DNF
1998	(Japan) Toyota Motorsport (Germany) Toyota Team Europe	(Germany) Ralf Kelleners (United Kingdom) Geoff Lees	Toyota GT-One	GT1	330	DNF	DNF
1999	(Japan) Toyota Motorsport (Germany) Toyota Team Europe	(Germany) Ralf Kelleners (United Kingdom) Allan McNish	Toyota GT-One	LMGTP	173	DNF	DNF

=== Complete 24 Hours of Spa results ===
Year	Team	Co-Drivers	Car	Class	Laps	Pos.	Class Pos.
1978	(Belgium) Luigi Racing	(Belgium) Marc Duez (Italy) Lella Lombardi	Toyota Sprinter Trueno	1	5	DNF	DNF
1979	(Belgium) J. P. Willeme	(Belgium) Pierre Dieudonné	BMW 530i			DNF	DNF
1983	(Belgium) SJA/Texaco Racing Team	(France) Claude Ballot-Léna (France) Thierry Sabine	BMW 635 CSi	3		DNF	DNF
1985	(Switzerland) Brun Motorsport	(Switzerland) Walter Brun (Germany) Harald Grohs	BMW 635 CSi	3	264	DNF	DNF
1986	BMW Belgium	(Switzerland) Enzo Calderari (Germany) Hans Heyer	BMW 635 CSi	3	85	DNF	DNF
1987	(Switzerland) Ford Texaco Racing Team	(Germany) Klaus Ludwig (Germany) Klaus Niedzwiedz	Ford Sierra RS Cosworth	3	406	DNF	DNF
1988	(Switzerland) Ford Texaco Eggenberger Racing Team	(Belgium) Pierre Dieudonné (Germany) Klaus Ludwig	Ford Sierra RS 500 Cosworth	3	506	2nd	1st
1998	(Belgium) Ecurie Toison d'Or	(Belgium) Jean-Michel Martin (Belgium) Frédéric Moreau	BMW 320i	SP	458	12th	11th

=== Complete Super Tourenwagen Cup results ===
(key) (Races in bold indicate pole position) (Races in italics indicate fastest lap)

Year	Team	Car	1	2	3	4	5	6	7	8	9	10	11	12	13	14	15	16	17	18	Pos.	Points
1994	Eggenberger Motorsport	Ford Mondeo Ghia	AVU; 4	WUN; 11	ZOL; 14	ZAN; Ret	ÖST; 7	SAL; 6	SPA; Ret	NÜR; 8											10th	23
1995	Ford Mondeo Team Schübel	Ford Mondeo 4x4	ZOL; 1; 10	ZOL; 2 Ret	SPA; 1 Ret	SPA; 2 NC	ÖST; 1; 22	ÖST; 2 Ret	HOC; 1 NC	HOC; 2; 12	NÜR; 1 Ret	NÜR; 2; 15	SAL; 1; 14	SAL; 2 Ret	AVU; 1; 14	AVU; 2; 10	NÜR; 1; 14	NÜR; 2; 10			18th	95
1996	Ford Mondeo Team Schübel	Ford Mondeo Ghia	ZOL; 1; 13	ZOL; 2 Ret	ASS; 1; 18	ASS; 2; 16	HOC; 1	HOC; 2	SAC; 1	SAC; 2	WUN; 1	WUN; 2	ZWE; 1	ZWE; 2	SAL; 1	SAL; 2	AVU; 1	AVU; 2	NÜR; 1	NÜR; 2	30th	21

=== Complete FIA GT Championship results ===
(key) (Races in bold indicate pole position) (Races in italics indicate fastest lap)

Year	Team	Car	Class	1	2	3	4	5	6	7	8	9	10	11	Pos.	Points
1997	Porsche AG	Porsche 911 GT1	GT1	HOC; 4	SIL; 5	HEL									15th	18
1997	Porsche AG	Porsche 911 GT1 Evo	GT1				NÜR; 10	SPA; Ret	A1R; 6	SUZ; 5	DON; 11	MUG; 4	SEB; 6	LAG; 5	15th	18
