= 1985 San Marino Grand Prix =

- Race 3 of 16 in the 1985 Formula One World Championship
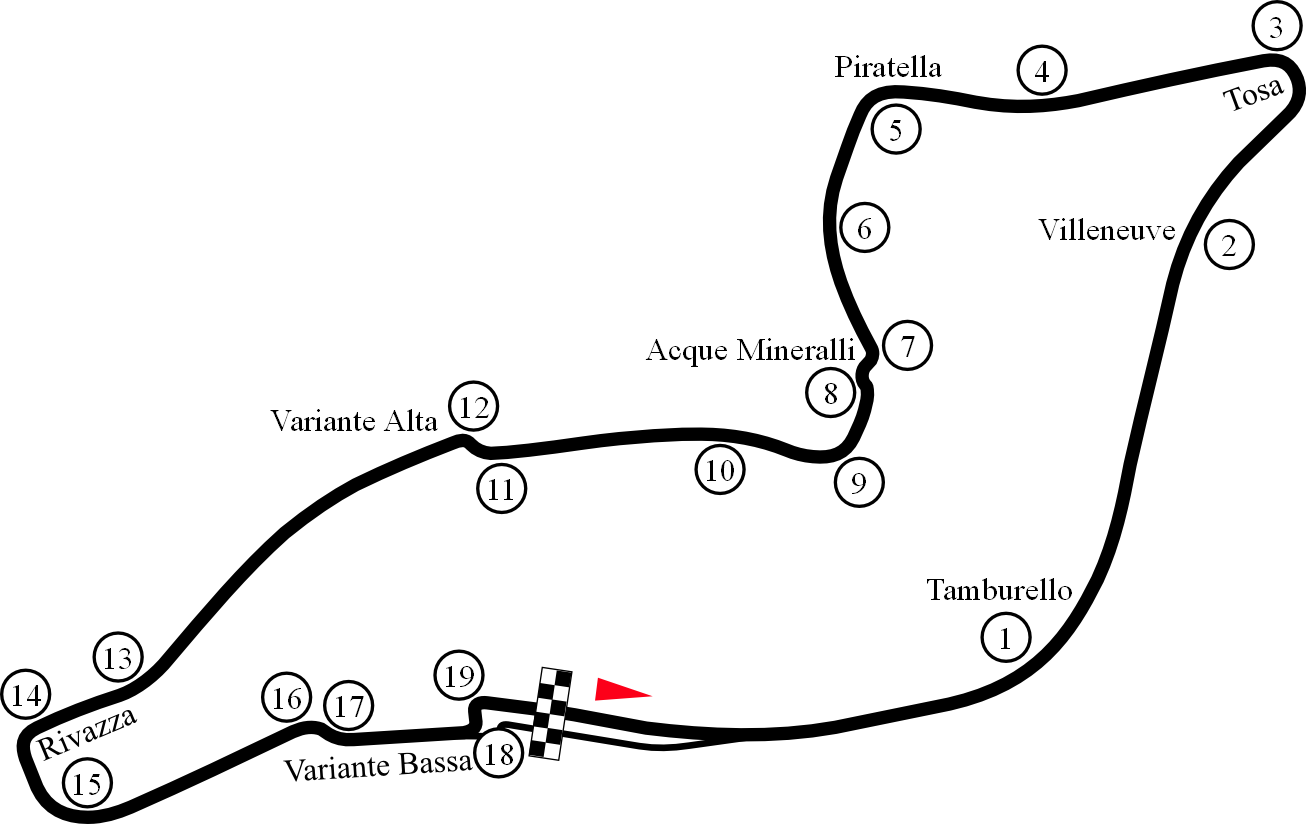

Race details
- Date: 5 May 1985
- Location: Autodromo Dino Ferrari; Imola, Emilia-Romagna, Italy
- Course: Permanent racing facility
- Course length: 5.040 km (3.132 miles)
- Distance: 60 laps, 302.400 km (187.902 miles)

Pole position
| Driver | (Brazil) Ayrton Senna | Lotus-Renault |
- Time: 1:27.327

Fastest lap
| Driver | (Italy) Michele Alboreto | Ferrari |
- Time: 1:30.961 on lap 29

Podium
| First | (Italy) Elio de Angelis | Lotus-Renault |
| Second | (Belgium) Thierry Boutsen | Arrows-BMW |
| Third | (France) Patrick Tambay | Renault |

The 1985 San Marino Grand Prix was a Formula One motor race held at Imola on 5 May 1985. It was the third race of the 1985 Formula One World Championship. The 60-lap race was won by local driver Elio de Angelis, driving a Lotus-Renault, after McLaren driver Alain Prost had been disqualified for being underweight. It was de Angelis' second and last win. Thierry Boutsen was second in an Arrows-BMW, with Patrick Tambay third in a factory Renault.

Elio de Angelis was the first Italian driver to win the San Marino Grand Prix.

== Qualifying ==
=== Qualifying report ===
Before the previous race in Portugal it was revealed that René Arnoux had been fired by Ferrari, with no explanation ever given for his sudden departure by either the team or Arnoux. In his place was Swedish driver Stefan Johansson. Arnoux was in the pits at Imola, but was seen with the Brabham team, starting a false rumor he would soon join the team alongside Nelson Piquet. As it turned out, Arnoux would not drive in F1 again until joining Ligier in 1986.

Ayrton Senna took pole position in his Lotus-Renault with a time of 1:27.327, with Keke Rosberg alongside him on the front row in the Williams-Honda. For Senna it would be the first of seven consecutive pole positions at Imola, a run which ended in 1992.

Filling the second row were Elio de Angelis in the second Lotus and Michele Alboreto in the Ferrari. Belgian Thierry Boutsen was a surprise 5th fastest in the Arrows-BMW, ahead of the McLaren-TAG of Alain Prost. In his second race for Ferrari, Johansson qualified 15th.

=== Qualifying classification ===
| Pos | No | Driver | Constructor | Q1 | Q2 | Gap |
|---|---|---|---|---|---|---|
| 1 | 12 | (Brazil) Ayrton Senna | Lotus-Renault | 1:27.589 | 1:27.327 | |
| 2 | 6 | (Finland) Keke Rosberg | Williams-Honda | 1:28.347 | 1:27.354 | +0.027 |
| 3 | 11 | (Italy) Elio de Angelis | Lotus-Renault | 1:30.325 | 1:27.852 | +0.525 |
| 4 | 27 | (Italy) Michele Alboreto | Ferrari | 1:27.871 | 1:30.637 | +0.544 |
| 5 | 18 | (Belgium) Thierry Boutsen | Arrows-BMW | 1:28.829 | 1:27.918 | +0.591 |
| 6 | 2 | (France) Alain Prost | McLaren-TAG | 1:28.604 | 1:28.099 | +0.772 |
| 7 | 5 | (United Kingdom) Nigel Mansell | Williams-Honda | 1:29.756 | 1:28.202 | +0.875 |
| 8 | 1 | (Austria) Niki Lauda | McLaren-TAG | 1:29.413 | 1:28.399 | +1.072 |
| 9 | 7 | (Brazil) Nelson Piquet | Brabham-BMW | 1:29.427 | 1:28.489 | +1.162 |
| 10 | 17 | (Austria) Gerhard Berger | Arrows-BMW | 1:28.697 | 1:29.654 | +1.370 |
| 11 | 15 | (France) Patrick Tambay | Renault | 1:30.201 | 1:29.102 | +1.775 |
| 12 | 23 | (United States) Eddie Cheever | Alfa Romeo | 1:30.605 | 1:29.259 | +1.932 |
| 13 | 25 | (Italy) Andrea de Cesaris | Ligier-Renault | 1:30.339 | 1:29.406 | +2.079 |
| 14 | 16 | (United Kingdom) Derek Warwick | Renault | 1:30.440 | 1:29.466 | +2.139 |
| 15 | 28 | (Sweden) Stefan Johansson | Ferrari | 1:30.240 | 1:29.806 | +2.479 |
| 16 | 26 | (France) Jacques Laffite | Ligier-Renault | 1:31.625 | 1:30.982 | +3.655 |
| 17 | 30 | (United Kingdom) Jonathan Palmer | Zakspeed | 2:30.990 | 1:31.028 | +3.701 |
| 18 | 22 | (Italy) Riccardo Patrese | Alfa Romeo | 1:31.388 | 1:31.108 | +3.781 |
| 19 | 29 | (Italy) Pierluigi Martini | Minardi-Motori Moderni | 1:32.770 | 1:48.391 | +5.443 |
| 20 | 8 | (France) François Hesnault | Brabham-BMW | 1:33.142 | 1:33.160 | +5.815 |
| 21 | 10 | (France) Philippe Alliot | RAM-Hart | 1:34.201 | 2:05.141 | +6.874 |
| 22 | 24 | (Italy) Piercarlo Ghinzani | Osella-Alfa Romeo | 1:34.974 | 1:34.209 | +6.882 |
| 23 | 9 | (West Germany) Manfred Winkelhock | RAM-Hart | 1:34.936 | 1:34.579 | +7.252 |
| 24 | 4 | (West Germany) Stefan Bellof | Tyrrell-Ford | 1:35.774 | 1:35.653 | +8.326 |
| 25 | 3 | (United Kingdom) Martin Brundle | Tyrrell-Ford | 1:36.397 | 1:36.661 | +9.070 |
| 26 | 21 | (Italy) Mauro Baldi | Spirit-Hart | 1:36.922 | 1:38.235 | +9.595 |

== Race ==
=== Race report ===
Limited fuel allowances played a big part in the race, as a succession of drivers ran out of fuel in the last few laps. Prost took the chequered flag before stopping on the slowing-down lap and hitching a ride with Patrick Tambay on the side pod to return to the pits. Later, Prost's car was found to be 2 kg (4.4 lb) below the minimum permitted weight in post-race scrutineering, resulting in his disqualification. Summing up the general feeling that FISA's fuel limit rules had seen Formula One races reduced to mere economy runs, Williams driver Nigel Mansell noted that "it wasn't really racing".

Following this, until the end of the turbo era at the end of 1988, McLaren drivers would routinely pull up just beyond the finish line after a race so as to leave as much fuel in the tank as possible and avoid being underweight. It would actually become a common sight during this time to see all finishing cars pulling up just beyond the line in order to beat the weight limit.

Stefan Johansson ran a good race in his second drive for Ferrari. After starting 15th he steadily made his way through the field and by late in the race had moved to second (benefiting from others running out of fuel) and was poised to benefit from Senna also running dry 3 laps from home. Johansson took the lead from the Lotus to a thunderous applause from the Tifosi, only to run out of fuel himself half a lap later coming out of the Acque Minerali chicane. A post race examination of his car revealed the Ferrari had an electrical malfunction and a tiny, barely visible crack in the turbo pipe that caused the engine to use more fuel than the readout was telling the team or Johansson. The Ferrari's readout had told Johansson that he still had enough fuel to finish the race.

Prost's disqualification promoted de Angelis to the win, his second and last in F1, even though at no point did he ever actually lead the race. Second place was thus awarded to Boutsen — who ran out of fuel as he reached the start-finish straight on his final lap and pushed his Arrows-BMW across the finish line to secure his finishing position (unlike Prost's McLaren, the Arrows was still over the weight limit), with third going to Frenchman Patrick Tambay who had won the race for Ferrari in 1983, his 2nd of two F1GP race wins. This would turn out to be the last podium finish for both Tambay and the original factory Renault team.

Mauro Baldi and Spirit Racing entered their last Grand Prix: the small British team were having financial troubles and the Toleman team, via their new major sponsor, Italian fashion house Benetton, offered to buy the Spirit team. The offer was accepted and the Benetton Group immediately transferred Spirit's existing Pirelli tyre contract to Toleman, allowing them to race from the next round in Monaco.

=== Race classification ===
| Pos | No | Driver | Constructor | Laps | Time/Retired | Grid | Points |
|---|---|---|---|---|---|---|---|
| 1 | 11 | (Italy) Elio de Angelis | Lotus-Renault | 60 | 1:34:35.955 | 3 | 9 |
| 2 | 18 | (Belgium) Thierry Boutsen | Arrows-BMW | 59 | Out of fuel | 5 | 6 |
| 3 | 15 | (France) Patrick Tambay | Renault | 59 | + 1 Lap | 11 | 4 |
| 4 | 1 | (Austria) Niki Lauda | McLaren-TAG | 59 | + 1 Lap | 8 | 3 |
| 5 | 5 | (United Kingdom) Nigel Mansell | Williams-Honda | 58 | Out of fuel | 7 | 2 |
| 6 | 28 | (Sweden) Stefan Johansson | Ferrari | 57 | Out of fuel | 15 | 1 |
| 7 | 12 | (Brazil) Ayrton Senna | Lotus-Renault | 57 | Out of fuel | 1 | |
| 8 | 7 | (Brazil) Nelson Piquet | Brabham-BMW | 57 | Out of fuel | 9 | |
| 9 | 3 | (United Kingdom) Martin Brundle | Tyrrell-Ford | 56 | Out of fuel | 25 | |
| 10 | 16 | (United Kingdom) Derek Warwick | Renault | 56 | + 4 Laps | 14 | |
| DSQ | 2 | (France) Alain Prost | McLaren-TAG | 60 | ~~(1:33:57.118)~~; Underweight | 6 | |
| Ret | 23 | (United States) Eddie Cheever | Alfa Romeo | 50 | Engine | 12 | |
| NC | 24 | (Italy) Piercarlo Ghinzani | Osella-Alfa Romeo | 46 | + 14 Laps | 22 | |
| Ret | 27 | (Italy) Michele Alboreto | Ferrari | 29 | Electrical | 4 | |
| Ret | 9 | (West Germany) Manfred Winkelhock | RAM-Hart | 27 | Engine | 23 | |
| Ret | 10 | (France) Philippe Alliot | RAM-Hart | 24 | Engine | 21 | |
| Ret | 6 | (Finland) Keke Rosberg | Williams-Honda | 23 | Brakes | 2 | |
| Ret | 26 | (France) Jacques Laffite | Ligier-Renault | 22 | Turbo | 16 | |
| Ret | 29 | (Italy) Pierluigi Martini | Minardi-Motori Moderni | 14 | Turbo | 19 | |
| Ret | 25 | (Italy) Andrea de Cesaris | Ligier-Renault | 11 | Spun off | 13 | |
| Ret | 21 | (Italy) Mauro Baldi | Spirit-Hart | 9 | Electrical | 26 | |
| Ret | 8 | (France) François Hesnault | Brabham-BMW | 5 | Engine | 20 | |
| Ret | 4 | (West Germany) Stefan Bellof | Tyrrell-Ford | 5 | Engine | 24 | |
| Ret | 17 | (Austria) Gerhard Berger | Arrows-BMW | 4 | Engine | 10 | |
| Ret | 22 | (Italy) Riccardo Patrese | Alfa Romeo | 4 | Engine | 18 | |
| DNS | 30 | (United Kingdom) Jonathan Palmer | Zakspeed | 0 | Engine | 17 | |

- Boutsen, Mansell, Johannsson, Senna, Piquet and Brundle were classified as they had completed more than 90% of the race distance.
- Alain Prost finished first, but was disqualified as his car was found to be underweight.

== Championship standings after the race ==
Drivers' Championship standings

| Pos | Driver | Points |
|---|---|---|
| 1 | (Italy) Elio de Angelis | 16 |
| 2 | (Italy) Michele Alboreto | 12 |
| 3 | (France) Patrick Tambay | 10 |
| 4 | (Brazil) Ayrton Senna | 9 |
| 5 | (France) Alain Prost | 9 |

Constructors' Championship standings

| Pos | Constructor | Points |
|---|---|---|
| 1 | (United Kingdom) Lotus-Renault | 25 |
| 2 | (Italy) Ferrari | 16 |
| 3 | (United Kingdom) McLaren-TAG | 12 |
| 4 | (France) Renault | 10 |
| 5 | (United Kingdom) Arrows-BMW | 6 |

- Note: Only the top five positions are included for both sets of standings.

| Previous race: 1985 Portuguese Grand Prix | FIA Formula One World Championship; 1985 season | Next race: 1985 Monaco Grand Prix |
| Previous race: 1984 San Marino Grand Prix | San Marino Grand Prix | Next race: 1986 San Marino Grand Prix |
