= Barclay (cigarette) =

Former American cigarette brand

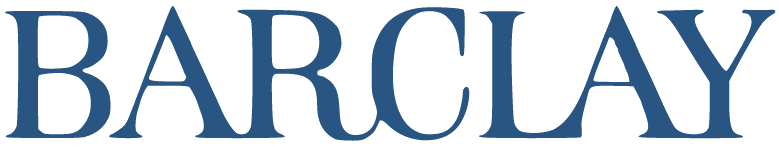
- Product type: Cigarette
- Current owner: British American Tobacco
- Produced by: R.J. Reynolds (US); BAT (outside US)
- Country: United States
- Introduced: 1966; 60 years ago
- Discontinued: 2006; 20 years ago
- Related brands: Kent
- Markets: See Markets
- Previous owners: Brown & Williamson
- Tagline: "The pleasure is back"

Barclay was an American brand of cigarettes manufactured by R. J. Reynolds Tobacco Company in the United States and by British American Tobacco outside of the United States.

First introduced in 1966, the brand was discontinued in 2006.

== Advertising ==
Brown & Williamson made various magazine and print adverts to promote the Barclay brand since its launch in 1980. The ads showed a man in a tuxedo suit with a Barclay cigarette in his mouth with the slogan "The pleasure is back" underneath. The slogan "99% tar free" was also present, but eventually had to be removed as the FTC determined it to be inaccurate. This was because when the cigarette was smoked by a person the result was different from the FTC's testing equipment.

== Sponsorship ==
=== Formula 1 ===
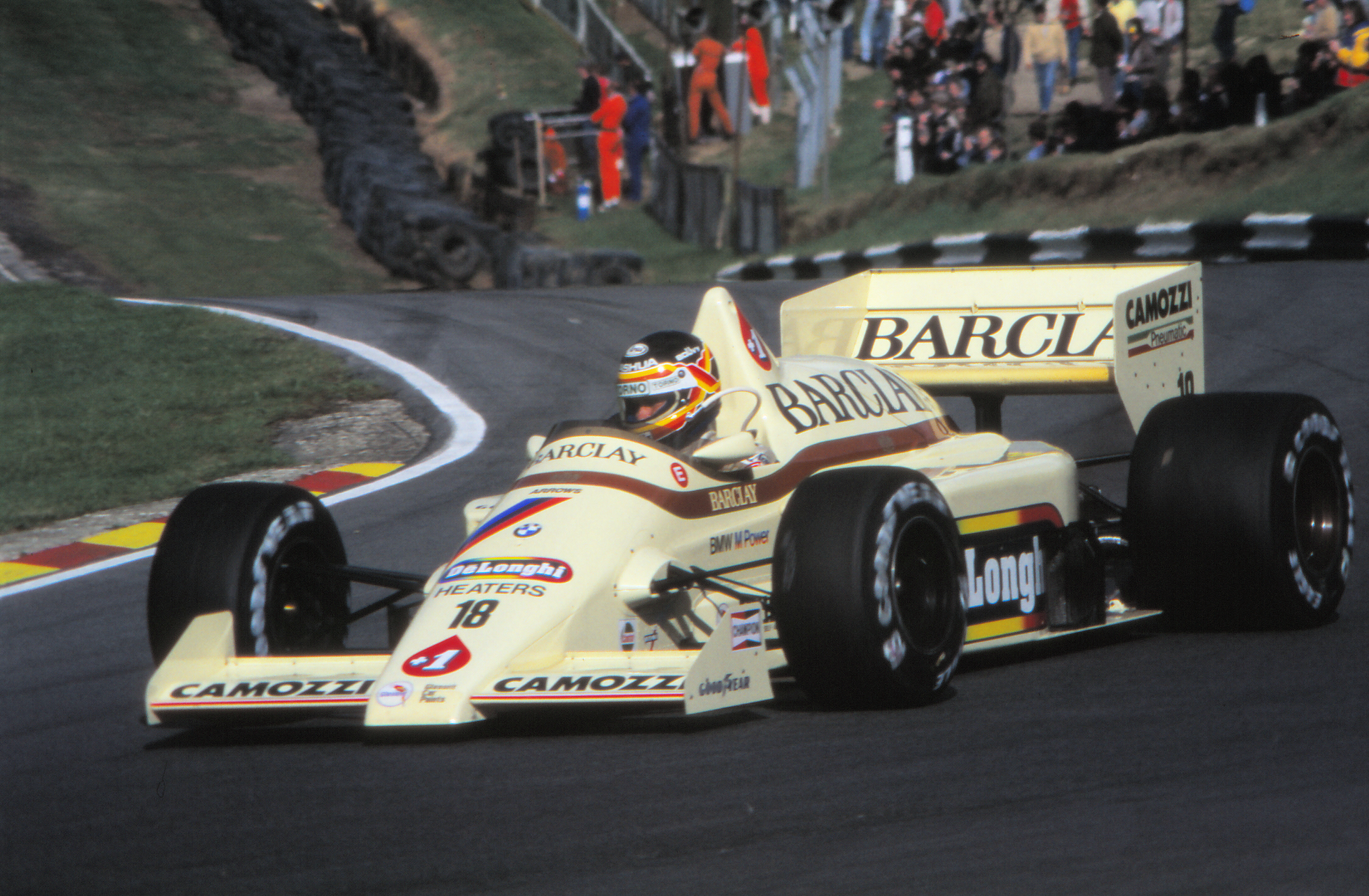
Thierry Boutsen during practice for the 1985 European Grand Prix. Notice the prominent Barclay livery on the car.

Barclay sponsored various Formula 1 teams in the 1980s and 1990s.

Barclay sponsored the Arrows F1 team from 1983 to 1986. The brand was displayed on the front wing, sides, rear wing and on the drivers' helmets. In countries where tobacco sponsorship was forbidden, the logos were removed from the car.

Barclay sponsored the Jordan Grand Prix team in 1992 and 1993. The brand was displayed on the sides and on the drivers' helmets. In countries where tobacco sponsorship was forbidden, the logos were replaced with the Barclay emblem, as well as a red-white line.

Barclay sponsored the Williams F1 team from 1987 up to 1990. The brand was displayed on the sides, the side of the rear wing and on the drivers' helmets. In countries where tobacco sponsorship was forbidden, the logos were replaced with the Barclay emblem, as well as a red-white line.

=== Formula 3000 ===
Barclay sponsored Team Barclay EJR in the 1991 International Formula 3000 Championship.

=== 24 Hours of Le Mans ===
Barclay sponsored car #93 of Graff Racing Rondeau M379 on Le Mans 24 Hours in 1984 and car #10 of Kremer Racing Porsche 956B in 1985.

== Markets ==
Barclay cigarettes were sold in the following countries: United States, Martinique, Chile, Norway, Sweden, Finland, Luxembourg, Belgium, Netherlands, Germany, France, Switzerland, Iceland, Italy, Estonia, Latvia, Rhodesia, South Africa, Lithuania and Russia.

== See also ==
- Tobacco smoking
