= Riccardo Patrese =

Italian racing driver (born 1954)

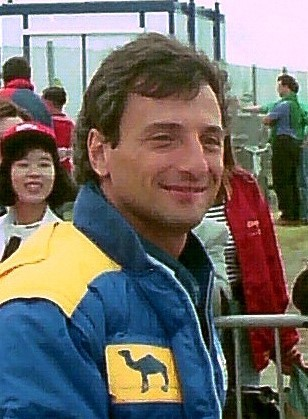
- Patrese at the 1993 British Grand Prix
- Born: Riccardo Gabriele Patrese; 17 April 1954 (age 72); Padua, Veneto, Italy
- Spouses: Susanna (m. 1975; div. 1995) Francesca Accordi (m. 2001)
- Children: 5, including Lorenzo

Formula One World Championship career
- Nationality: (Italy) Italian
- Active years: 1977–1993
- Team(s): Shadow, Arrows, Brabham, Alfa Romeo, Williams, Benetton
- Entries: 257 (256 starts)
- Championships: 0
- Wins: 6
- Podiums: 37
- Career points: 281
- Pole positions: 8
- Fastest laps: 13
- First entry: 1977 Monaco Grand Prix
- First win: 1982 Monaco Grand Prix
- Last win: 1992 Japanese Grand Prix
- Last entry: 1993 Australian Grand Prix

Riccardo Gabriele Patrese (born 17 April 1954) is an Italian former racing driver, who competed in Formula One from 1977 to 1993. Patrese was runner-up in the Formula One World Drivers' Championship in 1992 with Williams, and won six Grands Prix across 17 seasons.

Patrese became the first Formula One driver to achieve 200 Grand Prix starts when he appeared at the 1990 British Grand Prix, and then became the first to achieve 250 starts at the 1993 German Grand Prix. For 19 years, he held the record for the most Formula One Grand Prix starts, with 256 races from 257 entries. At the age of 38 he was runner-up to Nigel Mansell in the 1992 Formula One World Championship, and third in 1989 and 1991. He won six Grands Prix, including the 1982 Monaco Grand Prix, with a record gap of over six years between two of these – the 1983 South African Grand Prix and 1990 San Marino Grand Prix.

Patrese also competed at the World Sportscar Championship for the Lancia factory team, finishing runner-up in 1982 and collecting eight wins.

== Early life and career ==
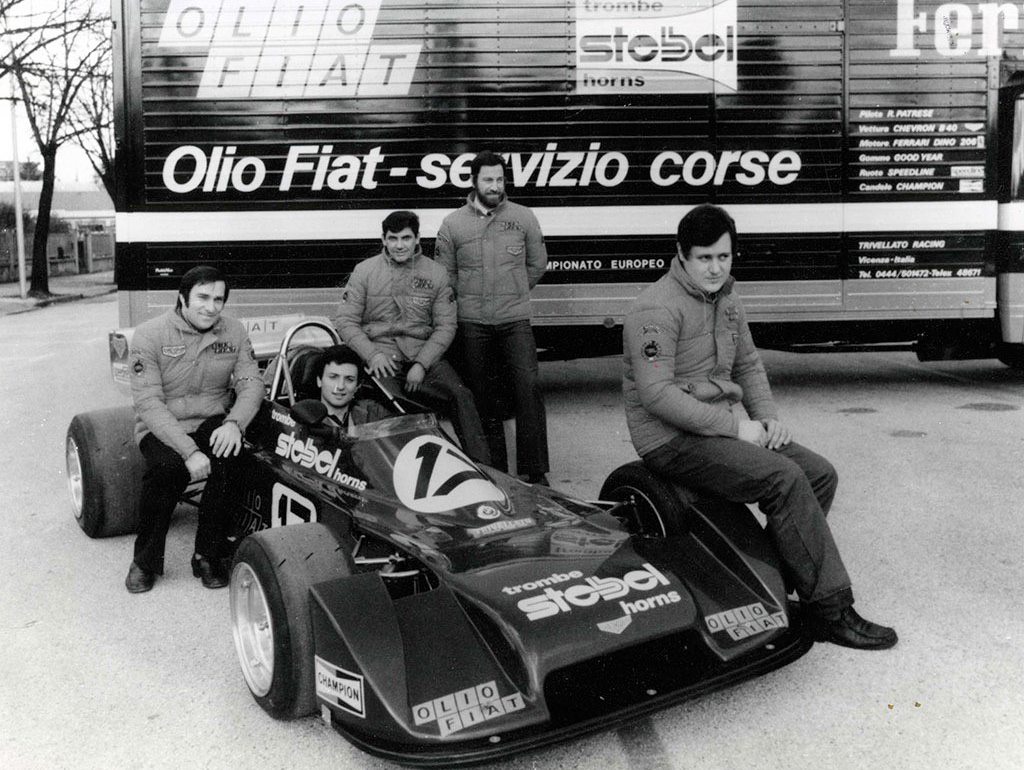
Patrese seated in a Trivellato Racing Team 1977 Chevron B40 Formula 2 car

Riccardo Gabriele Patrese was born on 17 April 1954 in Padua, Veneto. Patrese started kart racing aged nine. Growing up near the Italian Alps, he was also selected for the Italian national ski team as a teenager, and was in addition a competitive swimmer. In 1974, he won the Karting World Championship at the Estoril circuit, finishing ahead of second-placed teammate and fellow future F1 driver Eddie Cheever. He received an offer to drive in Formula Italia the following year, finishing second in the championship to another future F1 racer, Bruno Giacomelli. In 1976, he moved up to Formula 3, winning both the Italian and European Formula 3 championships. The following year, he moved to Formula 2, winning the Italian Championship, before making his Formula One debut midway through the year.

== Formula One career ==
=== Shadow and Arrows ===
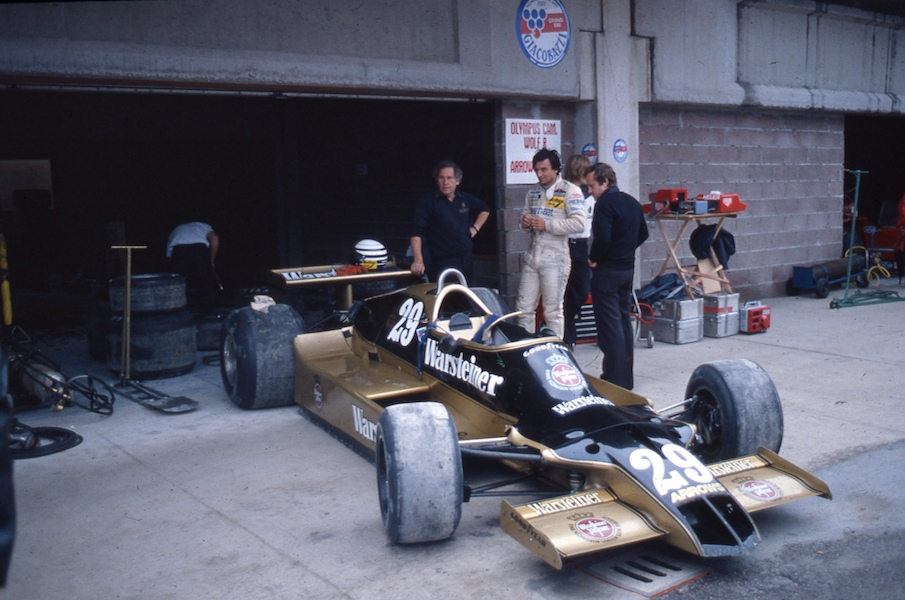
Patrese in the Arrows A1 at the 1979 Dino Ferrari Grand Prix

Patrese made his debut at the 1977 Monaco Grand Prix with the Shadow racing team sponsored by Italian businessman Franco Ambrosio, replacing Renzo Zorzi. He took his first point at the Japanese Grand Prix later that year. Later that year team-leader Jackie Oliver and sponsor Ambrosio left Shadow to form the Arrows team. Patrese and Shadow teammate Alan Jones both received offers from the Williams team for 1978: whilst Jones joined Williams, Patrese linked up with Arrows, alongside Rolf Stommelen. Shadow subsequently took Arrows to court, arguing that Arrows had stolen the design of the Shadow DN9 and that Arrows were essentially running a DN9 under a different name. The court agreed, forcing Arrows to design and construct a totally new car, the Arrows A1, which became the first of the Arrows F1 bloodline.

In 1978, Patrese very nearly won Arrows' second race, the South African Grand Prix, until engine failure forced him to retire 15 laps from the end. He subsequently took second at the Swedish Grand Prix behind Niki Lauda's Brabham BT46B "fan car", in its only appearance before being withdrawn. However, his driving style was perceived by some established drivers, such as Ronnie Peterson and James Hunt, as being over-aggressive. Later that year, at the Italian Grand Prix, Patrese's reputation for aggressive driving was blamed for a first lap major incident. In part, one of the causes suggested was a premature start by the Monza race director, leading to cars at the rear of the field catching up to those in the midfield that had been fully stopped when the green signal was given. This being said, Patrese, Peterson, and 8 others were involved in a ten-car pile-up before turn one, causing a stoppage of the race. Peterson, whose injuries from the chain reaction wreck were not in and of themselves life-threatening, died from an embolism the day after the Grand Prix.

By the next race, the United States Grand Prix, five top drivers - Hunt, Lauda, Mario Andretti, Emerson Fittipaldi and Jody Scheckter - declared that unless Patrese was banned from the race that they would withdraw. The race organizers agreed to this: although Patrese later stated that he obtained a ruling from a local judge in Watkins Glen stating that the ban was a violation of his right to work, Arrows decided to withdraw his entry due to pressure from the organizers and the FIA. He returned to competition at the following race, the Canadian Grand Prix, where he finished fourth.

Patrese's Arrows A3 used during the 1981 season, which was also his last with Arrows

For years after the crash which caused Peterson's death, Hunt (along with other drivers) blamed Patrese for starting the accident, and viewers of Hunt's commentaries of Formula One races from 1980 to 1993 on BBC Television were regularly treated to bitter diatribes against Patrese when the Italian appeared on screen. Hunt, who never forgave the Italian for Peterson's death, believed that it was Patrese's muscling past that caused the McLaren driven by Hunt and the Lotus driven by Peterson to touch, but Patrese argued that he was already well ahead of the pair before the accident took place. Patrese, together with race director Gianni Restilli, stood trial in Italian criminal court on manslaughter charges for Peterson's death. Both were cleared of wrongdoing on 28 October 1981.

Two of Patrese's most notable performances during his Arrows years were at the United States Grand Prix West in Long Beach, where he finished second in 1980 and took pole position in the following year: he led the latter race before being forced to retire by a blocked fuel filter.

=== Brabham ===
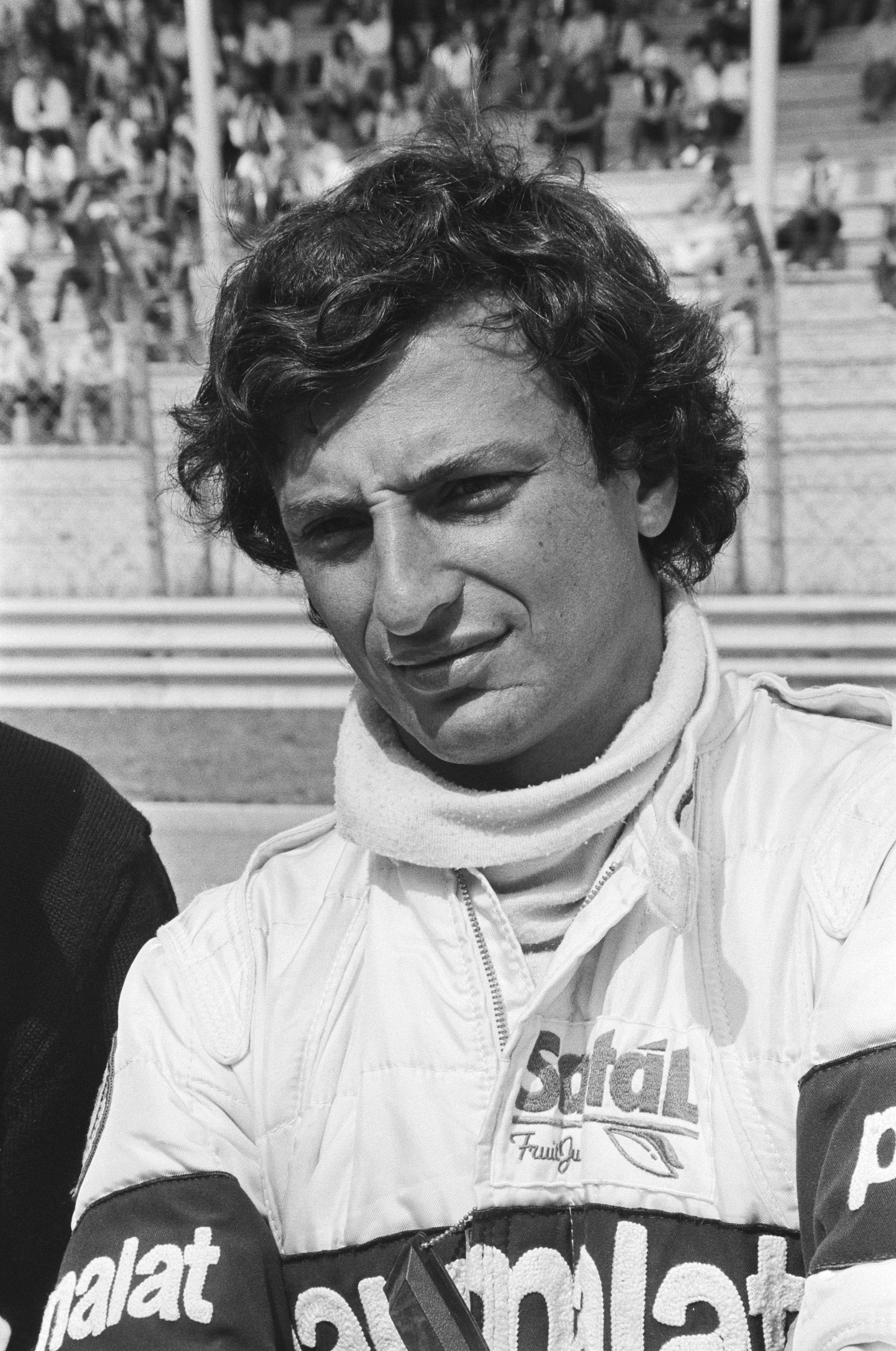
Patrese at the 1982 Dutch Grand Prix

In 1982, Patrese moved to Brabham and gained his maiden win at that year's Monaco Grand Prix in rather sensational circumstances. Patrese took the lead when Alain Prost crashed out, only to spin in dampening conditions on the next lap. This left him third behind Didier Pironi and Andrea de Cesaris, who both stopped on the final lap – Pironi with an electrical fault and de Cesaris out of fuel. Later that season he also led the Austrian Grand Prix but retired due to an engine failure. Patrese finished the season tenth, just ahead of his teammate Nelson Piquet. 1983 proved to be a more difficult season. Patrese crashed out late in the race while leading at San Marino - to the cheers of the tifosi, as his shunt meant that he handed the race win to Ferrari driver Patrick Tambay. He also took pole on home ground at the Italian Grand Prix, before his engine blew up in the early stages of the race: in a 2010 interview he said he suspected that his engine had been left in its qualifying trim, rendering it extremely powerful but fragile, as he had not been offered a new contract for the following year, and had been reluctant to sacrifice his chances of winning his home Grand Prix for teammate Nelson Piquet, who was fighting for the World Championship. Despite scoring a second win at the South African Grand Prix, Patrese only finished ninth while Piquet claimed his second Drivers' Championship title. It would be seven years before he made another visit to the top step of the podium.

=== Alfa Romeo ===
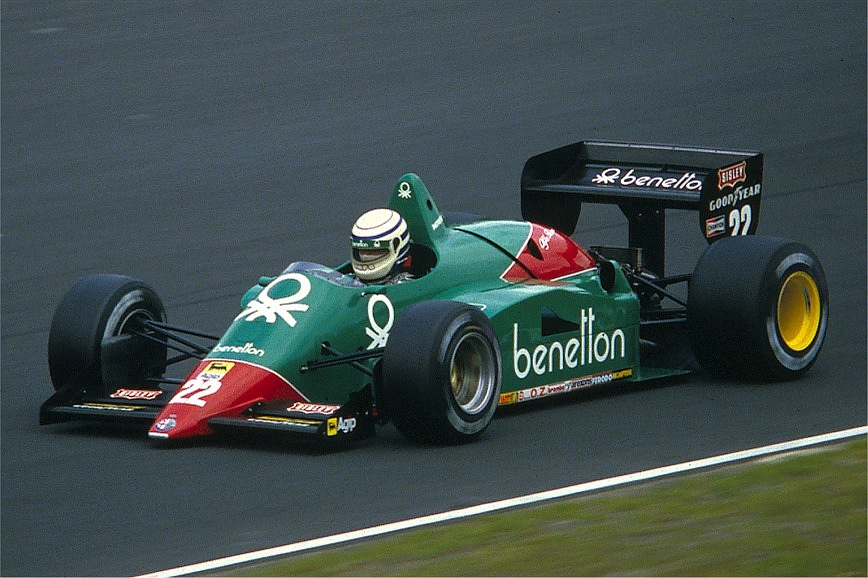
Patrese driving for Alfa Romeo in 1985

A move to Alfa Romeo in 1984 delivered two lacklustre seasons resulting in eight world championship points and a single visit to the podium at the 1984 Italian Grand Prix. Patrese and teammate, American Eddie Cheever, were hampered by cars with Alfa Romeo 890T V8 turbo engines that proved too thirsty for the amount of fuel they were allowed to carry (220 litres). Often both drivers drove good races to be in the points, only to run out of fuel two or three laps from the finish, dropping them out of the points. Indeed, Patrese's third place at Monza in 1984 (to date the final podium finish for Alfa Romeo in F1) came at the expense of Cheever, who was robbed of a podium finish when his car ran out of fuel six laps from the finish.

The pair were also hampered by their cars. 1984's Alfa Romeo 184T proved fast in qualifying, but fuel restrictions saw them well off the pace in most races. The 1985 car, the 185T proved to be even less competitive to the point that halfway through the season the team replaced it with an updated version of the 184T (dubbed the 184TB). Although the updated car did prove faster, results were not forthcoming. In an interview in 2000, Patrese described the 185T as "the worst car I ever drove".

At the 1985 Monaco Grand Prix, Patrese's former teammate Nelson Piquet began his 14th lap and was attempting to lap Patrese as they crossed the start/finish line. The cars made contact, and Patrese went into a spin while Piquet lost his suspension. Patrese then bounced off the wall and back into Piquet, and both drivers were out of the race.

=== Return to Brabham ===
In 1986, Patrese returned to Brabham alongside fellow Italian Elio de Angelis, but by now the team was a spent force and would never again take a driver to victory in a grand prix. Two more winless seasons followed despite the team's BMW engine being considered at the time to be the most powerful on the grid. Despite the trials of uncompetitive machinery, Patrese never publicly criticised the team and earned respect throughout the sport for his professionalism.

=== Williams ===
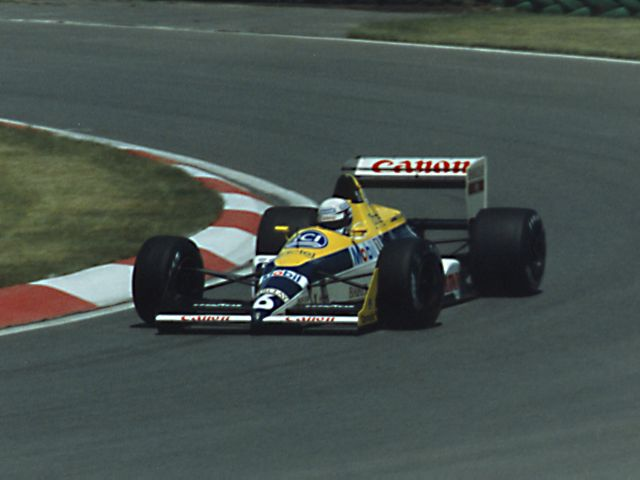
Patrese driving for Williams at the 1988 Canadian Grand Prix

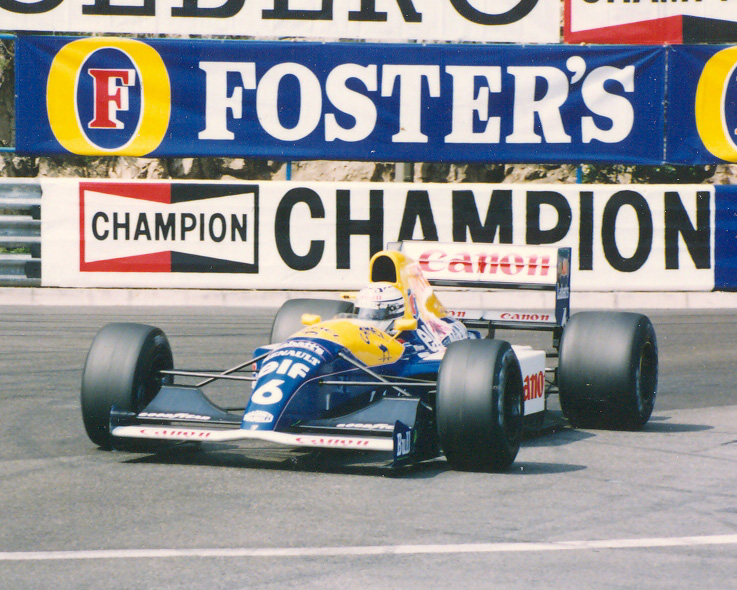
Patrese driving for Williams at the 1991 Monaco Grand Prix

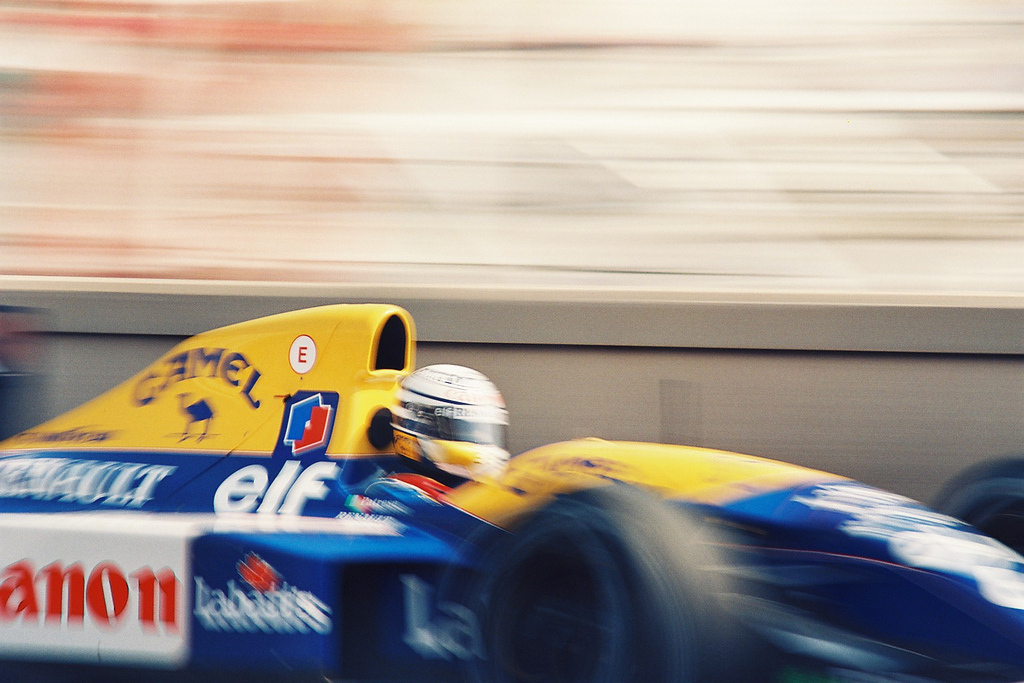
Patrese in the Williams FW14B at the Monaco Grand Prix

Toward the end of the 1987 season, Patrese was given the chance to revitalise what seemed to be a declining career when the Williams driver Nigel Mansell was injured whilst qualifying for the Japanese Grand Prix. With the help of Brabham owner and Formula One boss Bernie Ecclestone, Patrese tested the Williams FW11B at Imola, where he set a time that was half a second quicker than Ayrton Senna's pole at that year's San Marino Grand Prix, and was drafted in to replace Mansell for the season's finale in Australia.

Patrese had already been signed by Williams management to be Nelson Piquet's replacement for the 1988 season as the 1987 and triple World Champion was off to Lotus to replace Ayrton Senna who had signed with McLaren (Honda were staying with Lotus for 1988 but Williams had lost their Honda engines to McLaren). However, 1988 saw Williams struggling with an uncompetitive car powered by non-turbocharged Judd V8 engines. Patrese and Mansell were also hampered in the first half of the season by the Williams FW12's reactive suspension not working properly. It wasn't until the British Grand Prix at Silverstone that Williams dumped the reactive suspension for a more conventional one and the FW12s became competitive.

At the 1988 Spanish Grand Prix, Patrese was fined US$10,000 for 'brake testing' the Tyrrell of F1 rookie Julian Bailey during qualifying which caused the Tyrrell 017 to launch its front wheels in the air when Bailey ran into the back of the Williams. One unnamed driver allegedly said of the incident "They should fine him his bloody retainer. There are enough accidental shunts in this business without someone deliberately causing one".

It was not until 1989 and the arrival of the V10 Renault engines that Patrese and his new teammate Thierry Boutsen were able to challenge for race wins. In his record-breaking 176th Grands Prix, Patrese led the first race of the year in Brazil (the first time he led a Grand Prix since 1983) including setting a new lap record of the Autódromo Internacional Nelson Piquet before stopping with an engine failure. In what would prove to be his best season since 1983, he achieved an impressive third place in the Drivers' Championship, taking no wins but securing six podium finishes, including four second places, as well as claiming pole position in Hungary, a race he confidently led under constant pressure from reigning World Champion Ayrton Senna in his McLaren MP4/5 until lap 54 when a holed radiator forced his retirement.

In 1990, Patrese finally won his third Grand Prix at the 1990 San Marino Grand Prix, though the competitiveness of the Renault powered FW13B with what many felt were two "number two" drivers waned in the second half of the year as McLaren, Ferrari and later Benetton with their Ford V8 engines took the ascendancy and he finished the 1990 Drivers' Championship in 7th place.

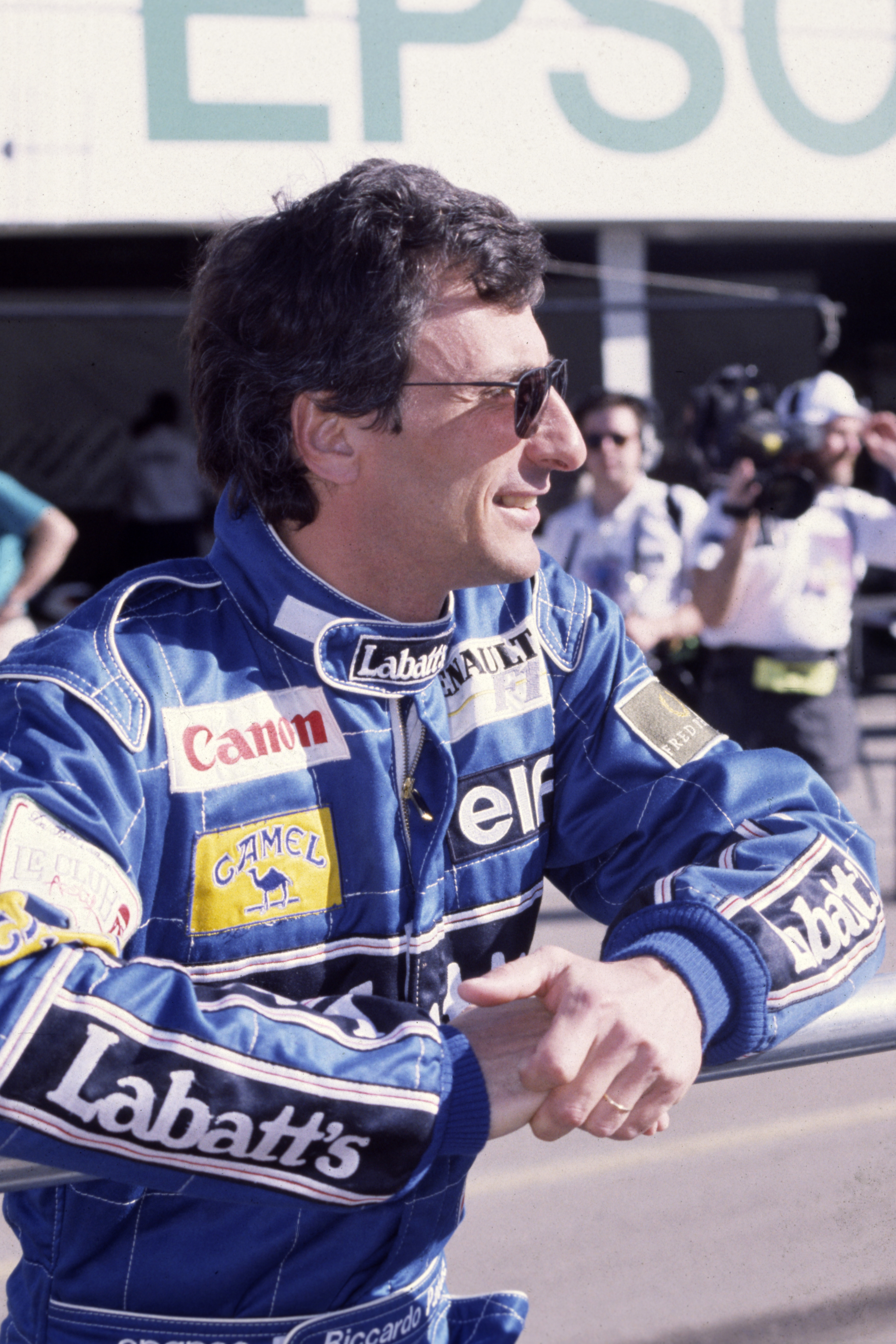
Patrese at the 1991 United States Grand Prix

In 1991, Nigel Mansell returned to Williams after two seasons with Ferrari and, together with Patrese, the team became contenders for both the Drivers' and Constructors' Championships. Two wins in Mexico and Portugal gave Patrese his most competitive F1 season thus far and a respectable third place behind Championship contenders Mansell and Senna. In addition, he took four pole positions across the season. Patrese also out qualified Mansell at every race until the halfway point of the season at Silverstone for the British Grand Prix, and provided much support for the Englishman's title chase at races such as Italy and Portugal.

Williams dominated F1 in 1992 and Patrese continued to deliver in his role of second driver to Nigel Mansell, moving out of the way for Mansell while leading comfortably at that year's French Grand Prix. Again Patrese handled the delicate situation about team orders diplomatically, repeatedly offering a "No comment" to questions about the team orders that had been imposed on him at the red flag period of the French race. Patrese took a single win at the Japanese Grand Prix and had eight other podium finishes, including six second-place results. After his retirement, Patrese stated that Mansell had the edge over him that season because of Mansell's greater upper body strength, as the car's steering was heavy due to the amount of downforce it generated combined with the absence of power steering, whilst Patrese's skill in low speed corners was negated by the car's traction control system.

With Alain Prost, Ayrton Senna and Nigel Mansell all desperately trying to sign for Williams, Patrese's position looked to be under threat and he signed for the Benetton team before the end of the year. His teammate for 1993 would be young German driver Michael Schumacher. Ironically, only Prost was able to agree terms with Williams for 1993 (Mansell went on to race in the American-based Champ Car series while Prost had a clause in his contract, signed in early 1992, that prevented Senna from being his teammate). This would have left a seat free for Patrese had he remained with the team. Although Williams offered Patrese the opportunity to stay with the team after Mansell announced his retirement from F1 at the Italian Grand Prix, he felt he could not go back on his word to Benetton. The number two seat at Williams went to the team's test driver Damon Hill, the son of the 1962 and 1968 World Champion Graham Hill.

=== Benetton ===
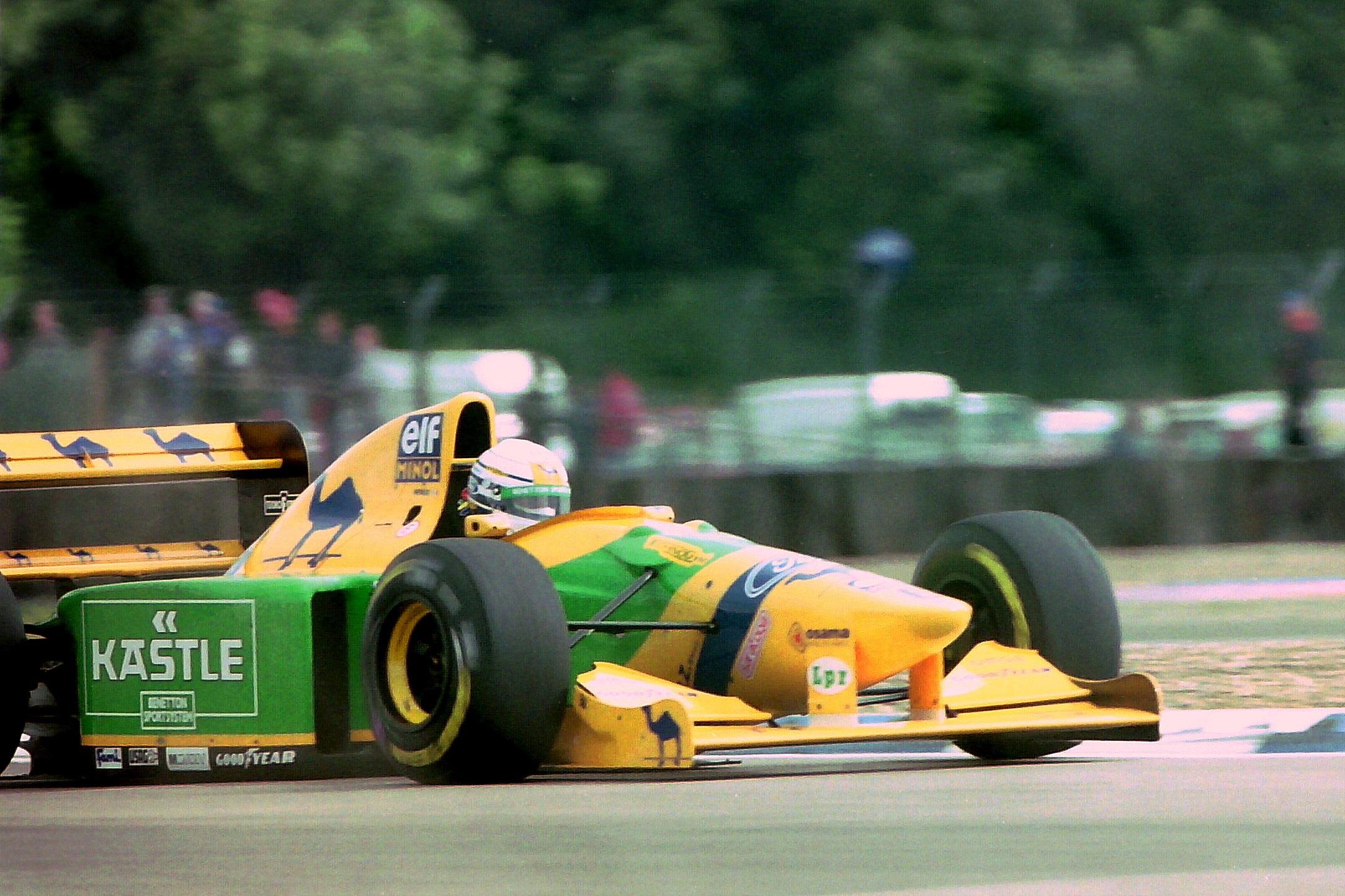
Patrese driving the Benetton B193B during practice for the 1993 British Grand Prix

While Williams continued to dominate F1 in 1993, Patrese found it difficult to get along with team manager Flavio Briatore, sensing that the team's concentration was on his new teammate Michael Schumacher. Patrese would also describe the Benetton B193 with its Ford HBA8 V8 as a step down in quality compared to the much more sophisticated Williams cars he had been driving for the previous five years. After scoring 56 points and finishing second in the World Championship in 1992, Patrese scored 20 points to finish fifth in 1993 with a best finish of second in Hungary in what was to prove to be his final season in Formula One. Before the end of the season, Briatore informed Patrese that he was "free to seek an alternate drive". Ligier made Patrese an offer for 1994 but seeing it as a further step down in his career, he decided against it.

=== Retirement ===
As most top teams already had drivers signed for 1994, Patrese opted for retirement and brought what was then the longest F1 career in history to a conclusion. Patrese was invited to rejoin Williams in 1994 to fill the seat of Ayrton Senna after his fatal accident at Imola, but ultimately decided against returning to Formula One. A DTM test with Mercedes-Benz in July 1994 did not come to fruition either. In the second half of 1996, as thanks for his years of service to Williams, the team invited Patrese to test their latest car, the FW18, at Silverstone, with the Italian reportedly setting a time that would have placed him on the second row of the grid for that year's British Grand Prix.

After this, Patrese competed in the 24 Hours of Le Mans in 1997. He drove a Nissan R390 GT1 for the Nissan factory team; the car was third fastest in qualifying but was forced to retire with gearbox problems. After retiring from racing, he took up show jumping, following in the footsteps of his daughters who have competed in the sport internationally. He won an Italian national amateur title before retiring from equestrianism in 2014. Outside of competition, he is a keen collector of model railways, in particular those manufactured by Märklin.

In 2005, Patrese returned to racing in the inaugural season of the Grand Prix Masters formula for retired F1 drivers. He finished third behind his former teammate Nigel Mansell and Emerson Fittipaldi in the sole 2005 race at Kyalami, South Africa. His 2006 season was less successful with a tenth-place finish at Losail in Qatar and a sixth at Silverstone.

Patrese's record of 257 Grand Prix entries, set in a period when a typical F1 season was limited to 16 races, stood for 15 years, surviving the Schumacher era when Michael Schumacher retired on 250 race entries. Rubens Barrichello finally surpassed Patrese's total, recording his 258th Grand Prix entry at the 2008 Turkish Grand Prix. As part of the "handover", Patrese tested a Honda RA107 at Jerez on 9 September (Barrichello was driving for Honda at the time). Schumacher subsequently came out of retirement and became the second driver to surpass Patrese's former record.

In July 2018, it was announced that Patrese would come out of retirement to compete at the Spa 24 Hours that month, competing in the pro-am category in a JAS Motorsport-run Honda NSX GT3 with Loïc Depailler (the son of former F1 driver Patrick Depailler), Bertrand Baguette and Esteban Guerrieri.

Patrese's son Lorenzo also became a racing driver alongside being a horse rider. He started single-seater racing in the 2020 Italian F4 Championship.

== Racing record ==
=== Career summary ===
Season	Series	Team	Races	Wins	Poles	F/Laps	Podiums	Points	Position
1976	FIA European Formula 3 Championship	Trivellato Racing Team	9	4	1	2	8	52	**1st**
1976	Italian Formula Three Championship	Trivellato Racing Team	8	3	2	0	6	42	**1st**
1977	European Formula Two	Trivellato Racing Team	13	0	2	2	5	32	4th
1977	Formula One	Ambrosio-Tabatip Shadow Racing Team	9	0	0	0	0	1	20th
1978	European Formula Two	Chevron Cars	1	0	0	0	0	0	NC
1978	Formula One	Arrows Racing Team Warsteiner Arrows Racing Team	14	0	0	0	1	11	12th
1979	Formula One	Warsteiner Arrows Racing Team	13	0	0	0	0	2	20th
1979	World Sportscar Championship	ASA Corse	4	0	1	0	1	23	NC
1980	Formula One	Warsteiner Arrows Racing Team Warsteiner Arrows Racing with Penthouse Rizla+.	14	0	0	0	1	7	9th
1980	World Sportscar Championship	Lancia Corse	7	3	0	0	5	N/A	NC
1980	BMW M1 Procar Championship	BMW Motorsport	1	0	0	0	0	2	27th
1981	Formula One	Ragno Arrows Beta Racing Team	15	0	1	0	2	10	11th
1981	World Sportscar Championship	Martini Racing	6	1	0	0	1	32.5	72nd
1981	24 Hours of Le Mans	Martini Racing	1	0	0	0	0	N/A	DNF
1982	Formula One	Parmalat Racing	15	1	0	2	3	21	10th
1982	World Sportscar Championship	Martini Racing	8	2	2	2	5	87	**2nd**
1982	24 Hours of Le Mans	Martini Racing	1	0	0	0	0	N/A	DNF
1983	Formula One	Fila Sport	15	1	1	1	2	13	9th
1983	World Sportscar Championship	Martini Racing	5	0	0	1	1	21	18th
1984	Formula One	Benetton Team Alfa Romeo	16	0	0	0	1	8	13th
1984	World Sportscar Championship	Martini Racing	5	1	2	2 (Note: Between Patrese and Alessandro Nannini, race organisers did not publish which driver set fastest lap.)	1	20	28th
1985	Formula One	Benetton Team Alfa Romeo	16	0	0	0	0	0	NC
1985	World Sportscar Championship	Martini Racing	6	1	5	1	3	34	14th
1986	Formula One	Olivetti Brabham	16	0	0	0	0	2	17th
1987	Formula One	Brabham	15	0	0	0	1	6	13th
1987	Formula One	Canon Williams Honda Team	1	0	0	0	0	6	13th
1988	Formula One	Canon Williams Team	16	0	0	0	0	8	11th
1989	Formula One	Canon Williams Team	16	0	1	1	6	40	**3rd**
1990	Formula One	Canon Williams	16	1	0	4	1	23	7th
1991	Formula One	Canon Williams	16	2	4	2	8	53	**3rd**
1992	Formula One	Canon Williams Renault	16	1	1	3	9	56	**2nd**
1993	Formula One	Camel Benetton Ford	16	0	0	0	2	20	5th
1995	Super Tourenwagen Cup	Ford Mondeo Team Schübel	11	0	0	0	0	5	35th
1997	24 Hours of Le Mans	Nissan Motorsport	1	0	0	0	0	N/A	DNF

=== Complete European Formula 3 results ===
(key) (Races in bold indicate pole position) (Races in italics indicate fastest lap)

Year	Team	Engine	1	2	3	4	5	6	7	8	9	10	Pos.	Pts
1976	Trivellato Racing Team	Toyota	NÜR; 3	**ZAN**; 1	MAN; 2	AVU; 20	PER; 1	MNZ; 1	CET; 3	KAS; 1	KNU; DNQ	VAL; 2	1st	52

=== Complete European Formula Two Championship results ===
(key) (Races in bold indicate pole position; races in italics indicate fastest lap)

Year	Entrant	Chassis	Engine	1	2	3	4	5	6	7	8	9	10	11	12	13	Pos.	Pts
1977	Trivellato Racing Team	Chevron B35	BMW	SIL; 6	THR; 5	HOC; 3	**NÜR**; Ret										4th	32
1977	Trivellato Racing Team	Chevron B40	BMW					VAL; 8	PAU; 3	**MUG**; 2	ROU; 2	NOG; 2	PER; Ret	MIS; Ret	EST; 6		4th	32
1977	Trivellato Racing Team	Chevron B42	BMW													DON; Ret	4th	32
1978	Chevron Cars	Chevron B42	Hart	THR	HOC	NÜR; Ret	PAU	MUG	VAL	ROU	DON	NOG	PER	MIS	HOC		NC	0

=== Complete Formula One World Championship results ===
(key) (Races in bold indicate pole position / Races in italics indicate fastest lap)

Year	Entrant	Chassis	Engine	1	2	3	4	5	6	7	8	9	10	11	12	13	14	15	16	17	WDC	Pts
1977	Ambrosio-Tabatip Shadow Racing Team	Shadow DN8	Ford DFV 3.0 V8	ARG	BRA	RSA	USW	ESP	MON; 9	BEL; Ret	SWE	FRA; Ret	GBR; Ret	GER; 10^{†}	AUT	NED; 13^{†}	ITA; Ret	USA	CAN; 10^{†}	JPN; 6	20th	1
1978	Arrows Racing Team	Arrows FA1	Ford DFV 3.0 V8	ARG	BRA; 10																12th	11
1978	Warsteiner Arrows Racing Team	Arrows FA1	Ford DFV 3.0 V8			RSA; Ret	USW; 6	MON; 6	BEL; Ret	ESP; Ret	SWE; 2	FRA; 8	GBR; Ret	GER; 9							12th	11
1978	Warsteiner Arrows Racing Team	Arrows A1	Ford DFV 3.0 V8												AUT; Ret	NED; Ret	ITA; Ret	USA	CAN; 4		12th	11
1979	Warsteiner Arrows Racing Team	Arrows A1	Ford DFV 3.0 V8	ARG; DNS	BRA; 9	RSA; 11	USW; Ret	ESP; 10	BEL; 5	MON; Ret							CAN; Ret				20th	2
1979	Warsteiner Arrows Racing Team	Arrows A2	Ford DFV 3.0 V8								FRA; 14	GBR; Ret	GER; Ret	AUT; Ret	NED; Ret	ITA; 13		USA; Ret			20th	2
1980	Warsteiner Arrows Racing Team	Arrows A3	Ford DFV 3.0 V8	ARG; Ret	BRA; 6	RSA; Ret		BEL; Ret	MON; 8	FRA; 9	GBR; 9	GER; 9	AUT; 14	NED; Ret	ITA; Ret						9th	7
1980	Warsteiner Arrows Racing with Penthouse Rizla+.	Arrows A3	Ford DFV 3.0 V8				USW; 2									CAN; Ret	USA; Ret				9th	7
1981	Ragno Arrows Beta Racing Team	Arrows A3	Ford DFV 3.0 V8	**USW**; Ret	BRA; 3	ARG; 7	SMR; 2	BEL; Ret	MON; Ret	ESP; Ret	FRA; 14	GBR; 10^{†}	GER; Ret	AUT; Ret	NED; Ret	ITA; Ret	CAN; Ret	CPL; 11			11th	10
1982	Parmalat Racing	Brabham BT50	BMW M12 1.5 L4 t	RSA; Ret				BEL; Ret				NED; 15	GBR; Ret	FRA; Ret	GER; Ret	AUT; Ret	SUI; 5	ITA; Ret	CPL; Ret		10th	21
1982	Parmalat Racing	Brabham BT49D	Ford DFV 3.0 V8		BRA; Ret				MON; 1	DET; Ret	CAN; 2										10th	21
1982	Parmalat Racing	Brabham BT49C	Ford DFV 3.0 V8			USW; 3	SMR														10th	21
1983	Fila Sport	Brabham BT52	BMW M12 1.5 L4 t	BRA; Ret	USW; 10^{†}	FRA; Ret	SMR; Ret	MON; Ret	BEL; Ret	DET; Ret	CAN; Ret										9th	13
1983	Fila Sport	Brabham BT52B	BMW M12 1.5 L4 t									GBR; Ret	GER; 3	AUT; Ret	NED; 9	**ITA**; Ret	EUR; 7	RSA; 1			9th	13
1984	Benetton Team Alfa Romeo	Alfa Romeo 184T	Alfa Romeo 890T 1.5 V8 t	BRA; Ret	RSA; 4	BEL; Ret	SMR; Ret	FRA; Ret	MON; Ret	CAN; Ret	DET; Ret	DAL; Ret	GBR; 12	GER; Ret	AUT; 10^{†}	NED; Ret	ITA; 3	EUR; 6	POR; 8		13th	8
1985	Benetton Team Alfa Romeo	Alfa Romeo 185T	Alfa Romeo 890T 1.5 V8 t	BRA; Ret	POR; Ret	SMR; Ret	MON; Ret	CAN; 10	DET; Ret	FRA; 11	GBR; 9										NC	0
1985	Benetton Team Alfa Romeo	Alfa Romeo 184T	Alfa Romeo 890T 1.5 V8 t									GER; Ret	AUT; Ret	NED; Ret	ITA; Ret	BEL; Ret	EUR; 9	RSA; Ret	AUS; Ret		NC	0
1986	Olivetti Brabham	Brabham BT55	BMW M12 1.5 L4 t	BRA; Ret	ESP; Ret	SMR; 6^{†}	MON; Ret	BEL; 8	CAN; Ret	DET; 6	FRA; Ret		GER; Ret	HUN; Ret	AUT; Ret	ITA; Ret	POR; Ret	MEX; 13^{†}	AUS; Ret		17th	2
1986	Olivetti Brabham	Brabham BT54	BMW M12 1.5 L4 t									GBR; Ret									17th	2
1987	Brabham	Brabham BT56	BMW M12 1.5 L4 t	BRA; Ret	SMR; 9	BEL; Ret	MON; Ret	DET; 9	FRA; Ret	GBR; Ret	GER; Ret	HUN; 5	AUT; Ret	ITA; Ret	POR; Ret	ESP; 13	MEX; 3	JPN; 11			13th	6
1987	Canon Williams Honda	Williams FW11B	Honda RA167E 1.5 V6 t																AUS; 9^{†}		13th	6
1988	Canon Williams Team	Williams FW12	Judd CV 3.5 V8	BRA; Ret	SMR; 13	MON; 6	MEX; Ret	CAN; Ret	DET; Ret	FRA; Ret	GBR; 8	GER; Ret	HUN; 6	BEL; Ret	ITA; 7	POR; Ret	ESP; 5	JPN; 6	AUS; 4		11th	8
1989	Canon Williams Renault	Williams FW12C	Renault RS1 3.5 V10	BRA; Ret	SMR; Ret	MON; 15	MEX; 2	USA; 2	CAN; 2	FRA; 3	GBR; Ret	GER; 4	**HUN**; Ret	BEL; Ret	ITA; 4		ESP; 5				**3rd**	**40**
1989	Canon Williams Renault	Williams FW13	Renault RS1 3.5 V10													POR; Ret		JPN; 2	AUS; 3		**3rd**	**40**
1990	Canon Williams Renault	Williams FW13B	Renault RS2 3.5 V10	USA; 9	BRA; 13^{†}	SMR; 1	MON; Ret	CAN; Ret	MEX; 9	FRA; 6	GBR; Ret	GER; 5	HUN; 4	BEL; Ret	ITA; 5	POR; 7	ESP; 5	JPN; 4	AUS; 6		7th	23
1991	Canon Williams Renault	Williams FW14	Renault RS3 3.5 V10	USA; Ret	BRA; 2	SMR; Ret	MON; Ret	**CAN**; 3	**MEX**; 1	**FRA**; 5	GBR; Ret	GER; 2	HUN; 3	BEL; 5	ITA; Ret	**POR**; 1	ESP; 3	JPN; 3	AUS; 5		**3rd**	**53**
1992	Canon Williams Renault	Williams FW14B	Renault RS3C 3.5 V10	RSA; 2	MEX; 2	BRA; 2	ESP; Ret	SMR; 2	MON; 3	CAN; Ret	FRA; 2	GBR; 2	GER; 8^{†}								**2nd**	**56**
1992	Canon Williams Renault	Williams FW14B	Renault RS4 3.5 V10											**HUN**; Ret	BEL; 3	ITA; 5	POR; Ret	JPN; 1	AUS; Ret		**2nd**	**56**
1993	Camel Benetton Ford	Benetton B193	Ford HBA7 3.5 V8	RSA; Ret	BRA; Ret																5th	20
1993	Camel Benetton Ford	Benetton B193B	Ford HBA7 3.5 V8			EUR; 5	SMR; Ret	ESP; 4	MON; Ret	CAN; Ret	FRA; 10	GBR; 3	GER; 5	HUN; 2	BEL; 6	ITA; 5	POR; 16^{†}	JPN; Ret	AUS; 8^{†}		5th	20

^{†} Driver did not finish the Grand Prix, but was classified as he completed over 90% of the race distance.

=== Complete 24 Hours of Le Mans results ===
Year	Team	Co-Drivers	Car	Class	Laps	Pos.	Class Pos.
1981	(Italy) Martini Racing	(Italy) Piercarlo Ghinzani (Germany) Hans Heyer	Lancia Beta Monte Carlo	Gr.5	186	DNF	DNF
1982	(Italy) Martini Racing	(Italy) Piercarlo Ghinzani (Germany) Hans Heyer	Lancia LC1	Gr.6	152	DNF	DNF
1997	(Japan) Nissan Motorsport (United Kingdom) TWR	(Belgium) Eric van de Poele (Japan) Aguri Suzuki	Nissan R390 GT1	GT1	121	DNF	DNF

=== Complete Super Tourenwagen Cup results ===
(key) (Races in bold indicate pole position) (Races in italics indicate fastest lap)

Year	Team	Car	1	2	3	4	5	6	7	8	9	10	11	12	13	14	15	16	DC	Pts
1995	Ford Mondeo Team Schübel	Ford Mondeo 4x4	ZOL; 1; 18	ZOL; 2 Ret	SPA; 1	SPA; 2	ÖST; 1 Ret	ÖST; 2 DNS	HOC; 1 Ret	HOC; 2 DNS	NÜR; 1; 21	NÜR; 2 Ret	SAL; 1; 24	SAL; 2 Ret	AVU; 1 Ret	AVU; 2 DNS	NÜR; 1; 19	NÜR; 2 Ret	35th	5

=== Complete Grand Prix Masters results ===
(key) Races in bold indicate pole position, races in italics indicate fastest lap.

Year	Team	Chassis	Engine	1	2	3	4	5
2005	Team Goldpfeil	Delta Motorsport GPM	Nicholson McLaren 3.5 V8	RSA; 3				
2006	Team INA	Delta Motorsport GPM	Nicholson McLaren 3.5 V8	QAT; 10	ITA; C	GBR; 6	MAL; C	RSA; C

Sporting positions
Preceded by Larry Perkins	European Formula Three; Champion; 1976	Succeeded by Piercarlo Ghinzani
Preceded by Luciano Pavesi	Italian Formula Three; Champion; 1976	Succeeded by Elio de Angelis
Preceded by Vern Schuppan	Macau Grand Prix; Winner; 1977–1978	Succeeded by Geoff Lees
Records
Preceded by Jacques Laffite; 180 entries, 176 starts (1974 – 1986)	Most Grand Prix entries 257 entries, 256 starts (1977 – 1993), 181st entry at the 1989 Mexican GP; 177th start at the 1989 Brazilian GP	Succeeded by Rubens Barrichello; 326 entries (322 starts), 258th at the 2008 Turkish GP
