= Alfa Romeo 183T =

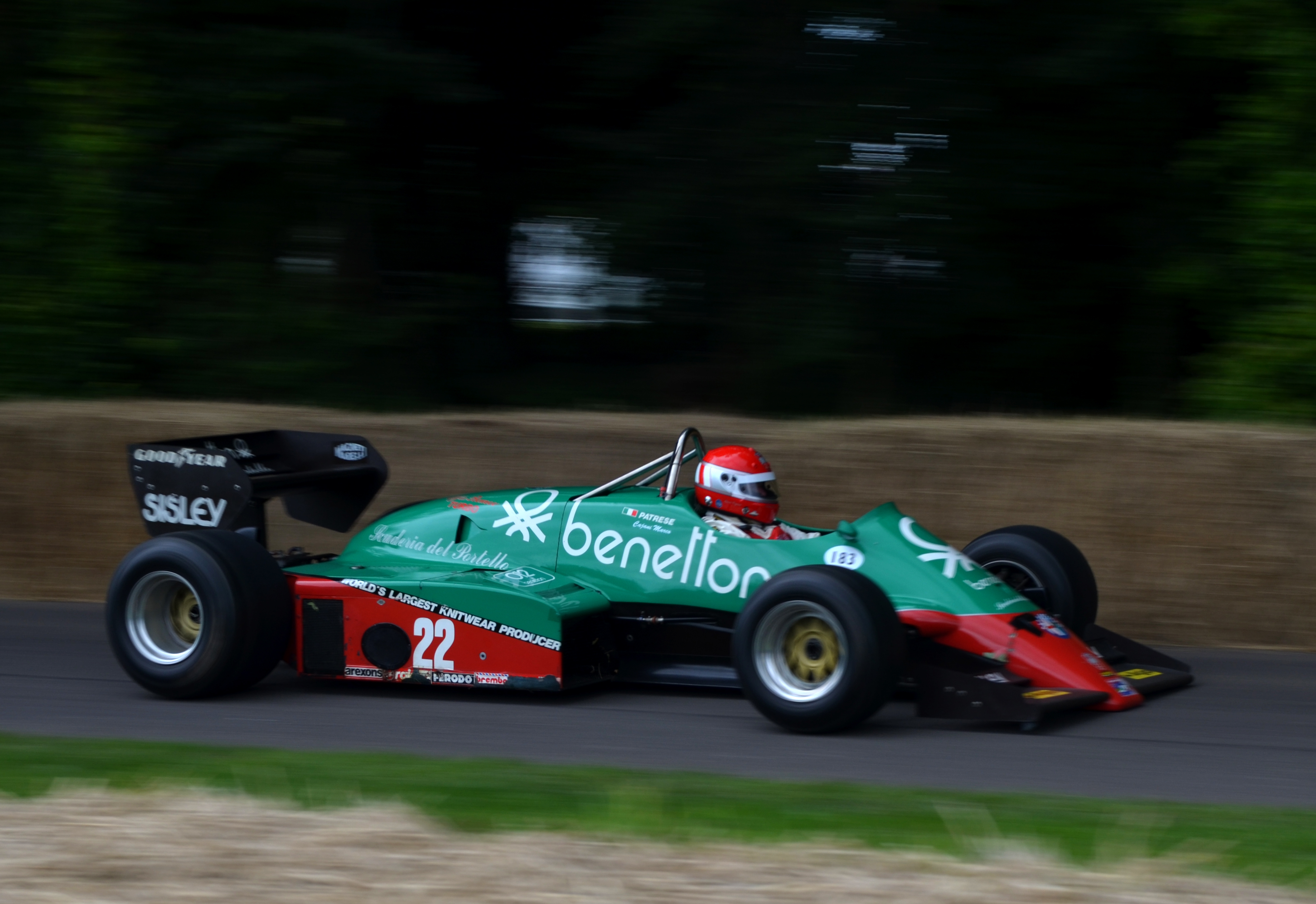
- An Alfa Romeo 183T in early-1984 development specification and livery
- Category: Formula One
- Constructor: Alfa Romeo
- Designers: Gérard Ducarouge (Technical Director); Mario Tollentino (Chief Designer)
- Predecessor: 182B
- Successor: 184T

Technical specifications
- Chassis: Carbon fibre monocoque
- Suspension (front): Coil, wishbone, rocker
- Suspension (rear): Coil, wishbone, rocker
- Wheelbase: 2,720 mm (107.1 in)
- Engine: Alfa Romeo 890T, 1,496 cc (91.3 cu in), 90° V8, turbo, mid-engine, longitudinally mounted
- Transmission: Alfa Romeo / Hewland 5/6-speed Manual
- Weight: 558 kg (1,230.2 lb)
- Fuel: Agip
- Tyres: Michelin

Competition history
- Notable entrants: Marlboro Team Alfa Romeo
- Notable drivers: 22. (Italy) Andrea de Cesaris; 23. (Italy) Mauro Baldi
- Debut: 1983 Brazilian Grand Prix
Races	Wins	Poles	F/Laps
15	0	0	1
- Constructors' Championships: 0
- Drivers' Championships: 0

The Alfa Romeo 183T was a Formula One car designed by Gérard Ducarouge and Mario Tollentino and was used by Marlboro Team Alfa Romeo during the 1983 Formula One season. The car, with a newly designed flat bottom, made its debut at the 1983 Brazilian Grand Prix. Running on Michelin tyres, the 183T was driven in 1983 by Italian drivers Andrea de Cesaris and Mauro Baldi.

== Design and development ==
Unlike the preceding Alfa Romeo F1 cars, the 183T chassis was not designed by Alfa Romeo's Autodelta; instead Euroracing's chief engineer Gérard Ducarouge was the main designer (Ducarouge was fired by Alfa less than a month into the 1983 season and was quickly signed by Lotus). Euroracing had been earlier successful in Formula 3 with Alfa Romeo engines.

The 183T was basically an updated version of the teams 1982 car, the 182. Gone however was Alfa's 1260 V12 which had served the team since 1979. In its place was the 890T, a 1.5-liter turbocharged V8 engine (the 1260 engine was still used at the time by the Osella team). The change in engine gave the 183T a significant boost in power. The 1260 V12 was rated at 540 bhp (400 kW) while the turbocharged 890T was rated at 640 bhp (480 kW). However, this still fell short of the 850 bhp (630 kW) power figures quoted for the turbocharged BMW, Renault and Ferrari engines. During the year the 890T's fuel consumption wasn't a factor as stops for fuel were permitted. From 1984, however, when the FIA imposed a 220-liter fuel limit on the cars and banned stops for fuel, the V8 engine's fuel consumption, plus its shortage of power would see Alfa wane as a Formula One front runner.

== Racing history ==
The 183T took 18 points from 29 entries. Andrea de Cesaris managed to score two second-place finishes and also gained one fastest lap at Spa Francorchamps, a race that he started from the 2nd row and led over half of the distance.

The 183T was used in early season testing before the 1984 season, fitted with new sidepods that would later appear on its successor, the Alfa Romeo 184T. However, the 183T was retired before the start of the season and was not further used in competition.

== Livery ==
The cars were originally run with Marlboro livery as a main sponsor, later the livery was updated with a new sponsorship from an Italian fashion brand Benetton.

== Complete Formula One results ==
(key) (results in italics indicate fastest lap)

Year	Team	Engine	Tyres	Drivers	1	2	3	4	5	6	7	8	9	10	11	12	13	14	15	Points	WCC
1983	Marlboro Team Alfa Romeo	Alfa Romeo 890T; V8 tc	MI		BRA	USW	FRA	SMR	MON	BEL	DET	CAN	GBR	GER	AUT	NED	ITA	EUR	RSA	18	6th
1983	Marlboro Team Alfa Romeo	Alfa Romeo 890T; V8 tc	MI	Andrea de Cesaris	EX	Ret	12	Ret	Ret	Ret	Ret	Ret	8	2	Ret	Ret	Ret	4	2	18	6th
1983	Marlboro Team Alfa Romeo	Alfa Romeo 890T; V8 tc	MI	Mauro Baldi	Ret	Ret	Ret	Ret	6	Ret	12	10	7	Ret	Ret	5	Ret	Ret	Ret	18	6th
