= Alfa Romeo 185T =

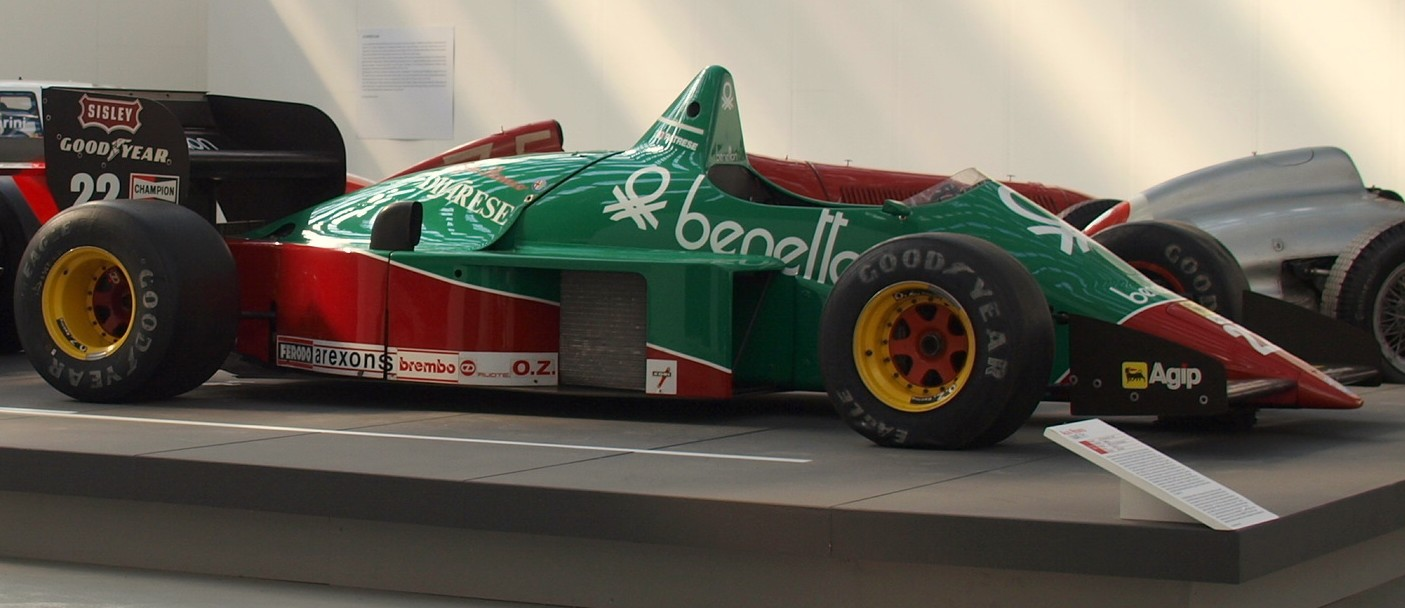
- Category: Formula One
- Constructor: Alfa Romeo
- Designers: Mario Tollentino (Technical Director); John Gentry (Chief Designer)
- Predecessor: 184T
- Successor: C38

Technical specifications
- Chassis: Carbon fibre monocoque
- Suspension (front): Coil, wishbone, pushrod
- Suspension (rear): Coil, wishbone, pushrod
- Axle track: Front: 1,810 mm (71 in); Rear: 1,680 mm (66 in)
- Wheelbase: 2,720 mm (107.1 in)
- Engine: Alfa Romeo 890T, 1,496 cc (91.3 cu in), 90° V8, turbo, mid-engine, longitudinally mounted
- Transmission: Alfa Romeo / Hewland 6-speed manual
- Weight: 550 kg (1,212.5 lb)
- Fuel: Agip
- Tyres: Goodyear

Competition history
- Notable entrants: Benetton Team Alfa Romeo
- Notable drivers: 22. (Italy) Riccardo Patrese; 23. (United States) Eddie Cheever
- Debut: 1985 Brazilian Grand Prix
Races	Wins	Poles	F/Laps
8	0	0	0
- Constructors' Championships: 0
- Drivers' Championships: 0

The Alfa Romeo 185T is a Formula One car that Alfa Romeo used during the 1985 season. The car was entered in 8 races, but without any success and suffering from poor reliability, the team returned to the previous year's car, the 184T, updated to 184TB specification.

This was the last Alfa Romeo Formula One car before their return with Sauber Engineering in 2019.

== Engine ==
The car was powered by Alfa's own 890T, a 1.5 L turbocharged V8 engine which produced around 780 hp (582 kW) at 10,200 rpm.

According to Eddie Cheever in early 1985, the unloved 890T was due to be replaced by an 850 bhp (634 kW; 862 PS), 4 cylinder turbo engine dubbed the Alfa Romeo 415T at some point during the season. However, development on that engine was put on hold when it was decided to withdraw the Alfa Romeo team from Formula One altogether at the end of 1985. The 415T would briefly be revived in a short lived and ill-fated association with the French Ligier team in 1987, but unfavourable comments about the engine by Ligier's lead driver René Arnoux saw parent company Fiat pull the plug on both the engine and the deal with Ligier before it ever got to race in Formula One.

== Racing history ==
Driven by Patrese, the 185T was involved in an accident on lap 16 of the Monaco Grand Prix. Nelson Piquet in his Brabham-BMW was attempting to pass Patrese along the pit straight. Patrese moved across on his former Brabham teammate and put the Brazilian into the guardrail. The incident was captured by the television cameras, both the Brabham and the Alfa Romeo were destroyed, though both drivers were able to walk away injury free.

It was at Monaco where Cheever achieved the best qualifying position for the 185T when he started from fourth on the grid with a time only 0.279 seconds slower than pole winner Ayrton Senna in his Lotus-Renault. Cheever had failed to qualify the 184T at Monaco in 1984. After the qualification, Cheever told reporters "We have a new wing here, which is much better than the old one, and the grip is good. Most of all though, we're understanding more and more about the Bosch Motronic, and throttle response is excellent. I think we can run with just about anyone on power as well. I mean, the car is good all round right now - if it can finish". However, it did not take too long for the American to change his tune about the 185T.

== Reception and shortcomings ==
Patrese later described the 185T as the worst car he had driven. He criticised its chassis and aerodynamics, severe turbo lag and poor reliability. The fuel-thirsty engine also required the car to begin races with a heavy fuel load, while repeated turbocharger failures limited the team's testing and development mileage. In July 1985, the team abandoned the 185T and returned to a modified version of the previous season's 184T chassis.

== Complete Formula One results ==
(key) (results in bold indicate pole position)

Year	Team	Engine	Tyres	Drivers	1	2	3	4	5	6	7	8	9	10	11	12	13	14	15	16	Pts.	WCC
1985	Benetton Team Alfa Romeo	Alfa Romeo 890T; V8 tc	**G**		BRA	POR	SMR	MON	CAN	DET	FRA	GBR	GER	AUT	NED	ITA	BEL	EUR	RSA	AUS	**0**	**12th**
1985	Benetton Team Alfa Romeo	Alfa Romeo 890T; V8 tc	**G**	Riccardo Patrese	Ret	Ret	Ret	Ret	10	Ret	11	9									**0**	**12th**
1985	Benetton Team Alfa Romeo	Alfa Romeo 890T; V8 tc	**G**	Eddie Cheever	Ret	Ret	Ret	Ret	17	9	10										**0**	**12th**
