= Eddie Cheever =

American racing driver (born 1958)

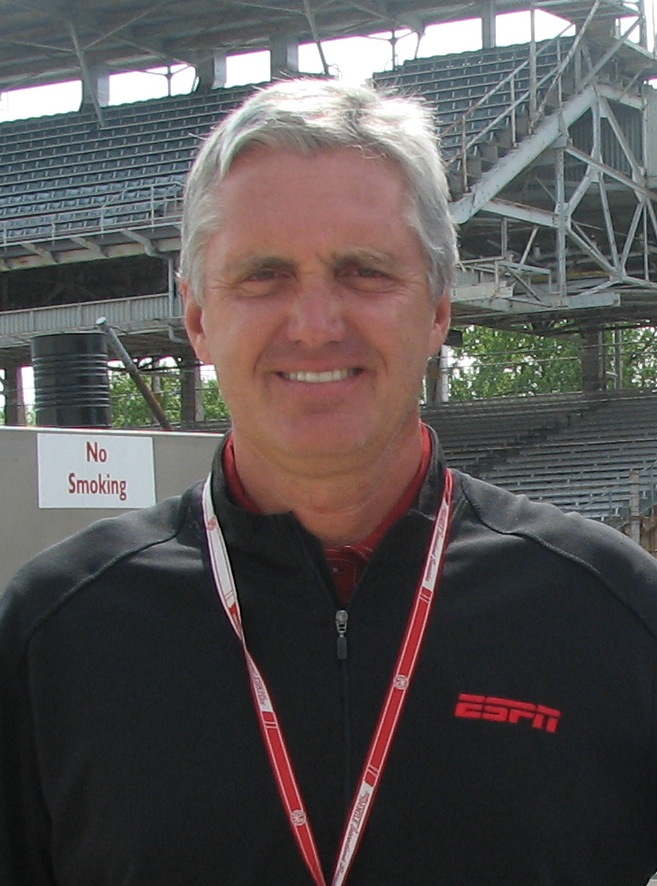
- Cheever at the 2009 Indianapolis 500
- Born: Edward McKay Cheever Jr. January 10, 1958 (age 68); Phoenix, Arizona, U.S.
- Children: 4, including Eddie III
- Relatives: Ross Cheever (brother); Richard Antinucci (nephew)

Formula One World Championship career
- Nationality: (United States) American
- Active years: 1978, 1980–1989
- Team(s): Theodore, Hesketh, Osella, Tyrrell, Ligier, Renault, Alfa Romeo, Haas Lola, Arrows
- Entries: 143 (132 starts)
- Championships: 0
- Wins: 0
- Podiums: 9
- Career points: 70
- Pole positions: 0
- Fastest laps: 0
- First entry: 1978 Argentine Grand Prix
- Last entry: 1989 Australian Grand Prix

24 Hours of Le Mans career
- Years: 1980–1981, 1986–1987
- Teams: Lancia, Martini, Jaguar
- Best finish: 5th (1987)
- Class wins: 0

Edward McKay Cheever Jr. (born January 10, 1958) is an American former racing driver and motorsport executive, who competed in Formula One from 1978 to 1989, CART between 1986 and 1995, (Note: The exact years Cheever competed in CART: 1986, 1990–1995.) and IndyCar between 1996 and 2006. (Note: The exact years Cheever competed in IndyCar: 1996–2002, 2006.) In American open-wheel racing, Cheever won the Indianapolis 500 in 1998 with Team Cheever.

Cheever raced for almost thirty years in Formula One, sports cars, CART, and the Indy Racing League. Cheever participated in 143 Formula One World Championship races and started 132, more than any other American, driving for nine different teams from 1978 through 1989.

In 1996, Cheever formed his own IRL team, Team Cheever, and won the 1998 Indianapolis 500 as both owner and driver. The team later competed in sports cars.

Cheever's younger brother Ross Cheever, nephew Richard Antinucci and son Eddie Cheever III also became racing drivers.

== Early life ==
Though born in Phoenix, Arizona, Cheever lived in Rome, Italy, as a child and attended St. George's British International School and later The New School of Rome. He was introduced to motorsports at age eight when his father took him to a sports car race in Monza. He soon began racing go-karts and won both the Italian and European Karting Championships at the age of fifteen. He worked his way up through the levels of European Formula racing, teaming with fellow American Danny Sullivan in Formula Three in 1975. He scored a significant win against Gunnar Nilsson and Rupert Keegan at the end of 1975 and then driving for Ron Dennis' Project Four team in Formula Two in 1976, 1977, and 1978, finishing runner-up to René Arnoux in the 1977 championship. By the end of 1977, he was considered among the most promising drivers in the world outside F1, scoring wins in 1977 in F2 at Nurburgring and Rouen.

== Formula One ==
Cheever first entered Formula One in 1978, shortly after his twentieth birthday. After failing to qualify for the first two races of the year in Argentina and Brazil in a Theodore, he made the grid in South Africa in a Hesketh, but retired early. He then concentrated on Formula Two for the rest of 1978 and 1979.

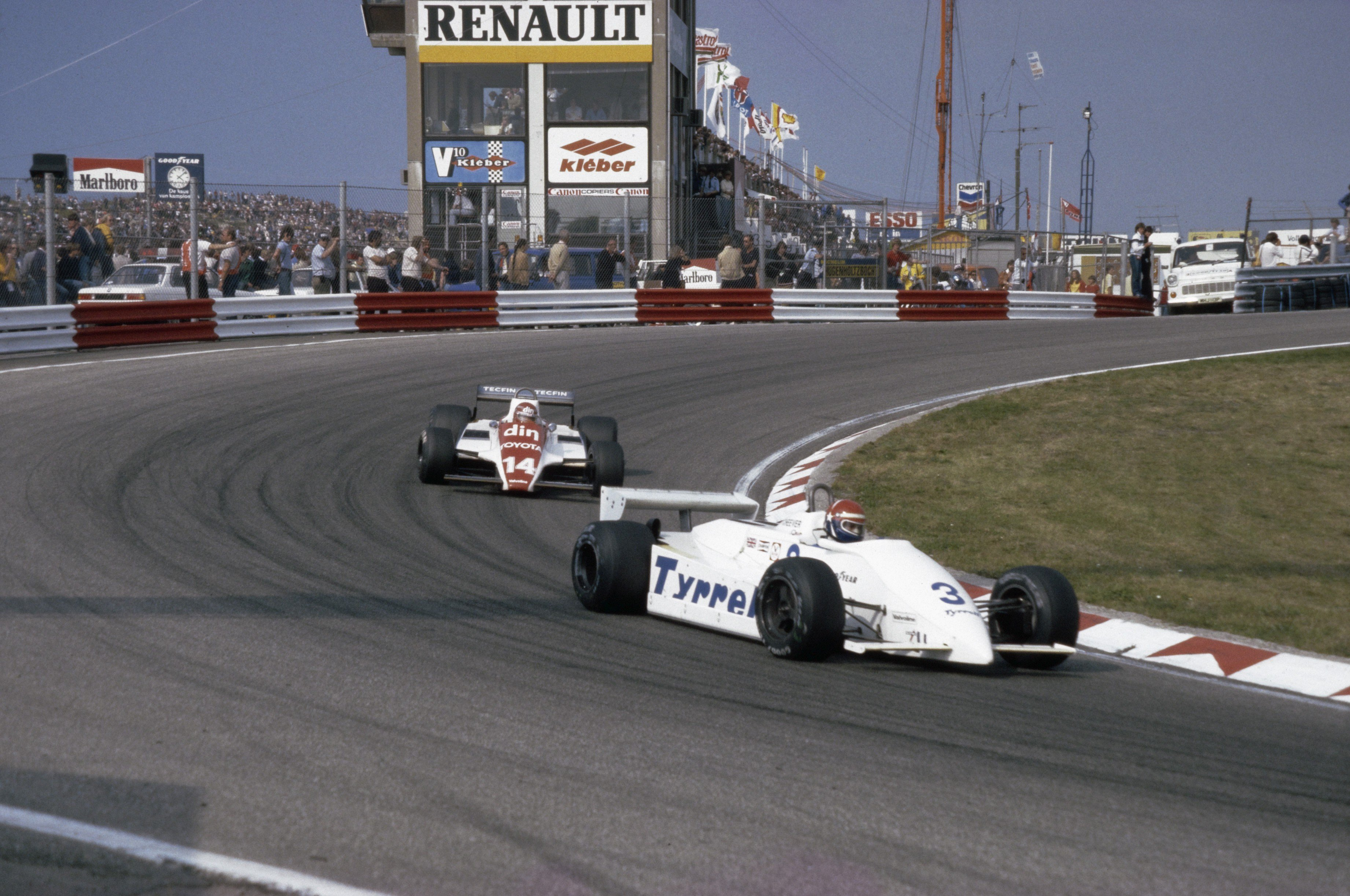
Cheever driving for Tyrrell at the 1981 Dutch Grand Prix

For the 1979 F2 championship, Cheever left Project Four and joined the Italian Osella team, taking three wins and fourth overall in their BMW-powered FA2. In 1980 Osella moved up to Formula One, Cheever piloting the team's Cosworth-powered FA1. However, the car was unreliable and Cheever managed just one finish all year, twelfth place at the team's home race in Italy. Switching teams repeatedly as he tried to climb his way up the grid, Cheever had five points-scoring finishes for the Tyrrell team in 1981, and three podiums for Ligier the following year, including a second-place at the 1982 Detroit Grand Prix.

The 1983 season proved to be Cheever's high point in Formula One. He signed with the factory Equipe Renault team alongside Frenchman Alain Prost, both of whom were among the year's Championship favorites. Cheever earned four more podiums and 22 Championship points driving the Renault RE30C for the first two races before driving its much better replacement, the RE40, for the remainder of the season. But the team's disappointment after losing both the Drivers' (Prost) and Constructors' titles late in the season brought about the replacement of both Cheever and Prost. His best finish for Renault was second in the Canadian Grand Prix at the Circuit Gilles Villeneuve in Montreal, while earlier in the season he achieved his highest career qualifying position when he was second to teammate Prost at the French Grand Prix at the Paul Ricard Circuit. Unconfirmed rumors had Renault signing Cheever as the French manufacturer was looking to sell more cars in North America, and having an American driver in the factory-backed Formula One team would help that cause (there were three F1 races in North America in 1983 – Long Beach, Detroit and Canada).

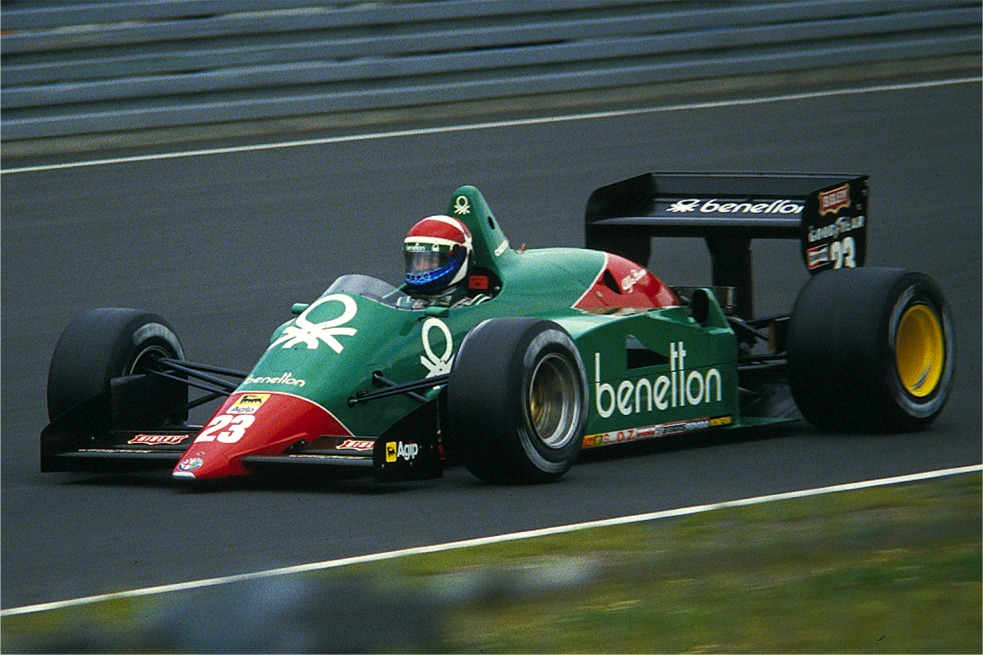
Cheever driving for Alfa Romeo at the 1985 German Grand Prix

In six more seasons, Cheever never drove another truly competitive F1 car. After leaving Renault, Cheever had two unsuccessful seasons with Alfa Romeo as a teammate to Italian Riccardo Patrese. The thirsty and underpowered 890T V8 turbo engine used in the Alfas generally saw results few and far between, though it was generally believed Cheever outperformed his teammate despite failing to qualify for the 1984 Monaco Grand Prix. Patrese, though, scored the only podium finish for the team in those two years when he finished third in the 1984 Italian Grand Prix. Cheever had been third with six laps remaining but his Alfa ran out of fuel, handing the place to Patrese (the team had set Cheever's 890T engine for speed while setting Patrese for an economy run in the hope of a good finish). 1985 was not helped by the team's car, the Alfa Romeo 185T, which proved to be extremely uncompetitive, forcing the team to upgrade its 1984 car, the 184T to 1985 specifications and use it for the last half of the season, though the old car did not improve results despite proving slightly faster as the fuel issue remained. Late in the 1985 season, Alfa announced they were pulling out of F1 at the end of the year, leaving Cheever without an F1 drive, while Patrese went back to Brabham in place of Nelson Piquet, who was moving to Williams.

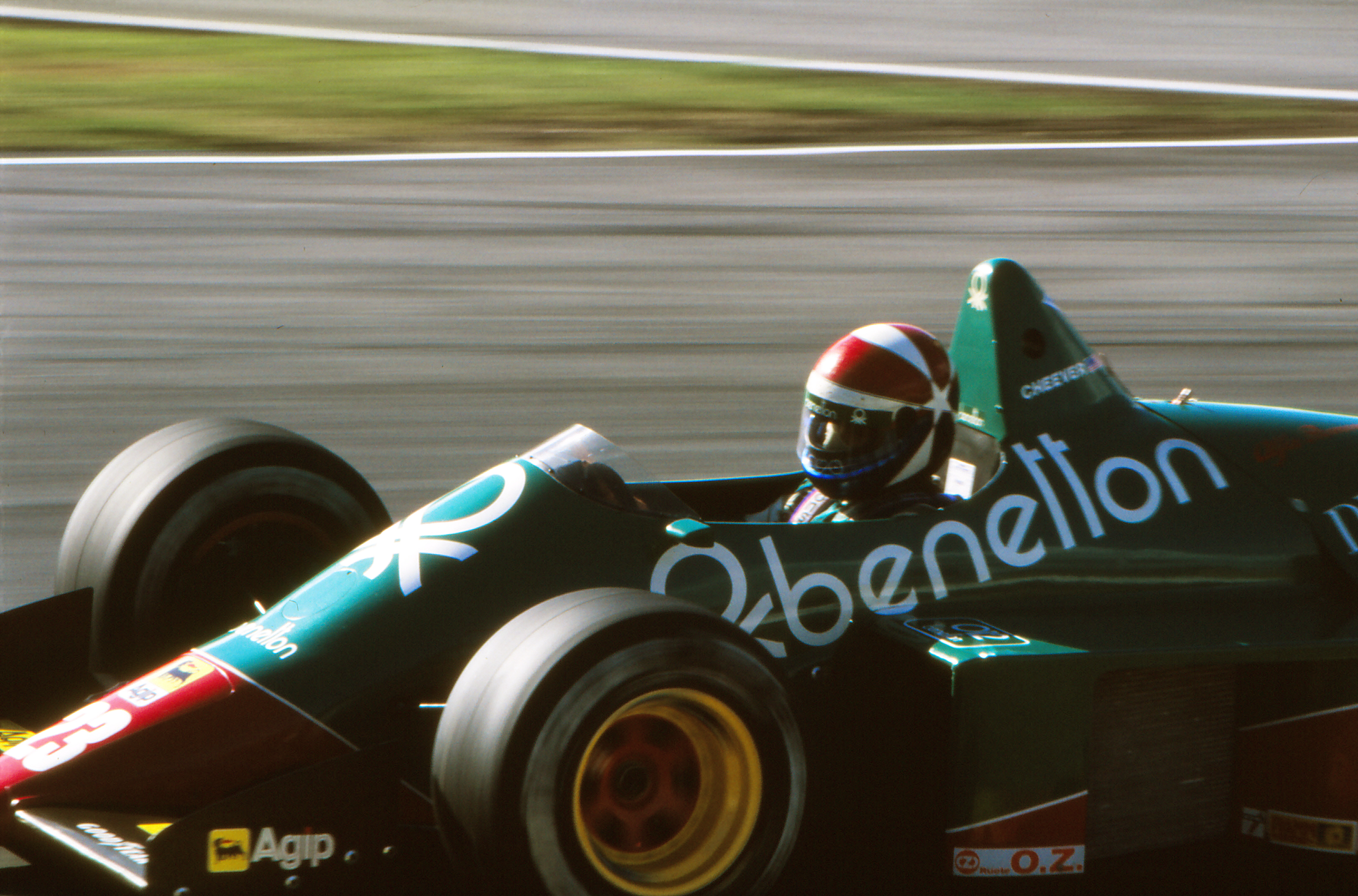
Cheever during practice for the 1985 European Grand Prix

While racing in the World Sportscar Championship for Tom Walkinshaw Racing's Jaguar team, Cheever raced in only one F1 Grand Prix in 1986. This was for the American owned and sponsored Haas Lola team at Detroit, as a replacement for the injured Patrick Tambay. Cheever actually qualified the unfamiliar Lola THL2 with its turbocharged Ford V6 engine in tenth position. Regular team driver, 1980 World Champion Alan Jones, could only qualify his car 21st. Both Lolas retired with steering damage in the race, Jones on lap 33, Cheever four laps later. Cheever was only the third choice to replace Tambay for the race. Team owner Carl Haas had originally asked the lead driver in his CART team, 1978 World Champion Mario Andretti to drive. Mario declined however but recommended his son Michael as a replacement. However, when Michael was unable to obtain a FIA Superlicence for the race, Haas turned to the experienced Cheever, who quickly agreed to an F1 comeback.

For 1987, Cheever was signed by Arrows team boss Jackie Oliver to partner British driver Derek Warwick (Cheever's appointment coincided with the U.S.-based USF&G financial group becoming the team's major sponsor). Cheever and Warwick (who had been teammates at TWR the previous year) were evenly matched and would have many on-track battles throughout 1987 and 1988. He secured third place at the 1988 Italian Grand Prix at Monza; at one stage, he was almost disqualified when his Arrows A10B's 150-liter fuel tank was found to actually contain 151 liters. Luckily, further examination revealed the tank size to be 149 liters and his third-place stood. The podium cost him a new pair of sunglasses for the chief mechanic. Monza, won by the Ferrari of Gerhard Berger, was the only time the McLaren-Hondas of Alain Prost and 1988 World Champion Ayrton Senna did not win a race in 1988. Cheever's third place in the 1988 Italian Grand Prix was also the final podium for the turbocharged I4 BMW M12 engine (badged as "Megatron" in 1987 and 1988). At the time, it was the oldest turbo engine in use in Formula One, having been first used by the Brabham team in 1982.

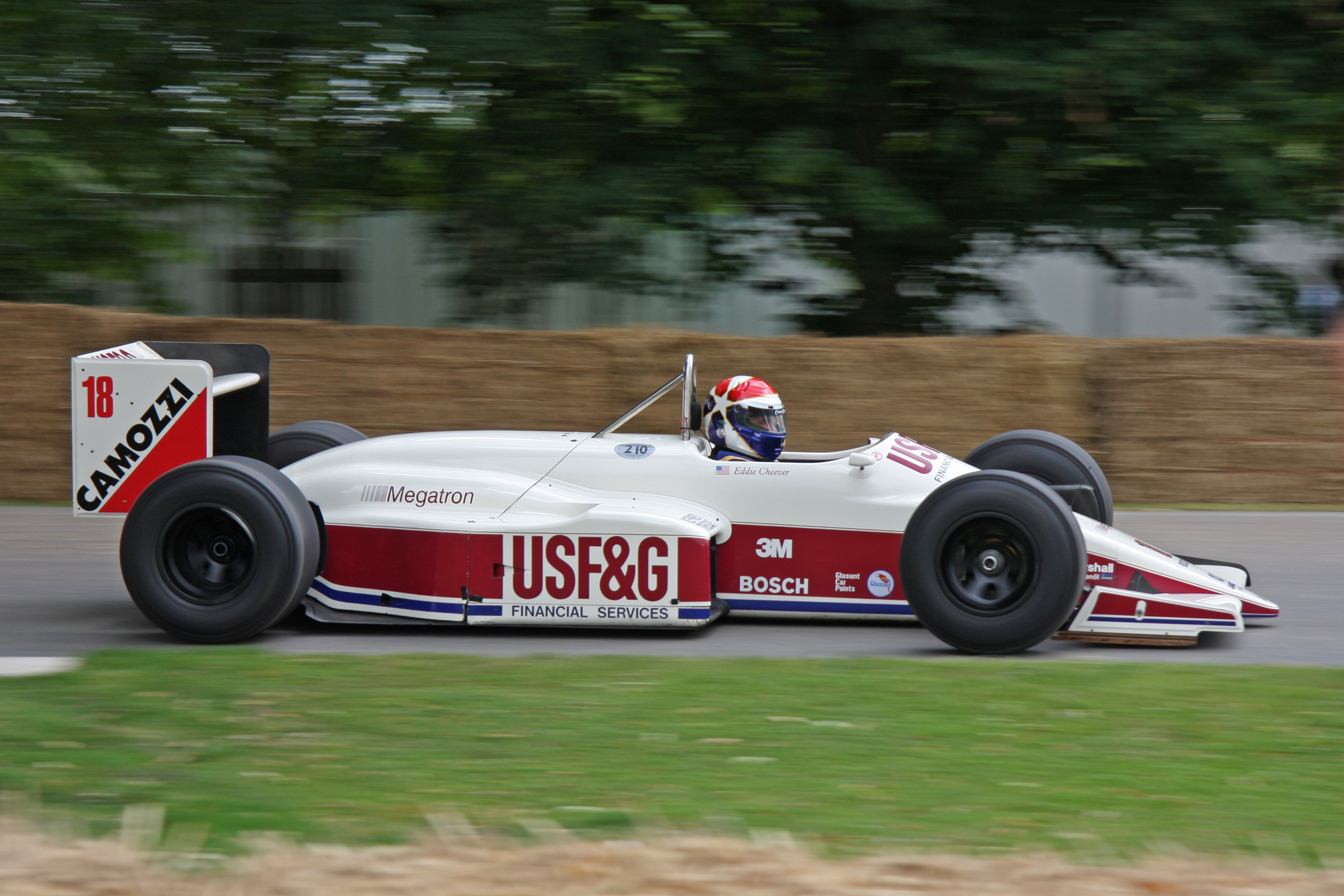
Cheever driving his 1988 Arrows A10B-Megatron at the 2008 Goodwood Festival of Speed

Cheever's final podium finish came at the 1989 United States Grand Prix in his birthplace of Phoenix, where he was involved in a race-long battle with the Williams-Renault of former Alfa Romeo teammate Riccardo Patrese for second place, but then had to give way at the later stages of the race when his brakes started to fade (he claimed that one of his front brakes had actually stopped working). Cheever's last race in Formula One was at the very wet 1989 Australian Grand Prix in Adelaide. During the last seconds of qualifying, he got out of shape coming out of the Fosters Hairpin onto the pit straight and clouted the wall hard with his Arrows A11-Ford, destroying the rear of the car. In the race, he was the last to retire, spinning off on lap 42 after driving for many laps with another car's front wing lodged in his Arrows' sidepod.

During his final season in Formula One, Cheever remained competitive (when he finished, his average finishing place was seventh), but he became increasingly bemused by his inability to qualify well (his average qualifying position was 23rd, compared to Warwick's fourteenth). His best qualifying position for the season with sixteenth in both Canada and Hungary, and he even failed to qualify for the British Grand Prix at Silverstone and the Italian Grand Prix at Monza, where he had finished third the previous year.

In all, Cheever participated in 143 Grands Prix, achieved nine podiums, and scored a total of seventy championship points. His best year was 1983, when he finished seventh in the championship, scored three podium finishes and one front row start for Renault.

== CART ==
Eddie Cheever

CART World Series
- Years active: 1986, 1990–1995
- Teams: Arciero Racing; Chip Ganassi Racing; Team Menard; King Racing; Turley Motorsports; A. J. Foyt Enterprises
- Starts: 82
- Wins: 0
- Poles: 0
- Best finish: 9th in 1990, 1991

Awards
- 1990: CART Rookie of the Year; Indianapolis 500 Rookie of the Year

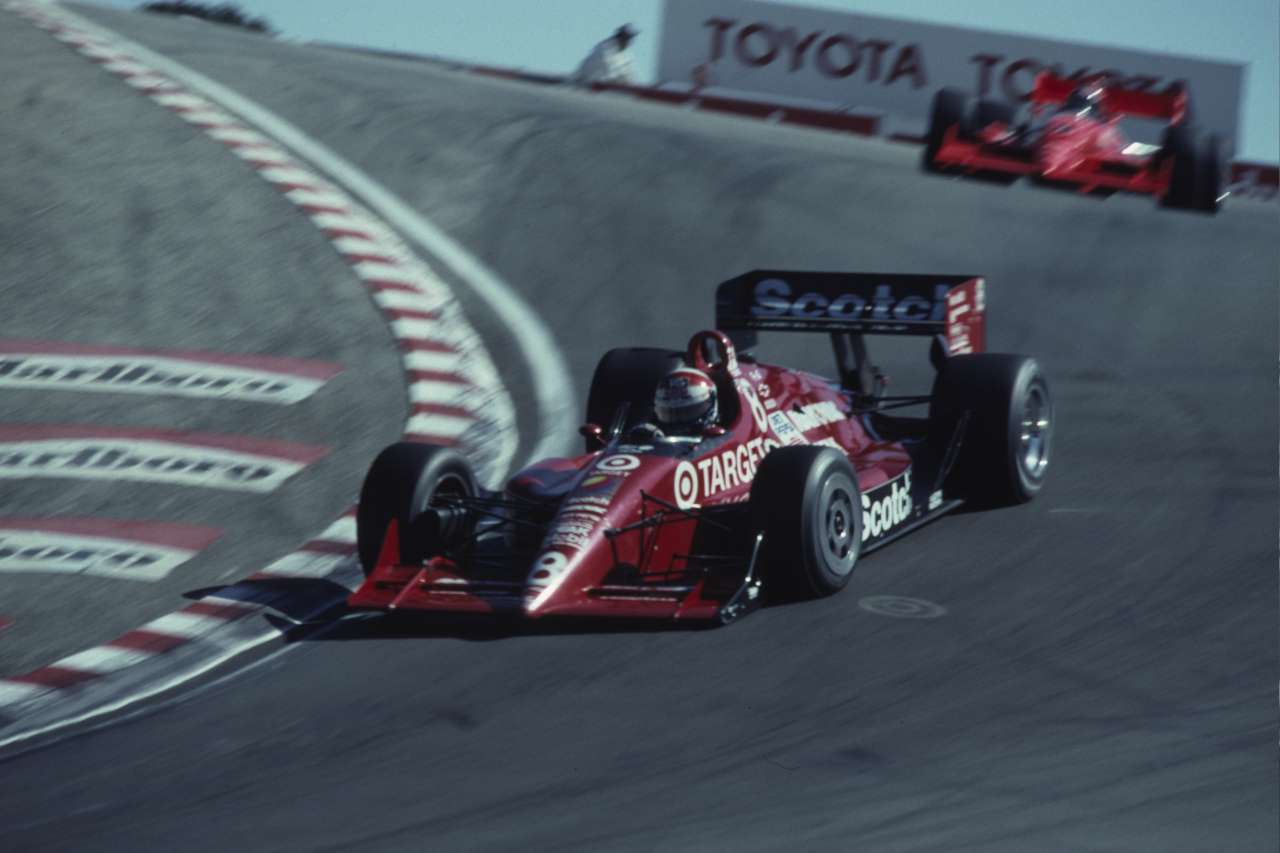
Cheever driving for Chip Ganassi Racing at Laguna Seca Raceway in 1991

From 1986 to 1988, while still driving in Formula One, Cheever won ten sports car races for Jaguar. In 1990 he moved to the US to drive for Chip Ganassi Racing in the CART series. In his first attempt at the Indianapolis 500, he finished eighth and was named the race's Rookie of the Year, as well as CART's Rookie of the Year. In 1992, he qualified second for the race and finished fourth. In total, he scored four podium finishes in the series but never won. Driving for A. J. Foyt's team, Cheever came closest to victory at Nazareth in 1995: he was leading the race on the last lap when he ran out of fuel. In the Indy 500, Cheever was involved in a nasty first lap crash with Stan Fox, Carlos Guerrero and Lyn St. James. Fox was severely injured in the crash.

== Indianapolis 500 and Indy Racing League ==
Eddie Cheever

Indy Racing League IndyCar Series
- Years active: 1996–2002, 2006
- Teams: Team Menard; Cheever Racing
- Starts: 77
- Wins: 5
- Poles: 1
- Best finish: 3rd in 1996–1997, 2000

Championship titles
- 1998: Indianapolis 500 Winner

In 1996 the Indy Racing League began, and Cheever moved there from CART. Cheever ran for Team Menard for the three-race series, and at the 1996 Indianapolis 500, he set the fastest race lap to date at 236.103 mph (379.971 km/h). Cheever then set up his own team and had his first race as a driver/owner at New Hampshire later that year in August, which was the first race of the next season.

In 1998, all the pieces came together for Cheever when he took the biggest win of his career. He started from seventeenth position and led 76 of two-hundred laps to win the 82nd Indianapolis 500, despite sliding in the first turn of the race's first lap, helping bring out the race's first caution period. He was the first owner/driver to win the race since A. J. Foyt (one of Cheever's former bosses) in 1977.

Cheever's IRL team, active until July 2006, ran cars for Alex Barron and Patrick Carpentier in 2005. Having hung up his helmet in 2002, except for occasional instances such as the 2006 24 Hours of Daytona where he competed in the first race with his new Grand-Am series team, Cheever announced on February 21, 2006, he would come out of retirement to run his own car in the IRL's first four races, including the Indianapolis 500. He shut his team down after the eighth race of the season due to lack of sponsorship. The team continued to compete in the Grand-Am Rolex Sports Car Series.

Cheever provided television commentary on ABC for the IndyCar Series and the Indianapolis 500 from 2008 to 2018 with Allen Bestwick and Scott Goodyear, a former three-time runner-up in the Indy 500 who also drove for Team Cheever in 2001.

== GP Masters ==
Eddie Cheever, Silverstone GP Masters, 2006

In 2005, Cheever competed in the GP Masters series which is open to former Formula One drivers over the age of 45. In the championship's first-ever event at Kyalami International Raceway in South Africa, Cheever finished in eighth position. Cheever finished fourth in the second GP Masters race on April 29, 2006, at the Losail International Circuit in Qatar.

In the third GP Masters race on August 13, 2006, at the Silverstone Circuit in England, Cheever took the victory under wet track conditions.

== Personal life ==
Cheever shares a daughter and a son, driver Eddie Cheever III, with ex-wife Rita Cheever. He has a son from his previous relationship with Heather Handley. In 2013, Cheever married his wife, Dianna, and their daughter was born later that same year.

== Racing record ==
=== Career summary ===
Season	Series	Team	Races	Wins	Poles	F/Laps	Podiums	Points	Position
1975	British Formula Three	Henry Morrogh Racing Driving School	11	2	1	1	2	21	7th
1976	European Formula Two	Project Four Racing	10	0	0	0	1	10	9th
1977	European Formula Two	Project Four Racing	12	2	1	1	6	40	**2nd**
1977	World Championship for Makes	BMW Alpina	2	0	0	0	2	0	NC
1978	European Formula Two	Project Four Racing	12	0	0	1	3	22	4th
1978	World Sportscar Championship	BMW Italia-Osella	3	0	0	0	1	0	NC
1978	Formula One	Olympus Cameras with Hesketh Racing	1	0	0	0	0	0	NC
1979	European Formula Two	Osella Squadra Corse	12	3	1	2	3	32	4th
1979	BMW M1 Procar Championship	Osella Squadra Corse	1	0	0	0	0	3	24th
1979	World Sportscar Championship	Lancia Corse	1	0	0	0	0	0	NC
1980	Formula One	Osella Racing Team	10	0	0	0	0	0	NC
1980	World Sportscar Championship	Lancia Corse	7	1	0	0	4	0	NC
1980	BMW M1 Procar Championship	GS Team	1	0	0	0	0	0	NC
1981	Formula One	Tyrrell Racing Team	14	0	0	0	0	10	12th
1981	World Sportscar Championship	Martini Racing	4	0	0	0	0	20	111th
1982	Formula One	Équipe Talbot Gitanes	14	0	0	0	3	15	12th
1983	Formula One	Équipe Renault Elf	15	0	0	0	4	22	7th
1984	Formula One	Benetton Team Alfa Romeo	15	0	0	0	0	3	16th
1985	Formula One	Benetton Team Alfa Romeo	16	0	0	0	0	0	NC
1986	World Sportscar Championship	Silk Cut Jaguar	9	1	0	1	3	61	5th
1986	Formula One	Team Haas (USA) Ltd.	1	0	0	0	0	0	NC
1986	PPG Indy Car World Series	Arciero Racing	1	0	0	0	0	0	NC
1987	Formula One	USF&G Arrows Megatron	16	0	0	0	0	8	10th
1987	World Sportscar Championship	Silk Cut Jaguar	7	3	1	1	4	100	4th
1988	Formula One	USF&G Arrows Megatron	16	0	0	0	1	6	12th
1988	World Sportscar Championship	Silk Cut Jaguar	8	4	0	0	6	182	4th
1989	Formula One	USF&G Arrows Ford	14	0	0	0	1	6	11th
1990	PPG Indy Car World Series	Chip Ganassi Racing	16	0	0	0	2	80	9th
1991	PPG Indy Car World Series	Chip Ganassi Racing	17	0	0	0	1	91	9th
1992	PPG Indy Car World Series	Chip Ganassi Racing	16	0	0	0	1	80	10th
1993	PPG Indy Car World Series	Turley	4	0	0	0	0	21	17th
1993	PPG Indy Car World Series	King Racing	3	0	0	0	0	21	17th
1993	PPG Indy Car World Series	Dick Simon Racing	1	0	0	0	0	21	17th
1993	PPG Indy Car World Series	Team Menard	1	0	0	0	0	21	17th
1994	PPG Indy Car World Series	A. J. Foyt Enterprises	7	0	0	0	0	5	27th
1994	PPG Indy Car World Series	Team Menard	1	0	0	0	0	5	27th
1995	PPG Indy Car World Series	A. J. Foyt Enterprises	15	0	0	0	0	33	18th
1996	Indy Racing League	Team Menard	2	0	0	1	0	147	16th
1996–97	Indy Racing League	Team Cheever	10	1	0	0	1	230	**3rd**
1998	Indy Racing League	Team Cheever	11	1	0	0	2	222	9th
1999	Indy Racing League	Team Cheever	10	1	0	0	1	222	7th
2000	Indy Racing League	Team Cheever	9	1	0	1	1	257	**3rd**
2001	Indy Racing League	Team Cheever	13	1	0	1	2	261	8th
2002	Indy Racing League	Red Bull Cheever Racing	15	0	1	1	0	280	10th
2005	Grand Prix Masters	Team Altech	1	0	0	0	0	N/A	NC
2006	IndyCar Series	Cheever Racing	7	0	0	0	0	114	19th
2006	Grand Prix Masters	Team Altech	1	0	0	0	0	N/A	NC
2006	Grand Prix Masters	Team GPM	1	1	0	0	1	N/A	NC

=== Complete European Formula Two Championship results ===
(key) (Races in bold indicate pole position; races in italics indicate fastest lap)

Year	Entrant	Chassis	Engine	1	2	3	4	5	6	7	8	9	10	11	12	13	Pos.	Pts
1976	Project Four Racing	March 752	Lancia-Ferrari	HOC; DNQ													9th	10
1976	Project Four Racing	March 752	Hart 420R		THR; 4	VLL; DSQ	SAL; Ret	PAU; Ret	HOC; Ret	ROU; Ret	MUG		EST; 5				9th	10
1976	Project Four Racing	March 762	Hart 420R									PER; 3					9th	10
1976	Project Four Racing	Ralt RT1	Hart 420R											NOG; 8	HOC; 15		9th	10
1977	Project Four Racing	Ralt RT1	BMW	SIL; 7	THR; 2	HOC; Ret	NÜR; 1	VLL; 3	PAU; Ret	MUG; 17	**ROU**; 1	NOG; 5	PER; Ret	MIS; 2	EST; 3	DON	**2nd**	**40**
1978	Project Four Racing	March 782	BMW	THR; 4	HOC; Ret	NÜR; 3	PAU; 5	MUG; 7	VLL; Ret	ROU; 2	DON; Ret	NOG; 9	PER; 2	MIS; 6	HOC; Ret		4th	22
1979	Osella Squadra Corse	Osella FA2/79	BMW	**SIL**; 1	HOC; 5	THR; Ret	NÜR; 8	VLL; Ret	MUG; Ret	PAU; 1	HOC; Ret	ZAN; 1	PER; 5	MIS; 6	DON; 7		4th	32

=== Complete Formula One World Championship results ===
(key)

Year	Entrant	Chassis	Engine	1	2	3	4	5	6	7	8	9	10	11	12	13	14	15	16	WDC	Points
1978	Theodore Racing Hong Kong	Theodore TR1	Ford Cosworth DFV	ARG; DNQ	BRA; DNQ															NC	0
1978	Olympus Cameras with Hesketh Racing	Hesketh 308E	Ford Cosworth DFV			RSA; Ret	USW	MON	BEL	ESP	SWE	FRA	GBR	GER	AUT	NED	ITA	USA	CAN	NC	0
1980	Osella Racing Team	Osella FA1	Ford Cosworth DFV	ARG; DNQ	BRA; DNQ	RSA; Ret	USW; Ret	BEL; DNQ	MON; DNQ	FRA; Ret	GBR; Ret	GER; Ret	AUT; Ret	NED; Ret						NC	0
1980	Osella Racing Team	Osella FA1B	Ford Cosworth DFV												ITA; 12	CAN; Ret	USA; Ret			NC	0
1981	Team Tyrrell	Tyrrell 010	Ford Cosworth DFV	USW; 5	BRA; NC	ARG; Ret	SMR; Ret	BEL; 6	MON; 5	ESP; NC	FRA; 13	GBR; 4								12th	10
1981	Team Tyrrell	Tyrrell 011	Ford Cosworth DFV										GER; 5	AUT; DNQ	NED; Ret	ITA; Ret	CAN; 12	CPL; Ret		12th	10
1982	Équipe Talbot Gitanes	Talbot Ligier JS17	Matra V12	RSA; Ret	BRA; Ret	USW; Ret	SMR	BEL; 3		DET; 2	CAN; 10									12th	15
1982	Équipe Talbot Gitanes	Talbot Ligier JS19	Matra V12						MON; Ret			NED; DNQ	GBR; Ret	FRA; 16	GER; Ret	AUT; Ret	SUI; NC	ITA; 6	CPL; 3	12th	15
1983	Équipe Renault Elf	Renault RE30C	Renault V6 (t/c)	BRA; Ret	USW; 13															7th	22
1983	Équipe Renault Elf	Renault RE40	Renault V6 (t/c)			FRA; 3	SMR; Ret	MON; Ret	BEL; 3	DET; Ret	CAN; 2	GBR; Ret	GER; Ret	AUT; 4	NED; Ret	ITA; 3	EUR; 10	RSA; 6		7th	22
1984	Benetton Team Alfa Romeo	Alfa Romeo 184T	Alfa Romeo V8 (t/c)	BRA; 4	RSA; Ret	BEL; Ret	SMR; 7	FRA; Ret	MON; DNQ	CAN; 11	DET; Ret	DAL; Ret	GBR; Ret	GER; Ret	AUT; Ret	NED; 13	ITA; 9	EUR; Ret	POR; 17	16th	3
1985	Benetton Team Alfa Romeo	Alfa Romeo 185T	Alfa Romeo V8 (t/c)	BRA; Ret	POR; Ret	SMR; Ret	MON; Ret	CAN; 17	DET; 9	FRA; 10										NC	0
1985	Benetton Team Alfa Romeo	Alfa Romeo 184TB	Alfa Romeo V8 (t/c)								GBR; Ret	GER; Ret	AUT; Ret	NED; Ret	ITA; Ret	BEL; Ret	EUR; 11	RSA; Ret	AUS; Ret	NC	0
1986	Team Haas (USA) Ltd.	Lola THL2	Ford V6 (t/c)	BRA	ESP	SMR	MON	BEL	CAN	DET; Ret	FRA	GBR	GER	HUN	AUT	ITA	POR	MEX	AUS	NC	0
1987	USF&G Arrows Megatron	Arrows A10	Megatron Straight-4 (t/c)	BRA; Ret	SMR; Ret	BEL; 4	MON; Ret	DET; 6	FRA; Ret	GBR; Ret	GER; Ret	HUN; 8	AUT; Ret	ITA; Ret	POR; 6	ESP; 8	MEX; 4	JPN; 9	AUS; Ret	10th	8
1988	USF&G Arrows Megatron	Arrows A10B	Megatron Straight-4 (t/c)	BRA; 8	SMR; 7	MON; Ret	MEX; 6	CAN; Ret	DET; Ret	FRA; 11	GBR; 7	GER; 10	HUN; Ret	BEL; 6	ITA; 3	POR; Ret	ESP; Ret	JPN; Ret		12th	6
1988	USF&G Arrows Megatron	Arrows A10	Megatron Straight-4 (t/c)																AUS; Ret	12th	6
1989	USF&G Arrows Ford	Arrows A11	Ford Cosworth DFR	BRA; Ret	SMR; 9	MON; 7	MEX; 7	USA; 3	CAN; Ret	FRA; 7	GBR; DNQ	GER; 12	HUN; 5	BEL; Ret	ITA; DNQ	POR; Ret	ESP; Ret	JPN; 8	AUS; Ret	11th	6

=== Complete 24 Hours of Le Mans results ===
Year	Team	Co-Drivers	Car	Class	Laps	Pos.	Class Pos.
1980	(Italy) Jolly Club - Lancia Corse	(Italy) Carlo Facetti (Italy) Martino Finotto	Lancia Beta Monte Carlo	Gr.5	272	19th*	**2nd***
1981	(Italy) Martini Racing	(Italy) Michele Alboreto (Italy) Carlo Facetti	Lancia Beta Monte Carlo	Gr.5	322	8th	**2nd**
1986	(United Kingdom) Silk Cut Jaguar (United Kingdom) Tom Walkinshaw Racing	(United Kingdom) Derek Warwick (France) Jean-Louis Schlesser	Jaguar XJR-6	C1	239	DNF	DNF
1987	(United Kingdom) Silk Cut Jaguar (United Kingdom) Tom Walkinshaw Racing	(Brazil) Raul Boesel (Netherlands) Jan Lammers	Jaguar XJR-8LM	C1	325	5th	5th

* Cheever was listed as DNS

=== American open-wheel ===
(key)

==== CART results ====
Year	Team	No.	Chassis	Engine	1	2	3	4	5	6	7	8	9	10	11	12	13	14	15	16	17	Rank	Points	Ref
1986	Arciero Racing	27	March 86C	Ford Cosworth DFX	PHX	LBH	INDY	MIL	POR	MEA	CLE	TOR	MIS	POC	MDO	SAN	MIS2	ROA	LS	PHX2	MIA; 27	NC	0	
1990	Chip Ganassi Racing	15	Penske PC-18	Chevrolet 265A	PHX; 7	LBH; 13	INDY; 8	MIL; 11	DET; 3	POR; 19				MIS; 4								9th	80	
1990	Chip Ganassi Racing	15	Lola T90/00	Chevrolet 265A							CLE; 16	MEA; 21	TOR; 3		DEN; 20	VAN; 14	MDO; 4	ROA; 9	NAZ; 6	LS; 10		9th	80	
1991	Chip Ganassi Racing	8	Lola T91/00	Chevrolet 265A	SRF; 15	LBH; 3	PHX; 8	INDY; 31	MIL; 7	DET; 12	POR; 9	CLE; 8	MEA; 5	TOR; 17	MIS; 7	DEN; 4	VAN; 12	MDO; 8	ROA; 7	NAZ; 6	LS; 6	9th	91	
1992	Chip Ganassi Racing	9	Lola T91/00	Ford XB	SRF; 8																	10th	80	
1992	Chip Ganassi Racing	9	Lola T92/00	Ford XB		PHX; 2	LBH; 22	INDY; 4	DET; 11	POR; 4	MIL; 5	NHA; 16	TOR; 9	MIS; 20	CLE; 11	ROA; 23	VAN; 16	MDO; 12	NAZ; 9	LS; 4		10th	80	
1993	Turley	69	Penske PC-21	Chevrolet 265B	SRF; 7	PHX; 24	LBH; 9			DET; 21	POR	CLE	TOR	MIS	NHA							17th	21	
1993	Team Menard	59	Lola T92/00	Buick V6 (t/c)				INDY; 16	MIL													17th	21	
1993	Dick Simon Racing	90	Lola T93/00	Ford XB												ROA; 6	VAN					17th	21	
1993	King Racing	40	Lola T93/00	Chevrolet 265C														MDO; 28	NAZ; 10	LS; 14		17th	21	
1994	Team Menard	27	Lola T93/00	Menard V6 (t/c)	SRF	PHX	LBH	INDY; 8	MIL	DET	POR	CLE	TOR									27th	5	
1994	A. J. Foyt Enterprises	14	Lola T94/00	Ford XB										MIS; 21	MDO; 17	NHA; 21	VAN; 17	ROA; 27	NAZ; 24	LS; 25		27th	5	
1995	A. J. Foyt Enterprises	14	Lola T95/00	Ford XB	MIA; 14	SRF; 7	PHX; 14	LBH; 4	NAZ; 5	INDY; 31		DET; 25	POR; 25	ROA; 17	TOR; 11	CLE; 22	MIS; 19	MDO; 10	NHA; 17	VAN	LS	18th	33	
1995	A. J. Foyt Enterprises	14	Lola T94/00	Ford XB							MIL; 26											18th	33	

==== IRL IndyCar Series results ====
Year	Team	No.	Chassis	Engine	1	2	3	4	5	6	7	8	9	10	11	12	13	14	15	Rank	Points	Ref
1996	Team Menard	3	Lola T95/00	Menard V6 (t/c)	WDW; 10	PHX; Wth	INDY; 11													16th	147	
1996–97	Team Cheever	51	Lola T95/00	Menard V6 (t/c)	NHM; 15	LVS; 25														3rd	230	
1996–97	Team Cheever	51	G-Force	Oldsmobile			WDW; 1	PHX; 12	INDY; 23	TXS; 6	PPIR; 4	CLT; 6	NH2; 9	LV2; 21						3rd	230	
1998	Team Cheever	51	Dallara	Oldsmobile	WDW; 24	PHX; 10	INDY; 1	TXS; 26	NHM; 9	DOV; 16	CLT; 20	PPIR; 8	ATL; 3	TX2; 25	LVS; 5					9th	222	
1999	Team Cheever	51	Dallara	Oldsmobile	WDW; 1	PHX; 17														7th	222	
1999	Team Cheever	51	Dallara	Infiniti			CLT; C^{1}	INDY; 18	TXS; 16	PPIR; 4	ATL; 6	DOV; 21	PPI2; 11	LVS; 17	TX2; 4					7th	222	
2000	Team Cheever	51	Riley & Scott	Infiniti	WDW; 3	PHX; 10														3rd	257	
2000	Team Cheever	51	Dallara	Infiniti			LVS; 11	INDY; 5	TXS; 9	PPIR; 1	ATL; 21	KTY; 4	TX2; 2							3rd	257	
2001	Team Cheever	51	Dallara	Infiniti	PHX; 19	HMS; 9	ATL; 24	INDY; 26	TXS; 12	PPIR; 6	RIR; 13	KAN; 1	NSH; 15	KTY; 21	STL; 4	CHI; 3	TX2; 18			8th	261	
2002	Red Bull Cheever Racing	51	Dallara	Infiniti	HMS; 25	PHX; 15	**FON**; 20	NZR; 7	INDY; 5	TXS; 19	PPIR; 8	RIR; 14	KAN; 16	NSH; 6	MIS; 22	KTY; 11	STL; 10	CHI; 5	TX2; 8	10th	280	
2006	Cheever Racing	51	Dallara	Honda	HMS; 10	STP; 11	MOT	INDY; 13	WGL; 17	TXS; 17	RIR; 14	KAN; 14	NSH	MIL	MIS	KTY	SNM	CHI		19th	114	

^{1} The 1999 VisionAire 500K at Charlotte was cancelled after 79 laps due to spectator fatalities. Cheever qualified 18th.

==== CART career summary ====
Year	Team	Wins	Points	Championship Finish
1986	Arciero Racing	0	0	Unclassified
1990	Chip Ganassi Racing	0	80	9th
1991	Chip Ganassi Racing	0	91	9th
1992	Chip Ganassi Racing	0	80	10th
1993	Turley/Menard/Simon/King	0	21	17th
1994	Menard/Foyt	0	5	27th
1995	A. J. Foyt Enterprises	0	33	18th

Best race finish: 2nd (Phoenix – 1992), best championship result: 9th

==== IRL IndyCar career summary ====
Year	Team	Wins	Poles	Points	Championship Finish
1996	Team Menard	0	0	49	16th
1996–1997	Team Cheever	1	0	230	3rd
1998	Team Cheever	1	0	222	9th
1999	Team Cheever	1	0	222	7th
2000	Team Cheever	1	0	257	3rd
2001	Team Cheever	1	0	261	8th
2002	Team Cheever	0	1	280	10th
2006	Cheever Racing	0	0	114	19th

Wins	Poles	Best Championship Finish	Career Points
5	1	3rd (1996–1997, 2000)	1635

==== Indianapolis 500 ====
Year	Chassis	Engine	Start	Finish	Team
1990	Penske PC-18	Chevrolet 265A	14	8	Chip Ganassi Racing
1991	Lola T91/00	Chevrolet 265A	10	31	Chip Ganassi Racing
1992	Lola T92/00	Ford XB	2	4	Chip Ganassi Racing
1993	Lola T92/00	Buick V6 (t/c)	33	16	Team Menard
1994	Lola T93/00	Menard V6 (t/c)	11	8	Team Menard
1995	Lola T95/00	Ford XB	14	31	A. J. Foyt Enterprises
1996	Lola T95/00	Menard V6 (t/c)	4	11	Team Menard
1997	G-Force	Oldsmobile	11	23	Team Cheever
1998	Dallara	Oldsmobile	17	**1**	Team Cheever
1999	Dallara	Infiniti	16	18	Team Cheever
2000	Dallara	Infiniti	10	5	Team Cheever
2001	Dallara	Infiniti	26	25	Team Cheever
2002	Dallara	Infiniti	6	5	Team Cheever
2006	Dallara	Honda	19	13	Cheever Racing

=== International Race of Champions results ===
(key) (Bold – Pole position. * – Most laps led.)

International Race of Champions results
Season	Make	1	2	3	4	Pos.	Points	Ref
1999	Pontiac	DAY; 11	TAL; 8	MCH; 12	IND; 3	7th	31	
2000	Pontiac	DAY; 11	TAL; 10	MCH; 1	IND; 7	5th	46	
2001	Pontiac	DAY; 3	TAL; 5	MCH; 4	IND; 7	4th	47	

=== Complete Grand Prix Masters results ===
(key) Races in bold indicate pole position, races in italics indicate fastest lap.

Year	Team	Chassis	Engine	1	2	3	4	5
2005	Team Altech	Delta Motorsport GPM	Nicholson McLaren 3.5 V8	RSA; 8				
2006	Team Altech	Delta Motorsport GPM	Nicholson McLaren 3.5 V8	QAT; 4	ITA; C			
2006	Team GPM	Delta Motorsport GPM	Nicholson McLaren 3.5 V8			GBR; 1	MAL; C	RSA; C

== Notes ==
Sporting positions
Preceded by Bernard Jourdain; Scott Pruett	Indianapolis 500; Rookie of the Year; 1990	Succeeded by Jeff Andretti
Preceded by Bernard Jourdain	CART; Rookie of the Year; 1990	Succeeded by Jeff Andretti
Preceded by Arie Luyendyk	Indianapolis 500; Winner; 1998	Succeeded by Kenny Bräck
Awards and achievements
Preceded by Eliseo Salazar	Scott Brayton Award; 2000	Succeeded by Davey Hamilton
