= Alfa Romeo 184T =

Formula One car

Alfa Romeo 184T Alfa Romeo 184TB
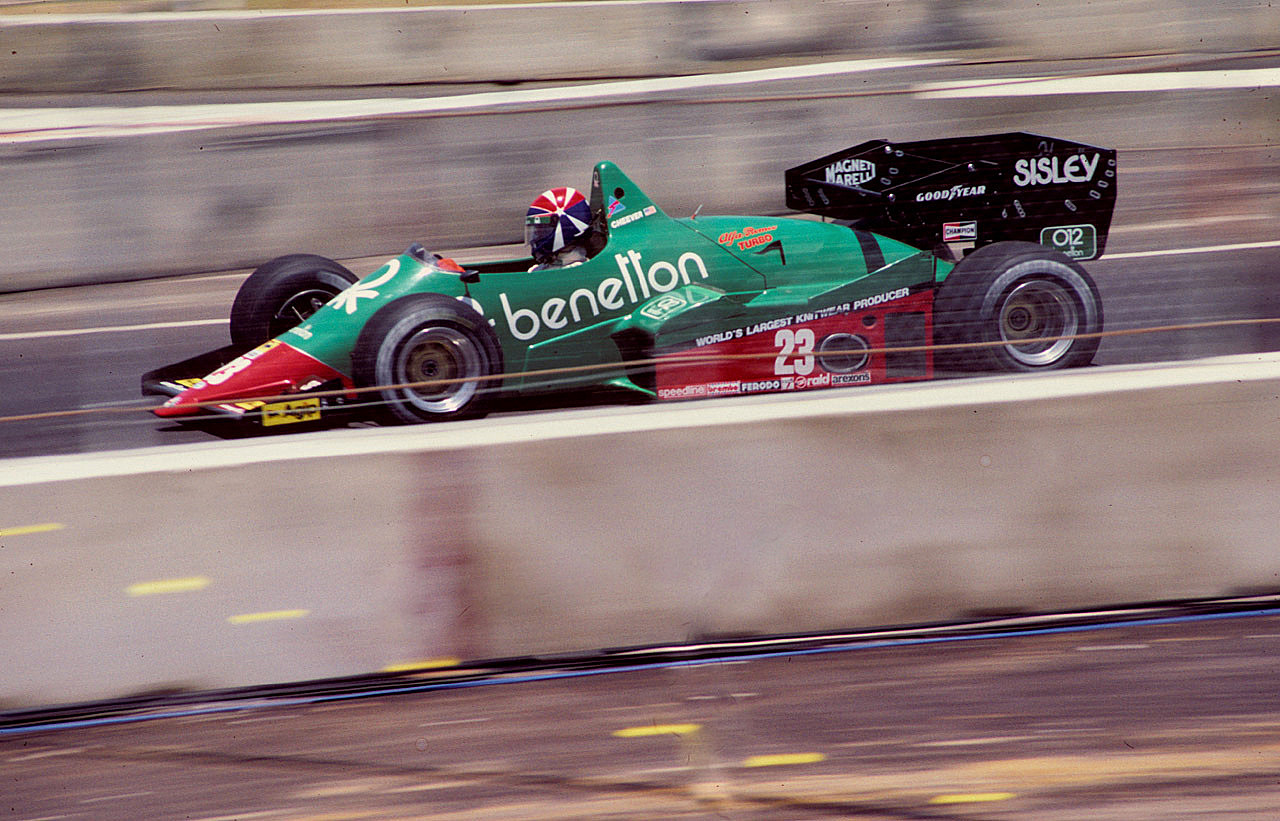
- Eddie Cheever in the Alfa Romeo 184T at the 1984 Dallas Grand Prix
- Category: Formula One
- Constructor: Alfa Romeo
- Designers: Luigi Marmiroli (Technical Director); Mario Tollentino (Chief Designer)
- Predecessor: 183T
- Successor: 185T - engineering; C38 - chronological raced order

Technical specifications
- Chassis: Carbon fibre monocoque
- Suspension (front): Coil, wishbone, pushrod
- Suspension (rear): Coil, wishbone, pushrod
- Axle track: Front: 1,810 mm (71 in); Rear: 1,680 mm (66 in)
- Wheelbase: 2,720 mm (107.1 in)
- Engine: Alfa Romeo 890T, 1,496 cc (91.3 cu in), 90° V8, turbo, mid-engine, longitudinally mounted
- Transmission: Alfa / Hewland 6-speed manual
- Weight: 550 kg (1,212.5 lb)
- Fuel: Agip
- Tyres: Goodyear

Competition history
- Notable entrants: Benetton Team Alfa Romeo
- Notable drivers: 22. (Italy) Riccardo Patrese; 23. (United States) Eddie Cheever
- Debut: 1984 Brazilian Grand Prix
Races	Wins	Podiums	Poles	F/Laps
25	0	1	0	0
- Constructors' Championships: 0
- Drivers' Championships: 0

The Alfa Romeo 184T is a Formula One car which was used by the Alfa Romeo team during the 1984 and 1985 Formula One seasons.

== Design ==
The car had a 1.5 L V8 turbo engine, which produced around 680 hp (507 kW) at 10700 rpm, was Mario Tollentino's first F1 design, and it used the Alfa Romeo 890T engine.

When Alfa's first turbo engine, the 890T, was introduced in 1983 it had comparable power to the top turbo engines of the time – the 4 cylinder BMW and the Renault and Ferrari V6's which at times saw lead driver Andrea de Cesaris able to mix it with the quicker cars, while fuel was not a factor as in-race re-fuelling was allowed. By 1984 however, the 890T had not only been left behind on power by its rivals but also on fuel economy with the engine struggling to cope with the new regulations restricting the cars to just 220 litres of fuel per race.

== Racing history ==
=== 1984: 184T ===
It achieved a total of 11 points, all in 1984. The car's best result was at the 1984 Italian Grand Prix, where Riccardo Patrese came 3rd, at teammate Eddie Cheever's expense as the American was running 3rd, but ran out of fuel. The new fuel regulations saw the Alfas mostly uncompetitive in the races as the engine was notoriously hard on fuel consumption. Also, the lack of power saw both Patrese and Cheever having to push their 184Ts harder just to try to keep in touch (more often than not this was a losing battle) and most of the 184T's retirements were due to the unreliability of the engine that the faster running produced, or the cars simply ran out of fuel.

=== 1985: 184TB ===
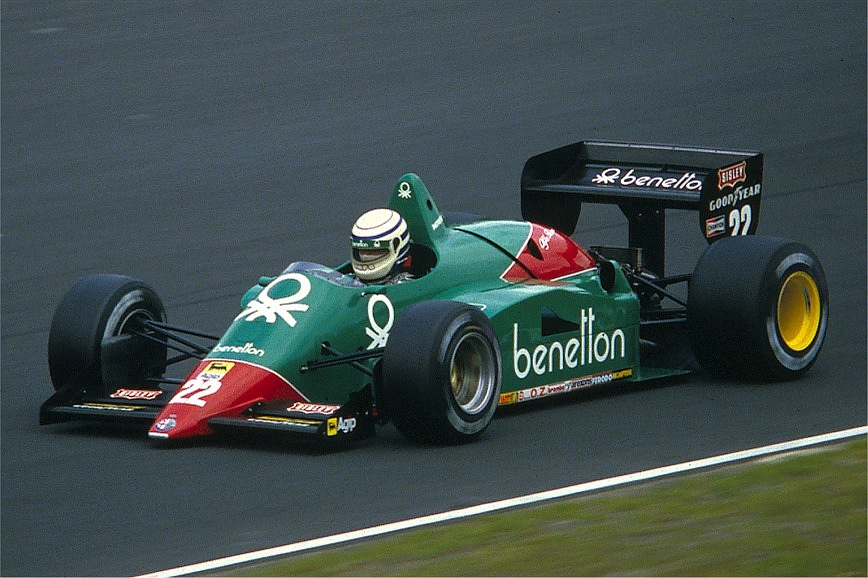
Riccardo Patrese driving the 184TB at the Nürburgring in 1985.

The 184T was replaced for 1985 by the 185T, but the car proved to be uncompetitive so the 184T was brought out of retirement, updated to 1985 regulations and was dubbed the 184TB. The 184TB model would become the last Alfa Romeo car to be raced in Formula One until the manufacturer's return to the sport with the C38 in 2019.

== Livery ==
The car bore the colours of the team's main sponsor, Italian fashion brand Benetton.

== Complete Formula One results ==
(key)

Year	Team/Chassis	Engine	Tyres	Drivers	1	2	3	4	5	6	7	8	9	10	11	12	13	14	15	16	Points	WCC
1984	Alfa Romeo; 184T	Alfa Romeo 890T; V8 tc	G		BRA	RSA	BEL	SMR	FRA	MON	CAN	DET	DAL	GBR	GER	AUT	NED	ITA	EUR	POR	11	8th
1984	Alfa Romeo; 184T	Alfa Romeo 890T; V8 tc	G	Riccardo Patrese	Ret	4	Ret	Ret	Ret	Ret	Ret	Ret	Ret	12	Ret	10	Ret	3	6	8	11	8th
1984	Alfa Romeo; 184T	Alfa Romeo 890T; V8 tc	G	Eddie Cheever	4	Ret	Ret	7	Ret	DNQ	11	Ret	Ret	Ret	Ret	Ret	13	9	Ret	17	11	8th
1985	Alfa Romeo; 184TB	Alfa Romeo 890T; V8 tc	G		BRA	POR	SMR	MON	CAN	DET	FRA	GBR	GER	AUT	NED	ITA	BEL	EUR	RSA	AUS	0	NC
1985	Alfa Romeo; 184TB	Alfa Romeo 890T; V8 tc	G	Riccardo Patrese									Ret	Ret	Ret	Ret	Ret	9	Ret	Ret	0	NC
1985	Alfa Romeo; 184TB	Alfa Romeo 890T; V8 tc	G	Eddie Cheever								Ret	Ret	Ret	Ret	Ret	Ret	11	Ret	Ret	0	NC
