= Alfa Romeo 8-cylinder F1 engine =

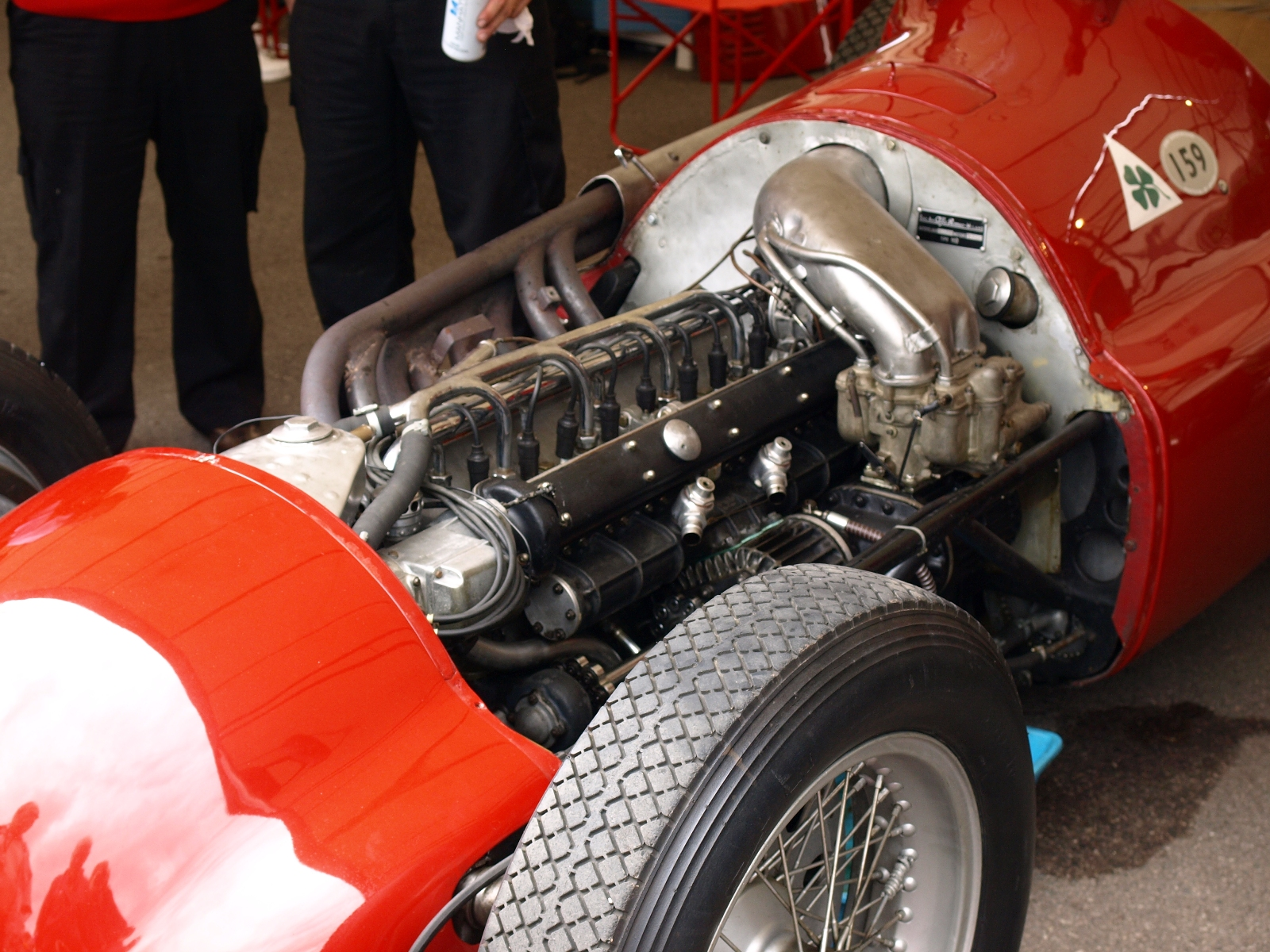

Overview
- Manufacturer: (Italy) Alfa Romeo
- Production: 1950–1951, 1970–1971, 1983–1988

Layout
- Configuration: L-8; 90° V-8
- Displacement: 1.5 L (1,479 cc); 2.0 L (1,995 cc); 3.0 L (2,998 cc); 1.5 L (1,497 cc)
- Cylinder bore: 58 mm (2.3 in); 78 mm (3.1 in); 86 mm (3.4 in); 74 mm (2.9 in)
- Piston stroke: 70 mm (2.8 in); 52.2 mm (2.06 in); 64.4 mm (2.54 in); 43.5 mm (1.71 in)
- Compression ratio: 7.5:1

Combustion
- Supercharger: Supercharged (1950-1951); Naturally-aspirated (1970-1971); Turbocharged (1983-1988)
- Fuel system: Carburetor/Electronic fuel injection
- Fuel type: Methanol/Gasoline
- Cooling system: Water-cooled

Output
- Power output: 190–789 hp (142–588 kW; 193–800 PS) @ 7,500-13,000 rpm
- Torque output: 229–800 N⋅m (169–590 lb⋅ft) @ 4,500-9,800 rpm

Dimensions
- Length: Inline 8: 1,291 millimetres (50.8 in); V8: 831 millimetres (32.7 in)
- Width: Inline 8: 289 millimetres (11.4 in); V8: 666 millimetres (26.2 in)
- Height: Inline 8: 750 millimetres (30 in); V8: 432 millimetres (17.0 in)
- Dry weight: 165 kg (364 lb)

Chronology
- Predecessor: Alfa Romeo 12-cylinder engine

Alfa Romeo has made three 8-cylinder Grand Prix racing engines designed for both Formula One and sports car racing; in both inline and V engine configurations. Their first was the supercharged 158/159, a straight-eight engine, with the 1.5 L engine configuration imposed by the FIA for forced induction engines, in 1950. After a 20-year gap, their second engine was the Tipo 33 engine, a 3-liter naturally-aspirated V8 engine, in 1970. Their third and final engine was the turbocharged 890T V8 engine in 1983, which was used by both Alfa Romeo until 1985, and Osella until 1988, until Alfa Romeo eventually pulled out of F1 that same year.

== 890T ==
The Alfa Romeo 890T (1988: Osella 890T) was a turbocharged racing engine used in the Formula One World Championship from 1983 to 1988 by Alfa Romeo's works team, as well as by Osella. The designation "890T" follows the nomenclature used by Alfa Romeo since the 1960s and reflects two of the key design features of the engine: the number of cylinders (8) and the bank angle (90 degrees). The 890T was the only turbo-era Formula 1 engine to have eight cylinders. It was considered heavy, complex and thirsty. From 1983 to 1984, Alfa and Osella achieved a total of 33 championship points with the 890T; in the remaining years the engine was unsuccessful.

The Italian state-owned company Alfa Romeo had been an engine supplier in Formula 1 since 1970. In 1970 and 1971 Alfa Romeo supplied the McLaren and March works teams with 3.0-litre V8 engines derived from sports car engines. They were only used for individual races. From 1976 Alfa Romeo's Autodelta motorsport department designed naturally aspirated engines with a bank angle of 180 degrees ("boxer engines") or 60 degrees, which were initially used by Brabham, and from 1979 also by their own works team in Formula 1.

In 1977, Renault introduced turbocharged engines in Formula 1 for the first time. After initial reliability problems, the superiority of turbocharged engines over conventional naturally aspirated engines became apparent in 1979. With this in mind, BMW began developing its own turbocharged engines as early as 1978 and Ferrari a year later; Porsche and Honda followed suit in 1980 and 1981 respectively.

At the end of 1979, Alfa Romeo decided to also construct a turbo engine for Formula 1. Development was again at Autodelta in Milan; executive designers were the Autodelta boss Carlo Chiti and three of his employees. After eight months of development, Autodelta unveiled the turbo engine prototype to the public at the Italian Grand Prix. The presentation coincided with the first training session of Ferrari's first turbocharged 126C car.

=== Basic version ===
While BMW and Renault used existing engine concepts for their turbo engines, the Alfa Romeo 890T was completely redesigned. When designing the Alfa turbo engine, Carlo Chiti, unlike all other designers, opted for an eight-cylinder concept. He promised himself a "balanced relationship between performance and complexity". The bank angle was 90 degrees. Each bank of cylinders had two overhead camshafts driven by a timing belt. Chiti had four valves and one spark plug per cylinder.

Forced induction took place via two turbochargers. The first prototypes were equipped with KKK turbochargers. For "political reasons", the pre-series engines used in test drives from 1981 and the later series engines received turbochargers from Avio, a subsidiary of Alfa Romeo. The Avio turbos proved vulnerable in the years that followed.

The mixture was prepared in the prototypes via eight carburetors, with each carburetor supplying one cylinder. Engines equipped in this way were used in test drives well into the summer of 1981. From the spring of 1982, mechanical fuel injection from Spica was available, which was used largely unchanged until the end of the 1984 season. Without electronic support, the mixture preparation could only be controlled inadequately. The lack of effective control of the mixture led to a high number of turbo and engine failures in 1982–84.

=== Development ===
The 890T underwent little further development compared to other turbocharged engines in the 1980s. Although Chiti recognized that the 890T brought some problems with it. However, from 1983 he concentrated on the development of an all-new four-cylinder turbo engine called the 415T, which was to replace the 890T in the 1985 season . after the cylinder heads had been renewed in 1983, the modifications to the 890T in the years that followed were limited to changes in the engine environment.

There was reason for changes primarily in terms of stability and fuel consumption. While there were no restrictions on the amount of petrol used in 1983, the regulations stipulated a maximum consumption of 220 liters per race from 1984. In order to comply with this value, Alfa Romeo had to limit the boost pressure over the course of the season. In some races, the Alfas drove with a boost pressure of just 2.2 bar. They achieved an output of less than 600 hp (441 kW), so they were only slightly more powerful than a Cosworth DFV naturally aspirated engine.

Extensive interventions were made at the beginning of the 1985 season. Gianni Tonti, Chiti's successor at Autodelta since September 1984, replaced the vulnerable Avio turbochargers with units from KKK, which had already been used on the first prototypes in 1981. The mixture preparation was also revised for the first race of the season in 1985. First, the mechanical Spica injection was supplemented by an electronic control system from Jofa, which analogously controlled the amount of fuel used and brought about a reduction in consumption of 8 to 10 percent. Two races later, at the San Marino Grand Prix, the factory Alfa team's 890T engines received Bosch electronic fuel injection, which conceptually corresponded to the system used by BMW, but was two generations older in comparison. Due to these changes, the engine could be run at 3.8 bar in qualifying trim and at 3.0 bar in racing, according to factory specifications. According to Eddie Cheever, these developments reduced gasoline consumption by 20 percent in 1985 compared to the previous year; at the same time, the performance in racing trim increased by 130 hp (96 kW).

The individual development steps were passed on to the Osella customer team with a delay of several months, sometimes even years.

=== Specifications ===
Technical specifications:
Engine: Alfa Romeo 890T
Engine type: Eight-cylinder V-engine (four-stroke), light-alloy
Displacement: 1496.7cc
Bore × Stroke: 74 × 43.5mm
Compression: 7.0:1
Mixture preparation: Mechanical petrol injection Spica / Electronic petrol injection Bosch
Valve control: Four overhead camshafts
Cooling: Water-cooling
Weight: 180 kg
Races: 1983–1988

== Types ==
- 158 (1950–1951): 1,489 cc (90.9 cu in) I-8- 190–425 hp (142–317 kW)
- T33 (1970–1971): 2,998 cc (182.9 cu in) V-8- 400–440 hp (298–328 kW)
- 890T (1983–1988): 1,496 cc (91.3 cu in) V-8- 640–780 hp (477–582 kW)

== Applications ==
- Alfa Romeo 158/159 Alfetta
- Alfa Romeo 183T
- Alfa Romeo 184T
- Alfa Romeo 185T
- McLaren M7D
- McLaren M14D
- March 711
- Osella FA1F
- Osella FA1G
- Osella FA1H
- Osella FA1I
- Osella FA1L
