= Ragno =

Ragno is a surname. Notable people with the surname include:

- Antonella Ragno-Lonzi (born 1940), Italian fencer
- Patrizia Ragno (born 1972), Italian long-distance runner
- Saverio Ragno (1902–1969), Italian fencer, father of Antonella
- Tommaso Ragno (born 1967), Italian actor and narrator
