= Minardi M195 =

Formula One racing car

Minardi M195 Minardi M195B
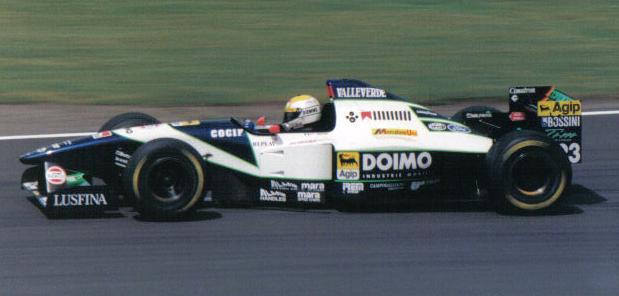
- Pierluigi Martini driving the M195 at the 1995 British Grand Prix
- Category: Formula One
- Constructor: Minardi
- Designers: Aldo Costa (Technical Director); Mauro Gennaro (Chief Designer); Mariano Alperin (Chief Aerodynamicist)
- Predecessor: M194
- Successor: M197

Technical specifications
- Chassis: Carbon fibre monocoque
- Suspension (front): Double wishbones, pushrod
- Suspension (rear): Double wishbones, pushrod
- Engine: 1995: mid-engine, longitudinally mounted, 2,994 cc (182.7 cu in), Ford-Cosworth EDM1, 75° V8, NA; 1996: mid-engine, longitudinally-mounted, 2,994 cc (182.7 cu in), Ford-Cosworth EDM2 / Ford-Cosworth EDM3, 75° V8, NA
- Transmission: Minardi / XTrac 6-speed semi-automatic
- Power: 630 hp @ 13,200 rpm
- Fuel: Agip
- Tyres: Goodyear

Competition history
- Notable entrants: Minardi Scuderia Italia
- Notable drivers: (Italy) Pierluigi Martini (Italy) Luca Badoer (Portugal) Pedro Lamy (Italy) Giancarlo Fisichella (Brazil) Tarso Marques (Italy) Giovanni Lavaggi
- Debut: 1995 Brazilian Grand Prix
Races	Wins	Poles	F/Laps
33	0	0	0
- Constructors' Championships: 0
- Drivers' Championships: 0

The Minardi M195 was a Formula One car designed by Aldo Costa for the Minardi team. The original M195 was used in the 1995 Formula One World Championship while an updated version, the M195B, was used in the 1996 Championship. Across its two seasons of racing the car was driven by Italians Pierluigi Martini, Luca Badoer, Giancarlo Fisichella and Giovanni Lavaggi, Portuguese Pedro Lamy and Brazilian Tarso Marques.

== Mugen-Honda legal case ==
The M195 had been designed to fit a Mugen-Honda engine, as Minardi had been expecting to run Mugen-Honda engines during the 1995 season. A last-minute decision from Mugen to supply Ligier left Minardi struggling to adapt their car to take a Ford Motor Company ED engine. Giancarlo Minardi, the team's owner, threatened legal action over the affair. Minardi stated, "We are very proud because we have had to design two different cars in the time normally needed to do just one. There was an agreement with Mugen Co. Ltd. but this was not respected."

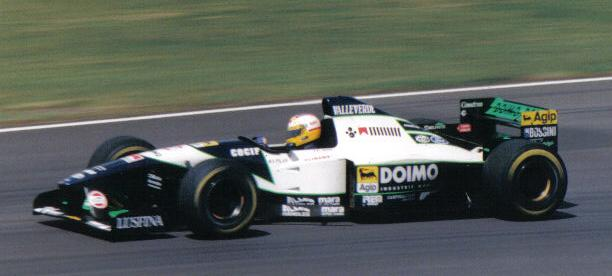
Luca Badoer driving the M195 at the 1995 British Grand Prix

Minardi won the lawsuit, but damages were not awarded. The court ruled that the deal between Minardi and Mugen was "reaching a point of mutual agreement so that it was legitimate to expect that the contract would have been effectively concluded." Minardi appealed the absence of damages and in a counter-move, Flavio Briatore (Ligier's owner at the time) had Minardi's equipment seized at the French Grand Prix due to Minardi owing one of his companies money for their engine deal from 1993. The matter was settled out of court. The money Minardi owed was forgotten and Briatore paid $1 million to Minardi to compensate them for the loss of the Mugen-Honda engines.

== Minardi M195B ==
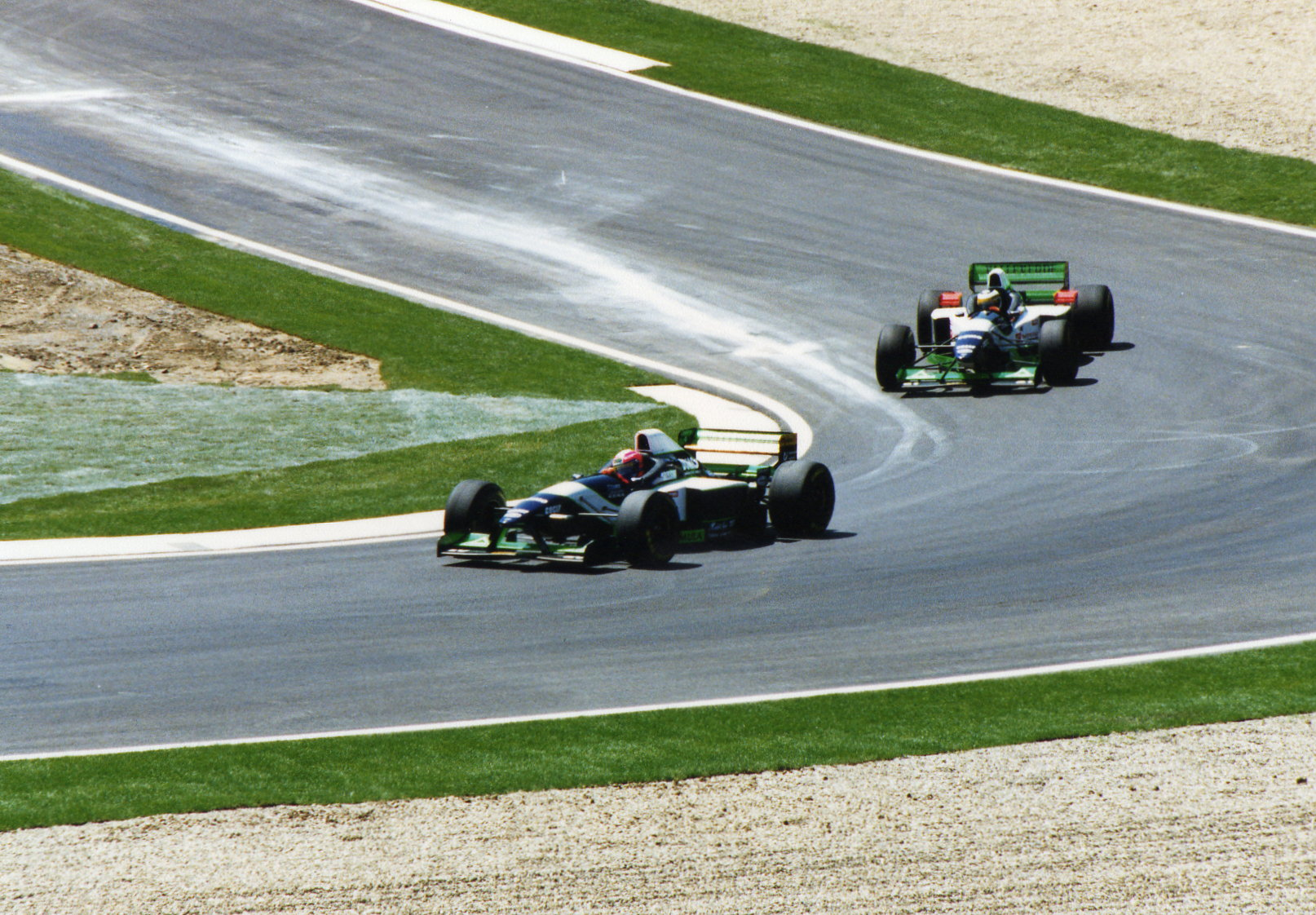
Pedro Lamy and rookie Giancarlo Fisichella driving the M195B at the 1996 San Marino Grand Prix practice session.

The car was upgraded for 1996, with the main visible difference being higher cockpit sides per new rules on driver safety. Pedro Lamy took seat 20; Giancarlo Fisichella, then Tarso Marques, and finally Giovanni Lavaggi took seat 21. The M195B scored no championship points.

== Livery ==
The M195 and the M195B had a black and white colour scheme, with fluorescent green painted wings from major sponsors Doimo and Valleverde.

At the 1995 Australian Grand Prix, a message read "Grazie Adelaide" ("Thank you Adelaide"), as the team said farewell to the city that held the race there.

== Complete Formula One results ==
(key)

Year	Team/Chassis	Engine	Tyres	Drivers	1	2	3	4	5	6	7	8	9	10	11	12	13	14	15	16	17	Pts.	WCC
1995	Minardi; M195	Ford ED; V8	G		BRA	ARG	SMR	ESP	MON	CAN	FRA	GBR	GER	HUN	BEL	ITA	POR	EUR	PAC	JPN	AUS	1	10th
1995	Minardi; M195	Ford ED; V8	G	Pierluigi Martini	DNS	Ret	12	14	7	Ret	Ret	7	Ret									1	10th
1995	Minardi; M195	Ford ED; V8	G	Pedro Lamy										9	10	Ret	Ret	9	13	11	6	1	10th
1995	Minardi; M195	Ford ED; V8	G	Luca Badoer	Ret	DNS	14	Ret	Ret	8	13	10	Ret	8	Ret	Ret	14	11	15	9	DNS	1	10th
1996	Minardi; M195B	Ford ED2/ED3 V8	G		AUS	BRA	ARG	EUR	SMR	MON	ESP	CAN	FRA	GBR	GER	HUN	BEL	ITA	POR	JPN		0	NC
1996	Minardi; M195B	Ford ED2/ED3 V8	G	Pedro Lamy	Ret	10	Ret	12	9	Ret	Ret	Ret	12	Ret	12	Ret	10	Ret	16	12		0	NC
1996	Minardi; M195B	Ford ED2/ED3 V8	G	Giancarlo Fisichella	Ret			13	Ret	Ret	Ret	8	Ret	11								0	NC
1996	Minardi; M195B	Ford ED2/ED3 V8	G	Tarso Marques		Ret	Ret															0	NC
1996	Minardi; M195B	Ford ED2/ED3 V8	G	Giovanni Lavaggi											DNQ	10	DNQ	Ret	15	DNQ		0	NC
