= Pedro Lamy =

Portuguese racing driver (born 1972)

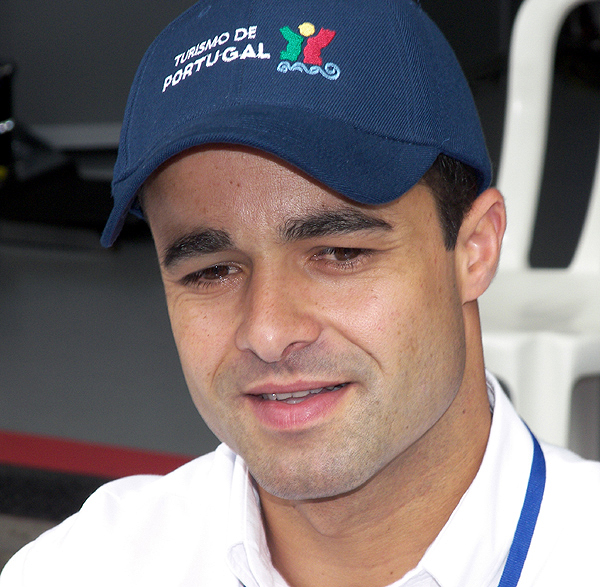
- Lamy in 2007 at Interlagos
- Born: José Pedro Mourão Lamy Viçoso; 20 March 1972 (age 54) Aldeia Galega da Merceana, Alenquer, Portugal
- Categorisation: FIA Platinum (until 2021); FIA Gold (2022–)

Formula One World Championship career
- Nationality: (Portugal) Portuguese
- Active years: 1993–1996
- Team(s): Lotus, Minardi
- Entries: 32
- Championships: 0
- Wins: 0
- Career points: 1
- Pole positions: 0
- Fastest laps: 0
- First entry: 1993 Italian Grand Prix
- Last entry: 1996 Japanese Grand Prix
24 Hours of Le Mans career
- Years: 1997–1999, 2001–2002, 2005–
- Teams: Schübel Engineering, Viper Team Oreca, Mercedes-AMG, Aston Martin Racing, Team Peugeot Total, Larbre Compétition
- Best finish: 2nd (2007, 2011)
- Class wins: 1 (2012)

José Pedro Mourão Nunes Lamy Viçoso, OIH, (Portuguese pronunciation: [ˈpeðɾu laˈmi]; born 20 March 1972) is a Portuguese former professional racing driver. He was the first Portuguese driver to score a point in a Formula One World Championship event, in the 1995 Australian Grand Prix, for Minardi.

== Racing career ==
=== Early years ===
Born in Aldeia Galega da Merceana, Alenquer, Portugal, Lamy graduated from karting and won the Portuguese Formula Ford Championship in his debut year, in 1989, at the age of 17. Taking on Domingos Piedade as a manager, Lamy moved to Formula Opel Lotus and won the championship in his second attempt, in 1991.

With Piedade's help, Lamy went to Germany to race in the local Formula Three series. Signing for Willi Weber's team, he defeated Marco Werner in the fight for the Championship, in 1992, also winning the Marlboro Masters in Zandvoort and finishing second in the Macau Grand Prix. In 1993, he raced for Crypton Engineering in Formula 3000 and finished second in the series, one point behind champion Olivier Panis, although he scored a win at Pau, a narrow street course considered even more difficult than Monaco.

=== Formula One ===
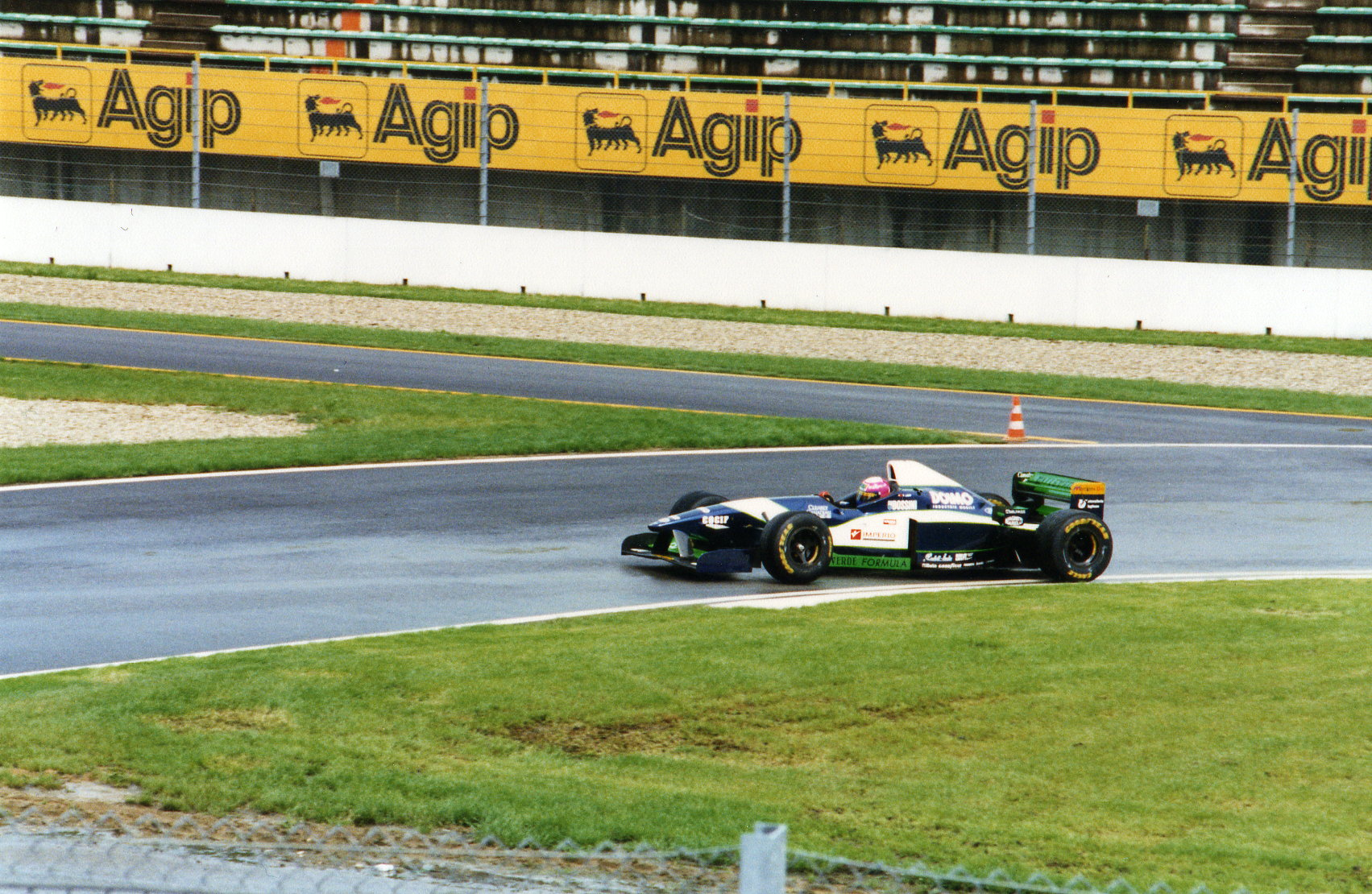
Pedro Lamy during free practice of the 1996 San Marino Grand Prix while racing for Minardi.

==== Lotus (1993–1994) ====
In 1993, Lamy got the chance to race in the final four Formula One races of the season, replacing injured Alessandro Zanardi in the Lotus team. He scored no points, but was signed for the team to drive the full 1994 season. Lamy drove the first four races, before suffering a serious crash in private testing at Silverstone, breaking both legs and wrists and sitting in the sidelines for over a year.

==== Minardi (1995–1996) ====
After intense physical therapy, Lamy signed a contract to race in the second half of the 1995 season for Minardi, replacing Pierluigi Martini, and scoring the team's only point of the season in Adelaide, despite a spectacular spin and struggling to get going again halfway through the race. Lamy stayed with Minardi for 1996, but the team's lack of resources meant the car received little development, and Lamy finished his F1 career, after 32 Grand Prix starts.

=== Sports car racing ===
Afterwards, Lamy moved to the FIA GT Championship, where he won the GT2 class in 1998 in an Oreca Chrysler Viper GTS-R. He then raced in the Le Mans 24 Hours and the DTM for the works Mercedes team, but was unhappy with his treatment within the team.

Switching to the Zakspeed outfit, Lamy won the 24 Hours Nürburgring twice in a row (in 2001 and 2002), taking the V8Star Series crown as well, in 2003. In 2004 he drove for BMW Motorsport in a few selected events including the 24 Hours Nürburgring that he won again. He also won the GTS class in the Le Mans Endurance Series in a Larbre Compétition Ferrari 550 Maranello. For 2005, Lamy was an Aston Martin works driver for the Sebring 12 Hours and Le Mans, also racing for BMW at the 24 Hours Nürburgring where he won again, and for the Larbre team in the FIA GT Championship.

In 2005, Lamy was announced as the driver of A1 Team Portugal in the 2005 A1 Grand Prix. However, Lamy never went beyond testing, and Álvaro Parente was appointed the main driver's seat. Instead, Lamy remained with the Aston Martin Racing squad, taking part in the American Le Mans Series and 24 Hours of Le Mans. In 2007, Lamy became a factory driver for the Peugeot 908 HDi FAP in the Le Mans Series, as well as driving the diesel-powered prototype in the 24 Hours of Le Mans. Lamy became LMP1 champion in the LMS in the first season.

In 2010, driving for BMW Motorsport, Lamy won the 24 Hours Nürburgring for the fifth time, to tie with Marcel Tiemann for the most wins at the race. In 2012, Lamy participated in the FIA World Endurance Championship, driving a Larbre Competition Corvette C6.R in GTE-Am.

As of 2025, Lamy is a FIA (Fédération Internationale de l'Automobile) commissioner.

== Racing record ==
=== Complete German Formula Three results ===
(key) (Races in bold indicate pole position) (Races in italics indicate fastest lap)

Year	Entrant	Engine	Class	1	2	3	4	5	6	7	8	9	10	11	12	13	14	15	16	17	18	19	20	21	22	23	24	25	26	DC	Pts
1992	Opel Team WTS	Opel	A	ZOL; 1 Ret	ZOL; 2; 5	NÜR; 1; 1	**NÜR**; **2**; 16	**WUN**; **1** Ret	WUN; 2 Ret	AVU; 1; 8	AVU; 2; 1	NÜR; 1; 1	**NÜR**; **2**; 1	**HOC**; **1**; 1	**HOC**; **2**; 2	NOR; 1; 3	NOR; 2; 2	**BRN**; **1**; 1	**BRN**; **2**; 1	DIE; 1; 3	DIE; 2; 4	NÜR; 1; 1	**NÜR**; **2**; 2	ALE; 1; 2	ALE; 2; 2	**NÜR**; **1**; 1	**NÜR**; **2** Ret	**HOC**; **1**; 1	**HOC**; **2**; 1	1st	340

=== Complete International Formula 3000 results ===
(key) (Races in bold indicate pole position) (Races in italics indicate fastest lap)

Year	Entrant	Chassis	Engine	1	2	3	4	5	6	7	8	9	Pos.	Pts
1993	Crypton Engineering	Reynard 92D	Ford Cosworth DFV	DON; 2	SIL; DNS	**PAU**; 1	PER; 8†	**HOC**; 2	NÜR; 4	SPA; 4	MAG; 3	NOG; 16	**2nd**	**31**

† Driver did not finish the race, but was classified as he completed over 90% of the race distance.

=== Complete Formula One results ===
(key)

Year	Entrant	Chassis	Engine	1	2	3	4	5	6	7	8	9	10	11	12	13	14	15	16	17	WDC	Pts
1993	Team Lotus	Lotus 107B	Ford HBD6 3.5 V8	RSA	BRA	EUR	SMR	ESP	MON	CAN	FRA	GBR	GER	HUN	BEL	ITA; 11	POR; Ret	JPN; 13	AUS; Ret		NC	0
1994	Team Lotus	Lotus 107C	Mugen Honda MF-351 HC 3.5 V10	BRA; 10	PAC; 8	SMR; Ret	MON; 11	ESP	CAN	FRA	GBR	GER	HUN	BEL	ITA	POR	EUR	JPN	AUS		NC	0
1995	Minardi Scuderia Italia	Minardi M195	Ford EDM 3.0 V8	BRA	ARG	SMR	ESP	MON	CAN	FRA	GBR	GER	HUN; 9	BEL; 10	ITA; Ret	POR; Ret	EUR; 9	PAC; 13	JPN; 11	AUS; 6	18th	1
1996	Minardi Team	Minardi M195B	Ford ED2 3.0 V8	AUS; Ret	BRA; 10	ARG; Ret	EUR; 12	SMR; 9	MON; Ret	ESP; Ret	CAN; Ret	FRA; 12	GBR; Ret	GER; 12	HUN; Ret	BEL; 10	ITA; Ret	POR; 16	JPN; 12		NC	0

=== 24 Hours of Le Mans results ===
Year	Team	Co-Drivers	Car	Class	Laps	Pos.	Class Pos.
1997	(Germany) Schübel Engineering	(Germany) Armin Hahne (France) Patrice Goueslard	Porsche 911 GT1	GT1	331	5th	**3rd**
1998	(France) Viper Team Oreca	(Monaco) Olivier Beretta (United States) Tommy Archer	Chrysler Viper GTS-R	GT2	312	13th	**2nd**
1999	(Germany) AMG-Mercedes	(Germany) Bernd Schneider (France) Franck Lagorce	Mercedes-Benz CLR	LMGTP	76	DNF	DNF
2001	(France) Team PlayStation	(Monaco) Olivier Beretta (Austria) Karl Wendlinger	Chrysler LMP	LMP900	298	4th	**3rd**
2002	(France) PlayStation Team Oreca	(Monaco) Olivier Beretta (France) Érik Comas	Dallara SP1-Judd	LMP900	359	5th	4th
2005	(United Kingdom) Aston Martin Racing	(Netherlands) Peter Kox (Czech Republic) Tomáš Enge	Aston Martin DBR9	GT1	327	DNF	DNF
2006	(United Kingdom) Aston Martin Racing	(France) Stéphane Sarrazin (Monaco) Stéphane Ortelli	Aston Martin DBR9	GT1	342	10th	5th
2007	(France) Team Peugeot Total	(France) Stéphane Sarrazin (France) Sébastien Bourdais	Peugeot 908 HDi FAP	LMP1	359	**2nd**	**2nd**
2008	(France) Team Peugeot Total	(France) Stéphane Sarrazin (Austria) Alexander Wurz	Peugeot 908 HDi FAP	LMP1	368	5th	5th
2009	(France) Team Peugeot Total	(France) Nicolas Minassian (Austria) Christian Klien	Peugeot 908 HDi FAP	LMP1	369	6th	6th
2010	(France) Peugeot Sport Total	(France) Sébastien Bourdais (France) Simon Pagenaud	Peugeot 908 HDi FAP	LMP1	38	DNF	DNF
2011	(France) Team Peugeot Total	(France) Sébastien Bourdais (France) Simon Pagenaud	Peugeot 908	LMP1	355	**2nd**	**2nd**
2012	(France) Larbre Compétition	(France) Patrick Bornhauser (France) Julien Canal	Chevrolet Corvette C6.R	GTE; Am	329	20th	**1st**
2013	(United Kingdom) Aston Martin Racing	(Canada) Paul Dalla Lana (United States) Bill Auberlen	Aston Martin Vantage GTE	GTE; Pro	221	DNF	DNF
2014	(United Kingdom) Aston Martin Racing	(Canada) Paul Dalla Lana (Denmark) Christoffer Nygaard	Aston Martin Vantage GTE	GTE; Am	329	26th	6th
2015	(United Kingdom) Aston Martin Racing	(Canada) Paul Dalla Lana (Austria) Mathias Lauda	Aston Martin Vantage GTE	GTE; Am	321	NC	NC
2016	(United Kingdom) Aston Martin Racing	(Canada) Paul Dalla Lana (Austria) Mathias Lauda	Aston Martin Vantage GTE	GTE; Am	281	DNF	DNF
2017	(United Kingdom) Aston Martin Racing	(Canada) Paul Dalla Lana (Austria) Mathias Lauda	Aston Martin Vantage GTE	GTE; Am	329	36th	8th
2018	(United Kingdom) Aston Martin Racing	(Canada) Paul Dalla Lana (Austria) Mathias Lauda	Aston Martin Vantage GTE	GTE; Am	92	DNF	DNF
2019	(United Kingdom) Aston Martin Racing	(Canada) Paul Dalla Lana (Austria) Mathias Lauda	Aston Martin Vantage GTE	GTE; Am	87	DNF	DNF

=== Complete FIA GT Championship results ===
(key) (Races in bold indicate pole position) (Races in italics indicate fastest lap)

Year	Team	Car	Class	1	2	3	4	5	6	7	8	9	10	11	Pos.	Pts
1997	Schübel Rennsport	Porsche 911 GT1	GT1	HOC; 6	SIL; 7	HEL	NÜR	SPA	A1R						34th	1
1997	Porsche AG	Porsche 911 GT1 Evo	GT1							SUZ; 10	DON	MUG	SEB	LAG	34th	1
1998	Viper Team Oreca	Chrysler Viper GTS-R	GT2	OSC; 1	SIL; 1	**HOC**; 1	**DIJ**; 1	HUN; 2	SUZ; 1	DON; 1	A1R; 2	HOM; 1	LAG; 1		1st	92
2005	Larbre Compétition	Ferrari 550-GTS Maranello	GT1	MNZ; 1	MAG; 5		IMO; 2	BRN; 1		OSC; 7	IST; 6	ZHU; 2	DUB; 1	BHR; 4	8th	60
2005	Aston Martin Racing^{†}	Aston Martin DBR9	GT1			SIL; 1			SPA; 5						8th	60
2006	Manthey Racing^{†}	Porsche 997 GT3-RSR	G2	SIL	BRN	OSC	**SPA**; 2	PRI	DIJ	MUG	HUN	ADR	DUB		NC	0
2007	Vitaphone Racing Team	Maserati MC12 GT1	GT1	ZHU	SIL	BUC	MNZ	OSC	SPA; 2	ADR	BRN	NOG	ZOL		20th	14
2008	Larbre Compétition	Saleen S7-R	GT1	SIL	MNZ	ADR	OSC	**SPA**; DNS	BUC	BUC	BRN	NOG			41st	1
2008	Team Vitasystems	Maserati MC12 GT1	GT1										ZOL; 8	SAN	41st	1
2009	Vitaphone Racing Team	Maserati MC12 GT1	GT1	SIL	ADR	OSC	SPA; Ret	BUC	ALG	PRI	ZOL				33rd	3

^{†} Not eligible for points

=== Complete Deutsche Tourenwagen Masters results ===
(key) (Races in bold indicate pole position) (Races in italics indicate fastest lap)

Year	Team	Car	1	2	3	4	5	6	7	8	9	10	11	12	13	14	15	16	17	18	19	20	Pos.	Pts
2000	Team Rosberg	AMG-Mercedes CLK-DTM 2000	HOC; 1; 11	HOC; 2 Ret	OSC; 1; 7	OSC; 2; 8	NOR; 1; 9	NOR; 2; 8	SAC; 1 NC	SAC; 2; 12	NÜR; 1; 4	NÜR; 2; 4	LAU; 1 C	LAU; 2 C	OSC; 1 DNS	OSC; 2 DNS	NÜR; 1; 8	NÜR; 2; 13	HOC; 1; 8	HOC; 2; 10			13th	39
2001	Team Rosberg	AMG-Mercedes CLK-DTM 2000	HOC; QR; 4	HOC; CR; 6	NÜR; QR; 5	NÜR; CR; 6	OSC; QR	OSC; CR	SAC; QR	SAC; CR	NOR; QR	NOR; CR	LAU; QR	LAU; CR	NÜR; QR	NÜR; CR	A1R; QR	A1R; CR	ZAN; QR	ZAN; CR	HOC; QR	HOC; CR	17th	12

=== Complete Le Mans Series results ===
Year	Entrant	Class	Car	Engine	1	2	3	4	5	6	Pos.	Pts
2004	Larbre Compétition	GTS	Ferrari 550-GTS Maranello	Ferrari 5.9 V12	MNZ; 1	NÜR; 1	SIL; 1	SPA; 1			1st	35
2005	MenX Racing	GT1	Ferrari 550-GTS Maranello	Ferrari 5.9 V12	SPA	MNZ	SIL	NÜR	IST; 3		23rd	6
2006	Aston Martin Racing Larbre	GT1	Aston Martin DBR9	Aston Martin 6.0 V12	IST; 1	SPA; NC	NÜR; 1	DON; 5	JAR; 2		1st	32
2007	Team Peugeot Total	LMP1	Peugeot 908 HDi FAP	Peugeot HDi 5.5 Turbo V12	MNZ; 3	VAL; 1	NÜR; 1	SPA; 1	SIL; NC	INT; 2	1st	40
2008	Team Peugeot Total	LMP1	Peugeot 908 HDi FAP	Peugeot HDi 5.5 Turbo V12	**CAT**; 8	MNZ; 1	**SPA**; Ret	NÜR; 1	**SIL**; 11		7th	21
2010	Team Peugeot Total	LMP1	Peugeot 908 HDi FAP	Peugeot HDi 5.5 Turbo V12	LEC	**SPA**; 1	ALG	HUN	SIL		21st	18
2011	Peugeot Sport Total	LMP1	Peugeot 908	Peugeot HDi 3.7 Turbo V8	LEC	SPA; 8^{1}	IMO	SIL	EST		NC	0
2011	BMW Motorsport	GTE Pro	BMW M3 GT2	BMW 4.0 V8	LEC	SPA	IMO; 8^{1}	SIL	EST		NC	0

Notes

- **^1** – Lamy competed for the Intercontinental Le Mans Cup, no points awarded for the Le Mans Series.

=== Complete GT1 World Championship results ===
(key) (Races in bold indicate pole position) (Races in italics indicate fastest lap)

Year	Team	Car	1	2	3	4	5	6	7	8	9	10	11	12	13	14	15	16	17	18	19	20	Pos.	Pts
2010	Young Driver AMR	Aston Martin DBR9	ABU; QR	ABU; CR	SIL; QR	SIL; CR	BRN; QR	BRN; CR	PRI; QR	PRI; CR	SPA; QR	SPA; CR	NÜR; QR	NÜR; CR	ALG; QR; 15	ALG; CR; 11	NAV; QR	NAV; CR	INT; QR	INT; CR	SAN; QR	SAN; CR	51st	0

=== Complete FIA World Endurance Championship results ===
(key) (Races in bold indicate pole position) (Races in italics indicate fastest lap)

Year	Entrant	Class	Car	Engine	1	2	3	4	5	6	7	8	9	Rank	Pts
2012	Larbre Compétition	LMGTE Am	Chevrolet Corvette C6.R	Chevrolet 5.5 L V8	SEB; Ret	SPA	LMS; 1	SIL	SÃO	BHR	FUJ; 1	SHA; 1		67th†	2.5
2013	Aston Martin Racing	LMGTE Pro	Aston Martin Vantage GTE	Aston Martin 4.5 L V8	SIL; 3	SPA; 6	LMS; Ret	**SÃO**; 11	COA; Ret	FUJ; 13	SHA; 2	BHR; Ret		11th	42.75
2014	Aston Martin Racing	LMGTE Am	Aston Martin Vantage GTE	Aston Martin 4.5 L V8	SIL; 2	SPA; 3	LMS; 5	COA; 1	**FUJ**; 2	**SHA**; 1	BHR; 3	**SÃO**; 1		2nd	164
2015	Aston Martin Racing	LMGTE Am	Aston Martin Vantage GTE	Aston Martin 4.5 L V8	**SIL**; 1	**SPA**; 1	**LMS**; NC	NÜR; 2	COA; 5	FUJ; 2	**SHA**; 2	**BHR**; 1		3rd	144
2016	Aston Martin Racing	LMGTE Am	Aston Martin Vantage GTE	Aston Martin 4.5 L V8	SIL; 2	**SPA**; 1	**LMS**; Ret	NÜR; 1	MEX; Ret	**COA**; 1	**FUJ**; 1	**SHA**; 1	**BHR**; Ret	3rd	149
2017	Aston Martin Racing	LMGTE Am	Aston Martin Vantage GTE	Aston Martin 4.5 L V8	**SIL**; 2	**SPA**; 1	**LMS**; 4	**NÜR**; 3	MEX; 2	**COA**; 1	FUJ; 5	**SHA**; 1	**BHR**; 1	1st	192
2018–19	Aston Martin Racing	LMGTE Am	Aston Martin Vantage GTE	Aston Martin 4.5 L V8	SPA; 1	LMS; Ret	SIL; 4	**FUJ**; 3	**SHA**; 5	SEB; 8	SPA; 6	LMS; Ret		8th	77
2019–20	Aston Martin Racing	LMGTE Am	Aston Martin Vantage AMR	Aston Martin 4.0 L Turbo V8	SIL	FUJ	SHA	BHR	COA	SPA	LMS	**BHR**; 9		33rd	4

^{†} Rank indicates standings in Drivers' World Championship.

=== Complete WeatherTech SportsCar Championship results ===
(key) (Races in bold indicate pole position) (Races in italics indicate fastest lap)

Year	Team	Class	Make	Engine	1	2	3	4	5	6	7	8	9	10	11	12	Pos.	Points	Ref
2014	Aston Martin Racing	GTLM	Aston Martin Vantage GTE	Aston Martin 4.5 V8	DAY; 8	SEB	LBH	LGA	WGL	MOS	IMS	ELK	VIR	COA	PET		40th	24	
2015	Aston Martin Racing	GTLM	Aston Martin Vantage GTE	Aston Martin 4.5 V8	DAY; 6	SEB; 6	LBH	LGA	WGL	MOS	ELK	VIR	COA	PET			19th	52	
2016	Aston Martin Racing	GTD	Aston Martin Vantage GT3	Aston Martin 6.0 V12	DAY; 4	SEB; 10	LGA	DET	WGL	MOS	LIM	ELK	VIR	COA	PET		28th	51	
2017	Aston Martin Racing	GTD	Aston Martin Vantage GT3	Aston Martin 6.0 V12	DAY; 12	SEB	LBH	COA	DET	WGL	MOS	LIM	ELK	VIR	LGA	PET	69th	19	
2018	Spirit of Race	GTD	Ferrari 488 GT3	Ferrari F154CB 3.9 Turbo V8	**DAY**; 21	**SEB**; 12	MDO	DET	WGL	MOS	LIM	ELK	VIR	LGA	PET		48th	29	
2019	Spirit of Race	GTD	Ferrari 488 GT3	Ferrari F154CB 3.9 Turbo V8	DAY; 20	SEB	MDO	DET	WGL	MOS	LIM	ELK	VIR	LGA	PET		67th	11	
2020	Aston Martin Racing	GTD	Aston Martin Vantage AMR GT3	Aston Martin 4.0 L Turbo V8	DAY; 17	DAY	SEB	ELK	VIR	ATL	MDO	CLT	PET	LGA	SEB		58th	14	

Sporting positions
Preceded by David Coulthard	Masters of Formula 3 Winner; 1992	Succeeded by Jos Verstappen
Preceded by Tom Kristensen	German Formula Three Champion; 1992	Succeeded by Jos Verstappen
Preceded by Justin Bell	FIA GT Championship; GT2 Champion; 1998; With: Olivier Beretta	Succeeded by Mike Rockenfeller; Marc Lieb (2005)
Preceded by Johnny Cecotto	V8Star Series; Champion; 2003	Succeeded by None (Series ended)
Preceded by Inaugural	Le Mans Endurance Series; LMGTS Champion; 2004; With: Christophe Bouchut & Steve Zacchia	Succeeded by Christian Pescatori; Michele Bartyan; Toni Seiler (LMGT1)
Preceded by Christian Pescatori; Michele Bartyan; Toni Seiler	Le Mans Series; LMGT1 Champion; 2006; With: Gabriele Gardel & Vincent Vosse	Succeeded by Soheil Ayari; Stéphane Ortelli
Preceded by Jean-Christophe Boullion; Emmanuel Collard	Le Mans Series; Champion; 2007; With: Stéphane Sarrazin	Succeeded by Alexandre Prémat; Mike Rockenfeller
Preceded by Emmanuel Collard; François Perrodo; Rui Águas	FIA Endurance Trophy for LMGTE Am Drivers; 2017; With: Mathias Lauda & Paul Dalla Lana	Succeeded by Jörg Bergmeister; Patrick Lindsey; Egidio Perfetti
