= Minardi M194 =

Formula One racing car

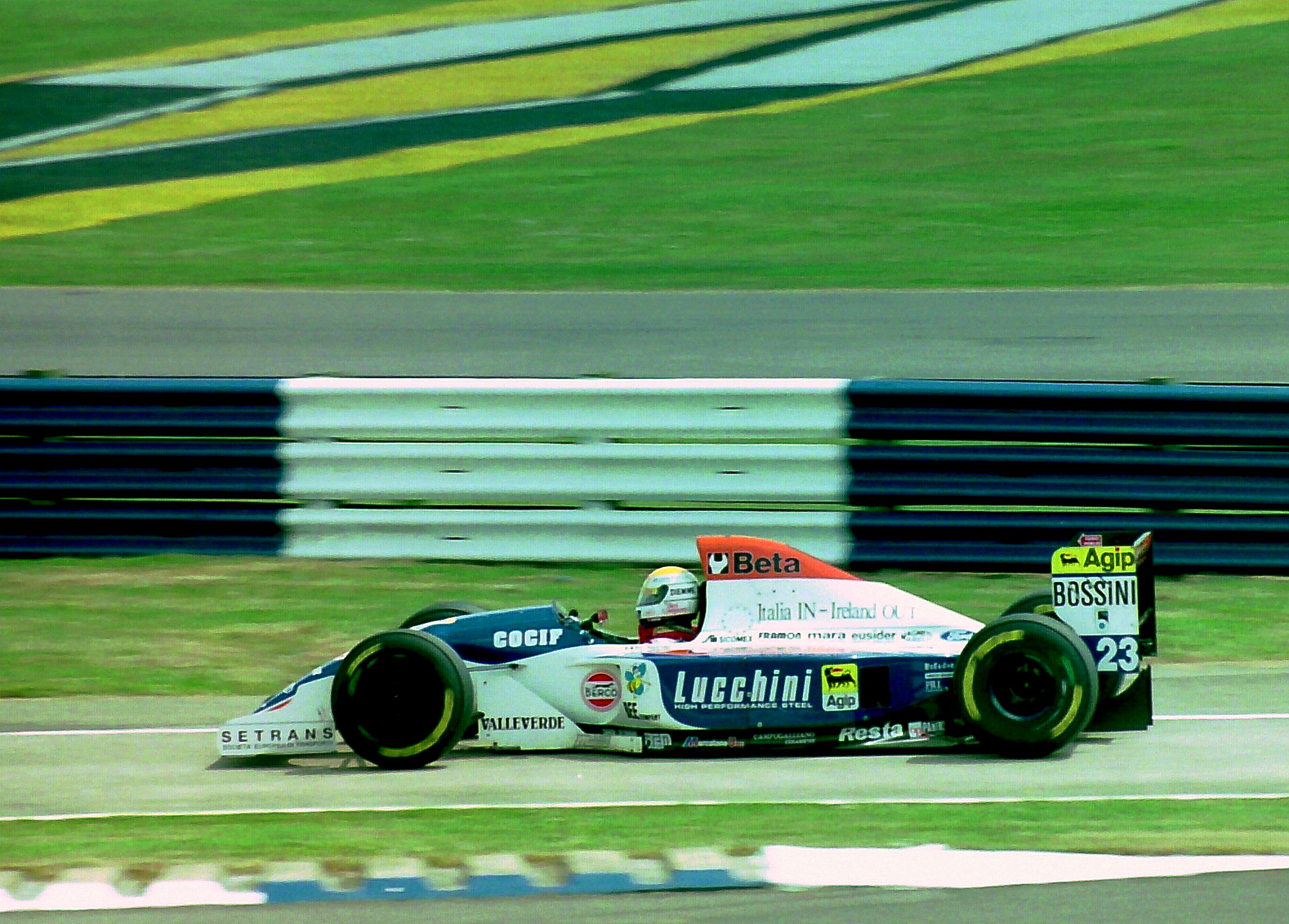
- Category: Formula One
- Constructor: Minardi
- Designers: Aldo Costa (Technical Director); Mauro Gennaro (Chief Designer); Rene Hilhorst (Chief Aerodynamicist)
- Predecessor: M193
- Successor: M195

Technical specifications
- Chassis: Carbon fibre monocoque
- Engine: Ford HBC7 / Ford HBC8, 3,494 cc (213.2 cu in), 75° V8, NA, mid-engine, longitudinally mounted
- Transmission: Minardi / XTrac T 6-speed semi-automatic
- Fuel: Agip
- Tyres: Goodyear

Competition history
- Notable entrants: Minardi Scuderia Italia
- Notable drivers: 23. (Italy) Pierluigi Martini; 24. (Italy) Michele Alboreto
- Debut: 1994 Canadian Grand Prix
Races	Wins	Podiums	Poles	F/Laps
11	0	0	0	0
- Constructors' Championships: 0
- Drivers' Championships: 0

The Minardi M194 was a Formula One car designed by Aldo Costa and Gustav Brunner and built by Minardi for the 1994 season. It was introduced at that year's Canadian Grand Prix to replace the Minardi M193B. The car was again powered by the Ford HBD V8 engine.

Minardi team drivers during 1994 were Pierluigi Martini and former Grand Prix winner Michele Alboreto. The team's test driver was Luca Badoer.

The M194 would only score two points during its 11 races, both when Martini finished in 5th place at the car's second race, the French Grand Prix. The team in fact scored more points in 1994 (3 points) using the M193B than with the M194. The combined 5 point total saw Minardi only finish tenth in the Constructors' Championship.

The M194 was replaced for the 1995 season by the Minardi M195. Alboreto retired and was replaced by test driver Badoer.

== Livery ==
The M194 had a blue, orange and white livery, with main sponsorship from Lucchini and Beta Tools.

During the British Grand Prix, the car ran with the words "Italia IN - Ireland OUT", in response to the elimination of Ireland from the 1994 FIFA World Cup and the provocation from Eddie Jordan in the previous race.

== Race results ==
(key)

Year	Team	Engine	Tyres	Drivers	1	2	3	4	5	6	7	8	9	10	11	12	13	14	15	16	Pts.	WCC
1994	Minardi	Ford HBD; V8	G		BRA	PAC	SMR	MON	ESP	CAN	FRA	GBR	GER	HUN	BEL	ITA	POR	EUR	JPN	AUS	5*	10th
1994	Minardi	Ford HBD; V8	G	Pierluigi Martini						9	5	10	Ret	Ret	8	Ret	12	15	Ret	9	5*	10th
1994	Minardi	Ford HBD; V8	G	Michele Alboreto						11	Ret	Ret	Ret	7	9	Ret	13	14	Ret	Ret	5*	10th

* 3 points scored using Minardi M193B
