= Minardi M193 =

Formula One racing car

Minardi M193 Minardi M193B
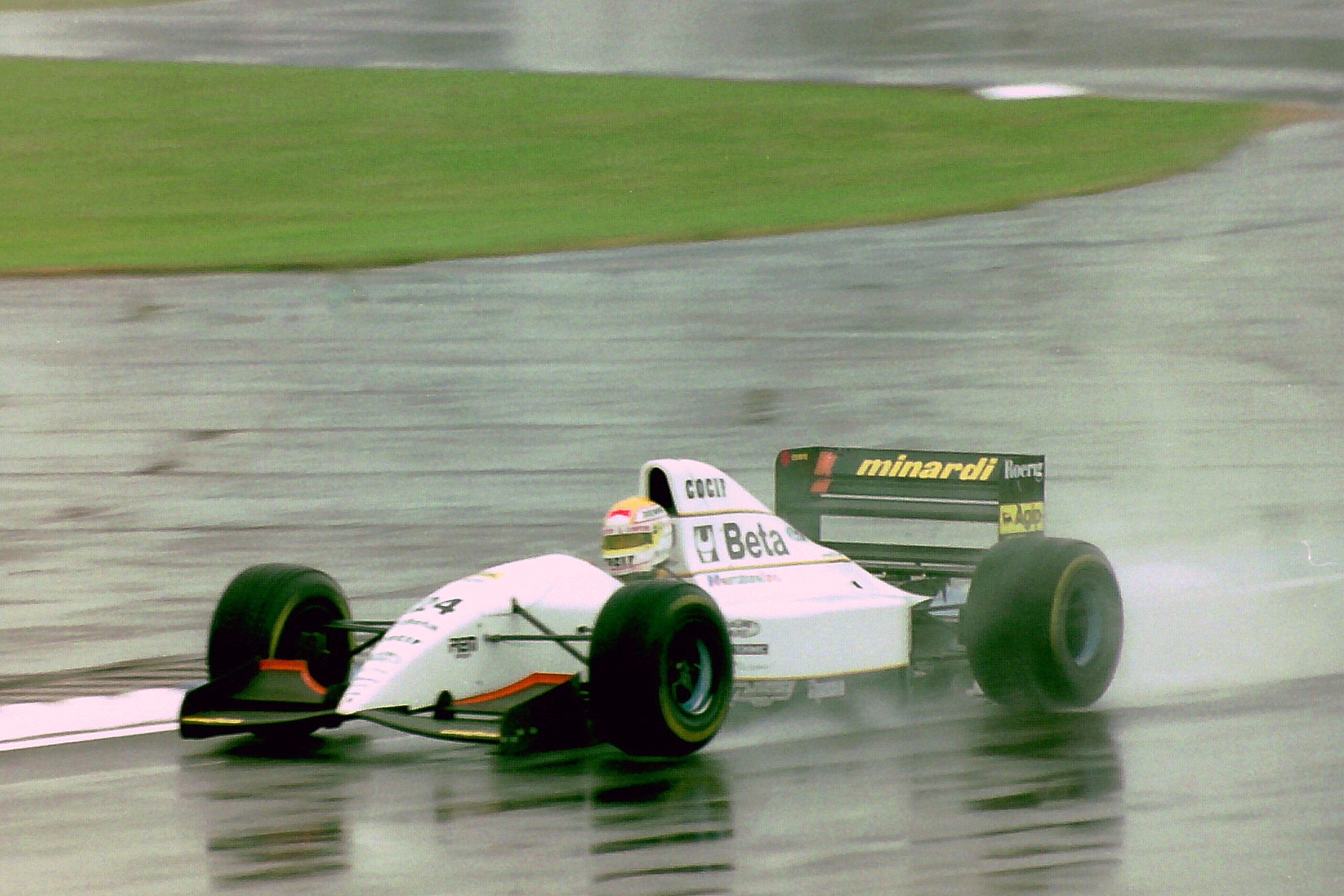
- Category: Formula One
- Constructor: Minardi
- Designers: Aldo Costa (Technical Director); Gustav Brunner (Chief Designer); Rene Hilhorst (Chief Aerodynamicist)
- Predecessor: M192
- Successor: M194

Technical specifications
- Chassis: Carbon fibre monocoque
- Suspension (front): Double wishbones
- Suspension (rear): Double wishbones
- Axle track: Front: 1,678 mm (66.1 in); Rear: 1,600 mm (63 in)
- Wheelbase: 2,806 mm (110.5 in)
- Engine: Ford HBD6, 3,494 cc (213.2 cu in), 75° V8, NA, mid-engine, longitudinally mounted
- Transmission: Manual 6-speed semi-automatic
- Weight: 505 kg (1,113 lb)
- Fuel: Agip
- Tyres: Goodyear

Competition history
- Notable entrants: Minardi Team
- Notable drivers: (Brazil) Christian Fittipaldi (France) Jean-Marc Gounon (Italy) Fabrizio Barbazza (Italy) Pierluigi Martini (Italy) Michele Alboreto
- Debut: 1993 South African Grand Prix
Races	Wins	Podiums	Poles	F/Laps
21	0	0	0	0
- Constructors' Championships: 0
- Drivers' Championships: 0

The Minardi M193 was a Formula One car designed by Aldo Costa and Gustav Brunner and built by Minardi for the 1993 Formula One season. Drivers of the car included Christian Fittipaldi (who flipped his car when he collided with teammate Pierluigi Martini at the finish of the Italian Grand Prix), Martini and former Ferrari driver and 5 time grand prix winner Michele Alboreto. Using the M193, Minardi scored 7 points to finish 8th in the 1993 Constructors' Championship.

== Minardi M193B ==
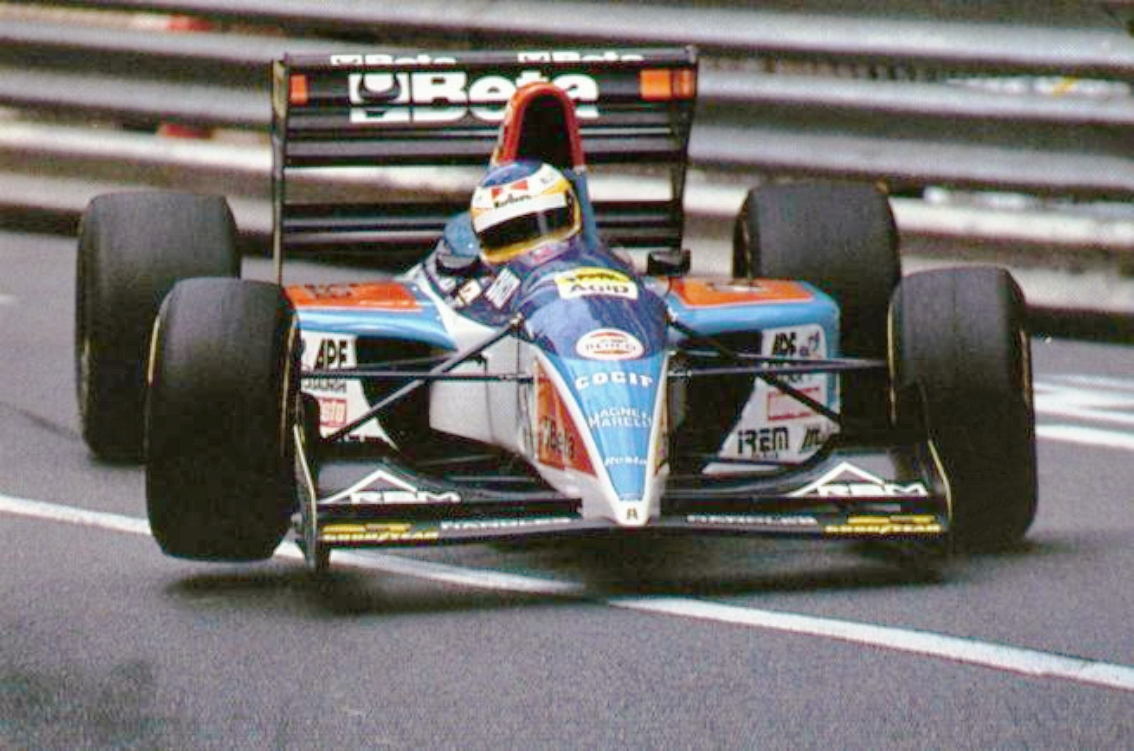
Michele Alboreto at the 1994 Monaco Grand Prix with the M193B.

An updated version of the car, the M193B, was used for the 1994 season, until the 1994 Canadian Grand Prix, when the Minardi M194 was introduced. Pierluigi Martini and Michele Alboreto were retained for the season but between them could only score 5 points for 10th in the Constructors' Championship.

== Livery ==
The M193 had a major change in its colour scheme, compared to its predecessor. The predominantly black paintjob was replaced by a white car with minor black and yellow painting on the front and rear wings. New driver Fabrizio Barbazza brought along the Italian company Beta Tools as Minardi's main sponsor.

The 1994 livery reflected the team's merger with Scuderia Italia. Light blue and orange became the car's primary colour scheme, due to sponsorship from Lucchini and Beta Tools, respectively.

== Race results ==
(key)

Year	Team	Chassis	Engine	Tyres	Drivers	1	2	3	4	5	6	7	8	9	10	11	12	13	14	15	16	Pts.	WCC
1993	Minardi	M193	Ford HBD; V8	G		RSA	BRA	EUR	SMR	ESP	MON	CAN	FRA	GBR	GER	HUN	BEL	ITA	POR	JPN	AUS	7	8th
1993	Minardi	M193	Ford HBD; V8	G	Christian Fittipaldi	4	Ret	7	Ret	8	5	9	8	12	11	Ret	Ret	8	9			7	8th
1993	Minardi	M193	Ford HBD; V8	G	Fabrizio Barbazza	Ret	Ret	6	6	Ret	11	Ret	Ret									7	8th
1993	Minardi	M193	Ford HBD; V8	G	Pierluigi Martini									Ret	14	Ret	Ret	7	8	10	Ret	7	8th
1993	Minardi	M193	Ford HBD; V8	G	Jean-Marc Gounon															Ret	Ret	7	8th
1994	Minardi	M193B	Ford HBD; V8	G		BRA	PAC	SMR	MON	ESP	CAN	FRA	GBR	GER	HUN	BEL	ITA	POR	EUR	JPN	AUS	5*	10th
1994	Minardi	M193B	Ford HBD; V8	G	Pierluigi Martini	8	Ret	Ret	Ret	5												5*	10th
1994	Minardi	M193B	Ford HBD; V8	G	Michele Alboreto	Ret	Ret	Ret	6	Ret												5*	10th

* 2 points scored in 1994 using Minardi M194
