= Mercedes AMG F1 W10 EQ Power+ =

2019 Formula One racing car

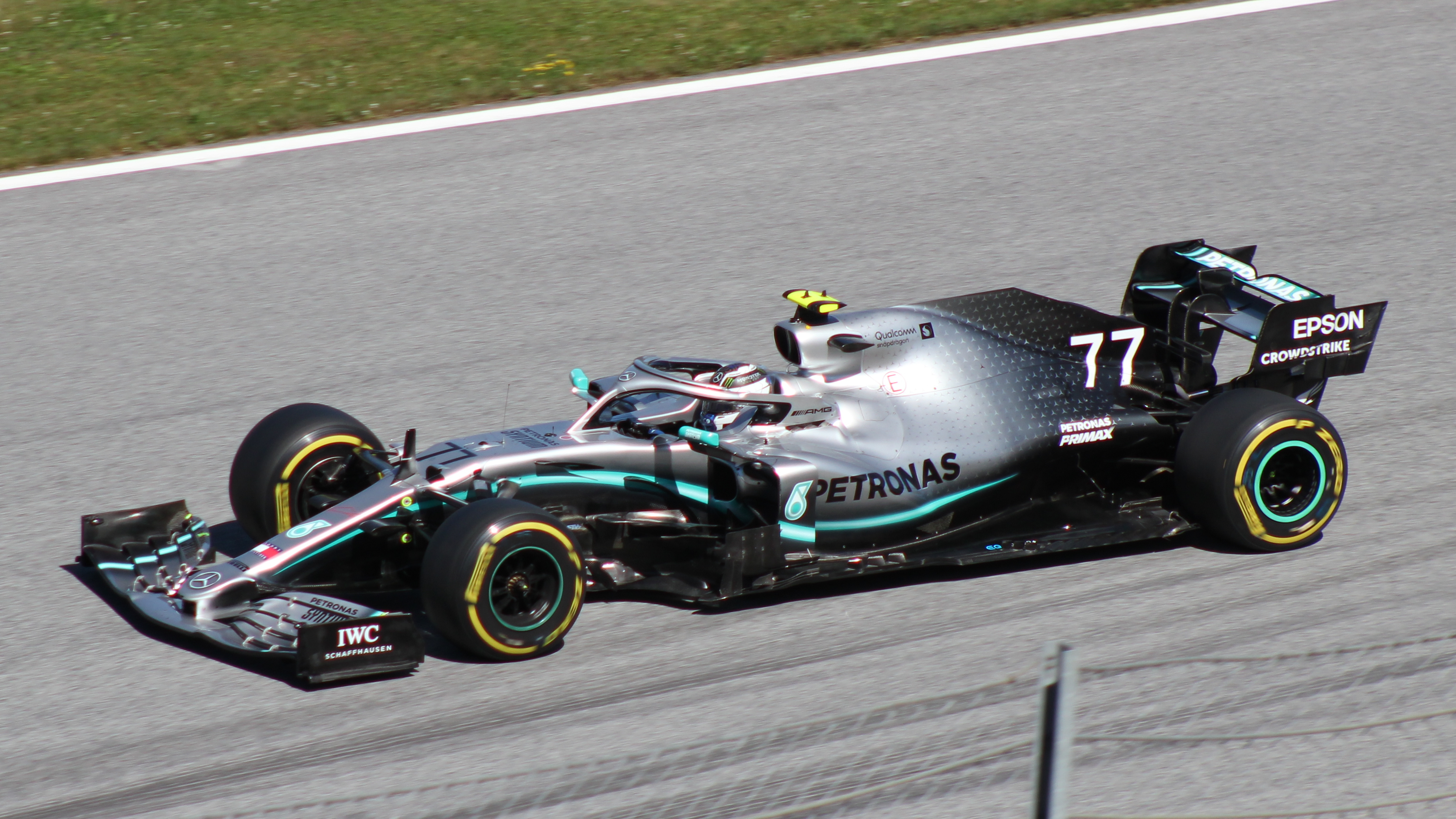
- The Mercedes AMG F1 W10 EQ Power+, driven by Valtteri Bottas during the Austrian Grand Prix
- Category: Formula One
- Constructor: Mercedes
- Designers: James Allison (Technical Director); John Owen (Chief Designer); Mike Elliott (Technology Director); Loïc Serra (Performance Director); Ashley Way (Deputy Chief Designer); Emiliano Giangiulio (Head of Vehicle Performance); Jarrod Murphy (Head of Aerodynamics); Eric Blandin (Chief Aerodynamicist); Aldo Costa (Technical Consultant); Andy Cowell (Managing Director - Power Unit); Hywel Thomas (Engineering Director - Power Unit)
- Predecessor: Mercedes AMG F1 W09 EQ Power+
- Successor: Mercedes-AMG F1 W11 EQ Performance

Technical specifications
- Chassis: Moulded carbon fibre and honeycomb composite structure
- Suspension (front): Carbon fibre wishbone and pushrod activated torsion springs and rockers
- Suspension (rear): Carbon fibre wishbone and pullrod activated torsion springs and rockers
- Width: 2,000 mm (79 in)
- Height: 950 mm (37 in)
- Wheelbase: 3,726 mm (146.7 in)
- Engine: Mercedes-AMG F1 M10 EQ Power+, 1.6 L (98 cu in), 90° - V6 turbocharged engine, limited to 15,000 RPM, in a mid-mounted, rear-wheel drive layout
- Electric motor: Motor Generator Unit–Kinetic (MGU-K), Motor Generator Unit–Heat (MGU-H)
- Transmission: Mercedes co-developed with Xtrac semi-automatic seamless shift sequential gearbox with 8 forward and 1 reverse gear
- Battery: Mercedes lithium-ion battery solution
- Power: 1,000 horsepower (750 kW)
- Weight: 743 kg (1,638.0 lb)
- Fuel: Petronas Primax
- Lubricants: Petronas Syntium & Tutela
- Brakes: Carbone Industrie carbon brake discs, pads and Brembo brake calipers with rear brake-by-wire
- Tyres: Pirelli P Zero (Dry/Slick); Pirelli Cinturato (Wet/Treaded); OZ forged magnesium wheels: 13"
- Clutch: ZF carbon fibre reinforced carbon plate

Competition history
- Notable entrants: Mercedes AMG Petronas Motorsport
- Notable drivers: 44. (United Kingdom) Lewis Hamilton; 77. (Finland) Valtteri Bottas
- Debut: 2019 Australian Grand Prix
- First win: 2019 Australian Grand Prix
- Last win: 2019 Abu Dhabi Grand Prix
- Last event: 2019 Abu Dhabi Grand Prix
Races	Wins	Podiums	Poles	F/Laps
21	15	32	10	9
- Constructors' Championships: 1 (2019)
- Drivers' Championships: 1 (Lewis Hamilton, 2019)

The Mercedes AMG F1 W10 EQ Power+ (commonly abbreviated as the Mercedes W10) is a championship-winning Formula One racing car designed and developed by Mercedes-Benz under the direction of James Allison, John Owen, Mike Elliott, Loïc Serra, Ashley Way, Emiliano Giangiulio, Jarrod Murphy, Eric Blandin and Aldo Costa, to compete during the 2019 Formula One World Championship. The car was driven by Lewis Hamilton, and Valtteri Bottas, both of whom remained with the team for a seventh and a third season, respectively. The team's reserve driver was Esteban Ocon, coming from Force India.

The car is the successor of the Mercedes AMG F1 W09 EQ Power+, continuing the approach with increasing the exposure of Mercedes's electric road car models, whilst AMG was included to reflect the relationship between Mercedes-AMG and Mercedes-Benz. The chassis also continued its numbering as F1 W10 to represent the tenth Formula One car that Mercedes had constructed since 2010. The car made its competitive début at the 2019 Australian Grand Prix, the opening round of the 2019 season.

The F1 W10 EQ Power+ took 15 wins (eleven for Hamilton and four for Bottas), ten pole positions (five for Hamilton and five for Bottas), nine fastest laps (six for Hamilton and three for Bottas), seven front-row lockouts and nine 1–2 finishes. The car also took Mercedes to a record-equalling sixth consecutive Constructors' Championship, a feat only previously achieved by Scuderia Ferrari between 1999 and 2004, and Hamilton to his sixth Drivers' Championship.

== Launch and pre-season testing ==
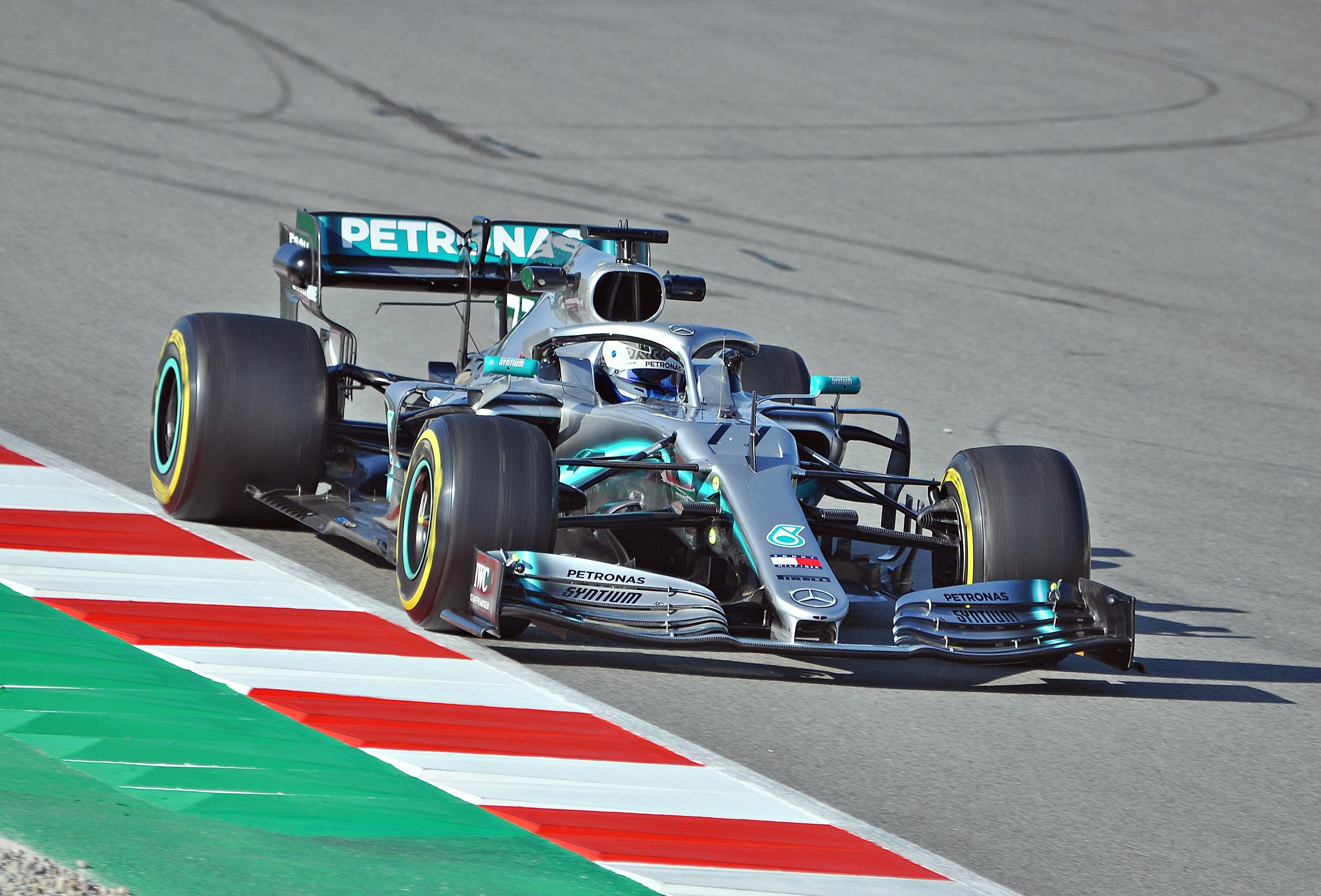
Bottas driving the W10 during the pre-season testing

The Mercedes AMG F1 W10 EQ Power+ was unofficially unveiled at the Silverstone Circuit with Hamilton and Bottas completing an inaugural shakedown on 13 February 2019. The car took part the pre-season testing at Circuit de Barcelona-Catalunya on 18 February – 21 February and 26 February – 1 March. During the eight testing days, the car completed 1189 laps; a total of 5,535 km (3,439 mi), equivalent to over 18 race distances. The car was also driven by Williams's regular driver George Russell and 2018 GP3 Series Drivers' Champion runner up - Nikita Mazepin during in-season testing.

== Design and development ==
As Mercedes's first attempt at the new 2019-20 regulations, the team ran two distinct aerodynamic packages during pre-season testing: one each with 'inboard' and 'outboard' front wing philosophy. The latter also received significantly revised nose, bargeboards, floor, and engine cover, before being chosen as the package the team would race in the 2019 season. Both were informally referred to as the 'A'-spec and 'B'-spec W10 in the media and among the teams, respectively.

The car performed well in the first five rounds of the season, where it was renowned for its newly acquired slow- and medium-speed corner strength, in contrast to its predecessor. Often compared to Ferrari, whose car featured straight-line speed, low drag, and high-speed prowess, its victories were often attributed to the ease in working the new Pirelli tire concept with its overwhelming downforce. The Mercedes car received its first major upgrade in Spain, where it followed up a front wing update in China with a redesign of the bargeboards "boomerang".

A major weakness was first observed and uncovered in Austria, when team members remarked on the inability of the car's deliberately tight cooling to operate optimally under high-altitude and hot temperature conditions. It received another major upgrade in Germany, where the team revised the car's rear-facing cooling outlets, sidepod vanes, bargeboards, and a new rear wing endplate design, (among other changes). Mercedes continued to race this package in the following rounds, with appropriate low-drag modifications in Belgium and Italy.

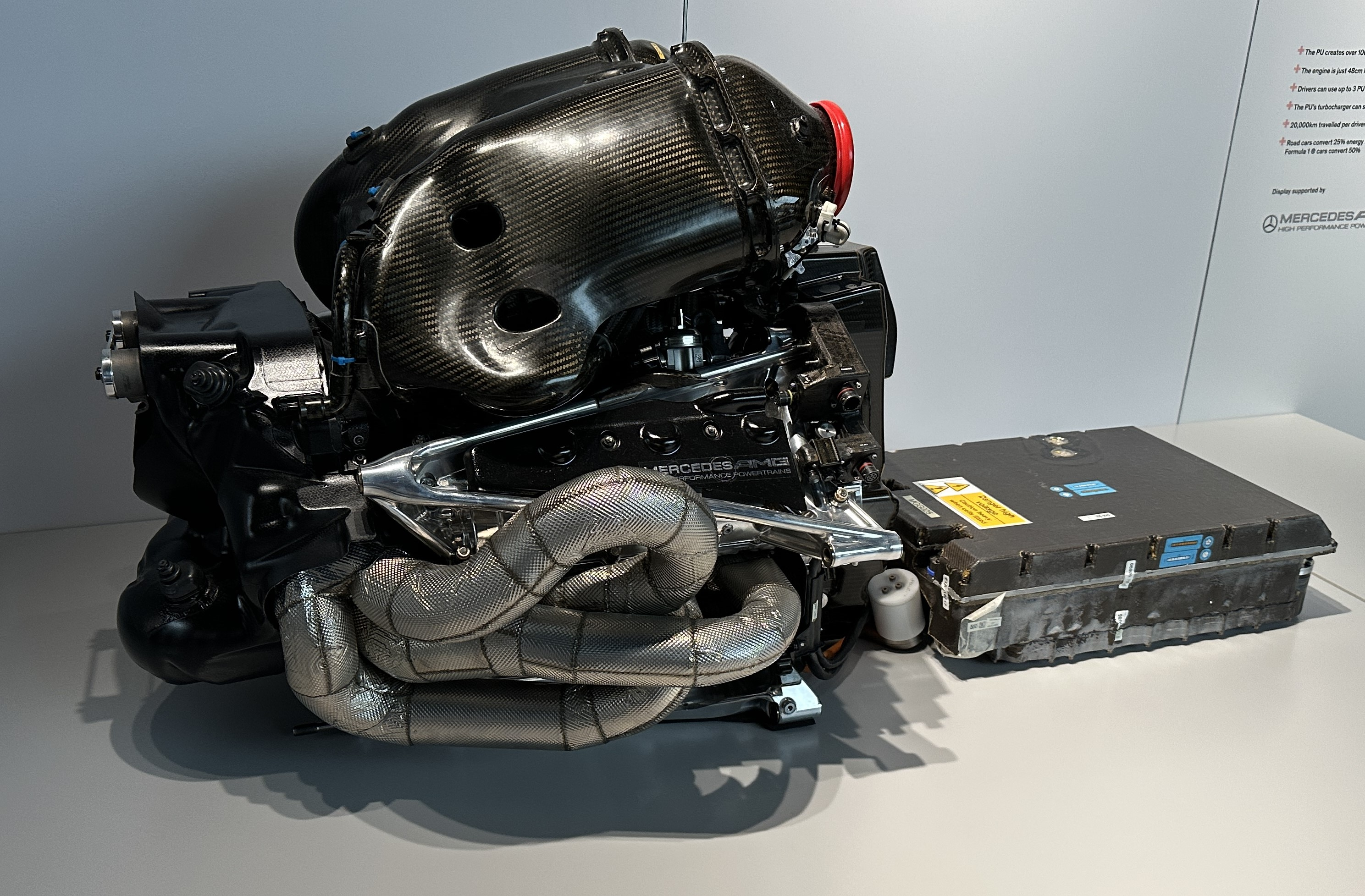
The ICE component of the M10 power unit, displayed with its energy storage unit

The new-for-2019 power unit, Mercedes-AMG F1 M10 EQ Power+, was said to be less powerful than Ferrari's (the Ferrari 064) - specifically in terms of outright qualifying power modes, straight line speed, and electrical power development. Despite this, it was still considered the most fuel-efficient power unit in the field, although there were, however, some reliability concerns when the third iteration of the engine (Phase 3) experienced significant failures in the 2019 Belgian and Italian Grands Prix.

Mercedes introduced a raft of updates in Japan for the front wing, sidepod deflectors, and floor, aimed to increase efficiency against Ferrari's straight-line speed and Red Bull's overall downforce balance. This was noted to be the final updates of the season as Mercedes shifted focus to 2020, and while it did improve their competitiveness in the final rounds of the year, it was not a substantial increase in speed and its impact was masked by the extreme natures of the tracks and races in that part of the year. Mercedes took pole in only 2 races (United States and Abu Dhabi) after this upgrade's introduction, and won 4 races (Japan, United States, Mexico, and Abu Dhabi), two of which after starting from behind their rivals.

== Season summary ==
=== Opening rounds ===
Ahead of the Australian Grand Prix, Ferrari - which shone during pre-season testing - were considered as the favourites for the first race of the season. However, Mercedes had a strong start and Hamilton topped the time sheets in all free practice sessions. During qualifying, Mercedes struck the first major blow in 2019. Hamilton took pole from Bottas and was a full 0.7s up from the third-placed Ferrari of Vettel. Hamilton clocked a new lap record of Albert Park with a 1m 20.486s and achieved his sixth consecutive pole at the circuit, and a record-equalling eighth at the Australian Grand Prix. On Sunday, the team converted their front-row lockout into a 1–2. Bottas enjoyed a sensational start to his year. The Finn passed Hamilton at the start and went on to score a dominant win, leading home his teammate and Verstappen with a lead of over 20 seconds. Bottas also claimed a bonus point for the fastest lap of the race, giving him a full 26 points.

At the next round in Bahrain, Mercedes did not top any of the timing sheets in the free practice sessions and both cars qualified on the second row behind both Ferraris, with Hamilton in third and Bottas in fourth. On race day, Vettel won the start ahead of Bottas who got past the struggling polesitter Leclerc and Hamilton. However, Bottas made a mistake on his second lap which dropped him behind Leclerc and Hamilton once more. During the first round of pitstops, Hamilton got the jump on Vettel after a well executed undercut. Yet, the German managed to overtake Hamilton soon after due to suffering from a lack of grip on his soft tyres. Hamilton became much more competitive after fitting on the medium tyres during his second stop. Subsequently, the Briton overtook Vettel on the outside of turn 4 on lap 38. Meanwhile, Vettel got caught out by the overtake and spun on his own. He was forced to pit which allowed Bottas into P3. More misfortune hit Ferrari a couple of laps later as Leclerc reported an engine issue with his car. Both Mercedes drivers overtook his wounded Ferrari and Hamilton led home a surprising second consecutive 1–2 finish for Mercedes.

Arriving at the 1000th Formula 1 Grand Prix in China, Mercedes proved to be the team to beat. On Saturday, the Silver Arrows achieved their second front-row lockout of the season. Bottas managed to take pole, edging his teammate by just 0.023s, with the Ferraris of Vettel and Leclerc around three tenths adrift. At the start of the race, Hamilton managed to overtake Bottas. He went on to lead every lap and won the race in a convincing fashion. Bottas finished in second place and helped Mercedes secure a third consecutive 1–2. The result gave Mercedes a perfect start to the season. The last team to score three one-two finishes at the start of a season was Williams in 1992.

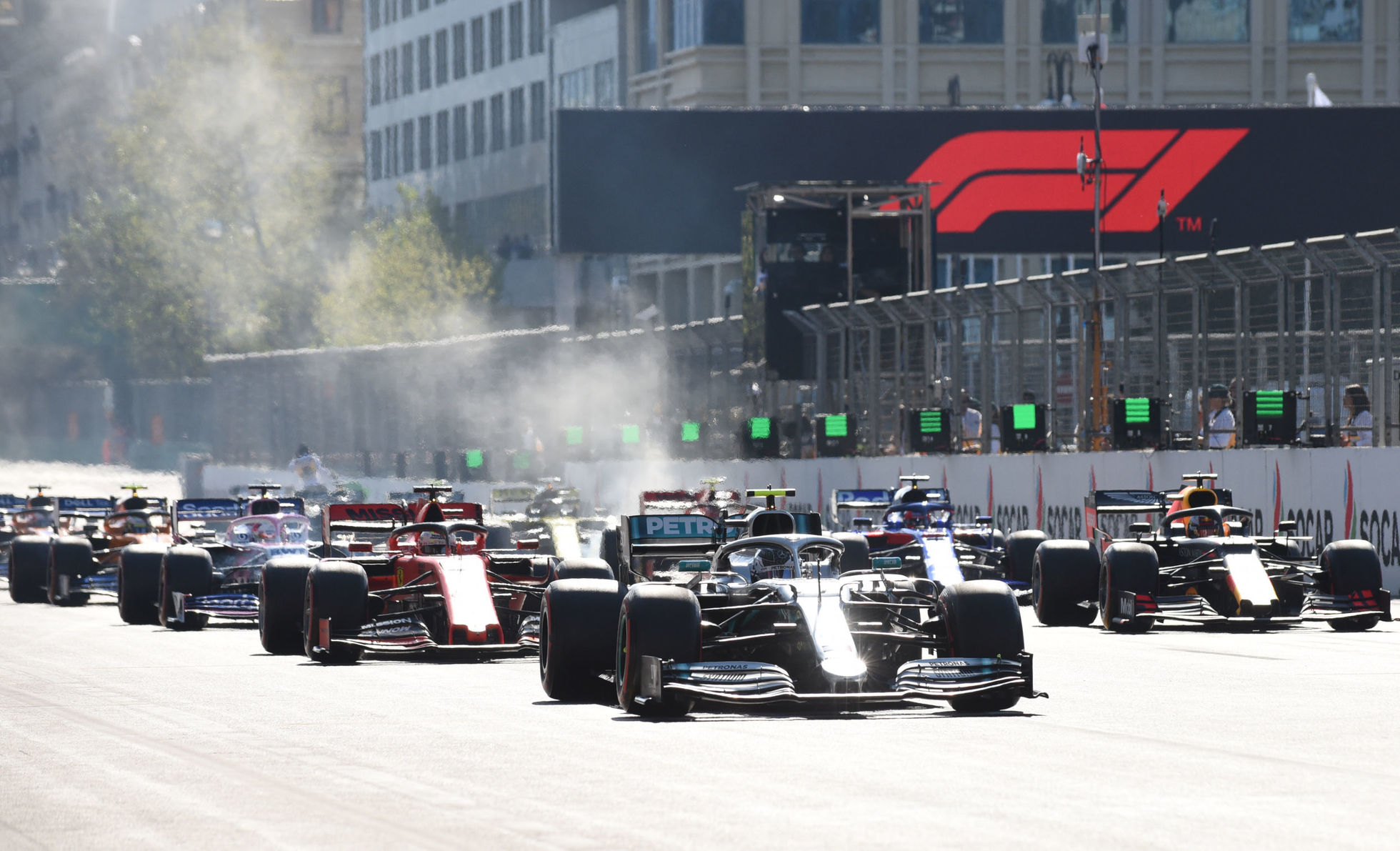
Bottas led the Azerbaijan Grand Prix from pole position and setting a record of four consecutive 1-2 finishes since the start of the season.

At the Azerbaijan Grand Prix, Ferrari set a blistering pace during the free practice sessions which Mercedes seemed unable to match. Therefore, Leclerc was considered as a strong favourite for pole. However, a big crash for Leclerc in Q2 saw him ruled out of contention and Mercedes took advantage of the situation. A drop in temperatures - due to a delay of the session from Kubica's and Leclerc's crashes at the castle section - and good tows during the final run in Q3 allowed Mercedes to grab an unlikely front-row lockout, their third of the season. Bottas claimed his second consecutive pole, edging out Hamilton by just 0.059s. On Sunday, Bottas was able to keep his lead at the start and went on to enjoy a lights-to-flag victory. Hamilton put him under pressure during the race but he was unable to make a move on the Finn. His P2 finish gave the team a fourth consecutive one-two of the season. Once again, Mercedes defeated Ferrari at a track where, up until Leclerc's crash in Q2, pole and victory for the Scuderia had seemed assured. Furthermore, the result gave Mercedes a new record for most one-two finishes at the start of a season, beating Williams' record of three from 1992.

=== European and Canadian rounds ===
During qualifying of the Spanish Grand Prix, Mercedes achieved their fourth front-row lockout of the season. Bottas secured his third consecutive pole. He set a new track record at Catalunya of a 1:15.406, beating his teammate by over six tenths. Vettel in P3 was a further 2 tenths behind. On race day, Hamilton won the start and went on to win his third consecutive Spanish Grand Prix while leading every lap of the race. He also won the additional point for the fastest lap of the race, giving him a full 26 points. Bottas in P2 completed a fifth consecutive 1-2 finish for the team, a feat the team hadn't achieved since having five 1-2 finishes between the 2015 United States Grand Prix and the 2016 Australian Grand Prix.

With the W10 being very strong in the slow corners, Mercedes came to Monaco as favourites. During qualifying, Mercedes justified their status as the team to beat. Hamilton took pole position in a last lap effort while setting a new track record of 1:10.166 s, beating Bottas by less than a tenth of a second. It was the fifth front-row lockout of the season. Hamilton and Bottas led from the start until debris from Leclerc's car brought out an early safety car on lap 11. Hamilton pitted for medium tyres and managed to stay ahead. However, Bottas collided with Max Verstappen in the pit lane after an unsafe release from Red Bull. This caused a slow puncture meaning that Bottas had to pit for a second time which left him in fourth position. Of the front runners, only Hamilton was on the mediums while Verstappen, Vettel and Bottas who were directly behind him were on the hard compound. A 5-second penalty for his unsafe release made Verstappen push for the lead. In contrast, Hamilton needed to preserve the tyre life of his mediums. As the race came toward the end, Hamilton held onto a narrow lead with a "dead" front left tyre. On lap 76, Verstappen made his one serious move on the Briton, launching himself down the inside of Hamilton into the Nouvelle Chicane. Hamilton shut the door, with Verstappen's front right making light contact with Hamilton's rear left. After that tense move, Hamilton went on to win the race which he later described as "probably the hardest race" he'd had. Verstappen was relegated to fourth position due to his penalty, moving Bottas into third. While Mercedes failed to score a sixth consecutive 1–2, the team still managed to score another double-podium finish.

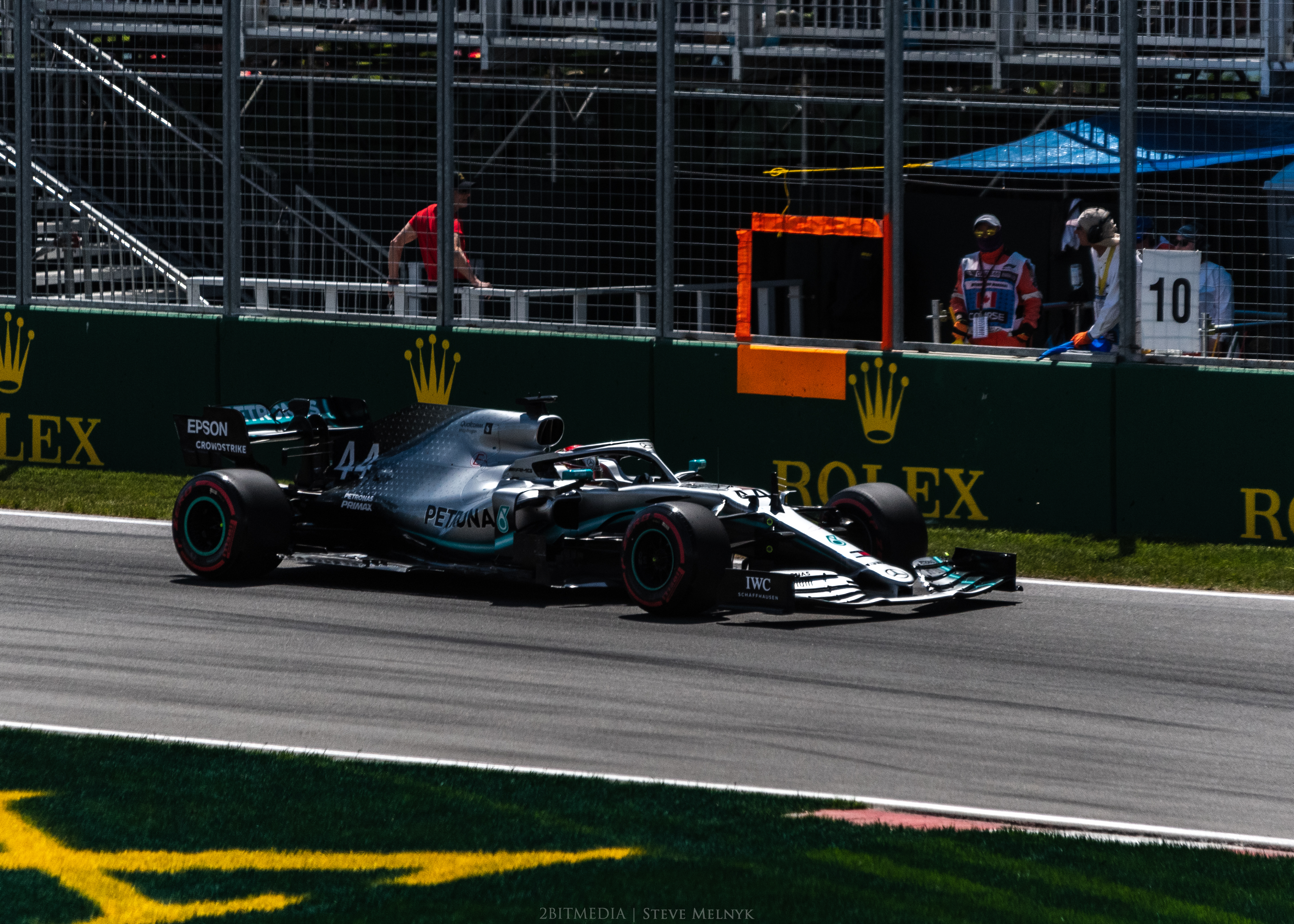
Hamilton during the Canadian Grand Prix, taking his fifth victory of the season

Mercedes had a difficult start to the weekend in Canada. First, Bottas suffered from a fuel pressure issue in FP1. Then, Hamilton hit the wall at turn 9 in FP2, cutting short his practice time by over an hour. During qualifying, Vettel took pole with an impressive lap while Hamilton managed to split the two Ferraris. Meanwhile, Bottas suffered a spin on his first push lap, barely avoiding contact with the walls. Unable to find a rhythm, his second effort was riddled with several mistakes and he only managed to qualify in sixth position, behind Ricciardo and Gasly. On Sunday morning, Mercedes was faced with more unreliability issues, as the team found a hydraulic leak on Hamilton's car which they could repair in time. Vettel won the start from Hamilton while Bottas moved up into fourth position as the race went on. On lap 48, Hamilton pressured Vettel into a mistake. The German ran onto the grass at the Turn 3-4 chicane and squeezed Hamilton when he re-joined the track. The stewards punished Vettel by giving him a five-second race penalty for re-joining unsafely and forcing another car off track. Afterwards, Hamilton stayed within those five seconds until the end. He took a record-equalling seventh victory at the Canadian Grand Prix to match Schumacher's record in Montreal. Bottas finished in P4 and secured the additional point for fastest lap after having pitted for a set of soft tyres shortly before the end of the Grand Prix.

Coming to France, Mercedes had the measure of Ferrari across practice and qualifying and secured their sixth front-row lockout of the season during qualifying. Hamilton delivered the fastest lap in the third part of qualifying to secure his third pole position of the season. He set a new track record and beat his teammate by over 2 tenths of a second with the next car a further 0.3 seconds back. Mercedes dominated the race on Sunday. Hamilton took a commanding lights-to-flag victory, crossing the line 18 seconds clear of his Finnish teammate. It was Mercedes' eighth successive victory of 2019 and their sixth one-two finish of the season.

Mercedes had a difficult qualifying session in Austria. Initially, Hamilton managed to take P2 with a great last lap effort to slot in behind Leclerc while Bottas had to settle for P4 behind Verstappen. However, due to impeding Räikkönen in Q1, Hamilton received a 3-place grid penalty from the stewards which elevated Bottas into third position. Fortunately for the Briton, Magnussen in P5 also received a grid penalty. Due to the way in which penalties are applied in sequence, Hamilton only dropped from P2 to P4. Mercedes were unable to compete for the win on Sunday. Both drivers struggled with overheating problems and Hamilton had to replace his front wing which cost him further time during the pit stops. Bottas was just able to secure P3, less than a second ahead of Vettel while Hamilton finished in P5.

During qualifying of the British Grand Prix, Mercedes secured their seventh front-row lockout of the season. Bottas took pole by just 0.006s, denying Hamilton a record seventh pole in his home race. Leclerc finished in P3, just 0.079s behind the Finn. On Sunday, Mercedes dominated the race and achieved their seventh 1-2 finish of the season. Bottas led from the front and fought off his teammate but a Safety Car intervention gifted Hamilton a free pit stop, allowing him to leapfrog the Finn. The Briton went on to win his home Grand Prix for the sixth time. He also secured the point for the fastest lap on his final lap. After having only used the medium compound tyres for the majority of the race, Bottas needed a second mandatory pit stop shortly before the end. However, he still managed to cross the line in second place. Leclerc completed the podium, finishing over 30 seconds behind the race winner.

After having trailed behind Ferrari in all three practice sessions in Germany, Mercedes benefited from technical issues on Vettel's and Leclerc's cars during qualifying. With both Ferraris being out of contention for the final segment of qualifying, Hamilton took pole while Bottas finished third, behind Verstappen. However, rainy conditions caused a chaotic race which was riddled with both strategy and driver errors. Bottas crashed out while chasing Stroll for P3 while Hamilton finished outside the points in P11. Despite this, after the race, a time penalty was applied to both Alfa Romeo drivers which elevated Hamilton into P9. This result meant that Mercedes avoided their first pointless result since the 2018 Austrian Grand Prix when both cars had to retire due to technical issues.

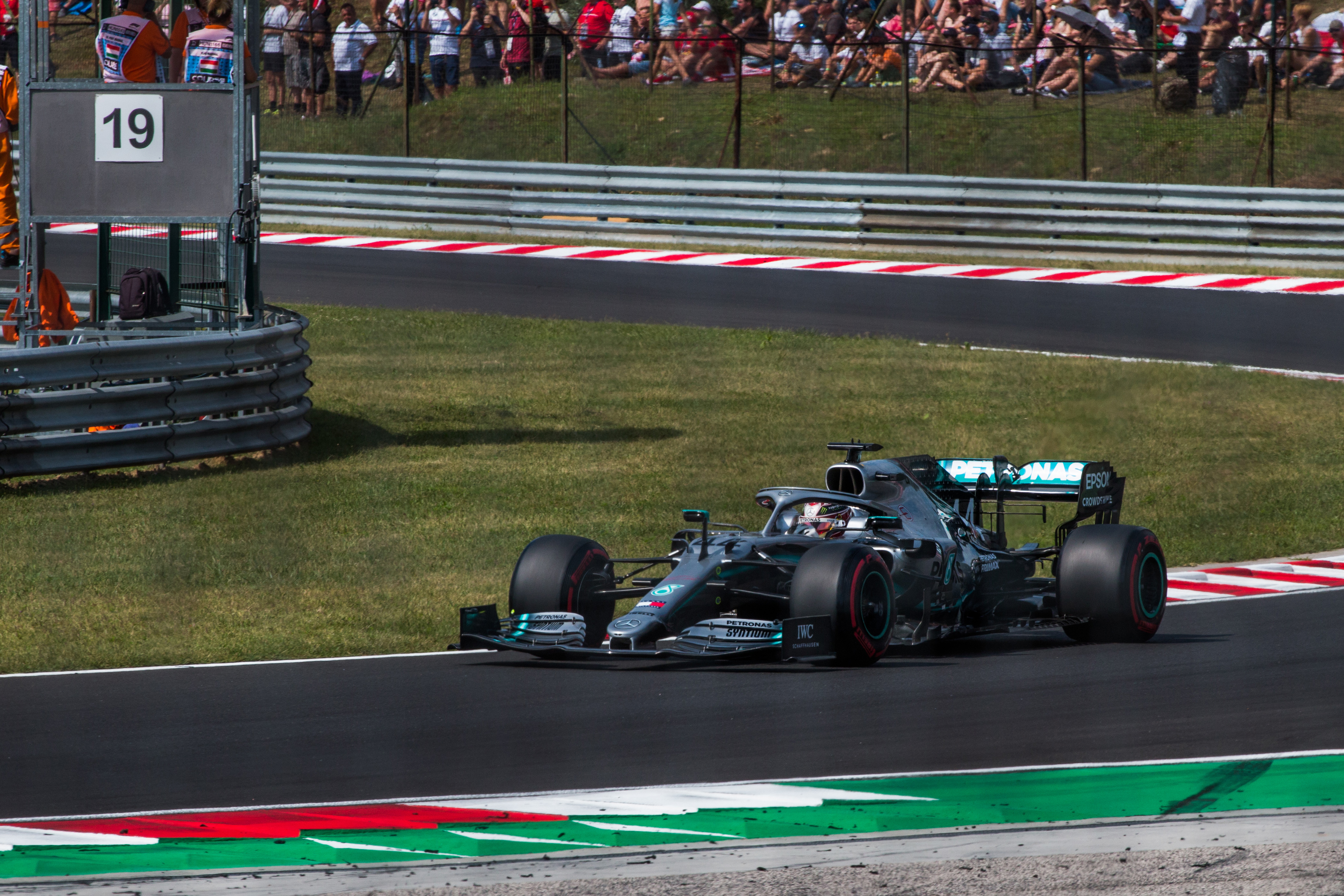
Hamilton took the win of the Hungarian Grand Prix after starting from second on the grid

The upgrade introduced in Germany was kept in the following round in Hungary, but proved to be troublesome to set up for single-lap pace in qualifying, being beaten by Verstappen in a track where Mercedes was expected to keep its superior pace in tighter circuits. Hamilton settled into second behind Verstappen throughout the first half of the race, having overtaken and tangled with his teammate Bottas in the first complex of corners at the start. Bottas was then clipped by Leclerc, which necessitated a change of front wing, consigning him to the midfield for the rest of the race. In the second half of the race, after the first round of pitstops, the Mercedes team took another fresh set of tyres after pulling out the necessary gap to the struggling Ferraris and chased down Verstappen, with Hamilton overtaking him with a few laps to go as the Red Bull driver was struggling with aging tyres.

=== Post-summer break ===
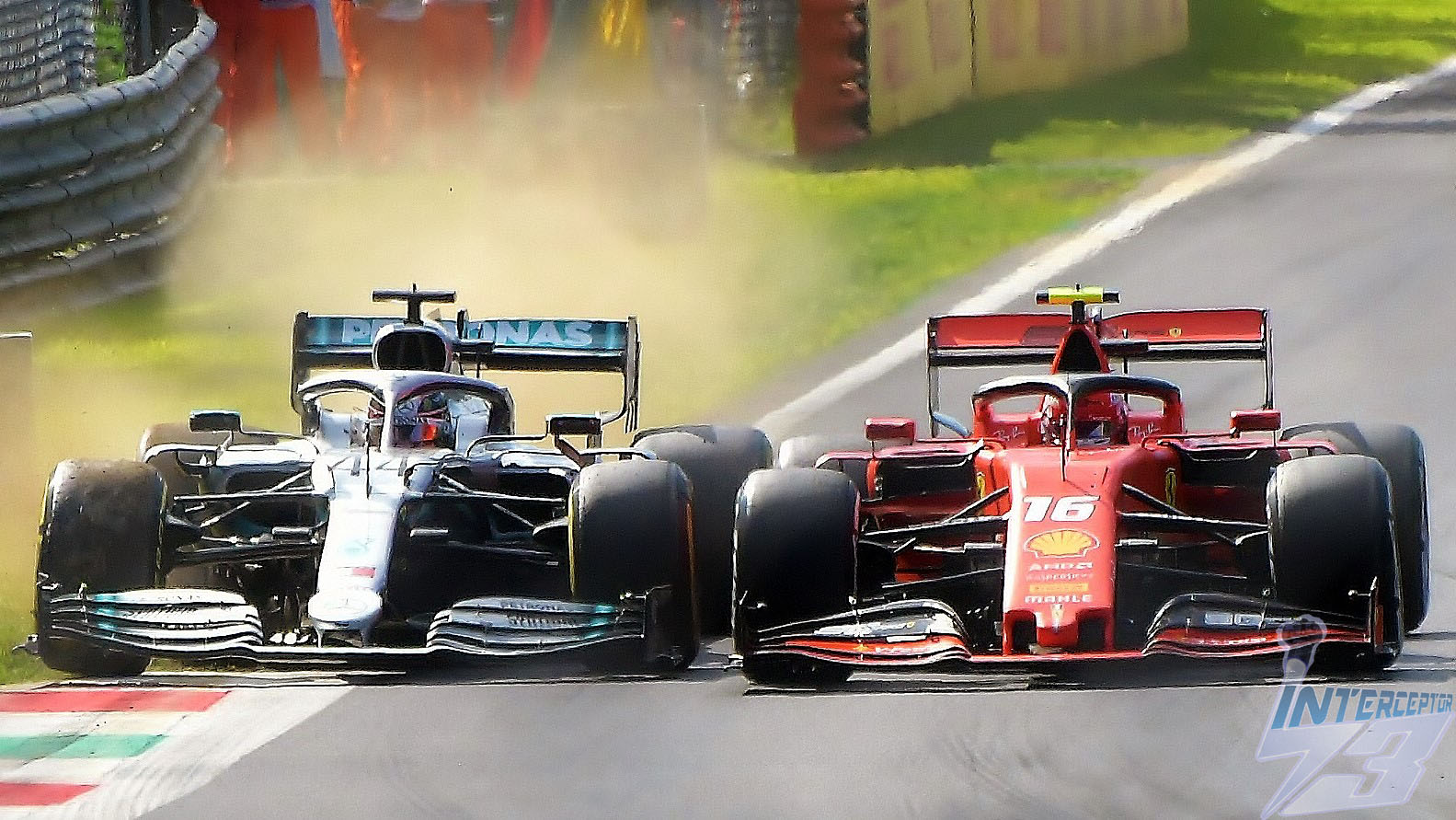
Hamilton battling against Ferrari's Charles Leclerc during the Italian Grand Prix

Following the mandatory summer break, Mercedes introduced the latest iteration of their power units in accordance with Ferrari's step. However, this proved to be insufficient in Belgium and Italy, where the low-drag concept of the Ferrari proved superior in the hands of Charles Leclerc, beating both Mercedes in the two races with Sebastian Vettel struggling with car balance. Additionally, a major aerodynamic upgrade for the Ferrari in Singapore proved a large leap forward, clearly outpacing Mercedes and Red Bull in Singapore, a track whose layout was expected to favor the latter two. Mercedes ran second early on with Hamilton behind Leclerc, who took his third straight pole position, but both were jumped by Vettel after the first pitstop. Hamilton was further shuffled behind Verstappen after Mercedes elected to pit for fresh tyres in a final strategy similar to Hungary, but couldn't overtake the Red Bull driver and finished 4th, with Bottas right behind in 5th after being instructed to slow down to prevent undercutting Hamilton.

Ferrari proved mighty again in qualifying for Russia and Japan, setting pole positions in both races with Leclerc and Vettel respectively. However, team orders conflicts between Vettel and Leclerc, combined with a car failure for Vettel in Russia, allowed both Mercedes to jump both Ferraris in the race, while a bad start for both Ferrari drivers in Japan cost them position to both Mercedes drivers, gifting wins to Hamilton and Bottas respectively in both rounds. Around this time, suspicions were cast over Ferrari's power unit system and operations, with Mercedes often quoting they lost more than half a second in the straights compared to Ferrari. Nevertheless, with their 1-2 finish in Russia and their double podium finish in Suzuka, the team secured the constructors' championship for a record-equalling sixth time, with four races to go.

=== Closing rounds ===
Mercedes struggled with pace in Mexico, with their power unit proving to be too inefficient when compared to Verstappen's Honda-powered Red Bull and too underpowered compared to the Ferraris. However, Verstappen was penalized with a yellow-flag infringement in qualifying after setting pole position, forcing him to start alongside Hamilton, who battled with him at the first complex of corners and damaged both cars when they ran wide into the grass. Bottas crashed in qualifying (which brought up the aforementioned yellow flags), but was unable to take advantage of the battles ahead of him to move forward. Mercedes took several sharp strategy decisions to put Hamilton in the lead and Bottas in third, jumping both Ferraris once again after they led in the first part of the race, from which Hamilton won and took a major step toward his sixth drivers' championship.

Hamilton struggled in qualifying in the next round in Austin as Bottas took pole position, but battled through to second on an alternative strategy in a race where Mercedes was superior in race pace against the field. The Ferraris struggled, with Vettel retiring after a suspension failure and Leclerc falling away rapidly after the first several laps. Mercedes finished 1–2 with Bottas winning, but this result was enough to clinch Hamilton the driver's championship, meaning Mercedes surpassed Ferrari's record with a sixth straight "championship double".

In contrast, Mercedes struggled in Brazil during qualifying, though Hamilton was able to jump Vettel at the start from third and ran second for much of the race behind polesitter Verstappen. With Toto Wolff notably absent from the weekend for the first time in his career with Mercedes, Mercedes and Red Bull traded several strategic moves, but fell short near the end when they took an extra pitstop which dropped Hamilton to fourth during a safety car period in a chaotic race. He made a forceful move against Alexander Albon for second place, crashed with him, and was shuffled back to third after failing to overtake Pierre Gasly in the Toro Rosso at the line. He would later be penalized by the stewards for the move down to seventh, gifting Carlos Sainz his first podium and McLaren's first since 2014. Bottas retired in the middle part of the race with power unit failure, which meant neither Mercedes scored a podium since Singapore.

Hamilton dominated the final race of the season in Abu Dhabi after taking pole, with Bottas starting at the back of the grid after taking a fresh set of power unit components. The latter fought back to fourth after spending the first part of the race without DRS due to an FIA server crash in an otherwise unremarkable race, battling Leclerc for a podium place in the final flurry of laps. To round off Mercedes' successful campaign, Hamilton achieved a 'grand slam': he got pole, set the fastest lap, led every lap of the race and won.

== Sponsorship and livery ==
At the Monaco Grand Prix, the team paid tribute to Niki Lauda. To honour him, the halo device was coloured red with the text "Niki we miss you", the nose cone featured Lauda's signature with the text "Danke Niki" and a red three-pointed star. At the Chinese Grand Prix, the 1000th Grand Prix logos were presented on the bargeboards and nose cone. At the German Grand Prix, the car sported a half silver and half splash white livery with a retro-inspired logos, celebrating 125 years of Mercedes' involvement in motorsport.

== Later use ==
A modified W10 was used during testing of the 2022 tyre compounds after the 2021 Abu Dhabi Grand Prix.

== Complete Formula One results ==
(key)

Year	Entrant	Engine	Tyres	Drivers	Grands Prix																					Points	WCC
Year	Entrant	Engine	Tyres	Drivers	AUS	BHR	CHN	AZE	ESP	MON	CAN	FRA	AUT	GBR	GER	HUN	BEL	ITA	SIN	RUS	JPN	MEX	USA	BRA	ABU	Points	WCC
2019	Mercedes AMG Petronas Motorsport	Mercedes-AMG F1 M10 EQ Power+	P	Bottas	1^{F}	2	2^{P}	1^{P}	2^{P}	3	4^{F}	2	3	2^{P}	Ret	8	3	2	5	2	1	3	1^{P}	Ret^{F}	4	739	1st
2019	Mercedes AMG Petronas Motorsport	Mercedes-AMG F1 M10 EQ Power+	P	Hamilton	2^{P}	1	1	2	1^{F}	1^{P}	1	1^{P}	5	1^{F}	9^{P}	1	2	3^{F}	4	1^{F}	3^{F}	1	2	7	1^{P}^{F}	739	1st

== Notes ==
Awards
Preceded by Mercedes AMG F1 W09 EQ Power+	Autosport; Racing Car of the Year; 2019	Succeeded by Mercedes-AMG F1 W11 EQ Performance
