= Aldo Costa =

Italian engineer and car designer (born 1961)

- Born: 5 June 1961 (age 65); Parma, Italy
- Education: University of Bologna
- Occupation: Motorsport engineer
- Employer: Dallara
- Known for: Formula One car designer at Minardi, Ferrari, and Mercedes
- Title: Chief technical officer

Aldo Costa (born 5 June 1961) is an Italian engineer who is the chief technical officer at Dallara since 2020. After graduating from the University of Bologna, Costa joined the Formula One team Minardi as the chief car designer in 1988, eventually becoming its technical director by 1989, a role he held until 1995, with the best result of a fourth place in the race and a front row in qualifying. He joined Ferrari in 1995, achieving significant success and helping build the most successful dynasty in Formula One between 1999 and 2008, first as assistant to the chief designer (1998–2004) and then as chief designer (2004–2006), followed by roles as head of design and development (2006–2007) and chassis and technical director (2007–2011).

After leaving Ferrari in 2011, Costa joined Mercedes, sparking an equally successfully dynasty between 2014 and 2018 as engineering director, serving as a technical consultant in 2019. As a result, Costa is one of the most successful engineers and designers in Formula One history. From Minardi to Ferrari to Mercedes, he was able to improve each team's fortunes as Minardi achieved its first Formula One points and best race results, and he contributed to Ferrari winning its first Constructors' and Drivers' titles since 1983 and 1979. He also contributed to the 2014–2021 era of Mercedes, which eclipsed his own dynasty at Ferrari.

Overall, Costa's Formula One cars took part to 567 Grands Prix, achieving 192 wins (37.9%, almost four wins every ten races in a 30-year career, which rises to 192 wins out of 378 Grands Prix, or 50.8%, when considering only his tenure at Ferrari and Mercedes), 192 pole positions, 414 podium finishes, and 159 fastest laps. With 28 Formula One world championships (14 constructors' championships and 12 drivers' titles) working for Ferrari and Mercedes, Costa is one of the most successful engineers and designers in Formula One history. His championship-winning cars amassed 168 wins out of 257 Grands Prix (65.4%), 165 pole positions, 354 podium finishes, and 135 fastest laps. He also helped to design race-winning or championship-contending cars in 1996, 1997, 1998, 2005, 2006, 2009, 2010, 2011, and 2013.

== Early life and education ==
Costa was born on 5 June 1961 in Parma, a city in the Italian region of Emilia-Romagna. From 1976 to 1980, he attended his hometown liceo scientifico named after the partisan Giacomo Ulivi, obtaining his high school diploma with a grade of 54 out of 60. After completing his secondary education, he continued studying and graduated from the University of Bologna in Mechanical Engineering. Attending the university from 1981 to 1986, he obtained his PhD in Mechanical Engineering with a grade of 100 out of 100. His thesis, titled "Progettazione assistita di sospensioni di vetture F1 – presso Ferrari S.p.A. Gestione Sportiva", was about the Formula One car suspension systems, gathering the information from the Ferrari racing department. By 1987, he passed the state exam to qualify as a professional engineer and joined the Register of Engineers of the Province of Parma.

== Abarth ==
Following his graduation in 1986, Costa started working at the Fiat group through Abarth in Turin, where his father worked. Costa recalled that his father often went to the Filadelfia Stadium to watch the Grande Torino and told him that a goal from Valentino Mazzola was "worth the price of admission alone". During his time at Abarth, which lasted 18 months, he worked with CAD/CAM and was in the calculation department from September 1987 to February 1988. In his role as stress engineer, he was the calculation engineer for rally cars, such as the highly successful Lancia Delta Integrale. At the age of 27, Costa's work attracted the attention of Giancarlo Minardi, who hired him to be the chief designer of the Minardi Formula One team.

== Formula One career ==
=== Minardi ===
Hired to be the team's chief designer, Costa became part of the team to focus on the car's suspension, with Nigel Cowperthwaite taking care of aerodynamics, as part of a young team of engineers. By 1989, Costa followed Giacomo Caliri as technical director of the team, which had begun to obtain its first points when Costa joined in 1988. Costa remained in charge of all technical matters at Minardi until he left for Ferrari by late 1995. In the Faenza-based team, Costa held various positions; he was structural calculation engineer (head of structural office from March 1988 to July 1989), manager of the car design development (car chief designer from July 1989 to January 1991), and then technical director (from January 1991 to August 1995).

During his tenure, Minardi obtained a historic front row with Pierluigi Martini at the 1990 United States Grand Prix, where he also set the second fastest race lap, with a best race result of fourth (narrowly missing a podium finish), which was achieved multiple times between 1991 and 1993. These results, which ultimately proved to be the team's hay days, allowed Minardi to secure a partnership with Ferrari, which would deliver Ferrari engines to Minardi starting from the 1991 season.

=== Ferrari ===
In 1995, Costa joined Ferrari, where his first assignment was to develop for the BPR Global GT Series the grand touring (GT) version of the Ferrari F50, which became the Ferrari F50 GT. He held this role (F50GT project concept designer) from September 1995 to January 1996. By January 1996, he was promoted to head of chassis design office, a position he held until July 2004. In 1997, he became head of chassis design within the sports management. In 1998, he became assistant to the team's chief designer, Rory Byrne, working closely with Ross Brawn and Byrne. From 1999 to 2008, Ferrari achieved an unparalleled dominance, winning eight Constructors' titles (six of each consecutively) and six Drivers' titles (five of each consecutively by the same driver, which is still a record in the 2020s) in less than ten years. He was one of the key designers of both Ferrari and Formula One's best cars, such as the F2002 and the F2004. In October 2020, Costa recalled his time at Ferrari, where he met Michael Schumacher, as "wonderful years, even on a human level", and said that "it was Michael himself, along with Ross Brawn, who asked me to follow him to Mercedes in 2012."

When Byrne announced his intention to retire in 2004, Costa was named as his successor and from July 2004 to December 2006 served as the team's chief designer. Byrne credited the design of the 2005 Ferrari to Costa. Although Byrne expressed his belief that the F2005 would surpass the F2004 and be the "best ever Ferrari Formula One car", praising Costa, who succeeded him as overseer of design and development, it proved to be a disappointing season, with only a win at the controversial 2005 United States Grand Prix. This was in large part because the FIA, in an attempt to end Ferrari's dominance and provide more competition after the dominant season with the F2004, mandated a rule change banning pit stops and requiring Formula One tyres to last a full race. Before the 2006 season, Costa was promoted to be the head of design and development at Ferrari, as the team announced Nikolas Tombazis as their new chief designer. On 12 November 2007, Ferrari announced that Costa would take on the role of technical director. He was chassis director from January 2007 to December 2007 and technical director from January 2008 to June 2011. In May 2011, after a bad start to the 2011 season, Ferrari announced that Costa had relinquished his position as technical director to take on new responsibilities within the company. Pat Fry took over the role of chief designer at Ferrari.

Costa's dismissal was seen as "a less than gracious manner" as he helped design the F2007 and F2008, which are the last Ferrari cars to have won a Formula One world championship. Some observers felt that Ferrari made a mistake, especially in retrospect, and said that Costa was treated as "if he were a useless pawn on the Maranello chessboard". In August 2014, Costa himself, who said that he worked for "a legendary company" and is sorry to see "the state Ferrari is in in Formula 1", argued that he was dismissed "in a way I can't describe as elegant". He said that he held no grudge against the then Ferrari team principal Stefano Domenicali and that while there are "so many talented people working at Maranello, and I feel affection for them, and it pains me to know they're involved in such a complicated situation", he was happy at Mercedes. Rumours of a possible move back to Ferrari, such as in 2016, ultimately never materialised.

In hindsight, attempting to explain why Ferrari in his opinion took many steps backward over the years, Costa argued that serious "strategic errors were made, especially in terms of vision. And, obviously, the most appropriate decisions regarding personnel weren't made." He recalled that in 2008 the racing department had submitted a request to proceed with the construction of a new wind tunnel, described in 2014 as "one of the Prancing Horse's biggest selling points in recent seasons", because he and his team believed it was important to stay competitive; however, Costa said that they were told it was not appropriate and there was no need for it. According to Costa, this decision was taken by Luca Cordero di Montezemolo, whom Costa said was "the person who made all the decisions, from strategies to personnel" and that "he made them when Ferrari was winning, and he made them even when it stopped winning. Just to be clear!"

Costa's departure came after the 2011 Spanish Grand Prix. Reportedly, Fernando Alonso was so angry with the result that he called for Costa to be dismissed. Costa dismissed this rumour, stating that "Fernando is a great driver. Outside of the car, I've never been able to understand him. For me, he remains an enigmatic and indecipherable character." According to Costa, the real problem was Tombazis as the chief designer. In a 2014 interview, Costa was quoted as saying: "When they sent me away, they told me I was the one who was stifling the Greek designer's creativity. After unleashing his imagination, the results are there for all to see, right?" In an October 2020 interview, he reiterated that "I wouldn't even talk about Ferrari under torture..."

=== Mercedes ===
On 20 July 2011, it was announced that Costa would leave Ferrari by mutual agreement. On 30 September 2011, news surfaced that he would be joining Mercedes as engineering director of the team. Costa led the design of the 2013 Mercedes AMG F1 W04 car under technical director Bob Bell. In 2014, 2015, 2016, 2017, and 2018 (with 2019 as technical consultant for the Mercedes AMG F1 W10 EQ Power+), he was the engineering director for the world championship winning Mercedes F1 W05 Hybrid, Mercedes F1 W06 Hybrid, Mercedes F1 W07 Hybrid, Mercedes AMG F1 W08 EQ Power+, and Mercedes AMG F1 W09 EQ Power+ cars. He served in this role from December 2011 to December 2019.

As the only Italian engineer to have worked with both Schumacher and Lewis Hamilton, contributing to five of their seven Drivers' titles, Costa described them as more similar to each other than one might imagine, stating that they are champions "distinct and distant in their ways, but similar in one thing: the obsessive pursuit of perfection". In October 2020, Costa recalled that he had "a great time" with both of them, stating that "we understood each other instantly" and were "united by our passion for technology". He added that "Hamilton would call me at home on Sundays to discuss a detail of the car! And Michael would call you to ask: when are we going to test that particular detail on the track?"

In his role at Mercedes, Costa was responsible for design and development, and also served as interim technical director of the team from January to March 2017, when he was replaced by former Ferrari engineer James Allison, who won seven consecutive Drivers' and Constructors' titles from 2000 to 2006 at Ferrari and Renault. In July 2018, as part of a technical shake-up and restructure for the 2019 season, including the retirement of performance director Mark Ellis, as well as other senior leaders, it was announced that Costa would step down from his role as engineering director at the end of the season to become an adviser as technical consultant. He cited a need to spend more time with his family in his native Italy. In September 2019, Costa departed from his advisor role at Mercedes, again citing family reasons. A 2022 analysis of chief designers showed that Costa was sixth and was the most successful Italian designer, alongside Mauro Forghieri, with 11 titles to his name (2007–2008 and 2014–2017) as one of the chief designers. When accounting for how many individuals worked on a project, thus earning more points when they were the sole chief designer and so on, Costa was ranked eight with a rating of 4,164.

== Chief technical officer of Dallara ==
On 6 September 2019, it was announced that Costa had joined the Italian race car constructor Dallara as its chief technical officer, succeeding the company founder Giampaolo Dallara by 2020. In January 2020, he officially took over as the chief technical officer of Dallara. In a February 2024 interview, Costa said that he and Dallara work on "17 automotive projects, from Indy Car to Formula E, the all-electric single-seater series". Moreover, he said that among other things he and Dallara collaborate with Ferrari in the team's successful Le Mans Hypercar project.

== Personal life and other roles ==
As of December 2020, Costa is married to Letizia Antonini, with two children and two nephews, and he resides in his hometown of Parma. In 2018, Costa turned into a race driver when Mercedes needed one for its 2013 car drive at the Imola circuit. Since leaving Mercedes in 2019, Costa returned to live in Italy and semi-retired as he began working with Dallara in the 2020s. In Parma, he is also a member of the board of directors of Costa Eugenio since January 2018.

== Accomplishments ==
=== Formula One World Championships ===
No.	Seasons	Constructors' Champion	Drivers' Champion	Car	Engine	Ref
1	1999 Formula One season	Ferrari	—N/a	F399	Ferrari	
2	2000 Formula One season	Ferrari	Michael Schumacher	F1-2000	Ferrari	
3	2001 Formula One season	Ferrari	Michael Schumacher	F2001	Ferrari	
4	2002 Formula One season	Ferrari	Michael Schumacher	F2002	Ferrari	
5	2003 Formula One season	Ferrari	Michael Schumacher	F2003-GA	Ferrari	
6	2004 Formula One season	Ferrari	Michael Schumacher	F2004	Ferrari	
7	2007 Formula One season	Ferrari	Kimi Räikkönen	F2007	Ferrari	
8	2008 Formula One season	Ferrari	—N/a	F2008	Ferrari	
9	2014 Formula One season	Mercedes	Lewis Hamilton	F1 W05 Hybrid	Mercedes	
10	2015 Formula One season	Mercedes	Lewis Hamilton	F1 W06 Hybrid	Mercedes	
11	2016 Formula One season	Mercedes	Nico Rosberg	F1 W07 Hybrid	Mercedes	
12	2017 Formula One season	Mercedes	Lewis Hamilton	F1 W08 EQ Power+	Mercedes	
13	2018 Formula One season	Mercedes	Lewis Hamilton	F1 W09 EQ Power+	Mercedes	
14	2019 Formula One season	Mercedes	Lewis Hamilton	F1 W10 EQ Power+	Mercedes	

=== Championship-winning cars statistics ===
Season	World Championship		Chassis	Engine	Statistics					
Season	Constructors'	Drivers'	Chassis	Engine	Races	Wins	Poles	F/Laps	Podiums	WCC
1999	Costa was assistant to the chief designer									
1999	(Italy) Ferrari	—N/a	F399	Ferrari	16	6	3	6	17	1st
2000	(Italy) Ferrari	(Germany) Michael Schumacher	F1-2000	Ferrari	17	10	10	5	21	1st
2001	(Italy) Ferrari	(Germany) Michael Schumacher	F2001	Ferrari	20	10	13*	3	26	1st
2002	(Italy) Ferrari	(Germany) Michael Schumacher	F2002	Ferrari	19	15*	11	15*	28	1st
2003	(Italy) Ferrari	(Germany) Michael Schumacher	F2003-GA	Ferrari	12	7	5	5	13	1st
2004	(Italy) Ferrari	(Germany) Michael Schumacher	F2004	Ferrari	20	15*	12	14	30*	1st
2007	Costa was head of design and development									
2007	(Italy) Ferrari	(Finland) Kimi Räikkönen	F2007	Ferrari	17	9	9	12	22	1st
2008	(Italy) Ferrari	—N/a	F2008	Ferrari	18	8	8	13	19	1st
2014	Costa was engineering director									
2014	(Germany) Mercedes	(United Kingdom) Lewis Hamilton	W05	Mercedes	19	16	18	12	31	1st
2015	(Germany) Mercedes	(United Kingdom) Lewis Hamilton	W06	Mercedes	19	16	18	13*	32	1st
2016	(Germany) Mercedes	(Germany) Nico Rosberg	W07	Mercedes	21	19*	20†	9	33†	1st
2017	(Germany) Mercedes	(United Kingdom) Lewis Hamilton	W08	Mercedes	20	12	15	9	26	1st
2018	(Germany) Mercedes	(United Kingdom) Lewis Hamilton	W09	Mercedes	21	11	13	10	25	1st
2019	Costa was technical consultant									
2019	(Germany) Mercedes	(United Kingdom) Lewis Hamilton	W10	Mercedes	21	15	10	9	32	1st

Notes

Key: (Bold) personal record; (*) constructor record; (†) Formula One record

=== Honours ===
- Officer of the Order of Merit of the Italian Republic, 22 October 2022.
