= Pierluigi Martini =

Italian racing driver (born 1961)

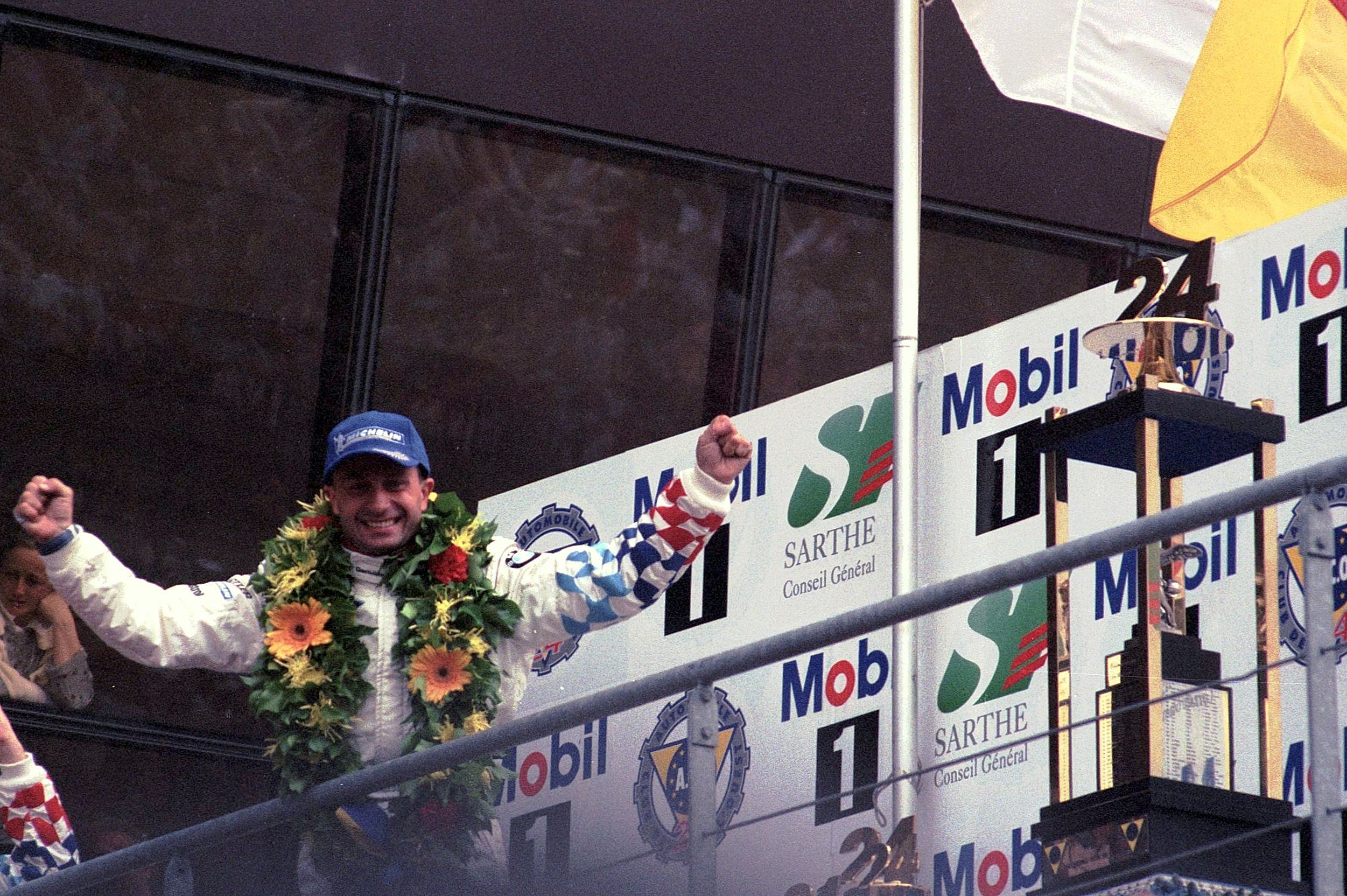
- Martini in 1999 at Le Mans
- Born: 23 April 1961 (age 65); Lugo, Emilia-Romagna, Italy
- Relatives: Oliver Martini (brother); Giancarlo Martini (uncle)

Formula One World Championship career
- Nationality: (Italy) Italian
- Active years: 1984–1985, 1988–1995
- Team(s): Toleman, Minardi, Scuderia Italia
- Entries: 124 (118 starts)
- Championships: 0
- Wins: 0
- Podiums: 0
- Career points: 18
- Pole positions: 0
- Fastest laps: 0
- First entry: 1984 Italian Grand Prix
- Last entry: 1995 German Grand Prix

24 Hours of Le Mans career
- Years: 1984, 1996–1999
- Teams: Lancia, Joest, Italia, BMW
- Best finish: 1st (1999)
- Class wins: 1 (1999)

Pierluigi Martini (Italian pronunciation: [ˌpjɛrluˈiːdʒi marˈtiːni]; born 23 April 1961) is an Italian former racing driver, who competed in Formula One from 1984 to 1985 and from 1988 to 1995. In endurance racing, Martini won the 24 Hours of Le Mans in 1999 with BMW.

Born in Lugo, Emilia-Romagna, Martini is the nephew of Formula Two driver Giancarlo Martini and the older brother of Oliver. He finished runner-up to Ivan Capelli in the 1986 International Formula 3000 Championship. Martini contested 124 Formula One Grands Prix between 1984 and 1995 for Toleman, Minardi, and Scuderia Italia, achieving 18 championship points.

== Early life ==
Martini's uncle, Giancarlo Martini, raced during the 1970s, including some non-championship races in a Ferrari 312T entered by Scuderia Everest, a team owned by Giancarlo Minardi. Pierluigi's younger brother, Oliver, is also a racing driver. In 1983, Martini competed in Formula 3 with Luigi Pavesi racing. He won four races and secured both the Italian Formula 3 and European Formula 3 titles the same year.

== Formula One ==
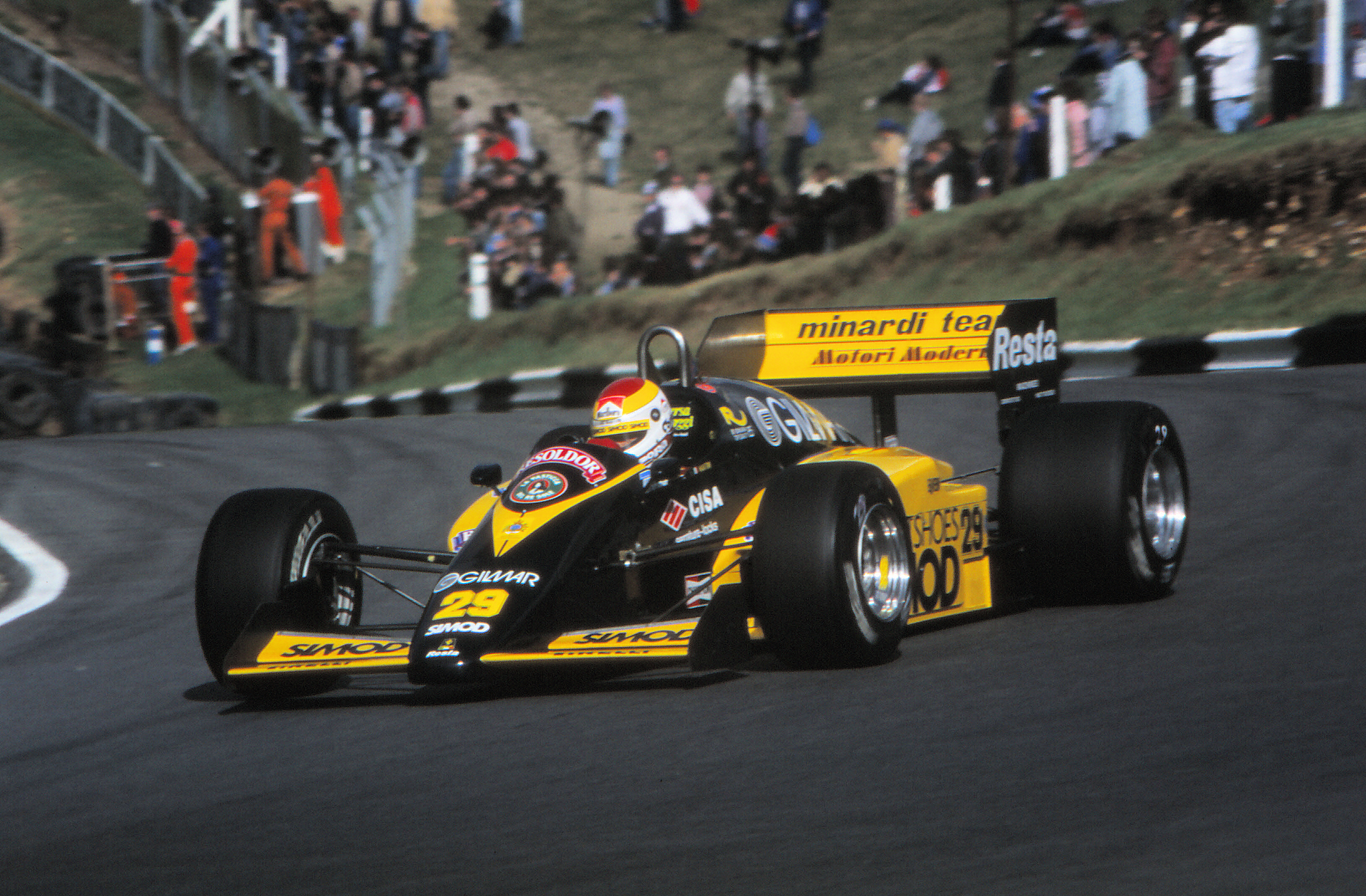
Martini driving for Minardi at the 1985 European Grand Prix

Martini participated in 124 Formula One Grands Prix, debuting on 9 September 1984, driving for Toleman in place of suspended Ayrton Senna at the 1984 Italian Grand Prix. He scored a total of 18 championship points and was synonymous with the Minardi team (run by the same Giancarlo Minardi who had previously owned Scuderia Everest).

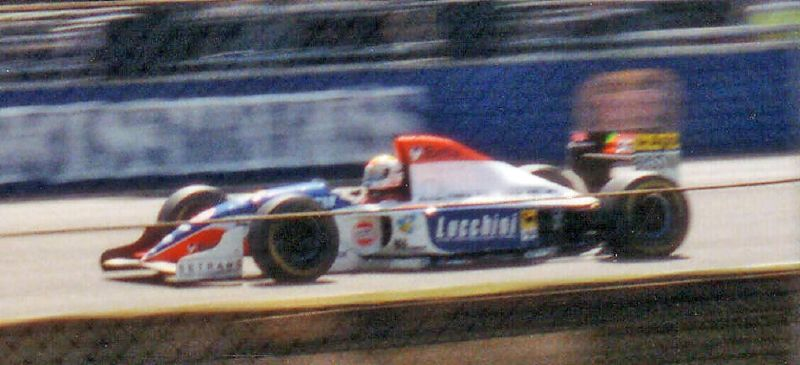
Martini driving a Minardi M194 at the 1994 British Grand Prix

Indeed, aside from a single outing with Toleman and a one-season dalliance with Scuderia Italia in 1992, Martini's entire Formula One career was spent with the Italian outfit. He raced with the minnow team in three different stints, drove for them on their debut in 1985, scored their first point in the 1988 Detroit Grand Prix, and their only front-row start at the 1990 United States Grand Prix (where unexpected rain on Saturday meant that the grid was decided entirely by times from Friday's session. Pirelli's soft qualifying tyres caught Goodyear off guard, and the Italian manufacturer put five of its teams in the top ten positions). Both Martini and Minardi led a race for a single lap at the 1989 Portuguese Grand Prix, and their joint-best finish was fourth at the 1991 San Marino Grand Prix and 1991 Portuguese Grand Prix, the latter being Martini's single finish on the lead lap. Initially out of a drive for 1993, he was recalled back to the little Italian team midway through the season in place of Fabrizio Barbazza, Martini impressed by outpacing his young teammate Christian Fittipaldi.

Martini was also one of the drivers with a reputation for ignoring blue flags. Examples given are the 1991 Monaco Grand Prix when he held up Emanuele Pirro in the Dallara, Stefano Modena in the Tyrrell, and Riccardo Patrese in the Williams for several laps despite running towards the back of the field, and the 1995 Canadian Grand Prix where he blocked Gerhard Berger in the Ferrari when the Austrian tried to lap him. On both occasions, Martini was called in for a ten-second stop-and-go penalty for ignoring blue flags.

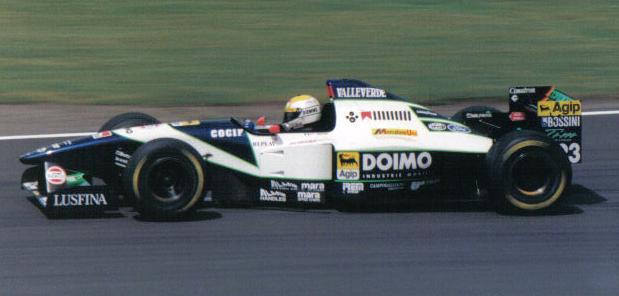
Martini driving a Minardi M195 at the 1995 British Grand Prix

Quizzed about this attitude on the occasion of the 1995 San Marino Grand Prix, where he held up winner Damon Hill, Martini replied: 'What should I exactly apologise for? My trajectories are always clean. Should I just park the car on the grass? I'm here to do my race like anybody else. I've always been correct. Those who complain about my conduct should explain why they cannot overtake me when their car has at least 150 hp more than mine'.

== Sportscars ==
Prior to commencing his Formula One career, Martini drove a Lancia LC2 in the 1984 24 Hours of Le Mans. After leaving Formula One, he began a successful career in sportscar racing. He contested the 1996 24 Hours of Le Mans in a Porsche run by Joest Racing. 1997 brought a fourth-place finish in a Porsche 911 GT1 which he also raced in the FIA GT Championship that year. In 1998, he joined the brand-new Le Mans program of BMW Motorsports.

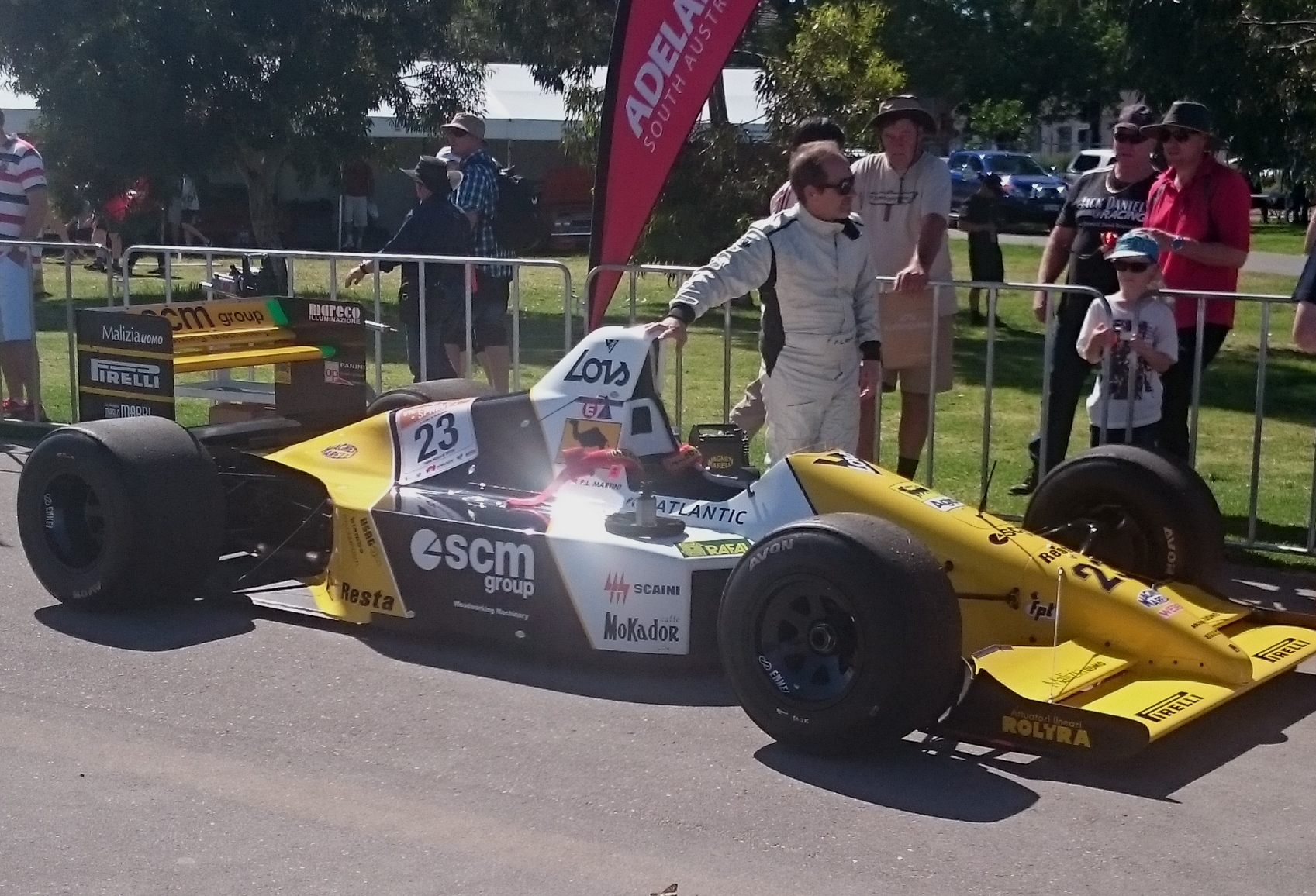
Martini and a Minardi M189 at the 2016 Adelaide Motorsport Festival

In 1999, Martini, Yannick Dalmas and Joachim Winkelhock won the Le Mans 24 Hours. The trio drove for BMW. The team had to fight both Toyota and Mercedes works cars and won the race by a lap over the runner-up Toyota.

Martini returned to motorsports in 2006, competing in the Grand Prix Masters series for retired Formula One drivers.

== Racing record ==
=== Career summary ===
Season	Series	Team	Races	Wins	Poles	F/Laps	Podiums	Points	Position
1981	Italian Formula Three	Trivellato Racing	9	0	0	0	0	6	14th
1981	European Formula Three	Trivellato Racing	3	0	0	0	0	0	NC
1982	Italian Formula Three	Pavesi Racing	9	3	1	4	5	40.5	**3rd**
1982	European Formula Three	Pavesi Racing	2	0	0	0	0	0	NC
1983	European Formula Three	Pavesi Racing	14	4	3	5	8	66	**1st**
1983	Macau Grand Prix	Pavesi Racing	1	0	0	0	0	N/A	DNF
1983	European Formula Two	Minardi Team Srl	1	0	0	0	1	6	11th
1984	World Sportscar Championship	Martini Racing	5	0	0	1	0	10	44th
1984	24 Hours of Le Mans	BP Résidences Malardeau, Scuderia Jolly Club	1	0	0	0	0	N/A	DNF
1984	Formula One	Toleman Group Motorsport	0	0	0	0	0	0	NC
1985	Formula One	Minardi Team	15	0	0	0	0	0	NC
1986	International Formula 3000	Pavesi Racing	10	3	2	1	5	36	**2nd**
1986	Macau Grand Prix	Pavesi Racing	1	0	0	0	0	N/A	10th
1987	International Formula 3000	Pavesi Racing	11	0	0	0	1	8	11th
1988	International Formula 3000	First Racing	10	1	0	1	4	23	4th
1988	Formula One	Lois Minardi Team	9	0	0	0	0	1	17th
1989	Formula One	Minardi Team SpA	15	0	0	0	0	5	15th
1989	Italian Superturismo Championship	?	?	?	?	?	?	?	?
1990	Formula One	SCM Minardi Team	15	0	0	0	0	0	NC
1991	Formula One	Minardi Team	16	0	0	0	0	6	11th
1992	Formula One	Scuderia Italia SpA	16	0	0	0	0	2	16th
1993	Formula One	Minardi Team	8	0	0	0	0	0	NC
1994	Formula One	Minardi Scuderia Italia	16	0	0	0	0	4	21st
1995	Formula One	Minardi Scuderia Italia	9	0	0	0	0	0	NC
1996	24 Hours of Le Mans	Joest Racing	1	0	0	0	0	N/A	DNF
1997	FIA GT Championship	BMS Scuderia Italia	8	0	0	0	0	1	33rd
1997	24 Hours of Le Mans	BMS Scuderia Italia	1	0	0	0	0	N/A	8th
1997	International Sports Racing Series	Joest Racing	1	1	0	1	1	N/A	NC
1998	24 Hours of Le Mans	Team BMW Motorsport	1	0	0	0	0	N/A	DNF
1998	International Sports Racing Series	BMW Team Rafanelli	2	0	0	0	1	N/A	NC
1999	24 Hours of Le Mans	BMW Motorsport	1	1	0	?	1	N/A	**1st**
1999	American Le Mans Series	Schnitzer Motorsport	1	0	0	0	0	1	88th
2000	American Le Mans Series	Team Rafanelli	1	0	0	0	0	N/A	NC
2006	Grand Prix Masters	Team Global Logistics, Team Motorola	2	0	0	1	0	1	8th
2009	Campionato Italiano Superstars	Zakspeed Team	18	3	0	1	6	114	5th
2009	International Superstars Series	Zakspeed Team	10	1	0	1	1	31	10th

=== Complete European Formula Two Championship results ===
(key) (Races in bold indicate pole position; races in italics indicate fastest lap)

Year	Entrant	Chassis	Engine	1	2	3	4	5	6	7	8	9	10	11	12	Pos.	Pts
1983	Minardi Team Srl	Minardi M283	BMW	SIL	THR	HOC	NÜR	VAL	PAU	JAR	DON	MIS; 2	PER	ZOL	MUG	11th	6

=== Complete International Formula 3000 results ===
(key) (Races in bold indicate pole position; races in italics indicate fastest lap.)

Year	Entrant	Chassis	Engine	1	2	3	4	5	6	7	8	9	10	11	Pos.	Pts
1986	Pavesi Corse	Ralt RB20	Cosworth	SIL; 19	VAL; 10	PAU; DNQ	SPA; 11								**2nd**	**36**
1986	Pavesi Corse	Ralt RT20	Cosworth					IMO; 1	**MUG**; 1	PER; 2	ÖST; 7	**BIR**; 2	BUG; Ret	JAR; 1	**2nd**	**36**
1987	Pavesi Racing	Ralt RT21	Cosworth	SIL; 5	VAL; Ret	SPA; Ret	PAU; 7	DON; 8		BRH; 20	BIR; Ret	IMO; Ret	BUG; 7		11th	8
1987	Pavesi Racing	Ralt RT20	Cosworth						PER; 2					JAR; 9	11th	8
1988	First Racing	March 88B	Judd	JER; 8	VAL; 11	PAU; 3	SIL; 10	MNZ; Ret	PER; 1	BRH; 2	BIR; 3	BUG	ZOL; Ret	DIJ; 10	4th	23

=== Complete Formula One results ===
(key)

Year	Entrant	Chassis	Engine	1	2	3	4	5	6	7	8	9	10	11	12	13	14	15	16	17	WDC	Points
1984	Toleman Group Motorsport	Toleman TG184	Hart Straight-4	BRA	RSA	BEL	SMR	FRA	MON	CAN	DET	DAL	GBR	GER	AUT	NED	ITA; DNQ	EUR	POR		NC	0
1985	Minardi Team	Minardi M185	Cosworth V8	BRA; Ret	POR; Ret																NC	0
1985	Minardi Team	Minardi M185	MM V6			SMR; Ret	MON; DNQ	CAN; Ret	DET; Ret	FRA; Ret	GBR; Ret	GER; 11	AUT; Ret	NED; Ret	ITA; Ret	BEL; 12	EUR; Ret	RSA; Ret	AUS; 8		NC	0
1988	Lois Minardi Team	Minardi M188	Cosworth V8	BRA	SMR	MON	MEX	CAN	DET; 6	FRA; 15	GBR; 15	GER; DNQ	HUN; Ret	BEL; DNQ	ITA; Ret	POR; Ret	ESP; Ret	JPN; 13	AUS; 7		17th	1
1989	Minardi Team SpA	Minardi M188B	Cosworth V8	BRA; Ret	SMR; Ret	MON; Ret															15th	5
1989	Minardi Team SpA	Minardi M189	Cosworth V8				MEX; Ret	USA; Ret	CAN; Ret	FRA; Ret	GBR; 5	GER; 9	HUN; Ret	BEL; 9	ITA; 7	POR; 5	ESP; Ret	JPN	AUS; 6		15th	5
1990	SCM Minardi Team	Minardi M189	Cosworth V8	USA; 7	BRA; 9																NC	0
1990	SCM Minardi Team	Minardi M190	Cosworth V8			SMR; DNS	MON; Ret	CAN; Ret	MEX; 12	FRA; Ret	GBR; Ret	GER; Ret	HUN; Ret	BEL; 15	ITA; Ret	POR; 11	ESP; Ret	JPN; 8	AUS; 9		NC	0
1991	Minardi Team	Minardi M191	Ferrari V12	USA; 9	BRA; Ret	SMR; 4	MON; 12	CAN; 7	MEX; Ret	FRA; 9	GBR; 9	GER; Ret	HUN; Ret	BEL; 12	ITA; Ret	POR; 4	ESP; 13	JPN; Ret	AUS; Ret		11th	6
1992	Scuderia Italia SpA	BMS Dallara 192	Ferrari V12	RSA; Ret	MEX; Ret	BRA; Ret	ESP; 6	SMR; 6	MON; Ret	CAN; 8	FRA; 10	GBR; 15	GER; 11	HUN; Ret	BEL; Ret	ITA; 8	POR; Ret	JPN; 10	AUS; Ret		16th	2
1993	Minardi Team	Minardi M193	Ford V8	RSA	BRA	EUR	SMR	ESP	MON	CAN	FRA	GBR; Ret	GER; 14	HUN; Ret	BEL; Ret	ITA; 7	POR; 8	JPN; 10	AUS; Ret		NC	0
1994	Minardi Scuderia Italia	Minardi M193B	Ford V8	BRA; 8	PAC; Ret	SMR; Ret	MON; Ret	ESP; 5													21st	4
1994	Minardi Scuderia Italia	Minardi M194	Ford V8						CAN; 9	FRA; 5	GBR; 10	GER; Ret	HUN; Ret	BEL; 8	ITA; Ret	POR; 12	EUR; 15	JPN; Ret	AUS; 9		21st	4
1995	Minardi Scuderia Italia	Minardi M195	Ford V8	BRA; DNS	ARG; Ret	SMR; 12	ESP; 14	MON; 7	CAN; Ret	FRA; Ret	GBR; 7	GER; Ret	HUN	BEL	ITA	POR	EUR	PAC	JPN	AUS	NC	0

=== Complete 24 Hours of Le Mans results ===
Year	Team	Co-Drivers	Car	Class	Laps	Pos.	Class Pos.
1984	(France) BP Résidences Malardeau (Italy) Scuderia Jolly Club	(France) Xavier Lapeyre (Italy) Beppe Gabbiani	Lancia LC2	C1	117	DNF	DNF
1996	(Germany) Joest Racing	(Italy) Michele Alboreto (Belgium) Didier Theys	TWR Porsche WSC-95	LMP1	300	DNF	DNF
1997	(Italy) BMS Scuderia Italia	(Italy) Christian Pescatori (Brazil) Antônio Hermann de Azevedo	Porsche 911 GT1	GT1	317	8th	4th
1998	(Germany) Team BMW Motorsport	(Germany) Joachim Winkelhock (Venezuela) Johnny Cecotto	BMW V12 LM	LMP1	43	DNF	DNF
1999	(Germany) BMW Motorsport	(Germany) Joachim Winkelhock (France) Yannick Dalmas	BMW V12 LMR	LMP	365	**1st**	**1st**

=== Complete Grand Prix Masters results ===
(key) Races in bold indicate pole position, races in italics indicate fastest lap.

Year	Team	Chassis	Engine	1	2	3	4	5
2006	Team Global Logistics	Delta Motorsport GPM	Nicholson McLaren 3.5 V8	QAT; 6	ITA; C			
2006	Team Motorola	Delta Motorsport GPM	Nicholson McLaren 3.5 V8			GBR; 7	MAL; C	RSA; C

Sporting positions
Preceded by Oscar Larrauri	European Formula 3 Championship; Champion; 1983	Succeeded by Ivan Capelli
Preceded by Laurent Aïello; Allan McNish; Stéphane Ortelli	Winner of the 24 Hours of Le Mans; 1999; With: Yannick Dalmas & Joachim Winkelhock	Succeeded by Frank Biela; Tom Kristensen; Emanuele Pirro
