= Minardi M187 =

Formula One racing car

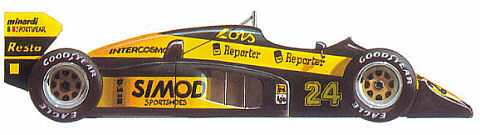
- Category: Formula One
- Constructor: Minardi
- Designer: Giacomo Caliri
- Predecessor: M186
- Successor: M188

Technical specifications
- Chassis: Carbon fibre monocoque
- Suspension (front): Double wishbones, pullrods
- Suspension (rear): Double wishbones, pullrods
- Axle track: Front: 1,812 mm (71.3 in); Rear: 1,661 mm (65.4 in)
- Wheelbase: 2,690 mm (105.9 in)
- Engine: mid-engine, longitudinally mounted, 1,499 cc (91.5 cu in), Motori Moderni 615–90, 90° V6, turbo
- Transmission: Minardi 6-speed manual
- Weight: 540 kg (1,190.5 lb)
- Fuel: Agip
- Tyres: Goodyear

Competition history
- Notable entrants: Minardi
- Notable drivers: 23. (Spain) Adrian Campos; 24. (Italy) Alessandro Nannini
- Debut: 1987 Brazilian Grand Prix
Races	Wins	Poles	F/Laps
16	0	0	0
- Constructors' Championships: 0
- Drivers' Championships: 0
- Unless otherwise stated, all data refer to Formula One World Championship Grands Prix only.

The Minardi M187 was a Formula One car designed by Giacomo Caliri built by Minardi for the 1987 Formula One season. The car was driven by Spanish driver Adrian Campos and Italian Alessandro Nannini. Using the M187, Minardi scored no points during the course of the season.

== Race history ==
Nannini was consistently better performed than both the car and the overweight, underpowered (800 bhp (597 kW; 811 PS)) Motori Moderni V6 turbo. He was let down by the car and finished only three races during the season. His performances were such that he was signed to the Benetton team with their naturally aspirated factory Ford V8 engines for 1988. The chain smoking Italian did not score any points for the season but most agreed that was more the car than driver and his performances for Benetton from 1988 to 1990 would back this up.

Unfortunately the same could not be said for Campos who brought considerably more money to the team than Formula One standard driving talent and it was noted by many, including BBC commentator Murray Walker on a number of occasions, that Campos was out of his depth in Grand Prix racing. The Spaniard was disqualified in the opening race in Brazil for passing cars to take his grid position after stalling at the start of the warm-up lap. He did not start in Monaco due to a crash before the start, and recorded his only finish for the season when he finished 14th (four laps behind winner Nigel Mansell) in his home race in Spain.

The M187 was the last Minardi to use the Motori Moderni engine. The team's replacement car for 1988, the Minardi M188, would use the naturally aspirated customer Ford-Cosworth DFZ V8 engine.

== Livery ==
The M187 retained the black and yellow colour scheme from the previous seasons, with sponsorship from Simod. The signing of Campos as a driver also brought sponsorship from the Spanish jeans company Lois.

== Complete Formula One results ==
(key)

Year	Team	Engine	Tyres	Drivers	1	2	3	4	5	6	7	8	9	10	11	12	13	14	15	16	Points	WCC
1987	Minardi F1 Team	Motori Moderni 615–90; V6 tc	G		BRA	SMR	BEL	MON	DET	FRA	GBR	GER	HUN	AUT	ITA	POR	ESP	MEX	JPN	AUS	0	NC
1987	Minardi F1 Team	Motori Moderni 615–90; V6 tc	G	(Spain) Adrian Campos	DSQ	Ret	Ret	DNS	Ret	Ret	Ret	Ret	Ret	Ret	Ret	Ret	14	Ret	Ret	Ret	0	NC
1987	Minardi F1 Team	Motori Moderni 615–90; V6 tc	G	(Italy) Alessandro Nannini	Ret	Ret	Ret	Ret	Ret	Ret	Ret	Ret	11	Ret	16	11	Ret	Ret	Ret	Ret	0	NC
