= Minardi M185 =

Formula One racing car

Minardi M185 Minardi M185B
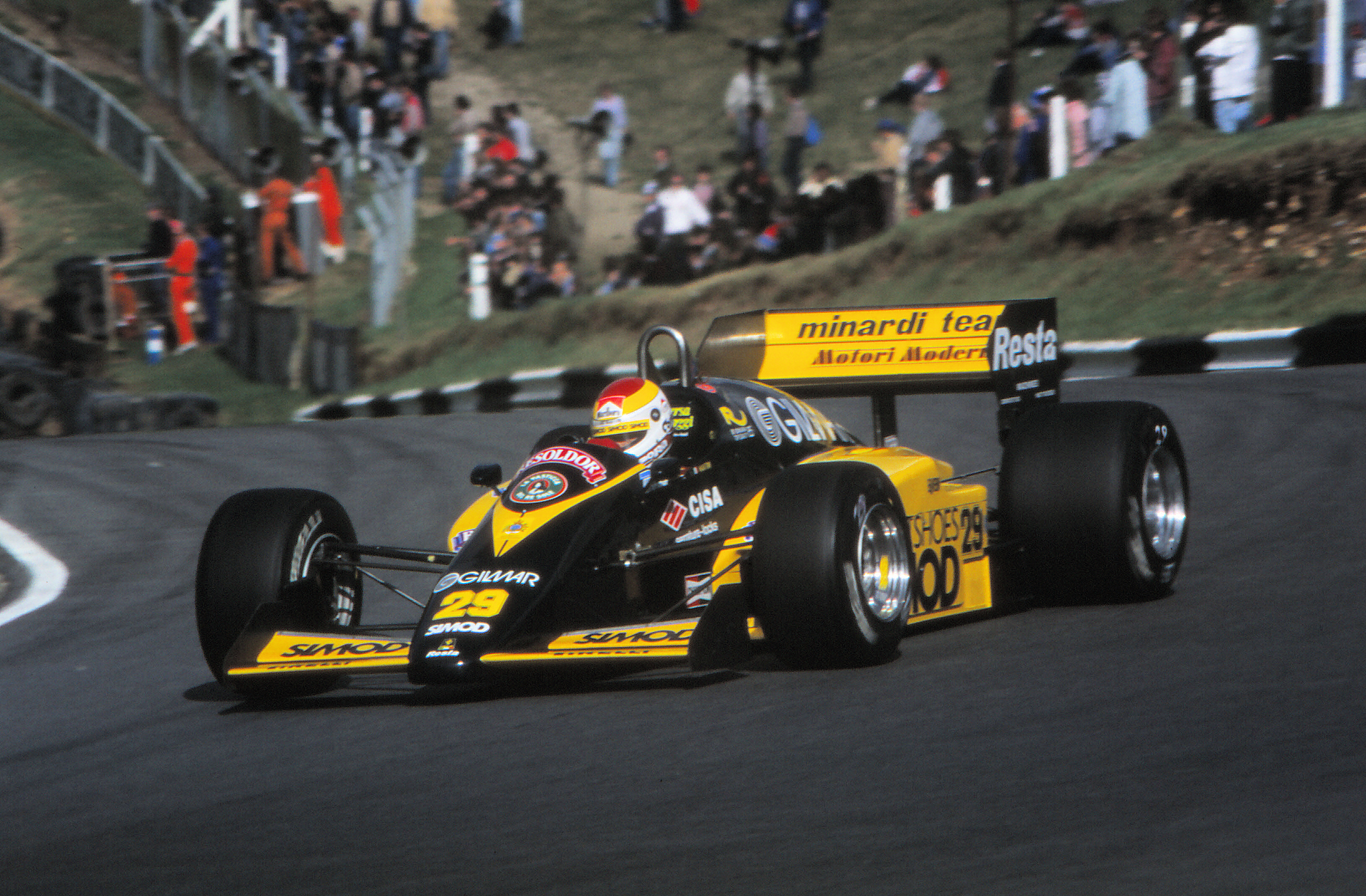
- Pierluigi Martini driving the M185 at the 1985 European Grand Prix
- Category: Formula One
- Constructor: Minardi
- Designer: Giacomo Caliri
- Successor: M186

Technical specifications
- Chassis: Carbon fibre monocoque
- Axle track: Front: 1,813 mm (71.4 in); Rear: 1,661 mm (65.4 in)
- Engine: Motori Moderni 615-90 1,499 cc (91.5 cu in), 90° V6, turbo, mid-engine, longitudinally mounted
- Transmission: Minardi / Hewland 5-speed manual
- Weight: 550 kg (1,210 lb)
- Fuel: Agip
- Tyres: Pirelli

Competition history
- Notable entrants: Minardi Team SpA
- Notable drivers: 23. (Italy) Andrea de Cesaris; 24. (Italy) Alessandro Nannini; 29. (Italy) Pierluigi Martini
- Debut: 1985 Brazilian Grand Prix
Races	Wins	Poles	F/Laps
32	0	0	0
- Constructors' Championships: 0
- Drivers' Championships: 0

The Minardi M185 was a Formula One car, designed by Giacomo Caliri and used by Minardi for use in the 1985 season. It was an unreliable car and only finished three races and did not score any points for the team.

== Development ==
Giancarlo Minardi had run teams in Formula Two for several seasons before turning his attention to Formula One and forming a team to enter the 1985 season. Giacomo Caliri was tasked with the design of the team's new car, designated the Minardi M185 and which was intended to be powered by Motori Moderni 615-90 turbocharged engines. However, the engines were not ready in time for the first two races of the year. The first M185 chassis was modified to accept a Ford Cosworth DFY through the use of a spacer between the engine and gearbox. A total of four M185 chassis were built during the year.

The M185 was updated by Caliri for the 1986 season and was designated the Minardi M185B. A major change, to comply with new regulations, was a reduction in the size of the fuel tank, from the 220-litre tank of 1985 to 195-litres. The front track was also reduced fractionally.

== Race history ==
The team only raced a single entry throughout 1985, which was driven by the young Italian, Pierluigi Martini. He qualified for all but one race of the season, but usually on the back two rows of the grid. He failed to make the grid at the Monaco Grand Prix. Reliability was a problem and Martini was also involved in a number of accidents. Only two finishes were recorded all year, the best being 8th at the Australian Grand Prix. Martini was also classified in 11th at the German Grand Prix although not running at the finish.

Minardi expanded to a two car entry for 1986. Martini left the team, and in his place the experienced Andrea de Cesaris was hired. For the first nine races of the year, de Cesaris drove the M185B before switching to the team's new car, the Minardi M186, from Hungary. No finishes were recorded by de Cesaris with the M185B, and he failed to qualify at Monaco. In the second car, Alessandro Nannini was brought in to make his debut in Formula One. Nannini campaigned the M185B for the entire season. Like the previous season, reliability was poor and only one finish was achieved. This was 14th, in Mexico. Nannini achieved the best grid position for the M185B with 17th, at Hungary. Like de Cesaris, he failed to make the grid at Monaco.

== Livery ==
The M185 featured a black and yellow livery with prominent sponsorship from Italian companies Simod and Gilmar.

== Complete Formula One results ==
(key) (Results in bold indicate pole position; results in italics indicate fastest lap.)

Year	Entrant	Chassis	Engines	Tyres	Driver	1	2	3	4	5	6	7	8	9	10	11	12	13	14	15	16	Pts.	WCC
1985	Minardi Team SpA	M185	Cosworth DFY	P		BRA	POR	SMR	MON	CAN	DET	FRA	GBR	GER	AUT	NED	ITA	BEL	EUR	RSA	AUS	0	NC
1985	Minardi Team SpA	M185	Cosworth DFY	P	(Italy) Pierluigi Martini	Ret	Ret															0	NC
1985	Minardi Team SpA	M185	Motori Moderni 615-90 V6 tc	P	(Italy) Pierluigi Martini			Ret	DNQ	Ret	Ret	Ret	Ret	11*	Ret	Ret	Ret	12	Ret	Ret	8	0	NC
1986	Minardi Team SpA	M185B	Motori Moderni 615-90 V6 tc	P		BRA	ESP	SMR	MON	BEL	CAN	DET	FRA	GBR	GER	HUN	AUT	ITA	EUR	MEX	AUS	0	NC
1986	Minardi Team SpA	M185B	Motori Moderni 615-90 V6 tc	P	(Italy) Andrea de Cesaris	Ret	Ret	Ret	DNQ	Ret	Ret	Ret	Ret	Ret	Ret		Ret					0	NC
1986	Minardi Team SpA	M185B	Motori Moderni 615-90 V6 tc	P	(Italy) Alessandro Nannini	Ret	DNS	Ret	DNQ	Ret	Ret	Ret	Ret	Ret	Ret	Ret		Ret	Ret	14	Ret	0	NC

* not running at finish
