= Alessandro Nannini =

Italian racing driver (born 1959)

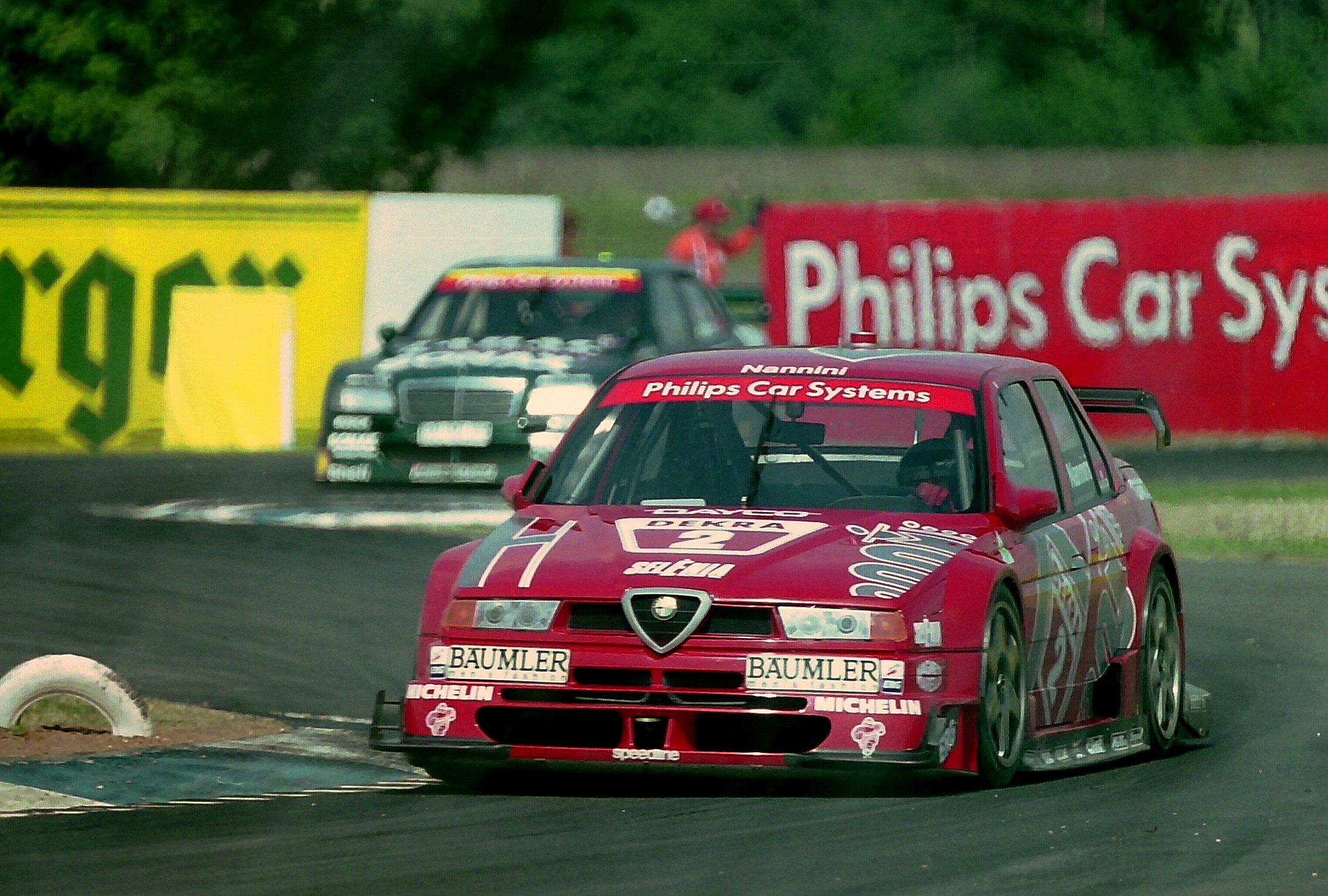
- Nannini driving for Alfa Romeo during the DTM season
- Born: 7 July 1959 (age 67); Siena, Italy
- Relatives: Gianna Nannini (sister); Matteo Nannini (first cousin once removed)

Formula One World Championship career
- Nationality: (Italy) Italian
- Active years: 1986–1990
- Team(s): Minardi, Benetton
- Entries: 78 (76 starts)
- Championships: 0
- Wins: 1
- Podiums: 9
- Career points: 65
- Pole positions: 0
- Fastest laps: 2
- First entry: 1986 Brazilian Grand Prix
- First win: 1989 Japanese Grand Prix
- Last entry: 1990 Spanish Grand Prix

Alessandro "Sandro" Nannini (born 7 July 1959) is an Italian former racing driver, who competed in Formula One from 1986 to 1990. Nannini won the 1989 Japanese Grand Prix with Benetton.

Born in Siena, Nannini is the younger brother of musician Gianna Nannini. He began his career rallying in a Lancia Stratos before switching to open-wheel racing in 1981. The following year, he started competing for Minardi in European Formula Two, where he remained for three seasons. Nannini also made appearances in the World Sportscar Championship for Martini, winning the 1000km of Kyalami in 1984 and entering three editions of the 24 Hours of Le Mans. He was granted an FIA Super License in 1986—having been controversially denied one the year prior—and made his Formula One debut at the Brazilian Grand Prix with Minardi. After 26 retirements in 30 starts across two seasons at Minardi, Nannini joined Benetton to partner Thierry Boutsen. He retained his seat in 1989 after scoring podiums at the British and Spanish Grands Prix. Nannini took his only victory in Formula One at the Japanese Grand Prix, inheriting the win from Ayrton Senna following his infamous disqualification. Several podiums followed in 1990 as he was partnered by Nelson Piquet, including a second-placed finish at the German Grand Prix.

In October 1990, Nannini's right forearm was severed in a helicopter accident at his vineyard in Siena, ending his Formula One career with one win, two fastest laps and nine podiums. He returned to racing in 1993, competing in four seasons of the Deutsche Tourenwagen Meisterschaft—later known as the International Touring Car Championship—with Alfa Corse, finishing third in the 1996 standings. Nannini became a race-winner in the 1997 FIA GT Championship with Mercedes, before retiring at the end of the year.

== Biography ==
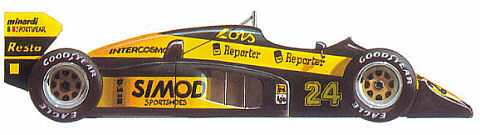
The Minardi M187 driven by Nannini for the 1987 season

Nannini was born in Siena on 7 July 1959. He began racing in a Lancia Stratos at national rally events before switching to Formula Italia in 1981 and winning the championship in his first year. From 1982 to 1984, he raced for Minardi in Formula 2, attracting some attention for his speed in the uncompetitive car. Though his best season saw him only seventh overall in 1983, he was signed by Lancia to drive their fast but fragile LC2 prototype in the World Sportscar Championship, setting fastest lap at the 1984 24 Hours of Le Mans (set while battling for the race lead with the Kremer Racing Porsche 956 of 1980 F1 World Champion Alan Jones about four hours after the start) where he finished eighth with Frenchman Bob Wollek, and later that year winning the 1984 1000 km of Kyalami with Riccardo Patrese.

After three seasons (1982, 1983 and 1984) as their F2 driver, for 1985, Nannini was Giancarlo Minardi's first choice to drive his new Formula One car, but he was controversially denied a Super Licence by the sports governing body FISA, with his former F2 teammate Pierluigi Martini taking the drive instead. After this, Nannini continued with Lancia in the 1985 World Sportscar Championship. With his best results being third placings in round 2 (Monza) and 3 (Silverstone), both times paired with Patrese, he finished 8th in the Drivers' Championship.

For 1986, Nannini was finally granted a Super Licence and signed up with Minardi's Grand Prix team, where he stayed until 1987. The car was uncompetitive and unreliable (Nannini was classified only four times from 30 starts with the team), largely due to its disappointing Motori Moderni V6 engine. However, Nannini's raw speed and talent was noticed by many, especially after he largely outperformed the more experienced Andrea de Cesaris in 1986 (to the point where de Cesaris would demand to have Nannini's car if his younger teammate was faster than him). The following year, in his spare time, Nannini paired with veteran road race driver Giorgio Marin to win the 1987 Mille Miglia.

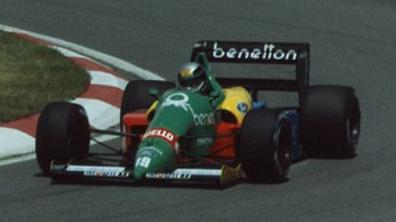
Nannini driving for Benetton at the 1988 Canadian Grand Prix.

Benetton signed Nannini for 1988 to drive alongside Thierry Boutsen. He generally performed very well, often out-pacing the highly regarded Belgian if not matching his consistency. He scored his first point in his second race for the team and took two third places on his way to tenth overall in the championship.

With Boutsen leaving for Williams, Nannini was promoted to team leader at Benetton alongside young Englishman Johnny Herbert and delivered a number of strong performances, especially at Suzuka. There he lay third behind the two McLaren's of Ayrton Senna and Alain Prost when they collided, giving Nannini the lead. Prost retired whereas Senna rejoined after being push-started and pitted to replace his front wing, trailing Nannini in the race. Nannini was eventually passed by Senna who went on to cross the finish line first, however, the Brazilian was subsequently disqualified for missing the chicane following his collision with Prost. The disqualification handed Nannini what proved to be his only Formula One win. He rounded off the season with an impressive second place in torrential rain at Adelaide, moving him to sixth overall in the championship.

For 1990, Nannini was joined in the team by triple World Champion Nelson Piquet and reverted to being the number two driver. However, he impressed by largely matching the pace of the more illustrious Brazilian. At Hockenheim he led the race by deciding against stopping for tyres, his Benetton-Ford V8 resisting the more powerful McLaren-Honda V10 of Ayrton Senna for 16 laps before fading grip dropped him to second (Senna had already pitted for tyres which was what had handed Nannini the lead). He also challenged at the following Hungarian Grand Prix, hounding leader and former teammate Thierry Boutsen (on his way to his third and last F1GP win) until being controversially pushed off the track and into retirement by the following Senna.

On 12 October 1990, the week after the Spanish Grand Prix, where he had finished third, Nannini was involved in a helicopter crash at his Siena vineyard when the ground beneath the landing helicopter gave way. In the ensuing accident, Nannini suffered a severed right forearm. The injury healed thanks to microsurgery but it ended his Formula One career. Nannini had been reconfirmed by Benetton for 1991 but Ferrari had a long-standing interest in the driver and were considering him as a replacement for the departing Nigel Mansell, while it was also know that McLaren boss Ron Dennis had also been keeping an eye on him.

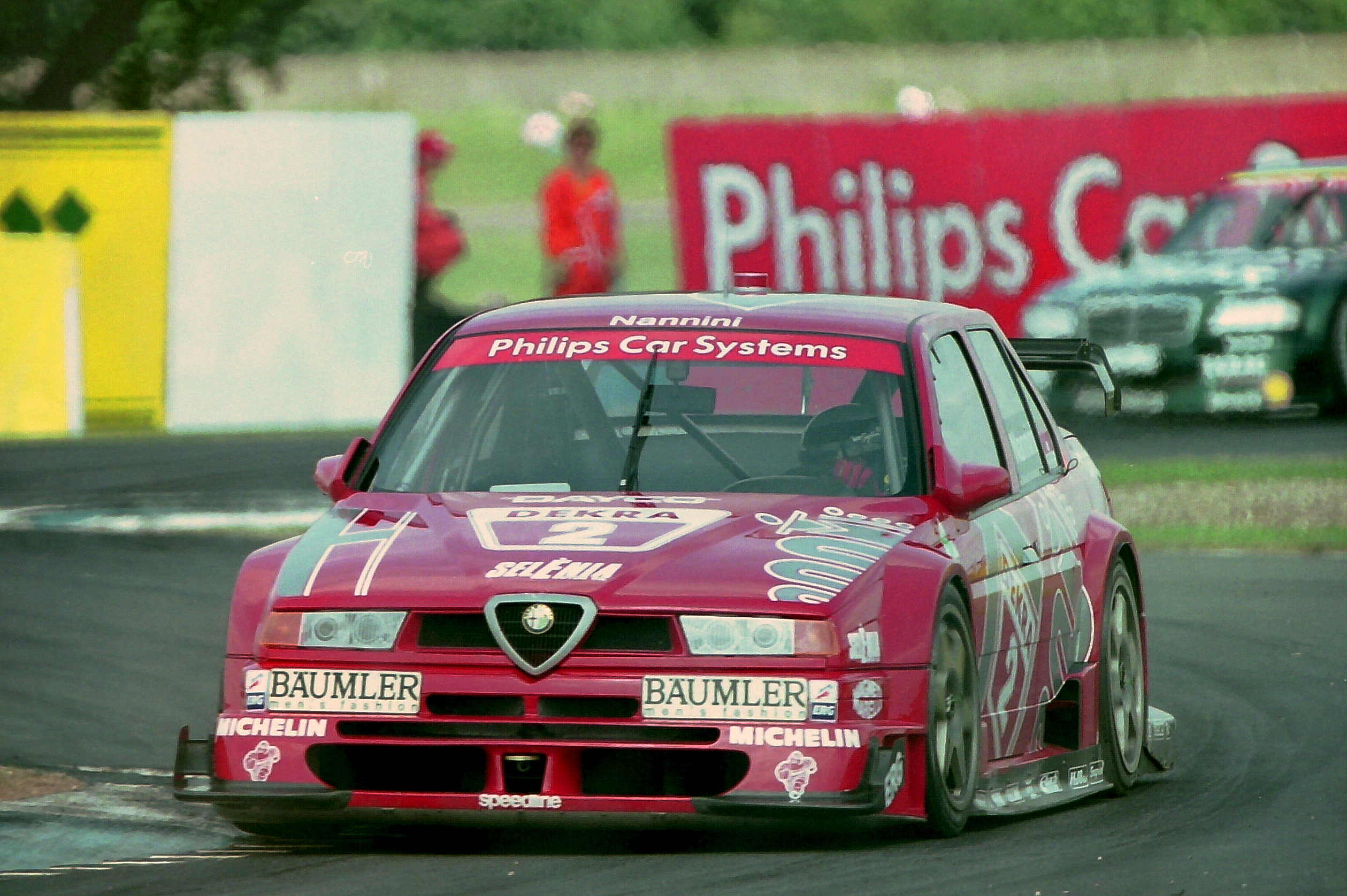
Nannini driving for Alfa Romeo at Donington Park during the 1994 Deutsche Tourenwagen Meisterschaft season.

Once sufficiently recovered, Ferrari offered Nannini a test drive on its private Fiorano Circuit in 1992. Nannini completed a total of 38 laps driving Jean Alesi's Ferrari F92A, which featured a specially modified steering wheel. In 1996, Benetton's Flavio Briatore also honoured the promise of a test drive, which took place at Estoril aboard a B196.

Despite only regaining partial use of his right hand, Nannini was able to carve out a career in touring car racing with Alfa Romeo in the 1990s, placing fourth overall in the 1994 DTM championship and third in the 1996 International Touring Car Championship.

Nannini competed for Mercedes in the 1997 FIA GT Championship, finishing sixth overall and winning a race at Suzuka, before hanging up his helmet. He now runs a chain of upmarket cafes bearing his name, with branches as far flung as Indonesia.

2007 saw Nannini's return to the track after a decade in retirement. He agreed to take part in the short-lived Grand Prix Masters championship for Formula One veterans, which included former Benetton teammate Johnny Herbert.

Nannini is a member of the Italy–USA Foundation.

Matteo Nannini, a son of a first cousin of Alessandro, is also a racing driver, and has raced at the Formula 3 level as recently as 2021, as well as having competed in Indy NXT in 2023 and 2026.

== Racing record ==
=== Career summary ===
Season	Series	Team	Races	Wins	Poles	F/Laps	Podiums	Points	Position
1981	Formula Italia		?	?	?	?	?	?	**1st**
1982	European Formula Two	Minardi	12	0	0	0	1	8	10th
1982	World Sportscar Championship	Martini Racing	1	0	0	0	1	16	18th
1983	European Formula Two	Minardi	12	0	0	0	1	11	7th
1983	World Sportscar Championship	Martini Racing	2	0	0	0	1	15	22nd
1984	European Formula Two	Minardi	11	0	0	0	1	9	10th
1984	World Sportscar Championship	Martini Racing	5	1	1	2	2	35	16th
1985	World Sportscar Championship	Martini Racing	7	0	5	0	2	50	8th
1986	Formula One	Minardi Team	14	0	0	0	0	0	NC
1986	World Sportscar Championship	Martini Racing	2	0	2	1	1	15	34th
1986	World Sportscar Championship	Porsche Kremer Racing	1	0	0	0	0	15	34th
1987	Formula One	Minardi Team	16	0	0	0	0	0	NC
1987	World Touring Car Championship	Alfa Corse	4	0	0	0	0	59	24th
1988	Formula One	Benetton Formula Ltd.	16	0	0	1	2	12	10th
1989	Formula One	Benetton Formula Ltd.	16	1	0	0	4	32	6th
1990	Formula One	Benetton Formula Ltd.	14	0	0	1	2	21	8th
1993	Deutsche Tourenwagen Meisterschaft	Alfa Corse	21	2	3	2	5	121	8th
1994	Deutsche Tourenwagen Meisterschaft	Alfa Corse	24	5	3	3	5	149	4th
1995	Deutsche Tourenwagen Meisterschaft	Alfa Corse	13	0	0	0	2	44	11th
1995	International Touring Car Championship	Alfa Corse	8	0	0	0	0	17	15th
1996	International Touring Car Championship	Martini Alfa Corse	24	7	6	7	7	180	**3rd**
1997	FIA GT Championship	AMG-Mercedes	11	1	1	0	5	34	5th

=== Complete European Formula Two Championship results ===
(key) (Races in bold indicate pole position; races in italics indicate fastest lap)

Year	Entrant	Chassis	Engine	1	2	3	4	5	6	7	8	9	10	11	12	13	Pos.	Pts
1982	Minardi Team Srl	Minardi Fly 281B	BMW	SIL; 5	HOC; 9	THR; 12	NÜR; 8	MUG; 10	VAL; Ret	PAU; DNQ	SPA; Ret	HOC; Ret	DON; DSQ	MAN; Ret	PER; Ret	MIS; 2	10th	8
1983	Minardi Team Srl	Minardi M283	BMW	SIL	THR; 9	HOC; 5	NÜR; 2	VAL; 7	PAU; Ret	JAR; Ret	DON; Ret	MIS; Ret	PER; 11	ZOL; Ret	MUG; 4		7th	11
1984	Minardi Team Srl	Minardi M283	BMW	SIL; 9	HOC; Ret	THR; 7	VAL; Ret	MUG; Ret	PAU; Ret	HOC; 4	MIS; Ret	PER; 3	DON; 10	BRH; 5			10th	9

=== 24 Hours of Le Mans results ===
Year	Team	Co-Drivers	Car	Class	Laps	Pos.	Class Pos.
1983	(Italy) Martini Racing	(Italy) Paolo Barilla (France) Jean-Claude Andruet	Lancia LC2-Ferrari	C	135	DNF	DNF
1984	(Italy) Martini Racing	(France) Bob Wollek	Lancia LC2-Ferrari	C1	326	8th	8th
1985	(Italy) Martini Racing	(France) Bob Wollek (Australia) Lucio Cesario	Lancia LC2-Ferrari	C1	360	6th	6th

=== Complete Formula One results ===
(key) (Races in italics indicate fastest lap)

Year	Entrant	Chassis	Engine	1	2	3	4	5	6	7	8	9	10	11	12	13	14	15	16	WDC	Pts
1986	Minardi Team	Minardi M185B	Motori Moderni Tipo 615–90 1.5 V6t	BRA; Ret	ESP; DNS	SMR; Ret	MON; DNQ	BEL; Ret	CAN; Ret	DET; Ret	FRA; Ret	GBR; Ret	GER; Ret	HUN; Ret		ITA; Ret	POR; Ret	MEX; 14	AUS; Ret	NC	0
1986	Minardi Team	Minardi M186	Motori Moderni Tipo 615–90 1.5 V6t												AUT; Ret					NC	0
1987	Minardi Team	Minardi M187	Motori Moderni Tipo 615–90 1.5 V6t	BRA; Ret	SMR; Ret	BEL; Ret	MON; Ret	DET; Ret	FRA; Ret	GBR; Ret	GER; Ret	HUN; 11	AUT; Ret	ITA; 16	POR; 11	ESP; Ret	MEX; Ret	JPN; Ret	AUS; Ret	NC	0
1988	Benetton Formula Ltd.	Benetton B188	Ford Cosworth DFR 3.5 V8	BRA; Ret	SMR; 6	MON; Ret	MEX; 7	CAN; Ret	DET; Ret	FRA; 6	GBR; 3	GER; 18	HUN; Ret	BEL; DSQ	ITA; 9	POR; Ret	ESP; 3	JPN; 5	AUS; Ret	10th	12
1989	Benetton Formula Ltd.	Benetton B188	Ford Cosworth DFR 3.5 V8	BRA; 6	SMR; 3	MON; 8	MEX; 4	USA; Ret	CAN; DSQ											6th	32
1989	Benetton Formula Ltd.	Benetton B189	Ford HBA1/4 3.5 V8							FRA; Ret	GBR; 3	GER; Ret	HUN; Ret	BEL; 5	ITA; Ret	POR; 4	ESP; Ret	JPN; 1	AUS; 2	6th	32
1990	Benetton Formula Ltd.	Benetton B189B	Ford HBA4 3.5 V8	USA; 11	BRA; 10															8th	21
1990	Benetton Formula Ltd.	Benetton B190	Ford HBA4 3.5 V8			SMR; 3	MON; Ret	CAN; Ret	MEX; 4	FRA; 16	GBR; Ret	GER; 2	HUN; Ret	BEL; 4	ITA; 8	POR; 6	ESP; 3	JPN	AUS	8th	21

=== Complete Deutsche Tourenwagen Meisterschaft results ===
(key) (Races in bold indicate pole position; races in italics indicate fastest lap)

Year	Team	Car	1	2	3	4	5	6	7	8	9	10	11	12	13	14	15	16	17	18	19	20	21	22	23	24	Pos.	Pts
1993	Alfa Corse	Alfa Romeo 155 V6 Ti	ZOL; 1 Ret	ZOL; 2; 3	**HOC**; **1**; 13	HOC; 2; 8	NÜR; 1; 10	NÜR; 2; 4	WUN; 1; 2	WUN; 2 Ret	NÜR; 1; 4	NÜR; 2; 4	NOR; 1 Ret	NOR; 2 Ret	DON; 1 Ret	DON; 2 DNS	DIE; 1 Ret	DIE; 2; 18	ALE; 1; 3	ALE; 2 Ret	**AVU**; **1**; 5	AVU; 2 Ret	HOC; 1; 1	**HOC**; **2**; 1			8th	121
1994	Alfa Corse	Alfa Romeo 155 V6 Ti	ZOL; 1; 1	**ZOL**; **2**; 1	HOC; 1; 4	HOC; 2; 1	NÜR; 1; 7	NÜR; 2; 7	MUG; 1; 17	MUG; 2 Ret	NÜR; 1; 1	**NÜR**; **2**; 7	NOR; 1 Ret	NOR; 2; 7	DON; 1; 1	**DON**; **2** DSQ	DIE; 1; 5	DIE; 2; 4	NÜR; 1; 8	NÜR; 2; 5	AVU; 1; 19	AVU; 2; 5	ALE; 1 Ret	ALE; 2; 12	HOC; 1; 6	HOC; 2 Ret	4th	149
1995	Alfa Corse	Alfa Romeo 155 V6 Ti	HOC; 1; 18	HOC; 2 DNS	AVU; 1; 3	AVU; 2 Ret	NOR; 1; 3	NOR; 2; 9†	DIE; 1; 4	DIE; 2 Ret	NÜR; 1 Ret	NÜR; 2 Ret	ALE; 1; 11	ALE; 2 Ret	HOC; 1; 5	HOC; 2; 12											11th	44
Sources:

- † — Retired, but was classified as he completed 90% of the winner's race distance.

=== Complete International Touring Car Championship results ===
(key) (Races in bold indicate pole position; races in italics indicate fastest lap)

Year	Team	Car	1	2	3	4	5	6	7	8	9	10	11	12	13	14	15	16	17	18	19	20	21	22	23	24	25	26	Pos.	Pts
1995	Alfa Corse	Alfa Romeo 155 V6 Ti	MUG; 1; 5	MUG; 2 Ret	HEL; 1 Ret	HEL; 2 Ret	DON; 1 DNS	DON; 2 DNS	EST; 1; 8	EST; 2; 7	MAG; 1 Ret	MAG; 2; 9																	15th	17
1996	Martini Alfa Corse	Alfa Romeo 155 V6 Ti	HOC; 1; 10	HOC; 2; 13	NÜR; 1 EX	NÜR; 2 EX	**EST**; **1**; 1	**EST**; **2**; 1	HEL; 1; 14	HEL; 2; 4	NOR; 1 Ret	NOR; 2 Ret	DIE; 1; 6	DIE; 2 Ret	SIL; 1; 17	SIL; 2; 11	**NÜR**; **1**; 1	**NÜR**; **2**; 1	MAG; 1; 1	**MAG**; **2**; 1	MUG; 1; 11	MUG; 2 Ret	HOC; 1; 6	HOC; 2 Ret	INT; 1; 1	**INT**; **2**; 5	SUZ; 1; 10	SUZ; 2; 5	3rd	180

=== Complete FIA GT Championship results ===
(key) (Races in bold indicate pole position; races in italics indicate fastest lap)

Year	Entrant	Class	Chassis	Engine	1	2	3	4	5	6	7	8	9	10	11	Pos.	Points
1997	AMG Mercedes	GT1	Mercedes-Benz CLK GTR	Mercedes-Benz LS600 6.0L V12	HOC; 13	SIL; 13	HEL; 11	NÜR; 2	SPA; 11	**A1R**; 2	SUZ; 1	DON; 2	MUG; 2	SEB; Ret	LAG; 8	5th	34

== See also ==
- Formula One drivers from Italy
