= M186 =

M186 may refer to:

- M-186 (Michigan highway), a state highway
- Mercedes-Benz M186 engine, an automobile engine
- Minardi M186, a Formula One race car
