= Minardi M186 =

Formula One racing car

- Category: Formula One
- Constructor: Minardi
- Designer: Giacomo Caliri
- Predecessor: M185
- Successor: M187

Technical specifications
- Chassis: Carbon fibre monocoque
- Axle track: Front: Rear:
- Engine: Motori Moderni 615-90 1,499 cc (91.5 cu in), 90° V6, turbo, mid-engine, longitudinally mounted
- Transmission: manual
- Fuel: Agip
- Tyres: Pirelli

Competition history
- Notable entrants: Minardi F1 Team
- Notable drivers: 23. (Italy) Andrea de Cesaris; 24. (Italy) Alessandro Nannini
- Debut: 1986 Hungarian Grand Prix
Races	Wins	Poles	F/Laps
6	0	0	0
- Constructors' Championships: 0
- Drivers' Championships: 0

The Minardi M186 was a Formula One car, designed for Minardi by Giacomo Caliri for use in the 1986 season. Introduced partway through the year and driven by Andrea de Cesaris, it was an unreliable car and only finished one race.

== Development ==
Designed by Giacomo Caliri, only one example of the M186 was built for the Minardi team. It had a carbon fibre monocoque and was powered by the Motori Moderni V6 engine, which had been used in the M186's predecessor, the Minardi M185B.

== Race history ==
The M186 was introduced partway through the 1986 Formula One season, at the Hungarian Grand Prix and was raced by Andrea de Cesaris for the rest of the year except for the Austrian Grand Prix, where Alessandro Nannini drove it.

The M186 was marginally better in qualifying than the M185B, and it had a best qualifying position of 11th, in the Australian Grand Prix, the team's best grid placing in its history at the time. However, like the M185B, the car was very unreliable and only finished one race, an eighth place at the Mexican Grand Prix. This was also de Cesaris' only finish of the year.

== Livery ==
The M186 retained the black and yellow colour scheme from the previous season. The main sponsors were the footwear brand Simod and fashion company Gilmar, both from Italy.

== Complete Formula One results ==
(key) (Results in bold indicate pole position; results in italics indicate fastest lap.)

Year	Team	Chassis	Engine(s)	Tyres	Driver	1	2	3	4	5	6	7	8	9	10	11	12	13	14	15	16	Pts.	WCC
1986	Minardi F1 Team	M186	Motori Moderni 615-90; V6 tc	**P**		BRA	ESP	SMR	MON	BEL	CAN	DET	FRA	GBR	GER	HUN	AUT	ITA	EUR	MEX	AUS	0	NC
1986	Minardi F1 Team	M186	Motori Moderni 615-90; V6 tc	**P**	(Italy) Andrea de Cesaris											Ret		Ret	Ret	8	Ret	0	NC
1986	Minardi F1 Team	M186	Motori Moderni 615-90; V6 tc	**P**	(Italy) Alessandro Nannini												Ret					0	NC
