= Motori Moderni =

Formula One engine manufacturer of the 1980s

Motori Moderni as a Formula One engine manufacturer
- Founder(s): Carlo Chiti

Formula One World Championship career
- First entry: 1985 San Marino Grand Prix
- Last entry: 1987 Australian Grand Prix
- Races entered: 46 (44 starts)
- Chassis: Minardi, AGS
- Constructors' Championships: 0
- Drivers' Championships: 0
- Race victories: 0
- Podiums: 0
- Points: 0
- Pole positions: 0
- Fastest laps: 0

Motori Moderni (Modern Engines) was a Formula One engine manufacturer from 1985 until the end of 1987. It was established in Novara by Italian engine designer Carlo Chiti.

Chiti, a former Ferrari, Automobili Turismo e Sport and Alfa Romeo Formula One chief designer, founded Motori Moderni with the idea of supplying custom turbocharged V6 engines, also known as Tipo 615-90, to Formula One teams. The engines were used by Minardi in Formula One from 1985 to 1987 and by AGS in 1986.

== V6 Turbo ==
=== 1985 ===
Motori Moderni's power unit debuted at the 1985 San Marino Grand Prix with the newly born Minardi Formula One team. Rookie Pierluigi Martini qualified the M185 19th on the grid but was forced to retire after 14 laps. Martini failed to score a point in 1985 with a best finish of 8th and last in the season-ending Australian Grand Prix. The Motori Moderni engine weighed in at 147 kg (324 lb) and produced 720 PS (530 kW; 710 bhp) in race trim, with another 100 horsepower possible for qualifying. This compared unfavourably to the approximately 1,000 PS (740 kW; 990 bhp) of the Renault, Honda and BMW turbo engines, and the 900 PS (660 kW; 890 bhp) of the TAG-Porsche and Ferrari engines. At Silverstone for the British Grand Prix, Martini was 8.054 seconds slower than Keke Rosberg's pole-winning Williams-Honda (Rosberg had set the pole at an average of 258.9 km/h [160.9 mph], the fastest ever turbo lap speed). At the Österreichring in Austria he was 11.2 seconds slower than Alain Prost's McLaren TAG-Porsche, while at Monza in Italy he was 8.8 seconds slower than Ayrton Senna's Lotus-Renault.

=== 1986 ===
In 1986, as the Minardi team expanded to running two cars, Martini was replaced with Andrea de Cesaris, and paired with F1 rookie Alessandro Nannini, who showed his class by often outpacing his more experienced countryman. Again, no points were scored with the Motori Moderni engines rated at approximately 780 bhp (582 kW; 791 PS) next to the leading Honda, BMW, Ferrari, Renault and TAG-Porsche units which were producing well over 950 bhp (708 kW; 963 PS) in race trim (the BMW was said to be the most powerful qualifying engine at around 1,400 bhp (1,044 kW; 1,419 PS)).

The AGS team was Motori Moderni's second customer. The team only participated in two races during the 1986 season, with Ivan Capelli retiring from both the Italian and Portuguese Grands Prix.

=== 1987 ===
1987 would be the last season the Motori Moderni engine would be used in Formula One. Minardi, who had retained Nannini after an impressive debut season, replaced de Cesaris (who had moved to Brabham) with Spanish driver Adrián Campos. Once more no points were scored throughout the season, despite some spirited drives by Nannini which only resulted in 11th-placed finishes in Hungary and Portugal. The engines, now rated at 800 bhp (597 kW; 811 PS) after the introduction of the FIA's mandatory pop-off valve aimed at limiting the turbos power to 4.0 bar, were often struggling against the 575 bhp (429 kW; 583 PS) V8 Cosworth DFZ powered cars.

At the 1987 Australian Grand Prix in Adelaide, Nannini qualified an impressive 13th on the grid only 3.434 behind Gerhard Berger's pole-winning Ferrari. Unfortunately, his race only lasted a few hundred metres as he was pushed into the fence just out of the chicane after the start. Campos qualified 26th and last (3.42 seconds slower than Nannini), with his race ending with transmission failure after 46 of the scheduled 82 laps.

With 1988 being the final year for the turbos in Formula One (until 2014), Motori Moderni pulled out of the sport at the end of 1987 rather than try to adapt the engine for an even lower pop-off valve limit of 2.5 bar and a lower fuel limit of just 150 litres. As a result, Minardi switched to the Cosworth DFZ engine in 1988.

== Subaru ==
In late 1988 Chiti was commissioned by Subaru to design a new 12-cylinder boxer engine, known as the 1235 for the new 3.5-litre normally aspirated F1 regulations. This was briefly tested by Minardi in 1989 but rejected due to low power and excessive weight. The Japanese car company then bought the Coloni team but withdrew and sold the team back to Enzo Coloni at the end of the season. The engine was later adopted in the 1989 Jiotto Caspita prototype sports car before it was used by Subaru for the 1990 season.

== Sportscar racing ==
After abandoning Formula One, the flat-12 engines were deployed in the Alba Racing Team's AR20 entry in the 1990 World Sportscar Championship, but failed to start any rounds before being replaced by a more conventional 4.5-litre engine from Buick.

== Complete Formula One World Championship results ==
(key) (results in bold indicate pole position; results in italics indicate fastest lap)

Year	Entrant	Chassis	Engine	Tyres	Drivers	1	2	3	4	5	6	7	8	9	10	11	12	13	14	15	16	WCC	Points
1985	Minardi Team SpA	Minardi M185	Motori Moderni Tipo 615-90 1.5 V6t	P		BRA	POR	SMR	MON	CAN	DET	FRA	GBR	GER	AUT	NED	ITA	BEL	EUR	RSA	AUS	—	0
1985	Minardi Team SpA	Minardi M185	Motori Moderni Tipo 615-90 1.5 V6t	P	(Italy) Pierluigi Martini			Ret	DNQ	Ret	Ret	Ret	Ret	11^{†}	Ret	Ret	Ret	12	Ret	Ret	8	—	0
1986	Minardi Team SpA	Minardi M185B M186	Motori Moderni Tipo 615-90 1.5 V6t	P		BRA	ESP	SMR	MON	BEL	CAN	DET	FRA	GBR	GER	HUN	AUT	ITA	POR	MEX	AUS	—	0
1986	Minardi Team SpA	Minardi M185B M186	Motori Moderni Tipo 615-90 1.5 V6t	P	(Italy) Andrea de Cesaris	Ret	Ret	Ret	DNQ	Ret	Ret	Ret	Ret	Ret	Ret	Ret	Ret	Ret	Ret	8	Ret	—	0
1986	Minardi Team SpA	Minardi M185B M186	Motori Moderni Tipo 615-90 1.5 V6t	P	(Italy) Alessandro Nannini	Ret	Ret	Ret	DNQ	Ret	Ret	Ret	Ret	Ret	Ret	Ret	Ret	Ret	NC	14	Ret	—	0
1986	Jolly Club SpA	AGS JH21C	Motori Moderni Tipo 615-90 1.5 V6t	G	(Italy) Ivan Capelli													Ret	Ret			—	0
1987	Minardi Team SpA	Minardi M187	Motori Moderni Tipo 615-90 1.5 V6t	G		BRA	SMR	BEL	MON	DET	FRA	GBR	GER	HUN	AUT	ITA	POR	ESP	MEX	JPN	AUS	—	0
1987	Minardi Team SpA	Minardi M187	Motori Moderni Tipo 615-90 1.5 V6t	G	(Spain) Adrián Campos	DSQ	Ret	Ret	DNS	Ret	Ret	Ret	Ret	Ret	Ret	Ret	Ret	14	Ret	Ret	Ret	—	0
1987	Minardi Team SpA	Minardi M187	Motori Moderni Tipo 615-90 1.5 V6t	G	(Italy) Alessandro Nannini	Ret	Ret	Ret	Ret	Ret	Ret	Ret	Ret	11	Ret	16	11^{†}	Ret	Ret	Ret	Ret	—	0

^{†} — Driver did not finish the Grand Prix but was classified as he completed over 90% of the race distance.
