= Giancarlo Minardi =

Formula One team owner

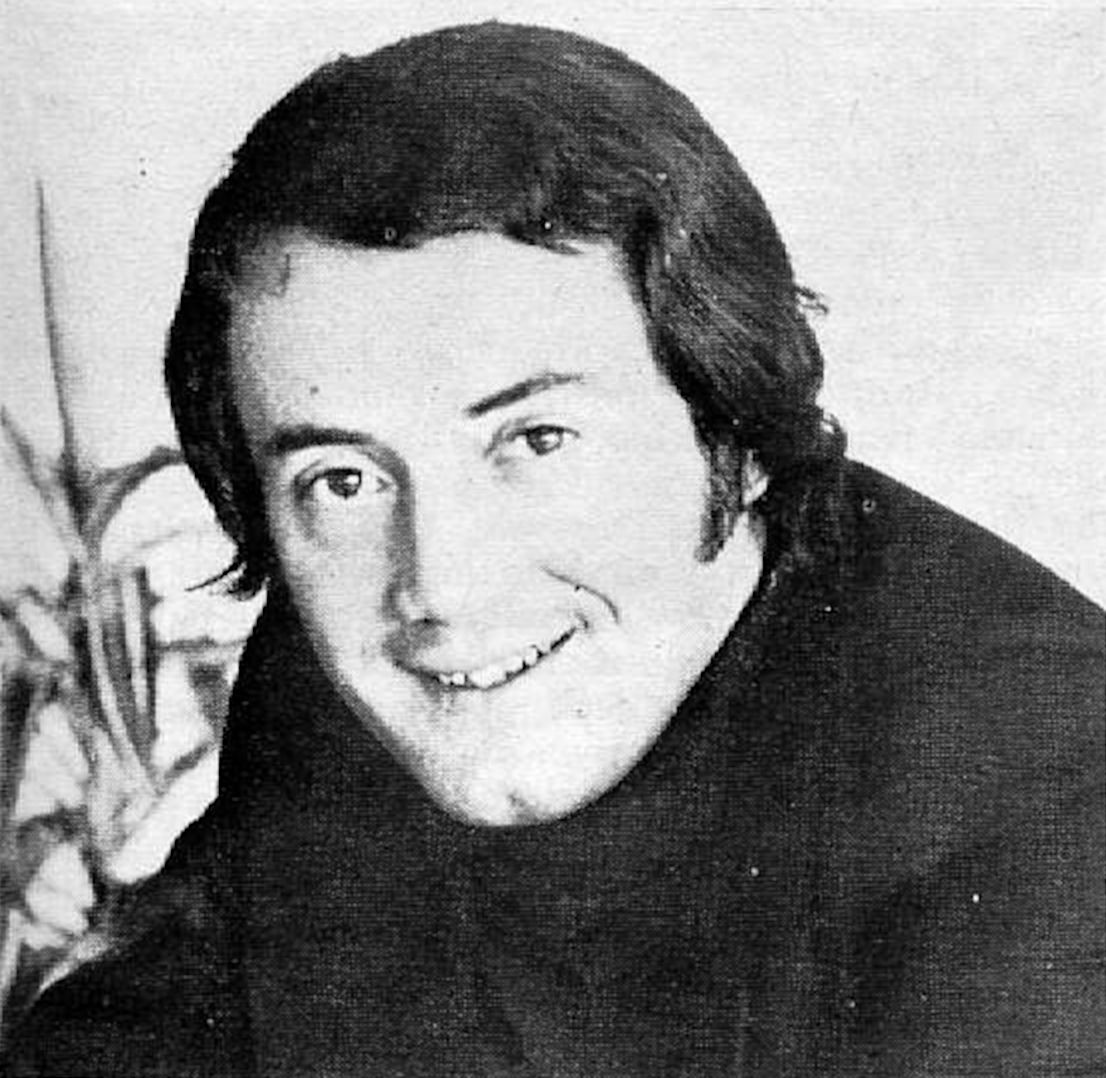
- Minardi in 1974
- Born: September 18, 1947 (age 78); Faenza, Italy
- Known for: Founding Minardi Formula One team

Giancarlo Minardi (born 18 September 1947) is an Italian businessman who was the founder and managing director of the now-defunct Minardi Formula One team.

== Early life ==
Minardi was born in Faenza, Italy and has spent his early years connected to the automotive industry through his father. As a young boy, his family managed a Fiat dealership and an Agip fuel station, and currently manages Iveco and Selenia dealerships. His father, Giovanni Minardi, who died when Giancarlo was young, was heavily involved in motor racing. Minardi began his career as a business man, running a successful truck dealership in Italy.

== Introduction to racing ==
He began his racing career in 1968, buying a Faccioli tuned Fiat 500, achieving good results in the various hillclimbs he competed in. Subsequently he began rallying a Fiat 124, after which he turned his attention to leading the Scuderia del Passatore racing team. Between 1972 and 1974 he led the team to good results in Formula Italia, being runner-up in the 1972 championship and then in 1973 going on to win the title with Giancarlo Martini as driver. After a name change to Scuderia Everest in 1975, his team raced a BMW-March in the European Formula Two Championship for two years.

In 1980 he formed the Minardi racing team with financial backing from well known Italian motor racing patron Piero Mancini. Giancarlo led the Minardi team to four successful Formula Two seasons, the most notable success being a 1981 win at the Misano round with Michele Alboreto.

== Formula One ==
Formula One was the next logical step for Minardi in 1985. In 1991, Ferrari provided Minardi with V12 engines.

=== Merge with Scuderia Italia ===
Money woes hit and in 1994 Minardi joined his team with Scuderia Italia in an effort to survive. In 1996 money ran short again and by year's end Minardi was forced to sell 70% of his team to a new investor consortium. Giancarlo retained 14.5% with the remaining 15.5% distributed between the Scuderia Italia investors (Emilio Gnutti, Giuseppe Lucchini and Vittorio Palazzani) and Defendente Marniga. In an attempt to help saving the team Flavio Briatore became the main shareholder after a deal brokered by Bernie Ecclestone. In 1997 Gabriele Rumi from Fondmetal entered as a major partner. Minardi and Rumi shared the General Director role from 1997 to 2000.

=== Red Bull takeover ===
2001 saw another change in the ownership of the Minardi team with Australian Paul Stoddart buying the company, although Giancarlo retained the role of Managing Director, with particular emphasis on the development of young drivers. He left Minardi after the takeover and renaming to Scuderia Toro Rosso by the Red Bull energy drink concern in 2006. Subsequently he offered support to both Minardi Team by GP Racing in Euro F3000 and Minardi Piquet Sports in GP2 resulting in significant success for both teams, most notably with Nelson Piquet Jr. himself in GP2 who finished runner up to Lewis Hamilton in the 2006 championship.

=== Driver development ===
Driver development is an area in which Giancarlo is considered to have significant aptitude. He has identified and given breaks to many drivers who subsequently went on to achieve successes with other teams and in other formulas. Drivers such as Giancarlo Fisichella, Fernando Alonso, Mark Webber and Jarno Trulli all had their Formula One debut with Minardi.

== Later life ==
Giancarlo currently resides in Faenza, Italy. He is married to Mara and has one son named after his father Giovanni. His son runs the driver management firm Minardi Management, who represents most notably Mercedes F1 driver Kimi Antonelli. He has two brothers: Giuseppe, who has taken over the Fiat dealership (bankrupt in 2010) and Nando who now runs the truck concession. Giancarlo was the chairman of the football club Faenza Calcio.

In 2010, he ran for Mayor of Faenza.

In 2021, he became the president of the Imola Circuit.

In 2022, he became the President of the FIA's Single Seater Commission.
