= 1985 European Grand Prix =

Fourteenth round of the 1985 Formula One World Championship

- Race 14 of 16 in the 1985 Formula One World Championship

Race details
- Date: 6 October 1985
- Official name: Shell Oils Grand Prix of Europe
- Location: Brands Hatch, Kent, United Kingdom
- Course: Permanent racing facility
- Course length: 4.206 km (2.61 miles)
- Distance: 75 laps, 315.5 km (195.8 miles)

Pole position
Driver	(Brazil) Ayrton Senna	Lotus-Renault
- Time: 1:07.169

Fastest lap
Driver	(France) Jacques Laffite	Ligier-Renault
- Time: 1:11.526 on lap 55

Podium
First	(United Kingdom) Nigel Mansell	Williams-Honda
Second	(Brazil) Ayrton Senna	Lotus-Renault
Third	(Finland) Keke Rosberg	Williams-Honda

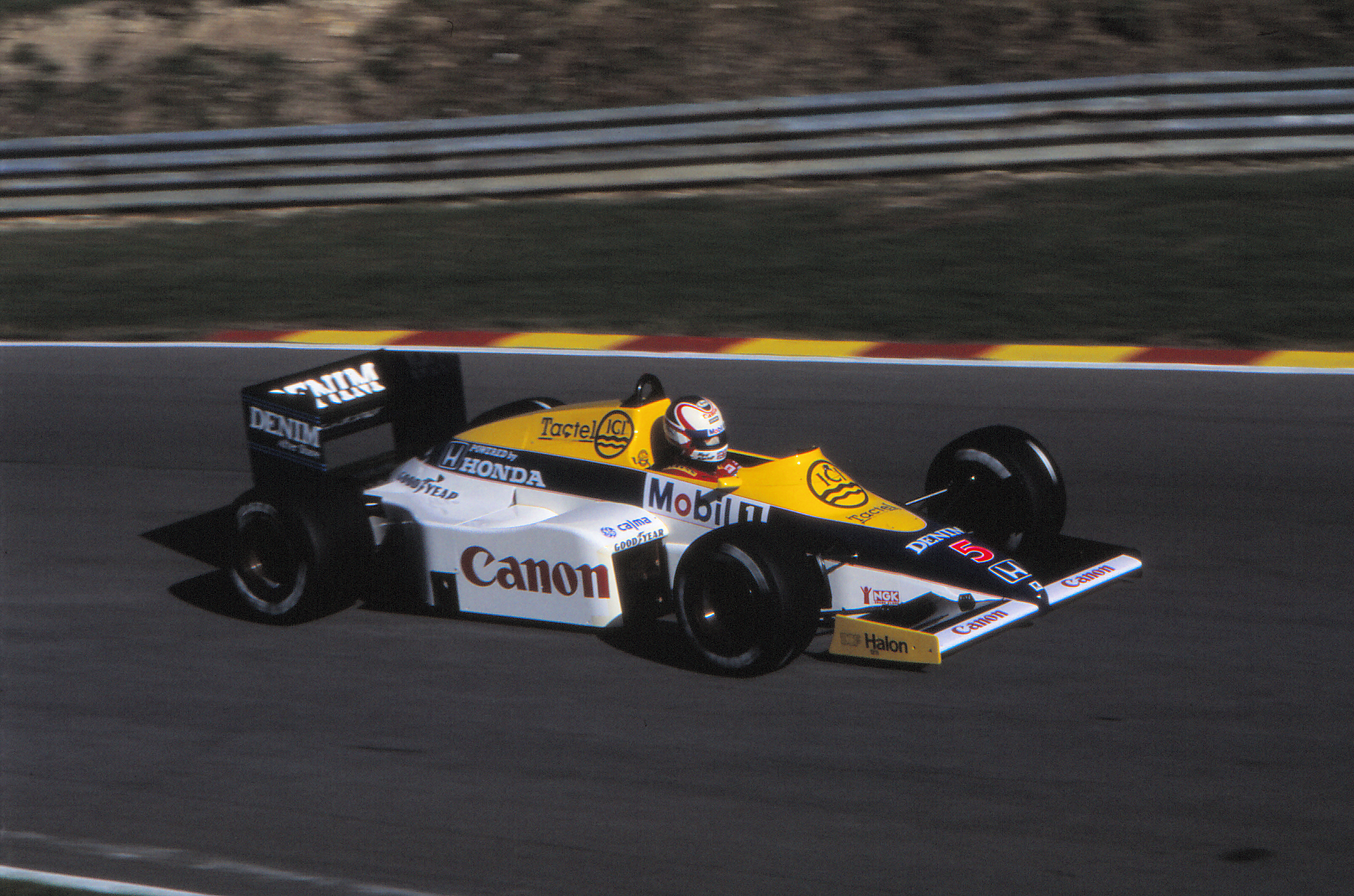
Nigel Mansell, driving for Williams, took his first Formula One victory.

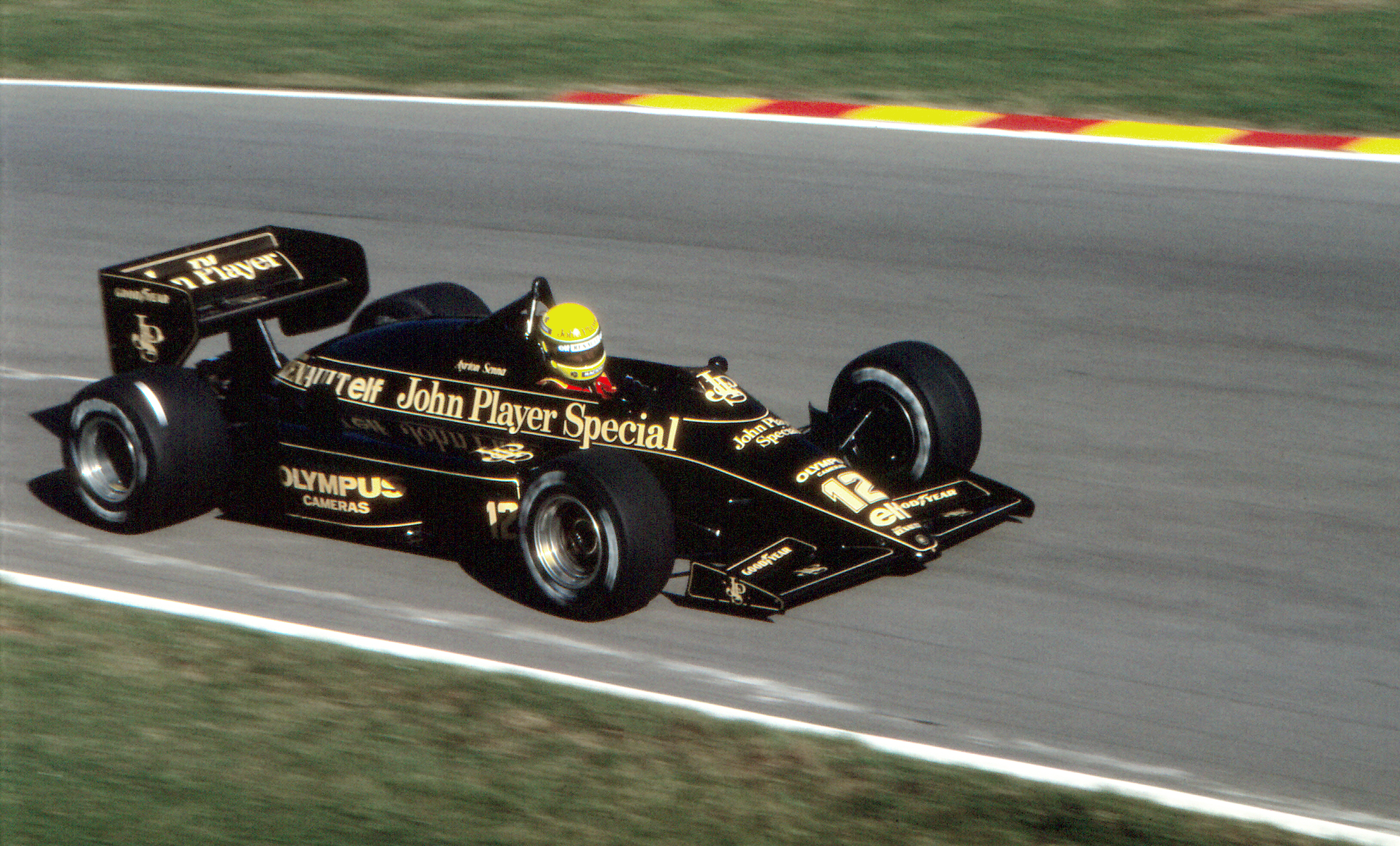
Ayrton Senna finished second for Lotus having started from pole position.

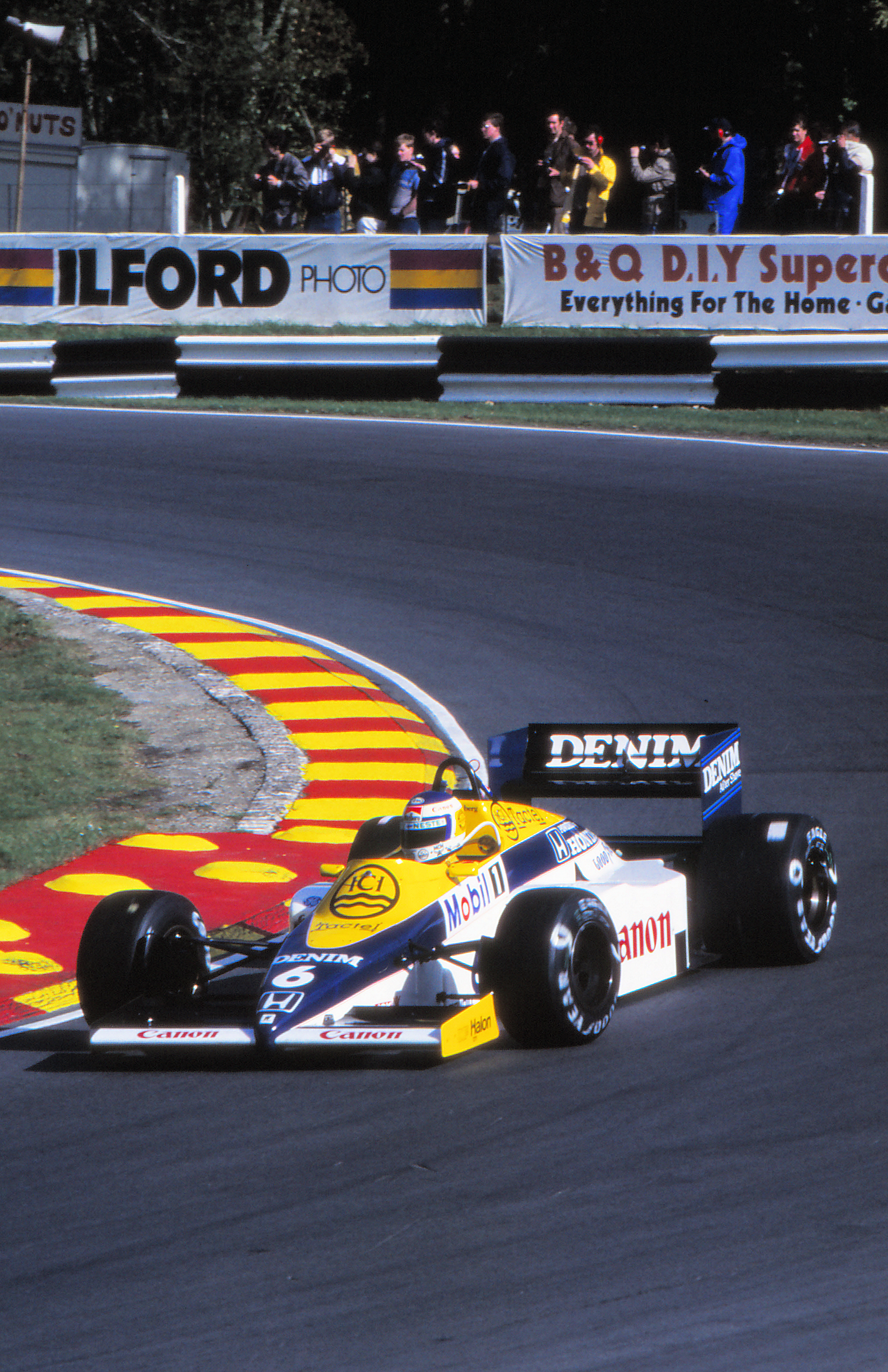
Mansell's teammate Keke Rosberg completed the podium.

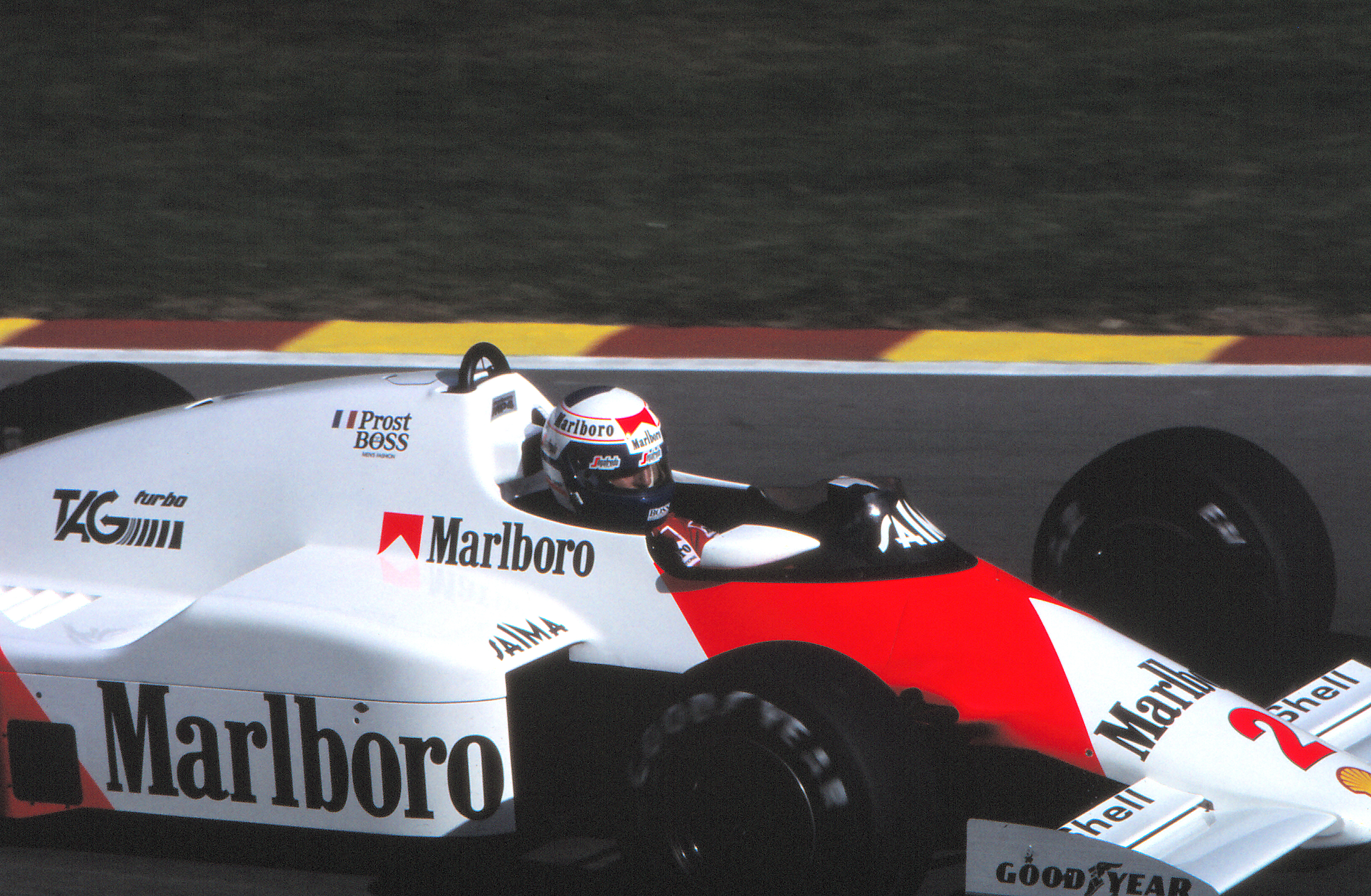
Alain Prost fought his way to a fourth-place finish, thus securing his first Drivers' Championship.

The 1985 European Grand Prix (formally the Shell Oils Grand Prix of Europe) was a Formula One motor race held at Brands Hatch on 6 October 1985. It was the fourteenth race of the 1985 Formula One World Championship.

The 75-lap race was won by Nigel Mansell, driving a Williams-Honda. It was Mansell's first Formula One victory in his 72nd race start. Ayrton Senna finished second in a Lotus-Renault, having started from pole position, while Mansell's teammate Keke Rosberg finished third. Alain Prost finished fourth in his McLaren-TAG which, combined with Michele Alboreto's retirement with a turbo failure, secured the Frenchman his first Drivers' Championship. As of 2025, Prost remains the only French driver to win the championship. Mansell was the first and only driver to win the European Grand Prix on home soil until Michael Schumacher in 1995.

== Qualifying ==
=== Qualifying report ===
Ayrton Senna took his sixth pole position of the season in his Lotus-Renault, averaging 140.106 mph (225.479 km/h), the first time anyone had lapped the Brands Hatch circuit faster than 140 mph. Compatriot Nelson Piquet was second in his Brabham-BMW, 0.3 seconds behind, followed by the Williams-Hondas of Nigel Mansell and Keke Rosberg. Philippe Streiff was a surprise fifth in his Ligier, ahead of Alain Prost's McLaren; the top ten was completed by Marc Surer in the second Brabham, Derek Warwick in the Renault, Elio de Angelis in the second Lotus and Jacques Laffite in the second Ligier. Prost's Drivers' Championship rival, Michele Alboreto, could only manage 15th in his Ferrari.

Prost's teammate Niki Lauda was unfit to race due to the wrist injury he had suffered at the previous race in Belgium. His place was taken by former McLaren stalwart John Watson, in his first F1 race since the end of 1983; the Ulsterman qualified 21st, over five seconds behind Senna. Watson's participation marked the last time to date a Formula One driver raced with number 1 without having been World Champion the previous season. Tyrrell had re-expanded to two cars, with Martin Brundle joined by Italian newcomer Ivan Capelli, who qualified 24th.

=== Qualifying classification ===
Pos	No	Driver	Constructor	Q1	Q2	Gap
1	12	(Brazil) Ayrton Senna	Lotus-Renault	1:08.020	1:07.169	
2	7	(Brazil) Nelson Piquet	Brabham-BMW	1:09.204	1:07.482	+0.313
3	5	(United Kingdom) Nigel Mansell	Williams-Honda	1:10.537	1:08.059	+0.890
4	6	(Finland) Keke Rosberg	Williams-Honda	1:09.277	1:08.197	+1.028
5	25	(France) Philippe Streiff	Ligier-Renault	1:10.396	1:09.080	+1.911
6	2	(France) Alain Prost	McLaren-TAG	1:10.345	1:09.429	+2.260
7	8	(Switzerland) Marc Surer	Brabham-BMW	1:09.762	1:09.913	+2.593
8	16	(United Kingdom) Derek Warwick	Renault	1:11.014	1:09.904	+2.735
9	11	(Italy) Elio de Angelis	Lotus-Renault	1:11.530	1:10.014	+2.845
10	26	(France) Jacques Laffite	Ligier-Renault	1:11.312	1:10.081	+2.912
11	22	(Italy) Riccardo Patrese	Alfa Romeo	1:10.963	1:10.251	+3.082
12	18	(Belgium) Thierry Boutsen	Arrows-BMW	1:10.918	1:10.323	+3.154
13	28	(Sweden) Stefan Johansson	Ferrari	1:11.309	1:10.517	+3.348
14	20	(Italy) Piercarlo Ghinzani	Toleman-Hart	1:13.517	1:10.570	+3.401
15	27	(Italy) Michele Alboreto	Ferrari	1:10.877	1:10.659	+3.490
16	3	(United Kingdom) Martin Brundle	Tyrrell-Renault	1:11.296	1:10.731	+3.562
17	15	(France) Patrick Tambay	Renault	1:13.048	1:10.934	+3.765
18	23	(United States) Eddie Cheever	Alfa Romeo	1:12.766	1:11.500	+4.331
19	17	(Austria) Gerhard Berger	Arrows-BMW	1:11.608	1:11.638	+4.439
20	19	(Italy) Teo Fabi	Toleman-Hart	1:13.024	1:12.090	+4.921
21	1	(United Kingdom) John Watson	McLaren-TAG	1:12.496	1:12.516	+5.327
22	33	(Australia) Alan Jones	Lola-Hart	1:14.050	1:13.084	+5.915
23	9	(France) Philippe Alliot	RAM-Hart	1:14.355	1:13.537	+6.368
24	4	(Italy) Ivan Capelli	Tyrrell-Renault	1:16.879	1:13.721	+6.552
25	30	(West Germany) Christian Danner	Zakspeed	1:15.947	1:15.054	+7.885
26	29	(Italy) Pierluigi Martini	Minardi-Motori Moderni	1:16.642	1:15.127	+9.473
DNQ	24	(Netherlands) Huub Rothengatter	Osella-Alfa Romeo	1:16.994	1:18.022	+9.825

== Race ==
=== Race report ===
Senna led off the line from a fast-starting Mansell, while Prost slid onto the grass and fell to 14th. Mansell then ran wide at Druids, allowing Rosberg and Piquet past.

On lap 7, Rosberg attempted to overtake Senna, but the Brazilian blocked the move causing Rosberg to spin at Surtees Corner and was unavoidably hit by Piquet in third. The Brabham was out on the spot with a broken front suspension, while Rosberg limped back to the pits with a puncture, losing a full lap in the process. Mansell was now second again, followed by de Angelis, Stefan Johansson in the second Ferrari and Surer, with Prost up to seventh following a charge through the field. When Rosberg exited the pits, he rejoined in front of the leaders. An aggrieved Rosberg blocked Senna (who he felt was responsible for the earlier incident). Rosberg cleverly positioned his car which allowed teammate Mansell to catch up to the Lotus before getting past at Surtees. Rosberg then allowed Mansell through, and the Englishman then set about building a lead, while Rosberg continued to hold up Senna.

On lap 14 Alboreto, who had made a good start and had run as high as sixth, suffered a fiery turbo failure, effectively ending his Championship challenge. Prost, running sixth at this point, now only needed to finish fifth to secure the title. Surer had moved ahead of Johansson by this stage and was closing on de Angelis, while Laffite was also on a charge, passing Prost and Johansson in quick succession.

Surer overtook de Angelis on lap 21, followed soon after by Laffite. The two then closed up to Senna, Surer getting past on lap 35 and Laffite one lap later. At this point, Mansell's lead was 14 seconds, while Prost was still seventh.

On lap 51, having just been re-passed by Senna, Laffite pitted for new tyres, dropping to eighth and promoting Johansson to fourth. Shortly afterwards, Prost passed de Angelis for fifth as the two were lapping Watson; this became fourth when Johansson started to suffer an electrical problem. Laffite retired on lap 59 with an engine failure, followed one lap later by Johansson.

Surer was still running second when on lap 63, he suffered a turbo failure similar to Alboreto's. This left Mansell around 20 seconds clear of Senna, with Prost now third, de Angelis fourth and Rosberg back up to fifth. Rosberg soon passed de Angelis before Prost, taking no chances, allowed the Finn through into the final podium position.

Up front, Mansell cruised to his first Formula One victory, his final margin over Senna being 21.4 seconds. Rosberg finished 37 seconds behind Senna and eight ahead of Prost, who celebrated becoming France's first Formula One Drivers' Champion. De Angelis and the Arrows of Thierry Boutsen rounded out the top six, Boutsen holding off Watson for the final point in what would turn out to be the Ulsterman's last F1 race.

=== Race classification ===
Pos	No	Driver	Constructor	Tyre	Laps	Time/Retired	Grid	Points
1	5	(United Kingdom) Nigel Mansell	Williams-Honda	G	75	1:32:58.109	3	9
2	12	(Brazil) Ayrton Senna	Lotus-Renault	G	75	+ 21.396	1	6
3	6	(Finland) Keke Rosberg	Williams-Honda	G	75	+ 58.533	4	4
4	2	(France) Alain Prost	McLaren-TAG	G	75	+ 1:06.121	6	3
5	11	(Italy) Elio de Angelis	Lotus-Renault	G	74	+ 1 Lap	9	2
6	18	(Belgium) Thierry Boutsen	Arrows-BMW	G	73	+ 2 Laps	12	1
7	1	(United Kingdom) John Watson	McLaren-TAG	G	73	+ 2 Laps	21	
8	25	(France) Philippe Streiff	Ligier-Renault	P	73	+ 2 Laps	5	
9	22	(Italy) Riccardo Patrese	Alfa Romeo	G	73	+ 2 Laps	11	
10	17	(Austria) Gerhard Berger	Arrows-BMW	G	73	+ 2 Laps	19	
11	23	(United States) Eddie Cheever	Alfa Romeo	G	73	+ 2 Laps	18	
12	15	(France) Patrick Tambay	Renault	G	72	+ 3 Laps	17	
Ret	8	(Switzerland) Marc Surer	Brabham-BMW	P	62	Turbo	7	
Ret	28	(Sweden) Stefan Johansson	Ferrari	G	59	Electrical	13	
Ret	26	(France) Jacques Laffite	Ligier-Renault	P	58	Engine	10	
Ret	30	(West Germany) Christian Danner	Zakspeed	G	55	Engine	25	
Ret	4	(Italy) Ivan Capelli	Tyrrell-Renault	G	44	Accident	24	
Ret	3	(United Kingdom) Martin Brundle	Tyrrell-Renault	G	40	Water leak	16	
Ret	19	(Italy) Teo Fabi	Toleman-Hart	P	33	Engine	20	
Ret	9	(France) Philippe Alliot	RAM-Hart	P	31	Engine	23	
Ret	20	(Italy) Piercarlo Ghinzani	Toleman-Hart	P	16	Engine	14	
Ret	33	(Australia) Alan Jones	Lola-Hart	G	13	Radiator	22	
Ret	27	(Italy) Michele Alboreto	Ferrari	G	13	Turbo	15	
Ret	7	(Brazil) Nelson Piquet	Brabham-BMW	P	6	Collision	2	
Ret	16	(United Kingdom) Derek Warwick	Renault	G	4	Injection	8	
Ret	29	(Italy) Pierluigi Martini	Minardi-Motori Moderni	P	3	Accident	26	

== Championship standings after the race ==
Drivers' Championship standings

Pos	Driver	Points
1	(France) Alain Prost	72
2	(Italy) Michele Alboreto	53
3	(Brazil) Ayrton Senna	38
4	(Italy) Elio de Angelis	33
5	(Finland) Keke Rosberg	25

Constructors' Championship standings

Pos	Constructor	Points
1	(United Kingdom) McLaren-TAG	86
2	(Italy) Ferrari	77
3	(United Kingdom) Lotus-Renault	71
4	(United Kingdom) Williams-Honda	47
5	(United Kingdom) Brabham-BMW	26

- Note: Only the top five positions are included for both sets of standings.

Previous race: 1985 Belgian Grand Prix	FIA Formula One World Championship; 1985 season	Next race: 1985 South African Grand Prix
Previous race: 1984 European Grand Prix; Previous race at Brands Hatch: 1984 British Grand Prix	European Grand Prix	Next race: 1993 European Grand Prix; Next race at Brands Hatch: 1986 British Grand Prix
