= Minardi =

Italian racing team

- Full name: Minardi F1 Team
- Base: Faenza, Italy
- Founder(s): Giancarlo Minardi
- Noted staff: Gustav Brunner, Paul Stoddart
- Noted drivers: (Italy) Alessandro Nannini (Italy) Pierluigi Martini (Spain) Marc Gené (Italy) Luca Badoer (Brazil) Christian Fittipaldi (Italy) Michele Alboreto (Australia) Mark Webber (Netherlands) Jos Verstappen (Spain) Fernando Alonso (Malaysia) Alex Yoong (United Kingdom) Justin Wilson (Italy) Giancarlo Fisichella (Italy) Jarno Trulli (Italy) Paolo Barilla
- Next name: Scuderia Toro Rosso

Formula One World Championship career
- First entry: 1985 Brazilian Grand Prix
- Races entered: 346 entries (340 starts)
- Engines: Motori Moderni, Ford, Ferrari, Lamborghini, Hart, Fondmetal, European, Asiatech, Cosworth
- Constructors' Championships: 0 (best finish: 7th, 1991)
- Drivers' Championships: 0
- Race victories: 0 (best finish: 4th, 1991 San Marino Grand Prix, 1991 Portuguese Grand Prix and 1993 South African Grand Prix)
- Points: 38
- Pole positions: 0 (best grid position: 2nd, 1990 United States Grand Prix)
- Fastest laps: 0
- Final entry: 2005 Chinese Grand Prix

Minardi was an Italian automobile racing team and constructor founded in Faenza in 1979 by Giancarlo Minardi. It competed in the Formula One World Championship from 1985 until 2005 with little success, nevertheless acquiring a loyal following of fans. In 2001, to save the team from folding, Minardi sold it to Australian businessman Paul Stoddart, who ran the team for five years before selling it on to Red Bull GmbH in 2005 who renamed it Scuderia Toro Rosso. Initially called "M" (short for Minardi) then a number, from 2001, all of Minardi chassis were called "PS", the PS being the initials of team owner, Paul Stoddart.

During its time in F1, the team scored a total of 38 championship points; 16 of these were earned by the team's first driver, Pierluigi Martini. Martini also recorded the team's only front row start, qualifying 2nd at the 1990 United States Grand Prix, and he led a lap during the 1989 Portuguese Grand Prix, the only time a Minardi led a lap. The team never achieved a podium finish, only managing three 4th-place finishes: Martini twice in 1991 and Christian Fittipaldi in 1993.

In the 21 seasons, Minardi entered 37 drivers. Thirteen had Italian nationality (nine of whom raced during the time the team was owned by Giancarlo Minardi), the others came with 13 different nationalities (discounting Doornbos racing under a Monaco license in 2005). Martini holds the record for more starts with the team with 103 Grands Prix, followed by Gianni Morbidelli and Marc Gené with 33 starts.

Before Minardi's demise, the team was particularly well-liked within Formula One circles for its friendliness, accessibility, and lack of corporate culture. On the track, their cars were regarded by many as well-designed for their tiny budget, their low position recognised as a result of a lack of funds (and engine power) rather than a poor car. They also resisted employing pay-drivers more than most other financially constrained teams. Former Minardi drivers include double World Champion Fernando Alonso, Grand Prix winners Alessandro Nannini, Giancarlo Fisichella, Jarno Trulli and Mark Webber; CART IndyCar World Series double champion Alessandro Zanardi and race winners Justin Wilson and Christian Fittipaldi; and 24 Hours of Le Mans overall winners Michele Alboreto, Pierluigi Martini, and Marc Gené.

== History ==
Traditional Minardi logo

The Minardi family has a longstanding involvement in motorsport. Giancarlo Minardi's grandfather had a Fiat dealership in Faenza since 1927, while his father, Giovanni Minardi, competed in his own cars in the late 1940s. The first Minardi car ever was the GM75 built by Giovanni Minardi: it had a 6 cylinder engine designed by Oberdan Golfieri and built by Antonio Lotti. Rino Ferniani drove it at the Circuito del Garda, retiring when he was leading the race.

After his father's death, Giancarlo took over the racing part of the family business. He took the reins of the Scuderia del Passatore in the early 1970s. He decided to start competing with a Brabham BT28 chassis and an Alfa Romeo engine in Formula Italia rather than Formula 3, like it was decided before. In 1972, the team finished runner-up with Giancarlo Martini, but he won in the following season. In 1974, Lamberto Leoni lost the championship due to a controversial black flag. In 1975, the team was renamed "Scuderia Everest" for sponsorship reasons. The promising Elio De Angelis raced for the team in 1977 and 1978 while Clay Regazzoni raced in 1978 and 1979. Minardi ran with March chassis and BMW engines in Formula Two from 1975 to 1979.

In 1976, the team briefly ran a customer Formula One Ferrari 312T with Giancarlo Martini, uncle of Pierluigi Martini. Martini Sr. qualified 15th for the Race of Champions at Brands Hatch but failed to start the race after an accident during the warm-up lap. The team then competed at the BRDC International Trophy in Silverstone where Martini finished 10th. In 1979, Minardi received financial backing from well known Italian motor racing patron Piero Mancini and set up the Minardi racing team as a Formula Two constructor.

== Racing history ==
=== Formula Two (1980–1984) ===
The team first competed under the Minardi name in the 1980 European Formula Two championship. Rather than using a customer chassis, the team commissioned a BMW-powered design from Giacomo Caliri's FLY studios — previously responsible for the Fittipaldi Automotive team's F5A Formula One car. The first Minardi's driver was Miguel Ángel Guerra, who achieved 9th place in the standings with 10 points. In 1981, Caliri and Marmiroli designed the Minardi M281 driven by Michele Alboreto, Johnny Cecotto, Miguel Ángel Guerra, Roberto Farneti and Enzo Coloni: Alboreto won the Misano race and finished 8th with 13 points, Cecotto gained 3 points and moved to March in summer. A Ferrari Dino 206 engine was used in 1981, but the team changed to a BMW four-cylinder unit in 1982. The new design continued Minardi's naming logic and was called the Minardi M282. The drivers were Alessandro Nannini and Paolo Barilla. Barilla didn't score any points, Nannini got 10th place with 8 points. The 1983 season saw several drivers racing with the Minardi M283: Alessandro Nannini (11 points), Pierluigi Martini (6 points), Paolo Barilla (0 points), Enzo Coloni (1 race), Emilio De Villota (2 races), Oscar Larrauri (1 race) and Aldo Bertuzzi (1 race). The last season in Formula 2 was in 1984. Nannini (finished 10th with 9 points) was the first driver, the others were Roberto Del Castello (14th, 1 point), Pierre Chauvet (1 race) and Lamberto Leoni (3 races).

The team's most notable result remains the 1981 win at the Misano round by Michele Alboreto. Minardi left the lower division at the end of 1984, although in 1986 a modified version of their final Formula Two car, the M283, was entered without success in two rounds of the Formula 3000 championship which had replaced Formula Two in 1985.

=== Minardi Formula One (1985–1993) ===
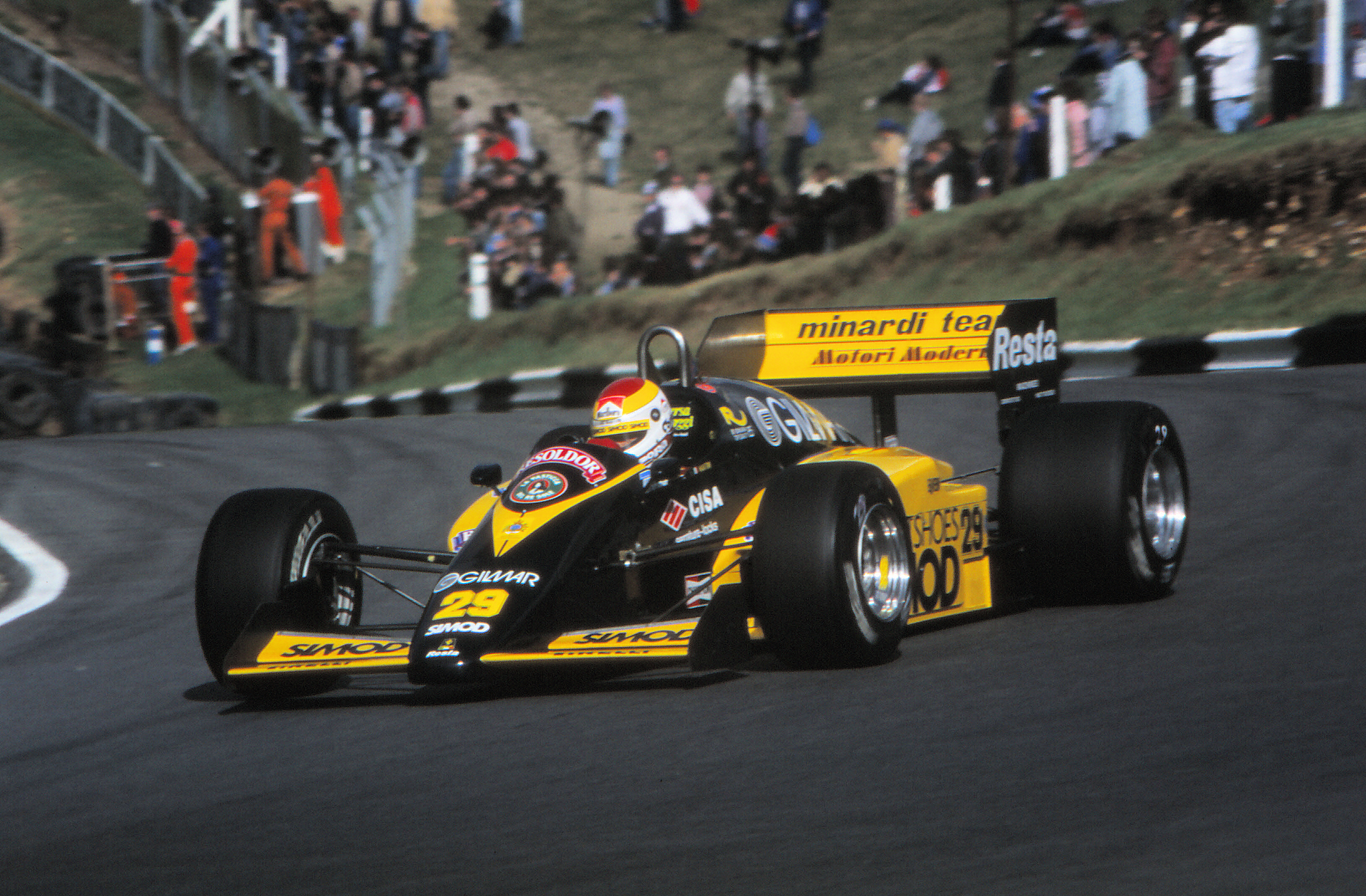
Pierluigi Martini during practice for the 1985 European Grand Prix

During 1984, Minardi took the decision to enter Formula One the following year. Caliri designed the M184, the team's prototype Formula One car (intended as a dual purpose design for the new Formula 3000) around Alfa Romeo's V8 turbocharged engine but when engineer Carlo Chiti left Alfa Romeo to found Motori Moderni, Minardi became the only customer for his new V6 engine design. The engine was not ready for the start of the 1985 season, so the team converted their M185 chassis to accept a Cosworth DFV engine for the first two races. The single car team was unsuccessful in its first year, scoring no points. The new engine was underpowered and driver Pierluigi Martini finished only two races, although he was also classified 11th at the German Grand Prix despite stopping with engine problems. Martini's best position was 8th in the 1985 Australian Grand Prix, behind Huub Rothengatter in an Osella.

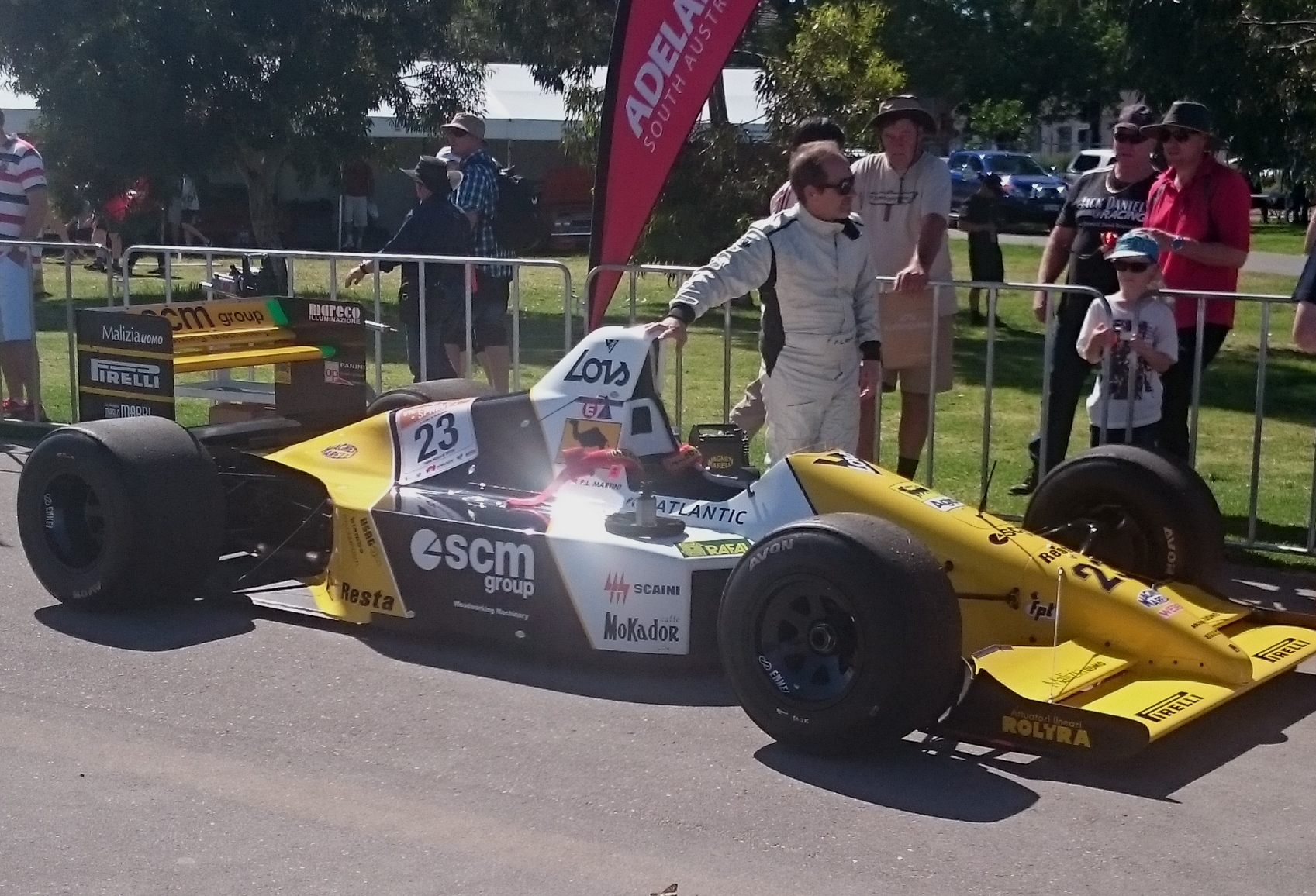
Pierluigi Martini and the Minardi M189 at the 2016 Adelaide Motorsport Festival

Nonetheless, the team expanded to two cars for the 1986 season. In 1988, Minardi switched to Cosworth engines, and in 1989 it became top entrant for Pirelli's return to Formula One. The team was moderately successful in the midfield through the late 1980s and early 1990s, giving a succession of Italian drivers their first chance at the top level, including Alessandro Nannini, Pierluigi Martini and Gianni Morbidelli (Nannini, who had been the team's Formula 2 driver from 1982–1984, had actually been the team's first choice as their F1 driver in 1985, but they had to go with Martini after FISA refused to grant Nannini the Super Licence required to drive in F1. They would grant Nannini the licence in 1986). Martini in particular was synonymous with Minardi, eventually having three spells with the team. He drove for them on their debut in 1985, scored their first point in the 1988 United States Grand Prix, although he had been running 5th for quite a long time during the race until being passed by Tyrrell's Jonathan Palmer, took their only front-row start at 1990 USA Grand Prix (aided by special Pirelli tyres; several of their other drivers had surprise qualifying results that day. Also, day 2 of qualifying was rained out so no one improved), their only lap leading a race in the 1989 Portuguese Grand Prix, where he finished 5th, and scored their joint-best F1 result up to that point (the other being at the British Grand Prix the same year). In 1991, Minardi became the first team in modern times to make use of customer engines from Ferrari and in 1992 they used Lamborghini V12s. In 1993, Minardi enjoyed a good campaign, collecting seven points thanks to Christian Fittipaldi's fourth place in the 1993 South African Grand Prix and fifth place in the 1993 Monaco Grand Prix and Fabrizio Barbazza sixth places in the 1993 European Grand Prix and 1993 San Marino Grand Prix.

=== Minardi, Scuderia Italia and Fondmetal (1994–2000) ===
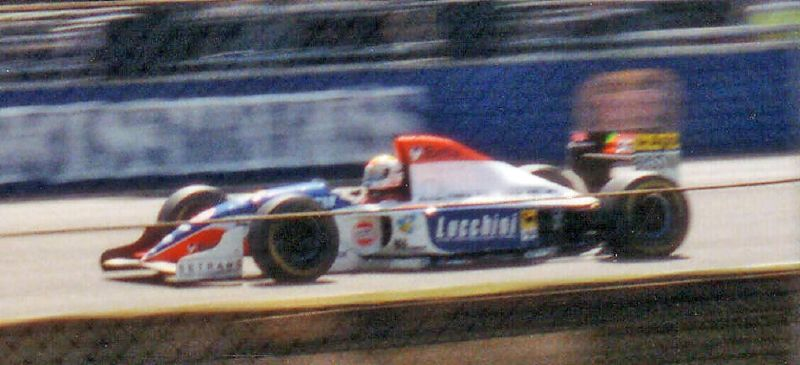
Pierluigi Martini driving for Minardi at the 1994 British Grand Prix

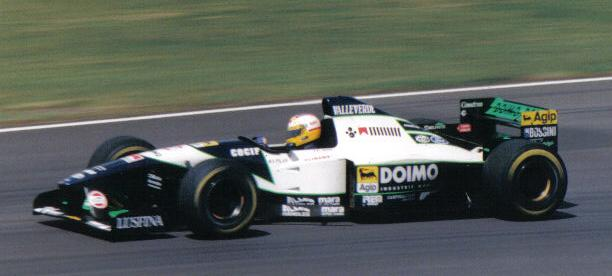
Luca Badoer driving for Minardi at the 1995 British Grand Prix

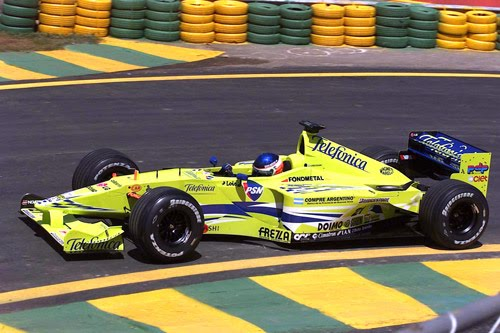
Gastón Mazzacane with the Minardi M02

As the number of small teams shrank, Minardi slipped from the mid-field towards the back of the grid. Money woes hit and in 1994 Minardi merged with BMS Scuderia Italia in an effort to survive. Giancarlo Minardi retained 14.5% with the remaining 85.5% distributed between the Scuderia Italia investors (Emilio Gnutti, Giuseppe Lucchini and Vittorio Palazzani) and Defendente Marniga. In 1994, Martini finished 5th at both the 1994 Spanish Grand Prix and 1994 French Grand Prix, while Michele Alboreto scored his last point in Formula 1 with a 6th place in the 1994 Monaco Grand Prix. Acknowledging that the team was struggling, Bernie Ecclestone spoke to Flavio Briatore, who agreed to buy a share in the team in 1995. In 1996, Italian businessman Gabriele Rumi, former owner of the Fondmetal team switched his sponsorship support from Tyrrell to Minardi. He gradually increased his interest in the Faenza outfit, becoming co-owner and chairman. In 1997, Minardi teamed up with engine manufacturer Brian Hart. For the 2000 season the team were forced to use 1998-spec Ford Zetec-R V10 engines, which were rebadged as Fondmetal engines in deference to his financial input. However, Rumi's poor health forced him to withdraw his backing at the end of the season.

Points were rare during this time; Pedro Lamy scored his one and only point in Formula 1 with a 6th place in the 1995 Australian Grand Prix; this result was followed by a long barren spell until Marc Gené finished 6th in the 1999 European Grand Prix. That same race, Luca Badoer had been running fourth until his gearbox failed with 13 laps to go, at which point the Italian burst into tears next to his stricken car. Other Minardi drivers also came close to scoring points, including Shinji Nakano who finished 7th at the 1998 Canadian Grand Prix and Esteban Tuero, who finished 8th at the 1998 San Marino Grand Prix.

Minardi was known for not using pay drivers, but for the 2000 season, the team signed Argentinian Gastón Mazzacane, who only acquired the seat thanks to backing from the short-lived pay television channel Pan-American Sports Network.

=== European Minardi (2001–2005) ===
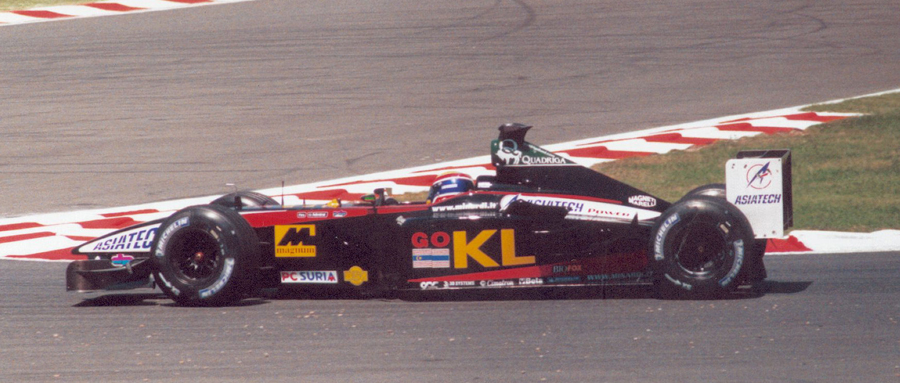
Mark Webber driving the Minardi PS02 at the 2002 French Grand Prix

The team, now near collapse, was purchased by Australian businessman Paul Stoddart in early 2001, merging it with his European Racing Formula 3000 team. That season saw Fernando Alonso make his F1 debut for the team at the age of 19; though he (and the team) failed to score any points that year, his performance was impressive enough that the reborn Renault F1 team signed him for 2002. He was replaced by Mark Webber, another future race winner, and heavy attrition at his debut race in Melbourne saw him finish in the points in 5th, with teammate Alex Yoong just outside the points in 7th. During the season the team used Asiatech branded engines (formerly Peugeot), the rest of the season did not yield any further points for the team. The team finished above the newly debuted Toyota factory team who arguably had a much more sizable budget for the debut campaign than Minardi's budgets over several seasons combined. Minardi also finished ahead of the Arrows team who went bankrupt halfway through the season due to mounting debts and several mounting court cases against them.

From 2003 until their final season in 2005, Minardi used Ford Cosworth/Cosworth branded engines due to Asiatech folding at the end of the previous season. The Cosworth engines though not very reliable did help Minardi to some decent points scoring positions now and again.

Another memorable episode happened during the 2003 Brazilian Grand Prix. The race was stopped just after 75% distance, after treacherous weather and a sequence of accidents, including a spin into the grass for lead Minardi driver Jos Verstappen. Stoddart later claimed that Verstappen had enough fuel on board to last until just after the time the red flag was eventually waved, due to the large number of safety car laps. Assuming Stoddart was being truthful, Verstappen may well have won this race had he not spun.

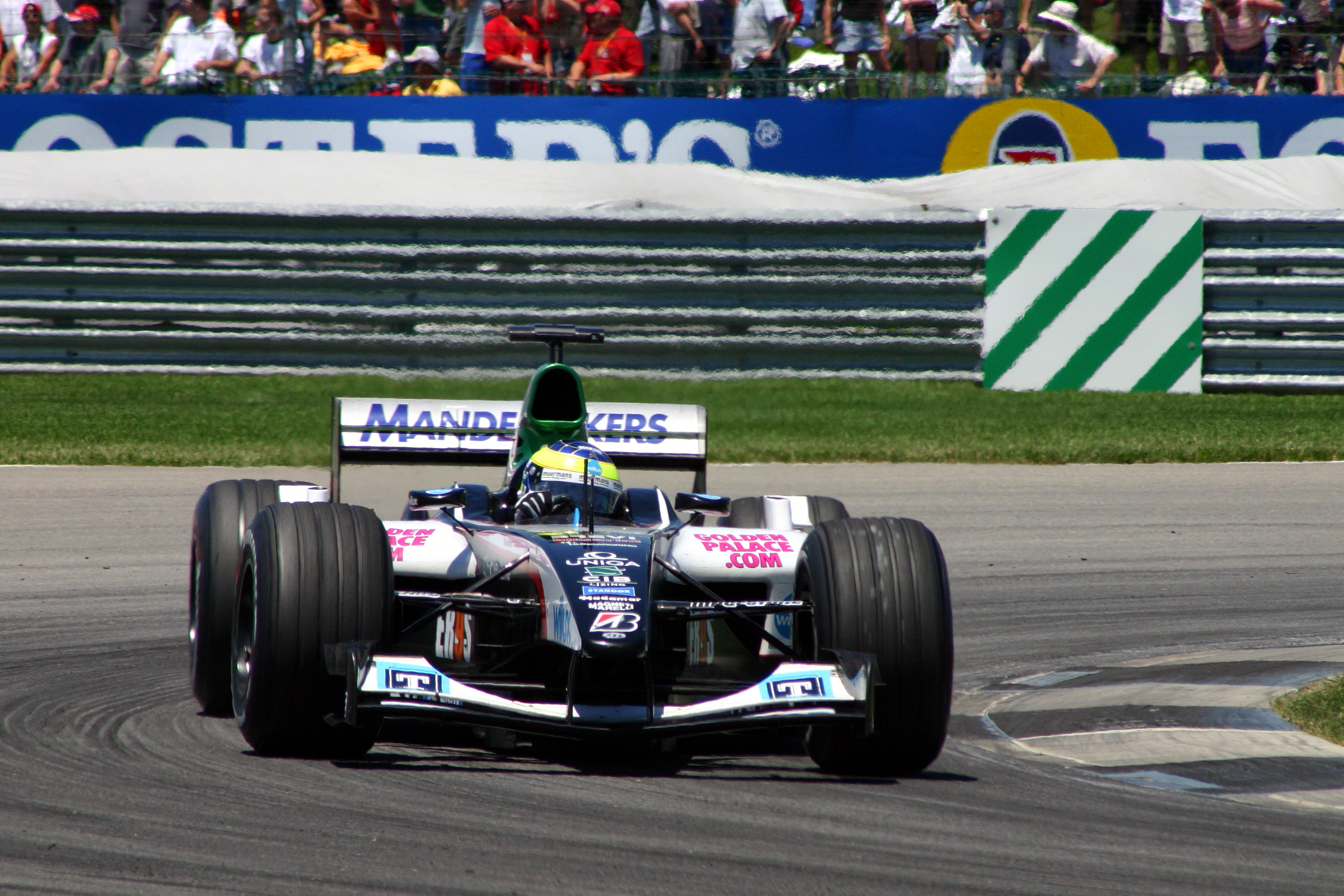
Zsolt Baumgartner driving at the 2004 United States GP

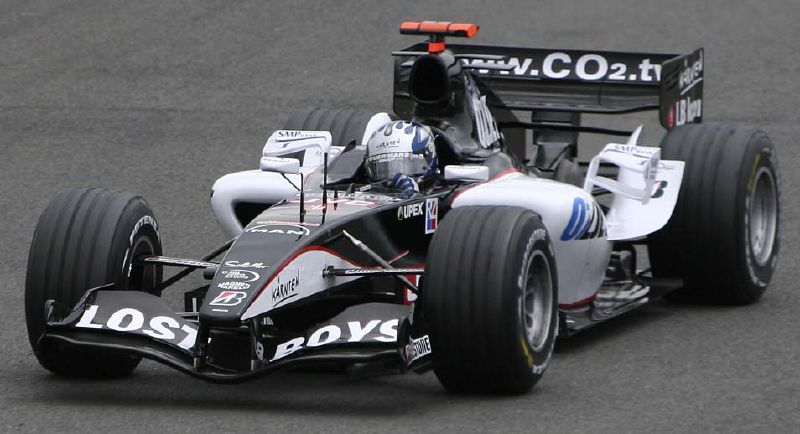
Patrick Friesacher driving the Minardi PS05, the last Minardi chassis to be produced, at Silverstone

During its final years, the Minardi team was almost as famous for its politics as for its racing. Stoddart was described as the Formula One teams' unofficial shop steward. During his time as team principal, Stoddart campaigned for reduced costs in the sport. He appealed to the competing car manufacturers for an agreement where the independent (and, on the whole, financially weaker) teams in Formula One would get cheaper engine deals than at present. In return, the team principals who would benefit from this would support the works teams when it came to opposing new rule changes enforced by the FIA, such as the proposed ban on traction control. Before the start of the 2004 season, however, Stoddart threatened to withdraw his support against the ban on traction control, but later changed his mind. Midway through the 2004 season, the other teams voted to change the unpopular single lap qualifying system back to the old 1 hour format, but Stoddart voted against because it would also mean the 107% rule being reintroduced; this meant the change never occurred, as a unanimous vote was required to change something so significant in the middle of a season. Before the 2005 Australian Grand Prix, Stoddart initially threatened to withdraw his cars if they were made to comply with the revised regulations for 2005, claiming Minardi could not afford to do so. Once again Stoddart ended up withdrawing his threat. Stoddart also repeatedly called for the resignation of the FIA's President, Max Mosley, particularly in the aftermath of the 2005 United States Grand Prix where the majority of teams withdrew from the race due to safety concerns about their Michelin tyres. While Minardi had run Bridgestone tyres, Stoddart had offered to compromise with the Michelin teams but Mosley had rejected it.

In 2004, Minardi was represented by two rookies, Italian Gianmaria "Gimmi" Bruni and Hungarian Zsolt Baumgartner. During the year, they celebrated their 20th season in F1. Baumgartner scored Minardi's first point in more than 2 years at the United States Grand Prix, finishing 8th. Baumgartner was also the first Hungarian to score a point in a World Championship F1 race.

In 2005, Minardi's drivers were Christijan Albers and Patrick Friesacher. They amassed a total of seven points following the debacle of the 2005 United States Grand Prix, in which they finished fifth and sixth (of six runners) respectively. After losing financial backing from his sponsors before the 2005 German Grand Prix, Friesacher was replaced by Dutch Jordan test driver Robert Doornbos, creating the first all-Dutch driver line-up in Formula One since Carel Godin de Beaufort and Ben Pon drove together for the Ecurie Maarsbergen team at the 1962 Dutch Grand Prix at Zandvoort.

== Red Bull purchase ==
In 2005, Paul Stoddart stated that he would sell Minardi if he could find the right buyer. Stoddart claimed that he had 41 approaches. His criterion for a sale was the ability of a buyer to move the team forward and leave the team based in Faenza. The drinks manufacturer Red Bull GmbH, which already owned another Formula One team, Red Bull Racing, decided to set up a second team to promote drivers who had risen through its young driver programme, Red Bull Driver Search by integrating all Minardi F1 Academy members and resources.

Ending several weeks of speculation on 10 September 2005 Red Bull announced it would take control of Minardi in November and run it as their "rookie team" from 2006.

Minardi fans worldwide immediately started an online petition to save the Minardi team name and the team's 20-year heritage in F1 after the news broke. The petition was not successful and the team was renamed Scuderia Toro Rosso for the 2006 season. The greatly increased funding from Red Bull, including the use of the Red Bull chassis, customer Ferrari engines and Red Bull Technology transmissions, gradually led to improved results, culminating in Toro Rosso's only pole position and win by Sebastian Vettel at the 2008 Italian Grand Prix. The team was further renamed Scuderia AlphaTauri in 2020 to promote the clothing brand of Red Bull. The team won as AlphaTauri at Monza in 2020, with Pierre Gasly. The team was further renamed again as Visa Cash App RB in 2024.

== Racing return for Minardi ==
Giancarlo Minardi and Paul Stoddart have both made use of the Minardi name in new motorsport ventures.

On 1 January 2006, Giancarlo Minardi re-acquired certain rights to use the Minardi name in racing. He also announced that he was licensing the Minardi name to established team GP Racing in the junior Euro Formula 3000 series, to be entitled 'Minardi Team by GP Racing'. The team raced with moderate success, scoring a podium in each leg of the Spa round in June 2006. For 2007, Minardi Team by GP Racing combined forces with GP2 team Piquet Sports, to form Minardi Piquet Sports. For 2008 the team was known simply as Piquet Sports.

In 2006, Paul Stoddart declared his intention to enter a new team called 'European Minardi F1 Team Ltd' into Formula One beginning in 2008. His application was unsuccessful, with the 12th place on the grid being awarded to Prodrive. Instead, Stoddart turned his attentions to the U.S.-based Champ Car series. On 18 December 2006, it was confirmed that he had purchased a controlling interest in the CTE Racing-HVM Champ Car team and that the team would be renamed Minardi Team USA. In 2007, the team had reasonable success. Robert Doornbos took two wins and several podium places on his way to third in the series, winning Rookie of the Year honours. When the series folded before its planned 2008 season, Stoddart's involvement ceased, with the team entering the IndyCar Series under the HVM name.

Stoddart retains the right to use the Minardi name for a British-registered company.

== Heads of Minardi F1 ==
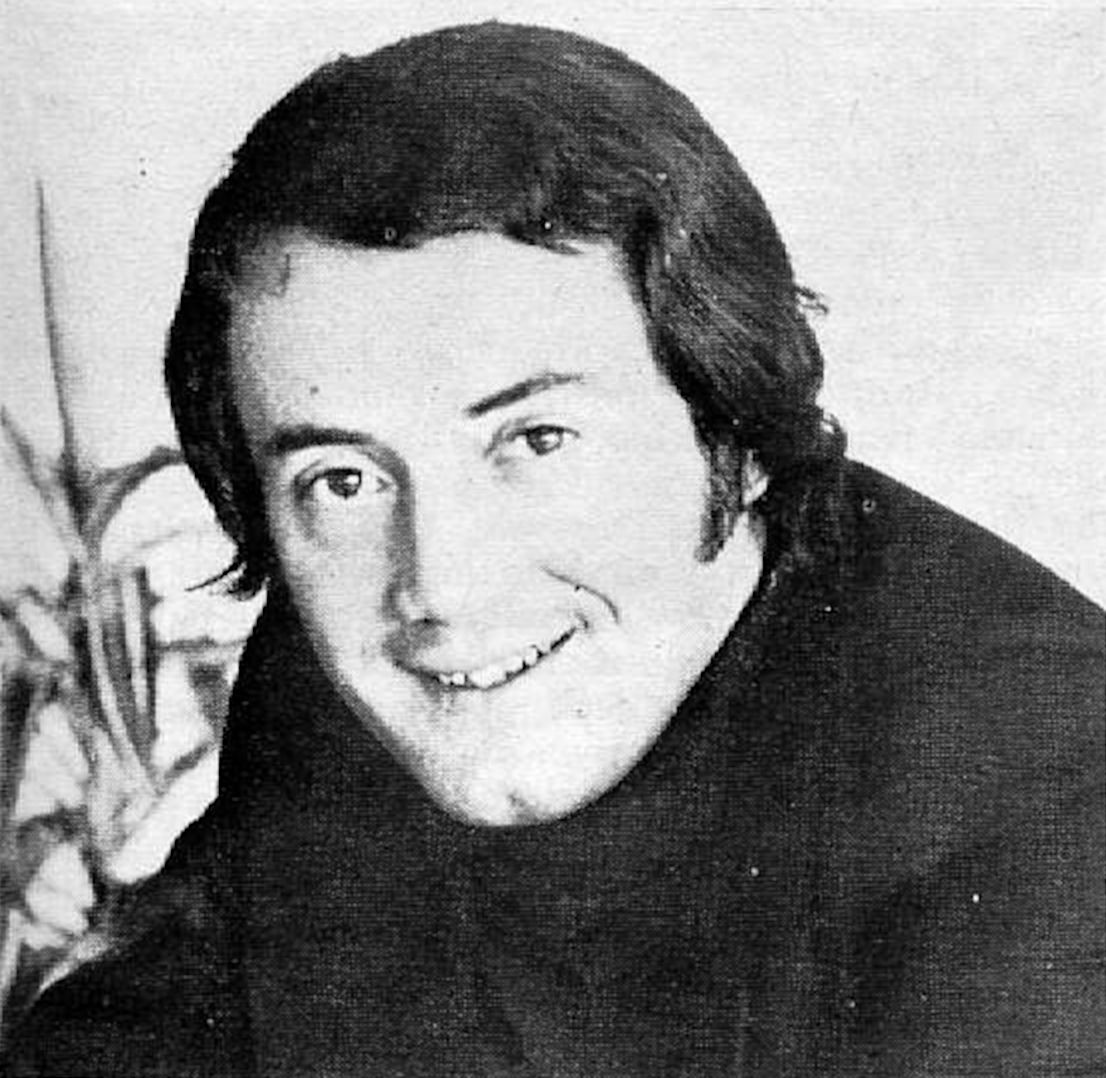
Giancarlo Minardi in 1974

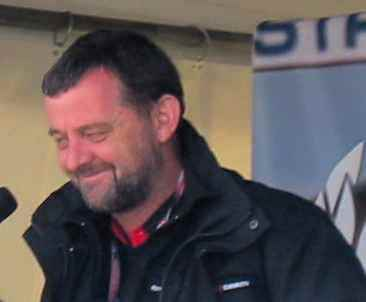
Paul Stoddart at the 2005 Australian Grand Prix

- Owners
  - 1985–1995 Giancarlo Minardi
  - 1996–1997 Giancarlo Minardi and Flavio Briatore
  - 1997–2000 Giancarlo Minardi and Gabriele Rumi
  - 2001–2005 Paul Stoddart
- Technical Directors
  - 1985–1988 Giacomo Caliri
  - 1989–1995 Aldo Costa
  - 1996–1998 Gabriele Tredozi
  - 1999–2000 Gustav Brunner
  - 2001–2005 Gabriele Tredozi
- Sporting Director
  - 1988-1990 Jaime Manca Graziadei
  - 1998–2000 Cesare Fiorio
  - 2001–2004 John Walton
- Commercial / Marketing Directors
  - 1998–2000 Massimo Rivola
  - 2001–2002 Rupert Manwaring
  - 2003–2005 Paul Jordan

== Complete Formula One results ==
(key)

Year	Chassis	Engine	Tyres	Drivers	1	2	3	4	5	6	7	8	9	10	11	12	13	14	15	16	17	18	19	Points	WCC
1985	M185	Ford DFY 3.0 V8	P		BRA	POR	SMR	MON	CAN	DET	FRA	GBR	GER	AUT	NED	ITA	BEL	EUR	RSA	AUS				0	NC
1985	M185	Ford DFY 3.0 V8	P	(Italy) Pierluigi Martini	Ret	Ret																		0	NC
1985	M185	Motori Moderni 615-90 1.5 V6 t	P	(Italy) Pierluigi Martini			Ret	DNQ	Ret	Ret	Ret	Ret	11^{†}	Ret	Ret	Ret	12	Ret	Ret	8				0	NC
1986	M185B; M186	Motori Moderni 615-90 1.5 V6 t	P		BRA	ESP	SMR	MON	BEL	CAN	DET	FRA	GBR	GER	HUN	AUT	ITA	POR	MEX	AUS				0	NC
1986	M185B; M186	Motori Moderni 615-90 1.5 V6 t	P	(Italy) Andrea de Cesaris	Ret	Ret	Ret	DNQ	Ret	Ret	Ret	Ret	Ret	Ret	Ret	Ret	Ret	Ret	8	Ret				0	NC
1986	M185B; M186	Motori Moderni 615-90 1.5 V6 t	P	(Italy) Alessandro Nannini	Ret	DNS	Ret	DNQ	Ret	Ret	Ret	Ret	Ret	Ret	Ret	Ret	Ret	Ret	14	Ret				0	NC
1987	M187	Motori Moderni 615-90 1.5 V6 t	G		BRA	SMR	BEL	MON	DET	FRA	GBR	GER	HUN	AUT	ITA	POR	ESP	MEX	JPN	AUS				0	NC
1987	M187	Motori Moderni 615-90 1.5 V6 t	G	(Spain) Adrián Campos	DSQ	Ret	Ret	DNS	Ret	Ret	Ret	Ret	Ret	Ret	Ret	Ret	14	Ret	Ret	Ret				0	NC
1987	M187	Motori Moderni 615-90 1.5 V6 t	G	(Italy) Alessandro Nannini	Ret	Ret	Ret	Ret	Ret	Ret	Ret	Ret	11	Ret	16	11^{†}	Ret	Ret	Ret	Ret				0	NC
1988	M188	Ford DFZ 3.5 V8	G		BRA	SMR	MON	MEX	CAN	DET	FRA	GBR	GER	HUN	BEL	ITA	POR	ESP	JPN	AUS				1	10th
1988	M188	Ford DFZ 3.5 V8	G	(Spain) Adrián Campos	Ret	16	DNQ	DNQ	DNQ															1	10th
1988	M188	Ford DFZ 3.5 V8	G	(Italy) Pierluigi Martini						6	15	15	DNQ	Ret	DNQ	Ret	Ret	Ret	13	7				1	10th
1988	M188	Ford DFZ 3.5 V8	G	(Spain) Luis Pérez-Sala	Ret	11	Ret	11	13	Ret	NC	Ret	DNQ	10	DNQ	Ret	8	12	15	Ret				1	10th
1989	M188B; M189	Ford DFR 3.5 V8	P		BRA	SMR	MON	MEX	USA	CAN	FRA	GBR	GER	HUN	BEL	ITA	POR	ESP	JPN	AUS				6	11th
1989	M188B; M189	Ford DFR 3.5 V8	P	(Italy) Pierluigi Martini	Ret	Ret	Ret	Ret	Ret	Ret	Ret	5	9	Ret	9	7	5	Ret		6				6	11th
1989	M188B; M189	Ford DFR 3.5 V8	P	(Italy) Paolo Barilla															Ret					6	11th
1989	M188B; M189	Ford DFR 3.5 V8	P	(Spain) Luis Pérez-Sala	Ret	Ret	Ret	DNQ	Ret	Ret	DNQ	6	DNQ	Ret	15	8	12	Ret	Ret	DNQ				6	11th
1990	M189B; M190	Ford DFR 3.5 V8	P		USA	BRA	SMR	MON	CAN	MEX	FRA	GBR	GER	HUN	BEL	ITA	POR	ESP	JPN	AUS				0	NC
1990	M189B; M190	Ford DFR 3.5 V8	P	(Italy) Pierluigi Martini	7	9	DNS	Ret	Ret	12	Ret	Ret	Ret	Ret	15	Ret	11	Ret	8	9				0	NC
1990	M189B; M190	Ford DFR 3.5 V8	P	(Italy) Paolo Barilla	Ret	Ret	11	Ret	DNQ	14	DNQ	12	Ret	15	Ret	DNQ	DNQ	DNQ						0	NC
1990	M189B; M190	Ford DFR 3.5 V8	P	(Italy) Gianni Morbidelli															Ret	Ret				0	NC
1991	M191	Ferrari 037 3.5 V12	G		USA	BRA	SMR	MON	CAN	MEX	FRA	GBR	GER	HUN	BEL	ITA	POR	ESP	JPN	AUS				6	7th
1991	M191	Ferrari 037 3.5 V12	G	(Italy) Pierluigi Martini	9	Ret	4	12	7	Ret	9	9	Ret	Ret	12^{†}	Ret	4	13	Ret	Ret				6	7th
1991	M191	Ferrari 037 3.5 V12	G	(Italy) Gianni Morbidelli	Ret	8	Ret	Ret	Ret	7	Ret	11	Ret	13	Ret	9	9	14^{†}	Ret					6	7th
1991	M191	Ferrari 037 3.5 V12	G	(Brazil) Roberto Moreno																16				6	7th
1992	M191B; M191L; M192	Lamborghini 3512 3.5 V12	G		RSA	MEX	BRA	ESP	SMR	MON	CAN	FRA	GBR	GER	HUN	BEL	ITA	POR	JPN	AUS				1	12th
1992	M191B; M191L; M192	Lamborghini 3512 3.5 V12	G	(Brazil) Christian Fittipaldi	Ret	Ret	Ret	11	Ret	8	13	DNQ				DNQ	DNQ	12	6	9				1	12th
1992	M191B; M191L; M192	Lamborghini 3512 3.5 V12	G	(Italy) Alessandro Zanardi									DNQ	Ret	DNQ									1	12th
1992	M191B; M191L; M192	Lamborghini 3512 3.5 V12	G	(Italy) Gianni Morbidelli	Ret	Ret	7	Ret	Ret	Ret	11	8	17^{†}	12	DNQ	16	Ret	14	14	10				1	12th
1993	M193	Ford HBC6 3.5 V8	G		RSA	BRA	EUR	SMR	ESP	MON	CAN	FRA	GBR	GER	HUN	BEL	ITA	POR	JPN	AUS				7	8th
1993	M193	Ford HBC6 3.5 V8	G	(Brazil) Christian Fittipaldi	4	Ret	7	Ret	8	5	9	8	12^{†}	11	Ret	Ret	8	9						7	8th
1993	M193	Ford HBC6 3.5 V8	G	(France) Jean-Marc Gounon															Ret	Ret				7	8th
1993	M193	Ford HBC6 3.5 V8	G	(Italy) Fabrizio Barbazza	Ret	Ret	6	6	Ret	11	Ret	Ret												7	8th
1993	M193	Ford HBC6 3.5 V8	G	(Italy) Pierluigi Martini									Ret	14	Ret	Ret	7	8	10	Ret				7	8th
1994	M193B; M194	Ford HBC7/8 3.5 V8	G		BRA	PAC	SMR	MON	ESP	CAN	FRA	GBR	GER	HUN	BEL	ITA	POR	EUR	JPN	AUS				5	10th
1994	M193B; M194	Ford HBC7/8 3.5 V8	G	(Italy) Pierluigi Martini	8	Ret	Ret	Ret	5	9	5	10	Ret	Ret	8	Ret	12	15	Ret	9				5	10th
1994	M193B; M194	Ford HBC7/8 3.5 V8	G	(Italy) Michele Alboreto	Ret	Ret	Ret	6	Ret	11	Ret	Ret	Ret	7	9	Ret	13	14	Ret	Ret				5	10th
1995	M195	Ford EDM 3.0 V8	G		BRA	ARG	SMR	ESP	MON	CAN	FRA	GBR	GER	HUN	BEL	ITA	POR	EUR	PAC	JPN	AUS			1	10th
1995	M195	Ford EDM 3.0 V8	G	(Italy) Pierluigi Martini	DNS	Ret	12	14	7	Ret	Ret	7	Ret											1	10th
1995	M195	Ford EDM 3.0 V8	G	(Portugal) Pedro Lamy										9	10	Ret	Ret	9	13	11	6			1	10th
1995	M195	Ford EDM 3.0 V8	G	(Italy) Luca Badoer	Ret	DNS	14	Ret	Ret	8	13	10	Ret	8	Ret	Ret	14	11	15	9	Ret			1	10th
1996	M195B	Ford ED2 3.0 V8; Ford ED3 3.0 V8	G		AUS	BRA	ARG	EUR	SMR	MON	ESP	CAN	FRA	GBR	GER	HUN	BEL	ITA	POR	JPN				0	NC
1996	M195B	Ford ED2 3.0 V8; Ford ED3 3.0 V8	G	(Portugal) Pedro Lamy	Ret	10	Ret	12	9	Ret	Ret	Ret	12	Ret	12	Ret	10	Ret	16	12				0	NC
1996	M195B	Ford ED2 3.0 V8; Ford ED3 3.0 V8	G	(Italy) Giancarlo Fisichella	Ret			13	Ret	Ret	Ret	8	Ret	11										0	NC
1996	M195B	Ford ED2 3.0 V8; Ford ED3 3.0 V8	G	(Brazil) Tarso Marques		Ret	Ret																	0	NC
1996	M195B	Ford ED2 3.0 V8; Ford ED3 3.0 V8	G	(Italy) Giovanni Lavaggi											DNQ	10^{†}	DNQ	Ret	15	DNQ				0	NC
1997	M197	Hart 830 AV7 3.0 V8	B		AUS	BRA	ARG	SMR	MON	ESP	CAN	FRA	GBR	GER	HUN	BEL	ITA	AUT	LUX	JPN	EUR			0	NC
1997	M197	Hart 830 AV7 3.0 V8	B	(Japan) Ukyo Katayama	Ret	18	Ret	11	10	Ret	Ret	11	Ret	Ret	10	14	Ret	11	Ret	Ret	17			0	NC
1997	M197	Hart 830 AV7 3.0 V8	B	(Italy) Jarno Trulli	9	12	9	DNS	Ret	15	Ret													0	NC
1997	M197	Hart 830 AV7 3.0 V8	B	(Brazil) Tarso Marques								Ret	10	Ret	12	Ret	14	EX	Ret	Ret	15			0	NC
1998	M198	Ford JD Zetec-R 3.0 V10	B		AUS	BRA	ARG	SMR	ESP	MON	CAN	FRA	GBR	AUT	GER	HUN	BEL	ITA	LUX	JPN				0	NC
1998	M198	Ford JD Zetec-R 3.0 V10	B	(Japan) Shinji Nakano	Ret	Ret	13	Ret	14	9	7	17^{†}	8	11	Ret	15	8	Ret	15	Ret				0	NC
1998	M198	Ford JD Zetec-R 3.0 V10	B	(Argentina) Esteban Tuero	Ret	Ret	Ret	8	15	Ret	Ret	Ret	Ret	Ret	16	Ret	Ret	11	Ret	Ret				0	NC
1999	M01	Ford VJM1 Zetec-R 3.0 V10; Ford VJM2 Zetec-R 3.0 V10	B		AUS	BRA	SMR	MON	ESP	CAN	FRA	GBR	AUT	GER	HUN	BEL	ITA	EUR	MAL	JPN				1	10th
1999	M01	Ford VJM1 Zetec-R 3.0 V10; Ford VJM2 Zetec-R 3.0 V10	B	(Italy) Luca Badoer	Ret		8	Ret	Ret	10	10	Ret	13	10	14	Ret	Ret	Ret	Ret	Ret				1	10th
1999	M01	Ford VJM1 Zetec-R 3.0 V10; Ford VJM2 Zetec-R 3.0 V10	B	(France) Stéphane Sarrazin		Ret																		1	10th
1999	M01	Ford VJM1 Zetec-R 3.0 V10; Ford VJM2 Zetec-R 3.0 V10	B	(Spain) Marc Gené	Ret	9	9	Ret	Ret	8	Ret	15	11	9	17	16	Ret	6	9	Ret				1	10th
2000	M02	Ford Cosworth Zetec-R (badged as Fondmetal) 3.0 V10	B		AUS	BRA	SMR	GBR	ESP	EUR	MON	CAN	FRA	AUT	GER	HUN	BEL	ITA	USA	JPN	MAL			0	NC
2000	M02	Ford Cosworth Zetec-R (badged as Fondmetal) 3.0 V10	B	(Spain) Marc Gené	8	Ret	Ret	14	14	Ret	Ret	16^{†}	15	8	Ret	15	14	9	12	Ret	Ret			0	NC
2000	M02	Ford Cosworth Zetec-R (badged as Fondmetal) 3.0 V10	B	(Argentina) Gastón Mazzacane	Ret	10	13	15	15	8	Ret	12	Ret	12	11	Ret	17	10	Ret	15	13^{†}			0	NC
2001	PS01; PS01B	Ford Zetec-R (badged as European) 3.0 V10	M		AUS	MAL	BRA	SMR	ESP	AUT	MON	CAN	EUR	FRA	GBR	GER	HUN	BEL	ITA	USA	JPN			0	NC
2001	PS01; PS01B	Ford Zetec-R (badged as European) 3.0 V10	M	(Brazil) Tarso Marques	Ret	14	9	Ret	16	Ret	Ret	9	Ret	15	DNQ	Ret	Ret	13						0	NC
2001	PS01; PS01B	Ford Zetec-R (badged as European) 3.0 V10	M	(Malaysia) Alex Yoong															Ret	Ret	16			0	NC
2001	PS01; PS01B	Ford Zetec-R (badged as European) 3.0 V10	M	(Spain) Fernando Alonso	12	13	Ret	Ret	13	Ret	Ret	Ret	14	17^{†}	16	10	Ret	DNS	13	Ret	11			0	NC
2002	PS02	Asiatech AT02 3.0 V10	M		AUS	MAL	BRA	SMR	ESP	AUT	MON	CAN	EUR	GBR	FRA	GER	HUN	BEL	ITA	USA	JPN			2	9th
2002	PS02	Asiatech AT02 3.0 V10	M	(Malaysia) Alex Yoong	7	Ret	13	DNQ	DNS	Ret	Ret	14	Ret	DNQ	10	DNQ			13	Ret	Ret			2	9th
2002	PS02	Asiatech AT02 3.0 V10	M	(United Kingdom) Anthony Davidson													Ret	Ret						2	9th
2002	PS02	Asiatech AT02 3.0 V10	M	(Australia) Mark Webber	5	Ret	11	11	DNS	12	11	11	15	Ret	8	Ret	16	Ret	Ret	Ret	10			2	9th
2003	PS03	Cosworth CR-3 3.0 V10	B		AUS	MAL	BRA	SMR	ESP	AUT	MON	CAN	EUR	FRA	GBR	GER	HUN	ITA	USA	JPN				0	10th
2003	PS03	Cosworth CR-3 3.0 V10	B	(United Kingdom) Justin Wilson	Ret	Ret	Ret	Ret	11	13	Ret	Ret	13	14	16									0	10th
2003	PS03	Cosworth CR-3 3.0 V10	B	(Denmark) Nicolas Kiesa												12	13	12	11	16				0	10th
2003	PS03	Cosworth CR-3 3.0 V10	B	(Netherlands) Jos Verstappen	11	13	Ret	Ret	12	Ret	Ret	9	14	16	15	Ret	12	Ret	10	15				0	10th
2004	PS04B	Cosworth CR-3L 3.0 V10	B		AUS	MAL	BHR	SMR	ESP	MON	EUR	CAN	USA	FRA	GBR	GER	HUN	BEL	ITA	CHN	JPN	BRA		1	10th
2004	PS04B	Cosworth CR-3L 3.0 V10	B	(Italy) Gianmaria Bruni	NC	14	17	Ret	Ret	Ret	14	Ret	Ret	18^{†}	16	17	14	Ret	Ret	Ret	16	17		1	10th
2004	PS04B	Cosworth CR-3L 3.0 V10	B	(Hungary) Zsolt Baumgartner	Ret	16	Ret	15	Ret	9	15	10	8	Ret	Ret	16	15	Ret	15	16	Ret	16		1	10th
2005	PS04B; PS05	Cosworth CR-3L 3.0 V10; Cosworth TJ2005 3.0 V10	B		AUS	MAL	BHR	SMR	ESP	MON	EUR	CAN	USA	FRA	GBR	GER	HUN	TUR	ITA	BEL	BRA	JPN	CHN	7	10th
2005	PS04B; PS05	Cosworth CR-3L 3.0 V10; Cosworth TJ2005 3.0 V10	B	(Austria) Patrick Friesacher	17	Ret	12	Ret	Ret	Ret	18	Ret	6	Ret	19									7	10th
2005	PS04B; PS05	Cosworth CR-3L 3.0 V10; Cosworth TJ2005 3.0 V10	B	(Monaco) Robert Doornbos												18	Ret	13	18	13	Ret	14	14^{†}	7	10th
2005	PS04B; PS05	Cosworth CR-3L 3.0 V10; Cosworth TJ2005 3.0 V10	B	(Netherlands) Christijan Albers	Ret	13	13	Ret	Ret	14	17	11	5	Ret	18	13	NC	Ret	19	12	14	16	16^{†}	7	10th

== See also ==
- List of Formula One constructors
