= Simod =

Italian sportswear manufacturer

Simod is an Italian sportswear manufacturer, based in Piove di Sacco. The company specialises in sports footwear, such as training shoes, running shoes and football boots, although they also design casual footwear not intended for use in sport.

The company was founded by Paolo Sinigaglia in 1967 when he was just over twenty years old, borrowing the first machines for gluing shoe soles.

Simod sponsored the English Full Members Cup professional football competition from 1987 to 1989, during which time the competition was known as the Simod Cup.

In 2015, Simod was declared bankrupt due to a debt of €50 million.

== Minardi Formula One (1985–1993) ==
Amongst other sponsorships, they were a named sponsor of the Italian Minardi Formula 1 team for a number of years during the 1980s.

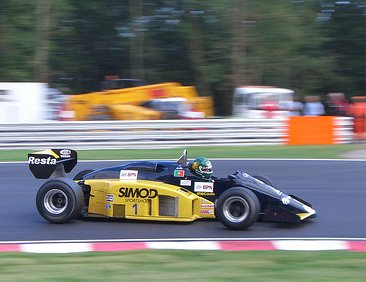
1985 vintage Minardi M185 driven by Rodrigo Gallego at a Thoroughbred Grand Prix event at Brands Hatch in September 2005
