= Giacomo Caliri =

Italian former Formula One engineer

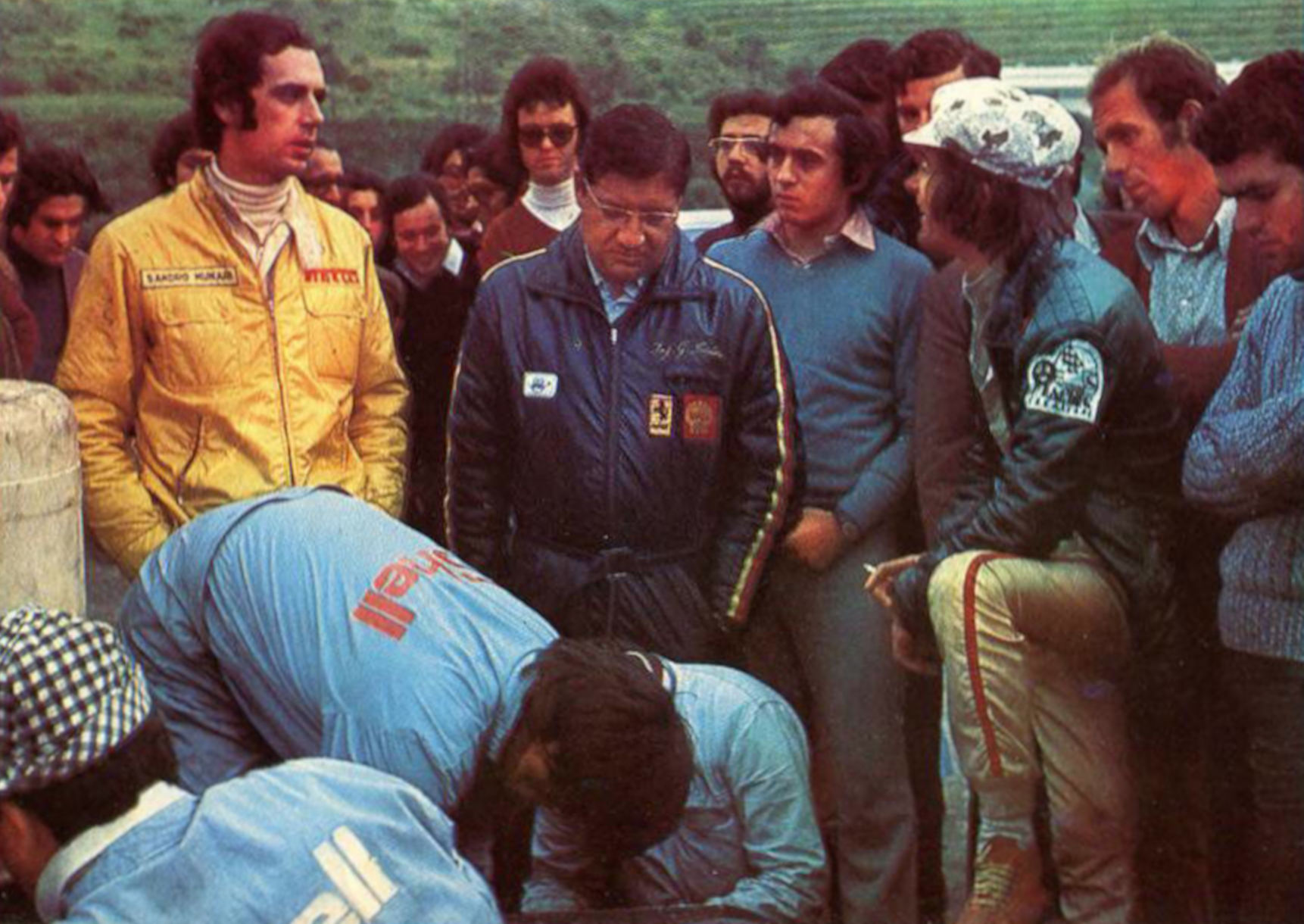
Caliri, between drivers Sandro Munari (left) and Arturo Merzario (right), leading Ferrari activities prior to the winning 56th Targa Florio, May 1972

Giacomo Caliri (born 29 July 1940 in Catania) is an Italian former Formula One engineer.

His racing career began in 1966 when Caliri graduated from Turin Polytechnic with a prize-winning thesis on aerodynamics.

He joined Ferrari in 1964 and became the head of aerodynamic studies in the racing department in 1969, replacing Mauro Forghieri who had moved to Ferrari's F1 department for the 1970 season. By 1974, he was the head of the design office at the Fiorano Circuit. He left Ferrari in 1976 and set up FLY Studio in Modena with his former Ferrari colleague Luigi Marmiroli, working in conjunction with Autodelta, Fittipaldi Automotive, designing the F5A, and ATS designing the ATS D2 on the design of competition cars.

He joined the Minardi Formula Two team in 1980 and became a stockholder of the Italian team. He became the technical director of the team in Formula One in 1985 and also designed the first Minardi Formula One car, the Minardi M185. He left Minardi in 1989 and also sold his stock in the team.

He joined the new Forti team and was one of the designers of the team's FG01 chassis for the 1995 season.

He joined Maserati as technical director. In 1997 he returned in Ferrari as the head of the Innovation Department. He left Ferrari in 2002 and started as a consultant for the ATR group.

Since 2004, he is the president of Expotecnica.
