= 2017 Hungarian Grand Prix =

Formula One race

Race 11 of 20 in the 2017 Formula One World Championship
← Previous race	Next race →
- Layout of the Hungaroring circuit

Race details
- Date: 30 July 2017
- Official name: Formula 1 Pirelli Magyar Nagydíj 2017
- Location: Hungaroring; Mogyoród, Hungary
- Course: Permanent racing facility
- Course length: 4.381 km (2.722 miles)
- Distance: 70 laps, 306.630 km (190.531 miles)
- Weather: Sunny
- Attendance: 199,000

Pole position
Driver	(Germany) Sebastian Vettel	Ferrari
- Time: 1:16.276

Fastest lap
Driver	(Spain) Fernando Alonso	McLaren-Honda
- Time: 1:20.182 on lap 69

Podium
First	(Germany) Sebastian Vettel	Ferrari
Second	(Finland) Kimi Räikkönen	Ferrari
Third	(Finland) Valtteri Bottas	Mercedes

The 2017 Hungarian Grand Prix (formally the Formula 1 Pirelli Magyar Nagydíj 2017) was a Formula One motor race that took place on 30 July 2017 at the Hungaroring in Mogyoród, Hungary. The 2017 event was the 32nd time that the race has been run as a World Championship event since the inaugural race in 1986, every single time at the Hungaroring.

The race was won by Sebastian Vettel, ahead of Kimi Räikkönen and Valtteri Bottas.

== Background ==
Ferrari’s Sebastian Vettel entered the round leading the World Drivers' Championship by one point ahead of Mercedes's Lewis Hamilton. In the World Constructors' Championship, Mercedes led Ferrari by fifty-five points.

Williams's Felipe Massa was taken ill after Practice 3. Massa had been unwell and dizzy on Friday but was certified as fit to compete in Practice 3 by the medical staff. Massa did not feel any better during Practice 3, and his seat was taken by Williams reserve driver Paul di Resta for qualifying and the race.

== Practice ==
Red Bull's Daniel Ricciardo went fastest in first practice, setting a time of 1:18.486. He was followed by the Ferrari of Kimi Räikkönen and the Mercedes of Lewis Hamilton in second and third. In second practice, Ricciardo again set the fastest time followed by Vettel and Bottas. Saturday's third and final practice was topped by Vettel, with Räikkönen second and Bottas third. Vettel set the quickest time of all three practices with a 1:17.017.

== Qualifying ==
In the first segment of qualifying, Williams reserve driver di Resta made his first start since the 2013 Brazilian Grand Prix and quickly got up to speed with little prior practice. Di Resta's only experience in a hybrid F1 car consisted of 10 laps in a 2014-spec car and some laps in the simulator prior to the Australian Grand Prix. Di Resta qualified 19th in a car with Massa's settings, a performance that was described as "unbelievable" by Mercedes boss Toto Wolff. Di Resta later admitted that he was "scared, nervous, [and] anxious" about how he would perform given his lack of experience.

In the third segment of qualifying, Sebastian Vettel secured pole position with a time of 1:16.276. His teammate Kimi Räikkönen secured second place, thus giving Ferrari its first qualifying 1–2 in Hungary since 2004. Mercedes locked out the second row on the grid, Red Bull locked out the third row on the grid, and McLaren-Honda locked out the fourth row of the grid in its best qualifying performance of the season.

=== Qualifying classification ===
Pos.	Car no.	Driver	Constructor	Qualifying times			Final grid
Pos.	Car no.	Driver	Constructor	Q1	Q2	Q3	Final grid
1	5	(Germany) Sebastian Vettel	Ferrari	1:17.244	1:16.802	1:16.276	1
2	7	(Finland) Kimi Räikkönen	Ferrari	1:17.364	1:17.207	1:16.444	2
3	77	(Finland) Valtteri Bottas	Mercedes	1:18.058	1:17.362	1:16.530	3
4	44	(United Kingdom) Lewis Hamilton	Mercedes	1:17.492	1:16.693	1:16.707	4
5	33	(Netherlands) Max Verstappen	Red Bull Racing-TAG Heuer	1:17.266	1:17.028	1:16.797	5
6	3	(Australia) Daniel Ricciardo	Red Bull Racing-TAG Heuer	1:17.702	1:17.698	1:16.818	6
7	27	(Germany) Nico Hülkenberg	Renault	1:18.137	1:17.655	1:17.468	12^{1}
8	14	(Spain) Fernando Alonso	McLaren-Honda	1:18.395	1:17.919	1:17.549	7
9	2	(Belgium) Stoffel Vandoorne	McLaren-Honda	1:18.479	1:18.000	1:17.894	8
10	55	(Spain) Carlos Sainz Jr.	Toro Rosso	1:18.948	1:18.311	1:18.912	9
11	30	(United Kingdom) Jolyon Palmer	Renault	1:18.699	1:18.415		10
12	31	(France) Esteban Ocon	Force India-Mercedes	1:18.843	1:18.495		11
13	26	(Russia) Daniil Kvyat	Toro Rosso	1:18.702	1:18.538		16^{2}
14	11	(Mexico) Sergio Pérez	Force India-Mercedes	1:19.095^{3}	1:18.639		13
15	8	(France) Romain Grosjean	Haas-Ferrari	1:19.085	1:18.771		14
16	20	(Denmark) Kevin Magnussen	Haas-Ferrari	1:19.095^{3}			15
17	18	(Canada) Lance Stroll	Williams-Mercedes	1:19.102			17
18	94	(Germany) Pascal Wehrlein	Sauber-Ferrari	1:19.839			18
19	40	(United Kingdom) Paul di Resta	Williams-Mercedes	1:19.868			19
20	9	(Sweden) Marcus Ericsson	Sauber-Ferrari	1:19.972			20
107% time: 1:22.651

Notes

- ^1 – Nico Hülkenberg received a five-place grid penalty for an unscheduled gearbox change.
- ^2 – Daniil Kvyat received a three-place grid penalty for impeding Lance Stroll during Q1.
- ^3 – Sergio Pérez and Kevin Magnussen set identical lap times in Q1. As Pérez was the first to set his time, he was considered to have qualified ahead of Magnussen.

== Race ==
At the start of the race, Vettel stayed ahead of his teammate, Räikkönen, and Bottas after Verstappen tried to go around the outside of Räikkönen and Bottas. Being forced off the track by Bottas, Verstappen went onto the curbs and was almost passed by his Red Bull teammate Daniel Ricciardo. Ricciardo and Verstappen collided at turn 2, after Verstappen's tyres locked up. This caused Ricciardo's radiator to break, forcing him to retire. Verstappen subsequently received a 10-second penalty for causing the incident. Ricciardo condemned Verstappen and called the incident "an amateur error". Verstappen later apologised for the incident.

The safety car was called out to clear Ricciardo's stricken Red Bull car and clean up oil from the track surface. The safety car went in at the end of lap 5. Romain Grosjean pitted on lap 21 with a slow leak on front left tyre and was released with a loose wheel-nut. His car had to be retired on lap 22 and Haas F1 Team was fined €5,000 for releasing Grosjean in unsafe conditions.

On lap 25 Vettel started to notice his steering pulling left on the straights. He was instructed to avoid the kerbs and his lap times slowed, allowing teammate Kimi Räikkönen and the two Mercedes to catch up. Kimi Räikkönen radioed to Ferrari that he wanted to get Vettel to move aside on lap 39 as Vettel was having problems and Räikkönen was putting in quicker lap times. Ferrari ordered Vettel to speed up and Räikkönen kept up with him, and they both gradually increased the gap to both Mercedes cars. Lap 44, still having radio issues, Lewis Hamilton informed his engineer he had good pace and wanted around Valtteri Bottas. On lap 46 Hamilton was allowed past teammate Bottas and given 10 laps to try and get past Räikkönen, using a higher engine setting. Mercedes promised Bottas that if Hamilton could not get past, they would switch the cars back.

With nine laps to go, Nico Hülkenberg was forced off track by Kevin Magnussen and subsequently had to retire his car due to issues with the brakes and the gearbox. Magnussen was later given a five-second penalty for his actions, which were described as "nasty" by Hülkenberg. Hülkenberg condemned Magnussen and called him "the most unsporting driver on the grid". Magnussen responded with "suck my balls, mate" which received wide attention.

With Verstappen closing in, it appeared as if the switch back was not going to happen, but coming out of the last corner on the last lap, Hamilton slowed down, allowing Bottas past to claim the podium. Hamilton finished fourth, with Verstappen in fifth. McLaren-Honda got their first double-points finish of the season with Alonso finishing sixth and Vandoorne tenth. This result moved them out of last place in the Constructors' standings. Carlos Sainz Jr. finished seventh for Toro Rosso. Force India got a double-points finish with Pérez in eighth and Ocon in ninth. As a result of the race, Vettel extended his lead in the Drivers' Championship over Hamilton to 14 points. Mercedes's lead in the Constructors' Championship was reduced to 39 points over Ferrari.

=== Race classification ===
Pos.	No.	Driver	Constructor	Laps	Time/Retired	Grid	Points
1	5	(Germany) Sebastian Vettel	Ferrari	70	1:39:46.713	1	25
2	7	(Finland) Kimi Räikkönen	Ferrari	70	+0.908	2	18
3	77	(Finland) Valtteri Bottas	Mercedes	70	+12.462	3	15
4	44	(United Kingdom) Lewis Hamilton	Mercedes	70	+12.885	4	12
5	33	(Netherlands) Max Verstappen	Red Bull Racing-TAG Heuer	70	+13.276	5	10
6	14	(Spain) Fernando Alonso	McLaren-Honda	70	+1:11.223	7	8
7	55	(Spain) Carlos Sainz Jr.	Toro Rosso	69	+1 Lap	9	6
8	11	(Mexico) Sergio Pérez	Force India-Mercedes	69	+1 Lap	13	4
9	31	(France) Esteban Ocon	Force India-Mercedes	69	+1 Lap	11	2
10	2	(Belgium) Stoffel Vandoorne	McLaren-Honda	69	+1 Lap	8	1
11	26	(Russia) Daniil Kvyat	Toro Rosso	69	+1 Lap	16	
12	30	(United Kingdom) Jolyon Palmer	Renault	69	+1 Lap	10	
13^{1}	20	(Denmark) Kevin Magnussen	Haas-Ferrari	69	+1 Lap	15	
14	18	(Canada) Lance Stroll	Williams-Mercedes	69	+1 Lap	17	
15	94	(Germany) Pascal Wehrlein	Sauber-Ferrari	68	+2 Laps	18	
16	9	(Sweden) Marcus Ericsson	Sauber-Ferrari	68	+2 Laps	20	
17^{2}	27	(Germany) Nico Hülkenberg	Renault	67	Brakes	12	
Ret	40	(United Kingdom) Paul di Resta	Williams-Mercedes	60	Oil leak	19	
Ret	8	(France) Romain Grosjean	Haas-Ferrari	20	Wheel nut	14	
Ret	3	(Australia) Daniel Ricciardo	Red Bull Racing-TAG Heuer	0	Radiator	6	

Notes

- ^1 – Kevin Magnussen had 5 seconds added to his race time for forcing Nico Hülkenberg off the track.
- ^2 – Nico Hülkenberg retired from the race, but was classified as he had completed 90% of the race distance.

== Championship standings after the race ==
Drivers' Championship standings

Pos.	Driver	Points
1	(Germany) Sebastian Vettel	202
2	(United Kingdom) Lewis Hamilton	188
3	(Finland) Valtteri Bottas	169
4	(Australia) Daniel Ricciardo	117
5	(Finland) Kimi Räikkönen	116

Constructors' Championship standings

Pos.	Constructor	Points
1	(Germany) Mercedes	357
2	(Italy) Ferrari	318
3	(Austria) Red Bull Racing-TAG Heuer	184
4	Force India-Mercedes	101
5	(United Kingdom) Williams-Mercedes	41

- Note: Only the top five positions are included for both sets of standings.

== See also ==
- 2017 Budapest Formula 2 round
- 2017 Budapest GP3 Series round

Previous race: 2017 British Grand Prix	FIA Formula One World Championship; 2017 season	Next race: 2017 Belgian Grand Prix
Previous race: 2016 Hungarian Grand Prix	Hungarian Grand Prix	Next race: 2018 Hungarian Grand Prix
