= 1986 Hungarian Grand Prix =

- Race 11 of 16 in the 1986 Formula One World Championship

Race details
- Date: 10 August 1986
- Official name: Magyar Nagydíj
- Location: Hungaroring, Mogyoród, Hungary
- Course: Permanent racing facility
- Course length: 4.014 km (2.494 miles)
- Distance: 76 laps, 305.064 km (189.599 miles)
- Attendance: 200,000

Pole position
Driver	(Brazil) Ayrton Senna	Lotus-Renault
- Time: 1:29.450

Fastest lap
Driver	(Brazil) Nelson Piquet	Williams-Honda
- Time: 1:31.001 on lap 73

Podium
First	(Brazil) Nelson Piquet	Williams-Honda
Second	(Brazil) Ayrton Senna	Lotus-Renault
Third	(United Kingdom) Nigel Mansell	Williams-Honda

The 1986 Hungarian Grand Prix was a Formula One motor race held at the newly constructed Hungaroring on 10 August 1986. It was the eleventh race of the 1986 Formula One World Championship.

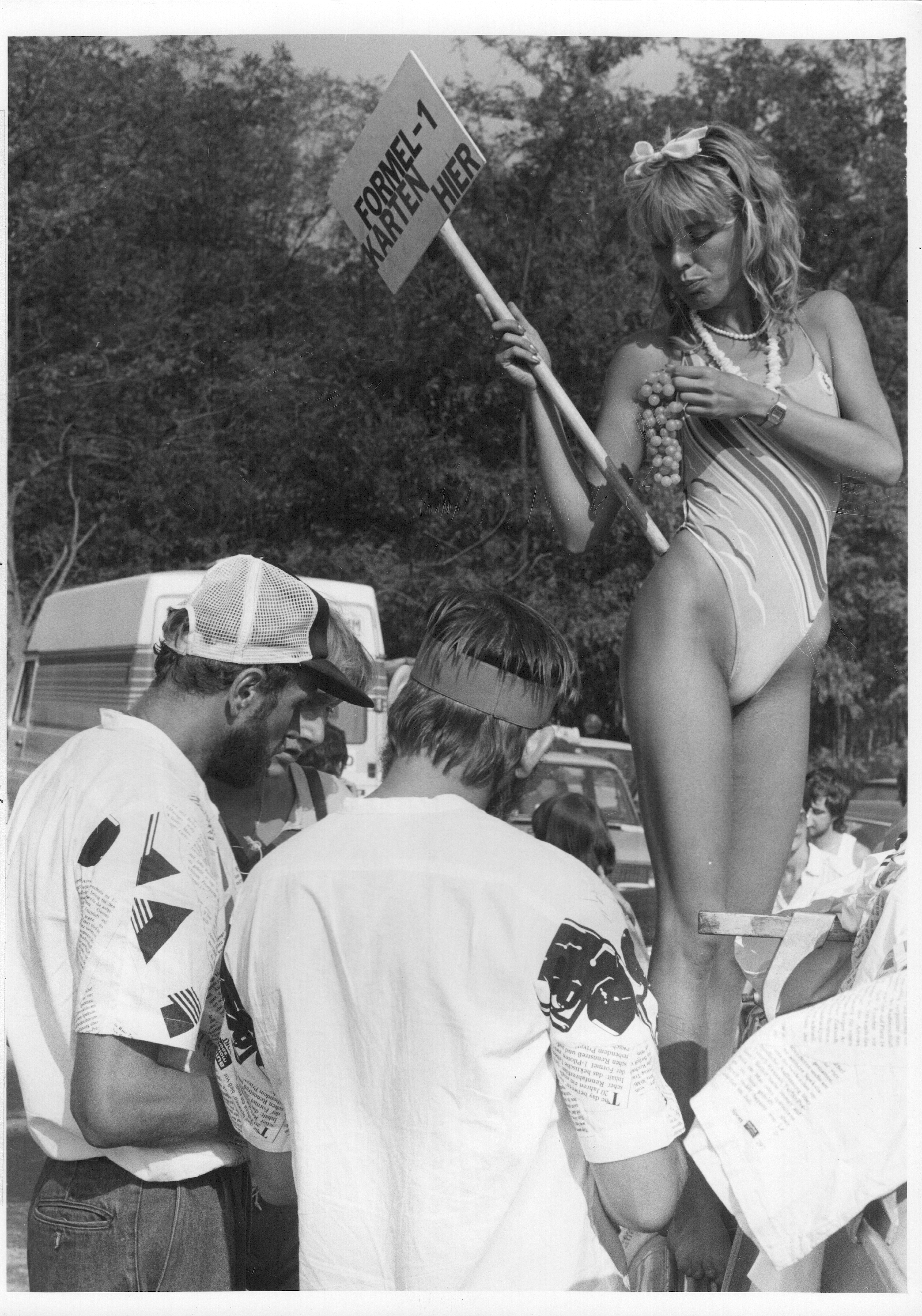
Selling cards at the 1986 Hungarian Race on 10 August 1986

It was the first Hungarian Grand Prix since 1936, and the first-ever Formula One race to be held behind the Iron Curtain. The race was attended by 200,000 spectators from across the Eastern Bloc; this stood as a record for a Formula One race for nearly a decade, until 210,000 attended the 1995 Australian Grand Prix in Adelaide.

The race was notable for the battle between fierce Brazilian rivals Nelson Piquet in his Williams-Honda and Ayrton Senna in his Lotus-Renault. Piquet, after an unsuccessful attempt on the previous lap, managed to pass the Lotus driver around the outside as they went into the first corner, on opposite lock. He also came in for some criticism following the race, especially in the British press, as he had allegedly neglected to tell his team-mate Nigel Mansell about the benefits of a new differential which provided better grip on the slippery, dusty surface (however, it later came to light that Mansell had in fact tried the new diff in practice but had preferred the older one).

The race was won by Piquet, ahead of Senna. Mansell finished 3rd and a lap down in his Williams with Stefan Johansson (Ferrari), Johnny Dumfries (Lotus) and Martin Brundle (Tyrrell-Renault) rounding out the points finishers. Defending World Champion Alain Prost qualified 3rd in his McLaren-TAG, an accident on lap 23 saw him as a non-finisher in what was his 100th Grand Prix start.

== Gallery ==
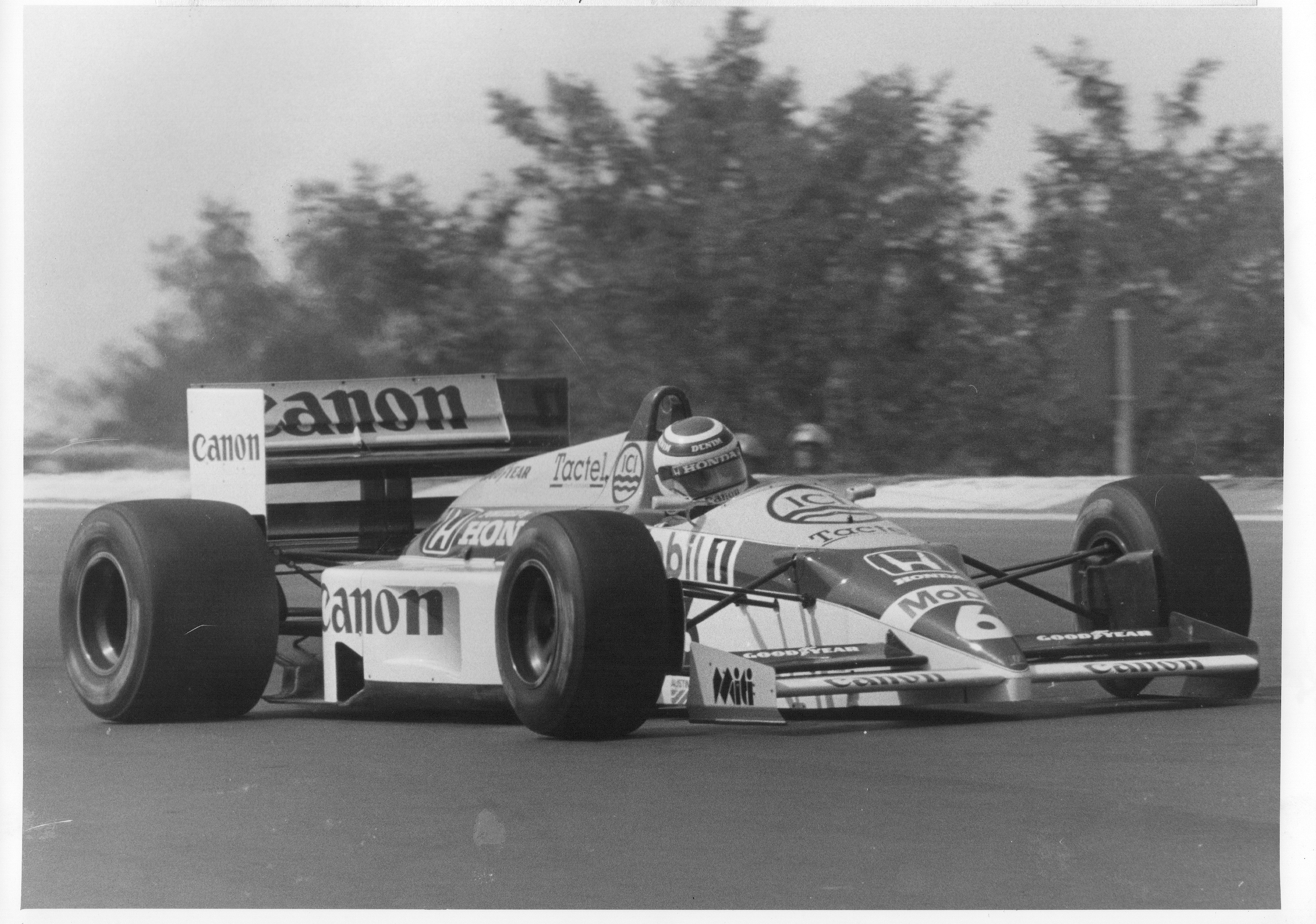
Nelson Piquet, the winner

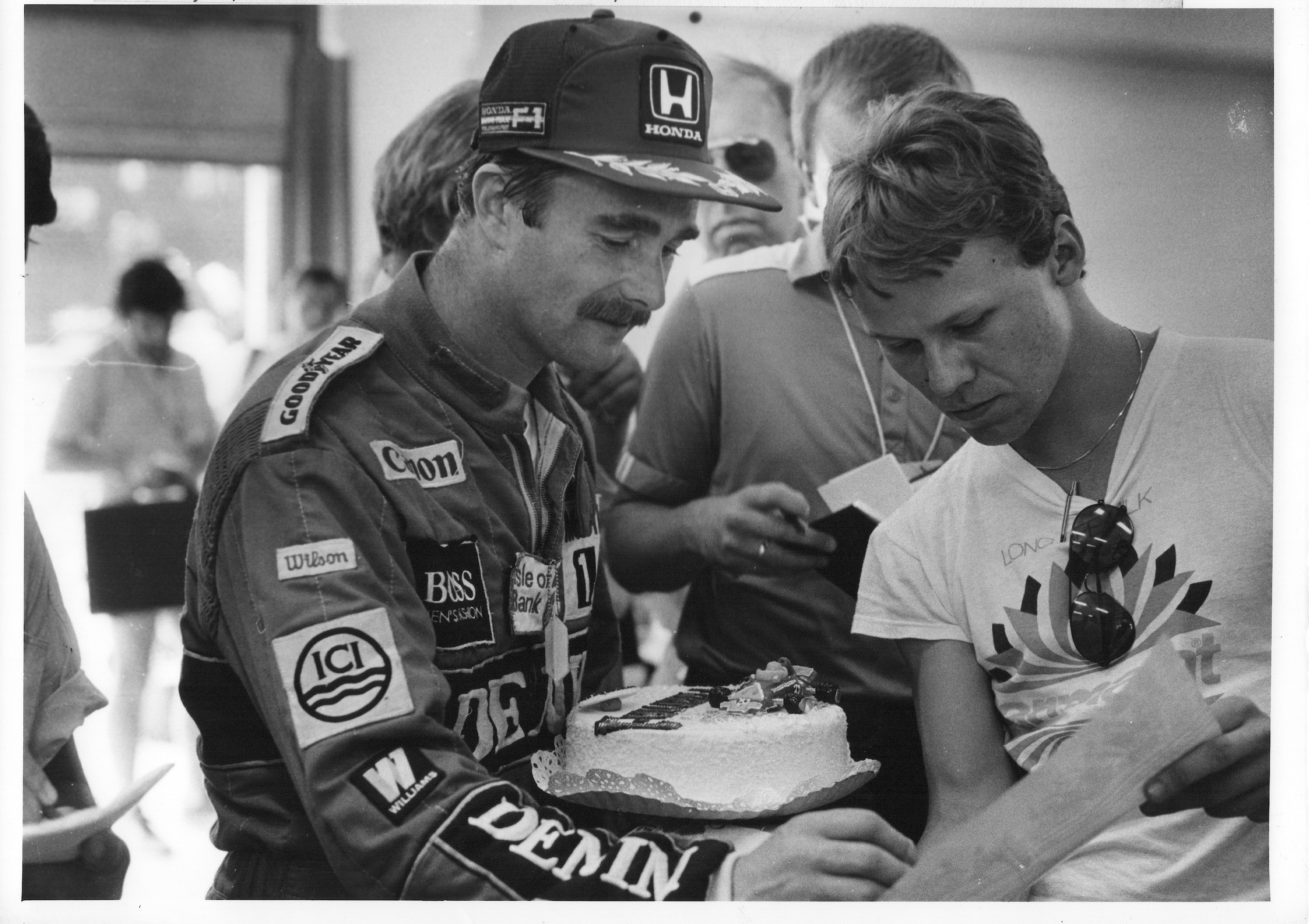
Nigel Mansell signing his autograph

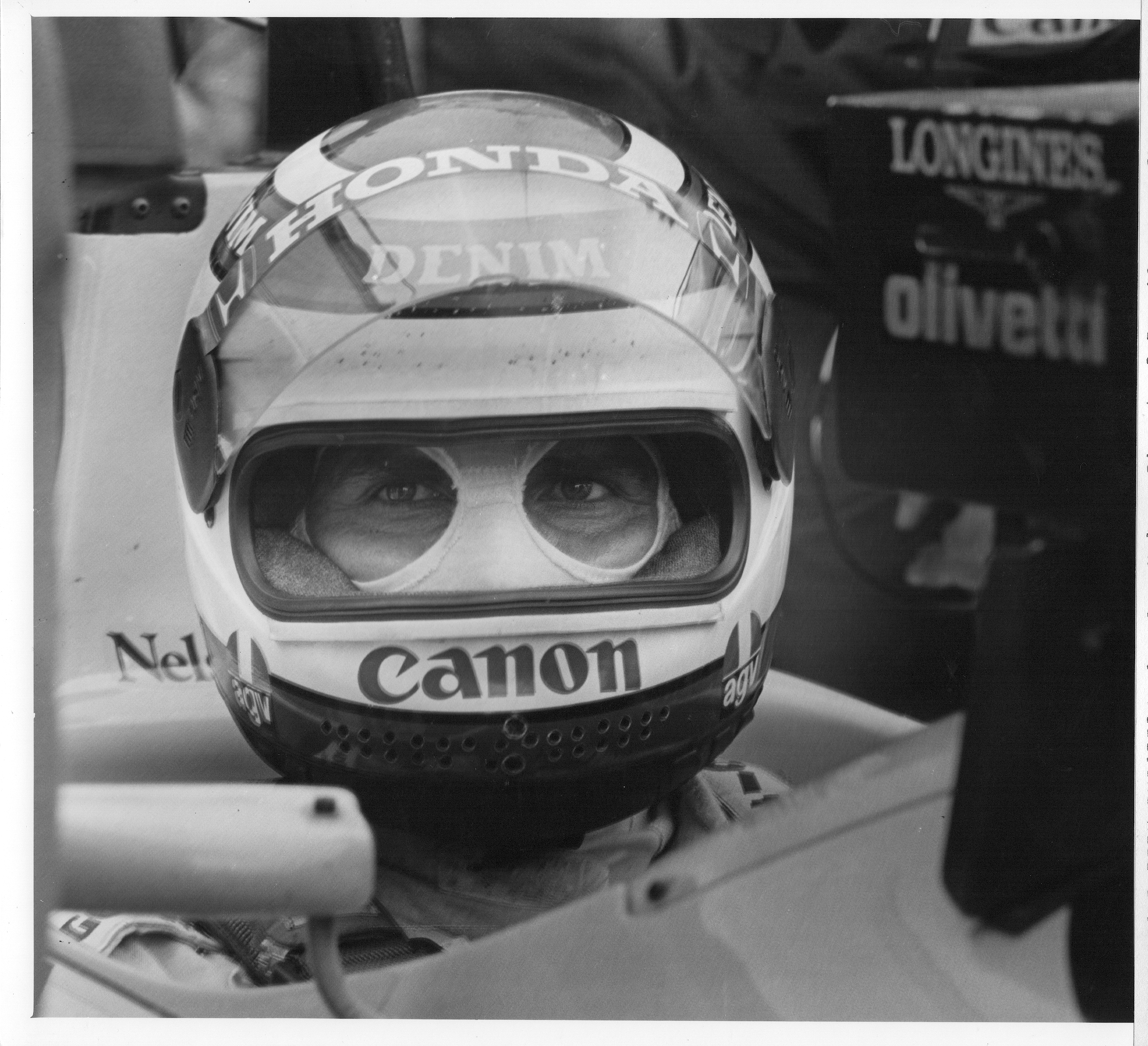
Nelson Piquet in his helmet

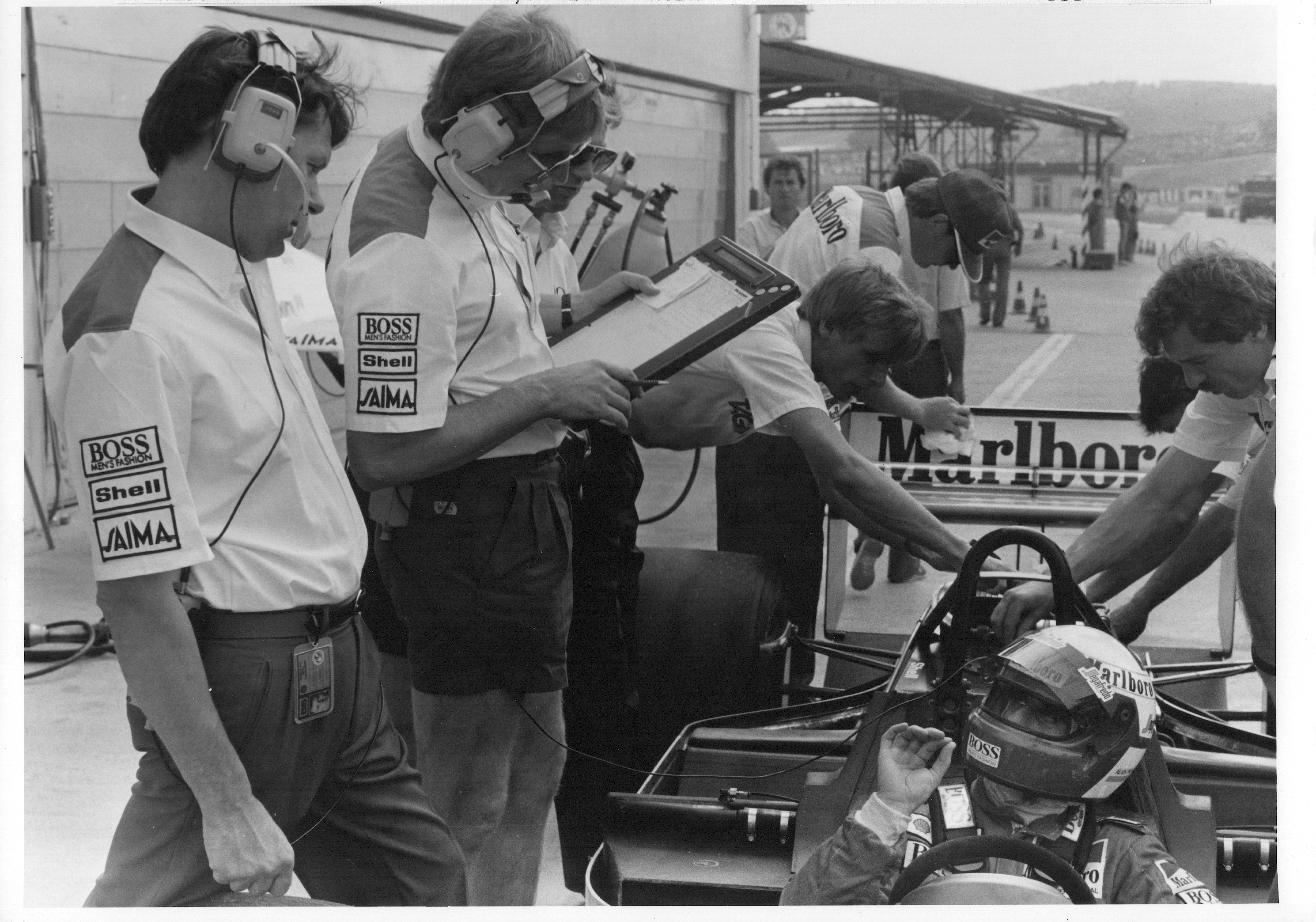
Alain Prost and his helpers

== Classification ==
=== Qualifying ===
Pos	No	Driver	Constructor	Q1	Q2	Gap
1	12	(Brazil) Ayrton Senna	Lotus-Renault	1:32.281	1:29.450	
2	6	(Brazil) Nelson Piquet	Williams-Honda	1:31.417	1:29.785	+0.335
3	1	(France) Alain Prost	McLaren-TAG	1:33.113	1:29.945	+0.495
4	5	(United Kingdom) Nigel Mansell	Williams-Honda	1:30.516	1:30.072	+0.622
5	2	(Finland) Keke Rosberg	McLaren-TAG	1:34.146	1:30.268	+0.818
6	16	(France) Patrick Tambay	Lola-Ford	1:34.187	1:31.715	+2.265
7	28	(Sweden) Stefan Johansson	Ferrari	1:35.092	1:31.850	+2.400
8	11	(United Kingdom) Johnny Dumfries	Lotus-Renault	1:36.108	1:31.886	+2.436
9	25	(France) René Arnoux	Ligier-Renault	1:36.552	1:31.970	+2.520
10	15	(Australia) Alan Jones	Lola-Ford	1:33.737	1:32.401	+2.951
11	20	(Austria) Gerhard Berger	Benetton-BMW	1:32.886	1:32.491	+3.041
12	26	(France) Philippe Alliot	Ligier-Renault	1:35.129	1:32.575	+3.125
13	19	(Italy) Teo Fabi	Benetton-BMW	1:35.265	1:32.707	+3.257
14	7	(Italy) Riccardo Patrese	Brabham-BMW	1:35.337	1:32.956	+3.506
15	27	(Italy) Michele Alboreto	Ferrari	1:34.255	1:33.063	+3.613
16	3	(United Kingdom) Martin Brundle	Tyrrell-Renault	1:34.725	1:33.368	+3.918
17	24	(Italy) Alessandro Nannini	Minardi-Motori Moderni	1:36.266	1:33.656	+4.206
18	4	(France) Philippe Streiff	Tyrrell-Renault	1:35.831	1:34.414	+4.964
19	8	(United Kingdom) Derek Warwick	Brabham-BMW	1:34.561	1:34.502	+5.052
20	23	(Italy) Andrea de Cesaris	Minardi-Motori Moderni	1:37.796	1:34.670	+5.220
21	17	(West Germany) Christian Danner	Arrows-BMW	1:36.540	1:35.294	+5.884
22	18	(Belgium) Thierry Boutsen	Arrows-BMW	1:37.268	1:35.392	+5.942
23	21	(Italy) Piercarlo Ghinzani	Osella-Alfa Romeo	1:39.564	1:36.232	+6.782
24	14	(United Kingdom) Jonathan Palmer	Zakspeed	1:37.937	1:36.485	+7.035
25	29	(Netherlands) Huub Rothengatter	Zakspeed	1:42.736	1:38.527	+9.077
26	22	(Canada) Allen Berg	Osella-Alfa Romeo	1:40.984	35:16.483	+11.534

=== Race ===
Pos	No	Driver	Constructor	Laps	Time/Retired	Grid	Points
1	6	(Brazil) Nelson Piquet	Williams-Honda	76	2:00:34.508	2	9
2	12	(Brazil) Ayrton Senna	Lotus-Renault	76	+ 17.673	1	6
3	5	(United Kingdom) Nigel Mansell	Williams-Honda	75	+ 1 lap	4	4
4	28	(Sweden) Stefan Johansson	Ferrari	75	+ 1 lap	7	3
5	11	(United Kingdom) Johnny Dumfries	Lotus-Renault	74	+ 2 laps	8	2
6	3	(United Kingdom) Martin Brundle	Tyrrell-Renault	74	+ 2 laps	16	1
7	16	(France) Patrick Tambay	Lola-Ford	74	+ 2 laps	6	
8	4	(France) Philippe Streiff	Tyrrell-Renault	74	+ 2 laps	18	
9	26	(France) Philippe Alliot	Ligier-Renault	73	+ 3 laps	12	
10	14	(United Kingdom) Jonathan Palmer	Zakspeed	70	+ 6 laps	24	
Ret	25	(France) René Arnoux	Ligier-Renault	48	Engine	9	
Ret	15	(Australia) Alan Jones	Lola-Ford	46	Differential	10	
Ret	20	(Austria) Gerhard Berger	Benetton-BMW	44	Transmission	11	
Ret	18	(Belgium) Thierry Boutsen	Arrows-BMW	40	Electrical	22	
Ret	2	(Finland) Keke Rosberg	McLaren-TAG	34	Suspension	5	
Ret	19	(Italy) Teo Fabi	Benetton-BMW	32	Transmission	13	
Ret	24	(Italy) Alessandro Nannini	Minardi-Motori Moderni	30	Engine	17	
Ret	27	(Italy) Michele Alboreto	Ferrari	29	Accident	15	
Ret	8	(United Kingdom) Derek Warwick	Brabham-BMW	28	Accident	19	
Ret	1	(France) Alain Prost	McLaren-TAG	23	Suspension/Accident	3	
Ret	21	(Italy) Piercarlo Ghinzani	Osella-Alfa Romeo	15	Suspension	23	
Ret	17	(Germany) Christian Danner	Arrows-BMW	7	Suspension	21	
Ret	7	(Italy) Riccardo Patrese	Brabham-BMW	5	Gearbox	14	
Ret	23	(Italy) Andrea de Cesaris	Minardi-Motori Moderni	5	Engine	20	
Ret	29	(Netherlands) Huub Rothengatter	Zakspeed	2	Radiator	25	
Ret	22	(Canada) Allen Berg	Osella-Alfa Romeo	1	Turbo	26	

== Championship standings after the race ==
Drivers' Championship standings

Pos	Driver	Points
1	(United Kingdom) Nigel Mansell	55
2	(Brazil) Ayrton Senna	48
3	(Brazil) Nelson Piquet	47
4	(France) Alain Prost	44
5	(Finland) Keke Rosberg	19

Constructors' Championship standings

Pos	Constructor	Points
1	(United Kingdom) Williams-Honda	102
2	(United Kingdom) McLaren-TAG	63
3	(United Kingdom) Lotus-Renault	50
4	(France) Ligier-Renault	28
5	(Italy) Ferrari	16

- Note: Only the top five positions are included for both sets of standings.

Previous race: 1986 German Grand Prix	FIA Formula One World Championship; 1986 season	Next race: 1986 Austrian Grand Prix
Previous race: 1936 Hungarian Grand Prix	Hungarian Grand Prix	Next race: 1987 Hungarian Grand Prix
