= 2016 Hungarian Grand Prix =

Race 11 of 21 in the 2016 Formula One World Championship
← Previous race	Next race →
- Layout of the Hungaroring circuit

Race details
- Date: 24 July 2016
- Official name: Formula 1 Magyar Nagydíj 2016
- Location: Hungaroring; Mogyoród, Hungary
- Course: Permanent racing facility
- Course length: 4.381 km (2.722 miles)
- Distance: 70 laps, 306.630 km (190.539 miles)
- Weather: Sunny
- Attendance: 176,000 (Weekend)

Pole position
Driver	(Germany) Nico Rosberg	Mercedes
- Time: 1:19.965

Fastest lap
Driver	(Finland) Kimi Räikkönen	Ferrari
- Time: 1:23.086 on lap 52

Podium
First	(United Kingdom) Lewis Hamilton	Mercedes
Second	(Germany) Nico Rosberg	Mercedes
Third	(Australia) Daniel Ricciardo	Red Bull Racing-TAG Heuer

The 2016 Hungarian Grand Prix (formally known as the Formula 1 Magyar Nagydíj 2016) was a Formula One motor race that was held on 24 July 2016 at the Hungaroring in Mogyoród, Hungary. It was the eleventh round of the 2016 FIA Formula One World Championship and the 32nd running of the Hungarian Grand Prix, and 31st time it had been held as a round of the World Championship.

Mercedes driver Nico Rosberg entered the round with a one-point lead over teammate Lewis Hamilton in the Drivers' Championship while Mercedes led in the Constructors' Championship ahead of Ferrari. The race was won by Hamilton, with Rosberg and Daniel Ricciardo completing the podium, meaning Hamilton took over the lead in the Drivers' Championship after the race.

== Report ==
In the week before the race, the FIA revised the rules governing pit-to-car communications following criticism from the teams in light of a penalty given to Nico Rosberg at the British Grand Prix for receiving assistance outside those allowed under the regulations; and in the aftermath of Sergio Pérez's brake failure and subsequent retirement from the Austrian Grand Prix, which Force India was particularly critical of in light of the safety implications arising from Pérez's accident. The rules, first introduced during the 2015 season, were intended to crack down on driver coaching—stating that a competitor must drive the car "alone and unaided"—but allowing teams the scope to alert drivers to the imminent failure of components. Under the revisions introduced for the Hungarian Grand Prix, a car must pit or be retired immediately if an issue arises that is deemed serious enough to warrant intervention from the team. The revised regulations were poorly received, with Ferrari's Sebastian Vettel being particularly critical during interviews.

After introducing "baguette" kerbs at the Austrian Grand Prix as a means of policing track limits and prevent drivers from deliberately running wide to gain an advantage, the Hungarian Grand Prix saw the introduction of electronic monitoring at selected corners, with pressure-sensitive plates placed under kerbs to detect cars running wide, with the system tied to the car transponders to detect when a driver had run too wide.

Mixed conditions in the first qualifying session meant that a record eleven drivers failed to make the 107% time: Red Bull Racing's Max Verstappen and Daniel Ricciardo; Williams' Felipe Massa and Valtteri Bottas; Force India's Nico Hulkenberg and Sergio Pérez; Renault's Kevin Magnussen and Jolyon Palmer; Manor's Pascal Wehrlein and Rio Haryanto; and Sauber's Marcus Ericsson. Due to the exceptional circumstances, all eleven were permitted to start the race, and the fastest five - Ricciardo, Verstappen, Hulkenberg, Bottas, and Pérez - were allowed to proceed to Q2 as normal.

Lewis Hamilton took a comfortable win ahead of his teammate Rosberg, their only challenge came from Daniel Ricciardo who did threaten but ultimately faded away before finishing in 3rd place holding off a charge from Ferrari's Sebastian Vettel. Jenson Button was the only retirement from the race when he was instructed to stop after an oil leak in his McLaren in what he described as "A race from hell".

== Classification ==
=== Qualifying ===
Pos.	Car no.	Driver	Constructor	Qualifying times			Final grid
Pos.	Car no.	Driver	Constructor	Q1	Q2	Q3	Final grid
1	6	(Germany) Nico Rosberg	Mercedes	1:33.302	1:22.806	1:19.965	1
2	44	(United Kingdom) Lewis Hamilton	Mercedes	1:34.210	1:24.836	1:20.108	2
3	3	(Australia) Daniel Ricciardo^{1}	Red Bull Racing-TAG Heuer	1:39.968	1:23.234	1:20.280	3
4	33	(Netherlands) Max Verstappen^{1}	Red Bull Racing-TAG Heuer	1:40.424	1:22.660	1:20.557	4
5	5	(Germany) Sebastian Vettel	Ferrari	1:35.718	1:24.082	1:20.874	5
6	55	(Spain) Carlos Sainz Jr.	Toro Rosso-Ferrari	1:36.115	1:24.734	1:21.131	6
7	14	(Spain) Fernando Alonso	McLaren-Honda	1:35.165	1:23.816	1:21.211	7
8	22	(United Kingdom) Jenson Button	McLaren-Honda	1:37.983	1:24.456	1:21.597	8
9	27	(Germany) Nico Hülkenberg^{1}	Force India-Mercedes	1:41.471	1:23.901	1:21.823	9
10	77	(Finland) Valtteri Bottas^{1}	Williams-Mercedes	1:42.758	1:24.506	1:22.182	10
11	8	(France) Romain Grosjean	Haas-Ferrari	1:35.906	1:24.941		11
12	26	(Russia) Daniil Kvyat	Toro Rosso-Ferrari	1:36.714	1:25.301		12
13	11	(Mexico) Sergio Pérez^{1}	Force India-Mercedes	1:41.411	1:25.416		13
14	7	(Finland) Kimi Räikkönen	Ferrari	1:36.853	1:25.435		14
15	21	(Mexico) Esteban Gutiérrez	Haas-Ferrari	1:38.959	1:26.189		15
16	12	(Brazil) Felipe Nasr	Sauber-Ferrari	1:37.772	1:27.063		16
107% time: 1:39.833
—	30	(United Kingdom) Jolyon Palmer^{2}	Renault	1:43.965			17
—	19	(Brazil) Felipe Massa^{2}	Williams-Mercedes	1:43.999			18
—	20	(Denmark) Kevin Magnussen^{2}	Renault	1:44.543			19
—	9	(Sweden) Marcus Ericsson^{2}	Sauber-Ferrari	1:46.984			PL^{3}
—	94	(Germany) Pascal Wehrlein^{2}	MRT-Mercedes	1:47.343			20
—	88	(Indonesia) Rio Haryanto^{2}	MRT-Mercedes	1:50.189			21^{4}

Notes:

- ^1 – Daniel Ricciardo, Max Verstappen, Nico Hülkenberg, Valtteri Bottas and Sergio Pérez all failed to set lap times within 107% of the fastest time set in Q1. However, they were allowed to advance to Q2 with their Q1 times intact.
- ^2 – Jolyon Palmer, Felipe Massa, Kevin Magnussen, Marcus Ericsson, Pascal Wehrlein and Rio Haryanto all failed to set lap times within 107% of the fastest time set in Q1. Their participation in the race was permitted at the discretion of the stewards.
- ^3 – Marcus Ericsson was required to start from the pit lane after getting a new survival cell.
- ^4 – Rio Haryanto received a five-place grid penalty for an unscheduled gearbox change.

=== Race ===
Pos.	No.	Driver	Constructor	Laps	Time/Retired	Grid	Points
1	44	(United Kingdom) Lewis Hamilton	Mercedes	70	1:40:30.115	2	25
2	6	(Germany) Nico Rosberg	Mercedes	70	+1.977	1	18
3	3	(Australia) Daniel Ricciardo	Red Bull Racing-TAG Heuer	70	+27.539	3	15
4	5	(Germany) Sebastian Vettel	Ferrari	70	+28.213	5	12
5	33	(Netherlands) Max Verstappen	Red Bull Racing-TAG Heuer	70	+48.659	4	10
6	7	(Finland) Kimi Räikkönen	Ferrari	70	+49.044	14	8
7	14	(Spain) Fernando Alonso	McLaren-Honda	69	+1 Lap	7	6
8	55	(Spain) Carlos Sainz Jr.	Toro Rosso-Ferrari	69	+1 Lap	6	4
9	77	(Finland) Valtteri Bottas	Williams-Mercedes	69	+1 Lap	10	2
10	27	(Germany) Nico Hülkenberg	Force India-Mercedes	69	+1 Lap	9	1
11	11	(Mexico) Sergio Pérez	Force India-Mercedes	69	+1 Lap	13	
12	30	(United Kingdom) Jolyon Palmer	Renault	69	+1 Lap	17	
13^{1}	21	(Mexico) Esteban Gutiérrez	Haas-Ferrari	69	+1 Lap	15	
14	8	(France) Romain Grosjean	Haas-Ferrari	69	+1 Lap	11	
15	20	(Denmark) Kevin Magnussen	Renault	69	+1 Lap	19	
16	26	(Russia) Daniil Kvyat	Toro Rosso-Ferrari	69	+1 Lap	12	
17	12	(Brazil) Felipe Nasr	Sauber-Ferrari	69	+1 Lap	16	
18	19	(Brazil) Felipe Massa	Williams-Mercedes	68	+2 Laps	18	
19	94	(Germany) Pascal Wehrlein	MRT-Mercedes	68	+2 Laps	20	
20	9	(Sweden) Marcus Ericsson	Sauber-Ferrari	68	+2 Laps	PL	
21	88	(Indonesia) Rio Haryanto	MRT-Mercedes	68	+2 Laps	21	
Ret	22	(United Kingdom) Jenson Button	McLaren-Honda	60	Oil leak	8	

Notes

- ^1 – Esteban Gutiérrez originally finished 12th, but received a five-second time penalty after the race for ignoring blue flags.

== Championship standings after the race ==
Drivers' Championship standings

	Pos.	Driver	Points
1	1	(United Kingdom) Lewis Hamilton	192
1	2	(Germany) Nico Rosberg	186
1	3	(Australia) Daniel Ricciardo	115
1	4	(Finland) Kimi Räikkönen	114
	5	(Germany) Sebastian Vettel	110

Constructors' Championship standings

Pos.	Constructor	Points
1	(Germany) Mercedes	378
2	(Italy) Ferrari	224
3	(Austria) Red Bull Racing-TAG Heuer	223
4	(United Kingdom) Williams-Mercedes	94
5	Force India-Mercedes	74

- Note: Only the top five positions are included for both sets of standings.

== See also ==
- 2016 Hungaroring GP2 Series round
- 2016 Hungaroring GP3 Series round

Previous race: 2016 British Grand Prix	FIA Formula One World Championship; 2016 season	Next race: 2016 German Grand Prix
Previous race: 2015 Hungarian Grand Prix	Hungarian Grand Prix	Next race: 2017 Hungarian Grand Prix
