= 2015 Hungarian Grand Prix =

Race 10 of 19 in the 2015 Formula One World Championship
← Previous race	Next race →
- Layout of the Hungaroring circuit

Race details
- Date: 26 July 2015
- Official name: Formula 1 Pirelli Magyar Nagydíj 2015
- Location: Hungaroring; Mogyoród, Hungary
- Course: Permanent racing facility
- Course length: 4.381 km (2.722 miles)
- Distance: 69 laps, 302.249 km (187.809 miles)
- Scheduled distance: 70 laps, 306.630 km (190.531 miles)
- Weather: Sunny; 22–24 °C (72–75 °F) air temperature 41–48 °C (106–118 °F) track temperature 3.2 m/s (10 ft/s) wind from the east
- Attendance: 186,000 (Weekend) 73,000 (Race Day)

Pole position
Driver	(United Kingdom) Lewis Hamilton	Mercedes
- Time: 1:22.020

Fastest lap
Driver	(Australia) Daniel Ricciardo	Red Bull Racing-Renault
- Time: 1:24.821 on lap 68

Podium
First	(Germany) Sebastian Vettel	Ferrari
Second	(Russia) Daniil Kvyat	Red Bull Racing-Renault
Third	(Australia) Daniel Ricciardo	Red Bull Racing-Renault

The 2015 Hungarian Grand Prix (formally the Formula 1 Pirelli Magyar Nagydíj 2015) was a Formula One motor race that took place on 26 July 2015 at the Hungaroring in Mogyoród, Hungary. It was the tenth round of the 2015 Formula One season the final race before the summer break and the 31st Hungarian Grand Prix, and the 30th time it had been held as a round of the World Championship.

Daniel Ricciardo of Red Bull was the defending race winner, while Lewis Hamilton of Mercedes came into the race with a 17-point lead over teammate Nico Rosberg. During Saturday's qualifying, Hamilton took his ninth pole position of the season in only the tenth race, ahead of Rosberg.

At the start of the race the two Ferrari drivers Sebastian Vettel and Kimi Räikkönen took first and second respectively from the Mercedes; the first win for Ferrari in Hungary since 2004. An eventful race saw a safety car period and several mistakes from both Mercedes drivers, leading to Hamilton and Rosberg finishing sixth and eighth, while the two Red Bull drivers scored the team's first podium positions of the season. As a result, Hamilton extended his lead over Rosberg to 21 points, while Vettel moved closer to the pair, another 21 points behind Rosberg. This was the first race without a Mercedes driver on the podium since the 2013 Brazilian Grand Prix.

== Report ==
=== Background ===
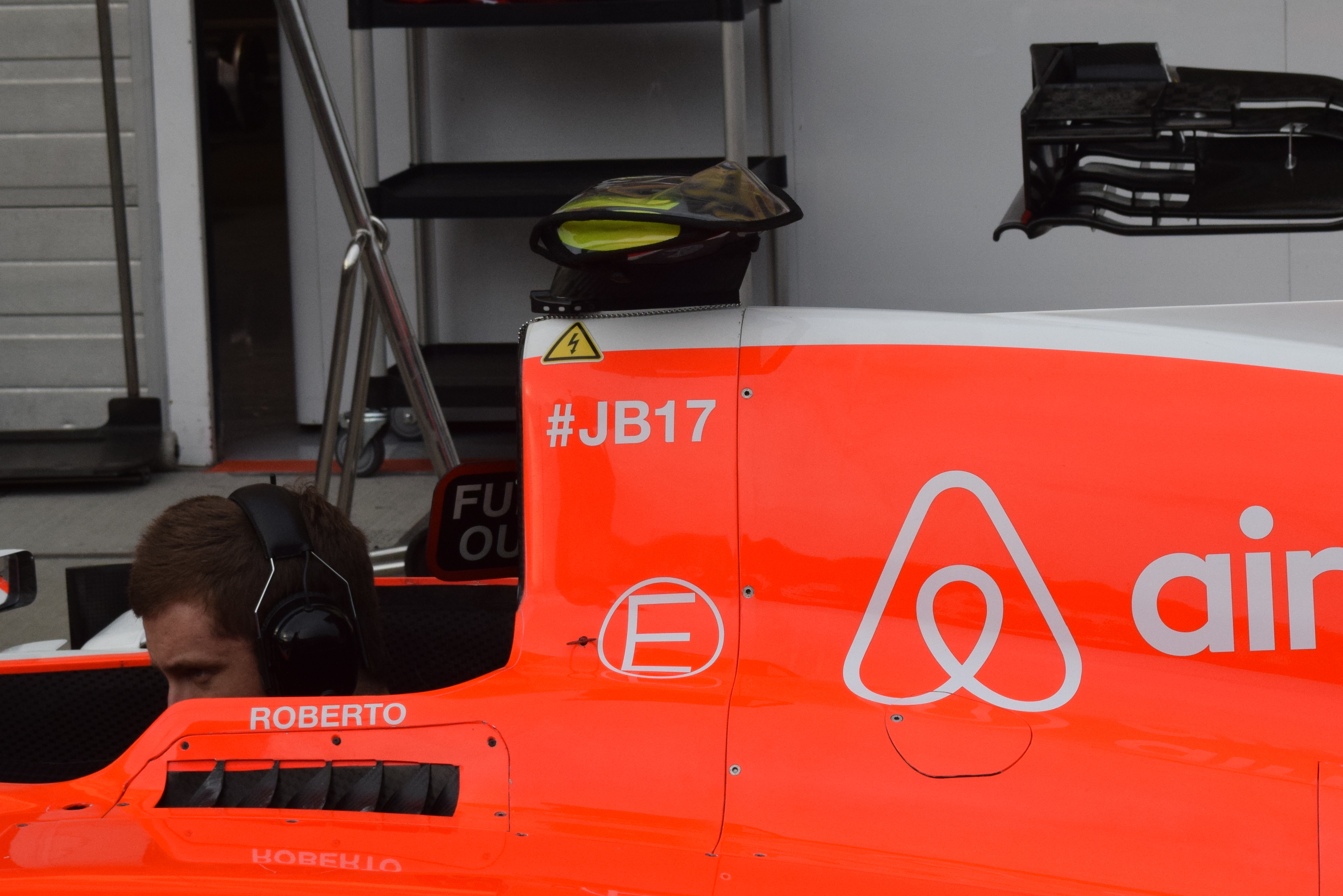
The hashtag #JB17, commemorating Jules Bianchi, on the airbox of Roberto Merhi's Marussia

The Hungarian Grand Prix marked the first Formula One race after the passing of former Marussia driver Jules Bianchi on 17 July 2015, who had crashed at the 2014 Japanese Grand Prix and remained in a coma for nine months. Drivers and teams paid tribute to Bianchi, many of them in the form of messages written on helmets and cars. A minute of silence was held before the race start on Sunday in commemoration of Bianchi. The drivers, and members of the Bianchi family (parents and siblings), linked in a chain arm in arm, with their helmets surrounding Jules' in the middle.

Tyre supplier Pirelli opted to bring the yellow-marked soft and white-marked medium tyres to the Hungaroring, the same choice as the year before. Minor changes were made to the track, renewing catch fences and tyre barriers, while removing the higher curb at the apex of turn 6 in order to prevent the cars from lifting off the ground. Generally, the track is considered to be one of the slowest in the calendar, with the fourteen corners and few straights making it hard to overtake.

Going into the weekend, Lewis Hamilton was leading the drivers' championship with 194 points, 17 more than his closest rival and teammate Nico Rosberg. Third placed Sebastian Vettel was another 42 points behind, followed by Valtteri Bottas on 77 points. In the constructors' standings, Mercedes was leading on 371, followed by Ferrari with 211 points, and Williams a further 60 points behind.

=== Free practice ===
"It was a really bad accident, really unlucky [...] I went in at the wrong angle, which made the car roll over, but everything's all right. It was a bit of a strange accident, I thought I was under control but I guess the Astroturf was very dirty and that's why I went into the wall, but we have to check everything in detail."

— Sergio Pérez, speaking about his accident.

Per the regulations for the 2015 season, three practice sessions were held, two 1.5-hour sessions on Friday and another one-hour session before qualifying on Saturday. Lewis Hamilton was fastest in the first practice session on Friday morning, one-tenth of a second faster than teammate Nico Rosberg. Sebastian Vettel missed the first half-hour of practice due to electrical problems on his Ferrari SF15-T. He eventually was sixth quickest, 1.254 seconds down on Hamilton. The session was red-flagged around the hour mark, when Sergio Pérez crashed heavily in turn 11. Going into the right-hand corner, he lost the rear and spun into the barrier, breaking off his right front wheel. The wheel caused the Force India to flip over when the car bounced back to the track. After the car came to a rest upside down, Pérez was quick to inform his team that he was unharmed. Racing resumed fifteen minutes later, only to be interrupted once more when Kimi Räikkönen's front wing came off in turn 12, leaving debris on the track. Räikkönen ultimately finished the session in third place, having put in his fastest lap before the incident. Meanwhile, the Red Bull drivers finished fourth and fifth. Valtteri Bottas in the Williams, using a new front wing, finished ninth, six-tenths of a second quicker than teammate Felipe Massa. Stating satisfaction with the new part, he opted to use it for the remainder of the weekend. While Jolyon Palmer replaced Romain Grosjean during first free practice, as he had done in previous race weekends, 2013 GP2 Series champion Fabio Leimer took part in his first Formula One session, replacing Roberto Merhi at Manor.

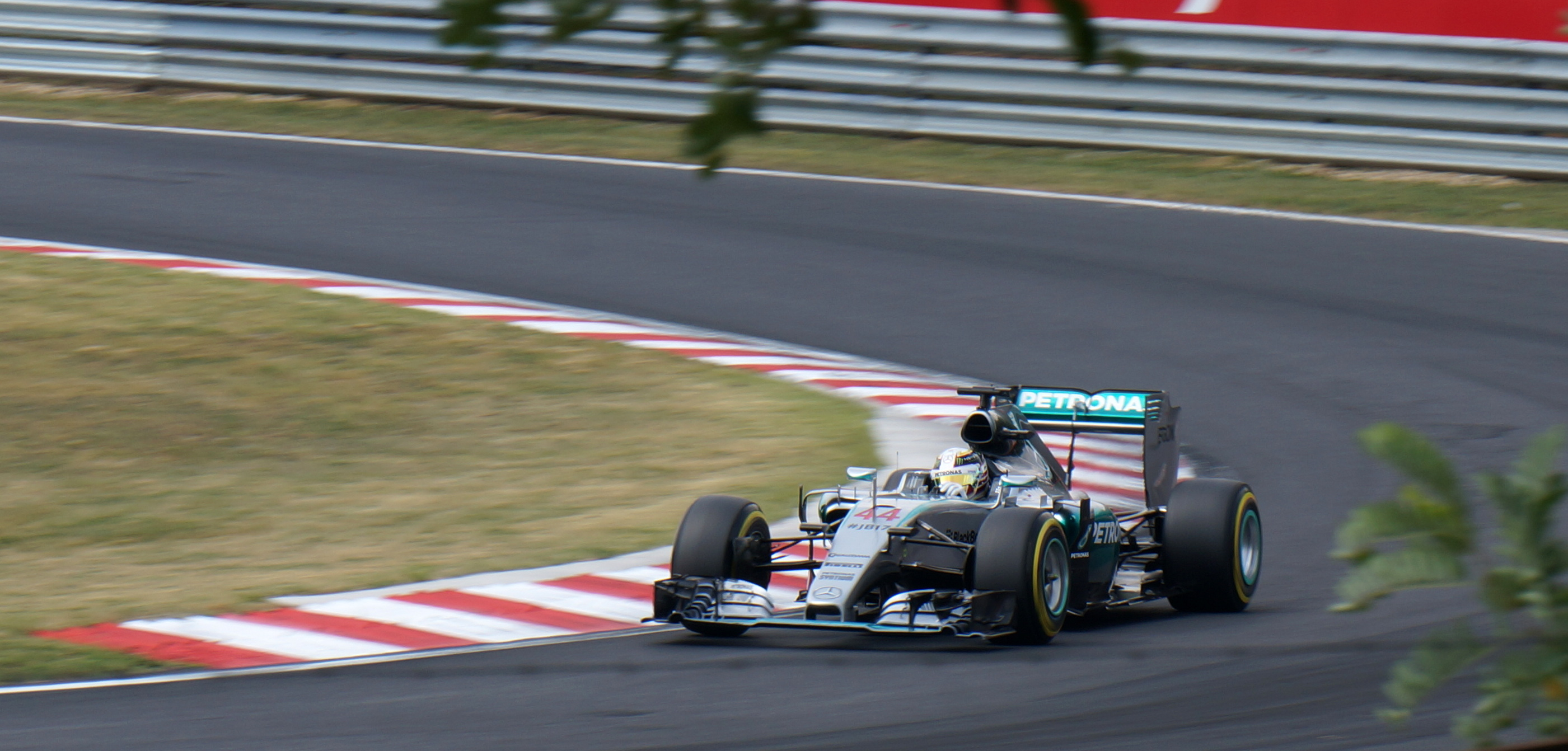
Lewis Hamilton was fastest in all three practice sessions.

Following the crash for Pérez, Force India opted not to run in the second practice session in order to have time to investigate the causes. Hamilton again topped the timesheets, this time leading the two Red Bull drivers, with Rosberg down in fourth. However, it was not a trouble-free session for Red Bull, as Daniel Ricciardo had to stop his car due to engine problems twenty minutes before the end of the session, bringing out another red flag. McLaren, which had a troublesome season so far, proved to be more competitive, with Jenson Button saying that the car "felt good" and that he hoped to qualify the car in the top ten. His teammate Fernando Alonso finished the second practice session eighth fastest, while Button himself was twelfth.

After making modifications to their suspension, Force India was cleared by the stewards to take part in the third and last practice session on Saturday morning. Lewis Hamilton was once again quickest, but this time with teammate Nico Rosberg less than a tenth of a second behind him in second place. Sebastian Vettel in third was the only other driver to come within a second of Hamilton's time. While Daniil Kvyat was next-fastest in fourth, McLaren confirmed their improved pace by finishing the session eighth and thirteenth. The second Ferrari of Räikkönen was confined to sixteenth place, after a water leak on his car prevented him from doing fast laps on the softer tyre compound.

=== Qualifying ===
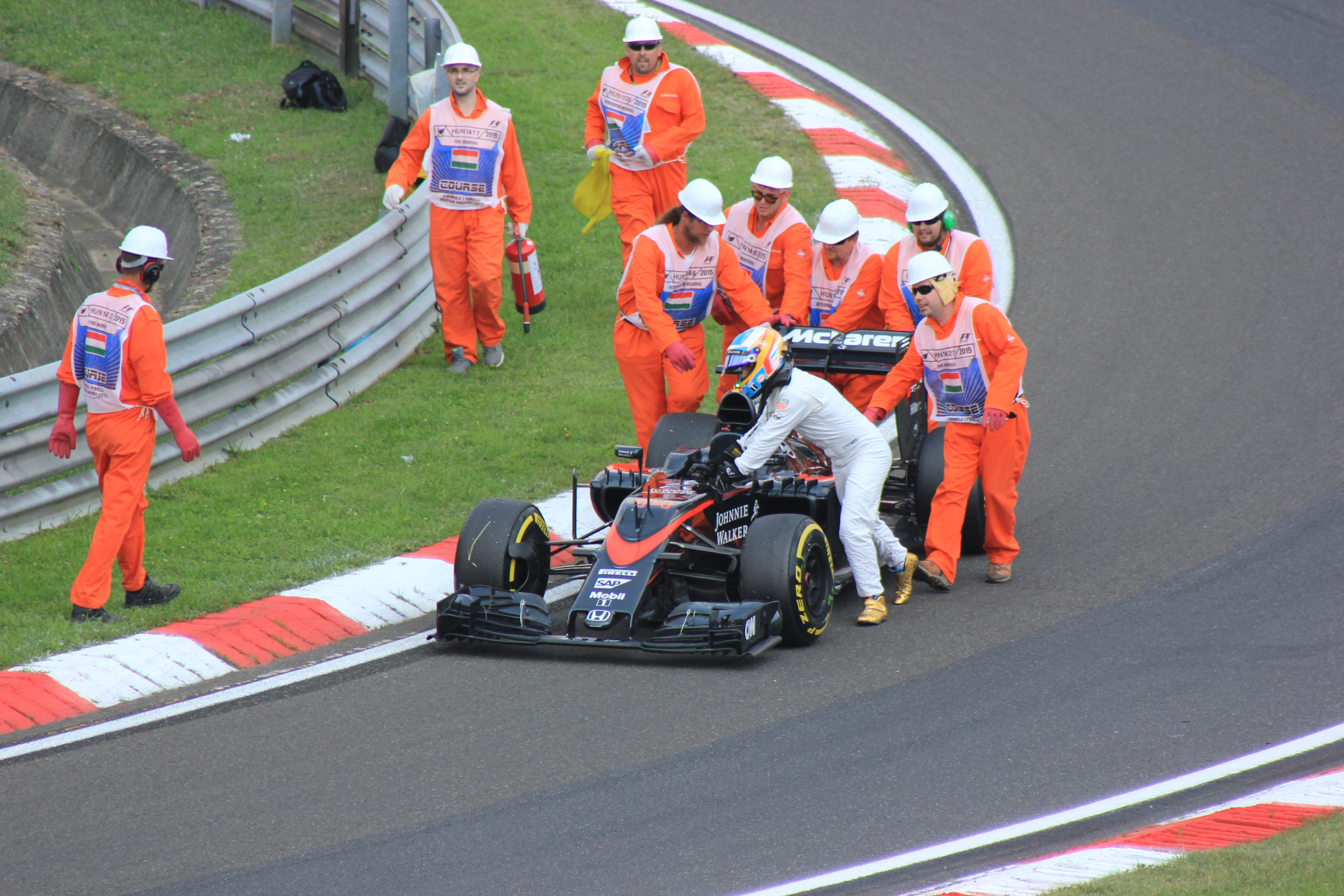
I was not allowed to compete again after the car doesn't arrive by itself into the garage, so when I knew the rules I thought: 'Why did I push so hard?', Fernando Alonso on pushing his car back into pit lane.

Qualifying consisted of three parts, 18, 15 and 12 minutes in length respectively, with five drivers eliminated from competing after each of the first two sessions. Despite hopes for a top ten starting position, Jenson Button was eliminated during the first part of qualifying (Q1), along with both Sauber and Manor drivers. The only driver to risk not using the soft tyre compound, which provided up to two seconds advantage, was Daniel Ricciardo, who finished the first part twelfth.

Fernando Alonso, the only McLaren to have made it into Q2, stopped on track due to his engine shutting down close to pit entry, bringing out a red flag. He pushed the car back into the pit garage, aided by numerous track marshals, only to be disallowed to drive out again due to regulations. Nico Rosberg, who complained about the handling of his car all through qualifying, was about half a second off his teammate's pace in Q2 in second position. Meanwhile, Pastor Maldonado and Carlos Sainz Jr. joined Alonso on the sidelines as they were eliminated, as were both Force India drivers.

The top ten competed for pole position in the final part of qualifying. Lewis Hamilton continued his impressive performance by setting what he considered "probably the most dominant" pole of his career, having led every practice and qualifying session. Daniel Ricciardo produced a clean lap to qualify between the two Ferrari cars in fourth place, behind Sebastian Vettel. Behind them, Bottas edged out Daniil Kvyat for sixth, while the second Williams of Felipe Massa qualified eighth on the grid.

Hamilton was delighted with his performance, saying: "I'm incredibly happy with the weekend [...] I can't remember having a performance as good as this." His teammate Rosberg however lamented his poor performance. While he beat Hamilton on number of pole positions the previous year, he now trailed him by 0.262 seconds on average in qualifying, prompting him to say: "It is not explainable to me. [...] I don't understand why there is such a big difference to last year."

=== Race ===
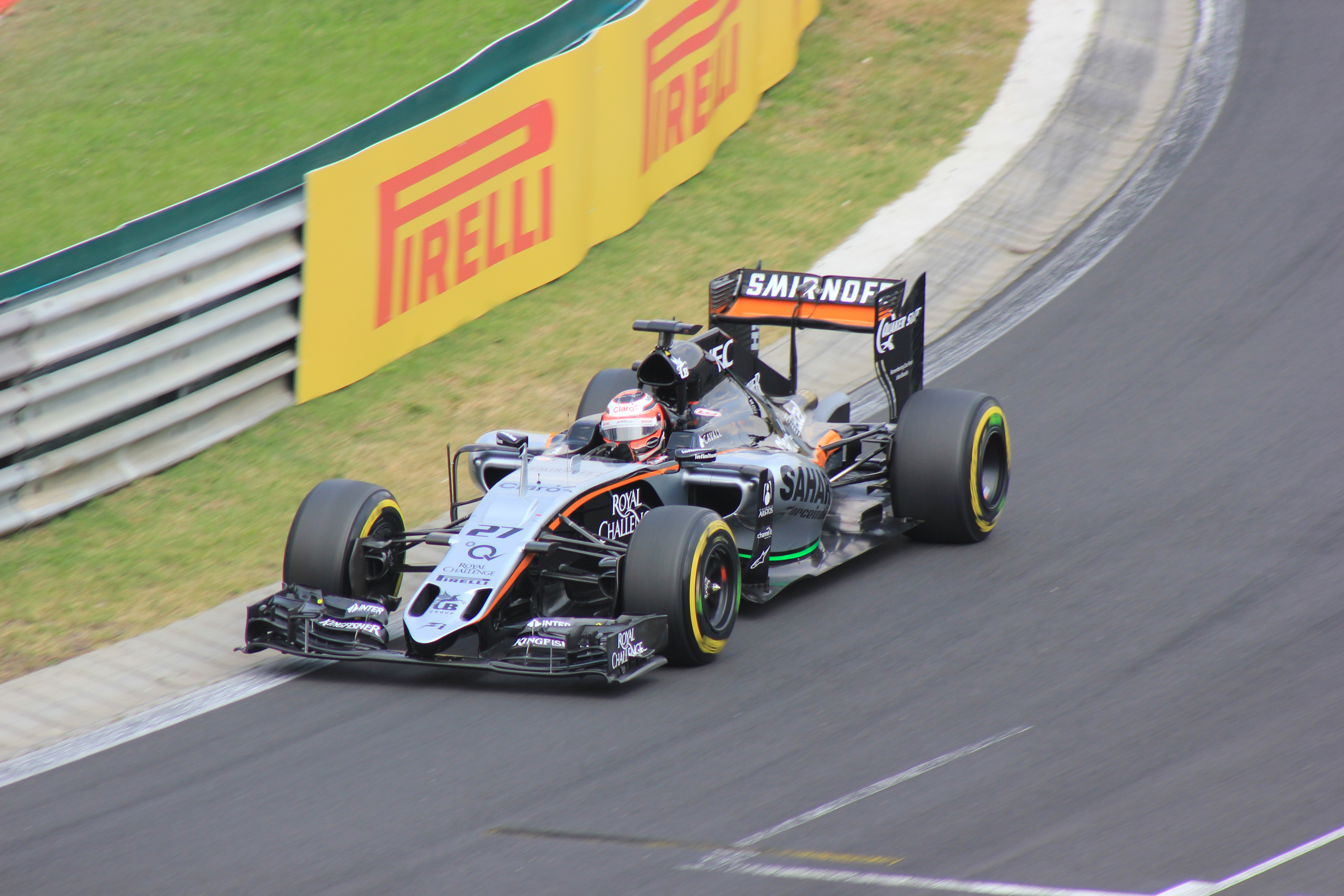
Nico Hülkenberg retired from the race on lap 43.

Felipe Massa lined up incorrectly on the grid, causing the start to be aborted and another formation lap to commence. One lap was removed from the race distance and Massa was handed a five-second penalty.

At the start, Sebastian Vettel and Kimi Räikkönen gained the lead off the two Mercedes drivers, taking advantage of the slower starts from Nico Rosberg and Lewis Hamilton. Hamilton ran wide and cut the chicane at turn six and dropped to tenth place. Further back, Nico Hülkenberg made up six places in the opening corners, jumping from eleventh to fifth, while Bottas and Ricciardo touched at the start, sending Ricciardo back to seventh while Bottas led Hülkenberg in fourth place. During the opening laps, Felipe Massa was able to hold Hamilton behind him, while Daniil Kvyat led his teammate Ricciardo through into sixth place on lap eight. Lap ten saw Hamilton overtake Massa for ninth, while Ricciardo edged out Hülkenberg for fifth position. Three laps later, Hamilton moved past Pérez for eighth.

Pit stops started on lap 14, when Bottas and Kvyat were the first to come in, with Massa following suit a lap later, taking his five-second penalty. By lap 18, the two Ferrari drivers in front were unchallenged by Rosberg behind. Sebastian Vettel set a new fastest lap, being 2.7 seconds in front of his teammate, who was a further seven seconds ahead of Rosberg in third. Räikkönen lost one of his front cameras on lap 19, but did not opt to change his front wing. The same lap, Pastor Maldonado and Sergio Pérez touched going into turn one, with Pérez spinning in the process but being able to continue. Maldonado however was handed a drive-through penalty for causing the collision.

When Lewis Hamilton came into the pit lane on lap 20, he emerged slightly in front of Valtteri Bottas in fifth place. Rosberg made a pit stop for new tyres one lap later, choosing the harder medium compound. The two Ferrari drivers and Daniel Ricciardo followed in the subsequent lap, staying ahead of Rosberg and Hamilton respectively. Meanwhile, Romain Grosjean became the second Lotus driver to be penalised, receiving a five-second penalty for an unsafe release from his pit box. Hamilton was behind Ricciardo in fifth place at this point, who was running the harder compound tyres, eventually passing him on lap 29. By lap 33, Vettel in front was leading teammate Räikkönen by seven seconds, with Rosberg a further twenty seconds adrift. Meanwhile, Hamilton started to gain on his teammate, setting fastest laps to trail him by eight seconds on lap 36.

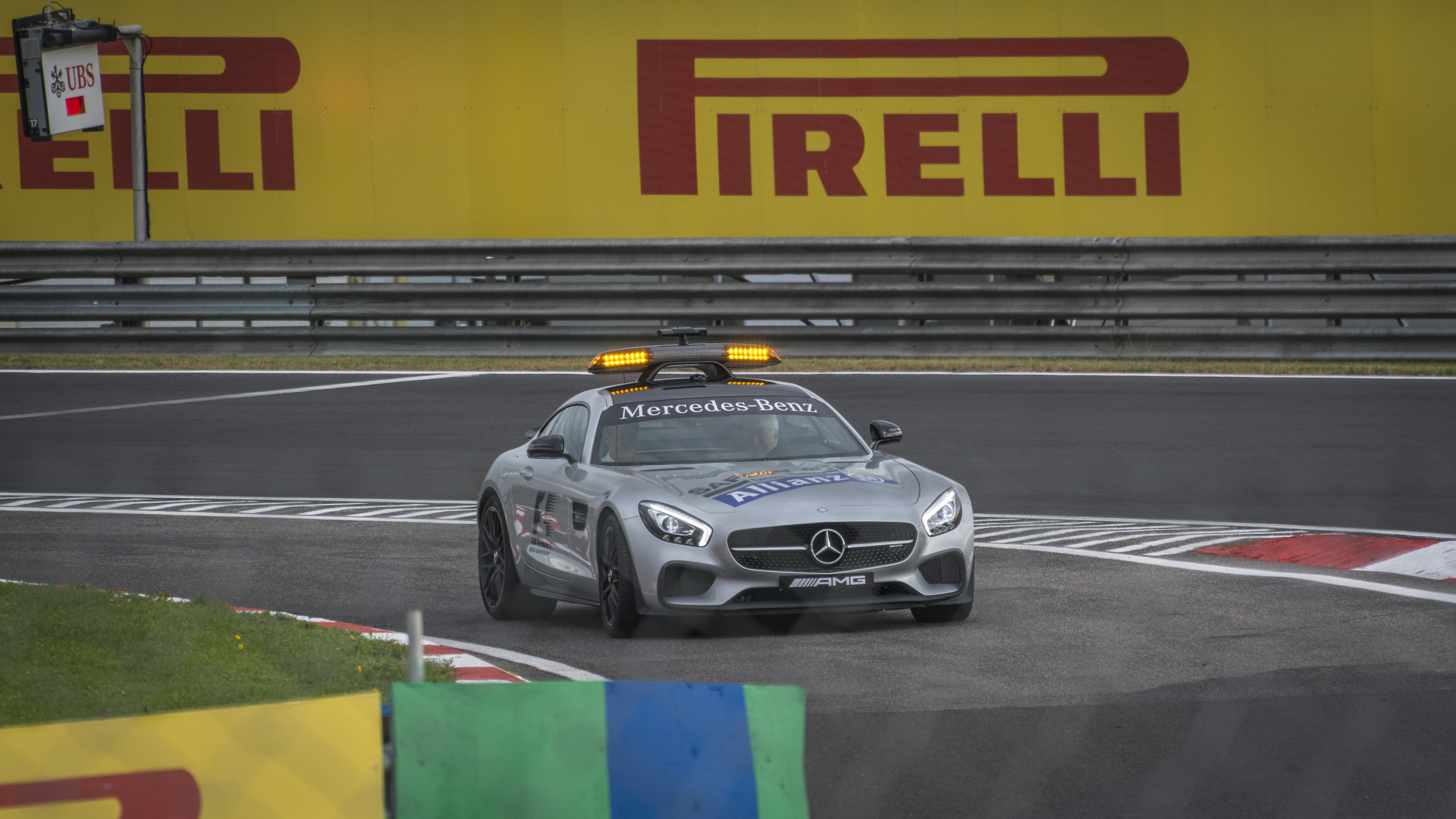
The safety car coming into the pit lane (pictured during the GP2 race)

By lap 42, Kimi Räikkönen started to experience engine problems which turned out to be an issue with his kinetic electrical unit. This led to a loss in power which allowed the lapped Fernando Alonso to overtake him and Nico Rosberg to close in as well. One lap later, Nico Hülkenberg lost his front wing without evident reason. After the race, the kerbs of the Hungaroring were blamed for the malfunction, which sent Hülkenberg into the tyre barriers in turn one. The Virtual Safety Car was deployed, leading to both Mercedes cars pitting instantly, while both Ferrari cars did the same one lap later. By that time, the actual safety car was sent out on track to lead the field through the pit lane while marshals cleaned up pieces of Hülkenberg's front wing that littered the front straight, leading the field until the end of lap 49.

At the restart, Lewis Hamilton came under pressure from Daniel Ricciardo and both cars touched and took damage in turn one, handing Ricciardo the position. Hamilton was given a drive-through penalty for his actions. Meanwhile, Rosberg easily took second place from the troubled Räikkönen, who lost one more spot to Ricciardo just shortly after. Further back, Max Verstappen ran into the back of Bottas, causing Bottas to lose ground while Verstappen moved up to seventh. Nico Rosberg started to gain time on Sebastian Vettel in front, trailing him by 1.2 seconds with 18 laps to go. Kimi Räikkönen went into the pit lane on lap 53 and reset his engine, only to retire for good on lap 57. Sainz joined him three laps later with a fuel pressure issue. Pastor Maldonado was handed two more penalties in the following laps, for speeding in the pit lane and for overtaking behind the safety car. Max Verstappen was also reprimanded with a drive-through penalty for failing "to stay above the required time set by the FIA ECU during the deployment of the safety car".

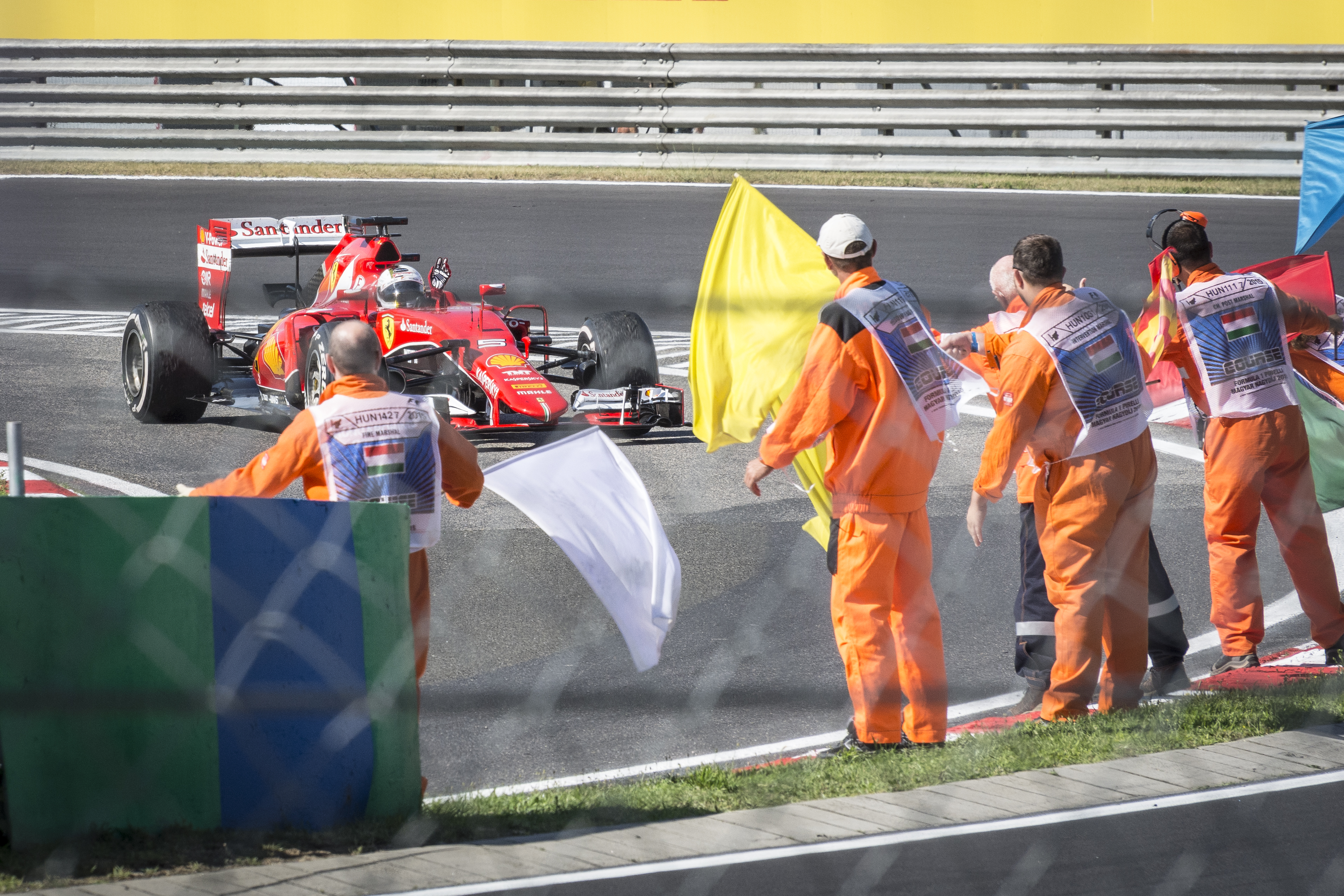
Sebastian Vettel celebrating his victory

By lap 63, three drivers were contending for the race victory. Sebastian Vettel was leading compatriot Rosberg by 0.8 seconds with Daniel Ricciardo another 0.7 seconds behind. Meanwhile, Hamilton made up ground and overtook Ericsson and Button to move into eighth place. When Ricciardo tried to overtake Rosberg one lap later, the two collided, clipping the Red Bull's front wing and giving Rosberg a puncture. Both headed to the pit lane, with Ricciardo emerging third, while Rosberg fell back behind Hamilton. Even though Daniil Kvyat was handed a ten-second time penalty for leaving track limits, he held on to second place for his first Formula One podium finish. Lewis Hamilton went past Romain Grosjean for sixth place on lap 67, closing on Fernando Alonso, but was eventually unable to catch him, who scored McLaren's best finish of the season up to that point. The race was also Honda's 350th Grand Prix as an engine supplier and the first time that the renewed partnership with McLaren scored a double points finish.

By winning his first Hungarian Grand Prix, and 41st Grand Prix overall, Vettel matched Ayrton Senna for third-most Formula One career wins. It was Ferrari's first win at the track since Michael Schumacher won in 2004. It was the first time since the 2013 Brazilian Grand Prix that any of the factory Mercedes cars failed to finish on the podium.

=== Post-race ===
Sebastian Vettel dedicated his victory to Jules Bianchi, saying over the team radio on his way back to the pit lane: "Merci Jules, you will always be in our hearts and we know that sooner or later you would have been part of this team!" During the podium interviews, conducted by German TV presenter Kai Ebel, he went on to say: "Incredible day but this victory is for Jules. We know that it has been an incredibly tough week and it's, I think, for all of us very, very difficult, so this one is for him [...]." Daniil Kvyat stated that the team deserved the podium finish after "a very tough year". Daniel Ricciardo described it as "a crazy race", but said that "that's the way Jules would have wanted it".

"You know some people say "never give up" but they don't know what they're saying and until today I didn't also know what it means really, but today I really learned what it means to never give up because it can always come your way."

— Daniil Kvyat, speaking about his race.

Media reactions to the race were very positive, with The Guardian calling it "heart-stopper of a race", while the BBC spoke of a "classic" race. Lewis Hamilton apologised for "a really bad performance from me". He continued: "I don't know if it was a lack of concentration or what. I pushed right to the end but there were so many obstacles. It's like there were two different directions and each time I chose the wrong one." Fernando Alonso hailed his fifth-place finish as "unbelievable", but stressed that the result was "a present", stating: "at the moment we are not super-competitive".

Several drivers received penalty points on their Super Licences, including Hamilton, who was given his first two for his collision with Ricciardo at the safety car restart. Romain Grosjean added two points to get to six over the course of the season for the unsafe release. His teammate Pastor Maldonado was handed two points as well for his accident with Pérez, bringing him to six over a course of two months. Concerning the incident between Rosberg and Ricciardo, no further action was taken. The stewards came to the same verdict concerning the Verstappen–Bottas incident, saying that Verstappen "took reasonable actions to avoid contact", however he did receive three penalty points, bringing his total to five, for speeding behind the safety car.

== Classification ==
=== Qualifying ===
Pos.	Car no.	Driver	Constructor	Qualifying times			Final grid
Pos.	Car no.	Driver	Constructor	Q1	Q2	Q3	Final grid
1	44	(United Kingdom) Lewis Hamilton	Mercedes	1:22.890	1:22.285	1:22.020	1
2	6	(Germany) Nico Rosberg	Mercedes	1:22.979	1:22.775	1:22.595	2
3	5	(Germany) Sebastian Vettel	Ferrari	1:23.312	1:23.168	1:22.739	3
4	3	(Australia) Daniel Ricciardo	Red Bull Racing-Renault	1:24.408	1:23.230	1:22.774	4
5	7	(Finland) Kimi Räikkönen	Ferrari	1:23.596	1:23.460	1:23.020	5
6	77	(Finland) Valtteri Bottas	Williams-Mercedes	1:23.649	1:23.555	1:23.222	6
7	26	(Russia) Daniil Kvyat	Red Bull Racing-Renault	1:23.587	1:23.597	1:23.332	7
8	19	(Brazil) Felipe Massa	Williams-Mercedes	1:23.895	1:23.598	1:23.537	8
9	33	(Netherlands) Max Verstappen	Toro Rosso-Renault	1:24.032	1:23.781	1:23.679	9
10	8	(France) Romain Grosjean	Lotus-Mercedes	1:24.242	1:23.805	1:24.181	10
11	27	(Germany) Nico Hülkenberg	Force India-Mercedes	1:24.115	1:23.826		11
12	55	(Spain) Carlos Sainz Jr.	Toro Rosso-Renault	1:24.623	1:23.869		12
13	11	(Mexico) Sergio Pérez	Force India-Mercedes	1:24.444	1:24.461		13
14	13	(Venezuela) Pastor Maldonado	Lotus-Mercedes	1:23.895	1:24.609		14
15	14	(Spain) Fernando Alonso	McLaren-Honda	1:24.563	No time		15
16	22	(United Kingdom) Jenson Button	McLaren-Honda	1:24.739			16
17	9	(Sweden) Marcus Ericsson	Sauber-Ferrari	1:24.843			17
18	12	(Brazil) Felipe Nasr	Sauber-Ferrari	1:24.997			18
19	98	(Spain) Roberto Merhi	Marussia-Ferrari	1:27.416			19
20	28	(United Kingdom) Will Stevens	Marussia-Ferrari	1:27.949			20
107% time: 1:28.692

=== Race ===
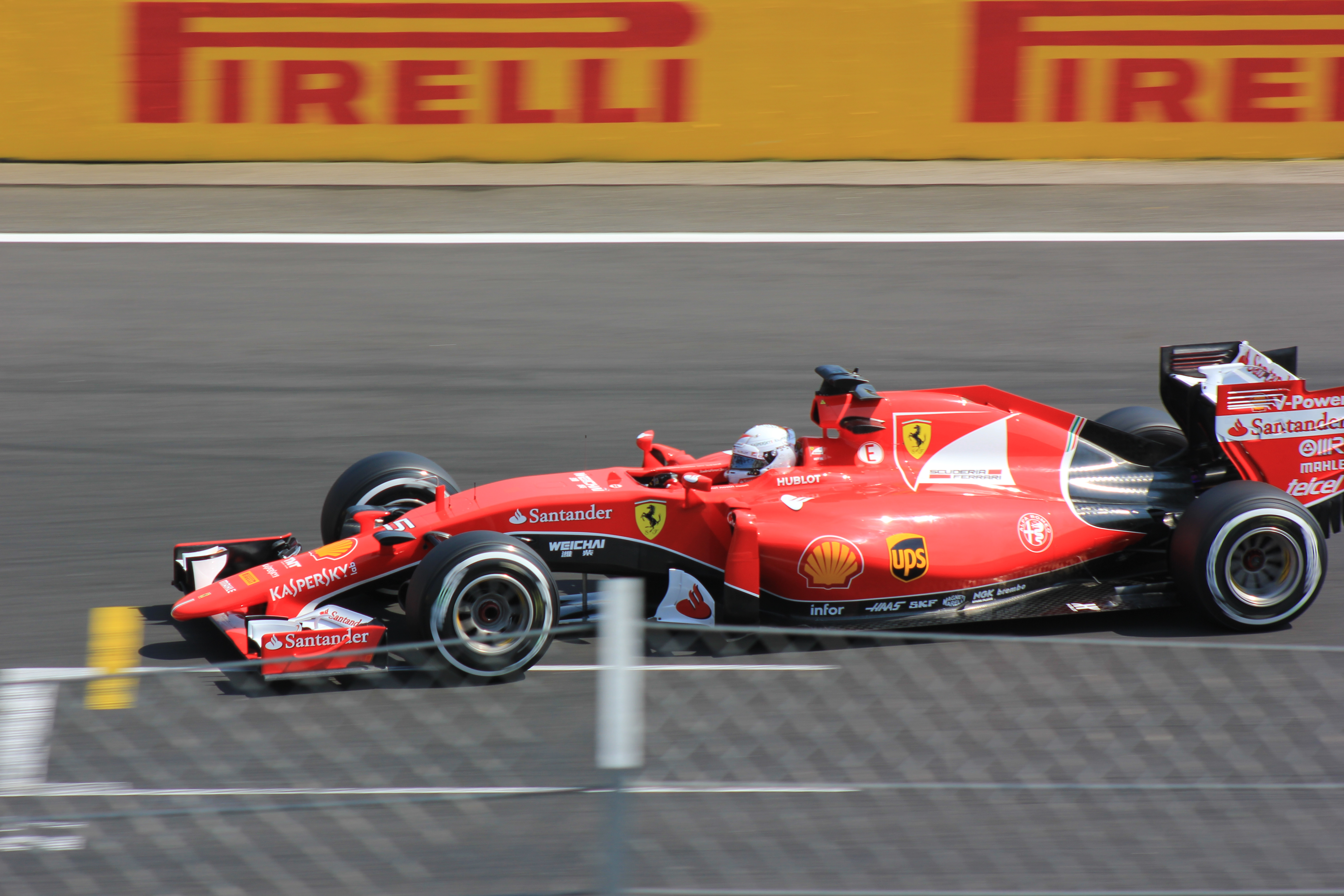
Sebastian Vettel won his second race of the season.

Pos.	No.	Driver	Constructor	Laps	Time/Retired	Grid	Points
1	5	(Germany) Sebastian Vettel	Ferrari	69	1:46:09.985	3	25
2	26	(Russia) Daniil Kvyat	Red Bull Racing-Renault	69	+15.748^{2}	7	18
3	3	(Australia) Daniel Ricciardo	Red Bull Racing-Renault	69	+25.084	4	15
4	33	(Netherlands) Max Verstappen	Toro Rosso-Renault	69	+44.251	9	12
5	14	(Spain) Fernando Alonso	McLaren-Honda	69	+49.079	15	10
6	44	(United Kingdom) Lewis Hamilton	Mercedes	69	+52.025	1	8
7	8	(France) Romain Grosjean	Lotus-Mercedes	69	+58.578	10	6
8	6	(Germany) Nico Rosberg	Mercedes	69	+58.876	2	4
9	22	(United Kingdom) Jenson Button	McLaren-Honda	69	+1:07.028	16	2
10	9	(Sweden) Marcus Ericsson	Sauber-Ferrari	69	+1:09.130	17	1
11	12	(Brazil) Felipe Nasr	Sauber-Ferrari	69	+1:13.458	18	
12	19	(Brazil) Felipe Massa	Williams-Mercedes	69	+1:14.278	8	
13	77	(Finland) Valtteri Bottas	Williams-Mercedes	69	+1:20.228	6	
14	13	(Venezuela) Pastor Maldonado	Lotus-Mercedes	69	+1:25.142	14	
15	98	(Spain) Roberto Merhi	Marussia-Ferrari	67	+2 Laps	19	
16^{1}	28	(United Kingdom) Will Stevens	Marussia-Ferrari	65	Suspension	20	
Ret	55	(Spain) Carlos Sainz Jr.	Toro Rosso-Renault	60	Fuel pressure	12	
Ret	7	(Finland) Kimi Räikkönen	Ferrari	55	Hybrid system	5	
Ret	11	(Mexico) Sergio Pérez	Force India-Mercedes	53	Brakes	13	
Ret	27	(Germany) Nico Hülkenberg	Force India-Mercedes	41	Front wing/Accident	11	

Notes

- ^1 – Will Stevens was classified because he completed over 90% of the race distance.
- ^2 – Daniil Kvyat had ten seconds added to his time for exceeding track limits.

== Championship standings after the race ==
Drivers' Championship standings

Pos.	Driver	Points
1	(United Kingdom) Lewis Hamilton	202
2	(Germany) Nico Rosberg	181
3	(Germany) Sebastian Vettel	160
4	(Finland) Valtteri Bottas	77
5	(Finland) Kimi Räikkönen	76

Constructors' Championship standings

Pos.	Constructor	Points
1	(Germany) Mercedes	383
2	(Italy) Ferrari	236
3	(United Kingdom) Williams-Mercedes	151
4	(Austria) Red Bull Racing-Renault	96
5	Force India-Mercedes	39

- Note: Only the top five positions are included for both sets of standings.

== See also ==
- 2015 Hungaroring GP2 Series round
- 2015 Hungaroring GP3 Series round

Previous race: 2015 British Grand Prix	FIA Formula One World Championship; 2015 season	Next race: 2015 Belgian Grand Prix
Previous race: 2014 Hungarian Grand Prix	Hungarian Grand Prix	Next race: 2016 Hungarian Grand Prix
