= 1936 Hungarian Grand Prix =

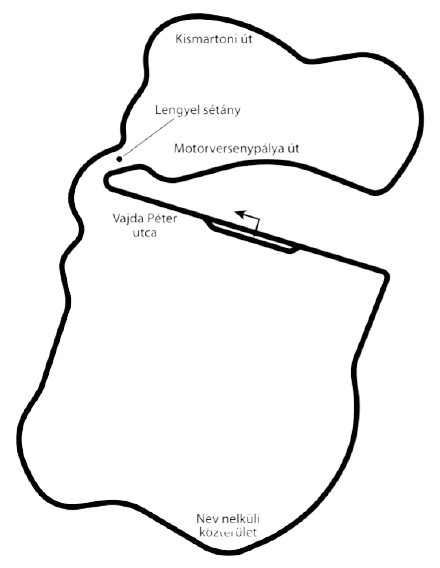

Race details
- Date: 21 June 1936
- Official name: I. Magyar Nagydíj
- Location: Népliget Park; Budapest, Hungary
- Course: Street circuit
- Course length: 5.0 km (3.1 miles)
- Distance: 50 laps, 250 km (155 miles)

Pole position
Driver	(Germany) Bernd Rosemeyer	Auto Union
- Time: 2:38.15

Fastest lap
Driver	(Italy) Tazio Nuvolari	Alfa Romeo
- Time: 2:35.68

Podium
First	(Italy) Tazio Nuvolari	Alfa Romeo
Second	(Germany) Bernd Rosemeyer	Auto Union
Third	(Italy) Achille Varzi	Auto Union

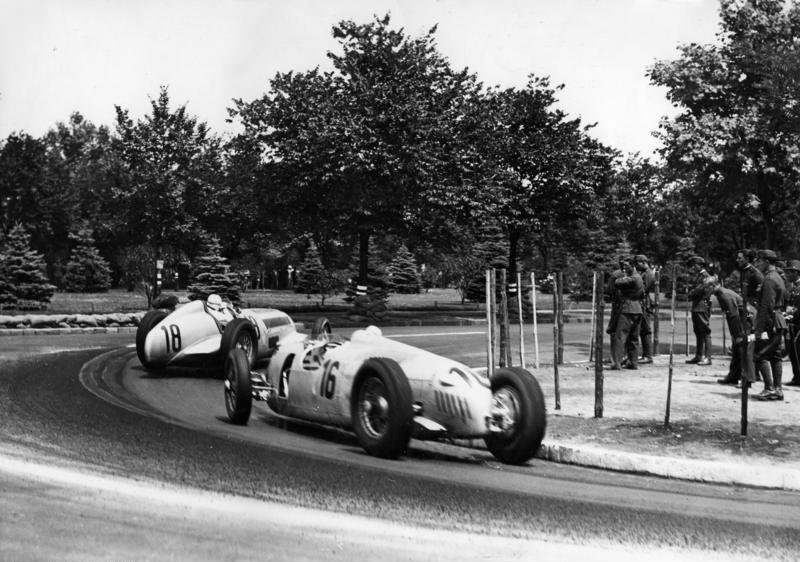
Caracciola and Rosemeyer in the 1936 Hungarian Grand Prix.

The 1936 Hungarian Grand Prix was a Grand Prix motor race held on 21 June 1936 at Népliget Park in Budapest.

== Entries ==
No	Driver	Entrant	Constructor	Car
2	(United Kingdom) Eileen Ellison	Thomas Pitt Cholmondeley-Tapper	Maserati	
4	(United Kingdom) Austin Dobson	Private	Alfa Romeo	P3
6	(United Kingdom) Charlie Martin	Private	Alfa Romeo	P3
8	(France) "Raph"	Private	Maserati	
10	(Hungary) László Hartmann	Private	Maserati	
12	(Germany) Hans Stuck	Auto Union	Auto Union	C
14	(Italy) Achille Varzi	Auto Union	Auto Union	C
16	(Germany) Bernd Rosemeyer	Auto Union	Auto Union	C
18	(Germany) Rudolf Caracciola	Daimler-Benz AG	Mercedes-Benz	W25K
20	(Monaco) Louis Chiron	Daimler-Benz AG	Mercedes-Benz	W25K
22	(Germany) Manfred von Brauchitsch	Daimler-Benz AG	Mercedes-Benz	W25K
24	(Italy) Tazio Nuvolari	Scuderia Ferrari	Alfa Romeo	8C-35
26	(Italy) Antonio Brivio	Scuderia Ferrari	Alfa Romeo	8C-35
28	(Italy) Mario Tadini	Scuderia Ferrari	Alfa Romeo	8C-35
30	(Romania) Petre Cristea	Private	Ford	V9 special
32	(Spain) José Maria de Villapadierna	Private	Alfa Romeo	P3
	(Germany) Ernst von Delius	Auto Union	(reserve)	

== Classification ==
Pos	No	Driver	Constructor	Laps	Time/Retired	Grid
1	24	(Italy) Tazio Nuvolari	Alfa Romeo	50	2:14:03.5	4
2	16	(Germany) Bernd Rosemeyer	Auto Union	50	+14.2	1
3	14	(Italy) Achille Varzi	Auto Union	48	+2 Laps	6
4	28	(Italy) Mario Tadini	Alfa Romeo	47	+3 Laps	7
5	12	(Germany) Hans Stuck (Germany) Ernst von Delius	Auto Union	46	+4 Laps	2
6	4	(United Kingdom) Austin Dobson	Alfa Romeo	45	+5 Laps	9
7	10	(Hungary) László Hartmann	Maserati	44	+6 Laps	10 †
Ret	22	(Germany) Manfred von Brauchitsch	Mercedes-Benz	40	Accident	3
Ret	6	(United Kingdom) Charlie Martin	Alfa Romeo	32/35	Rear axle	11 †
Ret	18	(Germany) Rudolf Caracciola	Mercedes-Benz	26	Engine	5
Ret	20	(Monaco) Louis Chiron	Mercedes-Benz	19	Engine/Supercharger	8
DNS	2	(United Kingdom) Eileen Ellison	Maserati			
DNS	8	(France) "Raph"	Maserati			
DNS	30	(Romania) Petre Cristea	Ford V9			
DNS	32	(Spain) José Maria de Villapadierna	Alfa Romeo			

† Martin and Hartmann swapped grid positions for tactical reasons.

=== Starting grid positions ===
1st Row	2 Pos.	1 Pos.
	(Germany); Stuck; Auto Union; 2:39.83	(Germany); Rosemeyer; Auto Union; 2:38.15
2nd Row	2 Pos.	1 Pos.
	(Italy); Nuvolari; Alfa Romeo; 2:40.08	(Germany) von Brauchitsch; Mercedes-Benz; 2:39.87
3rd Row	2 Pos.	1 Pos.
	(Italy); Varzi; Auto Union; 2:43.12	(Germany); Caracciola; Mercedes-Benz; 2:40.38
4th Row	2 Pos.	1 Pos.
	(Monaco); Chiron; Mercedes-Benz; 2:49.65	(Italy); Tadini; Alfa Romeo; 2:47.52
5th Row	2 Pos.	1 Pos.
	(Hungary); Hartmann; Maserati; 3:10.56 †	(United Kingdom); Dobson; Alfa Romeo; 2:53.21
6th Row		1 Pos.
		(United Kingdom); Martin; Alfa Romeo; 3:02.51 †

† Martin and Hartmann swapped grid positions for tactical reasons.

Grand Prix Race
1936 Grand Prix season
Previous race: None	Hungarian Grand Prix	Next race: 1986 Hungarian Grand Prix
