= People's Park (Budapest) =

Public park in Budapest, Hungary

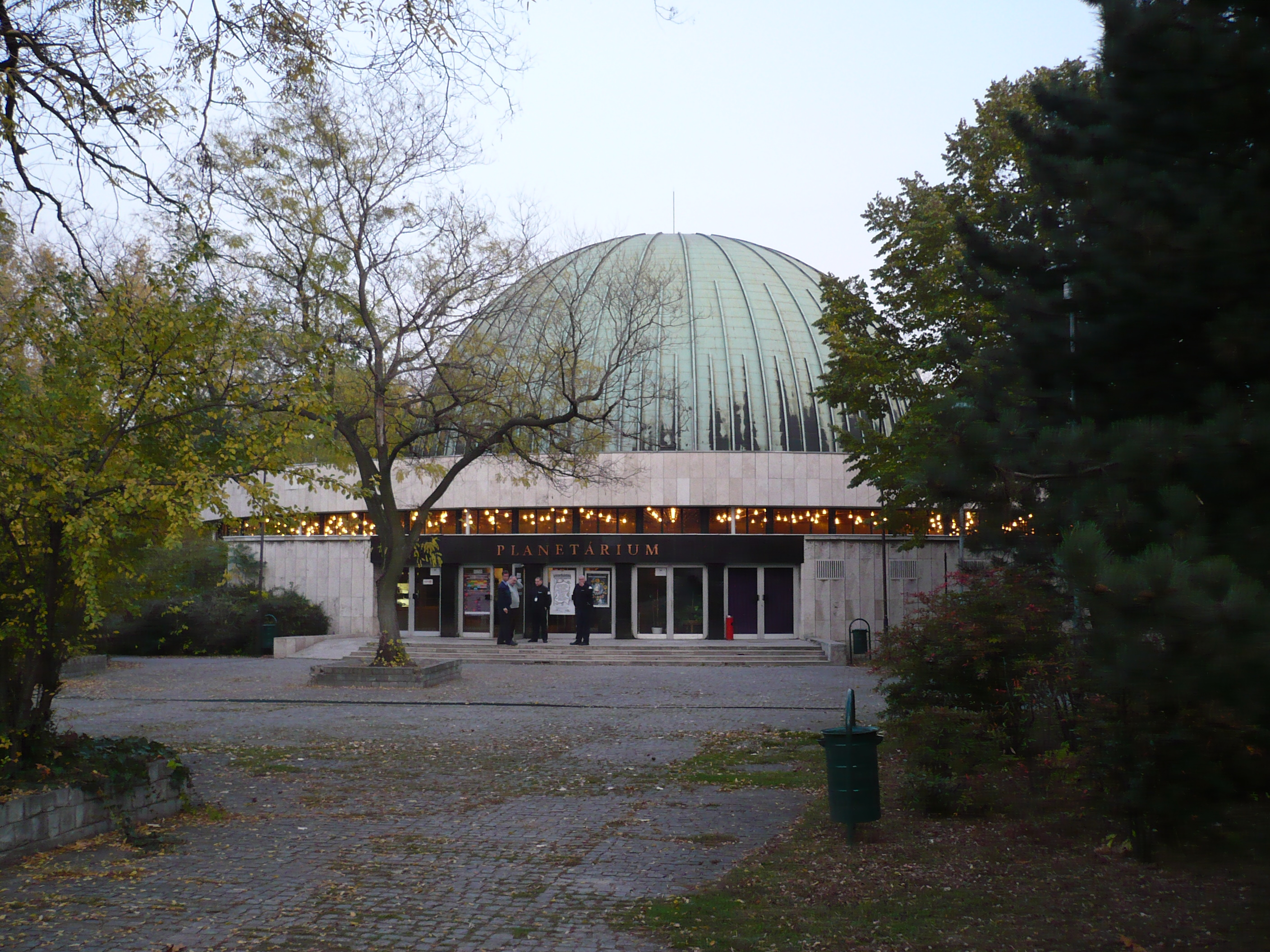
The Planetarium

Népliget or People's Park is the biggest public park in Budapest, Hungary. It is located southeast of the city centre, and covers an area of 110 hectares (270 acres). It was established to commemorate the 100th anniversary of the union of Pest, Buda and Óbuda. The park is the site of the Planetarium, which is a laser theatre, and the E-klub, the biggest night club in Budapest.

== Circuit ==
Népliget Park
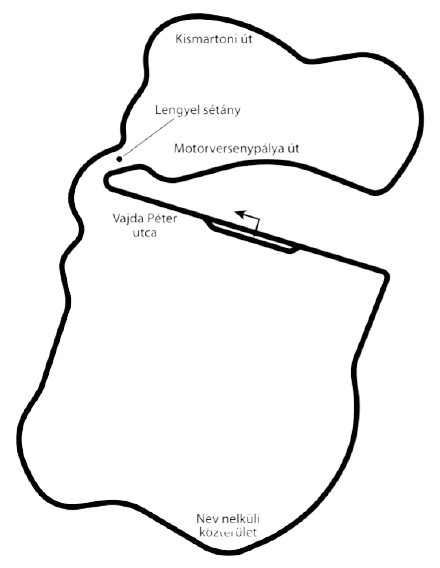
- Original Circuit (1936)
- Location: Budapest, Hungary
- Coordinates: 47°28′41″N 19°6′25″E
- Opened: 1936
- Closed: 1972
- Major events: European Touring Car Championship (1963–1964, 1966–1967, 1969–1970); Grand Prix motor racing Hungarian Grand Prix (1936)

Full Circuit (1937–1972)
- Length: 5.294 km (3.290 mi)
- Turns: 19
- Race lap record: 2:24.500 ( (Netherlands) Toine Hezemans, Alfa Romeo GTAm, 1970, Group 2)

Original Circuit (1936)
- Length: 4.988 km (3.099 mi)
- Turns: 22
- Race lap record: 2:35.680 ( (Italy) Tazio Nuvolari, Alfa Romeo 8C–35, 1936, GP)

The park was the site of the 1936 Hungarian Grand Prix, held on roads within the park, as well as a round of the 1963 European Touring Car Challenge season. The circuit hosted European Touring Car Championship races in 1963–1964, 1966–1967, and 1969–1970. The Hungarian Grand Prix was also scheduled for 7 October 1984 but was cancelled and replaced by the European Grand Prix at the Nürburgring.

=== Lap records ===
The fastest official race lap records at the Népliget Park are listed as:

Category	Time	Driver	Vehicle	Event
Full Circuit (1937–1972): 5.294 km (3.290 mi)
Group 2	2:24.500	Toine Hezemans	Alfa Romeo GTAm	1970 Budapest ETCC round
Group 5 (Touring Cars)	2:27.100	Dieter Quester	BMW 2002 TiK	1969 Budapest ETCC round
Group 1	2:43.000	Johann Abt	Fiat Abarth 1000 TCR	1970 Budapest ETCC round
Original Circuit (1936): 4.988 km (3.099 mi)
Grand Prix motor racing	2:35.680	Tazio Nuvolari	Alfa Romeo 8C–351	1936 Hungarian Grand Prix

== Transport ==
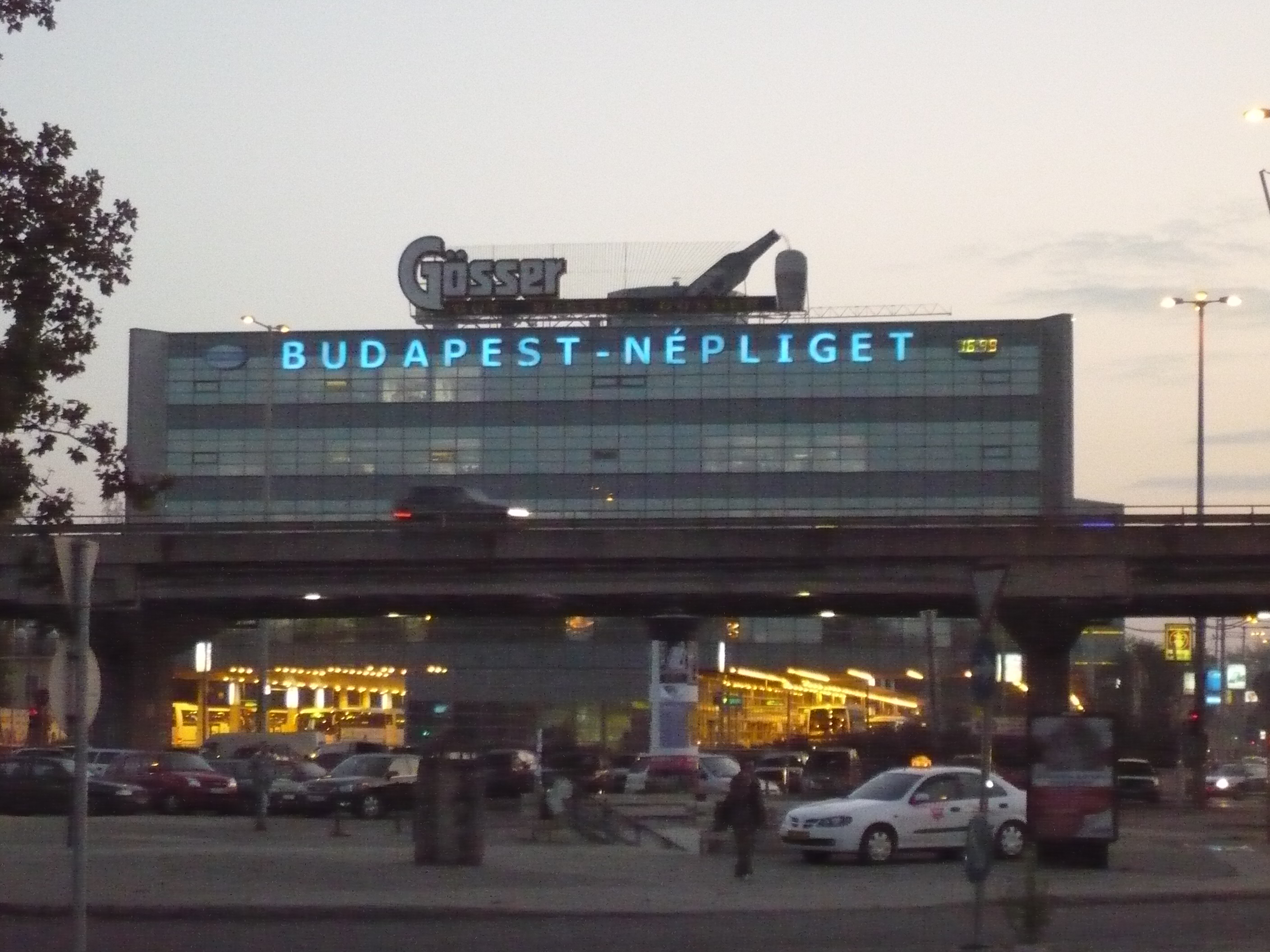
Népliget bus station

South of the park is the Népliget bus station, an international coach station. The Line 3 (North–south line) of the Budapest Metro has a stop there. The tram #1-#1A have three stops along the north-western border of the Népliget.
