= Hungarian Grand Prix =

Formula One Grand Prix

- Hungaroring

Race information
- Number of times held: 42
- First held: 1936
- Most wins (drivers): (United Kingdom) Lewis Hamilton (8)
- Most wins (constructors): (United Kingdom) McLaren (14)
- Circuit length: 4.381 km (2.722 miles)
- Race length: 306.630 km (190.531 miles)
- Laps: 70

Last race (2026)

Pole position
- (United Kingdom) Lando Norris; McLaren-Mercedes; 1:17.207

Podium
- 1. (United Kingdom) L. Norris; McLaren-Mercedes; 1:39:56.180; 2. (Netherlands) M. Verstappen; Red Bull Racing-Red Bull Ford; +15.080; 3. (Italy) K. Antonelli; Mercedes; +18.728

Fastest lap
- (Monaco) Charles Leclerc; Ferrari; 1:22.000

The Hungarian Grand Prix (Hungarian: Magyar Nagydíj, pronounced [ˈmɒɟɒr ˈnɒɟdiːj]) is a motor racing event held annually at the Hungaroring racetrack located on the northeastern outskirts of Budapest, within the village of Mogyoród. The event has been a regular fixture of the FIA Formula One World Championship since 1986, traditionally taking place between mid-July and late August.

== History ==
=== Origins ===
The first Hungarian Grand Prix was held on 21 June 1936 over a 5-kilometre (3.1-mile) track laid out in Népliget, a park in Budapest. The Mercedes-Benz, Auto Union, and the Alfa Romeo-equipped Ferrari teams all sent three cars and the event drew a very large crowd. However, politics and the ensuing war meant the end of Grand Prix motor racing in the country for fifty years.

=== Hungaroring ===
A major coup by Bernie Ecclestone, the 1986 Hungarian Grand Prix was the first Formula One race to take place behind the Iron Curtain. Held at the twisty Hungaroring in Mogyoród near Budapest, the race has been a mainstay of the racing calendar ever since. The first Grand Prix saw 200,000 people spectating, although tickets were expensive at the time. Today, the support is still very enthusiastic, particularly from Finns, with locals making up ten percent while the majority are visitors from Germany. The trophies are "handmade by Herendi Porcelánmanufaktúra Zrt. with an approximate production time of six months at a cost of €40,000" each.

Due to the nature of the track, narrow, twisty and often dusty because of under-use, the Hungarian Grand Prix is associated with processional races, with sometimes many cars following one another, unable to pass. Thierry Boutsen demonstrated this in 1990, keeping his slower Williams car in front of championship leader Ayrton Senna, unable to find a way by. Pit strategy is often crucial; in 1998, Michael Schumacher's Ferrari team changed his strategy mid-race before Schumacher built up a winning margin after all the stops had been made. Passing is a rarity here, although the 1989 race saw a bullish performance from Nigel Mansell in the Ferrari, who started from 12th on the grid and passed car after car, finally taking the lead when Ayrton Senna was baulked by a slower runner. The circuit was modified slightly in 2003 in an attempt to allow more passing.

Other notable occasions in Budapest include first Grand Prix wins for Damon Hill (in 1993), Fernando Alonso (in 2003, the first Grand Prix winner from Spain, and the youngest ever Grand Prix winner at the time), Jenson Button (in an incident-packed race in 2006), Heikki Kovalainen (in 2008, who also became the 100th winner of a World Championship race), Esteban Ocon (in 2021), and Oscar Piastri (in 2024). In 1997, Damon Hill came close to winning in the technically inferior Arrows-Yamaha, but his car lost drive on the last lap causing him to coast in second place. In 2014, Lewis Hamilton finished in third, six seconds behind winner Daniel Ricciardo, despite starting the race from the pit lane.

In 2001, Michael Schumacher equalled Alain Prost's then record 51 Grand Prix wins at the Hungaroring, a drive that secured his fourth Drivers' Championship, which also matched Prost's career tally.

The 2006 Grand Prix was the first to be held here in wet conditions. Button took his first victory from 14th place on the grid.

Hamilton would win again in difficult circumstances in 2009, his title rival from the previous season Felipe Massa, was left in ITU after suffering a fractured skull from a crash in qualifying. It saw Hamilton take his first win as champion ahead of Kimi Raikkonen, the first time that season that Brawn GP failed to score points with both drivers. Replays showed debris striking his Schuberth helmet, 1 inch above the left eye, when he was travelling at 261 km/h (162 mph).

In 2020, Lewis Hamilton won the Hungarian Grand Prix for an eighth time, equalling the most times a driver had won the same Grand Prix (sharing the record with Michael Schumacher who won the French Grand Prix eight times). The following year proved to be a memorable Hungarian Grand Prix; Mercedes' Valtteri Bottas was involved in a first-lap incident under wet conditions that took out multiple cars, including Max Verstappen, Lando Norris, Lance Stroll, and Sergio Pérez, along with Charles Leclerc and Daniel Ricciardo; Ricciardo and Verstappen managed to finish the race while the other drivers involved in Bottas' crash all retired. Following the resulting red flag, after which race leader Hamilton remained on the intermediates, making him the only car to start on the grid as the other drivers pitted for dry weather tyres, Alpine's Esteban Ocon ended up leading the majority of the race, going on to take Team Enstone's first victory since 2013; Hamilton finished second after Sebastian Vettel was disqualified due to an insufficient fuel sample. The 2022 edition was won by Verstappen.

At the 2013 Hungarian Grand Prix, it was confirmed that Hungary would continue to host a Formula One race until 2021. The track was completely resurfaced for the first time in early 2016, and it was announced the Grand Prix's deal was extended for a further five years, until 2026.

At the 2023 Hungarian Grand Prix the contract was extended to 2032.

== Winners ==
=== By year ===
Hungaroring from 1989 to 2002

Hungaroring from 1986 to 1988

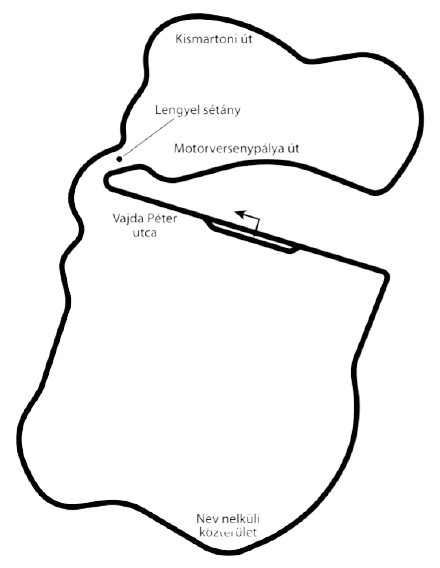
Népliget Park (1936)

A pink background indicates an event which was not part of the Formula One World Championship.

Year	Driver	Constructor	Location	Report
1936	(Italy) Tazio Nuvolari	Alfa Romeo	Népliget	Report
1937 – 1985	Not held			
1986	(Brazil) Nelson Piquet	Williams-Honda	Hungaroring	Report
1987	(Brazil) Nelson Piquet	Williams-Honda	Hungaroring	Report
1988	(Brazil) Ayrton Senna	McLaren-Honda	Hungaroring	Report
1989	(United Kingdom) Nigel Mansell	Ferrari	Hungaroring	Report
1990	(Belgium) Thierry Boutsen	Williams-Renault	Hungaroring	Report
1991	(Brazil) Ayrton Senna	McLaren-Honda	Hungaroring	Report
1992	(Brazil) Ayrton Senna	McLaren-Honda	Hungaroring	Report
1993	(United Kingdom) Damon Hill	Williams-Renault	Hungaroring	Report
1994	(Germany) Michael Schumacher	Benetton-Ford	Hungaroring	Report
1995	(United Kingdom) Damon Hill	Williams-Renault	Hungaroring	Report
1996	(Canada) Jacques Villeneuve	Williams-Renault	Hungaroring	Report
1997	(Canada) Jacques Villeneuve	Williams-Renault	Hungaroring	Report
1998	(Germany) Michael Schumacher	Ferrari	Hungaroring	Report
1999	(Finland) Mika Häkkinen	McLaren-Mercedes	Hungaroring	Report
2000	(Finland) Mika Häkkinen	McLaren-Mercedes	Hungaroring	Report
2001	(Germany) Michael Schumacher	Ferrari	Hungaroring	Report
2002	(Brazil) Rubens Barrichello	Ferrari	Hungaroring	Report
2003	(Spain) Fernando Alonso	Renault	Hungaroring	Report
2004	(Germany) Michael Schumacher	Ferrari	Hungaroring	Report
2005	(Finland) Kimi Räikkönen	McLaren-Mercedes	Hungaroring	Report
2006	(United Kingdom) Jenson Button	Honda	Hungaroring	Report
2007	(United Kingdom) Lewis Hamilton	McLaren-Mercedes	Hungaroring	Report
2008	(Finland) Heikki Kovalainen	McLaren-Mercedes	Hungaroring	Report
2009	(United Kingdom) Lewis Hamilton	McLaren-Mercedes	Hungaroring	Report
2010	(Australia) Mark Webber	Red Bull Racing-Renault	Hungaroring	Report
2011	(United Kingdom) Jenson Button	McLaren-Mercedes	Hungaroring	Report
2012	(United Kingdom) Lewis Hamilton	McLaren-Mercedes	Hungaroring	Report
2013	(United Kingdom) Lewis Hamilton	Mercedes	Hungaroring	Report
2014	(Australia) Daniel Ricciardo	Red Bull Racing-Renault	Hungaroring	Report
2015	(Germany) Sebastian Vettel	Ferrari	Hungaroring	Report
2016	(United Kingdom) Lewis Hamilton	Mercedes	Hungaroring	Report
2017	(Germany) Sebastian Vettel	Ferrari	Hungaroring	Report
2018	(United Kingdom) Lewis Hamilton	Mercedes	Hungaroring	Report
2019	(United Kingdom) Lewis Hamilton	Mercedes	Hungaroring	Report
2020	(United Kingdom) Lewis Hamilton	Mercedes	Hungaroring	Report
2021	(France) Esteban Ocon	Alpine-Renault	Hungaroring	Report
2022	(Netherlands) Max Verstappen	Red Bull Racing-RBPT	Hungaroring	Report
2023	(Netherlands) Max Verstappen	Red Bull Racing-Honda RBPT	Hungaroring	Report
2024	(Australia) Oscar Piastri	McLaren-Mercedes	Hungaroring	Report
2025	(United Kingdom) Lando Norris	McLaren-Mercedes	Hungaroring	Report
2026	(United Kingdom) Lando Norris	McLaren-Mercedes	Hungaroring	Report

=== Repeat winners (drivers) ===
Drivers in bold are competing in the Formula One championship in 2026.

Wins	Driver	Years won
8	(United Kingdom) **Lewis Hamilton**	2007, 2009, 2012, 2013, 2016, 2018, 2019, 2020
4	(Germany) Michael Schumacher	1994, 1998, 2001, 2004
3	(Brazil) Ayrton Senna	1988, 1991, 1992
2	(Brazil) Nelson Piquet	1986, 1987
2	(United Kingdom) Damon Hill	1993, 1995
2	(Canada) Jacques Villeneuve	1996, 1997
2	(Finland) Mika Häkkinen	1999, 2000
2	(United Kingdom) Jenson Button	2006, 2011
2	(Germany) Sebastian Vettel	2015, 2017
2	(Netherlands) **Max Verstappen**	2022, 2023
2	(United Kingdom) **Lando Norris**	2025, 2026

=== Repeat winners (constructors) ===
Teams in bold are competing in the Formula One championship in 2026.

Wins	Constructor	Years won
14	(United Kingdom) **McLaren**	1988, 1991, 1992, 1999, 2000, 2005, 2007, 2008, 2009, 2011, 2012, 2024, 2025, 2026
7	(United Kingdom) **Williams**	1986, 1987, 1990, 1993, 1995, 1996, 1997
7	(Italy) **Ferrari**	1989, 1998, 2001, 2002, 2004, 2015, 2017
5	(Germany) **Mercedes**	2013, 2016, 2018, 2019, 2020
4	(Austria) **Red Bull**	2010, 2014, 2022, 2023

=== Repeat winners (engine manufacturers) ===
Manufacturers in bold are competing in the Formula One championship in 2026.

Wins	Manufacturer	Years won
16	(Germany) **Mercedes** *	1999, 2000, 2005, 2007, 2008, 2009, 2011, 2012, 2013, 2016, 2018, 2019, 2020, 2024, 2025, 2026
9	(France) Renault	1990, 1993, 1995, 1996, 1997, 2003, 2010, 2014, 2021
7	(Italy) **Ferrari**	1989, 1998, 2001, 2002, 2004, 2015, 2017
6	**(Japan) Honda**	1986, 1987, 1988, 1991, 1992, 2006

* Between 1999 and 2005 built by Ilmor, funded by Mercedes
