= Mogyoród =

- Large village
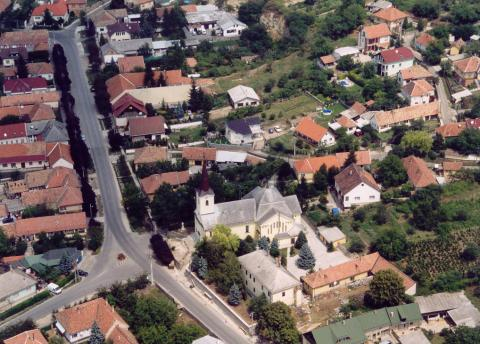

- Flag Coat of arms

- Location of Mogyoród
- Coordinates: 47.59624°N 19.23611°E
- Country: Hungary
- Region: Central Hungary
- County: Pest
- District: Gödöllő

Area
  - Total: 34.47 km^{2} (13.31 sq mi)

Population (1 January 2026)
  - Total: 8,478
  - Density: 246.0/km^{2} (637.0/sq mi)
- Time zone: UTC+1 (CET)
  - Summer (DST): UTC+2 (CEST)
- Postal code: 2146
- Area code: (+36) 28
- Website: www.mogyorod.hu

Mogyoród is a village in Pest County, Hungary. The Battle of Mogyoród took place here on 14 March 1074, between Solomon, King of Hungary and his cousins Géza and Ladislaus, who were claiming rights to the throne. To commemorate the victory, László Benchmarks were installed, establishing a monastery on Klastrom mountain. Among the sights of the village is the Roman Catholic church, built between 1745 and 1749, the statue of St John of Nepomuk, carved from stone, and the Baroque parish built by the Bishop of Vác. The Hungaroring race track is located in the town, home to the Hungarian Grand Prix.

== Location ==
The town is 18 km from the center of Budapest, next to the M3 freeway in the valley of the Gödöllői hills. Its highest point is the Somlyó mountain, (Gyertyános 326m) that can be seen from the freeway or the HÉV. Many people come to live here because of its proximity to Budapest while retaining the quietness of the country.

== History ==
=== Origin of the name ===
The name of the town derives from the Hungarian word for hazelnut, and can be roughly translated as "rich in hazelnuts". Although today there are only a few hazelnut bushes, local tradition holds that the town's presbytery still holds the town's first.

The name of the town can be found in many documents as "Mogyoród" in the Western alphabet, in Turkish tax papers as "Magoród" and "Mogyorós", and in foreign ecclesiastical charters as "Monorond", "Mangerat", "Munerod", and "Mamorade".

==== Battle of Mogyoród ====
The most authentic paper of the battle is a charter from the Holy Roman Empire from the end of the year 1074, which did not tell the place of the battle but contains that the Hungarian king, Salamon lost the battle. The next resource in time is from the 'Képes Krónika' (Chronicon Pictum) which gives details of the battle: The only important place near to the battle was Zymgota (Cinkota), which is near to Monorod ("rich in hazelnuts") mountain on which the battle was fought. The only way to find the exact place to find the massgrave which was created by the fight, cause the writings from that time can't be used now because those aren't true for the lie of the land of these days (mostly cause of the location of the forests and the meadows).

Before the battle at Vác Géza promised that if they won, he would make the Minster of the Miter of Vác in Honor of Mary be built. Ladislaus I of Hungary right before the fight – thanks to his visions – made a similar promise that a church to Saint Martin would be built at the place of the battle.

Before the fight, Ladislaus I of Hungary and Géza of Hungary by the idea of Ladislaus – changed their insignias so they could mystified the enemy who already known that Ladislaus is better in strategy then Géza. The enemy made so big mistakes thanks to the change in the fight which gave the victory to the prince what made the long argument an end.

After the battle, the church was built from the capture to honor Saint Martin.

Using the data of the Chronicum Pictum the date of the battle was Friday, 14 March 1074.

The building which was built was a church with a monastery. The Chronicum Pictum, mentions the monastery first with its abbot in 1235 in a charter from the Pope. It is easy to locate the buildings today in Mogyoród. They should be somewhere near the area of Klastromdomb, Templomhegy or Kővár. These are the parts of the town today. However, the building operations of the 18th and 19th centuries cannot be seen any ruin. The excavations prove that in the 11th–12th century there was a little church, then later they altered it into a bigger church.

==== Mongol and Tatar states in Mogyoród ====
In March 1241, the Tatars mounted an offensive against the village and monastery, and continued until the Danube, where they attacked Vác. Because they could not cross the river, they used Vác as a base from which to attack areas to the east and north.

In February 1242, the Tatars crossed the frozen Danube to mount several attacks upon Mogyoród.

It is not known how much damage the Tatars inflicted, but it is known that they took every animal and all produce, and killed about 50–60% of the population, as well as burning many buildings.

==== The 14th century ====
In the first trierce of the 14th century, the existence of the abbey of Mogyoród was in danger but thanks to the abbot of Ggaramszentbenedek and the bishop of Eger, between 1338 and 1342 it became alive again. The abbey became more and more important and about a 70-year of prosperity began: in 1366 it was the place of the chapter, and in the beginning of the 15th century, the abbots followed orders of the pope in big projects.

== Economy ==
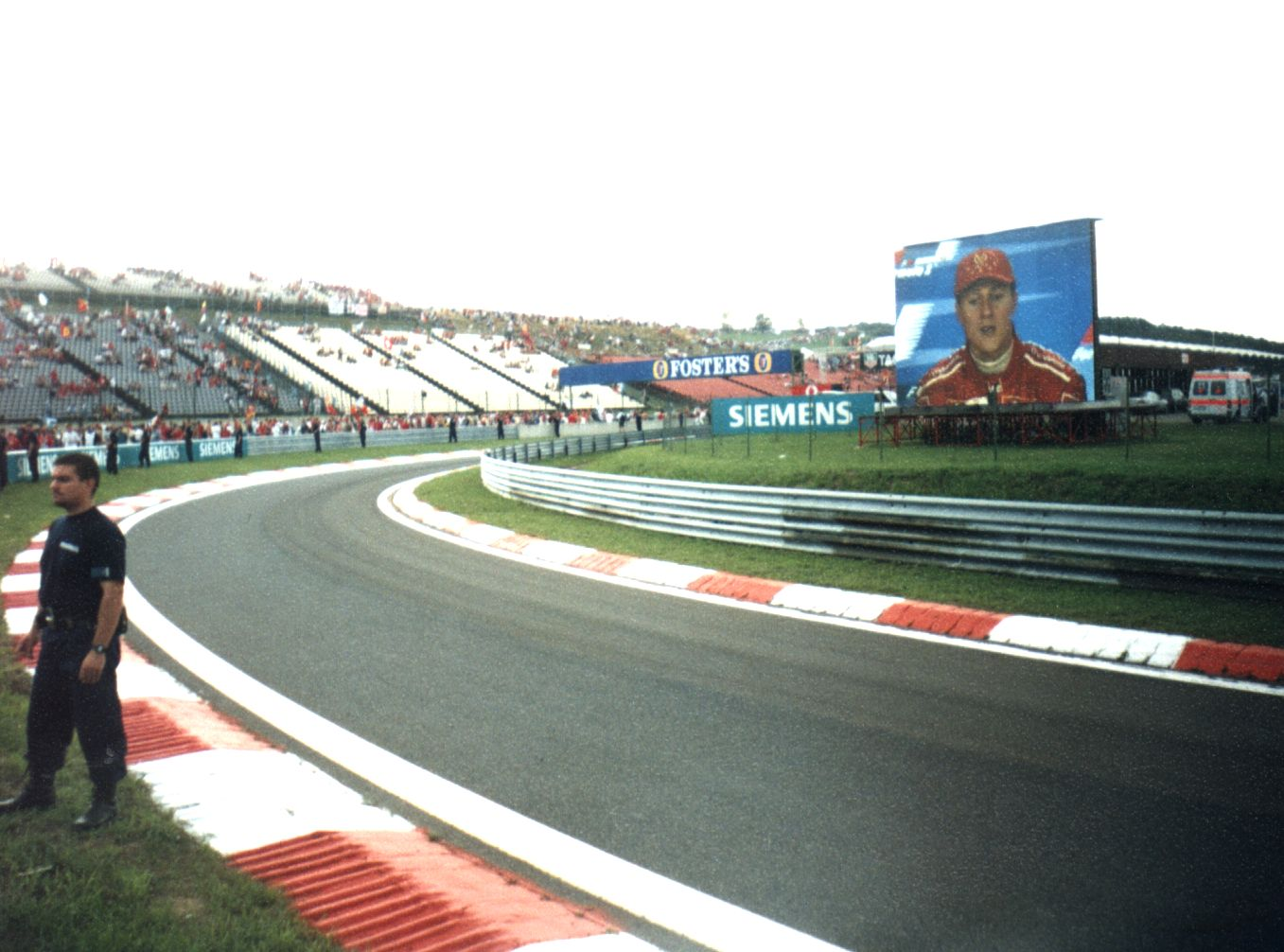
Michael Schumacher on the Hungaroring.

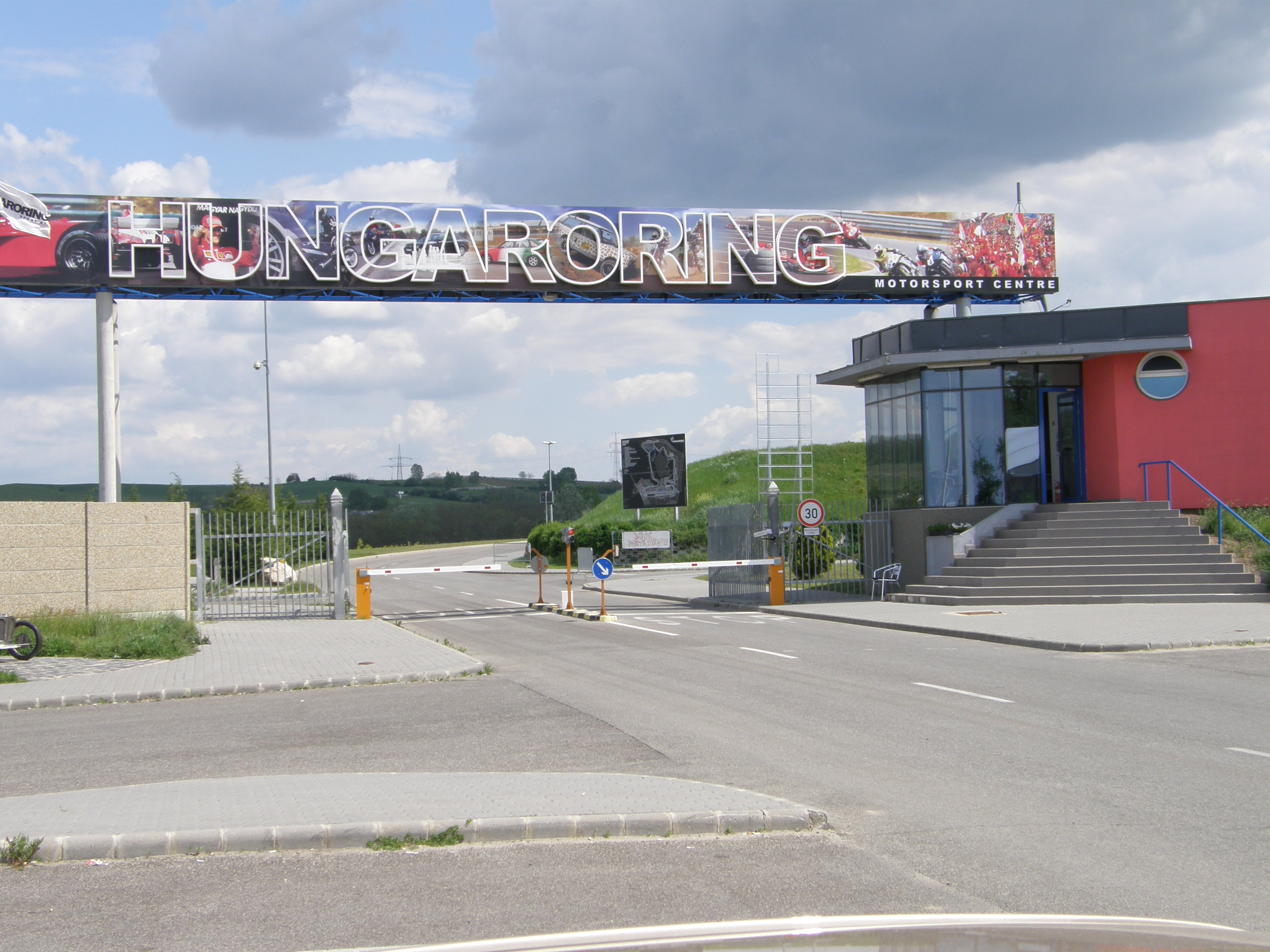
An entrance of the Hungaroring

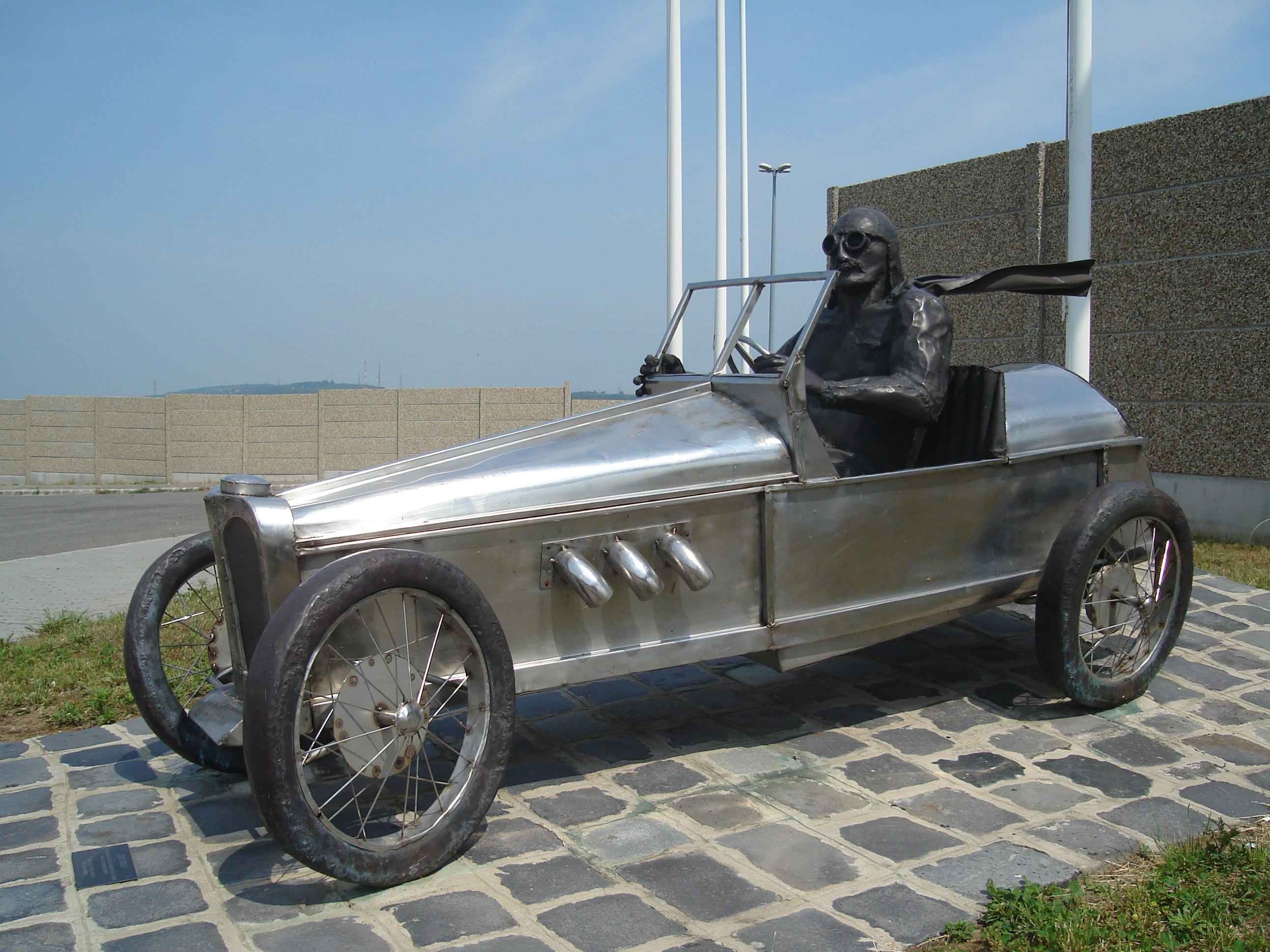
The statue of Ferenc Szisz, a Hungarian race car driver, the winner of the first Grand Prix motor race on 26 June 1906

The main revenue of the village comes from tourism. The Hungarian Grand Prix is famous around the world. A lot of people visit the races held at the Hungaroring racetrack. Events are really frequent, about twenty nationwide car and motor races are there in every year. And there are also other programs (car shows, private races, free tournaments, bike races, running competitions, etc.). Other main sight of the settlement is the Aquaréna Aquapark, which is one of Hungary's most famous water-amusement park. Famous people usually visit the park (for instance Formula One drivers, artists, singers, celebrities, etc.). And also most of the village's territory is made up by weekend plots with weekend houses, which are summer houses of many people from Budapest.

== Things to see ==
- Catholic church (Baroque, 1749, built on the ruin of the old monastery of the Order of Saint Benedict)
- Kalvaria and the statue of John of Nepomuk 17th century)
- Hungaroring
- Pince sor (wineries in a street)
- Main square
- Aquaréna (aquapark)
- south from the town is Csörsz árok.

== Notable residents ==
- Károly Bebo, Hungarian sculptor and builder
