= Tyrrell 015 =

Formula One racing car

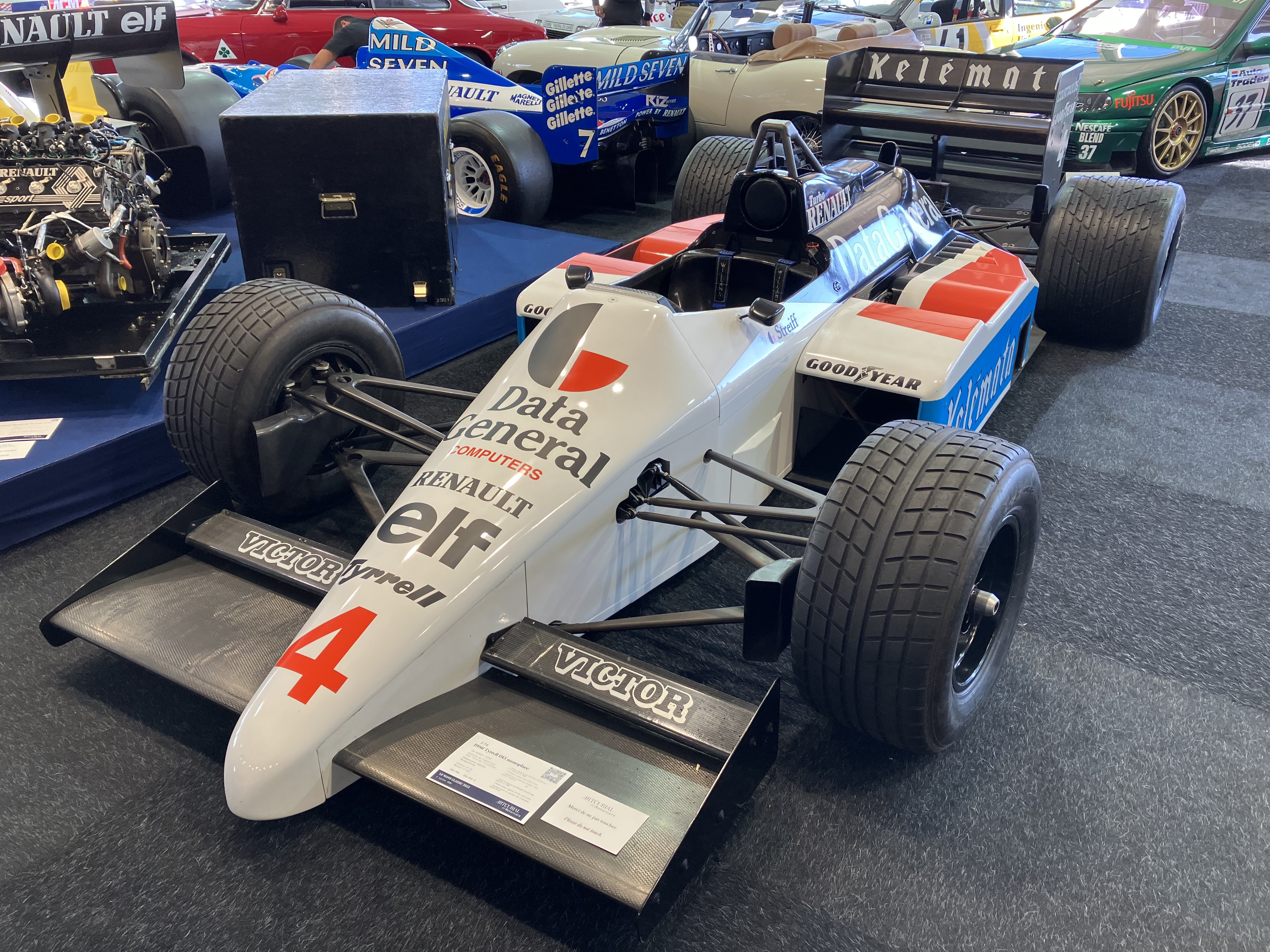
- Tyrrell 015 at the 2022 Le Mans Classic's Artcurial auction
- Category: Formula One
- Constructor: Tyrrell
- Designers: Maurice Philippe (Technical Director); Brian Lisles (Chief Designer)
- Predecessor: 014
- Successor: DG016

Technical specifications
- Chassis: Aluminium and Carbon fibre monocoque
- Suspension (front): Double wishbones, pushrods
- Suspension (rear): Double wishbones, pushrods
- Axle track: Front: 1,765 mm (69.5 in); Rear: 1,651 mm (65.0 in)
- Wheelbase: 2,756 mm (108.5 in)
- Engine: Renault Gordini EF15, 1,492 cc (91.0 cu in), 90° V6, turbo, mid-engine, longitudinally mounted
- Transmission: Tyrrell / Hewland 5-speed manual
- Weight: 560 kg (1,230 lb)
- Fuel: Elf
- Tyres: Goodyear

Competition history
- Notable entrants: Data General Team Tyrrell
- Notable drivers: 3. (United Kingdom) Martin Brundle; 4. (France) Philippe Streiff
- Debut: 1986 Monaco Grand Prix
- Last event: 1986 Australian Grand Prix
Races	Wins	Poles	F/Laps
13	0	0	0
- Constructors' Championships: 0
- Drivers' Championships: 0

The Tyrrell 015 was a Formula One car designed for Tyrrell Racing by Maurice Philippe for use in the 1986 season. The cars were powered by the turbocharged Renault EF15 V6 engine which was rated at 850 bhp (634 kW; 862 PS) in race trim. The 015 ran on Goodyear tyres and were driven by Martin Brundle in his third season with the team, and Philippe Streiff who joined from Ligier.

The 015 was a development of the team's first ever turbo car, the Tyrrell 014 which had first run the Renault turbo in Brundle's hands at the 1985 French Grand Prix. As the 015 was still unfinished at the start of the season, the team ran the 014 for the first three races of the season. The new car was finally ready for Monaco and proved to be somewhat reliable, if not the fastest car on the grid. Of the three teams which used versions of the turbocharged Renault V6 during the season, Tyrrell were usually slower than both Ligier and Lotus. This was usually explained by Lotus having a works contract to run the latest engines (as well as having the undisputed fastest driver in Grand Prix racing, Brundle's old British F3 rival Ayrton Senna), while the French Ligier team had been using the French engines since 1984. Tyrrell on the other hand, had a failed relationship with Renault during the early 1970s which prompted the factory to eventually form its own team in 1977, only had a contract to run customer engines which were usually the oldest, least powerful and economical of those on offer.

The car's best result wasn't achieved until the final race of the season in Australia when Brundle finished in 4th place despite running out of fuel as he crossed the line. He had actually inherited 4th from his team mate when Streiff ran out of fuel on the previous lap. Streiff was still classified in 5th place. Brundle also scored the team's best starting position for the year when he qualified 10th for the car's debut at Monaco.

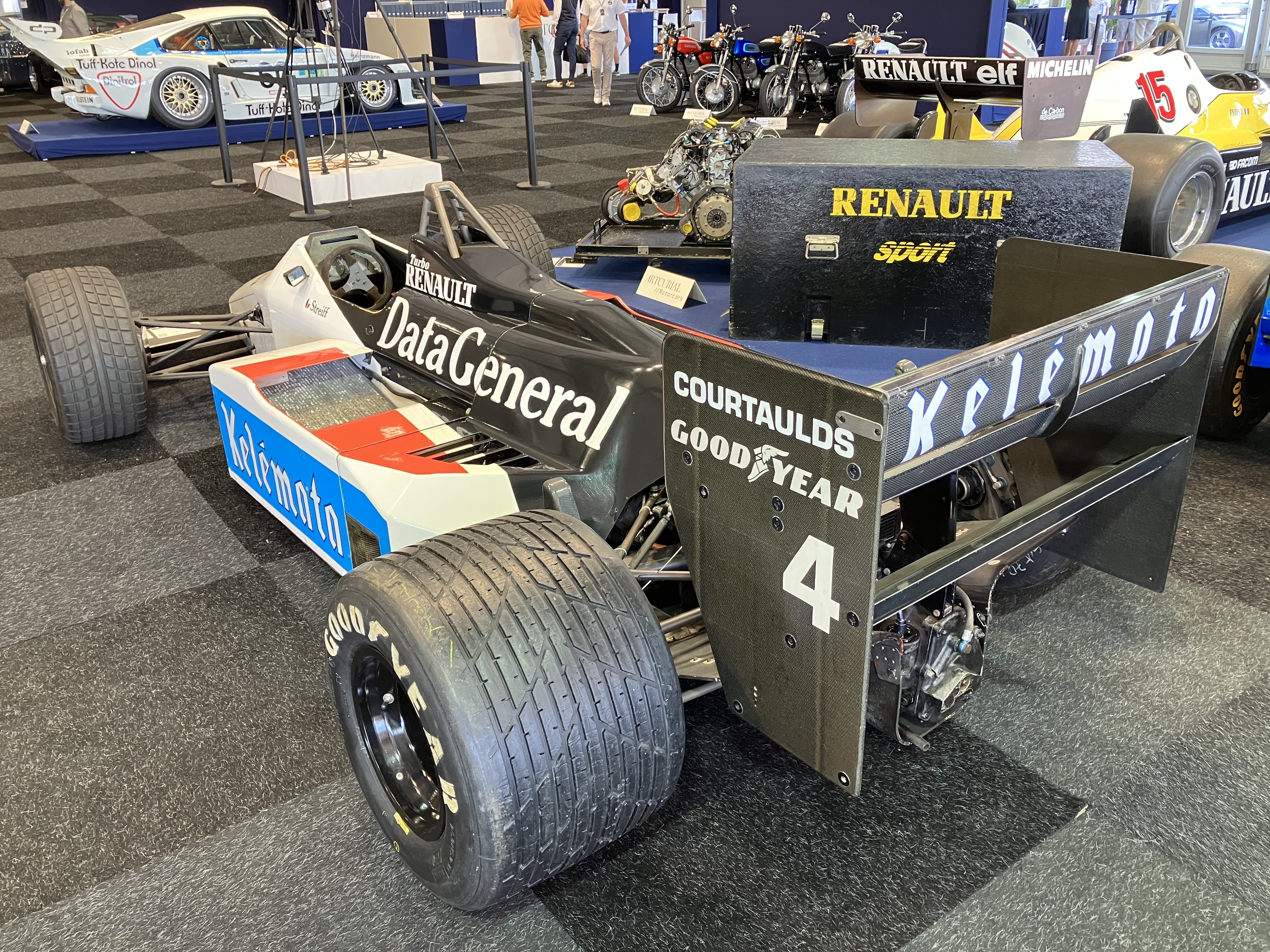
Rear view of the Tyrrell 015 of Philippe Streiff

The 015 made headlines for the wrong reasons at the French Grand Prix when Streiff's car caught fire in front of the pits on lap 43. Despite the car being on fire directly beyond the pit wall the marshals fire truck took nearly a minute to get to it which gave enough time for the car to be burnt beyond repair.

This was the last turbo powered car run by Tyrrell in Formula One. After losing their Renault engines when the factory pulled out of Formula One altogether at the end of 1986, the team reverted to using Cosworth power when they ran the 3.5 litre Ford Cosworth DFZ V8 engine in their 1987 car, the DG016.

== Complete Formula One results ==
(key)

Year	Team	Engine	Tyres	Driver	1	2	3	4	5	6	7	8	9	10	11	12	13	14	15	16	Pts.	WCC
1986	Data General Team Tyrrell	Renault Gordini EF15; V6 tc	G		BRA	ESP	SMR	MON	BEL	CAN	DET	FRA	GBR	GER	HUN	AUT	ITA	EUR	MEX	AUS	11*	7th
1986	Data General Team Tyrrell	Renault Gordini EF15; V6 tc	G	Martin Brundle				Ret	Ret	9	Ret	10	5	Ret	6	Ret	10	Ret	11	4	11*	7th
1986	Data General Team Tyrrell	Renault Gordini EF15; V6 tc	G	Philippe Streiff				11	12			Ret	6	Ret	8	Ret	9	Ret	Ret	5	11*	7th

* 2 points scored using the Tyrrell 014 at the season opening Brazilian Grand Prix
