= 1982 British Formula Three Championship =

Motor racing competition in Britain

1982 British Formula 3 International Series

Seasons
- ← 1981 1983 →

The 1982 British Formula Three Championship was the 32nd season of the British Formula Three Championship. The championship was clinched by Irish racing driver Tommy Byrne, driving for Murray Taylor Racing, with 101 points. The runner up was Argentine driver, Enrique Mansilla, driving for West Surrey Racing, who finished only three points behind Byrne despite funding challenges caused by the Falklands War. The season also saw future Formula One stars Ayrton Senna and Martin Brundle win their first Formula Three races, Brundle at Oulton Park, and Senna at the non-championship race in November at Thruxton. The championship was contested over 20 races, starting with Silverstone on 7 March and ending with Thruxton on 24 October.

== Race calendar and results ==
Round	Circuit	Date	Pole position	Fastest lap	Winning driver	Winning team
1	(United Kingdom) Silverstone	7 March	(Republic of Ireland) Tommy Byrne	(United Kingdom) Dave Scott	(Republic of Ireland) Tommy Byrne	Murray Taylor Racing
2	(United Kingdom) Thruxton	14 March	(Republic of Ireland) Tommy Byrne	(Republic of Ireland) Tommy Byrne	(Republic of Ireland) Tommy Byrne	Murray Taylor Racing
3	(United Kingdom) Silverstone	21 March	(United Kingdom) Dave Scott	(Republic of Ireland) Tommy Byrne	(United Kingdom) Dave Scott	Mint Engineering
4	(United Kingdom) Thruxton	12 April	(United Kingdom) Martin Brundle	(Republic of Ireland) Tommy Byrne	(Republic of Ireland) Tommy Byrne	Murray Taylor Racing
5	(United Kingdom) Mallory Park	25 April	(Republic of Ireland) Tommy Byrne	(United Kingdom) James Weaver	(Republic of Ireland) Tommy Byrne	Murray Taylor Racing
6	(United Kingdom) Snetterton	2 May	(Republic of Ireland) Tommy Byrne	(Republic of Ireland) Tommy Byrne	(Republic of Ireland) Tommy Byrne	Murray Taylor Racing
7	(United Kingdom) Silverstone	31 May	(United Kingdom) James Weaver	(United Kingdom) James Weaver	(Brazil) Roberto Moreno	Ivens Lumar Racing
8	(United Kingdom) Silverstone	13 June	(United Kingdom) James Weaver	(Italy) Emanuele Pirro (Note: As Emanuele Pirro was not eligible for points due to fielding a European Formula 3 specification entry, Tommy Byrne received the bonus point for the fastest lap.)	(Italy) Emanuele Pirro (Note: As Emanuele Pirro and James Weaver were not eligible for points due to fielding European Formula 3 specification entries, Enrique Mansilla was awarded the winners' nine points.)	Euroracing
9	(United Kingdom) Cadwell Park	20 June	(Argentina) Enrique Mansilla	(Argentina) Enrique Mansilla	(Brazil) Roberto Moreno	Ivens Lumar Racing
10	(United Kingdom) Silverstone	27 June	(United Kingdom) James Weaver	(Brazil) Roberto Moreno	(Brazil) Roberto Moreno	Ivens Lumar Racing
11	(United Kingdom) Brands Hatch	11 July	(Republic of Ireland) Tommy Byrne	(Argentina) Enrique Mansilla	(Republic of Ireland) Tommy Byrne	Murray Taylor Racing
12	(United Kingdom) Mallory Park	1 August	(Argentina) Enrique Mansilla	(Republic of Ireland) Tommy Byrne	(Argentina) Enrique Mansilla	West Surrey Racing
13	(United Kingdom) Oulton Park	7 August	(United Kingdom) Dave Scott	(Argentina) Enrique Mansilla	(Argentina) Enrique Mansilla	West Surrey Racing
14	(United Kingdom) Brands Hatch	15 August	(Argentina) Enrique Mansilla	(Argentina) Enrique Mansilla	(United Kingdom) Dave Scott	Mint Engineering
15	(United Kingdom) Silverstone	30 August	(United Kingdom) Martin Brundle	(United States) Davy Jones	(Argentina) Enrique Mansilla	West Surrey Racing
16	(United Kingdom) Snetterton	12 September	(Argentina) Enrique Mansilla	(United Kingdom) Martin Brundle	(Argentina) Enrique Mansilla	West Surrey Racing
17	(United Kingdom) Oulton Park	26 September	(United Kingdom) Martin Brundle	(United Kingdom) Dave Scott	(United Kingdom) Martin Brundle	Dave Price Racing
18	(United Kingdom) Silverstone	3 October	(United Kingdom) Martin Brundle	(Republic of Ireland) Tommy Byrne	(Republic of Ireland) Tommy Byrne	Murray Taylor Racing
19	(United Kingdom) Brands Hatch	10 October	(United Kingdom) Martin Brundle	(Argentina) Enrique Mansilla	(United Kingdom) Dave Scott	Mint Engineering
20	(United Kingdom) Thruxton	24 October	(United Kingdom) Martin Brundle	(United Kingdom) Martin Brundle	(United Kingdom) Martin Brundle	Dave Price Racing
NC	(United Kingdom) Thruxton	13 November	(Brazil) Ayrton Senna	(Brazil) Ayrton Senna	(Brazil) Ayrton Senna	West Surrey Racing

== Championship Standings ==
Pos.	Driver	Car	Team	Pts
1	(Republic of Ireland) Tommy Byrne	Ralt-Toyota RT3	Murray Taylor Racing	101
2	(Argentina) Enrique Mansilla	Ralt-Toyota RT3	West Surrey Racing	98
3	(United Kingdom) Dave Scott	Ralt-Toyota RT3; Ralt-Volkswagen RT3	Mint Engineering	74
4	(United Kingdom) Martin Brundle	Ralt-Volkswagen RT3	Dave Price Racing	60
5	(United Kingdom) James Weaver	Ralt-Toyota RT3	Eddie Jordan Racing	53
6	(Brazil) Roberto Moreno	Ralt-Toyota RT3; Ralt-Alfa Romeo RT3	Ivens Lumar Racing	42
7	(United Kingdom) David Sears	Ralt-Toyota RT3		11
7	(United Kingdom) Richard Trott	Ralt-Toyota RT3	Anson Racing, Richard Trott Racing	11
9	(Brazil) Luiz Schaffer	Ralt-Toyota RT3	Neil Trundle Racing	10
10	(Switzerland) Mario Hytten	Ralt-Toyota RT3	DB Motorsport	8
11	(United States) Davy Jones	Ralt-Toyota RT3	Murray Taylor Racing	6
12	(Spain) Carlos Abella	Ralt-Volkswagen RT3	Nick Cook Racing, Galvani Racing	5
12	(Mexico) Alfonso Toledano	Ralt-Toyota RT3		5
12	(United Kingdom) David Leslie	Magnum -Toyota 823	Robinson Motorsport, Eddie Jordan Racing	5
12	(United Kingdom) Mike O'Brien	Anson-Toyota SA3	Luton Airport / Horizon	5
12	(Sweden) Bengt Trägårdh	Ralt-Volkswagen RT3	Dave Price Racing	5
17	(United Kingdom) Mike White	Ralt-Toyota RT3		4
17	(Argentina) Enrique Benamo	Ralt-Toyota RT3		4
17	(United Kingdom) Tim Lee-Davey	Ralt-Toyota RT3		4
20	(United Kingdom) Dave Coyne	Ralt-Toyota RT3		3
20	(United States) Peter Artgetsinger	Ralt-Toyota RT3		3
22	(United Kingdom) Calvin Fish	Ralt-Toyota RT3		2
