= Enrique Mansilla =

Argentine racing driver (born 1958)

- Born: Enrique Oscar Mansilla; 14 February 1958 (age 68); Buenos Aires, Argentina

Champ Car career
- 3 races run over 1 year
- Years active: 1985
- Team: Hemelgarn
- Best finish: 31st (1985)
- First race: 1985 Provimi Veal 200 (Road America)
- Last race: 1985 Molson Indy 300 (Sanair)
Wins	Podiums	Poles
0	0	0

Enrique Oscar "Quique" Mansilla (born 14 February 1958) is an Argentine former racing driver and motorsport executive. Widely known for his rivalry with Ayrton Senna, Mansilla competed in the IndyCar World Series at three races in 1985.

Born in Buenos Aires, Mansilla enrolled at a local racing school after completing his mandatory military service. He moved to England in 1980 to compete in Formula Ford, where he formed a fractious rivalry with Van Diemen teammate Ayrton Senna. The pair were involved in several incidents across the 1981 season, during which Mansilla won the P&O Ferries Championship. He competed in the 1982 British Formula Three Championship for West Surrey Racing, finishing runner-up to Tommy Byrne after a close title battle, amid a loss of funding following the Argentine invasion of the Falkland Islands and subsequent Falklands War. In 1983, Mansilla competed in European Formula Two, scoring two points finishes at Jarama and Zolder. The following year, he contested several Canadian-American Challenge Cup events in March and Toleman machinery. In 1985, Mansilla entered three CART IndyCar World Series races for Hemelgarn, with a best finish of ninth on debut at Road America.

Upon his retirement from motor racing, Mansilla became a gold and diamond hunter in Liberia, where he was kidnapped for six months during the First Liberian Civil War by the Independent National Patriotic Front in 1990, and held captive as ransom. After his release, Mansilla continued to work in the gold and diamond industries in Monrovia, before returning to Argentina. He later became a driver and team consultant, as well as the founder of the PMO Racing team in touring car racing, and head of the Argentinian Porsche GT4 Championship.

== Racing record ==
=== Complete European Formula Two Championship results ===
(key) (Races in bold indicate pole position; races in italics indicate fastest lap)

Year	Entrant	Chassis	Engine	1	2	3	4	5	6	7	8	9	10	11	12	Pos.	Pts
1983	Gresham Racing	March	BMW	SIL; Ret	THR; 7	HOC	NÜR; DNS	VAL; Ret	PAU	JAR; 6	DON; 10	MIS; Ret	PER; Ret	ZOL; 6	MUG; Ret	19th	2

=== PPG Indycar Series ===
(key) (Races in bold indicate pole position)

Year	Team	Chassis	Engine	1	2	3	4	5	6	7	8	9	10	11	12	13	14	15	Rank	Points	Ref
1985	Hemelgarn Racing	Lola T900	Cosworth DFX V8t	LBH	INDY	MIL	POR	MEA	CLE	MCH	ROA; 9	POC	MDO; 10						**31st**	**8**	
1985	Hemelgarn Racing	March 85C	Cosworth DFX V8t											SAN; 12	MCH	LAG	PHX	MIA	**31st**	**8**	

== See also ==
- List of kidnappings (1990–1999)
- List of solved missing person cases (1990s)
