= Tyrrell 014 =

Formula One race car

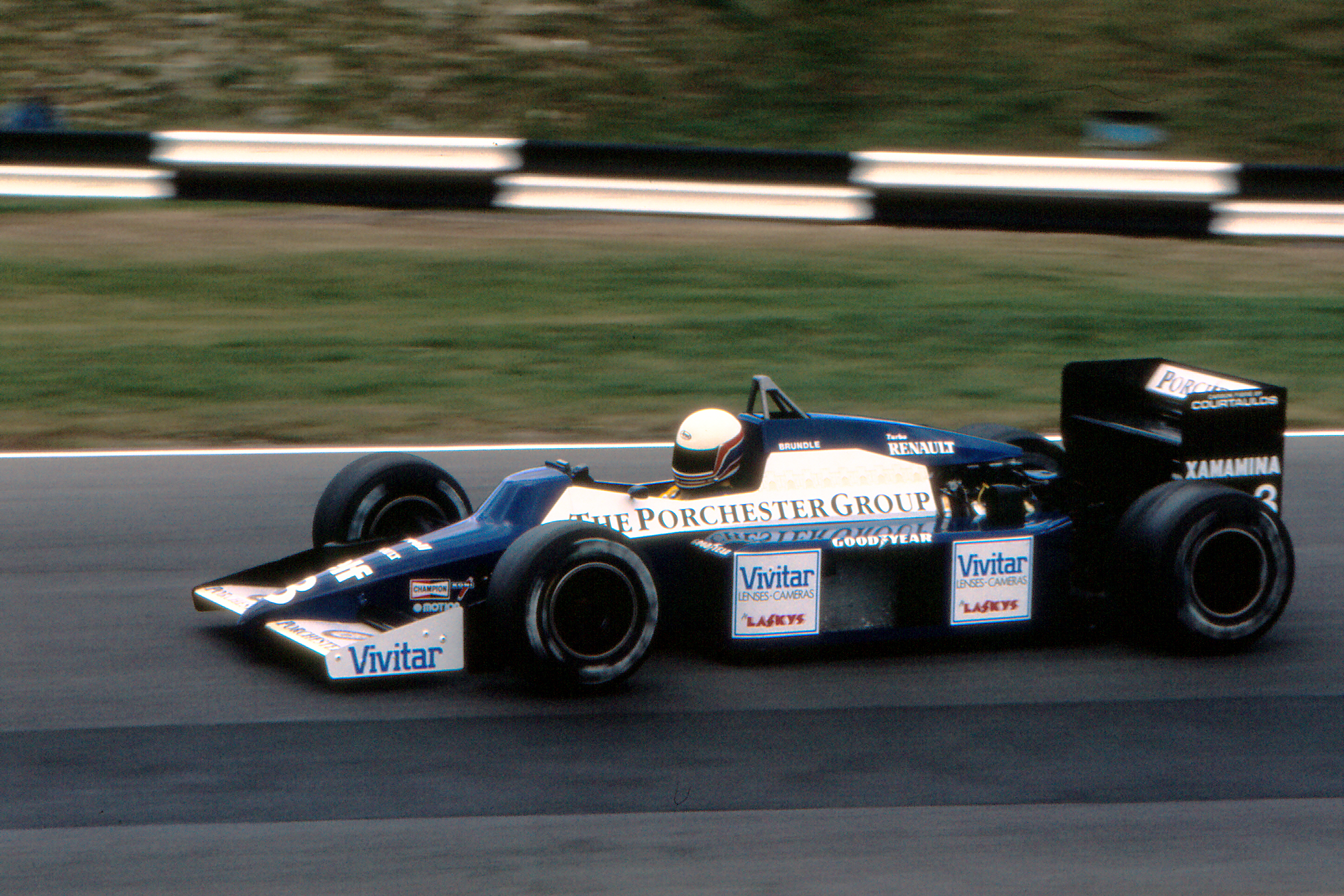
- Martin Brundle driving the 014 at the 1985 European Grand Prix
- Category: Formula One
- Constructor: Tyrrell
- Designers: Maurice Philippe (Technical Director); Brian Lisles (Chief Designer)
- Predecessor: 012
- Successor: 015

Technical specifications
- Chassis: Aluminium and Carbon fibre monocoque
- Suspension (front): Double wishbones, pullrods
- Suspension (rear): Double wishbones, pullrods
- Axle track: Front: 1,765 mm (69.5 in); Rear: 1,638 mm (64.5 in)
- Wheelbase: 2,756 mm (108.5 in)
- Engine: Renault Gordini EF4B 1,492 cc (91.0 cu in), 90° V6, turbo, mid-engine, longitudinally mounted
- Transmission: Tyrrell / Hewland 5-speed manual
- Weight: 550 kg (1,210 lb)
- Fuel: Elf
- Tyres: Goodyear

Competition history
- Notable entrants: Team Tyrrell (1985); Data General Team Tyrrell (1986)
- Notable drivers: 3. (United Kingdom) Martin Brundle (1985–1986); 3/4. (Germany) Stefan Bellof (1985), 4. (Italy) Ivan Capelli (1985), 4. (France) Philippe Streiff (1985–1986)
- Debut: 1985 French Grand Prix
- Last event: 1986 Detroit Grand Prix
Races	Wins	Poles	F/Laps
13	0	0	0
- Constructors' Championships: 0
- Drivers' Championships: 0

The Tyrrell 014 was a Formula One car, designed for Tyrrell Racing by Maurice Philippe for use in the 1985 season. The cars were powered by the turbocharged Renault EF4B V6 engine.

Tyrrell skipped the number 013 because it was considered unlucky.

== Overview ==
The car was successor of the 012, which was powered by naturally aspirated Ford Cosworth DFY V8 engine. The team was in fact the last to secure a turbocharged engine deal. The development of the new car was, however, halted due to the lack of funding (after their exclusion from the 1984 season the team lost not only their points, but the money from TV rights and more) and the team used the 012 with Cosworth DFY in it for the first half of the season. The 014 made its debut on the 1985 French Grand Prix. During the season the team scored only 3 points in the 1985 Australian Grand Prix by Ivan Capelli.

The car raced also in the first two races of the 1986 season, before being replaced by the Tyrrell 015.

== Complete Formula One results ==
(key)

Year	Team	Engine	Tyres	Driver	1	2	3	4	5	6	7	8	9	10	11	12	13	14	15	16	Pts.	WCC
1985	Team Tyrrell	Renault Gordini EF4B; V6 tc	G		BRA	POR	SMR	MON	CAN	DET	FRA	GBR	GER	AUT	NED	ITA	BEL	EUR	RSA	AUS	3	10th
1985	Team Tyrrell	Renault Gordini EF4B; V6 tc	G	(United Kingdom) Martin Brundle							Ret	7			7	8	13	Ret	7	NC	3	10th
1985	Team Tyrrell	Renault Gordini EF4B; V6 tc	G	(Germany) Stefan Bellof									8	7	Ret						3	10th
1985	Team Tyrrell	Renault Gordini EF4B; V6 tc	G	(Italy) Ivan Capelli														Ret		4	3	10th
1985	Team Tyrrell	Renault Gordini EF4B; V6 tc	G	(France) Philippe Streiff															Ret		3	10th
1986	Data General Team Tyrrell	Renault Gordini EF4B; V6 tc	G		BRA	ESP	SMR	MON	BEL	CAN	DET	FRA	GBR	GER	HUN	AUT	ITA	EUR	MEX	AUS	11*	7th
1986	Data General Team Tyrrell	Renault Gordini EF4B; V6 tc	G	(United Kingdom) Martin Brundle	5	Ret	8														11*	7th
1986	Data General Team Tyrrell	Renault Gordini EF4B; V6 tc	G	(France) Philippe Streiff	7	Ret	Ret			11	9										11*	7th

* 9 points scored using the Tyrrell 015 at the 1986 Monaco Grand Prix
