= Martin Brundle =

British racing driver and broadcaster (born 1959)

Martin Brundle OBE
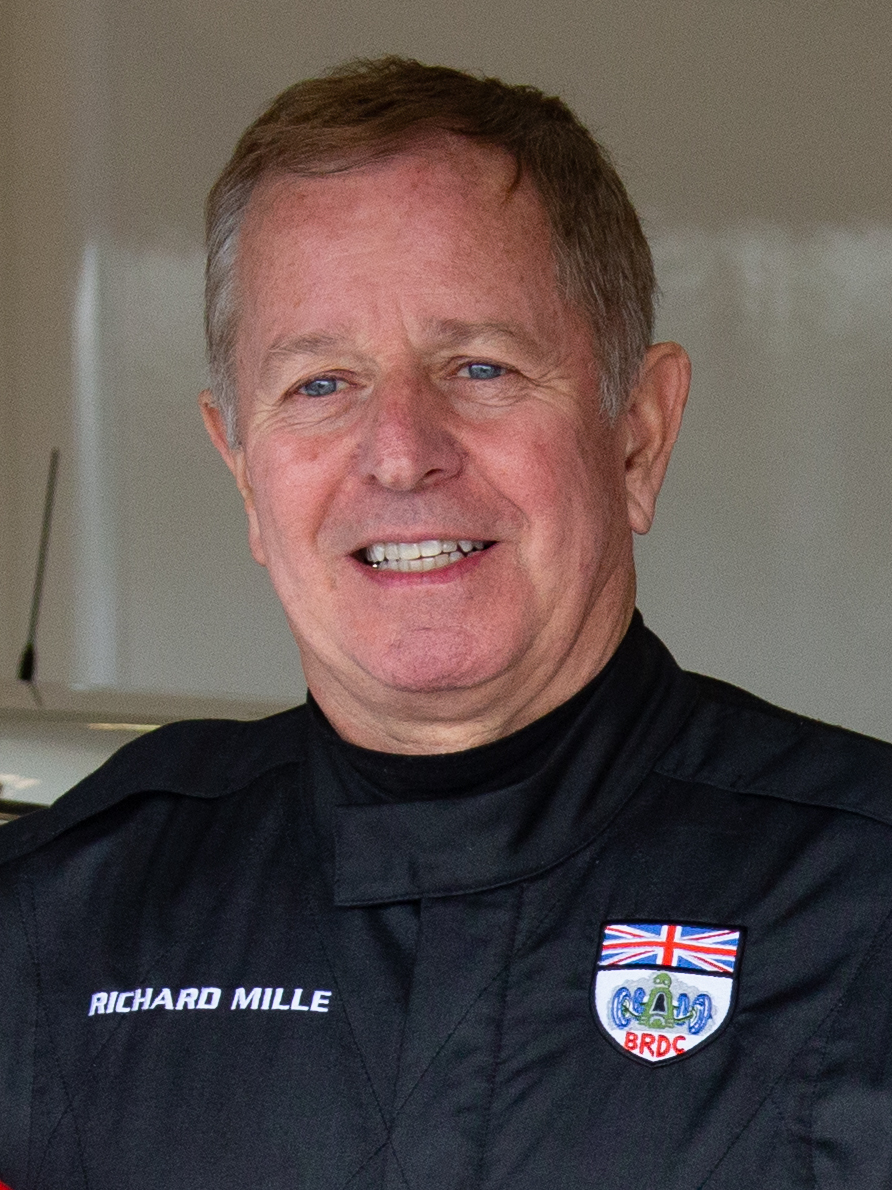
- Brundle in 2021
- Born: Martin John Brundle; 1 June 1959 (age 67); King's Lynn, Norfolk, England
- Spouse: Elizabeth (m. 1984)
- Children: 2, including Alex
- Relatives: Robin Brundle (brother)

Formula One World Championship career
- Nationality: (United Kingdom) British
- Active years: 1984–1989, 1991–1996
- Team(s): Tyrrell, Zakspeed, Williams, Brabham, Benetton, Ligier, McLaren, Jordan
- Entries: 165 (158 starts)
- Championships: 0
- Wins: 0
- Podiums: 9
- Career points: 98
- Pole positions: 0
- Fastest laps: 0
- First entry: 1984 Brazilian Grand Prix
- Last entry: 1996 Japanese Grand Prix

World Sportscar Championship career
- Years active: 1985–1988, 1990–1991
- Teams: Jaguar
- Starts: 29
- Championships: 1 (1988)
- Wins: 8
- Podiums: 16
- Poles: 3
- Fastest laps: 2

24 Hours of Le Mans career
- Years: 1987–1988, 1990, 1997–1999, 2001, 2012
- Teams: Jaguar, Nissan, Toyota, Bentley, Greaves
- Best finish: 1st (1990)
- Class wins: 1 (1990)

Martin John Brundle (born 1 June 1959) is a British former racing driver and broadcaster who competed in Formula One from 1984 to 1996. In endurance racing, Brundle won the World Sportscar Championship in 1988 and the 24 Hours of Le Mans in 1990, both with Jaguar; he also won the 24 Hours of Daytona in 1988 with Jaguar. Since retiring from racing, Brundle has been a commentator for ITV, the BBC, and Sky.

Born and raised in King's Lynn, Norfolk, Brundle began competing in grass track racing aged 12 in a self-built Ford Anglia, before moving into Hot Rod racing. After several seasons in the British Saloon Car Championship, Brundle progressed to British Formula Three in 1982. He finished runner-up to Ayrton Senna the following season amidst a close title battle. Both progressed to Formula One in 1984, with Brundle joining Tyrrell and making his debut at the Brazilian Grand Prix, where he finished fifth; he took his maiden podium at the Detroit Grand Prix, but was later disqualified from the season after the discovery of a technical infringement on the 012. After another non-classified championship finish in 1985, Brundle scored his first credited points with another fifth-place at the 1986 Brazilian Grand Prix. Brundle signed for Zakspeed in 1987, but left after one season to join Jaguar in sportscar racing, with whom he had already won several races in the European Touring Car Championship. Brundle won the World Sportscar Championship in record-breaking fashion that season, as well as the 24 Hours of Daytona.

Brundle returned to Formula One in 1989 with Brabham, having already stood in for Nigel Mansell at Williams for the 1988 Belgian Grand Prix. He split his two seasons at Brabham with another season at Jaguar, this time winning the 24 Hours of Le Mans, driving the XJR-12. Brundle joined Benetton in 1992 to partner Michael Schumacher, achieving five podium finishes and finishing a career-best sixth in the World Drivers' Championship. He scored a further podium with Ligier at the San Marino Grand Prix in 1993, before moving to McLaren for 1994. Brundle finished seventh in the championship for the second successive season with McLaren, with a second-placed finish at the Monaco Grand Prix. He returned to Ligier in 1995, scoring another podium in Belgium. Brundle retired from Formula One at the end of his 1996 season with Jordan, having achieved nine podiums across 12 seasons.

Upon retiring from motor racing, Brundle moved into commentary, working as an analyst on Formula One coverage for ITV Sport (1997–2008), BBC Sport (2009–2011) and Sky Sports F1 (2012–present), the last of which was the official global broadcast until 2022. In rallying, he competed in the Rally of Great Britain in 1999. His son Alex is also a racing driver, who won the 2016 European Le Mans Series in the LMP3 class. Brundle was appointed an Officer of the Order of the British Empire in the 2025 New Year Honours.

== Career ==
=== Early racing career ===
Brundle had an unorthodox route to Formula One. He began his racing career at the age of 12, competing in grass track racing in a self-built Ford Anglia, in the Norfolk village of Pott Row. In 1975, he moved to Hot Rod racing and received 'Star grade' status. In 1977, he debuted in the British Saloon Car Championship just a couple of months short of turning 18, becoming the series' youngest ever driver (until Tom Boardman in 2001). In 1979, he started single seater racing in Formula Ford. During this time, he also raced Tom Walkinshaw's BMW touring cars, during which he finished second against a field of international drivers at Snetterton. He won the BMW championship in 1980, and partnered Stirling Moss in the TWR-run BP/Audi team during the 1981 British Saloon Car Championship season. In 1982, he moved up to Formula Three achieving five pole positions and two wins in his debut season. He won the Grovewood Award as the most promising Commonwealth driver. The following year, he competed with Ayrton Senna for the Formula Three championship, which Brundle lost on the final laps of the last race. In 1984, he was offered a Formula One entry.

=== Tyrrell and Zakspeed (1984–1987) ===
Brundle's Formula One career began with the Tyrrell Racing Organisation in 1984. He put in a number of aggressive and fast drives, finishing fifth in his first race in Brazil and then second in Detroit, crossing the line less than a second behind race winner Nelson Piquet. At the 1984 Dallas Grand Prix, Brundle broke his ankles and both feet in a crash during a practice session, and was forced to miss the rest of the season while he recuperated; the severity of the damage to Brundle's left ankle initially led doctors to consider amputating his left foot. While Brundle did recover, the damage would leave him with permanent injuries, preventing him from running and left-foot braking. Later in the year, Tyrrell were disqualified from the World Championship due to a technical infringement and Brundle's achievements for that season, including his Detroit podium, were wiped from the record books.

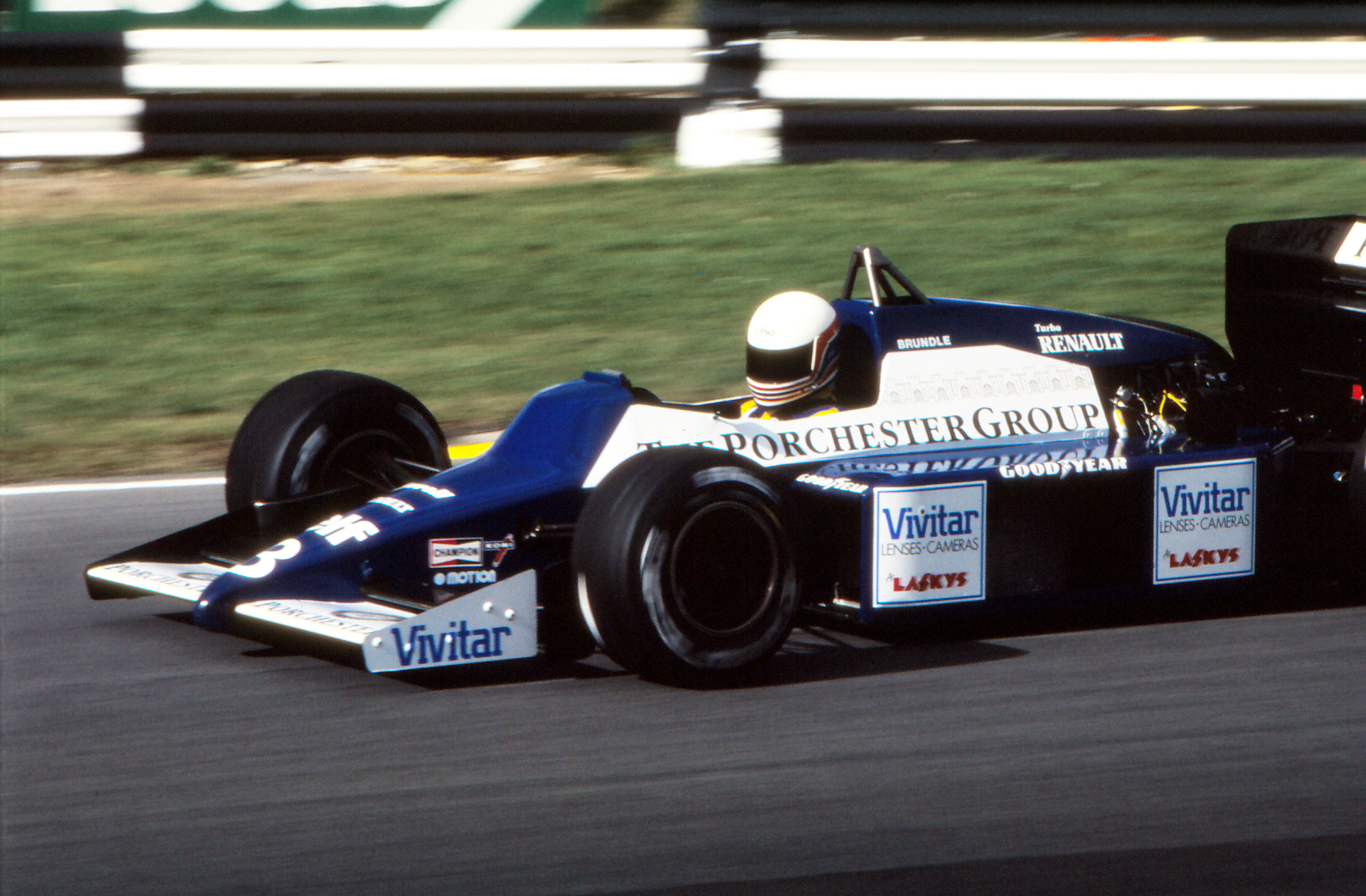
Brundle during practice for the 1985 European Grand Prix

For the next two seasons he remained with Tyrrell, and despite the team's switch from the Cosworth DFV to the turbocharged Renault engines in mid-1985, the team struggled against the works teams. Due to Tyrrell's disqualification from the 1984 season, Brundle was only credited with eight points in his time with the team, all in the 1986 season.

In 1987, Brundle left Tyrrell and moved to the struggling West German team Zakspeed, but scored only two points during the year; both were scored for finishing fifth at the 1987 San Marino Grand Prix. The Zakspeed 871 car was unable to compete with the front runners. The two points scored by Brundle in 1987 were the only points the Zakspeed team scored in their five-year (1985–89) run in Formula One. Ironically, the driver he replaced at Zakspeed, fellow Englishman Jonathan Palmer, would join Tyrrell in 1987 who were once again using a Cosworth engine. While Brundle only had one point scoring finish for the season, Palmer would go on to score six World Championship points for Tyrrell and would also win the Jim Clark Cup as the 'Atmo Champion' for drivers of cars with naturally aspirated engines.

That October, Brundle competed in a Ford Escort Celebrity race at Brands Hatch and finished 6th.

=== Sportscars and Brabham (1988–1991) ===
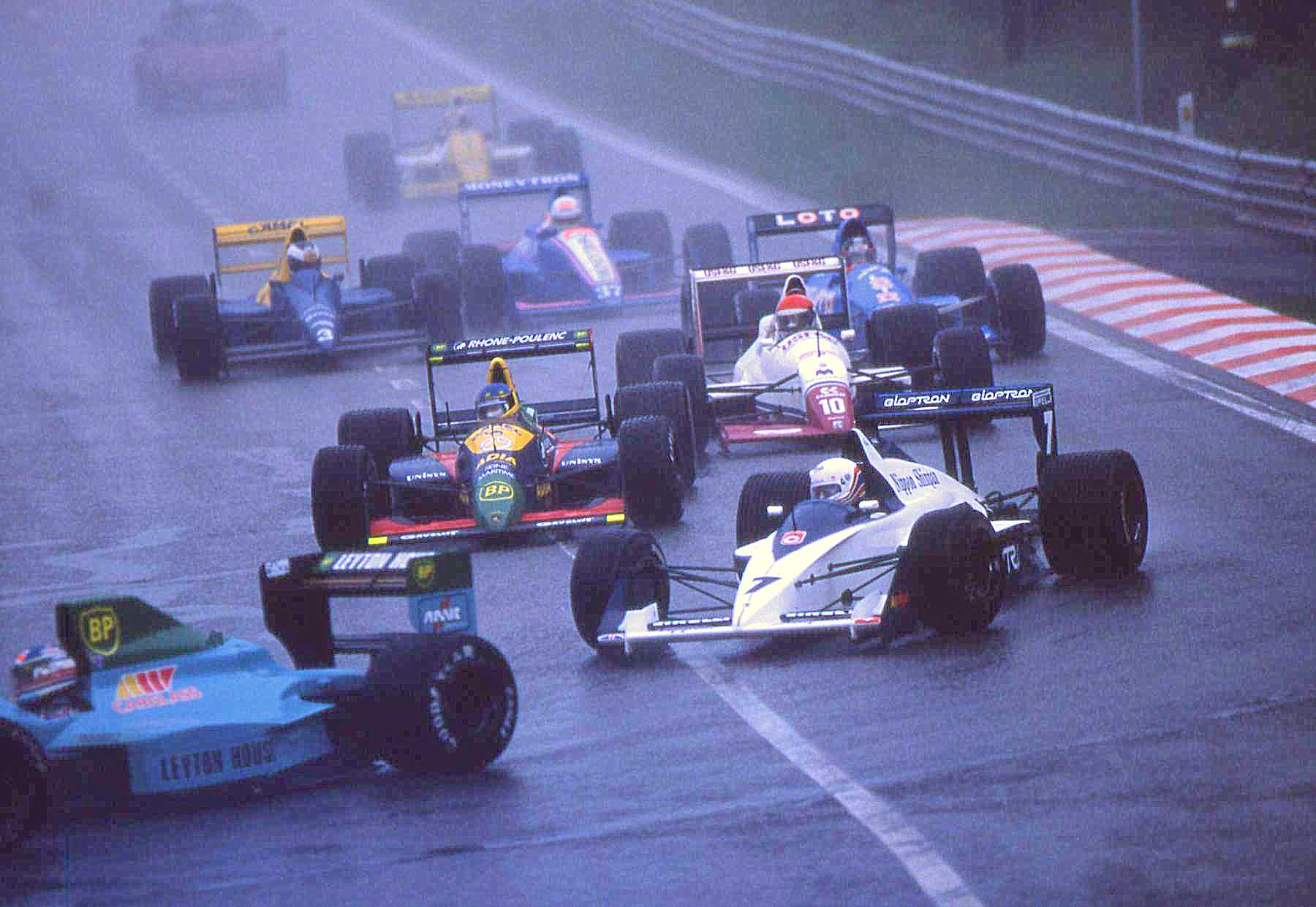
Brundle (front right) at the start of the 1989 Belgian Grand Prix

Four years of Formula One racing for underfunded teams led Brundle to seek a new challenge, and thus in 1988 he took a year out. Brundle had been associated with Jaguar since 1983, when he drove Tom Walkinshaw Racing (TWR ) prepared Jaguar XJS touring cars in the European Touring Car Championship. From his two starts with the Jaguar team Brundle took two victories, the second in partnership with TWR owner Tom Walkinshaw. When Jaguar decided to return to the World Sportscar Championship and the American IMSA championship, in partnership with TWR, Walkinshaw chose Brundle as his lead driver. The team performed well in the 1988 World Sportscar Championship season, and Brundle won the world sportscar title with a record points haul. He also won the Daytona 24 Hours the same year. He became the test driver for Williams and stood in for Nigel Mansell at the 1988 Belgian Grand Prix, after Mansell was struck down with chickenpox. Brundle was to have driven Mansell's Williams-Judd again at the next race at Monza in Italy but prior IMSA commitments with TWR saw the drive go to fellow World Sportscar Championship contender Jean-Louis Schlesser instead (as no WSC race clashed with the Italian GP). Schlesser would infamously be involved in the incident which caused the retirement of McLaren's Ayrton Senna late in the race, handing the win to Ferrari's Gerhard Berger and causing McLaren's only loss of the 1988 season.

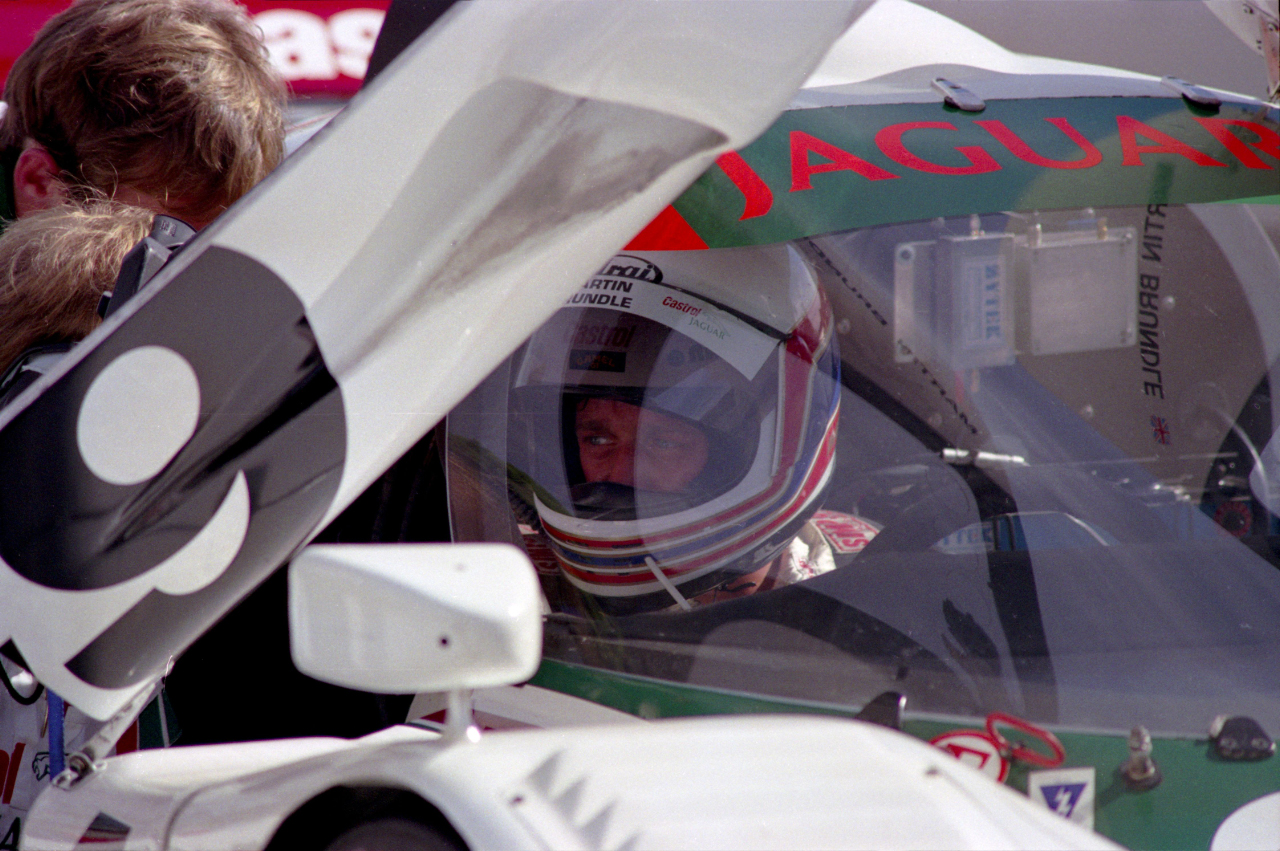
Brundle at the 1990 IMSA Del Mar Grand Prix

In 1989, Brundle returned to Formula One full-time with the returning Brabham team who would be running the Judd V8 engine. But while the former champions were initially competitive, with Brundle running third at Monaco until a flat battery forced him to pit for a replacement while his teammate Stefano Modena finishing third, Brabham were unable to recapture their early past success and Brundle, who had failed to pre-qualify for both the Canadian and French races. After a dispute over 1989 payments, Brundle moved back into the sports cars for 1990 with TWR.

His 1990 24 Hours of Le Mans victory rejuvenated his career, but still a top-line race seat in Formula One eluded him. As well as contesting races in sports prototypes, Brundle also contested the American IROC series in 1990. He took victory at the temporary circuit at Burke Lakefront Airport (the only IROC victory for a British driver) and finished third in the overall standings. In 1991, he rejoined Brabham, but the squad had fallen even further down the grid and good results were sparse.

=== Benetton, Ligier, McLaren and Jordan (1992–1996) ===
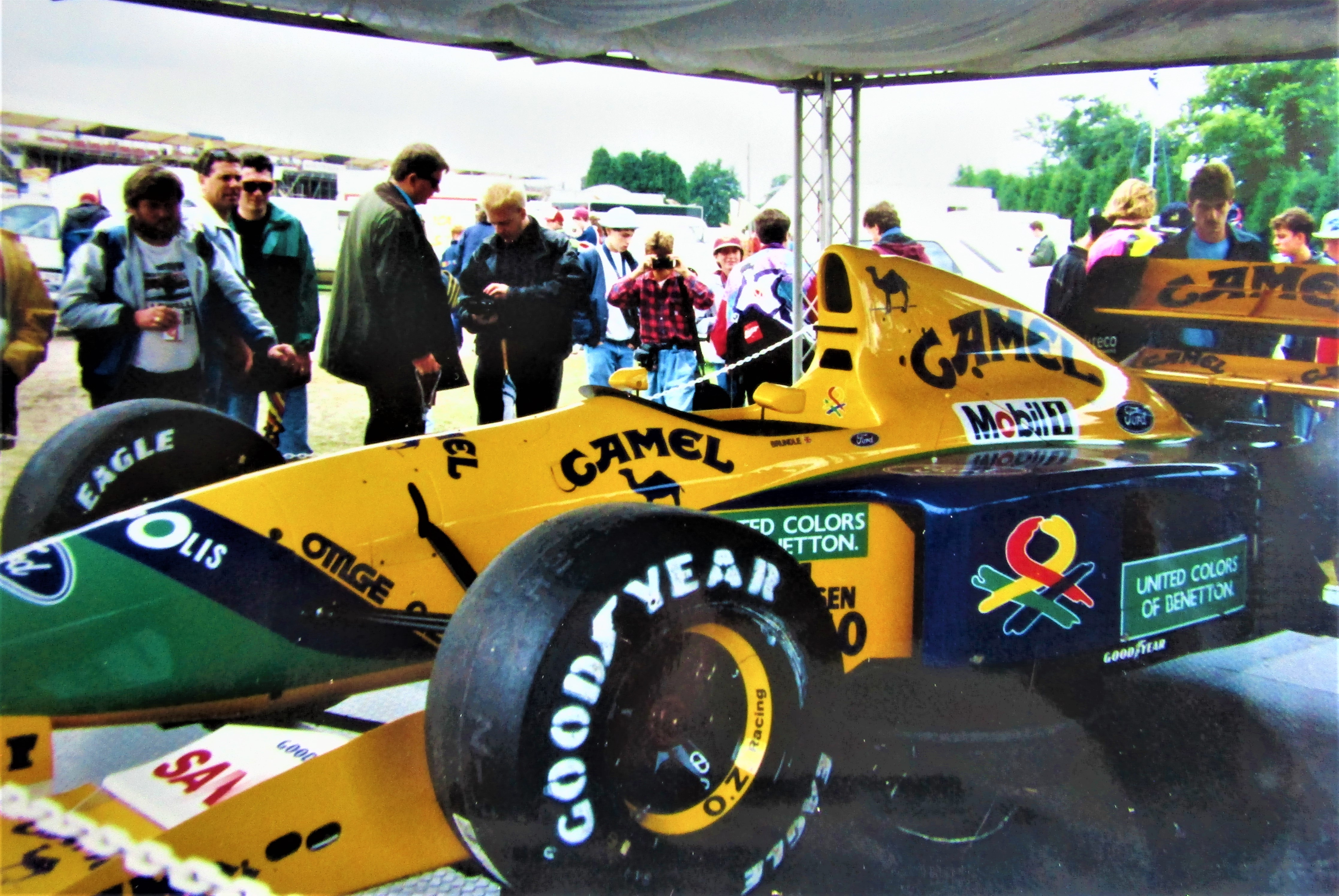
Brundle's Benetton B191B at the 1992 British Grand Prix

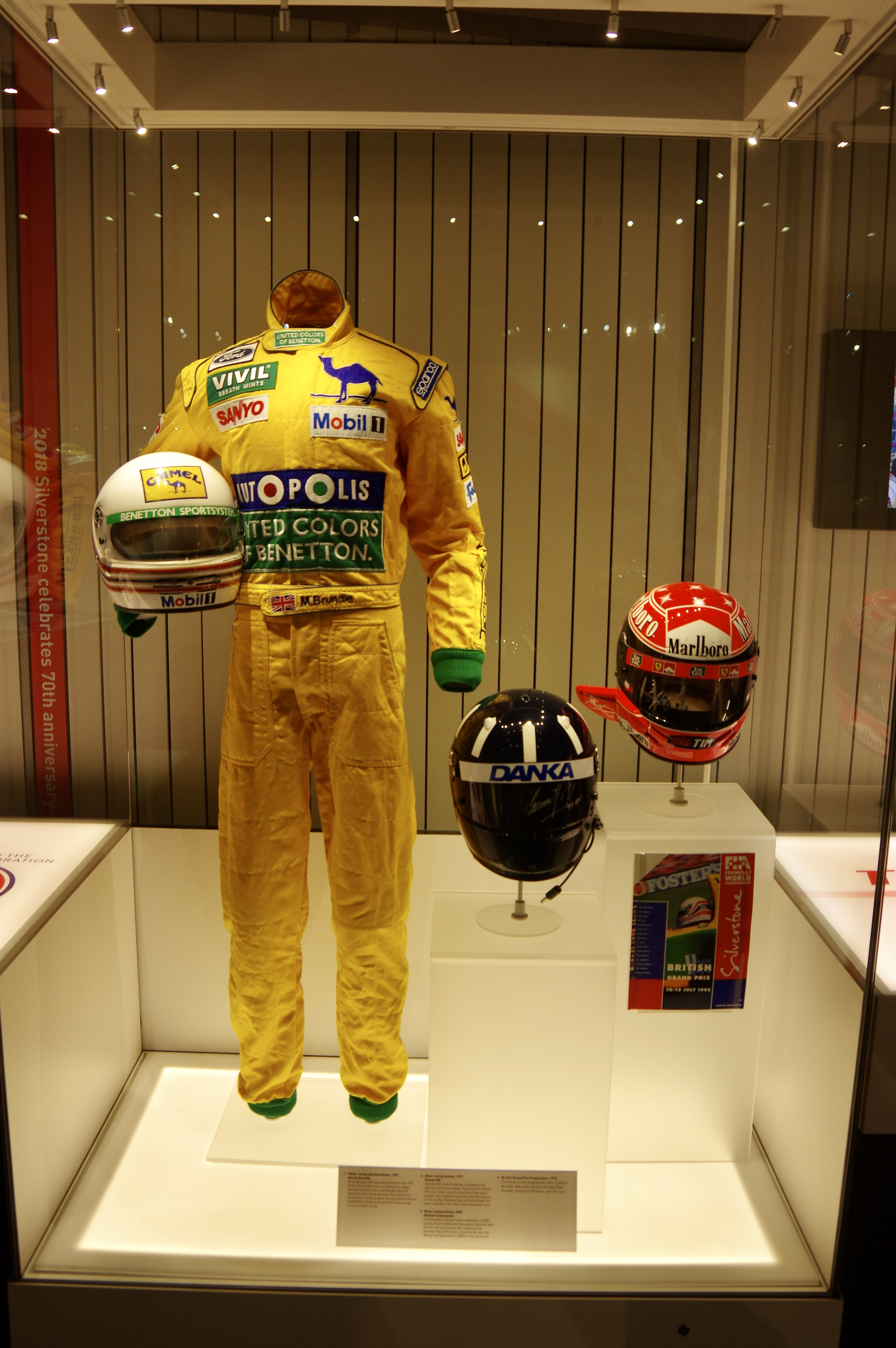
Brundle's 1992 racing suit and helmet

Seasoned observers noticed Brundle's drives into the points in the uncompetitive Brabham Yamaha in 1991, which was the last points finish for the Brabham team. This helped Brundle get a 1992 switch to Benetton, with whom he would finally claim a recognised podium finish and consistent points finishes with some gritty drives.

In 1992, Brundle had a productive season, with a strong finish to the year. He came close to a win at Canada, where having overtaken Schumacher and closing on leader Gerhard Berger, the transmission failed. He never outqualified teammate Michael Schumacher, but made up places with excellent starts (sixth to third at Silverstone), outraced the German at Imola, Montreal, Magny-Cours and Silverstone, and scored a notable second place at Monza. At Spa, Brundle went by when Schumacher went off the track. Schumacher noticed blisters on his teammate's tyres on his return to the circuit and came in for slicks, a move that won him the race. Had Brundle not been distracted he would have pitted as planned at the end of that lap, with victory the most likely result.

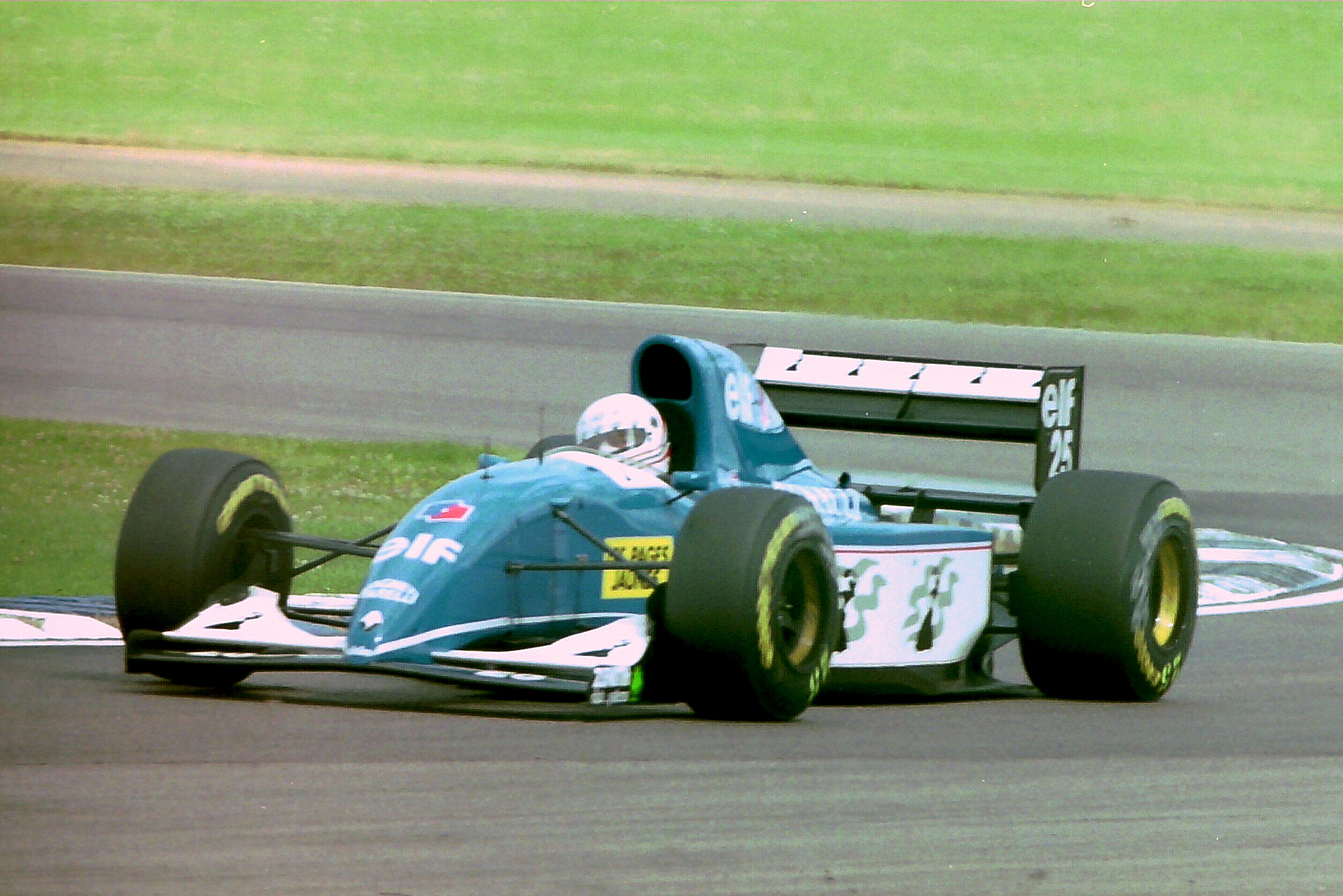
Brundle driving for Ligier at the 1993 British Grand Prix

To the shock of the F1 paddock, Brundle found himself dropped from Benetton for 1993, Italian Riccardo Patrese taking his place. He came very close to a seat with world champions Williams, but in the end Damon Hill got the drive instead. Still in demand within F1, Brundle raced for Ligier in 1993. More points finishes and a third at Imola were achieved in a car without active suspension. With finishing seventh in the World Drivers' Championship behind the two Williams drivers Alain Prost (1st) and Damon Hill (3rd), McLaren team leader Ayrton Senna (2nd), the Benetton drivers Michael Schumacher (4th) and Riccardo Patrese (5th) and the Ferrari driver Jean Alesi (6th), Brundle was the most successful driver who did not have an active suspension system in his car and Ligier were the most successful team without an active suspension.

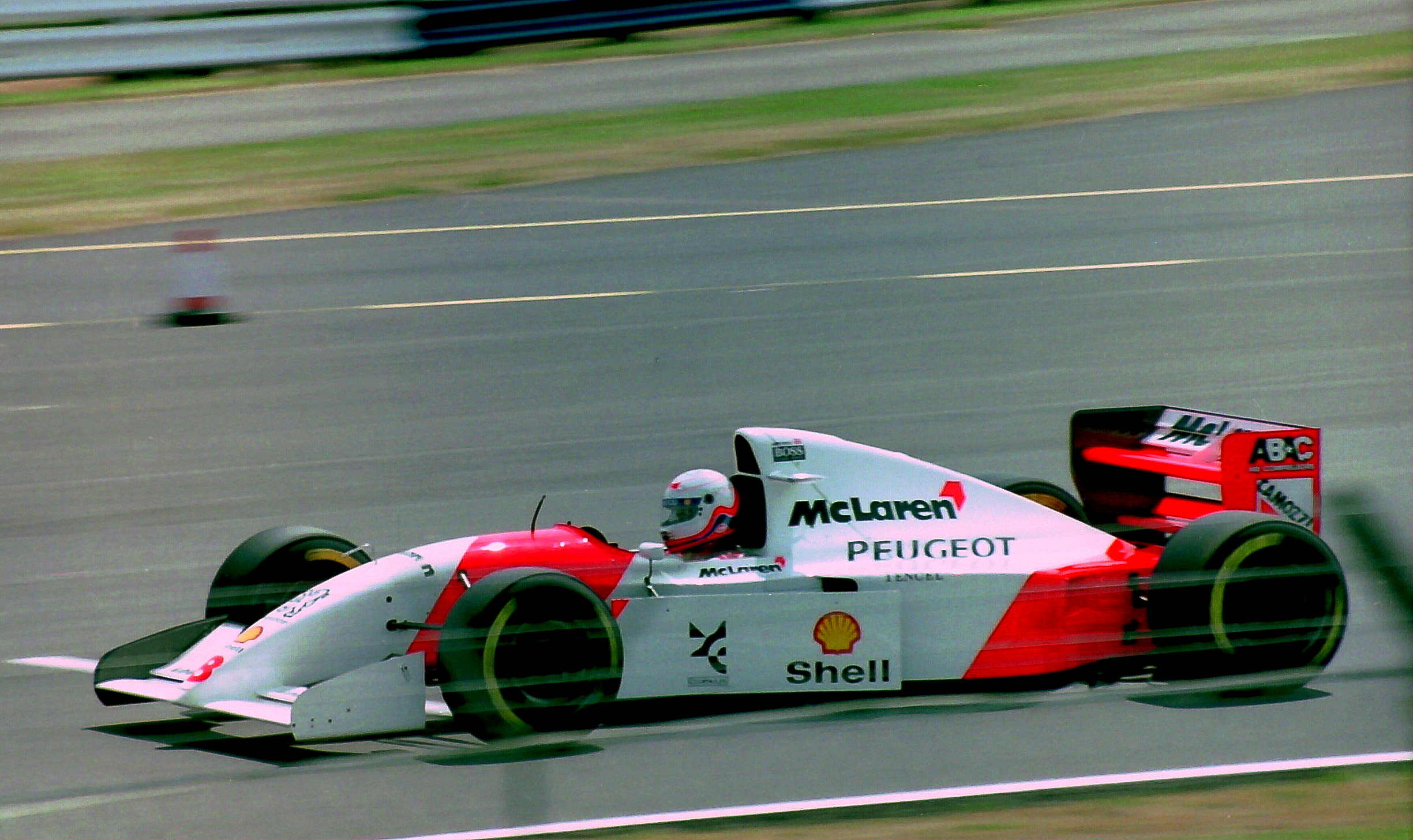
Brundle driving the McLaren MP4/9 at the 1994 British Grand Prix

For 1994, Brundle was in the frame for the vacant McLaren seat alongside Mika Häkkinen. McLaren were hopeful of re-signing Alain Prost, who had retired at the end of 1993 after winning his fourth championship title, but decided not to renege on his retirement in March, and Brundle got the drive, beating out McLaren test driver Philippe Alliot. He was confirmed less than two weeks before the season-opening 1994 Brazilian Grand Prix.

Joining the team was a case of bad timing in many ways. McLaren were on a downturn and throughout 1994 were unable to win a Grand Prix for the first time since 1980. The team's V10 Peugeot engines were unreliable, as was to be expected from a debuting engine supplier. In the first race, Brundle narrowly escaped serious injury or worse in a spectacular accident involving Jos Verstappen; his helmet took a heavy blow as the Benetton cartwheeled overhead. At Aida, his engine blew whilst running third, while at Silverstone, his engine appeared to explode just as the starting lights turned green. In reality, the culprit was a clutch that cracked spilling its lubricants on top of the hot engine causing a spectacular fire. The engine, once cleaned, worked without problem. Another sure third place was lost on the last lap in Hungary. Nevertheless, when the car was reliable, Brundle put in strong performances that season, most notably at Monaco where he finished second to Schumacher.

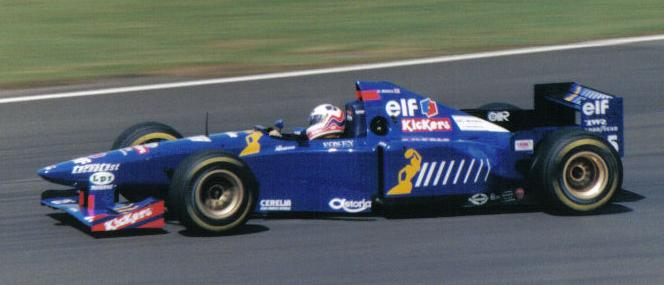
Brundle driving for Ligier at the 1995 British Grand Prix.

Having had poor luck and with Mansell signed to McLaren for 1995, Brundle once more raced for Ligier that year, although not for the full season. To appease Mugen-Honda he had to share the second seat with Aguri Suzuki, a move denounced by many commentators and fans. He impressed however, with a strong fourth at Magny-Cours and what would be his last F1 podium, at Spa, being the highlights. In 1996 he teamed up with Rubens Barrichello at Jordan and enjoyed a good season, despite a slow start and a spectacular crash at Melbourne's inaugural GP, with regular points, fourth his best result. He finished fifth in the 1996 Japanese Grand Prix, which was his last Grand Prix in Formula One.

Brundle achieved nine podiums, and scored a total of 98 championship points, with a best championship finish of sixth in 1992. He was especially strong on street circuits and similarly slow-speed, twisty courses – Monaco, Adelaide and the Hungaroring each produced four points finishes for him.

=== After Formula One ===
==== Commentator ====
Brundle had hoped to stay in F1 beyond 1996, but could not find a seat. He was offered a seat at Sauber in 1997 following the dropping of Nicola Larini, but decided against it. Brundle did however return to Le Mans. Drives for Nissan, Toyota and Bentley impressed, but a second victory failed to materialise. Brundle returned to Le Mans in 2012 but previous to that last raced in 2001, between which he focused on his role with the British Racing Drivers' Club (BRDC).

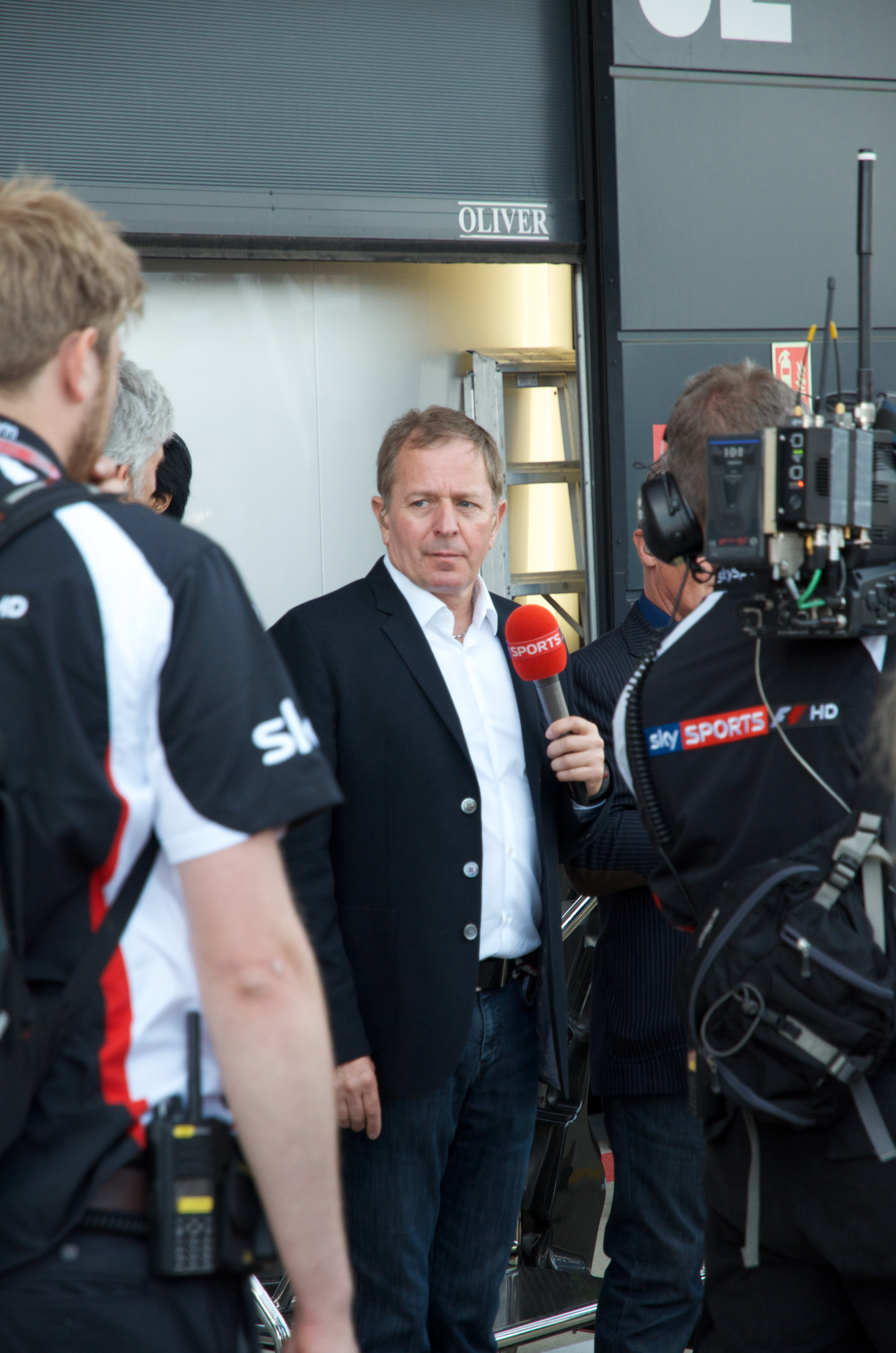
Brundle as a reporter and commentator for Sky Sports F1 at the 2013 British Grand Prix

Having largely retired from motor racing, Brundle became a highly regarded commentator on British television network ITV, whom he joined when they began Formula One coverage in 1997, initially alongside Murray Walker, and from 2002 James Allen. Brundle joined the BBC's commentary team alongside Jonathan Legard when they won back the rights to show F1 from 2009. Before the start of the 2011 season, the BBC announced that Brundle was being promoted to lead commentator and would be joined by fellow former F1 driver, David Coulthard. He signed for Sky Sports' coverage at the end of 2011. At Sky Brundle returned to a co-commentary role, working alongside lead commentator David Croft.

For his television work Brundle has won the RTS Television Sports Award for best Sports Pundit in 1998, 1999, 2005 and 2006. In 2005 the judges described him as:

An outstanding operator at the very peak of his game – with an extraordinary ability to simplify and entertain in an often complex sport. He also exhibited a fearless authority on some of the most sensitive issues – not least his gimlet-eyed pursuit of Formula one boss Bernie Ecclestone on the grid at Indianapolis.

The production company responsible for ITV's F1 coverage, North One Television, also won the Sports Innovation Award for its Insight features, presented by Brundle. His pre-race grid walks are now customary and began at the 1997 British Grand Prix. Discussing the return of Formula One to the BBC in 2009, The Times described Brundle "as the greatest TV analyst in this or any other sport."

Before becoming a regular commentator, Brundle was also part of the 1995 BBC commentary team whenever Aguri Suzuki was driving the Ligier-Mugen Honda, such as the 1995 San Marino Grand Prix. He also commentated on Eurosport for a handful of qualifying sessions in 1995.

With Steve Rider busy covering the England versus Kazakhstan 2010 FIFA World Cup Group 6 qualification match, Brundle co-commentated and presented coverage of the 2008 Japanese Grand Prix at Fuji Speedway.

During the commentary of 2023 Spanish Grand Prix, Martin Brundle used the controversial term "Chinaman" to refer to Chinese driver Zhou Guanyu, leading to accusations of racial discrimination against Brundle. Chinese media outlet Global Times wrote to Sky Sports inquiring about the matter. In their reply, Sky Sports stated that Martin Brundle had been reminded to "exercise caution in his language during live broadcasts." Until 5 January 2024, Brundle has not formally apologised or responded to the issue.

==== Motorsport activities ====
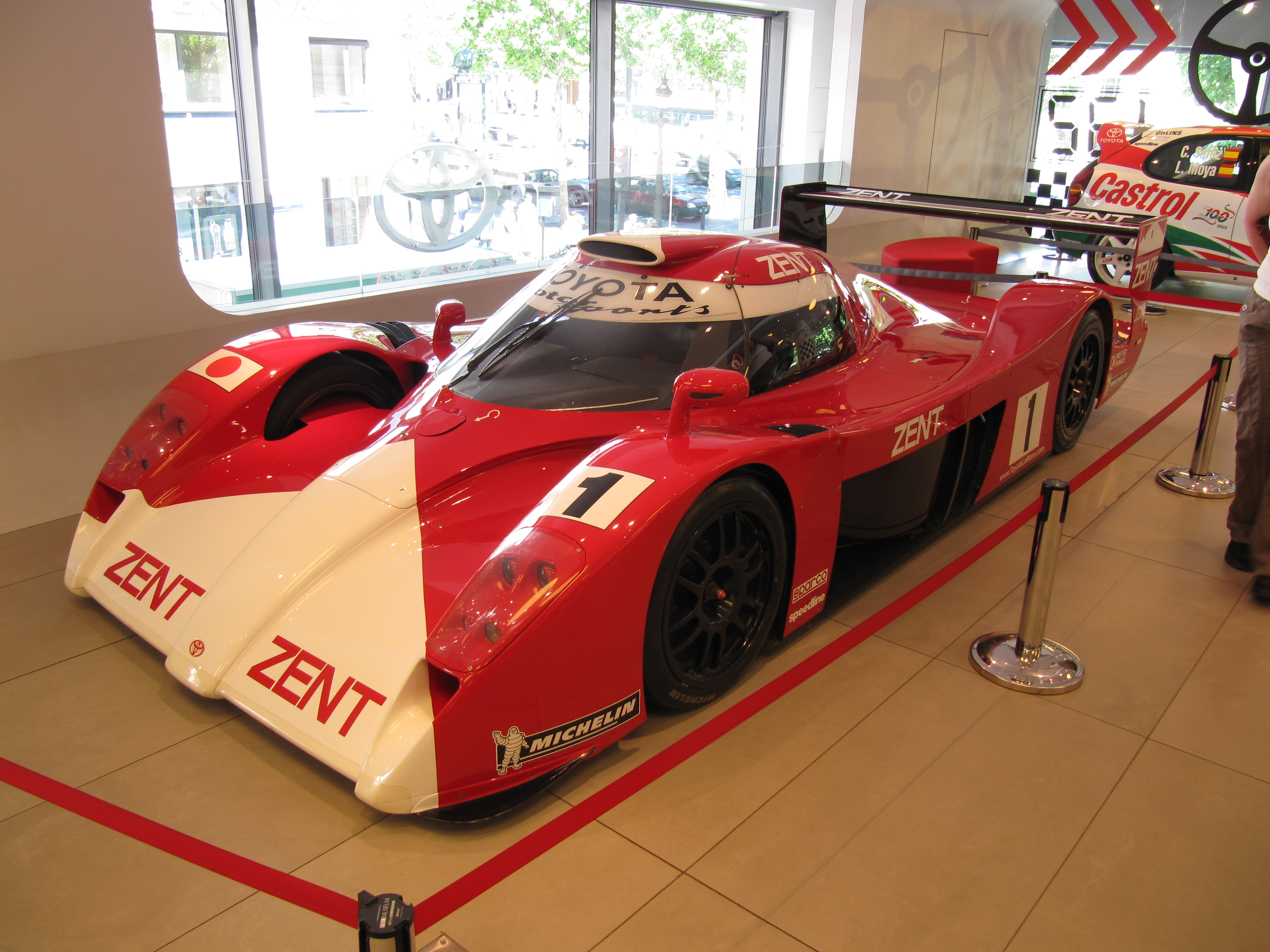
Brundle's Toyota GT-One which he drove at the 1999 24 Hours of Le Mans

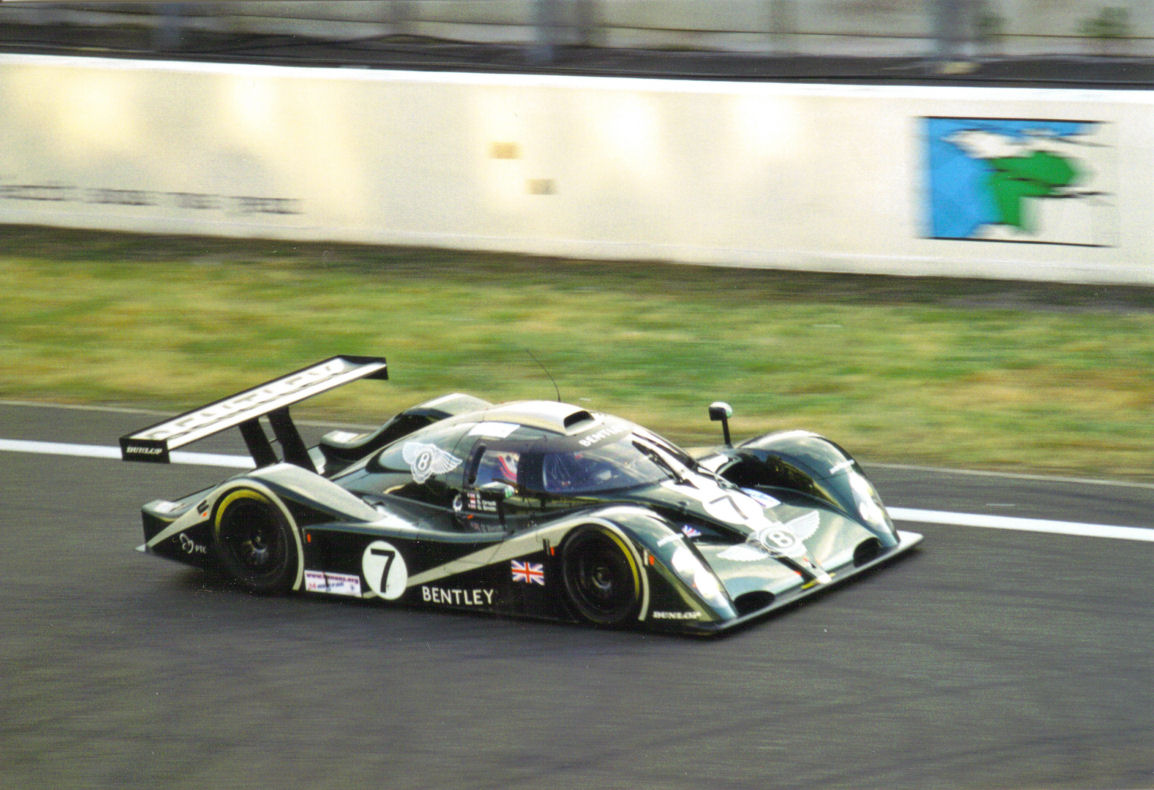
Brundle driving the Bentley Speed 8 at the 2001 24 Hours of Le Mans

In the 1994 Goodwood Festival of Speed, during the timed shootout, Brundle set the fastest time in the McLaren MP4/9, finishing the hillclimb in 47.80 seconds.

Brundle took the wheel of a Jaguar F1 car for the Formula One demonstration in London prior to the 2004 British Grand Prix and drove a BMW Sauber during a demonstration in 2006. Also in 2006, Brundle drove a 2005 Red Bull Racing car around Silverstone as part of ITV's 'F1 Insight' feature. This was followed up in 2007 with Brundle and colleague Blundell both driving Williams F1 cars to demonstrate overtaking.

In 2008, Brundle came out of retirement to drive in the Formula Palmer Audi Championship alongside his son Alex, who was a series regular. He scored three top-eight finishes from the three races in which he took part.

Brundle came out of retirement again to race for United Autosports in the 2011 Daytona 24 Hours, sharing a Ford-powered Riley with Zak Brown, Mark Patterson and former Ligier and Brabham teammate Blundell; the team finished fourth overall.

In June 2011, shortly before the 2011 European Grand Prix, Brundle completed a one-off Formula One test for the series' tyre supplier Pirelli at Jerez. He completed a total of 70 laps on all of their tyre compounds, with the results and events of the day aired before the 2011 Hungarian Grand Prix.

In June 2012, Brundle made a return to competitive racing at the 24 Hours of Le Mans, teaming up with son Alex to race a Greaves Motorsport-run Zytek-Nissan LMP2. His first appearance at the French classic in over a decade, Brundle worked hard to get back into adequate physical condition – using his son's race-training exercise programme for a year in preparation. Their car finished 15th out of the 56 runners and 8th in class, completing 340 laps.

==== Other activities ====
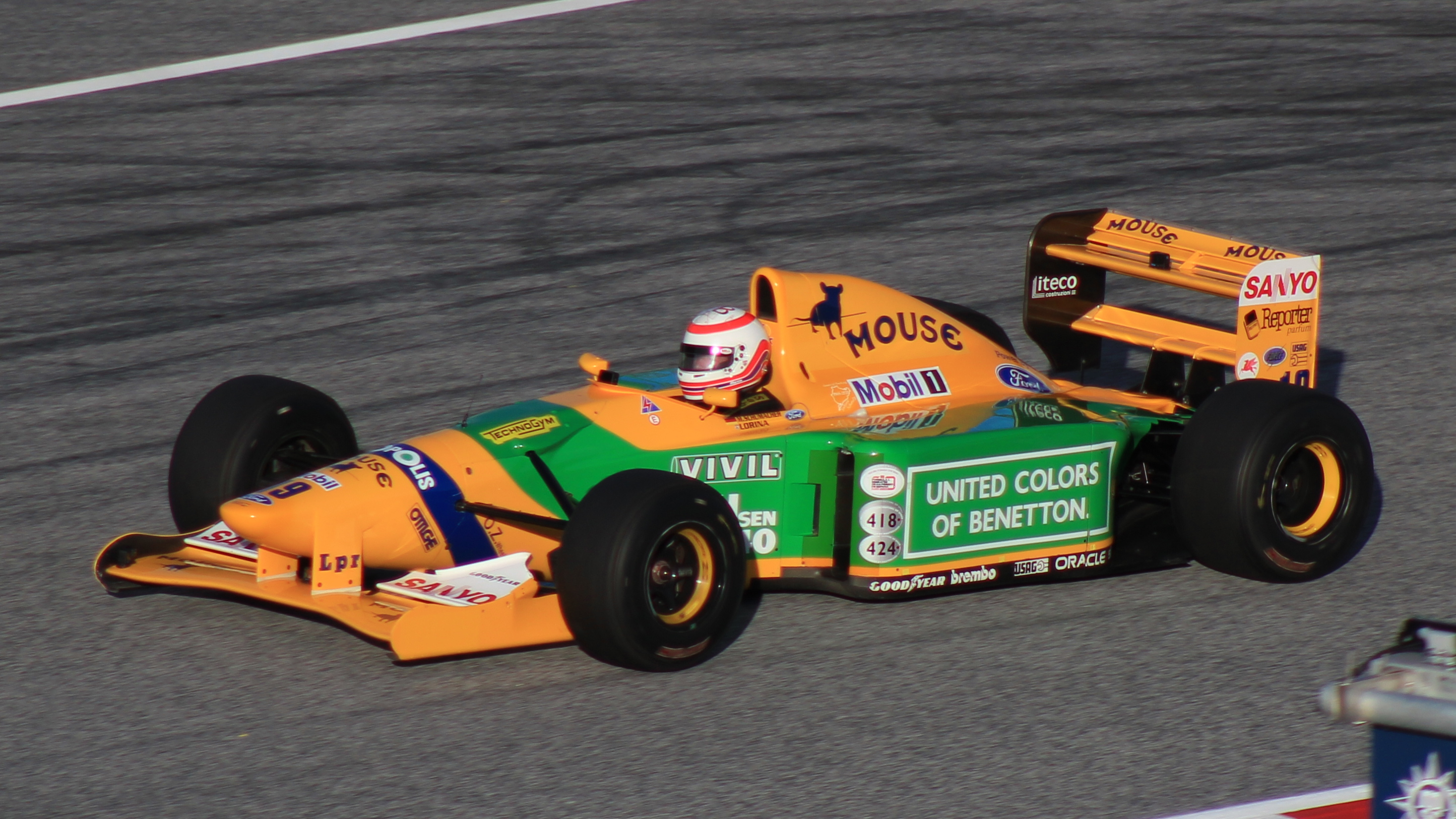
Brundle driving his Benetton B192 as a support act of the Austrian Grand Prix 2022

Brundle has been involved in driver management, and was David Coulthard's manager until Coulthard retired from racing. He co-owned a management company, 2MB Sports Management, alongside Mark Blundell until January 2009, when he announced his intention to step down in order to focus on his television responsibilities and his son's career. Their clients include McLaren test driver Gary Paffett and British Formula 3 champion Mike Conway.

Brundle presented a documentary on British television in 1998 called Great Escapes, which showed generally live recordings, and occasionally reconstructions, of stories where human beings managed to somehow survive in face of various dangers or perils. It ran for one series on ITV.

In 2004, Brundle released his first book Working the Wheel. The title is a reference to his 1996 crash in Melbourne.

In June 2013, Brundle released his second book The Martin Brundle Scrapbook, co-authored with Philip Porter, a biography that tells the story of his life through memorabilia, news cuttings and photographs.

On Friday 13 February 2009, Brundle presented BBC Look East's 6.30 pm bulletin, with Susie Fowler-Watt, reproducing his famous gridwalk.

==== Criticism of Max Mosley and the FIA ====
In September 2007, Brundle suggested that the treatment of McLaren "had the feel of a witch hunt" in his Sunday Times column. As a result of these comments, Brundle and the Sunday Times received a French writ from Max Mosley and the FIA for libel. In the same column on 9 December 2007 he accused the FIA of double standards and of issuing the writ at the same time as clearing Renault of spying as a warning to other journalists:

The timing of the writ is significant, in my view, given the FIA's decision to find Renault guilty of having significant McLaren designs and information within their systems, but not administering any penalty. It is a warning sign to other journalists and publications to choose their words carefully over that decision. I'm tired of what I perceive as the "spin" and tactics of the FIA press office, as are many other journalists. I expect my accreditation pass for next year will be hindered in some way to make my coverage of F1 more difficult and to punish me. Or they will write to ITV again to say that my commentary is not up to standard despite my unprecedented six Royal Television Society Awards for sports broadcasting. So be it.

Brundle also asserted his right to voice his opinion about Formula One:

As a former Formula One driver, I have earned the right to have an opinion about the sport, and probably know as much about it as anybody else. I have attended approaching 400 grands prix, 158 as a driver. I have spilt blood, broken bones, shed tears, generated tanker loads of sweat, tasted the champagne glories and plumbed the depths of misery. I have never been more passionate about F1 and will always share my opinions in an honest and open way, knowing readers will make up their own minds.

In March 2008, Brundle voiced his opinion regarding the position of Max Mosley following the News of The World's allegation that Mosley had engaged in sexual acts with five prostitutes in a scenario that involved Nazi role-playing; saying "It's not appropriate behaviour for the head of any global body such as the FIA." In April, Brundle argued:

The specific detail of the scandal surrounding him is largely irrelevant, in my view. The sporting regulation he has used over the years to keep teams in check relates to bringing the sport into disrepute. If you live by the sword, you die by the sword. Sitting on the fence on this issue for any of us inside the sport is not an option. We must condone or condemn the situation he finds himself in. Mosley's position as president is untenable.

== Helmet ==
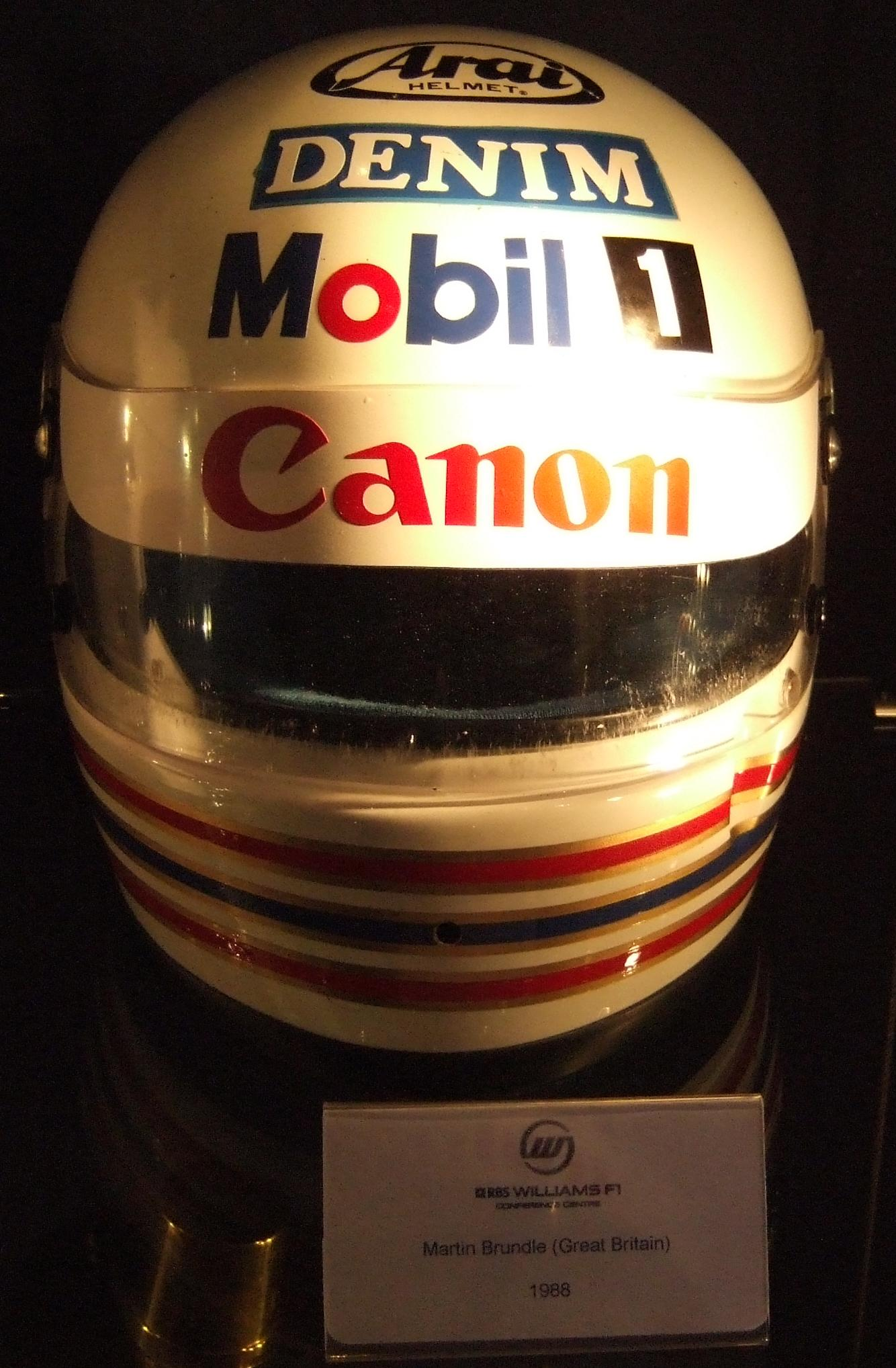
Brundle's helmet on display in the Williams team's museum.

Brundle's helmet was white with two red stripes and a blue stripe between the two red stripes (inspired by the British flag) from the chin to the back of the helmet. In 1996, a golden ring (with either 'Benson and Hedges' or 'Brundle' written on it) and a blue drawing resembling a B (a representation of his trademark "start the engine" gesture) were added.

== Personal life ==
The son of a motor car dealer, Brundle and his brother Robin took over the family car dealership from their father. The business closed in 2003 after losing the local Toyota and Peugeot franchises. Robin is also a racing driver, who competes in historic racing events, and was managing director of Lola Cars.

Brundle is married to Liz, with whom he has a daughter and a son, Alex. Alex has followed his father in pursuing a career in driving; he competed in the 2012 GP3 Series and the FIA World Endurance Championship. Brundle has always lived within a 10-mile radius of King's Lynn, and as of 2025, he lives in the village of Gayton, east of King’s Lynn.

In 2017, Brundle disclosed that while covering the 2016 Monaco Grand Prix for Sky Sports, he suffered a heart attack whilst running to do the podium interviews.

== Legacy ==
In 2016, in an academic paper that reported a mathematical modelling study that assessed the relative influence of driver and machine, Brundle was ranked the 30th best Formula One driver of all time.

Canadian film director and screenwriter David Cronenberg, a motor racing enthusiast, named the protagonist of his 1986 film The Fly "Seth Brundle" after Martin Brundle. The protagonist of the film's sequel, The Fly II (1989) is Seth Brundle's son "Martin Brundle." Charlie Hamblett portrayed Brundle in the Netflix miniseries Senna (2024). Brundle also provides commentary, appearing as himself, for races depicted in the 2025 film F1.

Brundle was appointed an Officer of the Order of the British Empire in the 2025 New Year Honours for services to motor racing and sports broadcasting.

== Racing record ==
=== Career summary ===
Season	Series	Team	Races	Wins	Poles	F/Laps	Podiums	Points	Position
1977	British Saloon Car Championship	John Brundle Motors Ltd	8	1	0	1	5	?	4th
1978	British Saloon Car Championship	John Brundle Motors Ltd	11	0	0	0	8	?	**3rd**
1979	British Saloon Car Championship	Team Toyota GB / Hughes of Beaconsfield	2	0	0	0	2	?	?
1980	British Saloon Car Championship	Team Toyota GB / Hughes of Beaconsfield	2	0	0	0	0	18	NC
1981	British Saloon Car Championship	TWR Team BP	11	2	1	0	3	30	4th
1982	FIA European Formula 3 Championship	David Price Racing	1	0	0	0	0	0	NC
1982	British Formula Three	David Price Racing	19	2	6	2	7	60	4th
1983	British Formula Three	Eddie Jordan Racing	20	7	3	5	19	123	**2nd**
1983	FIA European Formula 3 Championship	Eddie Jordan Racing	2	2	2	0	2	18	7th
1983	European Touring Car Championship	Tom Walkinshaw Racing	4	2	1	0	2	0	NC
1983	British Saloon Car Championship	Unipart with Daily Express	1	0	0	0	0	2	8th
1984	Formula One	Tyrrell Racing Organisation	7	0	0	0	0	0	NC
1984	European Touring Car Championship	Tom Walkinshaw Racing	3	1	1	1	1	0	NC
1985	Formula One	Tyrrell Team	15	0	0	0	0	0	NC
1985	World Sportscar Championship	TWR Jaguar	3	0	0	0	1	8	42nd
1985	European Touring Car Championship	Tom Walkinshaw Racing	1	0	0	0	0	0	NC
1986	Formula One	Data General Team Tyrrell	16	0	0	0	0	8	11th
1986	World Sportscar Championship	Silk Cut Jaguar	1	0	0	0	0	0	NC
1987	Formula One	West Zakspeed Racing	16	0	0	0	0	2	18th
1987	World Sportscar Championship	Silk Cut Jaguar	3	1	0	0	1	20	25th
1988	IMSA GT Championship	Castrol/Jaguar Racing	12	2	2	1	7	127	5th
1988	World Sportscar Championship	Silk Cut Jaguar	11	5	0	0	9	240	**1st**
1988	24 Hours of Daytona	Castrol/Jaguar Racing	1	1	0	0	1	N/A	**1st**
1988	Formula One	Canon Williams Team	1	0	0	0	0	0	NC
1989	Formula One	Motor Racing Developments	14	0	0	0	0	4	20th
1990	World Sportscar Championship	Silk Cut Jaguar	9	1	1	1	3	19	8th
1990	IMSA GT Championship	Castrol/Jaguar Racing	3	0	0	1	1	33	20th
1990	International Race of Champions		3	1	1	0	1	41	**3rd**
1990	24 Hours of Le Mans	Silk Cut Jaguar	1	1	0	0	1	N/A	**1st**
1991	Formula One	Brabham Yamaha F1 Team	14	0	0	0	0	2	15th
1991	World Sportscar Championship	Silk Cut Jaguar	3	1	1	2	2	12	24th
1991	IMSA GT Championship	Bud Light Jaguar Cars	1	0	0	0	0	10	34th
1992	Formula One	Camel Benetton Ford	16	0	0	0	5	38	6th
1993	Formula One	Ligier Gitanes Blondes	16	0	0	0	1	13	7th
1994	Formula One	Marlboro McLaren Peugeot	16	0	0	0	2	16	7th
1995	Formula One	Ligier Gitanes Blondes	11	0	0	0	1	7	13th
1996	Formula One	Benson & Hedges Total Jordan Peugeot	16	0	0	0	0	8	11th
1997	24 Hours of Le Mans	Nissan Motorsport/TWR	1	0	0	0	0	N/A	DNF
1998	24 Hours of Le Mans	Toyota Motorsports	1	0	0	0	0	N/A	DNF
1999	24 Hours of Le Mans	Toyota Motorsports	1	0	0	0	0	N/A	DNF
1999	World Rally Championship	Toyota Castrol Team	1	0	0	0	0	0	NC
2001	24 Hours of Le Mans	Team Bentley	1	0	0	0	0	N/A	DNF
2010	Volkswagen Scirocco R-Cup		2	0	0	0	0	0	NC†
2012	FIA World Endurance Championship	Greaves Motorsport	2	0	0	0	0	0	NC
2012	24 Hours of Le Mans	Greaves Motorsport	1	0	0	0	0	N/A	15th
2016	Road to Le Mans	United Autosports	1	0	1	0	1	0	**2nd**

^{†} As Brundle was a guest driver, he was ineligible for championship points.

=== Complete British Saloon Car Championship results ===
(key) (Races in bold indicate pole position; races in italics indicate fastest lap.)

Year	Team	Car	Class	1	2	3	4	5	6	7	8	9	10	11	12	DC	Pts	Class
1977	John Brundle Motors Ltd	Toyota Celica GT	B	SIL	BRH	OUL; Ret†	THR	SIL ?	THR; Ret†	DON; 4†	SIL; 15	DON; Ret†	BRH ?	THR	BRH; 9	?	?	4th
1978	John Brundle Motors Ltd	Toyota Celica GT	B	SIL ?	OUL; 2†	THR ?	BRH; 4†	SIL; 4†	DON; 5†	MAL; 4†	BRH ?	DON; 5†	BRH ?	THR ?	OUL; DNS†	7th	?	**3rd**
1979	Team Toyota GB / Hughes of Beaconsfield	Toyota Celica GT	B	SIL	OUL	THR	SIL	DON	SIL	MAL	DON	BRH	THR	SNE; 10	OUL; 3†	?	?	?
1980	Team Toyota GB / Hughes of Beaconsfield	Toyota Celica GT	B	MAL	OUL	THR	SIL	SIL	BRH	MAL	BRH; 13	THR ?	SIL			NC	18	NC
1981	TWR Team BP	Audi 80 GLE	B	MAL; 2†	SIL; 6	OUL; 12†	THR ?	**BRH**; Ret†	SIL; Ret	SIL; Ret	DON; 4†	BRH; DSQ	THR; 10	SIL; Ret		15th	30	4th
1983	Unipart with Daily Express	MG Metro Turbo	B	SIL	OUL	THR	BRH	THR	SIL	DON	SIL	DON	BRH	SIL; 19		31st	2	8th

† Events with 2 races staged for the different classes.

=== Complete British Formula 3 results ===
(key) (Races in bold indicate pole position) (Races in italics indicate fastest lap)

Year	Entrant	Engine	1	2	3	4	5	6	7	8	9	10	11	12	13	14	15	16	17	18	19	20	DC	Pts
1982	David Price Racing	Volkswagen	SIL; 2	THR; 17	SIL; 3	DON	**THR**; 15	MAL; 15	SNE; 4	SIL; 6	CAD; 4	SIL; 3	BRH; 5	MAL; 12	OUL; 9	BRH; 2	**SIL**; 14	SNE; 4	**OUL**; 1	**SIL**; 19	**BRH**; 2	**THR**; 1	4th	60
1983	Eddie Jordan Racing	Toyota	SIL; 2	THR; 2	SIL; 2	DON; 2	THR; 2	SIL; 3	THR; 2	BRH; 2	SIL; 2	**SIL^{1}** 1	CAD; 1	**SNE**; 1	SIL; 2	DON; 1	**OUL**; Ret	SIL; 2	OUL; 1	THR; 1	SIL; 1	THR (3)	**2nd**	**123**

^1 Brundle was ineligible to score points as he was using European specification tyres. Allen Berg therefore secured maximum points at this round.

=== Complete European Touring Car Championship results ===
(key) (Races in bold indicate pole position) (Races in italics indicate fastest lap)

Year	Team	Car	1	2	3	4	5	6	7	8	9	10	11	12	13	14	DC	Points
1983	(United Kingdom) Tom Walkinshaw Racing	Jaguar XJ-S	MNZ	VAL	DON; 1†	PER	MUG	BRN	**ZEL**; 1†	NUR	SAL	SPA; Ret	SIL	ZOL; 8			NC	0
1984	(United Kingdom) Tom Walkinshaw Racing	Jaguar XJ-S	MNZ; 13	VAL	DON	**PER**; 1†	BRN	ZEL	SAL	NUR	SPA	SIL	ZOL	MUG; 5†/Ret			NC	0
1985	(United Kingdom) TWR Bastos Texaco Racing Team	Rover Vitesse	MNZ	VAL	DON	AND	BRN	ZEL	SAL	NUR	SPA; Ret	SIL	NOG	ZOL	EST	JAR	NC	0

† Not eligible for points.

=== Complete Formula One results ===
(key)

Year	Entrant	Chassis	Engine	1	2	3	4	5	6	7	8	9	10	11	12	13	14	15	16	17	WDC	Pts
1984	Tyrrell Racing Organisation	Tyrrell 012	Ford Cosworth DFY 3.0 V8	BRA; DSQ	RSA; DSQ	BEL; DSQ	SMR; DSQ	FRA; DSQ	MON; DNQ	CAN; DSQ	DET; DSQ	DAL; DNQ	GBR	GER	AUT	NED	ITA	EUR	POR		NC^{1}	0
1985	Tyrrell Team	Tyrrell 012	Ford Cosworth DFY 3.0 V8	BRA; 8	POR; Ret	SMR; 9	MON; 10	CAN; 12	DET; Ret			GER; 10	AUT; DNQ								NC	0
1985	Tyrrell Team	Tyrrell 014	Renault EF4B 1.5 V6t							FRA; Ret	GBR; 7			NED; 7	ITA; 8	BEL; 13	EUR; Ret	RSA; 7	AUS; NC		NC	0
1986	Data General Team Tyrrell	Tyrrell 014	Renault EF4B 1.5 V6t	BRA; 5	ESP; Ret	SMR; 8															11th	8
1986	Data General Team Tyrrell	Tyrrell 015	Renault EF4B 1.5 V6t				MON; Ret	BEL; Ret	CAN; 9	DET; Ret	FRA; 10	GBR; 5	GER; Ret	HUN; 6	AUT; Ret	ITA; 10	POR; Ret	MEX; 11	AUS; 4		11th	8
1987	West Zakspeed Racing	Zakspeed 861	Zakspeed 1500/4 1.5 L4t	BRA; Ret				DET; Ret													18th	2
1987	West Zakspeed Racing	Zakspeed 871	Zakspeed 1500/4 1.5 L4t		SMR; 5	BEL; Ret	MON; 7		FRA; Ret	GBR; NC	GER; NC	HUN; Ret	AUT; DSQ	ITA; Ret	POR; Ret	ESP; 11	MEX; Ret	JPN; Ret	AUS; Ret		18th	2
1988	Canon Williams Team	Williams FW12	Judd CV 3.5 V8	BRA	SMR	MON	MEX	CAN	DET	FRA	GBR	GER	HUN	BEL; 7	ITA	POR	ESP	JPN	AUS		NC	0
1989	Motor Racing Developments	Brabham BT58	Judd EV 3.5 V8	BRA; Ret	SMR; Ret	MON; 6	MEX; 9	USA; Ret	CAN; DNPQ	FRA; DNPQ	GBR; Ret	GER; 8	HUN; 12	BEL; Ret	ITA; 6	POR; 8	ESP; Ret	JPN; 5	AUS; Ret		20th	4
1991	Brabham Yamaha F1 Team	Brabham BT59Y	Yamaha OX99 3.5 V12	USA; 11	BRA; 12																15th	2
1991	Brabham Yamaha F1 Team	Brabham BT60Y	Yamaha OX99 3.5 V12			SMR; 11	MON; EX	CAN; Ret	MEX; Ret	FRA; Ret	GBR; Ret	GER; 11	HUN; Ret	BEL; 9	ITA; 13	POR; 12	ESP; 10	JPN; 5	AUS; DNQ		15th	2
1992	Camel Benetton Ford	Benetton B191B	Ford HBA5 3.5 V8	RSA; Ret	MEX; Ret	BRA; Ret															6th	38
1992	Camel Benetton Ford	Benetton B192	Ford HBA7 3.5 V8				ESP; Ret	SMR; 4	MON; 5	CAN; Ret	FRA; 3	GBR; 3	GER; 4	HUN; 5	BEL; 4	ITA; 2	POR; 4	JPN; 3	AUS; 3		6th	38
1993	Ligier Gitanes Blondes	Ligier JS39	Renault RS5 3.5 V10	RSA; Ret	BRA; Ret	EUR; Ret	SMR; 3	ESP; Ret	MON; 6	CAN; 5	FRA; 5	GBR; 14^{†}	GER; 8	HUN; 5	BEL; 7	ITA; Ret	POR; 6	JPN; 9^{†}	AUS; 6		7th	13
1994	Marlboro McLaren Peugeot	McLaren MP4/9	Peugeot A6 3.5 V10	BRA; Ret	PAC; Ret	SMR; 8	MON; 2	ESP; 11^{†}	CAN; Ret	FRA; Ret	GBR; Ret	GER; Ret	HUN; 4^{†}	BEL; Ret	ITA; 5	POR; 6	EUR; Ret	JPN; Ret	AUS; 3		7th	16
1995	Ligier Gitanes Blondes	Ligier JS41	Mugen-Honda MF-301 3.0 V10	BRA	ARG	SMR	ESP; 9	MON; Ret	CAN; 10^{†}	FRA; 4	GBR; Ret	GER	HUN; Ret	BEL; 3	ITA; Ret	POR; 8	EUR; 7	PAC	JPN	AUS; Ret	13th	7
1996	Benson & Hedges Total Jordan Peugeot	Jordan 196	Peugeot A12 EV5 3.0 V10	AUS; Ret	BRA; 12^{†}	ARG; Ret	EUR; 6	SMR; Ret	MON; Ret	ESP; Ret	CAN; 6	FRA; 8	GBR; 6	GER; 10	HUN; Ret	BEL; Ret	ITA; 4	POR; 9	JPN; 5		11th	8

Notes

- **^1** – Tyrrell were disqualified from the entire world championship for 1984 due to a technical infringement.
- ^{†} Did not finish, but was classified as he had completed more than 90% of the race distance.

=== Complete World Sportscar Championship results ===
(key) (Races in bold indicate pole position) (Races in italics indicate fastest lap)

Year	Entrant	Class	Chassis	Engine	1	2	3	4	5	6	7	8	9	10	11	DC	Points
1985	TWR Jaguar	C1	Jaguar XJR-6	Jaguar 6.2 V12	MUG	MNZ	SIL	LMS	HOC	MOS; 3	SPA; 5	BRH	FUJ	SHA		42nd	8
1986	Silk Cut Jaguar	C1	Jaguar XJR-6	Jaguar 6.5 V12	MNZ	SIL	LMS	NOR	BRH	JER; Ret	NÜR	SPA	FUJ			NC	0
1987	Silk Cut Jaguar	C1	Jaguar XJR-8	Jaguar 7.0 V12	JAR	JER	MNZ	MNZ; Ret	LMS; Ret	NOR	BRH	NÜR	SPA; 1	FUJ		25th	20
1988	Silk Cut Jaguar	C1	Jaguar XJR-9	Jaguar 7.0 V12	JER; Ret	JAR; 1	MNZ; 1	SIL; 1	LMS; Ret	BRN; 2	BRH; 1	NÜR; 2	SPA; 2	FUJ; 1	SAN; 3	1st	240
1990	Silk Cut Jaguar	C	Jaguar XJR-11	Jaguar JV6 3.5 V6 t	SUZ; Ret	MNZ; 3	SIL; 1	SPA; Ret	DIJ; 5	NÜR; 3	DON; DSQ	CGV; 15	**MEX**; Ret			6th	19
1991	Silk Cut Jaguar	C	Jaguar XJR-14	Jaguar HB 3.5 V8	SUZ; Ret	**MNZ**; 1	**SIL**; 3	LMS	NÜR	MAG	MEX	AUT				17th	12

=== Complete 24 Hours of Le Mans results ===
Year	Team	Co-Drivers	Car	Class	Laps	Pos.	Class Pos.
1987	(United Kingdom) Silk Cut Jaguar (United Kingdom) Tom Walkinshaw Racing	(Denmark) John Nielsen	Jaguar XJR-8LM	C1	231	DNF	DNF
1988	(United Kingdom) Silk Cut Jaguar (United Kingdom) Tom Walkinshaw Racing	(Denmark) John Nielsen	Jaguar XJR-9LM	C1	306	DNF	DNF
1990*	(United Kingdom) Silk Cut Jaguar (United Kingdom) Tom Walkinshaw Racing	(France) Alain Ferté (United Kingdom) David Leslie	Jaguar XJR-12	C1	220	DNF	DNF
1990*	(United Kingdom) Silk Cut Jaguar (United Kingdom) Tom Walkinshaw Racing	(Denmark) John Nielsen (United States) Price Cobb	Jaguar XJR-12	C1	359	**1st**	**1st**
1997	(Japan) Nissan Motorsport (United Kingdom) TWR	(Germany) Jörg Müller (South Africa) Wayne Taylor	Nissan R390 GT1	GT1	139	DNF	DNF
1998	(Japan) Toyota Motorsports (Germany) Toyota Team Europe	(France) Emmanuel Collard (France) Éric Hélary	Toyota GT-One	GT1	191	DNF	DNF
1999	(Japan) Toyota Motorsports (Germany) Toyota Team Europe	(France) Emmanuel Collard (Italy) Vincenzo Sospiri	Toyota GT-One	LMGTP	90	DNF	DNF
2001	(United Kingdom) Team Bentley	(France) Stéphane Ortelli (United Kingdom) Guy Smith	Bentley EXP Speed 8	LMGTP	56	DNF	DNF
2012	(United Kingdom) Greaves Motorsport	(Spain) Lucas Ordóñez (United Kingdom) Alex Brundle	Zytek Z11SN-Nissan	LMP2	340	15th	8th

- After electrical problems with his own car, Brundle replaced Eliseo Salazar in the Jaguar #3 car en route to victory.

=== Complete WRC results ===
Year	Entrant	Car	1	2	3	4	5	6	7	8	9	10	11	12	13	14	Pos	Points
1999	Toyota Castrol Team	Toyota Corolla WRC	MON	SWE	KEN	POR	ESP	FRA	ARG	GRC	NZL	FIN	CHN	ITA	AUS	GBR; Ret	NC	0

Sporting positions
Preceded by Raul Boesel	World Sportscar Championship; Champion; 1988	Succeeded by Jean-Louis Schlesser
Preceded by Jochen Mass; Manuel Reuter; Stanley Dickens	Winner of the 24 Hours of Le Mans; 1990; With: John Nielsen; Price Cobb	Succeeded by Volker Weidler; Johnny Herbert; Bertrand Gachot
Awards and achievements
Preceded by Tommy Byrne	Autosport; National Racing Driver of the Year; 1983	Succeeded by Johnny Dumfries
Preceded by Jonathan Palmer	Autosport; British Competition Driver of the Year; 1988	Succeeded by Nigel Mansell
Preceded by Nigel Mansell	Autosport; British Competition Driver of the Year; 1990	Succeeded by Nigel Mansell
Preceded by None	RTS Television Sport Awards; Best Sports Pundit; 1998–1999	Succeeded by Alan Hansen
Preceded by John Francome	RTS Television Sport Awards; Best Sports Pundit; 2005–2006	Succeeded by Incumbent
