= 1983 British Formula Three Championship =

Motorsport championship

1983 British Formula 3 International Series

Seasons
- ← 1982 1984 →

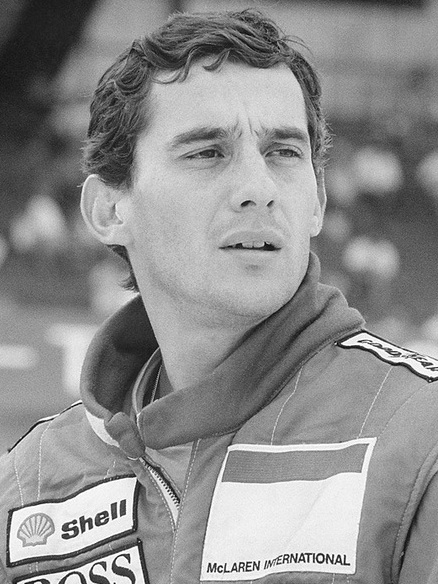
1983 champion, Ayrton Senna

The 1983 British Formula Three Championship was the 33rd season of the British Formula Three Championship, starting at Silverstone on 6 March and concluding at Thruxton on 23 October after 20 races.

The season saw a head-to-head title battle between future Formula One stars Ayrton Senna and Martin Brundle - both driving Toyota-powered Ralt chassis, prepared by West Surrey Racing and Eddie Jordan Racing respectively. Senna built up a commanding advantage by winning the first nine races in succession, but a series of retirements for the Brazilian later in the year allowed Brundle to close the gap. The Brit took the points lead heading into the series finale, but Senna dominated the race to secure the title.

Senna won 12 of the 20 races in the season (60% of that year's races), a record until Jan Magnussen won 14 of the 18 races in the 1994 season (78% of that year's races). Both Senna and Brundle stepped up to F1 in 1984, joining Toleman and Tyrrell respectively.

Other notable drivers from the year included future Le Mans winner Davy Jones, BTCC star David Leslie and Senna's future Lotus teammate Johnny Dumfries. 1983 was also the final season before 'Class B' was established, offering a separate prize for those competing in older cars.

== Race calendar and results ==
Round	Circuit	Date	Pole position	Fastest lap	Winning driver	Winning team
1	(United Kingdom) Silverstone	6 March	(United Kingdom) David Leslie	(Brazil) Ayrton Senna	(Brazil) Ayrton Senna	(United Kingdom) West Surrey Racing
2	(United Kingdom) Thruxton	13 March	(Brazil) Ayrton Senna	(United Kingdom) Martin Brundle	(Brazil) Ayrton Senna	(United Kingdom) West Surrey Racing
3	(United Kingdom) Silverstone	20 March	(Brazil) Ayrton Senna	(Brazil) Ayrton Senna	(Brazil) Ayrton Senna	(United Kingdom) West Surrey Racing
4	(United Kingdom) Donington Park	27 March	(Brazil) Ayrton Senna	(Brazil) Ayrton Senna (United States) Davy Jones	(Brazil) Ayrton Senna	(United Kingdom) West Surrey Racing
5	(United Kingdom) Thruxton	4 April	(Brazil) Ayrton Senna	(United Kingdom) Martin Brundle	(Brazil) Ayrton Senna	(United Kingdom) West Surrey Racing
6	(United Kingdom) Silverstone	24 April	(Brazil) Ayrton Senna	(Brazil) Ayrton Senna	(Brazil) Ayrton Senna	(United Kingdom) West Surrey Racing
7	(United Kingdom) Thruxton	2 May	(Brazil) Ayrton Senna	(Brazil) Ayrton Senna	(Brazil) Ayrton Senna	(United Kingdom) West Surrey Racing
8	(United Kingdom) Brands Hatch	8 May	(Brazil) Ayrton Senna	(Brazil) Ayrton Senna	(Brazil) Ayrton Senna	(United Kingdom) West Surrey Racing
9	(United Kingdom) Silverstone	30 May	(Brazil) Ayrton Senna	(Brazil) Ayrton Senna	(Brazil) Ayrton Senna	(United Kingdom) West Surrey Racing
10	(United Kingdom) Silverstone	12 June	(United Kingdom) Martin Brundle	(United States) Davy Jones	(United Kingdom) Martin Brundle^{1}	(Republic of Ireland) Eddie Jordan Racing
11	(United Kingdom) Cadwell Park	19 June	(Brazil) Ayrton Senna	(United Kingdom) Martin Brundle	(United Kingdom) Martin Brundle	(Republic of Ireland) Eddie Jordan Racing
12	(United Kingdom) Snetterton	3 July	(United Kingdom) Martin Brundle	(Brazil) Ayrton Senna	(United Kingdom) Martin Brundle	(Republic of Ireland) Eddie Jordan Racing
13	(United Kingdom) Silverstone	16 July	(Brazil) Ayrton Senna	(Brazil) Ayrton Senna	(Brazil) Ayrton Senna	(United Kingdom) West Surrey Racing
14	(United Kingdom) Donington Park	24 July	(Brazil) Ayrton Senna	(Brazil) Ayrton Senna	(United Kingdom) Martin Brundle	(Republic of Ireland) Eddie Jordan Racing
15	(United Kingdom) Oulton Park	6 August	(United Kingdom) Martin Brundle	(Brazil) Ayrton Senna	(United Kingdom) Calvin Fish	(United Kingdom) David Price Racing
16	(United Kingdom) Silverstone	29 August	(Brazil) Ayrton Senna	(United States) Davy Jones	(Brazil) Ayrton Senna	(United Kingdom) West Surrey Racing
17	(United Kingdom) Oulton Park	11 September	(Brazil) Ayrton Senna	(United States) Davy Jones	(United Kingdom) Martin Brundle	(Republic of Ireland) Eddie Jordan Racing
18	(United Kingdom) Thruxton	18 September	(Brazil) Ayrton Senna	(United Kingdom) Martin Brundle	(United Kingdom) Martin Brundle	(Republic of Ireland) Eddie Jordan Racing
19	(United Kingdom) Silverstone	2 October	(United States) Davy Jones	(United Kingdom) Martin Brundle	(United Kingdom) Martin Brundle	(Republic of Ireland) Eddie Jordan Racing
20	(United Kingdom) Thruxton	23 October	(Brazil) Ayrton Senna	(Brazil) Ayrton Senna	(Brazil) Ayrton Senna	(United Kingdom) West Surrey Racing

^1 Brundle was ineligible to score points as he was using European specification tyres. Allen Berg therefore secured maximum points at this round.

== Championship Standings ==
Points in brackets include dropped scores – only the best 17 of 20 scores count towards the championship

Pos.	Driver	Team	SIL	THR	SIL	DON	THR	SIL	THR	BRH	SIL	SIL^{2}	CAD	SNE	SIL	DON	OUL	SIL	OUL	THR	SIL	THR	Pts
1	(Brazil) Ayrton Senna	West Surrey Racing	1	1	1	1	1	1	1	1	1	Ret	DNS	Ret	1	2	Ret	1	Ret	Ret	2	1	132
2	(United Kingdom) Martin Brundle	Eddie Jordan Racing	2	2	2	2	2	3	2	2	2	1	1	1	2	1	Ret	2	1	1	1	(3)	123
3	(United States) Davy Jones	Murray Taylor Racing	3	Ret	4	3	Ret	2	3	3	5	14	3	2	7	3	2	3	Ret	2	3	2	77
4	(United Kingdom) Calvin Fish	David Price Racing	4	Ret	3	Ret	3	4	Ret	4	4	16	2	3	3	4	1	5	2	3	4	5	67
5	(Canada) Allen Berg	Neil Trundle Racing	10	8	7	Ret	5	7	6	5	3	10	Ret	Ret	4	Ret	3	4	5	Ret	5	DNS	32
6	(Switzerland) Mario Hytten	Axxess Racing Team	5	3	Ret	4	4	8	4	Ret	7	Ret	5	5	6	9					7	4	23
7	(United Kingdom) David Leslie	Robinson Motorsport	7	4	5	6	Ret	6	5	6	Ret	Ret		Ret	8	6	4	Ret	3	4	6		22
8	(United States) Eric Lang	Murray Taylor Racing	12	Ret	Ret	Ret	10	13	9	11	8	17	4	6	9	7	Ret	11	6	6	15	6	10
9	(United Kingdom) Tony Trevor	Driver	8		6	Ret	8	9	8	8	9	19	6	4	Ret	8	5	7	7		12		9
10	(United Kingdom) Richard Trott	Richard Trott Racing			Ret	5	DNS	Ret		DNS	6	12				5			4	Ret			8
11	(United Kingdom) Johnny Dumfries	Associated Racing	6	5	Ret	8	7	5	Ret	Ret	Ret	Ret		DNS	5		Ret	6			16		8
12	(United Kingdom) David Hunt	Eddie Jordan Racing																9	9	5	Ret	7	2
13	(United Kingdom) Tim Lee-Davey	David Luff Racing	9	6	12	Ret	6	10	7	7		22			10			8			11		2
14	(United Kingdom) Mike Blanchet	Tarry Racing	10					17	10	9		21		DNS	12		Ret				10	8	1
15	(Jamaica) Carlton Tingling	Tingling Racing	14	DNS	11	Ret	12	14	DNS	10	10	23		Ret	13	10	6	Ret	8	7	13	9	1

^2 European Championship race where the British runners had to use regulation Avon rubber to be eligible for British championship points.
