= 1985 French Grand Prix =

- Race 7 of 16 in the 1985 Formula One World Championship
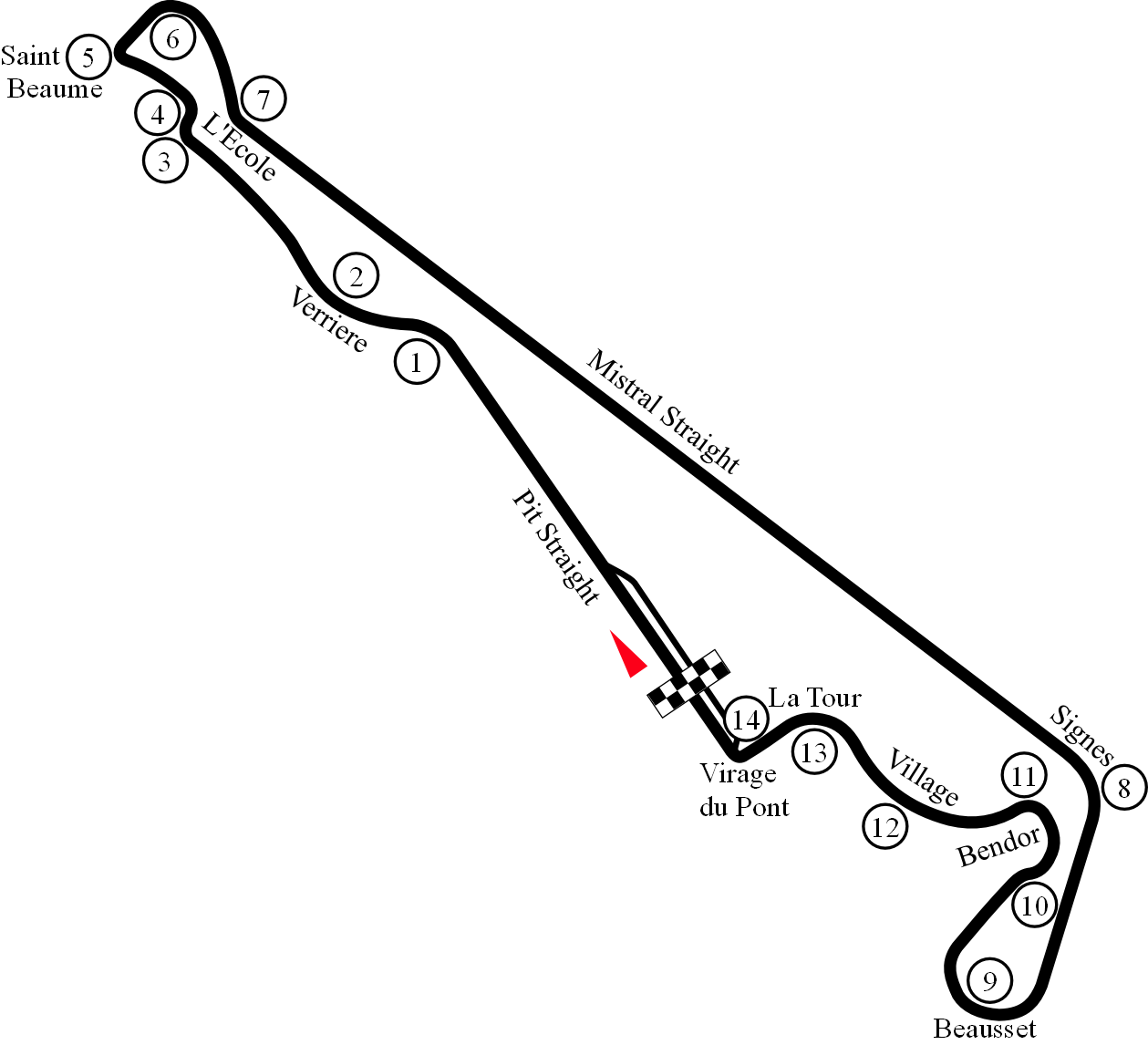

Race details
- Date: 7 July 1985
- Official name: 71e Grand Prix de France
- Location: Circuit Paul Ricard; Le Castellet, Var, France
- Course: Permanent racing facility
- Course length: 5.810 km (3.610 miles)
- Distance: 53 laps, 307.928 km (191.338 miles)
- Weather: Dry, hot

Pole position
Driver	(Finland) Keke Rosberg	Williams-Honda
- Time: 1:32.462

Fastest lap
Driver	(Finland) Keke Rosberg	Williams-Honda
- Time: 1:39.914 on lap 46

Podium
First	(Brazil) Nelson Piquet	Brabham-BMW
Second	(Finland) Keke Rosberg	Williams-Honda
Third	(France) Alain Prost	McLaren-TAG

The 1985 French Grand Prix was a Formula One motor race held at Paul Ricard on 7 July 1985. It was the seventh race of the 1985 Formula One World Championship. It was the 63rd French Grand Prix and the ninth to be held at Paul Ricard. The race was held over 53 laps of the 5.81-kilometre (3.61 mi) circuit for a total race distance of 307.93 kilometres (191.34 mi).

The race was won by Brazilian driver Nelson Piquet, driving a Brabham-BMW, his only victory of the season. It was the 35th and final Formula One victory for the Brabham team, as well as the first F1 victory for Italian tyre manufacturer Pirelli since 1957. Finn Keke Rosberg finished second in a Williams-Honda, having started from pole position, with local driver Alain Prost third in a McLaren-TAG. Prost moved to within five points of Drivers' Championship leader, Italian Michele Alboreto, who retired on lap 6 with a turbo failure in his Ferrari.

This was to be the last French Grand Prix held on the full Paul Ricard circuit until 2018. A shorter, 3.813-kilometre (2.369 mi) circuit would be used from 1986 until 1990, following Elio de Angelis's fatal accident during a test session in May 1986.

== Qualifying report ==
Qualifying saw Keke Rosberg take pole position in his Williams-Honda with a time of 1:32.462, averaging 140.561 mph (226.211 km/h), with Ayrton Senna alongside him on the front row in his Lotus-Renault. On the second row were Michele Alboreto in the Ferrari and Alain Prost in the McLaren, and on the third were Nelson Piquet in the Brabham and Niki Lauda in the second McLaren. Completing the top ten were Elio de Angelis in the second Lotus, Gerhard Berger in the Arrows, and the two factory Renaults of Patrick Tambay and Derek Warwick, Tambay driving a 'B' specification of the RE60.

Rosberg's Williams teammate, Nigel Mansell, had set a time good enough for eighth on the grid when he had a high-speed crash at the Signes corner, located at the end of the 1.8-kilometre (1.1 mi) long Mistral Straight. A puncture caused the car to plunge off the track at over 200 mph (322 km/h) and into catch fencing; one of the poles struck Mansell on the head, giving him a concussion which forced him to miss the race.

The race was also the first in which the Tyrrell team used Renault turbo engines, thus becoming the last F1 team to go over from naturally aspirated engines to turbos. However, only Martin Brundle drove the new Renault-powered 014 car, while teammate Stefan Bellof continued to use the Cosworth-powered 012. Brundle could only qualify 20th, but was still over four seconds faster than Bellof in 25th. After qualifying, Brundle described one lap coming onto the Mistral about 50 metres behind Bellof in the Cosworth car (with Bellof also on a quick lap), and by the time the 014 got to Signes, the older car was just a dot in his mirror. While only running the oldest and slowest of the available Renault turbo engines (the Renault EF4 turbo was putting out around 800 bhp (597 kW), which was a significant upgrade on the 540 bhp (403 kW) from the Cosworth), Brundle was speed trapped at 310 km/h (193 mph), significantly faster than Bellof in the non-turbo who could only reach 278 km/h (173 mph).

During qualifying, Marc Surer in his Brabham BMW recorded a seasons high 335 km/h (208 mph) on the 1.8 km (1.1 mi) long Mistral Straight.

=== Qualifying classification ===
Pos	No	Driver	Constructor	Q1	Q2	Gap
1	6	(Finland) Keke Rosberg	Williams-Honda	1:33.484	1:32.462	
2	12	(Brazil) Ayrton Senna	Lotus-Renault	1:32.835	1:33.677	+0.373
3	27	(Italy) Michele Alboreto	Ferrari	1:35.421	1:33.267	+0.805
4	2	(France) Alain Prost	McLaren-TAG	1:33.547	1:33.335	+0.873
5	7	(Brazil) Nelson Piquet	Brabham-BMW	1:33.981	1:33.812	+1.350
6	1	(Austria) Niki Lauda	McLaren-TAG	1:33.860	1:34.166	+1.398
7	11	(Italy) Elio de Angelis	Lotus-Renault	1:34.022	1:34.227	+1.560
8	5	(United Kingdom) Nigel Mansell	Williams-Honda	1:34.191	n/a	+1.729
9	17	(Austria) Gerhard Berger	Arrows-BMW	1:34.674	1:37.445	+2.212
10	15	(France) Patrick Tambay	Renault	1:34.680	1:36.339	+2.218
11	16	(United Kingdom) Derek Warwick	Renault	1:34.976	1:35.190	+2.514
12	18	(Belgium) Thierry Boutsen	Arrows-BMW	1:36.051	1:35.488	+3.026
13	25	(Italy) Andrea de Cesaris	Ligier-Renault	1:37.335	1:35.571	+3.109
14	8	(Switzerland) Marc Surer	Brabham-BMW	1:35.572	1:35.640	+3.110
15	26	(France) Jacques Laffite	Ligier-Renault	1:38.173	1:36.133	+3.671
16	28	(Sweden) Stefan Johansson	Ferrari	1:37.546	1:36.140	+3.678
17	22	(Italy) Riccardo Patrese	Alfa Romeo	1:36.729	1:38.745	+4.267
18	23	(United States) Eddie Cheever	Alfa Romeo	1:36.931	1:38.489	+4.469
19	19	(Italy) Teo Fabi	Toleman-Hart	1:37.142	1:37.657	+4.680
20	9	(West Germany) Manfred Winkelhock	RAM-Hart	1:37.654	1:45.628	+5.192
21	3	(United Kingdom) Martin Brundle	Tyrrell-Renault	1:40.486	1:40.015	+7.553
22	30	(United Kingdom) Jonathan Palmer	Zakspeed	1:40.647	1:40.289	+7.827
23	10	(France) Philippe Alliot	RAM-Hart	1:41.647	1:44.221	+9.185
24	24	(Italy) Piercarlo Ghinzani	Osella-Alfa Romeo	1:42.136	1:42.968	+9.674
25	29	(Italy) Pierluigi Martini	Minardi-Motori Moderni	1:47.523	1:44.350	+11.888
26	4	(West Germany) Stefan Bellof	Tyrrell-Ford	1:44.404	1:45.478	+11.942

== Race report ==
At the start, Rosberg led away from Senna and Piquet, while Prost slipped to eighth. The early laps saw both Ligiers retire, Jacques Laffite suffering a turbo failure on lap 3 and Andrea de Cesaris dropping out with steering problems two laps later. Alboreto also suffered a turbo failure on lap 6 while running fourth.

On lap 7, Piquet overtook compatriot Senna on the Mistral Straight. He then closed up to Rosberg, who was struggling for grip, before passing him for the lead at Beausset on lap 11. At the same time, Lauda and Prost moved up to third and fourth respectively, ahead of de Angelis. On lap 21, Berger collided with the Minardi of Pierluigi Martini, putting both drivers out.

Senna, who had dropped down the order due to gearbox problems, retired in dramatic fashion on lap 27, when his engine failed and oil from it leaked onto his rear tyres, causing him to spin off backwards into the catch fencing and crash massively at Signes. He escaped with bruises, while his Lotus caught fire. Lauda retired on lap 31 when his own gearbox failed, promoting Prost to third; Brundle also suffered a gearbox failure on lap 33.

On lap 38, by which time Piquet had extended his lead to over 20 seconds, Prost overtook Rosberg for second at the Verrerie bends. The Finn promptly pitted for new tyres, emerging in fourth behind de Angelis. He then made a charge, quickly passing the Lotus and setting the fastest lap of the race on lap 46, before retaking second from Prost on the final lap.

Up front, Piquet cruised to victory, taking the chequered flag 6.6 seconds ahead of Rosberg. Prost finished 44 seconds ahead of the second Ferrari of Stefan Johansson, who passed de Angelis for fourth on the final lap, with Tambay taking the final point for sixth.

=== Race classification ===
Pos	No	Driver	Constructor	Laps	Time/Retired	Grid	Points
1	7	(Brazil) Nelson Piquet	Brabham-BMW	53	1:31:46.266	5	9
2	6	(Finland) Keke Rosberg	Williams-Honda	53	+ 6.660	1	6
3	2	(France) Alain Prost	McLaren-TAG	53	+ 9.285	4	4
4	28	(Sweden) Stefan Johansson	Ferrari	53	+ 53.491	15	3
5	11	(Italy) Elio de Angelis	Lotus-Renault	53	+ 53.690	7	2
6	15	(France) Patrick Tambay	Renault	53	+ 1:15.167	9	1
7	16	(United Kingdom) Derek Warwick	Renault	53	+ 1:44.212	10	
8	8	(Switzerland) Marc Surer	Brabham-BMW	52	+ 1 lap	13	
9	18	(Belgium) Thierry Boutsen	Arrows-BMW	52	+ 1 lap	11	
10	23	(United States) Eddie Cheever	Alfa Romeo	52	+ 1 lap	17	
11	22	(Italy) Riccardo Patrese	Alfa Romeo	52	+ 1 lap	16	
12	9	(West Germany) Manfred Winkelhock	RAM-Hart	50	+ 3 laps	19	
13	4	(West Germany) Stefan Bellof	Tyrrell-Ford	50	+ 3 laps	25	
14	19	(Italy) Teo Fabi	Toleman-Hart	49	Fuel system	18	
15	24	(Italy) Piercarlo Ghinzani	Osella-Alfa Romeo	49	+ 4 laps	23	
Ret	3	(United Kingdom) Martin Brundle	Tyrrell-Renault	32	Gearbox	20	
Ret	1	(Austria) Niki Lauda	McLaren-TAG	30	Gearbox	6	
Ret	12	(Brazil) Ayrton Senna	Lotus-Renault	26	Engine	2	
Ret	17	(Austria) Gerhard Berger	Arrows-BMW	20	Accident	8	
Ret	29	(Italy) Pierluigi Martini	Minardi-Motori Moderni	19	Accident	24	
Ret	10	(France) Philippe Alliot	RAM-Hart	8	Fuel system	22	
Ret	30	(United Kingdom) Jonathan Palmer	Zakspeed	6	Engine	21	
Ret	27	(Italy) Michele Alboreto	Ferrari	5	Turbo	3	
Ret	25	(Italy) Andrea de Cesaris	Ligier-Renault	4	Steering	12	
Ret	26	(France) Jacques Laffite	Ligier-Renault	2	Turbo	14	
DNS	5	(United Kingdom) Nigel Mansell	Williams-Honda		Driver injured		

== Championship standings after the race ==
Drivers' Championship standings

Pos	Driver	Points
1	(Italy) Michele Alboreto	31
2	(France) Alain Prost	26
3	(Italy) Elio de Angelis	26
4	(Finland) Keke Rosberg	18
5	(Sweden) Stefan Johansson	16

Constructors' Championship standings

Pos	Constructor	Points
1	(Italy) Ferrari	50
2	(United Kingdom) Lotus-Renault	35
3	(United Kingdom) McLaren-TAG	29
4	(United Kingdom) Williams-Honda	23
5	(France) Renault	13

- Note: Only the top five positions are included for both sets of standings.

Previous race: 1985 Detroit Grand Prix	FIA Formula One World Championship; 1985 season	Next race: 1985 British Grand Prix
Previous race: 1984 French Grand Prix	French Grand Prix	Next race: 1986 French Grand Prix
