= Ligier JS31 =

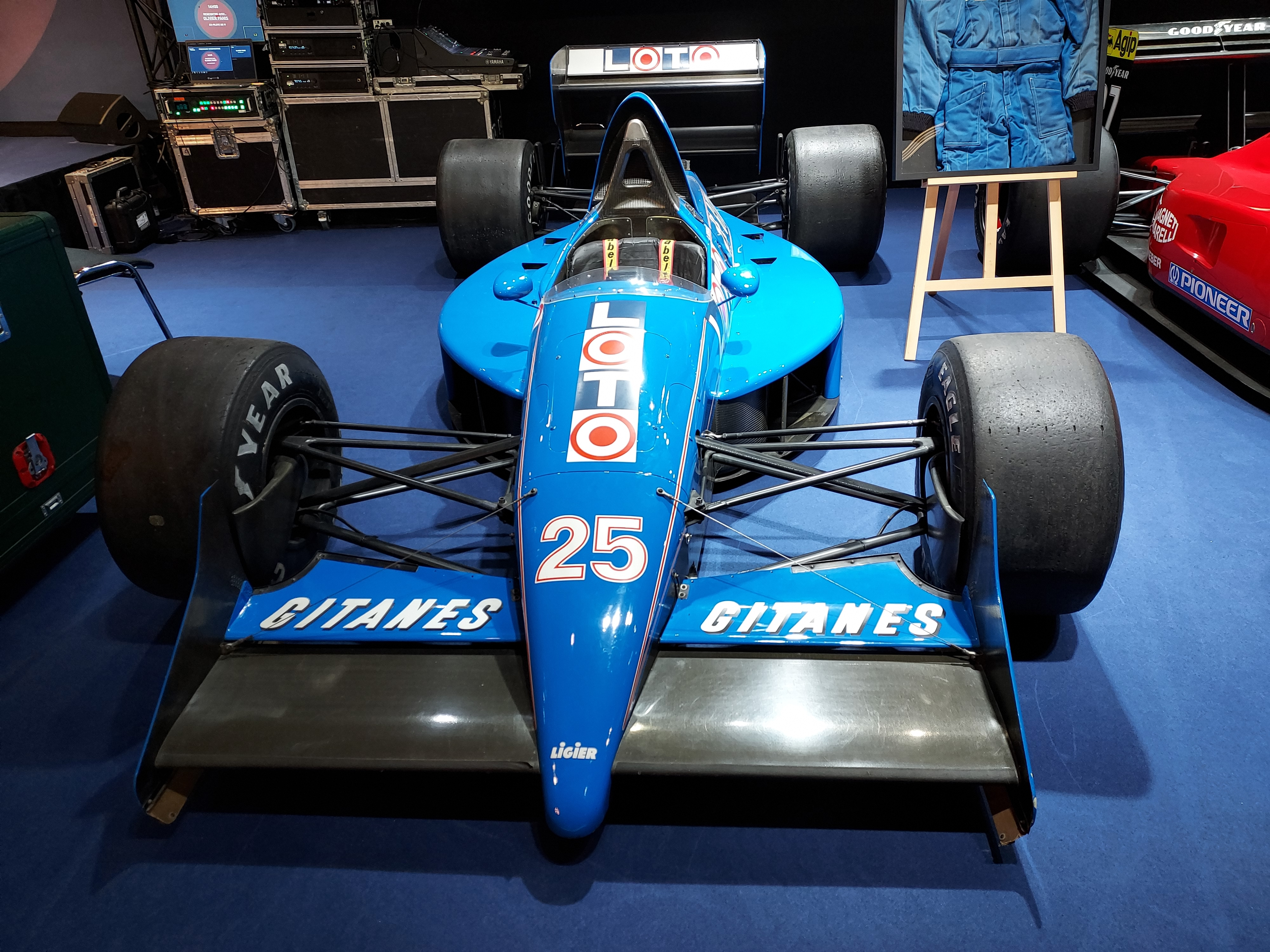
- Category: Formula One
- Constructor: Ligier
- Designers: Michel Têtu (Technical Director); Claude Galopin (Chief Designer); Michel Beaujon (Head of Design)
- Predecessor: JS29
- Successor: JS33

Technical specifications
- Chassis: Carbon fibre and kevlar monocoque
- Suspension (front): Double wishbones
- Suspension (rear): Double wishbones
- Axle track: Front: 1,790 mm (70 in); Rear: 1,662 mm (65.4 in)
- Wheelbase: 2,865 mm (112.8 in)
- Engine: Judd CV, 3,496 cc (213.3 cu in), V8, NA, mid-engine, longitudinally mounted
- Transmission: Ligier 6-speed manual
- Weight: 525 kg (1,157 lb)
- Fuel: Valvoline
- Tyres: Goodyear

Competition history
- Notable entrants: Ligier Loto
- Notable drivers: 25. (France) René Arnoux; 26. (Sweden) Stefan Johansson
- Debut: 1988 Brazilian Grand Prix
- Last event: 1988 Australian Grand Prix
| Races | Wins | Poles | F/Laps |
|---|---|---|---|
| 16 | 0 | 0 | 0 |
- Constructors' Championships: 0
- Drivers' Championships: 0

The Ligier JS31 was a Formula One car designed by Michel Têtu and Michel Beaujon for use by the Ligier team in the 1988 Formula One World Championship. The car was powered by the new, normally aspirated, 3.5-litre Judd CV V8 engine and ran on Goodyear tyres. It was driven by French veteran René Arnoux, in his third season with the team, and Swede Stefan Johansson, who joined from McLaren. Johansson joined the team late in the off-season in place of West German Christian Danner, who had originally signed to drive but was unable to fit in the car comfortably.

Many drivers were considered and held discussions with Ligier for the 1988 season. Among them were Philippe Streiff, Olivier Grouillard, Paolo Barilla and Michel Ferté.

The JS31 was the first non-turbo car produced by Ligier since the Cosworth DFV powered JS21 used in the 1983 season and it proved to be very uncompetitive. The car's major failure was a lack of downforce, with Johansson in particular reporting several times during a frustrating season that he had to drive the car as if on a wet track. Johansson, a frequent podium visitor in the previous three seasons, failed to qualify six times and never finished above 9th while seven-time Grand Prix winner Arnoux failed to qualify twice (San Marino and France) and never finished a race higher than 10th. Neither driver qualified for the San Marino Grand Prix, the first time in team history that neither of its cars made the grid.

The French Grand Prix at Paul Ricard proved to be the lowest point of the season for the French team. On the eve of Arnoux's 40th birthday (celebrated the day after the race), neither Arnoux nor Johansson qualified for the team's home Grand Prix, something that did not please the team's owner Guy Ligier.

Ligier did not score a point during 1988, their worst season since 1983, when they also failed to score. On several occasions both Johansson and Arnoux struggled to outqualify the equally uncompetitive EuroBrun. In an effort to optimise the weight distribution of the car, it was designed with an unusual and heavy arrangement of fuel tanks: there were two cells either side of the driver, another between the driver and the engine and a fourth between the engine and gearbox.

Ligier only had both cars qualify for a race on 10 occasions in 1988. On 5 of those occasions both cars failed to finish.

== Complete Formula One World Championship results ==
(key)

| Year | Team | Engine | Drivers | 1 | 2 | 3 | 4 | 5 | 6 | 7 | 8 | 9 | 10 | 11 | 12 | 13 | 14 | 15 | 16 | Pts. | WCC |
|---|---|---|---|---|---|---|---|---|---|---|---|---|---|---|---|---|---|---|---|---|---|
| 1988 | Ligier Loto | Judd CV V8 NA | | BRA | SMR | MON | MEX | CAN | DET | FRA | GBR | GER | HUN | BEL | ITA | POR | ESP | JPN | AUS | 0 | NC |
| 1988 | Ligier Loto | Judd CV V8 NA | (France) René Arnoux | Ret | DNQ | Ret | Ret | Ret | Ret | DNQ | 18 | 17 | Ret | Ret | 13 | 10 | Ret | 17 | Ret | 0 | NC |
| 1988 | Ligier Loto | Judd CV V8 NA | (Sweden) Stefan Johansson | 9 | DNQ | Ret | 10 | Ret | Ret | DNQ | DNQ | DNQ | Ret | 11† | DNQ | Ret | Ret | DNQ | 9† | 0 | NC |

† Driver did not finish the race, but were still classified as they completed at least 90% of the race distance.

== Sources ==
- Hodges, David (1990). A-Z of Formula Racing Cars 1945-1990. Bay View Books. ISBN 1-901432-17-3.
- Roebuck, Nigel, ed. (1989). Grand Prix World Championship 1988-89. Garry Sparke & Associates. ISBN 0-908081-59-6.
