= José Behra =

French racing driver (1924–1997)

- Born: Joseph Édouard Robert Christian Behra; 11 September 1924; Nice, France
- Died: 16 November 1997 (aged 73); Mougins, France
- Relatives: Jean Behra (brother); Éric Behra (adopted son); Jean-Paul Behra (nephew)

24 Hours of Le Mans career
- Years: 1957 – 1958, 1962
- Teams: L. Coulibeuf; North American Racing Team; Automobili O.S.C.A.
- Best finish: DNF (1957, 1958, 1962)
- Class wins: 0

José Behra (11 September 1924 – 16 November 1997) was a French racing driver and rally driver.

== Racing career ==
José Behra was the younger brother of Jean Behra. Similarly to Jean, he began his career racing motorcycles; Jean prepared a Terrot with which José scored his first three victories.

Behra partnered Georges Houel in the 1954 Giro d'Italia, a road rally held over 10 days and 5,763 km (3,581 mi). The pair drove an Alfa Romeo to tenth overall, second in class.

In 1955, Behra took part in the Monte Carlo Rally and two further rallies in Belgium. He entered the Mille Miglia and the Bol d'Or at Montlhéry but did not attend either race. He reunited with Houel to drive a Maserati A6GCS to 12th overall in the Supercortemaggiore Grand Prix at Monza Circuit, won by brother Jean and Luigi Musso in a faster Maserati 300S.

The pair raced an A6GCS in the 1956 Paris 1000 km at Montlhéry but did not finish; Jean won alongside Louis Rosier. José served as co-driver for Jean in the Tour de France, finishing fifth overall. He entered a Denzel for the GT+1.3 race at the Coupes du Salon but did not attend.

Behra entered two rounds of the 1957 World Sportscar Championship alongside Léon Coulibeuf, racing a Maserati 200S at Le Mans and Sverige but retiring from both; in the latter, he was pushed into a ditch by a spinning competitor. The same year, he drove with Christian Boulan to 22nd overall (4th in class) in the 12 Hours of Reims and was co-driver to Paco Godia in the Tour de France, taking 7th overall. At the Coupes du Salon, he placed sixth in the GT+1.3 race and 11th in the main event.

For the 1958 24 Hours of Le Mans, the North American Racing Team entered brothers Pedro and Ricardo Rodríguez in a Ferrari 500 TR. However, the ACO judged the 16-year-old Ricardo too young to compete and Behra replaced him. Behra and Pedro Rodríguez outlasted NART's other two entries but retired in the twelfth hour with a holed radiator. Behra drove a Porsche 356 to great success that year. He placed third in class in a 3-hour sportscar race supporting the Pau Grand Prix, 4th in the Coupes de Vitesse at Montlhéry, and reunited with Pedro Rodríguez to take second in class at the 12 Hours of Reims. Behra won his class alongside Pierre Marx at the Trophée d'Auvergne, a three-hour race at the Circuit de Charade, placed sixth with Stuart Lewis-Evans in the Tour de France, and capped off the season with another class win at the Coupes du Salon.

Behra began the 1959 season with fourth in class at the Coupes de Vitesse in his Porsche. He entered Le Mans in a 718 RSK but would not attend. Throughout the year, his brother would develop a Formula Two car under the Behra-Porsche marque. Jean was contracted to Scuderia Ferrari for 1959 but his relationship with the team was famously confrontational. While still a Ferrari driver, Jean entered one of his Porsches to the 1959 Monaco Grand Prix with Maria Teresa de Filippis at the wheel and José as a reserve entrant. De Filippis did not qualify for the event. Jean was fired from the Scuderia after the 1959 French Grand Prix; he entered his own car to the German Grand Prix but crashed fatally in the supporting sportscar race. José overcame the devastating loss of his brother and continued to race.

Behra raced a Jaguar Mk II throughout 1960. The year started strongly with victory in the Tourisme class and third overall in the Alpine Rally. He retired with an accident from the Trophée d'Auvergne, this year a 6-hour race, retired from the Liège–Rome–Liège "Road Marathon", placed fourth in class with motorcycle racer Pierre Monneret in the Tour de France, and finished 16th in the Tour de Corse.

1961 saw Behra claim his best finish in the Monte Carlo Rally with eighth place. In 1962, he retired from the 24 Hours of Le Mans with gearbox failure, and entered the Tour de France but did not compete. 1963 saw him co-pilot Jean Guichet to victory in the race, and the following year he drove to second in the GT1.0 class.

In 1965, Behra entered the Monte Carlo Rally and Critérium Neige et Glace but his result in either rally is unclear. He drove an NSU Prinz to 10th in the GT2.0 race at the Prix de Paris (Montlhéry) and to second in class in the Alpine Rally.

Behra was co-driver to Jean-François Piot in the 1969 Alpine Rally, but necessitated the pair's retirement when he fell ill during the event. The pair found better fortune by winning their class in that year's Tour de France.

Behra's final appearance in the Tour came in 1970 as co-driver to Jean-Claude Andruet in a Ligier JS1 sports prototype. This was the first race for the new car and both examples retired with engine troubles.

== Business interests ==
During the 1960s, Behra imported American cars to the Paris region in association with Guy Ligier. He moved to Puteaux in 1972 and became a Ford dealer there. He retired in 1990 and handed the dealership over to his adopted son Eric.

In 1968, Behra worked with Ligier and Jo Schlesser to form the Formula Two team Écurie Intersport SA, fielding two cars for Ligier and Schlesser in the 1968 European Formula Two Championship. The season came undone when Schlesser was killed during the 1968 French Grand Prix, upon which Ligier immediately retired as a driver and focused on building cars.

== Racing record ==
=== Complete 24 Hours of Le Mans results ===
Year	Team	Co-Drivers	Car	Class	Laps	Pos.	Class Pos.
1957	(France) L. Coulibeuf (private entrant)	(France) Léon Coulibeuf	Maserati 200S	S2.0	136	DNF (Fuel leak)	
1958	(United States) North American Racing Team	(Mexico) Pedro Rodríguez	Ferrari 500 TR	S2.0	119	DNF (Overheating)	
1962	(Italy) Automobili O.S.C.A.	(United States) George Arents	O.S.C.A. 1600 GT Zagato	E1.6	227	DNF (Gearbox)	

=== Complete 12 Hours of Reims results ===
Year	Team	Co-Drivers	Car	Class	Laps	Pos.	Class Pos.
1957		(France) Christian Boulan	Alfa Romeo 1900 Zagato	GT2.0		22nd	4th
1958		(Mexico) Pedro Rodríguez	Porsche 356A Carrera Coupe	GT2.0		9th	2nd

=== Complete Tour de France Automobile results ===
As driver

Year	Team	Co-Drivers	Car	Class	Pos.	Class Pos.
1958		(United Kingdom) Stuart Lewis-Evans	Porsche 356A Carrera Coupe	GT	6th	6th
1960		(France) Pierre Monneret	Jaguar Mk II	T	?	4th
1962			NSU		DNA	
1964	AGACI	(France) Pierre Landereau	NSU Prinz	GT1.0	34th	2nd

As co-driver

Year	Team	Driver	Car	Class	Pos.	Class Pos.
1956		(France) Jean Behra	Porsche 356A Carrera	?	5th	?
1957		(Spain) Paco Godia	Porsche 356A Carrera	GT	7th	7th
1963	(France) Jean Guichet (private entrant)	(France) Jean Guichet	Ferrari 250 GTO	GT	1st	1st
1969	Ford France - BP	(France) Jean-François Piot	Ford Capri 2300 RS	SpT+2.0	6th	1st
1970	(France) Ligier	(France) Jean-Claude Andruet	Ligier JS1	GTS/P	DNF (Engine)	

=== Complete Rallye de Monte Carlo results ===
Year	Team	Co-Drivers	Car	Pos.
1955		(France) Christian Soulan	DKW F91	15th
1958		(France) Roger Nathan-Murat	Citroën DS 19	DNF
1959		(France) Roger Nathan-Murat	Citroën ID 19	?
1961		(France) Jean Bergès	NSU Prinz Sport	8th
1963		(France) Jean-Paul Behra	NSU Prinz	77th
1964		(France) Pierre Landereau	NSU Prinz 4	DNF
1965		(France) Philippe Conso	NSU Prinz	?
