= Ligier JS29 =

Ligier JS29 Ligier JS29B Ligier JS29C
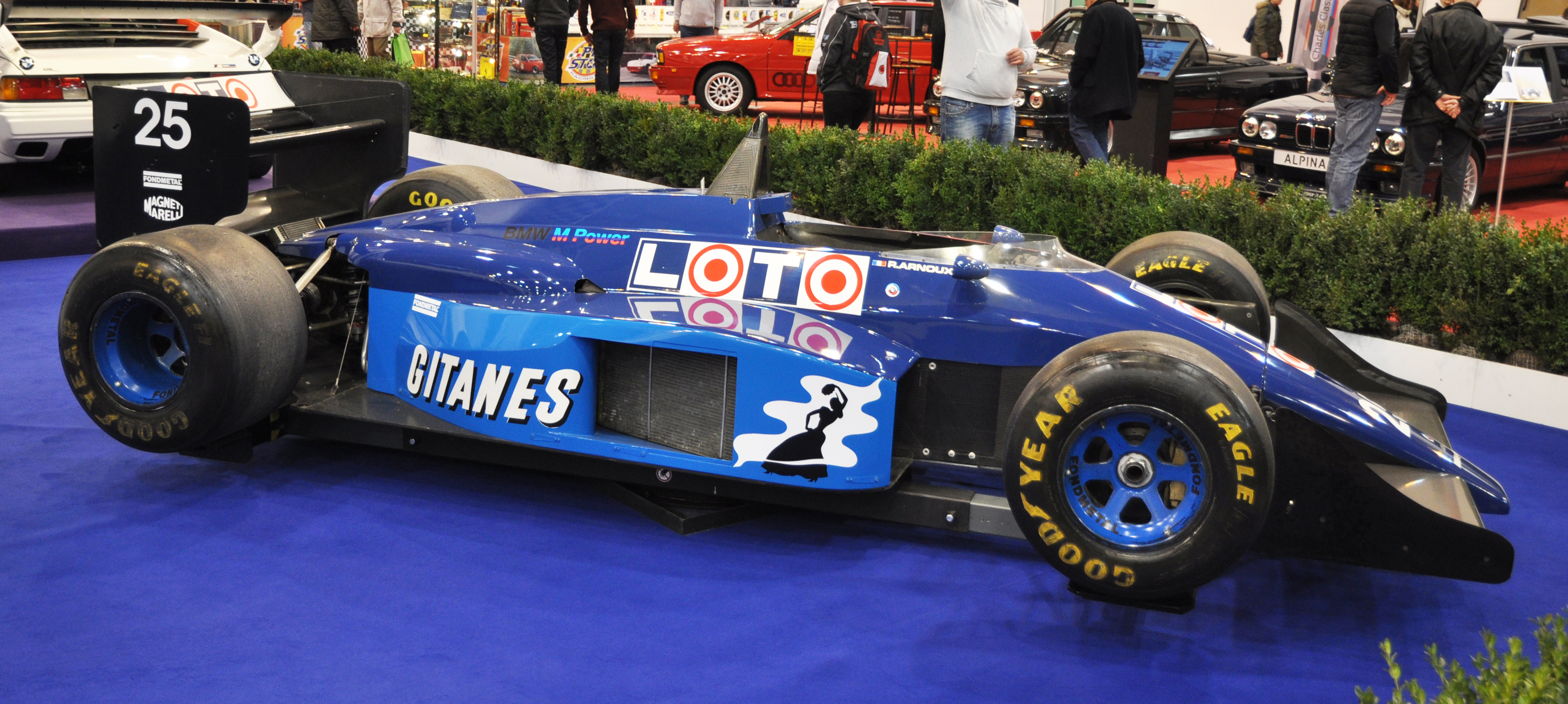
- The JS29 on display at the 2015 Essen Motor Show
- Category: Formula One
- Constructor: Ligier
- Designer(s): Michel Têtu (Technical Director); Claude Galopin (Chief Designer); Michel Beaujon (Head of Design); Henri Durand (Head of Aerodynamics)
- Predecessor: JS27
- Successor: JS31

Technical specifications
- Chassis: Carbon fibre Monocoque
- Suspension (front): Double wishbones, pushrods
- Suspension (rear): Double wishbones, pushrods
- Axle track: Front: 1,790 mm (70 in); Rear: 1,665 mm (65.6 in)
- Wheelbase: 2,835 mm (111.6 in)
- Engine: Megatron, 1,499 cc (91.5 cu in), Straight 4, turbo (4.0 Bar turbo limited), mid-engine, longitudinally mounted
- Transmission: Ligier / Hewland 6-speed manual
- Weight: 540 kg (1,190 lb)
- Fuel: Wintershall / Castrol
- Tyres: Goodyear

Competition history
- Notable entrants: Ligier Loto
- Notable drivers: 25. (France) René Arnoux; 26. (Italy) Piercarlo Ghinzani
- Debut: 1987 San Marino Grand Prix
- Last event: 1987 Australian Grand Prix
Races	Wins	Poles	F/Laps
15	0	0	0
- Constructors' Championships: 0
- Drivers' Championships: 0

The Ligier JS29 was a Formula One car designed by Michel Têtu and Michel Beaujon for the Ligier team for use in the 1987 season. It was originally developed for use with an Alfa Romeo turbo power plant but prior to the start of the season, Ligier lost the use of the engine. The car had to be re-designed around a Megatron Straight 4 turbo engine. Redesignated the JS29B, it scored a single point during the season when driver René Arnoux finished 6th in the Belgian Grand Prix. Later in the season, the car was further refined to a JS29C specification.

== Development ==
The JS29 was originally to be powered by a turbocharged Alfa-Romeo 415T 4-cylinder engine (the 415T had actually been in slow development by the Autodelta since 1984 as a possible replacement for Alfa's heavy, thirsty and underpowered 890T V8 turbo). However, during pre-season testing lead driver René Arnoux publicly gave his thoughts on the engine, scathingly comparing it to "used food" which gave Alfa's parent company Fiat the excuse they had been looking for to pull the plug on the project. It was reported at the time that Fiat, who had just bought Alfa Romeo that year, did not want the then Milan based company involved in Formula One as a competitor to Ferrari, which at that stage they also part-owned.

As a result of losing their engine supply so close to the start of the season, Ligier had to come up with an engine in order to compete. The team managed to get a supply of Megatron Straight 4 turbo engines for the season (the Megatron engine was the old BMW M12 engine formerly used by such teams as Brabham. They had been acquired from BMW by Arrows major sponsor, American insurance company USF&G, and were re-branded Megatron for 1987 and 1988). The updated car with the Megatron engine was now designated the JS29B. Arnoux was retained for the season and he was joined by Italian veteran Piercarlo Ghinzani.

While Guy Ligier was able to lease the Megatron engines from the Arrows team, Arrows boss Jackie Oliver only supplied the French team with the bare minimum of engines while (somewhat understandably) keeping the best and majority for his own team. By the last race of the season in Australia, Ligier only had 7 engines to work with.

The JS29 should have made its debut at the 1987 Brazilian Grand Prix using the Alfa Romeo 890T V8 turbo until the 415T was ready. However, following Arnoux's unfavourable comments, and Fiat's withdrawal, this meant that the team had no engine with which to compete until the second race in San Marino. It was there that the JS29B with its Megatron engine would make its competition debut. The JS29B was updated following the Detroit Grand Prix to its final JS29C specifications. While the JS29 was originally designed for the 4-cylinder Alfa engine, it wasn't simply a case of slotting in the replacement Megatron 4-cylinder in its place. Major differences in the 'plumbing' of the two engines caused the team to have to completely re-design the cars rear suspension as tests showed that the Megatron was causing bad vibrations which was causing suspension failures.

As a result of the late start to the season due to their switch of engines, the Megatron powered Ligiers were never truly close to the pace of the Arrows A10-Megatrons of Derek Warwick and former Ligier driver Eddie Cheever. Only at Hockenheim in Germany did a Ligier (Arnoux) ever qualify in front of both Arrows-Megatrons and only once (Arnoux again at Paul Ricard in France) did a Ligier even split the Arrows in qualifying.

== Race history ==
Arnoux placed his JS29B in 13th place in qualifying for the team's first race of the year at San Marino but failed to start the race following an accident in practice. Ghinzani was 19th and withdrew from the race with handling issues. At the next race, the Belgian Grand Prix, both cars were classified with Arnoux in sixth place for the team's sole point of the year. Ghinzani was 7th although out of fuel and this proved to be his best finish of the year.

The JS29C was introduced at the team's home grand prix in France with Arnoux qualifying in 13th place on the grid. As with Ghinzani, he failed to finish the race itself. The cars usually qualified in the lower half of the grid, with Arnoux outperforming Ghinzani. The best qualifying achieved was Arnoux's 12th at the German Grand Prix.

The JS29C was Ligier's last turbo-powered car. It was replaced in the 1988 season by the Judd CV V8 powered Ligier JS31.

== Complete Formula One World Championship results ==
(key)

Year	Team	Chassis	Engine	Drivers	1	2	3	4	5	6	7	8	9	10	11	12	13	14	15	16	Pts.	WCC
1987	Ligier Loto		Megatron S4 tc		BRA	SMR	BEL	MON	DET	FRA	GBR	GER	HUN	AUT	ITA	POR	ESP	MEX	JPN	AUS	1	11th
1987	Ligier Loto	JS29B	Megatron S4 tc	(France) René Arnoux		DNS	6	11	10												1	11th
1987	Ligier Loto	JS29C	Megatron S4 tc	(France) René Arnoux						Ret	Ret	Ret	Ret	10	10	Ret	Ret	Ret	Ret	Ret	1	11th
1987	Ligier Loto	JS29B	Megatron S4 tc	(Italy) Piercarlo Ghinzani		Ret	7	12	Ret												1	11th
1987	Ligier Loto	JS29C	Megatron S4 tc	(Italy) Piercarlo Ghinzani						Ret	DSQ	Ret	12	8	8	Ret	Ret	Ret	13	Ret	1	11th
