= Ligier JS3 =

Sports racing car

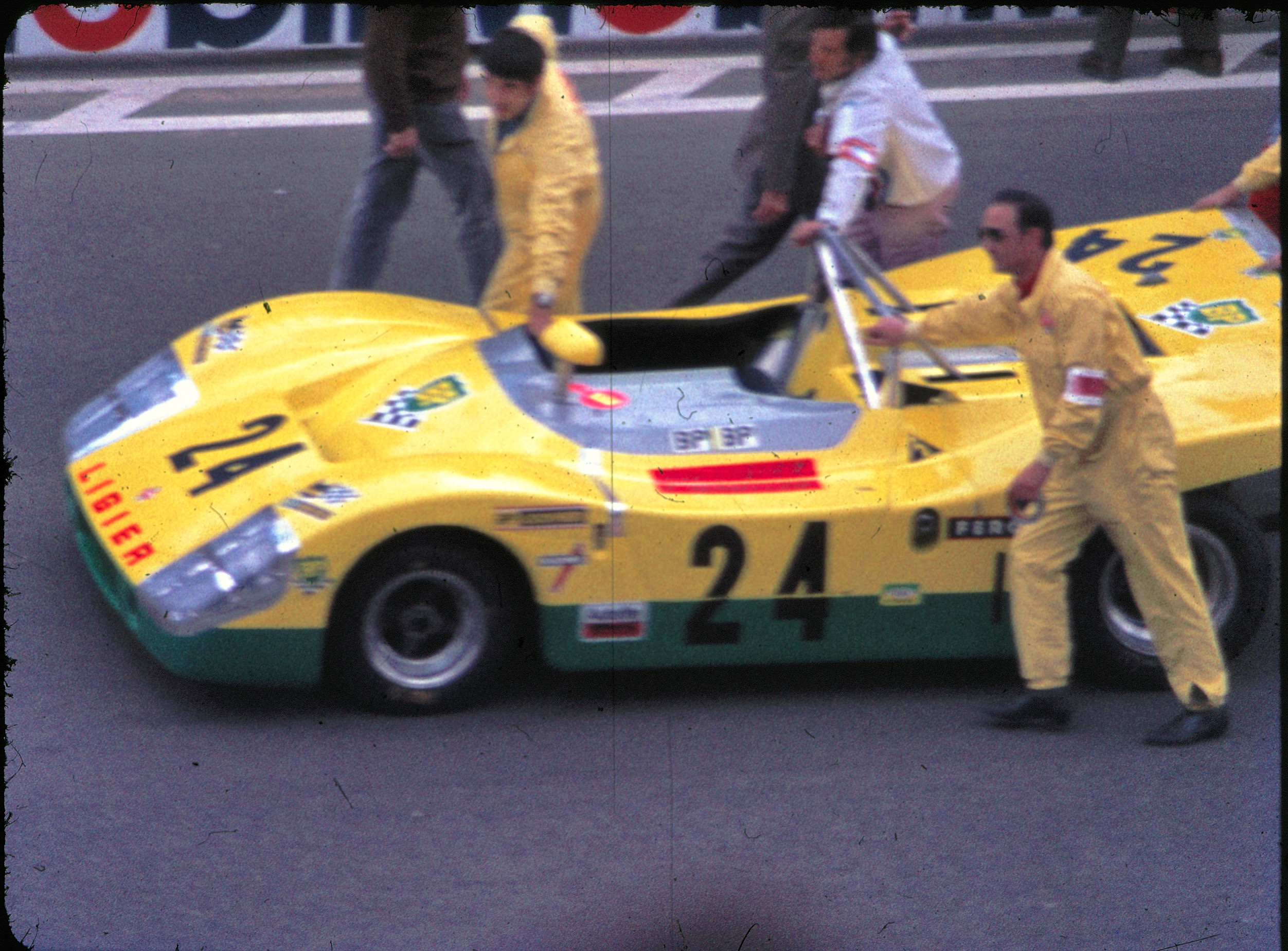
- The JS3 at the 1971 24 Hours of Le Mans
- Constructor: Automobiles Ligier
- Designer: Michel Têtu
- Predecessor: None
- Successor: None

Technical specifications
- Suspension (front): Double wishbones with coilover dampers.
- Suspension (rear): Double wishbones with coilover dampers, radius arms, anti-roll bar.
- Length: 3,500 mm (137.8 in)
- Width: 1,960 mm (77.2 in)
- Height: 750 mm (29.5 in)
- Axle track: 1,560 mm (61.4 in)
- Wheelbase: 2,250 mm (88.6 in)
- Engine: Cosworth DFV 2,993 cc (182.6 cu in) V8 (90°). Normally aspirated. Mid
- Transmission: Hewland 5-speed
- Weight: 650 kg (1,433.0 lb)

Competition history
- Notable entrants: Automobiles Ligier
- Notable drivers: Guy Ligier; Patrick Depailler
- Debut: 1971 24 Hours of Le Mans
Entries	Races	Wins	Podiums
6	6	1	2
Poles	F/Laps		
0	1		

The Ligier JS3 is a sports-racing car built by Automobiles Ligier. It was unveiled in 1971 and ended its competition life the same year. Only one JS3, chassis JS3-01, was ever built.

== The Car ==
The JS3 was designed in late 1970 by Michel Têtu. Two scale models of the car were built and tested at the Eiffel wind tunnel late in January 1971 before choosing one to become the final design. In contrast to the dual-purpose JS1 fixed-head coupé, the JS3 was an open-top two-door two-seat barquette meant exclusively for circuit racing. Like the JS1, the JS3 was named to honour company owner Guy Ligier's former teammate, business partner and close friend Jo Schlesser who died in his 3rd Formula 1 race.

The chassis was a combination of the techniques Têtu used for the JS1 and contemporary Formula 1 practice, resulting in a monocoque of Klegecell-PVC/aluminum-sheet panels and TMAW-welded aluminum.

Ligier chose Cosworth to supply the engine. The JS3 did not use the four-cylinder FVA found in the JS1 but instead got a 2993cc DFV V8 capable of producing more than 400 bhp. This engine had already had considerable success in Formula 1, but far less success in sportscar racing. Keith Duckworth himself felt that the DFV's flat-plane crankshaft would limit the engine's reliability and, thus, potential success, in endurance racing events. The DFV-powered Ford P68 and Ford P69 designed by Len Bailey, for example, were unsuccessful

The Cosworth DFV engine was mated to a 5-speed Hewland transaxle. The particular transaxle used has been reported to have been either an FG400 Formula 1 model or a DG300 sports-racer model.

The engine was mounted as a stressed-member in the chassis, although during restoration it was noted that the way the loads were fed into the tub was not optimal.

Ligier's purpose for building this car was to win the 24 Hours of Le Mans.

The JS3 was officially unveiled on March 15, 1971, at Automobiles Ligier's Vichy workshops. It wore the distinctive green-and-yellow livery of the car's sponsor, British Petroleum.

== Racing history ==
Ligier JS3 complete competition history, 1971
Date	Event	Circuit	Number	Driver(s)	Results
April 18	Le Mans test day	Circuit de la Sarthe	32	(France) Guy Ligier	Posted 7th fastest time and 1st in the 3-litre class.
April 18	3 Heures du Mans	Circuit de la Sarthe	32	(France) Guy Ligier	2nd place.
April 25	Coupe de Printemps	Autodrome de Linas-Montlhéry	10	(France) Guy Ligier	Best lap and win.
May 9	Criterium du Nivernais	Circuit de Nevers Magny-Cours	106	(France) Guy Ligier	DNF.
May 23	Coupes de Vitesse	Autodrome de Linas-Montlhéry	10	(France) Guy Ligier	DNF.
June 13	24 Heures du Mans	Circuit de la Sarthe	24	(France) Guy Ligier (France) Patrick Depailler	Qualified 17th. Not classified.

At the Le Mans 24 Hours the car was driven by Guy Ligier and Patrick Depailler. For the first time the bodywork incorporated headlamps for night driving. Qualifying times were not as impressive as they were during the test days, with the JS3 coming in 17th at the end of qualifying with a time of 3:39.800. 18 hours into the race the team was running in fifth place when the car developed gearbox problems. Ligier decided to attempt a repair, and the Gulf 917 team of John Wyer offered a spare transaxle. Adapting a transmission meant to bolt up to a Porsche engine to the JS3's Cosworth took the mechanics four hours of time in the pits. The car rejoined the race far behind the leaders, and crossed the finish line having completed only 270 laps, 127 fewer than the winners and too few for the car to be classified. It was the only car in its class to finish, and was the first DFV-powered two-seater to race and finish at Le Mans.

While the car typically ran with long-tail bodywork appropriate to high-speed courses, it had a short-tail body at the Criterium du Nivernais.

The car languished at Ligier's Vichy works until it was acquired by Jacques Laffitte in lieu of payment. It was later acquired by Peter Morley cars, and then passed to Nicholas Zapata, who had it restored and raced by Willie Green debut at Coys and win at the annual six-hour classic race at Spa in 2001 and at the 24 Heures du Mans Legend race in 2003. The JS3 was sold to Pierre Bardignon's Mas du Clos and then to Jean Guittard, who raced under the pseudonym of "Mr. John of B". A complete restoration to original specifications was done in 1999 by Simon Hadfield with Geoff Wyatt. It was offered at Christie's in Paris in 2016. Subsequent owners included Mike Jankowski and Jacques Nicolet.

== Historic racing appearances ==
The JS3 has appeared at the following historic racing events:

- 2016 Imola Classic
- 2016 Jarama Classic
- 2015 Dix Mille Tours
- 2015 Monza Historic
- 2015 Grand Prix de l'Age d'Or
- 2014 Dix Mille Tours
- 2014 Le Mans Classic
- 2014 Grand Prix de l'Age d'Or
- 2011 Dix Mille Tours
- 2011 Spa Classic
- 2010 Le Mans Series Silverstone 1000 km (ILMC)
- 2010 Le Mans Classic
- 2006 Le Mans Series Donnington 1000 km
- 2006 Le Mans Classic
- 2004 Le Mans Endurance Series Spa 1000 km
- 2004 Le Mans Classic

Win at 51st GP de l'Age d'Or in 2015 driven by "Mr John of B" (the nom de course of Jean Guittard) and David Ferrer.

== Legacy ==
The JS3 remained the only open-top barquette endurance racer built by Ligier before purchasing the assets of Equipe Matra and entering Formula 1.

An agreement between Guy Ligier and Jacques Nicolet's Onroak Automotive revived the JS3 name for a new series of Prototype racers to be campaigned at Le Mans by Nicolet's own OAK Racing.
