= Michel Têtu =

French automotive engineer (born 1941)

- Born: August 6, 1941 (age 84); Châteauroux, France
- Occupations: Engineer, race car designer

Michel Têtu, born 6 August 1941, is a French engineer best known as a designer of racing sports cars and Formula 1 (F1) cars for marques such as Ligier, Alfa Romeo, and Renault.

== Early years ==
Têtu was born in Châteauroux, France, in the department of Indre.

He graduated from l'École des Techniques Aéronautiques et de Conception Automobile (ETACA), which became l'École supérieure des techniques aéronautiques et de construction automobile (ESTACA) in 1978. He also took classes with the Société des ingénieurs de l'automobile (SIA).

== Career ==
Têtu spent five years with Charles Deutsch at Automobiles CD, joining in 1963 and staying until 1968. While there he was involved with the Le Mans cars, initially the Panhard-engined LM64, and later the Peugeot-powered SP66.

Têtu moved to Ligier in 1969. His first three major designs included Ligier's debut model, the Ligier JS1 sports coupé, followed by the Ligier JS3 sports racing barquette, and then the Ligier JS2 sports coupé.

He then joined Alfa Romeo's Autodelta competition division. He had been brought in to consult on the aerodynamics of the T33/2 Daytona coupé. When he arrived in 1972, Têtu was put in charge of the eight-cylinder Tipo 33s, which were near the end of their development life. He also drew the shape of the Alfa Tipo 33 TT 12 that won the 1975 World Championship for makes.

In 1976, Têtu was contacted by Gérard Larrousse, then with Renault, about the possibility of him joining the company for a special project. Têtu returned to France and began working for Renault Sport in Dieppe. He became one of the lead engineers on Renault's Projet 822, which was released as the Renault 5 Turbo. He was asked to drive the prototype on its first outing.

Têtu's other projects at this time included preparing Alpine A310s for Group 4 competition. He also developed the Renault 5 Alpine Group 2 rally car, which finished second and third at the 1978 Monte Carlo Rally.

At the 1978 24 Hours of Le Mans, Têtu was the race engineer for the winning team of Jean-Pierre Jaussaud and Didier Pironi and their Renault Alpine A442.

In 1978 Têtu moved to the Renault Formula 1 team full time. He designed Renault's first ground effect F1 car, the RE10 (also called the RS10). Driven by Jean-Pierre Jabouille and René Arnoux, the RS10 became the first F1 single-seater with a turbocharged engine to win a Grand Prix race. Têtu went on to design the RE20, RE30, RE40, and RE50, finally leaving Renault in 1984.

In 1985, Têtu went to Équipe Ligier, for whom he designed the JS27, and JS29. After the failure of his innovative Ligier JS31 in 1988, Têtu was fired by Ligier. He then went to the independent Larrousse F1 team, where he designed cars until the end of 1994. He later returned to Ligier Automobiles for a stint that had him designing "voitures sans permis", microcars that can be driven in France without an operator's license.

After leaving Larrousse, Têtu also served as technical adviser for race car builder Mygale. Their MT01 Formula Ford chassis carried Têtu's initials.

== Formula 1 designs ==
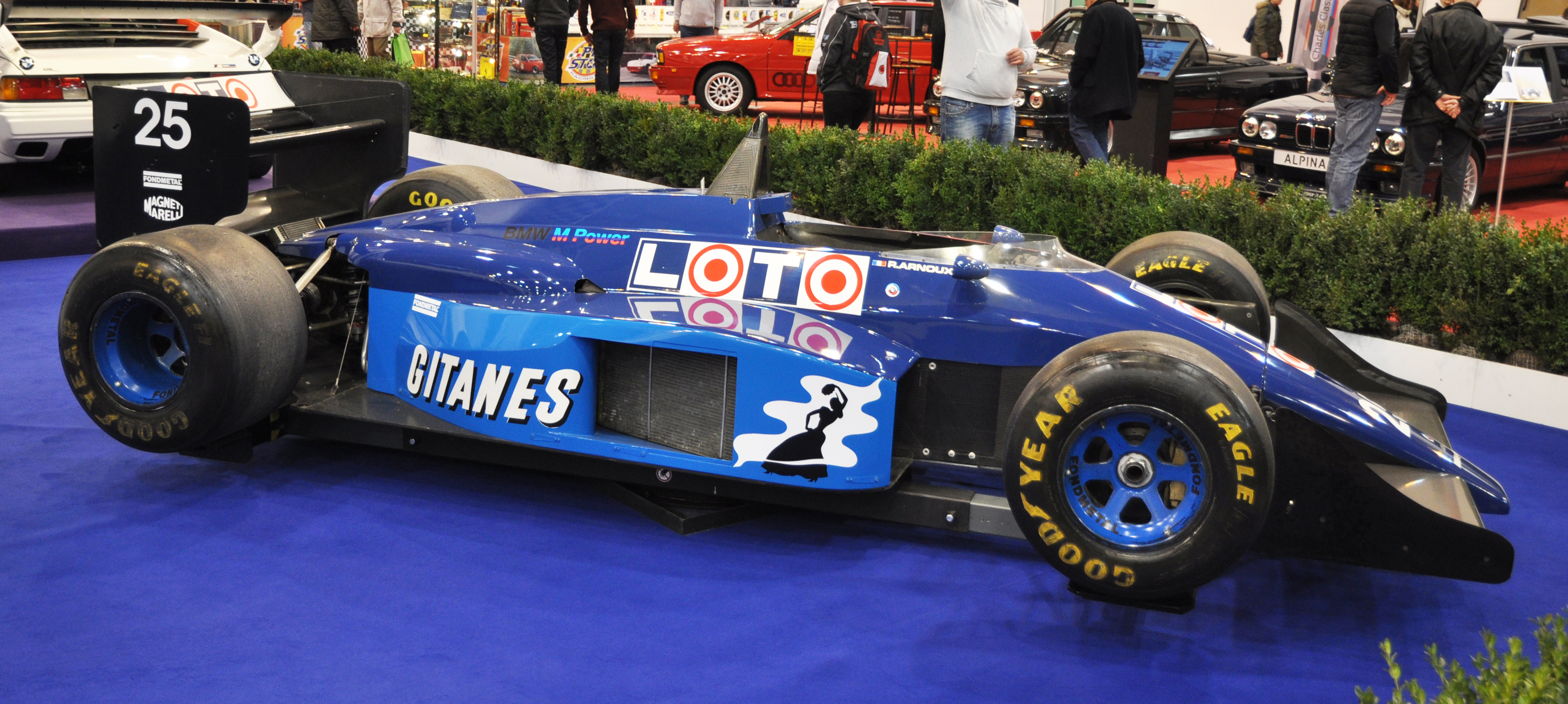
A Ligier JS29 at the 2015 Essen Motor Show.

- Renault RS10
- Renault RE20
- Renault RE20B
- Renault RE30
- Renault RE30B
- Renault RE30C
- Renault RE40
- Renault RE50
- Ligier JS27
- Ligier JS29
- Ligier JS29B
- Ligier JS29C
- Ligier JS31
- Venturi Larrousse LC92
- Larrousse LH93
- Larrousse LH94
- Larrousse LH95

== Other automobile designs ==
- Ligier JS1
- Ligier JS2
- Ligier JS3
- Alfa Romeo T33/2
- Alfa Romeo Tipo 33 TT 12
- Renault 5 Turbo

== Personal life ==
Têtu was president of the Club Ligier JS2 of France.
