= Renault RE20 =

Formula One car (1980)

Renault RE20 Renault RE20B
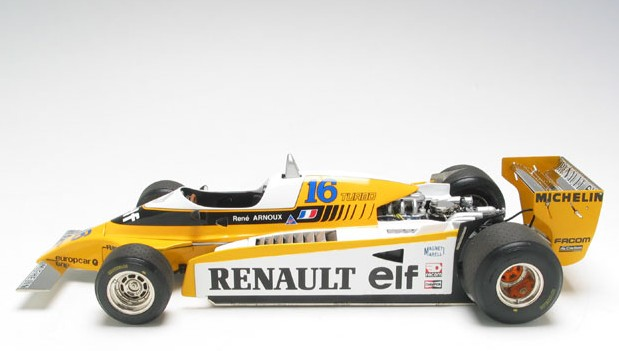
- Category: Formula One
- Constructor: Renault
- Designers: François Castaing (technical director); Michel Têtu (chief designer); Marcel Hubert (head of aerodynamics); Bernard Dudot (chief engine designer)
- Predecessor: RS10
- Successor: RE30

Technical specifications
- Chassis: Aluminium monocoque
- Axle track: Front: 1,720 mm (68 in); Rear: 1,630 mm (64 in)
- Wheelbase: 2,860 mm (113 in)
- Engine: Renault Gordini EF1, 1,492 cc (91.0 cu in), V6, turbo, mid-engine, longitudinally mounted
- Transmission: Hewland FGA 400 5-speed manual
- Weight: 615 kg (1,356 lb)
- Fuel: Elf
- Tyres: Michelin

Competition history
- Notable entrants: Equipe Renault Elf
- Notable drivers: 15. (France) Jean-Pierre Jabouille; 15. (France) Alain Prost; 16. (France) René Arnoux
- Debut: 1980 Argentine Grand Prix
- First win: 1980 Brazilian Grand Prix
- Last win: 1980 Austrian Grand Prix
- Last event: 1981 Belgian Grand Prix
Races	Wins	Podiums	Poles	F/Laps
19	3	5	5	4
- Constructors' Championships: 0
- Drivers' Championships: 0

The Renault RE20 was a Formula One car raced by the Renault team in the 1980 season. The car was designed by François Castaing and Michel Têtu and designed using Ground effect aerodynamics. The car was powered by the 1.5L turbocharged Renault Gordini EF1 engine, which by 1981 was producing a reported 520 bhp (388 kW; 527 PS). This was roughly 50 more than the 3.0L Cosworth DFV V8 still in wide use at the time in Formula One, though Renault's power did lag behind the new 560 bhp (418 kW; 568 PS) turbocharged engine being used by Ferrari. In keeping with everything French on the car, the tyres used by Renault were Michelin.

The driving lineup for the all French team was made up at the time entirely of French drivers. Driving the RE20 in 1980 were Jean-Pierre Jabouille and René Arnoux, while in 1981 Arnoux continued with the team but Jabouille was replaced by a young Alain Prost who had made his Formula One debut in 1980 for McLaren.

The Renault RE20 achieved three Grand Prix wins during the 1980 season. Arnoux won both the Brazilian and South African races while Jabouille was the winner of the Austrian Grand Prix.

A modified version of the car, the RE20B, raced in first five races of the 1981 season. The RE20B was replaced by the Renault RE30.

== Complete Formula One World Championship results ==
(key) (note: results shown in bold indicate pole position; results in italics indicate fastest lap)

Year	Entrant	Engine	Tyres	Driver	1	2	3	4	5	6	7	8	9	10	11	12	13	14	15	Pts.	WCC
1980	Equipe Renault Elf	Renault Gordini EF1; V6 tc	MI		ARG	BRA	RSA	USW	BEL	MON	FRA	GBR	GER	AUT	NED	ITA	CAN	USA		**38**	4th
1980	Equipe Renault Elf	Renault Gordini EF1; V6 tc	MI	(France) Jean-Pierre Jabouille	Ret	**Ret**	**Ret**	NC	Ret	Ret	Ret	Ret	Ret	1	13†	Ret	Ret			**38**	4th
1980	Equipe Renault Elf	Renault Gordini EF1; V6 tc	MI	(France) René Arnoux	Ret	1	1	9	4	Ret	5	NC	Ret	**9**	**2**	**10**	Ret	7		**38**	4th
1981	Equipe Renault Elf	Renault Gordini EF1; V6 tc	MI		USW	BRA	ARG	SMR	BEL	MON	ESP	FRA	GBR	GER	AUT	NED	ITA	CAN	CPL	**54***	3rd
1981	Equipe Renault Elf	Renault Gordini EF1; V6 tc	MI	(France) Alain Prost	Ret	Ret	3	Ret	Ret											**54***	3rd
1981	Equipe Renault Elf	Renault Gordini EF1; V6 tc	MI	(France) René Arnoux	8	Ret	5	8	DNQ											**54***	3rd

* 48 points scored in 1981 using the Renault RE30
