= Larrousse LH94 =

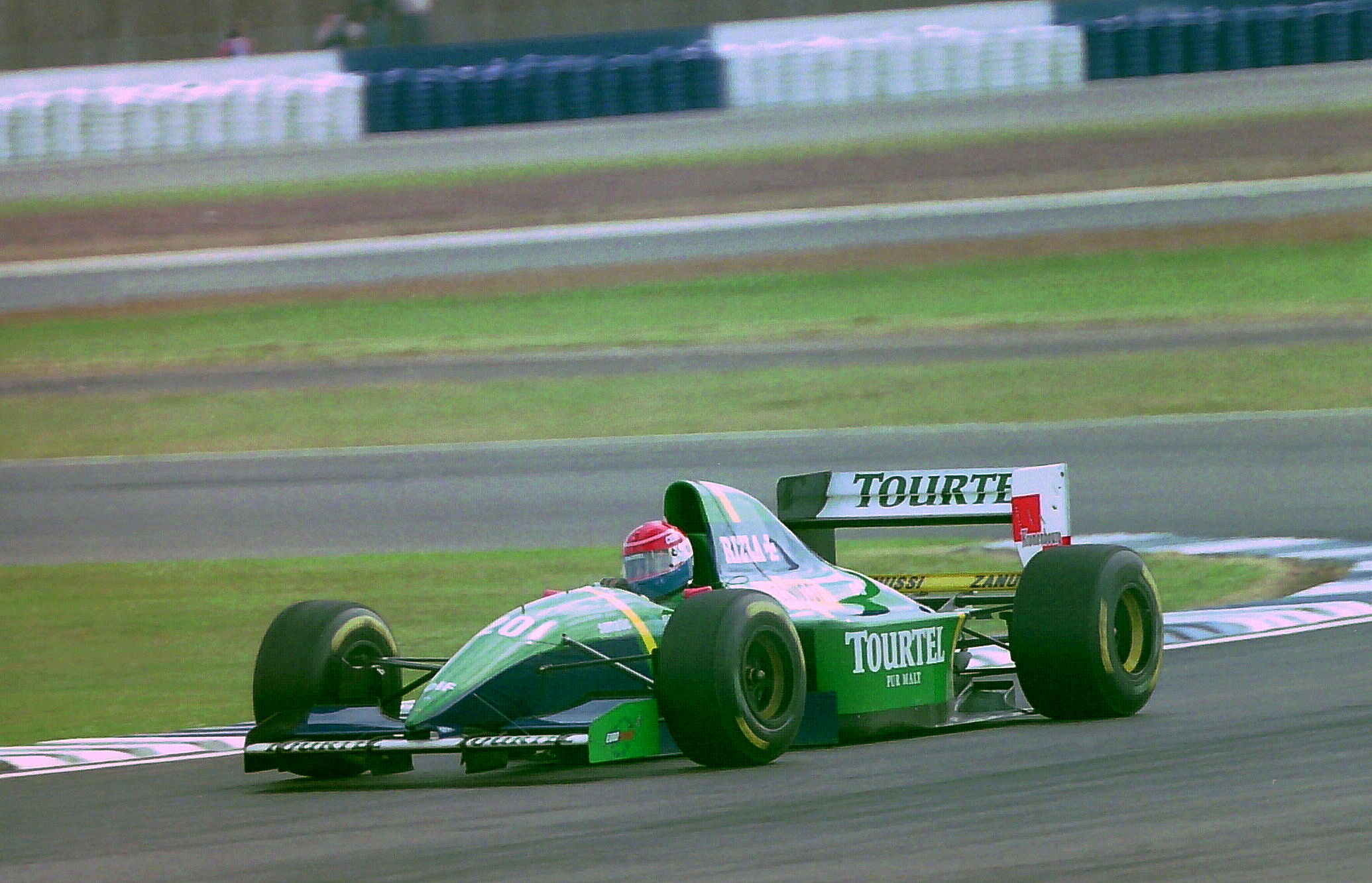
- Érik Comas driving the LH94 at the British Grand Prix
- Category: Formula One
- Constructor: Larrousse
- Designers: Robin Herd (Technical Director); Michel Têtu (Chief Designer); Tim Holloway (Chief Engineer); Tino Belli (Head of Aerodynamics); Douglas Skinner (Designer)
- Predecessor: LH93
- Successor: LH95 (never raced)

Technical specifications
- Chassis: Carbon fibre composite monocoque
- Suspension (front): Double wishbone, pushrod, inboard coil spring/damper
- Suspension (rear): Double wishbone, pushrod, inboard coil spring/damper
- Wheelbase: 2,940 mm (116 in)
- Engine: Ford HBF7 / Ford HBF8, 3,494 cc (213.2 cu in), 75° V8, NA, mid-engine, longitudinally mounted
- Transmission: Transverse 6-speed semi-automatic
- Weight: 520 kg (1,150 lb)
- Fuel: Elf
- Tyres: Goodyear

Competition history
- Notable entrants: Larrousse Tourtel F1
- Notable drivers: 19. (Monaco) Olivier Beretta; 19. (France) Philippe Alliot; 19. (France) Yannick Dalmas; 19. (Japan) Hideki Noda; 20. (France) Érik Comas; 20. (Switzerland) Jean-Denis Délétraz
- Debut: 1994 Brazilian Grand Prix
- Last event: 1994 Australian Grand Prix
Races	Wins	Podiums	Poles	F/Laps
16	0	0	0	0
- Constructors' Championships: 0
- Drivers' Championships: 0

The Larrousse LH94 was the car with which the Larrousse team competed in the 1994 Formula One World Championship. It was the second car to be fully constructed by Larrousse, which had previously contracted specialist chassis-builders to build its cars: Lola from 1987 to 1991 and Fondmetal in 1992. This was also the final car to be built and raced by Larrousse, as the team did not survive in 1995 owing to financial problems.

== Concept and development ==
The LH94 was designed by Larrousse UK, a fifteen-strong component of the team based in Bicester, England, and owned by Robin Herd. It was based around the monocoque of the previous year's LH93 chassis. The front suspension of the LH94 remained unchanged from the previous year, although the team changed its damper supplier from Bilstein to Penske. The car was also more structurally rigid than the LH93.

The main differences between the LH94 and its predecessor were that the LH94 had a smaller fuel tank to take advantage of the reintroduction of refuelling in pit stops in 1994 and a different engine. In 1993, Larrousse had used Chrysler-funded Lamborghini V12s, but the programme was halted for 1994. The team decided to return to Ford power, using the Series 7 version of the Cosworth HB engine, which had powered the Benetton and McLaren teams the previous year. Larrousse had previously used Ford Cosworth engines in 1987, 1988, and 1991.

Larrousse also made a deal with Benetton to use the team's 1993 gearbox in the LH94 chassis. Larrousse's association with Benetton was to prove controversial, however, as the former became involved in the aftermath of the latter's pit fire at the 1994 German Grand Prix, wherein Benetton's excuse for removing a filter in the fuel hose was attributed to communication between Larrousse and the fuel-equipment manufacturer, Intertechnique, which apparently authorised Larrousse to remove the filters in its own fuel hoses.

Despite a limited budget, Larrousse had a testing schedule planned for the 1994 season. However, following the deaths of Roland Ratzenberger and Ayrton Senna at the San Marino Grand Prix, the technical regulations were changed for subsequent races to slow the cars down by making the chassis produce less downforce and the engine less power. This resulted in new components having to be built for the LH94 and a new supply of spare parts to be confirmed for the rest of the season, which eliminated the financial support for any further development.

Four chassis were constructed. The first three were ready for the beginning of the season, whilst chassis LH94/4 came into service at the French Grand Prix, replacing LH94/3.

== Racing history ==
Larrousse began the year with drivers Érik Comas, who had raced for the team the previous year, and Olivier Beretta, an F1 rookie who paid for his seat after experience in Formula 3000. The year began promisingly, with Comas taking 13th place on the grid at the Brazilian Grand Prix and scoring a point in the next race at Aida. However, the regulation changes following the San Marino Grand Prix resulted in development work on the car ceasing, which coincided with a run of engine failures for both cars from the Spanish Grand Prix through the middle of the season. Despite the efficient gear changes provided by the Benetton transmission, which in Comas' words made it "fun to drive the car", the LH94 suffered from abiding understeer and poor traction. As the team's rivals made progress throughout the year, Larrousse gradually sank towards the back of the grid. Comas did, however, manage to score another point at the attritional German Grand Prix.

Larrousse's parlous financial situation was exposed towards the end of the year, when Beretta was dropped after his financial support dried up and the team was forced to resort to pay drivers in a last-ditch attempt to survive. His seat was henceforth shared between former Larrousse drivers Philippe Alliot and Yannick Dalmas, in addition to rookie Hideki Noda. At the season-closing Australian Grand Prix, which would prove to be the team's last F1 race, team leader Comas was also replaced by Jean-Denis Délétraz.

Larrousse attempted to enter the 1995 season but had not had enough funds over the winter to build the LH95, which had been designed by Herd. The team then merged with the abortive Junior F1 Team before the start of the season, enabling it to build the LH95 whilst additional sponsorship was sought, but not in time for the first race. This raised the prospect of the LH94 being modified to meet the new technical regulations and pass the tougher crash tests as a temporary solution to compete in the Brazilian and Argentine Grands Prix, but the team elected to miss these rounds of the season and focus on readying the LH95 for the next race at Imola. The modified LH94 would have undoubtedly been extremely overweight and uncompetitive. However, Larrousse was unable to raise the funds necessary for further competition in F1 and withdrew from the sport, meaning that the LH95 was never built and never raced.

== Livery ==
The livery was influenced by its new sponsor, after several years being funded by the French government, Larrousse secured sponsorship from the Belgian Alken-Maes brewery. Therefore, it usually ran in a Tourtel livery, although on occasion this was replaced by a red-and-white colour scheme of its sister brand Kronenbourg. Zanussi, Rizla, and SEITA (alternating between Gitanes and Gauloises, except at French, British, and German Grands Prix) joined as the team's secondary sponsors.

== Post-racing career ==
After the 1994 season finished, not too much was known about the history of the cars until recently.

At least two cars have been transformed into three-seater demonstrators, with cockpit sections and seats grafted onto the sidepods of the chassis.

These cars are known as the 'tri-place' and they have new chassis numbers, with one of them being '01-7'. They are run by LRS Formula, based at the Magny-Cours circuit, and are available for rides.

== Complete Formula One results ==
(key)

Year	Entrant	Engine	Tyres	Drivers	1	2	3	4	5	6	7	8	9	10	11	12	13	14	15	16	Pts.	WCC
1994	Larrousse Tourtel F1	Ford HB; V8	G		BRA	PAC	SMR	MON	ESP	CAN	FRA	GBR	GER	HUN	BEL	ITA	POR	EUR	JPN	AUS	2	11th
1994	Larrousse Tourtel F1	Ford HB; V8	G	Olivier Beretta	Ret	Ret	Ret	8	DNS	Ret	Ret	14	7	9							2	11th
1994	Larrousse Tourtel F1	Ford HB; V8	G	Philippe Alliot											Ret						2	11th
1994	Larrousse Tourtel F1	Ford HB; V8	G	Yannick Dalmas												Ret	14				2	11th
1994	Larrousse Tourtel F1	Ford HB; V8	G	Hideki Noda														Ret	Ret	Ret	2	11th
1994	Larrousse Tourtel F1	Ford HB; V8	G	Érik Comas	9	6	Ret	10	Ret	Ret	11	Ret	6	8	Ret	8	Ret	Ret	9		2	11th
1994	Larrousse Tourtel F1	Ford HB; V8	G	Jean-Denis Délétraz																Ret	2	11th
