= Renault RS10 =

Formula One Car for 1979 season

Renault RS10 (RS10 RS11 RS12)
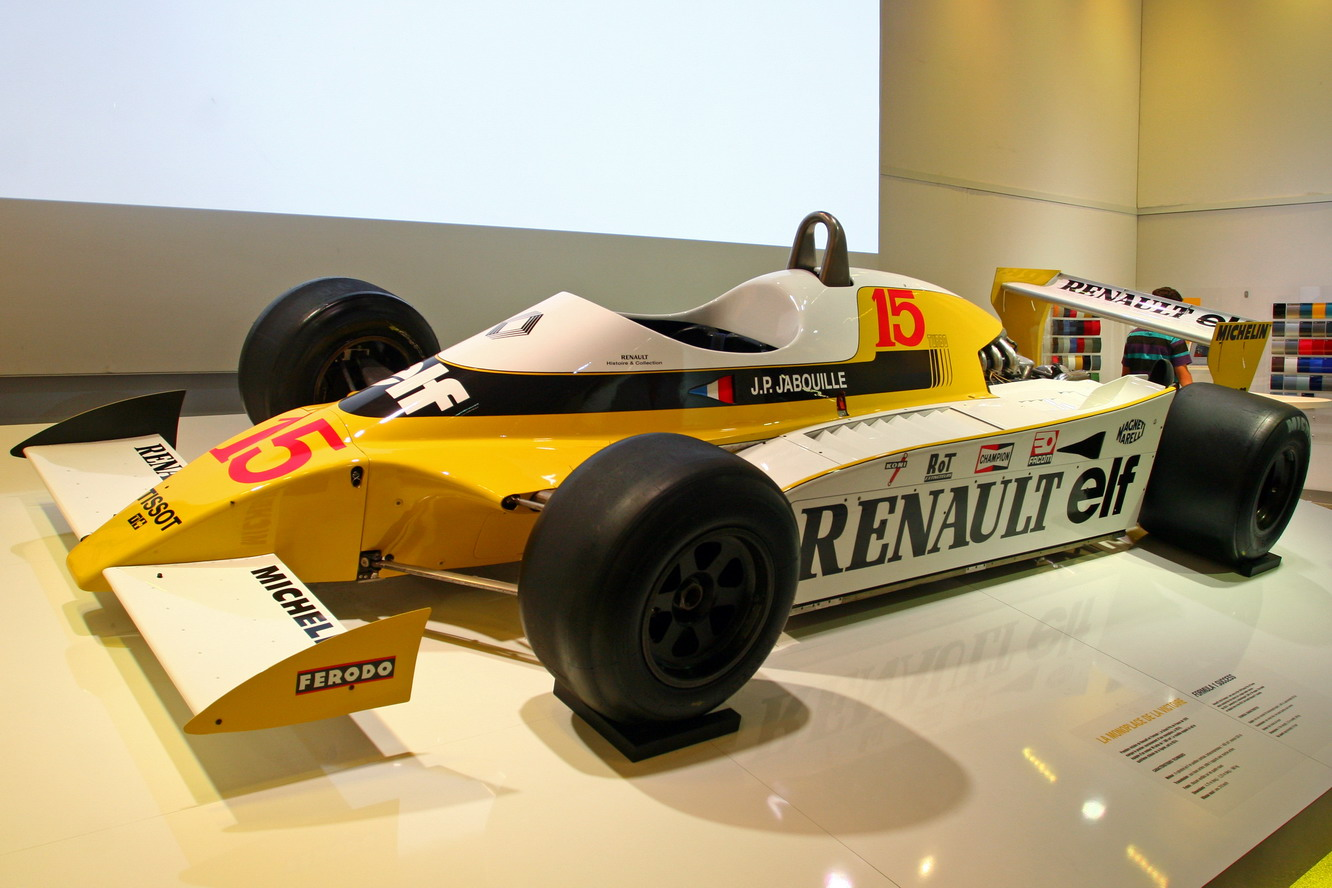
- The RS10 of Jean-Pierre Jabouille
- Category: Formula One
- Constructor: Renault
- Designers: François Castaing (Technical Director); Michel Têtu (Chief Designer); Marcel Hubert (Head of Aerodynamics); Bernard Dudot (Chief Engine Designer)
- Predecessor: RS01
- Successor: RE20

Technical specifications
- Chassis: Aluminium monocoque
- Suspension (front): Double wishbone, inboard spring / damper
- Suspension (rear): Parallel top links, lower wishbones, twin radius arms, outboard spring / damper
- Engine: Renault 1,496 cc (91.3 cu in), 90° V6, twin-turbocharged (KKK turbos), mid-engine, longitudinally mounted, 500 bhp @ 11,000 rpm
- Transmission: Hewland FGA 400 6-speed manual
- Fuel: Elf
- Tyres: Michelin

Competition history
- Notable entrants: Equipe Renault Elf
- Notable drivers: 15. (France) Jean-Pierre Jabouille; 16. (France) René Arnoux
- Debut: 1979 Monaco Grand Prix
- First win: 1979 French Grand Prix
- Last win: 1979 French Grand Prix
- Last event: 1979 United States Grand Prix
Races	Wins	Podiums	Poles	F/Laps
11	1	4	5	2
- Constructors' Championships: 0
- Drivers' Championships: 0

The Renault RS10 was a Formula 1 car developed to compete in the 1979 Formula One season, which became the first turbocharged F1 car to win a Grand Prix. This changed the framework of F1 as this car spurred the development of the 1,300 bhp (970 kW) turbocharged cars of the 1980s and rang the death knell for normally aspirated engines. This car, along with its predecessor, the Renault RS01, was one of the most revolutionary Grand Prix cars of all time.

== Development ==
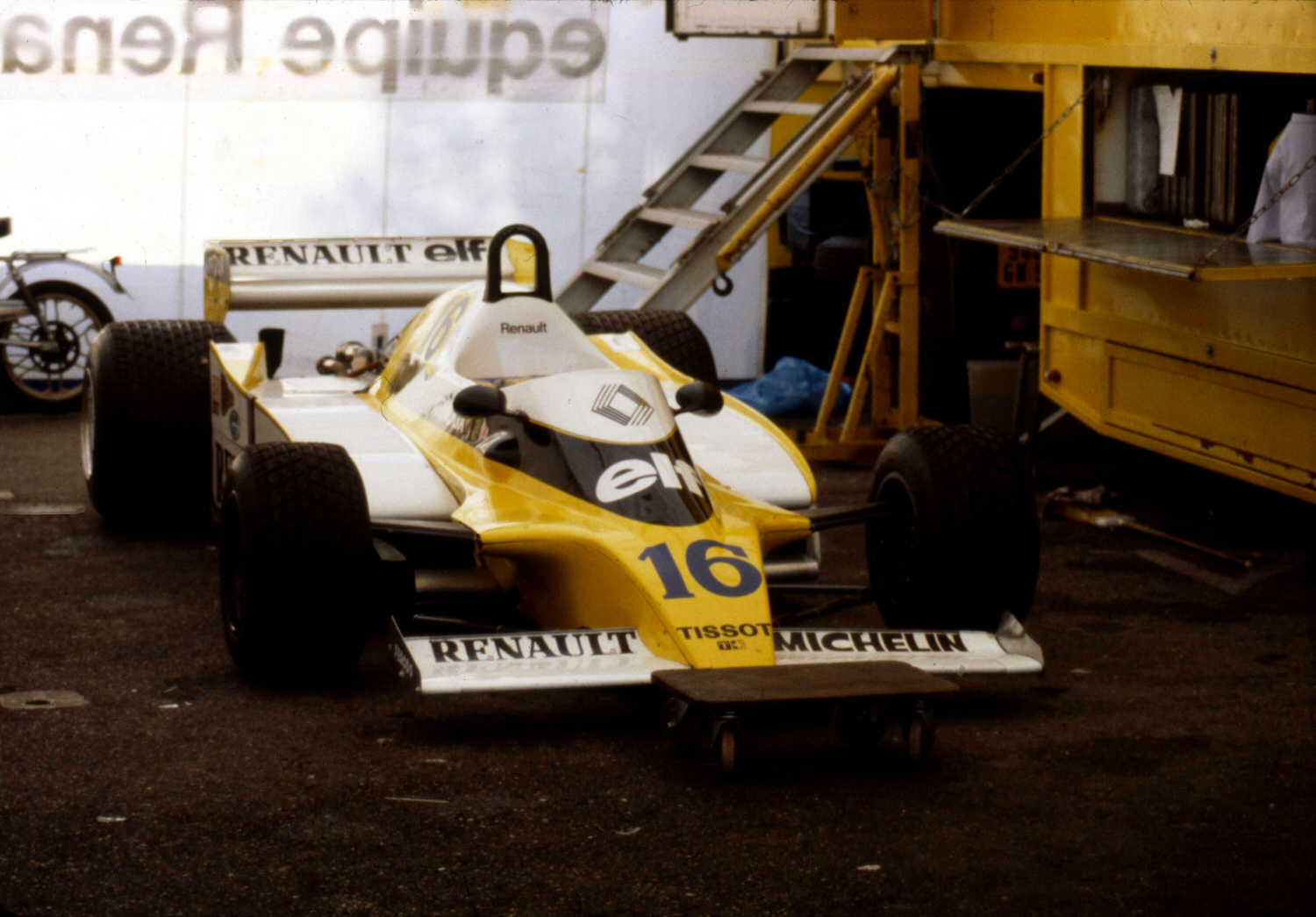
RS10 from the 1979 Monaco Grand Prix.

The RS10 was designed and developed by François Castaing, Michel Têtu and Marcel Hubert and was developed from the much-maligned RS01. The RS01 was conceived alongside Renault's effort to build a turbocharged Le Mans winning car. The RS01 was no more than a development mule for the 1.5-litre turbocharged engine. Jean-Pierre Jabouille with his engineering degree, mechanical aptitude and driving skill was hired to run Renault's F1 program in 1977. Jabouille worked to develop this engine over the 1977-1979 seasons. The Renault turbo effort was a joke along the paddock as the RS01 earned the moniker "Yellow Teapot" as its race would often end with the yellow car smoking and parked. It would not be long however, before the jokes and laughs along the grid turned to panic.

The RS10 was finally built in 1979 as a serious contender with a Renault Gordini twin-turbo 1.5-litre V6. Where the RS10 differed from the RS01, however, was that it incorporated twin-turbochargers, a 6-speed transmission and a completely new ground effect chassis.

== Racing history ==
The RS10 was introduced a third of the way through the 1979 season at the 1979 Spanish Grand Prix. Initially only one car was available for Jean-Pierre Jabouille and it retained the single turbocharger of its predecessor. At the Monaco Grand Prix a second car became available for René Arnoux and twin turbochargers were used for the first time.

Although the twin-turbo RS10 experienced frequent reliability problems, it achieved five pole positions during the final eight races of the 1979 season. Jabouille won the French Grand Prix at Dijon-Prenois, the car's only victory.

== Legacy ==
The car and team that began as a joke quickly had the paddock scrambling. Ferrari and Brabham (using BMW engines) quickly put together a turbo program in the 1980s, soon to be joined by the likes of McLaren (TAG-Porsche) and Williams (Honda). The other major manufactures did so as well as the turbo cars began to gain power and reliability. Soon all the major teams had forced-induction power. The smaller, mainly British teams (most notably Tyrrell who were the last major team to turn to turbo power, Renault no less, in 1985) lacked the funding to obtain this technology and their results suffered. The turbos became so disparagingly fast that in 1986 non-turbos were banned, on grounds that they could not provide any meaningful competition to races.

In an attempt to limit soaring engine power outputs (by 1986, the 4cyl BMW engine was reportedly producing around 1,400 hp (1,044 kW) in qualifying, with the Renault's output quoted at around 1,300 hp (969 kW)), and the escalating costs of research and development, turbo boost was severely limited to 4.0 Bar in 1987 and 2.5 Bar in 1988, before turbos were banned from 1989. Turbo pioneers Renault never won a championship using the technology, although they did manage two runner-up positions. Conclusively, their vision in the late 1970s sparked a new era in Formula One.

== Complete Formula One results ==
(key) (results in bold indicate pole position; results in italics indicate fastest lap)

Year	Entrant	Engine	Tyres	Drivers	1	2	3	4	5	6	7	8	9	10	11	12	13	14	15	Points	WCC
1979	Equipe Renault Elf	Renault-Gordini EF1 1.5 V6 turbocharged	**M**		ARG	BRA	RSA	USW	ESP	BEL	MON	FRA	GBR	GER	AUT	NED	ITA	CAN	USA	**26**	**6th**
1979	Equipe Renault Elf	Renault-Gordini EF1 1.5 V6 turbocharged	**M**	(France) Jean-Pierre Jabouille					Ret	Ret	8	**1**	Ret	**Ret**	Ret	Ret	**14**	Ret	Ret	**26**	**6th**
1979	Equipe Renault Elf	Renault-Gordini EF1 1.5 V6 turbocharged	**M**	(France) René Arnoux							Ret	3	2	Ret	**6**	**Ret**	Ret	Ret	2	**26**	**6th**
