= Renault RE30 =

Formula One racing car

Renault RE30 Renault RE30B Renault RE30C
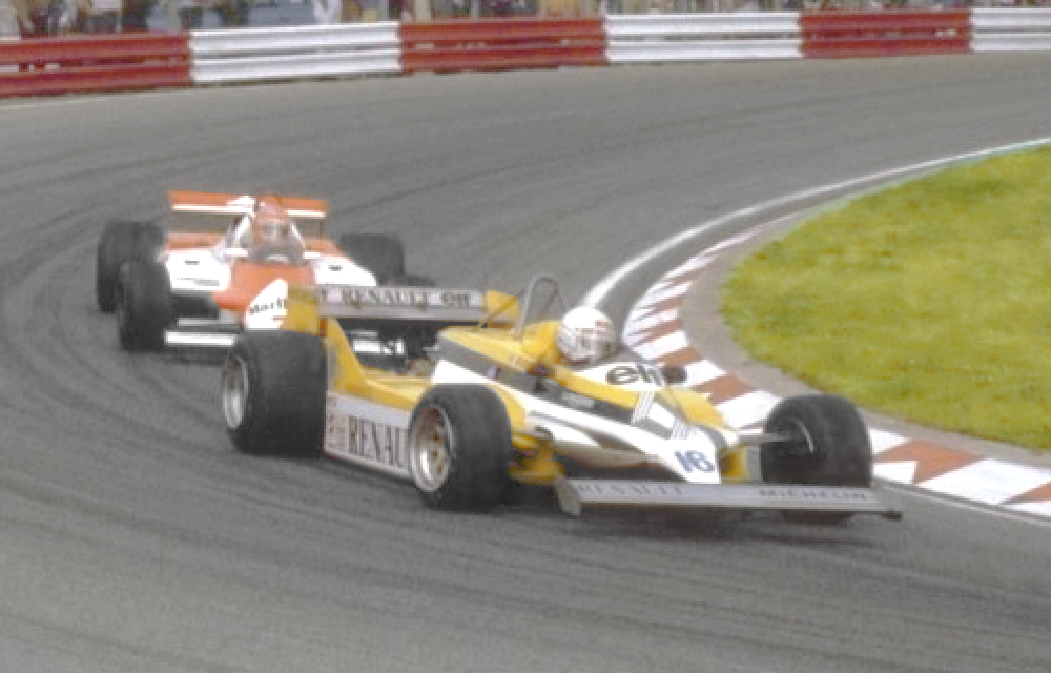
- René Arnoux with the RE30 at the 1981 Dutch Grand Prix
- Category: Formula One
- Constructor: Renault
- Designers: Bernard Dudot (Technical Director, lead engine designer); Michel Têtu (Chief Designer (chassis)); Marcel Hubert (Head of Aerodynamics)
- Predecessor: RE20
- Successor: RE40

Technical specifications
- Chassis: Aluminium honeycomb monocoque with carbon fibre stress points
- Suspension (front): upper rocker arms, lower wishbones
- Suspension (rear): upper rocker arms, lower wishbones
- Axle track: Front: 1,740 mm (69 in); Rear: 1,630 mm (64 in)
- Wheelbase: 2,730 mm (107 in)
- Engine: Renault Gordini EF1, 1,492 cc (91.0 cu in), 90° V6, turbo mid-engine, longitudinally mounted
- Transmission: 5 speed manual
- Weight: 605 kg (1,334 lb)
- Fuel: Elf
- Tyres: Michelin

Competition history
- Notable entrants: Equipe Renault Elf
- Notable drivers: 15. (France) Alain Prost; 16. (France) René Arnoux
- Debut: 1981 Monaco Grand Prix
- First win: 1981 French Grand Prix
- Last win: 1982 Italian Grand Prix
- Last event: 1983 United States West Grand Prix
- Constructors' Championships: 0
- Drivers' Championships: 0

The Renault RE30 was a Formula One car designed by Bernard Dudot and Michel Têtu for use by the Renault team in the 1981 Formula One season. An updated version, the RE30B, was used in the 1982 season, and a further update, the RE30C, at the start of the 1983 season.

== History ==
=== 1981 ===
The RE30 was an entirely different design from its predecessor, the RE20. It incorporated carbon fibre – a material which was becoming increasingly commonplace in F1 at the time – into parts of its construction, and featured distinctive aerodynamic kick-ups ahead of the rear wheels. The initial version featured a full span front wing. The turbocharged engine was developed further, producing around 540 bhp (400 kW), with twin KKK turbochargers. The car had advanced ground effect technology, with concessions given to the new rules for 1981 which banned sliding skirts. The car was quick - probably the quickest car in the field - but it came too late in the season to overcome the RE20B's unreliability in the first part of the season. It was the only car that could pass the very powerful, but downforce-lacking, Ferrari 126C in a straight line.

After the team used the RE20 for the first five races of the 1981 World Championship, the RE30 made its debut at the Monaco Grand Prix. At the team's home race in France, René Arnoux put the car on pole position, before team-mate Alain Prost took his first Grand Prix victory. The car then took pole in each of the next five races (Arnoux three times and Prost twice), with Prost winning again in Holland and finishing second in Germany, and Arnoux finishing second in Austria. Prost then took a third win in Italy, before rounding off the year with another second place at Caesars Palace. Prost thus finished fifth in the Drivers' Championship with Arnoux ninth, while the team took third in the Constructors' Championship.

=== 1982 ===
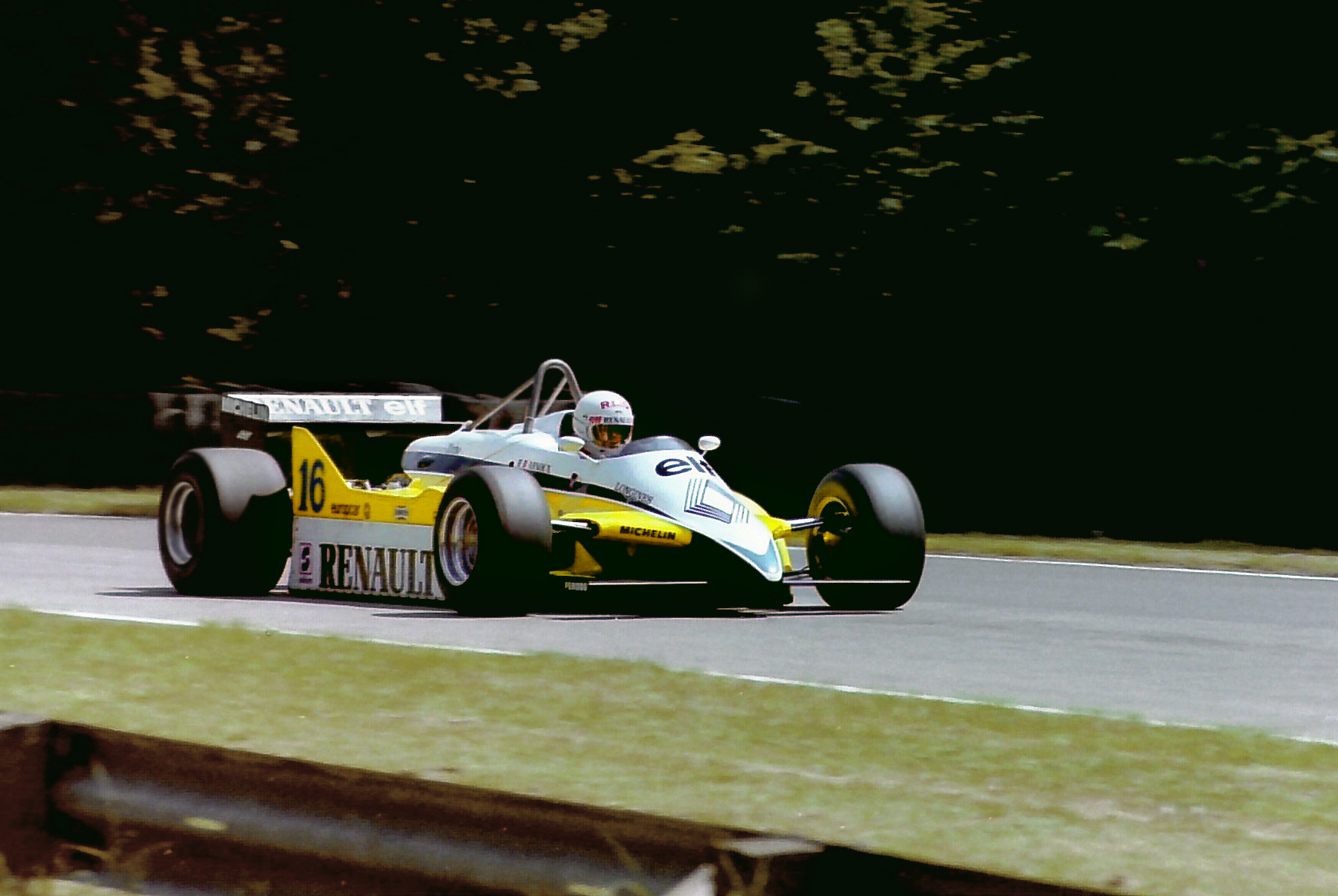
René Arnoux driving the RE30B at the 1982 British Grand Prix

For 1982, the car was updated and modified with a redesigned nose section that featured separate left and right front wings and a new rear wing, becoming RE30 in "B" specification. Advances in ground effect meant that the cars frequently ran without the front wings attached. The engine was further developed to give around 590 bhp. Prost made a strong start to the season and won in Brazil and South Africa, to underline his intention to win the championship that season. However, those would be his only victories of the year, as Ferrari, Williams and McLaren overtook Renault in the technology race. The RE30B was a formidable qualifying car, with Prost or Arnoux on pole for the majority of the races, but reliability was suspect for both drivers, mostly due to problems with the new and rather experimental electronic fuel injection which failed repeatedly during the races. Corporate politics at Renault effectively forced the team to use the system throughout the season. It was a shame, because the RE30B was probably the most competitive car that season, having the best compromise on outright performance - with a good chassis and aerodynamics - and a powerful enough engine. The car was quick around all kinds of different circuits - even around even tight, slow circuits like Monaco, Detroit, Zolder and Long Beach - where the other cars with turbo-charged engines (Ferrari, Brabham-BMW, and less competitively Toleman-Hart) lacked in performance, due to the heavier weight and poor engine pickup, thanks to massive turbo lag, so the cars with the less powerful naturally aspirated engines were able to capitalize by being able to get more power more quickly out of slow corners. Arnoux took two wins during the latter half of the year, but only finished four races during the whole season. Prost was in sight of victory at Monaco, Austria and Dijon but had problems during the final laps of all three races. He eventually salvaged fourth in the championship, whilst Renault finished third in the constructors' championship.

=== 1983 ===
The RE30 was further updated to "C" specification for the start of the 1983 season, before the new RE40 became available. Prost and new team-mate Eddie Cheever both drove the RE30C at the season opener in Brazil, with Cheever then driving the car again at Long Beach. The RE30C complied with the "flat bottom" rules enacted that year, with a much larger rear wing and revised front wings.

With seven wins and sixteen pole positions, the RE30 was Renault's most successful car until Fernando Alonso's world championships of 2005 and 2006.

== Complete Formula One results ==
(key) (results in bold indicate pole position; results in italics indicate fastest lap)

Year	Entrant	Chassis	Engine	Tyres	Drivers	1	2	3	4	5	6	7	8	9	10	11	12	13	14	15	16	Points	WCC
1981	Equipe Renault Elf	RE30	Renault-Gordini EF1 V6 (t/c)	MI		USW	BRA	ARG	SMR	BEL	MON	ESP	FRA	GBR	GER	AUT	NED	ITA	CAN	CPL		**54***	3rd
1981	Equipe Renault Elf	RE30	Renault-Gordini EF1 V6 (t/c)	MI	(France) Alain Prost						Ret	Ret	1	Ret	**2**	Ret	**1**	1	Ret	2		**54***	3rd
1981	Equipe Renault Elf	RE30	Renault-Gordini EF1 V6 (t/c)	MI	(France) René Arnoux						Ret	9	**4**	**9**	13	**2**	Ret	**Ret**	Ret	Ret		**54***	3rd
1982	Equipe Renault Elf	RE30B	Renault-Gordini EF1 V6 (t/c)	MI		RSA	BRA	USW	SMR	BEL	MON	DET	CAN	NED	GBR	FRA	GER	AUT	SUI	ITA	CPL	**62**	3rd
1982	Equipe Renault Elf	RE30B	Renault-Gordini EF1 V6 (t/c)	MI	(France) Alain Prost	1	**1**	Ret	Ret	**Ret**	7	**NC**	Ret	Ret	6	2	Ret	8	**2**	Ret	**4**	**62**	3rd
1982	Equipe Renault Elf	RE30B	Renault-Gordini EF1 V6 (t/c)	MI	(France) René Arnoux	**3**	Ret	Ret	**Ret**	Ret	**Ret**	10	Ret	**Ret**	Ret	**1**	2	Ret	16	1	Ret	**62**	3rd
1983	Equipe Renault Elf	RE30C	Renault-Gordini EF1 V6 (t/c)	MI		BRA	USW	FRA	SMR	MON	BEL	DET	CAN	GBR	GER	AUT	NED	ITA	EUR	RSA		79**	2nd
1983	Equipe Renault Elf	RE30C	Renault-Gordini EF1 V6 (t/c)	MI	(France) Alain Prost	7																79**	2nd
1983	Equipe Renault Elf	RE30C	Renault-Gordini EF1 V6 (t/c)	MI	(United States) Eddie Cheever	Ret	13															79**	2nd

* 6 points scored using the Renault RE20
** All 79 points scored using the Renault RE40

== Sources ==
- Pritchard, Anthony (1986). Directory of Formula One Cars 1966-1986. Aston Publications. pp. 180–182. ISBN 0-946627-02-9.
- Nye, Doug (1986). Autocourse History of the Grand Prix Car 1966-1985. Hazleton Publishing. p. 231. ISBN 0-905138-37-6.
