= Ligier JS2 =

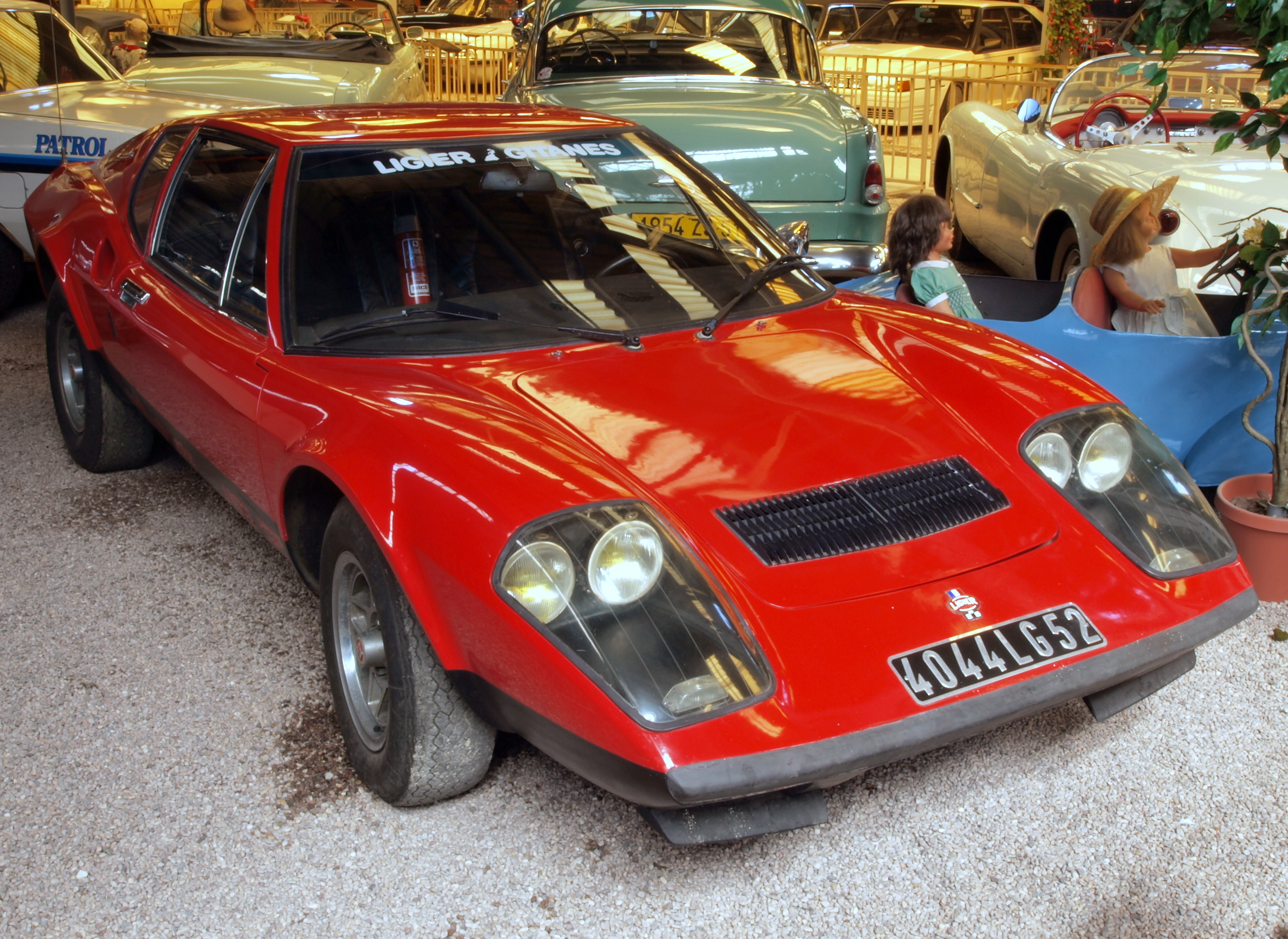
- 1974 Ligier JS2

Overview
- Manufacturer: Automobiles Ligier
- Production: 1971-1975
- Assembly: France: Abrest, Allier
- Designer: Pietro Frua

Body and chassis
- Class: Sports car
- Body style: 2-door coupé
- Layout: mid-engine, rear-wheel drive

Powertrain
- Engine: 2675 cc Maserati C114-1 DOHC V6; 2965 cc Maserati C114-11 DOHC V6
- Transmission: 5-speed manual

Dimensions
- Wheelbase: 2,350 mm (92.5 in)
- Length: 4,250 mm (167.3 in)
- Width: 1,720 mm (67.7 in)
- Height: 1,151 mm (45.3 in)
- Kerb weight: 980 kg (2,161 lb)

Chronology
- Predecessor: Ligier JS1

The Ligier JS2 is a mid-engined sports coupé that was built by Ligier in the French commune of Abrest near Vichy in the department of Allier between 1971 and 1975. Road-going and competition versions were built.

== Conception and predecessor ==
Guy Ligier and racing teammate, business partner and close friend Jo Schlesser talked about together building a car that overcame the shortcomings of the cars they were driving. Following Schlesser's death Ligier retired from racing and established Automobiles Ligier in 1968.

The JS2 was the company's second product, the first having been the JS1. That car was built on an aluminum chassis designed by Chief Engineer Michel Têtu with fibreglass bodywork by Frua. Four different engines were used at different times - two versions of the Cosworth FVA DOHC inline four-cylinder engine and two versions of the Ford Cologne OHV V6 engine. The Cosworths were mated to Hewland transaxles while the Fords were bolted to a modified transaxle from the Citroën SM. Due to there only ever being three JS1s built it was limited to racing in the Prototype class.

== History and features ==
To qualify to race in the GT class, 500 copies of a car had to have been built. Ligier's plan was to reach that goal with the JS2. The letters in the name of the car, like the JS1 before it, are a tribute to Schlesser.

The new car's appearance was similar to that of the JS1. Bodywork was again by Frua, but Guy Ligier insisted that the proportions of the cabin be adjusted so that the car was not too wide and had a low centre of gravity and good outward visibility. His requirement that it also be practical necessitated wide doors for ease of access and a usable trunk.

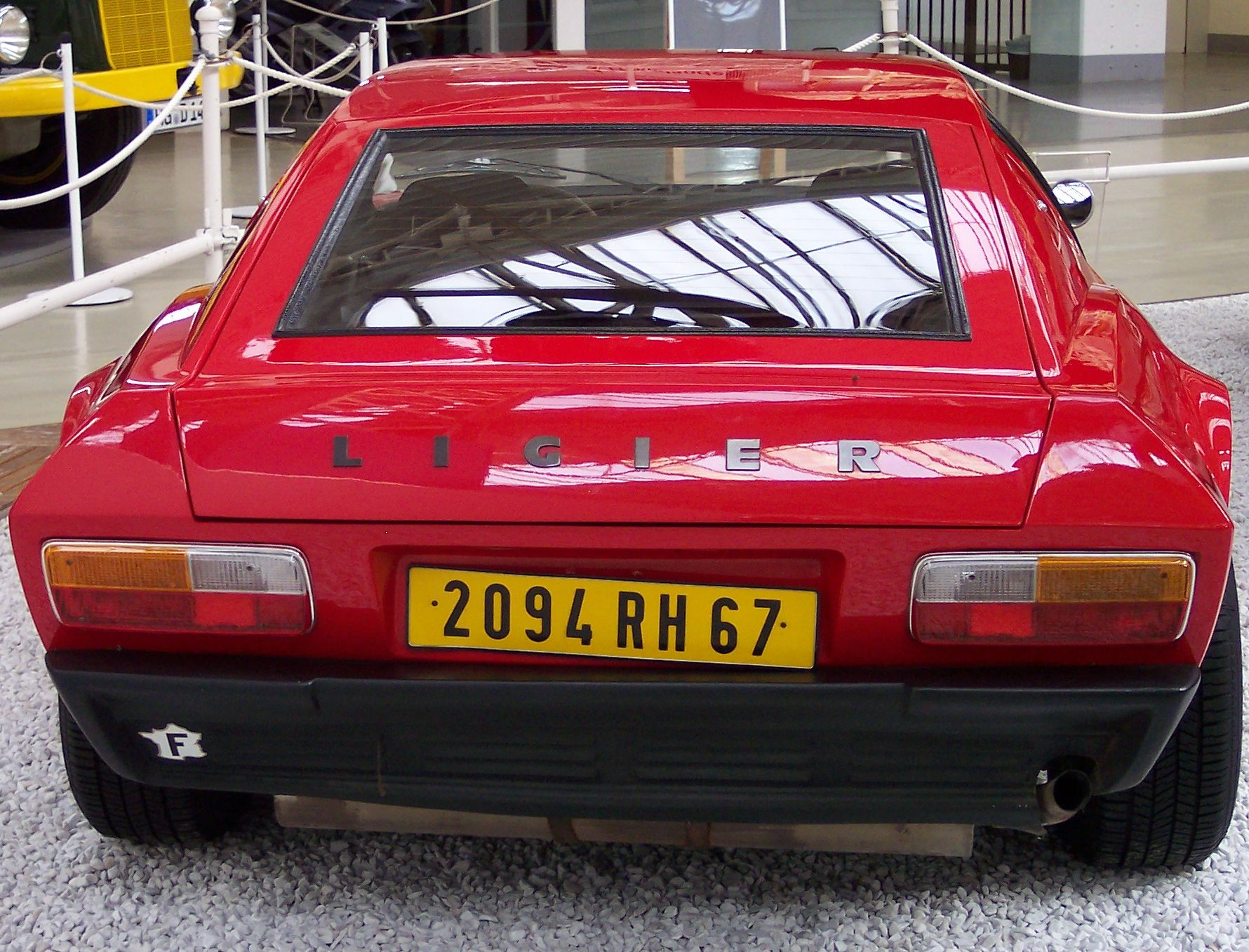
Rear view

The road-car was built on a backbone chassis made of a layer of polyurethane foam sandwiched between sheets of steel. Suspension was by wishbones and coil springs on all four corners. Braking was by power-assisted discs. Anti-roll bars were mounted front and rear. Minor components like door-handles and tail-lights were sourced from major brands like Peugeot and Citroën. Weight is variously given as 980 or 1030 kg.

The JS2's first public showing was at the 1970 Salon de l'Auto in Paris. This car was powered by a 2.6 litre Ford V6. Ford was planning on using this engine in their own GT70, a mid-engined sports coupé being developed as a smaller companion to their successful GT40. Ford declined to supply engines to Ligier for the JS2.

A deal was struck with Raymond Ravenel, managing director of Citroën, to use the Maserati C114 V6 from the SM in the JS2. This engine was designed by Giulio Alfieri of Maserati, which company Citroën had purchased in 1968. Alfieri produced a 90-degree DOHC V6 with hemispherical combustion chambers and 12 valves. Built from light alloy the engine displaced 2675 cc and weighed 140 kg (308.6 lb), but produced 170 CV (125 kW).

Têtu redesigned the rear cradle of the chassis to accommodate the Maserati engine, stretching the car by 50 mm. At the same time, Ligier had coachbuilders Pichon-Parat make some final revisions to the car's appearance. This revised JS2 with its new Italian motor debuted at the 1971 Salon de l'Auto. The car was priced at 74,000 francs (roughly US$13,350.00 at the time). The first cars were delivered in November 1972. 48 copies were built in 1972.

In February 1973 the JS2 received a larger C114 engine shared with the Maserati Merak. Displacement was now up to 2965 cc, power up 25 CV to 195 CV (143 kW), and the price up 500 francs to 74,500. 80 cars were built this year.

In 1974 Ligier entered into an agreement to sell their cars through Citroën's dealership network, which would also provide after-sales service. By the end of this year Citroën had also transferred assembly of the SM to Ligier's factory in Abrest. 114 copies of the JS2 were built in 1974.

In 1975 a revised "Series 2" JS2 debuted. The nose had been redesigned with hidden headlamps and the car received five-lug wheels. The price had risen to 80,000 francs. At the same time the 1973 Oil Crisis had caused the market for specialty vehicles to shrink dramatically. Only 7 of the Series 2 JS2s were built.

Citroën, facing severe financial difficulties, was eventually forced to merge with Peugeot. One of the casualties of the merger was to be the SM.

On May 22, 1975, Citroën issued an announcement saying that Maserati had been put into receivership. Control of the company eventually passed to De Tomaso, who would end production of the C114 V6, leaving Ligier without an engine for the JS2 and bringing production of the road-going model to an end.

== Motorsports ==
The racing version of the JS2, like the JS1, used a chassis made of aluminum instead of steel.

- 1972 - At the Le Mans 24 hour race all the cars retired with engine trouble. There was one win at Rally of Bayonne, with a car driven by Jean-François Piot.

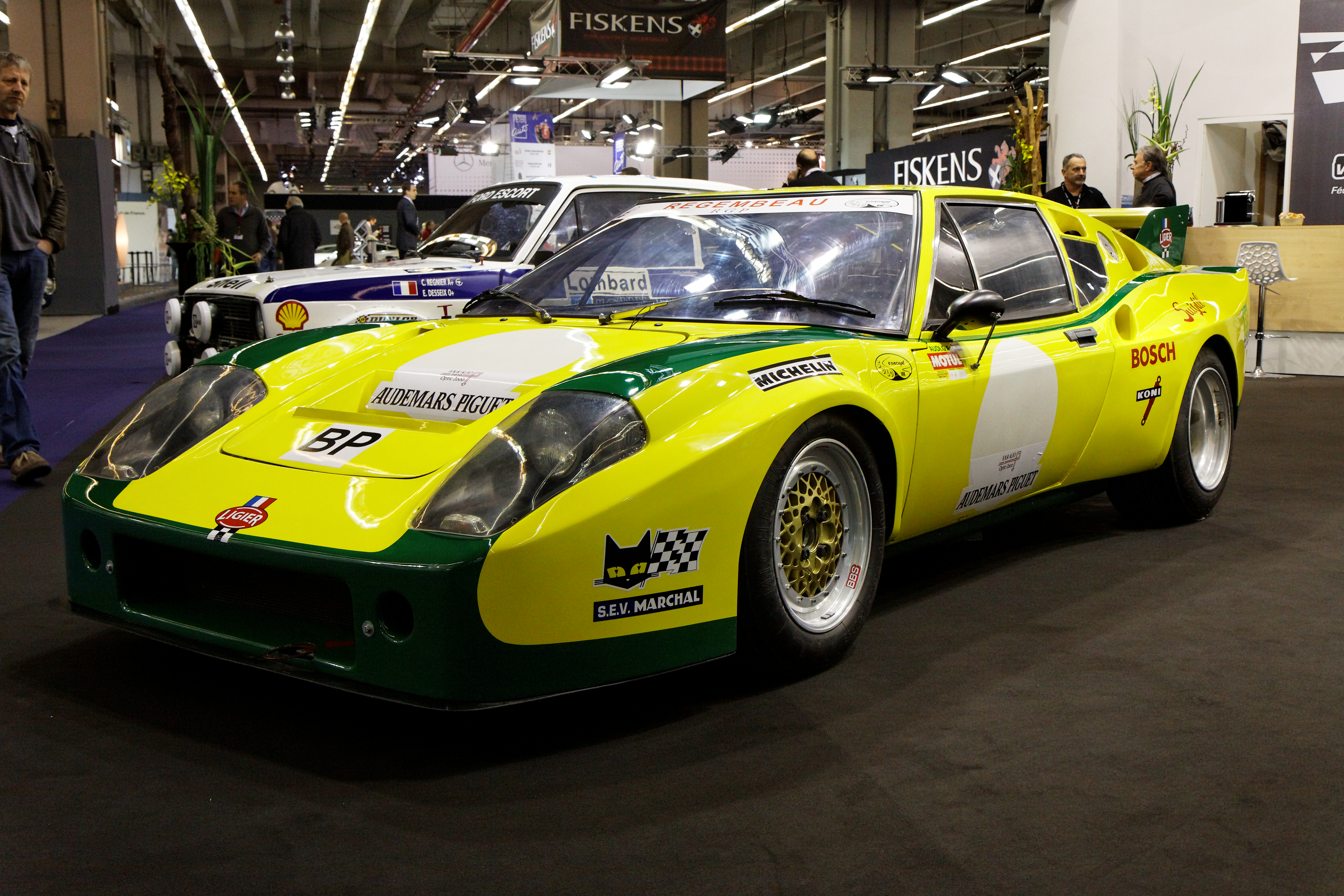
The 1973 Le Mans competitor, as driven by Laffite/Ligier

- 1973 - With the departure of Têtu for Autodelta Michel Beaujon assumed development responsibility for the racing JS2. The team sponsor was Citroën. There were improvements to the car's aerodynamics, including a new nose and rear spoiler. Maserati added a dry-sump to the engine and raised the power to 330 CV. Engine problems again led to the retirement of the two works cars at Le Mans, with the only JS2 finisher being a private entry driven by Martial Delalande, Jacques Marché and Claude Laurent. At the Tour de France the JS2 team of Gérard Larrousse and Guy Chasseuil won 14 of the 17 stages, only to be knocked out of the running by a distributor failure.
- 1974 - The team was sponsored by Total S.A. Chasseuil started the season with an outright win at the Le Mans 4 hour race. JS2s ran in most of the World Championship races but with only limited success. Jacques Lafitte and Alain Serpaggi managed an eight place finish at the Le Mans 24 hour race. The Tour de France race at the season's end was the year's high point - JS2s finished first and second.
- 1975 - The team was sponsored by Gitanes. Two of the works JS2 entered this year had Cosworth DFV V8 engines installed in the place of the Maserati units. At the Le Mans 24 hour race the two Cosworth powered cars and one Maserati powered car started. The Cosworth-powered car of Lafosse and Chasseuil fought a race-long battle with the Mirage of Derek Bell and Jacky Ickx but ultimately finished in second place. This would be their best showing at the Le Mans 24 hour race and also the last outing for the JS2 in competition; Ligier's attention had turned to Formula One.

Other French racing drivers who piloted Ligier JS2s include Guy Ligier himself, as well as Michel Leclère, Henri Pescarolo, François Migault, Jean-Pierre Beltoise, and Jean-Pierre Jarier.

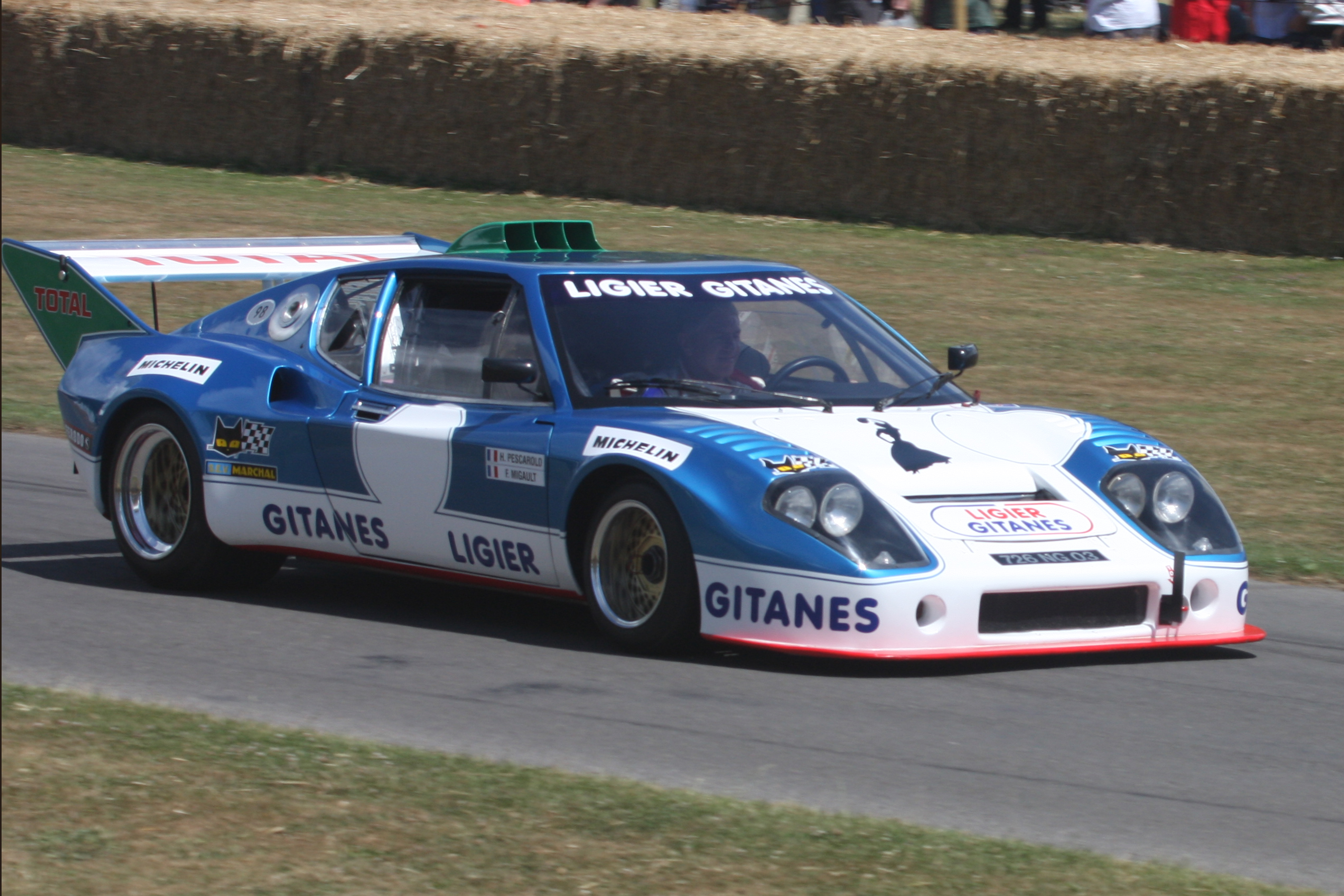
The 1975 racing JS2

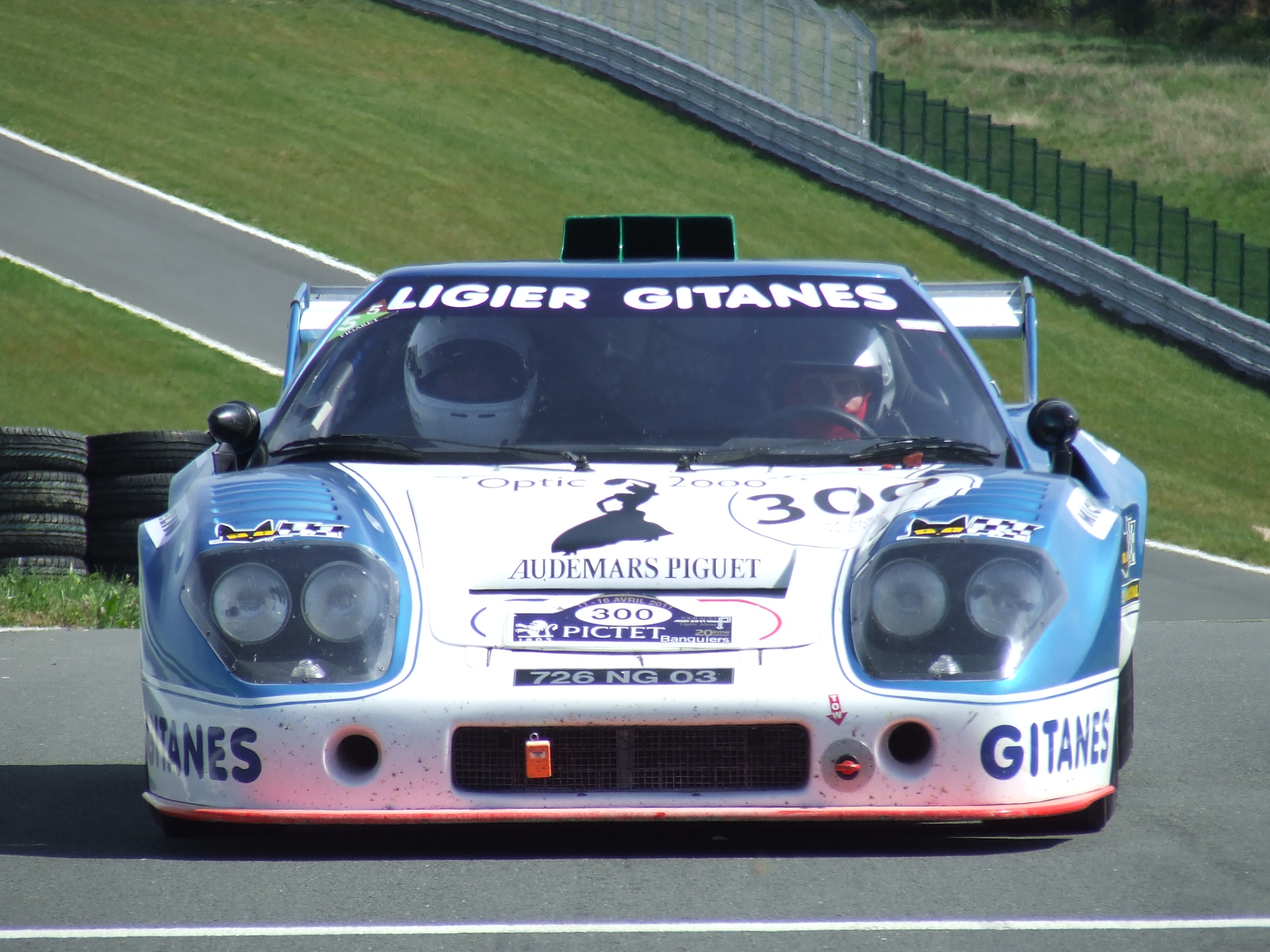
JS2 at 2011 Tour Auto Historique
