= Larrousse LH95 =

- Category: Formula One
- Constructor: Larrousse
- Designers: Robin Herd (Technical Director); Michel Têtu (Chief Designer); Tim Holloway (Chief Engineer); Tino Belli (Head of Aerodynamics)
- Predecessor: LH94

Technical specifications
- Chassis: Carbon fibre composite monocoque
- Suspension (front): Double wishbone, pushrod, inboard coil spring/damper
- Suspension (rear): Double wishbone, pushrod, inboard coil spring/damper
- Wheelbase: 2,940 mm (116 in)
- Engine: Ford ED, 3-litre 75° V8, NA, mid-engine, longitudinally mounted
- Transmission: Transverse 6-speed semi-automatic
- Weight: 520 kg (1,150 lb)
- Fuel: Elf
- Tyres: Goodyear

Competition history
- Notable entrants: Junior Larrousse F1
Races	Wins	Poles	F/Laps
0	0	0	0
- Constructors' Championships: 0
- Drivers' Championships: 0

The Larrousse LH95 was the car with which the Larrousse team planned to compete in the 1995 Formula One season. Due to lack of funds, the car was built and tested once before the team withdrew from Formula One in April 1995.

== Conception ==
The LH95 was conceived by Larrousse's chief designer Robin Herd during the team's final Formula One campaign in 1994. Though Herd designed the car, the team's money problems meant that only one was built but never raced.

The team appeared on the entry list for the 1995 season, but needed to merge with an organisation with an available F1 chassis in order to compete. There were two options in Lola, which had built Larrousse's chassis from 1987 to 1991, and French International Formula 3000 team DAMS, which was in possession of a Reynard-designed F1 chassis with which it hoped to enter the sport in the future. However, the Lola option was unrealistic as the British manufacturer had fallen out with Larrousse some years before when the team failed to pay for its chassis, while Gérard Larrousse failed to come to an agreement with DAMS owner Jean-Paul Driot over the winter of 1994–95, Driot subsequently announcing that DAMS would not enter F1 in any capacity in 1995.

Larrousse consequently ordered the previous year's chassis, the LH94, to be modified to meet new technical regulations for 1995, whilst he waited to see if the French government would give the team financial support, as way of compensation for the fact that the so-called "Evin's Law" had banned possible revenue from tobacco and alcohol sponsorship. In the meantime, he was forced to sell his majority shareholding in the team to compatriots Laurent Barlesi and Jean Messaoudi, who had attempted but failed to enter their own F1 team for 1995. During this period, the team's potential driver line-up was in flux: Érik Comas, Emmanuel Collard, Elton Julian, Éric Hélary, Christophe Bouchut and Éric Bernard were all suggested as possible drivers.

Two weeks before the opening race of the season in Brazil, it was announced that Larrousse would not receive any government money. The following week, the team elected to miss the first two races of the season in Brazil and Argentina, reasoning that it was better to focus on building a new car than upgrading the LH94, which would have been expensive and difficult to achieve. However, the team's situation remained extremely difficult: Cosworth refused to supply engines without being paid; Gérard Larrousse's former partners Patrick Tambay and Michel Golay took legal action against him in France; and planned backing from Petronas was dependent on the team taking part in a Grand Prix.

One week before the San Marino Grand Prix, Larrousse announced his team's withdrawal from F1, blaming others for failing to produce promised funding. At the same time, he announced his intention to return to the sport for 1996, but the team's debts and lawsuits from former partners, drivers and suppliers made this impossible. The team's closure was a further blow to French motorsport, following the demise of the AGS team in 1991 and the takeover of the Ligier team by Flavio Briatore and Tom Walkinshaw in 1994.
