= Essen Motor Show =

Automotive trade fair in Essen, Germany

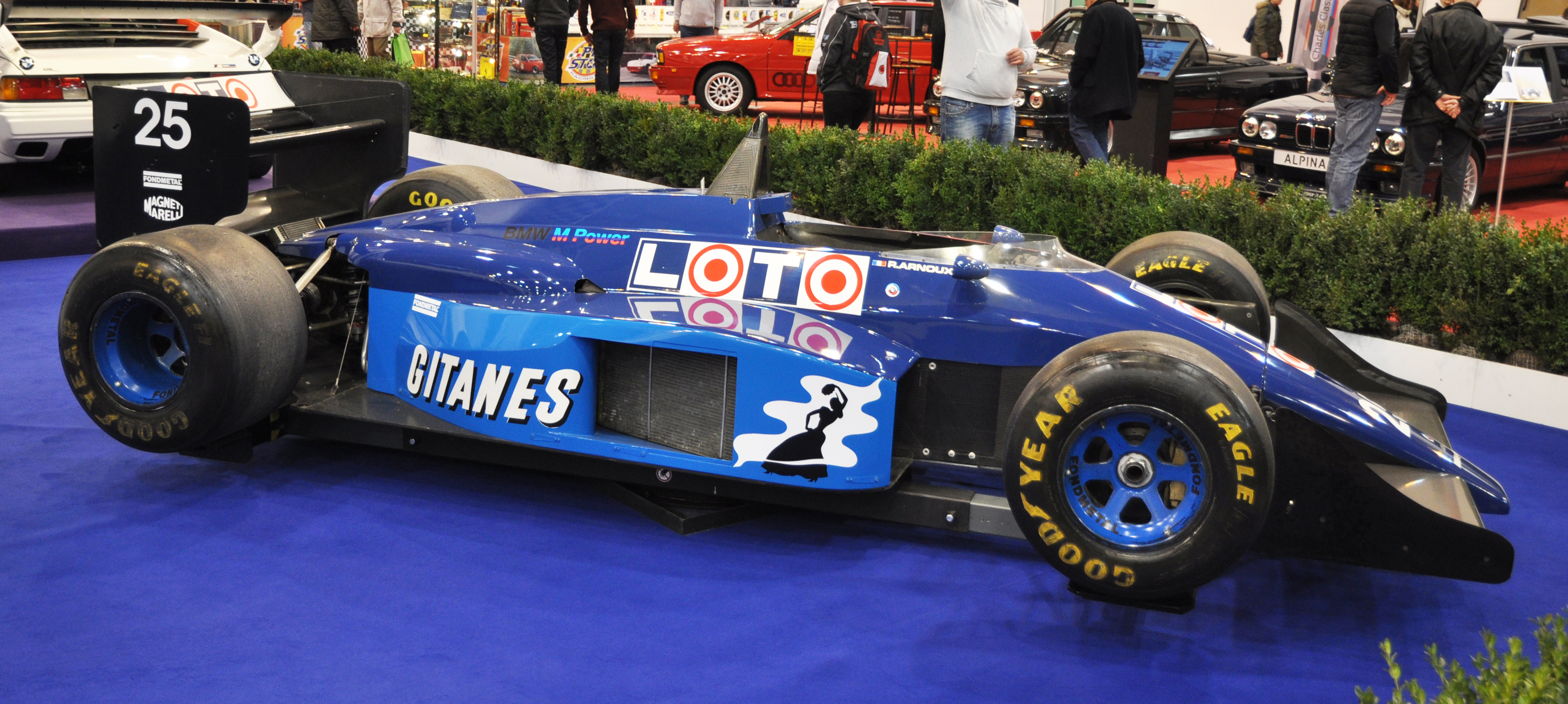
The Ligier JS29 at Essen Motor Show 2015

The Essen Motor Show is an auto show held annually in the city of Essen, Germany. It has been described as "the showcase event of the year for the tuning community" and as the German version of the annual SEMA auto show in Las Vegas. As contrasted with the Frankfurt Auto Show, the Essen show is smaller and is focused on car tuning and racing interests.

Essen Motor Show was the world's biggest car tuning fair before SEMA.

== History ==
The Essen Motor Show took place for the first time in 1968 under the alternative name "International Sports and Racing Car Exhibition Essen". The event was organised by car enthusiast Wolfgang Schoeller, who acts as the coordinator for the event today.

== See also ==
- North American International Auto Show
- Tokyo Auto Salon
