= Guy Ligier =

French racing driver (1930–2015)

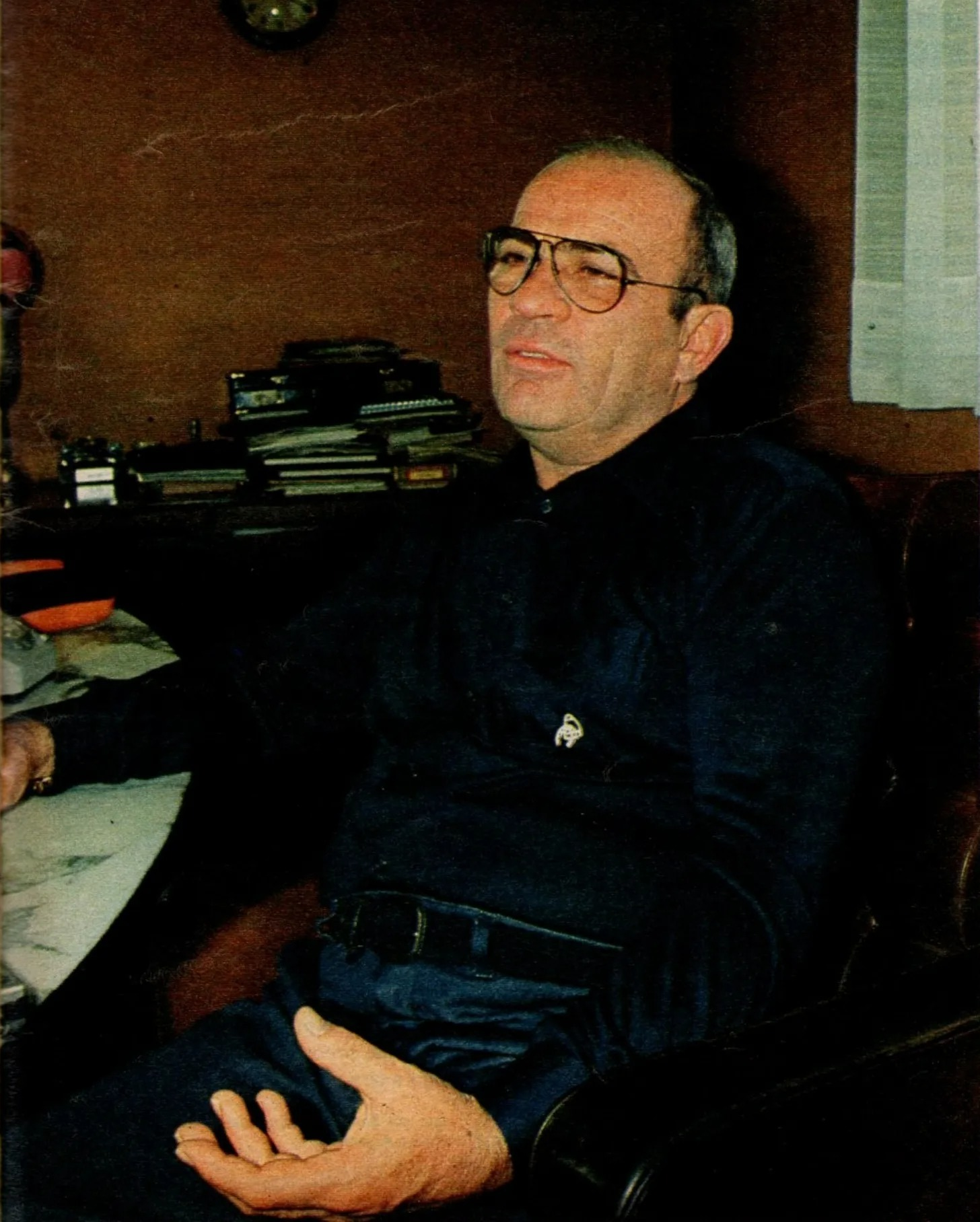
- Ligier in 1983
- Born: Guy Camille Ligier; 12 July 1930; Vichy, Allier, France
- Died: 23 August 2015 (aged 85); Nevers, Nièvre, France

Formula One World Championship career
- Nationality: (France) French
- Active years: 1966 – 1967
- Team(s): privateer Cooper, privateer Brabham
- Entries: 13 (12 starts)
- Championships: 0
- Wins: 0
- Podiums: 0
- Career points: 1
- Pole positions: 0
- Fastest laps: 0
- First entry: 1966 Monaco Grand Prix
- Last entry: 1967 Mexican Grand Prix

Guy Camille Ligier (French pronunciation: [ɡi ka.mij li.ʒje]; 12 July 1930 – 23 August 2015) was a French racing driver and team owner. He maintained many varied and successful careers over the course of his life, including rugby player, butcher, racing driver and Formula One team owner.

Ligier is the father of Philippe and Pascale Ligier and the grand father of Etienne Ligier former French motorsport hopeful.

== The early years ==
The son of a farmer, Ligier was orphaned at 7 years of age. He left school in his mid-teens and went to work as a butcher's assistant in his home town of Vichy.

Athletic and competitive, Ligier became a French rowing champion in 1947. He also had a passion for rugby and was good enough to play for the French Army during National Service earning a place on the French national B team. His rugby career was cut short due to injuries.

Determined to become successful, Ligier saved all of the money he earned working as a butcher to fund his aspirations. In 1960, he rented a backhoe and, a short time later, bought a bulldozer of his own and went into the construction business.

With help from Pierre Coulon, Vichy's Mayor, Ligier founded the public works company "Ligier Travaux Publics". With motorway construction booming in France, Ligier was able to rapidly expand his business. By 1961, he had 1200 employees and 500 machines and had also diversified into bridges, dams and development. During this period, his business contacts allowed him to make important friends in (then) local politicians François Mitterrand and Pierre Bérégovoy.

When his rugby career ended, Ligier switched to racing but on motorcycles. He would win the French Motorbike Championship in the 500cc class riding a Norton Manx "LA" in 1959 and in 1960.

== Racing driver ==
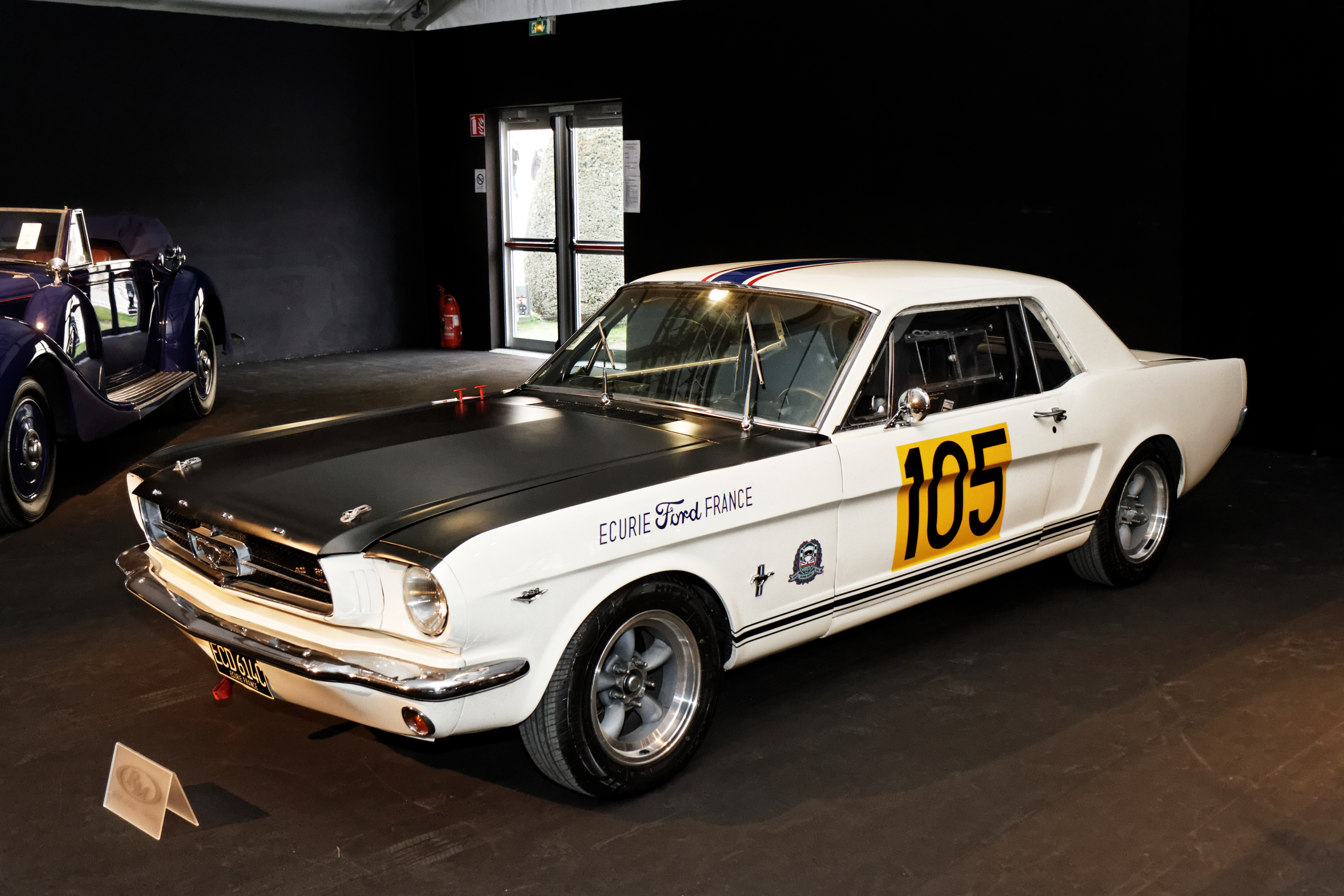
Ford Mustang GT350 of the 1965 Ford France team.

Ligier made an early foray into auto racing with a Simca 1300 at the 1957 Parisian Salon Cups in Montlhéry, but it was in 1960 that he first tried his hand at single-seater racing with a Formula Junior Elva-DKW, which he drove at Monaco and Montlhéry.

By 1964, Ligier was racing Porsche sportscars as part of Auguste Veuillet's team, starting with a 356 and then a 904 Carrera GTS, in which he placed seventh with Robert Buchet at the 1964 24 Hours of Le Mans. That same year, Ford France signed Ligier to drive one of two Formula 2 Brabham BT6 cars. These were year-old models, but one would be replaced by a newer Brabham BT10 during the season. Ligier's teammate was Jo Schlesser. Ligier finished fifth in his debut at Enna-Pergusa. So at the relatively late age of 34 Ligier began his "real" career as a driver.

In 1965, Ligier won the 24th Grand Prix de Albi Sports in a GT40 for Ford. In 1966, he drove Shelby Mustang GT350 chassis 5R209 rented to Martial Delalande to a second-place finish in the 14th "Rallye des Routes du Nord".

Ligier broke into Formula One as a privateer, entering his own Cooper-Maserati T81 in the 1966 Monaco Grand Prix. In five starts with this car, he either ran unclassified or out of the points. That year, he and Schlesser also joined forces to become the exclusive importer of Ford-Shelby products to France.

Teaming with Schlesser in a Ford France GT40 again that year produced good results – a fifth-place finish at the Nürburgring 1000 km. Although his year was ended by a knee broken while practicing for the German GP, things could have been worse. Following the crash doctors had wanted to amputate and it was only through the intervention of Schlesser that the leg was saved.

In 1967, Ligier fielded another car of his own, a Brabham-Repco BT20, in the British Grand Prix. His sixth-place finish in Germany produced the only championship point of his F1 career. Ligier also won the 12 Hours of Reims when sharing a GT40 Mk IIB with Schlesser.

In 1968, Ligier drove a Ford Escort TC in the Coupes de Vitesse. That was the same year that Ford France was winding down its motorsports involvement, so Ligier partnered with Schlesser and José Behra to launch Ecurie InterSport with a pair of McLaren Formula 2 cars. Schlesser was killed that year in his Formula One debut at the French Grand Prix while at the wheel of the magnesium-bodied air-cooled Honda RA302 Formula One car. The shocking loss of his friend prompts Ligier to retire from racing.

Ligier had one outing in a Ford Escort TC in the 1969 Coupes de l'ACIF, but he returned to regular competition in 1970 for the 24 Hours of Le Mans in a car bearing his own name, the Ligier JS1, and continued to participate in various endurance races with his own cars until 1974.

In total, Ligier participated in thirteen Grand Prix Formula 1 races, getting one point in the drivers' world championship with an eighth-place finish in the German Grand Prix in 1966 due to the two finishers in front of him being F2 cars, and so ineligible for F1 points.

== Other racing wins ==
- GT Class win in Coupes du Salon 1963 (de Montlhéry, in a Porsche 356 Carrera);
- 1964 Coupes de vitesse (de Montlhéry, in a Porsche 904 GTS);
- Magny-Cours 1965 (in a Ford GT40);
- Grand Prix d'Albi 1965 (in a Ford GT40, hors championnat d'Europe);
- Class S win (3L) at 1000 kilometres of Nürburgring 1966 in a Ford GT40 with Schlesser (fifth);
- Class S win (>2L) at 1000 kilometres of Monza 1967 in a Ford GT40 with Schlesser (sixth);
- 12 Heures de Reims, 1967 in a Ford Mk.IIB with Schlesser;
- Special Class win in 1969 Coupes de vitesse (Montlhéry, in a Ford Escort TC).

== Constructor and team owner ==
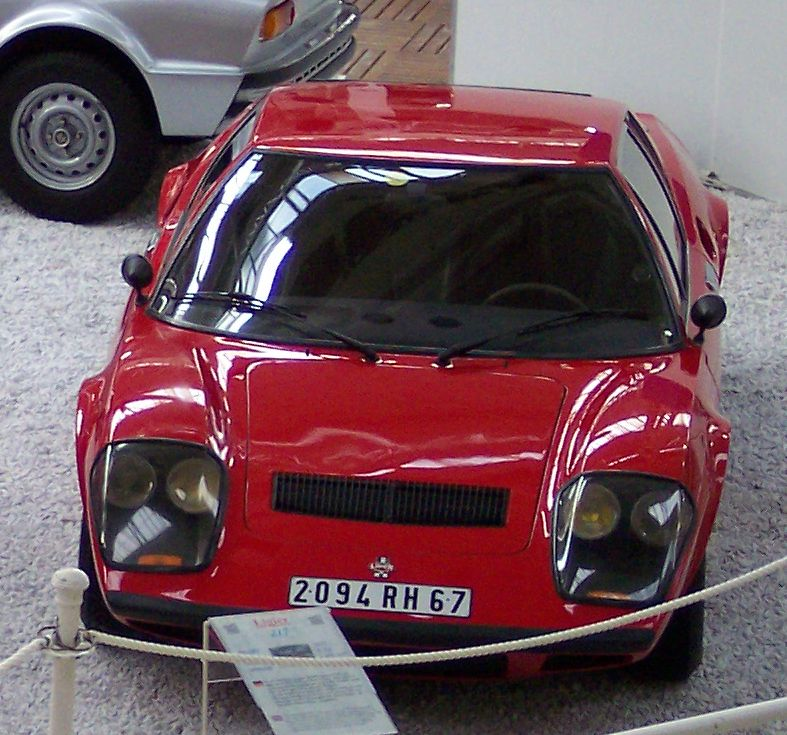
Ligier JS2

In 1968, Ligier established "Ligier Cars" to build his own sports-racing cars in fulfillment of the dream that he and former teammate, business partner and close friend, the late Jo Schlesser had shared to build a "good car". Ligier hired Michel Têtu to design the cars, and the first car produced was the JS1 prototype, the "JS" in this and all subsequent names being a tribute to Schlesser. Only three JS1s were built before production switched to its successor, the JS2.

The JS3 racing prototype was actually built in the time between the JS1 and JS2. Following limited success in the sports-racing field Ligier turned his attention to Formula 1 when he bought the assets of Equipe Matra Sports. With the experienced team, including designer Gerard Ducarouge and the Matra V12 engine Ligier formed Équipe Ligier in 1976. The team became successful in the early 1980s with drivers Jacques Laffite, Patrick Depailler and Didier Pironi.

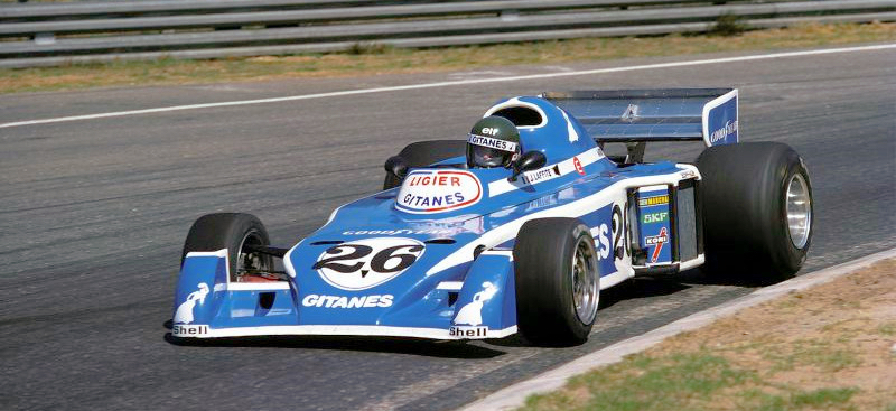
Jacques Laffite in a JS5 – 1976.

In 1981, Ligier's old friend François Mitterrand became President of France. When Ligier ran into trouble in 1983 the President ordered that government-owned companies such as Elf, Gitanes and Loto should supply sponsorship. Ligier also had preferential treatment when it came to engines, political pressure being applied to Renault to force the company to supply the team, which used Renault engines from 1984 to 1986 and from 1992 to 1994. However, this did not always give them the latest and greatest of the available Renault engines. Due to exclusive contracts with Lotus during the original turbo era (1977-1988) and with Williams in the 3.5L era (1989-1994), Ligier usually only got the previous year's engines to race, though with the demise of the Renault factory team after 1985, Ligier would (from about halfway through the season) get the newest engines along with Lotus in 1986.

The Ligier-Mitterrand-Bérégovoy alliance reached its peak in the early 1990s with the reconstruction of the Magny-Cours racing circuit as a new headquarters for Ligier and as a racing circuit to host the French Grand Prix. President Mitterrand and Prime Minister Bérégovoy backed the idea.

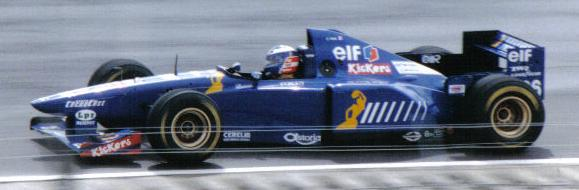
Oliver Panis in 1995.

At the 1996 Grand Prix of Monaco, driver Olivier Panis won the ninth and final Formula 1 victory for Ligier.

Equipe Ligier managed to contest 326 Grand Prix races, make 50 podium appearances and nine victories, claim second place in the 1980 World Championship and build over 20 Formula 1 cars.

== Post-Formula 1 life ==
Following the demise of the Monica car company in 1975, Ligier purchased the French assets and remaining unassembled vehicles. Ligier did not resume production of the Monica.

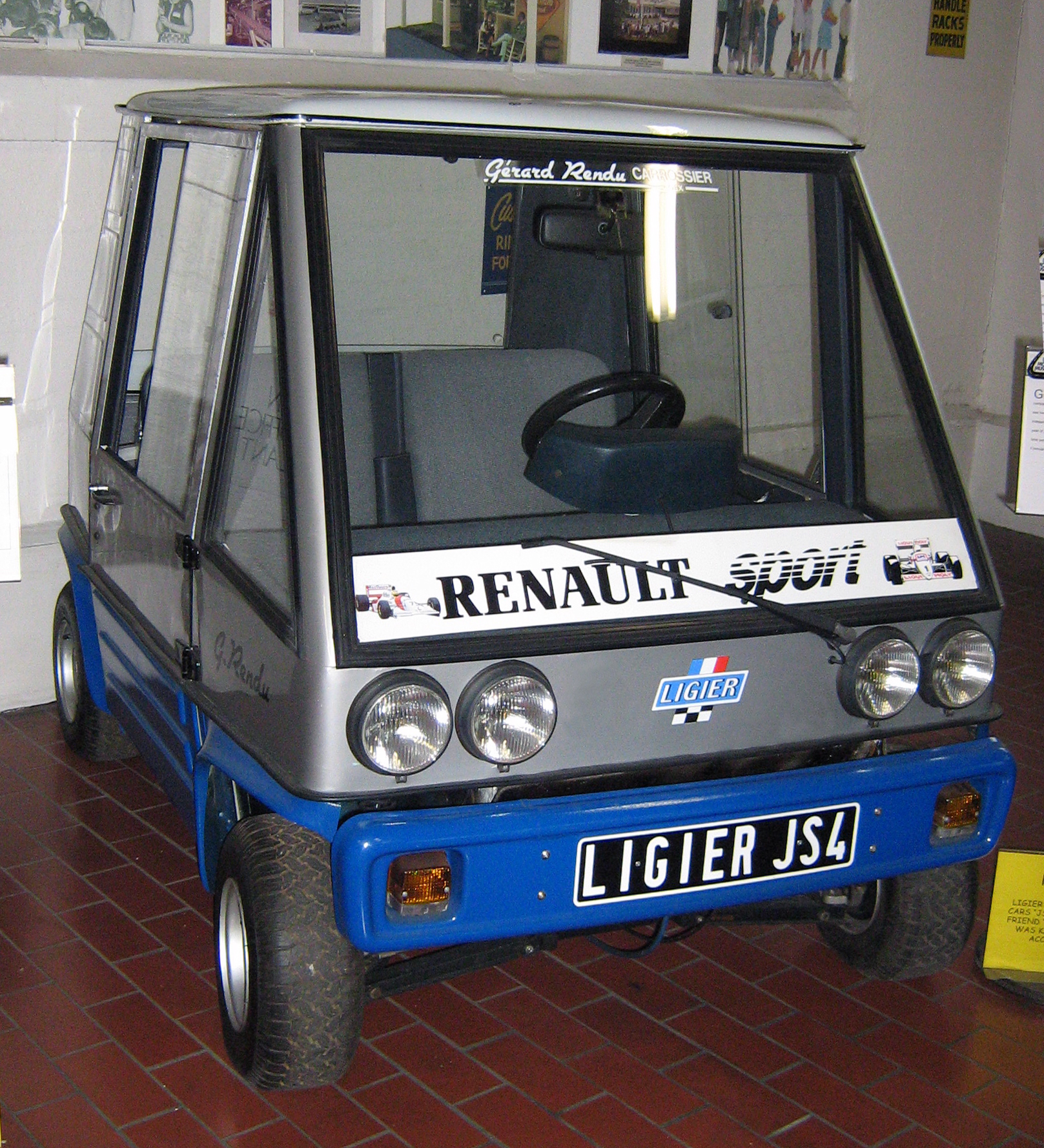
1980 Ligier JS4, the company's first microcar

Having built a variety of sports-racing and Formula 1 cars, Ligier began to diversify his automobile company in the 1980s. Beginning with tractor cabs, the Ligier Group later began production of "voitures sans permis" or "voiturettes", a class of microcar in France that may be driven without an operator's license, with the release of the Ligier JS4. The two-door JS4 has a nearly cubic steel monococque and a glass rear door, and was originally equipped with a 49 cc Motobécane engine. It was short and quite wide, reflecting recent legal changes allowing "voitures sans permis" to seat two rather than just one.

In 1992, Ligier realized that the socialist government would not last forever and sold his team to Cyril de Rouvre (The team was sold again in 1994 to Flavio Briatore). Ligier used the money from the sale to corner the market in natural fertilizer in central France and set about building another fortune.

Within a few months Mitterrand's Socialist Party experienced a major loss in the elections and Bérégovoy committed suicide on 1 May 1993. Ligier remained involved with the old Formula 1 team in an ambassadorial role until it was sold yet again, this time to Alain Prost in February 1997 and renamed Prost Grand Prix.

In 2004, Ligier acquired a majority shareholding in Automobiles Martini, adding his "Ligier JS" naming to new models such as the Ligier JS49, JS51 and JS53.

The name Ligier returned to the motor racing spotlight in 2014 when Jacques Nicolet's Onroak Automotive began building cars. Some were campaigned by Nicolet's own OAK Racing, which fielded a Ligier JS P2 prototype running in FIA World Endurance Championship and 24 Hours of Le Mans with Nicolet and Jean-Marc Merlin driving.

Ligier's son had also become a constructor of Formula 3 cars.

Following his death on 23 August 2015 in Nevers, his funeral took place at the church of St. Blaise de Vichy on 28 August 2015.

Ligier was survived by his wife and their two children, son Philippe and daughter Pascale.

== Honours ==
Member/Chevalier of the Legion of Honour.

== Racing record ==
=== 24 Hours of Le Mans results ===
Year	Team	Co-Drivers	Car	Class	Laps	Pos.	Class Pos.
1964	(France) Auguste Veuillet	(France) Robert Buchet	Porsche 904/4 GTS	GT; 2.0	323	7th	1st
1965	Ford France S.A.	(France) Maurice Trintignant	Ford GT40	P 5.0	11	DNF	DNF
1966	Ford France S.A.	(United States) Bob Grossman	Ford GT40	S 5.0	205	DNF	DNF
1967	Ford France S.A.	(France) Jo Schlesser	Ford Mk IIB	P +5.0	183	DNF	DNF
1970	(France) Automobiles Ligier	(France) Jean-Claude Andruet	Ligier JS1-Ford Cosworth	P 2.0	65	DNF	DNF
1971	(France) Automobiles Ligier	(France) Patrick Depailler	Ligier JS3-Ford Cosworth	P 3.0	270	NC	NC
1972	(France) Automobiles Ligier	(France) Jean-François Piot	Ligier JS2-Maserati	S 3.0	7	DNF	DNF
1973	(France) Automobiles Ligier	(France) Jacques Laffite	Ligier JS2-Maserati	S 3.0	24	DSQ	DSQ

=== Formula One World Championship results ===
(key)

Year	Entrant	Chassis	Engine	1	2	3	4	5	6	7	8	9	10	11	WDC	Pts
1966	Guy Ligier	Cooper T81	Maserati 9/F1 3.0 V12	MON; NC	BEL; NC	FRA; NC	GBR; 10	NED; 9	GER; DNS	ITA	USA	MEX			NC	0
1967	Guy Ligier	Cooper T81	Maserati 9/F1 3.0 V12	RSA	MON	NED	BEL; 10	FRA; NC							19th	1
1967	Guy Ligier	Brabham BT20	Repco 620 3.0 V8						GBR; 10	GER; 8^{1}	CAN	ITA; Ret	USA; Ret	MEX; 11	19th	1

Notes

- ^1 – Ligier finished 8th in the 1967 German Grand Prix, but was awarded the point for 6th place as the two F2 drivers who finished ahead of him on the road were ineligible to score points

=== Formula One Non-Championship results ===
(key)

Year	Entrant	Chassis	Engine	1	2	3	4	5	6
1966	Guy Ligier	Cooper T81	Maserati 9/F1 3.0 V12	RSA	SYR; NC	INT; DNS	OUL		
1967	Guy Ligier	Cooper T81	Maserati 9/F1 3.0 V12	ROC; DNS	SPR	INT; Ret	SYR	OUL	ESP

=== Complete European Formula Two Championship results ===
(key)

Year	Entrant	Chassis	Engine	1	2	3	4	5	6	7	8	9	Pos.	Pts
1968	Ecurie Inter-Sport	McLaren M4A	Ford	HOC; Ret	THR; 8	JAR; Ret	PAL; DNS	TUL	ZAN	PER	HOC	VAL	NC	0

== Other references ==
- LIGIER Sport & Prototypes 1969–1975 et 2014 by Jean-Marc Teissedre. Language: French. ISBN 978-2360590520
- Guy Ligier (French) Paperback – 1976 by Jean-Pierre Gosselin. Publisher: Solar (1976). Language: French. ISBN 978-2263000119
- L'Épopée Ligier en Formule 1 (French) Paperback. ISBN 979-1028301255 – ASIN: B01GFJZI56
