= Ligier JS1 =

- Category: Prototype
- Constructor: Automobiles Ligier
- Designer: Michel Têtu
- Predecessor: None
- Successor: Ligier JS2

Technical specifications
- Chassis: aluminum/polyurethane backbone
- Suspension (front): upper and lower wishbones, coilover-dampers, disc brakes.
- Suspension (rear): upper and lower wishbones, coilover-dampers, disc brakes.
- Length: 3,950 mm (155.5 in)
- Width: 1,680 mm (66.1 in)
- Height: 1,110 mm (43.7 in)
- Axle track: 1,380 mm (54.3 in); 1,360 mm (53.5 in)
- Wheelbase: 2,300 mm (90.6 in)
- Engine: 1,598 cc (97.5 cu in) Cosworth FVA; 1,790 cc (109.2 cu in) Cosworth FVC; 2,397 cc (146.3 cu in) Ford/Weslake V6; 2,637 cc (160.9 cu in) Ford RS2.6 V6
- Transmission: Hewland; Citroën SM 5-speed
- Weight: 790 kg (1,741.7 lb)
- Brakes: Disc/disc

Competition history
- Notable drivers: Guy Ligier; Jean-Claude Andruet
- Debut: 1969 Criterium des Cévennes
- First win: Albi, 1970
- Last win: 1970 Coupes de Vitesse
- Last event: 1970 Tour de France
Entries	Races	Wins
10	8	2

The Ligier JS1 is a sports-racing car that debuted in 1969 and was built by Automobiles Ligier. The car competed in various sportscar racing events during the 1969 and 1970 seasons.

== Background ==
Guy Ligier was a French former athlete and successful businessman who began a career as a professional racing driver at 34 years of age. Ligier enjoyed many successes when partnered with fellow countryman Jo Schlesser driving Ford GT40s. The two men became friends and eventually went into business together, launching their own team, Ecurie InterSport. Ongoing mechanical problems with the various cars they drove moved Schlesser to ask Ligier "What if we did our own cars?"

The question would not be answered before Schlesser's untimely death in practice at what was to have been his Formula 1 debut at the French Grand Prix in 1968. Following Schlesser's death, Ligier retired from racing to pursue the production of his own sports-racing cars.

Ligier founded Automobiles Ligier in 1968, and in 1969 hired engineer/designer Michel Têtu, who had previously worked for Charles Deutsch, to design the cars. The JS1 was the first product of the new company, and was named in honour of Jo Schlesser.

The JS1 was officially unveiled in September 1969 at the Salon de l'Auto in Paris.

== Technical details ==
The JS1 was a two-door fixed-head mid-engined coupé. The body was designed by Pietro Frua and executed in fibreglass, but Ligier had considerable input into the details of his first car. His requirements that the car be light and compact but with good forward visibility from the cabin resulted in the JS1 having a large cockpit and big, sloping windshield.

Têtu's chassis was similar in principle to the contemporary Lotus Europa and Alpine A110, being a central backbone with additional structures front and rear to accommodate suspension and engine. Steel had been considered for use in the chassis but in the end Têtu employed a polyurethane Klegecell core sandwiched between aluminum panels.

The suspension used wishbones with coilover-damper units on all corners. The brakes were discs on all four wheels. Steering was by rack-and-pinion.

The first engine used in the car was a 1598 cc Cosworth FVA producing 220 bhp. Power went to the wheels through a 5-speed Hewland transaxle.

== Racing ==
Guy Ligier drove the JS1 in its 1969 debut race at the Critérium des Cévennes but retired due to a failed engine mount.

The next year the FVA engine was replaced by a 1790 cc Cosworth FVC that developed approximately 240 hp.

1970 brought wins at Albi and Montlhéry. For the 24 Hours of Le Mans Ligier's driving partner was Jean-Claude Andruet. The car ran in the Prototype class. The pair qualified in 13th place and were among the first ten in the overall ranking when they were forced to retire after eight hours with a distributor problem.

For the Tour Auto Ligier entered a two-car team with both cars having different versions of the Ford Cologne V6. One car received a 2637 cc 2.6 RS engine from the Ford Capri RS2600, while the second car received a 2397 cc V6 with Weslake alloy cylinder heads. Extensive changes were made to the chassis to fit the new engines, and the Hewland transaxle used with the Cosworth engines gave way to a new 5-speed unit from the Citroën SM. Both cars retired.

Only three JS1s were ever built. Work began on its successor, the JS2, as early as 1970. The only known surviving JS1, chassis 002, has been fully restored and has appeared at various historical racing events since 2004.
