= Renault Grand Prix results =

These are the complete Grand Prix racing results of Renault as a constructor.

== Complete Formula One results ==
=== As a constructor ===
==== Turbo era (1977–1985) ====
(key)

Year	Chassis	Engine	Tyres	Drivers	1	2	3	4	5	6	7	8	9	10	11	12	13	14	15	16	17	Points	WCC
1977	RS01	EF1 1.5 V6 t	M		ARG	BRA	RSA	USW	ESP	MON	BEL	SWE	FRA	GBR	GER	AUT	NED	ITA	USA	CAN	JPN	0	NC
1977	RS01	EF1 1.5 V6 t	M	(France) Jean-Pierre Jabouille										Ret			Ret	Ret	Ret	DNQ		0	NC
1978	RS01	EF1 1.5 V6 t	M		ARG	BRA	RSA	USW	MON	BEL	ESP	SWE	FRA	GBR	GER	AUT	NED	ITA	USA	CAN		3	12th
1978	RS01	EF1 1.5 V6 t	M	(France) Jean-Pierre Jabouille			Ret	Ret	10	NC	13	Ret	Ret	Ret	Ret	Ret	Ret	Ret	4	12		3	12th
1979	RS01; RS10	EF1 1.5 V6 t	M		ARG	BRA	RSA	USW	ESP	BEL	MON	FRA	GBR	GER	AUT	NED	ITA	CAN	USA			26	6th
1979	RS01; RS10	EF1 1.5 V6 t	M	(France) Jean-Pierre Jabouille	Ret	10	Ret^{P}	DNS	Ret	Ret	NC	1^{P}	Ret	Ret^{P}	Ret	Ret	14^{P}	Ret	Ret			26	6th
1979	RS01; RS10	EF1 1.5 V6 t	M	(France) René Arnoux	Ret	Ret	Ret	DNS	9	Ret	Ret	3^{F}	2	Ret	6^{P}^{F}	Ret^{P}	Ret	Ret	2			26	6th
1980	RE20	EF1 1.5 V6 t	M		ARG	BRA	RSA	USW	BEL	MON	FRA	GBR	GER	AUT	NED	ITA	CAN	USA				38	4th
1980	RE20	EF1 1.5 V6 t	M	(France) Jean-Pierre Jabouille	Ret	Ret^{P}	Ret^{P}	NC	Ret	Ret	Ret	Ret	Ret	1	Ret	Ret	Ret					38	4th
1980	RE20	EF1 1.5 V6 t	M	(France) René Arnoux	Ret	1^{F}	1^{F}	9	4	Ret	5	NC	Ret	9^{P}^{F}	2^{P}^{F}	10^{P}	Ret	7				38	4th
1981	RE20B; RE30	EF1 1.5 V6 t	M		USW	BRA	ARG	SMR	BEL	MON	ESP	FRA	GBR	GER	AUT	NED	ITA	CAN	CPL			54	3rd
1981	RE20B; RE30	EF1 1.5 V6 t	M	(France) Alain Prost	Ret	Ret	3	Ret	Ret	Ret	Ret	1^{F}	Ret	2^{P}	Ret	1^{P}	1	Ret	2			54	3rd
1981	RE20B; RE30	EF1 1.5 V6 t	M	(France) René Arnoux	8	Ret	5	8	DNQ	Ret	9	4^{P}	9^{P}^{F}	13	2^{P}	Ret	Ret^{P}	Ret	Ret			54	3rd
1982	RE30B	EF1 1.5 V6 t	M		RSA	BRA	USW	SMR	BEL	MON	DET	CAN	NED	GBR	FRA	GER	AUT	SUI	ITA	CPL		62	3rd
1982	RE30B	EF1 1.5 V6 t	M	(France) Alain Prost	1^{F}	1^{P}^{F}	Ret	Ret	Ret^{P}	7	NC^{P}^{F}	Ret	Ret	6	2	Ret	8	2^{P}^{F}	Ret	4^{P}		62	3rd
1982	RE30B	EF1 1.5 V6 t	M	(France) René Arnoux	3^{P}	Ret	Ret	Ret^{P}	Ret	Ret^{P}	10	Ret	Ret^{P}	Ret	1^{P}	2	Ret	16	1^{F}	Ret		62	3rd
1983	RE30C; RE40	EF1 1.5 V6 t	M		BRA	USW	FRA	SMR	MON	BEL	DET	CAN	GBR	GER	AUT	NED	ITA	EUR	RSA			79	2nd
1983	RE30C; RE40	EF1 1.5 V6 t	M	(France) Alain Prost	7	11	1^{P}^{F}	2	3^{P}	1^{P}	8	5	1^{F}	4	1^{F}	Ret	Ret	2	Ret			79	2nd
1983	RE30C; RE40	EF1 1.5 V6 t	M	(United States) Eddie Cheever	Ret	13	3	Ret	Ret	3	Ret	2	Ret	Ret	4	Ret	3	10	6			79	2nd
1984	RE50	EF4 1.5 V6 t	M		BRA	RSA	BEL	SMR	FRA	MON	CAN	DET	DAL	GBR	GER	AUT	NED	ITA	EUR	POR		34	5th
1984	RE50	EF4 1.5 V6 t	M	(France) Patrick Tambay	5	Ret^{F}	7	Ret	2^{P}	Ret	WD	Ret	Ret	8	5	Ret	6	Ret	Ret	7		34	5th
1984	RE50	EF4 1.5 V6 t	M	(United Kingdom) Derek Warwick	Ret	3	2	4	Ret	Ret	Ret	Ret^{F}	Ret	2	3	Ret	Ret	Ret	11	Ret		34	5th
1984	RE50	EF4 1.5 V6 t	M	(France) Philippe Streiff																Ret		34	5th
1985	RE60; RE60B	EF4B 1.5 V6 t EF15 1.5 V6 t	G		BRA	POR	SMR	MON	CAN	DET	FRA	GBR	GER	AUT	NED	ITA	BEL	EUR	RSA	AUS		16	7th
1985	RE60; RE60B	EF4B 1.5 V6 t EF15 1.5 V6 t	G	(France) Patrick Tambay	5	3	3	Ret	7	Ret	6	Ret	Ret	10	Ret	7	Ret	12		Ret		16	7th
1985	RE60; RE60B	EF4B 1.5 V6 t EF15 1.5 V6 t	G	(United Kingdom) Derek Warwick	10	7	10	5	Ret	Ret	7	5	Ret	Ret	Ret	Ret	6	Ret		Ret		16	7th
1985	RE60; RE60B	EF4B 1.5 V6 t EF15 1.5 V6 t	G	(France) François Hesnault									Ret									16	7th
1986–2001: Renault did not compete as a constructor.

==== Return and first titles (2002–2009) ====
(key)

Year	Chassis	Engine	Tyres	Drivers	1	2	3	4	5	6	7	8	9	10	11	12	13	14	15	16	17	18	19	Points	WCC
2002	R202	RS22 3.0 V10	M		AUS	MAL	BRA	SMR	ESP	AUT	MON	CAN	EUR	GBR	FRA	GER	HUN	BEL	ITA	USA	JPN			23	4th
2002	R202	RS22 3.0 V10	M	(Italy) Jarno Trulli	Ret	Ret	Ret	9	10^{†}	Ret	4	6	8	Ret	Ret	Ret	8	Ret	4	5	Ret			23	4th
2002	R202	RS22 3.0 V10	M	(United Kingdom) Jenson Button	Ret	4	4	5	12^{†}	7	Ret	15^{†}	5	12^{†}	6	Ret	Ret	Ret	5	8	6			23	4th
2003	R23; R23B	RS23 3.0 V10	M		AUS	MAL	BRA	SMR	ESP	AUT	MON	CAN	EUR	FRA	GBR	GER	HUN	ITA	USA	JPN				88	4th
2003	R23; R23B	RS23 3.0 V10	M	(Italy) Jarno Trulli	5	5	8	13	Ret	8	6	Ret	Ret	Ret	6	3	7	Ret	4	5				88	4th
2003	R23; R23B	RS23 3.0 V10	M	(Spain) Fernando Alonso	7	3^{P}	3	6	2	Ret	5	4^{F}	4	Ret	Ret	4	1^{P}	8	Ret	Ret				88	4th
2004	R24	RS24 3.0 V10	M		AUS	MAL	BHR	SMR	ESP	MON	EUR	CAN	USA	FRA	GBR	GER	HUN	BEL	ITA	CHN	JPN	BRA		105	3rd
2004	R24	RS24 3.0 V10	M	(Italy) Jarno Trulli	7	5	4	5	3	1^{P}	4	Ret	4	4	Ret	11	Ret	9^{P}	10					105	3rd
2004	R24	RS24 3.0 V10	M	(Canada) Jacques Villeneuve																11	10	10		105	3rd
2004	R24	RS24 3.0 V10	M	(Spain) Fernando Alonso	3	7	6	4	4	Ret	5	Ret	Ret	2^{P}	10	3	3	Ret	Ret	4	5	4		105	3rd
2005	R25	RS25 3.0 V10	M		AUS	MAL	BHR	SMR	ESP	MON	EUR	CAN	USA	FRA	GBR	GER	HUN	TUR	ITA	BEL	BRA	JPN	CHN	191	1st
2005	R25	RS25 3.0 V10	M	(Spain) Fernando Alonso	3^{F}	1^{P}	1^{P}	1	2	4	1^{F}	Ret	DNS	1^{P}	2^{P}	1	11	2	2	2	3^{P}	3	1^{P}	191	1st
2005	R25	RS25 3.0 V10	M	(Italy) Giancarlo Fisichella	1^{P}	Ret	Ret	Ret	5^{F}	12	6	Ret	DNS	6	4	4	9	4	3	Ret	5	2	4	191	1st
2006	R26	RS26 2.4 V8	M		BHR	MAL	AUS	SMR	EUR	ESP	MON	GBR	CAN	USA	FRA	GER	HUN	TUR	ITA	CHN	JPN	BRA		206	1st
2006	R26	RS26 2.4 V8	M	(Spain) Fernando Alonso	1	2^{F}	1	2^{F}	2^{P}	1^{P}	1^{P}	1^{P}^{F}	1^{P}	5	2	5	Ret	2	Ret	2^{P}^{F}	1^{F}	2		206	1st
2006	R26	RS26 2.4 V8	M	(Italy) Giancarlo Fisichella	Ret	1^{P}	5	8	6	3	6	4	4	3	6	6	Ret	6	4	3	3	6		206	1st
2007	R27	RS27 2.4 V8	B		AUS	MAL	BHR	ESP	MON	CAN	USA	FRA	GBR	EUR	HUN	TUR	ITA	BEL	JPN	CHN	BRA			51	3rd
2007	R27	RS27 2.4 V8	B	(Italy) Giancarlo Fisichella	5	6	8	9	4	DSQ	9	6	8	10	12	9	12	Ret	5	11	Ret			51	3rd
2007	R27	RS27 2.4 V8	B	(Finland) Heikki Kovalainen	10	8	9	7	13^{†}	4	5	15	7	8	8	6	7	8	2	9	Ret			51	3rd
2008	R28	RS27-2008 2.4 V8	B		AUS	MAL	BHR	ESP	TUR	MON	CAN	FRA	GBR	GER	HUN	EUR	BEL	ITA	SIN	JPN	CHN	BRA		80	4th
2008	R28	RS27-2008 2.4 V8	B	(Spain) Fernando Alonso	4	8	10	Ret	6	10	Ret	8	6	11	4	Ret	4	4	1	1	4	2		80	4th
2008	R28	RS27-2008 2.4 V8	B	(Brazil) Nelson Piquet Jr.	Ret	11	Ret	Ret	15	Ret	Ret	7	Ret	2	6	11	Ret	10	Ret	4	8	Ret		80	4th
2009	R29	RS27-2009 2.4 V8	B		AUS	MAL	CHN	BHR	ESP	MON	TUR	GBR	GER	HUN	EUR	BEL	ITA	SIN	JPN	BRA	ABU			26	8th
2009	R29	RS27-2009 2.4 V8	B	(Spain) Fernando Alonso	5	11	9	8	5	7	10	14	7^{F}	Ret^{P}	6	Ret	5	3^{F}	10	Ret	14			26	8th
2009	R29	RS27-2009 2.4 V8	B	(Brazil) Nelson Piquet Jr.	Ret	13	16	10	12	Ret	16	12	13	12										26	8th
2009	R29	RS27-2009 2.4 V8	B	(France) Romain Grosjean											15	Ret	15	Ret	16	13	18			26	8th

==== Genii Capital management (2010–2011) ====
(key)

Year	Chassis	Engine	Tyres	Drivers	1	2	3	4	5	6	7	8	9	10	11	12	13	14	15	16	17	18	19	Points	WCC
2010	R30	RS27-2010 2.4 V8	B		BHR	AUS	MAL	CHN	ESP	MON	TUR	CAN	EUR	GBR	GER	HUN	BEL	ITA	SIN	JPN	KOR	BRA	ABU	163	5th
2010	R30	RS27-2010 2.4 V8	B	(Poland) Robert Kubica	11	2	4	5	8	3	6	7^{F}	5	Ret	7	Ret	3	8	7	Ret	5	9	5	163	5th
2010	R30	RS27-2010 2.4 V8	B	(Russia) Vitaly Petrov	Ret	Ret	Ret	7	11	13^{†}	15^{F}	17	14	13	10	5	9	13	11	Ret	Ret	16	6	163	5th
2011	R31	RS27-2011 2.4 V8	P		AUS	MAL	CHN	TUR	ESP	MON	CAN	EUR	GBR	GER	HUN	BEL	ITA	SIN	JPN	KOR	IND	ABU	BRA	73	5th
2011	R31	RS27-2011 2.4 V8	P	(Germany) Nick Heidfeld	12	3	12	7	8	8	Ret	10	8	Ret	Ret									73	5th
2011	R31	RS27-2011 2.4 V8	P	(Brazil) Bruno Senna												13	9	15	16	13	12	16	17	73	5th
2011	R31	RS27-2011 2.4 V8	P	(Russia) Vitaly Petrov	3	17^{†}	9	8	11	Ret	5	15	12	10	12	9	Ret	17	9	Ret	11	13	10	73	5th
2012–2015: Renault did not compete as a constructor.

==== Second return (2016–2020) ====
(key)

Year	Chassis	Engine	Tyres	Drivers	1	2	3	4	5	6	7	8	9	10	11	12	13	14	15	16	17	18	19	20	21	Points	WCC
2016	R.S.16	R.E.16 1.6 V6 t	P		AUS	BHR	CHN	RUS	ESP	MON	CAN	EUR	AUT	GBR	HUN	GER	BEL	ITA	SIN	MAL	JPN	USA	MEX	BRA	ABU	8	9th
2016	R.S.16	R.E.16 1.6 V6 t	P	(Denmark) Kevin Magnussen	12	11	17	7	15	Ret	16	14	14	17^{†}	15	16	Ret	17	10	Ret	14	12	17	14	Ret	8	9th
2016	R.S.16	R.E.16 1.6 V6 t	P	(United Kingdom) Jolyon Palmer	11	DNS	22	13	13	Ret	Ret	15	12	Ret	12	19	15	Ret	15	10	12	13	14	Ret	17	8	9th
2017	R.S.17	R.E.17 1.6 V6 t	P		AUS	CHN	BHR	RUS	ESP	MON	CAN	AZE	AUT	GBR	HUN	BEL	ITA	SIN	MAL	JPN	USA	MEX	BRA	ABU		57	6th
2017	R.S.17	R.E.17 1.6 V6 t	P	(Germany) Nico Hülkenberg	11	12	9	8	6	Ret	8	Ret	13	6	17^{†}	6	13	Ret	16	Ret	Ret	Ret	10	6		57	6th
2017	R.S.17	R.E.17 1.6 V6 t	P	(United Kingdom) Jolyon Palmer	Ret	13	13	Ret	15	11	11	Ret	11	DNS	12	13	Ret	6	15	12						57	6th
2017	R.S.17	R.E.17 1.6 V6 t	P	(Spain) Carlos Sainz Jr.																	7	Ret	11	Ret		57	6th
2018	R.S.18	R.E.18 1.6 V6 t	P		AUS	BHR	CHN	AZE	ESP	MON	CAN	FRA	AUT	GBR	GER	HUN	BEL	ITA	SIN	RUS	JPN	USA	MEX	BRA	ABU	122	4th
2018	R.S.18	R.E.18 1.6 V6 t	P	(Germany) Nico Hülkenberg	7	6	6	Ret	Ret	8	7	9	Ret	6	5	12	Ret	13	10	12	Ret	6	6	Ret	Ret	122	4th
2018	R.S.18	R.E.18 1.6 V6 t	P	(Spain) Carlos Sainz Jr.	10	11	9	5	7	10	8	8	12	Ret	12	9	11	8	8	17	10	7	Ret	12	6	122	4th
2019	R.S.19	E-Tech 19 1.6 V6 t	P		AUS	BHR	CHN	AZE	ESP	MON	CAN	FRA	AUT	GBR	GER	HUN	BEL	ITA	SIN	RUS	JPN	MEX	USA	BRA	ABU	91	5th
2019	R.S.19	E-Tech 19 1.6 V6 t	P	(Australia) Daniel Ricciardo	Ret	18^{†}	7	Ret	12	9	6	11	12	7	Ret	14	14	4	14	Ret	DSQ	8	6	6	11	91	5th
2019	R.S.19	E-Tech 19 1.6 V6 t	P	(Germany) Nico Hülkenberg	7	17^{†}	Ret	14	13	13	7	8	13	10	Ret	12	8	5	9	10	DSQ	10	9	15	12	91	5th
2020	R.S.20	E-Tech 20 1.6 V6 t	P		AUT	STY	HUN	GBR	70A	ESP	BEL	ITA	TUS	RUS	EIF	POR	EMI	TUR	BHR	SKH	ABU					181	5th
2020	R.S.20	E-Tech 20 1.6 V6 t	P	(Australia) Daniel Ricciardo	Ret	8	8	4	14	11	4^{F}	6	4	5	3	9	3	10	7	5	7^{F}					181	5th
2020	R.S.20	E-Tech 20 1.6 V6 t	P	(France) Esteban Ocon	8	Ret	14	6	8	13	5	8	Ret	7	Ret	8	Ret	11	9	2	9					181	5th

Notes

- ^{†} – The driver did not finish the Grand Prix, but was classified, as he completed over 90% of the race distance.
