= Renault EF-Type engine =

EF-Type engine
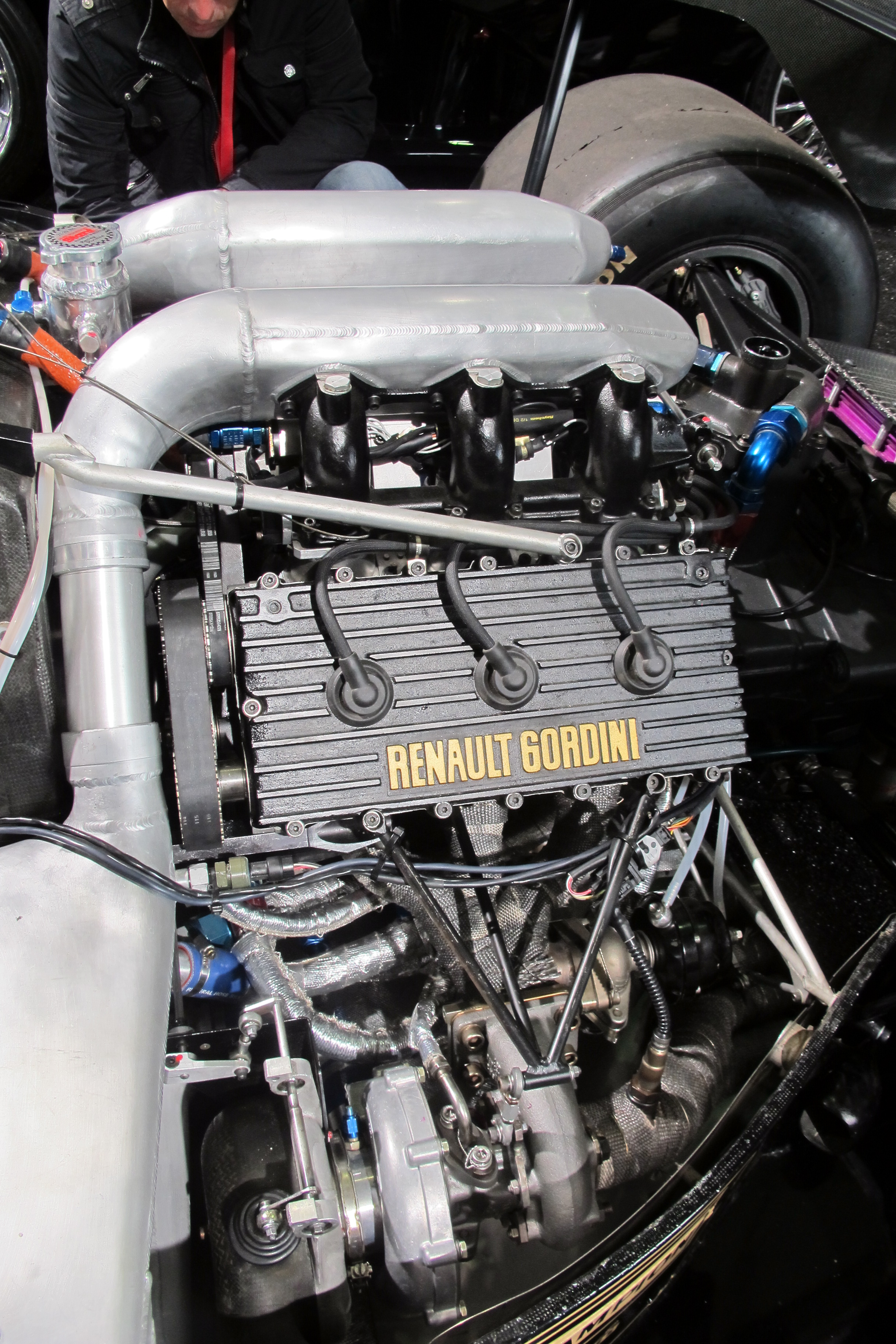
- Renault EF4

Overview
- Manufacturer: (France) Renault Sport
- Designer: Bernard Dudot; François Castaing (base design)
- Production: 1977–1986

Layout
- Configuration: 90° V-6
- Displacement: 1.5 L (1,492 cc); 1.5 L (1,494 cc)
- Cylinder bore: 86 mm (3.39 in); 80.1 mm (3.15 in)
- Piston stroke: 42.8 mm (1.69 in); 49.4 mm (1.94 in)
- Compression ratio: 7.0:1-7.5:1

Combustion
- Turbocharger: Garrett or KKK
- Fuel system: Mechanical fuel injection Electronic fuel injection
- Fuel type: Gasoline
- Cooling system: Water-cooled

Output
- Power output: 510–1,320 PS (375–971 kW; 503–1,302 hp)
- Torque output: 290–660 lb⋅ft (393–895 N⋅m)

Dimensions
- Dry weight: 179 kg (394.6 lb)

Chronology
- Predecessor: CH
- Successor: RS

The EF-Type was a Turbocharged 90° V6 racing engine developed by Renault Sport. The engine was used by Renault, Lotus, Ligier and Tyrrell in Formula One from 1977 to 1986. It was developed by Bernard Dudot from the earlier, 2-litre CH-series V6 engine, designed by François Castaing.

The first iteration, the EF1, used mechanical fuel injection, initially by Kugelfisher. It has an extremely short stroke, at 42.8 mm (1.69 in), giving it a stroke ratio of 2.01. In 1985, the EF4B introduced electronic fuel injection (Bosch Motronic or Renix).

== Formula One World Championship results ==
Year	Entrants	Chassis	Tyres	Drivers	1	2	3	4	5	6	7	8	9	10	11	12	13	14	15	16	17	Points	WCC
1977	Equipe Renault Elf	Renault RS01	M		ARG	BRA	RSA	USW	ESP	MON	BEL	SWE	FRA	GBR	GER	AUT	NED	ITA	USA	CAN	JPN	0	-
1977	Equipe Renault Elf	Renault RS01	M	Jean-Pierre Jabouille										Ret			Ret	Ret	Ret	DNQ		0	-
1978	Equipe Renault Elf	Renault RS01	M		ARG	BRA	RSA	USW	MON	BEL	ESP	SWE	FRA	GBR	GER	AUT	NED	ITA	USA	CAN		3	12th
1978	Equipe Renault Elf	Renault RS01	M	Jean-Pierre Jabouille			Ret	Ret	10	NC	13	Ret	Ret	Ret	Ret	Ret	Ret	Ret	4	12		3	12th
1979	Equipe Renault Elf	Renault RS01; Renault RS10	M		ARG	BRA	RSA	USW	ESP	BEL	MON	FRA	GBR	GER	AUT	NED	ITA	CAN	USA			26	6th
1979	Equipe Renault Elf	Renault RS01; Renault RS10	M	Jean-Pierre Jabouille	Ret	10	Ret	DNS	Ret	Ret	8	1	Ret	Ret	Ret	Ret	14	Ret	Ret			26	6th
1979	Equipe Renault Elf	Renault RS01; Renault RS10	M	René Arnoux	Ret	Ret	Ret	DNS	9	Ret	Ret	3	2	Ret	6	Ret	Ret	Ret	2			26	6th
1980	Equipe Renault Elf	Renault RE20	M		ARG	BRA	RSA	USW	BEL	MON	FRA	GBR	GER	AUT	NED	ITA	CAN	USA				38	4th
1980	Equipe Renault Elf	Renault RE20	M	Jean-Pierre Jabouille	Ret	Ret	Ret	10	Ret	Ret	Ret	Ret	Ret	1	Ret	Ret	Ret					38	4th
1980	Equipe Renault Elf	Renault RE20	M	René Arnoux	Ret	1^{F}	1^{F}	9	4	Ret	5	NC	Ret	9^{P}^{F}	2^{P}^{F}	10^{P}	Ret	7				38	4th
1981	Equipe Renault Elf	RE20B; RE30	M		USW	BRA	ARG	SMR	BEL	MON	ESP	FRA	GBR	GER	AUT	NED	ITA	CAN	CPL			54	3rd
1981	Equipe Renault Elf	RE20B; RE30	M	Alain Prost	Ret	Ret	3	Ret	Ret	Ret	Ret	1^{F}	Ret	2^{P}	Ret	1^{P}	1	Ret	2			54	3rd
1981	Equipe Renault Elf	RE20B; RE30	M	René Arnoux	8	Ret	5	8	DNQ	Ret	9	4^{P}	9^{P}^{F}	13	2^{P}	Ret	Ret^{P}	Ret	Ret			54	3rd
1982	Equipe Renault Elf	RE30B	M		RSA	BRA	USW	SMR	BEL	MON	DET	CAN	NED	GBR	FRA	GER	AUT	SUI	ITA	CPL		62	3rd
1982	Equipe Renault Elf	RE30B	M	Alain Prost	1^{F}	1^{P}^{F}	Ret	Ret	Ret^{P}	7	NC^{P}^{F}	Ret	Ret	6	2	Ret	8	2^{P}^{F}	Ret	4^{P}		62	3rd
1982	Equipe Renault Elf	RE30B	M	René Arnoux	3^{P}	Ret	Ret	Ret^{P}	Ret	Ret^{P}	10	Ret	Ret^{P}	Ret	1^{P}	2	Ret	16	1^{F}	Ret		62	3rd
1983	Equipe Renault Elf	RE30C; RE40	M		BRA	USW	FRA	SMR	MON	BEL	DET	CAN	GBR	GER	AUT	NED	ITA	EUR	RSA			79	2nd
1983	Equipe Renault Elf	RE30C; RE40	M	Alain Prost	7	11	1^{P}^{F}	2	3^{P}	1^{P}	8	5	1^{F}	4	1^{F}	Ret	Ret	2	Ret			79	2nd
1983	Equipe Renault Elf	RE30C; RE40	M	Eddie Cheever	Ret	13	3	Ret	Ret	3	Ret	2	Ret	Ret	4	Ret	3	10	6			79	2nd
1984	Equipe Renault Elf	RE50	M		BRA	RSA	BEL	SMR	FRA	MON	CAN	DET	DAL	GBR	GER	AUT	NED	ITA	EUR	POR		34	5th
1984	Equipe Renault Elf	RE50	M	Patrick Tambay	5	Ret^{F}	7	Ret	2^{P}	Ret	WD	Ret	Ret	8	5	Ret	6	Ret	Ret	7		34	5th
1984	Equipe Renault Elf	RE50	M	Derek Warwick	Ret	3	2	4	Ret	Ret	Ret	Ret^{F}	Ret	2	3	Ret	Ret	Ret	11	Ret		34	5th
1984	Equipe Renault Elf	RE50	M	Philippe Streiff																Ret		34	5th
1985	Equipe Renault Elf	RE60; RE60B	G		BRA	POR	SMR	MON	CAN	DET	FRA	GBR	GER	AUT	NED	ITA	BEL	EUR	RSA	AUS		16	7th
1985	Equipe Renault Elf	RE60; RE60B	G	Patrick Tambay	5	3	3	Ret	7	Ret	6	Ret	Ret	10	Ret	7	Ret	12		Ret		16	7th
1985	Equipe Renault Elf	RE60; RE60B	G	Derek Warwick	10	7	10	5	Ret	Ret	7	5	Ret	Ret	Ret	Ret	6	Ret		Ret		16	7th
1985	Equipe Renault Elf	RE60; RE60B	G	François Hesnault									Ret									16	7th
