= Renault RE40 =

Formula One racing car

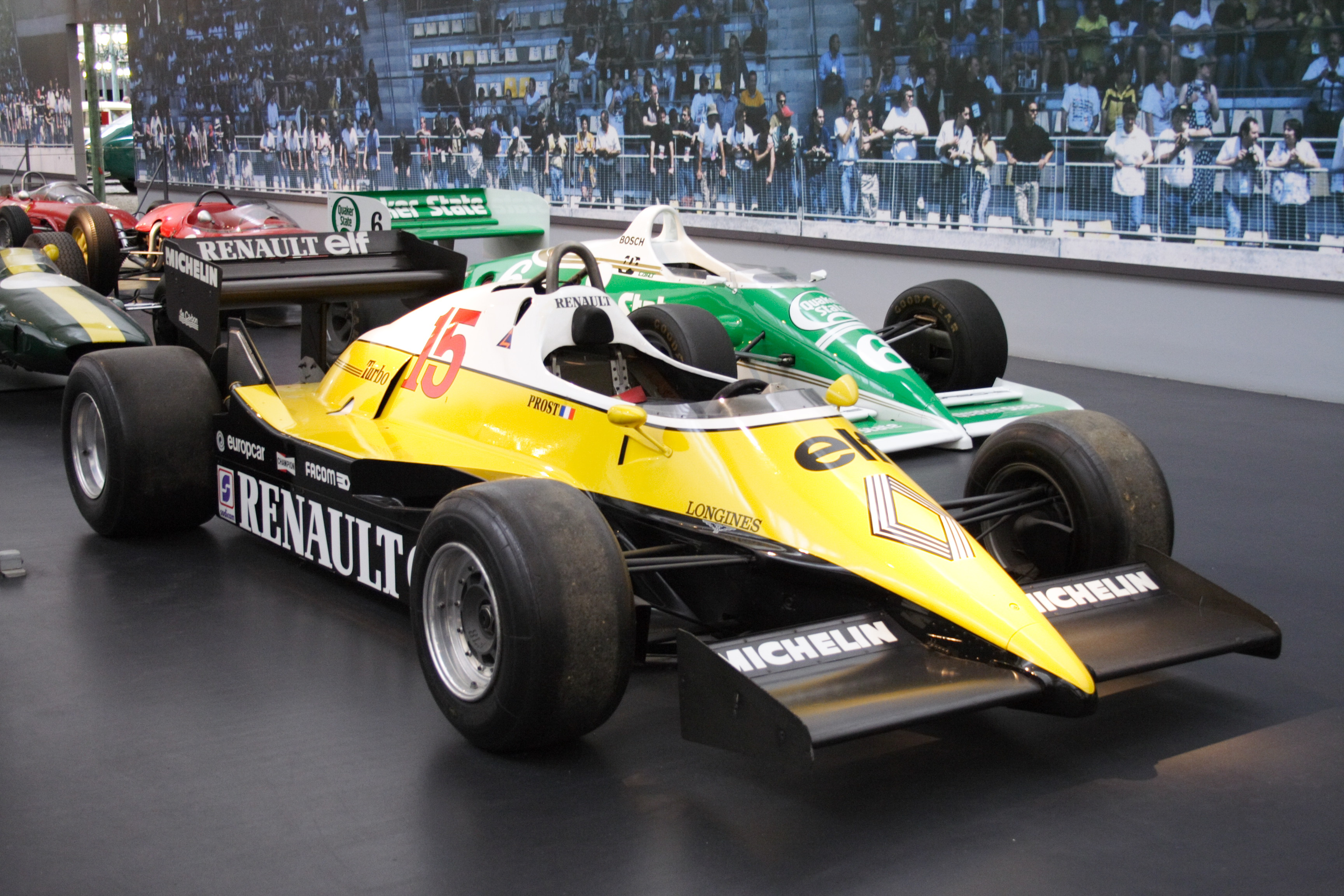
- The RE40 of Alain Prost
- Category: Formula One
- Constructor: Renault
- Designers: Bernard Dudot (Technical Director); Michel Têtu (Chief Designer); Jean-Claude Migeot (Head of Aerodynamics)
- Predecessor: RE30C
- Successor: RE50

Technical specifications
- Chassis: Carbon fibre monocoque.
- Suspension (front): Springs, Pullrods, Double wishbones
- Suspension (rear): Springs, Pullrods, Double wishbones
- Axle track: Front: 1,740 mm (69 in); Rear: 1,630 mm (64 in)
- Wheelbase: 2,730 mm (107 in)
- Engine: Renault Gordini EF1, 1,492 cc (91.0 cu in), 90° V6, turbo mid-engine, longitudinally mounted
- Transmission: Hewland 5 speed manual, with Renault casing
- Weight: 545 kg (1,202 lb)
- Fuel: Elf
- Tyres: Michelin

Competition history
- Notable entrants: Equipe Renault Elf
- Notable drivers: 15. (France) Alain Prost; 16. (United States) Eddie Cheever
- Debut: 1983 United States Grand Prix West
- First win: 1983 French Grand Prix
- Last win: 1983 Austrian Grand Prix
- Last event: 1983 South African Grand Prix
Races	Wins	Poles	F/Laps
14	4	3	3
- Constructors' Championships: 0
- Drivers' Championships: 0

The Renault RE40 is a Formula One racing car. It was designed by Michel Têtu — under the direction of Bernard Dudot, and with aerodynamics by Jean-Claude Migeot — as Renault's car for the 1983 Formula One season.

== Design ==
Ground effect had been banned at the end of 1982, and so the car was built around a flat-bottomed arrangement. It featured enlarged wings to try to claw back as much of the lost downforce as possible. It was also the first Formula One car to feature exhaust routing such that it increased the downforce created by the diffuser. René Arnoux had left the team to be replaced by Eddie Cheever, whilst Alain Prost was now undisputed no.1 driver. The RE40 was designed around his driving style, and he racked up many miles of testing to avoid the unreliability of the previous two seasons.

The RE40 was the first Renault chassis to be built entirely of carbon fibre. Construction of the chassis was outsourced to carbon fibre-specialists Hurel-Dubois, who had experience of the material through their aerospace background. The only part of the chassis not to be constructed in the new material was a small, aluminium nose section, known as the "crash box", that facilitated easy repair in the case of a minor accident. As Formula One use of carbon fibre was only a recent development, and following Didier Pironi's career-ending accident the previous year, the chassis was overbuilt to ensure strength.

Within the novel chassis sat Renault's, by now venerable, Renault Gordini EF1 turbocharged 1.5-litre V6 engine. The unit had first been introduced with the Renault RS01 in 1977, and was the first turbocharged engine ever to win a Formula One Grand Prix. Over the years the engine had been uprated and subtly redesigned, and the twin-turbo (one per cylinder bank) evolution within the RE40 produced a claimed 750 bhp (559 kW) in qualifying trim and around 650 bhp (485 kW) for races. However, the turbochargers themselves were to prove the RE40's weakness in 1983, and on numerous occasions turbo troubles ended Prost or Cheever's race. Alain Prost later recalled that "that year there was a good turbo to have and a bad one. We had the bad one".

== Competition history ==
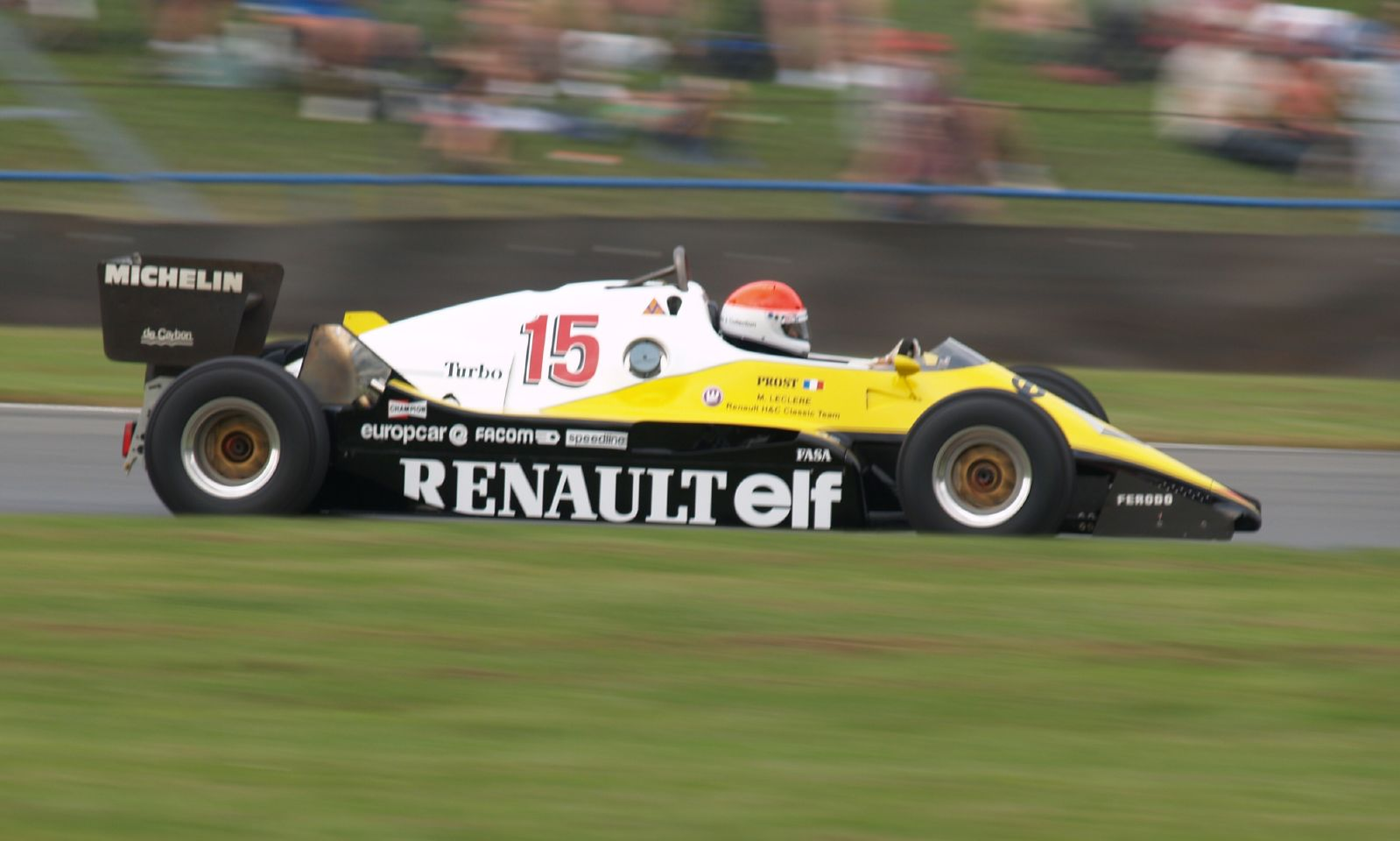
An ex-Alain Prost Renault RE40 being demonstrated by Michel Leclère at Donington Park in 2007.

The RE40 made its Grand Prix debut in the hands of team leader Alain Prost in Round 2 of the season at the US Grand Prix West in Long Beach after he and the team had given the car a shake down run at the Willow Springs Raceway north of Los Angeles in the week before the race. The car made an inauspicious debut in the United States as Prost could only qualify the chronically misfiring car 8th almost 2½ seconds off pole. While there would be better to come in 1983, his weekend at Long Beach was forgettable with the misfire persisting in the race and he finished 3 laps down in 11th place. A second RE40 then appeared for Eddie Cheever on Renault's home soil at the next round at Paul Ricard in France where the American driver started second and finished 3rd behind pole and race winner Prost.

Prost scored consistently and took four wins during the season. He led the drivers' championship for most of the season, ahead of Arnoux who was now at Ferrari alongside another championship contender Patrick Tambay (who would join Renault in 1984), and 1981 World Champion Nelson Piquet in the Brabham-BMW, but at the final round in South Africa the turbo in Prost's car failed and Piquet won the title by two points.

The RE40 was best suited to the faster tracks such as Spa, Silverstone, the Österreichring and Monza (of the four, Prost would only fail to win Monza where he recorded a DNF) despite that it was believed by many (including BBC TV commentators Murray Walker and 1976 World Champion James Hunt) that the Ferrari and BMW turbos had the edge in power over the Renault, and the actual quoted power figures backed this up with the 750 PS (552 kW) Renault V6 giving away approximately 50–100 PS (37–74 kW) in qualifying trim to the Ferrari (800 PS [588 kW]) and BMW (850 PS [625 kW]) in 1983. But, even though re-fuelling was allowed in 1983 meaning that tyres didn't have to last the whole race and the cars could be driven harder, the need for reliability saw all three engine makes de-tuned to approximately 650 PS (478 kW) for races. Prost made the best of his car and team and won more races than any other driver during the year. Cheever, who accepted being the number 2 driver behind Prost, proved to be a good team mate; unlike with Arnoux, Prost and Cheever got on well and the atmosphere within the team was generally good. Cheever scored several podiums and was in line for victory on more than one occasion, but failed to achieve any in the season due to the car's poor reliability.

Prost was tired of Renault's inability to put together a consistent challenge for either championship and was sacked at season's end after publicly criticising the team for their lack of development on the RE40. He would join McLaren at the end of the year. The RE40 took four wins and three poles during the season. However, Prost enjoyed driving the RE40 and later commented that it was "a lovely car ... we should have been World Champions 10 times over." Cheever was also gone at the end of a frustrating season and would join Alfa Romeo.

Alain Prost's win at the Austrian Grand Prix would prove to be the French team's last win in their original run in Formula One, with the team failing to win a Grand Prix in either 1984 or 1985 before Renault pulled out of Grand Prix racing as a constructor at the end of 1985.

The RE40 was replaced by the first round of 1984 by the RE50.

=== Complete Formula One World Championship results ===
(key) (note: results shown in bold indicate pole position; results in italics indicate fastest lap)

Year	Entrant	Engine	Tyres	Driver	1	2	3	4	5	6	7	8	9	10	11	12	13	14	15	Pts.	WCC
1983	Equipe Renault Elf	Renault Gordini EF1; V6 tc	**MI**		BRA	USW	FRA	SMR	MON	BEL	DET	CAN	GBR	GER	AUT	NED	ITA	EUR	RSA	**79**	**2nd**
1983	Equipe Renault Elf	Renault Gordini EF1; V6 tc	**MI**	Alain Prost		11	**1**	2	**3**	**1**	8	5	1	4	1	Ret	Ret	2	Ret	**79**	**2nd**
1983	Equipe Renault Elf	Renault Gordini EF1; V6 tc	**MI**	Eddie Cheever			3	Ret	Ret	3	Ret	2	Ret	Ret	4	Ret	3	10	6	**79**	**2nd**
