= Hawthorn Memorial Trophy =

Trophy awarded to top Commonwealth driver in a Formula One season

- Sport: Motorsport
- Competition: Formula One
- Awarded for: The most successful British or Commonwealth driver in Formula One in a particular year.

History
- First winner: Jack Brabham (1959)
- Most wins: Lewis Hamilton (12)
- Most recent: Lando Norris (2025)

The Hawthorn Memorial Trophy is an annual award honouring the achievements of a British or Commonwealth driver in Formula One motor racing. The Royal Automobile Club (RAC) launched it on 1 May 1959 as a memorial for Mike Hawthorn, a racing driver who retired immediately after becoming the first British Formula One World Drivers' Champion in the 1958 season as a result of the death of his teammate Peter Collins. The gilt and silver trophy, created by K. Lessons of the Goldsmiths Company in 1960, is mounted on a wooden pedestal and features chequered flags and the Union Flag. It is presented to the most successful British or Commonwealth driver of the previous year's Formula One World Championship. The trophy was initially presented at an annual ceremony held at the RAC's headquarters and club in London, but Motorsport UK currently awards it at the following year's British Grand Prix at Silverstone Circuit. The award is considered prestigious in the motor racing world.

The inaugural winner was the Australian driver Jack Brabham who won the 1959 championship. He went on to win the 1960 title, and thus, became the first competitor to retain the accolade. The first British winner was Stirling Moss for the 1961 season, and the inaugural recipient from New Zealand was Denny Hulme after winning the 1967 championship. The only Canadian recipient was Jacques Villeneuve following his winning the championship in the 1997 season. The least successful winner over the course of a season was Jenson Button, who finished in ninth position in the 2005 standings. British racers have won the trophy fifty-five times, followed by Australians with eight victories, New Zealanders with three wins and one Canadian winner. Of the nineteen recipients, all but seven have gone on to win the World Championship, with a total of 25 wins between them. The winner of the 2025 edition was Lando Norris, who was crowned that season's World Drivers' Champion.

== Winners ==
Winners of the Hawthorn Memorial Trophy
Year	Image	Winner	Nationality	Pos	Ref.
1959	Jack Brabham looking to the left of the camera	Jack Brabham	Australia	1st	
1960	Jack Brabam smiling after winning a race	Jack Brabham	Australia	1st	
1961	A black and white photograph Stirling Moss smiling at the camera	Stirling Moss	British	3rd	
1962	Graham Hill in white racing overalls and looking to the right of the camera	Graham Hill	British	1st	
1963	Jim Clark waving the camera in celebrating winning a race	Jim Clark	British	1st	
1964	John Surtees signing an autograph in a racing car	John Surtees	British	1st	
1965	Jim Clark in a black suit with a shirt and tie	Jim Clark	British	1st	
1966	Jack Brabham wearing a racing suit and smiling upwards	Jack Brabham	Australia	1st	
1967	Denny Hulme in a racing suit looking to the left of the camera	Denny Hulme	New Zealand	1st	
1968	Graham Hill in a racing suit looking to the right of the camera	Graham Hill	British	1st	
1969	Jackie Stewart wearing a laurel reef around his neck in celebrating a race victory	Jackie Stewart	British	1st	
1970	Portrait of Denny Hulme looking at the camera	Denny Hulme	New Zealand	4th	
1971	Jackie Stewart in a racing suit looking upwards	Jackie Stewart	British	1st	
1972	Jackie Stewart looking to the left of the camera while another man to his right is talking to him	Jackie Stewart	British	2nd	
1973	Jackie Stewart wearing a yellow T-shirt, a black cap and sunglasses	Jackie Stewart	British	1st	
1974	A portrait of Denny Hulme looking at the camera	Denny Hulme	New Zealand	7th	
1975	A portrait of James Hunt in racing uniform	James Hunt	British	4th	
1976	James Hunt celebrating a victory with a trophy in his right hand	James Hunt	British	1st	
1977	James Hunt in casual outfit in 1977	James Hunt	British	5th	
1978	John Watson looking at the camera	John Watson	British	6th	
1979	Alan Jones looking at the camera and smiling	Alan Jones	Australia	3rd	
1980	Alan Jones in a racing outfit smiling at another man	Alan Jones	Australia	1st	
1981	Alan Jones smiling at the camera	Alan Jones	Australia	3rd	
1982	John Watson in racing uniform holding a glass of water in his right hand	John Watson	British	3rd	
1983	John Watson smiling at the camera	John Watson	British	6th	
1984	Derek Warwick in white racing outfit with his head to the right of the camera	Derek Warwick	British	7th	
1985	Nigel Mansell with a pair of sunglasses atop his head and sporting a moustache	Nigel Mansell	British	6th	
1986	Nigel Mansell wearing a black baseball cap with the number 5	Nigel Mansell	British	2nd	
1987	Nigel Mansell in a white T-shirt with a red remembrance poppy smiling at the camera	Nigel Mansell	British	2nd	
1988	Derek Warwick in a racing suit sitting in a touring car being spoken to a team member	Derek Warwick	British	8th	
1989	Nigel Mansell wearing a black baseball cap and racing outfits on a podium	Nigel Mansell	British	4th	
1990	Nigel Mansell in racing outfit talking to another man	Nigel Mansell	British	5th	
1991	Nigel Mansell sporting a moustache with his eyes looking to the left	Nigel Mansell	British	2nd	
1992	Nigel Mansell wearing a crash helmet with sponsors logos and sitting inside a blue, yellow and white racing car	Nigel Mansell	British	1st	
1993	Damon Hill wearing a red baseball cap with sponsors logos signing autographs for fans	Damon Hill	British	3rd	
1994	Damon Hill walking to the left of the camera	Damon Hill	British	2nd	
1995	Damon Hill in racing uniform walking to the right	Damon Hill	British	2nd	
1996	Damon Hill sporting a goatee in white racing overalls smiling to the left of the camera	Damon Hill	British	1st	
1997	Jacques Villeneuve wearing spectacles and a white baseball cap	Jacques Villeneuve	Canadian	1st	
1998	Black and white studio portrait photograph of David Coulthard in racing uniform	David Coulthard	British	3rd	
1999	Two men in racing outfits stand side by side on a podium in France	Eddie Irvine	British	2nd	
2000	David Coulthard signing autographs for fans	David Coulthard	British	3rd	
2001	David Coulthard holding a microphone in his left hand speaking to the British media	David Coulthard	British	2nd	
2002	David Coulthard wearing a checkered T-shirt preparing for a media broadcast	David Coulthard	British	5th	
2003	David Coulthard wearing a black and white checkered football kit	David Coulthard	British	7th	
2004	Jenson Button wearing a white T-shirt with sponsors logos and black sunglasses	Jenson Button	British	3rd	
2005	Jenson Button wearing a white T-shirt and holding a pen in both of his hands	Jenson Button	British	9th	
2006	Jenson Button wearing black sunglasses and white and black racing overalls with sponsors logos	Jenson Button	British	6th	
2007	Lewis Hamilton wearing a silver clothing and smiling at the camera	Lewis Hamilton	British	2nd	
2008	Lewis Hamilton wearing silver T-shirt and speaking into a microphone	Lewis Hamilton	British	1st	
2009	Jenson Button wearing a white T-shirt and black clothing	Jenson Button	British	1st	
2010	Mark Webber waving to the crowd with his left hand	Mark Webber	Australia	3rd	
2011	Jenson Button wearing a red baseball cap and white racing overalls with sponsors logos	Jenson Button	British	2nd	
2012	Lewis Hamilton speaking to the media in a press conference	Lewis Hamilton	British	4th	
2013	Mark Webber poses for a photo with a fan in the paddock	Mark Webber	Australia	3rd	
2014	Lewis Hamilton speaking to the media at a car event	Lewis Hamilton	British	1st	
2015	Lewis Hamilton in silver racing overalls standing on the third spot on the podium	Lewis Hamilton	British	1st	
2016	Lewis Hamilton wearing a black baseball cap and black T-shirt	Lewis Hamilton	British	2nd	
2017	Lewis Hamilton wearing a silver baseball cap and T-shirt with black sunglasses and a necklace around his neck	Lewis Hamilton	British	1st	
2018	Lewis Hamilton wearing a silver baseball cap and racing outfit and waving to the crowd with his right hand	Lewis Hamilton	British	1st	
2019	Lewis Hamilton wearing a black baseball cap and silver racing suit looking to the crowd	Lewis Hamilton	British	1st	
2020	Lewis Hamilton wearing a black baseball cap and white T-shirt and is waving to the crowd	Lewis Hamilton	British	1st	
2021	Hamilton is wearing a black zip-top, sitting in a chair, looking and smiling at the camera	Lewis Hamilton	British	2nd	
2022	George Russell wearing a silver baseball cap on his head, a black coat with sponsors logos and he is holding a microphone in his right hand	George Russell	British	4th	
2023	Lewis Hamilton wearing black racing overalls	Lewis Hamilton	British	3rd	
2024	Lando Norris wearing orange racing overalls	Lando Norris	British	2nd	
2025	Lando Norris wearing orange racing overalls	Lando Norris	British	1st	

== Statistics ==
Multiple winners
Name	Wins
Lewis Hamilton	12
Nigel Mansell	7
Jenson Button	5
David Coulthard	5
Damon Hill	4
Jackie Stewart	4
Jack Brabham	3
Alan Jones	3
Denny Hulme	3
James Hunt	3
John Watson	3
Jim Clark	2
Graham Hill	2
Derek Warwick	2
Mark Webber	2
Lando Norris	2

Winners by nationality
Nationality	Winners
British	55
Australian	8
New Zealand	3
Canadian	1

== See also ==
- Lorenzo Bandini Trophy
- Motorsport in the United Kingdom
