= Renault RE50 =

Formula One racing car

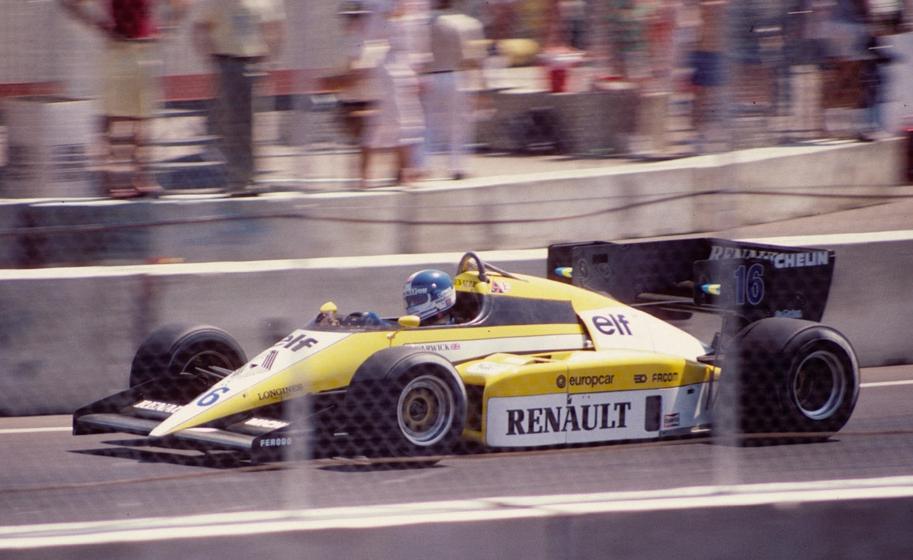
- Derek Warwick driving the RE50 at the 1984 Dallas Grand Prix
- Category: Formula One
- Constructor: Renault
- Designers: Bernard Dudot (Technical Director, Engine Designer); Michel Têtu (Chief Designer (chassis)); Jean-Claude Migeot (Head of Aerodynamics)
- Predecessor: RE40
- Successor: RE60

Technical specifications
- Chassis: Carbon fibre monocoque
- Suspension (front): Forks / spring / delta
- Suspension (rear): Forks / spring / delta
- Axle track: Front: 1,802 mm (70.9 in); Rear: 1,670 mm (66 in)
- Wheelbase: 2,680 mm (105.5 in)
- Engine: Renault Gordini EF4, 1,492 cc (91.0 cu in), 90° V6, turbo, mid-engine, longitudinally mounted
- Transmission: Hewland, with Renault casing 5-speed manual
- Weight: 540 kg (1,190.5 lb)
- Fuel: Elf
- Tyres: Michelin

Competition history
- Notable entrants: Equipe Renault Elf
- Notable drivers: 15. (France) Patrick Tambay; 16. (United Kingdom) Derek Warwick; 33. (France) Philippe Streiff
- Debut: 1984 Brazilian Grand Prix
- Last event: 1984 Portuguese Grand Prix
Races	Wins	Podiums	Poles	F/Laps
16	0	5	1	2
- Constructors' Championships: 0
- Drivers' Championships: 0

The Renault RE50 was the Formula One racing car with which the factory Renault team competed in the 1984 Formula One World Championship. The car was driven by Frenchman Patrick Tambay and Briton Derek Warwick, who joined the team from Ferrari and Toleman respectively; a third car was entered at the final race of the year in Portugal for test driver Philippe Streiff. The car's best results were three second-place and two third-place finishes, making it the first factory Renault not to win a Grand Prix in a season since the RS01 in 1978.

The car was expected to be as competitive in the hands of two-time Grands Prix winner Tambay and the highly rated Warwick as the RE40 had been when driven by Alain Prost to four wins in 1983. While the car was quick from the start, it had a few problems that the team and drivers could not overcome. The Renault EF4 turbo engine was said to be powerful, at 800 bhp (597 kW; 811 PS), but usually fuel consumption was too high for either driver to challenge for more than 2nd or 3rd place at most races. This problem affected other Renault-engined cars such as the Lotus 95T, designed by former Renault designer Gérard Ducarouge, who had joined Lotus in 1984. In 1984 Formula One cars were restricted to a maximum of 220 litres of fuel per race, with the re-fueling of 1983 now banned; the French team never got on top of that problem despite a new and exciting electronic fuel monitoring device. The other main problem was that the car's tub was somewhat fragile, although made of carbon fibre stronger than the traditional aluminium. This fragility saw Warwick injuring his legs in crashes at both Dijon and Monaco, while Tambay suffered a broken left leg after crashing into Warwick's already crashed car at the first corner of the race in Monaco. Both drivers were injured as a result of their cars suspension arms punching through the carbon fibre monocoque.

Over the season, Warwick achieved five points finishes (two second places, two thirds and a fourth) and Tambay four (one second place, two fifths and a sixth). Warwick finished seventh in the Drivers' Championship with 23 points while Tambay finished eleventh with 11; the combined 34 points placed Renault fifth in the Constructors' Championship. Additionally, both drivers set one fastest race lap each, while Tambay took the team's only pole position of the season at their home race in France, leading over half the race before finishing second behind the McLaren-TAG of eventual World Champion Niki Lauda.

The RE50 was replaced for 1985 by the RE60.

== Complete Formula One results ==
(key) (results in bold indicate pole position; results in italics indicate fastest lap)

Year	Entrant	Engine	Tyres	Driver	1	2	3	4	5	6	7	8	9	10	11	12	13	14	15	16	Pts.	WCC
1984	Equipe Renault Elf	Renault Gordini EF4; V6 tc	**MI**		BRA	RSA	BEL	SMR	FRA	MON	CAN	DET	DAL	GBR	GER	AUT	NED	ITA	EUR	POR	**34**	**5th**
1984	Equipe Renault Elf	Renault Gordini EF4; V6 tc	**MI**	Patrick Tambay	5	Ret	7	Ret	**2**	Ret	WD	Ret	Ret	8	5	Ret	6	Ret	Ret	7	**34**	**5th**
1984	Equipe Renault Elf	Renault Gordini EF4; V6 tc	**MI**	Derek Warwick	Ret	3	2	4	Ret	Ret	Ret	Ret	Ret	2	3	Ret	Ret	Ret	11	Ret	**34**	**5th**
1984	Equipe Renault Elf	Renault Gordini EF4; V6 tc	**MI**	Philippe Streiff																Ret	**34**	**5th**
