= Renault RE60 =

Formula One racing car

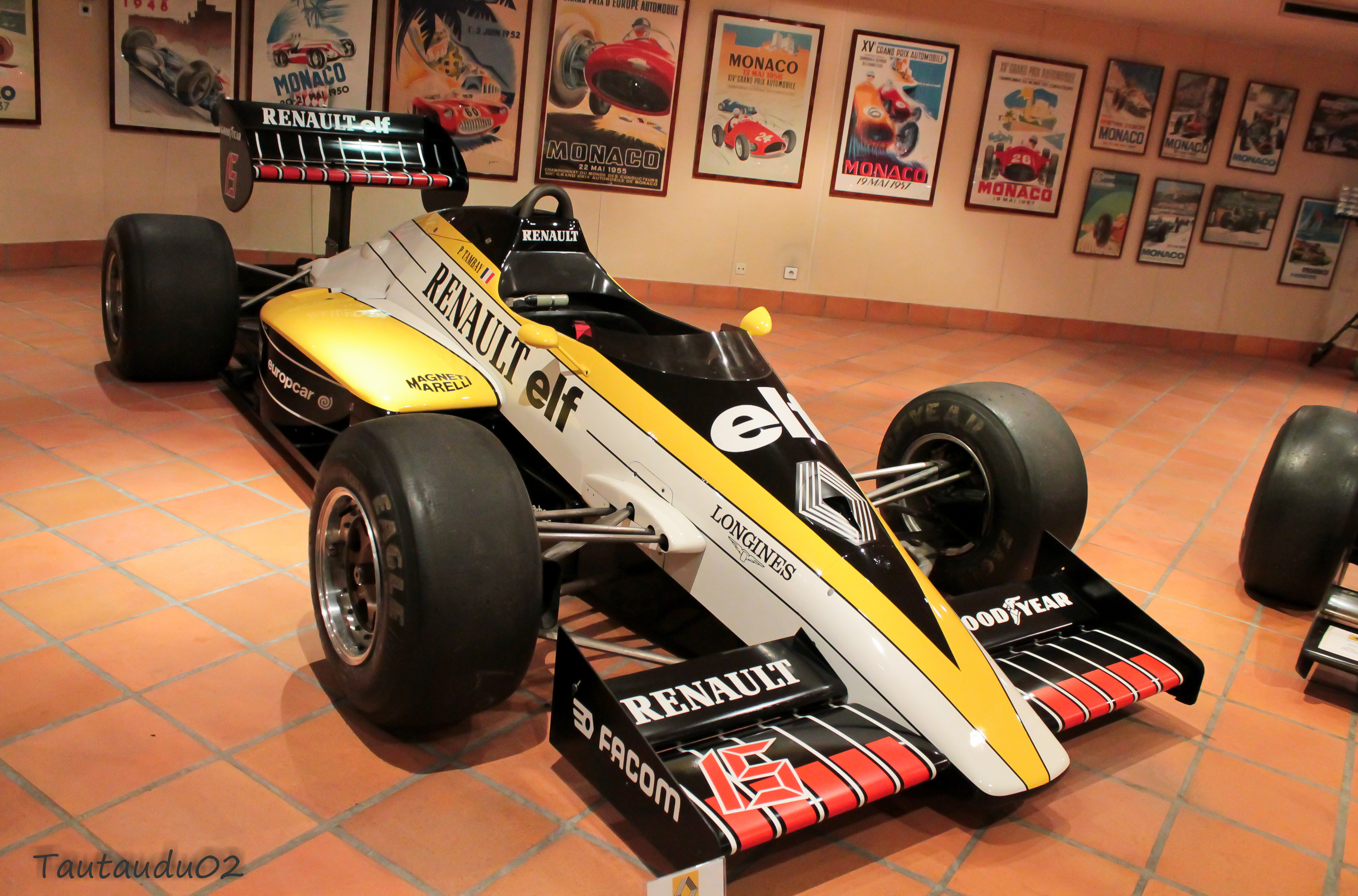
- The RE60 of Patrick Tambay
- Category: Formula One
- Constructor: Renault
- Designers: Bernard Dudot (Technical Director); Jean-Marc d'Adda (Chief Designer); Jean-Claude Migeot (Head of Aerodynamics)
- Predecessor: Renault RE50
- Successor: Renault R202

Technical specifications
- Chassis: Carbon fibre monocoque
- Suspension (front): Forks / springs
- Suspension (rear): Forks / springs
- Axle track: Front: 1,800 mm (71 in); Rear: 1,650 mm (65 in)
- Wheelbase: 2,800 mm (110 in)
- Engine: Renault Gordini EF4B / EF15, 1,494 cc (91.2 cu in), 90° V6, turbocharger, mid-engine, longitudinally mounted
- Transmission: Hewland with Renault casing, 5-speed manual
- Weight: 540 kg (1,190 lb)
- Fuel: Elf
- Tyres: Goodyear

Competition history
- Notable entrants: Equipe Renault Elf
- Notable drivers: 15. (France) Patrick Tambay; 16. (United Kingdom) Derek Warwick; 14. (France) François Hesnault
- Debut: 1985 Brazilian Grand Prix
- Last event: 1985 Australian Grand Prix
Races	Wins	Podiums	Poles	F/Laps
15	0	2	0	0
- Constructors' Championships: 0
- Drivers' Championships: 0

The Renault RE60 was a Formula One car designed by Bernard Dudot and Jean-Claude Migeot and was raced by the Renault team in the 1985 season. The cars were driven by Patrick Tambay and Derek Warwick who had also driven for the team in 1984.

This was the only Renault Formula One car run on Goodyear tyres and also the last Renault Formula One car until their return in 2002.

== Design and development ==
The car was an evolution of 1984’s RE50 raced by the team that pioneered turbocharged engines in Formula One in 1977. While the team and the Renault turbo engine had ultimately been successful in winning races they had never won either the constructors' nor drivers' championships.

Top Renault engineer Michel Têtu and four other key personnel had left the team and the entire team's employment structure had been reshuffled; this proved to be a total disaster for the Renault team. Upon getting to the Jacarepaguá circuit in Rio de Janeiro for pre-season testing, testing by Warwick proved problematic. The car proved to be 3 1/2 seconds slower than the previous year's RE50, and it was later described by Warwick as being "impossible to drive". A modified version of the car, RE60B, was introduced at the French Grand Prix but this failed to generate any better results.

== Driver contracts ==
Niki Lauda had signed an initial letter of intent to leave his 1984 championship-winning McLaren team and join Renault for 1985. The agreement was not implemented and Lauda stayed with McLaren for the 1985 season.

Derek Warwick’s initial contract with Renault was only for the 1984 season. During the year he was approached by the Williams team, who used turbocharged Honda engines, about driving for them in 1985 as a replacement for Jacques Laffite who was moving back to Ligier. As the results for the Honda engine had been relatively poor other than Keke Rosberg's win in the 1984 Dallas Grand Prix, Warwick felt his chances of winning were greater with Renault and he re-signed for the 1985 season, while the Williams drive eventually went to Nigel Mansell.

== Racing history ==
The best results were two third places for Tambay, in Portugal and San Marino, the second and third races of the season. It proved less successful than its predecessor with Tambay scoring the last two podium finishes for the team.

Of the four teams who used the turbocharged Renault V6 engine during the season, the factory-backed Renault team were outperformed by both Lotus and fellow French team Ligier. Lotus finished fourth in the Constructors' Championship, scoring 71 points and three wins, two for Ayrton Senna and one for Elio de Angelis. Ligier finished sixth in the title with seven more points than Renault who finished seventh with just 16 points scored. Tyrrell, who only started using the Renault engines from mid-season, scored 3 points.

== Aftermath ==
Renault having been outscored in 1984 and 1985 by Lotus using the same Renault engine, Renault decided to withdraw from F1 as a works team and continue supplying engines for 1986 to Lotus who were consistently more competitive having won races and several pole positions with Ayrton Senna throughout the 1985 season.

The 1985 season proved to be the last for the factory Renault team although the Renault name would live on in Formula One with both V6 turbo and naturally aspirated V10 engines successfully supplied to various teams until Renault purchased and renamed the Benetton team at the end of 2001. Renault had decided that funding a Formula One team was not worth attempts developing technology for their road cars and the bad PR generated by their continuous failures to be competitive had been the final straw.

Ironically for Warwick, he would later regret his decision to stay in Renault as the 1985 Williams FW10 and its Honda engines won four races in 1985, including giving Mansell his first two career wins, the second of which was the South African Grand Prix that saw the French F1 teams, including the State owned Equipe Renault, boycott the race under the direction of the French Government in protest to South Africa's Apartheid policy. While Mansell would go on to ultimately win 31 races and the 1992 World Championship in his career, Warwick's Formula One career never recovered and he would never win a Grand Prix or drive in a truly competitive car again.

== Complete Formula One World Championship results ==
(key)

Year	Entrant	Engine	Tyres	Driver	1	2	3	4	5	6	7	8	9	10	11	12	13	14	15	16	Pts.	WCC
1985	Equipe Renault Elf	Renault Gordini EF4B / EF15; V6 tc	G		BRA	POR	SMR	MON	CAN	DET	FRA	GBR	GER	AUT	NED	ITA	BEL	EUR	RSA	AUS	16	7th
1985	Equipe Renault Elf	Renault Gordini EF4B / EF15; V6 tc	G	Patrick Tambay	5	3	3	Ret	7	Ret	6	Ret	Ret	10	Ret	7	Ret	12		Ret	16	7th
1985	Equipe Renault Elf	Renault Gordini EF4B / EF15; V6 tc	G	Derek Warwick	10	7	10	5	Ret	Ret	7	5	Ret	Ret	Ret	Ret	6	Ret		Ret	16	7th
1985	Equipe Renault Elf	Renault Gordini EF4B / EF15; V6 tc	G	François Hesnault									Ret								16	7th

- Equipe Renault Elf boycotted the 1985 South African Grand Prix due to mounting international pressures against tolerating the country's system of apartheid. Renault's boycott was in lockstep with the French government's boycott and sanctioning of South Africa
