= 1984 Brazilian Grand Prix =

1st round of the 1984 Formula One Championship

- Race 1 of 16 in the 1984 Formula One World Championship
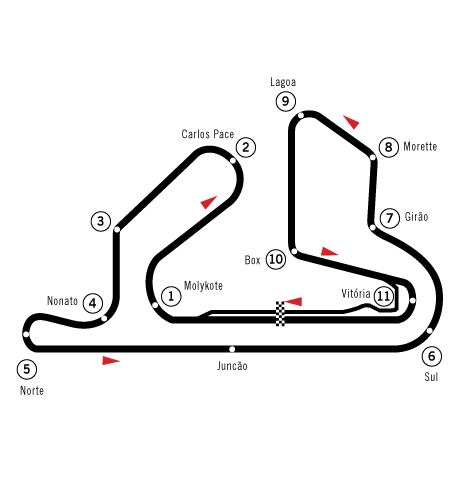

Race details
- Date: 25 March 1984
- Official name: XIII Grande Prêmio Brasil de Fórmula 1
- Location: Jacarepaguá Circuit; Jacarepaguá, Rio de Janeiro
- Course: Permanent racing facility
- Course length: 5.031 km (3.126 miles)
- Distance: 61 laps, 306.891 km (190.693 miles)
- Weather: Dry

Pole position
Driver	(Italy) Elio de Angelis	Lotus-Renault
- Time: 1:28.392

Fastest lap
Driver	(France) Alain Prost	McLaren-TAG
- Time: 1:36.499 on lap 42

Podium
First	(France) Alain Prost	McLaren-TAG
Second	(Finland) Keke Rosberg	Williams-Honda
Third	(Italy) Elio de Angelis	Lotus-Renault

The 1984 Brazilian Grand Prix, officially known as the XIII Grande Prêmio Brasil de Fórmula 1 was a Formula One motor race held on 25 March 1984 in Rio de Janeiro. The race was contested over 61 laps of Jacarepaguá Circuit and was the first race of the 1984 Formula One World Championship. This race was the 13th edition of the Brazilian Grand Prix, the ninth time that the Jacarepaguá Circuit race held a Grand Prix, and marked the debut of Ayrton Senna in Formula One.

In qualifying, Italian driver, Elio de Angelis from Team Lotus claimed pole for the second time in his career as he finished ahead of fellow Italian driver, Michele Alboreto who was in the Ferrari. In the race it was Alain Prost in the McLaren car who would take out his second win in Brazil. He finished ahead of Keke Rosberg who was in the Williams with de Angelis finishing in third.

== Qualifying ==
Elio de Angelis claimed the first pole position of the season in his Lotus-Renault from the Ferrari of Michele Alboreto in his first race for the Prancing Horse. Derek Warwick, in his first race for Renault, was 3rd on the grid with the McLaren-TAG of Alain Prost 4th, Prost returning to the team he started his career with after three seasons with Renault. Reigning World Champion (and local favourite) Nelson Piquet qualified 7th in his Brabham-BMW, while another Brazilian, a Formula One rookie by the name of Ayrton Senna qualified 17th for his first ever Grand Prix in his Toleman-Hart.

== Race ==
With only 220 litres of fuel allowed, many teams on the grid tried various ways to save fuel from evaporating in the Rio heat. McLaren covered their cars in tin foil while others such as Lotus and Renault attempted to freeze their fuel in order to actually fit more in. The Renault team also had a sophisticated (for 1984) electronic fuel monitoring system which they hoped would give them an advantage over their rivals.

Alboreto got the jump at the start and led early from Warwick and de Angelis, with the McLarens of Niki Lauda 4th and Prost fighting back from a bad start. The Frenchman had bogged down at the green light with too few revs and was only 10th at the end of the first lap (Piquet also made a bad start after almost stalling at the green light and much to the agony of the crowd, was only in 23rd halfway through the first lap). Not having done a practice start in the car, during the warm-up Prost had asked Lauda what revs to use at the start. Lauda told him no less than 10,000 but on the grid Prost felt this was too high and dropped to 8,000 only to find Lauda had been correct. Despite this he was beginning to show the superior race speed which would become the story of the season. Lauda quickly passed de Angelis and when he passed Warwick for 2nd at the end of the back straight on lap 10, the McLaren's right rear hit the Renault's left front tyre. The hit damaged Warwick's suspension, leading to suspension failure for the Renault driver late in the race when running second.

Senna was the first retirement of the 1984 season when the Hart 415T in his Toleman blew its turbo on lap 8.

Alboreto's race was ruined by a loose bolt in his car's right front brake caliper which released all the brake fluid and caused the brake to overheat, resulting in a couple of spins and a pit stop where buckets of water were thrown over the brakes in a vain attempt at cooling it. Lauda was leading by some 40 seconds on lap 34 when the wires to his McLaren's battery came loose causing electrical failure, while after almost stalling his Brabham-BMW at the start, Piquet finished an unhappy race on lap 32 when the BMW engine failed coming onto the pit straight.

After passing Warwick for the lead, Prost, who was in the pits for a tyre change when Lauda coasted in to retire, lost the lead back to the Englishman when he made his second stop for tyres. With 10 laps to go it looked like Warwick was headed for his first ever Grand Prix win with a 20+ second lead on the McLaren. But the lap 10 clash with Lauda had come home to roost and the Renault's front left suspension failed, handing the lead to Prost who then easily ran out the winner by 40 seconds from the Williams-Honda of Keke Rosberg and the Lotus-Renault of de Angelis. For Rosberg it was his third successive second place in the Brazilian Grand Prix, though it was the only one in which he was not disqualified. Eddie Cheever finish 4th in the Alfa Romeo giving some hope that the 890T V8 would not be as thirsty for fuel as predicted, while Renault's Patrick Tambay was classified in 6th after running out of fuel on the last lap, losing 5th to another F1 rookie, Martin Brundle in his Tyrrell-Ford.

Brundle, and the Tyrrell team, would later be disqualified from the season for technical infringements. This promoted Tambay to 5th and the Arrows-Ford of Thierry Boutsen to 6th.

== Classification ==
=== Qualifying ===
Pos	No	Driver	Constructor	Q1	Q2	Gap
1	11	(Italy) Elio de Angelis	Lotus-Renault	1:29.625	1:28.392	—
2	27	(Italy) Michele Alboreto	Ferrari	1:29.950	1:28.898	+0.506
3	16	(United Kingdom) Derek Warwick	Renault	1:30.945	1:29.025	+0.633
4	7	(France) Alain Prost	McLaren-TAG	1:29.823	1:29.330	+0.938
5	12	(United Kingdom) Nigel Mansell	Lotus-Renault	1:29.364	1:30.182	+0.972
6	8	(Austria) Niki Lauda	McLaren-TAG	1:29.951	1:29.854	+1.462
7	1	(Brazil) Nelson Piquet	Brabham-BMW	1:31.068	1:30.149	+1.757
8	15	(France) Patrick Tambay	Renault	1:30.719	1:30.554	+2.162
9	6	(Finland) Keke Rosberg	Williams-Honda	1:31.778	1:30.611	+2.219
10	28	(France) René Arnoux	Ferrari	1:30.832	1:30.695	+2.303
11	22	(Italy) Riccardo Patrese	Alfa Romeo	1:30.973	1:31.679	+2.581
12	23	(United States) Eddie Cheever	Alfa Romeo	1:33.115	1:31.282	+2.890
13	5	(France) Jacques Laffite	Williams-Honda	1:32.032	1:31.548	+3.156
14	26	(Italy) Andrea de Cesaris	Ligier-Renault	1:34.622	1:32.895	+4.503
15	14	(West Germany) Manfred Winkelhock	ATS-BMW	1:35.395	1:32.997	+4.253
16	2	(Italy) Teo Fabi	Brabham-BMW	1:33.951	1:33.227	+4.835
17	19	(Brazil) Ayrton Senna	Toleman-Hart	1:36.867	1:33.525	+5.133
18	20	(Venezuela) Johnny Cecotto	Toleman-Hart	1:35.980	1:35.300	+6.908
19	3	(United Kingdom) Martin Brundle	Tyrrell-Ford	1:36.081	1:36.191	+7.689
20	25	(France) François Hesnault	Ligier-Renault	1:36.257	1:36.238	+7.846
21	18	(Belgium) Thierry Boutsen	Arrows-Ford	1:36.737	1:36.312	+7.920
22	24	(Italy) Piercarlo Ghinzani	Osella-Alfa Romeo	1:40.431	1:36.434	+8.042
23	4	(West Germany) Stefan Bellof	Tyrrell-Ford	1:36.957	1:36.609	+8.217
24	21	(Italy) Mauro Baldi	Spirit-Hart	1:36.816	1:39.873	+8.424
25	17	(Switzerland) Marc Surer	Arrows-Ford	1:37.204	1:37.348	+8.812
26	9	(France) Philippe Alliot	RAM-Hart	1:38.124	1:37.709	+9.317
DNQ	10	(United Kingdom) Jonathan Palmer	RAM-Hart	1:39.840	1:37.919	+9.527

=== Race ===
Pos	No	Driver	Constructor	Tyre	Laps	Time/Retired	Grid	Points
1	7	(France) Alain Prost	McLaren-TAG	MI	61	1:42:34.492	4	9
2	6	(Finland) Keke Rosberg	Williams-Honda	G	61	+ 40.514	9	6
3	11	(Italy) Elio de Angelis	Lotus-Renault	G	61	+ 59.128	1	4
4	23	(United States) Eddie Cheever	Alfa Romeo	G	60	+ 1 Lap	12	3
5	15	(France) Patrick Tambay	Renault	MI	59	Out of Fuel	8	2
6	18	(Belgium) Thierry Boutsen	Arrows-Ford	G	59	+ 2 Laps	20	1
7	17	(Switzerland) Marc Surer	Arrows-Ford	G	59	+ 2 Laps	24	
8	10	(United Kingdom) Jonathan Palmer	RAM-Hart	P	58	+ 3 Laps	26	
DSQ	3	(United Kingdom) Martin Brundle	Tyrrell-Ford	G	60	Disqualified	18	
Ret	16	(United Kingdom) Derek Warwick	Renault	MI	51	Suspension	3	
Ret	26	(Italy) Andrea de Cesaris	Ligier-Renault	MI	42	Gearbox	14	
Ret	22	(Italy) Riccardo Patrese	Alfa Romeo	G	41	Gearbox	11	
Ret	8	(Austria) Niki Lauda	McLaren-TAG	MI	38	Electrical	6	
Ret	12	(United Kingdom) Nigel Mansell	Lotus-Renault	G	35	Accident	5	
Ret	1	(Brazil) Nelson Piquet	Brabham-BMW	MI	32	Engine	7	
Ret	2	(Italy) Teo Fabi	Brabham-BMW	MI	32	Turbo	15	
Ret	28	(France) René Arnoux	Ferrari	G	30	Battery	10	
Ret	24	(Italy) Piercarlo Ghinzani	Osella-Alfa Romeo	P	28	Gearbox	21	
Ret	25	(France) François Hesnault	Ligier-Renault	MI	25	Overheating	19	
Ret	9	(France) Philippe Alliot	RAM-Hart	P	24	Battery	25	
Ret	20	(Venezuela) Johnny Cecotto	Toleman-Hart	P	18	Turbo	17	
Ret	5	(France) Jacques Laffite	Williams-Honda	G	15	Electrical	13	
Ret	27	(Italy) Michele Alboreto	Ferrari	G	14	Brakes	2	
Ret	21	(Italy) Mauro Baldi	Spirit-Hart	P	12	Distributor	23	
DSQ	4	(West Germany) Stefan Bellof	Tyrrell-Ford	G	11	Disqualified	22	
Ret	19	(Brazil) Ayrton Senna	Toleman-Hart	P	8	Turbo	16	
EX	14	(West Germany) Manfred Winkelhock	ATS-BMW	P	0	Excluded		

== Championship standings after the race ==
Drivers' Championship standings

Pos	Driver	Points
1	(France) Alain Prost	9
2	(Finland) Keke Rosberg	6
3	(Italy) Elio de Angelis	4
4	(United States) Eddie Cheever	3
5	(United Kingdom) Martin Brundle	2

Constructors' Championship standings

Pos	Constructor	Points
1	(United Kingdom) McLaren-TAG	9
2	(United Kingdom) Williams-Honda	6
3	(United Kingdom) Lotus-Renault	4
4	(Italy) Alfa Romeo	3
5	(United Kingdom) Tyrrell-Ford	2

- Note: Only the top five positions are included for both sets of standings. Points accurate at final declaration of results. Tyrrell and its drivers were subsequently disqualified and their points reallocated.

Previous race: 1983 South African Grand Prix	FIA Formula One World Championship; 1984 season	Next race: 1984 South African Grand Prix
Previous race: 1983 Brazilian Grand Prix	Brazilian Grand Prix	Next race: 1985 Brazilian Grand Prix
