= Derek Warwick =

British racing driver (born 1954)

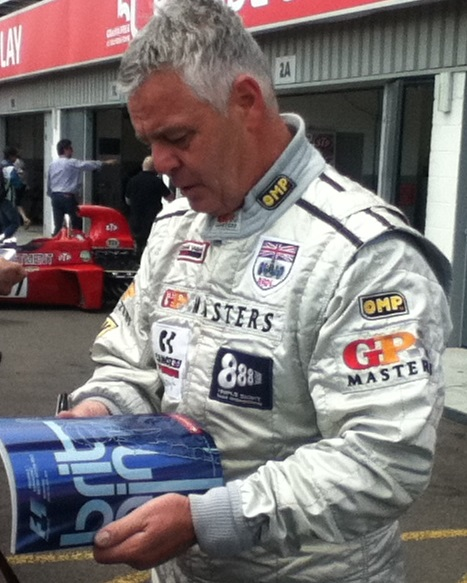
- Warwick at the 2014 British Grand Prix
- Born: Derek Stanley Arthur Warwick; 27 August 1954 (age 72); New Alresford, Hampshire, England
- Relatives: Paul Warwick (brother)

Formula One World Championship career
- Nationality: (United Kingdom) British
- Active years: 1981–1990, 1993
- Team(s): Toleman, Renault, Brabham, Arrows, Lotus, Footwork
- Entries: 162 (147 starts)
- Championships: 0
- Wins: 0
- Podiums: 4
- Career points: 71
- Pole positions: 0
- Fastest laps: 2
- First entry: 1981 San Marino Grand Prix
- Last entry: 1993 Australian Grand Prix

World Sportscar Championship career
- Years active: 1983, 1986, 1991–1992
- Teams: Kremer, Jaguar, Peugeot
- Starts: 25
- Championships: 1 (1992)
- Wins: 7
- Podiums: 14
- Poles: 5
- Fastest laps: 2

24 Hours of Le Mans career
- Years: 1983, 1986, 1991–1992, 1996
- Teams: Kremer, Jaguar, Peugeot, Courage
- Best finish: 1st (1992)
- Class wins: 1 (1992)

Derek Stanley Arthur Warwick (born 27 August 1954) is a British former racing driver, who competed in Formula One between 1981 and 1993. (Note: The exact years Warwick competed in Formula One: 1981–1990, 1993.) In endurance racing, Warwick won the World Sportscar Championship and 24 Hours of Le Mans, both in 1992 with Peugeot.

Born in New Alresford, Warwick was the older brother of Paul Warwick. He signed for Toleman in 1981, debuting at the San Marino Grand Prix; he did not qualify in the TG181 until the season-ending Caesars Palace Grand Prix. In 1984, he achieved four podiums with Renault, and would be awarded the Hawthorn Memorial Trophy, a feat he would later repeat in 1988.

In 2005 and 2006, Warwick raced in the inaugural season of the Grand Prix Masters formula for retired Formula One drivers. He has served as the fourth steward for three Grands Prix in 2010 and 2011. He was president of the British Racing Drivers Club (2011-2017), succeeding Damon Hill and preceding Paddy Hopkirk.

== Early life and career ==
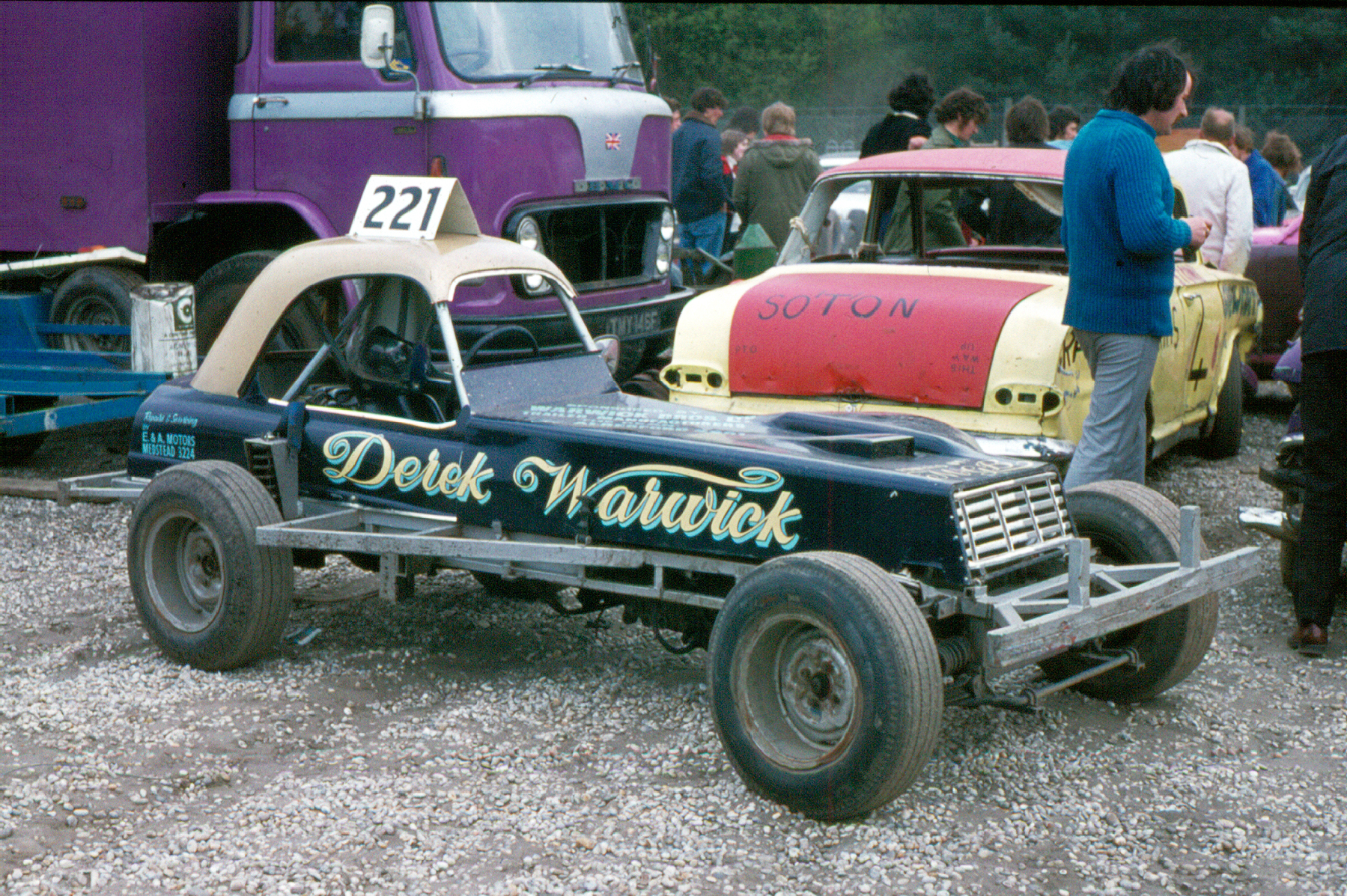
Derek Warwick's Superstox car, Matchams Park, 1973

Warwick was born in Alresford, Hampshire, England. He began his career in British stock car racing under the Spedeworth organisation at tracks such as his local Aldershot Stadium. He won the Superstox English Championship in 1971 (at the age of 16) and the World Championship at Wimbledon Stadium in 1973. His younger brother Paul also raced with some success in Superstox before progressing to Formula 3000, in which he was racing when killed in an accident in 1991.

Warwick finished runner-up in the 1978 British Formula 3 Championship.

== Formula One (1981–1993) ==
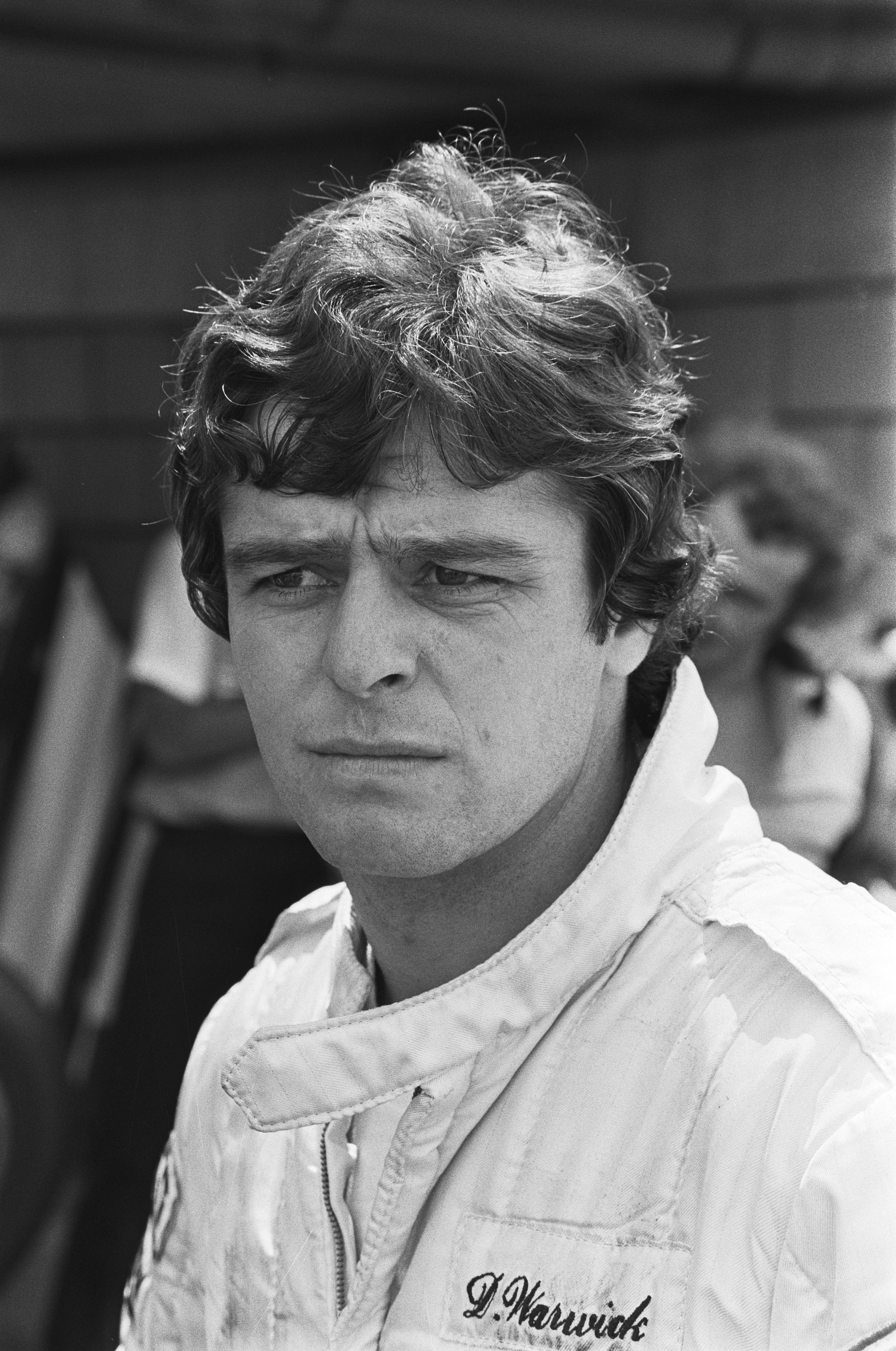
Warwick at the 1982 Dutch Grand Prix

Warwick began his Formula One career with the fledgling F1 team Toleman for the 1981 season. He managed to qualify for only one race that year, the season finale at Las Vegas. Warwick had mainly dismal 1981 and 1982 seasons in the Toleman car, but bounced back, scoring points in the final four rounds of the 1983 championship.

Warwick joined Renault in 1984 after Alain Prost left them at the end of 1983. Warwick, expecting to have a race-winning car, led the Brazilian Grand Prix, his first drive for them, only to retire because of a suspension failure caused by an early race wheel banging duel with the McLaren of Niki Lauda. He finished in second place in both the Belgian and British Grands Prix in 1984 and placed seventh in the championship. 1984 would prove to be the beginning of the end for the factory Renault team, the pioneers of turbocharging in Formula One. Neither Warwick nor new teammate Patrick Tambay won a race in 1984, the first time since 1978 that the team did not win a Grand Prix.

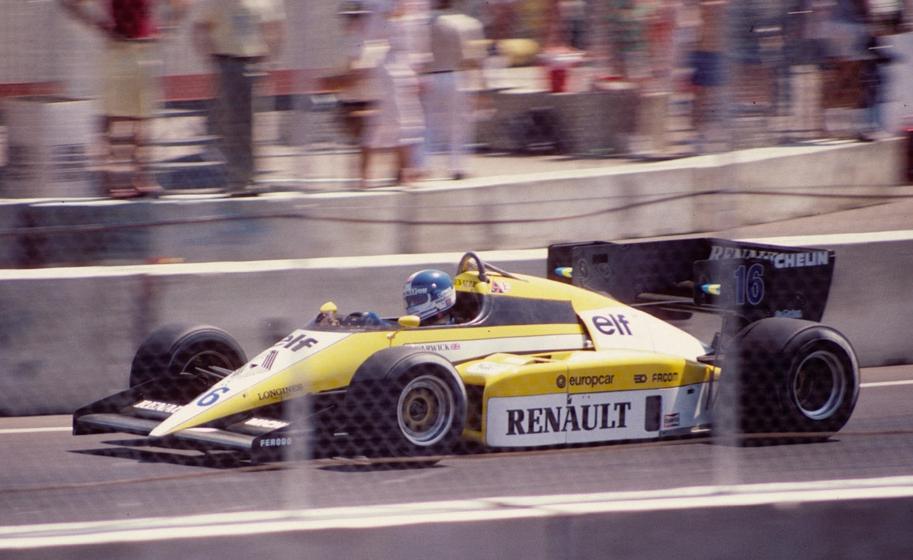
Warwick qualified third for Renault at the 1984 Dallas Grand Prix, but spun off after 10 laps.

The turning point in Warwick's career was his decision to stay at Renault for 1985 and reject an offer to drive for Williams-Honda. The seat was then offered to Nigel Mansell who, accepting the position, went on to win two races at the end of the season. 1985 was a poor one for Renault and the team withdrew from Formula One at the end of the year. Renault's withdrawal, and Ayrton Senna's refusal to let Warwick join him as teammate at Lotus (using his contracted number one driver status in the team, Senna refused to have anyone but a pure #2 as his teammate as he believed Lotus were not capable of supporting two championship contending drivers), left Warwick without a team for the 1986 season and he took up an offer to drive for Tom Walkinshaw's TWR Jaguar team in the World Sportscar Championship. Following the death of Elio de Angelis in a testing accident in May, however, Warwick was invited to take his place at Brabham. Unconfirmed rumours surfaced that Brabham owner Bernie Ecclestone had invited Warwick to take de Angelis's place as the Englishman was the only available top driver who had not actually contacted the team offering his services in the days following the Italian's untimely death. Warwick explained:

"I got a phone call from Bernie, who said that he really appreciated the fact that I didn't call him five minutes after Elio had died and would I like to drive for him."

As no Grands Prix clashed with his Sportscar commitments, Warwick was able to race in both world championships.

In 1987, Warwick moved to the Arrows team alongside his Jaguar teammate Eddie Cheever, ending the season with three points scored. The 1988 season saw an improvement on the Arrows performance due to the powerful Megatron (a re-badged BMW M12) engine and Warwick finished seven times in the top-six, earning him 17 points and a respectable eighth position in the championship. His best race of the season was fourth in the Italian Grand Prix at Monza where he finished only half a second behind Cheever. Italy was also notable in that it was the first time since the beginning of 1987 that Arrows engine guru Heini Mader finally solved the problem with the FIA's mandatory pop-off valve which restricted turbo boost. For the first time this allowed both Warwick and Cheever to fully exploit the power of the 640 bhp (477 kW; 649 PS) Megatron engine (restricted to 2.5 BAR boost in 1988) and be much closer to the front than they had been previously.

In 1989, victory eluded Warwick in two occasions. The first was in the Brazilian Grand Prix, when two disastrous pit-stops cost him more than the 17 seconds he finished behind winner Nigel Mansell. First he was stationary for 18 seconds (around 10 more than usual) due to a stuck rear wheel, then had the same problem at his second stop, compounded by Warwick stalling his engine. The second stop saw him stationary for 25 seconds. Going by time lost, had both stops been trouble free he could have won by around ten seconds. But more heartbreak was to came at the Canadian Grand Prix in Montreal, when Warwick drove superbly and was leading the wet race, only to have his Ford V8 engine fail on lap 40 while in second place. Ayrton Senna, who had passed Warwick for the lead on lap 38, would himself retire when his McLaren's Honda V10 blew three laps from the finish. As Warwick was lapping much quicker than those behind him, including the V10 Williams-Renault of eventual winner Thierry Boutsen, it is possible he could have scored his first Grand Prix win had he finished. Reliability issues plagued Warwick's season and cost him good finishes in other races as well, resulting in only seven points for the season, the last of his three years and first stint with Arrows.

For the 1990 season, four years after Senna's veto, Warwick finally drove for Lotus who in 1990 would be using the 640 bhp (477 kW; 649 PS) Lamborghini V12 engine. But the glory days of that team were over and the Lamborghini LE3512 proved both underpowered and unreliable (the Honda V10s in the McLarens were rated at around 690 bhp (515 kW; 700 PS) and were far more reliable) and Warwick ended the season with a meagre three points tally. Warwick would later describe the Lamborghini as "All noise and no go" while also noting that the Lotus 102 was not a pleasant car to drive as its chassis would "flex", not just under power but also under braking. His greatest achievement of the season happened at the 1990 Spanish Grand Prix where his teammate Martin Donnelly suffered a severe crash leaving Warwick to help morale at the team by qualifying in the top-ten only for the gearbox to fail ten laps from the end. Warwick himself had a somewhat terrifying crash at the Italian GP at Monza when on the last turn on the first lap at the Parabolica, the Lotus drifted wide to the left and off the track, collecting the barrier at speed before flipping over onto its side and roll cover while sliding down front straight with cars speeding past. Thankfully no other cars hit the stricken Lotus and an unhurt Warwick was able to scramble from his upturned car and actually run back to the pits to get into the spare car for the re-start (the race had been red flagged with the Lotus stuck in the middle of the track). To his credit, Warwick readily admitted to nothing more than driver error, just running too wide at the exit of the turn.

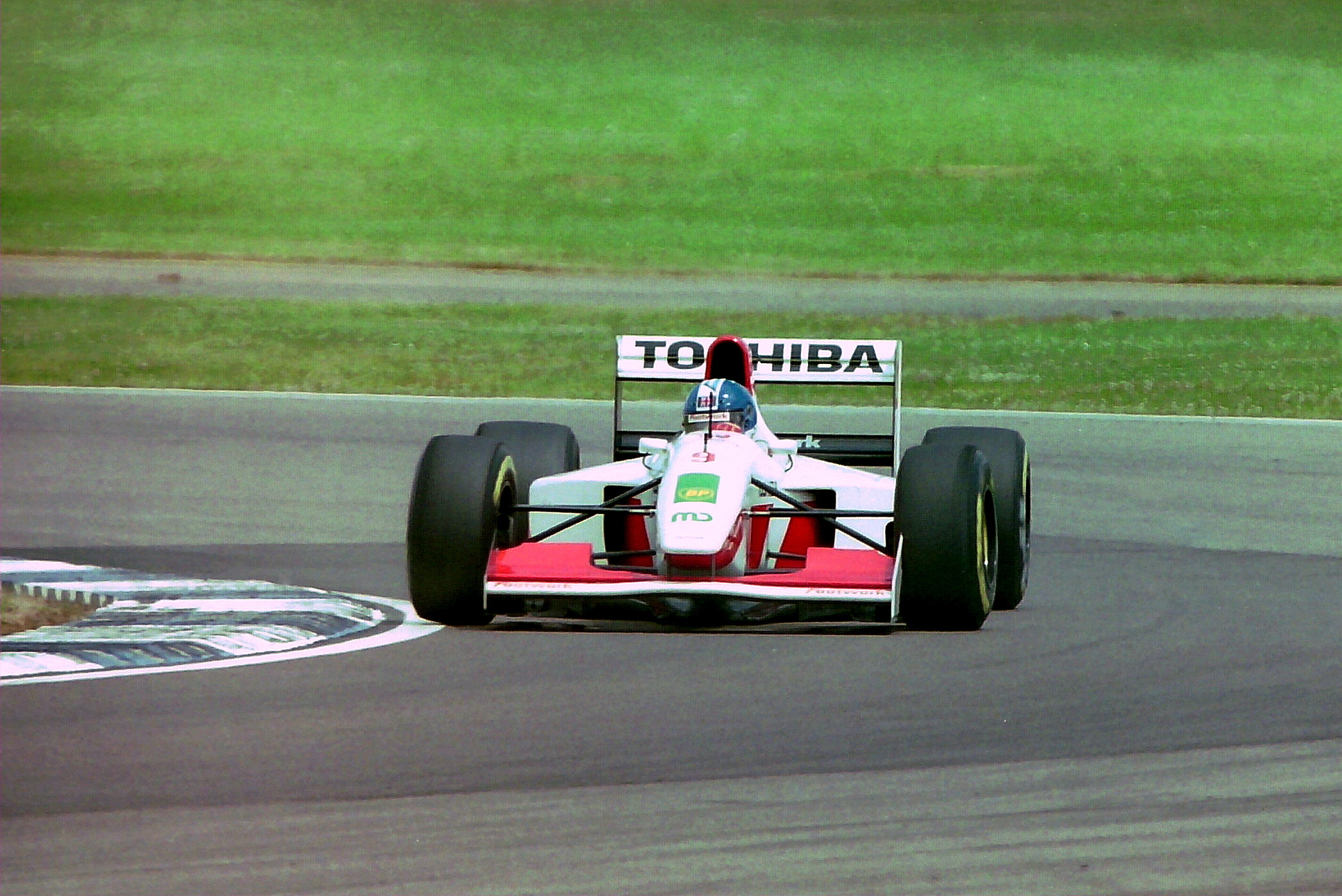
Warwick driving for Footwork at the 1993 British Grand Prix.

In 1992, Warwick tested an IndyCar Lola T92/00 for Hall/VDS Racing for two days at Mid-Ohio in the off-season, to assess a possible move to CART for 1993. Ultimately he did not and instead returned to Formula 1.

Warwick had firm offers of paid drives for 1993 with Jordan and Footwork and ultimately chose the latter. Warwick returned to Formula 1 following a 3-year sabbatical and completed the full season in 1993, but managed to score only four points. He ended his career with a total of 71 Grand Prix points.

BBC Sport described Warwick as "the best British racing driver never to win a Grand Prix" in 2024.

== Sports and touring cars ==
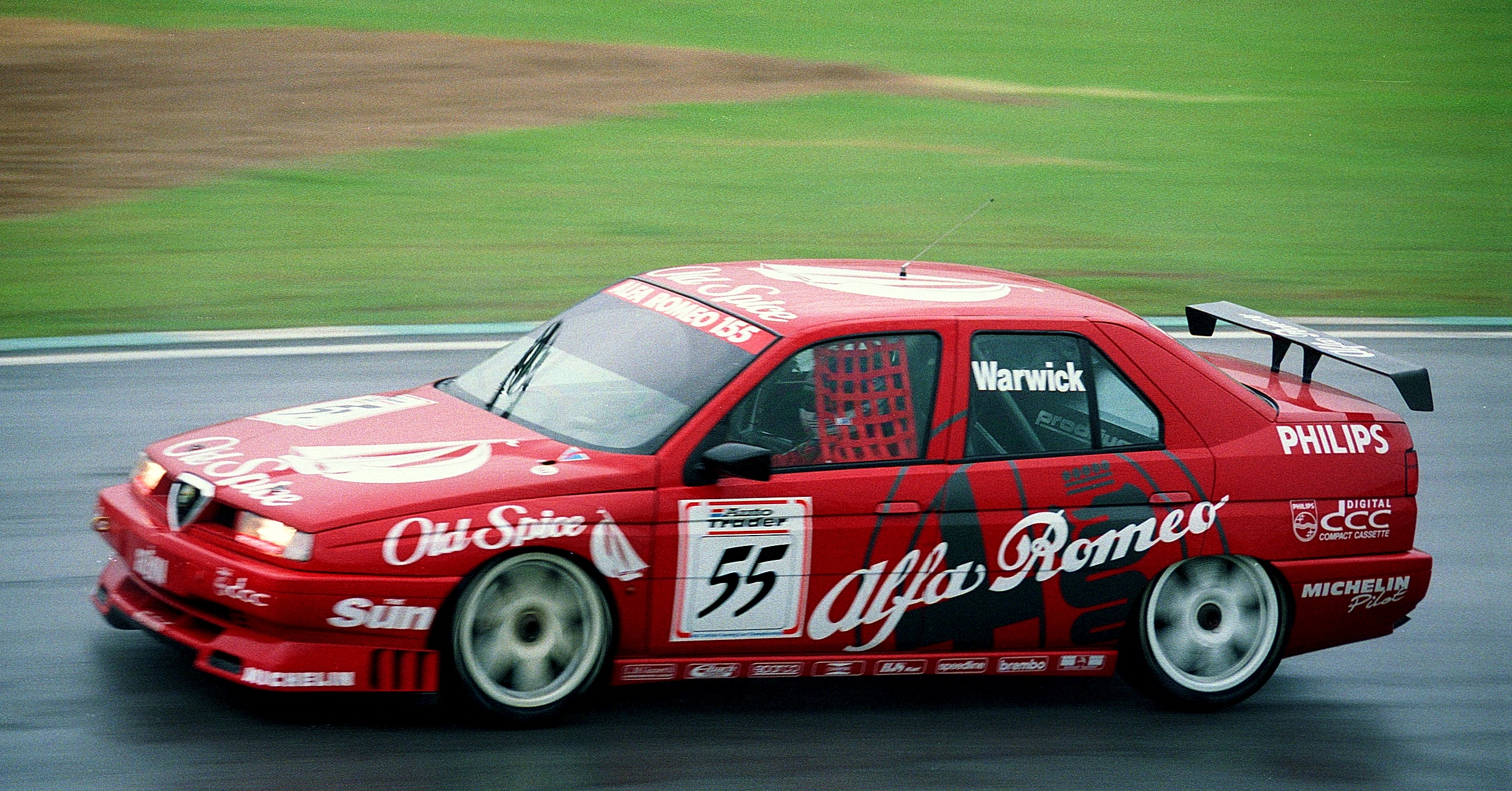
Warwick driving for Alfa Romeo at Brands Hatch during the 1995 British Touring Car Championship season.

Warwick also competed successfully in sports car racing, winning the World Sportscar Championship in 1992, and was part of the Peugeot team which was victorious at the 24 hours of Le Mans race that year. He drove sports cars for Jaguar in 1986 and 1991.

=== Honda CR-X Challenge ===
In 1988, Warwick made an appearance in the Celebrity Car in the inaugural Honda CR-X Challenge.

Warwick entered a two-car team in the 1990 season. His drivers were mainly Robin Brundle (who won at Castle Combe) and Roland Dane (with whom, he would later set up Triple 8 Racing), although he raced himself at Donington Park and finished fifth. He also ran his brother Paul in a few rounds, peaking with third at Snetterton.

=== British Touring Car Championship ===
Warwick raced in the British Touring Car Championship (BTCC) after retiring from Formula One, driving for the Alfa Romeo works team in 1995. Despite the team's domination the previous year, their car was underdeveloped this time, leading to a poor season. In the first race of the season at Donington Park, he crashed and flying debris broke a TV camera lens, an incident featured in the highlights screened by the BBC a week later, with commentator Murray Walker quipping that Warwick owed them £6,000 for the damage ("that'll be six grand please, Derek!").

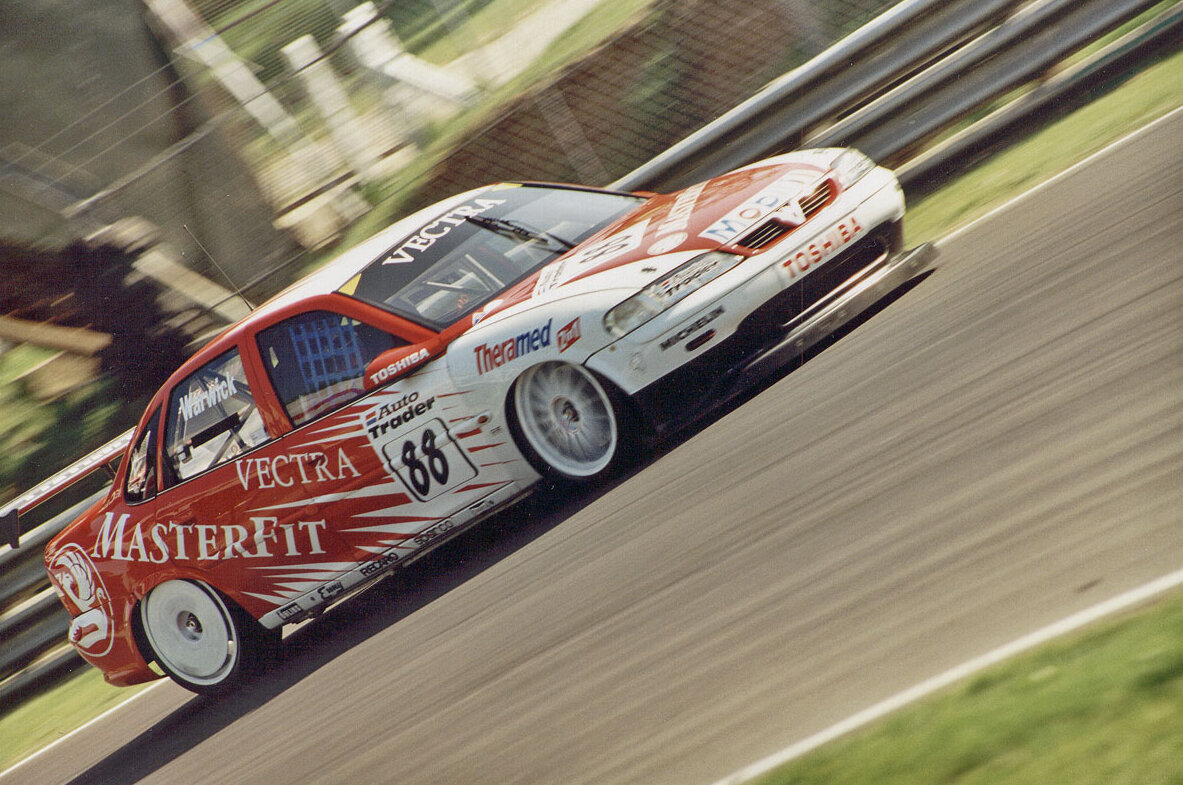
Warwick driving for Vauxhall in the 1998 British Touring Car Championship.

After a year out of racing, Warwick co-founded the Triple Eight Racing team with Roland Dane and took over the running of the works Vauxhall 1997 BTCC entry, as well as owning three car dealerships in Southampton and Jersey. Originally set to be team principal, it was decided he would drive one of the cars alongside established Vauxhall driver John Cleland, winning a wet race at Knockhill in 1998. He retired from racing at the end of the year, but continued his involvement in the team for another three years.

Warwick now operates a Honda franchise in Jersey.

== Later life ==
Warwick notably deputised for Martin Brundle (who was racing at Le Mans) as Murray Walker's co-commentator on ITV for the 1998 Canadian Grand Prix. In 2005 and 2006, Warwick raced in the inaugural season of the Grand Prix Masters formula for retired Formula One drivers. In 2010, he served as the fourth steward for the Spanish and Hungarian Grands Prix. In 2011, Warwick served as the fourth steward for the 2011 Turkish Grand Prix. This role is given only to former racing drivers who advise the stewards panel on incidents from a driver perspective. He was president of the British Racing Drivers Club, after succeeding Damon Hill. Paddy Hopkirk replaced him as president of the BRDC in 2016.

In 2015, Warwick received treatment for bowel cancer.

== Racing record ==
=== Career summary ===
Season	Series	Team	Races	Wins	Poles	F/Laps	Podiums	Points	Position
1976	Formula Ford Festival	N/A	1	0	0	?	1	N/A	**2nd**
1977	BP Super Visco British Formula Three	Warwick Trailers	13	0	1	2	5	40	5th
1977	Vandervell British Formula Three	Warwick Trailers	6	0	2	0	2	41	**3rd**
1977	European Formula Three	Warwick Trailers	2	0	0	0	0	1	28th
1978	BP Super Visco British Formula Three	Warwick Trailers	16	3	3	2	10	72	**2nd**
1978	Vandervell British Formula Three	Warwick Trailers	9	3	3	6	8	162	**1st**
1978	European Formula Three	Warwick Trailers	3	1	1	0	2	13	6th
1978	Japanese Formula Two	N/A	1	0	0	0	0	0	NC
1979	European Formula Two	Theodore Racing	11	0	0	0	0	2	20th
1979	British Formula One	Theodore Racing	3	0	0	0	1	6	12th
1980	European Formula Two	Toleman Group Motorsport	11	1	4	1	7	42	**2nd**
1981	Formula One	Candy Toleman Motorsport	1	0	0	0	0	0	NC
1982	Formula One	Candy Toleman Motorsport	10	0	0	1	0	0	NC
1983	Formula One	Candy Toleman Motorsport	15	0	0	0	0	9	14th
1983	World Sportscar Championship	Porsche Kremer Racing	2	0	0	0	0	0	NC
1983	European Endurance Championship	John Fitzpatrick Racing	1	1	0	0	1	20	22nd
1984	Formula One	Équipe Renault Elf	16	0	0	1	4	23	7th
1985	Formula One	Équipe Renault Elf	15	0	0	0	0	5	14th
1986	Formula One	Olivetti Brabham	10	0	0	0	0	0	NC
1986	World Sportscar Championship	Silk Cut Jaguar	9	1	0	0	5	81	**3rd**
1986	IMSA GT Championship	BF Goodrich	1	0	0	0	1	0	NC
1987	Formula One	USF&G Arrows Megatron	16	0	0	0	0	3	16th
1988	Formula One	USF&G Arrows Megatron	16	0	0	0	0	17	8th
1989	Formula One	USF&G Arrows Ford	15	0	0	0	0	7	10th
1990	Formula One	Camel Team Lotus	16	0	0	0	0	3	14th
1990	World Rally Championship	Subaru Technica International	1	0	0	0	0	0	NC
1991	World Sportscar Championship	Silk Cut Jaguar	8	3	1	1	4	79	**2nd**
1991	IMSA GT Championship	Bud Light Jaguar	1	0	0	0	0	0	NC
1992	World Sportscar Championship	Peugeot Talbot Sport	6	3	2	1	5	98	**1st**
1993	Formula One	Footwork Mugen-Honda	16	0	0	0	0	4	16th
1995	British Touring Car Championship	Alfa Romeo Old Spice Racing	23	0	0	0	0	15	19th
1996	24 Hours of Le Mans	Courage Compétition	1	0	0	0	1	N/A	13th
1997	British Touring Car Championship	Vauxhall Sport	24	0	0	0	0	33	14th
1997	Bathurst 1000	Vauxhall Sport	1	0	0	0	0	N/A	6th
1998	British Touring Car Championship	Vauxhall Sport	26	1	0	0	2	70	9th
1998	Bathurst 1000	Team Vectra	1	0	0	0	0	N/A	5th
2005	Grand Prix Masters	Team Lixxus	1	0	0	0	0	0	5th
2006	Grand Prix Masters	Team Lixxus	2	0	0	0	0	2	6th
2007	Porsche Supercup	Porsche AG	1	0	0	0	0	0	NC†

† Not eligible for points due to being a guest driver.

=== Complete European Formula Two Championship results ===
(key) (Races in bold indicate pole position; races in italics indicate fastest lap)

Year	Entrant	Chassis	Engine	1	2	3	4	5	6	7	8	9	10	11	12	Pos.	Pts
1979	Toleman Group Motorsport	March 792	Hart	SIL; Ret	HOC; Ret	THR; Ret	NÜR; DNS	VAL; NC	MUG; 5	PAU; 9	HOC; Ret	ZAN; Ret	PER; Ret	MIS; Ret	DON; 10	20th	2
1980	Toleman Group Motorsport	Toleman TG280	Hart	**THR**; 2	HOC; Ret	NÜR; 3	**VAL**; 3	**PAU**; Ret	SIL; 1	ZOL; 4						**2nd**	**42**
1980	Toleman Group Motorsport	Toleman TG280B	Hart								**MUG**; 2	ZAN; 2	PER; 11	MIS; 3	HOC	**2nd**	**42**

=== Complete Formula One results ===
(key) (Races in bold indicate pole position; Races in italics indicate fastest lap)

Year	Entrant	Chassis	Engine	1	2	3	4	5	6	7	8	9	10	11	12	13	14	15	16	WDC	Pts
1981	Candy Toleman Motorsport	Toleman TG181	Hart 415T 1.5 L4t	USW	BRA	ARG	SMR; DNQ	BEL; DNQ	MON; DNPQ	ESP; DNQ	FRA; DNQ	GBR; DNQ	GER; DNQ	AUT; DNQ	NED; DNQ	ITA; DNQ	CAN; DNQ	CPL; Ret		NC	0
1982	Candy Toleman Motorsport	Toleman TG181C	Hart 415T 1.5 L4t	RSA; Ret	BRA; DNQ	USW; DNPQ														NC	0
1982	Toleman Group Motorsport	Toleman TG181C	Hart 415T 1.5 L4t				SMR; Ret	BEL; Ret	MON; DNQ	DET	CAN	NED; Ret	GBR; Ret	FRA; 15	GER; 10	AUT; Ret	SUI; Ret			NC	0
1982	Toleman Group Motorsport	Toleman TG183	Hart 415T 1.5 L4t															ITA; Ret	CPL; Ret	NC	0
1983	Candy Toleman Motorsport	Toleman TG183B	Hart 415T 1.5 L4t	BRA; 8	USW; Ret	FRA; Ret	SMR; Ret	MON; Ret	BEL; 7	DET; Ret	CAN; Ret	GBR; Ret	GER; Ret	AUT; Ret	NED; 4	ITA; 6	EUR; 5	RSA; 4		14th	9
1984	Équipe Renault Elf	Renault RE50	Renault EF4 1.5 V6t	BRA; Ret	RSA; 3	BEL; 2	SMR; 4	FRA; Ret	MON; Ret	CAN; Ret	DET; Ret	DAL; Ret	GBR; 2	GER; 3	AUT; Ret	NED; Ret	ITA; Ret	EUR; 11^{†}	POR; Ret	7th	23
1985	Équipe Renault Elf	Renault RE60	Renault EF4B 1.5 V6t	BRA; 10	POR; 7	SMR; 10^{†}	MON; 5	CAN; Ret	DET; Ret	FRA; 7										14th	5
1985	Équipe Renault Elf	Renault RE60B	Renault EF15 1.5 V6t								GBR; 5	GER; Ret	AUT; Ret	NED; Ret	ITA; Ret	BEL; 6	EUR; Ret	RSA	AUS; Ret	14th	5
1986	Olivetti Brabham	Brabham BT55	BMW M12/13/1 1.5 L4t	BRA	ESP	SMR	MON	BEL	CAN; Ret	DET; 10	FRA; 9	GBR; 8	GER; 7	HUN; Ret	AUT; DNS	ITA; Ret	POR; Ret	MEX; Ret	AUS; Ret	NC	0
1987	USF&G Arrows Megatron	Arrows A10	Megatron M12/13 1.5 L4t	BRA; Ret	SMR; 11^{†}	BEL; Ret	MON; Ret	DET; Ret	FRA; Ret	GBR; 5	GER; Ret	HUN; 6	AUT; Ret	ITA; Ret	POR; 13	ESP; 10	MEX; Ret	JPN; 10	AUS; Ret	16th	3
1988	USF&G Arrows Megatron	Arrows A10B	Megatron M12/13 1.5 L4t	BRA; 4	SMR; 9	MON; 4	MEX; 5	CAN; 7	DET; Ret	FRA; Ret	GBR; 6	GER; 7	HUN; Ret	BEL; 5	ITA; 4	POR; 4	ESP; Ret	JPN; Ret	AUS; Ret	8th	17
1989	USF&G Arrows Ford	Arrows A11	Ford Cosworth DFR 3.5 V8	BRA; 5	SMR; 5	MON; Ret	MEX; Ret	USA; Ret	CAN; Ret	FRA	GBR; 9	GER; 6	HUN; 10	BEL; 6	ITA; Ret	POR; Ret	ESP; 9	JPN; 6	AUS; Ret	10th	7
1990	Camel Team Lotus	Lotus 102	Lamborghini 3512 3.5 V12	USA; Ret	BRA; Ret	SMR; 7	MON; Ret	CAN; 6	MEX; 10	FRA; 11	GBR; Ret	GER; 8	HUN; 5	BEL; 11	ITA; Ret	POR; Ret	ESP; Ret	JPN; Ret	AUS; Ret	14th	3
1993	Footwork Mugen-Honda	Footwork FA13B	Mugen-Honda MF-351 HB 3.5 V10	RSA; 7^{†}	BRA; 9															16th	4
1993	Footwork Mugen-Honda	Footwork FA14	Mugen-Honda MF-351 HB 3.5 V10			EUR; Ret	SMR; Ret	ESP; 13	MON; Ret	CAN; 16	FRA; 13	GBR; 6	GER; 17	HUN; 4	BEL; Ret	ITA; Ret	POR; 15^{†}	JPN; 14^{†}	AUS; 10	16th	4

^{†} Driver did not finish the Grand Prix, but was classified as he completed over 90% of the race distance.

=== Complete World Sportscar Championship results ===
(key) (Races in bold indicate pole position) (Races in italics indicate fastest lap)

Year	Entrant	Class	Chassis	Engine	1	2	3	4	5	6	7	8	9	DC	Pts
1983	Porsche Kremer Racing	C	Kremer CK5	Porsche Type-935 3.0 L F6 t	MNZ	SIL	NÜR	LMS; Ret						NC	0
1983	Porsche Kremer Racing	C	Kremer CK5	Porsche Type-935 3.0 L F6 t					SPA; Ret	FUJ	KYA			NC	0
1986	Silk Cut Jaguar	C1	Jaguar XJR-6	Jaguar 6.5 L V12	MNZ; Ret	SIL; 1	LMS; Ret	NOR; 3	BRH; 4	JER; 3	NÜR; Ret	SPA; 2	FUJ; 3	3rd	81
1991	Silk Cut Jaguar	C1	Jaguar XJR-14	Jaguar HB 3.5 L V8	**SUZ**; NC	MNZ; 1	**SIL**; 1		NÜR; 1	MAG; 5	MEX; 6	AUT; 2		2nd	79
1991	Silk Cut Jaguar	C1	Jaguar XJR-12	Jaguar 7.4 L V12				LMS; 4						2nd	79
1992	Peugeot Talbot Sport	C1	Peugeot 905 Evo 1B	Peugeot SA35-A2 3.5 L V10	**MNZ**; 2	**SIL**; 1	LMS; 1	**DON**; 2	SUZ; 1	MAG; 5				1st	98

=== 24 Hours of Le Mans results ===
Year	Team	Co-Drivers	Car	Class	Laps	Pos.	Class Pos.
1983	(Germany) Porsche Kremer Racing	(France) Patrick Gaillard (Germany) Frank Jelinski	Porsche-Kremer CK5	C	76	DNF	DNF
1986	(United Kingdom) Silk Cut Jaguar (United Kingdom) Tom Walkinshaw Racing	(United States) Eddie Cheever (France) Jean-Louis Schlesser	Jaguar XJR-6	C1	239	DNF	DNF
1991	(United Kingdom) Silk Cut Jaguar (United Kingdom) Tom Walkinshaw Racing	(Denmark) John Nielsen (United Kingdom) Andy Wallace	Jaguar XJR-12	C1	356	4th	4th
1992	(France) Peugeot Talbot Sport	(France) Yannick Dalmas (United Kingdom) Mark Blundell	Peugeot 905 Evo 1B	C1	352	**1st**	**1st**
1996	(France) Courage Compétition	(United States) Mario Andretti (Netherlands) Jan Lammers	Courage C36-Porsche	LMP1	315	13th	**3rd**

=== Complete British Touring Car Championship results ===
(key) (Races in bold indicate pole position – 1 point awarded 1996 onwards all races) (Races in italics indicate fastest lap) (* signifies that driver lead feature race for at least one lap – 1 point awarded in 1998 only)

Year	Team	Car	1	2	3	4	5	6	7	8	9	10	11	12	13	14	15	16	17	18	19	20	21	22	23	24	25	26	Pos	Pts
1995	Alfa Romeo Old Spice Racing	Alfa Romeo 155 TS	DON; 1 Ret	DON; 2 Ret	BRH; 1; 12	BRH; 2 Ret	THR; 1; 12	THR; 2 Ret	SIL; 1; 16	SIL; 2; 17	OUL; 1 DNS	OUL; 2 DNS	BRH; 1; 8	BRH; 2; 11	DON; 1; 13	DON; 2 Ret	SIL; 1; 9	KNO; 1 Ret	KNO; 2; 16	BRH; 1; 8	BRH; 2; 14	SNE; 1 Ret	SNE; 2; 13	OUL; 1; 8	OUL; 2 Ret	SIL; 1; 8	SIL; 2; 10		19th	15
1997	Vauxhall Sport	Vauxhall Vectra	DON; 1; 9	DON; 2; 8	SIL; 1; 8	SIL; 2; 5	THR; 1; 15	THR; 2; 6	BRH; 1; 10	BRH; 2; 11	OUL; 1; 11	OUL; 2 Ret	DON; 1 Ret	DON; 2; 10	CRO; 1; 7	CRO; 2; 10	KNO; 1; 9	KNO; 2; 13	SNE; 1; 11	SNE; 2 Ret	THR; 1; 9	THR; 2; 8	BRH; 1 Ret	BRH; 2 Ret	SIL; 1 Ret	SIL; 2 Ret			14th	33
1998	Vauxhall Sport	Vauxhall Vectra	THR; 1; 12	THR; 2; 5	SIL; 1; 4	SIL; 2; 6*	DON; 1; 13	DON; 2; 8	BRH; 1; 11	BRH; 2; 13	OUL; 1; 11	OUL; 2 Ret	DON; 1 DSQ	DON; 2; 3	CRO; 1; 9	CRO; 2; 12	SNE; 1; 10	SNE; 2 Ret	THR; 1; 7	THR; 2 Ret	KNO; 1; 9	KNO; 2; 1	BRH; 1 Ret	BRH; 2; 14	OUL; 1; 10	OUL; 2; 5*	SIL; 1; 7	SIL; 2; 10	9th	70

=== Complete Bathurst 1000 results ===
Year	Team	Co-Driver	Car	Laps	Pos.	Ref
1997*	(United Kingdom) Vauxhall Sport	(Australia) Peter Brock	Vauxhall Vectra	148	6th	
1998*	(United Kingdom) Team Vectra	(United Kingdom) John Cleland	Vauxhall Vectra	157	5th	

* Super Touring race

=== Complete Grand Prix Masters results ===
(key) Races in bold indicate pole position, races in italics indicate fastest lap.

Year	Team	Chassis	Engine	1	2	3	4	5
2005	Team Lixxus	Delta Motorsport GPM	Nicholson McLaren 3.5 V8	RSA; 5				
2006	Team Lixxus	Delta Motorsport GPM	Nicholson McLaren 3.5 V8	QAT; 5	ITA; C	GBR; Ret	MAL; C	RSA; C

=== Complete Porsche Supercup results ===
(key) (Races in bold indicate pole position) (Races in italics indicate fastest lap)

Year	Team	1	2	3	4	5	6	7	8	9	10	11	DC	Points	Ref
2007	Porsche AG	BHR1	BHR2	ESP	MON	FRA	GBR; 27	GER	HUN	TUR	BEL	ITA	NC†	0†	

† Not eligible for points due to being a guest driver.

=== Complete WRC results ===
Year	Entrant	Car	1	2	3	4	5	6	7	8	9	10	11	12	WDC	Pts
1990	Subaru Technica International	Subaru Legacy RS	MON	POR	KEN	FRA	GRC	NZL	ARG	FIN	AUS	ITA	CIV	GBR; Ret	NC	0

== Helmet ==
Warwick's helmet is blue with the entire chin area white and a white stripe running across the top, in the chin area there is a stripe on each side, his name written and a Union Jack.

== Notes ==
Sporting positions
Preceded by Stephen South	British Formula 3 Championship; BRDC Series Champion; 1978	Succeeded by Chico Serra (Combined championship)
Preceded by Teo Fabi	World Sportscar Championship; Champion; 1992; With: Yannick Dalmas	Succeeded by None (Series ended)
Preceded by Volker Weidler; Johnny Herbert; Bertrand Gachot	Winner of the 24 Hours of Le Mans; 1992; With: Yannick Dalmas & Mark Blundell	Succeeded by Geoff Brabham; Christophe Bouchut; Éric Hélary
Preceded by Damon Hill	BRDC President; 2011 – 2017	Succeeded by Paddy Hopkirk
Awards
Preceded by John Watson	Hawthorn Memorial Trophy; 1984	Succeeded by Nigel Mansell
Preceded by Nigel Mansell	Hawthorn Memorial Trophy; 1988	Succeeded by Nigel Mansell
Preceded by Nigel Mansell	Autosport; British Competition Driver of the Year; 1992	Succeeded by Damon Hill
