= Bernard Dudot =

French engineer (born 1939)

- Born: 30 January 1939 (age 87); Nancy, France
- Education: Centre d'études supérieures des techniques industrielles - St Ouen
- Occupations: Engineering Director GP2 and GP3 series
- Employer(s): GP2 Series, GP3 Series

Bernard Dudot (French pronunciation: [beʁnaʁ dydo]) (born 30 January 1939) is a French engineer who was instrumental in the development of the turbo V6 and normally aspirated V10 engines of Formula One while working for Alpine and Renault. As of 2005, he is Head of Engineering of the GP2 Series. He has a similar role in GP3 Series since the creation of that category. He is also a consultant for Le Mans organisation.

== Career ==
=== Alpine and Renault years ===
In 1967 he joined Automobiles Alpine, after convincing Jean Rédélé. Rédelé commissioned him to organize a motor development department of their own to reduce dependence on those of Gordini, Mignotet and Moteur Moderne. There he began to develop a turbo engine, which would be one of the bases for the future Renault's Formula One turbo engine. In 1971, he tuned a R16’s engine to be mounted on a chassis designed by André de Cortanze for the French F3 Championship.

In 1973, before the merger between Alpine and Renault-Gordini, Jean Terramorsi, Chairman of the second company, sent Dudot to the United States to study the potential of turbo technology in motorsport. There he was finally convinced of the possibilities. Back in France, he went to work at the Renault Sport’s Viry-Châtillon factory where he and other developers (François Castaing and Jean-Pierre Boudy) began adapting the CH1 (a two-litre engine for F2 and Sport) to make it a smaller turbo engine.

In early 1975, Castaing took a more administrative role and Boudy went to the design office, so Dudot was left in charge of developing an engine for Le Mans and the secret design of the 1.5-litre turbo for Formula One. After some tests, the car fitted with the new and innovative Renault-Gordini EF1 engine, the RS01, debuted at the 1977 British Grand Prix.

In 1980, when Castaing was transferred to other activities within Renault and left Renault Sport, Dudot was appointed Technical Director. In 1986, he led the design of the EF15B power plant, which included for the first time in Formula One the pneumatic valve return, an innovation that would have a major impact on the era of atmospheric engines. At the end of that year, Renault ceased its turbo programme. Soon after, Patrick Faure entrusted to him to design a naturally aspirated engine in view of the regulations that would take effect from 1989. He devised a 3.5-litre V10 that was revolutionary at a time when other manufacturers were betting on the V8 and V12.

=== Prost Grand Prix, USA interlude and return to Renault ===
At the end of 1997 Renault left Formula One and Dudot was hired as Prost Grand Prix’s Technical Director on 1 November 1997, but in June 1999 he was replaced by Alan Jenkins. In 2001, he joined Nissan’s Infiniti engine programme in the Indy Racing League as Project Manager. On 26 February 2003, after some time with Menard, he was rehired by Renault as Deputy Managing Director in charge of the Renault F1 Team's engine department at Viry-Châtillon. He left that position on 1 April 2005 and his functions were divided between Rob White and André Lainé.
