= Renault RS01 =

Formula One racing car

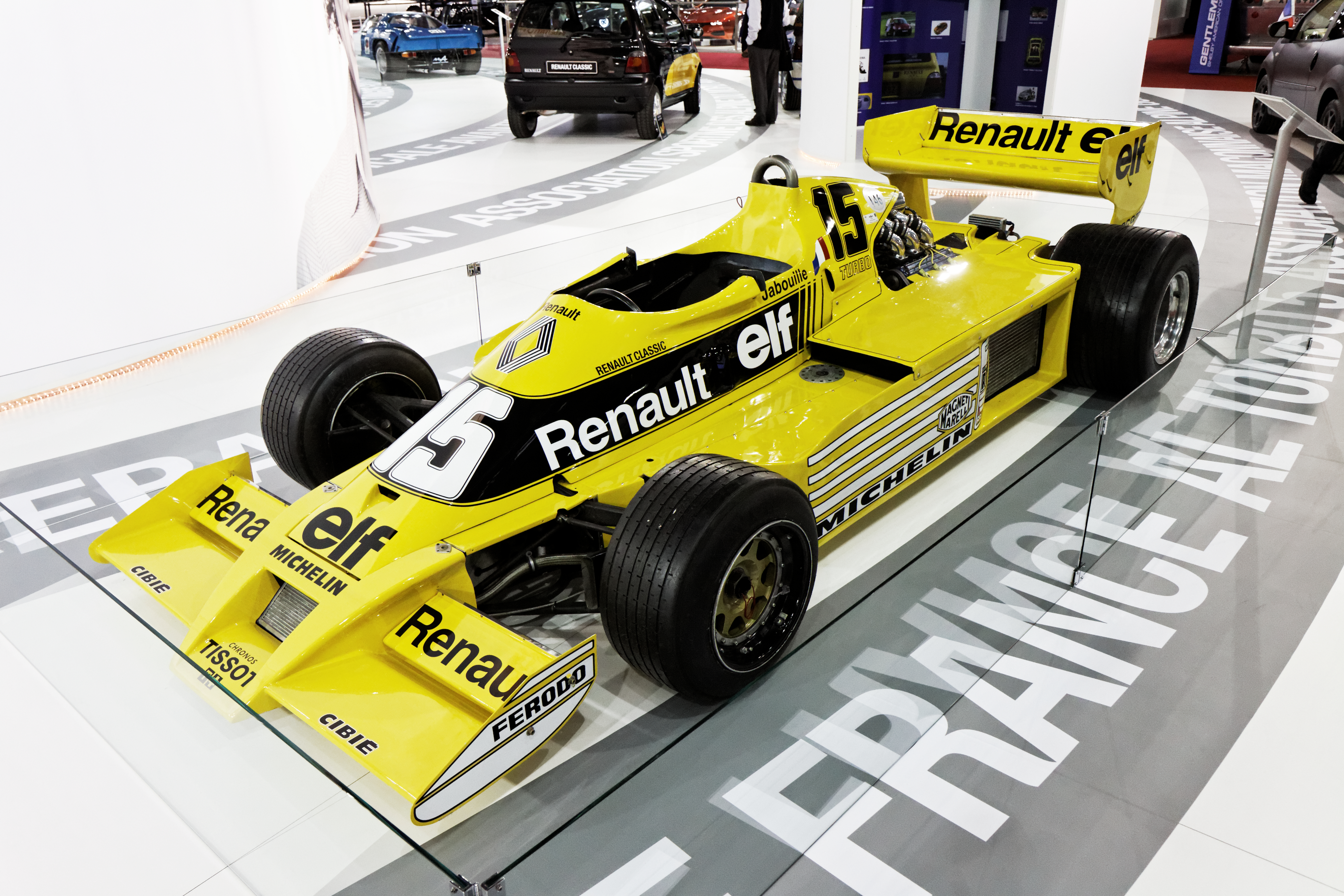
- The RS01 on display at the 2013 Rétromobile
- Category: Formula One
- Constructor: Renault
- Designers: François Castaing (Technical Director); André de Cortanze (Chief Designer); Jean-Pierre Jabouille (Engineering Director); Marcel Hubert (Head of Aerodynamics)
- Predecessor: Alpine A500
- Successor: RS10

Technical specifications
- Chassis: Aluminium monocoque
- Length: 4,500 mm (177.2 in)
- Width: 2,000 mm (78.7 in)
- Height: 1,200 mm (47.2 in)
- Axle track: 1,540 mm (60.6 in) (Front); 1,520 mm (59.8 in) (Rear)
- Wheelbase: 2,500 mm (98.4 in)
- Engine: Renault-Gordini EF1 1,496 cc (91.3 cu in), 90° V6, turbocharged, mid-engine, longitudinally-mounted
- Transmission: Hewland FGA 400 6-speed manual
- Power: 510 PS (375 kW; 503 hp) @ 11,000 rpm 372 N⋅m (274 lb⋅ft) @ 9,600 rpm
- Weight: 605–699 kg (1,334–1,541 lb)
- Fuel: Elf
- Tyres: Michelin

Competition history
- Notable entrants: Equipe Renault Elf
- Notable drivers: 15. (France) Jean-Pierre Jabouille; 16. (France) René Arnoux
- Debut: 1977 British Grand Prix
- Last event: 1979 Belgian Grand Prix
Races	Wins	Poles	F/Laps
25	0	1	0
- Constructors' Championships: 0
- Drivers' Championships: 0

The Renault RS01 was the first Formula One car to be powered by a turbocharged engine. It was also the first to use radial tyres, which were provided by Michelin. The RS01 was the first car designed by the newly formed Renault Sport division, formed by merging the Alpine and Gordini competition departments, hence the name.

== Development ==
During the latter half of the 1970s, Team Lotus had introduced ground effects with the Lotus 78, while Tyrrell had developed the six-wheeled Tyrrell P34. Renault continued to innovate with their car, drawing on the knowledge gained from their turbocharged 2.0-litre V6 engine used in Sports car racing which culminated in finishing second at the 1977 24 Hours of Le Mans and winning in 1978, proving that Renault's turbocharged engines could not only be powerful, but reliable.

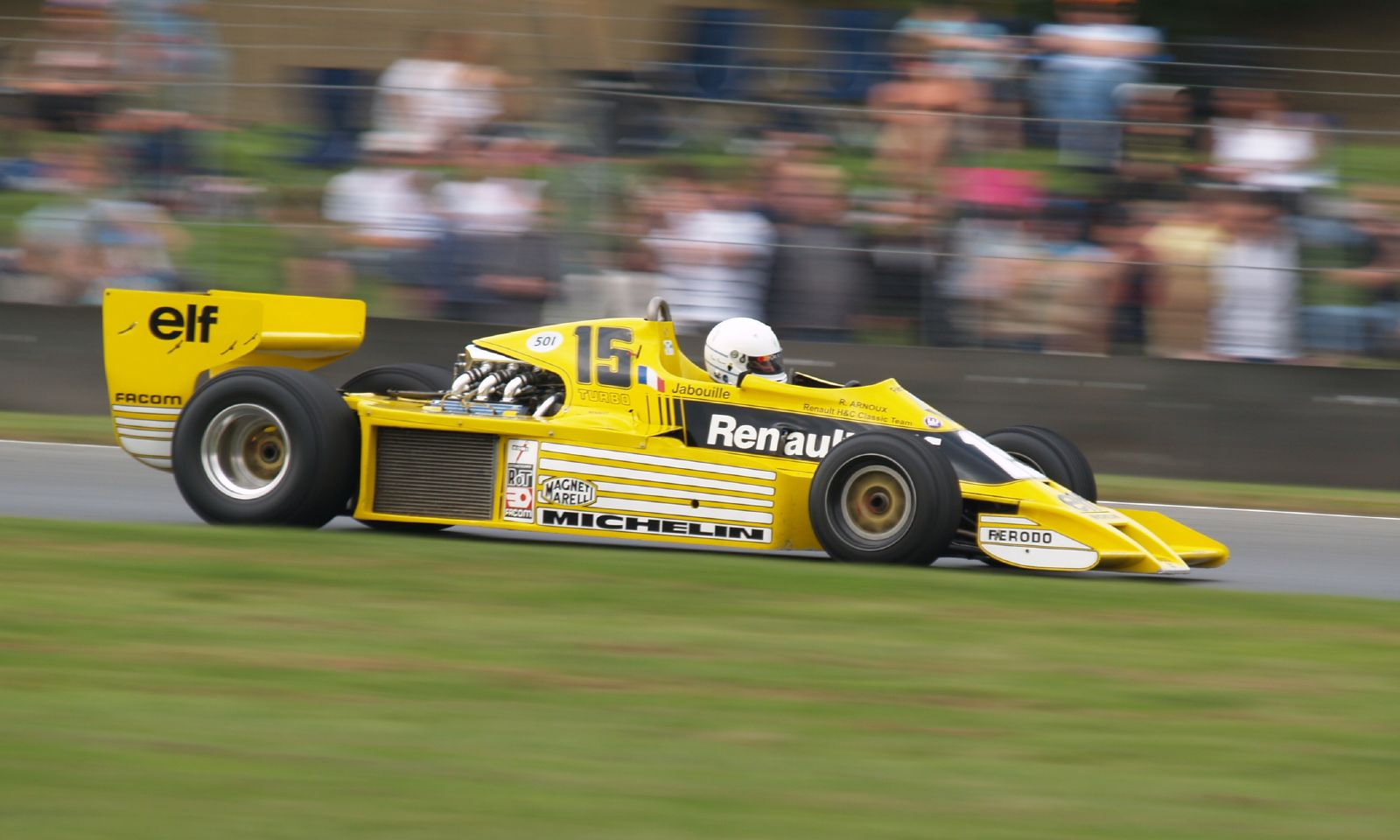
An ex-Jean-Pierre Jabouille Renault RS01 being demonstrated by René Arnoux in 2007.

The rules of F1 at the time permitted 3.0 litre naturally-aspirated engines, with a clause for a 1.5 litre supercharged or turbocharged engine. None of the teams had pursued this avenue, and stuck to Ford Cosworth DFV engines, whilst Ferrari, Matra and Alfa Romeo concentrated on developing Flat-12 engines for their cars and for their customer teams Ligier and Brabham. Leading French car manufacturer Renault decided to develop a 1.5 litre turbocharged engine, and a car to accompany the powerplant. Renault depended on lessons learned from the Alpine A500, a never-raced, turbocharged F1 car developed in 1975 and 1976 as a rolling laboratory for the new engine technology. The A500 had been developed by André de Cortanze and André Renut from an F2 chassis; the engine team visited the US to glean insights from the use of turbocharging in USAC Sprint car racing. The A500 had even more pronounced reliability and turbo lag problems than did the RS01, which did receive an entirely new from the ground up chassis layout.

Designed by Cortanze and Jean-Pierre Jabouille, it first appeared at the 1977 British Grand Prix – becoming the first car with forced induction to compete in a Formula One race since the BRM Type 15 in 1951. The resulting RS01 was cumbersome in appearance and also overweight, but it was nothing more than an experimental test car at this stage. Jabouille, who was also the team's sole driver, worked hard to develop it. The engine block was made in cast iron to withstand the pressures of turbocharging, whilst the chassis itself was kept as uncomplicated as possible to not stand in the way of engine development. The initial cars featured a single turbocharger and mechanical fuel injection from Kugelfischer.

The chassis was built up from steel plates and featured a typical, double A-arm front suspension with inboard-mounted coil springs (similar to that of the A500) and a rear four-link suspension with lower parallel arms. Renault was also forced to depend on British manufacturers: the brakes came from Lockheed and the gearbox was a Hewland FGA400-6. The introductory bodyshape was reminiscent of the Tyrrell P34, with a wide, rounded front spoiler that looked more sportscarlike than open-wheeled races and with a similar cockpit enclosure as well. The look of the car was frequently revised as experience was gained, however, and was entirely different by the time the RS01 was replaced.

== Race history ==
The RS01 was chronically unreliable, earning the nickname 'the yellow teapot' from rival teams (as it tended to blow up fairly regularly, usually in a cloud of white smoke), but Jabouille and the team pressed on throughout the rest of 1977 and 1978 until scoring the car's first points, a fourth place at the 1978 United States Grand Prix at Watkins Glen. The car had been developed so much it barely resembled the chunky machine that it had been when it first appeared, and the team's performance picked up throughout the season. Reliability improved, as the huge turbo lag had been overcome with the use of twin turbochargers.

The RS01 started the 1979 season for the team, with Jabouille scoring the first pole position for a turbo car at the South African Grand Prix at Kyalami, a circuit located at high altitude where the thinner air saw the turbos operating at their maximum while the naturally aspirated cars such as the flat 12 Ferrari and Alfa Romeos, and the V8 Cosworth DFV, actually lost approximately 20% of their power compared to at sea level.

Within three years most of the other teams would begin adopting turbochargers for themselves, with Ferrari, Alfa, and other manufacturers such as BMW, Honda and Porsche all supplying turbocharged engines.

== Complete Formula One results ==
(key) (results in bold indicate pole position; results in italics indicate fastest lap)

Year	Entrant	Engine	Tyres	Drivers	1	2	3	4	5	6	7	8	9	10	11	12	13	14	15	16	17	Points	WCC
1977	Equipe Renault Elf	Renault-Gordini EF1; 1.5L V6 (tc)	M		ARG	BRA	RSA	USW	ESP	MON	BEL	SWE	FRA	GBR	GER	AUT	NED	ITA	USA	CAN	JPN	**0**	NC
1977	Equipe Renault Elf	Renault-Gordini EF1; 1.5L V6 (tc)	M	(France) Jean-Pierre Jabouille										Ret			Ret	Ret	Ret	DNQ		**0**	NC
1978	Equipe Renault Elf	Renault-Gordini EF1; 1.5L V6 (tc)	M		ARG	BRA	RSA	USW	MON	BEL	ESP	SWE	FRA	GBR	GER	AUT	NED	ITA	USA	CAN		**3**	12th
1978	Equipe Renault Elf	Renault-Gordini EF1; 1.5L V6 (tc)	M	(France) Jean-Pierre Jabouille			Ret	Ret	10	NC	13	Ret	Ret	Ret	Ret	Ret	Ret	Ret	4	12		**3**	12th
1979	Equipe Renault Elf	Renault-Gordini EF1; 1.5L V6 (tc)	M		ARG	BRA	RSA	USW	ESP	BEL	MON	FRA	GBR	GER	AUT	NED	ITA	CAN	USA			**26***	6th
1979	Equipe Renault Elf	Renault-Gordini EF1; 1.5L V6 (tc)	M	(France) Jean-Pierre Jabouille	Ret	10	**Ret**	DNS														**26***	6th
1979	Equipe Renault Elf	Renault-Gordini EF1; 1.5L V6 (tc)	M	(France) René Arnoux	Ret	Ret	Ret	DNS	9	Ret												**26***	6th

- All points were scored using the Renault RS10

== Sources ==
- The Concise Encyclopedia of Formula One by David Tremayne
