= Wang Xuning =

Chinese entrepreneur

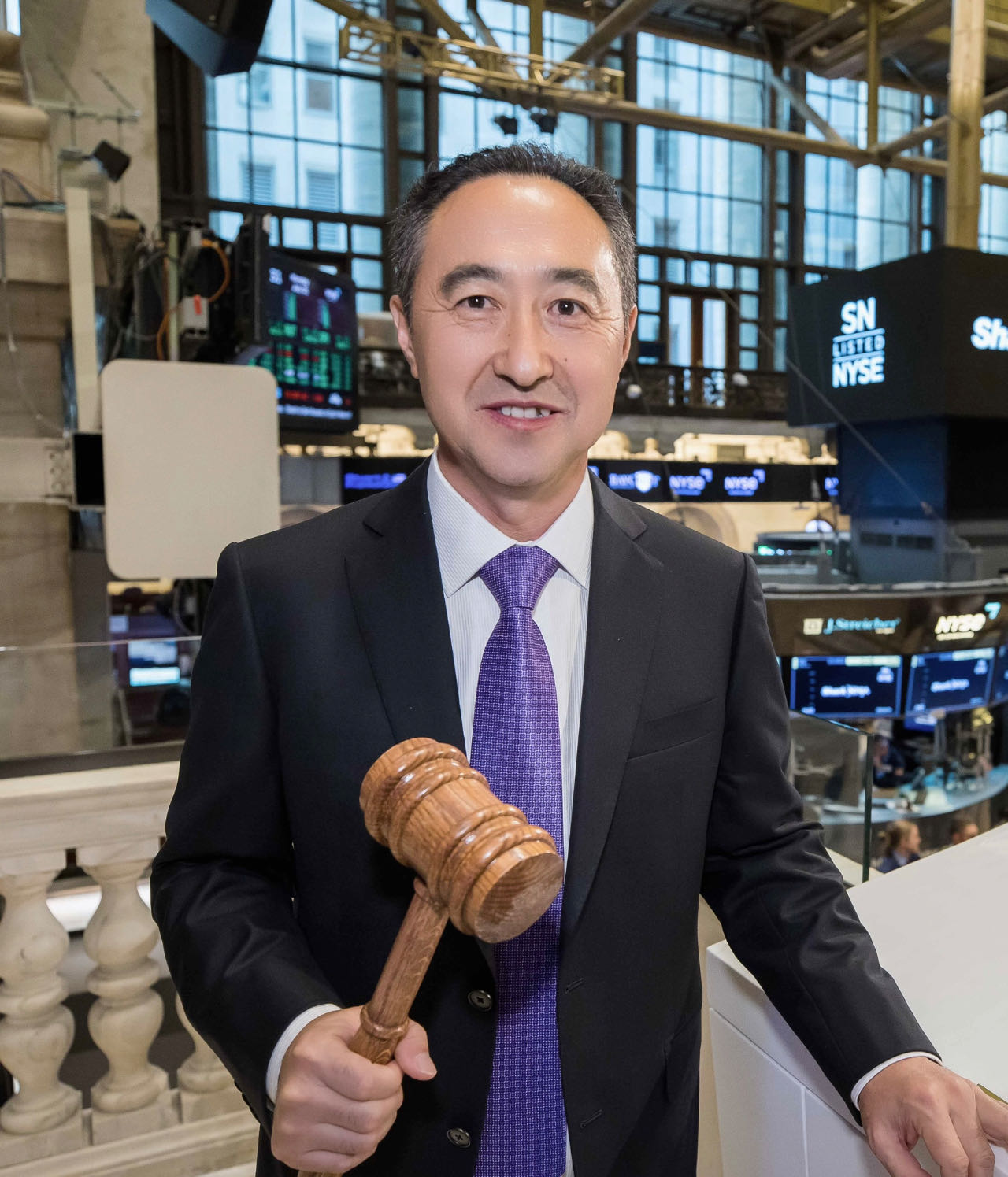
CJ Xuning Wang at the New York Stock Exchange, 2023

Wang Xuning (Chinese: 王旭宁; pinyin: Wáng Xùníng; born 1969 in Shandong, China), also known as CJ Xuning Wang or CJ Wang, is a Chinese billionaire entrepreneur and philanthropist. He is credited with inventing the automatic soymilk maker in 1994. He is the founder of Joyoung, a Chinese kitchen appliance company, and currently serves as the chairman and refounder of JS Global Lifestyle and SharkNinja, both global consumer appliance groups.

== Career ==
Wang studied electrical engineering at Beijing Jiaotong University and followed his parents profession into teaching after graduation. During this time, he realized the beverage beloved throughout China, soymilk, was laboriously complicated to make. He sought to design a machine that allowed people to quickly make soymilk at home. Wang left his teaching job in 1994 and soon invented the first automated home soymilk maker that year, under the company name Joyoung.

After years of significant alterations to the Joyoung soymilk maker, including adding a self cleaning function in 1999, and fierce competition, Wang drove Joyoung to control 80% of the Chinese soymilk maker market by 2000. Joyoung later expanded into a wide range of small kitchen appliances, and Wang’s business focus on innovation, marketing, and “making people’s lives easier” are all evident in the growth of Joyoung.

Wang took the company public on the Shenzhen Stock Exchange in 2008. Joyoung has since become one of China's best-known brand in small kitchen appliances.

In 2017, Wang acquired SharkNinja with a plan to “re-found” the company and unlock its full potential. Drawing on his experience with Joyoung, he developed a transformation plan centered on four priorities: broadening SharkNinja’s product portfolio, strengthening its in-house R&D, diversifying the supply chain, and digitizing its go-to-market strategy.

In 2019 SharkNinja merged with Joyoung to form JS Global Lifestyle. In the same year, JS Global publicly listed in Hong Kong. In 2023 Wang spun off SharkNinja for a direct listing in New York.

Since Wang acquired the company in 2017, SharkNinja increased its number of employees fourfold, reaching over 4,100 in 2026, mostly centered in the US but also across Europe and Asia-Pacific. Its annual revenue also grew from $1.3 billion to $6.4 billion over the same period.

== Philanthropy ==
In 2017, Wang made a philanthropic contribution to Western Reserve Academy in Hudson, Ohio, which led to the naming of the Wang Innovation Center, a facility focused on creativity and hands-on learning. In 2026, his CJ Wang Foundation committed more funds to double the size of the facility and rename it the Wang Makerspace.

He also contributed to charitable causes in China. In 2021, Wang donated 50 million RMB to the Joyoung Public Welfare Foundation, which supports education and nutrition initiatives at elementary schools in rural China.

In 2026, Wang became a permanent donor to the Future Science Prize, an award recognizing scientific achievements in life sciences, physical sciences, mathematics, and computer science.
