= JSS =

JSS may refer to:

== Arts and media ==
- "JSS" (The Walking Dead), a 2015 episode of the American TV series
- Journal of the Siam Society, published in Thailand

== Businesses and organisations ==
- Janathipathiya Samrakshana Samithy, an Indian political party
- Japan Statistical Society, a learned society
- Jet Stream International (ICAO code: JSS), a Pakistani airline
- Jönköpings SS, a Swedish swimming club
- Joyson Safety Systems, an American automotive company

== Education ==
- James Striar School of General Jewish Studies
- Japanese School of Suzhou, China
- Junior Solar Sprint, United States
- Jurong Secondary School, Singapore

== Military ==
- Joint Security Stations, components of 2007's Operation Imposing Law in Iraq
- Joint support ship, a multi-role naval vessel
- Joint Surveillance System, a USAF and FAA system for the atmospheric air defense of North America
- Protecteur-class auxiliary vessel (previously the Joint Support Ship Project), naval auxiliaries for the Royal Canadian Navy

== Other uses ==
- Network Security Services for Java (JSS), a programming library component

== See also ==
- JS (disambiguation)
- JS2 (disambiguation)
