= JS-1 =

JS-1, JS1, or variant, may refer to:

- JS-1 heavy tank, Josef Stalin 1 Soviet WWII tank
- Ligier JS1, 1969-1970 sportscar from Ligier
- ECMAscript 1.0 (JS1.0), JavaScript standard, see JavaScript
- JScript 1.0 (MS JS 1.0), Microsoft Javascript variant, see JScript
- Oldsmobile Jetstar I (JS1) 1960s sedan
- Jonker JS-1 Revelation, sailplane
- JS1 (phylum), a candidatus phylum of bacteria now called afribacteria
- Choa Chu Kang MRT/LRT station, Singapore, station code JS1

== See also ==
- WinJS 1.0, Windows Library for JavaScript
- JSI (disambiguation)
- JS (disambiguation)
