= JS3 =

JS-3, JS3, or variation, may refer to:

- JS-3 heavy tank, the "Josef Stalin 3" Soviet WWII tank
- Ligier JS3, French sportscar racecar built by Ligier from 1971
- ECMAscript 3.0 (JS3.0), JavaScript standard, see JavaScript
- JScript 3.0 (MS JS 3.0), Microsoft Javascript variant, see JScript
- Jonker JS-3 Rapture, a glider
- Tengah MRT station, Singapore, station code JS3

== See also ==
- JSSS (JavaScript Style Sheets)
- 3JS, Dutch band
- Three.js, crossplatform Javascript browser library
- WinJS 3.0, Windows Library for JavaScript
- JS (disambiguation)
