= JS2 =

JS2, JS-2, or variation, may refer to:

- JS 9 mm (CS/LS2) 9mm pistol
- JS-2 heavy tank, Josef Stalin 2 Soviet WWII tank
- Ligier JS2, 1970s mid-engined sports coupe from Ligier
- ECMAscript 2.0 (JS2.0), JavaScript standard, see JavaScript
- JScript 2.0 (MS JS 2.0), Microsoft Javascript variant, see JScript
- Choa Chu Kang West MRT station, Singapore, station code JS2

== See also ==
- WinJS 2.0, Windows Library for JavaScript
- JS (disambiguation)
- JSS (disambiguation)
