= Next-Generation Logistics Ship =

U. S. Navy program

The Next-Generation Logistics Ship (NGLS) is a programme being undertaken by the United States Navy to construct a fleet of medium-sized auxiliary ships that will provide underway replenishment (UNREPS), disaster relief and logistics capabilities for combined land and sea operations. These new vessels are not intended to replace existing classes such as the John Lewis-class replenishment oilers (AO) and the Supply-class fast combat support ships (AOE) but to supplement their operations, especially in littoral waters and combat zones where larger vessels cannot be risked.

The programme commenced in 2020 and potential suppliers contacted in 2021, with the first vessel expected to be delivered in 2025.

== Background ==
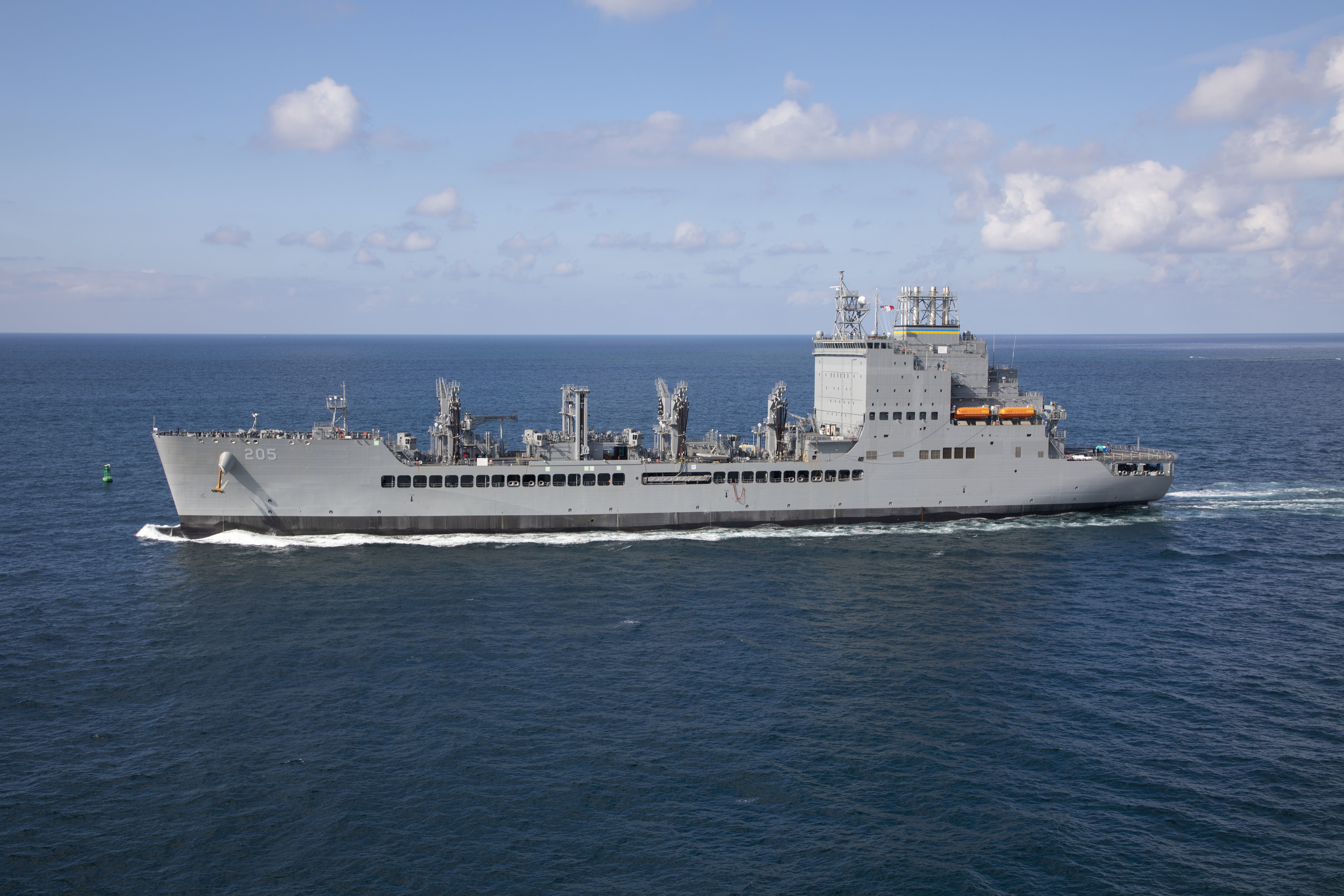
John Lewis-class AO

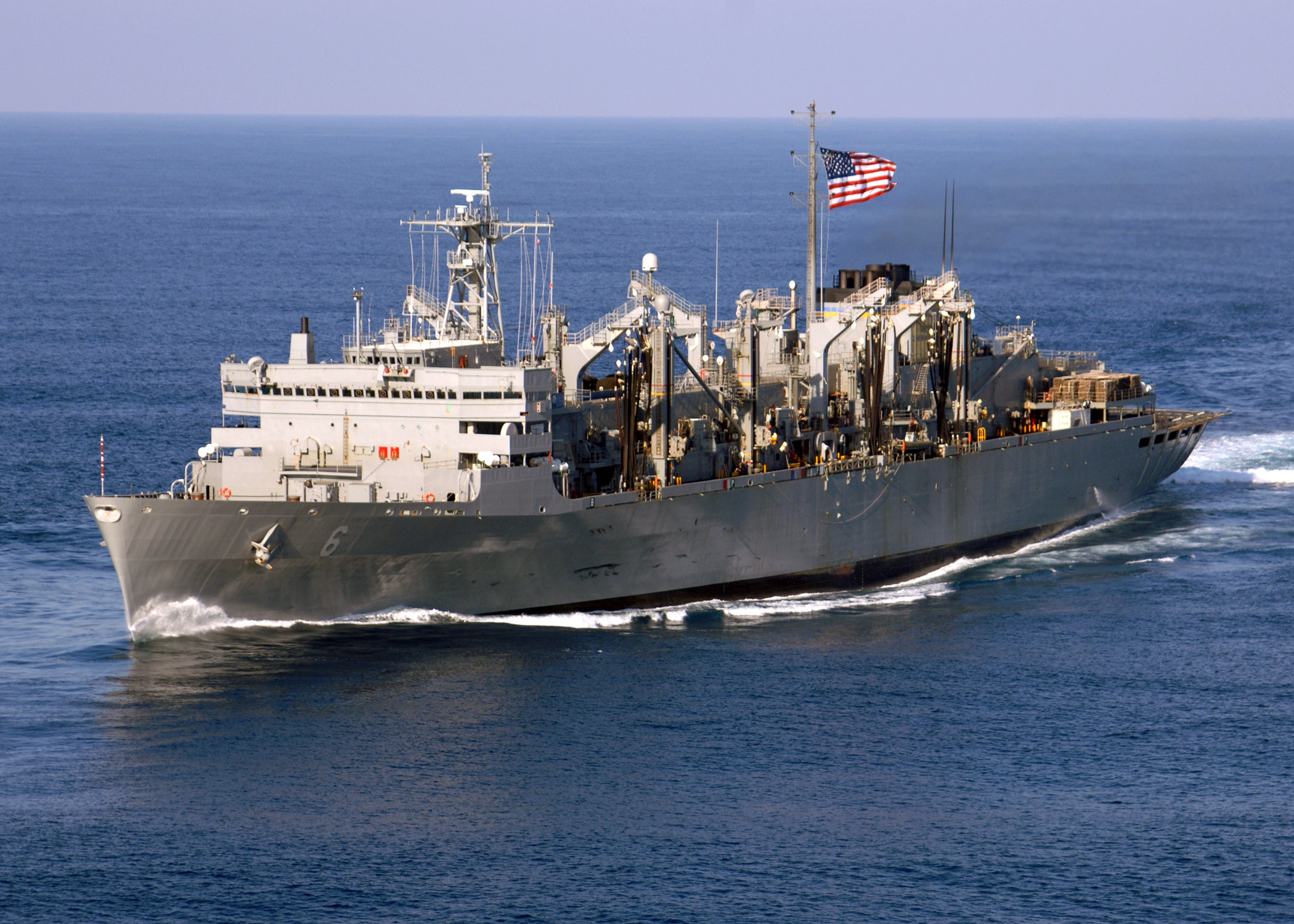
Supply-class AOE

The US Navy (USN), through the Military Sealift Command (MSC), operates a Combat Logistics Force (CLF), a large fleet of auxiliary ships responsible for refuelling, rearming, and resupplying its combat fleets. However, unlike the vessels they support, CLF vessels are not commissioned ships and are operated by mostly civilian crews. Although these vessels are traditionally quite large and expensive they are equipped with only limited defensive capabilities at best, and are unsuitable for high risk operations especially in littoral regions where water depth and manoeuvring room is often limited.

A primary goal of the USN in times of conflict is anti-access/area-denial (A2/AD), the creation of “no-go zones” for opposing forces. However, larger vessels represent high-value targets and their loss to enemy action can have serious operational and strategic consequences. Therefore, the USN has adopted a doctrine of more distributed fleets with a reduced proportion of larger ships and an increased proportion of smaller ships such as frigates and littoral combat ships, thus lessening the risks posed by concentrated attacks on a relatively small number of large vessels.

To satisfy this emerging doctrine, the NGLS programme commenced in May 2020 with Naval Sea Systems Command (NAVSEA) examining the possibility of adopting or adapting existing commercial vessels that may be able to fulfil its needs, and in February 2021 envisaged the construction of a new class of ships that would be smaller and individually less expensive and faster to procure than the current CLF vessels. (Note: The John Lewis-class replenishment oilers currently under construction are large vessels measuring 746 ft (227.4 m) in length with a displacement of around 50,000 tonnes under full load. They have an estimated cost of more than $700 million each and are built at a rate of just one ship per year.) The new vessels would have a reduced size and capacity compared to traditional auxiliary ships, and rather than supporting capital ships such as aircraft carriers and cruisers, will support smaller ships either deployed independently or as part of a squadron or small flotilla.

The Navy’s five-year shipbuilding plan for financial years 2023-2027 outlines the procurement of the first NGLS in 2026 at a cost of $150 million and the second in 2027 at $156 million, each around the fifth of the cost of a John Lewis-class vessel. It is not yet determined how many vessels will be constructed but the 30-year plan commencing 2023 proposes at least a dozen or so ships, and perhaps twice that number or more.

== Design ==
In December 2021 NAVSEA selected three US shipyards and awarded each $2 million to undertake conceptual design studies for a proposed vessel; the shipyards were:

- Austal USA of Mobile, Alabama
- Bollinger Shipyards of Lockport, Louisiana
- TAI Engineers of New Orleans, Louisiana

It is envisaged that rather than a single type the new vessels will be a family of ships built upon a common modular design, and will fulfil the roles traditionally provided by:

- dry cargo and ammunition ships (AKEs)
- fast combat support ships (AOEs)
- replenishment oilers (AOs)

While designs are yet to be published, Austal anticipates that their vessel will be similar in size and layout to the Russian Navy's Project 03182 small seagoing tanker Vice Admiral Paromov delivered to the Black Sea Fleet in 2021. This vessel features:

- displacement (full load) 3,500 tonnes
- length 78.8 m (258 ft 6 in)
- width 15.4 m (50 ft 6 in)
- draft 5 m (16 ft 5 in)
- forward superstructure
- amidships UNREPS station
- rear deck for one helicopter
- deck crane for launching and recovering small boats e.g. RHIBs

The contracted companies have the option of modifying existing military or commercial ship designs, rather than designing a completely new vessel.

== See also ==
- Joint support ship
