= JSI =

JSI may refer to:

- Japan Science Institute, now IBM Research – Tokyo, a Japanese research lab
- John Shea Insurance Canada Cup Qualifier, a former Canadian curling bonspiel
- John Snow, Inc, an American public health research and consulting firm
- Skiathos Island National Airport, in Greece
- Jožef Stefan Institute, a scientific institute located in Ljubljana, Slovenia

== See also ==
- JS-1 (disambiguation)
