= SharkNinja =

Global product design and technology company

SharkNinja, Inc.
- Formerly: Euro-Pro Operating LLC
- Type: Public
- Traded as: NYSE: SN; S&P 400 component
- Industry: Small home appliances
- Founded: 1994; 32 years ago
- Founder: Mark Rosenzweig
- Headquarters: Needham, Massachusetts, U.S.
- Key people: Mark Barrocas (CEO)
- Brands: Shark; Ninja
- Revenue: ▲US$6.399 billion (2025)
- Operating income: ▲US$920.3 million (2025)
- Net income: ▲US$701.4 million (2025)
- Total assets: ▲US$5.3 billion (2025)
- Total equity: ▲US$2.6 billion (2025)
- Number of employees: 3,000
- Website: www.sharkninja.com

SharkNinja, Inc. is an American product design and technology company based in Needham, Massachusetts. It was founded in 1994 by Mark Rosenzweig and led by CEO Mark Barrocas, who joined the company in 2008 as president. The company's name is formed by combining its two primary brands: Shark and Ninja.

SharkNinja's product portfolio spans 35 household sub-categories, across cleaning, cooking, food preparation, home environment and beauty. SharkNinja grew from less than $250 million in net sales for the 12 months ended March 31, 2008 to over $4.3 billion in net sales for the fiscal year ending December 31, 2023. It is a U.S. public company listed on the NYSE.

== History ==
The company has its origins in Euro-Pro Operating LLC in 1994, when Mark Rosenzweig of Montreal, whose family had run the business for generations prior to its incorporation, developed steam cleaners and upright vacuums. In 2003, Rosenzweig moved the headquarters from Montreal to Needham, Massachusetts.

Rosenzweig founded the Shark brand in 2007 with the launch of the No-Loss-of-Suction vacuum technology. Shortly thereafter, Mark Barrocas became SharkNinja's president, and the Ninja brand was launched in 2009.

The company changed its name in 2015 to capitalize on its brand names' prominence and popularity. In 2013, the company registered an entity in the United Kingdom and began selling products in the UK under the Shark brand.

In 2017, CDH Private Equity acquired a stake in the company. It was then structured as a subsidiary of JS Global, an investment holding company. SharkNinja accounted for almost half of JS Global's revenue in 2018.

On July 31, 2023, SharkNinja completed its separation from JS Global and became an independent public company, with its ordinary shares trading on the New York Stock Exchange under the ticker "SN".

Time magazine has listed SharkNinja as one of the 100 most influential companies in the world.

In 2025, SharkNinja was featured in the Brad Pitt movie F1 as a sponsor of the fictional APXGP racing team of which Pitt's character is a part. The SharkNinja logo is featured prominently on the team's uniforms, helmets and cars, and some of its products make brief cameos in the film.

In 2026, SharkNinja's stock price reached an all-time high, and the company announced that it would repurchase $750 million worth of its own stock.

== Lawsuits ==
In 2014, Dyson sued SharkNinja for infringement of three vacuum technology patents. After a four-year court case, the court ruled that the patents had not been infringed.

In 2019, SharkNinja sued the manufacturer of the Emeril Lagasse Pressure AirFryer for patent infringement, but the case was dismissed.

In January 2021, iRobot sued SharkNinja for false advertising and patent infringement related to robotic vacuum cleaners. As of March 2023, the case was still pending before the United States International Trade Commission.

In October 2023, SharkNinja was sued over an allegedly misleading advertisement claiming that their frying pans, which are coated using titanium and ceramic plasma for an extremely scratch-proof and non-stick surface, are "heated to 30,000 °F (16,600 °C; 16,900 K)", which is about three times the effective temperature of the Sun (9,930 °F [5,499 °C; 5,772 K]) and six times the boiling point of aluminum (4,478 °F [2,470 °C; 2,743 K]). In contrast, the pans are rated for cooking at temperatures only up to 500 °F (260 °C; 533 K). The case was dismissed without prejudice in October 2024.
