= JS Global Lifestyle =

Chinese home appliance manufacturer

JS Global Lifestyle Co., Ltd.
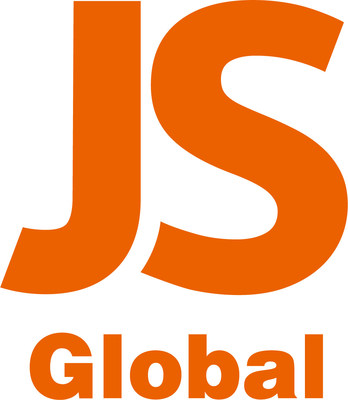
- Type: Public
- Traded as: SEHK: 1691
- Founded: October 2017; 8 years ago
- Headquarters: Hangzhou, Zhejiang, China
- Subsidiaries: Joyoung (67.16%)
- Website: www.jsgl.com

JS Global Lifestyle Co., Ltd. (Chinese: JS环球生活) is a Chinese manufacturer of small appliances based in Hangzhou. Joyoung founder Wang Xuning formed JS Global as a holding company in October 2017 after he acquired US-based SharkNinja. The company began trading on the Hong Kong Stock Exchange on 19 December 2019.

At the time of the company's IPO on the Hong Kong Stock Exchange, Joyoung, Shark and Ninja were its three major brands, with Joyoung being focused on the Chinese market whereas Shark and Ninja was focused on the US market. The earnings of the company's SharkNinja division as a share of the company's total earnings grew from 30.5% in 2017 to 55.1% in 2018.

On July 31, 2023, SharkNinja spun off from JS Global and became a U.S. public company listed on the NYSE.
