= Joint support ship =

Type of naval ship

A joint support ship (JSS) is a multi-role naval vessel capable of launching and supporting joint amphibious and airlift operations. It can also provide command and control, sealift and seabasing, underway replenishment, disaster relief and logistics capabilities for combined land and sea operations.

== Background ==
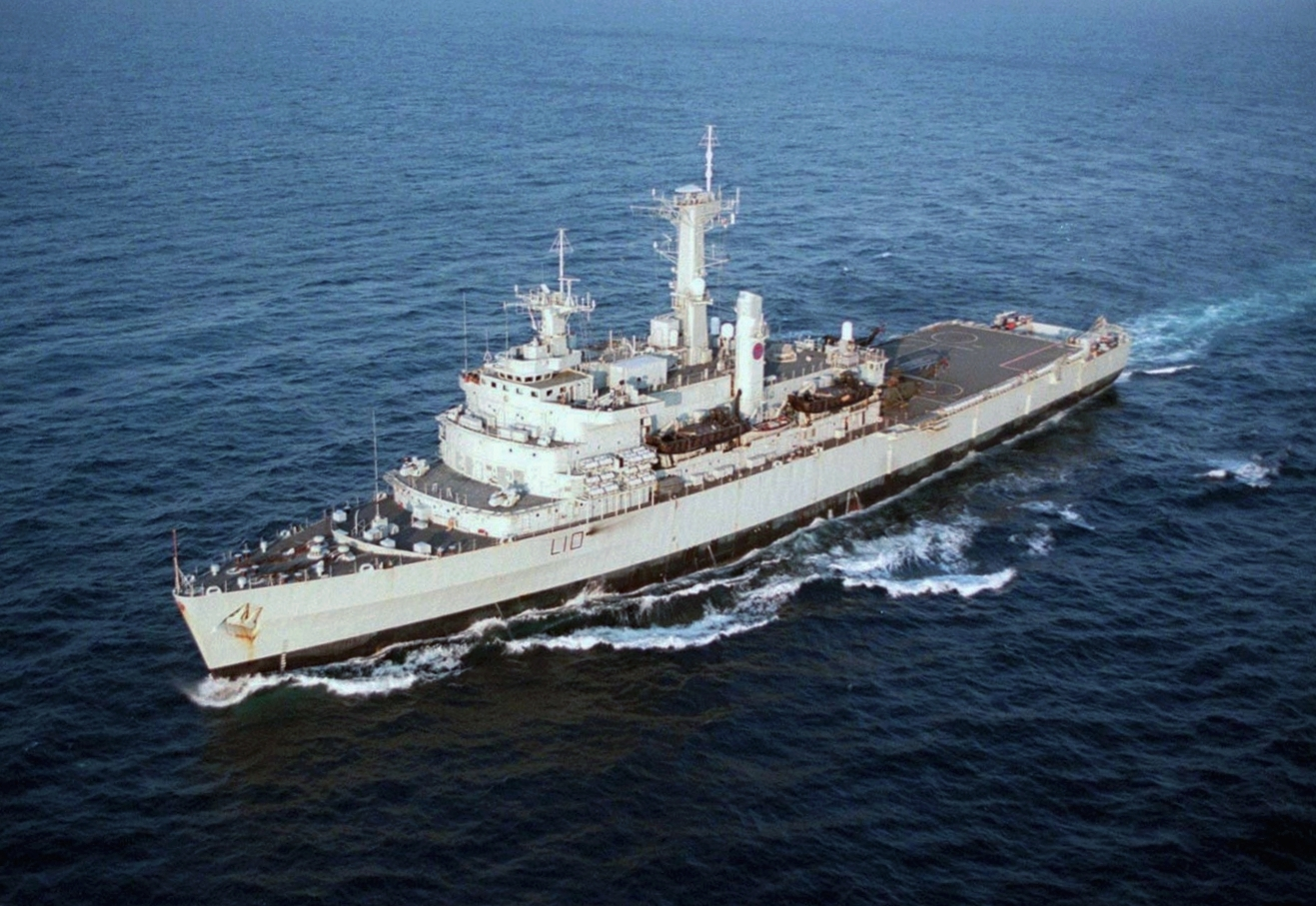
HMS Fearless, which entered service in 1965

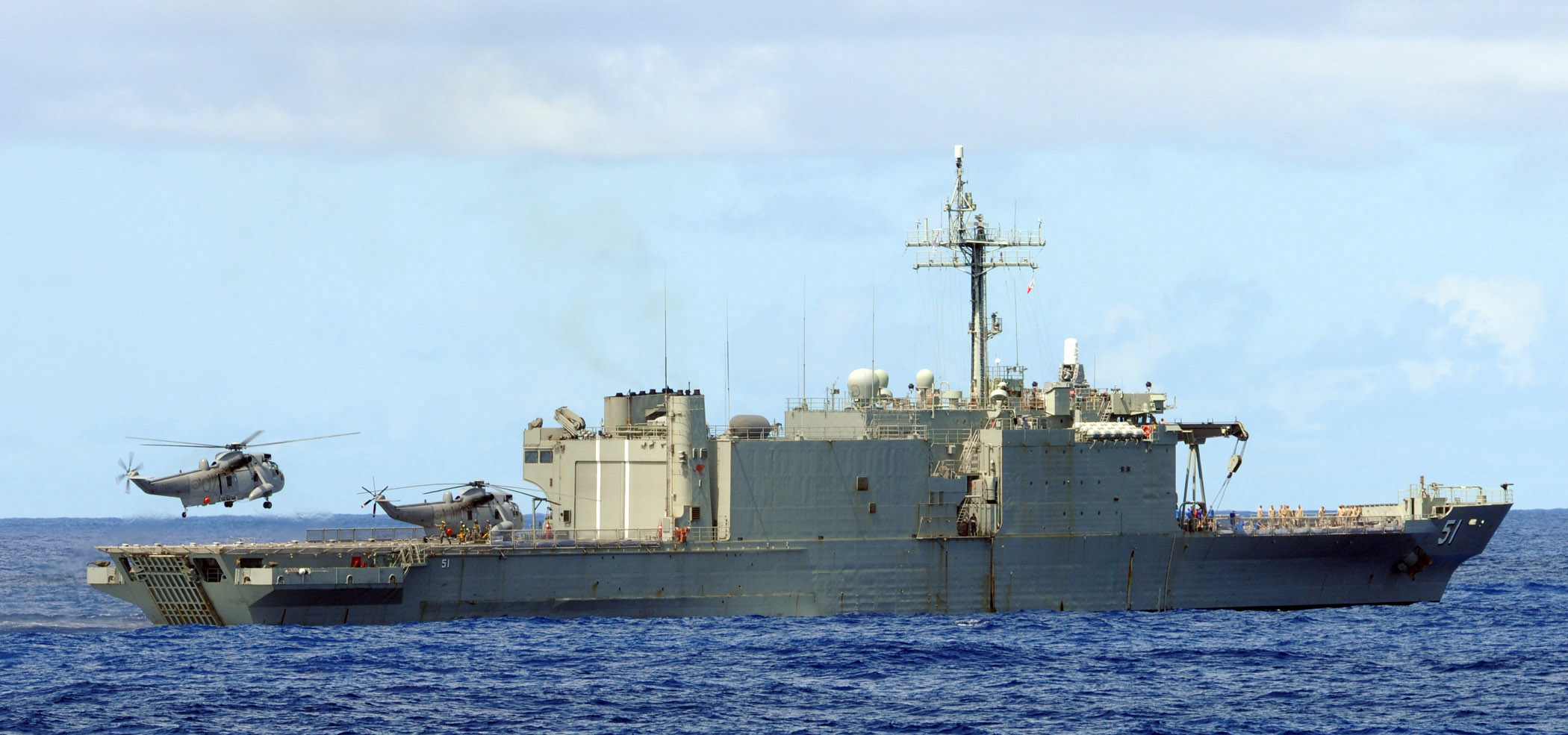
HMAS Kanimbla, which served as a command and control ship during the 2003 invasion of Iraq

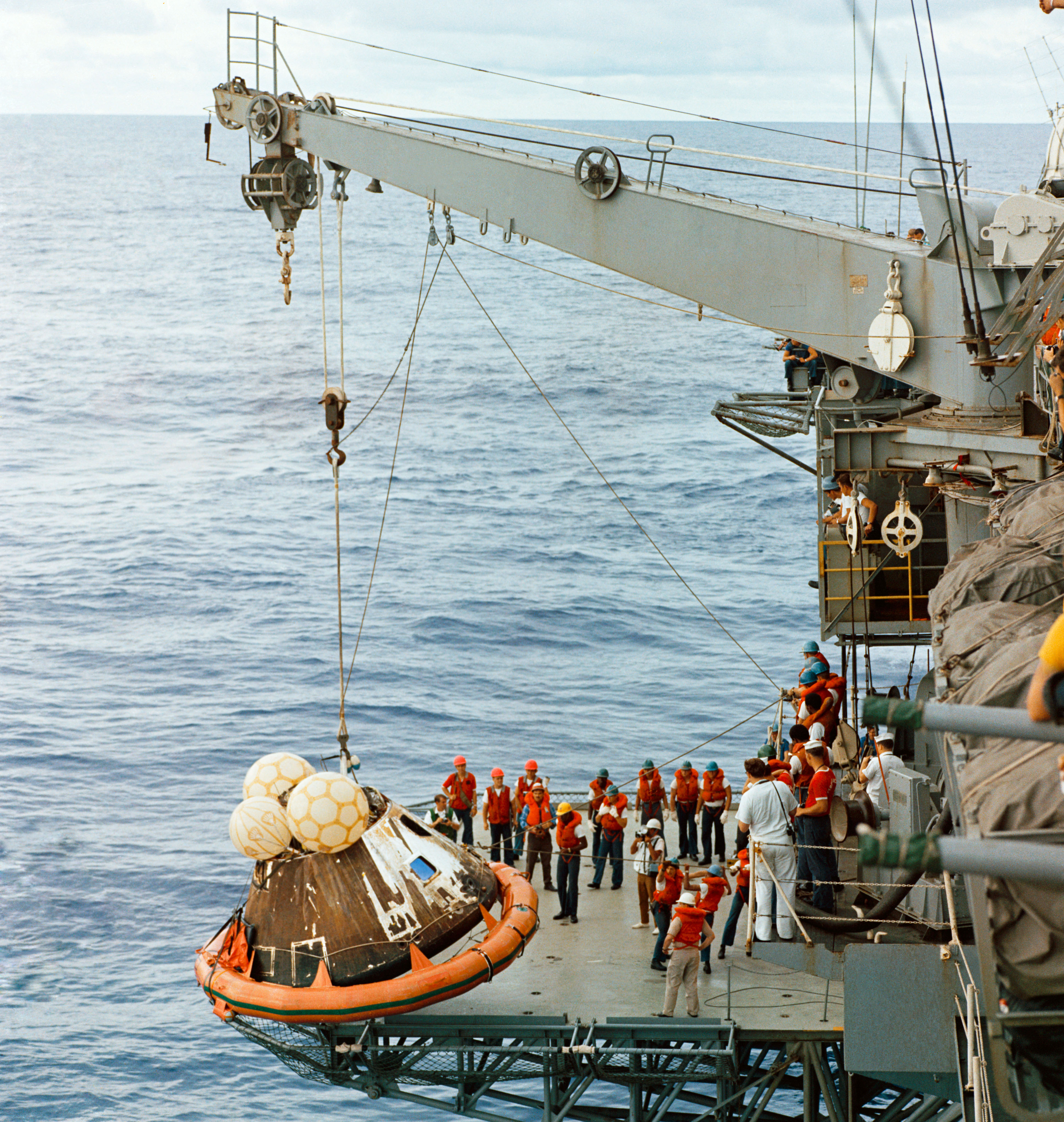
Apollo 13 command module Odyssey being recovered on to USS Iwo Jima

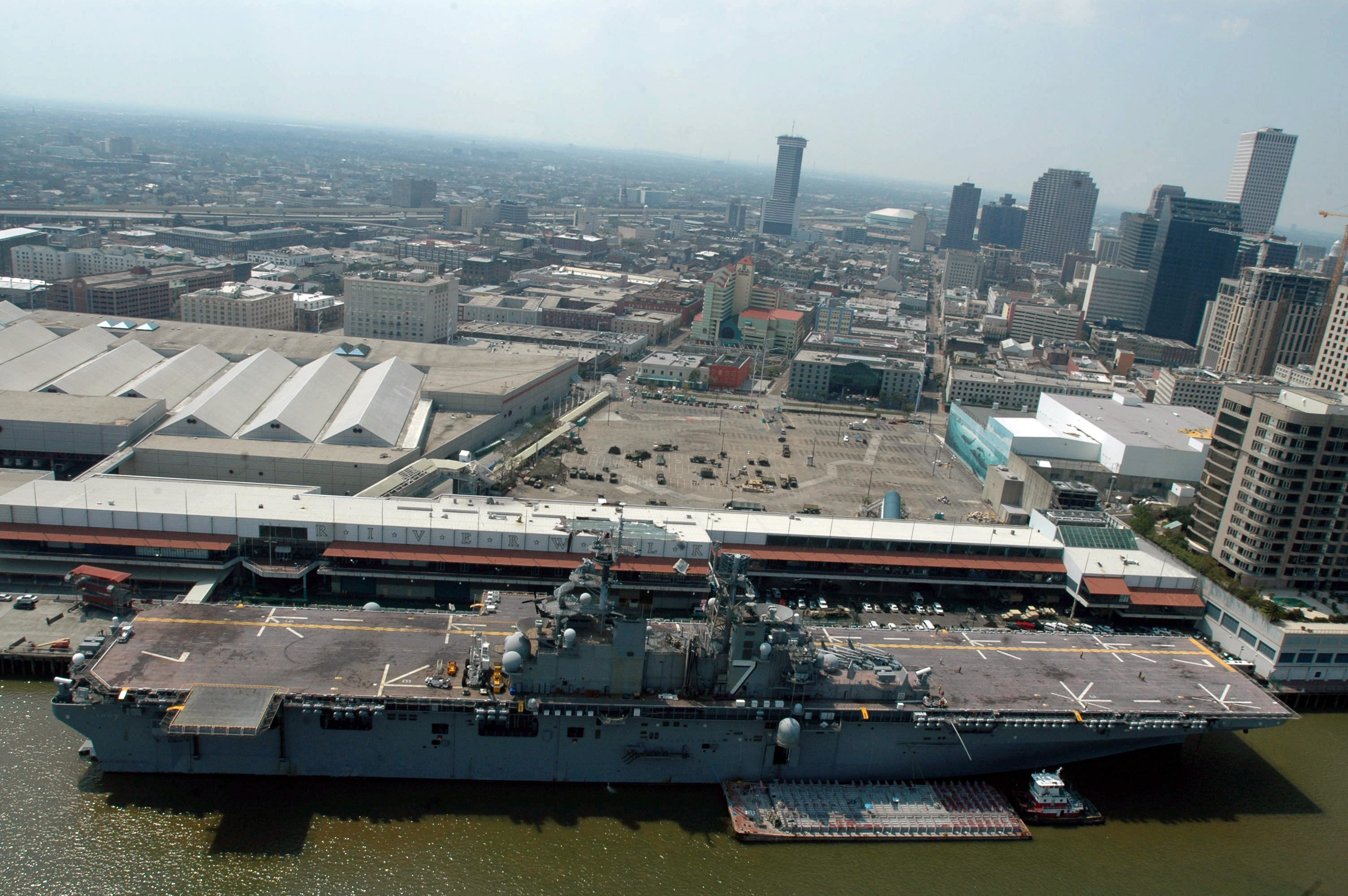
USS Iwo Jima in New Orleans providing disaster relief after Hurricane Katrina in 2005

The preliminary ideas for joint support ships arose from the development of "helicopter carriers", classes of vessels such as landing platform docks (LPDs) and landing helicopter docks (LHDs) designed for the operation of rotary-wing and other types of vertical take-off and landing (VTOL) aircraft. Unlike conventional fixed-wing aircraft carriers, these vessels do not require steam catapults for the launching of aircraft or arresting cables for the recovery or aircraft, and thus provided more space below the flight deck which could be utilised for other purposes. Some early LHDs were converted World War II-era aircraft carriers such as the United States Navy (USN)'s Essex-class vessels, but later designs often featured non-full length flight decks, usually at rear of the vessel.

While initial emphasis was placed upon airborne operations, as the need for combined forces capabilities grew, facilitating amphibious operations also became a requirement, and later designs such as the Royal Navy (RN)'s Fearless-class LPD emerged featuring a well dock to launch and recover personnel, vehicular and utility landing craft, and in the case of the USN's Austin-class LPD, Tarawa-class landing helicopter assault (LHA) and other similar classes of vessels, tracked amphibious landing vehicles such as the AAVP-7A1.

To support the air- and sea-going craft these vessels carried, they often featured fuel bunkers with increased storage capacity, and were often utilised as supplementary auxiliary ships to provide underway replenishment (UNREPs) to other vessels. Their absence of large calibre weapons on weather decks and with increased storage space below, they also proved very useful at sealift operations. Many also had onboard hospital facilities and the vessels served as casualty evacuation vessels. These multiple roles were demonstrated in 1956 during the Suez Crisis, where the helicopters of HMS Ocean (R68), a former World War II aircraft carrier repurposed to a helicopter carrier, were not only used to transport Royal Marines to the shore but supplies and other cargo as well, and return with wounded troops. With a combination of army (or marine) and navy personnel and aircrew onboard, and often equipped with a wide range of sensor suites, these vessels were utilised as ad-hoc or formal joint command and control centres, as demonstrated during the Vietnam War, the Falklands War and the Gulf War.

With their multi-role capabilities, these vessels have also proven extremely useful in civil emergencies, providing humanitarian aid and disaster relief at times of natural disasters, and for peace-keeping duties providing logistical support for internally displaced persons (IDPs), and this capability is often factored into tender requirements during procurement processes (and which can be helpful at justifying the need for these vessels to politicians).

Examples of vessels of other classes that have undertaken multiple roles for which a JSS is intended to fulfil include:

- In 1988, HMS Ocean (L12), an LPH of the RN, provided humanitarian aid to victims of Hurricane Mitch in Honduras and Nicaragua. In 2012 the vessel was moored on the River Thames at Greenwich to providing logistics support, accommodation and a secure helicopter landing site for the London Olympic Games.
- From December 2001 to March 2002 HMAS Kanimbla, a landing platform amphibious (LPA) ship of the Royal Australian Navy (RAN), deployed to the Persian Gulf and conducted boarding parties to inspect ships transiting the waters for compliance with sanctions against Iraq, and served as the forward operating base (FOB) for US Navy SEAL teams. In 2003 the vessel returned to the Gulf where it operated as a command and control ship during the invasion of Iraq, as well as providing logistical support to other coalition vessels in the conflict. The ship has also provided disaster relief and humanitarian aid in South East Asia and the Oceania region, including the 2004 Boxing Day Tsunami.
- In 2020 INS Jalashwa, a LPD of the Indian Navy was used to retrieve Indian nationals stranded in the Maldives during the COVID-19 pandemic.
- Various vessels of the USN's Iwo Jima-class landing platform helicopter (LPH) ships have been used for purposes other than amphibious and airborne landings, including:
  - In 1962 USS Iwo Jima operated as a control ship during the Operation Fishbowl nuclear tests at Johnston Atoll and evacuated and later return non-essential personnel to and from the site
  - between 1963 and 1971 numerous vessels of this class operated off the coast of Vietnam where their duties included mine countermeasures, search and rescue operations, underway refuelling of other task force ships, and with their 100-bed hospitals were often the primary receiving station for wounded personnel
  - Between 1970 and 1972 five vessels of this class functioned as recovery ships for NASA's Apollo crewed lunar program, including Iwo Jima which recovered the crew and capsule of Apollo 13
  - From 1972 to 1974 USS Guam was used as an experimental sea control ship
  - In 1983 Guam acted as a command and control and logistic support ship for the Multinational Force in Lebanon and in October, survivors of the Beirut barracks bombing where airlifted to Iwo Jima, which acted as a hospital ship.
- Vessels of USN's Wasp-class LHDs have conducted and coordinated disaster response operations for various natural disasters, including Hurricane Katrina.

As a result of the multi-role nature of these operations, a new type of vessel emerged, the joint support ship, as a hybrid of two very different classes of vessels, amphibious assault ships and auxiliary ships.

== Design features ==
While the specific roles that a JSS is designed to fulfil varies between navies (e.g. the Canadian Protecteur class features a reinforced hull for Arctic operations), most vessels share common features to support the basic roles they provide for both navies and armies. Below are some examples of these common features:

- Flight deck and hangars for helicopters or other VTOL aircraft (e.g. V-22 Osprey) for airlift operations and aircraft maintenance. Typically, a JSS would not feature a full-length flight deck like that of a helicopter carrier and some classes of LHDs.
- Well dock for transporting, launching and recovering amphibious, landing or other sea-to-shore craft (e.g. LCACs, LCUs, RHIBs, etc.)
- Sealift space for transport and transfer of heavy equipment
- Berthing space and ordnance lockers for military personnel and their equipment
- Fuel storage tanks and dry storage for ammunition, food, and other supplies for replenishing other ships while underway.
- Seabasing command rooms for mission coordination
- Lifting equipment for the loading and unloading of deck cargo, or the launching and recovery of small watercraft
- Greater emphasis upon self-defence weapon systems than dedicated auxiliary ships, making them better suited for operating in combat zones
- Other support facilities e.g. hospital rooms.

Furthermore, to fulfil its missions a flexible modular design allows for configuration of temporary areas for different purposes as missions require. As such it is basically a combination of an amphibious warfare ship and auxiliary ships like replenishment oiler, transport ship, and hospital ship in one.

== Vessels in service ==
=== Royal Canadian Navy ===
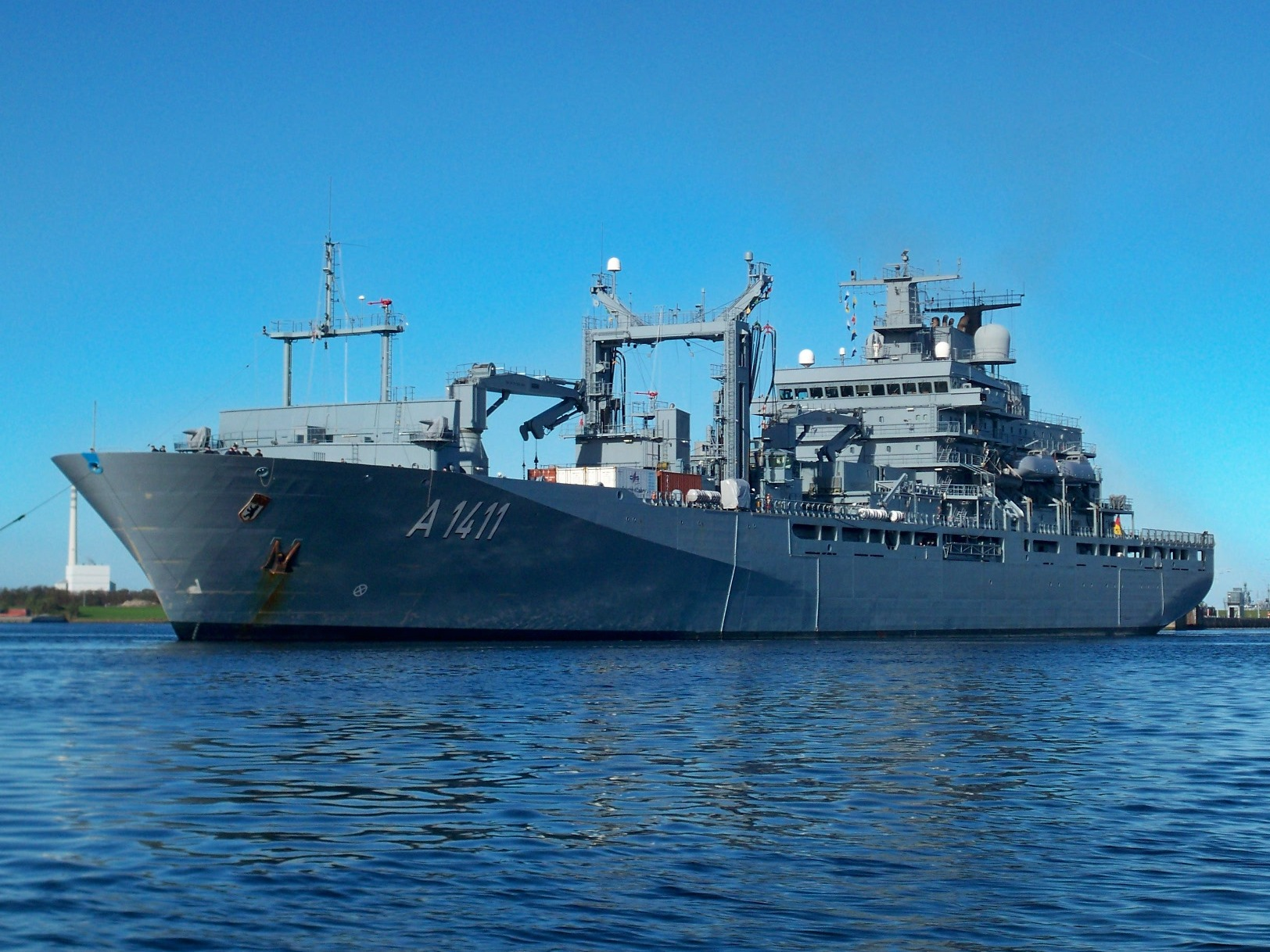
Berlin-class replenishment ship, basis for the Canadian JSS

In 1999 the Canadian government sought to replace the Royal Canadian Navy's ageing Protecteur class of auxiliary oiler replenishment (AOR) ships through the Afloat Logistic Support Capability (ALSC) program. The replacement program envisioned tanker ships with roll-on/roll-off (RORO) sealift capability. These multi-role ships were envisioned to deploy mobilised forces directly to the beach.

In 2004, Public Works and Government Services Canada (PWGSC) issued a request for proposal (RFP) for the joint support ship (JSS) to replace three AOR ships, although one AOR ship was already retired by the time the RFP was released. The RFP capped the bid price at C$1.5 billion (most reports state the cost was C$2.1bn, however C$600 million was reserved for the government's own project costs, and was not included in the RFP bid ceiling price). The RFP called for three multi-role ships capable of refuelling ships at sea, providing ship-borne helicopter support, heavy sealift capability, a mobile hospital, a joint force headquarters centre, and a strengthened hull for operations in sea ice.

PWGSC cancelled the program in 2008 after stating all the received bids were above the mandatory budget. The Canadian government restarted the JSS procurement process in the same year.

In 2013 Canada selected the Berlin-class replenishment ship design to replace the Protecteur-class fleet. The German design provides fuel, provisions, ammunition, and some materiel and medical capabilities, and can land up to two helicopters. The ships are to be built in Vancouver by Seaspan Shipyards under the National Ship Procurement Strategy (NSPS).

Originally to be designated as the Queenston class with ship names of HMCS Queenston and HMCS Châteauguay (named after battle sites from the War of 1812), in 2017 the Royal Canadian Navy renamed the joint support ships to the former Protecteur-class designation, re-using the same ship names HMCS Protecteur and HMCS Preserver.

The cost of building the two replenishment ships was set at C$2.3bn with first delivery occurring in 2018. In 2018, the government's own review indicated the total cost was then calculated to be C$3.4bn, with first delivery not likely before 2022 or 2023. As of 2019, delivery of the first vessel was expected to occur in 2023 followed by the second vessel in 2025. Those dates were each reported in 2022 to have slipped by a further two years.

=== Royal Netherlands Navy ===
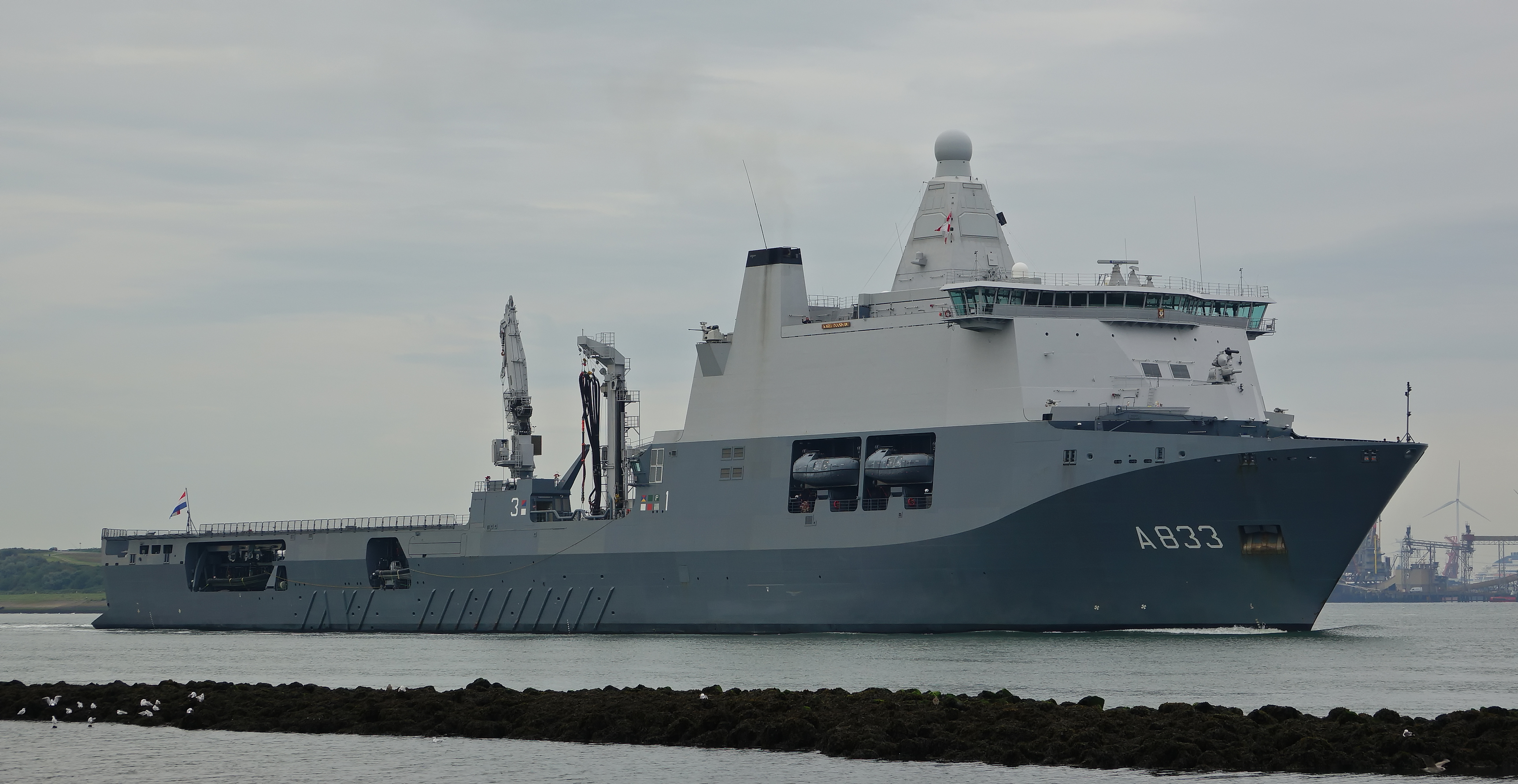
HNLMS Karel Doorman

The Royal Netherlands Navy operates a single JSS, HNLMS Karel Doorman, which officially entered service in 2015 and replaced both of that force's existing replenishment oilers, HNLMS Zuiderkruis and HNLMS Amsterdam.

The vessel was constructed by the Damen Group, at their shipyard in Galați, Romania, although installation of weapon systems and final fit-out was undertaken in Vlissingen, the Netherlands. The vessel has the following design features:

- forward superstructure containing bridge and operating stations, crew and troop accommodation, medical bay, helicopter hangar, etc.
- rear weather and helicopter decks, with hangar and landing space for six and two CH-47F Chinook-sized helicopters respectively
- port and starboard amidship underway replenishment stations
- 100 t (220,000 lb) capacity RoRo quarter ramp
- 40-ton deck crane and a steel beach stern ramp for cargo transfer to/from landing craft, with stowage for two Landing craft vehicle personnel (LCVP) and two rigid-hull inflatable boats (RHIB) launched and recovered by davits.
- sealift capacity of 2,350 m^{2} (25,295 sq ft) with 1,000 m^{2} (10,764 sq ft) of general cargo space and 730 m^{2} (7,858 sq ft) for ammunition storage
- bunker capacities of 7.7 million litres (2 million US gallons) of fuel, 1 million litres (264 thousand US gallons) of aviation fuel, and 400 thousand litres (106 thousand US gallons) of freshwater.

In November 2014, despite the fact the vessel had only recently completed sea trials but not yet commissioned, it was sent on a three-month deployment to West Africa as part of the European Union's response to an Ebola outbreak, where it delivered ambulances, portable hospitals and medical supplies to Guinea, Liberia and Sierra Leone.

In 2016 the Dutch and German Ministers of Defence agreed that HNLMS Karel Doorman would be shared by both the Royal Netherlands Navy and the German Navy.

== Planned vessels ==
=== Royal Australian Navy ===
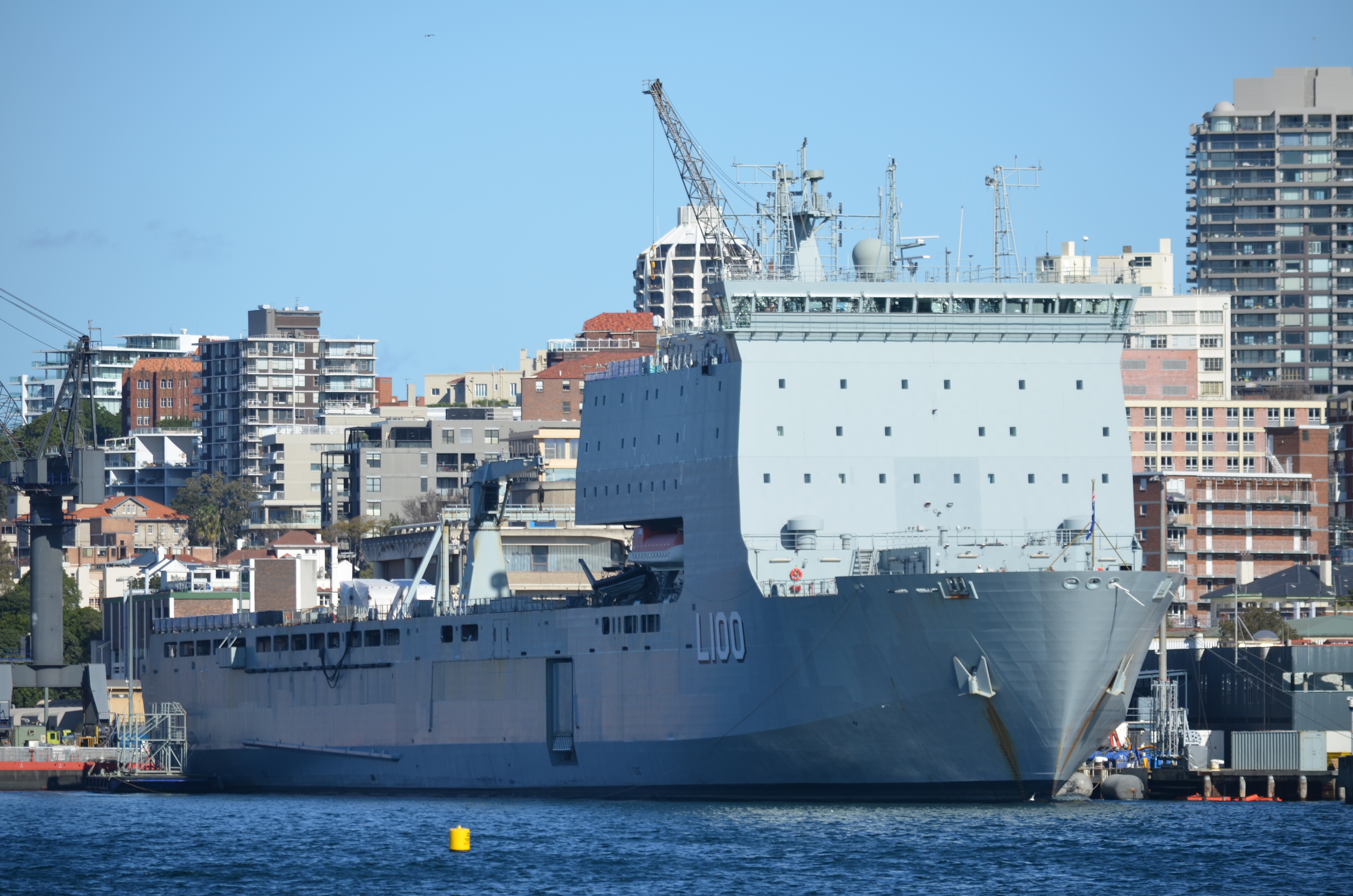
HMAS Choules, due to be replaced by joint supply ships

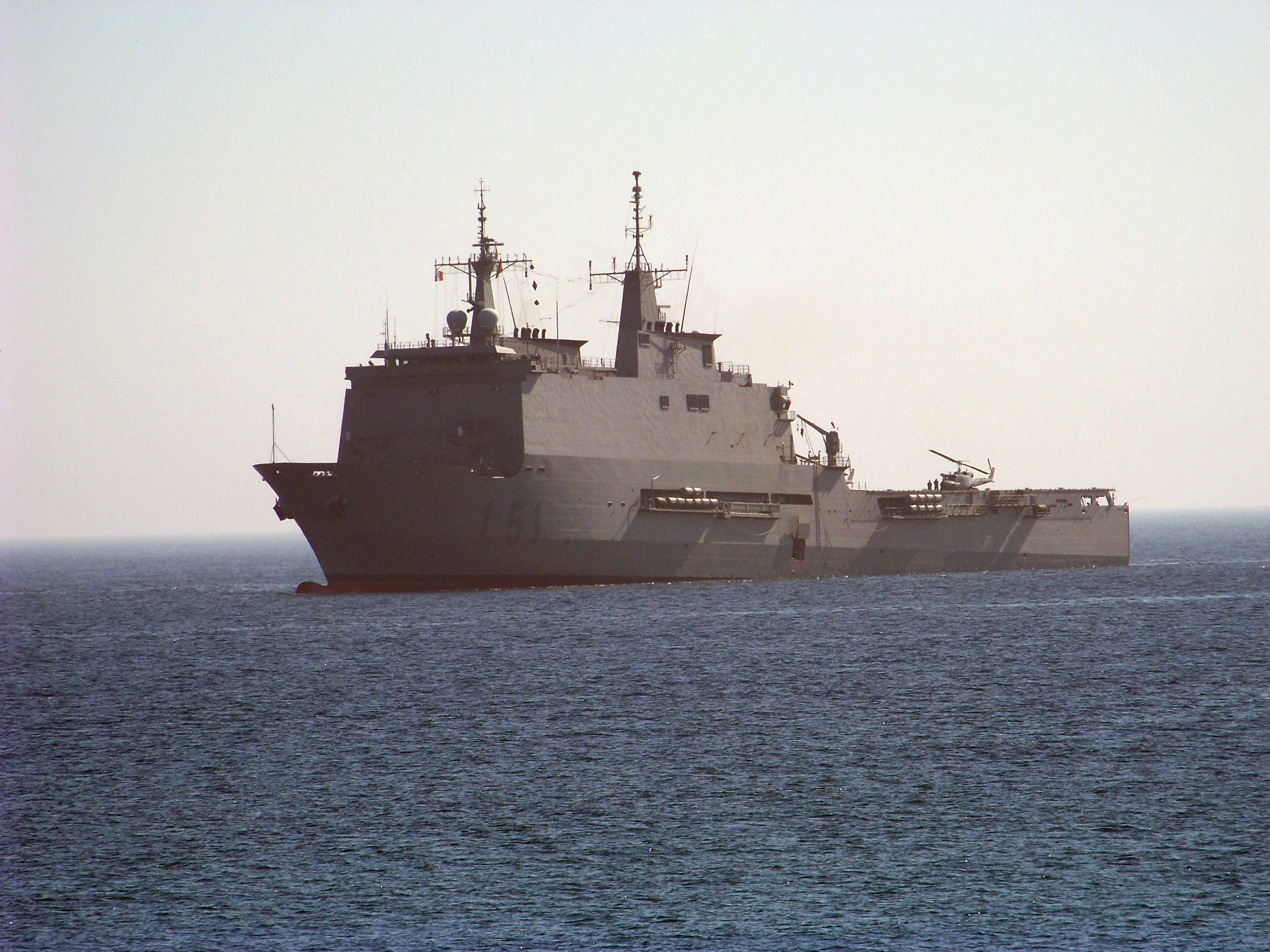
Galicia-class LHD, upon which Navantia's JSS is based

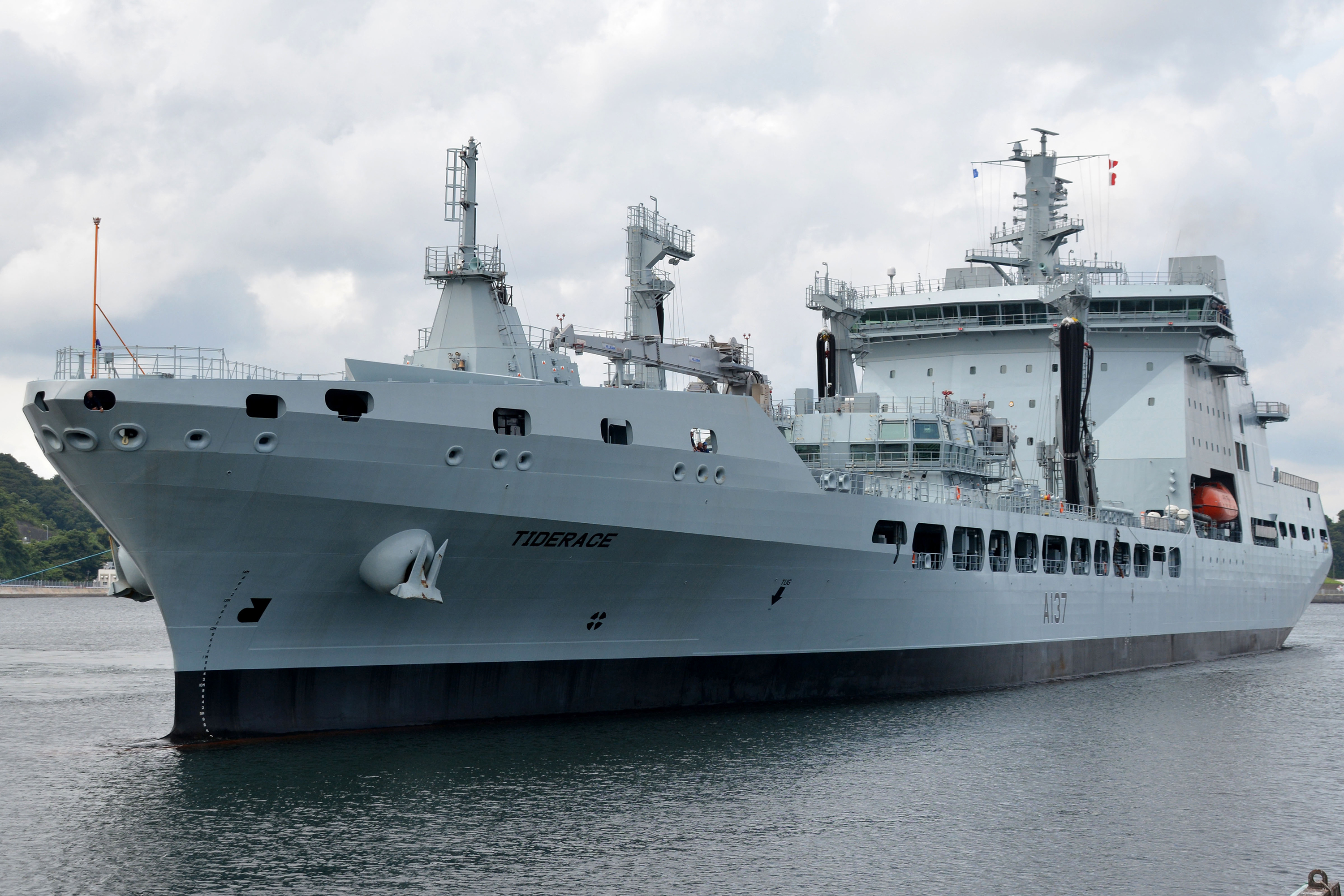
Tide-class tanker, upon which BMT's JSS is based

In July 2020 the Australian government published its 2020 Force Structure Plan and 2020 Defence Strategic Update announcing its intention to procure two locally-built two multi-purpose auxiliary vessels able to perform both sealift and replenishment operations under project SEA2200, to replace the Royal Australian Navy's current landing ship dock (LSD) HMAS Choules. The new class of JSS vessels would also supplement the RAN's two Canberra-class LHDs which entered service commencing in 2015 to increase its combined forces projection capabilities in the region.

In anticipation of the forthcoming requirement, at the PACIFIC 2019 naval defence exposition in October 2019, Navantia, the company which produced a large number of the RAN's new vessels including the Supply-class replenishment oilers (AORs), displayed a design for a JSS. The new ship, based upon the company's Galicia-class LPD, features a forward superstructure, large rear helicopter deck and rear well dock, and is said to combine 70% of the load capacity of HMAS Choules and 70% of the fuel capacity of HMAS Success, the AOR decommissioned that year. Specific features include:

- capacity for 300 troops and up to 500 tonnes (1.1 million pounds) of vehicles
- capacity for 3,600 tonnes (7.9 million pounds) of marine diesel, 600 tonnes (1.3 million pounds) of aviation fuel and 400 tonnes (0.9 million pounds) of fresh water
- flight deck and hangar to accommodate two MRH90 Taipan or SH-60 Seahawk helicopters
- well dock to transport, launch and recover two LHD landing craft (LLCs)
- medical and dental facilities including X-ray machines, operating rooms and intensive care ward.

In May 2022 the BMT Group, the company that upgraded HMAS Choules when it was acquired from the Royal Navy, displayed their Ellida design at INDO PACIFIC 2022. This vessel is based on the same family of auxiliary craft as the Tide-class tankers operated by the Royal Fleet Auxiliary and features a large roll-on/roll-off (RoRo) cargo deck as well as stowage for large quantities of provisions and equipment to conduct underway replenishment.

The Damen Group, the company that constructed the JSS for the Royal Netherlands Navy, is also expected to submit their design.

In May 2021, Navantia's Australian subsidiary announced plans to expand its manufacturing capability in Western Australia, and if successful in winning the contract for the RAN's JSS, market this vessel to overseas customers.

=== Royal New Zealand Navy ===
It was reported in May 2021 that the Royal New Zealand Navy is a potential customer for further units of joint supply ships to be constructed in Australia.

== Cancelled vessels ==
=== German Navy ===
In the mid-1990s, after the end of the Cold War and the resultant change in both the European and global security situation, as well as the reunification with East Germany, Germany's armed forces underwent strategic transformation. Prior to this, the focus of the Bundeswehr was on national defence, but with conflicts in the Balkans, the Gulf War and Somalia which saw multi-national responses, the focus of country's armed forces shifted towards fulfilling Germany's obligations as a member of the international community. There was also an emphasis by NATO of preemptive intervention in "hotspots" around the globe, which required an increase in air and sea uplift capacity so as to deploy reaction forces. Specifically, the German navy was to have the capability to transport a small peacekeeping contingent with the vessel(s) also serving in the role of mission command and coordination. Furthermore, Somalia highlighted the need to provide humanitarian relief.

The German Navy (Deutsche Marine), the smallest branch of the country's armed forces, was ill-equipped for these new requirements, and commenced plans to commission a suitable vessel. This resulted in the Taktische Konzept Mehrzweckschiff project - the "Tactical Concept Multipurpose ship", and in late 1994 MTG Marinetechnik GmbH, the company established by the West German government in 1966 to design warships, responded with a conceptual design for a combined command, transport and hospital vessel that could be used by all branches of the Bundeswehr for global deployments. The cost of the vessel was estimated at 620 million Deutsch Mark (approximately US$395 million (Note: based on exchange rate as at 28 November 1994)). The proposed vessel would feature:

- length 196 m (643 ft 1 in)
- displacement 20,000 tonnes
- range 7,500 nautical miles (13,890 kilometres)
- RoRo capability
- space for 271 vehicles
- 8 helicopters
- 1 landing craft
- berthing space for 700 military personnel
- 70-bed hospital with 2 operating rooms

However, the high cost of the proposed vessel caused alarm among certain members of the Bundestag, the country's parliament, and in March 1995 the Chairman of the Defence Committee, Klaus Rose, argued against its acquisition and in May 1995 the Minister of Defence, Volker Rühe announced the project was to be stopped.

The navy persisted that the vessel was required and in 1998 the Weizsäcker-commission was formed, which advised the government of the need for a "transport and deployment support ship". This resulted in Einsatz Truppenunterstützungsschiff (Multi purpose Carrier) specifying an even larger ship with a displacement of 18,000 tonnes, possibly based upon Navantia's Galicia class. In 2003 this too was cancelled, apparently over concerns about the cost. Still the navy persisted and in 2007 announced that Joint Support Ships were to be included in their 2009 plan but by this stage they did not have the support of the army and the plan did not proceed.

In 2009 the Ministry of Defence published Flotte 2025 +, its plan for the future of the navy until 2025 which not only resurrected the proposed construction of two joint supply ships, but also included two Mehrzweckeinsatzschiffs, multipurpose dock ships that would be larger than a JSS. The plan was later updated to also include another multi-purpose ship, a Multi-role Helicopter Dock Expeditionary Support vessel of a modular design that could be reconfigured for various mission profiles and which would also be utilised for a future JSS class. In 2016 this plan was also cancelled due to concerns over its high cost.

As a cost-saving measure, in 2016 the German Minister of Defence signed an agreement with their Dutch counterpart to share the HNLMS Karel Doorman, the JSS under construction for Royal Netherlands Navy.

== Similar vessels ==
=== Indian Navy ===
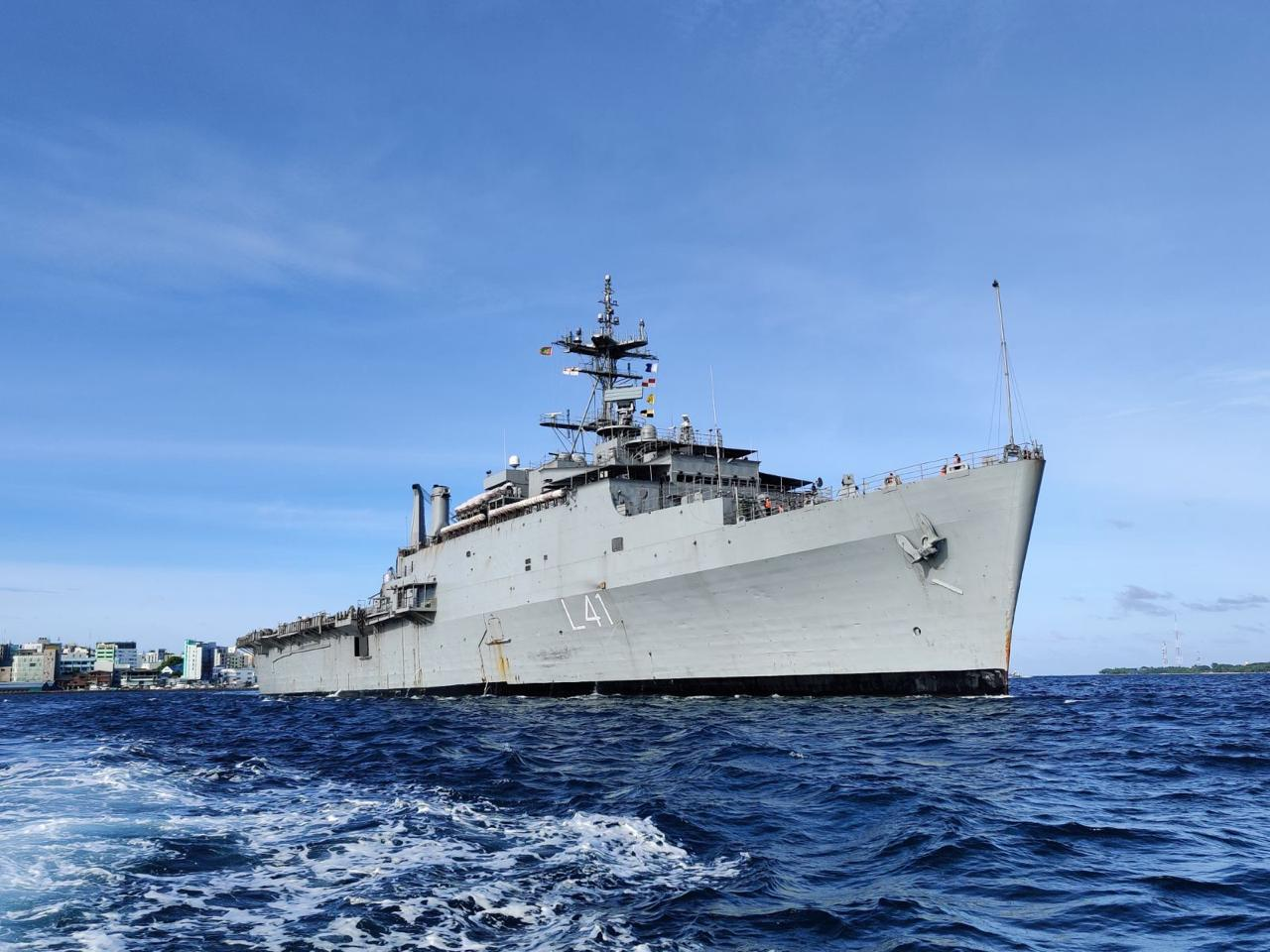
INS Jalashwa repatriated Indian nationals stranded in the Maldives due to the COVID-19 pandemic

In 2011 the Indian Navy (IN) published a Request For Information (RFI) for four multi-role support vessels (MRSV), similar in requirements and capabilities to a JSS, to supplement their existing LPD INS Jalashwa. This resulted in the publication in December 2013 of a Request For Proposal (RFP) for four more LPDs, rather than a new class of vessel, to be constructed. In November 2020 the scope of the RFP was reduced to two ships before the project was eventually cancelled before construction commenced.

In August 2021 the IN published a new RFI for four LHDs, with the first vessel expected to enter service no earlier than 2025. While these ships are technically LHDs they are a multi-role vessel that will undertake a similar range of duties as a JSS including:

- transport and land ashore a combined arms force
- stow onboard and discharge combat cargo required for undertaking and sustaining the operations ashore
- enable operation of multiple means of ship to shore movement of troops and cargo
- act as Command Centre for the Commander, Amphibious Task Force, Landing Force Commander and the Air Force Commander
- act as mother ship for unmanned vehicles/ platforms/ equipment
- provide medical facilities for treatment of battle casualties
- undertake humanitarian assistance and disaster relief missions.

=== Royal Malaysian Navy ===
In September 2021 the Malaysian Minister of Defence announced that his country's government would procure two a multi-role support ships (MRSS), vessels very similar in specification to a JSS, for the Royal Malaysian Navy (RMN). The vessels would enhance the RMN's strategic sealift capabilities between Peninsular Malaysia and the East Malaysian states of Sabah and Sarawak on the island of Borneo.

The nature of the MRSS requirements leads towards a smaller version of existing amphibious assault vessels currently available from multiple international shipbuilders, including the French Mistral-class and the Chinese Type 075 landing helicopter docks (LHDs), and Dutch Enforcer-class and Indonesian Makassar-class landing platform docks (LPDs). Navantia Australia proposed that their design for the RAN's JSS could fulfil this role, but the proposed vessel was not included in the list of designs being considered.

The procurement of these vessels is expected to commence in 2024.

=== United States Navy ===
The USN operates the world's largest fleet of amphibious assault vessels (AAV) with a number of different classes of ships of various sizes and capabilities that can fulfil a wide range of roles. Of particular relevance to the subject of joint supply ships are the Blue Ridge-class amphibious command ship (ACS) and the San Antonio-class LPD.

==== Blue Ridge-class ACS ====
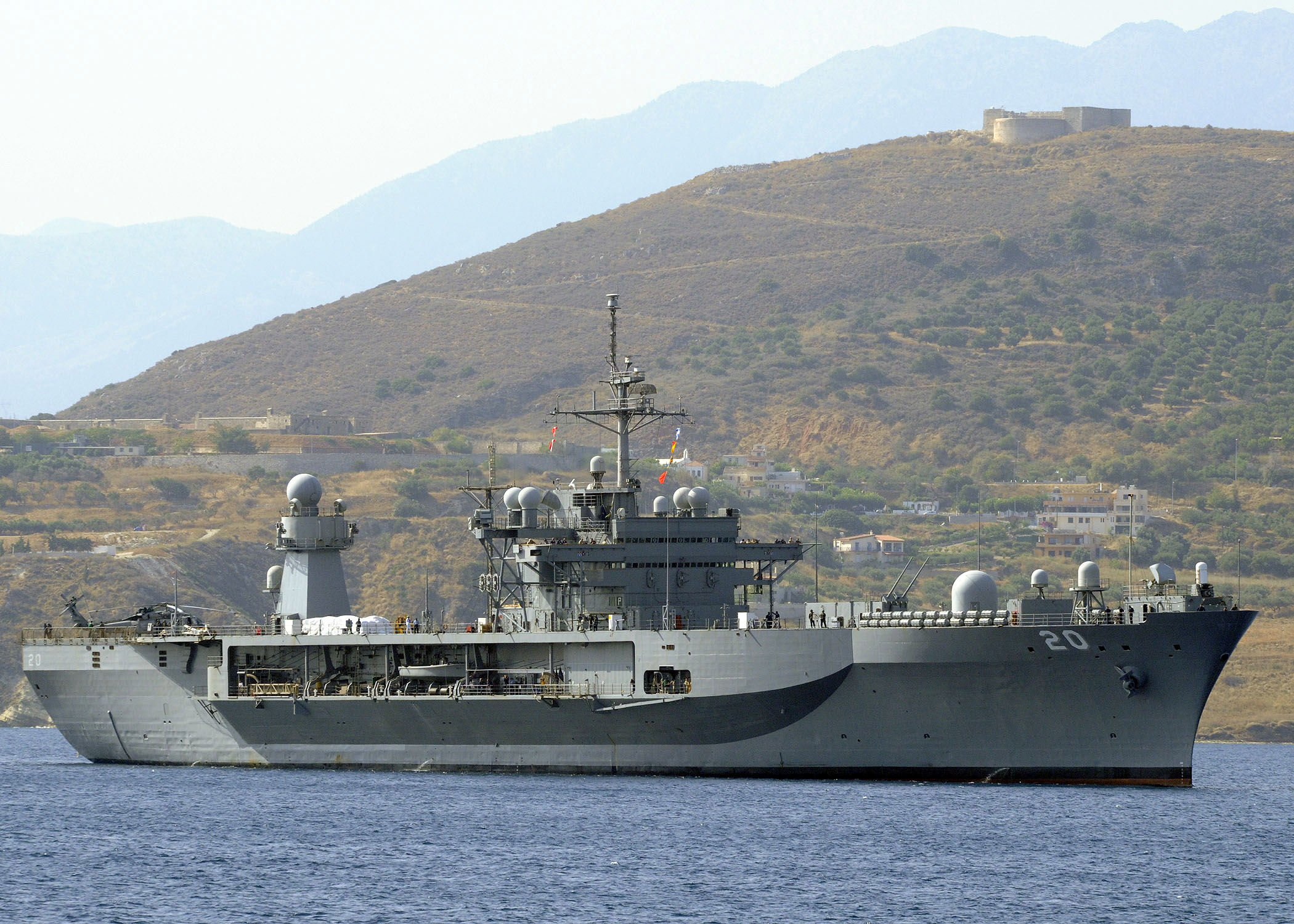
USS Mount Whitney, one of two Blue Ridge-class command ships

The Blue Ridge-class ACS are the USN's and worlds's first and only amphibious command ship, brought about due to previous command ships having insufficient speed to keep up with a 20-knot (37 km/h; 23 mph) amphibious force. They are based upon the Iwo Jima-class landing platform helicopter (LPH) ships, the USN's first class of dedicated helicopter carriers which began entering service in 1961. The basic design was modified to incorporate a bridge and operations superstructure located amidship along with a rear helicopter deck and communication and sensor masts located on the forward weather deck in place of the base vessels' island bridge and full-length flight deck. There are only two vessels in the class, USS Blue Ridge and USS Mount Whitney, and are the command vessels for the 7th and 6th Fleets respectively.

While these vessels have greater command and control capabilities than the class upon which they are based, they are limited by the fact that they lack a well dock and are thus deficient in terms of amphibious operations compared to other classes of AAVs in the USN. They are also limited in size of the rotorcraft they can operate, with the biggest being the CH-47 Chinook, and are not able to operate the CH-53 Sea Stallion nor the MV-22 Osprey. Therefore, away from shore-based facilities, their air- and sea-lift capabilities are limited to the helicopters that they can support.

They are the oldest commissioned vessels in the USN's fleet, with both vessels undergoing a major modernisation program in 2011 to extend their service lives for at least another 20 years, and Blue Ridge a US$60M propulsion plant overhaul in 2018. However, question marks exist surrounding their remaining scheduled operating lifespan, with the navy facing budget cutbacks and placing a greater emphasis on common capital infrastructure (i.e. weapons systems, power plants, etc.) to reduce cost, and with congressional pressure to reduce the size of its amphibious fleet, with just two class members and little commonality with other classes, they may be candidates for early retirement.

==== San Antonio-class LPD ====
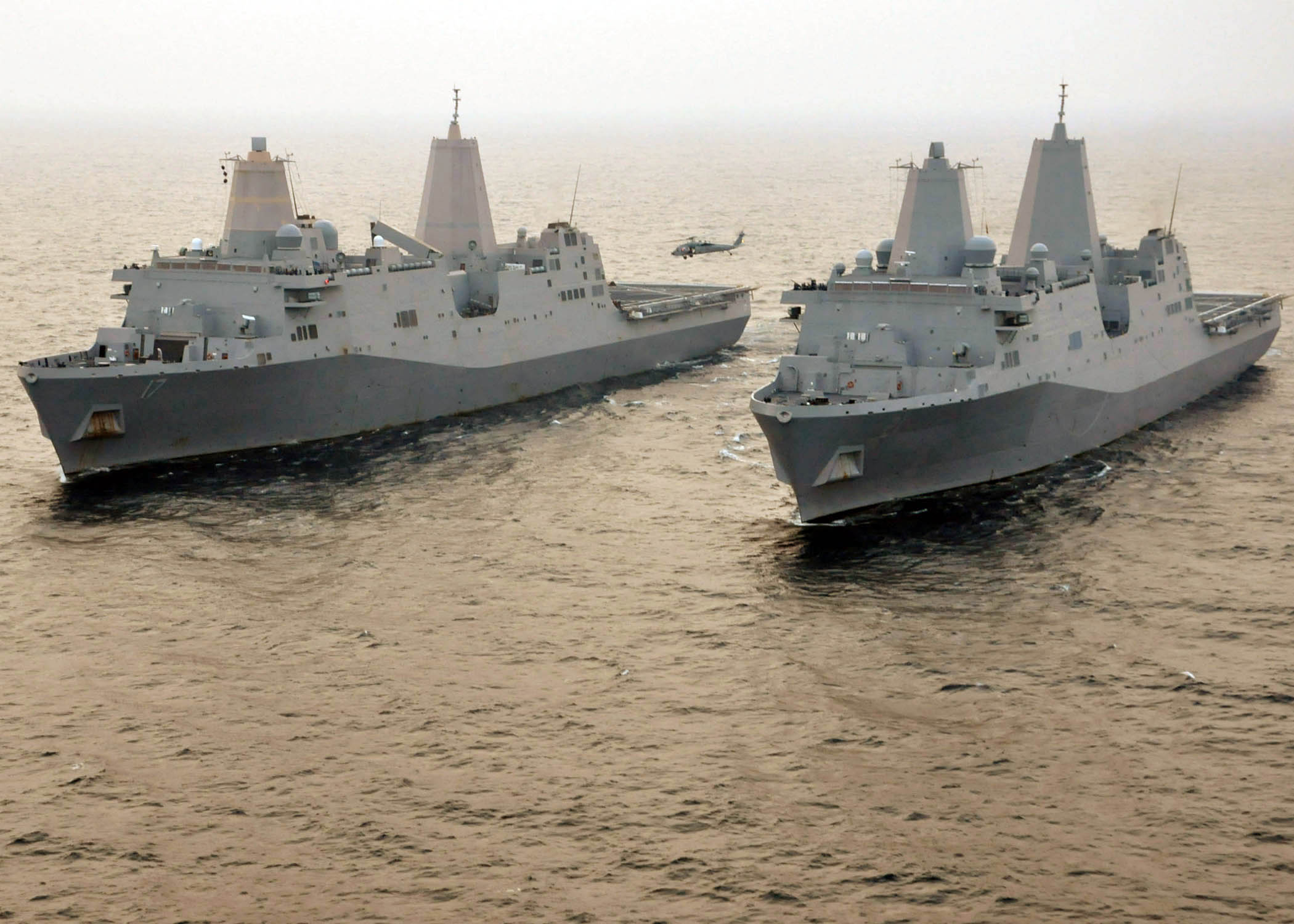
San Antonio-class LPDs

The San Antonio-class LPD is the USN's most numerous AAV with 12 ships currently in service (Note: the twelfth and final ship of 'Flight I' (i.e. first production order/version) of the San Antonio class, USS Fort Lauderdale, was commissioned into service on 30 July 2022, six months after the homepage for this class of vessel on the USN's website was last updated) as of December 2022 and with three further vessels under construction and another on order.

The class is marketed by its builders, Ingalls Shipbuilding, as a multi-role vessel, and was described by a former Chief of Naval Operations (CNO) as "modular trucks" in reference to its versatility and sealift capacity, who proposed the fitting of modular mission bays as utilised by the navy's littoral combat ships to increase its capabilities. Compared to earlier AAVs such as the Austin class it replaced, this class features larger and more capable sensor suites making it an ideal command and control platform, and unusual for this class of vessel (and more akin to an air warfare destroyer (AWD) features two large sensor masts. In fact, it has been proposed that the Aegis Ballistic Missile Defense System (Aegis BDM), as fitted to the Arleigh Burke-class AWDs, be fitted to this ships within class to further increase their multi-mission capabilities.

In recent years the USN has put greater emphasis upon the use of unmanned aerial vehicles (UAV) and unmanned combat aerial vehicles (UCAV), and the San Antonio class makes an excellent candidate as an operations platform, and since 2013 the RQ-21 Blackjack, launched from a portable catapult, has been operated from several ships in this class including USS San Antonio and USS Mesa Verde. In early 2021, USS Portland was involved in trials with Martin UAV (Note: a subsidiary of Shield AI, an aerospace and defence technology company in Texas, rather than part of the Lockheed Martin Corporation) for its V-Bat VTOL UAV.

==== Future vessels ====
There are a number of issues facing the USN's capabilities for amphibious warfare, sealift and multi-mission operations:

1. Decrease in funding: budget cuts are expected in financial years 2024 and 2025 that will be result in the navy facing a "blackhole" in that they will not have sufficient funding to fulfil their proposed 5-year construction plan due to commence in 2025.
2. Reduction in sealift capacity: In October 2022, the US Navy failed to meet its readiness goal for amphibious ships of 80%, with only 45% of the fleet available. Furthermore, the navy and the Marine Corps have differing views upon the navy's sealift capacity; while there are currently 32 vessels in the amphibious fleet the USMC is pushing for 38 vessels while the USN is looking to operate only 24-28 vessels to meet budget constraints. Current and future capacity is being reduced by, or under threat of reduction by, the following changes:
  - The ageing Whidbey Island-class landing ship dock (LSD) have been in service since 1985. Unlike an LPD, a these vessels do not have a helicopter hangar, only a flight deck, thus limiting their versatility. Two vessels were decommissioned 2021–2022 and the navy wants to decommission the remaining six vessels by 2024.
  - The Harpers Ferry-class LSD are modified versions of the Whidbey Island class, whereby landing craft capacity was sacrificed for more cargo space. The Navy wants to decommission the four vessels of this class commencing 2024.
  - Of the 13 planned Flight II (a more affordable upgrade of the original design) San Antonio-class LPD, of which four are currently under production or on order and another one planned, the Navy wants to cancel the remaining eight ships. This would reduce the planned number in the class from 26 to 18 vessels.
3. Increase command & control and information gathering & sharing capabilities: Among the navy's priorities is increasing the command and control capabilities of its amphibious assault fleet to take advantage of the increased amount of data the F-35 Lightning Joint Strike Fighter, operated by the Navy and the Marine Corps (Note: the United States Marine Corps operates the F-35B short takeoff and vertical landing (STOVL) variant while the United States Navy operates the F-35C catapult-assisted take-off but arrested recovery (CATOBAR) variant), can gather. However, while this aircraft's systems can interface with those of the Blue Ridge-class ACS and San Antonio-class LPDs, it cannot with the Wasp class, and with seven vessels of this class currently in service, is the second largest class of amphibious ship in the USN behind the San Antonio class. However, any plan to upgrade these vessels, is, as of December 2022, currently unfunded.
4. Viability of the LCS program: the USN operates two classes of littoral combat ships (LCS), the Freedom class and the Independence class, which with their extensive list of problems (Note: Vessels of the Independence-class LCS have suffered premature hull cracks and corrosion while those of the Freedom class have suffered electrical and powerplant problems. Both classes have been rated as unable to defend themselves in the (solo) close-shore missions for which they were designed, and have less martial capability than the Oliver Hazard Perry-class frigates they replaced. Of the 35 ships originally planned, as of February 2022, 25 have been commissioned and 10 are in various stages of construction (which was originally due to be completed by 2019). Of the commissioned vessels and despite the fact the first only entered service in 2008, one Freedom and two Independence ships have already been decommissioned (over 10 years short of their planned service life) and another nine more Independence ships facing a similar fate in 2023 (but currently but delayed), with the possibility of at least 12 if not all remaining vessels being withdrawn from service by 2031, despite the newest being less than ten years old at that date.) are considered by many in Congress and the Department of Defense to be expensive failures and should be prematurely retired from service. While these vessels cannot fulfil all the roles of a JSS, they were supposed to be the navy's premier multi-mission vessels, and if they are removed from service would create a gap in certain capabilities for the Navy.
5. Next-Generation Logistics Ship (NGLS) Program: NGLS is quite an important project for the USN as not only will it responsible for the Navy's next auxiliary ships but it marks a fundamental shift in the recent design philosophy that "bigger is better" (Note: Evident in the Virginia class of fast-attack submarines, for example, the latest of which have a submerged displacement around 48% more than the Los Angeles class they are scheduled to replace.), which has seen most other classes of ships grow in size. The USN's emerging doctrine of anti-access/area-denial (A2/AD) aims to create a "no-go zone" for an opposing force in times of conflict built upon more distributed fleets with a reduced proportion of larger ships and an increased proportion of smaller ships, thus lessening the risk posed by concentrated attacks on a relatively small number of large, high-value targets. Vessels in the NGLS program will be part of that objective.
  Currently, the USN is constructing the new John Lewis-class TAO (oilers), traditional large - and expensive - vessels at more than $700 million per ship, built at a rate of just one ship per year. The NGLS program would instead deliver a new class of smaller ships that would be less expensive and faster to construct yet meet the requirements for refuelling, rearming and resupply operations. However, these vessels, described as "medium-sized" ships, are not intended to replace but to supplement these new vessels and existing classes such as the Fast combat support ship, with an emphasis on operations in contested and littoral environments deemed too high a risk for larger vessels.
  The Navy's five-year shipbuilding plan for financial years 2023–FY2027 outlines the procurement of the first NGLS in 2026 at a cost of $150 million and the second in 2027 at $156 million, each around the fifth of the cost of a John Lewis-class vessel. It is not yet determined how many vessels will be constructed but the 30-year plan commencing 2023 proposes at least a dozen or so ships, and perhaps twice that number or more. It is envisaged that they will be a family of vessels built upon a common modular design, rather than single type. In December 2021 Austal USA was selected for the program's design study at a cost of $2 million.

In essence, these are the same problems that other countries that operate or are acquiring joint supply ships faced. Furthermore, it is also important to recognise the significance of the downsizing of the proposed NGLS vessels in respect to the USN's future plans. This all leads to the question of whether the USN could develop a JSS in the near future to satisfy its emerging needs. While there is no such vessel currently planned, the new NGLS could be considered as a JSS in all but name, although it remains to be seen until the design is finalised as to whether these ships will feature the amphibious operations capability of similar ships in other navies.

=== Royal Danish Navy ===
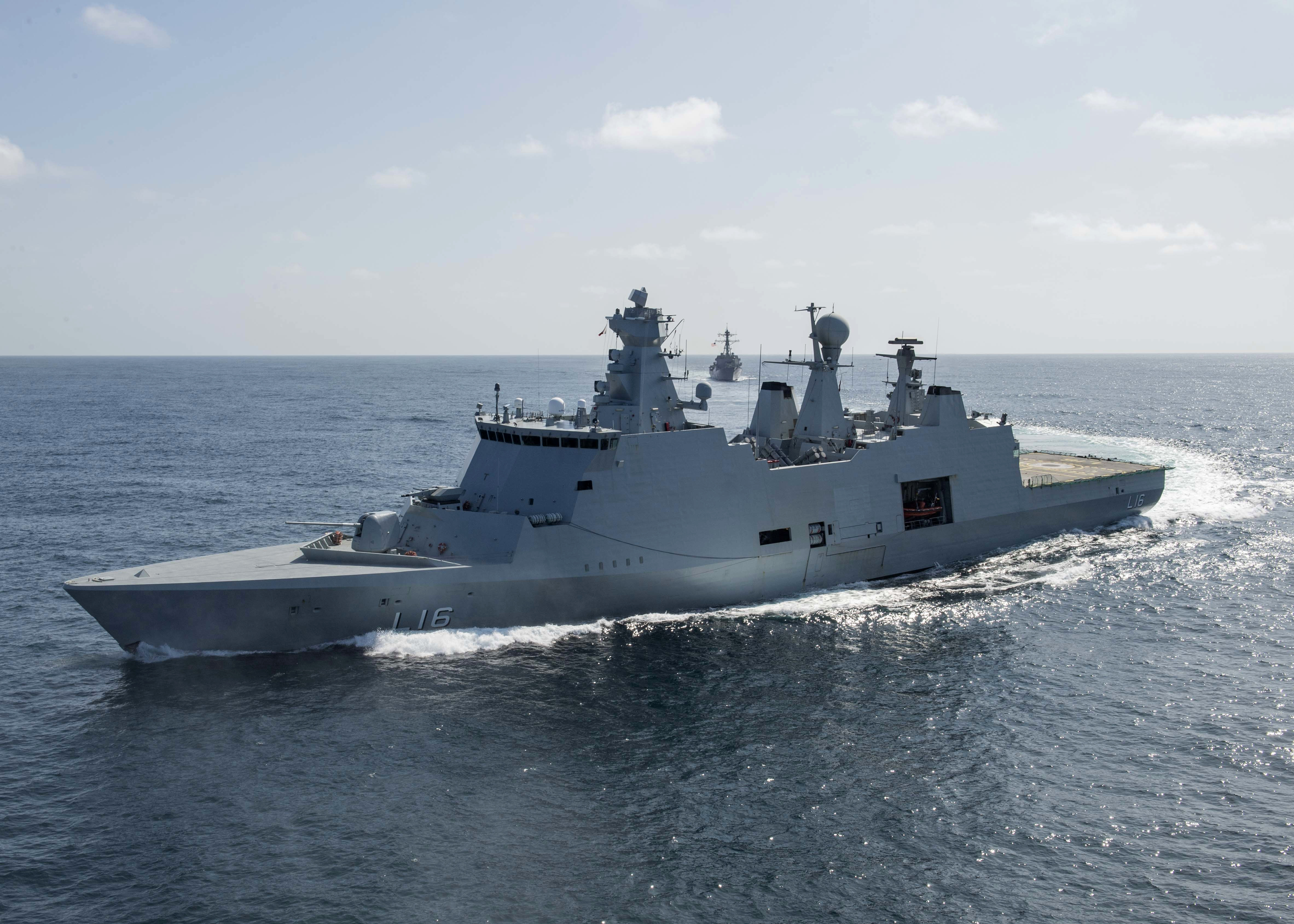
Absalon in 2019

Royal Danish Navy built two Absalon-class frigates in 2003–2005, which are a hybrid between a frigate and a support ship with multiple role capabilities, with the capacity to be transformed from a combat ship with the firepower of a traditional frigate to a hospital ship within a day. The class is based on a frigate-like design, but built with an internal multipurpose deck (flex deck) and a stern vehicle ramp. The ships can serve as command platforms for a staff of 75 persons (naval or joint staff) with a containerized command and control centre, transport and base of operations for a company-sized landing force of some 200 soldiers with vehicles. Alternatively, the flex deck can be used for mine-laying operations with a capacity of some 300 mines, or be fitted out for mine-clearing operations and launch and recover mine detecting and clearing equipment via a retractable gantry crane, adjacent to the stern vehicle ramp, which also is used for launching and recovering the fast landing craft. Furthermore, the flex deck can support a containerized hospital or simply transport a number of ISO standard containers or some 55 vehicles, including up to seven main battle tanks. The ships can carry two landing craft, personnel (LCPs) (Storebro SB90E), two rigid hull inflatable boats and two AW-101 helicopters. For political reasons, the ships were originally launched as "Flexible support ships" to avoid antagonising Russia after the end of the Cold War. On 16 October 2020, both ships were reclassed as anti-submarine warfare-frigates.

== See also ==
- Fast combat support ship
