= Joyoung =

Chinese manufacturer of electronic home appliances

Joyoung Co., Ltd.
- Type: Public Subsidiary
- Traded as: SZSE: 002242
- Industry: home appliances
- Founded: 1994; 32 years ago
- Headquarters: Jinan, Shandong, China
- Parent: JS Global (67.16%)
- Website: www.joyoung.com.cn

Joyoung Co., Ltd.
- Simplified Chinese: 九阳股份有限公司
- Traditional Chinese: 九陽股份有限公司
Transcriptions
Standard Mandarin
- Hanyu Pinyin: Jiǔyáng Gǔfènyǒuxiàngōngsī

Joyoung Co., Ltd. (simplified Chinese: 九阳; traditional Chinese: 九陽; pinyin: Jiǔyáng) is a Chinese manufacturer of home-use soybean milk machines, headquartered in Jinan, Shandong. The business was incorporated in 1994. As of 2009 it was China's largest soybean milk machine company. The company saw an increase in business after a tainted milk scandal in 2008. In May of that year it was listed on the Shenzhen Stock Exchange.

Soy milk is known as Chinese cuisine as well as one of the Chinese traditional breakfast drinks. Therefore, in the beginning, Joyoung Company mainly focused on soy-related appliances such as soy milk makers.
