= JS =

JS or js may refer to:

== Computing ==
- JavaScript, a high-level, just-in-time compiled, object-oriented programming language
- JScript, Microsoft's dialect of the ECMAScript standard used in Internet Explorer

== Businesses and organizations ==
- Jonge Socialisten, a Dutch political group
- Air Koryo, North Korea's state-run airline, IATA code JS
- Jahangir Siddiqui & Co., a Pakistani financial services company
- Jaffna Stallions, a team participating in Lanka Premier League
- United Serbia (Jedinstvena Srbija), a political party in Serbia
- JS Global, a Chinese manufacturer of home appliances

== Other uses ==
- JS (Indian magazine), defunct youth magazine
- JS (band), an American female R&B duo
- "JS" (song), by Mamoru Miyano, 2009
- JS, a ship prefix used by the Japanese Maritime Self-Defense Force since 2008
- Jiangsu, a province of China
- Joule-second (J s, or J∙s), describing the amount of action, or the unit measure of angular momentum
- Joule/second (J/s), or watt, a unit of power
- IS tank family, a family of Soviet heavy tanks
- , the official symbol for the Shōnan–Shinjuku Line in Japan

== See also ==
- Sainsbury's, trade name of J Sainsbury plc, the UK's third largest chain of supermarkets
