= Ligier Optima =

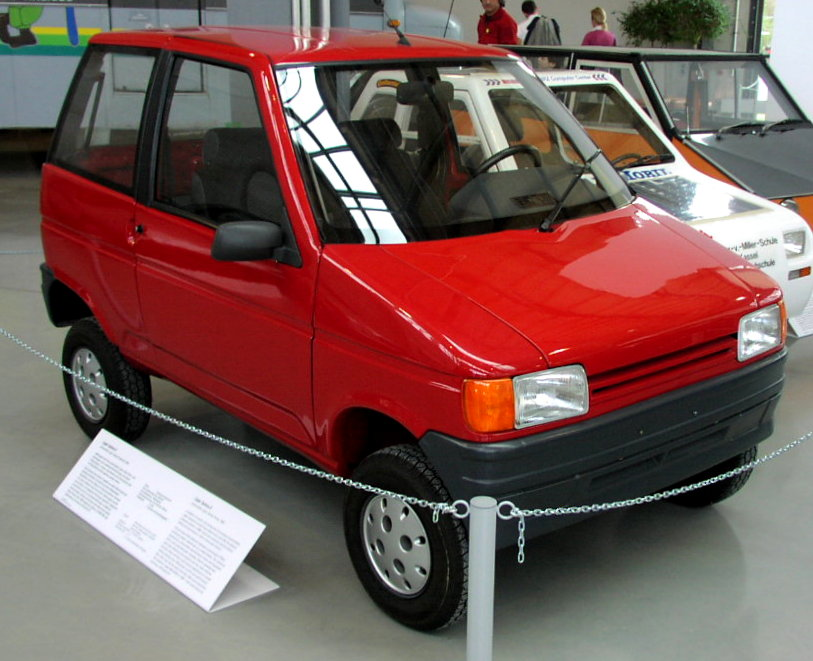
- Ligier Optima II

Overview
- Manufacturer: Ligier
- Also called: Ligier Optimax; Ligier Prima
- Production: 1987-ca. 1995
- Assembly: Abrest, Vichy, France

Body and chassis
- Class: Microcar
- Body style: 3-door hatchback Van (Optimax)
- Layout: Front-engine, front-wheel-drive

Powertrain
- Engine: 49 cc Fichtel & Sachs SC 50 two-stroke single; 265 cc Robin DY27D diesel single; 315 cc Lombardini 15LD 315 diesel single; 325 cc Lombardini 6LD 325 diesel single; 411 cc Perkins diesel I2; 617 cc Perkins 103.06 diesel I3; 654 cc Ruggerini Motori diesel I2
- Transmission: CVT

Dimensions
- Wheelbase: 1,770 mm (69.7 in); 1,968 mm (77.5 in) (Optima 4)
- Length: 2,500 mm (98.4 in); 2,770 mm (109.1 in) (Optima 4)
- Width: 1,370 mm (53.9 in) (Série 7); 1,400 mm (55.1 in) (Optima); 1,470 mm (57.9 in) (Optimax)
- Height: 1,365 mm (53.7 in) (Série 7)
- Kerb weight: 305 kg (672 lb) (Série 7); 750 kg (1,653 lb) (electric)

Chronology
- Predecessor: Ligier Série 5
- Successor: Ligier 162

The Ligier Optima is a four-wheeled, two-seater microcar manufactured from 1987 to about 1995 by Ligier, the street vehicle branch of French Formula One manufacturer Équipe Ligier. There was also a four-seat version offered from 1993 until 1995, called the Optima 4. The car was originally introduced as the Ligier Série 7, but the name was changed to Optima in 1989. It replaced the earlier Série 5, the final development of a series of cars which started with the boxy Ligier JS4. Commonly, Optimas are "Voiture sans permis", light vehicles which do not require a driver's license and thus popular with the elderly, the young, or with those who had lost their driving privileges. Ligier also offered more powerful versions which could be driven with certain limited driver's permits and with very low annual taxes. Versions for export markets often had slightly different engine outputs to meet local requirements.

== Série 7 ==
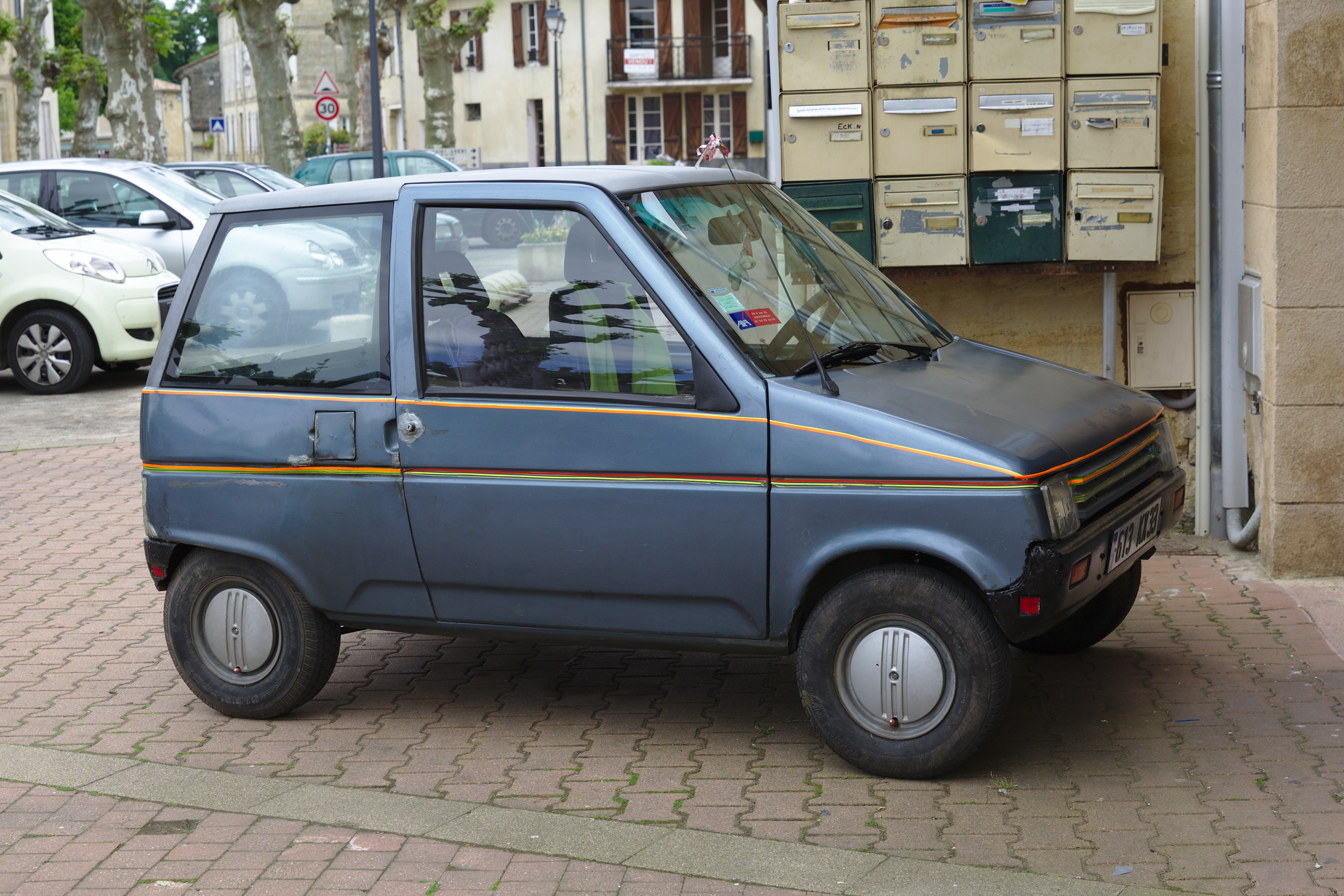
Ligier Série 7, the original design

Introduced in 1987, the Série 7 was decidedly more car-like in appearance than the earlier JS4-derived Série 5. The increase in length also made the car more practical, with a considerably larger cargo area. The car was introduced with a 325 cc single-cylinder diesel engine, but this was soon replaced with an air-cooled 265 cc engine built by Fuji Robin in Japan. Power for the original engine was 5 hp (3.7 kW) and top speed was no more than 45 km/h (28 mph) in order to stay within the parameters for sans-permis vehicles. The later engine develops a claimed 4 kW (5.4 hp), reflecting adjustments in French law resulting from the adoption of SI units.

There was also a version called the Série 7 Twin (or 650 Twin) which required a special quadricycle license and was taxed at 1CV (one tax horsepower, the lowest rating possible). This had a two-cylinder diesel engine built by Italy's Ruggerini Motori. To meet local requirements, German importer AutoTechnik Walther (ATW) offered a 49-cc version with a Sachs two-stroke engine with 3 kW (4 hp). This was sold as the Ligier ATW 50L (later the ATW-Plus 50L).

== Optima ==
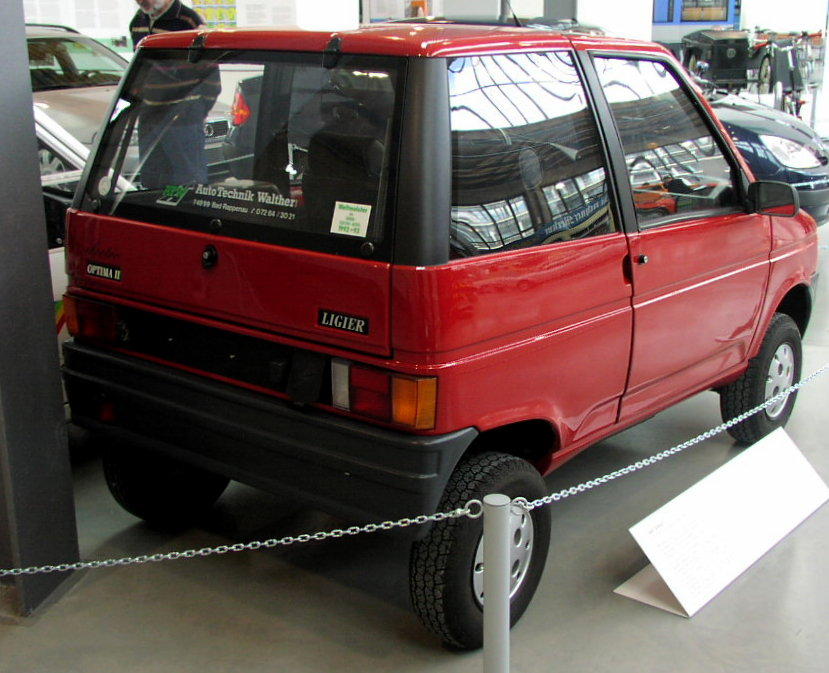
Ligier Optima II (Germany, 50 cc version)

The car received a thorough facelift in November 1989, with orange front turn signals which wrap around the corners, and the name was changed to Ligier Optima. Initially, only the 265 cc diesel engine was on offer, but later there was also an Optima/Optimax Twin available. The two-cylinder versions received front disc brakes. A van with a built-out, boxier rear end along the lines of the Renault Express or the Citroën C15, was also available under the name Optimax. AutoTechnik Walther (ATW) kept on offering a 49-cc version with a German Sachs engine, to meet local needs for permitless operation.

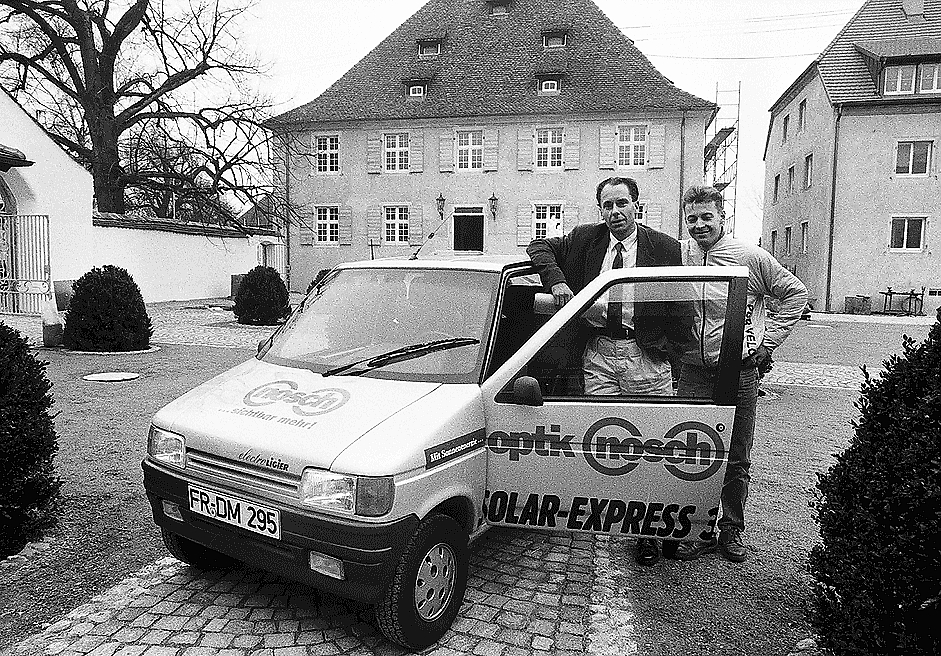
Ligier Electric, Freiburg, 1993

ATW also developed a version with an electric motor, which they installed in their Bad Rappenau facilities. This version used the 10-inch wheels and drum brakes all around, period testers found this insufficient for a car which was 2.5 times the weight of the original and able to reach speeds of over 100 km/h (62 mph) in Power mode. The price was also elevated - with a few options, the price could easily reach DM 40,000 in 1993, equivalent to $54,459 in 2025 and the same as a base model Audi 100 at the time.

After a minor facelift in 1992, the model was sometimes referred to as Optima II. In 1993 it was updated again, now with a larger grille opening with a mesh inside, changing name to Prima (the commercial model was still called the Optimax). The Optima Twin was replaced by the stretched Optima 4, thus named as it could seat four thanks to a longer wheelbase. The Optima 4 offered separately removable rear seats and was only sold with full equipment including tinted windows and seat belts front and rear. The Twin's engine was replaced with a three-cylinder diesel engine by British Perkins Engines, developing 9.6 kW (13 hp) at 3,600 rpm. As with the preceding Optima Twin, this version has front disc brakes to handle the more than doubled power and added weight.

== See also ==
- Guy Ligier
