= Ligier JS4 =

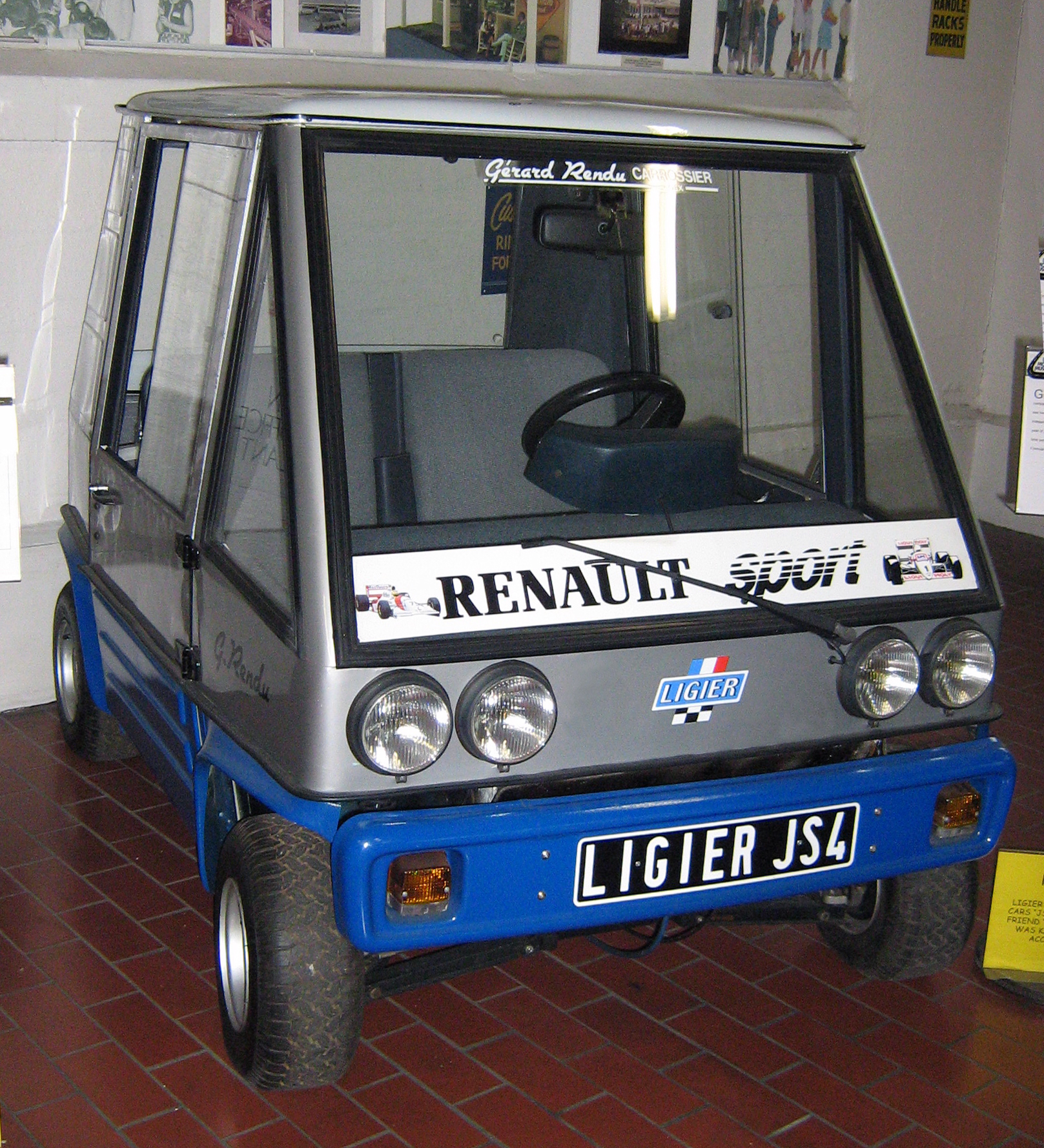

Overview
- Manufacturer: Ligier
- Also called: Ligier JS6; Ligier JS8; Ligier JS10; Ligier 330; Ligier 430; Ligier Série 5
- Production: 1980-1987
- Assembly: Abrest, Vichy, France
- Designer: Robert Broyer; Philippe Ligier

Body and chassis
- Class: Microcar
- Body style: 3-door hatchback Pickup
- Layout: Rear-engine, rear-wheel-drive

Powertrain
- Engine: 49 cc Motobécane 99Z two-stroke single; 49 cc Derbi D50L two-stroke single; 125 cc BCB two-stroke single; 325 cc Lombardini diesel single; 327 cc Ducati-VM RH175A diesel single; 430 cc Ducati-VM RH186A diesel single
- Transmission: CVT

Dimensions
- Wheelbase: 1,350 mm (53.1 in)
- Length: 1,974 mm (77.7 in)
- Width: 1,280 mm (50.4 in)
- Height: 1,422 mm (56.0 in)
- Kerb weight: 215 kg (474 lb)

Chronology
- Successor: Ligier Série 7

The Ligier JS4 is a four-wheeled, two-seater microcar manufactured from 1980 to 1983 by Ligier, the street vehicle branch of French Formula One manufacturer Équipe Ligier. It marked a change in Ligier's priorities as they had recently ended manufacture of the Ligier JS2 sports car. It is a "Voiture sans permis", a light vehicle which did not require a driver's license and was thus popular with the elderly, the young, or with those who had lost their driving privileges. The JS4 was first presented on 25 July 1980.

== Design ==
After abandoning the field of sports car manufacture Ligier briefly submanufactured tractor cabins for Renault V.I., beginning in 1978. The JS4 was designed using one of these cabins. It was a steel monococque with a short wheelbase and (comparatively) wide track. It is of square rigged appearance, with large, flat glass surfaces and a glazed rear door, and unusually fat tires. It received independent suspension on all four wheels, drum brakes all around, and rack-and-pinion steering. The single-cylinder engine is mounted at the rear, below the luggage compartment, and produces 3.2 hp (2.4 kW) and powers the rear wheels through a continuously variable transmission.

The JS4, with its pleasant appearance and Formula One heritage, proved a strong seller. 6941 were sold in 1981, its first full year of production, a very good number for a voiturette. The Ligier Formula One team used an example painted in the team colors as a pit vehicle; that example currently resides in the Lane Motor Museum in Nashville, Tennessee. In late 1981 the lineup had been divided into the JS4 Standard, Luxe, and Grand Luxe, with corresponding equipment and trim. Soon, however, quality issues began to pop up. The steel body, while strong, was heavy and led to drive axles failing, and exposed a weak transmission. The steel body also rusted, something that was not a problem with the mostly plastic-bodied competition.

=== Facelifts ===
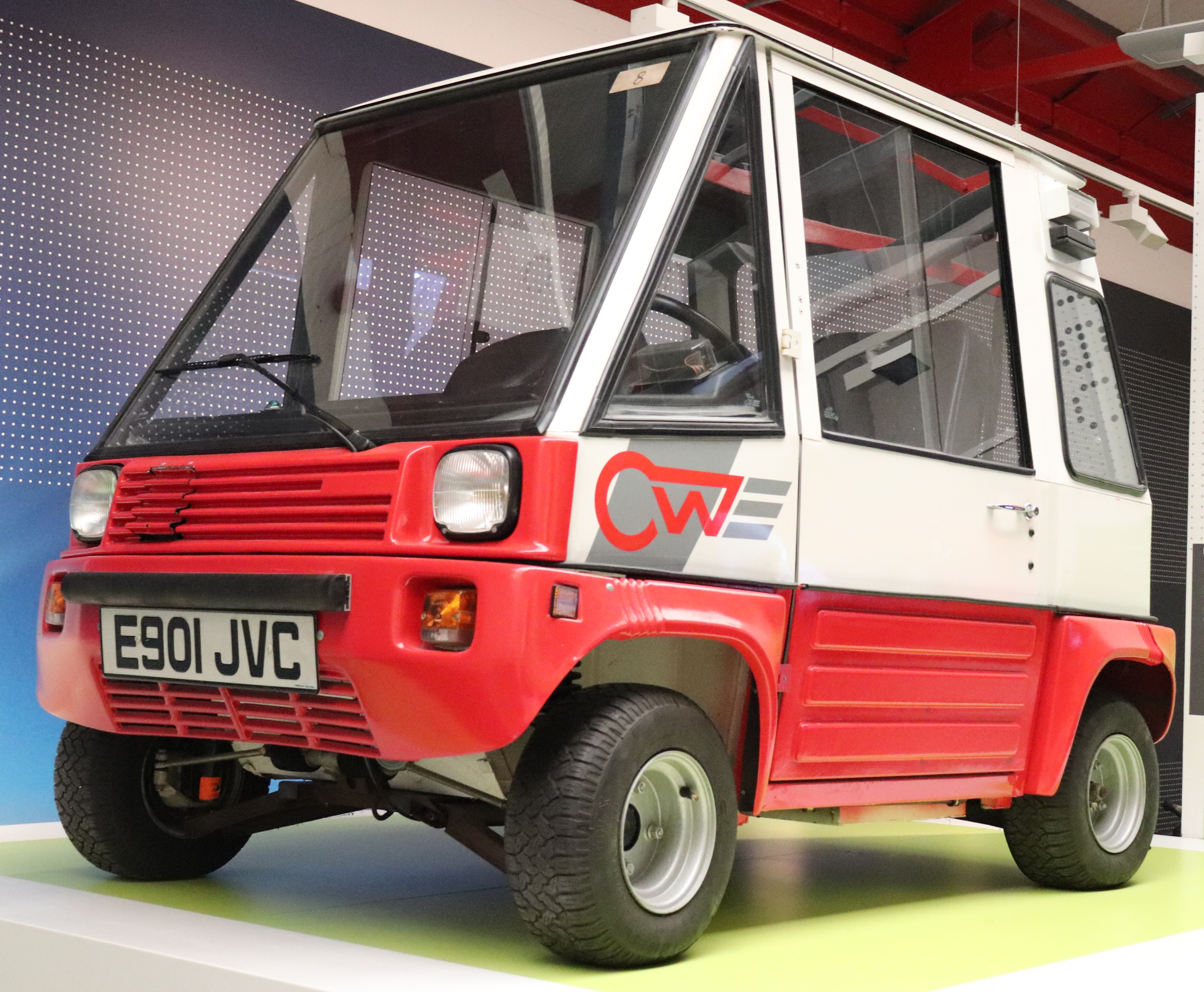
1987 Ligier JS6; here an electrified version developed by City Wheels Limited for an early carsharing scheme

In 1982 the more expensive JS8 model appeared, mostly the same as the JS4 but equipped with a 125 cc BCB engine. The more capable JS8 has 7.5 hp (5.5 kW) and required an A4 permit (tricycle/quadricycle), unlike the JS4 (and later JS6) which required no permit at all as they had less than 5 hp (3.7 kW) and a top speed under 45 km/h (28 mph). For 1984, the 50 cc JS4 was replaced by the similar JS6, which has a more rounded front, with squared off headlights and a faux grille in black plastic. The JS4's Motobécane engine was replaced by a more powerful 49 cc Derbi unit which reached the maximum possible 5 horsepower rating, while the JS6 was also offered with a 327 cc Ducati-VM diesel with the same power.

Ligier also developed a longer truck version with a 350 kg (772 lb) payload, with a pickup bed or a cargo box, called the JS10. First shown at the end of 1983, the JS10 was fitted with a larger, 430 cc diesel engine with 8 hp (5.9 kW) and a top speed of about 75 km/h (47 mph). Its overall length increased to 2.65 m (104 in). The Ligier JS10 was under consideration with the PTT for replacing their large fleet of Piaggio Ape three-wheeled trucks, and a militarized version was also planned.

The JS6 and JS8 were available in numerous versions, beginning with the basic Standard, followed by Luxe and Grand Luxe (typically stylized JS6, JS6L, JS6GL). The JS8 was also available in a topless "Plage" (Beach) version, and Ligier offered single-seater cargo models called Société as well.

The JS8/10 design was later developed into the 330 and 430 versions, by which time the petrol-engined options were discontinued. The 330 CLD developed 5 hp (3.7 kW), while the better equipped 430 XLD's larger VM engine had 10 hp (7.4 kW) on tap. As with the JS10 and the JS8, the 430 required an A4 permit to operate. The longer JS10 truck version was updated but changed to the smaller diesel engine; it was now called the 330 U (UL for the box van model).

After a final facelift in late 1986, the car was known as the Ligier Série 5. This model had a longer front end but was only built for about a year, when it was replaced by the new Série 7.

== See also ==
- Guy Ligier
