= Subaru Industrial EX engine =

The EX engine series from Subaru Industrial Power Products includes nine models total, with power ranges from 4.5 to 14 horsepower. All engines in this line are four-cycle, single-cylinder, air-cooled engines.

== Technology ==
This line is Subaru's first to utilize chain-driven overhead cam (OHC) technology, and the first to utilize OHC technology in the industrial air-cooled small engine market. The significance of Overhead Cam technology is that it has been proven to enhance engine performance. The technology allows the intake and exhaust valves being positioned for optimum engine performance, which offers lower resistance for the air/fuel mixture flow. Overhead Cam engines also have fewer moving parts and produce less mechanical noise than competitive technologies. They also offer better cooling performance to combat overheating.

== Models ==
With one exception, all engines in the EX line are carbureted. The 7 horsepower EX21 EFI is an electronic fuel injection engine. The engine line was first introduced with four models in 2001, and has grown to include nine models.

=== EX Engine Models ===
- EX13 – 4.5 horsepower
- EX17 – 6 horsepower
- EX21 – 7 horsepower
- EX27 – 9 horsepower
- EX30 – 9.5 horsepower
- EX35 – 12 horsepower
- EX40 – 14 horsepower
- EX21 EFI – 7 horsepower
- EX27 All Season – 9 horsepower

== Applications ==
The engines can be used on construction equipment such as soil compactors, pressure washers, generators, water pumps, air compressors, log splitters, lawn and turf seeders and chippers/shredders. The engines have also found to work well on go-karts.
