= Subaru Industrial SX engine =

The Subaru Industrial SX engine series from Subaru Industrial Power Products are designed specifically for use with snow throwers, also known as snow blower. The line includes four models, the 6 horsepower SX17, the 7 horsepower SX21 and the 9.5 horsepower SX30 and the SX40-14 horsepower

== Technology ==
The SX line incorporates many of the same technology features as other Subaru industrial engines; most notable is Overhead Cam (OHC) technology. Overhead Cam technology has been proven to enhance engine performance. The technology allows the intake and exhaust valves being positioned for optimum engine performance, which offers lower resistance for the air/fuel mixture flow. Overhead Cam engines also have fewer moving parts and produce less mechanical noise than competitive technologies.

== Applications ==
The SX engines are designed specifically for use with snow throwers.
