= Subaru Industrial V-Twin engine =

Subaru Industrial V-Twin
- Country: Japan
- Introduced: Late 1990s
- Markets: Worldwide

The V-Twin engine series from Subaru Industrial Power Products includes six models, with power ranges from 18 to 28 horsepower. These internal combustion engines feature a dual-cylinder design that resembles a “V”, a common and identifying feature of most V-twin engines.

== Technology ==
Subaru’s V-Twins feature overhead valve (OHV) technology. OHV engines are known to be durable and compact in size. The OHV engine design is fairly simple and consists of a camshaft installed inside the engine block and valves are operated through lifters, pushrods and rocker arms.

== Models ==
The engine line was first introduced with three models, with the fourth model joining in 1998. Two new engines were recently added to the V-Twin line, the 25 horsepower EH72 LP/NG and the 28 horsepower V-Twin EFI.

=== V-Twin Engine Models ===
- EH63 – 18 horsepower
- EH64 – 20.5 horsepower
- EH65 – 22 horsepower
- EH72 – 25 horsepower
- LP/NG – 25 horsepower
- EFI – 28 horsepower

== Engine Applications ==
The engines are often used on hot pressure washers and generators, and a variety of larger construction equipment like trenchers, ride-on trowels, concrete saws and vibratory rollers. They’re also suitable for industrial and turf applications, including large riding lawnmowers.
