= Ligier =

French automobile manufacturer

Ligier Automotive
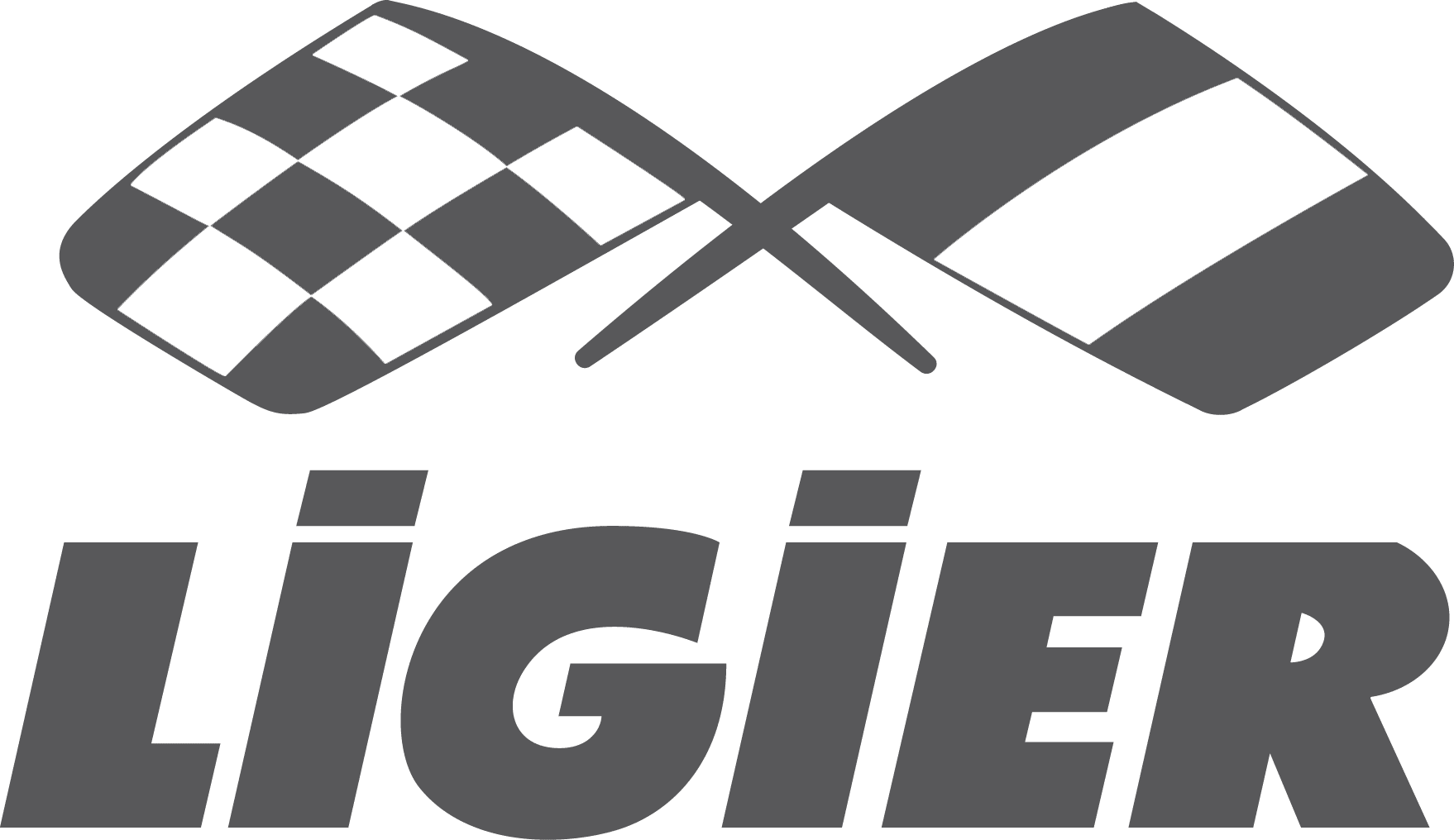
- Type: Subsidiary
- Industry: Automobile & Formula One
- Founded: 1968; 58 years ago
- Founder: Guy Ligier
- Headquarters: Abrest, France
- Key people: Jacques Nicolet (President); Pierre Nicolet (CEO)
- Revenue: ▲€178.6 million (2022)
- Net income: ▲€9.3 million (2022)
- Parent: Ligier Automotive; 21 Investimenti Partners
- Website: ligier.fr

Ligier (French pronunciation: [li.ʒje]) is a French automobile and minibus maker created by former racing driver and rugby player Guy Ligier (1930–2015), specialized in the manufacturing of microcars. Ligier is best known for its involvement in the Formula 1 World Championship between 1976 and 1996.

In collaboration with Automobiles Martini, the Ligier-Martini entity offered sports prototypes used in endurance or hillclimbing (CN). After the announcement of the creation of the new category LMP3 by the ACO, Ligier and Martini are associated with Onroak Automotive (the manufacturer department of OAK Racing) to offer a full range of prototypes (CN, LMP3, LMP1 and LMP2).

== History ==
The firm entered the automobile business with the Ligier JS2, a mid-engined sports car for the road initially powered by a Ford V6 and from 1971 by the same Maserati V6 engine as the Citroën SM. The Ligier motorcars were all designated with the prefix "JS" in honour of Ligier's friend and cohort Jo Schlesser who was killed in the 1968 French Grand Prix while driving for Honda. The final SMs were also produced in the Ligier factory in Vichy. The 1973 energy crisis caused such a decline in the market for the JS2 that production ceased soon after, and the firm changed its focus to microcars, beginning with the 1980 moped-powered Ligier JS4.

One of the world's first experimental prototypes of automatic parallel parking was developed on a Ligier electric car at INRIA in the mid-1990s.

In September 2008, Ligier Automobiles completed its acquisition of Beneteau Group's Microcar division, with financing provided by 21 Investimenti Partners. Phillipe Ligier, son of the company's founder, remains as CEO. The Ligier and Microcar brands are to retain their separate identities and manufacturing facilities. The merger creates Europe's second largest microcar manufacturer (after Daimler's Smart unit, if one considers that a microcar), and largest manufacturer of driver's license-exempt vehicles.

In 2011, Ligier launched the Duè brand, intended to market lightweight quadricycles at a low price with a low-cost philosophy. The first model was the Dué First, which was essentially a revised version of the previous Microcar MC1 with simplified design and features to lower the price. After just two years, the Duè brand was integrated into the Microcar range, another brand of the Ligier Group, and the Microcar Dué, a specific and new model, was launched.

In August 2018, Ligier teased a new road-going sports car to celebrate their 50th anniversary. The car will be built in collaboration with Onroak. It will feature a 3.7-liter V6 producing approximately 330 hp, and a 6-speed manual transmission. It will be homologated to the FIA E II-SH regulation. More details are to be released in September 2018, and it is expected to go on sale in November 2018 at a price of €89,000.

In 2023, Ligier launched its first electric quadricycle, named Myli.

In January 2025, Ligier announced the closure of the Montaigu-Vendée factory, concentrating all production at the Abrest (historic headquarters) plant.

In January 2026, a JS50 Diesel set a new record for the slowest lap time on the Nurburgring, with 28 minutes, 25.8 seconds. This was longer than the previous slow lap record, set in 1960 by a Trabant P50, by almost nine minutes.

== Models ==
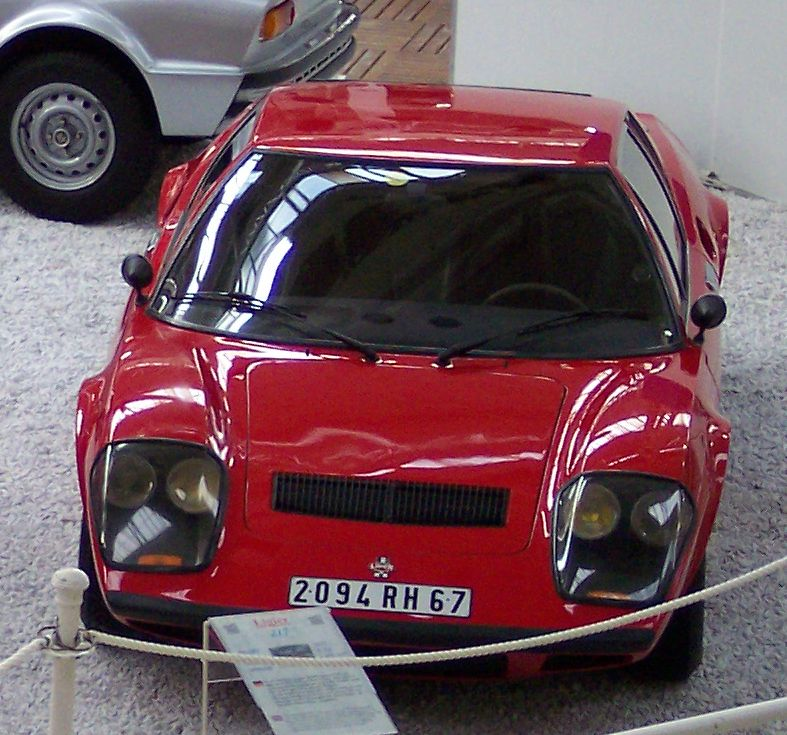
Ligier JS2.

The Ligier model line currently consists of the JS50 line of mini cars, the X-Pro line of small commercial vehicles, and the Be Up/Be Two line of open-air, roadster-type vehicles. The company also produces a line of quad bikes and off-road utility vehicles sold as the Be Pro, Be Four, and Be Truck.

The JS50, Ixo, Xtoo, Nova, or Ambra are about two and a half meters long and have two seats. They are front-engined. Power units include two 2-cylinder four-stroke diesels of about half a liter displacement and feature a CVT for power transfer.

=== EZ10 ===
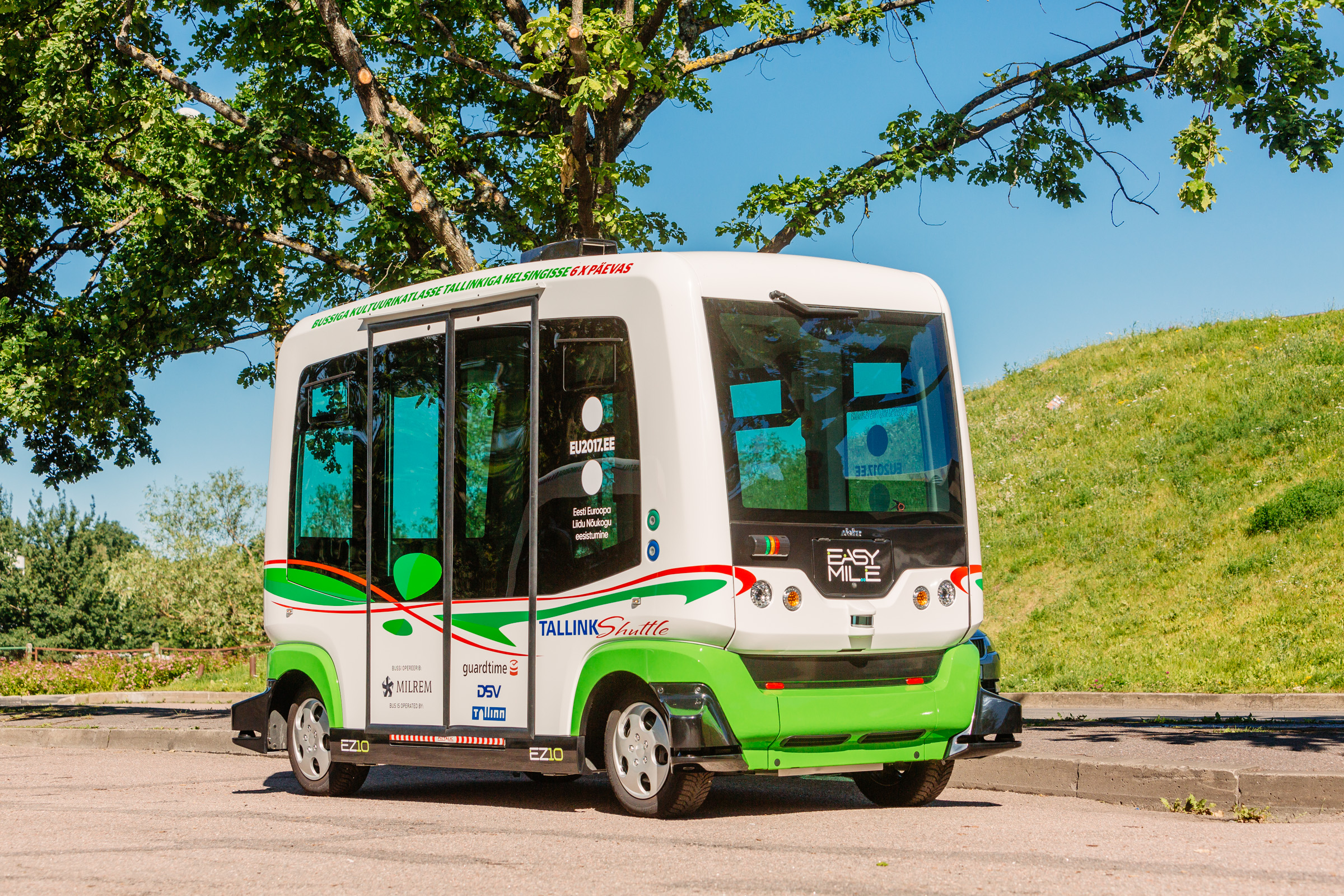
Ligier EZ10 self-driving minibus

The EZ10 EasyMile is a self-driving shuttle bus for light city transit. EasyMile SAS develops and markets the autonomous vehicles, and is a joint venture formed in June 2014 by Ligier and Robosoft Technology PTE Ltd (France). The joint venture is the result of the CityMobil2 project co-funded by the European Union's Seventh Framework Programme for research and technological development (FP7).

One EZ10 minibus can take between 8–10 passengers, and its speed is up to 40 km/h (25 mph). In 2017, EZ-10 was introduced on the grounds of National Taiwan University in Taipei, and in Tallinn, Estonia.

In conjunction with Estonia's presidency of the EU Council, the minibus was presented in Tallinn on 14 July 2017 by EasyMile, and the tech companies in Estonia that co-financed the month-and-a-half-long project to bring the shuttle bus to the country. The buses will serve one line, including a stretch of tram line under reconstruction, and will run in Tallinn until the end of August.

=== Microcars ===
- Ligier JS4 (1980–1987)
- Ligier Optima (1987–1995)
- Ligier 162 (1995–2002)
- Ligier Ambra (2001–2011)
- Ligier Nova (2002–present)
- Ligier Be Up (2000–present)
- Ligier X-Too (2004–2010)
- Ligier IXO (2010–2014)
- Ligier JS RC (2012–2016)
- Ligier JS 50 (2012–present)
- Ligier JS 60 (2020–present)
- Ligier Pulse 3 (2014–present)
- Ligier Pulse 4 (2013–present)
- Ligier Myli (2023–present)
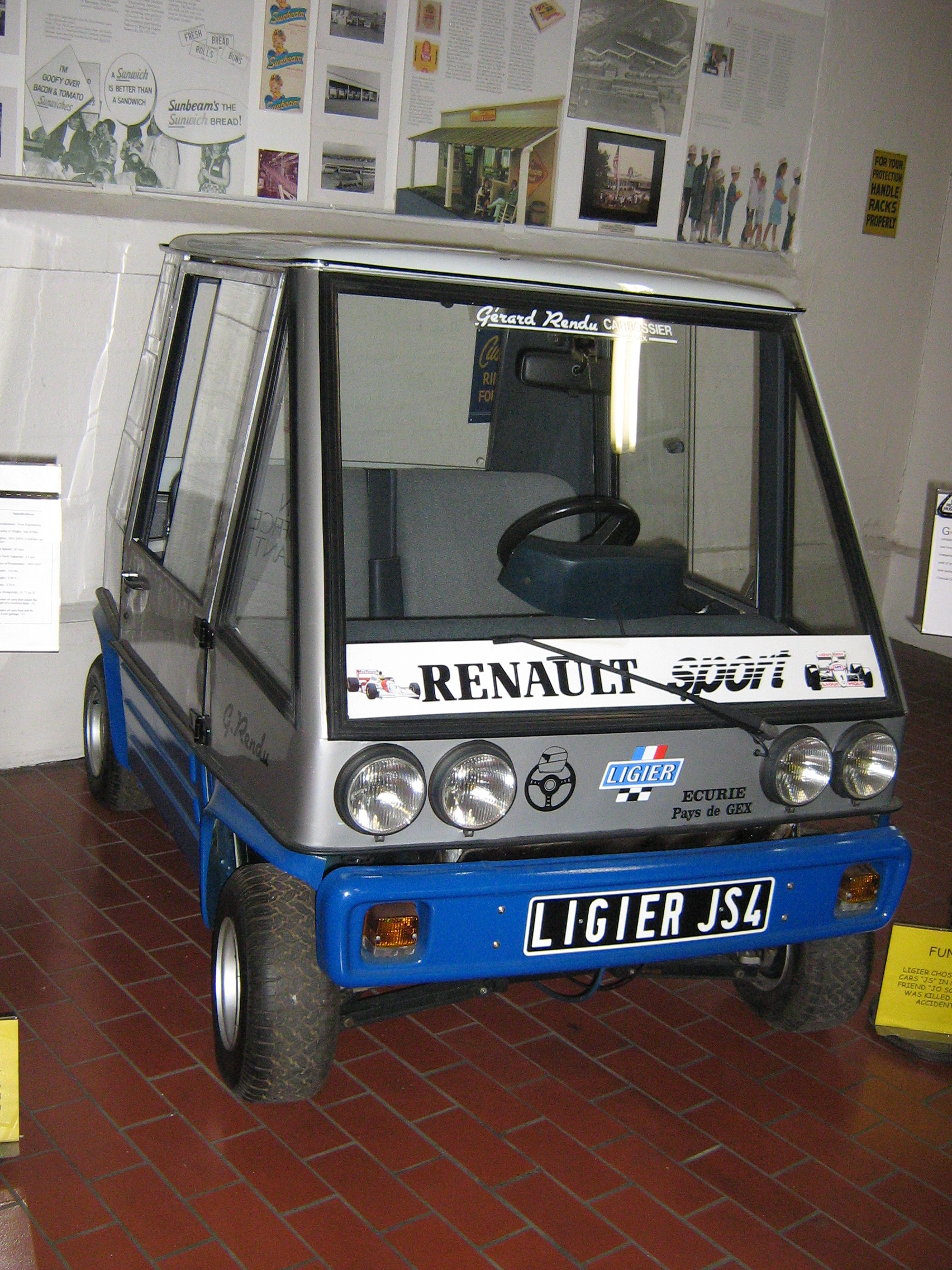
Ligier JS4 (1980)

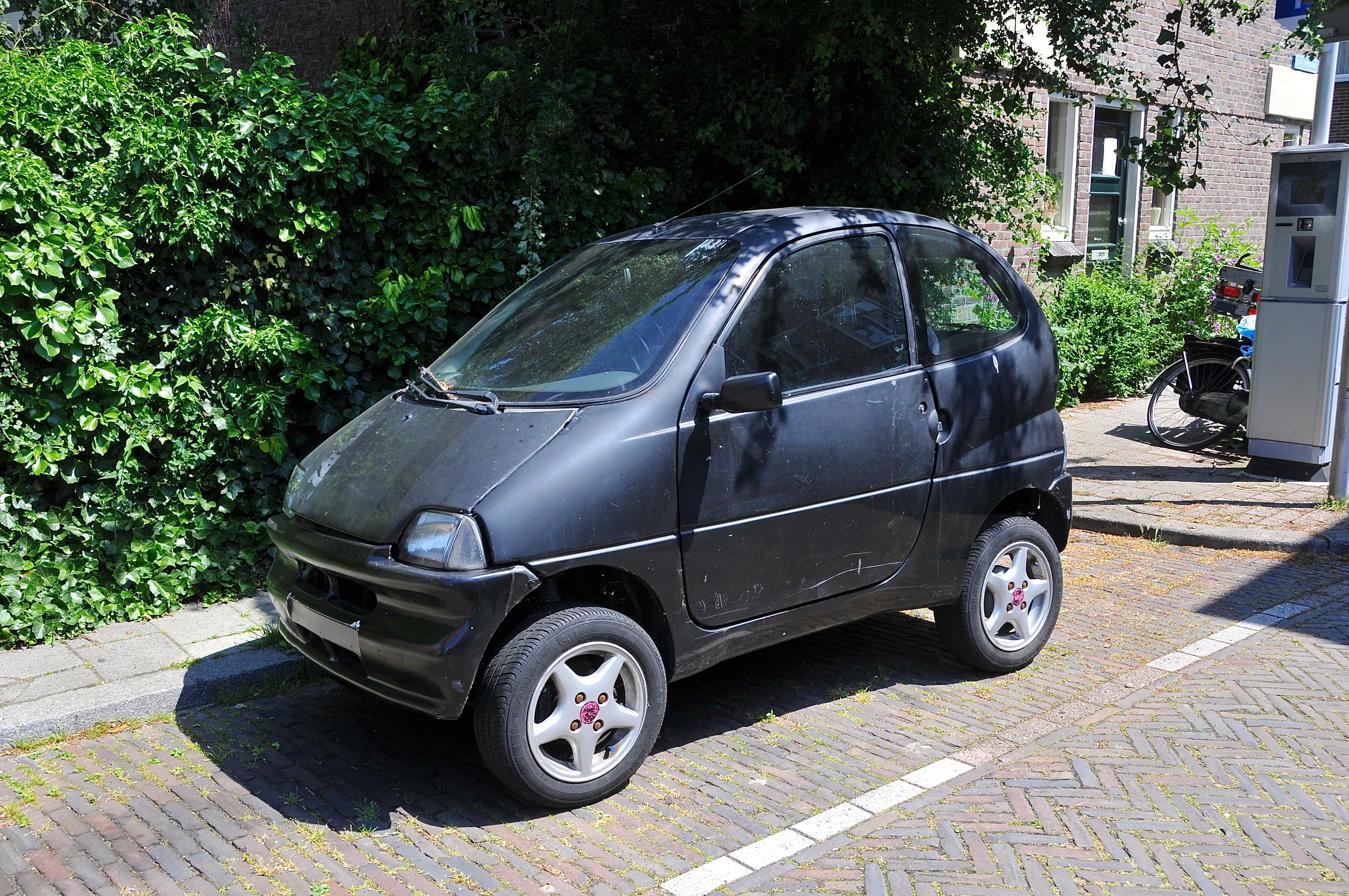
Ligier Ambra

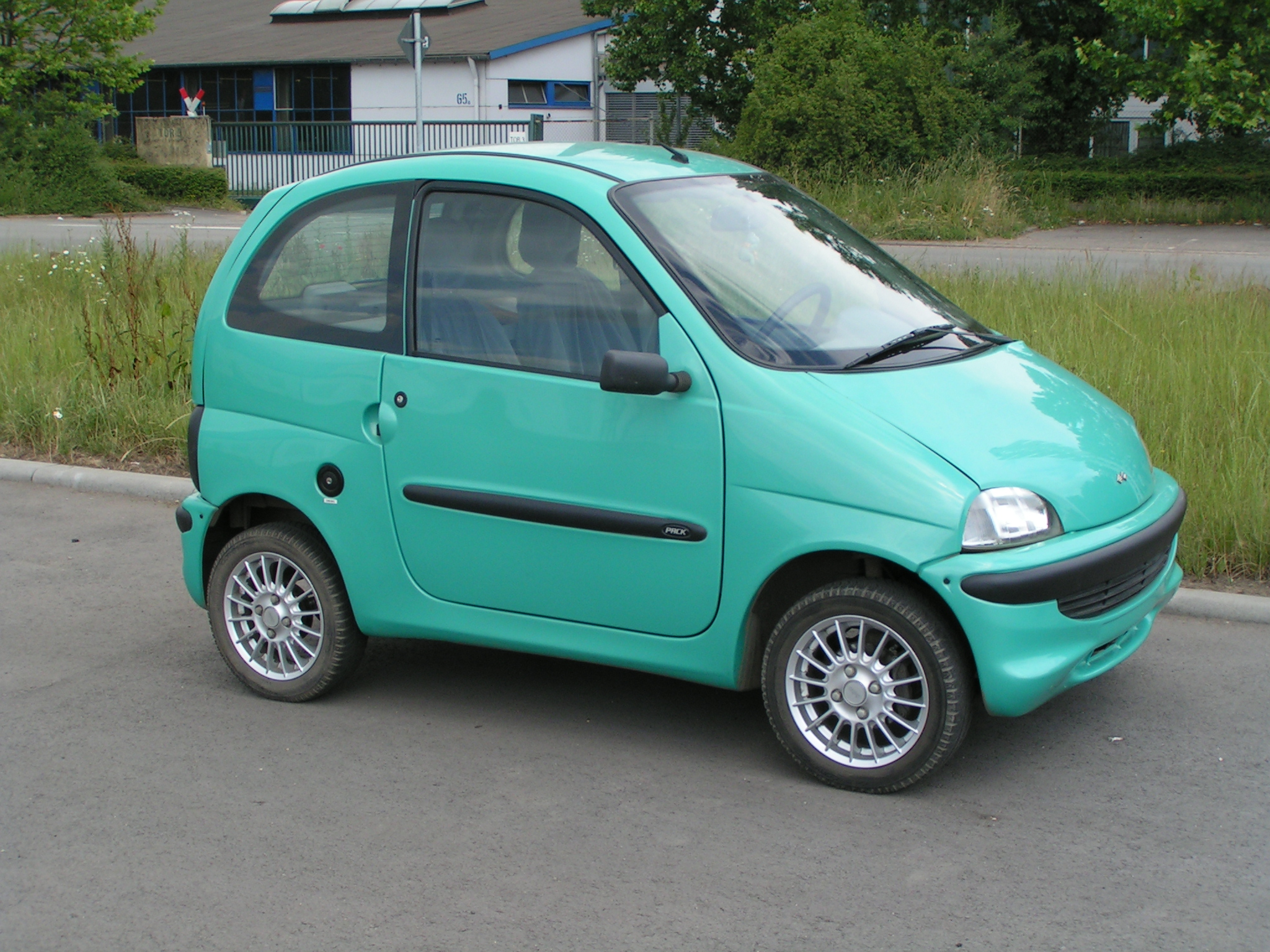
Ligier Nova

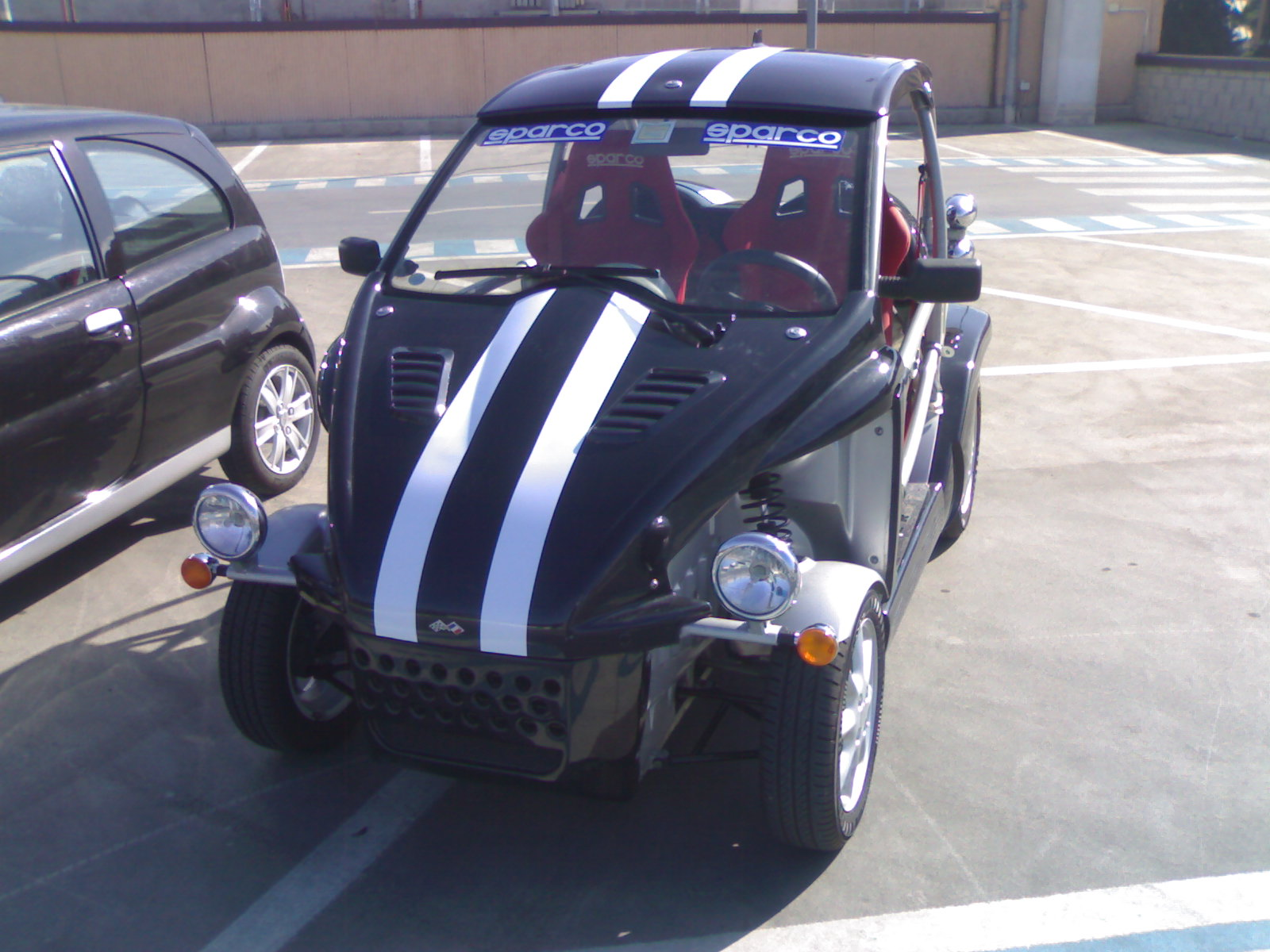
Ligier Be Up

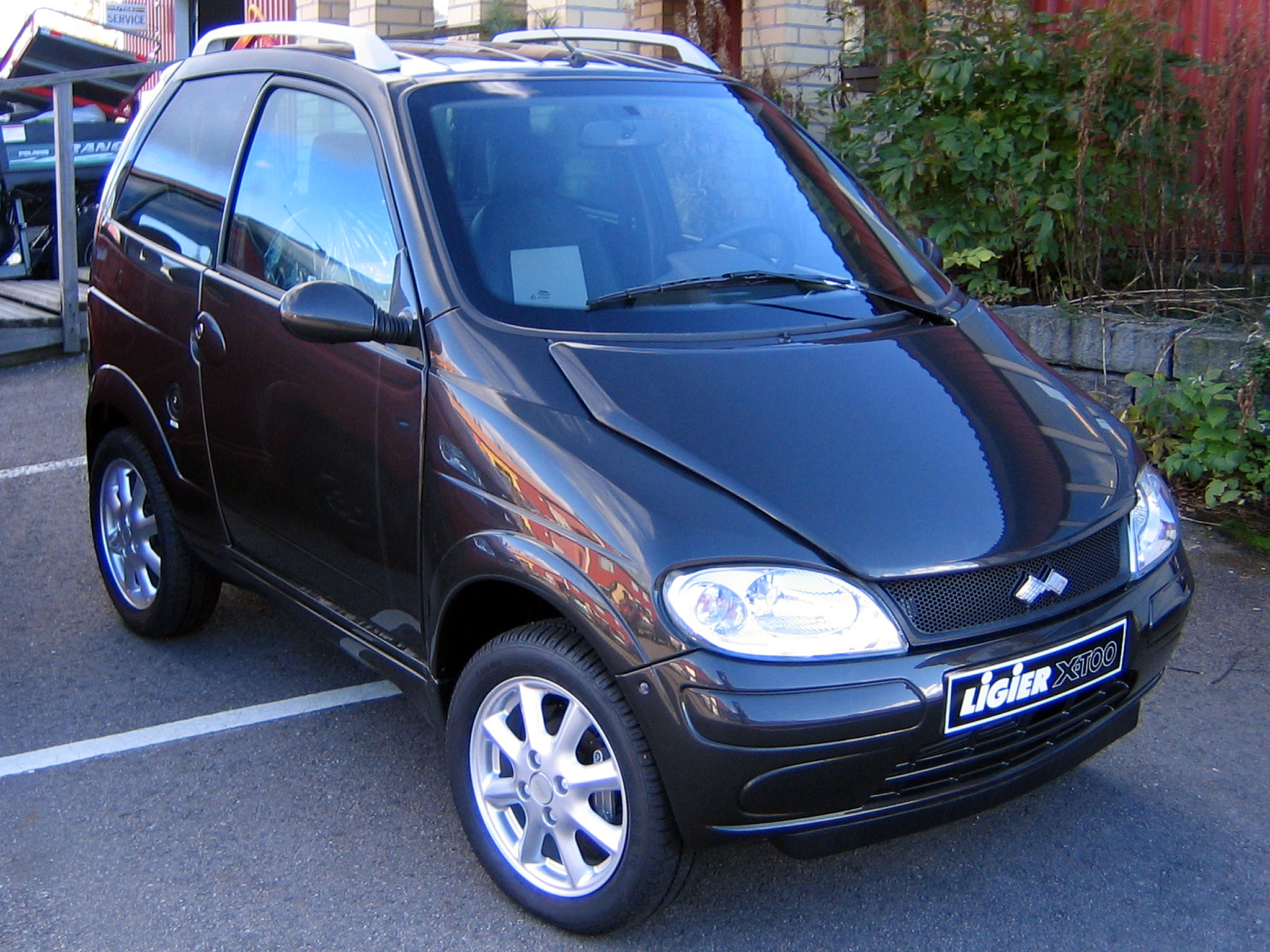
Ligier X-Too

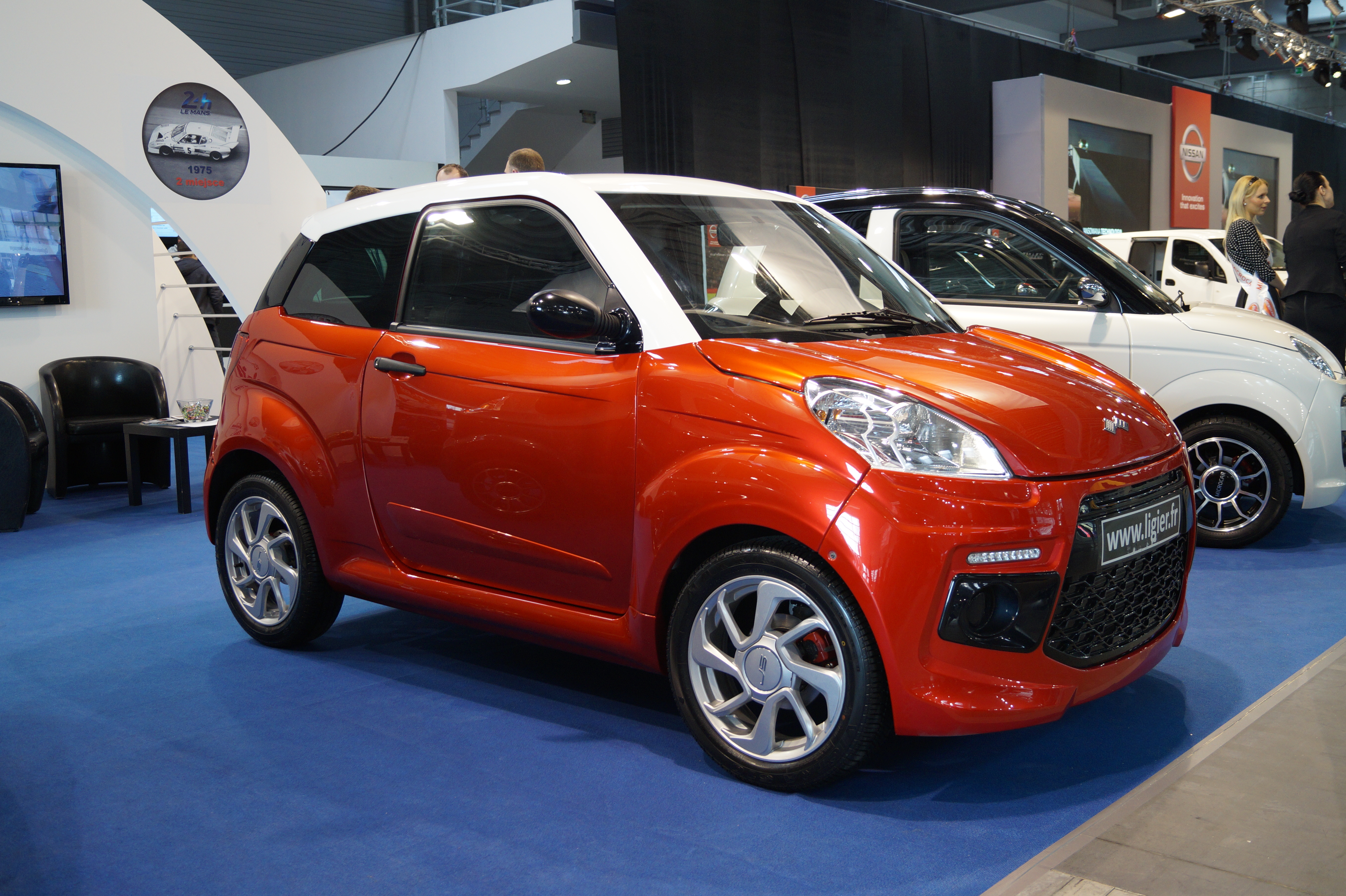
Ligier JS50

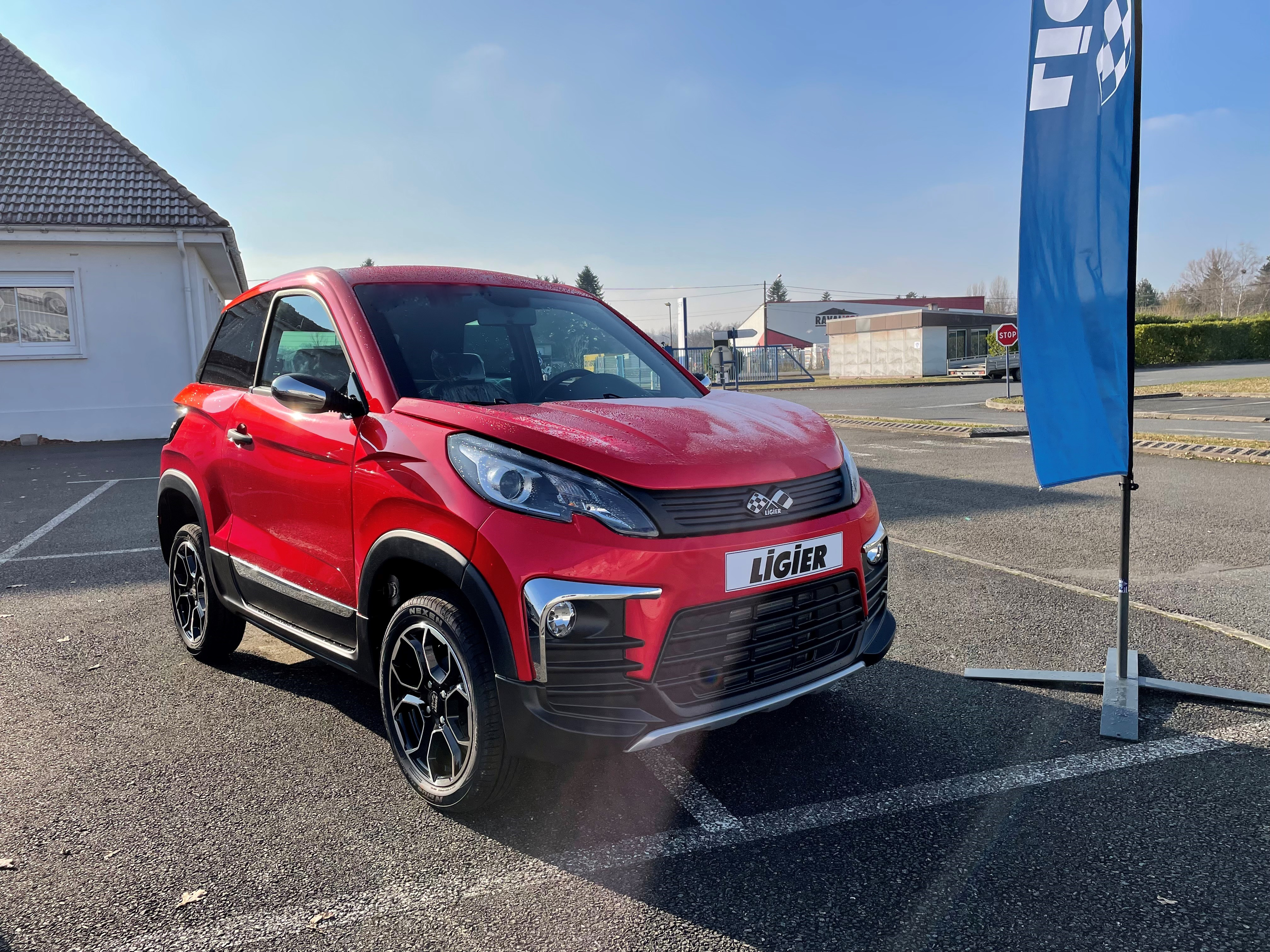
Ligier JS60

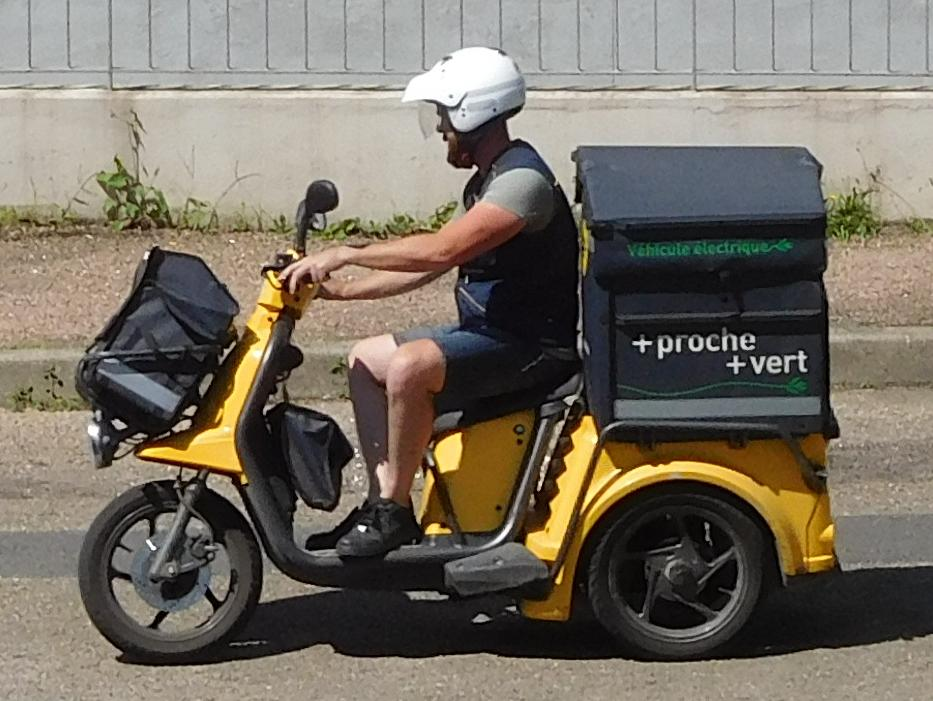
Ligier Staby used by the French post office

== Ligier in motorsport ==
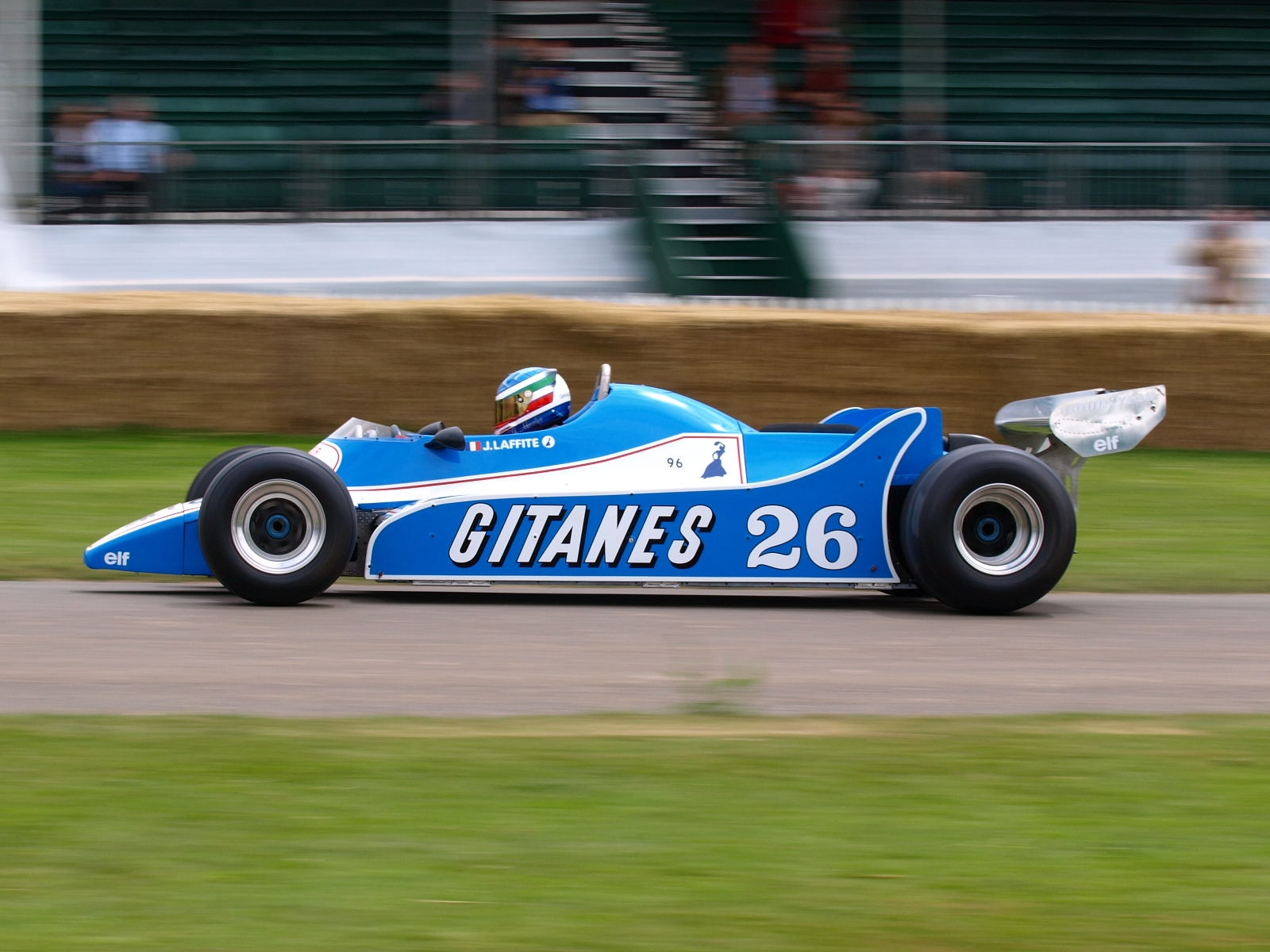
The 1980 Ligier JS11/15 Formula One car

Ligier is best known for its Formula One team, Équipe Ligier, that operated from 1976 to 1996. Ligier entered Formula One in 1976 with a Matra V12-powered car, winning its first Grand Prix with Jacques Laffite in 1977.

Ligier also competed in the 24 Hours of Le Mans from 1970 to 1975.

== Gallery ==
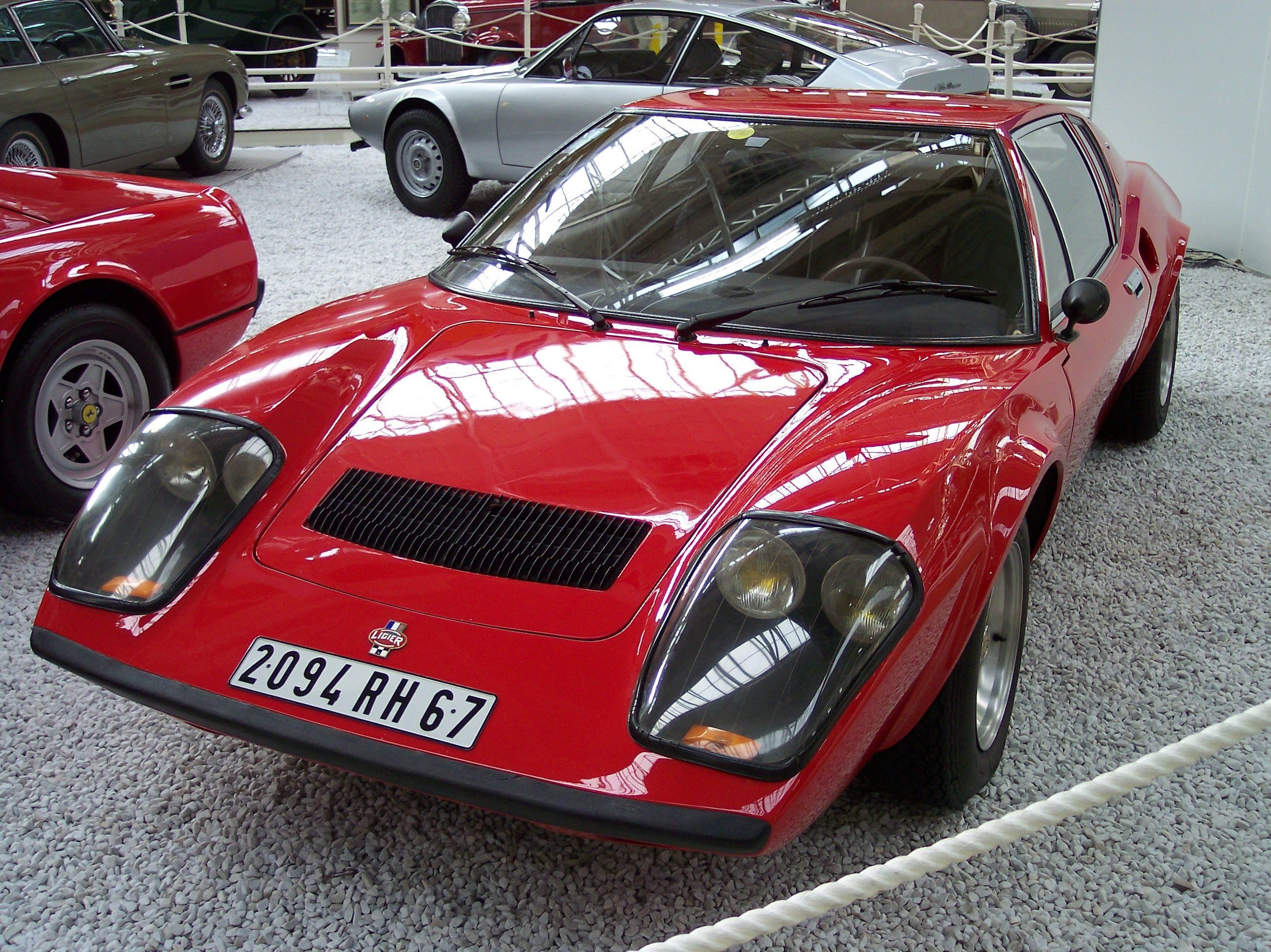
Ligier JS2

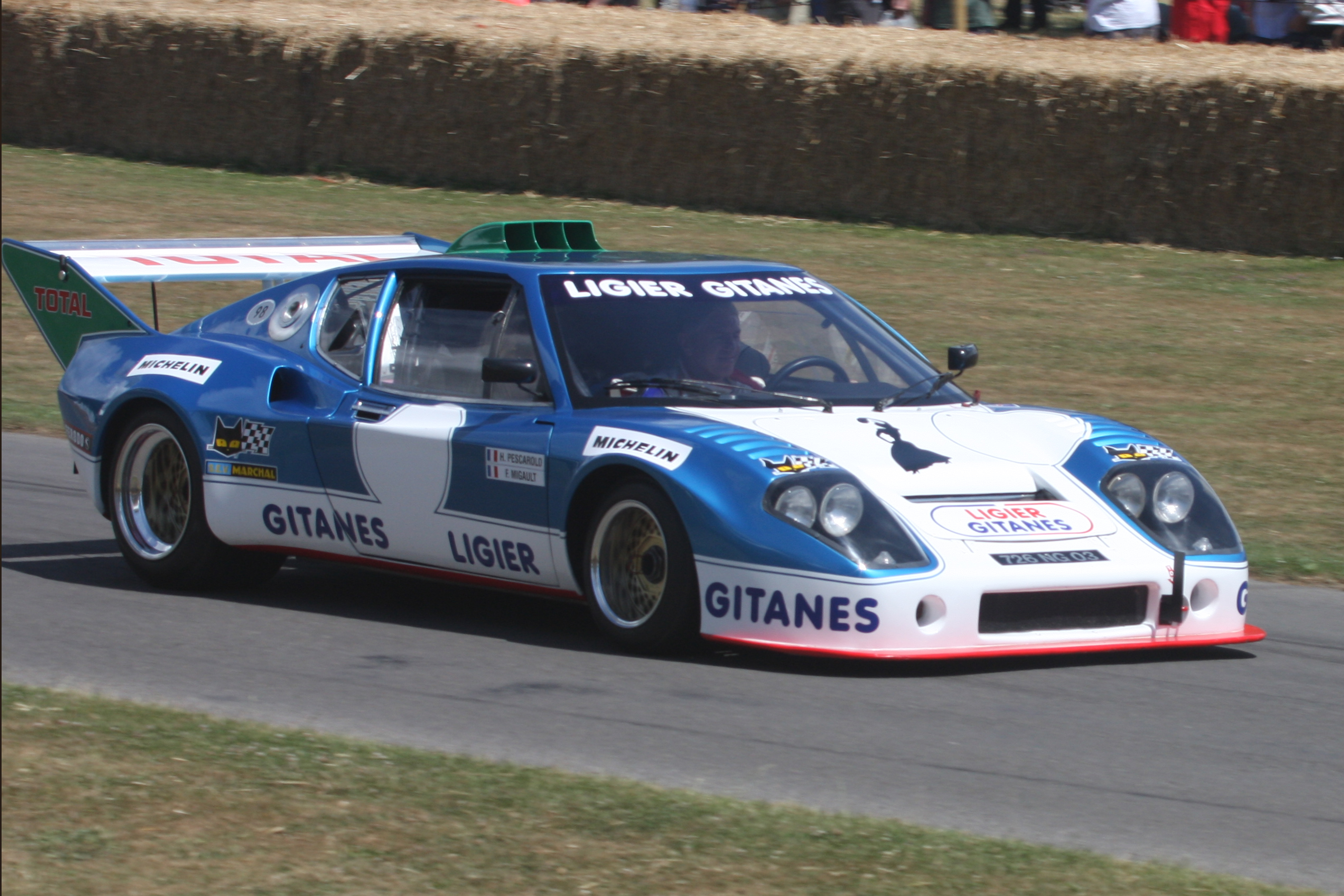
Ligier JS2

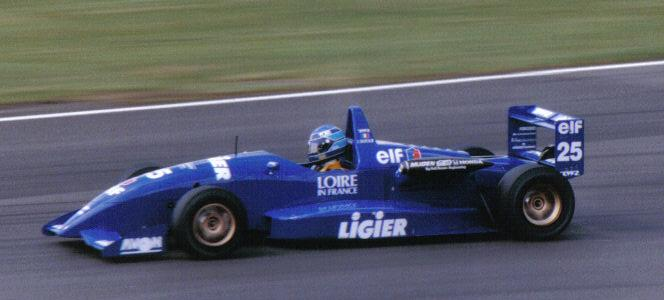
Ligier Junior Team (Jérémie Dufour, British Formula Three Championship, 1995)

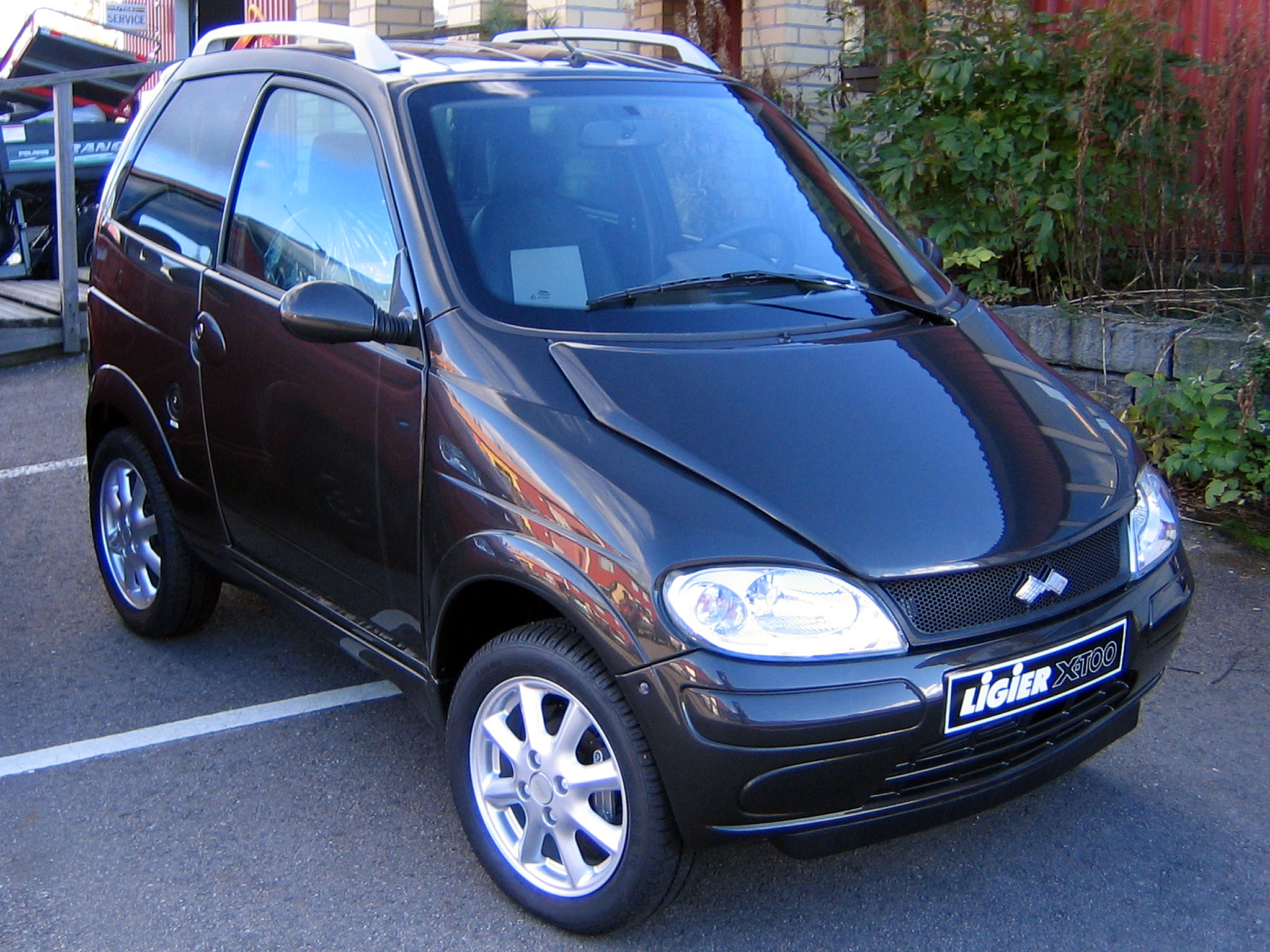
Ligier X-Too (Microcar)

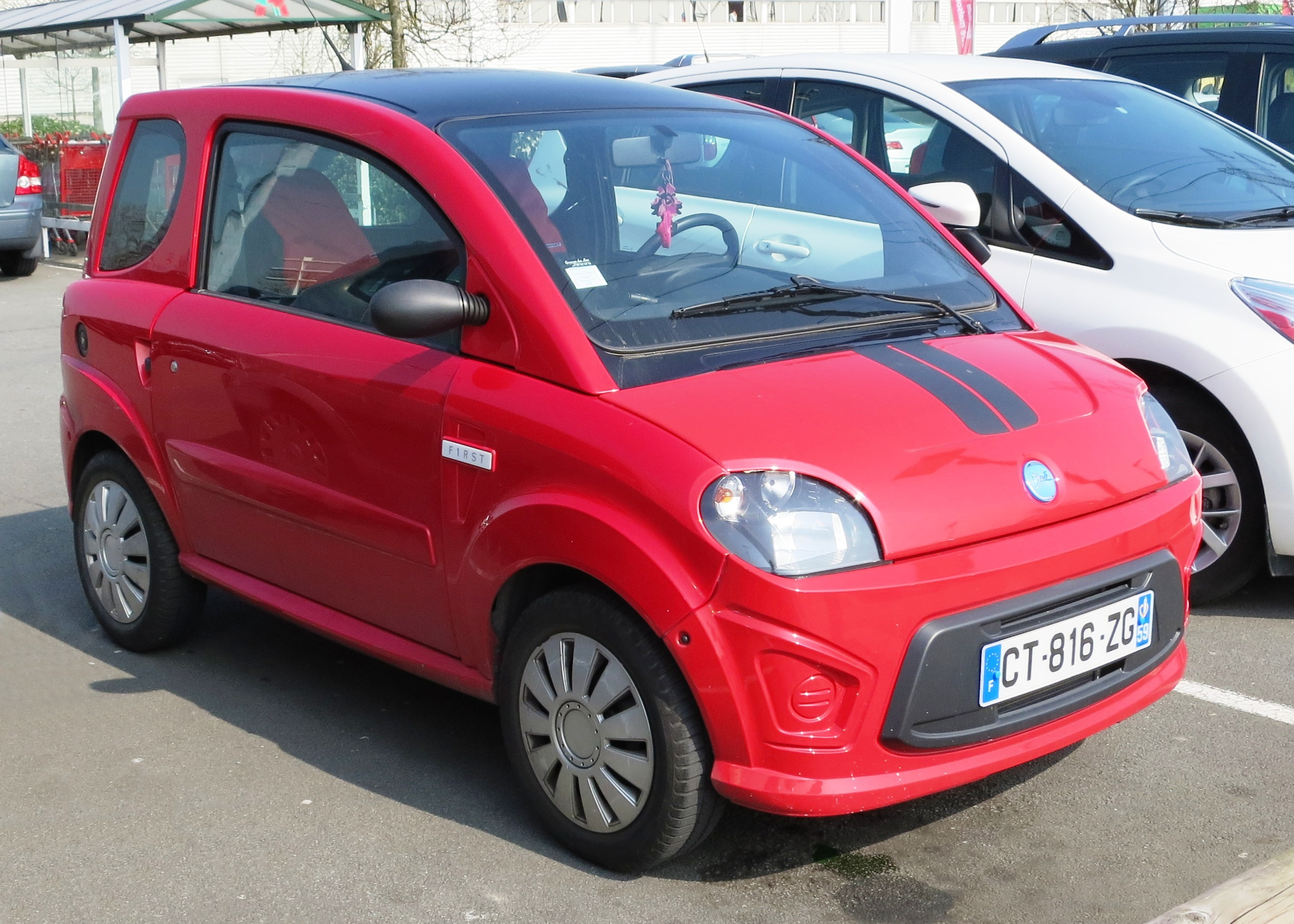
Ligier Dué First (Microcar; 2015)

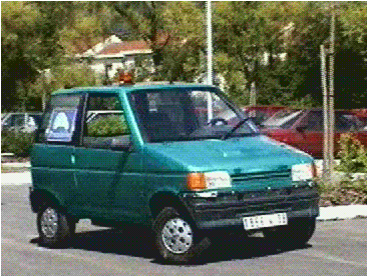
Experimental prototype capable of self-parking

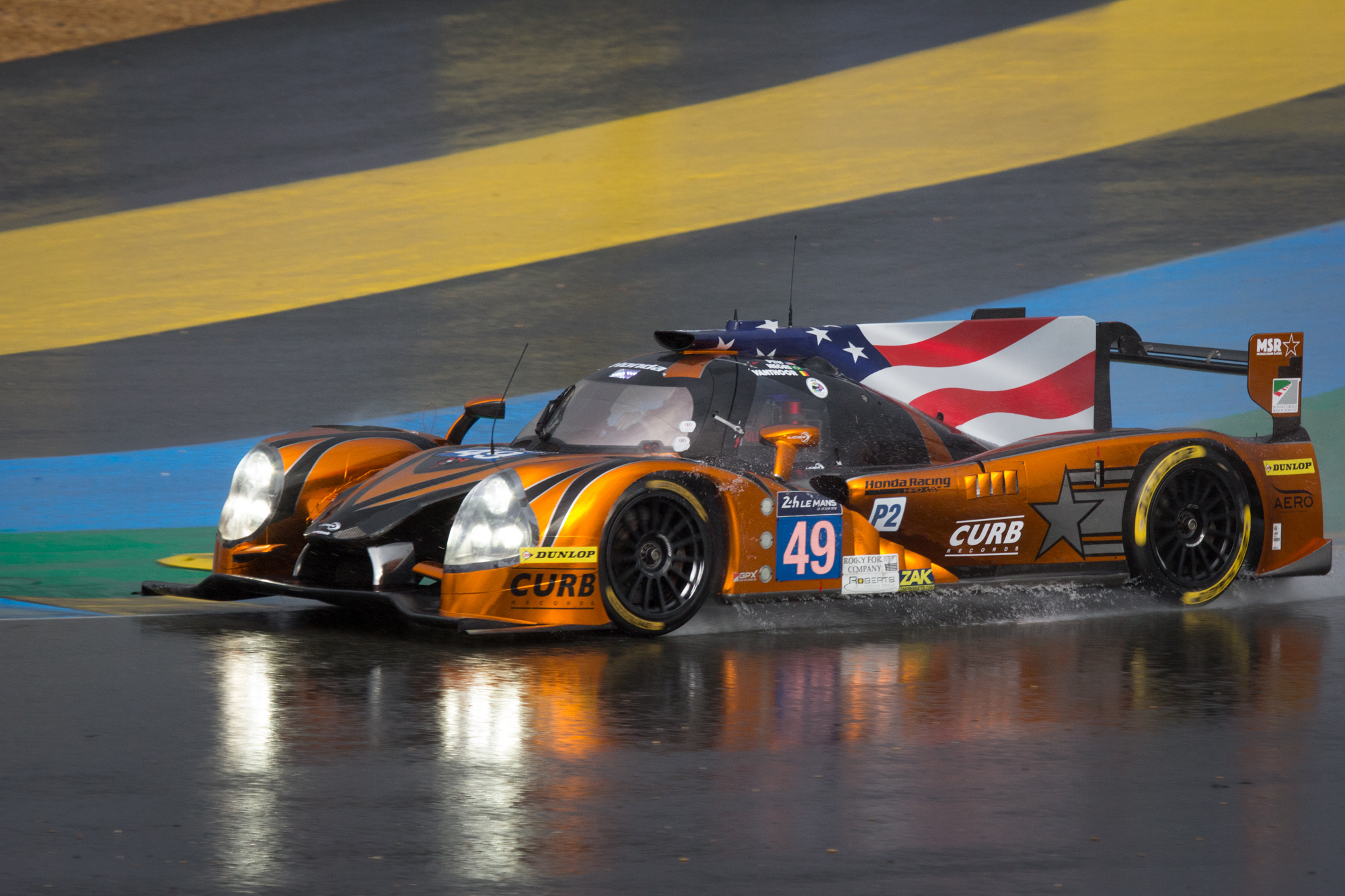
Ligier JS P2

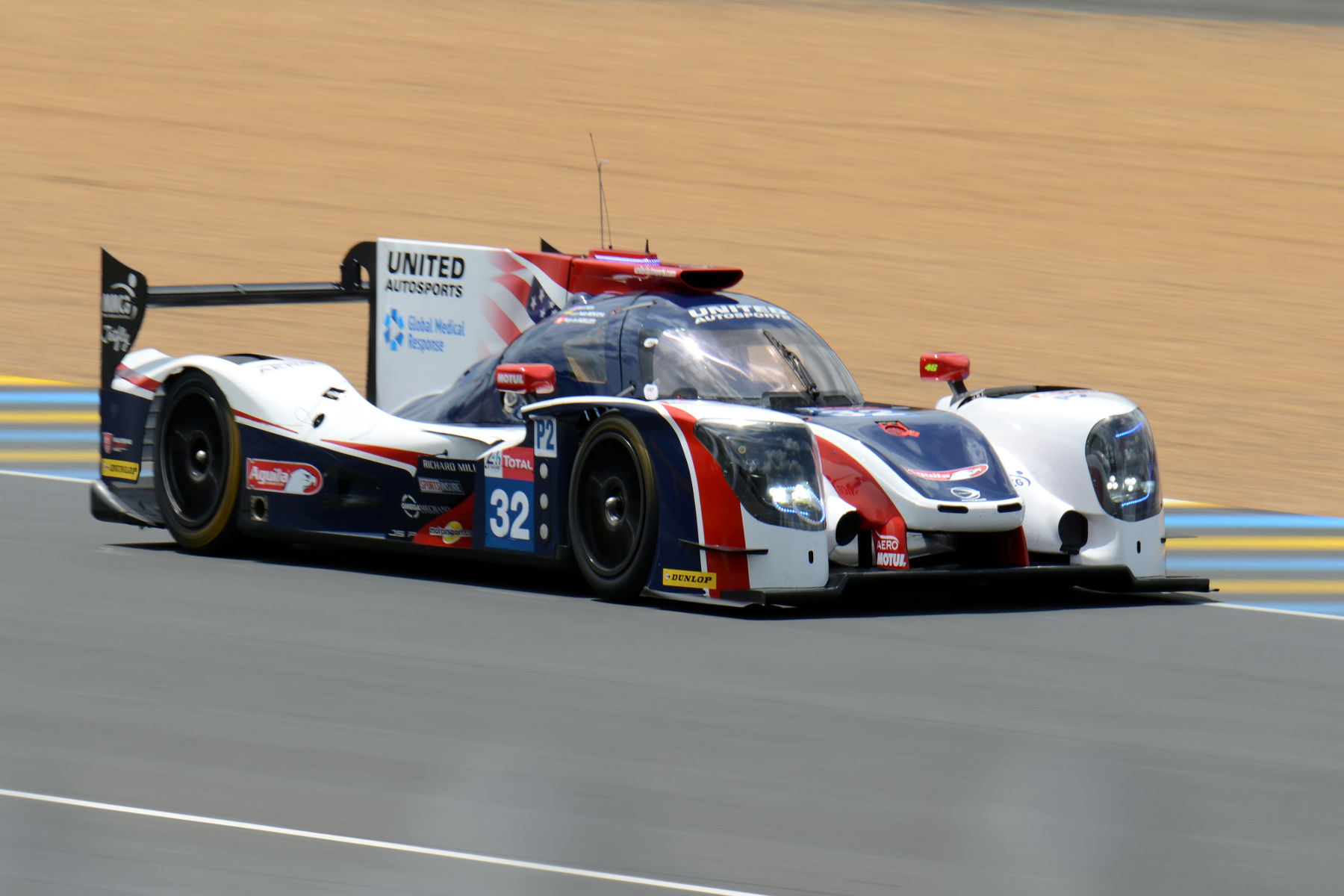
Ligier JS P217
