= Subaru Industrial Power Products =

Japanese corporate brand name

Coordinates: 36.0353523°N 139.5618333°E

- Type: Privately held
- Industry: Manufacturing
- Headquarters: 4 Chome-4-410 Asahi, Kitamoto, Saitama, Japan
- Area served: Worldwide
- Products: Engines, Portable generators, & de-watering pumps
- Parent: Subaru Corporation
- Website: Official website

Subaru Industrial Power Products was the brand name for products manufactured by the Industrial Products division of Subaru Corporation, which were previously sold under the Robin, Robin-Subaru and Wisconsin Robin brand. The line was sold under the Subaru brand, used by Subaru's automobiles for greater brand recognition. Subaru decided to close down the Industrial business to focus on the car business, selling Subaru power to Yamaha.

The company manufactured small engines, portable generators and de-watering construction pumps in Japan, China and at one time in Hudson, WI. The company's United States headquarters was located in Lake Zurich, Illinois. Subaru industrial engines, sold worldwide, were manufactured by partners in North America and Japan. Subaru's annual engine production exceeds 700,000 eighth largest engine manufacturer in the world.

== About the company and SBR ==
Subaru Industrial Power Products have been sold worldwide for more than 40 years. The engines were previously marketed under the Wisconsin Robin brand in North America under an agreement with Teledyne Total Power in 1969.

SBR is the parent company of Subaru Robin Industrial Engines. FHI includes four main divisions: Automobile, Aerospace, Eco Technologies and Industrial Products.

As of December 13, 2016, Subaru Industrial Power Products was acquired by Yamaha Motor Corp., USA.

On October 2, 2017, Subaru Corporation withdrew from the small engine power product business and ceased the production and sale of multi-purpose engines, generators and pumps.

== Technology innovations ==
Subaru was the first to offer chain-driven overhead cam (OHC) technology in the small, air-cooled engine market with its Subaru Industrial EX engine series. A standard for high-performance automotive engines, chain-driven OHC technology allows the intake and exhaust valves to be positioned for optimum engine performance. This offers lower resistance for the air/fuel mixture flow. With fewer moving parts, OHC engines produce less mechanical noise than competitive technologies and offer better cooling performance to combat overheating.

It's also believed that Subaru is the first company to utilize electronic fuel injection (EFI) technology in a mass-produced, single-cylinder recoil-start industrial engine.

== Engine lines ==
- Subaru Industrial SX engine
- Subaru Industrial SP engine
- Subaru Industrial Micro engine
- Subaru Industrial EX engine
- Subaru Industrial Rammer engine
- Subaru Industrial OHV Slant Cylinder engine
- Subaru Industrial OHV Vertical Cylinder engine
- Subaru Industrial V-Twin engine

== Generator lines ==
- Subaru Inverter generator
- Subaru Industrial generator
- Subaru Diesel generator

== Pump lines ==
- Subaru Centrifugal pump
- Subaru High-Pressure pump
- Subaru Semi-Trash pump
- Subaru Trash pump
- Subaru Diaphragm pump
- Subaru Submersible pump
